= Javier Sansó =

Spain skipper and navigator

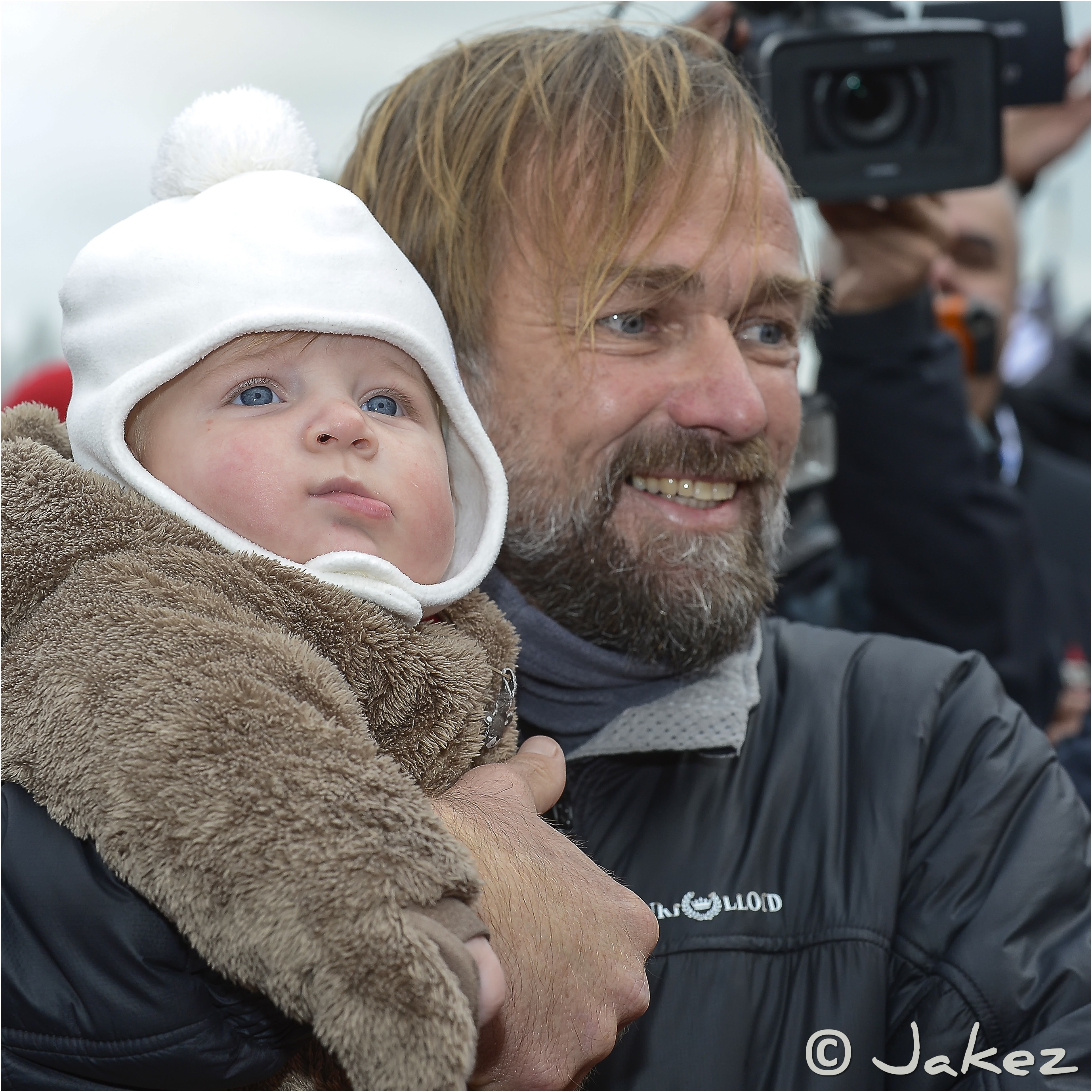

Personal information
- Nickname: "Bubi"
- Nationality: Spanish
- Born: 2 April 1969 (age 56) Palma de Mallorca

Sport

Sailing career
- Class: IMOCA 60

Javier Sanso (born 2 April 1969 in Palma de Mallorca) is a Spanish professional navigator and skipper.

== Vendee Globe ==
He has tried to complete the Vendee Globe yacht race twice, firstly in the fourth edition in the 2000–2001 Vendée Globe on Old Spice when he had to retire after 42 days at sea because of the breakage. He then took part in the 2012–2013 Vendée Globe but capsized (keel break) on 3 February 2013, 360 miles south of Sao Miguel in the Azores during his ascent of the Atlantic. He was rescued twelve hours later by the Portuguese Maritime Rescue Service.

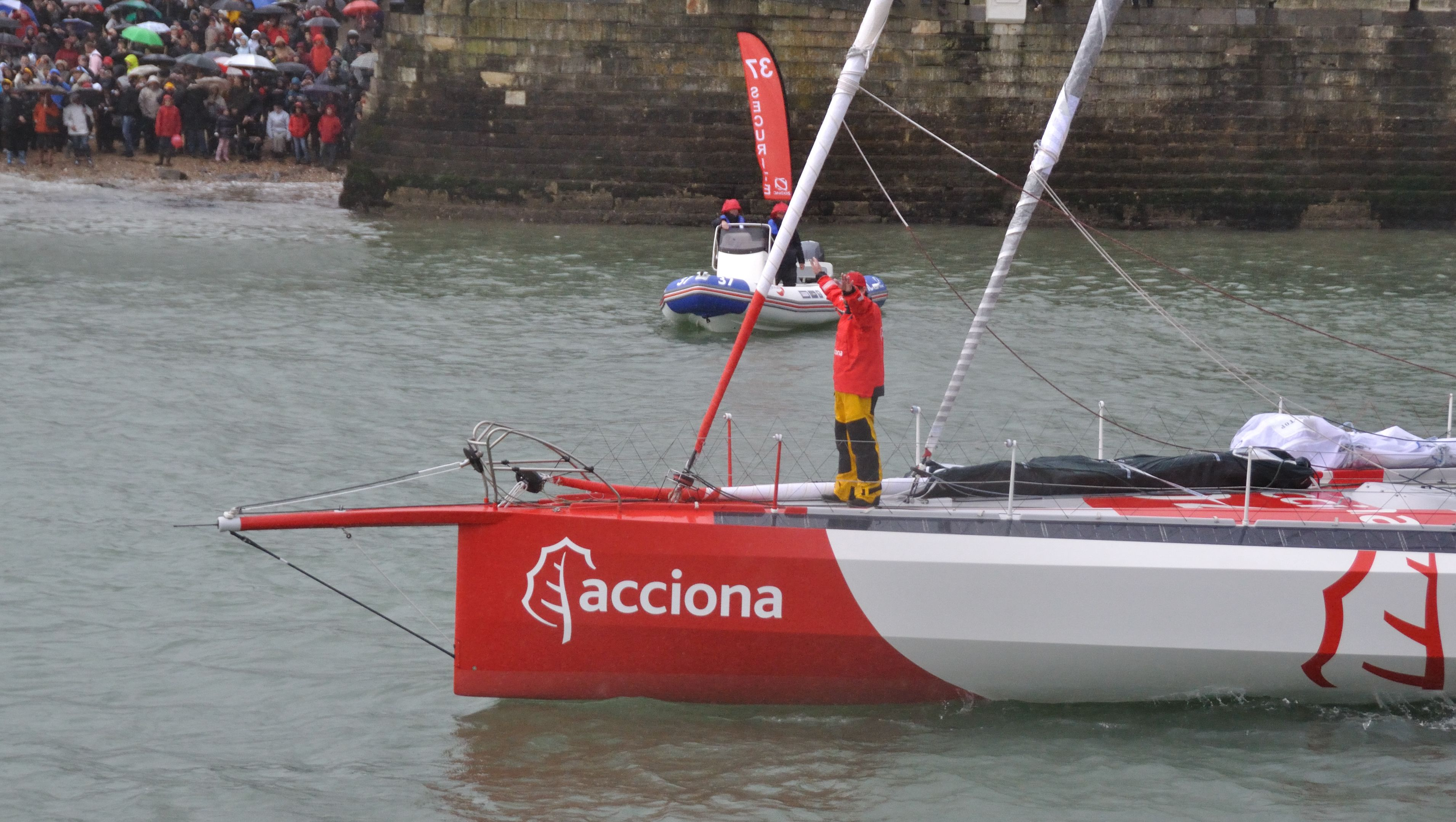

== Race Result Highlights ==
Pos	Year	Event name	Class	Boat name	Notes	Ref
Round the World Races
DNF	2012	2012–2013 Vendée Globe	IMOCA 60	Acciona 100% Ecopowered		
4th	2007	2007 Barcelona World Race	IMOCA 60	Mutua Madrilea	with Pachi Rivero	
DNF	2000	2000–2001 Vendée Globe	IMOCA 60	Old Spice		
Other Races
3rd	2009	2009 Transat Jacques Vabre	IMOCA 60	Gamesa	with Mike Golding	
1st	2009	2009 Hublot PalmaVela Regatta	Class C - Maxi	Lizard of Cornwall		
5th	2007	2007 Fastnet Race	IMOCA 60	Mutua Madrilea	with Pachi Rivero	
DNF	2003	2003 Transat Jacques Vabre		Objective 3	with Charles Hedrich	
4th	2001	2001 EDS Atlantic Challenge		IMOCA 60 Gartmore	on fully crewed on Josh Halls	
4th	2001	2001 Transat Jacques Vabre		SME-Negoceane	with Éric Dumont	
