= IMOCA 60 Hugo Boss 2 =

Sailboat

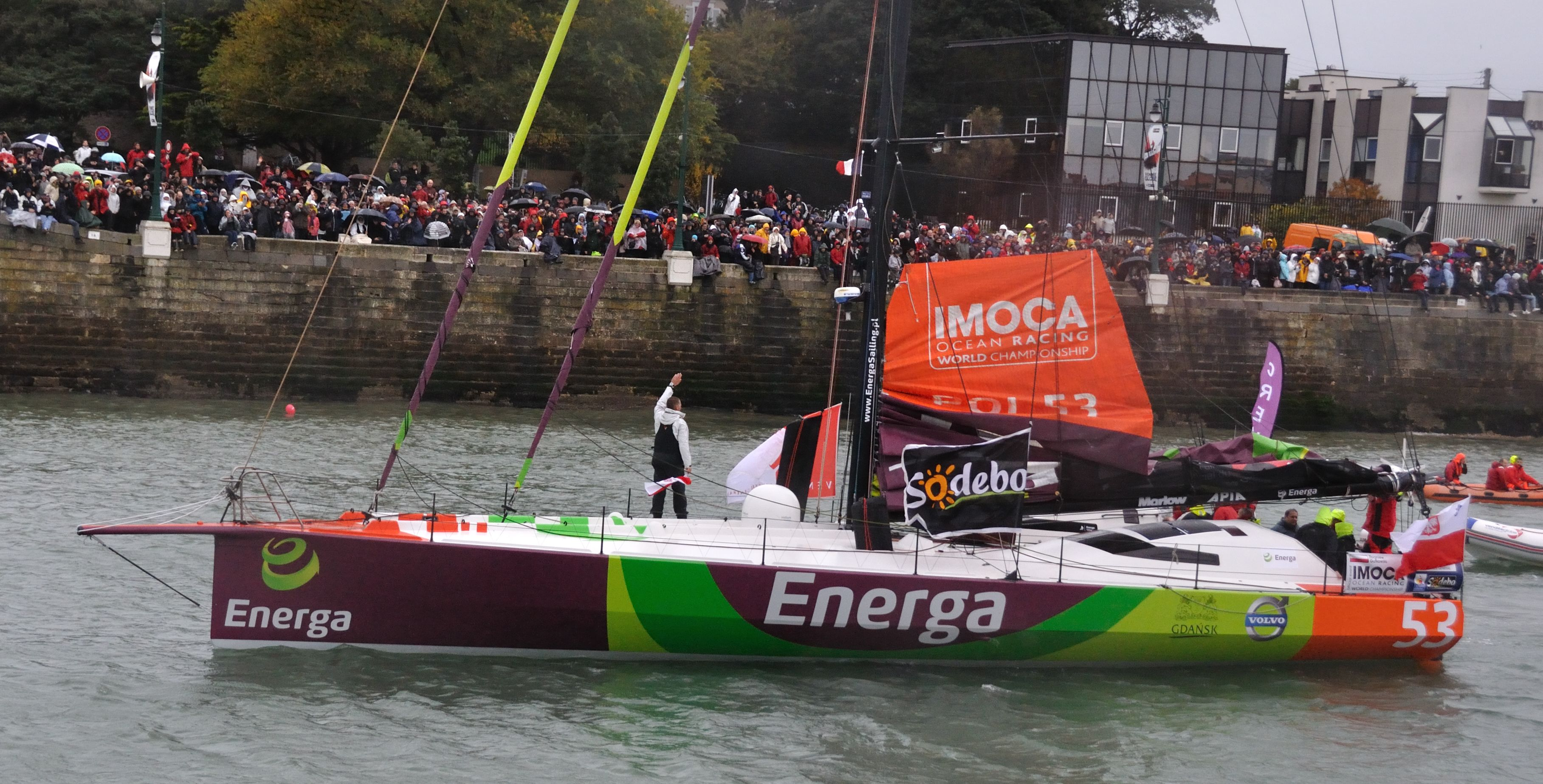

Development
- Designer: Finot-Conq
- Builders: Neville Hutton Boat Builder, Carrington Boats Ltd

Hull appendages
- Ballast: Canting Keel
- Rudder: Twin Rudders

Racing
- Class association: IMOCA 60

The IMOCA 60 class yacht Hugo Boss 2 was designed by Group Finot and launched in the 2007 after being built by Jason Carrington/Neville Hutton in Lymington, England.

== Names and ownership ==
Hugo Boss 2 (2007-2009)

- Skipper: Alex Thomson

Energa (2012-2013)

- Skipper: Zbigniew Gutkowski

La Compagnie du Lit – Boulogne Billancourt (2016-2017)

- Skipper: Stéphane Le Diraison

Time For Oceans (2018-2021)

- Skipper: Stéphane Le Diraison

Gentoo Sailing Team (since 2022)

- Skipper: James Harayda
- Sail No.: GBR 88

== Racing results ==
| Pos | Year | Race | Class | Boat name | Skipper | Notes | Ref |
Round the world races
| 18 / 33 | 2020 | 2020–2021 Vendée Globe | IMOCA 60 | Time For Oceans, FRA 92 | Stéphane Le Diraison (FRA) | 95d 08h 16m | |
| DNF | 2016 | 2016–2017 Vendée Globe | IMOCA 60 | Compagnie du Lit – Boulogne Billancourt, FRA 92 | Stéphane Le Diraison (FRA) | | |
| DNF | 2012 | 2012–2013 Vendée Globe | IMOCA 60 | Energa, POL 53 | Zbigniew Gutkowski (POL) | | |
| DNF | 2008 | 2008–2009 Vendée Globe | IMOCA 60 | Hugo Boss 2 | Alex Thomson (GBR) | | |
| 2 / 9 | 2007 | Barcelona World Race | IMOCA 60 | Hugo Boss 2 | Alex Thomson (GBR); Andrew Cape (AUS) | 94d 17h 34m | |
Transatlantic Races
| 14 / 38 | 2022 | Route du Rhum | IMOCA 60 | Gentoo Sailing Team, GBR 88 | James Harayda (GBR) | 13d 12h 13m | |
| 15 / 22 | 2021 | Transat Jacques Vabre | IMOCA 60 | Time For Oceans, FRA 92 | Stéphane Le Diraison (FRA); Didac Costa (FRA) | | |
| 20 / 29 | 2019 | Transat Jacques Vabre | IMOCA 60 | Time For Oceans, FRA 92 | Stéphane Le Diraison (FRA); François Guiffant (FRA) | | |
| 8 / 20 | 2018 | Route du Rhum | IMOCA 60 | Time For Oceans, FRA 92 | Stéphane Le Diraison (FRA) | 15d 02h 30m | |
| 7 / 10 | 2013 | Transat Jacques Vabre | IMOCA 60 | Energa, POL 53 | Zbigniew Gutkowski (POL); Maciej Marczewski (POL) | 20d 10h 47m | |
| DNF | 2011 | Transat Jacques Vabre | IMOCA 60 | Hugo Boss 2 | Alex Thomson (GBR); Ross Daniel (GBR) | | |
Other Races
