= IMOCA 60 Sill =

Round the World Racing Yacht

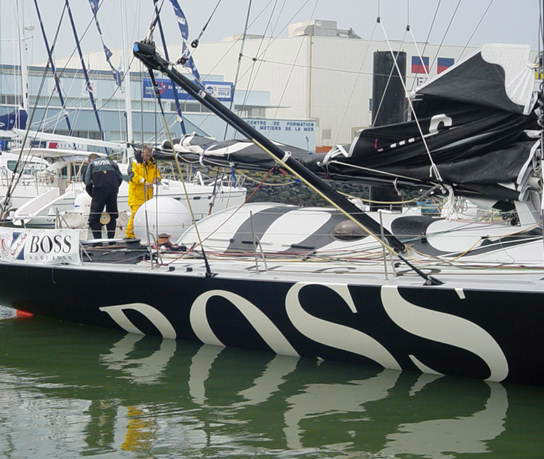

Development
- Designer: Marc Lombard, Marc Lombard Yacht Design Group
- Builder: Mag France

The IMOCA 60 class yacht SILL PLEIN FRUIT, FRA 29 was designed by Marc Lombard and launched in the 1999 after being built MAG based in France. The boat was lost in 2006 Velux 5 Ocean Race, when he was rescued by fellow competitor Mike Golding deep in the Southern Ocean. The written off hull was found nine years later washed up, 10,000 miles from where it was abandoned.

== Racing results ==
Pos	Year	Race	Class	Boat name	Skipper	Notes	Ref
Round the world races
DNF	2007	Velux 5 Oceans Race	IMOCA 60	GBR 99 - Hugo Boss (1)	Alex Thomson (GBR)		
DNF	2004	2004–2005 Vendée Globe	IMOCA 60	GBR 88 - Hugo Boss (1)	Alex Thomson (GBR)		
3 / 24	2012	2000–2001 Vendée Globe	IMOCA 60	SILL - MATINES - LA POTAGERE	Roland Jourdain (FRA)	96d 01h	
Transatlantic Races
Other Races
