= 2012–2013 Vendée Globe =

Event title
- Name: 2012–2013 Vendée Globe
- Edition: 7th edition
- Sponsor: Vendee Region of France

Event details
- Start location: Les Sables-d'Olonne
- Finish location: Les Sables-d'Olonne
- Course: Solo non-stop round the world race
- Start date: 10 November 2012
- Finish date: 10 November 2012
- Yachts: IMOCA 60

Competitors
- Competitors: 20

Results
- (gold) Gold: François Gabart (FRA); Macif
- (silver) Silver: Armel Le Cléac’h (FRA); Banque Populaire
- (bronze) Bronze: Alex Thomson (GBR); Hugo Boss 4

The 2012–2013 Vendée Globe was a non-stop solo round-the-world yacht race for IMOCA 60 class yachts and the seventh edition of the race.

== Summary ==
The 2012 Vendée Globe started on 10 November 2012. The race saw the 24-hour singlehanded distance record repeatedly reset by several competitors. Armel Le Cléac’h (Banque Populaire) set a new race record for shortest time to the longitude of the Cape of Good Hope, and François Gabart (Macif) set new race records for shortest time to the longitude of Cape Leeuwin in Australia and to Cape Horn. On 27 January 2013, Gabart set a new Vendée Globe record with just over 78 days to complete the circumnavigation. The interval of 3h 17’ between the arrivals of the first and second contenders is also the shortest in the race's history.

Race Director for this edition was Denis Horeau who heads the event management team having done the role for the 1989, 2004 and 2008 editions.

== Incidents ==
=== Other incidents ===
Jean Piere Dick finished the Vendee Globe without the keel attached as a remarkable piece of seamanship meant he sailed the final 2650 nautical miles. With Alex Thomson altering course to escort him during worsening conditions.

== Results ==
=== Finishing time ===
Table: Order of Finish, 2012–2013 Vendée Globe
Pos	Sailor	Yacht	Time	Notes	Ref
1	François Gabart (FRA)	Macif	78d 02h 16m 40s	New Record Time	
2	Armel Le Cléac'h (FRA)	Banque Populaire	78d 05h 33m 52s		
3	Alex Thomson (GBR)	Hugo Boss 4	80d 19h 23m 43s		
4	Jean-Pierre Dick (FRA)	Virbac-Paprec 3	86d 03h 03m 40s	Sailed 2,643 miles without a keel	
5	Jean Le Cam (FRA)	SynerCiel	88d 00h 12m 58s		
6	Mike Golding (GBR)	Gamesa	88d 06h 36m 26s		
7	Dominique Wavre (SUI)	Mirabaud	90d 03h 14m 42s		
8	Arnaud Boissières (FRA)	Akena Vérandas (3)	91d 02h 09m 02s		
9	Bertrand de Broc (FRA)	Votre Nom autour du Monde avec EDM Projets	Elapsed 92d 05h 10m 14s Corrected 92d 17h 10' 14"	(1)	
10	Tanguy de Lamotte (FRA)	Initiatives-Cœur (1)	98d 21h 56' 10"		
11	Alessandro Di Benedetto (ITA) (FRA)	Team Plastique	104d 02h 34' 30"		
DNF	Javier Sansó (ESP)	Acciona 100% EcoPowered	Day 84: capsized (the boat is later recovered and towed to the azores)		
DSQ	Bernard Stamm (SUI)	Cheminées Poujoulat (5)	Day 51: disqualified after receiving assistance, however he completed the course in 88d 10h 27' 50"		
DNF	Vincent Riou (FRA)	PRB 4	Day 14: broken outrigger stay resulting from collision		
DNF	Zbigniew Gutkowski (POL)	Energa	Day 11: electrical issues resulting in autopilot not being able to work		
DNF	Jérémie Beyou (FRA)	Maître CoQ	Day 9: Broken Keel Ram		
DNF	Samantha Davies (GBR)	Savéol	Day 5: Dismasted (retired unaided under Jury Rig)		
DNF	Louis Burton (FRA)	Bureau Vallée (1)	Day 3: collision with a fishing boat		
DNF	Kito de Pavant (FRA)	Groupe Bel	Day 2: collision with a fishing boat (Retired unaided to Cascais)		
DNF	Marc Guillemot (FRA)	Safran 2	Day 1: Damaged keel head (Retired unaided to La Trinte)		

(1) 12h time penalty for unsealing and using emergency water supply

=== Stage times ===
officiel du Vendée Globe:
Skipper	Boat name	Equator	Cape of Good Hope	Leeuwin	Cape Horn	Equator	Finish Line
François Gabart	Macif	11 d 00 h 20 min	23 d 03 h 43 min	34 d 10 h 23 min	52 d 06 h 18 min	66 d 01 h 39 min	78 d 02 h 16 min
Armel Le Cléac’h	Banque Populaire VI	10 d 19 h 18 min	22 d 23 h 46 min	34 d 12 h 13 min	52 d 07 h 33 min	66 d 16 h 45 min	78 d 05 h 33 min
Alex Thomson	Hugo Boss 4	11 d 02 h 34 min	23 d 12 h 33 min	35 d 22 h 13 min	54 d 14 h 36 min	68 d 14 h 53 min	80 d 19 h 23 min
Jean-Pierre Dick	Virbac-Paprec 3	11 d 00 h 25 min	23 d 03 h 03 min	35 d 16 h 28 min	53 d 16 h 40 min	67 d 22 h 00 min	86 d 03 h 03 min
Jean Le Cam	SynerCiel	11 d 20 h 08 min	24 d 12 h 48 min	38 d 16 h 13 min	58 d 19 h 17 min	75 d 06 h 58 min	88 d 00 h 12 min
Mike Golding	Gamesa	11 d 13 h 13 min	24 d 07 h 18 min	39 d 06 h 38 min	59 d 14 h 02 min	75 d 12 h 12 min	88 d 06 h 36 min
Dominique Wavre	Mirabaud	11 d 20 h 43 min	24 d 13 h 53 min	39 d 10 h 43 min	59 d 22 h 16 min	76 d 19 h 42 min	90 d 03 h 14 min
Arnaud Boissières	Akena Vérandas (3)	13 d 13 h 58 min	26 d 15 h 58 min	42 d 03 h 13 min	60 d 09 h 53 min	77 d 14 h 11 min	91 d 02 h 09 min
Bertrand de Broc	Votre Nom autour du Monde	14 d 02 h 23 min	28 d 08 h 58 min	43 d 18 h 28 min	65 d 05 h 58 min	79 d 02 h 58 min	92 d 17 h 10 min
Tanguy de Lamotte	Initiatives-Cœur (1)	13 d 15 h 53 min	30 d 00 h 14 min	44 d 17 h 58 min	65 d 17 h 01 min	81 d 10 h 07 min	98 d 21 h 56 min
Alessandro Di Benedetto	Team Plastique	15 d 20 h 03 min	32 d 05 h 28 min	47 d 02 h 13 min	68 d 05 h 29 min	86 d 10 h 37 min	104 d 02 h 34 min
Javier Sansó	Acciona	13 d 09 h 13 min	26 d 17 h 05 min	39 d 18 h 28 min	60 d 12 h 50 min	78 d 02 h 24 min	abandon
Bernard Stamm	Cheminées Poujoulat (5)	11 d 03 h 25 min	23 d 06 h 44 min	35 d 21 h 43 min	abandon		
Vincent Riou	PRB 4	11 d 00 h 10 min	abandon				

== Gallery ==
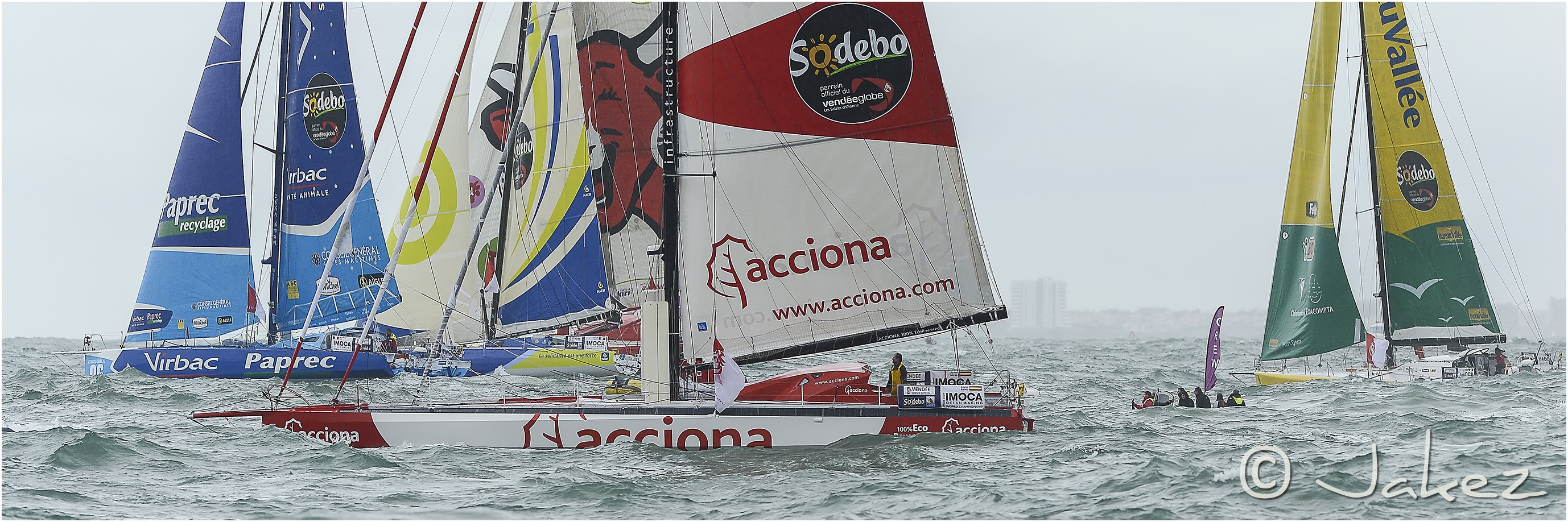
Acciona,

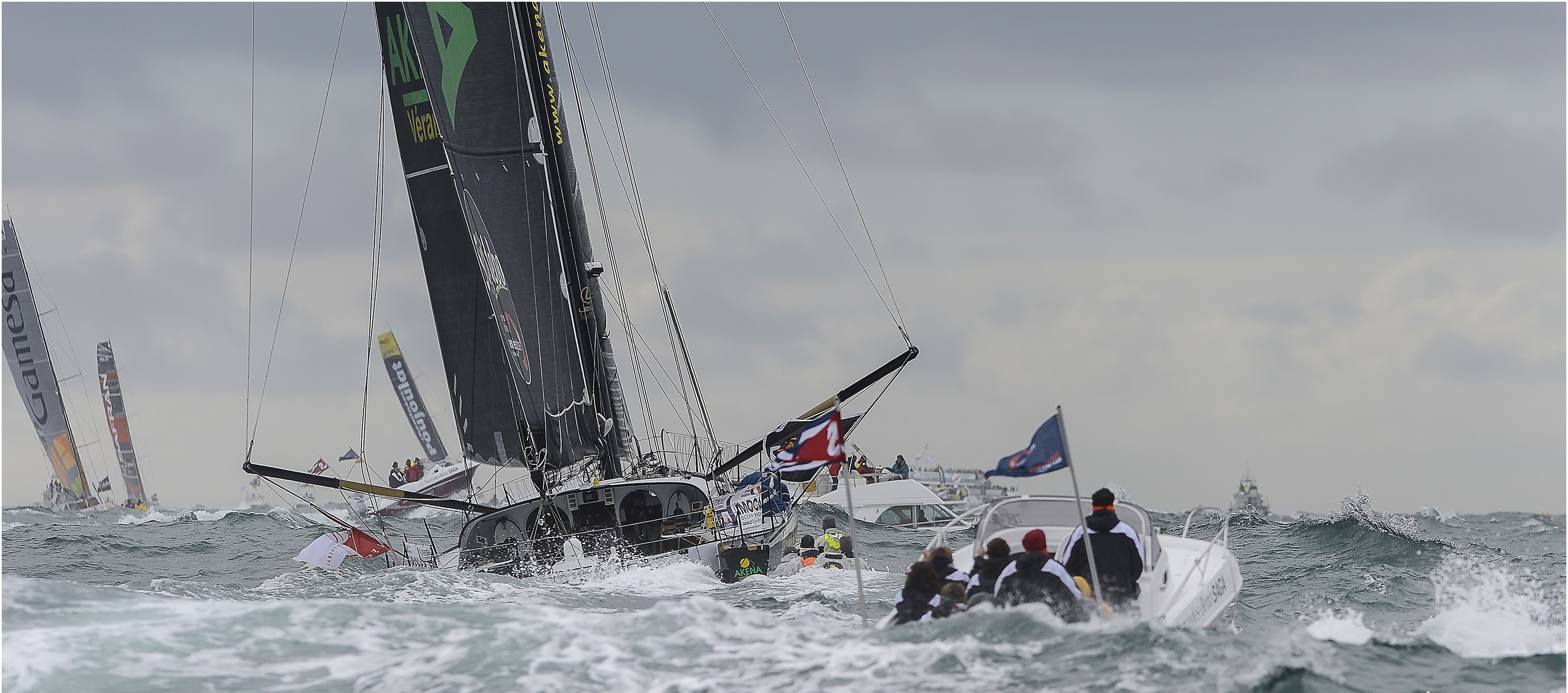
Akena Vérandas (3)

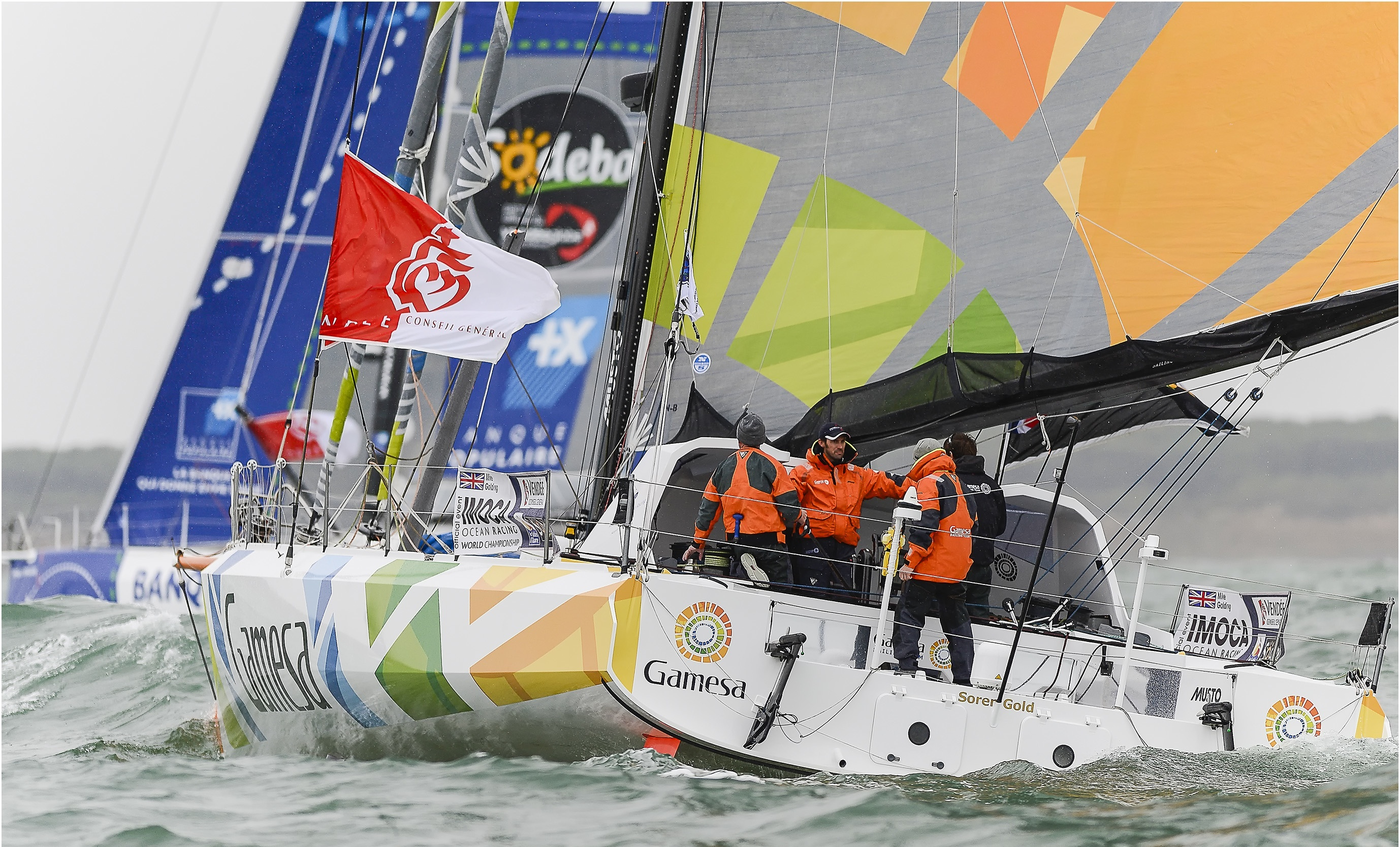
Gamesa, Mike Golding

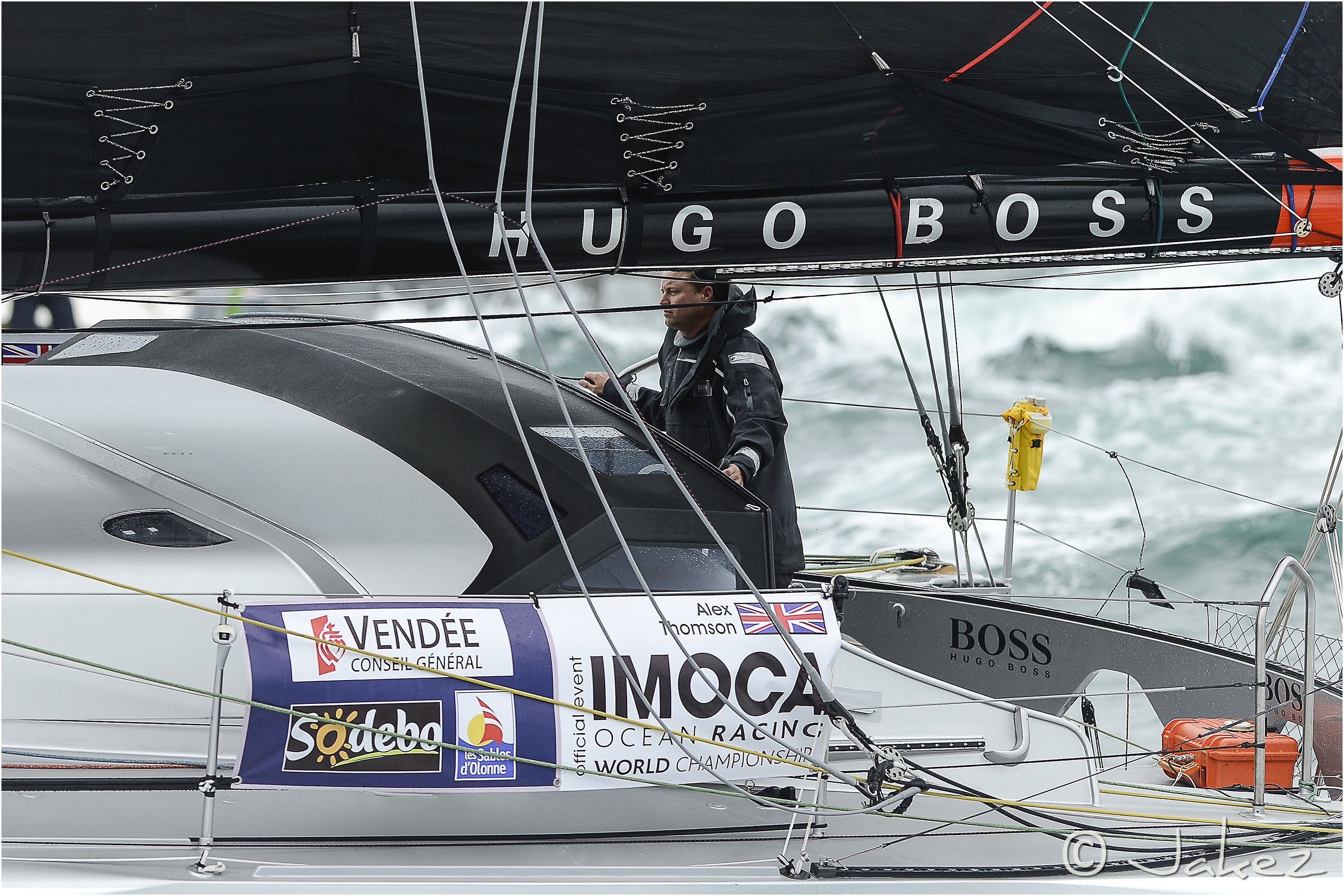
Hugo Boss 4, Alex Thomson

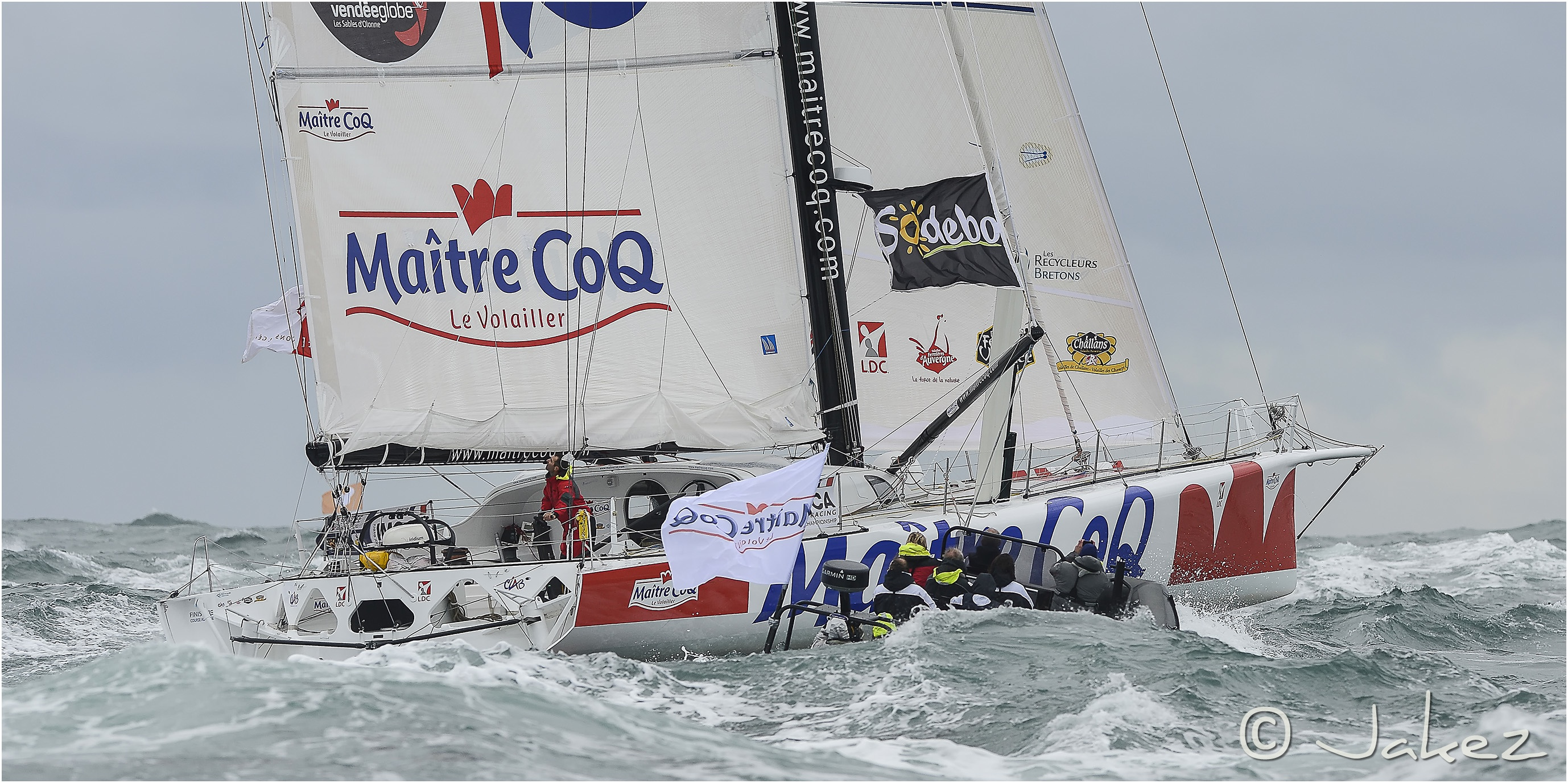
Maître Coq,

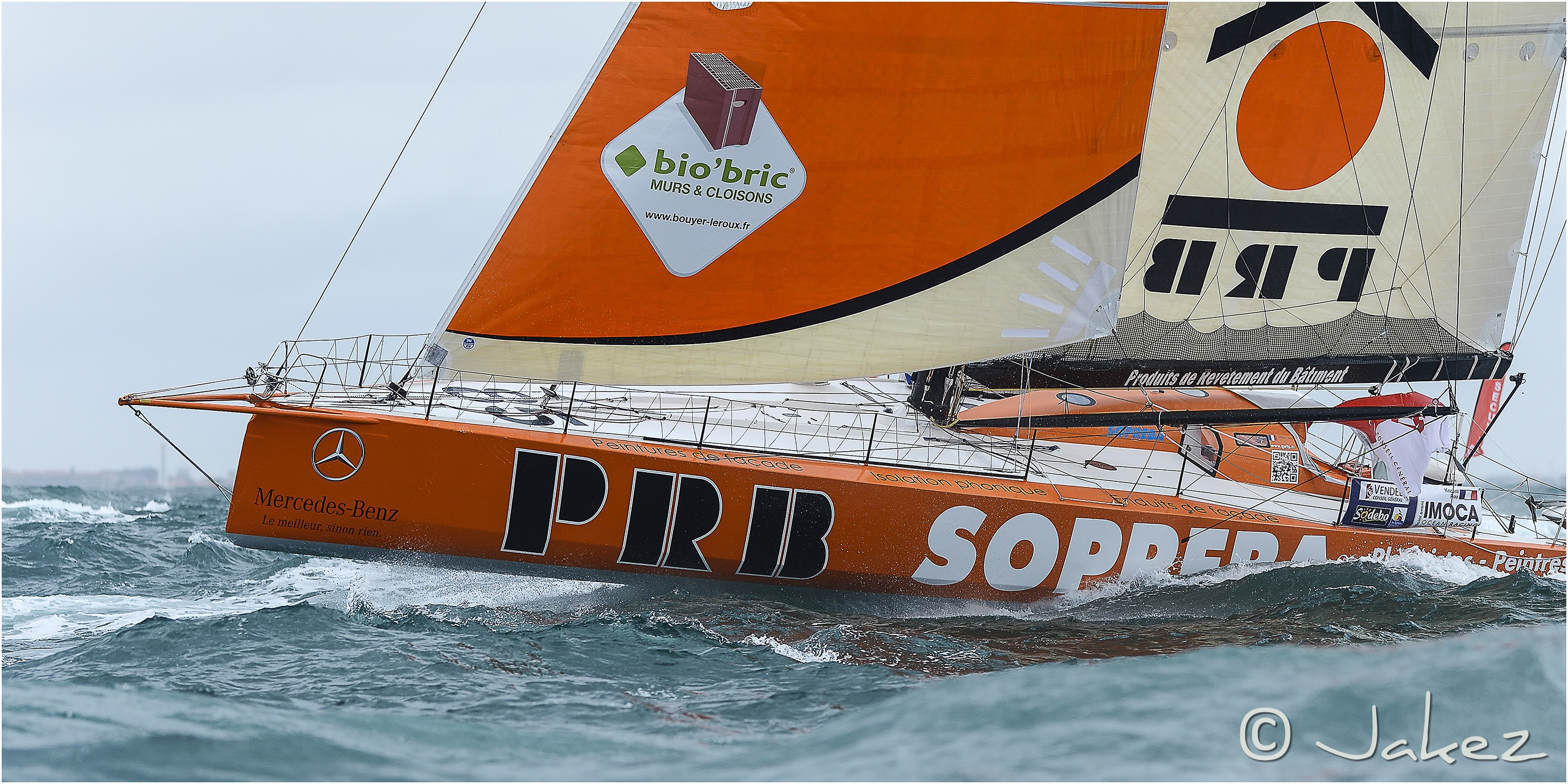
PRB 4,

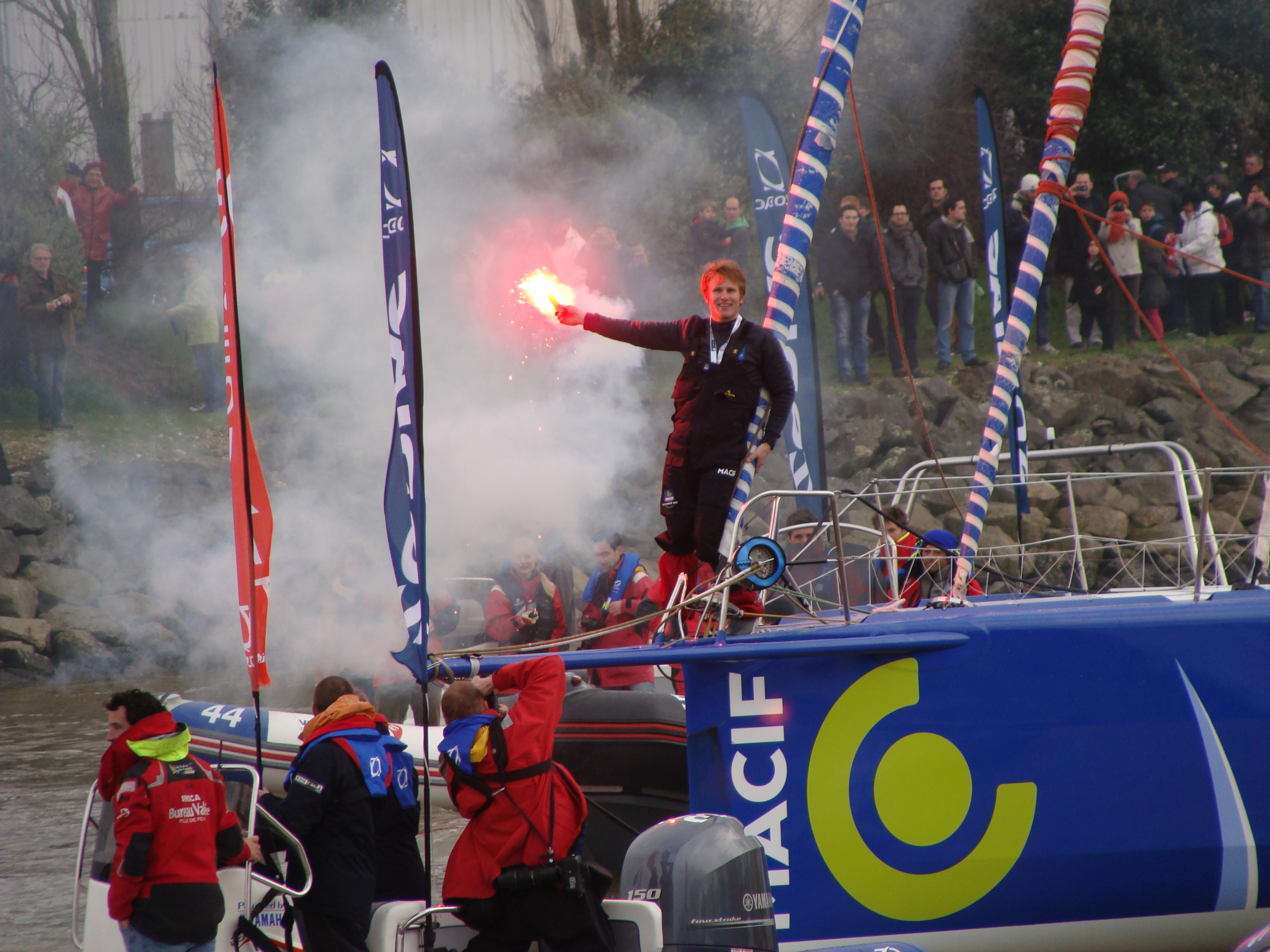
François Gabart (FRA)
Macif

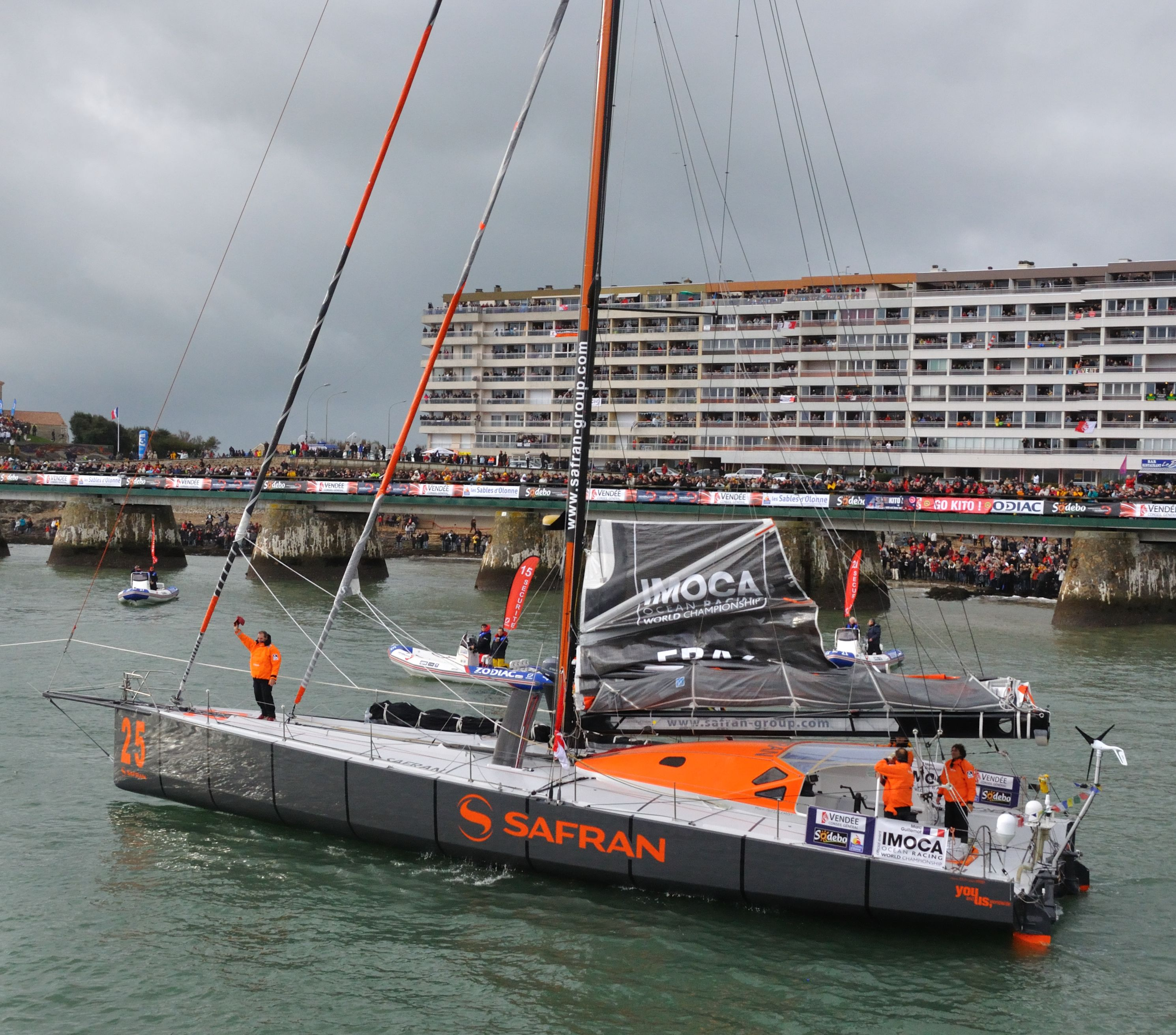
Safran 2, Marc Guillemot

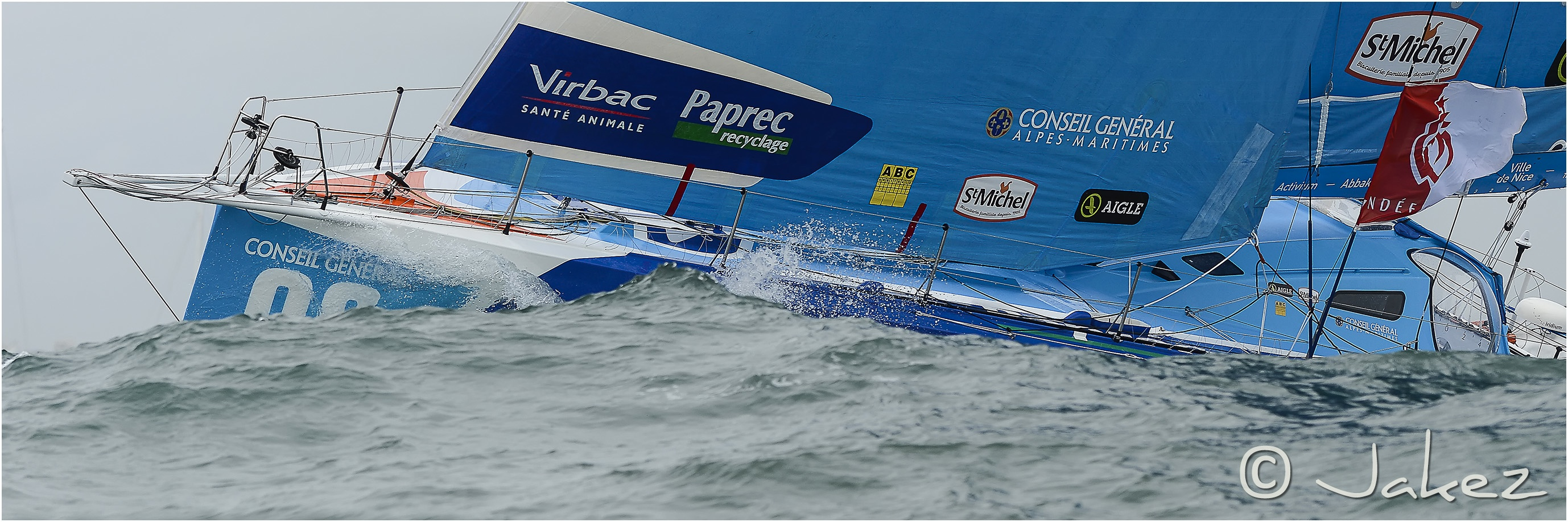
Virbac-Paprec 3

== Competitor ==
=== Gallery of sailors ===
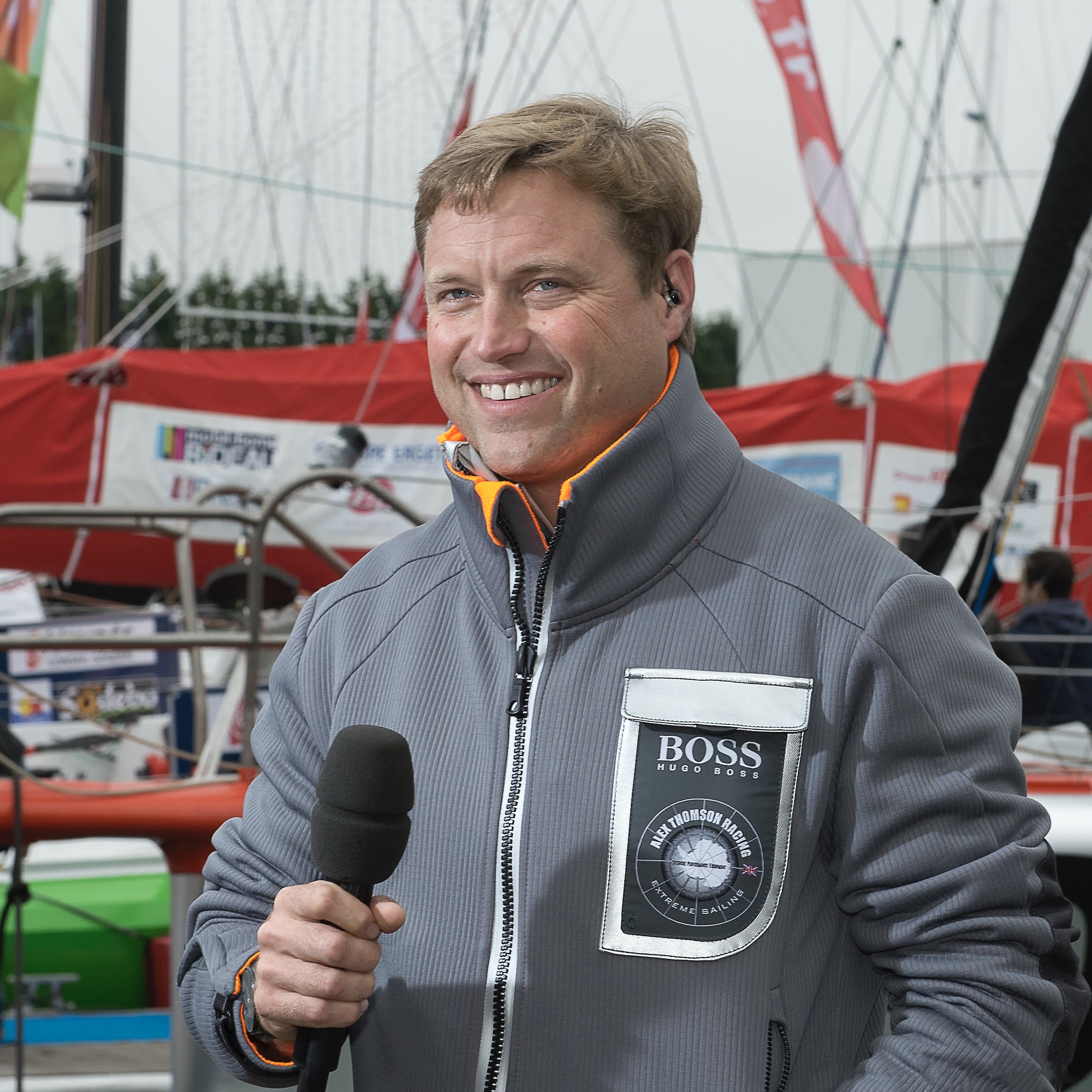
Alex Thomson (GBR)
Hugo Boss 4

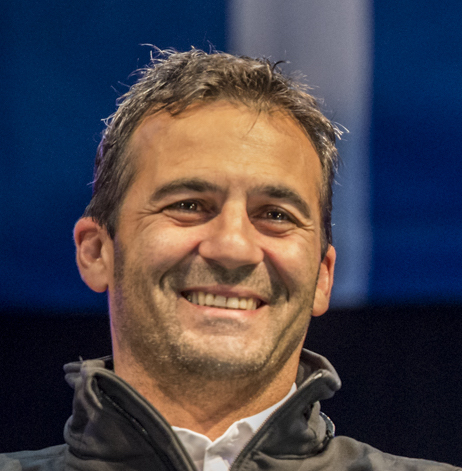
Alessandro Di Benedetto (ITA) (FRA)
Team Plastique

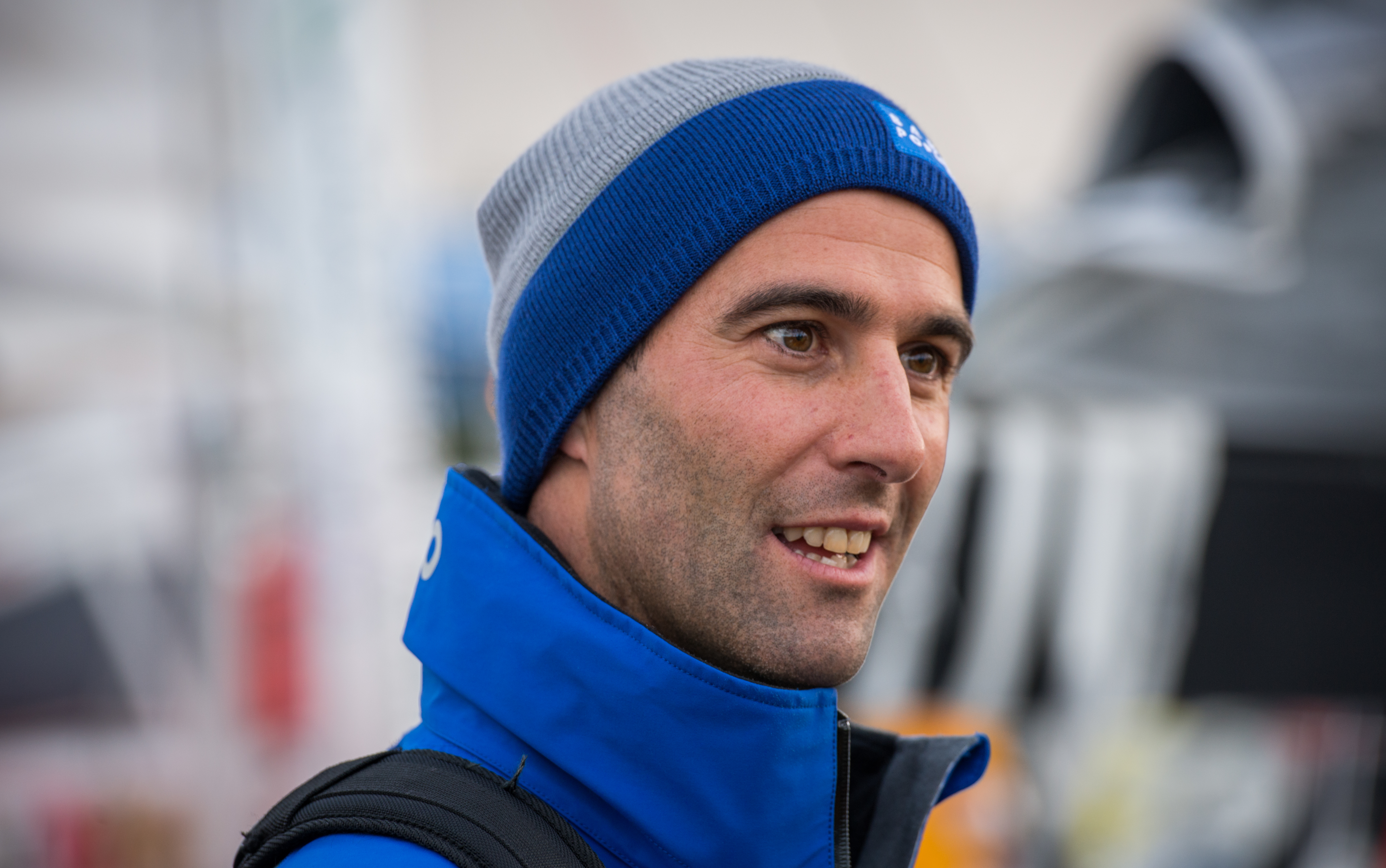
Armel Le Cléac’h (FRA)
Banque Populaire

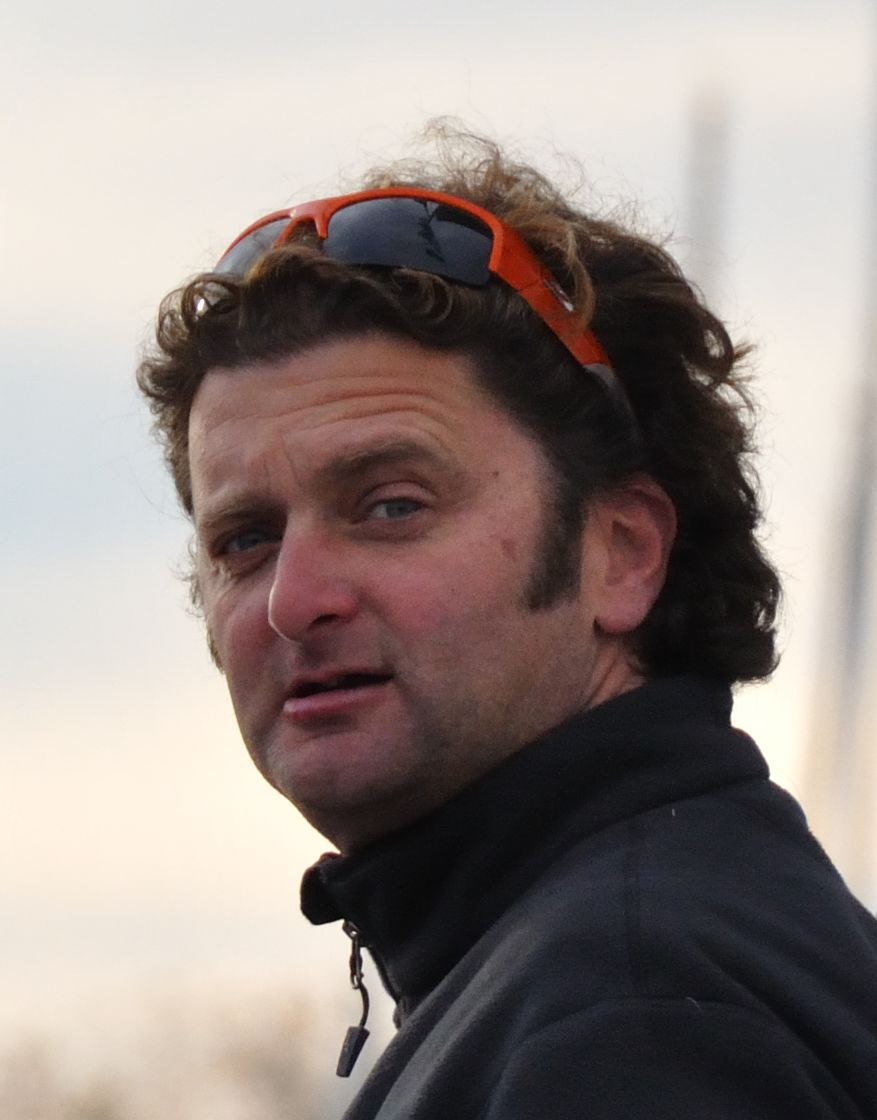
Arnaud Boissières (FRA)
Akena Vérandas (3)

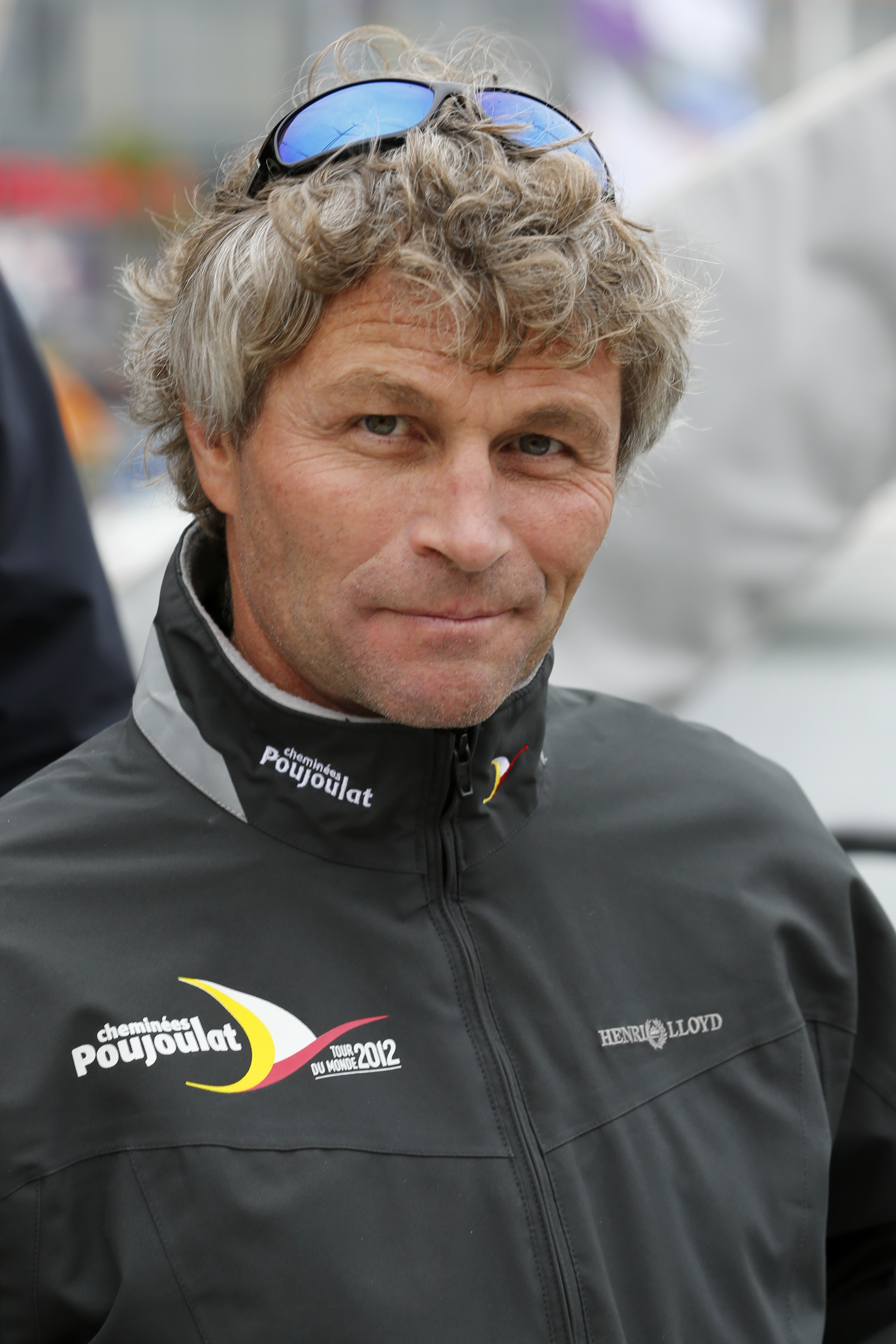
Bernard Stamm (SUI)
Cheminées Poujoulat (5)

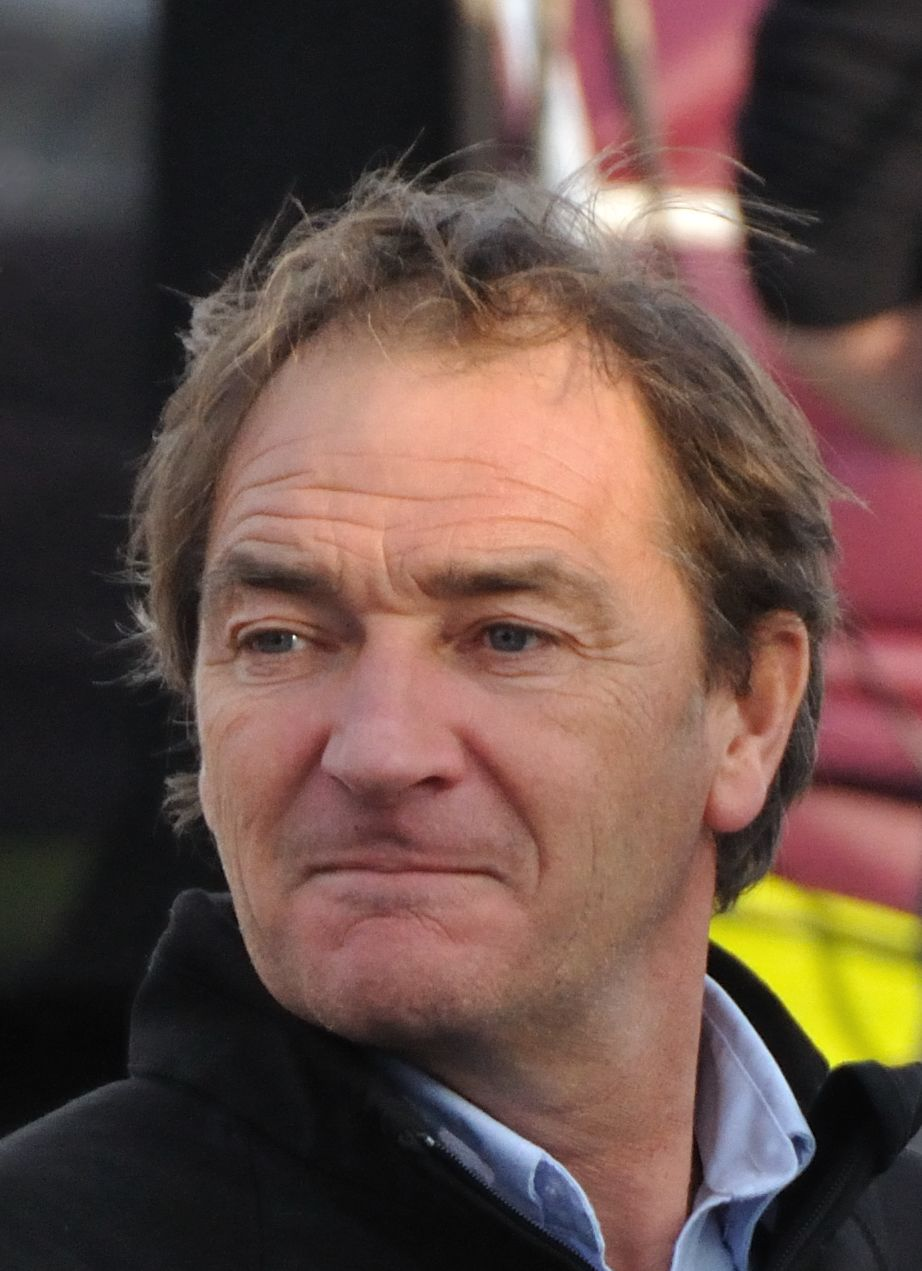
Bertrand De Broc (FRA)
Votre Nom autour du Monde avec EDM Projets

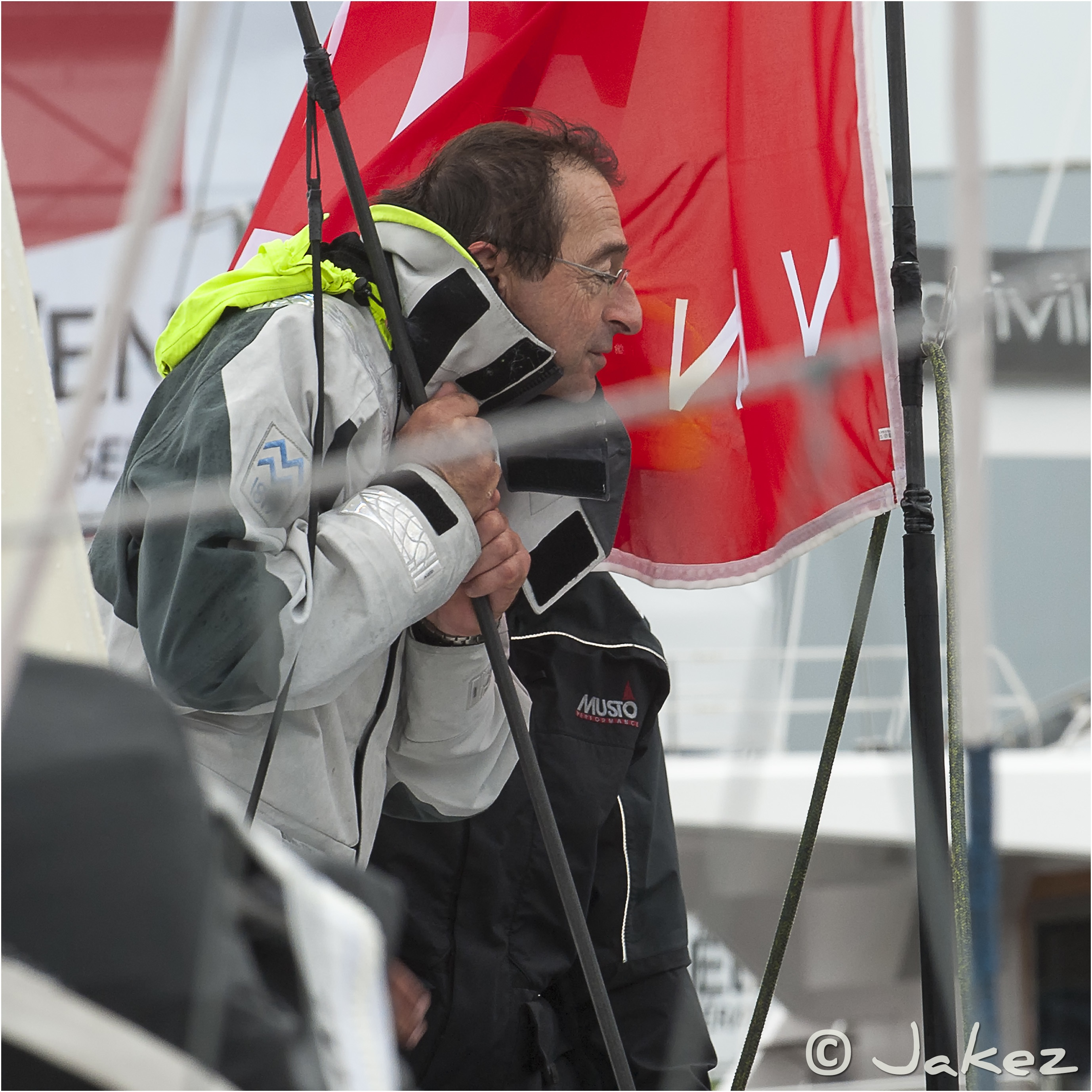
Dominique Wavre (SUI)
Mirabaud

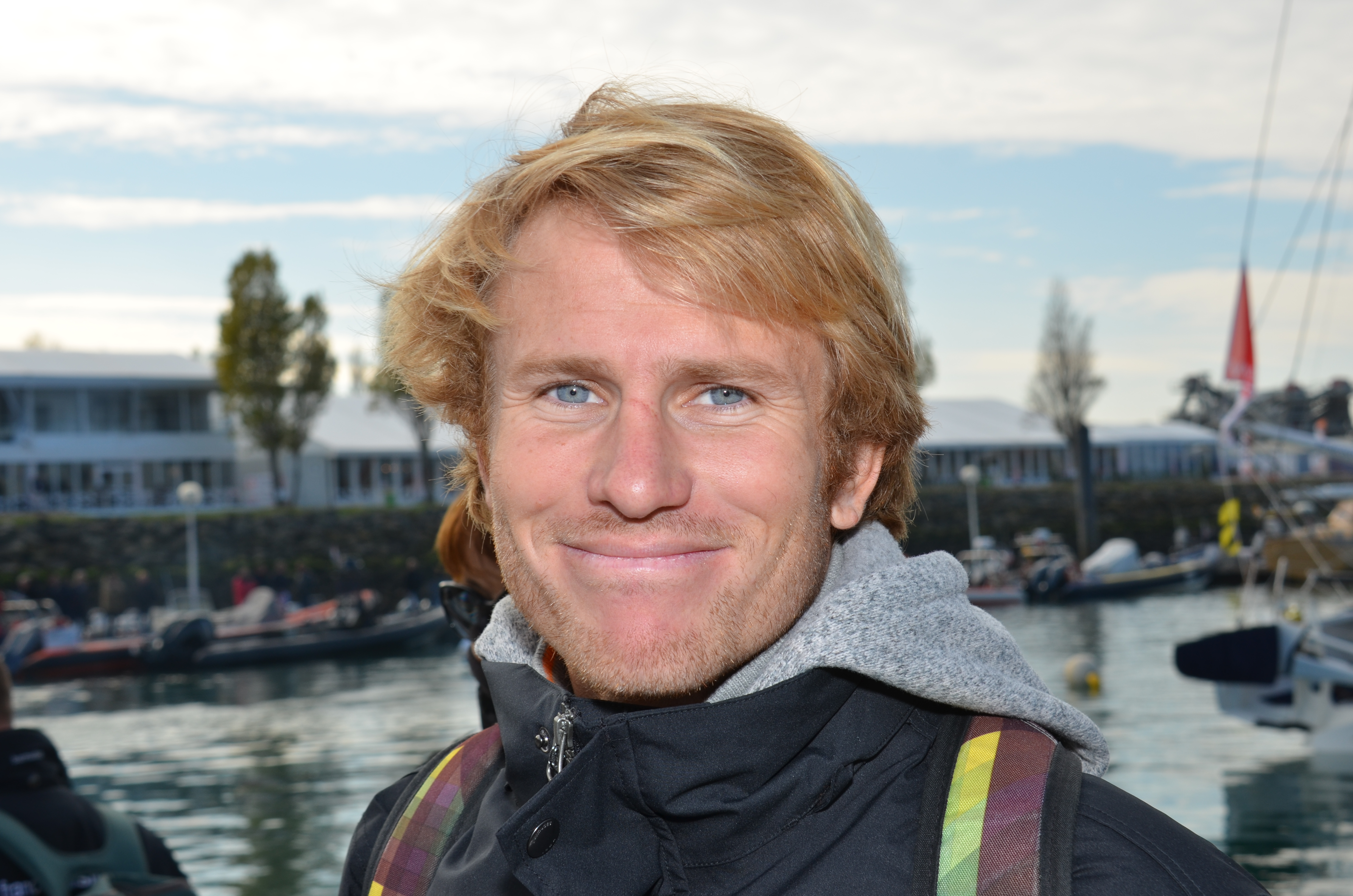
François Gabart (FRA)
Macif

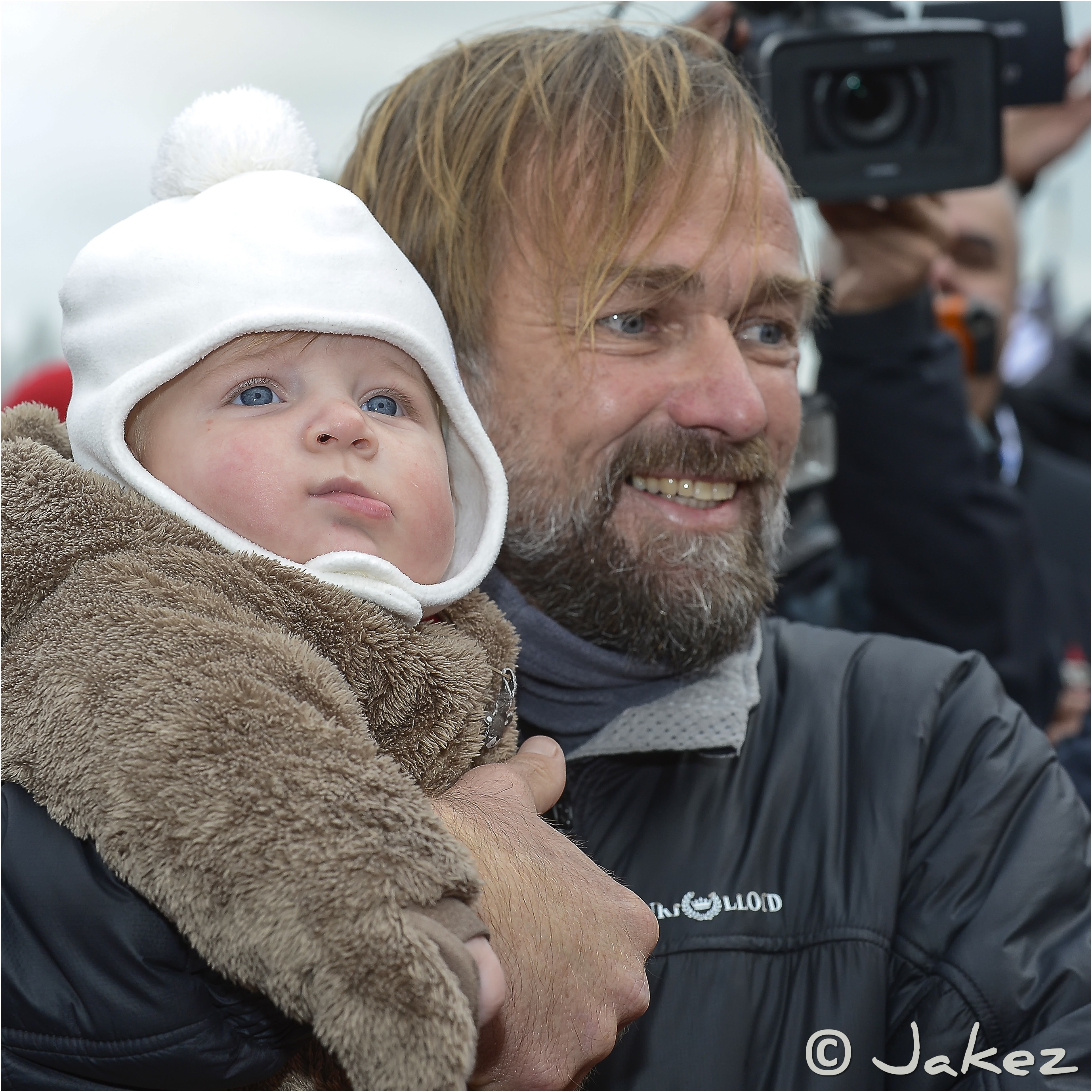
Javier Sanso (ESP)
Acciona 100% EcoPowered

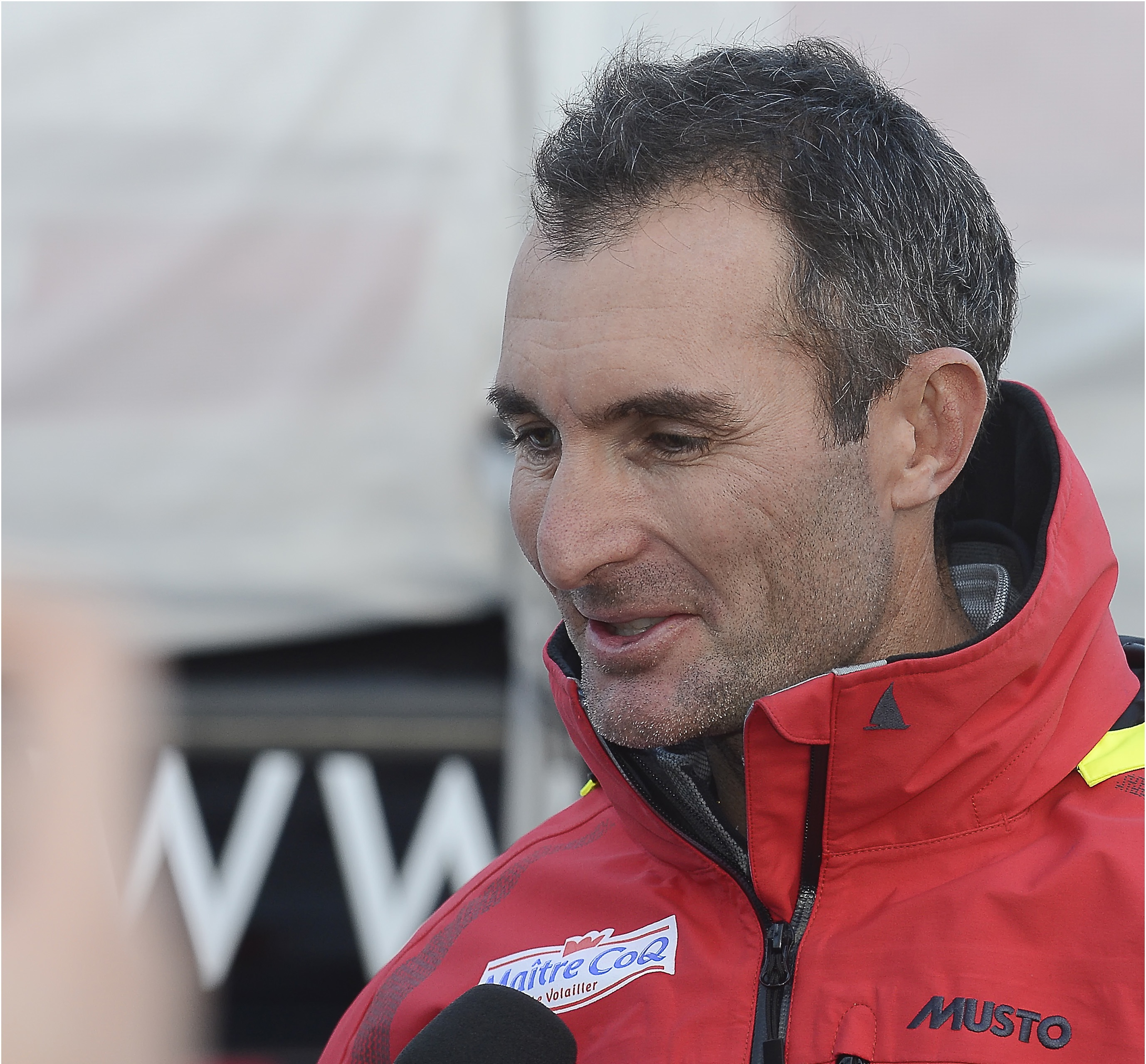
Jérémie Beyou (FRA)
Maître CoQ

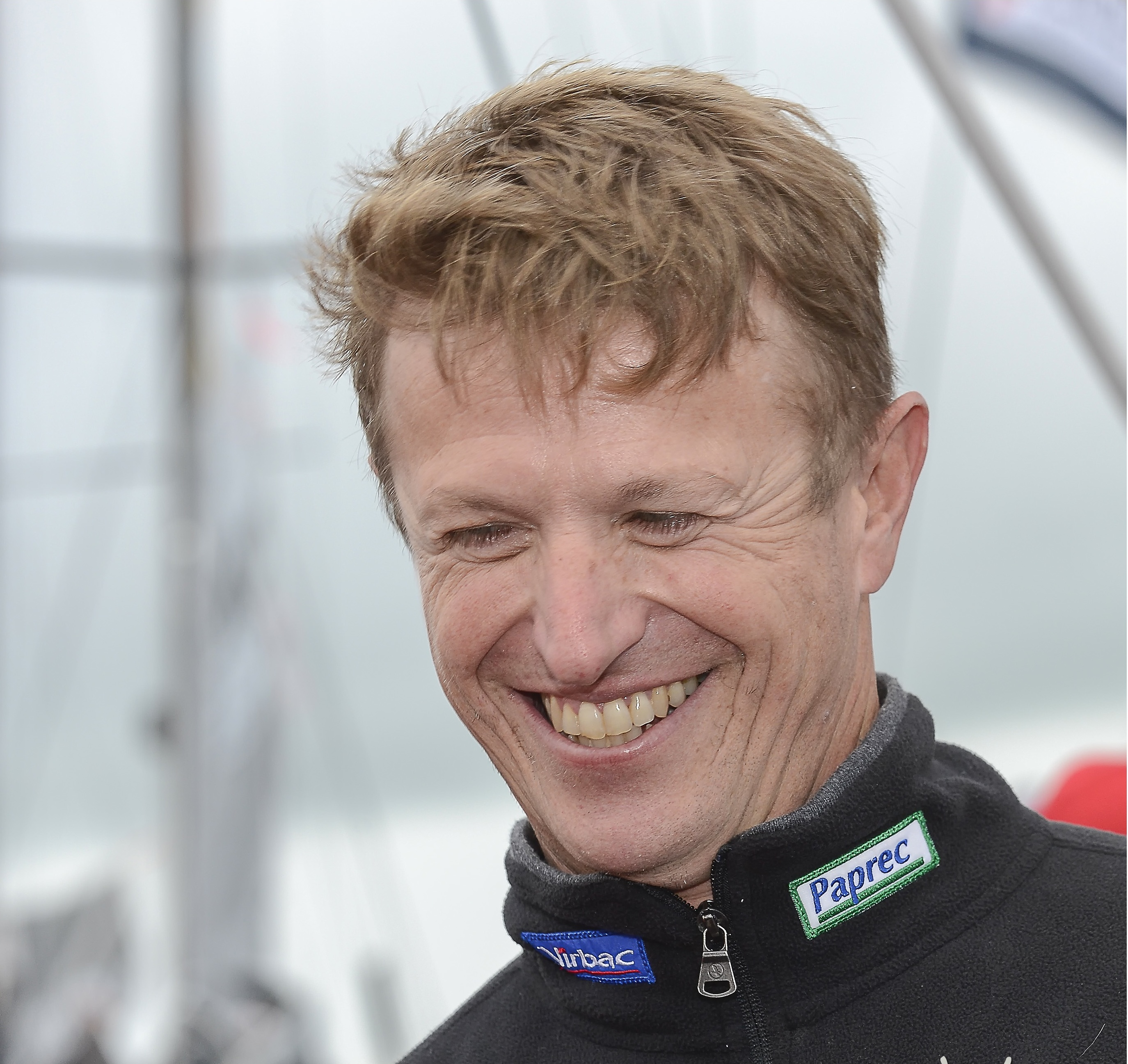
Jean-Pierre Dick (FRA)
Virbac-Paprec 3

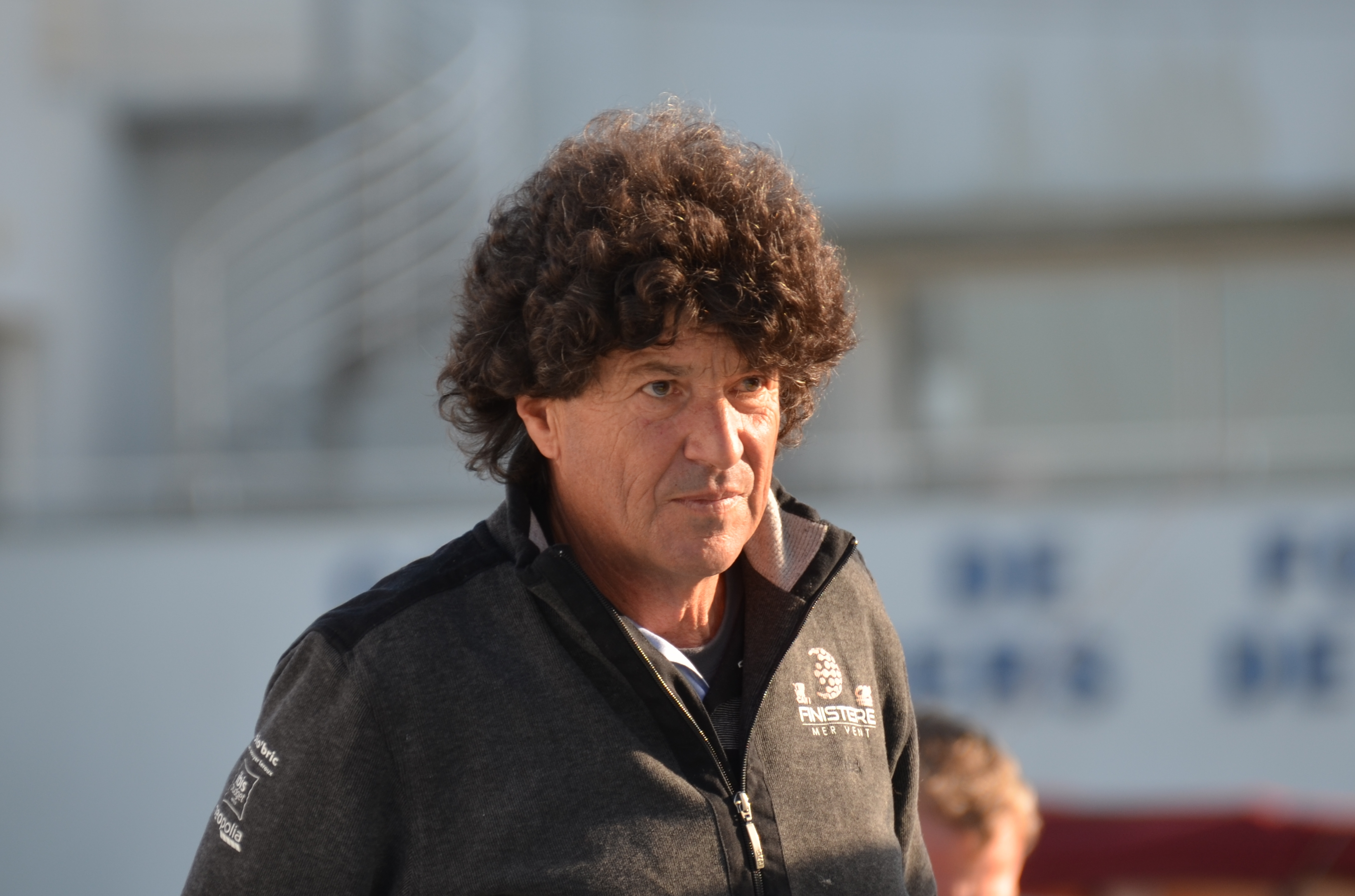
Jean Le Cam (FRA)
SynerCiel

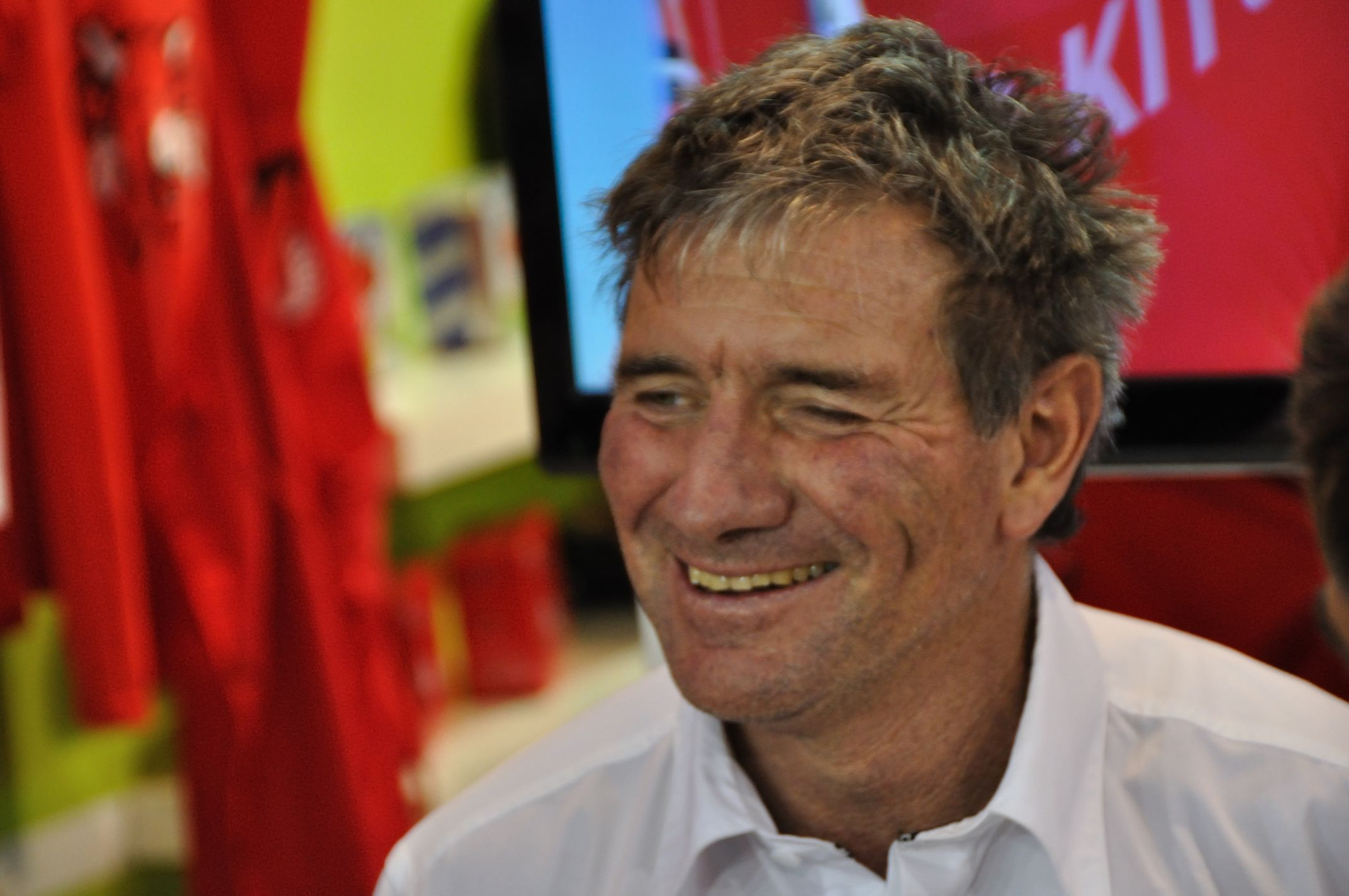
Kito de Pavant (FRA)
Groupe Bel

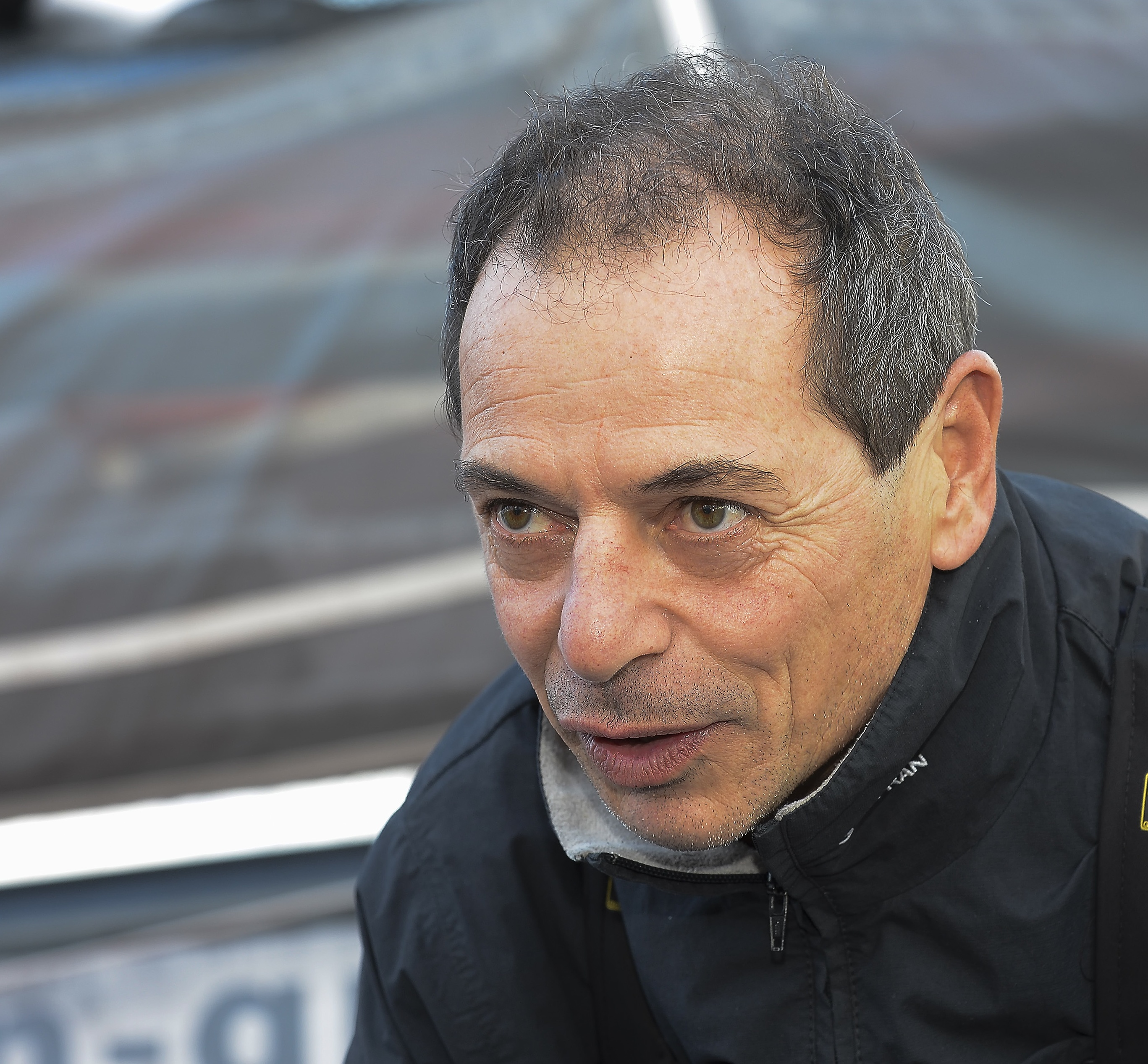
Marc Guillemot (FRA)
Safran 2

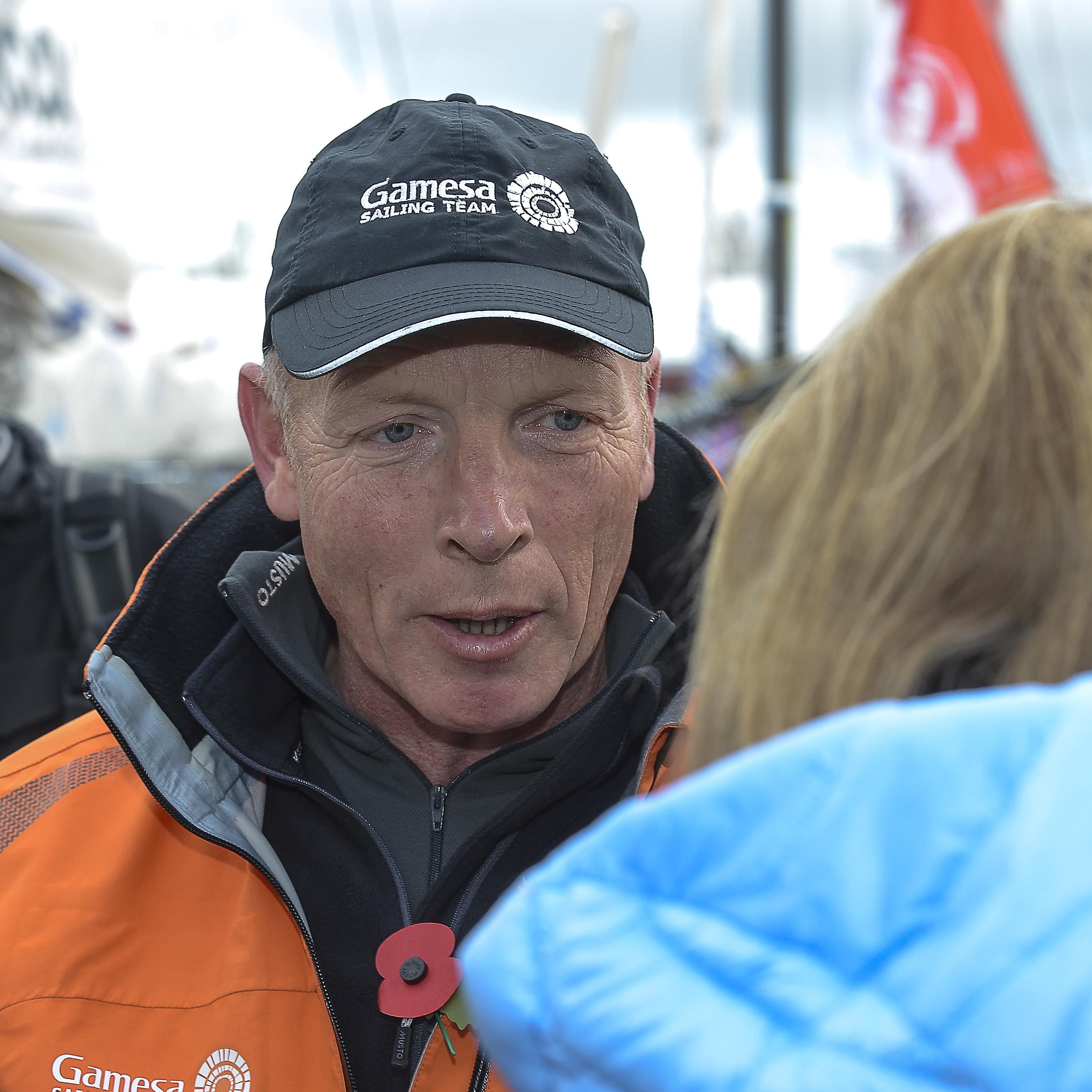
Mike Golding (GBR)
Gamesa

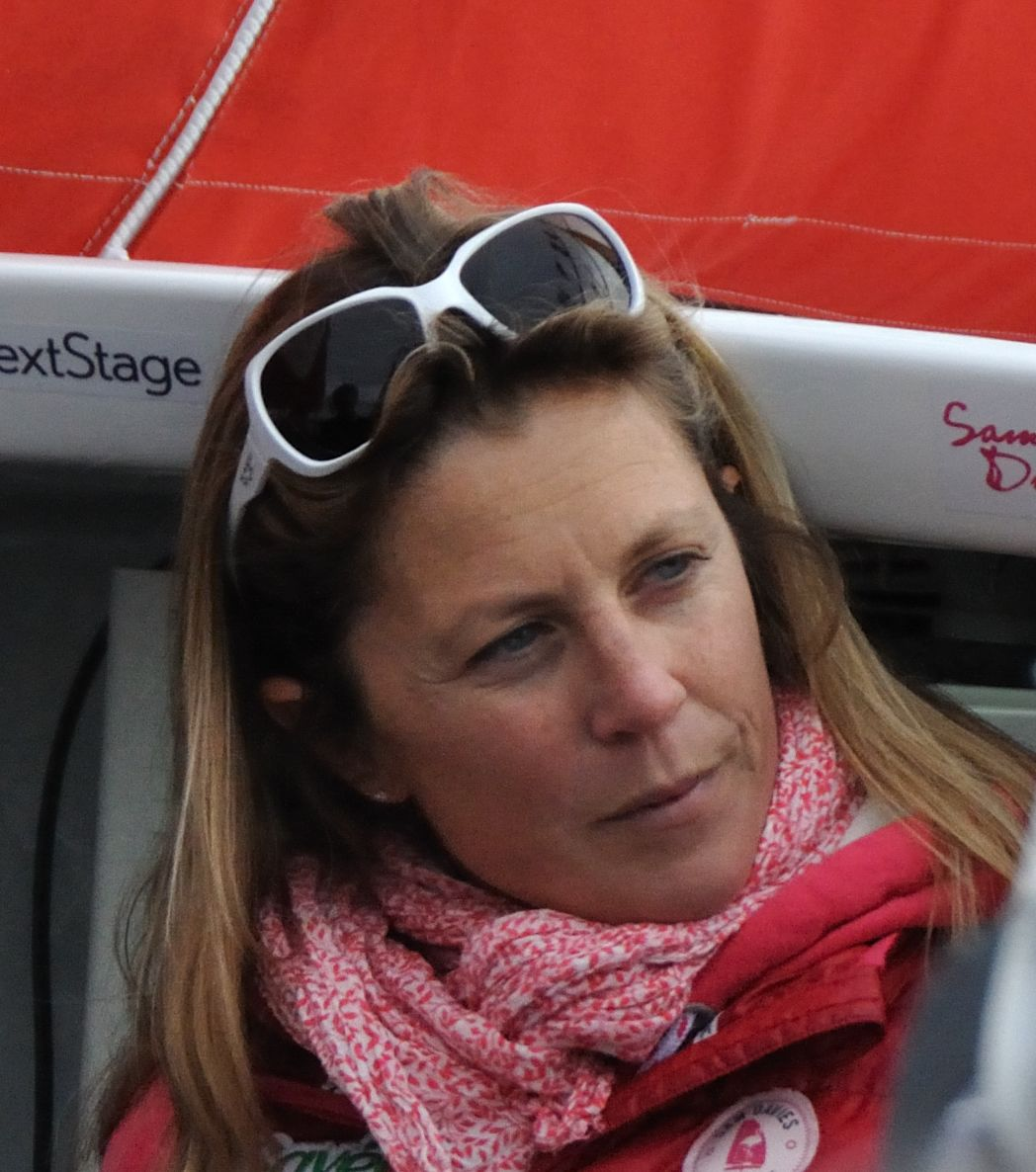
Samantha Davies (GBR)
Savéol

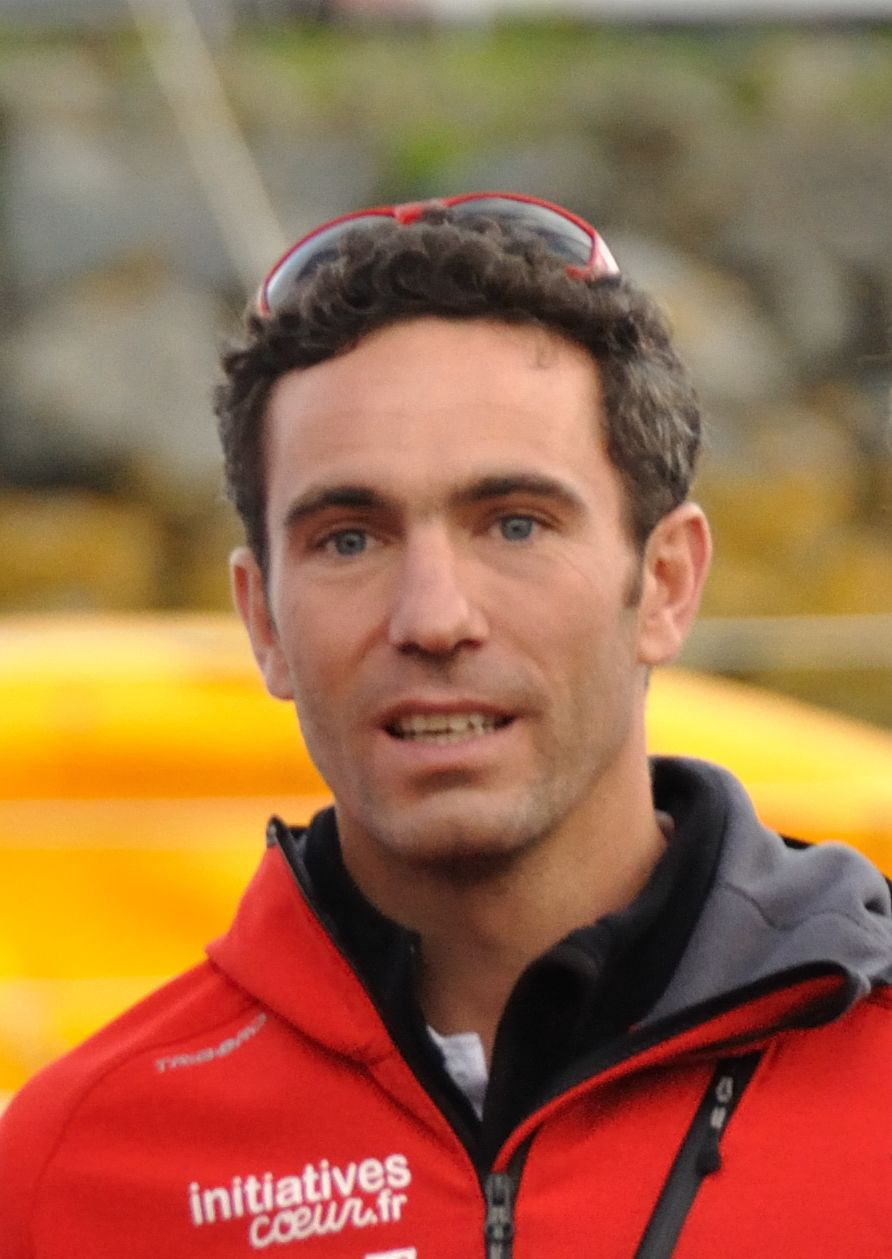
Tanguy De Lamotte (FRA)
Initiatives-Cœur (1)

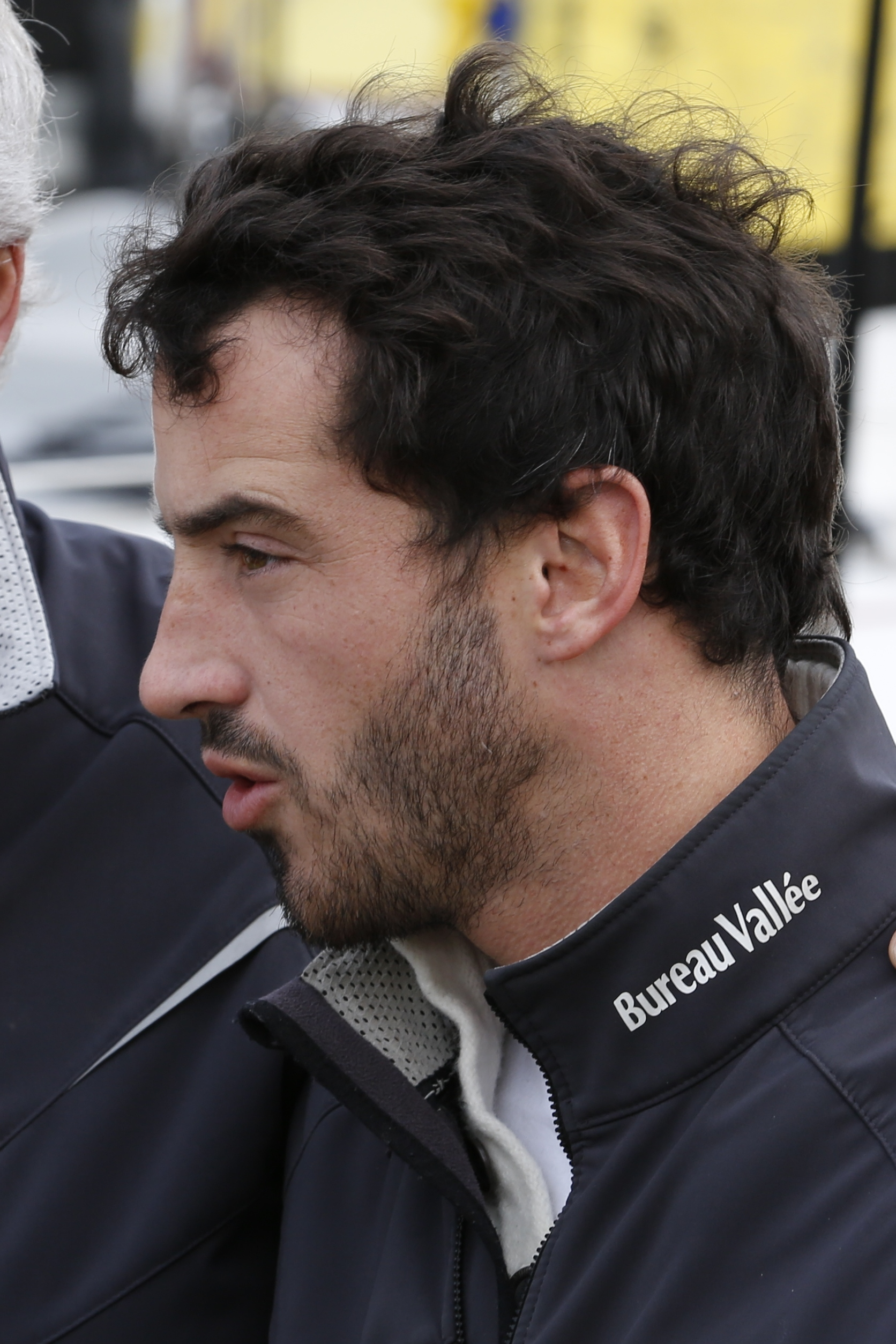
Louis Burton (FRA)
Bureau Vallée (1)

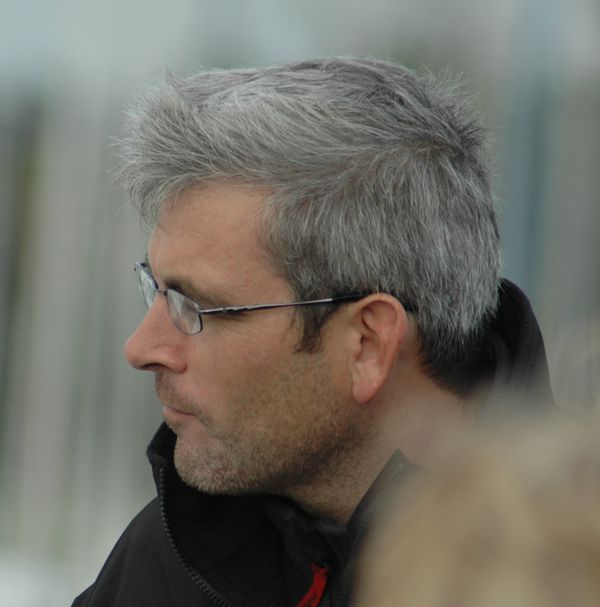
Vincent Riou (FRA)
PRB 4

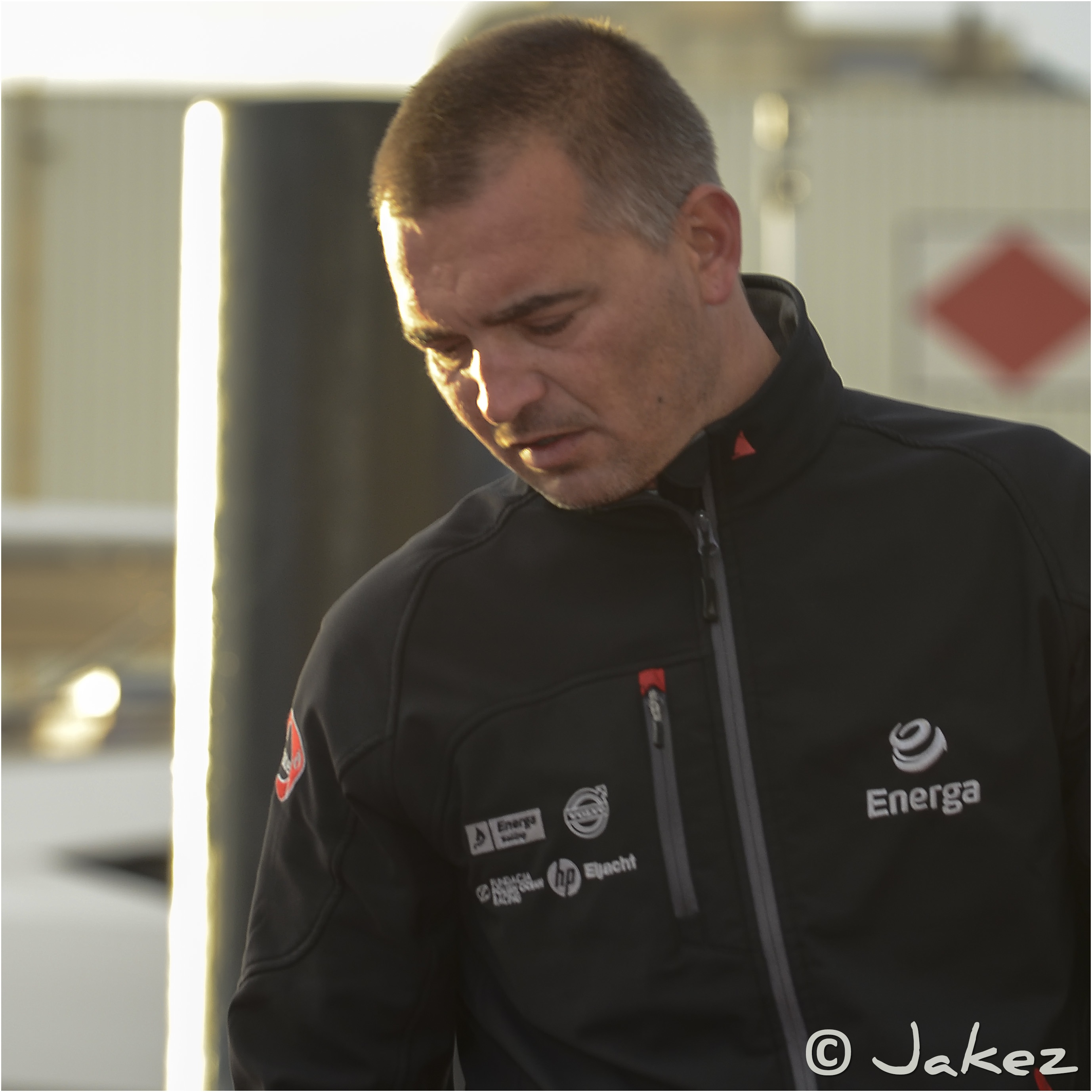
Zbigniew Gutkowski (FRA)
Energa

=== List of participant and equipment used ===
List of participants and equipment used
Skipper	Prev. participation (Start/Finish)	Name of boat	Sail no.	Naval architect	Builder	Launch date	Ref.
Alessandro Di Benedetto (ITA) (FRA)	Never	Team Plastique		Finot-Conq	Kirié (FRA)	1998	
Alex Thomson (GBR)	2 / 0	Hugo Boss 4	GBR 99	Farr Yacht Design	Offshore Challenge, Cowes (GBR)	2007	
Armel Le Cléac’h (FRA)	1 / 1 (2nd)	Banque Populaire		Verdier / VPLP	Green Marine (GBR); CDK Technologies (FRA)	2010	
Arnaud Boissières (FRA)	1 / 1 (8th)	Akena Vérandas (3)		Farr Yacht Design	CDK Technologies (FRA)	2006	
Bernard Stamm (SUI)	2 / 0	Cheminées Poujoulat (5)	SUI 2012	Kouyoumdjian	Decision SA (SUI)	2011	
Bertrand De Broc (FRA)	2 / 0	Votre Nom autour du Monde – EDM Projects		Finot – Conq	Multiplast	2007	
Dominique Wavre (SUI)	3 / 2 (4th)	Mirabaud	SUI 09	Owen Clark	Southern Ocean Marine	2006	
François Gabart (FRA)	Never	Macif	FRA 301	Verdier / VPLP	CDK Technologies; Green Marine	2011	
Javier Sanso (ESP)	1 / 0	Acciona 100% EcoPowered	ESP 04	Owen Clarke Design	Southern Ocean Marine NZL	2011	
Jean Le Cam (FRA)	2 / 1 (2nd)	SynerCiel	FRA 59	Farr Yacht Design	Southern Ocean Marine NZL	2007	
Jean-Pierre Dick (FRA)	2 / 1 (6th)	Virbac-Paprec 3	FRA 06	Verdier / VPLP	Cookson Boats (NZL)	2010	
Jérémie Beyou (FRA)	1 / 0	Maître CoQ		Farr Yacht Design	CDK technologie-Mer Agitée	2007	
Kito de Pavant (FRA)	1 / 0	Groupe Bel	FRA 360	Verdier / VPLP	Indiana Yachting (ITA)	2007	
Louis Burton (FRA)	Never	Bureau Vallée (1)	FRA 35	Farr Yacht Design	JMV	2006	
Marc Guillemot (FRA)	1 / 1 (4th)	Safran 2	FRA 25	Verdier / VPLP	Chantier Naval de Laros	2007	
Mike Golding (GBR)	3 / 2 (3rd)	Gamesa	GBR 3	Owen Clark	Hake Marine (NZL)	2007	
Samantha Davies (GBR)	1 / 1 (5th)	Savéol		Marc Lombard (2004); Juan Kouyoumdjian (2007)	JMV	2004	
Tanguy De Lamotte (FRA)	Never	Initiatives Cœur (1)		Marc Lombard	MAG (FRA)	1998	
Vincent Riou (FRA)	1 / 0	PRB	FRA 85	Verdier / VPLP	Shipyard of Larros; CDK shipyard	2010	
Zbigniew Gutkowski (POL)	Never	Energa		Group Finot	Jason Carrington; Neville Hutton	2007	
