= Alex Thomson (sailor) =

British yachtsman (born 1974)

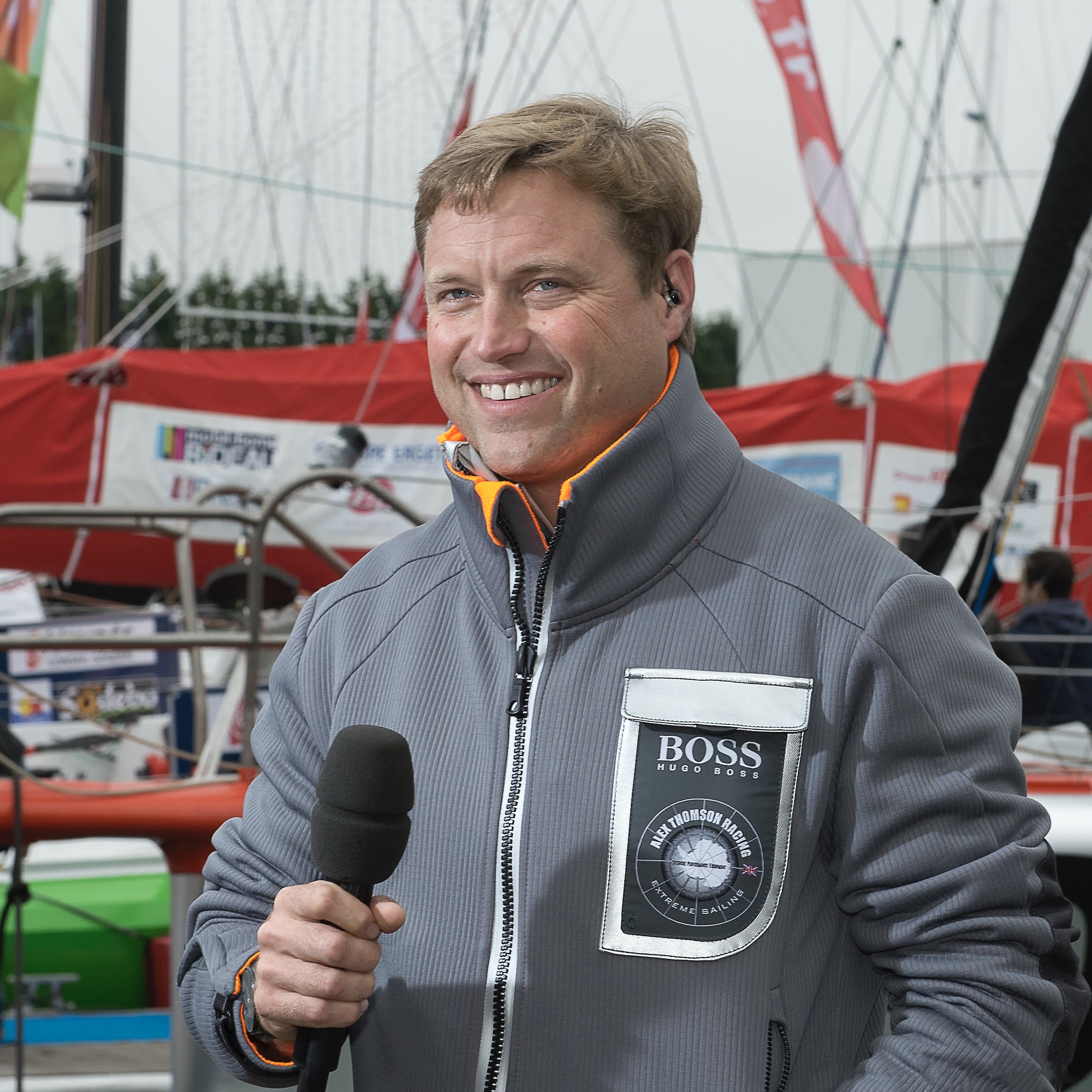
- Thomson before the start of the Vendée Globe in 2012
- Born: 18 April 1974 (age 52); Bangor, North Wales
- Occupation: Yachtsman
- Spouse: Kate Thomson
- Children: 2
- Parent(s): Peter and Jan Thomson
- Relatives: Twin sister Sarah, younger brother David.
- Website: www.alexthomsonracing.com

Alex Thomson (born 18 April 1974, Bangor, Wales) is a British yachtsman.

Alex Thomson was helped early in his sailing career by Sir Keith Mills, the British businessman who ran London's successful bid to host the 2012 Olympic Games and Paralympic Games and set up with British America's Cup campaign TEAMORIGIN. With Mills' backing, Thomson broke into the professional solo sailing circuit at a young age.

Thomson's Clipper Race win in 1999 made him the youngest skipper ever to win a round-the-world yacht race. As of February 2016 he still holds this record. He is an around the world solo sailor, and held the 24-hour world speed sailing record for solo mono-hulls (537 nautical miles at an average speed of 22.4 knots).

Sponsored by Hugo Boss he took part in the Vendée Globe 2004/05 but was forced to retire after damage to the carbon fitting that attached the boom to the deck. He also started in 2008, but had to retire from the race after a cracked hull. He was third in 2012 and second in the 2016 edition. During the latter edition, Thomson set new fastest reference times from Les Sables d'Olonne to the Equator (9 days 7 h 02 min) and the Cape of Good Hope (17 days 22 h 58 min).

However, 13 days into the race Hugo Boss's starboard foil broke after hitting an unidentified floating object, therefore hampering Alex's progress throughout the rest of the course. Of note, most of the race takes place on port tack, that is, the boat would have made good use of the missing starboard foil. Despite his foil and anemometer/autopilot problems, Thomson finished the race with the second fastest time on record – 74 days 19 h 35 min 15 sec, 16h behind Armel Le Cléac'h.

In the 2019 Transat Jacques Vabre race, Thomson's $7.7 million racing yacht was struck by a submerged object, forcing Thomson and his co-skipper Neal McDonald to make repairs to stabilise the boat.

== Career highlights ==
| Pos | Year | Race | Class | Boat name | Notes | Ref |
Round the world races
| DNF | 2021 | 2020–2021 Vendée Globe | IMOCA 60 | Hugo Boss 7 | Retired to Cape Town | |
| 2 / 29 | 2017 | 2016–2017 Vendée Globe | IMOCA 60 | Hugo Boss 6 | 74d 19h 35min 15sec | |
| DNF | 2014 | Barcelona World Race | IMOCA 60 | Hugo Boss 5 | with Pepe Ribes boat was dismasted | |
| 3 / 20 | 2013 | 2012–2013 Vendée Globe | IMOCA 60 | Hugo Boss 4 | 80d 19h 23min 43sec | |
| DNF | 2009 | 2008–2009 Vendée Globe | IMOCA 60 | GBR 99 - Hugo Boss 2 | day 6: cracked hull | |
| DNF | 2006 | Velux 5 Oceans Race | IMOCA 60 | GBR 99 - Hugo Boss | Abandon Boat rescued by Mike Golding | |
| DNF | 2005 | 2004–2005 Vendée Globe | IMOCA 60 | GBR 88 - Hugo Boss | Hole in the deck | |
| 1 | 1998 | Clipper Round the World Race | Clipper 60 | Ariel | | |
Transatlantic Races
| 3 | 2018 | Route du Rhum | IMOCA 60 | Hugo Boss | 1st on the water | |
| 2 | 2011 | Transat Jacques Vabre | IMOCA 60 | Hugo Boss | with Guillermo Altadill (ESP) | |
| 7 | 1999 | Transat Jacques Vabre | IMOCA 60 | Gatamore | with Josh Hall (GBR) | |
Other significant races

== Boats owned ==
| Name | Sail No. | Years owned | Year Launched | Launched name | Builder | Designer | Key races | Notes | Ref |
|---|---|---|---|---|---|---|---|---|---|
| Hugo Boss | GBR88 | 2004 - 2006 | 1999 | Sill | Chantier Mag (FRA) | Lombard | 2004-2005 Vendee Globe and Velux 5 Oceans Race | Boat lost in Southern Ocean | |
| Hugo Boss 2 | | 2007 - 2012 | 2007 | New Build | Jason Carrington (GBR); Neville Hutton (GBR) | Group Finot | 2008-2009 Vendee Globe | | |
| Hugo Boss 3 | GBR 99 | 2009 - 2014 | 2007 | PINDAR | Cookson (NZL) | Juan Kouyoumdjian | | Boat written off while on charter | |
| Hugo Boss 4 | GBR 99 | 2011 - 2015 | 2007 | Estrella Damm | Offshore Challenges (GBR) | Farr Yacht Design | 2012-2013 Vendee Globe | | |
| Hugo Boss 5 | GBR 99 | 2014 - 2014 | 2009 | Virbac-Paprec 3 | Cookson Boat (NZL) | Lauriot-Prévost G. Verdier | Barcelona World Race | | |
| Hugo Boss 6 | GBR 99 | 2015 - 2019 | 2015 | New Build | Green Marine (GBR) | Lauriot-Prévost G. Verdier | 2016-2017 Vendee Globe | | |
| Hugo Boss 7 | GBR | 2019 - 2021 | 2019 | New Build | Carrington Boats (GBR) | VP-Lauriot-Prévost | 2020-2021 Vendee Globe | | |

== Records ==
- 2007: Monohull (up to 60 feet) 24-hour distance record with Andrew Cape: 501.3 nautical miles
- 2012: Monohull (up to 60 feet) singlehanded transatlantic sailing record: 8 days 21 hours 8 minutes and 31 seconds
- 2017: Monohull singlehanded 24-hour distance record: 536.8 nautical miles
- 2018: Route du Rhum IMOCA60 Class 11 days 23 hours 10 minutes 58 seconds
