= IMOCA 60 Acciona =

Sailboat

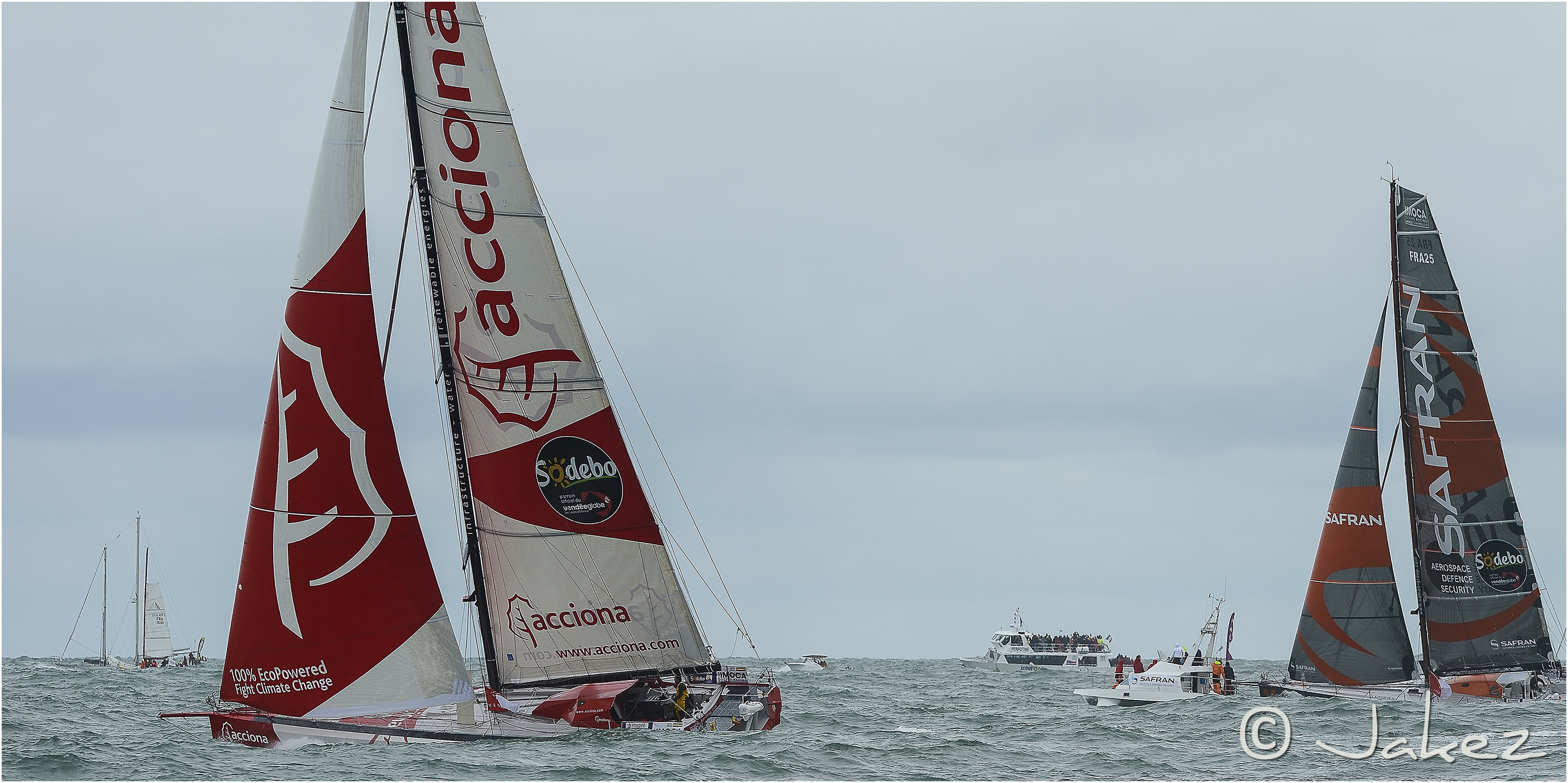

Development
- Designer: Owen Clarke Design, Mervyn Owen, Allen Clarke
- Year: 2 September 2011
- Builder: Southern Ocean Marine (NZL)

Racing
- Class association: IMOCA 60

The IMOCA 60 class yacht, Acciona 100% Ecopowered, ESP 04, was designed by Owen Clark Design and launched on 2nd Sept 2011 after being made by Southern Ocean Marine in New Zealand.

== Names and ownership ==
Emira (baptismal name)

Acciona (2011-2017)

- Skipper: Javier Sanso

Offshore Team Germany (2017-2021)

- Skipper: Robert Stanjek

Canada Ocean Racing (2022-2023)

- Skipper: Scott Shawyer

Be Water Positive (since 2023)

- Skipper: Scott Shawyer
- Sail no.: CAN 80

== Racing results ==
Pos	Year	Race	Class	Boat name	Skipper	Notes	Ref
Round the world races
DNF	2013	2012-2013 Vendée Globe	IMOCA 60	Acciona 100% Ecopowered	Javier Sanso (ESP)		
Transatlantic Races
Other Races
1 / 7	2021	The Ocean Race Europe	IMOCA 60	Offshore Team Germany, GER 21	PhilLip Kasüske; Annie Lush; Benjamin Dutreux +Others		
