= Zbigniew Gutkowski =

French offshore sailor and navigator

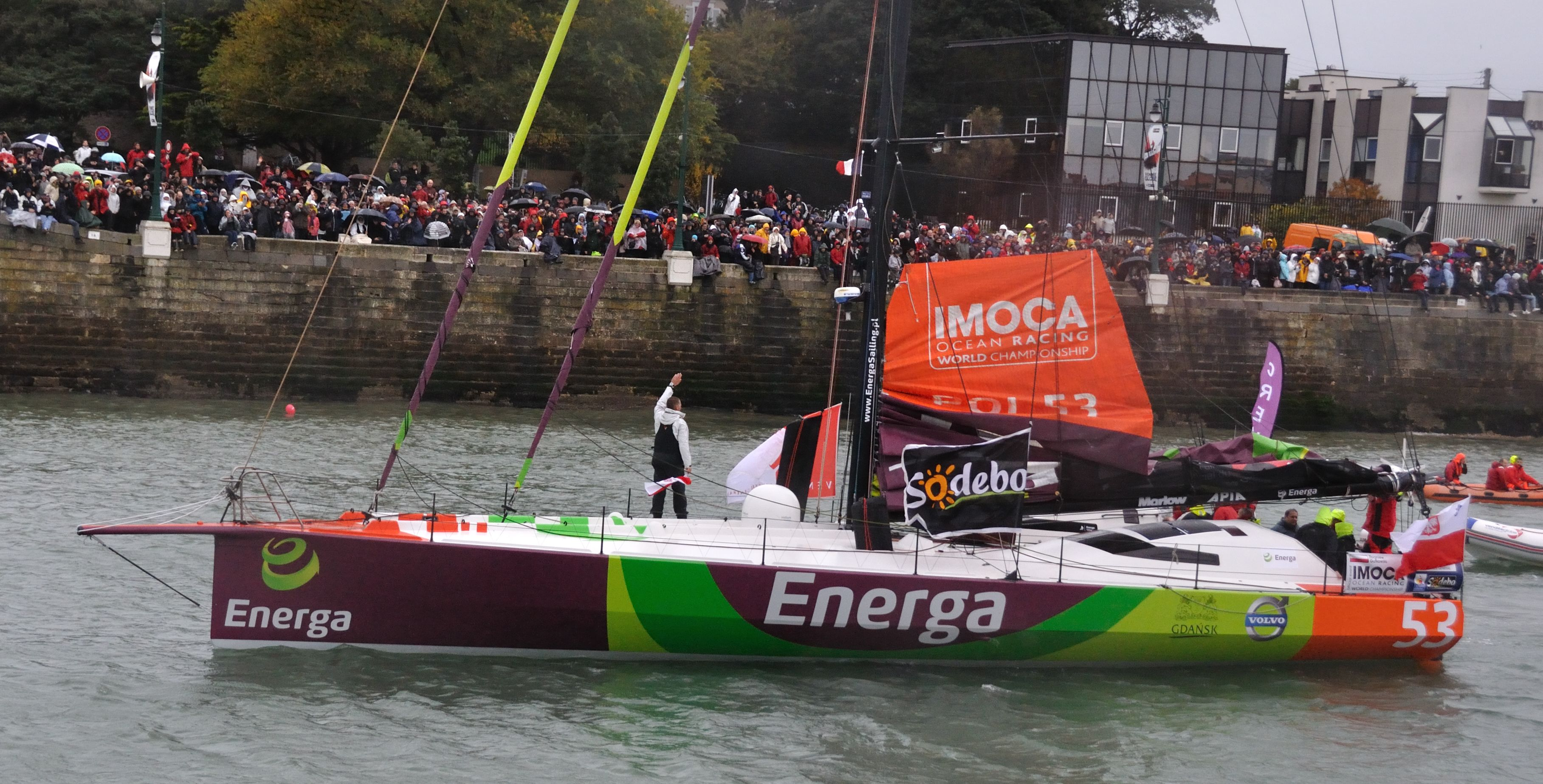

Personal information
- Nationality: Polish
- Born: 24 June 1973 (age 53) Gdańsk, Poland

Sailing career
- Sport: Sailing
- Club: Gdańsk Shipyard Yacht Club
- Class: IMOCA 60

Zbigniew Gutkowski (born 24 June 1973) is a Polish professional offshore sailor.

== Biography ==
Gutkowski was born on 24 June 1973 in Gdańsk. From 2012, he is the skipper of the IMOCA Energa. On 21 November 2012, he announced that he was abandoning the Vendée Globe 2012–13 due to electronic problems in his sailboat, preventing him from having an autopilot.

== Sailing Career Highlights ==
2013

- 3rd Caribbean 600
- 7th Transat Jacques-Vabre 2013 with Maciej Marczewski

2012

- RET in the 2012-2013 Vendée Globe (Energa)

2010

- 2nd in the Velux 5 Oceans

2005

- 4th in the Nokia Oops Cup (ORMA 60 Bonduelle)

2004

- Attempted world record (Volvo Ocean 60 Bank BHP, ex-Assa Abloy), stop in Cape Town after hardware failure

2001

- 4th of The Race (watch leader on Warta-Polpharma)
