= IMOCA 60 Ecover 3 =

Sailboat

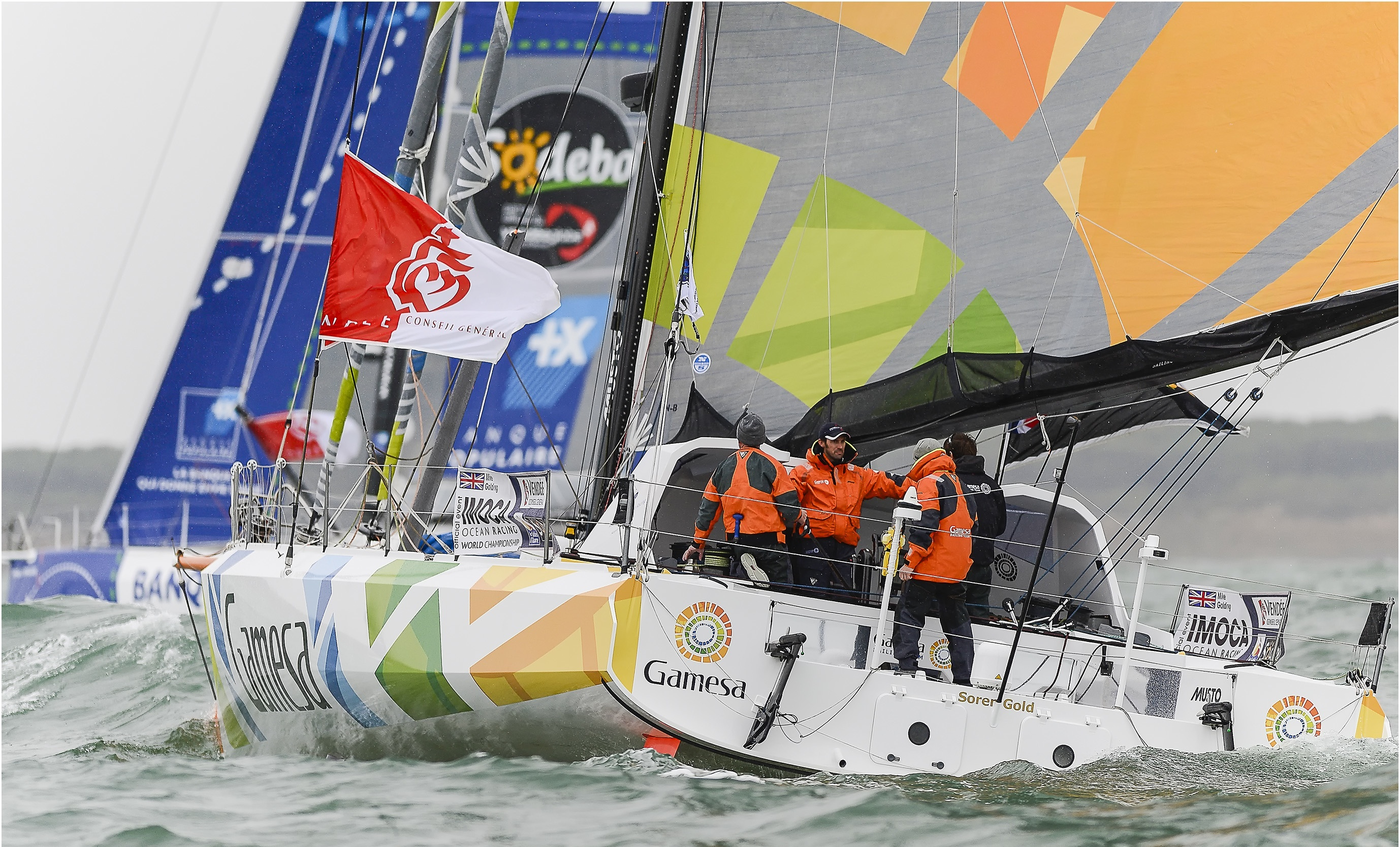

Development
- Designer: Owen Clarke Design, Mervyn Owen, Allen Clarke, Clay Oliver
- Year: 31 July 2007
- Builder: Hakes Marine (NZL)

Hull appendages
- Keel: Canting Keel
- Rudder: Twin Rudders

Racing
- Class association: IMOCA 60

The IMOCA 60 class yacht Ecover 3 was designed by Owen Clark Design, made by the New Zealand-based Hakes Marine and launched in September 2006. The boat is a sister ship to Aviva.

== Names and ownership ==
Ecover III (2006-2009)

- Skipper: Mike Golding

Mike Golding Racing (2010)

- Skipper: Mike Golding

Président (2010-2011)

- Skipper: Bruno Garcia and Jean Le Cam

Gamesa (2012-2013)

- Skipper: Mike Golding

Currency House Kilcullen (2015)

- Skipper: Enda O'Coineen

Kilcullen Voyager-Team Ireland (2016-2017)

- Skipper: Enda O'Coineen

La Mie Câline - Artipole (2017-2021)

- Skipper: Arnaud Boissières

RÊVE DE LARGE (2022)

- Skipper: Rodolphe Sepho

Nexans – Art & Fenêtres II (since 2023)

- Skipper: Fabrice Amedeo
- Sail no.: FRA 56

== Racing results ==
Pos	Year	Race	Class	Boat name	Skipper	Notes	Ref
Round the world races
15 / 33	2021	2020–2021 Vendée Globe	IMOCA 60	La Mie Caline - Artipole, FRA 14	Arnaud Boissieres (FRA)	94d 18h 36m	
DNF	2016	2016–2017 Vendée Globe	IMOCA 60	Kilcullen Voyager - Team Ireland, IRL 3	Enda O'Coineen (IRL)		
6 / 20	2013	2012–2013 Vendée Globe	IMOCA 60	Gamesa	Mike Golding (GBR)	88d 06h 36m	
DNF	2010	Barcelona World Race	IMOCA 60	Président, ESP 3	Bruno Garcia (ESP); Jean Le Cam (FRA)		
DNF	2009	2008–2009 Vendée Globe	IMOCA 60	Ecover 3	Mike Golding (GBR)		
Transatlantic Races
Other Races
