= 2013 Transat Jacques Vabre =

The 2013 Transat Jacques Vabre was the 11th edition and was raced from Le Havre, France, to Itajai, Brazil a course distance of 5395 Nautical Miles.

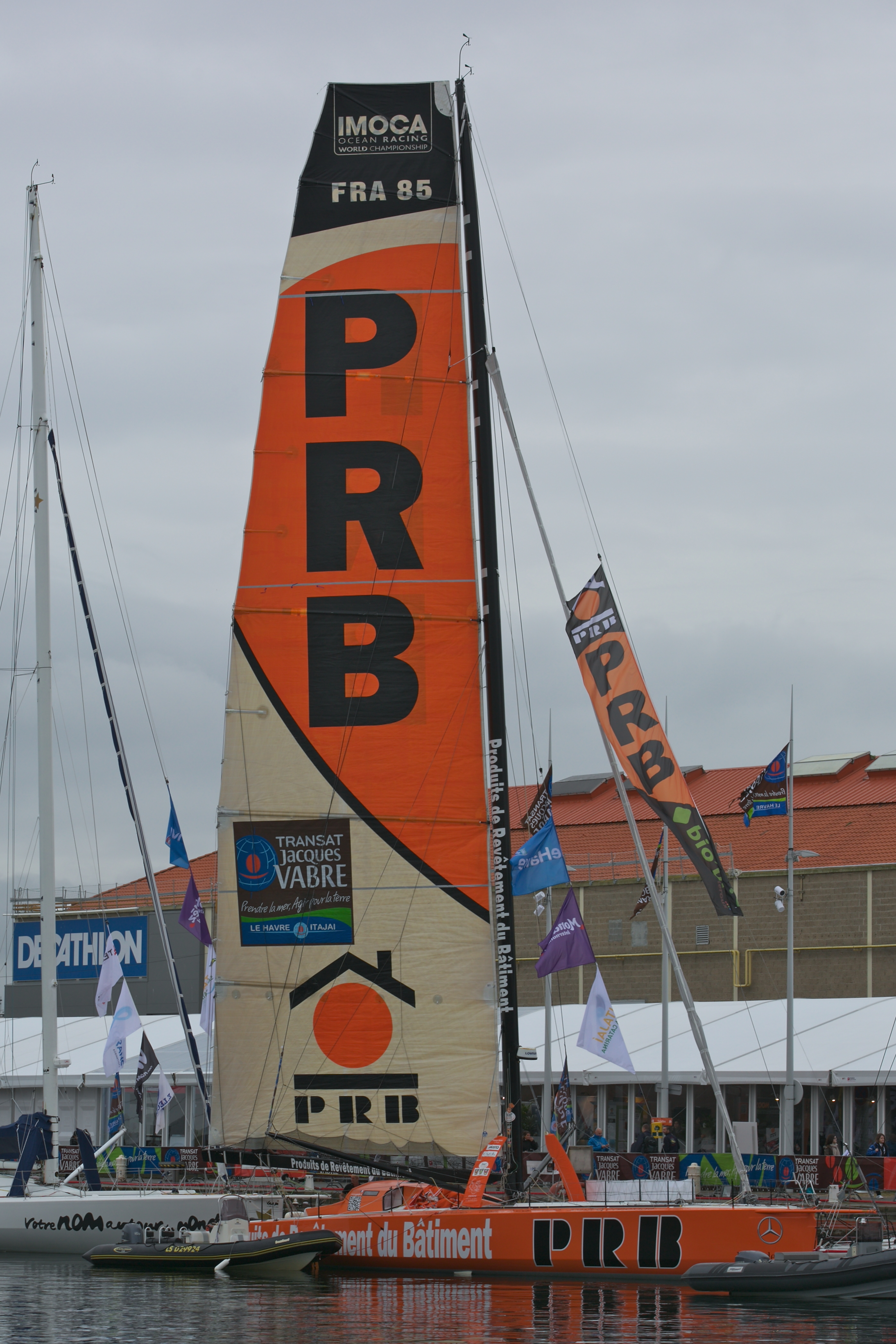
PRB, vainqueur de la catégorie IMOCA.

Storm Force 10 winds in the English Channel caused the postponement of the start to 7 November. The race was won by the MOD 70 Edmond de Rothschild skippered by Sebastien Josse and Charles Caudrelier. First monohull was PRB skippered by Vincent Riou and Jean Le Cam.

== MOD70 ==
Pos.	Crew	Boat name	Date Finish	Elapsed Time	Notes	Ref.
1	Sébastien Josse (France)	Edmond de Rothschild	11d 05h 03m 54s	22,00		
1	Charles Caudrelier (France)	Edmond de Rothschild	11d 05h 03m 54s	22,00		
2	Sidney Gavignet (France)	Oman Air-Musandam	11d 10h 04m 09s	21,70		
2	Damian Foxall (Republic of Ireland)	Oman Air-Musandam	11d 10h 04m 09s	21,70		

== IMOCA ==
Pos.	Crew	Boat name	Boat Age	Date Finish	Elapsed Time	Notes	Ref.
1	Vincent Riou (FRA); Jean Le Cam (FRA)	PRB (4)		17d 00h 41m 47s	14,12		
2	Marc Guillemot (FRA); Pascal Bidégorry (FRA)	Safran (2)		17d 04h 43m 23s	13,93		
3	Jérémie Beyou (FRA); Christopher Pratt (FRA)	Maître CoQ III		17d 05h 15m 07s	13,90		
4	Bernard Stamm (SUI); Philippe Legros (FRA)	Cheminées Poujoulat (3)		17d 12h 19m 44s	13,68		
5	Louis Burton (FRA); Guillaume Le Brec (FRA)	Bureau Vallée (1)		20d 02h 18m 45s	12,28		
6	Bertrand de Broc (FRA); Arnaud Boissières (FRA)	Votre Nom autour du Monde		20d 04h 34m 05s	12,14		
7	Zbigniew Gutkowski (POL); Maciej Marczewski (POL)	Energa		20d 10h 47m 17s	12,23		
8	Tanguy de Lamotte (FRA); François Damiens (BEL)	Initiatives Cœur (2)		21d 03h 55m 46s	11,55		
9	Alessandro Di Benedetto (ITA); Alberto Monaco (ITA)	Team Plastique		21d 03h 55m 55s	11,32		
DNF	François Gabart (FRA); Michel Desjoyeaux (FRA)	Macif		21 Abandon			

== Class 40 ==
Pos.	Boat.				Crew	Elapsed Time	Delta	%	Rhum Knots	Distance Sailed	Water Knots	Ref.
Pos.	S/N	Boat name	Model	Age	Name	Elapsed Time	Delta	%	Rhum Knots	Distance Sailed	Water Knots	Ref.
1	FRA 130	GDF Suez	Mach 40	2013	Sébastien Rogues (FRA); Fabien Delahaye (FRA)	20d 21h 41m 25s	d 0h 0m 0	0	10.75	5578.7	11.12	
2	123	Tales Santander 2014	Botin	2013	Alex Pella (ESP); Pablo Santurde (ESP)	21d 01h 22m 15s	0d 03h 40m 50	0.73	10.68	5661.5	11.2	
3	FRA 115	Mare	Mach 40	2012	Jörg Riechers (GER); Pierre Brasseur (FRA)	21d 03h 21m 55s	0d 05h 40m 30	1.13	10.63	5668.7	11.17	
4	FRA 98	Watt&Sea, Région Poitou-Charentes	Tyker 40 Evolution 2	2010	Yannick Bestaven (FRA); Aurélien Ducroz (FRA)	22d 08h 14m 46s	1d 10h 33m 21	6.89	10.06	5620.7	10.48	
5	FRA 85	Groupe Picoty	Pogo 40S2	2010	Jean-Christophe Caso (FRA); Aymeric Chappellier (FRA)	22d 10h 26m 47s	1d 12h 45m 22	7.33	10.02	5637.8	10.47	
6	FRA 81	SNCF - Geodis	Akilaria RC2	2009	Fabrice Amedeo (FRA); Armel Tripon (FRA)	22d 10h 54m 39s	1d 13h 13m 14	7.42	10.01	5638.7	10.46	
7	FRA 131	ERDF - Des pieds et des mains	Akilaria RC 3	2013	Damien Seguin (FRA); Yoann Richomme (FRA)	22d 12h 14m 14s	1d 14h 32m 49	7.68	9.99	5601.2	10.37	
8	MLT 125	Vaquita	Custom Humphreys	2013	Christof Petter (AUT); Andreas Hanakamp (AUT)	22d 13h 39m 33s	1d 15h 58m 08	7.97	9.96	5697.9	10.52	
9	FRA 101	Campagne de France	Pogo 40S2	2011	Halvard Mabire (FRA); Miranda Merron (GBR)	22d 23h 47m 47s	2d 02h 06m 22	9.99	9.78	5610.4	10.17	
10	65	Phoenix Europe	Akilaria Mk2 (Proto)	2008	Louis Duc (FRA); Stéphanie Alran (FRA)	23d 02h 40m 07s	2d 04h 58m 42	10.56	9.73	5679.4	10.24	
11	FRA 107	Solidaires en Peloton	Kiwi 40FC	2011	Victorien Erussard (FRA); Thibaut Vauchel-Camus (FRA)	23d 10h 02m 05s	2d 12h 20m 40	12.03	9.6	5858.3	10.42	
12	ITA 117	BET1128	BM40	2012	Gaetano Mura (ITA); Sam Manuard (FRA)	23d 10h 29m 48s	2d 12h 48m 23	12.12	9.59	5637.2	10.02	
13	126	Fantastica	Owen C	2009	Stefano Raspadori (ITA); Pietro D'Ali (ITA)	23d 11h 43m 40s	2d 14h 02m 15	12.37	9.57	5798.2	10.29	
14	132	Caterham Challenge	Akilaria RC 3	2013	Mike Gascoyne (GBR); Brian Thompson (GBR)	23d 16h 36m 10s	2d 18h 54m 45	13.34	9.49	5709.8	10.04	
15	79	Matouba	Owen C	2009	Bertrand Guillonneau (FRA); Sébastien Audigane (FRA)	24d 22h 12m 15s	4d 00h 30m 50	19.24	9.02	5810.4	9.71	
16	104	Proximedia - Sauvez mon enfant	Mach40	2011	Denis Van Weynbergh (BEL); Jean-Edouard Criquioche (FRA)	24d 22h 24m 21s	4d 00h 42m 56	19.28	9.02	5809.1	9.71	
17	109	Mr Bricolage	Pogo 40S2	2011	Damien Rousseau (FRA); Matthieu Alluin (FRA)	24d 23h 40m 40s	4d 01h 59m 15	19.53	9	5918.1	9.87	
18	88	Eärwen	Tyker 40 Evolution 2	2010	Catherine Pourre (FRA); Goulven Royer (FRA)	25d 00h 43m 45s	4d 03h 02m 20	19.74	8.98	5801	9.66	
19	105	April-Deltacolor	Akilaria	2011	Lionel Reginer (FRA); Tim Darni (FRA)	25d 16h 24m 15s	4d 18h 42m 50	22.87	8.75	5714.3	9.27	
20	60	Obportus 3	JPK40	2007	Philippe Burger (FRA); Olivier Roussey (FRA)	26d 17h 28m 15s	5d 19h 46m 50	27.86	8.41	5898.4	9.2	
21	64	Croix du Sud	Akilaria	2007	Michelle Zwagerman (AUS); Patrick Conway (AUS)	26d 23h 23m 28s	6d 01h 42m 03	29.04	8.33	5673.4	8.76	
22	10	EcoÉlec - Fantronic	Pogo 40S1	2006	Eric Darni (FRA); Florent Bernard (FRA)	28d 04h 49m 20s	7d 07h 07m 55	34.91	7.97	5864.4	8.66	
23	90	11th hour racing	Jaz	2009	Hannah Jenner (GBR); Rob Windsor (GBR)	30d 04h 28m 25s	9d 06h 47m 00	44.41	7.45	6298.8	8.69	
ABN	119	Dunkerque - Planète Enfants	Tyker Evolution 3	2012	Bruno Jourdren (FRA); Thomas Ruyant (FRA)	14 November 2013	Medical Isuesd	1073				
ABN	129	Concise 8	McConaghy Ker40	2013	Ned Collier Wakefield (GBR); Sam Goodchild (GBR)	13 November 2013 Abandon (Perte d'un safran)	712					
ABN	89	Marie-Galante	Akilaria	2010	Wilfrid Clerton (FRA); Dominique Rivard (FRA)	10 November 2013 Abandon (Bôme endommagée)	371					
