= Transat Café-L'Or =

Transatlantic yacht race

- First held: 1993
- Type: Double-handed offshore race
- Classes: Class40, IMOCA 60, Multi 50, Ultime
- Start: Le Havre
- Finish: Various

The Transat Café-L'Or (formerly: Transat Jacques Vabre) is a yachting race that follows the historic coffee trading route between France and Brazil. It is named after (and sponsored by) a French brand of coffee.

The course was drawn up back in 1993 to follow in the wake of the clippers transporting coffee from Brazil to France. The Transat Jacques Vabre is a major date on the calendar, taking place every other year in odd years. It is a two-person race and the pairs of sailors are formed according to their complementary skills, what they have in common and how they get on. Boats leave from Le Havre, France's leading coffee importing port, going to Salvador de Bahia, in Brazil, the world's leading coffee grower and exporter (4,335 miles). The first edition in 1993 was a single-handed race.

The event is open to multihulls and monohulls from the following classes: Ultims (multihulls between 70 and 105 feet), IMOCA (60 feet monohulls), Multi 50 and Class40. All kinds of navigational aids are allowed in particular for routing, except for the Class40 boats (as this is forbidden in their own rules).

In 2025 the name of the race was changed to Transat Café-L'Or.

Ed.	1	2	3	4	5	6	7	8	9	10	11	12	13	14	15	16	17
Year	1993	1995	1997	1999	2001	2003	2005	2007	2009	2011	2013	2015	2017	2019	2021	2023	2025
ORMA	•	•	•	•	•	•	•	•									
MOD70											•						
Ultim 32/23												•	•		•	•	•
Multi50/Open Fifty			•	•	•	•	•	•	•	•	•	•	•	•	•	•	•
IMOCA 60	•	•	•	•	•	•	•	•	•	•	•	•	•	•	•	•	•
Class40								•		•	•	•	•	•	•	•	•
Total de bateaux	13	11	18	20	33	38	35	60	20	36	44	42	38	59	79	95	

Ed.	Year	Start	Finish	Classes	Length of route
1	1993	Le Havre France	Carthagene Colombia		
2	1995	Le Havre France	Carthagene Colombia		
3	1997	Le Havre France	Carthagene Colombia		
4	1999	Le Havre France	Carthagene Colombia		
5	2001	Le Havre France	Salvador, Bahia Brazil		
6	2003	Le Havre France	Salvador, Bahia Brazil		
7	2005	Le Havre France	Salvador, Bahia Brazil	All	4340
8	2007	Le Havre France	Salvador, Bahia Brazil		
9	2009	Le Havre France	Puerto Limón Costa Rica		
10	2011	Le Havre France	Puerto Limón Costa Rica	Monohulls; Multi	4730; 5323
11	2013	Le Havre France	Itajaí Brazil	All	5400
12	2015	Le Havre France	Itajaí Brazil	All	5400
13	2017	Le Havre France	Salvador, Bahia Brazil	All	4350
14	2019	Le Havre France	Salvador, Bahia Brazil	All	4350
15	2021	Le Havre France	Fort-de-France Martinique France	Ultime; IMOCA; Class40	7500; 5800; 4600
16	2023	Le Havre France; Lorient France	Fort-de-France Martinique France	Ultime; Multi50; IMOCA; Class40	7500; 4200; 3750; 4045
17	2025	Le Havre France	Fort-de-France Martinique France	Ultime; Multi50; IMOCA; Class40	6200; 4600; 4350; 3750

== Winners ==
=== IMOCA 60 – Winners ===
Ed	Year	Crew	Boat name	Year Launched	Elapsed Time	Speed (Rhum/Water)	Dist.
1	1993	Yves Parlier (FRA) (solo race)	Cacolac d'Aquitaine	1990	18d 23h 38m		
2	1995	Fred Dahirel (FRA); Jean Maurel (FRA)	Côtes d'Or	1992	21d 08h 40m		
3	1997	Eric Tabarly (FRA); Yves Parlier (FRA)	Aquitaine Innovations	1996	19d 23h 19m	9.18 / ??	
4	1999	Hervé Jan (FRA); Thomas Coville (FRA)	Sodebo	1998	19d 17h 31m	/ ??	
5	2001	Gaël Le Cleac'h (FRA); Roland Jourdain (FRA)	Sill Plein Fruit	1999	16d 13h 23m	/ ??	
6	2003	Jean-Pierre Dick (FRA); Nicolas Abiven (FRA)	Virbac (1)	2003	17d 15h 18m 05s	10,87 / ??	
7	2005	Jean-Pierre Dick (FRA); Loïck Peyron (FRA)	Virbac (1)	2003	13d 09h 19m	13.51 / ??	
8	2007	Michel Desjoyeaux (FRA); Emmanuel Le Borgne (FRA)	Foncia (1)	2007			
9	2009	Marc Guillemot (FRA); Charles Caudrelier (FRA)	Safran (2)	2007		??	
10	2011	Jean-Pierre Dick (FRA); Jérémie Beyou (FRA)	Virbac Paprec 3	2010	15d 18h 13m 54s	12.50 / ?	??
11	2013	Vincent Riou (FRA); Jean Le Cam (FRA)	PRB (4)	2010	17d 00h 41m 47s	13.20 / 14.12	5772.3
12	2015	Vincent Riou (FRA); Sebastien Col (FRA)	PRB (4)	2010	17d 00h 22m 24s	13,22 / 14.78	6034.1
13	2017	Jean-Pierre Dick (FRA); Yann Eliès (FRA)	St Michel – Virbac	2015	13d 07h 36m 46s	13,61 / 14.56	4,652
14	2019	Charlie Dalin (FRA); Yann Eliès (FRA)	Apivia	2019	13d 12h 08m	13.42 / 15.65	5,061.85
15	2021	Thomas Ruyant (FRA); Morgan Lagravière (FRA)	Linked Out	2019	18d 01h 21m 10s	13.38 / 15.44	6691.3
16	2023	Thomas Ruyant (FRA); Morgan Lagraviere (FRA)	For People	2023	11d 21h 32m 31s	13.13 / 19.00	5425
17	2025	Jérémie Beyou (FRA); Morgan Lagraviere (FRA)	Charal	2022	11 d 19 h 45 m		

=== Class 40 - Winners ===
Event		Winning Boat				Winning Crew	Time			Ref.
Ed	Year	S/N	Boat name	Design	Year Launched	Winning Crew	Elapsed Time	Speed (Rhum/Water)	Distance	Ref.
8	2007	55	Télécom Italia	Tyker 40 Evo.2	2007	Giovanni Soldini (ITA); Pietro D'Ali (ITA)	22d 13h 02m 22s			
10	2011	FRA 98	Aquarelle.com	Tyker 40 Evo.2	2010	Yannick Bestaven (FRA); Eric Drouglazet (FRA)	21d 17h 59m 08s	9.06 / ??		
11	2013	FRA 130	GDF Suez	Mach 40	2013	Sebastien Rogues (FRA); Fabien Delahaye (FRA)	20d 21h 41m 25s	10.75 / 11.12	5578.7	
12	2015	142	Le Conservateur	TIZH 40	2014	Yannick Bestaven (FRA); Pierre Brasseur (FRA)	24d 08h 10m 09s	9.24 / 10.21	5962.6	
13	2017	144	V&B	Mach 40.3	2015	Maxime Sorel (FRA); Antoine Carpentier (FRA)	17d 10h 44m 15s	10.40 / 10.77		
14	2019	158	Crédit Mutuel	Max 40	2019	Ian Lipinski (FRA); Adrien Hardy (FRA)	17d 16h 21m 23s	10.25 / 11.11	4714.35	
15	2021	161	Redman	Mach 40.4	2020	Antoine Carpentier (FRA); Pablo Santurde Del Arco (ESP)	21d 22h 33m 30s	8.74 / ?		
16	2023	ITA 181	Alla Grande PIRELLI	Musa 40	2022	Ambrogio Beccaria (ITA); Nico Andrieu (FRA)	18d 12h 21m 55s	9.10 / 12.11	5381.51	
17	2025									

== 1993 1st Edition ==
The first edition was a single handed race between Le Havre and Cartagena (Colombia). 13 boats started.

- 1st multihull: Paul Vatine on Région Haute-Normandie.
- 1st monohull: Yves Parlier on Cacolac d'Aquitaine.

=== ORMA 60 Multihulls ===
Pos.	Crew	Boat name	Year Launched	Elapsed Time
1	Paul Vatine (FRA)	Haute Normandie	1988	16d 00h 46m
2	Laurent Bourgnon (FRA)	Primagaz	1990	16d 08h 39m
3	Francis Joyon (FRA)	Banque Populaire	1985	17d 01h 26m
4	Hervé Laurent (FRA)	Buchy Vacances	1984	18d 23h 05m
5	Eric Dumont (FRA)	Casino d'Etretat	1990	23d 03h 38m

=== IMOCA 60 ===
Pos.	Crew	Boat name	Year Launched	Elapsed Time
1	Yves Parlier (FRA)	Cacolac d'Aquitaine	1990	18d 23h 38m
2	Alain Gautier (FRA)	Bagages Supérior	1992	20d 05h 51m
3	Loïck Peyron (FRA)	Fujicolor III	1992	20d 20h 45m
4	Jean-Luc Van Den Heede (FRA)	Citadines	1991	21d 11h 13m
5	Mike Birch (CAN)	Biscuits La Triniraine	1990	22d 19h 41m
6	Gerry Roufs (CAN)	Groupe LG	1989	23d 01h 39m
7	Vincent Riou (FRA)	Maître Coq		28d 13h
ABN	Marie Sergent (FRA)	Drapeau de la France	Abandoned	

== 1995 ==
A two-handed race between Le Havre and Cartagena.

- 1st multihull: Paul Vatine and Roland Jourdain on Région Haute-Normandie.
- 1st monohull: Jean Maurel and Fred Dahirel on Côte d'Or.

Classements Skippers Bateaux Temps de course

=== ORMA ===
Pos.	Crew	Launch Date	Boat name	Elapsed Time	Notes
1	Paul Vatine (FRA); Roland Jourdain (FRA)	1994	Région Haute Normandie	14d 12h 25m	
2	Francis Joyon (FRA); Jacques Vincent (FRA)	1994	Banque Populaire	14d 13h 01m	
3	Laurent Bourgnon (SUI); Cam Lewis (USA)	1990	Primagaz	14d 16h 12m	
4	Jean-Louis Miquel (FRA); Lalou Roucayrol (FRA)	1985	La Teste de Buch	19d 20h 17m	
5	Gwen Chapelain (FRA); Marc Guillemot (FRA)	1990	Groupe Larzul		Actually a Multi 50
ABN	Franck Proffit (FRA); Loïck Peyron (FRA)	1990	Fujicolor II		

=== IMOCA 60 ===
Pos.	Crew	Launch Date	Boat name	Elapsed Time
1	Fred Dahirel (FRA); Jean Maurel (FRA)	1992	Côtes d'Or	21d 08h 40m
2	Jean-Yves Hasselin (FRA); Hervé Besson (FRA)	1991	PRB Vendée	22d 12h 05m
3	Patrick de Radiguès (BEL); Yves Le Cornec (FRA)	1989	La Novia	22d 23h 47m
ABN	Jean-Louis Collet (FRA); Y.Costollec (FRA)	N/C	Claude Philippe Création	Abandon
ABN	Eric Dumont (FRA); G.Campan (FRA)	1990	Casino d'Etretat	Abandons

== 1997 ==
Again a two-handed race between Le Havre and Cartagena.

- 1st multihull: Laurent and his brother Yvan Bourgnon on Primagaz.
- 1st monohull: Yves Parlier and Éric Tabarly on Aquitaine Innovations.

=== 60ft Multihulls ===
Pos.	Crew	Launch Date	Boat name	Elapsed Time	Av Speed
1	Laurent Bourgnon (SUI); Yvan Bourgnon (SUI)	1990	Primagaz	14d 07h 37m	14.21
2	Jean-Luc Nélias (FRA); Paul Vatine (FRA)	1994	Chauss' Europ	15d 10h 11m	13.11
3	Franck Proffit (FRA); Loïck Peyron (FRA)	1990	Fujicolor II	15d 16h 45m	12.88
4	Francis Joyon (FRA); Roland Jourdain (FRA)	1994	Banque Populaire	16d 01h 08m	12.6
5	Marc Guillemot (FRA); Sidney Gavignet (FRA)	1988	Biscuits La Trinitaine	29d 17h 15m	6.17
ABN	François-René Carluer (FRA); Patrick Tabarly (FRA)	1988	Laiterie de Saint-Malo	Abandon	

=== IMOCA 60 ===
Pos.	Crew	Launch Date	Boat name	Elapsed Time	Av Speed
1	Eric Tabarly (FRA); Yves Parlier (FRA)	1996	Aquitaine Innovations	19d 23h 19m	9.18
2	Marc Thiercelin (FRA); Dominique Wavre (FRA)	1990	Somewhere	21d 02h 49m	8.68
3	Fred Dahirel (FRA); Jean Maurel (FRA)	1992	Saupiquet	22d 07h 40m	8.22
4	Albert Bargués (ESP); Nándor Fa (HUN)	1996	Budapest	23d 07h 12m	7.87
ABN	Eric Denamiel (FRA); Eric Dumont (FRA)	1991	Café Legal	Lost Mast	
ABN	Patrick de Radiguès (BEL); Bernard Gallay (BEL)	1989	Catalogue Afibel	Damage	
ABN	B. Hooke (GBR); Josh Hall (GBR)	1992	Gartmore Investisment	Abandon	
ABN	B. Samuel (FRA); Pierre-Yves Guennec (FRA)	N/C	Tremblay en France	Abandon	
AB	N. Vaughan; Arnet Taylor		Albright Star (C2)		

=== 50ft Multi ===
Pos.	Crew	Launch Date	Boat name
ABN	Hervé Cleris (FRA); Ronan Delacou (FRA)	1990	Climat de France
ABN	Pascal Quintin (FRA); Raphaël Sohier (FRA)	1997	Rendez-Vous Nature

=== 50ft Monohull ===
Pos.	Crew	Launch Date	Boat name	Elapsed Time	Av Speed
1	Raphaël Dinelli (FRA); Pete Goss (GBR)	1996	BMW Performances	24d 09h 41m	7.52
ABN	A. Taylor; N. Vaughan	1986	Albright Star		

== 1999 ==
This year was marked by the disappearance of Paul Vatine, on board the Groupe André.

- 1st multihull : Loïck Peyron and Franck Proffit on Fujicolor.
- 1st monohull : Thomas Coville and Hervé Jan on Sodebo.

=== Multihulls ===
Pos.	Crew	Launch Date	Boat name	Arrival Time	Elapsed Time	Ref.
1	Franck Proffit (FRA); Loïck Peyron (FRA)	1990	Fujicolor II	.05/11/1999 06:31:36	15d 02h 08m	
2	Franck Cammas (FRA); Steve Ravussin (SUI)	1998	Groupama	.05/11/1999 06:31:36	15d 17h 07m	
3	Laurent Bourgnon (SUI); Yvan Bourgnon (SUI)	1990	Foncia	.05/11/1999 06:31:36	15d 19h 26m	
4	Jacques Caraës (FRA); Lalou Roucayrol (FRA)	1994	Banque Populaire	.05/11/99 06:31:36	17d 21h 16m	
ABN	Alain Gautier (FRA); Michel Desjoyeaux (FRA)	1997	Brocéliande	Pitchpole/Capsized		
ABN	Jean-Luc Nélias (FRA); Marc Guillemot (FRA)	1998	Biscuits La Trinitaine	Board failures		
ABN	Jean Maurel (FRA); Paul Vatine (FRA)	1994	Groupe André	Pitchpole/Capsized sadly Paul lost his life		
ABN	Hervé Cléris (FRA); Ronan Delacou (FRA)		N/C			

=== IMOCA 60 ===
Pos.	Crew	Launch Date	Boat name	Arrival Time	Elapsed Time
1	Hervé Jan (FRA); Thomas Coville (FRA)	1998	Sodebo	.05/11/99 06:31:36	19d 17h 31m
2	Catherine Chabaud (FRA); Luc Bartissol (FRA)	1998	Whirlpool	.05/11/99 07:41:35	19d 18h 41m
3	Edward Danby (GBR); Mike Golding (GBR)	1997	Team Group 4	.05/11/99 08:03:51	19d 19h 03m
4	Jean Le Cam (FRA); Roland Jourdain (FRA)	1998	Sill Entreprise	.05/11/99 08:21:40	19d 19h 21m
5	Bernard Mallaret (FRA); Marc Thiercelin (FRA)	1998	Somewhere	.05/11/99 17:16:13	20d 04h 16m
6	Yves Parlier (FRA); Ellen MacArthur (GBR)	1996	Aquitaine Innovations	.06/11/99 18:25:09	21d 05h 25m
7	Alex Thomson (GBR); Josh Hall (GBR)	1998	Gartmore	.08/11/99 14:37:48	23d 01h 37m
ABN	Hervé Laurent (FRA); Loïc Etevenard (FRA)	N/C	Défi 14 PME		
ABN	Guido Broggi (ITA); Bruno Laurent (FRA)	1997	Fila		
ABN	Christian Gasperin (FRA); Xavier Lecoeur (FRA)	1990	Geb		

=== IMOCA 50 ===
Pos.	Crew	Boat name	Elapsed Time
1	Emma Richards (GBR)	Pindar	10/11/99 20:54:56
1	Miranda Merron (GBR)	Pindar	10/11/99 20:54:56
DNF	Franco Fineschi (BEL)	Spirit of Race	12/11/99 19:00:00
DNF	Michael Fineschi (BEL)	Spirit of Race	12/11/99 19:00:00

== 2001 ==
A two-handed race between Le Havre and Salvador de Bahia (Brazil). There was a total of 22 boats in 3 classes of boats.

- 1 out of 14 multihull 60: Franck Cammas and Steve Ravussin on Groupama.
- 1 out of 12 monohull 60: Roland Jourdain and Gaël Le Cléac'h on Sill Pleint Fruit.
- 1 out of 17 monohull 50: Alex Bennett and Paul Larsen on One Dream.

=== ORMA ===
ORMA 60 Class Results
Pos.	Crew	Boat name	Launch Date	Elapsed Time
1	Franck Cammas (FRA); Stève Ravussin (SUI)	Groupama 1	1998	14d 09h 03m
2	Alain Gautier (FRA); Ellen MacArthur (GBR)	Foncia	1997	14d 12h 35m
3	Loïc Le Mignon (FRA); Loïck Peyron (FRA)	Fujifilm	2001	14d 22h 11m
4	Jacques Caraes (FRA); Jean Le Cam (FRA)	Bonduelle	2000	15d 09h 31m
5	Jean-Luc Nélias (FRA); Michel Desjoyeaux (FRA)	Belgacom	2001	15d 15h et 28m
6	Lalou Roucayrol (FRA); Yves Parlier (FRA)	Banque Populaire III	2001	16d 02h 21m
7	Olivier Lozachmeur (FRA); Giovanni Soldini (ITA)	Fila	2001	17d 01h 50m
8	Yvan Bourgnon (SUI); Yvan Ravussin (SUI)	Nautica	1990	19d 15h et 19m
9	Emma Richards (GBR); Mikaela Von Koskull (FIN)	Pindar	1990	21d 22h et 29m
RET	Bertrand de Broc (FRA); Pascal Bidégorry (FRA)	Banque Covefii	1990	Abandon à la suite d'un problème électrique
RET	Karine Fauconnier (FRA); Franck Proffit (FRA)	Sergio Tacchini	2001	Abandon à la suite de multiples avaries
RET	Marc Guillemot (FRA); Yann Guichard (FRA)	Biscuits La Trinitaine	1998	Abandon à la suite d'une fissure dans la coque
RET	François Denis (FRA); Thierry Duprey (FRA)	Gitana IX	1988	Abandon à la suite d'un problème de structure
RET	Francis Joyon (FRA); Thomas Coville (FRA)	Eure et Loir	1994	Abandon à la suite d'un problème d'étai

=== IMOCA 60 ===
IMOCA 60 Results
Pos.	Crew	Boat name	Launch Date	Elapsed Time
1	Gaël Le Cleac'h (FRA); Roland Jourdain (FRA)	Sill Plein Fruit	1998	16d 13h 23m
2	Marcus Hutchinson (IRL); Mike Golding (GBR)	Ecover (1)	1998	16d 18h 40m
3	Mark Turner (GBR); Nick Moloney (AUS)	Casto-Darty-But	2000	16d 20h 10m
4	Javier Sanso (ESP); Éric Dumont (FRA)	SME-Negoceane	1998	17d 01h 23m
5	Bernard Gallay (FRA); Kito de Pavant (FRA)	Voila.fr	1994	17d 03h 23m
6	Massimo Rufini (ITA); Bruno Laurent (FRA)	Fila	1997	17d 04h 12m
7	Michèle Paret (FRA); Dominique Wavre (SUI)	Téménos	1999	17d 5h 30 m
8	Vincent Riou (FRA); Bernard Stamm (SUI)	Bobst Group/Armor Lux	1999	17d 16h 55m
9	Frédérique Brulé (FRA); Miranda Merron (GBR)	Un Univers de Services	1992	18d 07h 39m
10	Éric Drouglazet (FRA); Joe Seeten (FRA)	Sollac Atlantique	1998	18d 08h 25m
11	Robert Wingate (GBR); Richard Tolkien (GBR)	This Times	1992	18d 13h 12m
RET	Loïc Pochet (FRA); Patrick Tabarly (FRA)	La rage de vivre	1997	Abandon

=== Classe 2 ===
Pos.	Crew	Boat name	Year Launched	Elapsed Time
1	Alex Bennett (GBR); Paul Larsen (AUS)	One Dream One Mission	1996	18d 16h 34m
2	Renaud Le Youdec (FRA); Jean Bacave (FRA)	Saving	2000	18d 23h 9m
3	Eric Denamiel (FRA); Jean-Pierre Amblard (FRA)	Setrabio	1996	21d h 42m
4	Henriette Lemay (FRA); Roger Langevin (FRA)	Branec III	1993	23d 13h 51m
5	Alessio Stefani (ITA); Simon Accati (ITA)	Tredici	2000	23d 16h 07m
6	Asia Pajowska (POL); Marc Taylor (GBR)	Olympian Challenger	1986	26d 11h 07m
RET	Christian Mace (FRA); Bob Escoffier (FRA)	Adecco–Étoile Horizon	2011	Abandon

== 2003 ==
From this year there have been 4 categories of boats and 38 competitors.

- 1st multihull 60 : Franck Cammas (FRA) and Franck Proffit (FRA) on Groupama.
- 1st monohull 60 : Jean-Pierre Dick (FRA) and Nicolas Abiven (FRA) on Virbac. Ross.
- 1st multihull 50 : Ross Hobson (GBR) and Andy Newman]] (GBR) on Mollymawk.
- 1st monohull 50 : Conrad Humphreys (GBR) and Paul Larsen (AUS) on Hellomoto.

=== 60ft Multihulls ===
Pos.	Crew	Boat name	Elapsed Time	Av Speed
1	Franck Cammas (FRA); Franck Proffit (FRA)	GROUPAMA	11d 23h 10m 41s	16,49
2	Jean-Luc Nélias (FRA); Loïck Peyron (FRA)	BELGACOM	12d 00h 22m 42s	16,42
3	Karine Fauconnier (FRA); Damian Foxall (IRL)	SERGIO TACCHINI	12d 03h 20m 28s	16,23
4	Michel Desjoyeaux (FRA); Hervé Jan (FRA)	GEANT	12d 06h 27m 31s	16,05
5	Marc Guillemot (FRA); Yann Guichard (FRA)	BISCUITS LA TRINITAINE	12d 08h 11m 55s	15,94
6	Lalou Roucayrol (FRA); Pascal Bidégorry (FRA)	BANQUE POPULAIRE	12d 09h 27m 44s	15,87
7	Thomas Coville (FRA); Jacques Vincent (FRA)	SODEBO	12d 11h 20m 15s	15,76
8	Lionel Lemonchois (FRA); M. Guessard (FRA)	GITANA	12d 19h 50m 45s	15,29
9	Alain Gautier (FRA); Ellen MacArthur (GBR)	FONCIA	12d 20h 38m 06s	15,25
10	P. Monnet (FRA); Laurent Bourgnon (FRA)	SOPRA GROUP	12d 20h 55m 50s	15,23
11	Jean Le Cam (FRA); Kito de Pavant (FRA)	BONDUELLE	13d 02h 00m 21s	14,97
12	Fred Le Peutrec (FRA); J. Cressant (FRA)	BAYER CROPSCIENCE	13d 12h 31m 02s	14,44
13	Stève Ravussin (SUI); Yvan Ravussin (SUI)	BANQUE COVEFI	13d 19h 04m 00s	14,13
ABD	Giovanni Soldini (ITA); Vittorio Malingri (ITA)	TIM		

=== IMOCA 60 ===
Pos.	Crew	Year Launched	Boat name	Elapsed Time	Av Speed
1	Jean-Pierre Dick (FRA); Nicolas Abiven (FRA)	2003	Virbac	17d 15h 18m 05s	10,87
2	Roland Jourdain (FRA); Alex Thomson (GBR)		Sill	17d 22h 09m 11s	10,69
3	Mike Golding (GBR); Brian Thompson (GBR)	2003	Ecover 2	17d 22h 28m 37s	10,68
4	Vincent Riou (FRA); Jérémie Beyou (FRA)	1999	PRB	18d 08h 16m 44s	10,43
5	Sébastien Josse (FRA); Isabelle Autissier (FRA)	1999	VMI	18d 17h 12m 42s	10,21
6	Nick Moloney (AUS); Samantha Davies (GBR)	2000	Team Cowes	18d 19h 57m 35s	10,14
7	Dominique Wavre (SUI); Michèle Paret (FRA)		Carrefour Prévention	19d 12h 54m 40s	9,75
8	Joé Seeten (FRA); Éric Dumont (FRA)	1990	Arcelor	21d 04h 00m 14s	8,97
9	Antoine Koch (FRA); François Robert (FRA)		Loire Atlantique	21d 20h 37m 21s	8,67
10	Patrick de Radiguès (BEL); Hans Bouscholte (BEL)		Garnier Belgium	22d 01h 32m 55s	8,58
11	Didier Munduteguy (FRA); Juan-Mari Odriozola (FRA)		60ème Sud	23d 22h 00m 12s	7,89
12	Bob Escoffier (FRA); Servane Escoffier (FRA)		Adecco	24d 00h 34m 15s	7,85
H.T	Mike Birch (CAN); Robert Birch (CAN)		TIR GROUPE		
ABN	Christophe Lebas (FRA); Bernard Stamm (SUI)		CHEMINEES POUJOULAT-ARMOR LUX		
ABN	Emma Richards (GBR); Mike Sanderson (AUS)	2001	PINDAR		
ABN	Charles Heidrich (FRA); Javier Sanso (ESP)	1998	OBJECTIF 3		
ABN	G. Leblanc (FRA); M. Nadeau (FRA)	1992	CIMENT ST-LAURENT OCEAN		

=== 50ft Multihulls ===
Pos.	Crew	Boat name	Elapsed Time	Av Speed
H.T.	R. Hobson (GBR); A. Newman (GBR)	MOLLYMAWK	27d 15h 58m 00s	6,85
ABD	A. Caseneuve (FRA); C. Houdet (FRA)	ATLANTIC NATURE		

=== 50ft Monohulls ===
Pos.	Crew	Boat name	Elapsed Time	Av Speed
1	Conrad Humphreys (GBR); Paul Larsen (AUS)	HELLOMOTO	22d 06h 21m 20s	8,50
H.T.	J.F Durand (FRA); S. Chemin (FRA)	DEFI VENDEEN	24d 18h 01m 15s	7,61
H.T.	R. Guillemot (FRA); O. Salnelle (FRA)	STORAGETEK	25d 21h 45m 25s	7,26
ABD	R. Diniz (FRA); M. Taylor (FRA)	LABESFAL		
ABD	R. Lanfevin (FRA); H. Lemay (FRA)	BRANEC III		

== 2005 ==
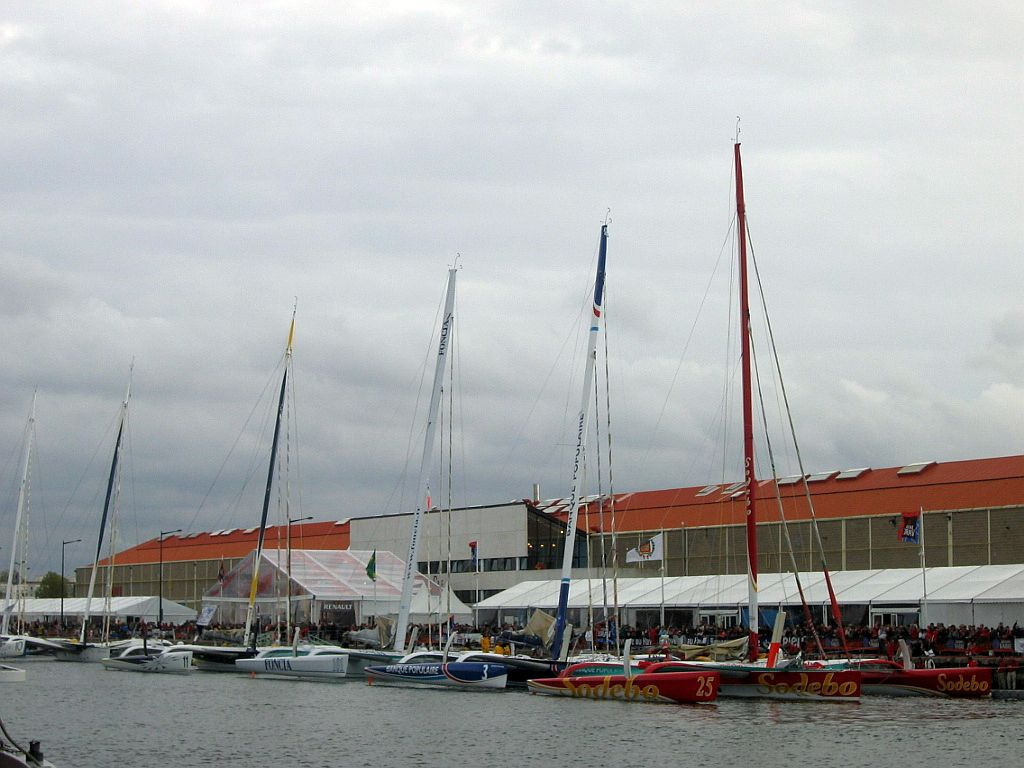
View of multihulls during the Transat Jacques Vabre, 6 November 2005, Le Havre

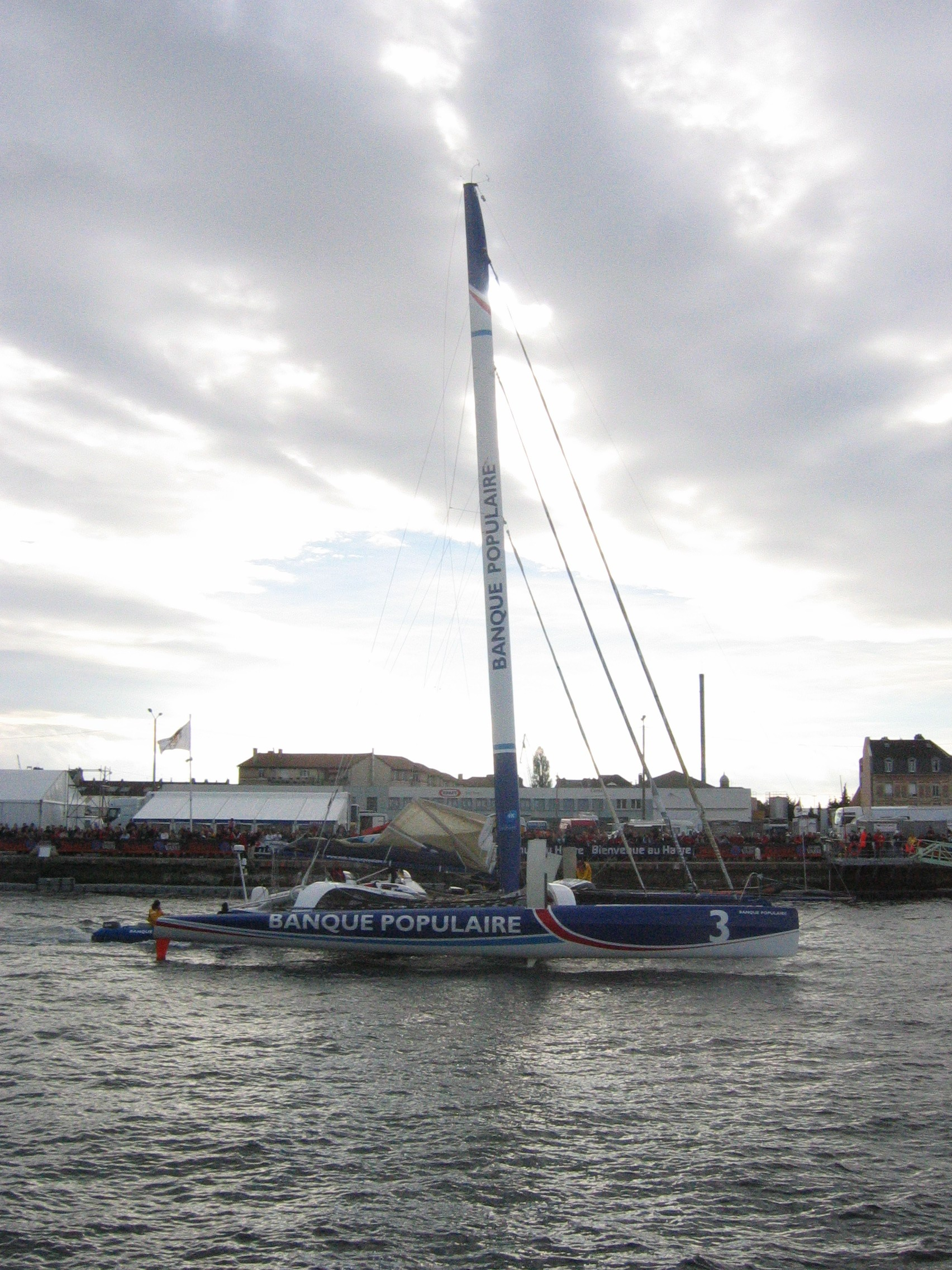
Banque populaire, the start day of the Transat Jacques Vabre, 6 November 2005

The start was 5 November for the monohulls and 6 November for the multihulls. 4,340 miles (6,980 km) (monohulls 50 and 60 feet) or 5,190 miles (8,350 km) to do this year. 34 boats were registered:

- 1st multihull 60 feet (class 1): Pascal Bidégorry and Lionel Lemonchois (France)
- 1st multihull 50 feet (class 2): Franck-Yves Escoffier and Kevin Escoffier on Crêpes Whaou
- 1st monohull 60 feet (class 1): Jean-Pierre Dick and Loïck Peyron on Virbac Paprec
- 1st monohull 50 feet (class 2): Joe Harris and Josh Hall on Gryphon Solo

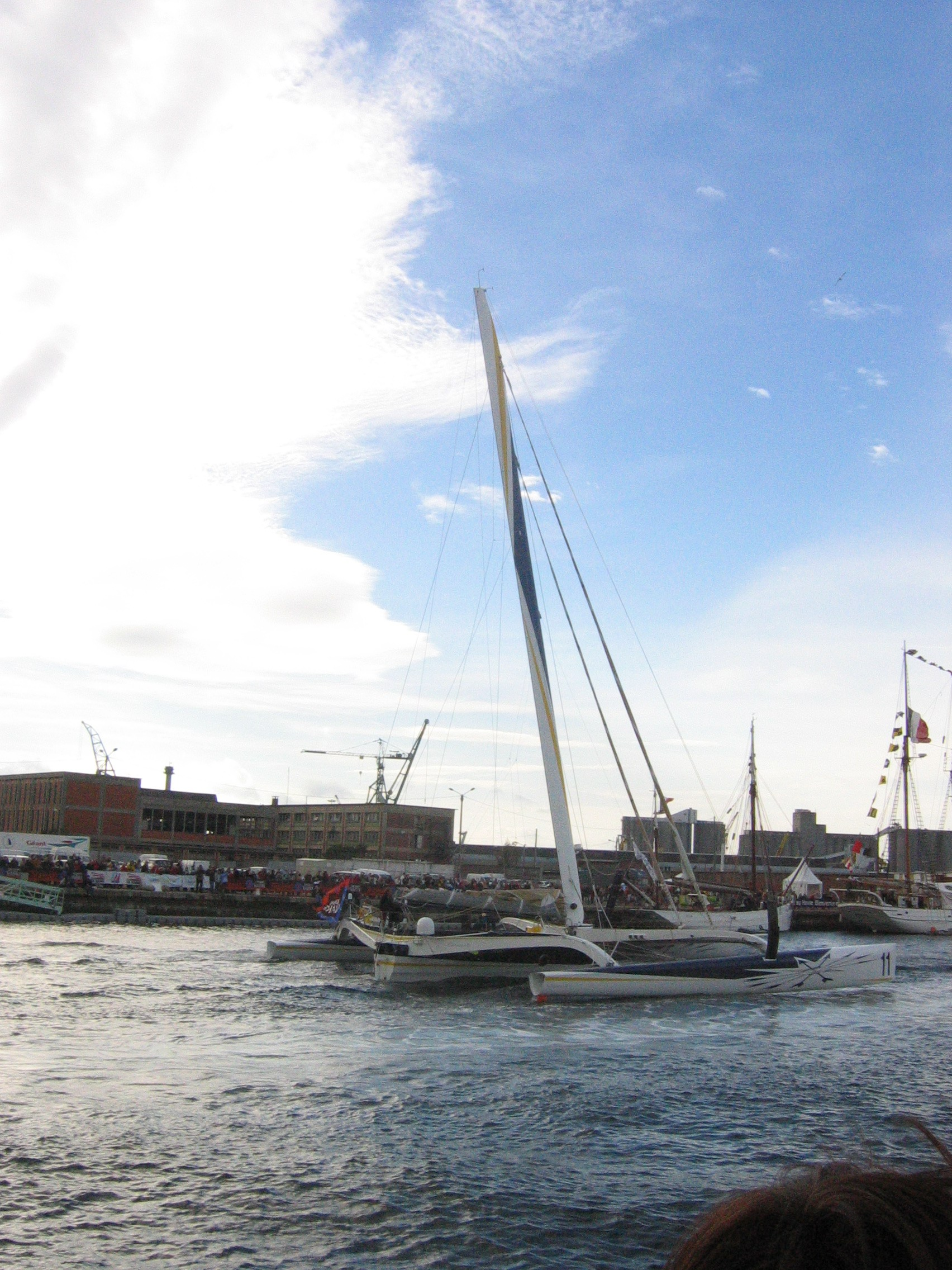
Gitana XI, Start day of the Transat Jacques Vabre, 6 November 2005

=== Multi 60 Orma ===
Pos.	Crew	Boat name	Elapsed Time	Av Speed	Notes	Ref.
1	Pascal Bidegoory & Lionel Lemonchois	Banque Populaire	14d 01h 46m 29s	15,37		
2	Fréderic Le Peutrec & Yann Guichard	Gitana 11	14d 04h 50m 15s	15,23		
3	Michel Desjoyeaux & Hugues Destremau	Géant	14d 05h 27m 44s	15,2	V	
4	Thierry Duprey du Vorsent & Erwan Le Roux	Gitana X	17d 11h 06m 33s	12,38		
ABD	Stève Ravussin & Yvan Ravussin	Orange Project	Capsized due to autopilot failure			
ABD	Giovanni Soldini & Vittorio Malingri	TIM Progetto Italia				
ABD	Yvan Bourgnon & Charles Caudrelier	Brossard				
ABD	Thomas Coville & Jacques Vincent	Sodebo	Dismasted			
ABD	Franck Cammas & Franck Proffit	Groupama 2				
ABD	Armel Le Cléac'h & Damian Foxall	Foncia	Capsized			

=== IMOCA 60 ===
Pos.	Crew	Boat name	Elapsed Time	Av Speed
1	Jean-Pierre Dick (FRA); Loïck Peyron (FRA)	Virbac-Paprec (1)	13d 09h 19m 02s	13,51
2	Roland Jourdain (FRA); Ellen MMacArthur (FRA)	Sill et Veolia	13d 09h 54m 03s	13,48
3	Jean Le Cam (FRA); Kito de Pavant (FRA)	Bonduelle (2)	13d 19h 29m 52s	13,09
4	Mike Golding (GBR); Dominique Wavre (SUI)	Ecover (2)	14d 00h 46m 25s	12,89
5	Brian Thompson (GBR); Will Oxley (AUS)	Skandia	14d 01h 14m 11s	12,87
6	Marc Thiercelin (FRA); Eric Drouglazet (FRA)	Pro-Form	14d 03h 54m 6s	12,77
7	Hervé Laurent (FRA); Laurent Massot (FRA)	UUDS	15d 20h 14m 22s	11,41
8	Anne Liardet (FRA); Miranda Merron (GBR)	Roxy	16d 07h 17m 42s	11,09
9	Joé Seeten (FRA); Cecilia Carreri (FRA)	Mare Verticale	17d 16h 16m 08s	10,23
10	Jean-Baptiste Dejeanty (FRA); Alexandre Toulorge (FRA)	Maisonneuve-Région Basse Normandie	19d 05h 20m 47s	9,41
11	Walter Antunes (FRA); Raphaël Coldefy (FRA)	Galileo	20d 04h 17m 31s	8,96
ABD	Bernard Stamm (SUI); Yann Eliès (FRA)	Cheminées Poujoulat (?)		

=== Multi Classe 2 ===
Pos.	Crew	Boat name	Elapsed Time	Av Speed
1	Franck-Yves Escoffier (FRA); Kevin Escoffier (FRA)	Crêpes Whaou !	12d 06h 13m 59s	14,75
2	Dominique Demachy (FRA); Philippe Langlois (FRA)	Gifi	20d 04h 08m 20s	8,96
3	Pascal Quintin (FRA); Raphaël Sohier (FRA)	Jean Stalaven	20d 05h 56m 24s	8,93
4	Dany Monnier (FRA); Pierre Dupuy (FRA)	VictorInox	21d 03h 26m	8,3
ABD	Roger Langevin (FRA); Henriette Lemay (FRA)	Négocéane-Donneurs de vie-Branec IV		
ABD	Anne Caseneuve (FRA); Christophe Houdet (FRA)	Acanthe Ingénierie		

=== Mono Classe 2 ===
Pos.	Crew	Boat name	Elapsed Time	Av Speed
1	Joe Harris (FRA); Josh Hall (FRA)	Gryphon Solo	19j 9h 5m 45s	9,33
2	Kip Stone (FRA); Merfyn Owen (FRA)	Artforms	20j 2h 46m 51s	8,99
3	Servane Escoffier (FRA); Bertrand de Broc (FRA)	Vedettes de Bréhat	20j 3h 52m 2s	8,97
4	Luc Coquelin (FRA); Chantal Foligné (FRA)	Top 50 Guadeloupe 23j 0h 18m 23s 7,86		
ABD	Paul Metcalf (FRA); Ryan Finn (FRA)	Polarity Solo		
ABD	Jean-François Durand (FRA); Karen Leibovici (FRA)	Défi Vendéen		
ABD	Bob Escoffier (FRA); Gérard Faye (FRA)	Adecco–Étoile Horizon		

== 2007 ==
The start was 3 November for the monohulls and 4 November for the multihulls from Le Havre. This year, 60 boats were registered.

- 1st multihull 60: Franck Cammas and Steve Ravussin on Groupama 2 in 10 days, 38 minutes and 43 seconds: Record of the Race
- 1st monohull 60: Michel Desjoyeaux and Emmanuel Le Borgne on Foncia in 17 days, 2 hours, 37 minutes and 5 seconds
- 1st multihull 50: Franck-Yves Escoffier and Karine Fauconnier on Crêpes Whaou in 15 days, 22 hours, 27 minutes and 37 seconds
- 1st monohull 40: Giovanni Soldini and Pietro d'Ali on Telecom Italia in 22 days, 13 hours, 2 minutes and 22 seconds

=== ORMA ===
Pos.	Crew	Boat name	Finish Time	Elapsed Time
1	Franck Cammas (FRA); Stève Ravussin (FRA)	Groupama 2	.14/11/2007 13:40:00	10d 00h 38 min
2	Lionel Lemonchois (FRA); Yann Guichard (FRA)	Gitana 11	.14/11/2007 22:51:00	10d 09h 49 min
3	Pascal Bidégorry (FRA); Yvan Ravussin (FRA)	Banque Populaire IV	.15/11/2007 05:59:00	10d 16h 57 min
4	Yvan Bourgnon (FRA); Jacques Vincent (FRA)	Brossard	.15/11/2007 14:17:00	11d 01h 15 min
5	Antoine Koch (FRA); Grégory Gendron (FRA)	Sopra	.16/11/2007 00:25:00	11d 11h 23 min

=== IMOCA 60 ===
Pos.	Crew	Year Launched	Boat name	Finish Time
1	Michel Desjoyeaux (FRA); Emmanuel Le Borgne (FRA)	2007	Foncia (1)	.20/11/2007 16:37
2	Marc Guillemot (FRA); Charles Caudrelier (FRA)	2007	Safran (2)	.20/11/2007 17:31
3	Bernard Stamm (SUI); Tanguy Cariou (FRA)		Cheminées Poujoulat (3)	.20/11/2007 19:19
4	Jean Le Cam (FRA); Gildas Morvan (FRA)		VM Matériaux (2)	.20/11/2007 21:50
5	Mike Golding (GBR); Bruno Dubois (FRA)	2007	Ecover III	.21/11/2007 06:09:00
6	Kito De Pavant (FRA); Sebastien Col (FRA)	2007	Groupe Bel	.21/11/2007 07:44:00
7	Armel Le Cléac'h (FRA); Nicolas Troussel (FRA)	2007	Brit Air	.21/11/2007 11:13:00
8	Loick Peyron (FRA); Jean-Baptiste Levaillant (FRA)	2007	Gitana Eighty	.21/11/2007 21:33:00
9	Yann Elies (FRA); Sebastien Audigane (FRA)	2007	Generali	.21/11/2007 21:40:00
10	Samantha Davies (GBR); Jeanne Grégoire (FRA)	1999	Roxy	.22/11/2007 11:56:00
11	Jean-Baptiste Dejeanty (FRA); Hervé Laurent (FRA)		Maisonneuve	.22/11/2007 20:02:00
12	Arnaud Boissières (FRA); Jean-Philippe Chomette (FRA)	1999	Akena Vérandas	.23/11/2007 12:16:00
13	Yannick Bestaven (FRA); Ronan Guérin (FRA)		Cervin EnR	.23/11/2007 13:36:00
14	Dee Caffari (GBR); Nigel King (GBR)	1998	Aviva 111	.23/11/2007 22:10:00
15	Unai Basurko (ESP); Gonzalo Gandarias (ESP)		Pakea Bizkaia 2009	.24/11/2007 21:46:00
16	Rich Wilson (USA); Michael Birch (CAN)	1999	Great American III	.26/11/2007 13:32:00
ABN	Jonny Malbon (GBR); Graham Tourell (GBR)		Artémis	

=== Multi 50 ===
Pos.	Crew	Boat name	Finish Time
1	Franck-Yves Escoffier (FRA); Karine Fauconnier (FRA)	Crêpes Whaou!	.20/11/2007 11:29:00
2	Victorien Erussard (FRA); Frédéric Dahirel (FRA)	Laiterie de Saint-Malo	.22/11/2007 04:02:00
3	Anne Caseneuve (FRA); Djamina Houdet (FRA)	Croisières Anne Caseneuve	.23/11/2007 23:02:00
4	Lalou Roucayrol (FRA); Pierre Van Den Broek (FRA)	NIM Intérim Management	.24/11/2007 01:35:00
5	Roger Langevin (FRA); Alexis Langevin (FRA)	Négoceane	.25/11/2007 15:58:00
6	Dany Monnier (FRA); Pierre Dupuis (FRA)	Victorinox	.26/11/2007 23:56:00
7	Hervé De Carlan (FRA); Nolwenn De Carlan (FRA)	DZ energy.com	.01/12/2007 16:00:00
ABN	Jean-François Lilti (FRA); Xavier Gosselin (FRA)	Avocet 50	

=== Class 40 ===
Pos.	Boat.				Crew	Elapsed Time	Delta	%	Rhum Knots	Water Knots	Ref.
Pos.	S/N	Boat name	Model	Age	Name	Elapsed Time	Delta	%	Rhum Knots	Water Knots	Ref.
1	ITA 55	Télécom Italia	Verdier	2007	Giovanni Soldini (ITA); Pietro D'Ali (ITA)	22d 13h 02m 22s			8.02		
2	23	ATAO Audio System	Akilaria	2006	Dominic Vittet (FRA); Thierry Chabagny (FRA)	22d 17h 49m 20s	0d 04h 47m 0-2	0.88	7.95	0	
3	29	Chocolats Monbana	Tyker 40	2006	Damien Grimont (FRA); Erwan Le Roux (FRA)	23d 01h 59m 40s	0d 12h 57m 18	2.39	7.83	0	
4	25	Appart City	Tyker	2006	Yvan Noblet (FRA); Patrick Morvan (FRA)	23d 02h 37m 04s	0d 13h 34m 42	2.51	7.83	0	
5	61	A.ST Groupe	LNM40	2007	Marc Emig (FRA); Bertrand De Broc (FRA)	23d 05h 52m 25s	0d 16h 50m 03	3.11	7.78	0	
6	60	Groupe Partouche	JPK40	2007	Christophe Coatnoan (FRA); Christophe Le Bas (FRA)	23d 09h 02m 56s	0d 20h 00m 34	3.7	7.74	0	
7	59	Vecteur Plus - Groupe Moniteur	Rogers	2007	Bruno Jourdren (FRA); Nicolas Pichelin (FRA)	23d 12h 57m 28s	0d 23h 55m 06	4.42	7.68	0	
8	FRA 30	Novedia Set Environnement	CMI / Rogers	2007	Tanguy De Lamotte (FRA); Nick Bubb (GBR)	23d 17h 38m 30s	1d 04h 36m 08	5.29	7.62	0	
9	9	Sidaction	Pogo 40S1	2006	Arnaud Aubry (FRA); Antoine Carpentier (FRA)	23d 20h 13m 05s	1d 07h 10m 43	5.76	7.58	0	
10	53	Mistral Loisirs - Elior	Akilaria	2007	Thierry Bouchard (FRA); Oliver Krauss (FRA)	23d 20h 14m 25s	1d 07h 12m 03	5.77	7.58	0	
11	42	Deep Blue	Akilaria RC1	2006	Florence Arthaud (FRA); Luc Poupon (FRA)	23d 20h 14m 45s	1d 07h 12m 23	5.77	7.58	0	
12	31	Thirard	LC40	2007	Pascal Doin (FRA); Eric Defert (FRA)	24d 00h 20m 14s	1d 11h 17m 52	6.52	7.53	0	
13	26	Siegena Aubi	Jumbo	2006	Marc Le Pesqueux (FRA); Felipe Cubillos (FRA)	24d 02h 42m 50s	1d 13h 40m 28	6.96	7.5	0	
14	37	40 Degrees	Jaz	2007	Peter Harding (GBR); Anne Liardet (FRA)	24d 02h 49m 16s	1d 13h 46m 54	6.98	7.5	0	
15	43	E Leclerc Ville La Grand	Akilaria RC1	2007	Jean-Michel Viant (FRA); Olivier Magre (FRA)	24d 02h 59m 26s	1d 13h 57m 04	7.01	7.5	0	
16	52	Clarke Offshore Racing	Rodgers	2007	Simon Clarke (GBR); David Lindsay (GBR)	24d 04h 33m 01s	1d 15h 30m 39	7.3	7.48	0	
17	32	Merci les amis!	LNM40	2006	Cecile Poujol (FRA); Rémi Beauvais (FRA)	24d 05h 41m 50s	1d 16h 39m 28	7.51	7.46	0	
18	44	En avant les enfants!	Akilaria RC1	2007	Yvon Berrehar (FRA); Gérald Bibot (FRA)	24d 06h 56m 02s	1d 17h 53m 40	7.74	7.45	0	
19	22	Pindar 40	Pogo 40S1	2006	Jo Royle (GBR); Alexia Barrier (FRA)	24d 10h 56m 08s	1d 21h 53m 46	8.48	7.39	0	
20	6	Nous Entreprenons	Pogo 40S1	2006	Jacques Fournier (FRA); André Jantet (FRA)	24d 23h 06m 56s	2d 10h 04m 34	10.73	7.24	0	
21	FRA 17	Jardin Bio - Prévoir	Nacira 40 Mk1	2006	Benoît Parnaudeau (FRA); Jean-Christophe Caso (FRA)	25d 01h 16m 58s	2d 12h 14m 36	11.13	7.22	0	
22	20	Commerce équitable	Pogo 40S1	2006	Jean-Edouard Criquioche (FRA); Louis Duc (FRA)	25d 01h 17m 25s	2d 12h 15m 03	11.14	7.22	0	
23	GBR 49	Concise	Akilaria	2007	Dan Gohl (FRA); Tom Gall (FRA)	25d 01h 19m 50s	2d 12h 17m 28	11.14	7.22	0	
24	45	EDF Energies Nouvelles	Akilaria RC1	2007	David Augeix (FRA); Nicolas Marchand (FRA)	25d 04h 36m 58s	2d 15h 34m 36	11.75	7.18	0	
25	FRA 10	Groupe Sefico	Pogo 40S1	2006	Lionel Regnier (FRA); Pierre Yves Cavan (FRA)	25d 11h 05m 25s	2d 22h 03m 03	12.95	7.1	0	
26	8	Merena	Jumbo	2006	Alexis Guillaume (FRA); Bernard Boon Falleur (FRA)	26d 04h 16m 44s	3d 15h 14m 22	16.12	6.91	0	
27	47	Grassi Bateaux	Akilaria	2007	Eric Galmard (FRA); Olivier Grassi (FRA)	26d 08h 13m 20s	3d 19h 10m 58	16.85	6.86	0	
28	41	Gonser Group	Akilaria RC1	2007	David Lefebvre (FRA); Florian Gonser (FRA)	28d 17h 00m 00s	6d 03h 57m 38	27.35	6.3	0	
ABN	38	Fujifilm	Owen CC40	2007	Alex Benett (GBR); Ifor Pedley (GBR)						
ABN	34	Ocean Warrior (Kazimir Partners)	Express 40	2007	Lenjohn Van Der Wel (NED); Peter Van Der Wel (NED)						

== 2009 ==
The start was 8 November and course was from Le Havre to Puerto Limon (Costa Rica). Winners Marc Guillemot and Charles Caudrelier on Safran (IMOCA).

Pos.	Crew	Boat name
1	Marc Guillemot (FRA); Charles Caudrelier (FRA)	Safran
2	Kito de Pavant (FRA); François Gabart (FRA)	Groupe Bel
3	Mike Golding (GBR); Javier Sansó (ESP)	Mike Golding Yacht Racing
4	Michel Desjoyeaux (FRA); Jérémie Beyou (FRA)	Foncia (1)
5	Alex Pella (ESP); Pepe Ribes (ESP)	W.Hotels
6	Roland Jourdain (FRA); Jean-Luc Nélias (FRA)	Veolia Environnement
7	Arnaud Boissières (FRA); Vincent Riou (FRA)	Akenas Verandas
8	Dee Caffari (GBR); Brian Thompson (GBR)	Aviva
9	Yves Parlier (FRA); Pachi Rivero (ESP)	1876
10	Samantha Davies (GBR); Sidney Gavignet (FRA)	Artemis (2)
Abandon	Armel Le Cléac'h (FRA); Nicolas Troussel (FRA)	Brit Air
Abandon	Sébastien Josse (FRA); Jean-François Cuzon (FRA)	BT
Abandon	Marc Thiercelin (FRA); Christopher Pratt (FRA)	DCNS
Abandon	Alex Thomson (GBR); Ross Daniel (GBR)	Hugo Boss 2

=== Multi50 ===
Pos.	Crew	Boat name	Notes	Ref.
1	Crêpes Whaou!	Franck-Yves Escoffier; Erwan Le Roux		
2	Guyader pour Urgence Climatique	Loïc Féquet et Victorien Erussard		
3	Région Aquitaine-Port Medoc	Lalou Roucayrol et Amaiur Alfaro		
4	Prince de Bretagne	Hervé Cléris et Christophe Dietch		
Abandon	Actual	Yves Le Blévec et Jean Le Cam	Capsized Yves evacated Le Cam arranged recovery of boat	
Abandon	Fenetrea-Cardinal	Alain Maignan et Nicole Harel		

== 2013 ==
Storm Force 10 winds in the English Channel caused the postponement of the start to 7 November. The race was won by the MOD 70 Edmond de Rothschild skippered by Sebastien Josse and Charles Caudrelier. First monohull was PRB skippered by Vincent Riou and Jean Le Cam.

== 2015 ==
The 2015 race departed on 25 October, with 42 registered boats.

- 1st ULTIM:
- 1st Multi 50:
- 1st IMOCA 60: Vincent Riou (FRA) and Sebastien Col (FRA) on PRB 4 in 17 days, 00 hours, 22 minutes and 24 seconds
- 1st Class 40:

== 2017 ==
- 1st ULTIM: Thomas Coville and Jean-Luc Nelias on Sodebo Ultim in 7 days, 22 hours, 7 minutes and 27 seconds: Record of the Race
- 1st IMOCA 60: Jean-Pierre Dick and Yann Elies on St Michel – Vibrac in 13 days, 7 hours, 36 minutes and 46 seconds
- 1st Multi 50: Lalou Roucayrol and Alex Pella on Arkema in 10 days, 19 hours, 14 minutes and 19 seconds
- 1st Class 40: Maxime Sorel and Antoine Carpentier on V and B in 17 days, 10 hours, 44 minutes and 15 seconds

== 2019 ==
The 2019 of the Transat Jacques Vabre was the 14th edition and was raced from Le Havre, France, to Salvador de Bahia, Brazil.

- 1st IMOCA 60 : Charlie Dalin (FRA) and Yann Eliès (FRA) on Apivia in 13 days, 12 hrs 8 minutes;
- 1st Multi50 : Gilles Lamiré (FRA) and Antoine Carpentier (FRA) on Groupe GCA – Mille et un sourires en 11 days, 16 hrs, 34 minutes et 41 secondes;
- 1st Class40 : Ian Lipinski (FRA) and Adrien Hardy (FRA) on Crédit Mutuel in 17 days, 16 hrs, 21 minutes et 23 secondes
