= IMOCA 60 Hexagon =

Sailboat

Development
- Designer: Owen Clarke Design
- Builder: Southern Ocean Marine (NZL)

Racing
- Class association: IMOCA 60

The IMOCA 60 class yacht Hexagon, NZL 8 was designed by Owen Clark Design and launched in 2001 after being made by Southern Ocean Marine in New Zealand. The boat was built for Graham Dalton (NZL) brother of Whitbread and America Cup fame Grant Dalton (NZL).

== Racing results ==
Pos	Year	Race	Class	Boat name	Skipper	Notes	Ref
Round the world races
DNF	2002	Around Alone Race	IMOCA 60	Hexagon	Graham Dalton (NZL)		
Transatlantic Races
DNF	2007	Transat Jacques Vabre	IMOCA 60	ARTEMIS, GBR 10	Graham Tourell (GBR); Jonny MALBRON		
6 / 12	2006	Route du Rhum	IMOCA 60	ARTEMIS, GBR 10	Brian Thompson (GBR)	13d 17h	
DNF	2004	The Transat	IMOCA 60	Pindar (1)	Mike Sanderson (NZL)	12d 23h 57m	
DNF	2003	Transat Jacques Vabre	IMOCA 60	Pindar (1)	Mike Sanderson (NZL); Emma Richards (GBR)		
Other Races
144 / 269	2021	Fastnet Race	IRC Overall	Rosalba, GBR 10	Richard Tolkien (GBR) +Crew	3d 15h 50m	
270 / 309	2009	Fastnet Race	IRC Overall	Rosalba, GBR 10	Crew	3d 04h 55m	
8 / 11	2009	Fastnet Race	IMOCA 60	Artemis The Profit Hunter	Crew	3j02h23'	
6 / 12	2007	Calais Round Britain Race	IMOCA 60	ARTEMIS OCEAN RACING	Brian Thompson (GBR)	10d 10h 53m	
1 / 28	2007	RORC Sevenstar Round Britain and Ireland		ARTEMIS OCEAN RACING	Jonny MALBON	7d 4h 29' 40"	
DNF	2005	Calais Round Britain Race	IMOCA 60	Pindar (1)	Emma Richards (GBR)		
5 / 13	2005	Fastnet Race	IMOCA 60	Pindar (1)	Mike Sanderson (NZL) + Crew		
