= 2017 Transat Jacques Vabre =

Yachting race between France and Brazil

The 13th edition of the Transat Jacques Vabre was held in 2017 and was raced from Le Havre, France, to Salvador de Bahia, Brazil. With all classes sailing the traditional 4350 Nautical Mile course.

== Ultim ==
Pos.	Crew	Boat name	Year	Date Finish	Elapsed Time	Notes
1	Thomas Coville (FRA); Jean-Luc Nélias (FRA)	Sodebo Ultim'	2014	13-Nov	7d 22h 07m 27s	22,92 / 24,94
2	Sébastien Josse (FRA); Thomas Rouxel (FRA)	Gitana 17	2017	13-Nov	7d 23h 55m 24s	22,70 / 25,21
ABN	Lionel Lemonchois (FRA); Bernard Stamm (SUI)	Maxi80 Prince de Bretagne	2012	Abandon on 16-Nov		

== IMOCA 60 ==
Pos.	Crew	Boat name	Boat Age	Date Finish	Elapsed Time
1	Jean-Pierre Dick (FRA); Yann Eliès (FRA)	St Michel – Virbac	2015	13d 07h 36m 46s	13,61 / --
2	Paul Meilhat (FRA); Gwénolé Gahinet (FRA)	SMA	2011	13d 13h 58m 03s	13,36 / 14,11
3	Morgan Lagravière (FRA); Éric Péron (FRA)	"Des Voiles et Vous !"	2015	14d 01h 31m 44s	12,91 / 13,96
4	Boris Herrmann (GER); Thomas Ruyant (FRA)	Malizia II	2015	14d 21h 31m 53s	12,18 / 13,44
5	Kito de Pavant (FRA); Yannick Bestaven (FRA)	Bastide Otio (2)	2006	15d 03h 59m 46s	11,97 / 12,76
6	Tanguy de Lamotte (FRA); Samantha Davies (GBR)	Initiatives-Cœur (3)	2010	15d 07h 40m 39s	11,85 / 12,90
7	Louis Burton (FRA); Servane Escoffier (FRA)	Bureau Vallée 2	2015	15d 16h 02m 58s	11,58 / 12,68
8	Isabelle Joschke (FRA); Pierre Brasseur (FRA)	Generali	2007	16h 00h 33m 01s	11,33 / 12,11
9	Alan Roura (SUI); Frédéric Denis (FRA)	La Fabrique (2)	2007	16h 02h 04m 16s	11,28 / 11,96
10	Yoann Richomme (FRA); Pierre Lacaze (FRA)	Vivo a Beira	2004	16d 05h 20m 21s	11,19 / 11,85
11	Arnaud Boissières (FRA); Manuel Cousin (FRA)	La Mie Câline – Artipôle	2007	16d 17h 07m 45s	10,86 / 11,52
12	Fabrice Amedeo (FRA); Giancarlo Pedote (ITA)	Newrest – Brioche Pasquier	2007	16h 21h 41m 16s	10,74 / 11,61
13	Romain Attanasio (FRA); Aurélien Ducroz (FRA)	Famille Mary – Etamine Du Lys	1998	17d 03h 42m 27s	10,58 / 11,09

== Multi 50 ==
Pos.	Crew	Boat Age	Boat name	Date Finish	Elapsed Time	Notes
1	Lalou Roucayrol (FRA); Alex Pella (ESP)	2013	Arkema	.16-Nov	10d 19h 14m 19s	16,81 / 18,02
2	Erwan Le Roux (FRA); Vincent Riou (FRA)	2009	Fenêtréa – Mix Buffet	.16-Nov	11d 02h 51m 23s	16,33 / 17,71
3	Armel Tripon (FRA); Vincent Barnaud (FRA)	2009	Réauté Chocolat	.17-Nov	11d 19h 44m 23s	15,35 / 16,66
4	Gilles Lamiré (FRA); Thierry Duprey Du Vorsent (FRA)	2008	La French Tech Rennes Saint-Malo	.19-Nov	13d 11h 12m 03s	13,48 / 14,79
ABN	Thierry Bouchard (FRA); Olivier Krauss (FRA)	2017	Ciela Village	Abandon on 13-Nov		
ABN	Eric Defert (FRA); Christopher Pratt (FRA)	2005	Drekan Groupe	Abandon le 8-Nov		

== Class 40 ==
Pos.	Crew	Boat name	Boat Age	Date Finish	Elapsed Time	Notes
1	Maxime Sorel (FRA); Antoine Carpentier (FRA)	144	V&B	.23-Nov	17d 10h 44m 15s	10,40 / 10,77
2	Aymeric Chappellier (FRA); Arthur Le Vaillant (FRA)	151	Aïna enfance et avenir	.23-Nov	17d 11h 01m 57s	10,39 / 10,79
3	Phil Sharp (United Kingdom); Pablo Santurde (ESP)	130	Imerys	.23-Nov	17d 15h 58m 41s	10,27 / 10,70
4	Bertrand Delesne (FRA); Justine Mettraux (SUI)	115	Teamwork 40	.23-Nov	18d 00h 47m 46s	10,06 / 10,40
5	Olivier Cardin (FRA); Cédric Château (FRA)	148	Région Normandie Junior Senior by Evernex	.23-Nov	18d 02h 41m 56s	10,02 / 10,38
6	Massimo Jurris (ITA); Pietro Luciani (ITA)	101	Colombre XL	.24-Nov	18d 16h 53m 53s	9,71 / 10,07
7	Tom Laperche (FRA); Christophe Bachmann (FRA)	152	Le Lion d'Or	.24-Nov	19d 01h 00m 04s	9,53 / 9,98
8	Sylvain Pontu (FRA); Christophe Rateau (FRA)	131	Gustave Roussy	.25-Nov	20d 09h 20m 46s	8,90 / 9,37
9	Catherine Pourre (FRA); Benoit Hochart (FRA)	145	Eärendil	.26-Nov	20d 16h 41m 18s	8,77 / 9,26
10	Olivier Roussey (FRA); Philippe Burger (FRA)	124	Gras Savoye Berger Simon Obportus	.26-Nov	20d 21h 33m 52s	8,68 / 8,93
11	Leonardo Chicourel (BRA); José Guilherme Caldas (ANG)	107	Mussulo 40 Team Angola Cables	.27-Nov	21d 22h 59m 49s	8,26 / 8,88
12	Marc Dubos (FRA); Jacques-Arnaud Seyrig (FRA)	81	Esprit Scout	.02-12	27d 00h 06m 27s	6,72 / 7,25
ABN	Andrea Fantini (ITA); Alberto Bona (ITA)	55	Enel Green Power	Abandon on 13-Nov		
