= 2011 Transat Jacques Vabre =

The 2011 Transat Jacques Vabre was the 10th edition and was raced from Le Havre, France, to Puerto Limon in Costa Rica for the second time.

== Course ==
For monohulls, Le Havre-Puerto Limon, Dominican Republic to starboard: 4,730 miles. For Multi50s, Le Havre-Puerto Limon via Saint-Barthélemy and Barbados: 5,323 miles.

Only 20 of the 35 starters finished the race.

=== IMOCA 60 ===
Pos.	Crew	Boat name	Sail No.	Launch Date	Elapsed Time	Av Speed	Notes	Ref.
1	Jean-Pierre Dick (FRA); Jérémie Beyou (FRA)	Virbac Paprec 3	FRA 06	2010-05-18	15d 18h 13m 54s	12.50		
2	Alex Thomson (GBR); Guillermo Altadill (ESP)	Hugo Boss 4	GBR 99	2007-06-26	16d 09h 00m 00s	12.03		
3	Armel Le Cléac'h (FRA); Christopher Pratt (FRA)	Banque Populaire VI	FRA 19	2010-09-20	16d 15h 00m 03s	11.85		
4	François Gabart (FRA); Sébastien Col (FRA)	MACIF	FRA 312	2011-08-16	16d 16h 50m 12s	11.80		
5	Kito de Pavant (FRA); Yann Regniau (FRA)	Groupe Bel	FRA 360	2007	16d 18h 04m 02s	11.76		
6	Marc Guillemot (FRA); Yann Eliès (FRA)	Safran 2	FRA 25	2007-08-06	16d 19h 27m 52s	11.72		
7	Louis Burton (FRA); Nelson Burton (FRA)	Bureau Vallée (1)	FRA 35	2006-07-26	17d 16h 45m 40s	11.14		
8	Dominique Wavre (SUI); Michèle Paret (FRA)	Mirabaud	SUI 9	2006-09-01	17d 19h 39m 26s	11.06		
9	Mike Golding (GBR); Bruno Dubois (BEL) (CAN)	Gamesa	GBR 3	2007-07-31	17d 21h 42m 10s	11.01		
DNF	Vincent Riou (FRA); Hugues Destremau (FRA)	PRB 4	FRA 85	2009-11-30	8 Nov – Abandon (bulkhead issues)			
DNF	Bernard Stamm (SUI); Jean-François Cuzon (FRA)	Cheminées Poujoulat	FRA 2012	2011-05-12	7 Nov – Abandoned (triggering of the distress beacon following a major leak)			
DNF	Marc Thiercelin (FRA); Luc Alphand (FRA)	DCNS 1000		2008-05-29	6 Nov – Abandoned problem with charging electrics			
DNF	Arnaud Boissières (FRA); Gérald Veniard (FRA)	Akena Vérandas			4 Nov – Abandon (Damage)			

=== Multi50 ===
Pos.	Crew	Boat name	Sail No.	Elapsed Time	Notes	Ref.
1	Yves Le Blevec (FRA); Samuel Manuard (FRA)	Actual	20 November 2011	17d 17h 07m 43s	12.52	
2	Loïc Fequet (FRA); Loic Escoffier (FRA)	Maitre Jacques	21 November 2011	18d 22h 10m 30s	11.72	
DNF	Lionel Lemonchois (FRA); Matthieu Souben (FRA)	Prince de Bretagne	4 November 2011 Abandon (crosse du bras de liaison cassée)			
DNF	Erwan Le Roux (FRA); Didier Le Vourch (FRA)	FenetreA – Cardinal	4 November 2011 Abandon (fissure de mât et voie d'eau)			
DNF	Franck-Yves Escoffier (FRA); Antoine Koch (FRA)	Crêpes Whaou!	4 November 2011 Abandon (Franck-Yves Escoffier blessé)			
DNF	Julien Mabit (FRA); Étienne Mabit (FRA)	Monopticien.com	3 November 2011 Abandon (pièce du safran central cassée)			
DNF	Aubin Houdet Caseneuve (FRA); Anne Caseneuve (FRA)	Naviguez Anne Caseneuve	Non autorisés à partir le 28 octobre 2011			

=== Class40 ===
Pos.	Crew	Boat name	Sail No.	Elapsed Time		Notes	Ref.
1	Yannick Bestaven (FRA); Eric Drouglazet (FRA)	Aquarelle.com	FRA 98	21d 17h 59m 08s	9.06		
2	Damien Seguin (FRA); Yoann Richomme (FRA)	eRDF – Des pieds et des mains	FRA 52	22d 03h 02m 00s	8.91		
3	Hannah Jenner (GBR); Jesse Naimark-Rowse (GBR)	40 Degrees	GBR 90	23d 04h 02m 04s	8.50		
4	Rune Aasberg (NOR); Simen Lovgren (NOR)	Solo	NOR 12212 (Yr.2008)	23d 10h 10m 24s	8.41		
5	Jacques Fournier (FRA); Jean-Christophe Caso (FRA)	Groupe Picoty	FRA 85	24d 22h 42m 40s	7.90		
6	Nicholas Halmos (USA); Hugh Piggin (NZL)	11th Hour Racing	USA60337 (Yr.2008)	25d 08h 02m 00s	7.78		
7	Stéphanie Alran (FRA); Jean-Edouard Criquioche (FRA)	Phoenix Europe Express	FRA 20	26d 02h 04m 00s	7.55		
8	Christophe Coatnoan (FRA); Étienne Laforgue (FRA)	Partouche	FRA 113	28d 16h 00m 00s	6.88		
DNF	Andrea Fantini (ITA); Tommaso Stella (ITA)	Hip Eco Blue	FRA 42	29d 01h 08m 00s	6.78		
DNF	Anna Maria Renken (GER); Jakica Jesih (SLO)	Gust Buster	FRA 93	14 November 2011 Abandon			
DNF	Eric Galmard (FRA); François Scheeck (FRA)	Avis Immobilier	FRA 47	9 November 2011 Abandon (rupture du boulon de quille)			
DNF	Ned Collier Wakefield (GBR); Sam Goodchild (GBR)	Concise 2	GBR 93	8 November 2011 Abandon (délaminage à l'avant de la coque)			
DNF	Tanguy de Lamotte (FRA); Éric Péron (FRA)	Initiatives – Alex Olivier	GBR 30	6 November 2011 Abandon (perte de quille)			
DNF	Stéphane Le Diraison (FRA); Thomas Ruyant (FRA)	Bureau Veritas – Dunkerque Plaisance	FRA 109	5 November 2011 Abandon (rupture de la sous-barbe)			
DNF	Éric Lecoq (FRA); Éric Defert (FRA)	Lecoq Cuisine	USA 46	3 November 2011 Abandon (douleurs au bas du dos d'Éric Lecoq)			
DNF	Thierry Bouchard (FRA); Gilles Berenger (FRA)	Comiris Pole Santé Elior2	FRA 83	3 November 2011 Abandon (cloison structurelle délaminée)			
