= 2015 Transat Jacques Vabre =

The 2015 edition of the Transat Jacques Vabre was the 12th edition the course was 5400 nautical miles from Le Havre in France, to Itajai in Brazil.

== Ultime ==
Pos.	Boat.			Crew	Elapsed Time	Delta	%	Rhum Knots	Distance Sailed	Water Knots	Ref.
Pos.	Name	Design	Age	Name	Elapsed Time	Delta	%	Rhum Knots	Distance Sailed	Water Knots	Ref.
1	Macif	100ft VPLP Tri	2015	François Gabart (FRA); Pascal Bidégorry (FRA)	12d 17h 29m 27s		0	17.68			
2	Sodebo Ultim'		2013	Thomas Coville (FRA); Jean-Luc Nélias (FRA)	13d 01h 17m 38s	0d 07h 48m 11	20.85	17.24		0	
ABN	Actual			Yves Le Blevec (FRA); Jean-Baptiste Le Vaillant (FRA)							
ABN	Prince de Bretagne			Lionel Lemonchois (FRA); Roland Jourdain (FRA)							

== Multi 50 ==
Pos.	Boat.			Crew	Elapsed Time	Delta	%	Rhum Knots	Distance Sailed	Water Knots	Ref.
Pos.	S/N	Boat name	Age	Name	Elapsed Time	Delta	%	Rhum Knots	Distance Sailed	Water Knots	Ref.
1	3	FenêtréA Prysmian	2009	Erwan Le Roux (FRA); Giancarlo Pedote (ITA)	16d 22h 29m 13s			13.28			
2	83	Ciela Village (1)	2005	Thierry Bouchard (FRA); Olivier Krauss (FRA)	17d 17h 44m 51s	0d 19h 15m 38	4.74	12.68			
3	9	Arkema – Région Aquitaine	2013	Lalou Roucayrol (FRA); César Dohy (FRA)	20d 22h 47m 55s	4d 00h 18m 42	23.69	10.74	6337	12.60	
ABN	35	La French Tech Rennes Saint-Malo	2009	Gilles Lamiré (FRA); Yvan Bourgnon (SUI)	Collided with a container						

== IMOCA 60 ==
Pos.	Boat.		Crew	Elapsed Time	Delta	%	Rhum Knots	Distance Sailed	Water Knots	Ref.
Pos.	Boat name	Age	Crew	Elapsed Time	Delta	%	Rhum Knots	Distance Sailed	Water Knots	Ref.
1	PRB (4)	2010	Vincent Riou (FRA); Sebastien Col (FRA)	17d 00h 22m 24s	d 0h 0m 0	0	13.22		0	
2	Banque populaire VIII	2015	Armel Le Cléac'H (FRA); Erwan Tabarly (FRA)	17d 08h 29m 09s	0d 08h 06m 45	1.99	12.97		0	
3	Queguiner - Leucémie Espoir	2007	Yann Elies (FRA); Charlie Dalin (FRA)	17d 10h 01m 23s	0d 09h 38m 59	2.36	12.92		0	
4	Le souffle du Nord	2007	Thomas Ruyant (FRA); Adrien Hardy (FRA)	18d 01h 27m 45s	1d 01h 05m 21	6.14	12.46		0	
5	Initiatives Cœur	2006	Tanguy De Lamotte (FRA); Sam Davies (GBR)	18d 07h 09m 14s	1d 06h 46m 50	7.54	12.3		0	
6	MACSF	2007	Bertrand De Broc (FRA); Marc Guillemot (FRA)	18d 22h 10m 05s	1d 21h 47m 41	11.21	11.89		0	
7	Comme un seul homme	2008	Éric Bellion (FRA); Sam Goodchild (GBR)	19d 02h 15m 34s	2d 01h 53m 10	12.22	11.78		0	
8	Newrest - Matmut	2007	Fabrice Amédéo (FRA); Éric Péron (FRA)	19d 05h 07m 56s	2d 04h 45m 32	12.92	11.71		0	
9	Bureau Vallée	2006	Louis Burton (FRA); Romain Attanasio (FRA)	19d 05h 11m 33s	2d 04h 49m 09	12.93	11.71		0	
DNF	O Canada	2006	Eric Holden (CAN); Morgen Watson (CAN)	Abandon le 2 November (casse matérielle)						
DNF	StMichel-Virbac	2015	Jean-Pierre Dick (FRA); Fabien Delahaye (FRA)	Abandon le 1 November (problèmes de structure)						
DNF	Bastide-Otio (1)	2010	Kito de Pavant (FRA); Yann Régniau (FRA)	Abandon le 31 octobre (avaries multiples)						
DNF	Spirit of Hungary	2014	Nándor Fa (HUN); Péter Perényi (HUN)	Abandoned on 31 octobre (démâtage)						
DNF	Hugo Boss (6)	2015	Alex Thomson (GBR); Guillermo Altadill (ESP)	Abandoned on 31 octobre (problèmes de structure)						
DNF	SMA	2011	Paul Meilhat (FRA); Michel Desjoyeaux (FRA)	Abandon le 30 octobre (problème de quille)						
DNF	Adopteunskipper.net	2007	Nicolas Boidevezi (FRA); Ryan Breymaier (USA)	Abandon le 30 octobre (casse matérielle)						
DNF	Le bateau des métiers by Aérocampus	2007	Arnaud Boissières (FRA); Stan Maslard (FRA)	Abandon le 28 octobre (grand voile déchirée)						
DNF	Safran	2015	Morgan Lagravière (FRA); Nicolas Lunven (FRA)	Abandon le 28 octobre (voie d'eau)						
DNF	Edmond de Rothschild	2015	Sébastien Josse (FRA); Charles Caudrelier (FRA)	Abandon le 26 octobre (avaries multiples)						
DNF	Maitre Coq	2010	Jérémie Beyou (FRA); Philippe Legros (FRA)	Abandon le 26 octobre (casse matérielle)						

== Class 40 ==
Pos.	Boat.				Crew	Elapsed Time	Delta	%	Rhum Knots	Distance Sailed	Water Knots	Ref.
Pos.	S/N	Boat name	Model	Age	Name	Elapsed Time	Delta	%	Rhum Knots	Distance Sailed	Water Knots	Ref.
1	142	Le Conservateur	Tiz'h 40	2014	Yannick Bestaven (FRA); Pierre Brasseur (FRA)	24d 08h 10m 09s		0	7.45			
2	144	V and B	Mach 40.3	2015	Maxime Sorel (FRA); Sam Manuard (FRA)	24d 10h 04m 31s	0d 01h 54m 22	0.74	7.42			
3	65	Carac Advanced Energies	Akilaria Mk2 (Proto)	2008	Louis Duc (FRA); Christophe Lebas (FRA)	25d 21h 29m 52s	1d 13h 19m 43	14.4	7			
4	137	Solidaires en Peloton ARSEP	Mach 40	2014	Thibaut Vauchel-Camus (FRA); Victorien Erussard (FRA)	26d 09h 34m 00s	2d 01h 23m 51	19.05	6.87			
5	115	Teamwork 40	Mach 40	2012	Bertrand Delesne (FRA); Nils Palmieri (SUI)	26d 22h 25m 45s	2d 14h 15m 36	24.02	6.73			
6	130	Zetra	Mach 40	2013	Eduardo Penido (BRA); Renato Araujo (BRA)	28d 10h 37m 30s	4d 02h 27m 21	37.98	6.37			
7	30	Groupe Setin	CMI / Rogers	2007	Manuel Cousin (FRA); Gérald Quéouron (FRA)	28d 18h 08m 10s	4d 09h 58m 01	40.88	6.3			
8	124	SNBSM Espoir Compétition	Akilaria RC 3	2012	Valentin Lemarchand (FRA); Arthur Hubert (FRA)	28d 19h 14m 05s	4d 11h 03m 65	41.3	6.29			
9	93	Concise 2	Akilaria RC2	2010	Philippa Hutton-Squire (RSA); Pip Hare (GBR)	28d 19h 48m 20s	4d 11h 38m 11	41.52	6.29			
10	103	Club 103	Canivenc	0	Alan Roura (SUI); Juliette Petrès (FRA)	32d 22h 38m 35s	8d 14h 28m 26	79.65	5.5			
11	98	Creno Moustache Solidaire	Tyker 40 Evolution 2	2010	Thibault Hector (FRA); Morgan Launay (FRA)	33d 04h 13m 20s	8d 20h 03m 11	81.8	5.46			
ABN	145	Eärendil	Mach 40.3	2015	Catherine Pourre (FRA); Antoine Carpentier (FRA)	Abandoned on 30-Oct (Problem with Engine)						
ABN	125	Bretagne - Crédit Mutuel Elite	Custom Humphreys	2013	Nicolas Troussel (FRA); Corentin Horeau (FRA)	Abandoned on 28-Oct (auto pilot issues)						
ABN	129	Team Concise	McConaghy Ker40	2013	Jack Boutell (AUS); Gildas Mahé (FRA)	Abandoned on 28-Oct (Structural Problems)						
