= Miranda Merron =

British sailor (born 1969)

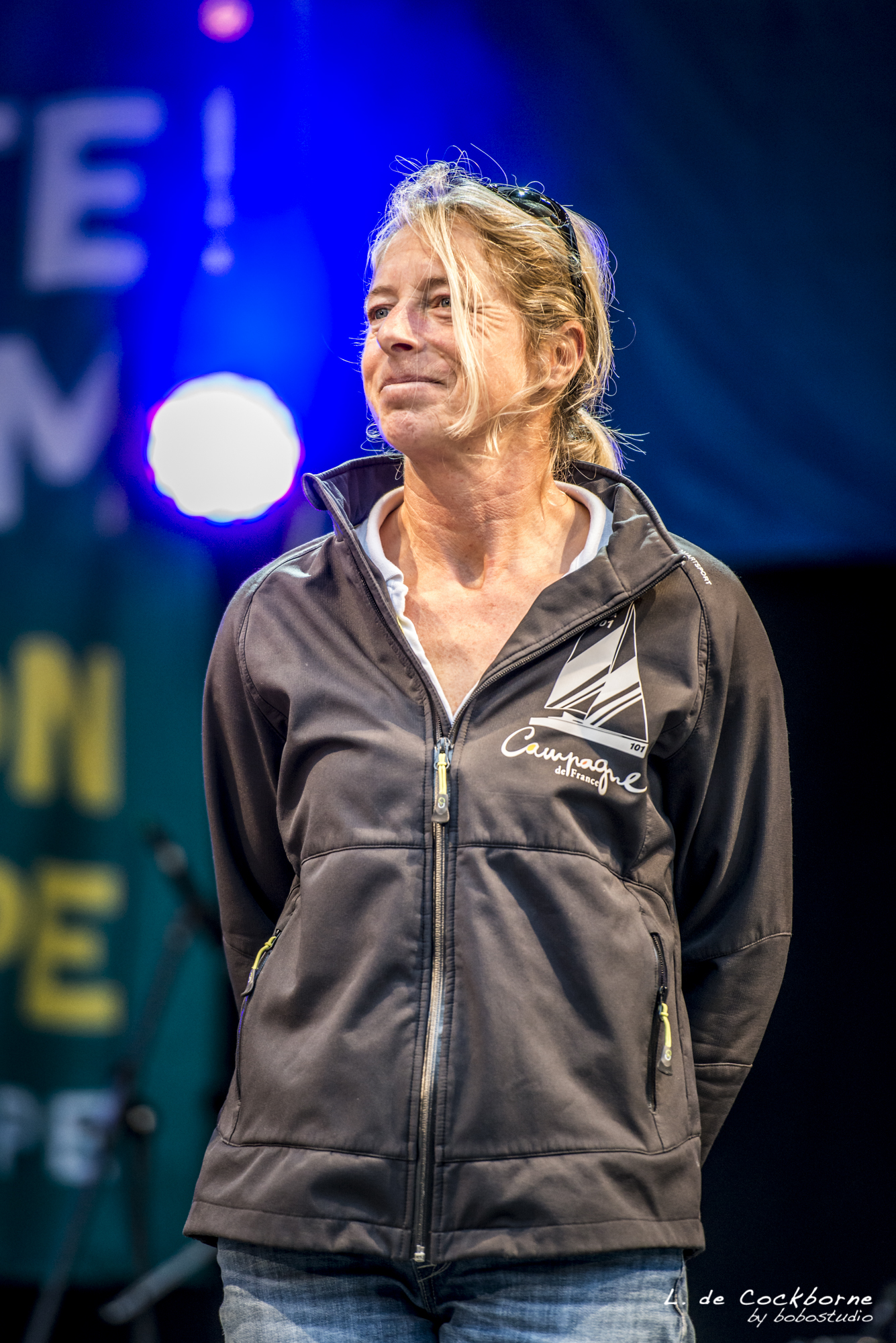

Personal information
- Nationality: British
- Born: 2 July 1969 (age 57)

Sailing career
- Sport: Sailing
- Classes: IMOCA 60; Class40

Miranda Merron is a British female sailor born on 2 July 1969. She is an offshore sailor having extensively competed with highlights including a Jules Verne Trophy attempt with Tracy Edwards on Royal Sunalliance and the completing the 2020–2021 Vendée Globe.

== Biography ==
Her family introduced her to sailing at an early age crewing for her father on his International 14 dinghy, at the age of nine she crossed the Atlantic with her father. Growing up, she studied (Oriental Studies/ Japanese) at Cambridge University and began her professional career in advertising all over the world.

With 12 years experience in the Class 40 with partner Halvard Mabire who was instrumental to her Vendee Globe dream as she originally intended todo a Class 40 round the world race. However the increased safety of a 60 ft boat and an organised race made here shift her goals.

Now she lives splits her time between Hamble le Rice in the Great Britain and France with her partner and fellow offshore sailor Halvard Mabire in Barneville-Carteret France.

== Race results ==
Year	Pos	Race	Class	Boat name	Notes	Ref.
Round the World Races
2022	22	2020-2021 Vendee Globe	IMOCA 60	Campaign de France	101d 8h 56m 51s	
2012	DNF	2011-12 Global Ocean Race	Class40	No. 101 - Campagne de France	with Mabire completed the first half of the race	
2001		2001-02 Volvo Ocean Race	Volvo Ocean 60	Nautor Challenge - Amer Sport Too	legs 4-9 from Auckland to Kiel as navigator	
1998	DNF	Jules Verne Trophy Attempt	Maxi Multi	Royal and Sunalliance	skipper by Tracy Edwards failed after being dismasted	
Trans Oceanic Races
2021		RORC Transatlantic Race	MOCRA	ORC50 - GDD	with Halvard Mabire	
2019	23	Transat Jacques-Vabre	IMOCA 60	Campaign de France	with Halvard Mabire	
2018	13	Route du Rhum	Class40	Campaign de France		
2017	DNF	Transat Jacques-Vabre 2013	Class40	No. 147 - Campagne de France	with Halvard Mabire	
2016	1	RORC Transatlantic Race	Class40			
2013	9	Transat Jacques-Vabre 2013	Class40	No. 101 - Campagne de France	with Halvard Mabire	
2012	1	Transat Québec-Saint-Malo	IMOCA 60	Campaign de France	with Halvard Mabire and Christian Bouroullec	
2005	8	Transat Jacques-Vabre 2005	IMOCA 60	Roxy (1)	19d 14h 24m with Anne Liardet	
2002	8	Route du Rhum	IMOCA 50	UUDS		
2001	9	Transat Jacques-Vabre 2001	IMOCA 60	A universe of services	with Frédérique Brulé	
2000	1	Single-Handed Trans-Atlantic Race	IMOCA 50	Pindar	with Emma Richards	
1999	1	Transat Jacques-Vabre 1999	IMOCA 50	Pindar	with Emma Richards	
Other Races
2020	17	Vendée-Arctic-Les Sables d'Olonne	IMOCA 60	Campaign de France		
2019	15	Rolex Fastnet Race	IMOCA 60	Campaign de France	with Halvard Mabire	
2019	13	Bermuda 1000 Race	Class40	Campaign de France		
2018	DNF	Seventar Round Britain & Ireland Race	Class40	No..147 - Campaign de France	with Pietro LUCIANI Rémi AUBRUN	
2017	3	Rolex Fastnet Race	Class40	No.147 - Campaign de France	with Halvard MABIRE, Rémi AUBRUN, Ronan DE KERSAUZON	
2009	WR	Crewed Monohull Round Britain and Ireland Record	N/A	IMOCA 60 - Aviva (2)	6d 11hrs 30min also an all female crew	
1997	3	Rolex Fastnet Race	Class40	No.37 - 40 Degrees	with Peter Harding	
