= Jean-Baptiste Dejeanty =

French offshore sailor and navigator

Personal information
- Nationality: French
- Born: 13 February 1978 (age 48) Paimpol in Brittany

Sailing career
- Sport: Sailing

Jean-Baptiste Dejeanty, born 13 February 1978 is a French professional sailor born in Paimpol in Brittany but now living in Port-Louis.

== Biography ==
He studied Naval Architecture at University of Southampton. In 2001, he opened his own construction site, Artech, and built a Mini 6.50 with which he took part in the Transat 6.50 in 2003. He then moved to the IMOCA class and in 2008 he was the youngest competitor to start the Vendée Globe in Maisonneuve - Lower Normandy Region although he retired due to structural failure. He tried to have a campaign for the 2012 edition but had funding issues caused by the sponsor not putting forwards the agreed funds.

== Key Results ==
Year	Pos.	Event	Class	Boat name	Notes	Ref.
2008	RET	2008-2009 Vendée Globe	60 foot	Maisonneuve		
2007	11/17	2007 Transat Jacques Vabre	IMOCA 60		with Hervé Laurent	
2005	10/12	2005 Transat Jacques Vabre	IMOCA 60		with Alexandre Toulorge	
2007	7/14	Rolex Fastnet Race	IMOCA 60			
2006	9/12	Route du Rhum	IMOCA 60			
2005	RET	Calais Round Britain and Ireland Race				
2004	25/31	Transat AG2R			with Barnabas Chivot	
2004	3	Mini-Fastnet	Mini Transat 6.50			
2003	RET	Transat 6.50	Mini Transat 6.50			
2003	4	Open semi-key 6.50	Mini Transat 6.50			
