= Richard Tolkien =

British sailor

Richard Ian Tolkien
Personal information
- Born: 9 January 1955 (age 71)

Sailing career
- Sport: Sailing
- Class: IMOCA 60

Richard Tolkien (born 9 January 1955) is a British corporate finance adviser, director and trustee and experienced adventure sailor who grew up in Devon. He was educated at King Edward VI School, Totnes, and Exeter College, Oxford (1974–1977), where he won the Webb Medley prize and graduated with a first in PPE. He joined HM Treasury that year and worked for the Chancellor of the Exchequer (Geoffrey Howe) in the private office from 1979 to 1982.

He started his corporate-finance work at Morgan, Grenfell & Co. in 1982, becoming a director of the bank in 1991. He was managing director at HSBC Investment Banking from 1997 to 2002 and an executive director of Macquarie from 2003. In 2006 he left the City to work as an independent expert witness in litigation and arbitration and a non–executive director, including at Share plc and Parkwood Holdings PLC. He was appointed chairman of the trustees of Stoke Mandeville Spinal Research in 2011, a post he still holds.

His corinthian sailing has included finishing sixth monohull in the 1992 RWYC OSTAR and winning with Robert Wingate the two-handed Round Britain Race on FPC Greenaway, a 40-foot trimaran, in 1998. This led to his taking on the ultimate challenge in offshore sailing, entering the 2000-2001 Vendee Globe, a single person round-the-world race; but he did not make it all the way around the world, as he was forced to retire on the 29th day of the race after suffering damage to his rig. He completed the 2001 Transat Jacques Vabre, placing 9th in the Imoca class, and the 2010 Route du Rhum in the Class 40 ICAP Orca.

He planned a return to the Vendee Globe at the age of 61 for the 2016 edition. However, on 13 May 2015, while he was competing in the Transat Bakerly Race, a qualifying event, a damaged sail caused him to suffer a head injury, forcing him to abandon his monohull, Sodebo. The Croatian cargo vessel Anton, which was heading for the United States, diverted to rescue him and evacuated him from the boat. The loss of the boat led to his not competing in the race. In 2022 he completed the RORC Transatlantic Race in Rosalba, an IMOCA 60, in 13 days. On 6 May 2022 Rosalba, skippered by Richard with three others aboard, established a new WSSRC record for a monohull from Bermuda to Plymouth of 12 days and 3 hours.
