= Robert Wingate =

British civil engineer (1832–1900)

Robert Wingate (1832–1900) was a British civil engineer who built railways in Canada, the Russian Empire, Austria-Hungary and Uruguay.

Wingate learned his trade under Alexander Ross on the Chester and Holyhead Railway and while working on the engineering staff of the Metropolitan Commission of Sewers. From 1853 he was engaged by Peto & Betts, initially designing the Grand Trunk Railway of Canada. In 1863 he moved to Russia (now Latvia) to work on the Dunaburg & Witepsk Railway (modern day Daugavpils). He then went on to work on the East Hungarian railway, followed, in 1871, by the Central Uruguay Railway. He stayed on in Uruguay in charge of maintenance and extension works.

From 1877 he was a member of the Institution of Civil Engineers. He returned to UK in 1899, and died on 18 June 1900, aged 67, at the Uruguay Railway office in Finsbury Circus, London.

He is buried in West Norwood Cemetery.
