= IMOCA 60 Sodebo =

Sailboat

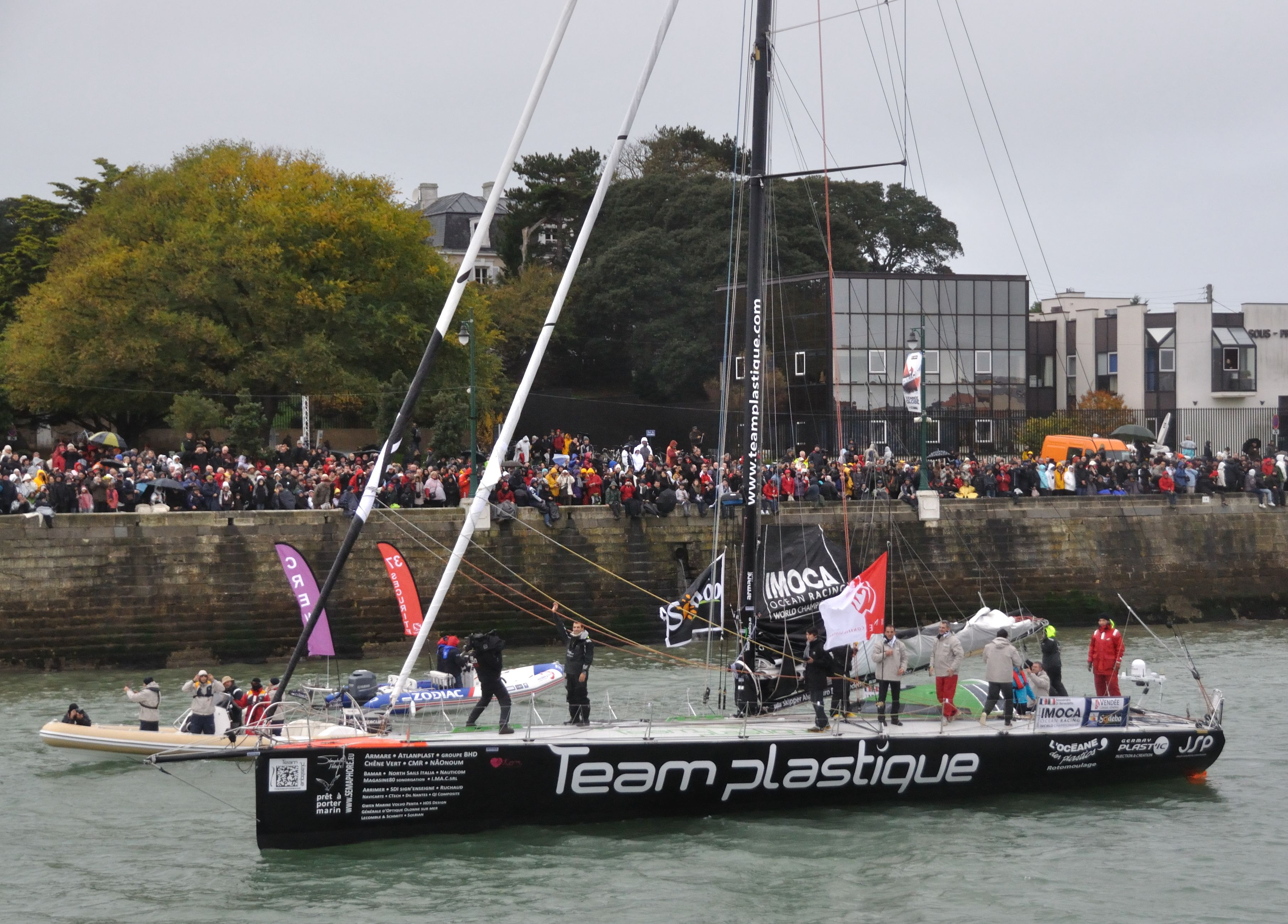

Development
- Designer: Finot-Conq
- Year: September 1998

Racing
- Class association: IMOCA 60

The IMOCA 60 class yacht SODEBO savourons la vie, 25 was designed by Finot-Conq and launched in October 1998, after being made by Kirié in France. The boat was lost in 2016 while on charter to Richard Tolkien when he abandoned ship after suffering an injury to the head. The wreckage was found near Porto Rico.

== Racing results ==
Pos	Year	Race	Class	Boat name	Skipper	Notes	Ref
Round the World Races
11 / 20	2013	2012–2013 Vendée Globe	IMOCA 60	Team Plastique	Alessandro Di Benedetto (ITA)	104d 02h 34m	
7 / 30	2009	2008–2009 Vendée Globe	IMOCA 60	AKENA VERANDAS, FRA 14	Arnaud Boissières (FRA)	93d 00h	.
5 / 20	2005	2004–2005 Vendée Globe	IMOCA 60	VMI	Sébastien Josse (FRA)	93j00h.	.
6 / 24	2001	2000–2001 Vendée Globe	IMOCA 60	Sodebo	Thomas Coville (FRA)		
Transatlantic Races
1	1999	Transat Jacques Vabre	IMOCA 60	Sodebo	Thomas Coville (FRA); Hervé Jan (GBR)	19d 23h 19m	
4 / 12	2006	Route du Rhum	IMOCA 60	Britair	Armel Le Cleach (FRA)	13j04h	
3	1999	Route du Rhum	IMOCA 60	Sodebo	Raphael Dinelli (FRA)	19d 10h	
Other Races
