= Charles Caudrelier =

French sailor

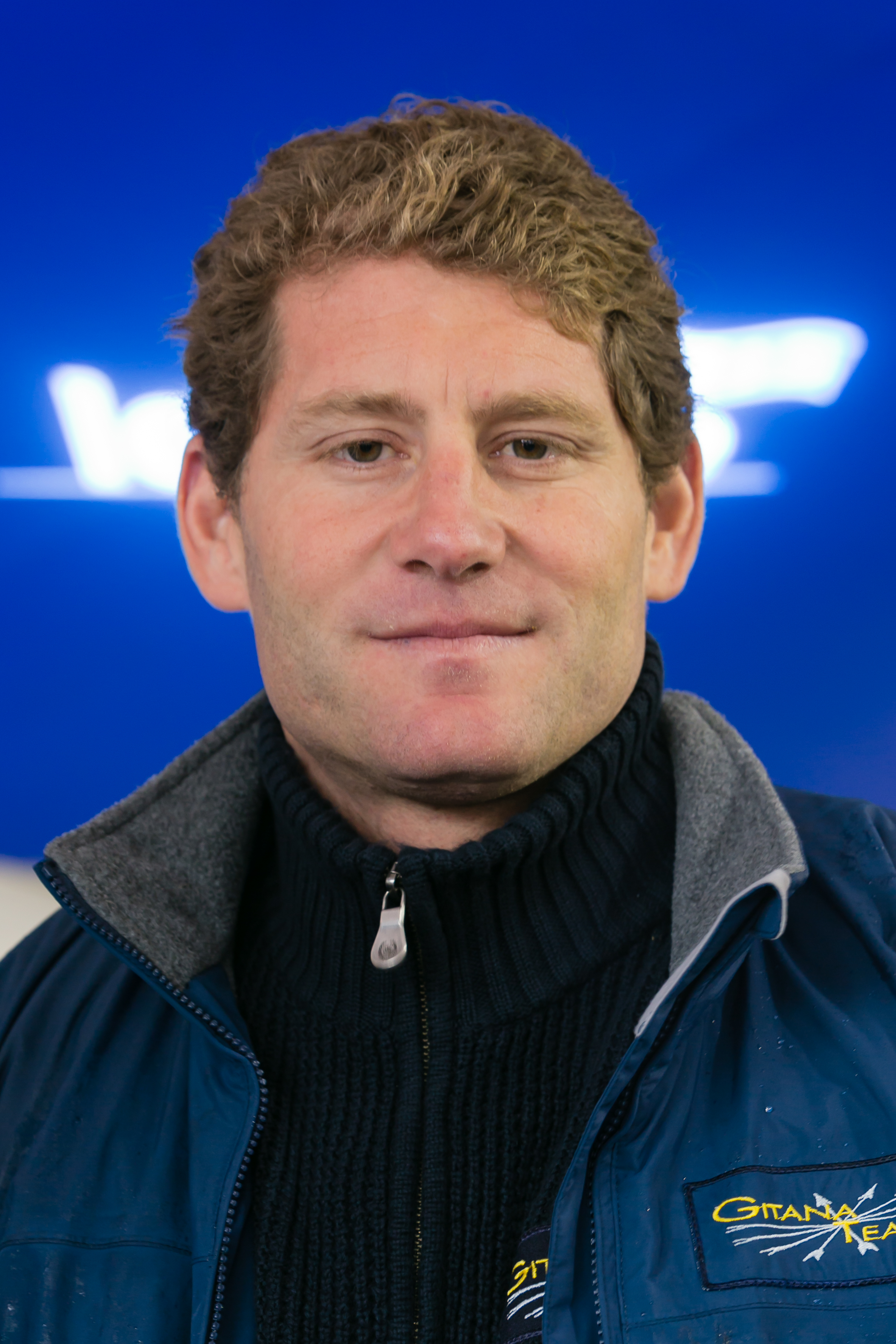

Personal information
- Full name: Charles Caudrelier Benac
- Born: 26 February 1974 (age 52) Paris, France

Charles Caudrelier (born 26 February 1974) is a French sailor who has sailed in multiple Volvo Ocean Races.

Born in Paris and raised in Brittany, Caudrelier is a merchant navy officer. He won the Solitaire du Figaro, a solo race, in 2004 and also completed the race in 2005 and 2006. He won the Transat Jacques Vabre, a two-man race, in 2009 and 2013.

He sailed in the 2011–12 Volvo Ocean Race on Groupama 4, which won the race.

He skippered the Dongfeng Race Team in the 2014–15 Volvo Ocean Race. Three years later, in the 2017–18 Volvo Ocean Race, he skippered the Dongfeng Race Team again, and this time they won.
