= Arnaud Boissières =

French offshore skipper (born 1972)

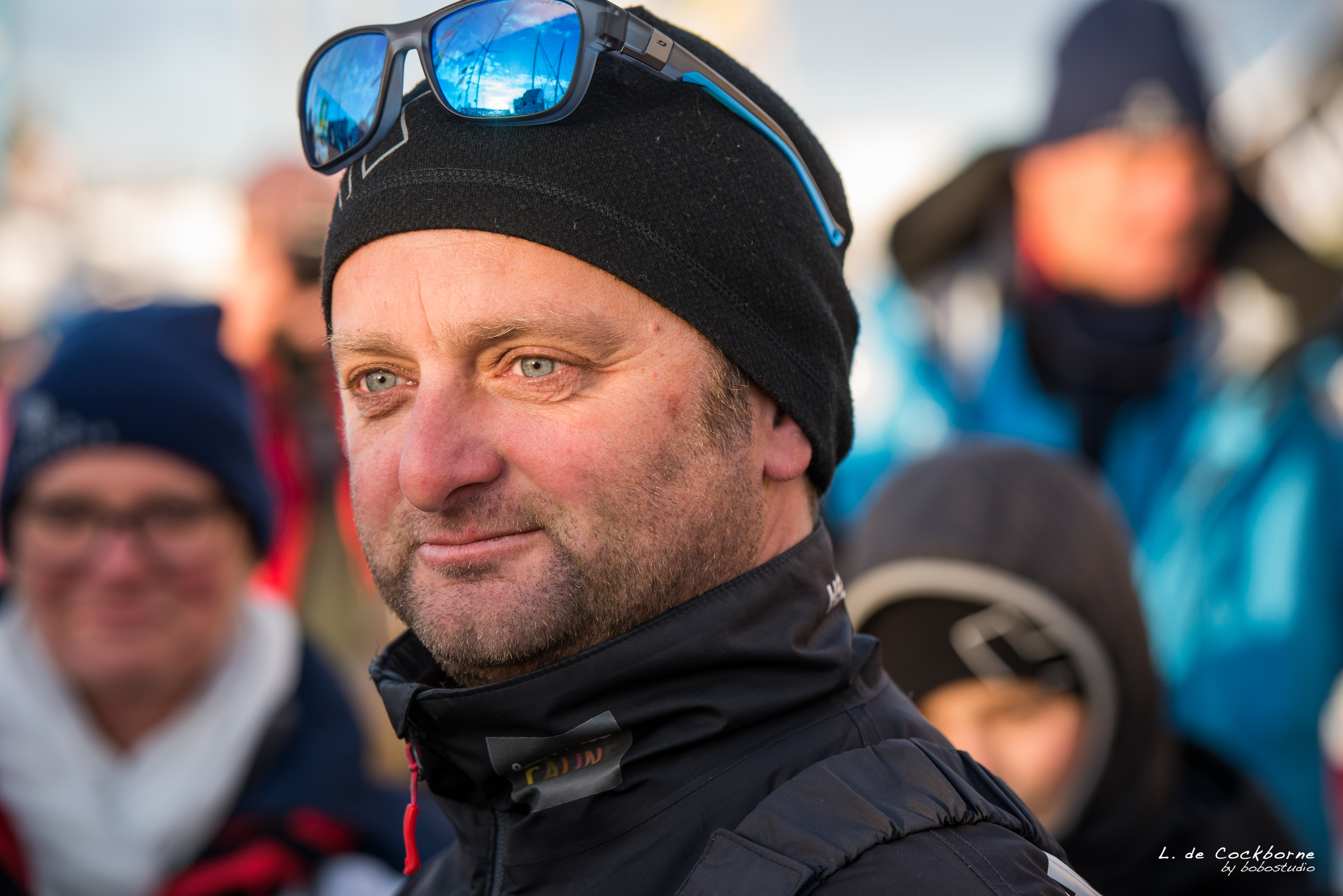
- At the start of the 2016 Vendée Globe

Personal information
- Nickname: Cali
- Nationality: French
- Born: 20 July 1972 (age 53) Nantes

Sailing career
- Sport: Sailing
- Class: IMOCA 60

Arnaud Boissières (born 20 July 1972) is a French professional offshore sailor. Boissières is the first sailor to start and finish four consecutive Vendée Globe races.

== Career highlights ==
Pos.	Year	Event	Class	Boat	Notes	Ref.
Round the world races
15	2021	2020–2021 Vendée Globe	IMOCA 60	La Mie Câline – Artisans Artipôle	94d 18h 36m 06s	
10	2017	2016–2017 Vendée Globe	IMOCA 60	La Mie câline	102d 20h 24m 09s	
8	2013	2012–2013 Vendée Globe	IMOCA 60	Akena Vérandas 3	91d 2h 09m 02s	
7	2009	2008–2009 Vendée Globe	IMOCA 60	Akena Vérandas 2	105d 2h 33m 50s	
DNF	2005	Jules Verne Trophy Attempt	-	Géronimo	skippered by Olivier de Kersauson	
Trans-Ocean Races
9	2018	2018 Route du Rhum	IMOCA 60			
11	2017	Transat Jacques Vabre	IMOCA 60		with Manuel Cousin	
RET	2015	2015 Transat Jacques Vabre	IMOCA 60	LE BATEAU DES METIERS BY AEROCAMPUS	with STANISLAS MASLARD	
6	2013	Transat Jacques Vabre	IMOCA 60			
DNF	2011	Transat Jacques Vabre	IMOCA 60		with GERALD VENIARD	
7	2010	2010 Route du Rhum				
7	2009	Transat Jacques Vabre				
7	2008	The Artemis Transat				
21	2004	Transat AG2R	Beneteau Figaro 2	BEZIERS MEDITERRANEE	with Y. CANO	
12	2002	Transat AG2R	Beneteau Figaro	DEPARTEMENT DE L'AISNE	with Jeanne Grégoire	
3	2001	Mini Transat Race	Mini Transat 6.50	Aquarelle.com		
25	1999	Mini Transat Race	Mini Transat 6.50		Dismasted repaired and continued	
Other Races
14	2020	Vendée-Arctique-Les Sables d'Olonne	IMOCA 60			
14	2019	Rolex Fastnet Race	IMOCA 60	La Mie Câline - Artipôle		
17	2019	Défi Azimut	IMOCA 60			
9	2019	Bermuda 1000 Race	IMOCA 60			
1	2005	Ecuador Route				
3	2001	Mini Fastnet	Mini Transat 6.50	Aquarelle.com		

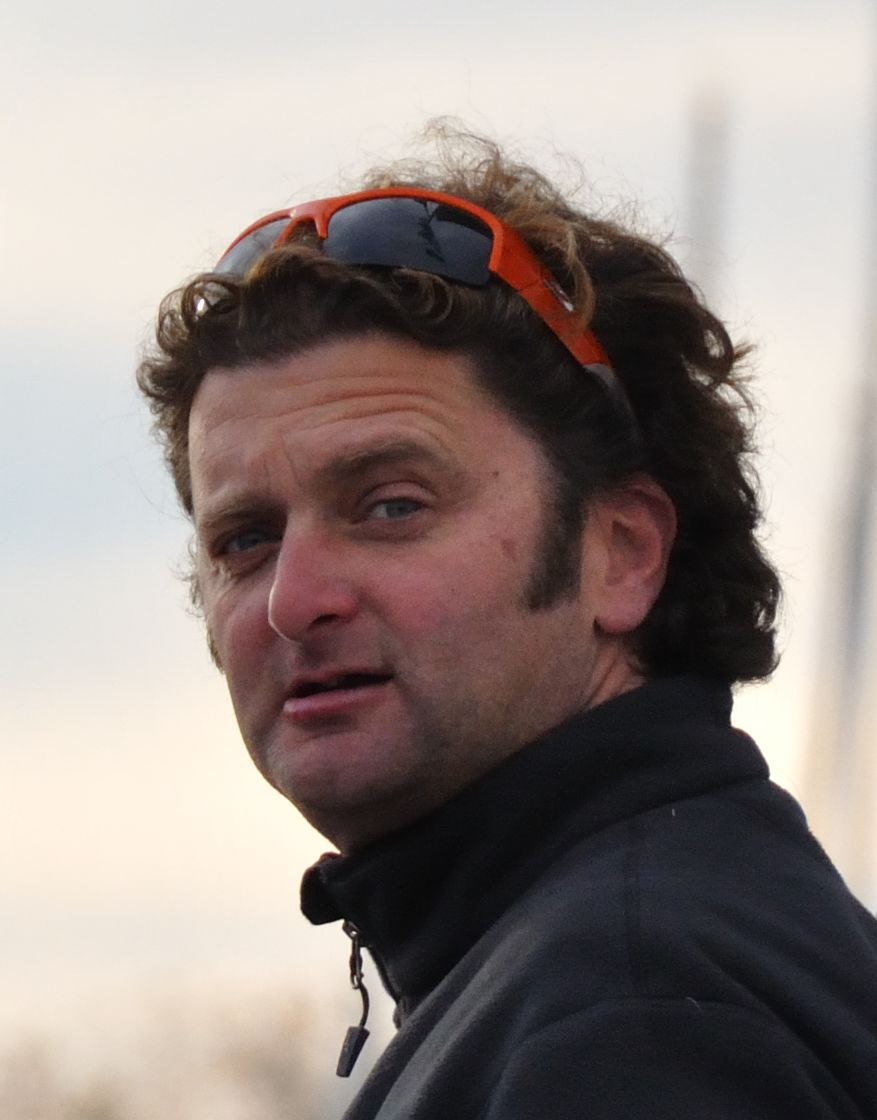
Arnaud Boissières in 2012.

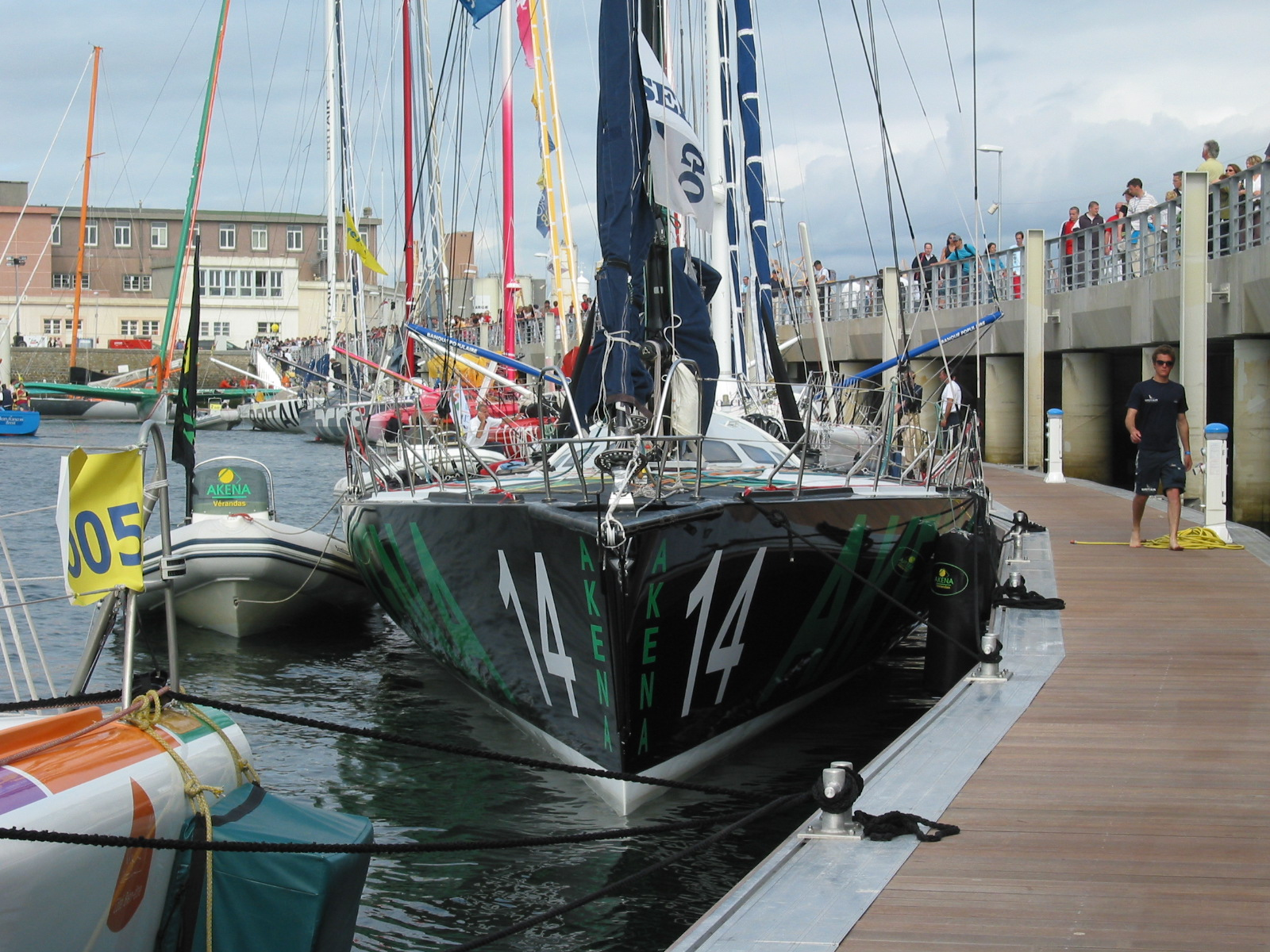
Akena Vérandas and VMI in 2008

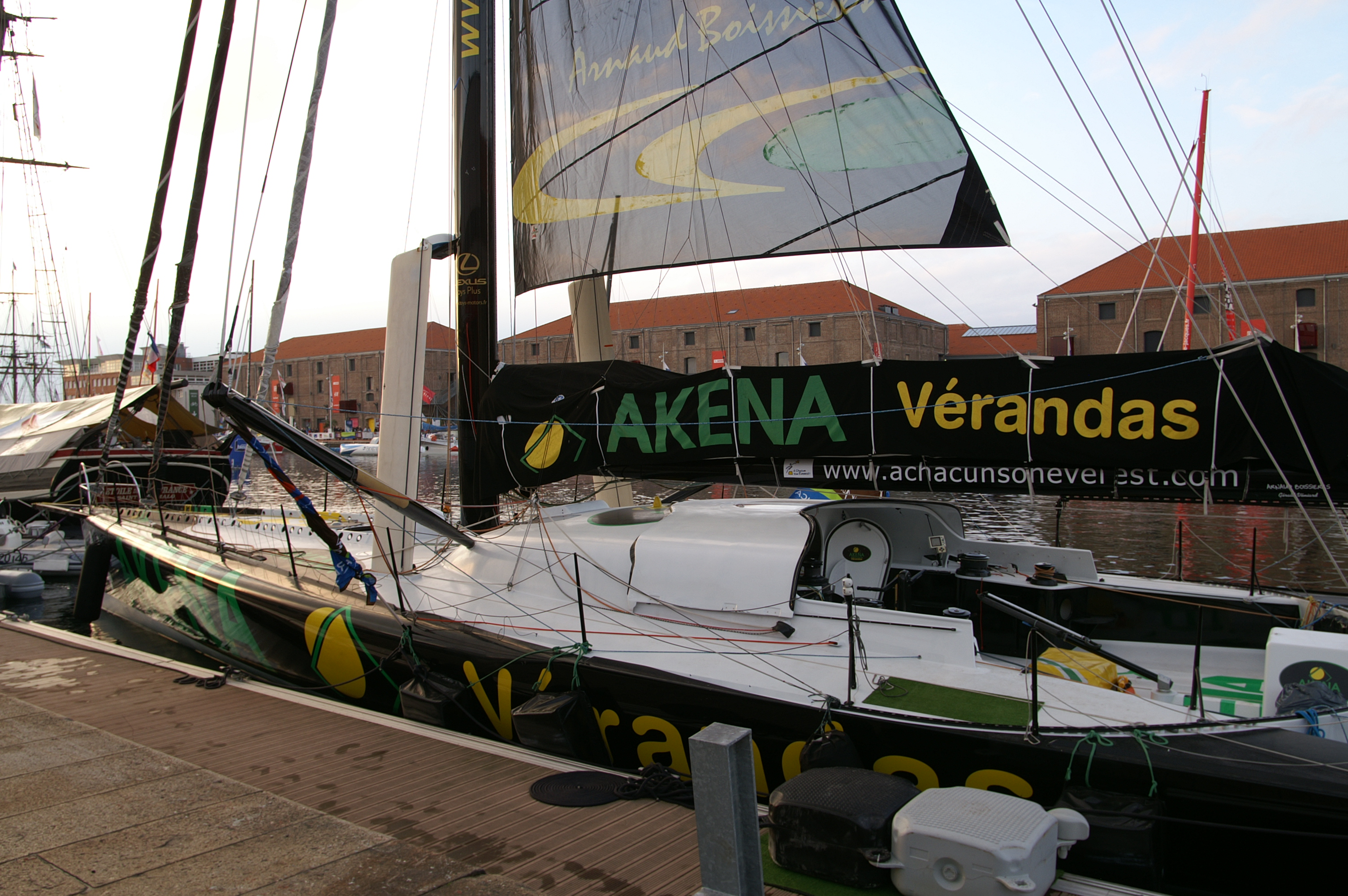
Akena Vérandas and PRB in 2011

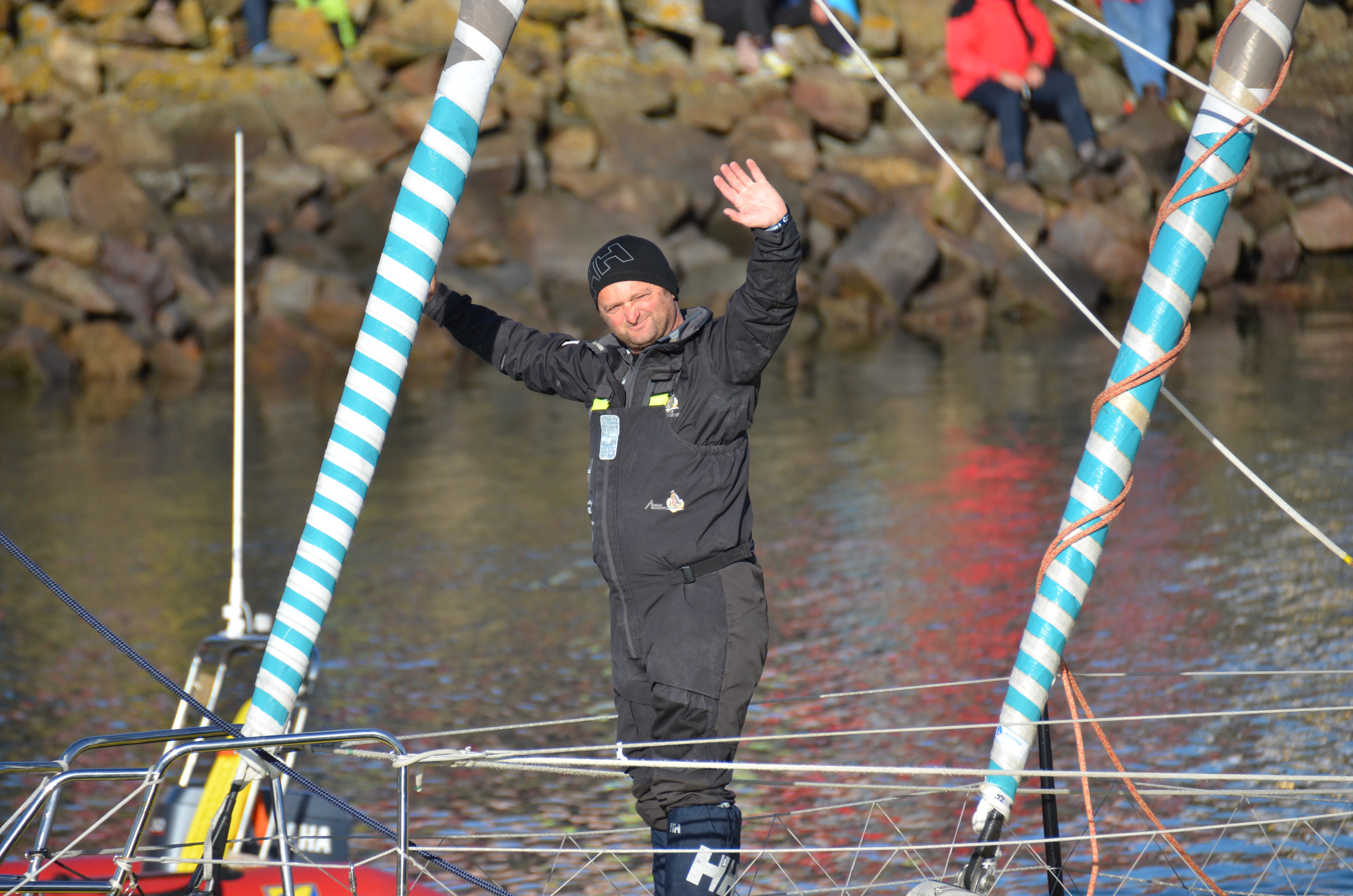
Departure of Arnaud Boissières on the 2016-2017 Vendée Globe

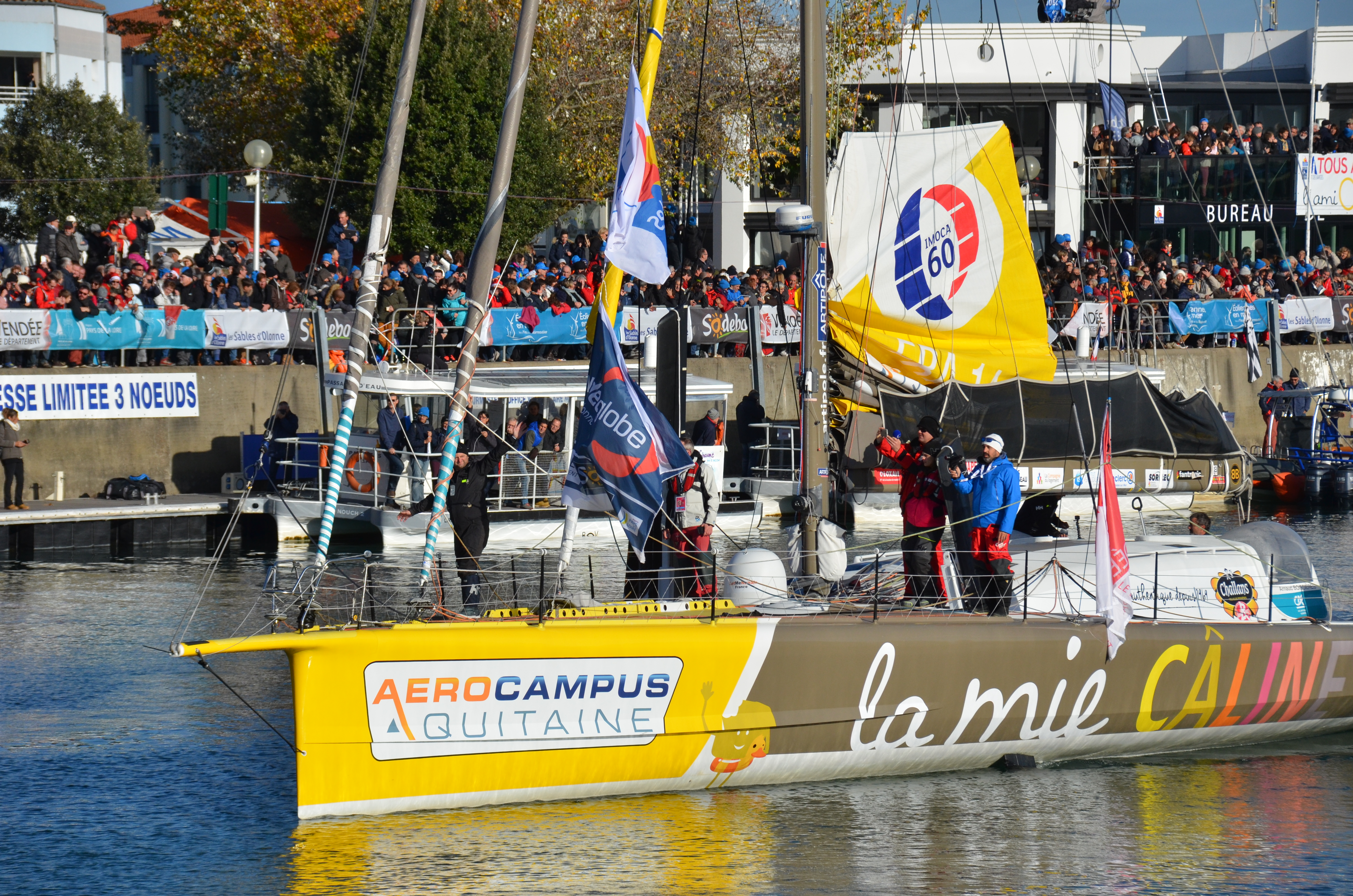
Departure of Arnaud Boissières on the 2016-2017 Vendée Globe

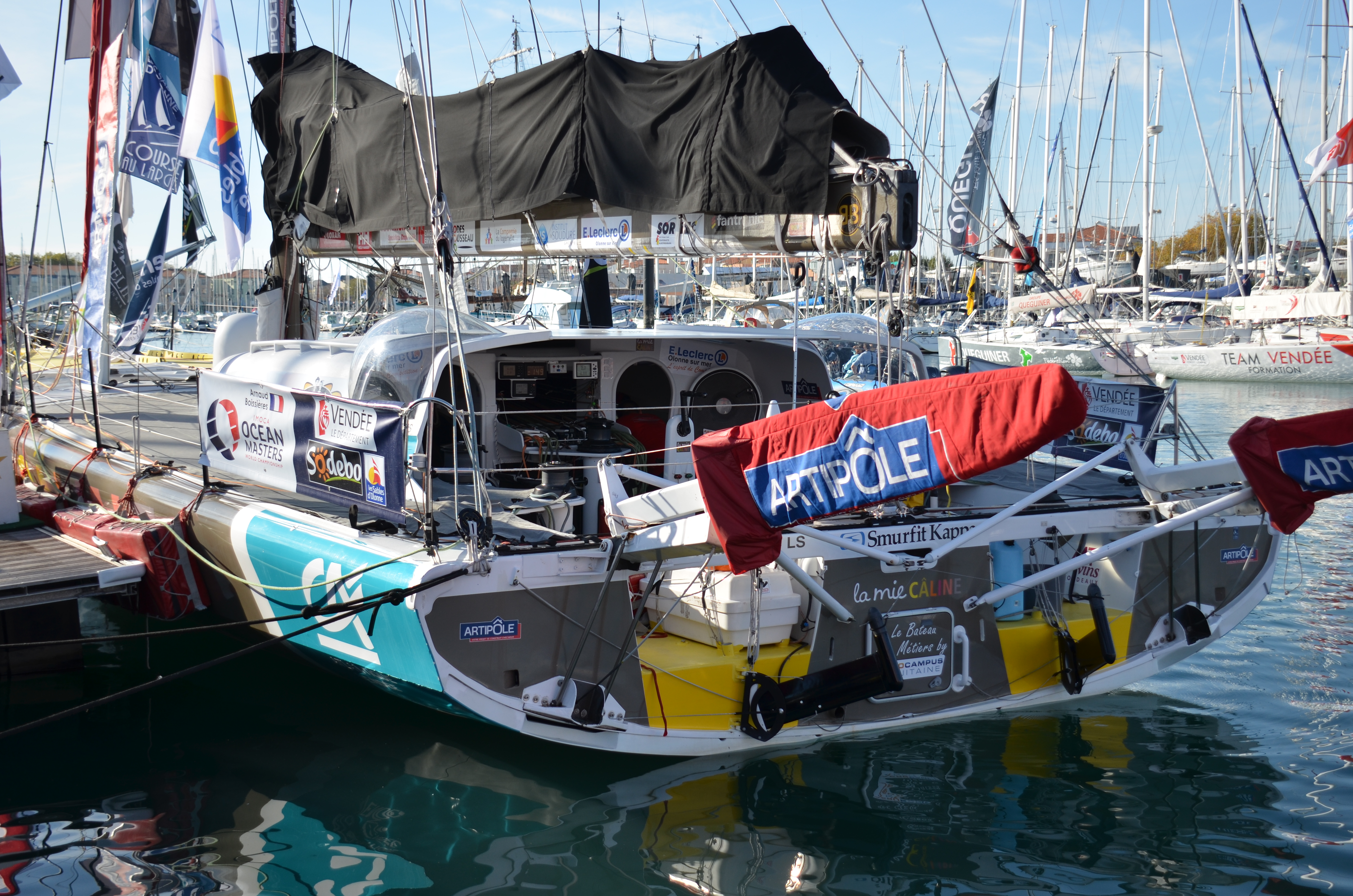
-.

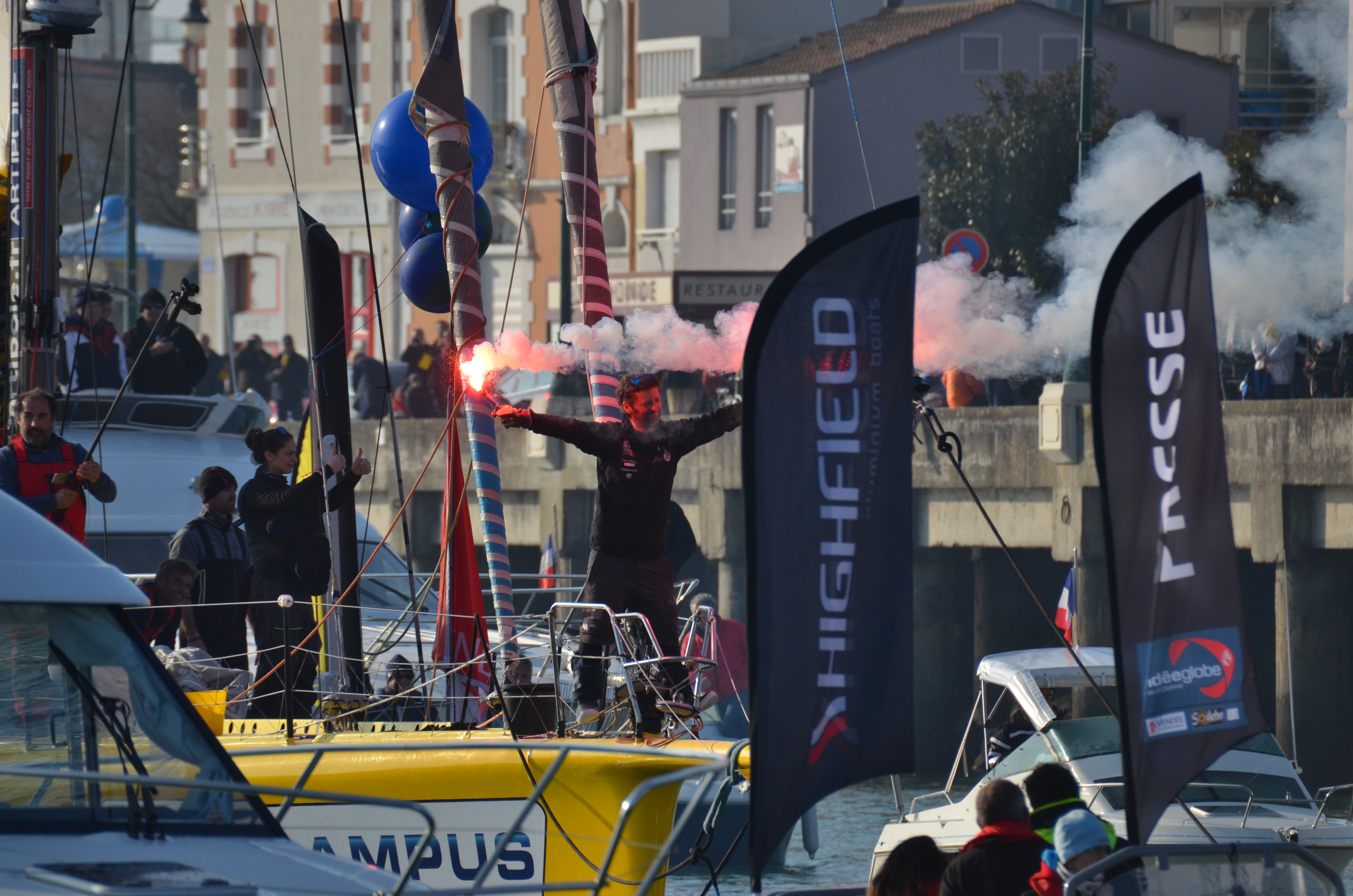
Arrival Arnaud Boissières following the 2016-2017 Vendée Globe

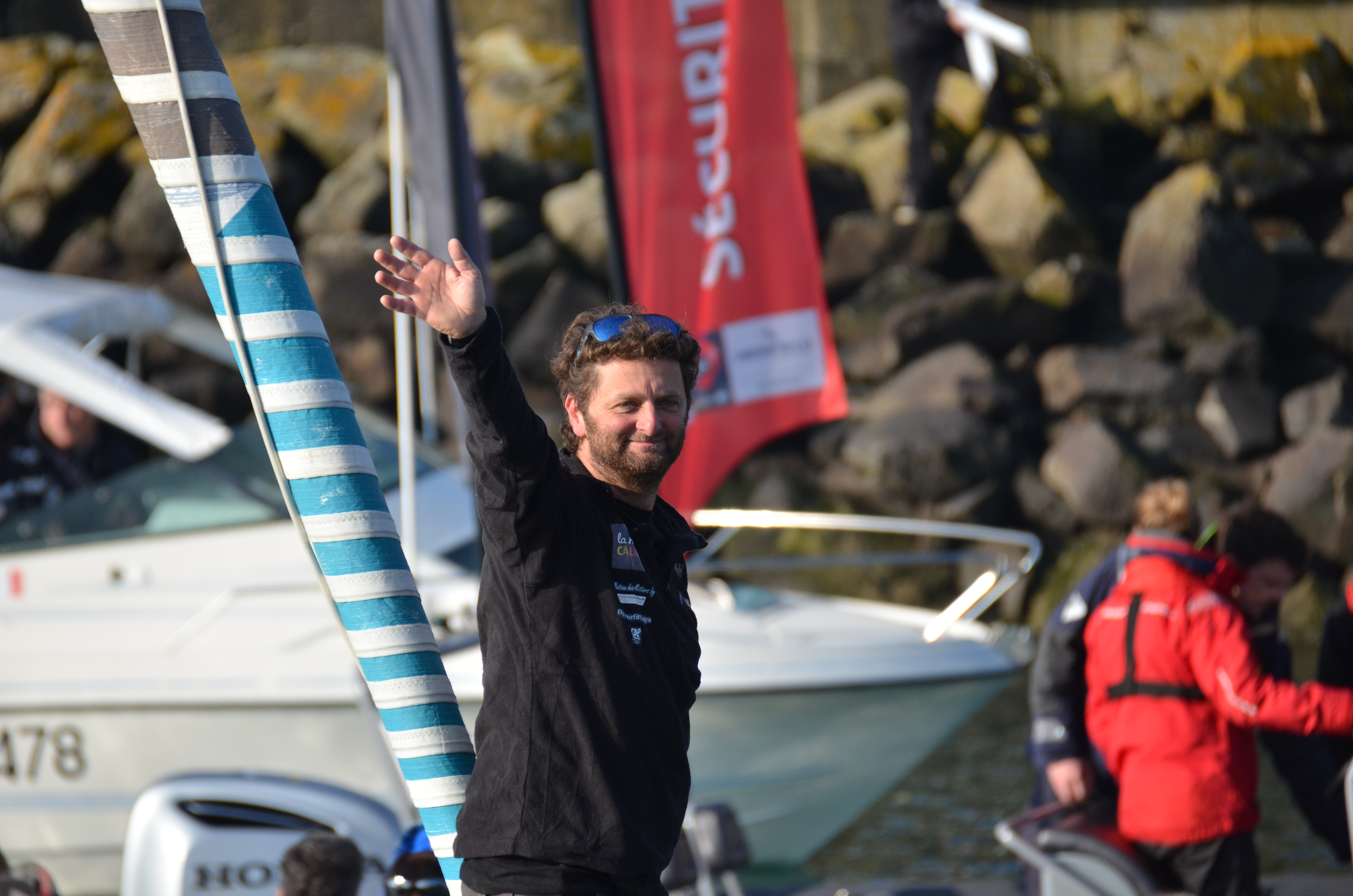
Arrival Arnaud Boissières following the 2016-2017 Vendée Globe
