= Emma Richards (sailor) =

English sailor (born 1975)

Emma Charlotte Richards MBE (born 1975) is a British sailor. In 2002–03, she became the first British woman and youngest person to complete the Around Alone, a 29,000-mile, single-handed round the world yacht race with stops. She was a crew member during the Volvo Ocean Race 2001–2002 on Amer Sports Too.

From a young age she spent much time sailing. At 11 she competed in dinghy world championships. She took a degree in sports medicine at the University of Glasgow. She was awarded an MBE in the New Years Honours List 2004, in recognition of her achievements.
