= IMOCA 60 Estrella Damm =

Offshore Racing Sailboat

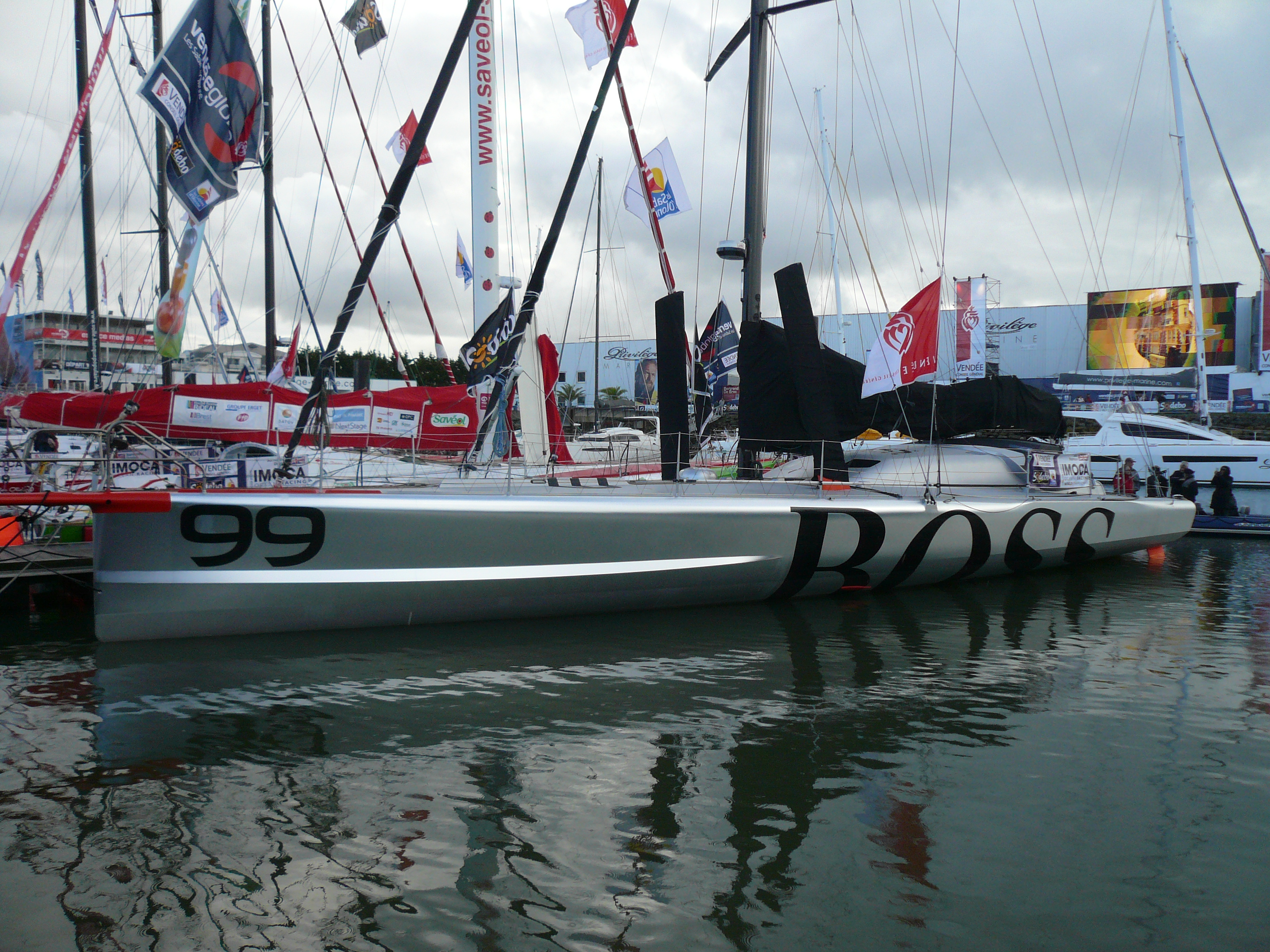

Development
- Designer: Farr Yacht Design, Bruce Farr
- Year: 26 June 2007
- Builder(s): Offshore Challenges, Cowes GBR

Racing
- Class association: IMOCA 60

The IMOCA 60 class yacht Estrella Damm was designed by Farr Yacht Design and launched in the 2007 after being built by Offshore Challenges who are not a boatbuilder (they run campaigns and events and were responsible for supporting Ellen McArthur) but brought in specialist to build the boat in Cowes on the Isle of Wight in England. This racing yacht is not to be confused with Estrella Damm 2, which competed in the 2010 Barcelona World Race.

== Names and ownership ==
Estrella Damm (2007)

- Skipper: Jonathan McKee

BT (2008–2009)

- Skipper: Sebastien Josse

Veolia Environnement (2010)

- Skipper: Roland Jourdain

Hugo Boss 4 (2011–2013)

- Skipper: Alex Thomson

Neutrogena (2014–2015)

- Skipper: Guillermo Altadill and Jose Muñoz

Adopteunskipper.net (2015)

- Skipper: Nicolas Boidevezi

Spirit of Yukoh IV (2016–2018)

- Skipper: Kojiro Shiraishi

Water Family (2019–2020)

- Skipper: Benjamin Dutreux

Omia - Water Family (2020–2021)

- Skipper: Benjamin Dutreux

Freelance.com (since)

- Skipper: Guirec Soudée
- Sail no.: FRA 22

== Racing results ==
Pos	Year	Race	Class	Boat name	Skipper	Notes	Ref
Round the world races
9 / 33	2020	2020–2021 Vendée Globe	IMOCA 60	Omia - Water Family, FRA 09	Benjamin Dutreux (FRA)	81d 19h 45m 20s	
DNF	2016	2016–2017 Vendée Globe	IMOCA 60	Spirit of Yukoh IV, JPN 11	Kojiro Shiraishi (JPN)	Mast Breakage	
2 / 8	2014	Barcelona World Race	IMOCA 60	NEUTROGENA, ESP 1972	José Muñoz & Guillermo Altadill	89d 11h 47m	
3 / 20	2012	2012–2013 Vendée Globe	IMOCA 60	Hugo Boss 4, GBR 99	Alex Thomson (FRA)	80d 19h 23m	
DNF	2008	2008–2009 Vendée Globe	IMOCA 60	BT, EUR 888	Sebastien Josse (FRA)		
DNF	2007	Barcelona World Race	IMOCA 60	Estrella Damm	Jonathan McKee (USA); Guillermo Altadill (ESP)	Retired to Cape Town	
Transatlantic Races
19 / 29	2019	Transat Jacques Vabre	IMOCA 60	Water Family, FRA 09	Thomas Cardrin (FRA); Benjamin Dutreux (FRA)		
7 / 14	2017	Transat New-York – Vendée	IMOCA 60	Spirit of Yukoh IV, JPN 11	Kojiro Shiraishi (JPN)	12d 01h 00m	
DNF / 42	2015	Transat Jacques Vabre	IMOCA 60	Adopte un skipper.net, FRA 719	Ryan BREYMAIER; Nicolas BOIDEVEZI		
World Record	2012	New York-Cap Lizard	IMOCA 60	Hugo Boss 4, GBR 99	Alex Thomson (FRA)	8d 22h 08m	
4 / 8	2011	Transat B to B	IMOCA 60	Hugo Boss 4, GBR 99	Alex Thomson (FRA)	10d 01h 43m	
2 / 13	2011	Route du Rhum	IMOCA 60	Hugo Boss 4, GBR 99	Alex Thomson (FRA); Guillermo Altadill (FRA)		
1 / 9	2010	Route du Rhum	IMOCA 60	VEOLIA Environnement, FRA 29	Roland Jourdain (FRA)	13d 17h 11m	
DNF / 14	2009	Transat Jacques Vabre	IMOCA 60	BT, EUR 888	Sebastien Josse (FRA); François CUZON		
DNF / 13	2008	The Artemis Transat	IMOCA 60	BT, EUR 888	Sebastien Josse (FRA)		
Other Races

== Gallery ==
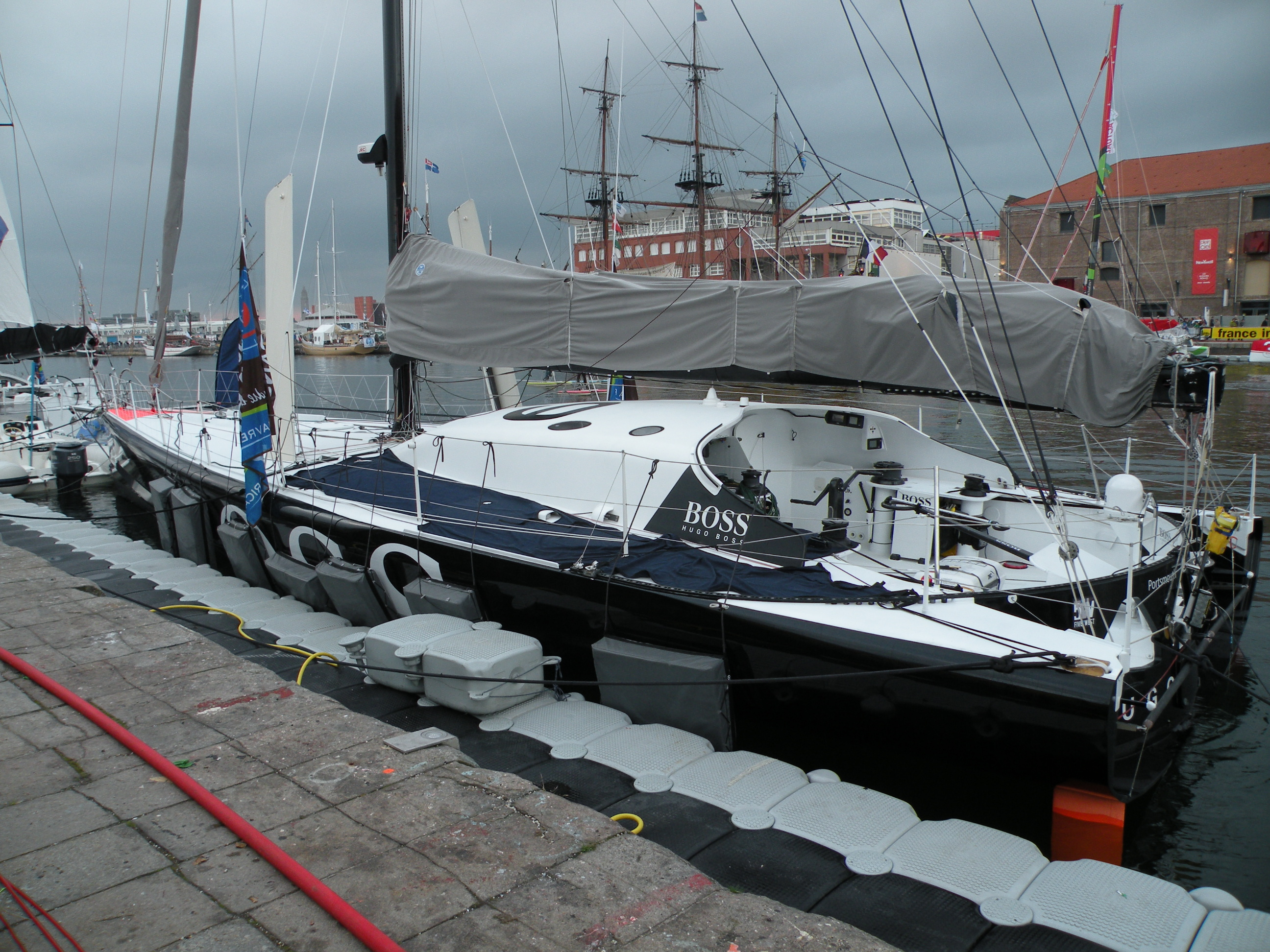

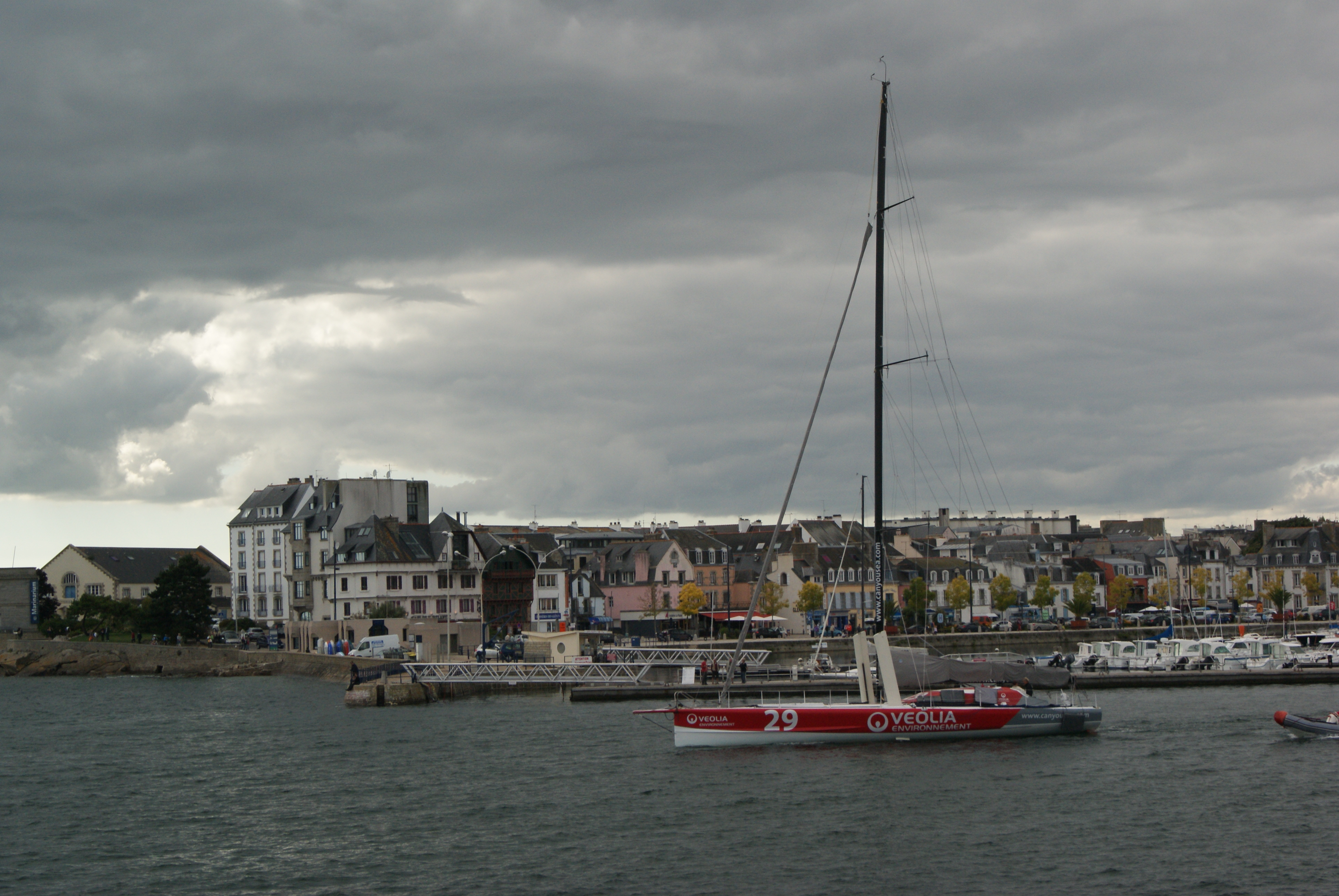

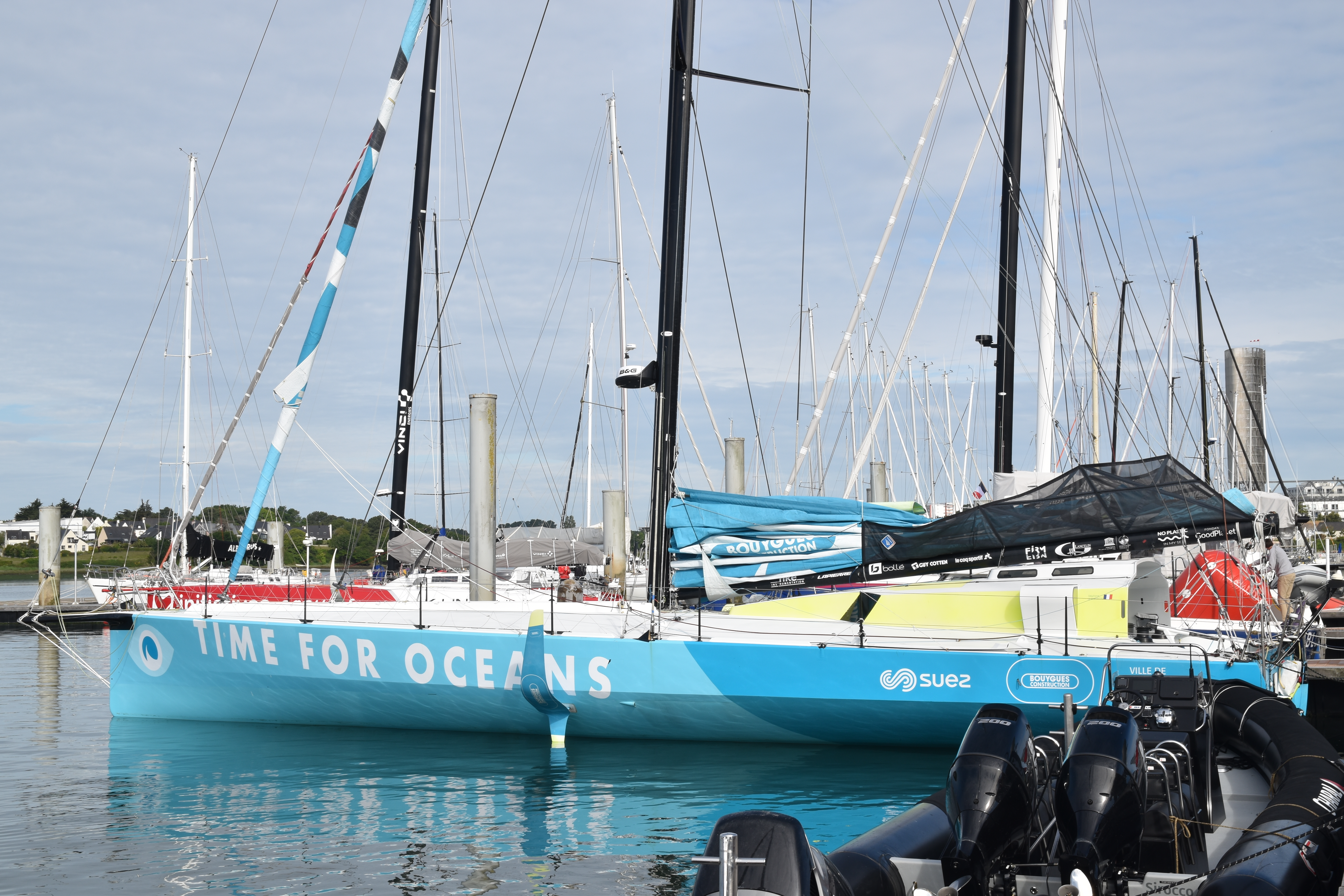

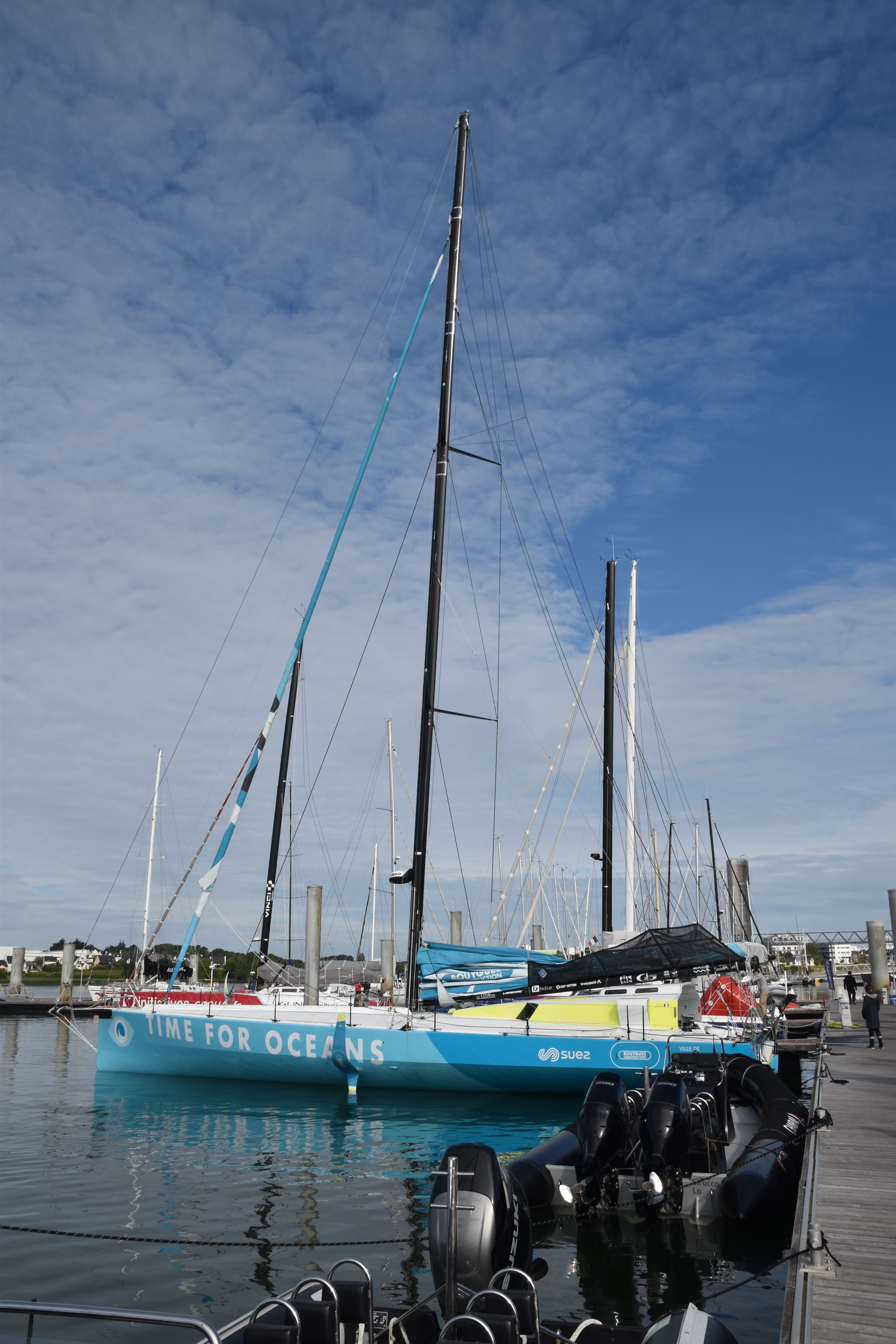

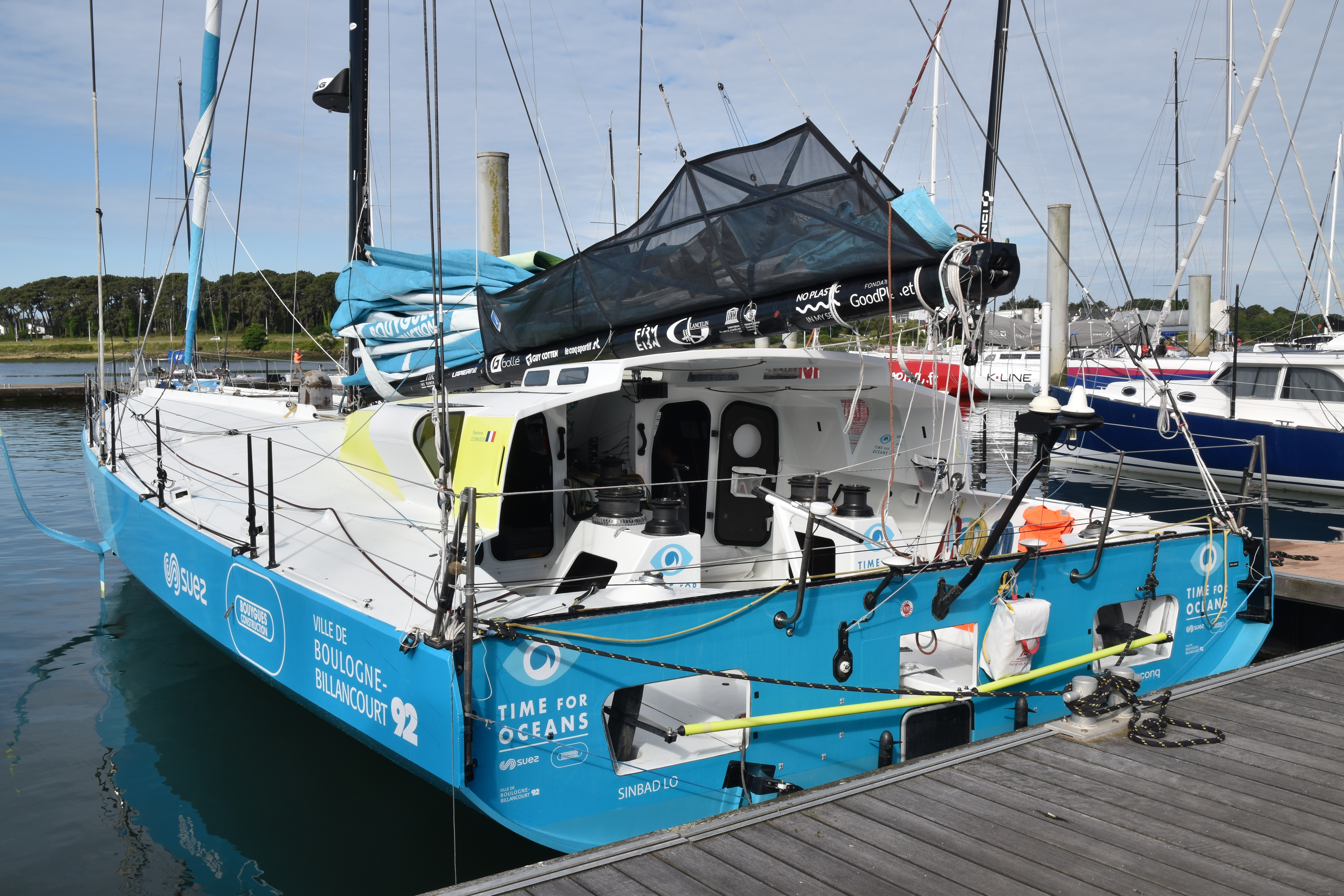

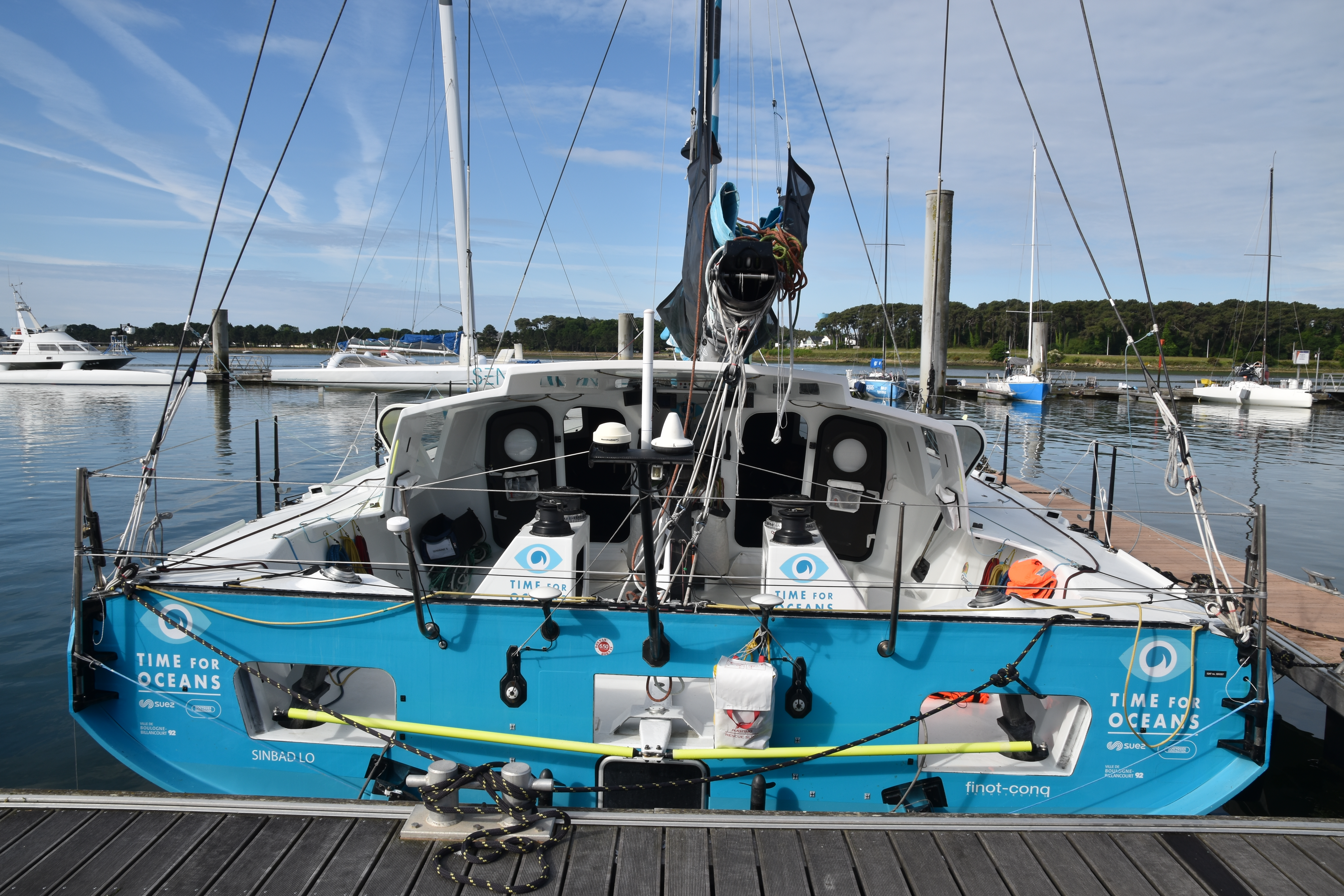

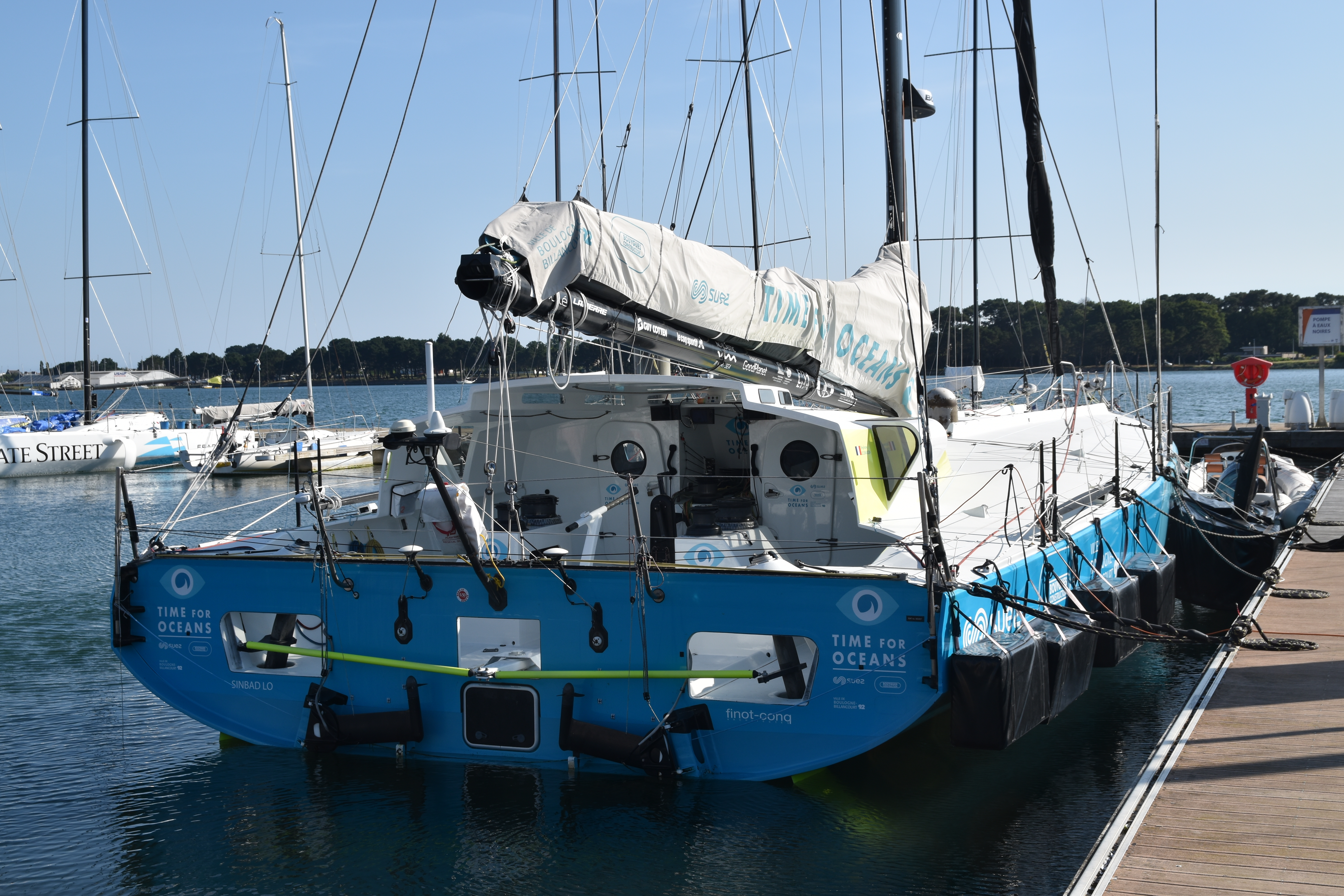

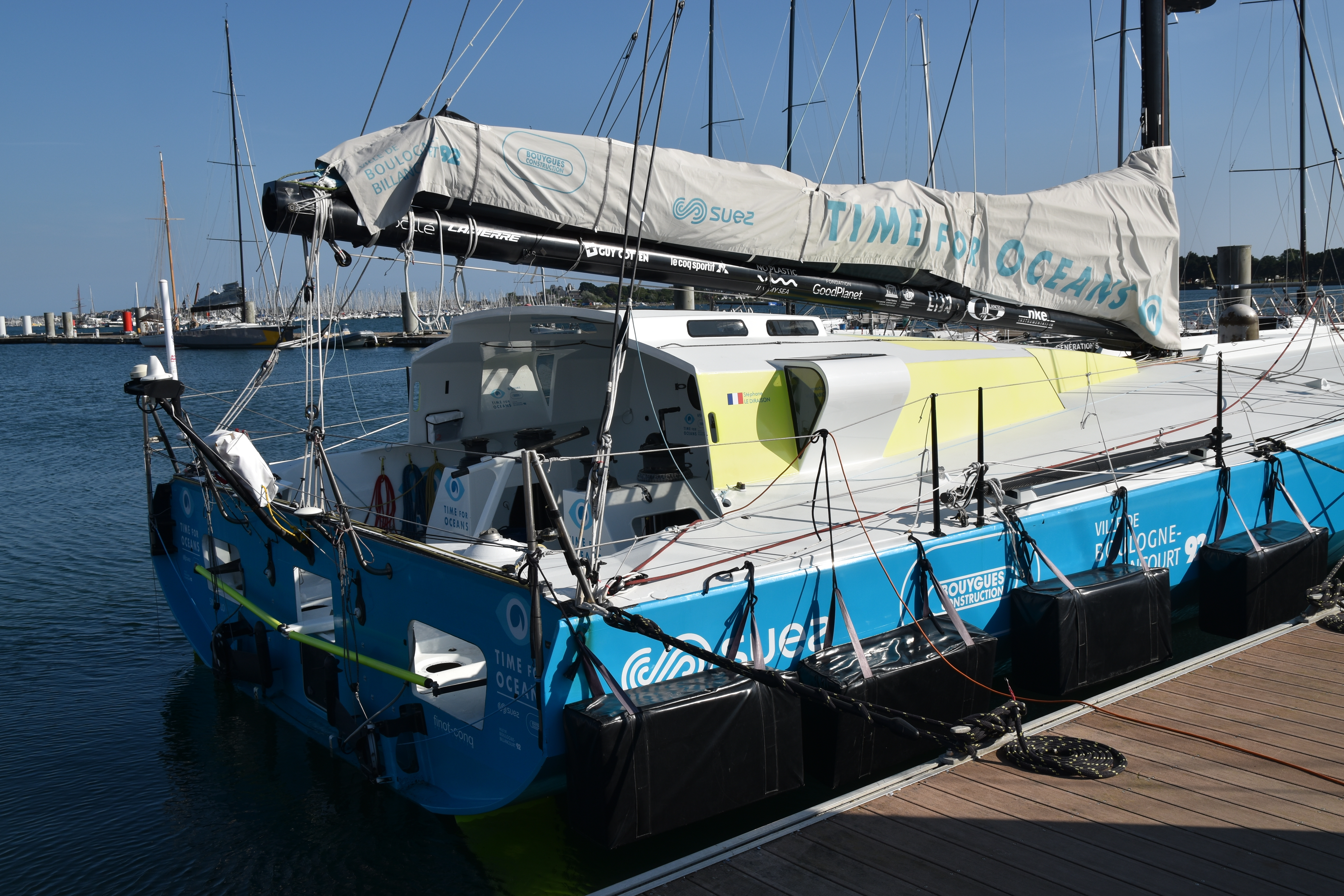

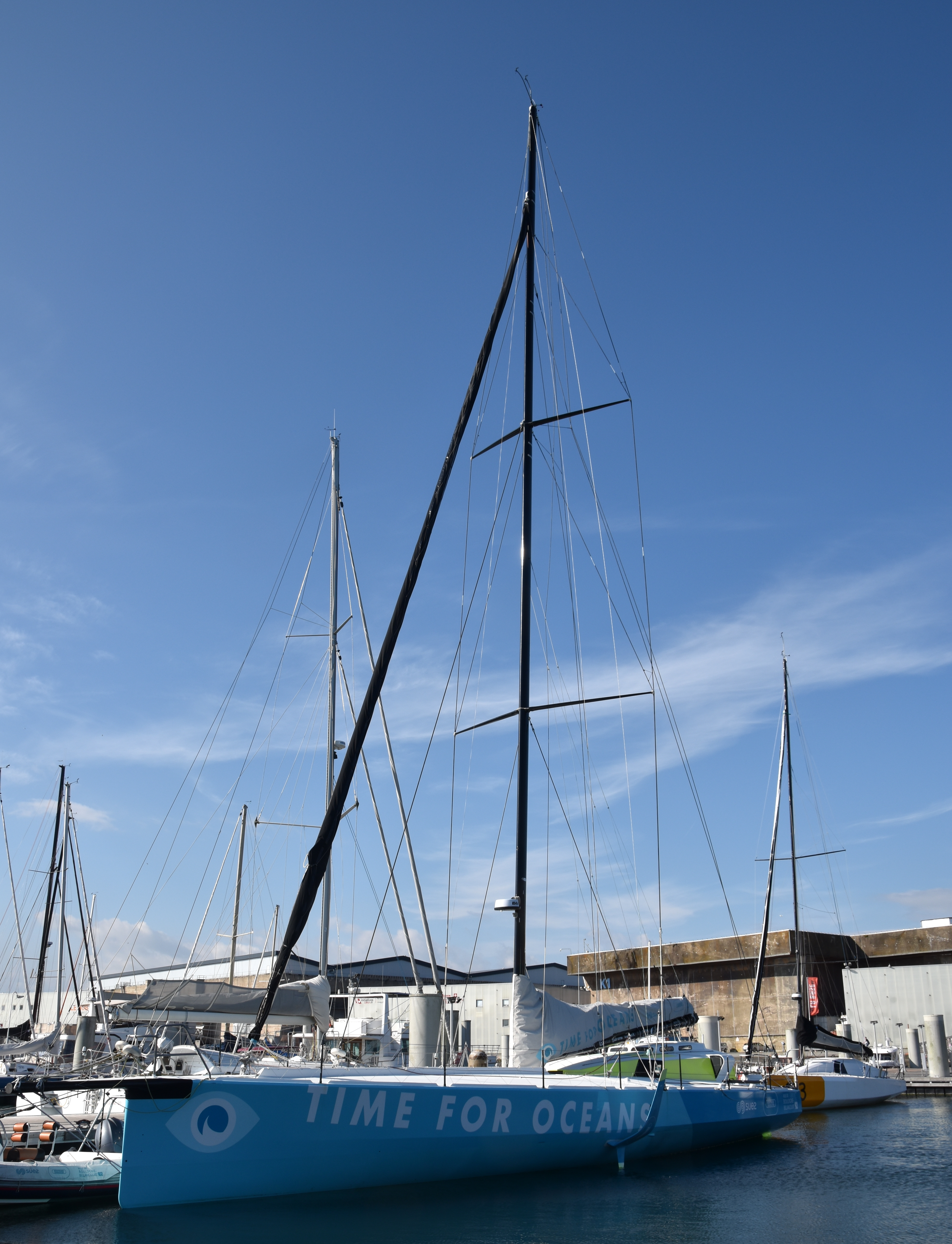

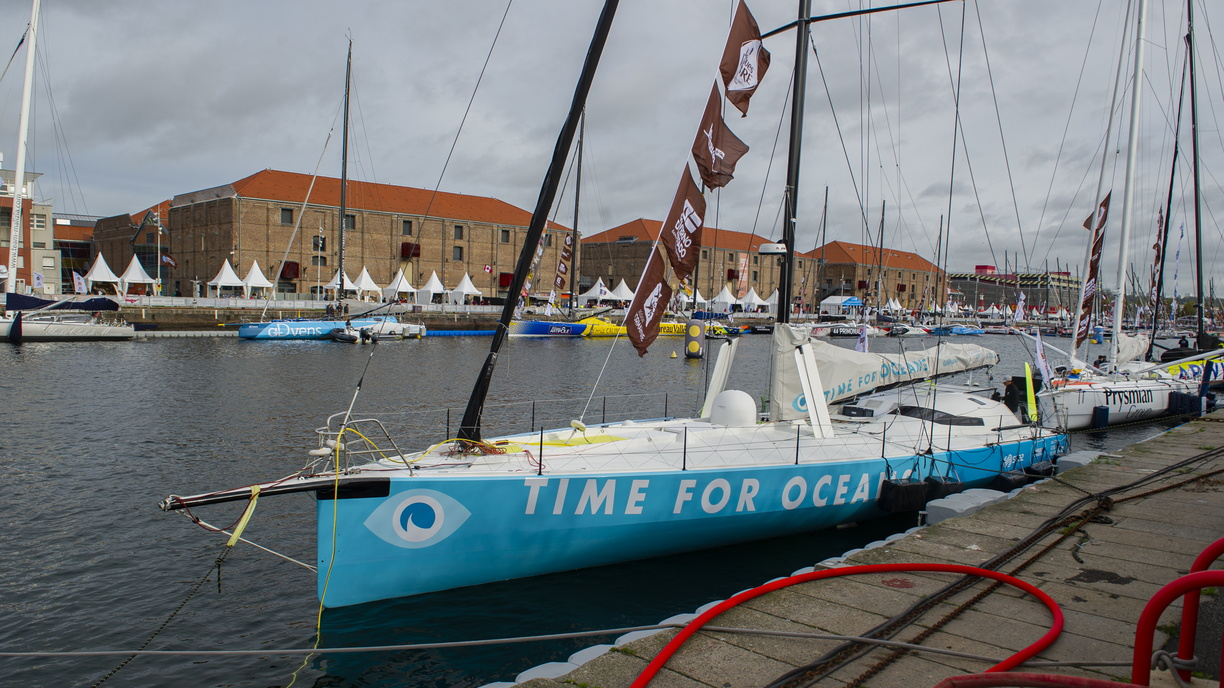
