= IMOCA =

IMOCA or iMOCA may refer to:

- Indianapolis Museum of Contemporary Art
- International Monohull Open Class Association
- IMOCA 50, a former 50ft racing yacht class
- IMOCA 60, an active 60ft racing yacht class used for Vendee Globe
