= IMOCA 60 Temenos 2 =

Sailboat

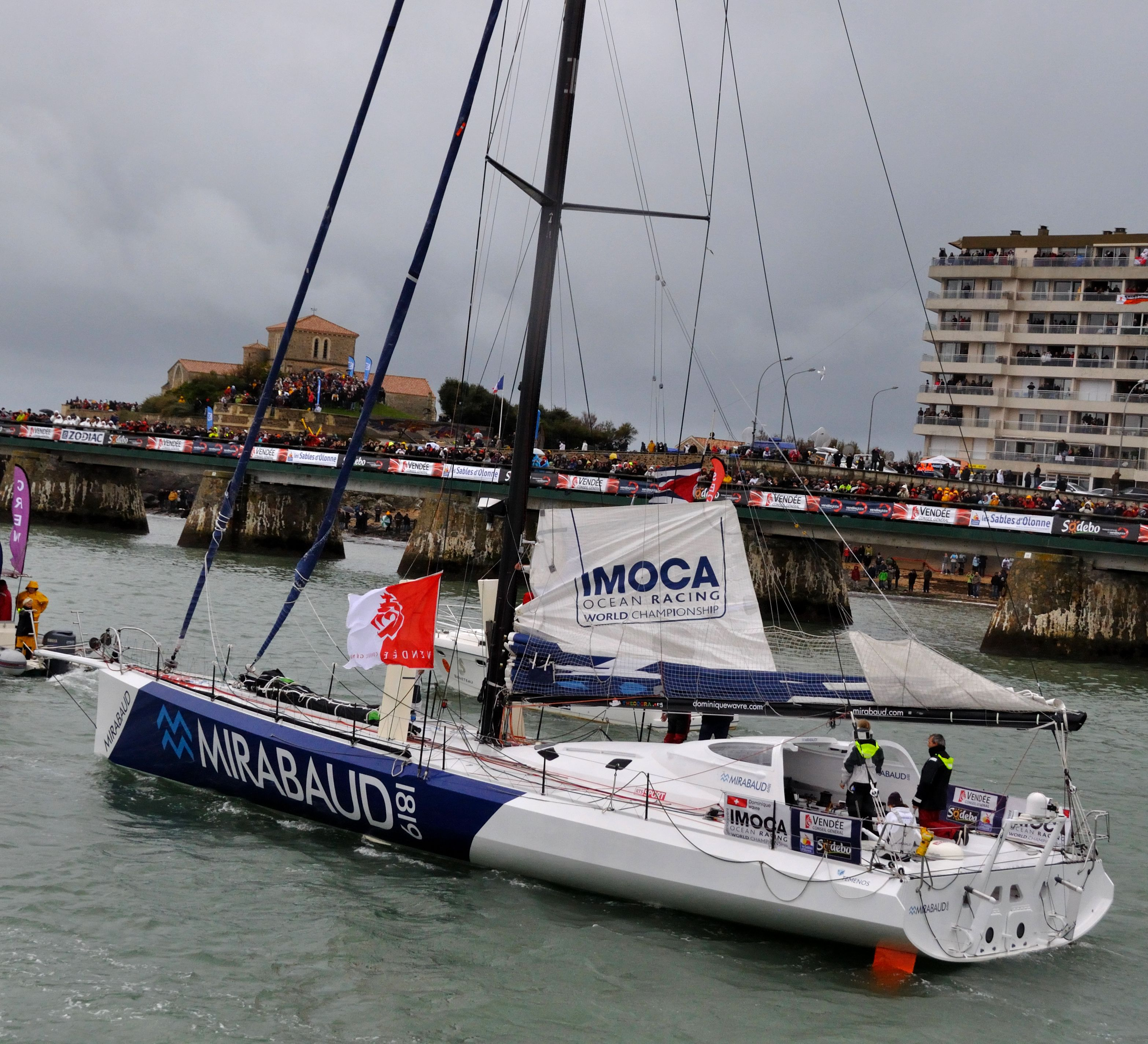

Development
- Year: 1 September 2006
- Builder: Southern Ocean Marine (NZL)

Boat
- Draft: 4.5 m (15 ft)

Hull
- Beam: 5.5 m (18 ft)

Hull appendages

Racing
- Class association: IMOCA 60

The IMOCA 60 class yacht Demain c'est loin (baptismal name: Temenos II) was designed by Owen Clark Design and launched in September 2006 after being made by Southern Ocean Marine in New Zealand. The boat is a development of Ecover 2 and Aviva made by the same builder and designer and looks like the same moulds.

The boat sailed formerly under the names Temenos II, Mirabaud, Great America IV and Campagne de France.

== Racing results ==
Pos	Year	Race	Class	Boat name	Skipper	Notes	Ref
Round the world races
22 / 33	2021	2020-2021 Vendée Globe	IMOCA 60	Campagne de France, FRA 50	Miranda Merron (GBR)	101d 08h 56m	
13 / 29	2016	2016-2017 Vendée Globe	IMOCA 60	Great America IV, USA 37	Rich Wilson (USA)	107d 00h 48m	
7 / 20	2013	2012-2013 Vendée Globe	IMOCA 60	Mirabaud 1819, SUI 09	Dominique Wavre (SUI)	90d 03h 14m	
DNF	2011	2010-2011 Barcelona World Race	IMOCA 60	Mirabaud, SUI 09	Dominique Wavre (SUI); Michéle Parret (FRA)	98d 06h 09m	
DNF	2009	2008-2009 Vendée Globe	IMOCA 60	Temenos (2) SUI 9	Dominique Wavre (SUI)	Keel Issues	
3 / 9	2008	2007-2008 Barcelona World Race	IMOCA 60	Temesos (2) SUI 9	Dominique Wavre (SUI); Michéle Parret (FRA)	98d 06h 09m	
Transatlantic Races
Other Races
