= IMOCA 60 Paprec 3 =

Sailboat

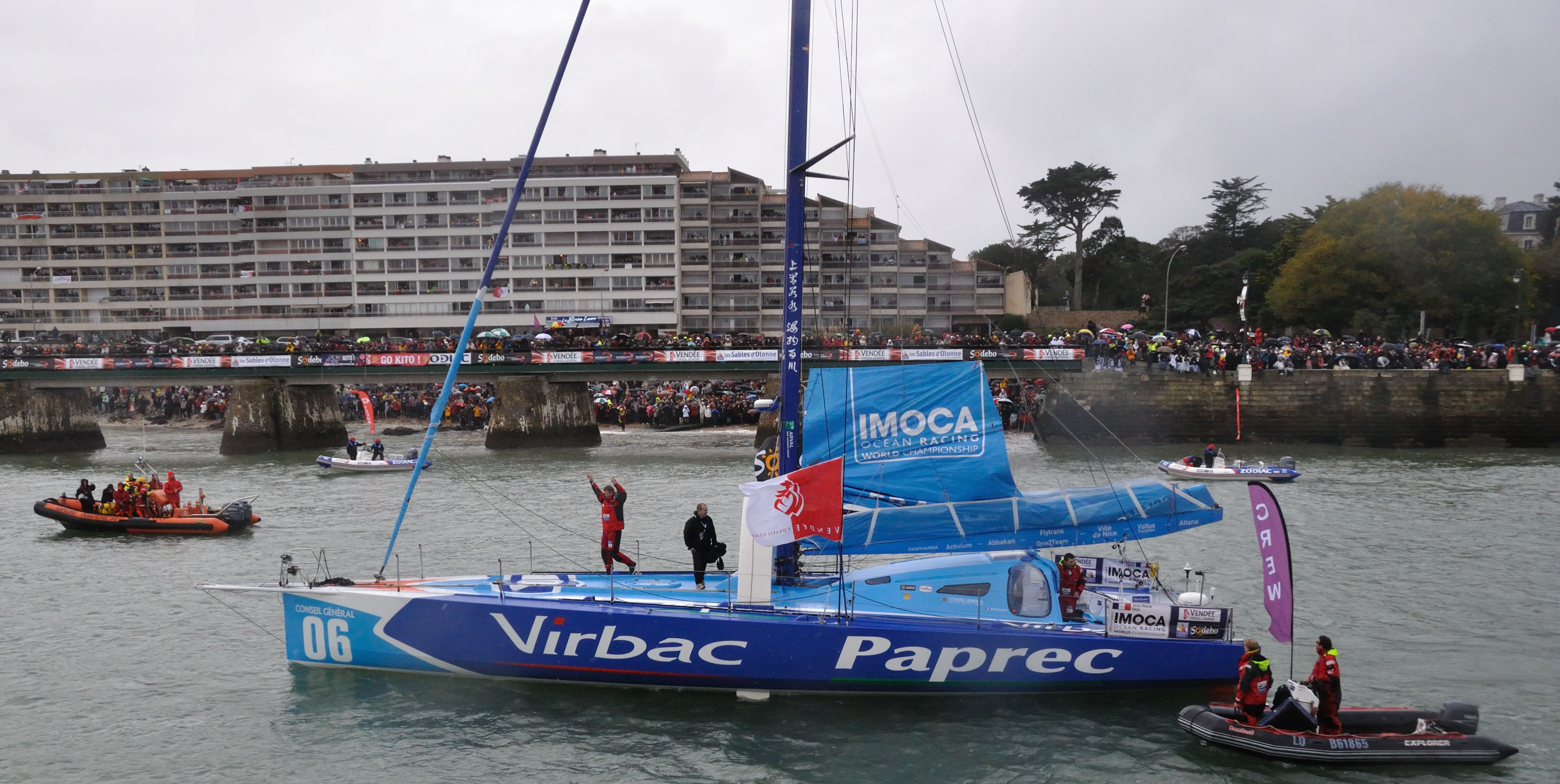

Development
- Designer: VPLP Design, Guillaume Verdier
- Year: 18 May 2010
- Builder: Cookson Boats (NZL) Ltd

Racing
- Class association: IMOCA 60

The IMOCA 60 class yacht Paprec-Virbac 3 was designed in partnership with VPLP and Guillaume Verdier and launched on 18 May 2010 after being built by Cookson Boats in New Zealand. The yacht was named after the companies that sponsored its construction, Virbac and Paprec. It was lost during the 2016 Vendée Globe where the skipper was rescued. In November 2018, the remains of written off yacht were found on the east coast of Madagascar.

== Racing results ==
Pos	Year	Race	Class	Boat name	Skipper	Notes	Ref
Round the world races
DNF	2017	2016–2017 Vendée Globe	IMOCA 60	Bastide-Otio, FRA 30	Kito De Pavant (FRA)	Sank	
DNF	2015	Barcelona World Race	IMOCA 60	Hugo Boss 5	Pepe Ribes (ESP); Alex Thomson (GBR)	Dismasted	
4 / 20	2013	2012–2013 Vendée Globe	IMOCA 60	VIRBAC-PAPREC 3	Jean-Pierre Dick (FRA)	86d 03h 03m Finishes with no keel!	
1 / 14	2010	Barcelona World Race	IMOCA 60	VIRBAC-PAPREC 3	Loick Peyron (FRA); Jean-Pierre Dick (FRA)	93d 22h 20m	
Transatlantic Races
Other Races
