= International Monohull Open Classes Association =

IMOCA
- International Monohull Open Class Association
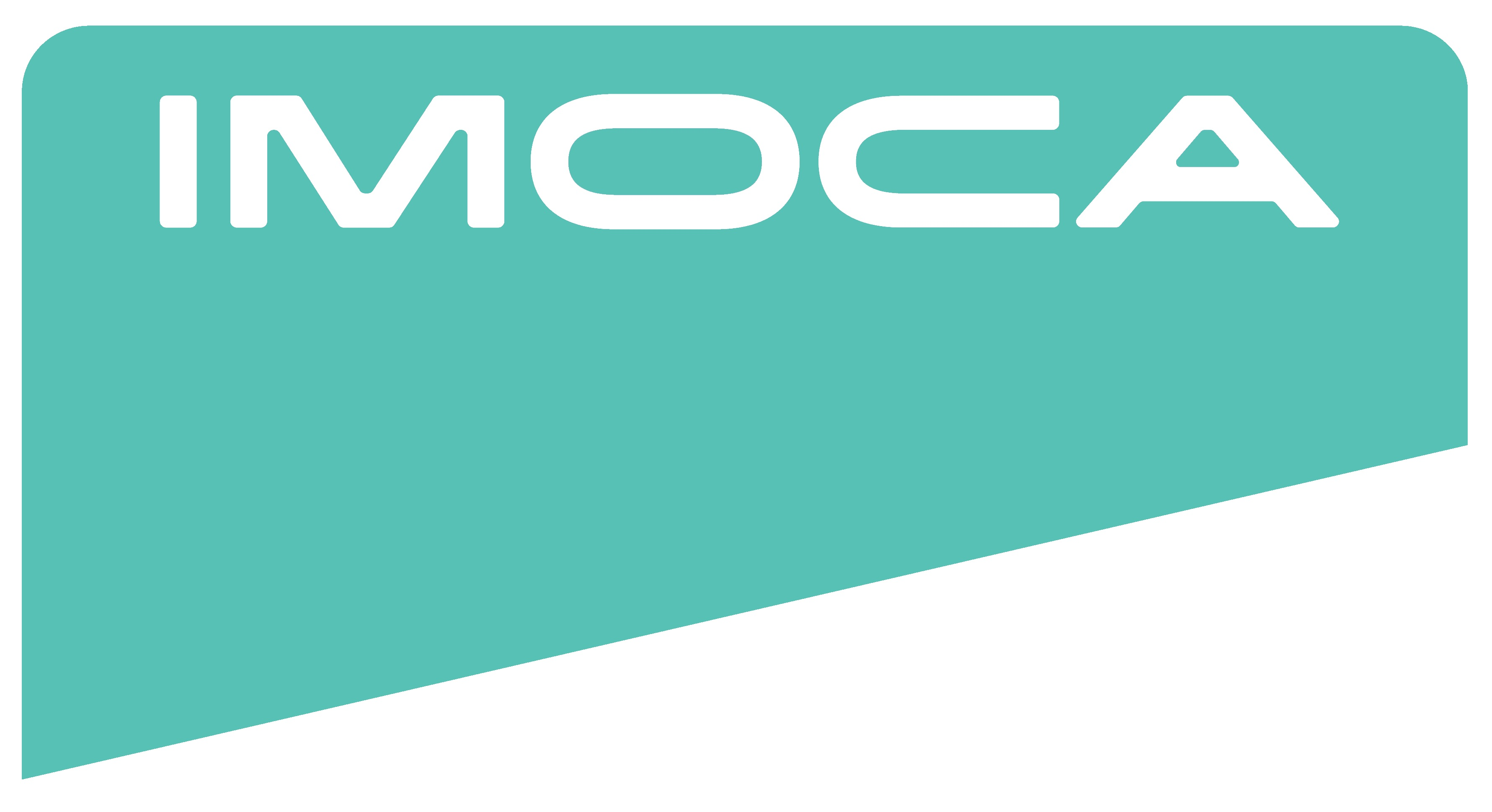
- Formation: 1991
- Headquarters: Lorient and Paris, France
- President: Antoine Mermod
- Website: imoca.org

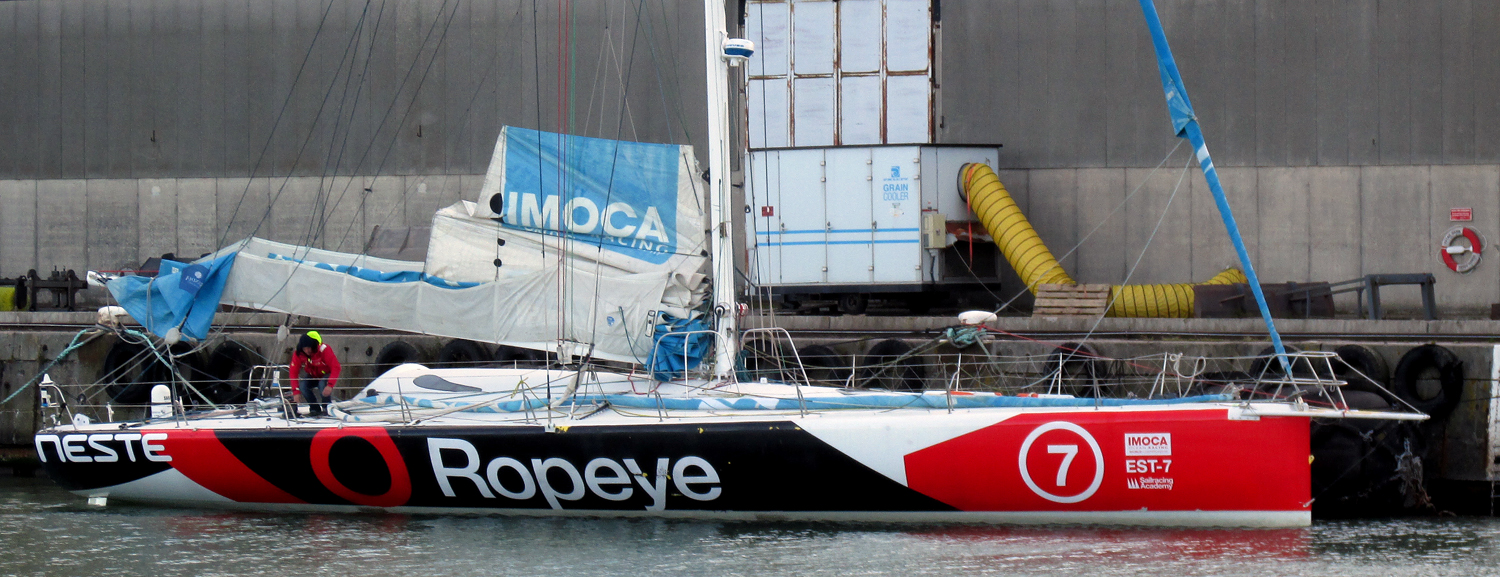
Ropeye IMOCA 60, in the port of Ystad 2017.

The International Monohull Open Class Association (IMOCA) is the governing body of the IMOCA class. Its main task is to design the class regulations for the ocean racing yachts IMOCA 60 and organising single-handed regattas. It was established in 1991. IMOCA has been a member of World Sailing (governing body of international sailing sport) since 1999.

== History ==
- Until its discontinuation, the association was also in charge of the IMOCA 50 class.
- It was the sanctioning authority for the Barcelona World Race.
- IMOCA organized the Ocean Masters World Championship named International Monohull Open Classes Association World Championship until 2014. In 2018 it discontinued in favour of the IMOCA Globe Series.

== IMOCA Globe Series ==
The IMOCA Globe Series was conceived in 2018. Each skipper collects points throughout the season based on placement and number of participants in official races as well as the difficulty and importance of a race.

Podiums in the IMOCA Globe Series*
Year	First	Second	Third	Ref.
2001	Roland Jourdain (FRA)			
2002	Roland Jourdain (FRA)			
2003	Bernard Stamm (SUI)			
2004	Mike Golding (UK)			
2005	Mike Golding (UK)			
2006	Jean Le Cam (FRA)			
2007	Bernard Stamm (SUI)	Dominique Wavre (SUI)	Jean-Pierre Dick (FRA)	
2008	Armel Le Cléac'h (FRA)	Marc Guillemot (FRA)	Michel Desjoyeaux (FRA)	
2009	Marc Guillemot (FRA)			
2010	Jean-Pierre Dick (FRA)			
2011	Jean-Pierre Dick (FRA)			
2012	François Gabart (FRA)			
2013	François Gabart (FRA)			
2014-2015	Jean Le Cam (FRA)	Bernard Stamm (SUI)	Guillermo Altadill (SPA)	
2016-2017	Armel Le Cléac'h (FRA)	Alex Thomson (GBR)	Jérémie Beyou (FRA)	
2018-2021	Boris Herrmann (GER)	Yannick Bestaven (FRA)	Charlie Dalin (FRA)	
2021	Charlie Dalin (FRA) Paul Meilhat (FRA)	Thomas Ruyant (FRA) Morgan Lagraviere (FRA)	Sébastien Simon (FRA) Yann Eliès (FRA)	
2022	Charlie Dalin (FRA)	Jérémie Beyou (FRA)	Thomas Ruyant (FRA)	
2023	Sam Goodchild (GBR)	Yoann Richomme (FRA)	Jérémie Beyou (FRA)	
*Ocean Masters World Championship before 2018

== IMOCA-Regattas ==
- Rolex Fastnet Race
- Transat Jacques Vabre
- Barcelona World Race
- Route du Rhum
- Vendée Globe

== Presidents ==
- 1991-2002: Christophe Auguin
- 2002-2003: Thierry Dubois
- 2003-2004: Jacques Guilbaud
- 2006-2008: Luc Talbourdet
- 2008-2009: Jacques Guilbaud
- 2009-2010: Dominique Wavre
- 2010-2014: Luc Talbourdet
- 2014-2017: Jean Kerhoas
- Since 2017: Antoine Mermod
