= Sébastien Josse =

French skipper

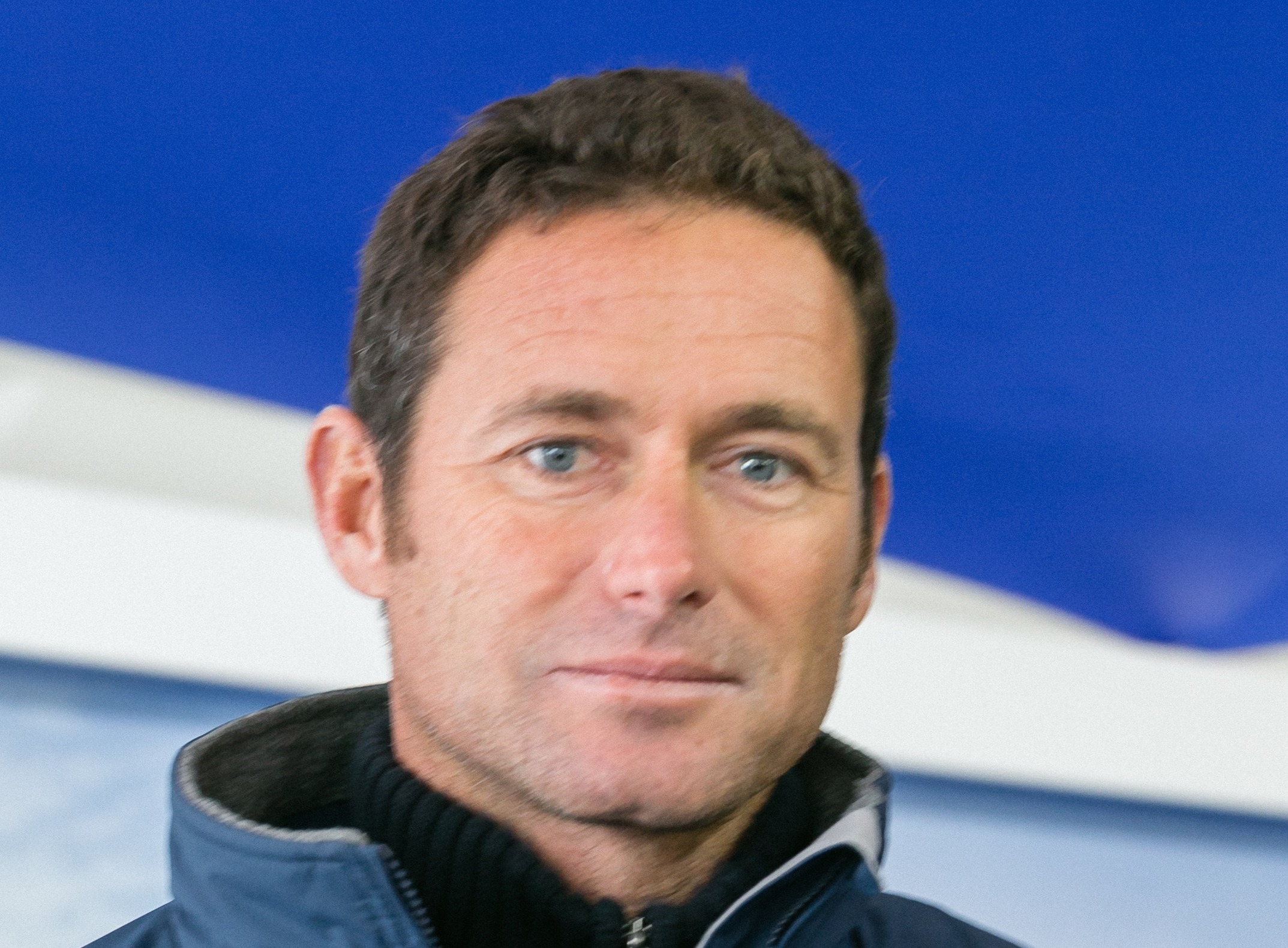

Personal information
- Nationality: French
- Born: 31 March 1975 (age 51) Montereau-Fault-Yonne, France

Sailing career
- Sport: Sailing
- Class(es): IMOCA 60; Ultime Multihulls

Sébastien Josse (born 31 March 1975) is a French professional offshore sailor. He is originally from Nice and lives in the Finistère in Clohars-Carnoet. He was nominated for the World Sailing – World Sailor of the Year Awards in 2006.

== Career highlights ==
Pos	Year	Race	Class	Boat name	Notes	Ref
Round the world races
RET		2016–2017 Vendée Globe	IMOCA 60	Gitana 16		
RET	2008	2008–2009 Vendée Globe	IMOCA 60	BT		
RET	2007	Barcelona World Race	IMOCA 60	PRB 3	with Vincent Riou	
4	2006	Volvo Ocean Race	Volvo Ocean 70	ABN-AMRO TWO	fully crewed	
5	2004	2004–2005 Vendée Globe	IMOCA 60	VMI		
WR	2002	Crewed Round the World Record & Jules Verne Trophy	Maxi Cat	Orange	skippered by Bruno Peyron; 64d 08h 37m 24s	
Transatlantic races
2	2017	Transat Jacques Vabre	Ultime Maxi	Edmond de Rothschild – Gitana 17	with Thomas Rouxel	
1	2013	Transat Jacques-Vabre	MOD70	Edmond de Rothschild Group – Gitana XV	with Charles Caudrelier	
RET	2009	Transat Jacques Vabre	IMOCA 60	BT	with Jean-François Cuzon	
2		Transat New York-Vendée	IMOCA 60	Edmond de Rothschild – Gitana 16		
1		Transat Saint-Barth-Port-la-Forêt	IMOCA 60	Edmond de Rothschild – Gitana 16		
RET	2008	Artemis Transat	IMOCA 60	BT	(leading at the time of abandonment)	
Other significant races
1	2009	Rolex Fastnet Race	IMOCA 60	BT		
1	2007	Rolex Fastnet Race	IMOCA 60	PRB 3	with Vincent Riou	
1	2007	Calais Round Britain Race	IMOCA 60	PRB 3	with Vincent Riou	
World Record		24 hours on a crewed monohull	Monohull	Volvo 70 - ABN-AMRO TWO	(562.96 miles covered)	
8th	2004	Transat	IMOCA 60	VMI		
1st	2003	Rolex Fastnet Race	IMOCA 60	VMI		
5th	2003	Transat Jacques Vabre	IMOCA 60	VMI	with Isabelle Autissier	
2nd	2001	Solitaire du Figaro	Beneteau Figaro			
5th	2001	Solitaire de Course au Large	Beneteau Figaro			
1st	1997	Credit Agricole Hope Challenge				

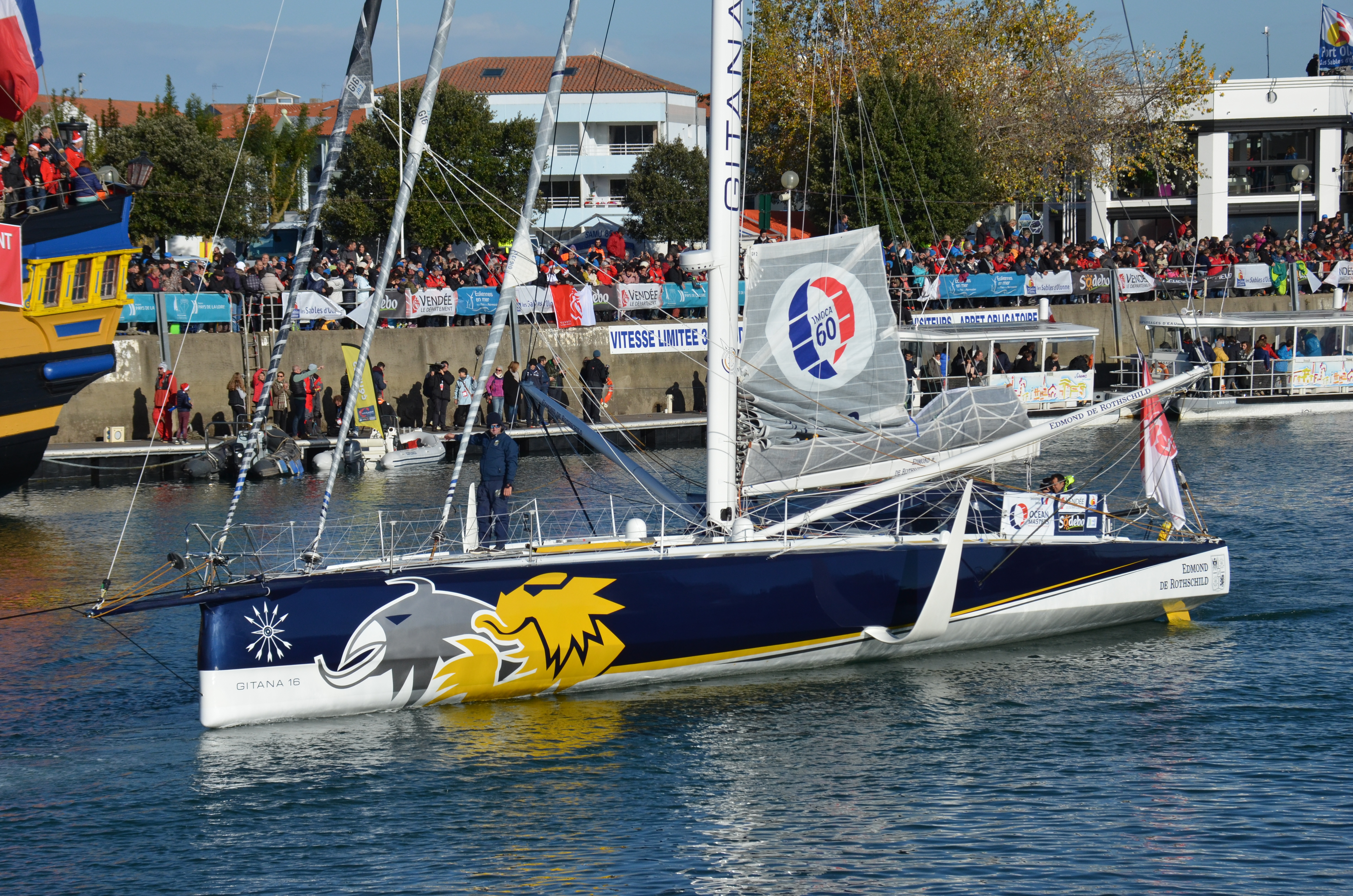

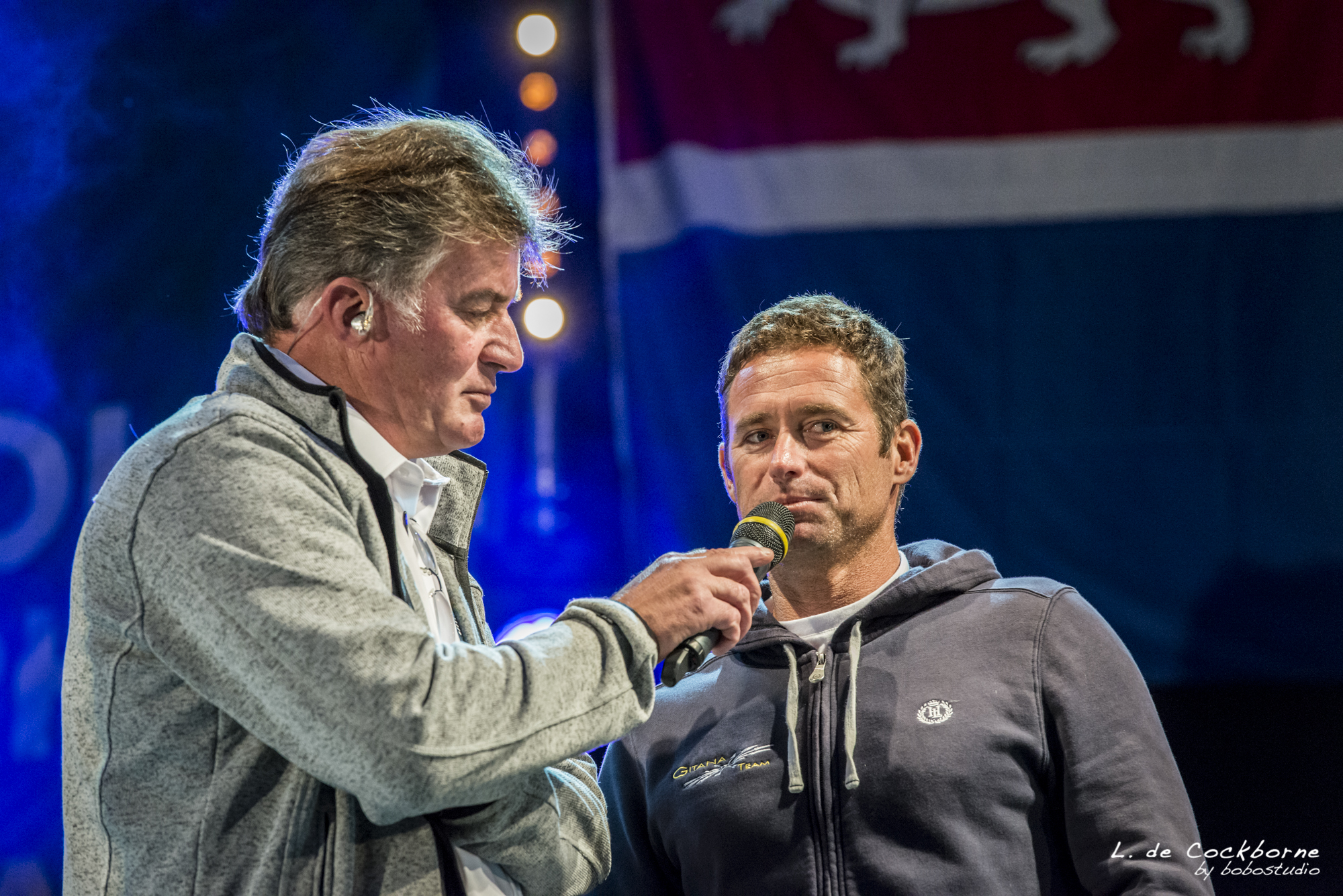
