= Barcelona World Race =

Round-the-world yacht race

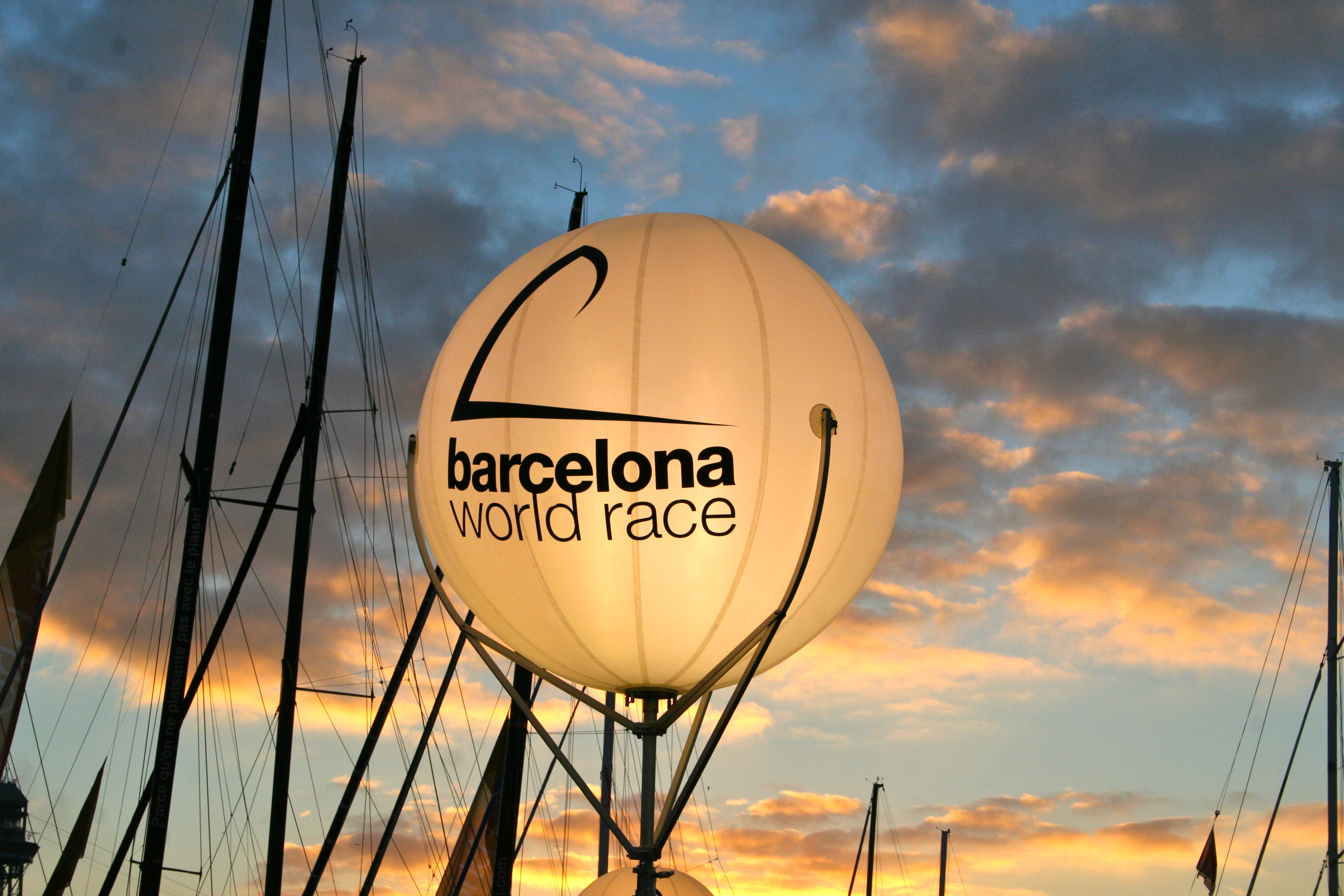
- A BWR balloon at the 2010 pontoon
- First held: 2007
- Type: non-stop double-handed around-the-world race
- Classes: IMOCA 60
- Start: Barcelona
- Finish: Barcelona
- Champions: Bernard Stamm & Jean Le Cam (2014–15)

The Barcelona World Race is a non-stop, round-the-world yacht race for crews of two, sailed on Open 60 IMOCA monohull boats. Following the Clipper route, it starts and finishes in Barcelona, and is organised by the Barcelona Ocean Sailing Foundation (FNOB).

The inaugural race, contested in 2007–08 by nine boats, was won by Jean-Pierre Dick and Damian Foxall on the boat Paprec-Virbac 2 in a time of 92 days.

The second edition of the race started on 31 December 2010 and was won by Jean-Pierre Dick and Loïck Peyron on Virbac-Paprec 3 in a time of 93 days 22 hours 20 minutes 36 seconds.

The third edition of the race started with eight boats on 31 December 2014 and was won by Bernard Stamm and Jean Le Cam on Cheminées Poujoulat in a time of 84 days 5 hours 50 minutes 25 seconds. Guillermo Altadill and José Muñoz finished second on Neutrogena.

The fourth edition of the race was intended to start from Barcelona on 12 January 2019, but on 29 March 2018 the organisers announced that the race had been suspended, due to political instability, citing political and institutional difficulties in Spain. The ongoing crisis in Catalonia had prevented FNOB from being able to make the necessary guarantees to sponsors. They hoped to reorganise the race for 2022-2023. There has been no public statement since.

With the introduction of the IMOCA 60 in the 2023 The Ocean Race a revival of the Barcelona World Race is not expected.

== 1st Edition 2007-2008 ==
=== Results ===
Place	Boat	Skippers	Time	Notes	Ref
1	Paprec Virbac 2	Jean-Pierre Dick (FRA); Damian Foxall (IRL)	92d 09h 49m 49s		
2	Hugo Boss 2	Alex Thomson (GBR); Andrew Cape (AUS)	94d 17h 34m 57s		
3	Temenos II	Dominique Wavre (SUI); Michèle Paret (FRA)	98d 06h 09m 10s		
4	Mutua Madrileña	Javier Sansó (ESP); Pachi Rivero (ESP)	99d 12h 18m 40s		
5	Educación sin Fronteras	Albert Bargués (ESP); Servane Escoffier (FRA)	108 j 18 h 55 min 02 s		
DNF	Veolia Environnement	Roland Jourdain (FRA); Jean-Luc Nélias (FRA)	Abandon on 17 December		
DNF	Estrella Damm	Guillermo Altadill (ESP); Jonathan McKee (USA)	Abandon in 14 December		
DNF	Delta Dore	Jérémie Beyou (FRA); Sidney Gavignet (FRA)	Abandon on 11 December		
DNF	PRB 3	Vincent Riou (FRA); Sébastien Josse (FRA)	Abandon on 8 December : Mast Damage retired to cape town		

== 2nd Edition 2010-2011 ==
=== Results ===
	Team		Arrival Time		
Position	Name of Boat	Date	Date	Time	Average Speed
1	Virbac Paprec 3	Jean-Pierre Dick (FRA); Loïck Peyron (FRA)	4 April 2011	93d 22h 02m 36s	12,9
2	Mapfre	Iker Martínez (ESP); Xabi Fernandez (ESP)	5 April 2011	94d 21h 17m 35s	12,63
3	Renault ZE	Pachi Rivero; Antonio Piris	8 April 2011	97d 18h 47m 36s	
4	Estrella Damm (2)	Alex Pella; Pepe Ribes	9 April 2011	98d 20h 45m 59s	
5	Neutrogena	Boris Herrmann (GER); Ryan Breymaier (USA)	10 April 2011	100d 03h 13m 25s	11,59
6	GAES Centros Auditivos	Dee Caffari (GBR); Anna Corbella (ESP)	13 April 2011	102d 19h 17m 18s	
7	Hugo Boss 3	Wouter Verbraak (NED); Andy Meiklejohn	21 April 2011	111d 10h 49m 23s	10,93
8	Forum Maritim Catala	Gerard Marín; Ludovic Aglaor	22 April 2011	112d 07h 17m 24s	10,63
9	We Are Water	Jaume Mumbrú; Cali Sanmartí	12 May 2011	132d 04h 58m 32s	9,54
Abandon	Mirabaud	Dominique Wavre (SUI); Michèle Paret			
Abandon	Groupe Bel	Kito de Pavant; Sébastien Audigane			
Abandon	Central Lechera Asturiana	Juan Merediz; Fran Palacio			
Abandon	Foncia 2	Michel Desjoyeaux (FRA); François Gabart (FRA)			
Abandon	Président	Jean Le Cam (FRA); Bruno Garcia (POR)			

== 3rd Edition 2014-2015 ==
=== Results ===
	Team		Arrival Time		
Position	Name of Boat	Date	Date	Time	Average Speed
1	Cheminées Poujoulat	Bernard Stamm (FRA); Jean Le Cam (FRA)	25 March 2015	84d 05h 50 min 25 s	13,82
2	Neutrogena	Guillermo Altadill (ESP); Jose Muñoz	31 March 2015	89d 11h 47m 00s	12,94
3	GAES Centros Auditivos	Anna Corbella (ESP); Gerard Marín	1 April 2015	91d 05h 09m 28s	12,85
4	One Planet, One Ocean & Pharmaton	Alex Gelabert; Didac Costa (ESP)	8 April 2015	98d 09h 12m 09s	11,77
5	We are water (2)	Bruno Garcia (POR); Willy Garcia	9 April 2015	99d 03h 06m 28s	9,80
6	Renault Captur	Jörg Riechers; Sebastien Audigane	16 April 2015	105d 23h 35m 22 s	9,17
7	Spirit of Hungary	Nándor Fa (HUN); Conrad Colman (NZL)	21 April 2015	110d 10h 59m 40s	8,80
Abandon	Hugo Boss (5)	Alex Thomson; Pepe Ribes			
