= IMOCA 60 Paprec 2 =

Sailboat

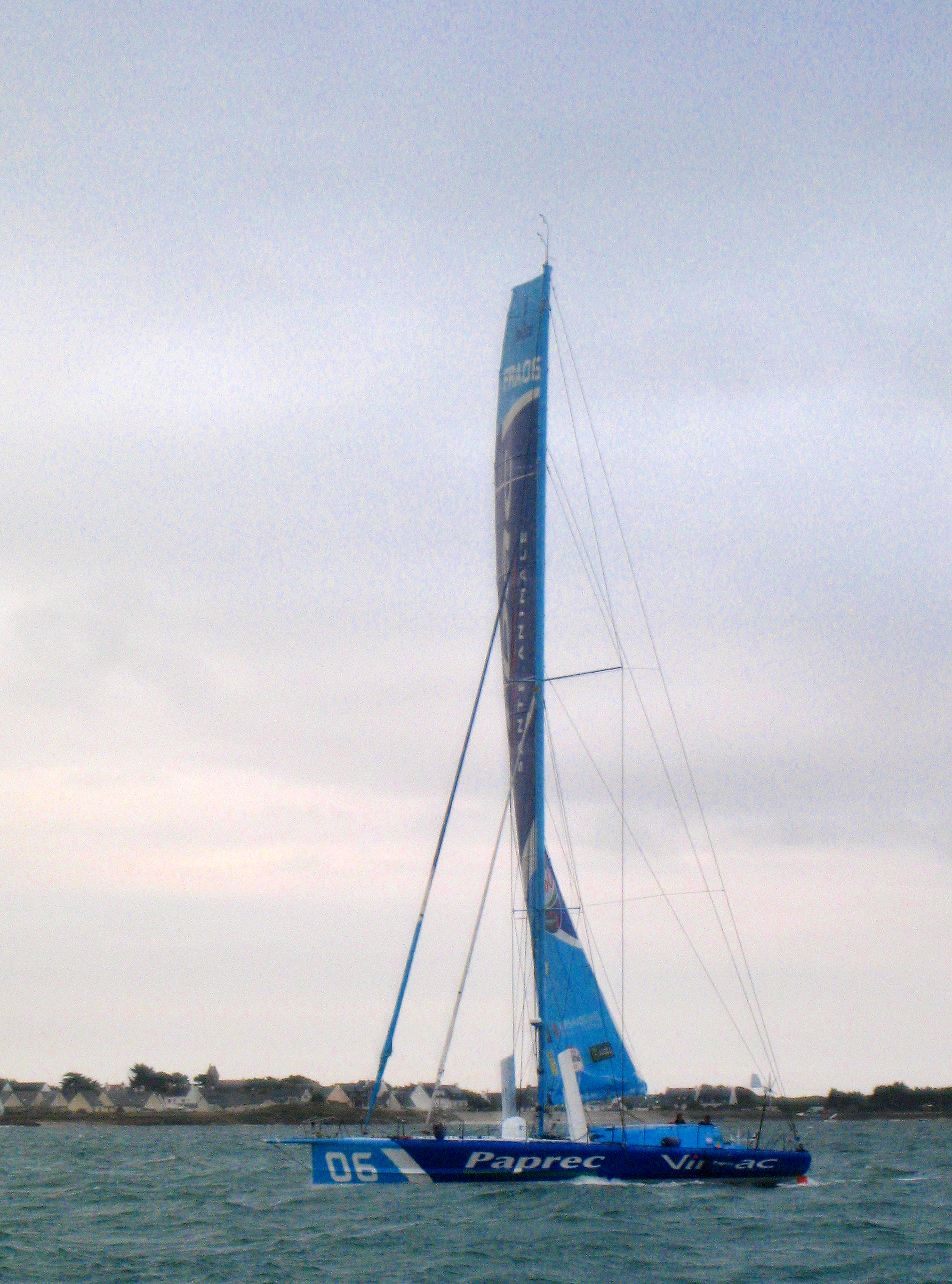

Development
- Designer: Farr Yacht Design
- Year: 4 February 2007
- Builder: Southern Ocean Marine (NZL)

Hull appendages
- Keel: Canting Keel
- Rudder: Twin Rudders

Racing
- Class association: IMOCA 60

The IMOCA 60 class yacht Paprec-Virbac 2 was designed by Farr Yacht Design, assembled by Southern Ocean Marine based in New Zealand and then shipped to France where it was launched in 2007. The boat is a sister ship to Gitana 80, also built by the same builder from the same moulds.

== Names and ownership ==
Paprec-Virbac 2 (2007-2009)

- Skipper: Jean-Pierre Dick

W Hotels (2009)

- Skipper: Alex Pella

Estrella Damm (2) (2010-2011)

- Skipper: Alex Pella and Pepe Ribes

We Are Water (2014-2015)

- Skipper: Bruno Garcia and Willy Garcial

Le Bateau des Métiers by Aerocampus (2015)

- Skipper: Arnaud Boissières

La Mie Câline (2015-2017)

- Skipper: Arnaud Boissières

La Mie Câline – Artipôle (2017)

- Skipper: Manuel Cousin and Arnaud Boissières

Groupe Sétin (2017-2022)

- Skipper: Manuel Cousin

Coup de Pouce (since 2023)

- Skipper: Manuel Cousin
- Sail No.: FRA 71

== Racing results ==
Pos	Year	Race	Class	Boat name	Skipper	Notes	Ref
Round the world races
23 / 33	2021	2020–2021 Vendée Globe	IMOCA 60	Groupe Setin, FRA 71	Manuel Cousin (FRA)	103d 18h 15m 40s	
10 / 29	2017	2016–2017 Vendée Globe	IMOCA 60	La Mie Câline, FRA 14	Arnaud Boissières (FRA)	102d 20h 24m 09s	
5 / 8	2015	Barcelona World Race	IMOCA 60	We Are Water, ESP 240	Bruno Garcia (ESP); Willy Garcial (ESP)	99d 03h 06m	
4 / 14	2010	Barcelona World Race	IMOCA 60	Estrella Damm (2), ESP 1876	Pepe Ribes (ESP); Alex Pella (ESP)	98d 20h 46m	
DNF / 30	2009	2008–2009 Vendée Globe	IMOCA 60	Paprec-Virbac (2)	Jean-Pierre Dick (FRA)		
1 / 9	2008	Barcelona World Race	IMOCA 60	Paprec-Virbac (2)	Jean-Pierre Dick (FRA); Damien Foxall (IRL)	92d 09h 50m	
Transatlantic Races
Other Races
