= Open 50 =

Sailing yacht

The Open 50 is a type of monohull sailing yacht and former ISAF international class. It is also known as the IMOCA 50, due to its origin in the International Monohull Open Classes Association.

== See also ==
- Open 60
