= IMOCA 60 Ecover 2 =

Sailboat

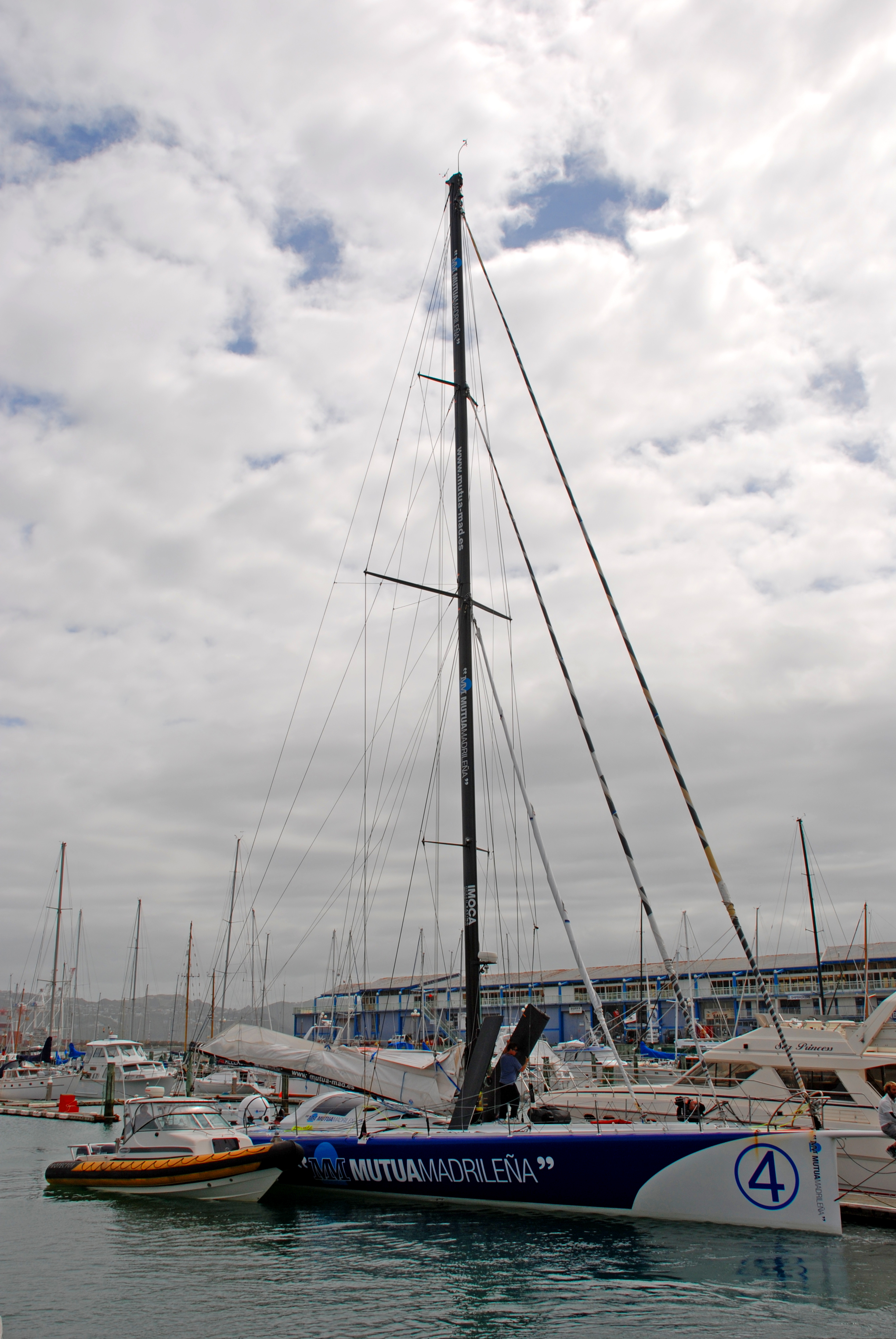

Development
- Designer: Owen Clarke Design, Mervyn Owen, Allen Clarke
- Builder: Southern Ocean Marine (NZL)

Racing
- Class association: IMOCA 60

The IMOCA 60 class yacht Ecover 2, GBR 3 was designed by Owen Clark Design, built by Southern Ocean Marine in New Zealand, and launched in 2003.

== Racing results ==
Pos	Year	Race	Class	Boat name	Skipper	Notes	Ref
Round the world races
RET	2011	2010–2011 Barcelona World Race	IMOCA 60	Central Lechera Asturiana, ESP 23	Fran PALACIO (ESP); Juan MEREDIZ (FRA)	Dismasted	
4 / 9	2008	2007–2008 Barcelona World Race	IMOCA 60	Mutua Madrileña	Pachi Rivero (ESP); Javier Sanso (FRA)	99d 12h 18m	
DNF / 7	2006	Velux 5 Oceans Race	IMOCA 60	Ecover 2	Mike Golding (GBR)	Mast Damage retired unaided to cape town	
3 / 20	2004	2004–2005 Vendée Globe	IMOCA 60	Ecover 2	Mike Golding (GBR)	88d 00h 15m had keel failure near finish	
Transatlantic Races
Other Races
