= Guillermo Altadill =

Spanish yachtsman

Guillermo Altadill (born 15 June 1962 in Barcelona) is a Spanish yachtsman. His sailing career includes participation in the Barcelona World Race, 18 Atlantic crossings, six circumnavigations, and over 300,000 competitive miles. He has competed in two Volvo Ocean Races (2001–02 with Assa Abloy and 2005–06 with Ericsson) and two Whitbread Round the World Races. He was also a crew member aboard the maxi-catamaran Cheyenne when it set the Jules Verne record for the fastest circumnavigation with crew.

Altadill specializes in big ocean boats but has also achieved success in smaller classes like Laser dinghies and Olympic classes. He was the Spanish champion in Soling and Tornado and trained the Tornado Gold medalist at the 1996 Summer Olympics in Atlanta.
