= Jean-Pierre Dick =

French skipper and navigator

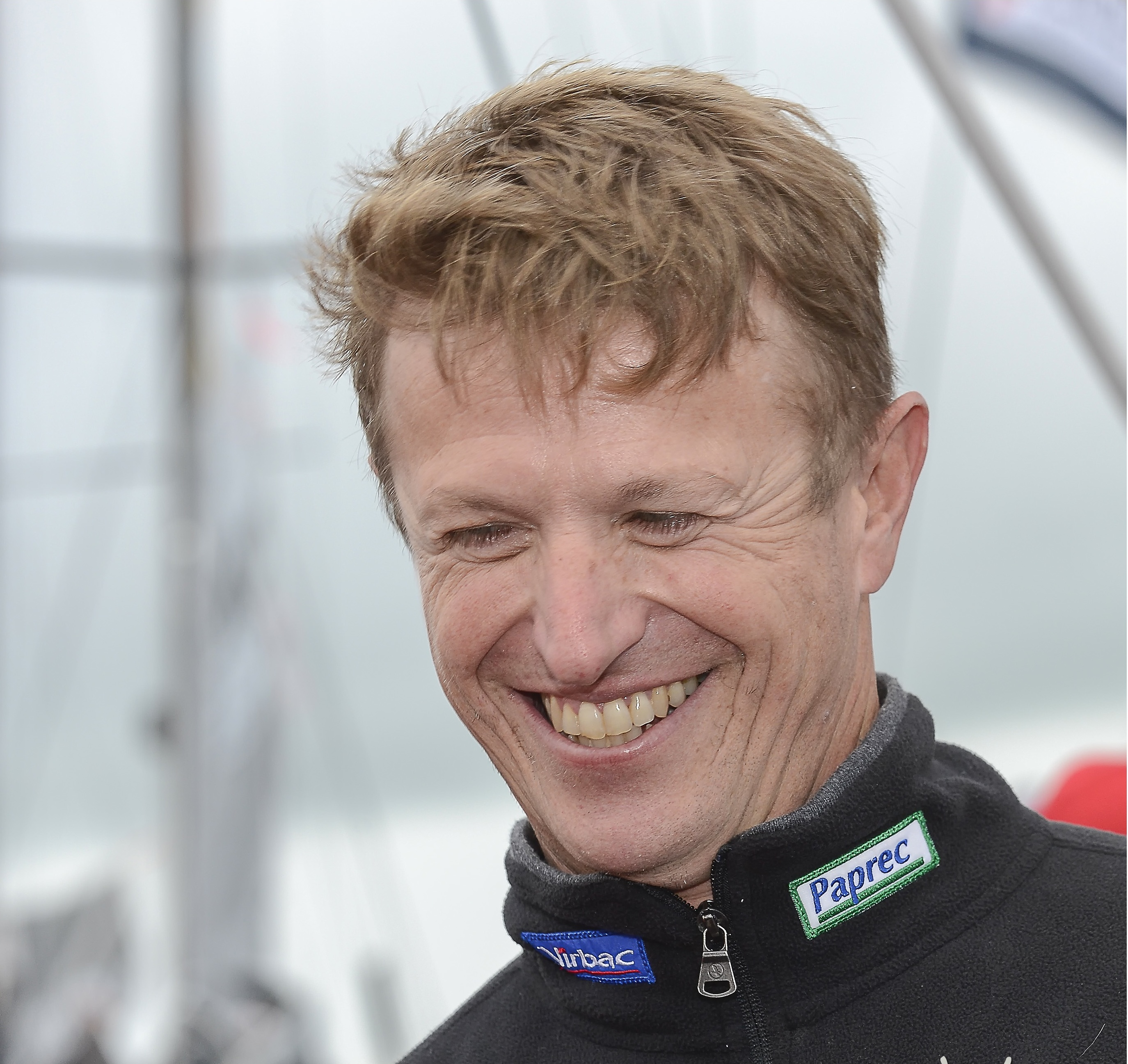

Personal information
- Nationality: French
- Born: 8 October 1965 (age 59); Nice, France

Sailing career
- Class: IMOCA 60

Jean-Pierre Dick (born 8 October 1965 in Nice) is a French professional yachtsman.

== Biography ==
Jean-Pierre Dick is the third of four children of Pierre-Richard Dick, the founder of Virbac Laboratories. He is trained as a veterinary doctor but his passion is for the sea and he has been offshore racing since 1989.

== Sailing career ==
His professional sailing career has been focused on offshore sailing. He has had most success in double-handed sailing, including wins in Transat Jacques Vabre in 2003, 2005, 2011 and 2017 and the Barcelona World Race in 2008 and 2011.

He has competed in the solo round the world Vendée Globe four times, finishing in three of those races, with a best position of 4th. It was in the 2012 Vendee Globe that, having long been in the top three, the boat lost its keel between the Cape Verde Islands and the Azores, dashing all hope of a podium finish, but he managed a feat of seamanship to finish the race by covering 2,643 miles without a keel.

In 2014 he embarked on a new world tour project: St Michel-Virbac, the name of the new boat of the Azure skipper designed by Verdier / VPLP. St Michel-Virbac competed in the IMOCA Ocean Masters Championships from 2015 to 2017, culminating in the 2016–2017 Vendée Globe, of which he takes fourth place, before following a fourth victory at the end of 2017 on the Transat Jacques Vabre, with Yann Eliès, who became the helm of virbac, confident his desire to "move on". With his company Absolute Dreamer, he is developing a new flying boat the ETF26, creating a new circuit. He also campaigned a MOD 70 trimaran which he capsized during training.

== Race Result Highlights ==
=== Round the World Races ===
4th 2016–2017 Vendée Globe
4th 2012–2013 Vendée Globe
RET 2008–2009 Vendée Globe following a collision with a growler off the coast of New Zealand.
6th 2004–2005 Vendée Globe
1st 2011 Barcelona World Race with Loïck Peyron on Virbac Paprec 3
1st 2008 Barcelona World Race with Damian Foxall

=== Other IMOCA 60 Events ===
1st – 2017 Transat Jacques Vabre with Yann Eliès (FRA) (onboard IMOCA 60 – st Michel-Virbac)
1st – 2011 Transat Jacques Vabre with Jérémie Beyou (FRA) (onboard IMOCA 60 – Paprec Virbac 3)
1st – 2005 Transat Jacques Vabre with Loïck Peyron (FRA) (onboard IMOCA 60 – )
1st – 2003 Transat Jacques Vabre with Nicolas Abiven (FRA) (onboard IMOCA 60 – )

3rd – 2006 Route du Rhum
4th – 2010 Route du Rhum

2nd – 2005 Rolex Fastnet Race – IMOCA 60 Class
3rd – 2005 Calais Round Britain Race

=== Other Event ===
1st 2020 Atlantic Rally for Cruiser – Racing Division done two handed with Fabrice Renouard
1st 2019 Atlantic Rally for Cruiser – Racing Division
1st 2018 Atlantic Rally for Cruiser – Racing Division
1st 2001 Tour de France à la voile – Farr 30
1st 1992 Tour de France à la voile with Jimmy Pahun – JOD 35

1st 2001 Spi Ouest France
1st 1995 Spi Ouest France
1st 1994 Spi Ouest France
1st 1992 Spi Ouest France
1st 1989 Spi Ouest France

== Gallery ==
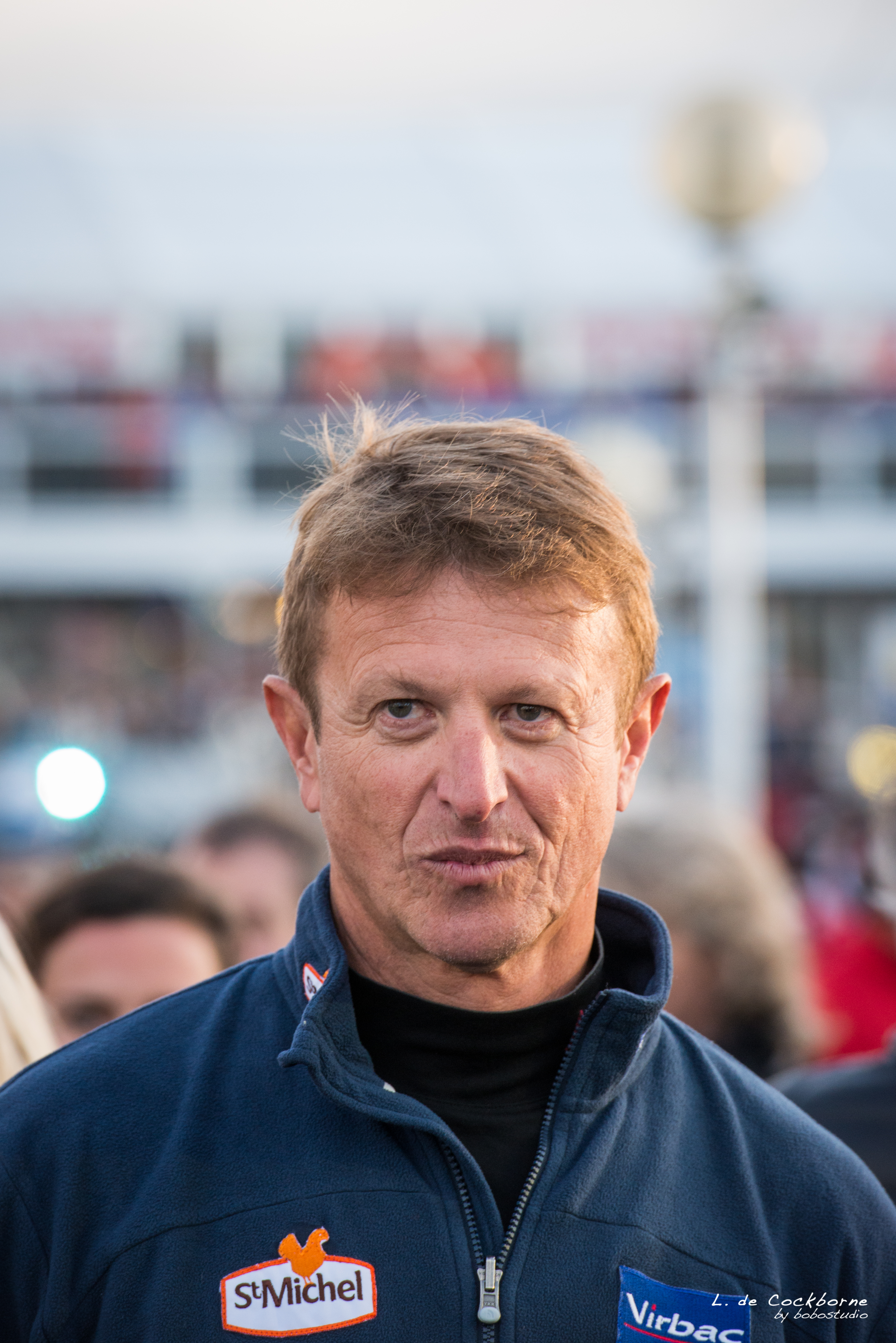
2016 Vendee Globe Start

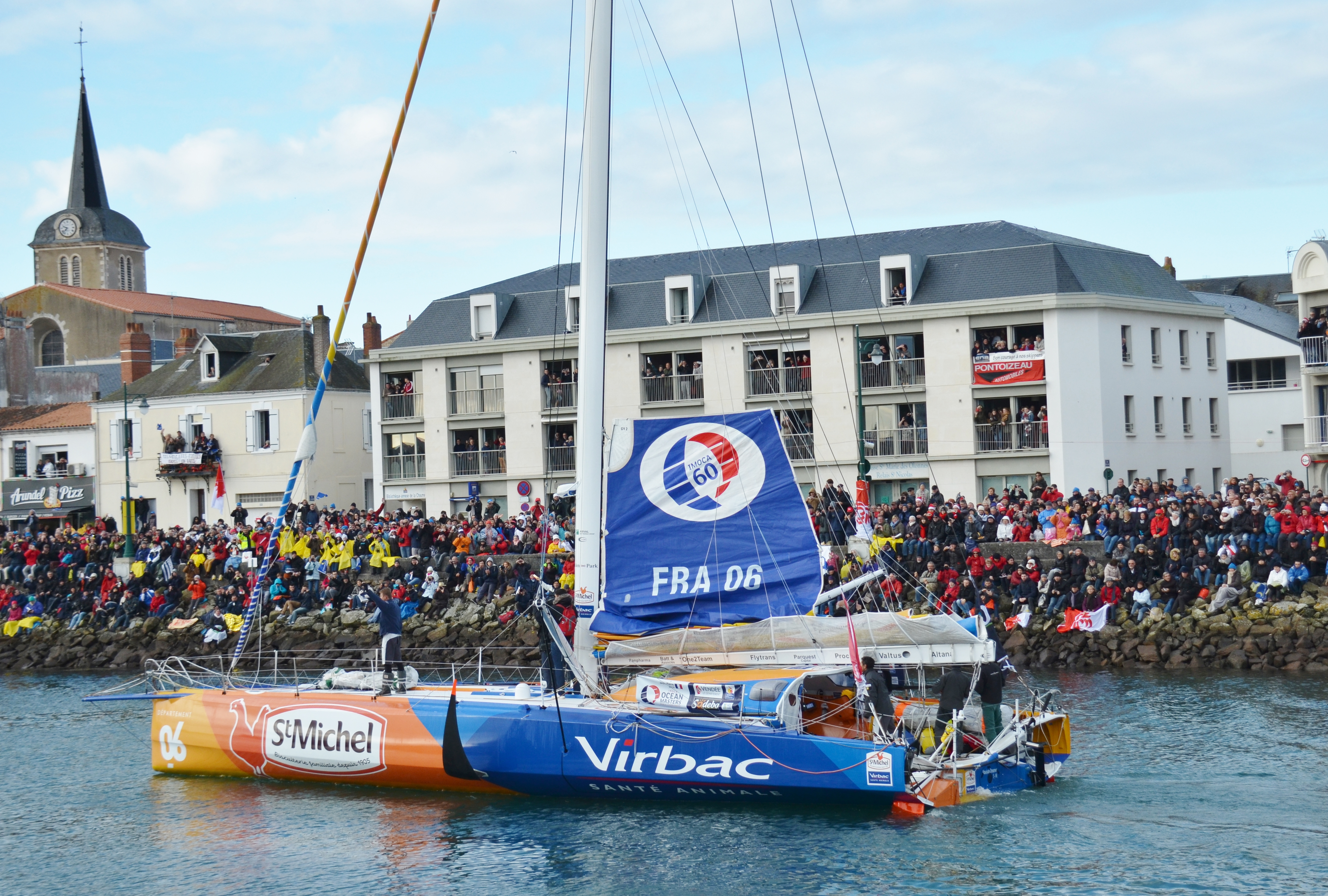
2016 Vendee Globe Start

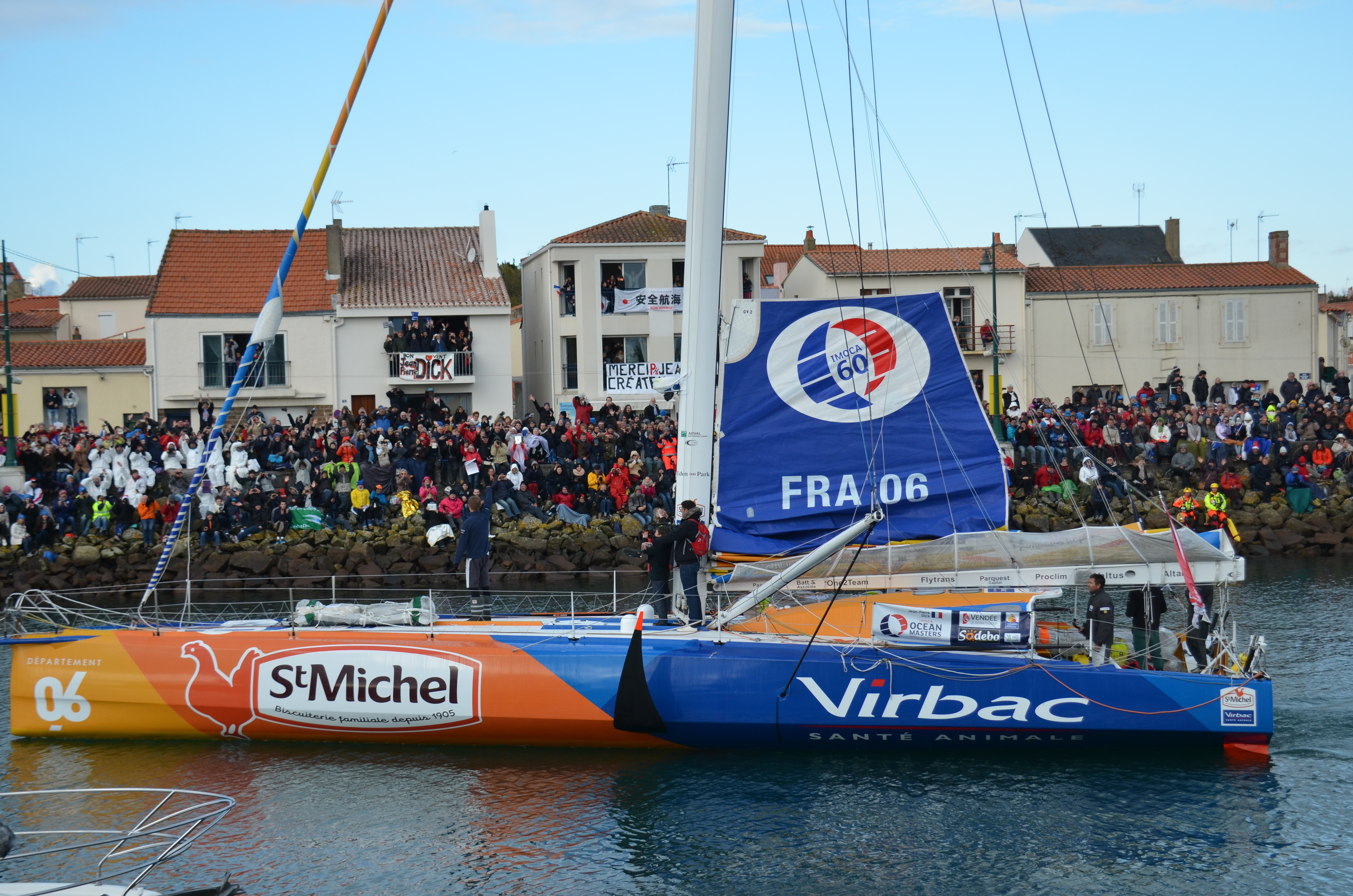
2016 Vendee Globe Start

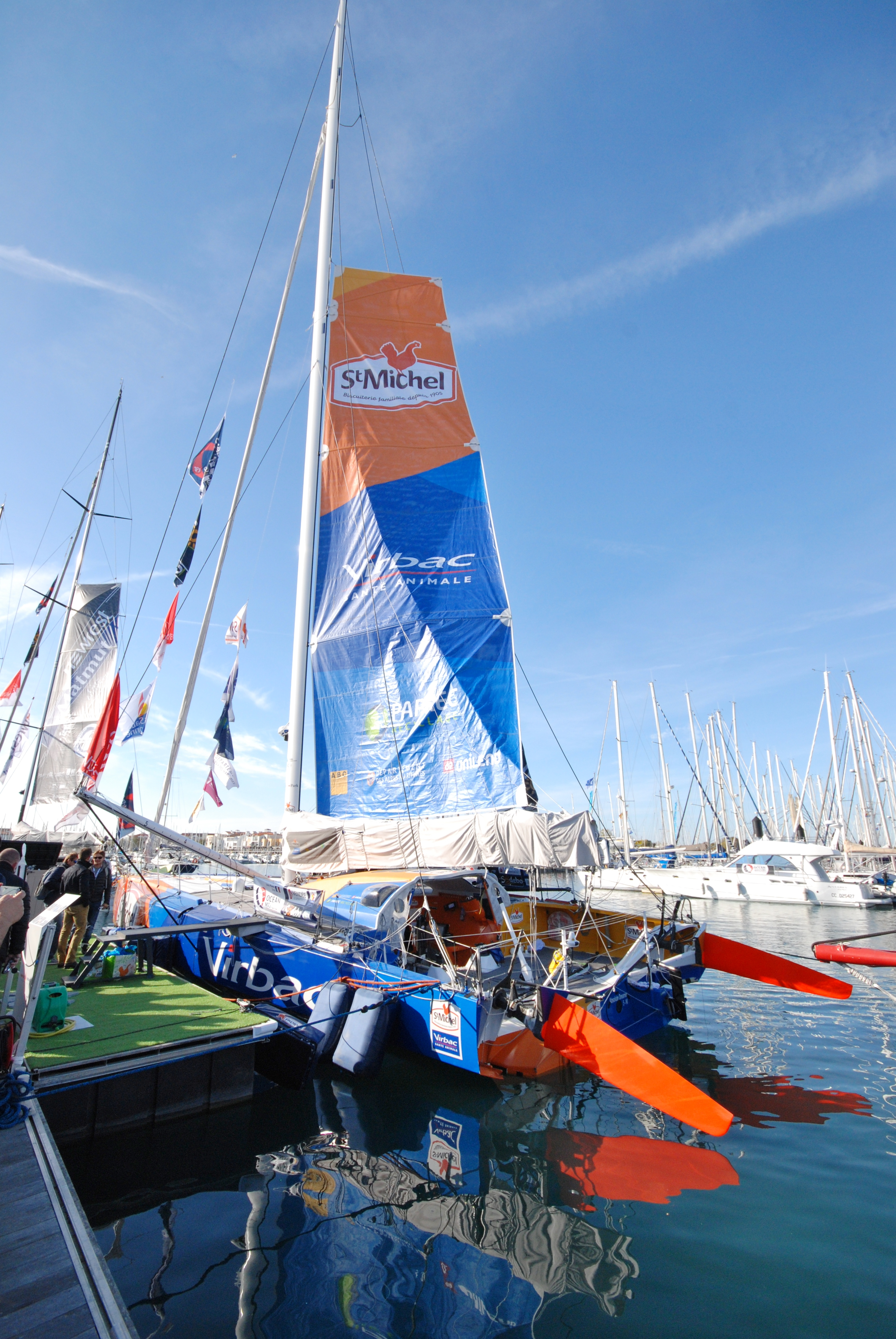
2016 Vendee Globe Start

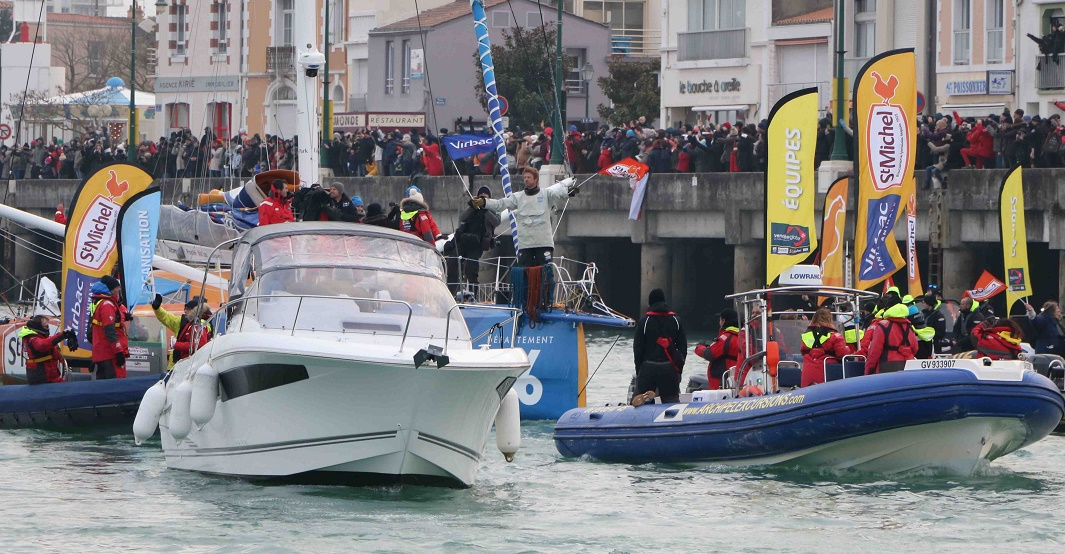
2016 Vendee Globe Start

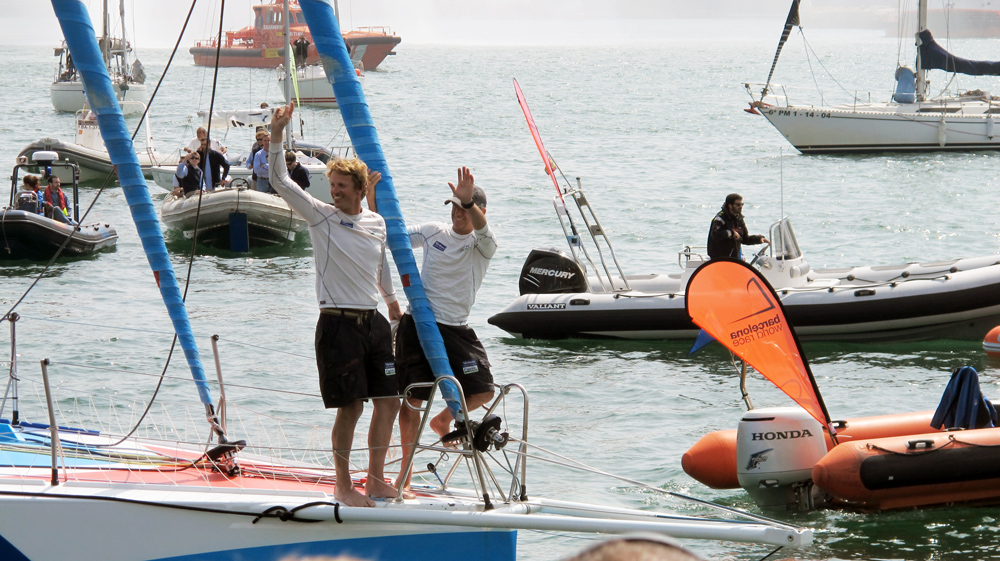
2016 Vendee Globe Start

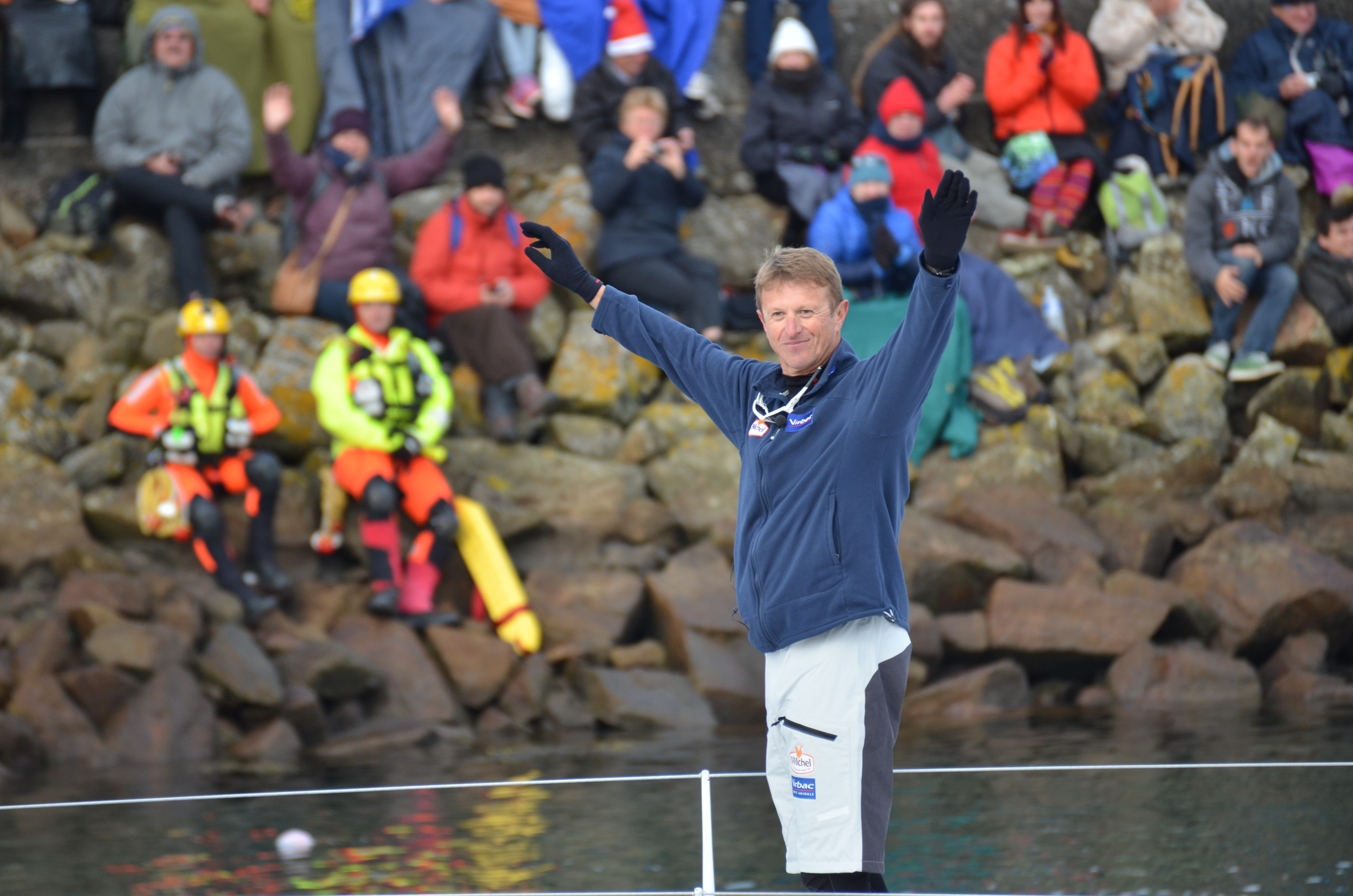
2016 Vendee Globe Start

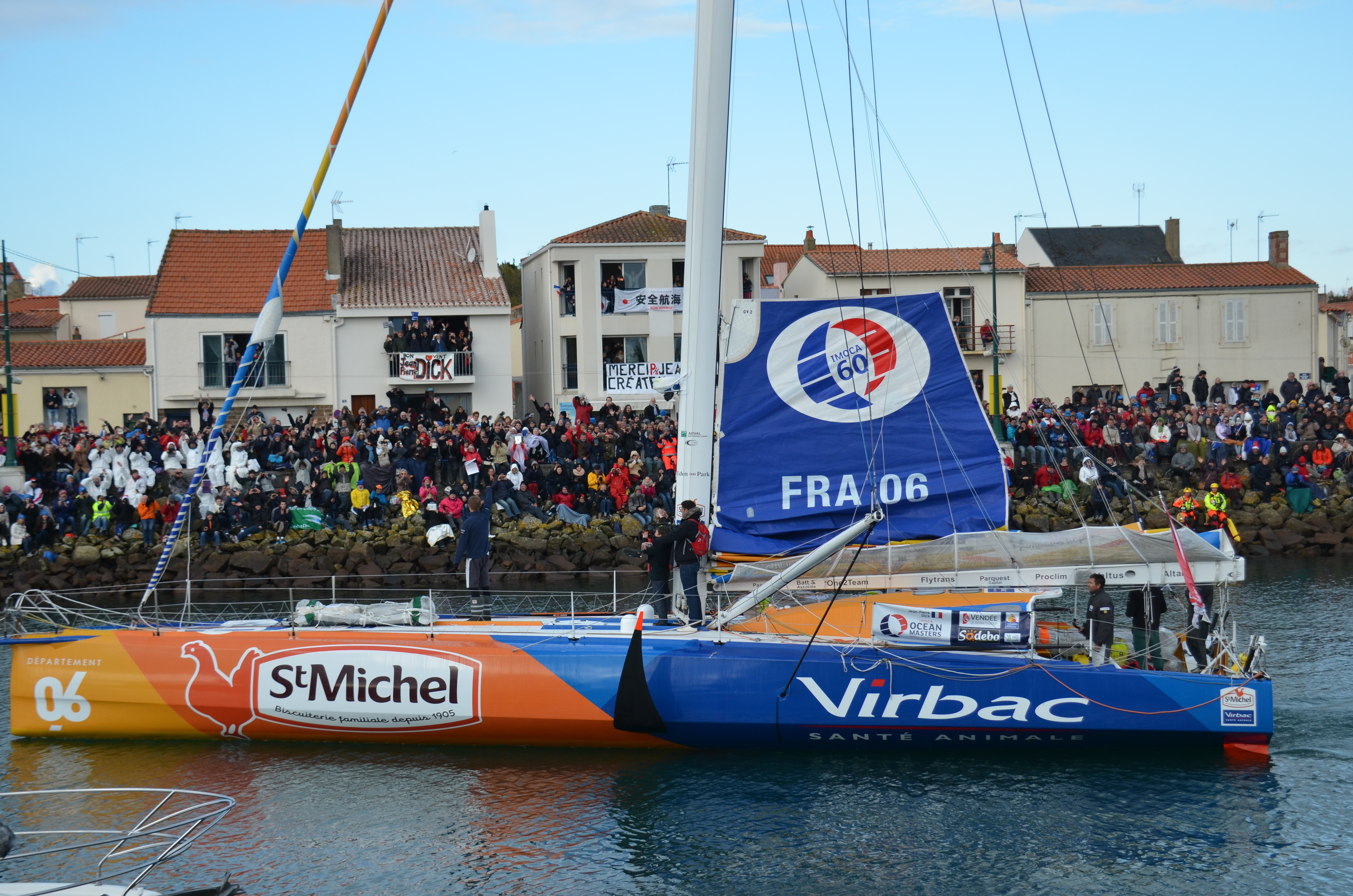
2016 Vendee Globe Start

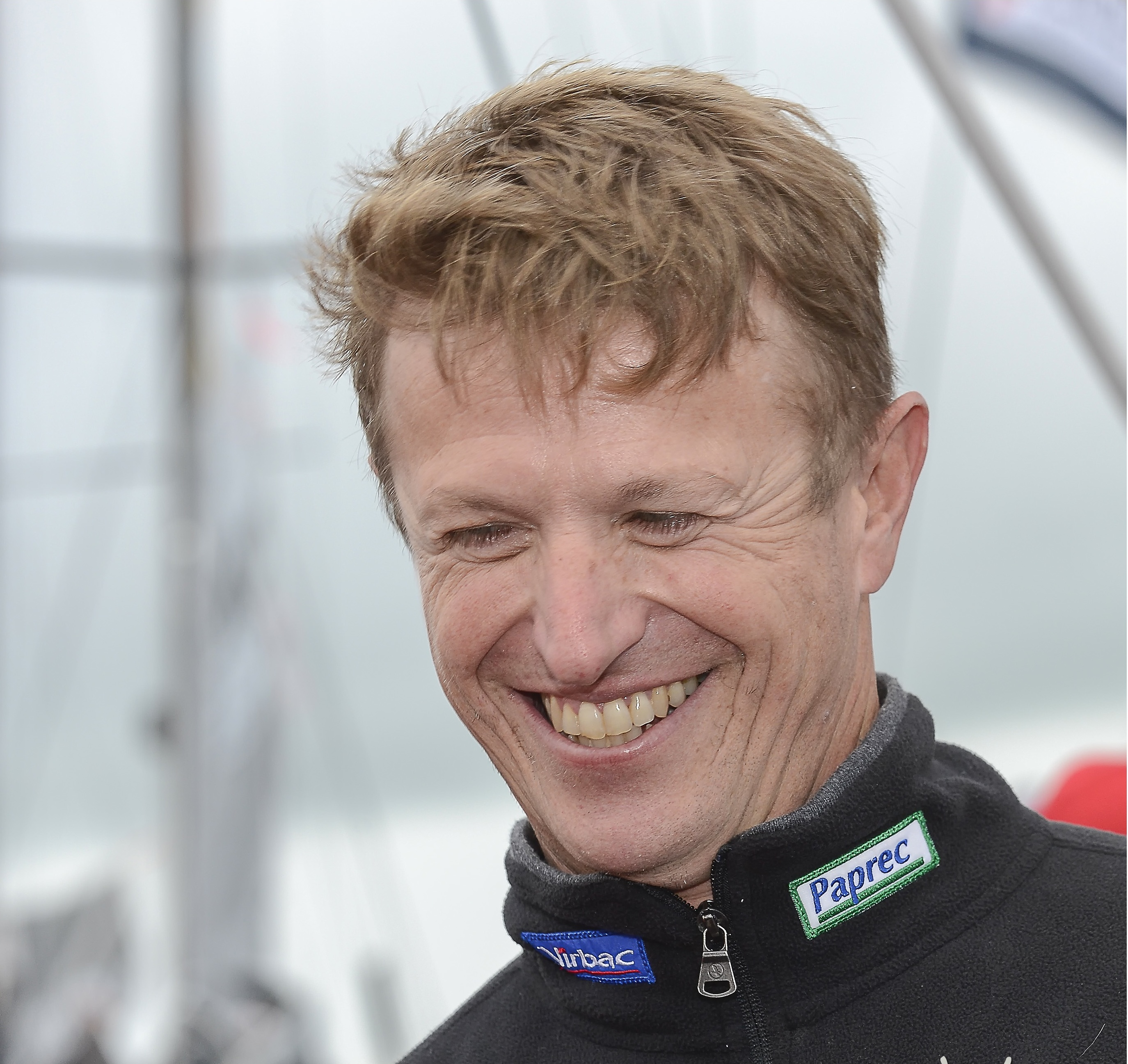
2012 Vendee Globe Start

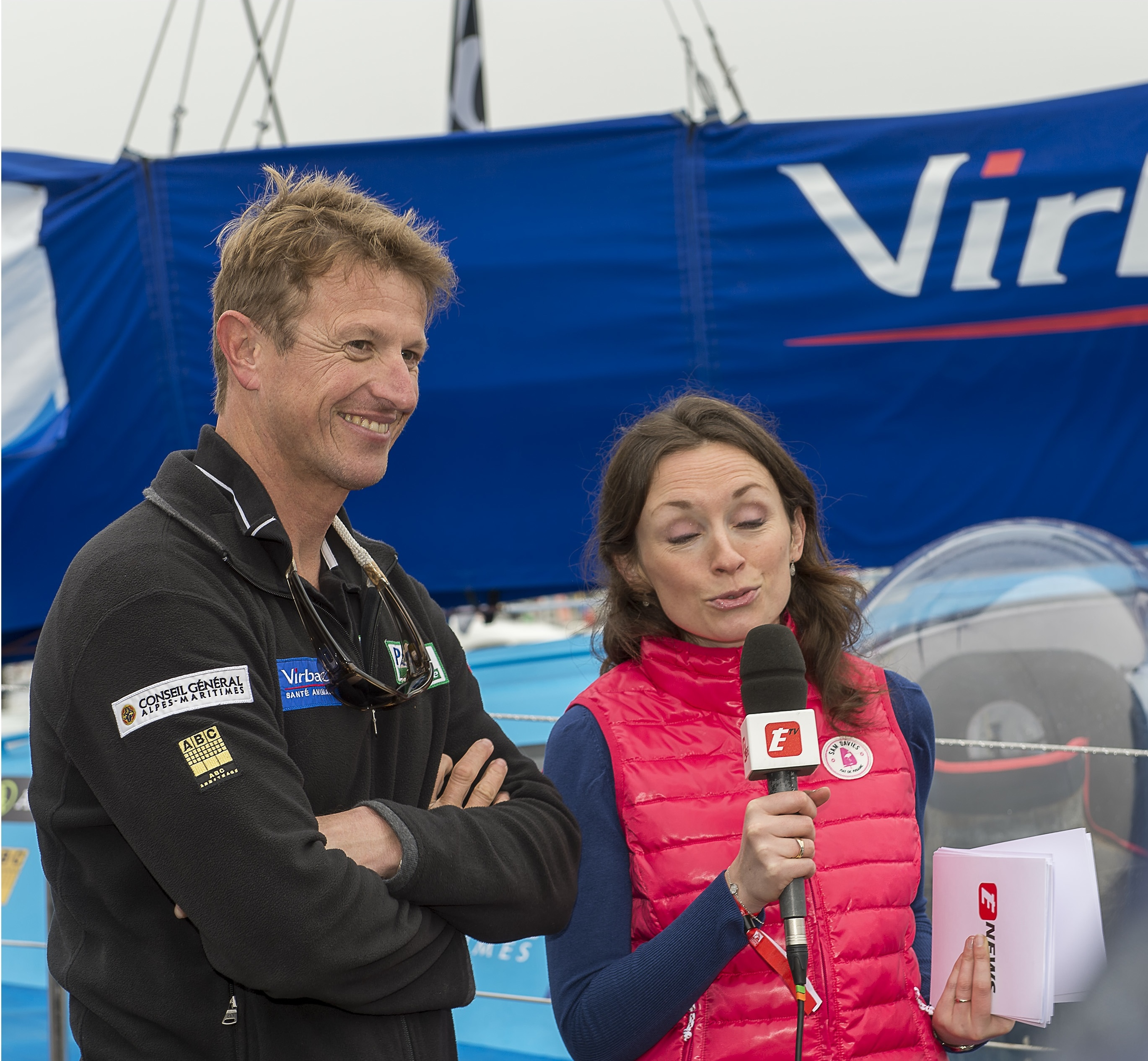
2012 Vendee Globe Start

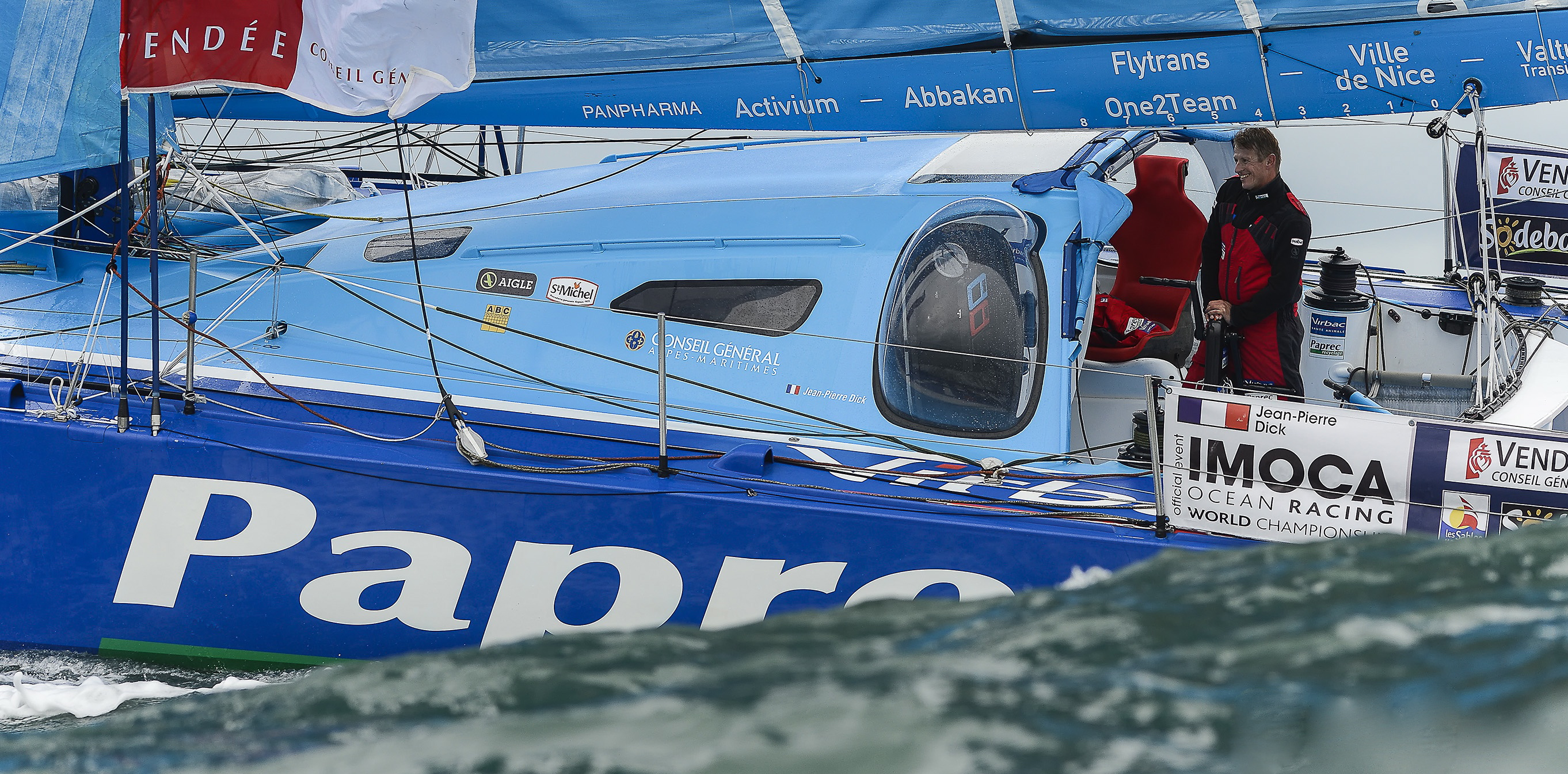
2012 Vendee Globe Start

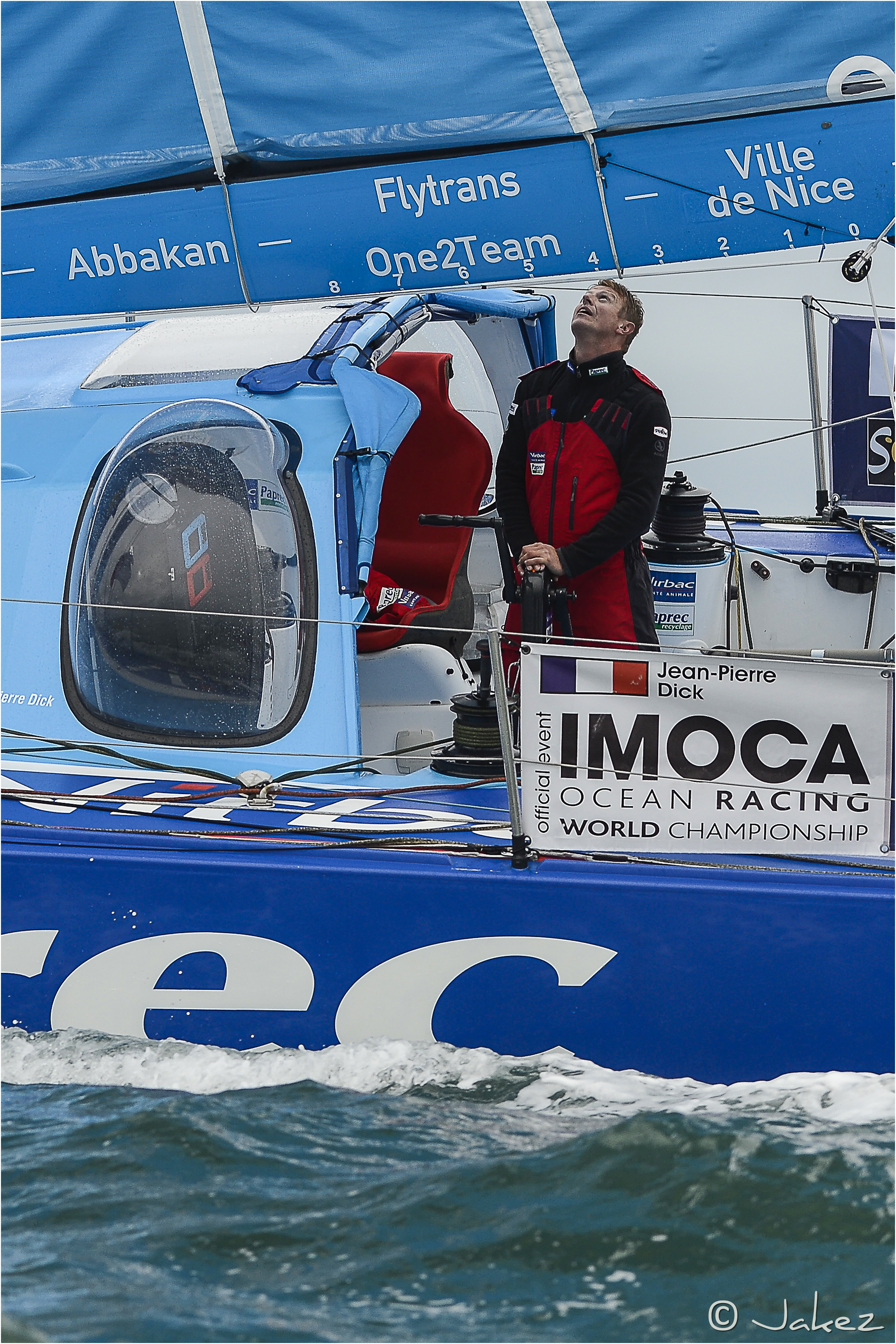
2012 Vendee Globe Start

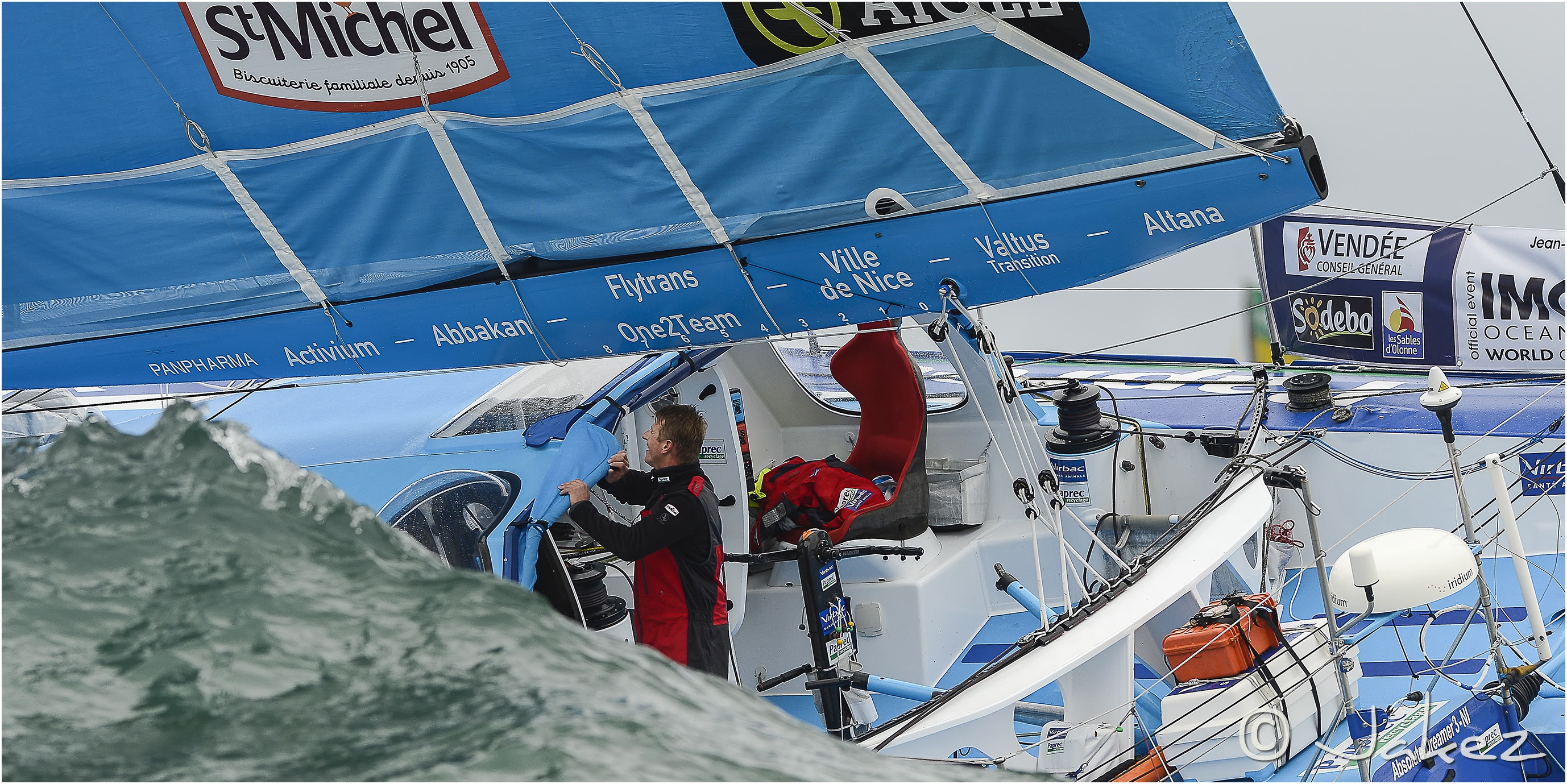
2012 Vendee Globe Start
