= Retour à la base =

- First held: 2007; 2023 (under current name and organizer)
- Type: single-handed off-shore race
- Classes: IMOCA
- Start: Martinique
- Finish: Lorient
- Website: https://retouralabase.com/en

The Retour à la base, formerly Transat B to B (short for "back to Brittany") is a transatlantic single-handed yacht race exclusive to IMOCA 60 yachts, which first took place in 2007. It was introduced as a return race from destination of the Transat Jacques Vabre to Brittany, Metropolitan France, home to most IMOCA teams.

Since its introduction it was held every four years in the year before the Vendée Globe except 2019.

A crewed edition was planned for 2021 but was cancelled later.

== History ==
Year	Name	Parcours	Distance	Winner	Time
2007	Transat Ecover B to B	Salvador de Bahia – Port-la-Forêt	4 200	Loick Peyron (FRA)	14d 9h 13m 25s
2011	Transat B to B	Saint-Barthélemy – au large de Espagne		François Gabart (FRA)	9d 9h 11m 30s
2015	Transat Saint Barth-Port la Forêt	Saint-Barthélemy – Port-la-Forêt	3 400	Sébastien Josse (FRA)	10d 5h 18m 17s
2023	Retour à la Base	Fort-de-France – Lorient	3 500	Yoann Richomme (FRA)	9d 0h 03m 48s

== 2007 edition ==
List of 2007 participants
Pos.	Skipper	Boat	Time
1	Loick Peyron (FRA)	Gitana Eighty	14d 09h 13m 25s
2	Kito De Pavant (FRA)	Groupe Bel	14d 12h 22m 49s
3	Michel Desjoyeaux (FRA)	Foncia (1)	14d 13h 43m 24s
4	Yann Elies (FRA)	Generali	14d 19h 22m 02s
5	Marc Guillemot (FRA)	Safran (2)	15d 08h 25m 44s
6	Bernard Stamm (SUI)	Cheminées Poujoulat (3)	15d 16h 24m 34s
7	Samantha Davies (GBR)	Roxy	17d 17h 38m 46s
8	Yannick Bestaven (FRA)	Cervin EnR	18d 00h 57m 48s
9	Arnaud Boissières (FRA)	Akena Vérandas	19d 00h 57m 26s
10	Jean-Baptiste Dejeanty (FRA)	Maisonneuve	20d 06h 21m 45s
11	Rich Wilson (USA)	Great American III	21d 23h 22m 34s
12	Derek Hatfield (CAN)	Spirit of Canada	22d 02h 20m 21s
DNF	Dee Caffari (GBR)	Aviva 111	demasted
DNF	Mike Golding (GBR)	Ecover III	issues with electronics
DNF	Armel Le Cléac'h (FRA)	Brit Air	demasted

== 2011 edition ==
List of 2011 participants
Pos.	Skipper	Boat	Time
1	François Gabart (FRA)	MACIF	9j 09h 11min 30s
2	Armel Le Cleac'h (FRA)	Banque Populaire VI	9j 13h 08min 10s
3	Vincent Riou (FRA)	PRB 4	9j 15h 30min 20s
4	Mike Golding (GBR)	Gamesa	9j 18h 58min 00s
4	Alex Thomson (GBR)	Hugo Boss 4	10j 01h 43min 00s
5	Marc Guillemot (FRA)	Safran 2	9j 21h 33min 00s
6	Jean-Pierre Dick (FRA)	Virbac Paprec 3	11j 06h 55min 00s
7	Louis Burton (FRA)	Bureau Vallée (1)	11j 19h 25min 00s

== 2015 edition ==
List of 2015 participants
Pos.	Skipper	Boat	Time
1	Sébastien Josse (FRA)	Edmond de Rothschild	10d 05h 18m 17s
2	Fabrice Amedeo (FRA)	Newrest – Matmut	12d 23h 57m 42s
3	Enda O'Coineen (IRE)	Currency House Kilcullen	13d 22h 19m 55s
4	Morgan Lagraviere (FRA)	Safran (3)	16d 13h 32m 02s
DNF	Paul Meilhat (FRA)	SMA	
DNF	Eric Holden (CAN)	O CANADA	
DNF	Thomas Ruyant (FRA)	Le Souffle du Nord	

== 2023 edition ==
The course is between Fort-de-France, Martinique, overseas France and Lorient, Brittany, Metropolitan France. It was held as a qualification race for the 2024–2025 Vendée Globe following the Transat Jacques Vabre in the 2023 IMOCA 60 race calendar.

32 skippers started the race. For several skippers it was the first solo race in an IMOCA 60, among others Sam Goodchild, Yoann Richomme, Violette Dorange and Nico Lunven. Several skippers who announced to compete had to cancel their participation due to damages taken during the 2023 Transat Jacques Vabre or illness. Most notably reining Vendée Globe winner Yannick Bestaven and Charlie Dalin.

The race start was on 30 November 2023. Tanguy Le Turquais and Jean Le Cam started several days later.

List of 2023 participants
Pos.	Skipper	Boat			Finishing time (UTC+1)	Elapsed time	Ref.
Pos.	Skipper	Sail No.	Boat name	Year	Finishing time (UTC+1)	Elapsed time	Ref.
1	Yoann Richomme (FRA)	FRA 24	Paprec Arkéa	2023	09/12/2023 17:03:48	9d 00h 03m 48s	
2	Jérémie Beyou (FRA)	FRA 3	Charal (2)	2022	09/12/2023 22:53:31	9d 05h 53m 31s	
3	Sam Goodchild (GBR)	FRA 100	For the Planet	2019	10/12/2023 00:43:21	9d 07h 43m 21s	
4	Boris Herrmann (GER)	MON 1297	Malizia – Seaexplorer	2022	10/12/2023 13:02:41	9d 20h 02m 41s	
5	Damien Seguin (FRA)	FRA 13	Groupe Apicil	2015	10/12/2023 15:55:53	9d 22h 55m 53s	
6	Sam Davies (GBR)	FRA 109	Initiative Coeur 4	2022	10/12/2023 17:36:29	10d 00h 36m 29s	
7	Louis Burton (FRA)	FRA 02	Bureau Vallée (2)	2020	10/12/2023 21:33:11	10d 04h 33m 11s	
8	Nicolas Lunven (FRA)	FRA 85	Holcim – PRB	2022	11/12/2023 4:28:54	10d 11h 28m 54s	
9	Isabelle Joschke (FRA) (GER)	FRA 27	MACSF (2)	2007	11/12/2023 10:12:23	10d 17h 12m 23s	
10	Romain Attanasio (FRA)	FRA 10	Fortinet – Best Western (2)	2015	11/12/2023 14:20:04	10d 21h 20m 04s	
11	Pip Hare (GBR)	GBR 77	Medallia	2015	11/12/2023 14:41:14	10d 21h 41m 14s	
12	Clarisse Cremer (FRA)	FRA 15	L’Occitane en Provence (2)	2019	11/12/2023 21:33:24	11d 04h 33m 24s	
13	Benjamin Ferré (FRA)	FRA 30	Monnoyeur Duo For a Job	2011	12/12/2023 00:34:42	11d 07h 34m 42s	
14	Conrad Colman (USA) (NZL)	NZL 64	Mail Boxes Etc.	2007	12/12/2023 02:30:42	11d 09h 30 m 42s	
15	Alan Roura (SUI)	SUI 7	Hublot	2019	12/12/2023 03:38:59	11d 10h 38 m 59s	
16	Arnaud Boissières (FRA)	FRA 14	La Mie Câline (3)	2010	12/12/2023 07:59:02	11d 14h 59 m 02s	
17	Thomas Ruyant (FRA)	FRA 59	For People	2023	12/12/2023 08:59:46	11d 15h 59m 46s	
18	Kojiro Shiraishi (JPN)	JPN 11	DMG Mori Global One	2019	12/12/2023 09:11:42	11d 16h 11m 42s	
19	Sébastien Simon (FRA)	FRA 112	Groupe Dubreuil	2021	12/12/2023 11:36:00	11d 18h 36m 00s	
20	Tanguy Le Turquais (FRA)	FRA 1000	LAZARE	2008	12/12/2023 17:07:00	12d 00h 07m 27s	
21	Sébastien Marsset (FRA)	FRA 83	Foussier-Mon Courtier Energie	2006	12/12/2023 17:37:59	12d 00h 37m 59s	
22	Louis Duc (FRA)	FRA 172	Fives Group – Lantana Environment	2006	12/12/2023 22:38:27	12d 05h 38m 27s	
23	Violette Dorange (FRA)	FRA 01	Devenir	2007	13/12/2023 00:34:55	12d 07h 34m 55s	
24	Guirec Soudee (FRA)	FRA 22	Freelance.com	2007	13/12/2023 02:17:45	12d 09h 17m 45s	
25	Manuel Cousin (FRA)	FRA 71	Coup de Pouce – Giffard Manutention	2007	13/12/2023 04:53:38	12d 11h 53m 38s	
26	Antoine Cornic (FRA)	FRA 1461	Human Immobilier	2006	13/12/2023 06:19:23	12d 13h 19m 23s	
27	Fabrice Amedeo (FRA)	FRA 56	Nexans – Art et Fenêtres (2)	2007	13/12/2023 08:04:46	12d 15h 04m 46s	
28	Szabolcs Weöres (HUN)	HUN 23	New Europe	2007	13/12/2023 08:18:57	12d 15h 18m 57s	
29	François Guiffant (FRA)	FRA 20	Partage	2004	13/12/2023 14:11:01	12d 21h 11m 01s	
30	Denis Van Weynbergh (BEL)	BEL 207	D'Ieteren Group	2014	14/12/2023 07:35:53	13d 14h 35m 53s	
31	Jingkun Xu (CHN)	CHN 5	Singchain Team Haikou	2007	14/12/2023 12:24:51	13d 19h 24m 51s	
32	Jean Le Cam (FRA)	FRA 29	Tout commence en Finistère – Armor-lux	2023	18/12/2023 22:37:24	18d 5h 37m 24s	
