= 2014 Route du Rhum =

Event title
- Name: 2014 Route du Rhum
- Edition: 10th Edition
- Sponsor: Destination Guadeloupe
- Host: Pen Duick SAS

Event details
- Start location: St Malo (FRA)
- Finish location: Guadeloupe
- Course: Solo Non-Stop Transatlantic Race
- Dates: Starts 2nd November 2014
- Yachts: 91 Boats

Competitors
- Competitors: 91 Sailors
- Competing nations: BEL 1, ESP 1, FIN 1, FRA 80, GBR 3, ITA 2, POR 1, RSA 1, SUI 1

Results
- Line honours: Banque Populaire VII

Classes
- Class 1: Ultime
- Class 2: Multi 50
- Class 3: IMOCA 60
- Class 4: Class40
- Class 5: Rhum Monohull

The Route du Rhum is a single person transatlantic race the 2010 race was the 10th edition and had six classes with 91 boats taking part.

== Ultime ==
Pos	Sail No.	Boat name	Year	Name / Nationality	Finish Time	Elapsed Time	Delta %	Speed	Distance Sailed	Ref.
1		Banque Populaire VII	2006	Loïck Peyron (FRA)	2014-11-10 - 05:08:32	07d 15h 08m 32s	0	19.34	0	
2		SPINDRIFT 2	2008	Yann Guichard (FRA)	2014-11-10 - 19:18:46	08d 05h 18m 46s	7.74	17.95	0	
3	MOD 04	EDMOND DE ROTHSCHILD (Gitana XV)	2011 (70 ft Tri)	Sébastien Josse (FRA)	2014-11-11 - 04:47:09	08d 14h 47m 09s	12.91	17.13	0	
4		PRINCE DE BRETAGNE	2002 / 2014 (80 ft Tri)	Lionel Lemonchoix (FRA)	2014-11-11 - 07:44:50	08d 17h 44m 50s	14.53	16.89	0	
5	MOD 07	MUSANDAM - OMAN SAIL	2012 (70 ft Tri)	Sidney Gavinet (FRA)	2014-11-11 - 08:15:24	08d 19h 15m 24s	15.35	16.77	0	
6		IDEC SPORT	2007	Francis Joyon (FRA)	2014-11-11 - 18:42:04	09d 04h 42m 04s	20.51	16.05	0	
7	MOD 06	PAPREC RECYCLAGE	2011 (70 ft Tri)	Yann Eliès (FRA)	2014-11-11 - 19:48:15	09d 05h 48m 15s	21.11	15.97	0	
RET	FRA 73	SODEBO ULTIM	2001 / 2014	Thomas Coville (FRA)	3 Nov - Collision with a cargo ship					

== Multi 50 ==
Pos	Sail No.	Boat name	Design	Year	Name / Nationality	Finish Time	Elapsed Time	Delta %	Ref.
1	FRA 3	Fenetrea - Cardinal	CDK - VPLP	2009	Erwan Leroux (FRA)	2014-11-13 - 19:13:55	11d 05h 13m 55s	0%	13.16
2	FRA 9	Arkema Region Aquitaine	Roucayrol / Neyhousser	2013	Lalou Roucayrol (FRA)	2014-11-14 - 11:29:10	11d 21h 29m 10s	6.04%	12.41
3	FRA 35	Rennes Metropole - Saint Malo Agglomeration	Marsaudon Composites - Cabaret / Irens	2009	Gilles Lamire (FRA)	2014-11-15 - 0:44:37	12d 10h 44m 37s	10.96%	11.86
4	FRA 53	Actual	Verdier	2009	Yves Leblevec (FRA)	2014-11-15 - 1:10:18	12d 11h 10m 18s	11.12%	11.84
5	FRA 55	Pirâ² Cci Fecamp Bolbec	Langevin	1983	Etienne Hochede (FRA)	2014-11-20 - 23:37:11	18d 09h 37m 11s	64.03%	8.02
RET		Olmix	Browns / Gaudry	1991	Pierre Antoine (FRA)	4 Nov -			
RET	FRA 22	Delirium	Carlan/Thouverez	2006	Herve De Carlan (FRA)	3 Nov -			
RET	FRA 16	Nootka Pour Architectes De L'Urgence	Irens	1990	Gilles Buekenhout (FRA)	3 Nov -			
RET	FRA 14	Vers Un Monde Sans Sida	Grand Largue Comp. - Feron	2007	Erik Nigon (FRA)	3 Nov -			
RET	FRA 17	Royan	Pulsar 50	2004	Alain Delhumeau (FRA)	3 Nov - Dismasted			
RET		Maitre Jacques	CDK - VPLP	2005	Loic Fequet (FRA)	2 Nov -			

== IMOCA 60 ==
Pos.	Boat name	Yr. Launch	Name	Finish Time	Elapsed Time	Note	Ref.
1	Macif	2011	François Gabart (FRA)	14/11/2014 - 18:38:55	12d 04h 38m 55"		
2	Maitre Coq (3)	2010	Jérémie Beyou (FRA)	15/11/2014 - 02:11:18	12d 12h 11m 18"		
3	Safran (2)	2007	Marc Guillemot (FRA)	15/11/2014 - 15:59:20	13d 01h 59m 20"		
4	For Humble Heroes	2007	Armel Tripon (FRA)	16/11/2014 - 04:04:04	13d 14h 04m 04s		
5	Bureau Vallée (1)	2006	Louis Burton (FRA)	16/11/2014 - 15:33:44	14d 01h 33m 44s		
6	Team Plastque - AFM Telethon	1999	Alessandro Di Benedetto (FRA)	19/11/2014 - 01:04:30	16d 11h 04m 30s		
7	Initiatives-Cœur (2)	2006	Tanguy de Lamotte (FRA)	19/11/2014 - 05:28:13	16d 15h 28m 13s		
ABD	VOTRE NOM AUTOUR DU MONDE	2007	Bertrand de Broc (FRA)				
ABD	PRB (4)	2015	Vincent Riou (FRA)				

== Class 40 ==
Pos	Sail No.	Boat name	Design	Year	Name / Nationality	Finish Time	Elapsed Time	Delta %	Ref.
1	ESP 123	THALES 2 / Santander 2014	Botin	2013	Alex Pella (ESP)	2014-11-19 - 07:47:08	16d 17h 47m 08s	0%	
2	FRA 137	Solidaires en Peloton	Mach 40	2014	Thibaut Vauchel-Camus (FRA)	2014-11-19 - 18:33:41	17d 04h 33m 41s	2.68%	
3	FRA 119	Otio-Bastide Médical	Tyker Evolution 3	2012	Kito de Pavant (FRA)	2014-11-19 - 19:07:03	17d 05h 07m 03s	2.82%	
4	FRA 109	IXBlue - BRS	Pogo 40S2	2011	Stéphane Le Diraison (FRA)	2014-11-19 - 22:21:37	17d 08h 21m 37s	3.63%	
5	FRA 79	Matouba	Owen C	2009	Pierre Brasseur (FRA)	2014-11-20 - 04:27:44	17d 14h 27m 44s	5.15%	
6	GBR 101	Campagne de France	Pogo 40S2	2011	Miranda Merron (GBR)	2014-11-20 - 17:17:25	18d 03h 17m 25s	8.34%	
7	FRA 142	Le Conservateur	Tiz'h 40	2014	Yannick Bestaven (FRA)	2014-11-19 - 20:34:37	17d 06h 34m 37s	3.18%	
8	FRA 131	ERDF - Des pieds et des mains	Akilaria RC 3	2013	Damien Seguin (FRA)	2014-11-20 - 23:19:21	18d 09h 19m 21s	9.84%	
9	FRA 81	SNCF Géodis - Newrest	Akilaria RC2	2009	Fabrice Amadeo (FRA)	2014-11-20 - 23:36:32	18d 09h 36m 32s	9.91%	
10	ITA 126	Fantastica	Tyker 40	2013	Giancarlo Pedote (ITA)	2014-11-21 - 04:26:43	19d 14h 26m 43s	17.09%	
11	FRA 98	Maison Tirel Guerin	Tyker 40 Evolution 2	2010	Valentin Lemarchand (FRA)	2014-11-21 - 11:29:48	18d 21h 29m 48s	12.87%	
12	FRA 115	Teamwork40	Mach 40	2012	Bertrand Delesne (FRA)	2014-11-21 - 14:55:39	19d 00h 55m 39s	13.72%	
13	FRA 85	Picoty-Lac de Vassivière	Pogo 40S2	2010	Jean-Christophe Caso (FRA)	2014-11-21 - 15:53:11	19d 01h 53m 11s	13.96%	
14	FRA 135	L'Express - Trepia	Pogo 40S3	2014	Pierre-Yves Lautrou (FRA)	2014-11-21 - 18:16:30	19d 04h 16m 30s	14.56%	
15	BEL 107	Visit Brussels	Kiwi 40FC	2011	Michel Kleinjans (BEL)	2014-11-21 - 20:06:36	19d 06h 06m 36s	15.01%	
16	FRA 141	Campagne 2 France	Pogo 40S3	2014	Halvard Mabire (FRA)	2014-11-22 - 04:09:56	19d 14h 09m 56s	17.02%	
17	FRA 68	Région Haute Normandie	Pogo	2008	Jean-Edouard Criquioche (FRA)	2014-11-22 - 04:34:20	19d 14h 33m 05s	17.12%	
18	FRA 95	Serenis Consulting	Pogo 40S2	2010	Jean Galfione (FRA)	2014-11-22 - 13:19:32	19d 23h 19m 32s	19.3%	
19	FRA 93	Eau et patrimoine	Akilaria RC2	2010	Juliette Petres (FRA)	2014-11-22 - 13:52:07	19d 23h 52m 07s	19.43%	
20	FRA 133	TERANGA	Pogo 40S3	2013	Emmanuel Hamez (FRA)	2014-11-22 - 22:07:09	20d 08h 07m 09s	21.49%	
21	FRA 124	Groupement Flo	Akilaria RC 3	2012	Brieuc Maisonneuve (FRA)	2014-11-23 - 07:30:15	20d 17h 30m 15s	23.82%	
22	FRA 89	Marie-Galante	Akilaria	2010	Dominique Rivard (FRA)	2014-11-23 - 13:19:46	20d 23h 19m 46s	25.27%	
23	FRA 45	V and B / MS-SAILING team	Akilaria RC1	2007	Maxime Sorel (FRA)	2014-11-23 - 18:42:00	21d 04h 42m 00s	26.61%	
24	FRA 91	Kogane	JPK 40	2009	Patrice Bougard (FRA)	2014-11-23 - 19:24:06	21d 05h 24m 06s	26.78%	
25	FRA 105	April	Akilaria	2011	Lionel Regnier (FRA)	2014-11-23 - 20:24:03	21d 06h 24m 03s	27.03%	
26	FRA 22	Voile 44 AAEA CAVA	Pogo 40S1	2006	Rodolphe Sepho (FRA)	2014-11-24 - 08:33:11	21d 18h 33m 11s	30.06%	
27	FRA 99	Ville de Sainte-Anne - Guadeloupe	Akilaria	2010	Philippe Fiston (FRA)	2014-11-24 - 20:04:48	22d 06h 04m 48s	32.93%	
28	FRA 134	Guadeloupe Grand Large - 1001 piles batteries	Mach 40	2014	Nicolas Thomas (FRA)	2014-11-26 - 08:32:08	23d 18h 32m 08s	42%	
29	FRA 60	Obportus - Conseil régional de Lorraine	JPK40	2007	Olivier Roussey (FRA)	2014-11-26 - 22:01:21	24d 08h 01m 21s	45.36%	
30	FRA 57	Setti LTD	Pogo 40S1	2007	Antoine Michel (FRA)	2014-11-27 - 01:13:05	24d 11h 13m 05s	46.15%	
31	FRA 104	Bruneau	Manuard	2011	Paul Hignard (FRA)	2014-11-27 - 21:35:10	25d 07h 35m 10s	51.22%	
32	FRA 31	VANETYS - LE SLIP FRANCAIS	LC40	2007	Vincent Lantin (FRA)	2014-12-03 - 04:35:00	30d 14h 35m 00s	82.83%	
RET	FRA 65	Advanced Energies Carac	Akilaria Mk2 (Proto)	2008	Louis Duc (FRA)	7 Nov - Sail Damage			
RET	GBR 132	CATPHONES - BUILT FOR IT	Akilaria RC 3	2013	Conrad Humphreys (GBR)	7 Nov - Dismasted			
RET	FRA 113	Normandie Sussex	Pogo 40S2	2011	Christophe Coatnoan (FRA)	6 Nov - Electrical Problems			
RET	SUI 103	Exocet	Canivenc	0	Alan Roura (SUI)	5 Nov -			
RET	FRA 130	GDF SUEZ	Mach 40	2013	Sebastien Rogues (FRA)	5 Nov - Sail Damage			
RET	FRA 30	Aerocampus Du Rhum au Globe	CMI / Rogers	2007	Arnaud Boissières (FRA)	4 Nov -			
RET	FRA 83	Wallfo.com	Akilaria	2009	Thierry Bouchard (FRA)	3 Nov -			
RET	FRA 125	Crédit Mutuel de Bretagne	Custom Humphreys	2013	Nicolas Troussel (FRA)	3 Nov -			
RET	RSA 52	Swish	Rodgers	2007	Phillippa Cavanough (RSA)	3 Nov - Mast Broken			
RET	FRA 140	CAP WEST	Sabrosa 40 Mk2	2014	Marc Lepesqueux (FRA)	3 Nov -			
RET	FRA 139	TEAM SABROSA SR40mk2	Sabrosa 40	2014	Francois Angoulvant (FRA)	2 Nov -			

== Rhum ==
Pos	Sail No.	Boat name	Design	Year	Name / Nationality	Finish Time	Elapsed Time	Delta %	Ref.
1		Aneo			Anne Caseneuve (FRA)	2014-11-19 - 21:06:03			
2		Vento Di Sardegna			Andrea Mura (ITA)	2014-11-22 - 16:19:36			
3	GBR 300X	Grey Power	IMOCA 60	1997	Robin Knox-Johnston (GBR)	2014-11-22 - 21:52:22			
4		Cap Au Cap Location			Wilfrid Clerton (FRA)	2014-11-23 - 02:19:33			
5		Groupe Berto			Jean-Paul Froc (FRA)	2014-11-24 - 04:42:21			
6		Tradysion Gwadloup			Willy Bissainte (FRA)	2014-11-24 - 05:34:02			
7		Acapella			Charlie Capelle (FRA)	2014-11-25 - 02:27:24			
8		Destination Calais	RM 1350		Pierre-Yves Chatelin (FRA)	2014-11-25 - 11:06:24			
9		Neste Oil			Ari Huusela (FIN)	2014-11-27 - 03:07:23			
10		Defi Martinique			Daniel Ecalard (FRA)	2014-11-27 - 16:14:46			
11		Ensemble Pour Entreprendre			Pierrick Tollemer (FRA)	2014-11-27 - 21:50:50			
12		Guadeloupe Dynamique			Luc Coquelin (FRA)	2014-11-28 - 21:07:17			
13		Rhum Solitaire Rhum Solidaire			Christophe Souchaud (FRA)	2014-11-29 - 02:44:30			
14		Defi Cat			Eric Jail (FRA)	2014-12-02 - 23:45:00			
NL		Parisasia.Fr			Ricardo Diniz (POR)				
ABD		Groupe Guisnel			Bob Escoffier (FRA)				
ABD		Komilfo			Julien Mabit (FRA)				
ABD		Krit'R V			Benjamin Hardouin (FRA)				
ABD		Ortis			Patrick Morvan (FRA)				
ABD		Let'S Go			Nils Boyer (FRA)				
