= IMOCA 60 Safran 2 =

Sailboat

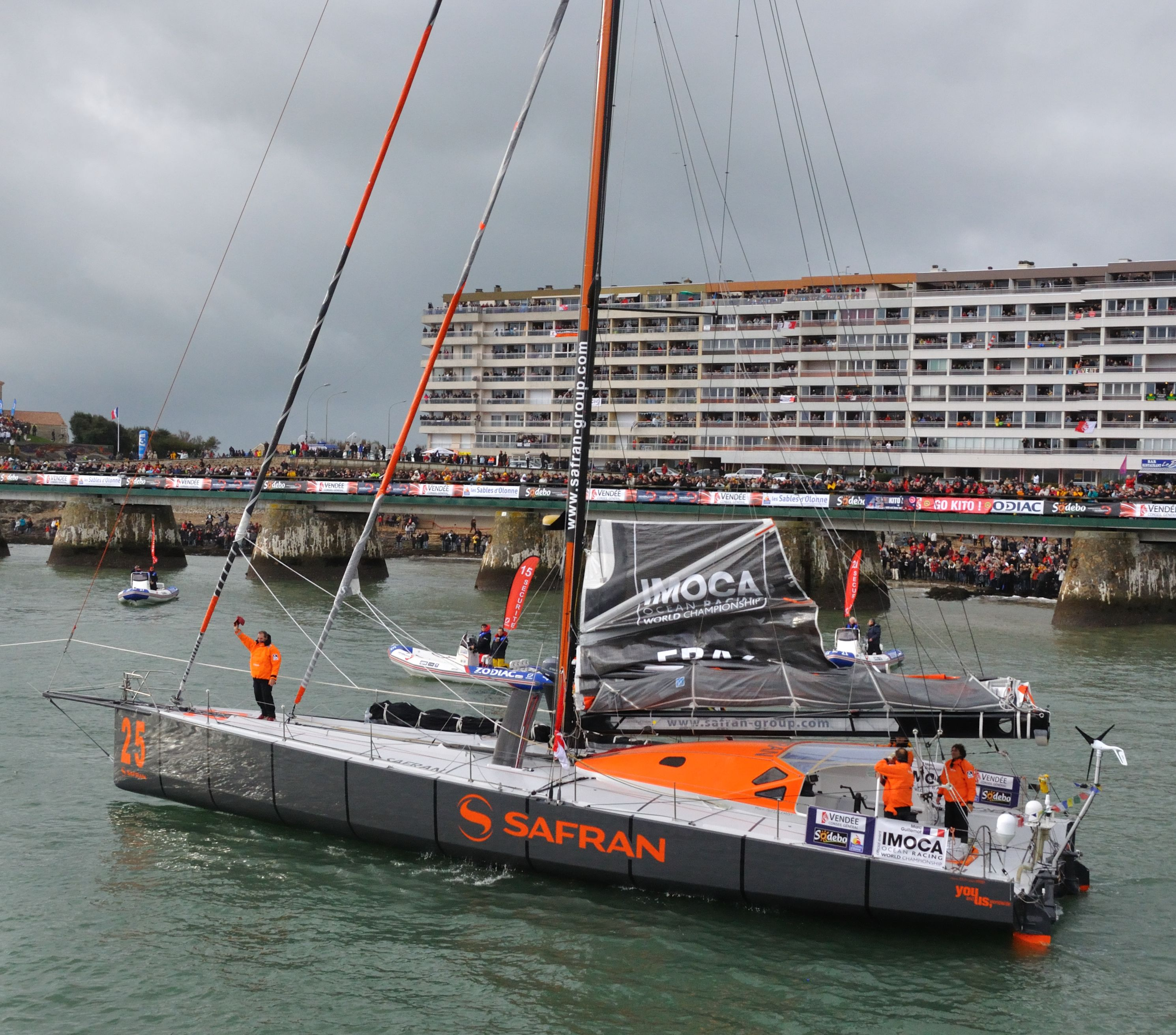

Development
- Designer: VPLP Design, Guillaume Verdier
- Year: 6 August 2007

Racing
- Class association: IMOCA 60

The IMOCA 60 class yacht MACSF (baptismal name: Safran 2) was designed by Lauriot-Prévost and G. Verdier and launched in the August 2007 after being built by Chantier Naval de Laros in France.

== Names and ownership ==
Safran (2007-2014)

- Skipper: Marc Guillemot

Quéguiner – Leucémie Espoir (2014-2017)

- Skipper: Yann Elies

Sensations (2017)

- Skipper: Isabelle Joschke

Generali (2017)

- Skipper: Isabelle Joschke

Monin (2018)

- Skipper: Isabelle Joschke

MACSF (since 2018)

- Skipper: Isabelle Joschke
- Sail No.: FRA 27

== Racing results ==
Pos	Year	Race	Class	Boat name	Crew	Time	Notes	Ref
Round the world races
	2024	2024–2025 Vendée Globe	IMOCA 60	MACSF, FRA 27	Isabelle Joschke (FRA) (GER)			
DNF	2020	2020–2021 Vendée Globe	IMOCA 60	MACSF, FRA 27	Isabelle Joschke (FRA) (GER)	Abandoned Day 62	Keel Issues	
5 / 29	2017	2016–2017 Vendée Globe	IMOCA 60	Quéguiner – Leucémie Espoir, FRA 029	Yann Elies (FRA)	80d 03h 11m		
DNF	2013	2012–2013 Vendée Globe	IMOCA 60	Safran 2, FRA 25	Marc Guillemot (FRA)			
3 / 30	2009	2008–2009 Vendée Globe	IMOCA 60	Safran 2, FRA 25	Marc Guillemot (FRA)	95d 03h 19m		
Transatlantic Races
9	2022	Route du Rhum	IMOCA 60	MACSF (2), FRA 27	Isabelle Joschke (FRA) (GER)	13d 02h 26m 54s		
3	2014	Route du Rhum	IMOCA 60	Safran (2)	Marc Guillemot (FRA)	13d 01h 59m 20s		
3	2010	Route du Rhum	IMOCA 60	Safran (2)	Marc Guillemot (FRA)	14d 12h 28m 02s		
29 / 40	2023	Transat Jacques Vabre	IMOCA 60	MACSF (2), FRA 27	Isabelle Joschke (GER); Pierre Brasseur (FRA)	17d 02h 30m 32s		
12 / 22	2021	Transat Jacques Vabre	IMOCA 60	MACSF (2), FRA 27	Isabelle Joschke (GER); Fabien Delahaye (FRA)	21d 11h 4m 33s		
ABN / 29	2019	Transat Jacques Vabre	IMOCA 60	MACSF (2), FRA 27	Isabelle Joschke (GER); Morgan Lagravière (FRA)			
8 / 13	2017	Transat Jacques Vabre	IMOCA 60	Generali, FRA 27	Isabelle Joschke (GER); Pierre Brasseur (FRA)	16d 0h 33m 1s		
3 / 21	2015	Transat Jacques Vabre	IMOCA 60	Queguiner - Leucémie Espoir	Yann Elies (FRA); Charlie Dalin (FRA)	17d 10h 01m 23s		
2 / 10	2013	Transat Jacques Vabre	IMOCA 60	Safran (2)	Marc Guillemot (FRA); Pascal Bidégorry (FRA)	17d 4h 43m 23s		
6 / 14	2011	Transat Jacques Vabre	IMOCA 60	Safran (2)	Marc Guillemot (FRA); Yann Eliès (FRA)	16d 19h 27m 52s		
1 / 14	2009	Transat Jacques Vabre	IMOCA 60	Safran (2)	Marc Guillemot (FRA); Charles Caudrelier (FRA)			
2 / 18	2007	Transat Jacques Vabre	IMOCA 60	Safran (2)	Marc Guillemot (FRA); Charles Caudrelier (FRA)	17d 03h 31m 55s		
9 / 32	2023	Retour à la base	IMOCA 60	MACSF (2), FRA 27	Isabelle Joschke (GER) (FRA)	10d 17h 12m 23s		
5 / 7	2011	Transat B to B	IMOCA 60	Safran (2)	Marc Guillemot (FRA)	9d 21h 33min 00s		
5 / 15	2007	Transat Ecover B to B	IMOCA 60	Safran (2)	Marc Guillemot (FRA)	15d 08h 25m 44s		
Other Races
