= 2021 Transat Jacques Vabre =

The 2021 of the Transat Jacques Vabre was the 15th edition and was raced from Le Havre, France, to Fort de France, Martinique.

- ULTIM: 5 Starters
- IMOCA 60: 22 Starters
- Multi 50: 7 Starters
- Class 40: 45 Starters

== Ultime Multihulls ==
Pos.	Crew	Boat name	Year	Date Finish	Elapsed Time
1	Franck Cammas (FRA); Charles Caudrelier (FRA)	Maxi Edmond de Rothschild	2017	Tue 23 Nov – 15h16	16d 01h 49m 16s
2	François Gabart (FRA); Tom Laperche (FRA)	SVR-Lazartigue	2021	Tue 23 Nov – 23h13	16d 09h 46m 11s
3	Armel Le Cléac'h (FRA); Kevin Escoffier (FRA)	Banque Populaire XI	2021	Wed 24 Nov – 00h06	16d 10h 39m 20s
4	Yves Le Blevec (FRA); Anthony Marchand (FRA)	Actual Ultim 3	2015	Thu 25 Nov – 23h46	18d 10h 19m 15s
5	Thomas Coville (FRA); Thomas Rouxel (FRA)	Sodebo ultim 3	2019	Sat 27 Nov – 03h59	19d 14h 32m 41s

== IMOCA 60 ==
Pos.	Crew	Boat name	Boat Age	Date Finish	Elapsed Time
1	Thomas Ruyant (FRA); Morgan Lagravière (FRA)	Linked Out	2019	25-11	18d 01h 21m 10s
2	Charlie Dalin (FRA); Paul Meilhat (FRA)	Apivia	2019	26-11	18d 21h 33m 31s
3	Jérémie Beyou (FRA); Christopher Pratt (FRA)	Charal	2018	27-11	19d 14h 59m 36s
4	Sébastien Simon (FRA); Yann Eliès (FRA)	Arkea-Paprec	2019	28-11	20d 17h 08m 30s
5	Samantha Davies (GBR); Nicolas Lunven (FRA)	Initiatives-Cœur	2010	28-11	20d 17h 30m 10s
6	Giancarlo Pedote (ITA); Martin Le Pape (FRA)	Prysmian Group	2015	28-11	20d 19h 17m 54s
7	Romain Attanasio (FRA); Sébastien Marsset (FRA)	Fortinet-Best Western	2015	28-11	20d 20h 10m 10s
8	Nicolas Troussel (FRA); Sébastien Josse (FRA)	Corum L'Épargne	2020	28-11	20d 21h 15m 49s
9	Yannick Bestaven (FRA); Jean-Marie Dauris (FRA)	Maître Coq IV	2015	28-11	21d 00h 22m 53s
10	Fabrice Amedeo (FRA); Loïs Berrehar (FRA)	Nexans-Art & Fenêtres	2015	28-11	21d 03h 44m 22s
11	Damien Seguin (FRA); Benjamin Dutreux (FRA)	Groupe Apicil	2008	28-11	21d 07h 41m 21s
12	Isabelle Joschke (FRA); Fabien Delahaye (FRA)	MACSF	2007	28-11	21d 11h 04m 33s
13	Charlie Enright (USA); Pascal Bidégorry (FRA)	11th Hour Racing-Mālama	2021	28-11	21d 13h 37m 20s
14	Louis Duc (FRA); Marie Tabarly (FRA)	Kostum-Lantana Paysage	2006	29-11	21d 20h 45m 54s
15	Stéphane Le Diraison (FRA); Didac Costa (ESP)	Time for Oceans	2007	29-11	21d 21h 38m 14s
16	Arnaud Boissières (FRA); Rodolphe Sepho (FRA)	La Mie Câline; Artisans Artipôle	2007	29-11	22d 00h 12m 13s
17	Clément Giraud (FRA); Erik Nigon (FRA)	Compagnie du lit / Jiliti	2006	29-11	22d 01h 26m 29s
18	Manuel Cousin (FRA); Alexia Barrier (FRA)	Groupe Setin-4MyPlanet	2007	29-11	22d 03h 11m 21s
19	Denis Van Weynbergh (BEL); Tanguy Le Turquais (FRA)	Laboratoires de Biarritz	2014	01-12	24d 06h 12m 34s
20	Antoine Cornic (FRA); Jean-Charles Luro (FRA)	Ebac	2005	02-12	24d 22h 58m 32s
RET	Justine Mettraux (SUI) [Simon Fisher (GBR)	11th Hour Racing-Alaka'i	2015	10 November Dismasted	
RET	Louis Burton (FRA); Davy Beaudart (FRA)	Bureau Vallée 3	2020	7 November Dismasted	

== Multi 50 ==
Pos.	Crew	Boat name	Boat Age	Date Finish	Elapsed Time	Notes	Ref.
1	Sébastien Rogues (FRA); Matthieu Souben (FRA)	Primonial		Tue 23 Nov – 02h54	15d 13h 27m 14s		
2	Erwan Le Roux (FRA); Xavier Macaire (FRA)	Koesio		Tue 23 Nov – 05h22	15d 15h 55m 12s		
3	Sam Goodchild (GBR); Aymeric Chappellier (FRA)	LEYTON		Tue 23 Nov – 06h42	15d 17h 15m 43s		
4	Thibaut Vauchel Camus (FRA); Frédéric Duthil (FRA)	Solidaires En Peloton		Tue 23 Nov – 20h16	16d 06h 49m 35s		
5	Armel Tripon (FRA); Benoit Marie (FRA)	Les P'tits Doudous		Tue 23 Nov – 20h28	16d 07h 01m 22s		
6	Gilles Lamiré (FRA); Yvan Bourgnon (FRA)	Groupe GCA – 1001 Sourires		Wed 24 Nov – 03h28	16d 14h 01m 21s		
7	Quentin Vlamynck (FRA); Lalou Roucayrol (FRA)	Arkema 4		Wed 24 Nov – 16h08	17d 02h 41m 09s		

== Class 40 ==
Pos.	Crew	Sail No.	Boat name	Date Finish	Elapsed Time	Notes	Ref.
1	Antoine Carpentier (FRA); Pablo Santurde Del Arco (ESP)	161	Redman	Mon 29 Nov – 12h00	21d 22h 33m 30s		
2	Valentin Gautier (SUI); Simon Koster (SUI)	159	Banque du Léman	Mon 29 Nov – 13h04	21d 23h 37m 38s		
3	Cédric Château (FRA); Jérémie Mion (FRA)	172	Seafrigo – Sogestran	Mon 29 Nov – 13h38	21d 23h 37m 53s		
4	Jonas Gerckens (BEL); Benoit Hantzperg (FRA)	164	Volvo	Mon 29 Nov – 13h58	22d 00h 31m 04s		
5	Luke Berry (FRA); Achille Nebout (FRA)	153	Lamotte Module Création	Mon 29 Nov – 14h32	22d 01h 05m 49s		
6	Nicolas Jossier (FRA); Alexis Loison (FRA)	154	La Manche #EvidenceNautique	Mon 29 Nov – 15h52	22d 02h 25m 07s		
7	Emmanuel Le Roch (FRA); Pierre Quiroga (FRA)	165	Edenred	Mon 29 Nov – 16h34	22d 03h 07m 53s		
8	Pierre Casenave-Péré (FRA); Kevin Bloch (FRA)	145	Legallais	Mon 29 Nov – 17h44	22d 04h 17m 22s		
9	Amélie Grassi (FRA); Marie Riou (FRA)	170	LA BOULANGERE BIO	Mon 29 Nov – 17h56	22d 04h 29m 20s		
10	Jean Galfione (FRA); Eric Péron (FRA)	163	Serenis Consulting	Mon 29 Nov – 18h42	22d 05h 15m 20s		
11	Brian Thompson (GBR); Alister Richardson (GBR)	137	Tquila	Mon 29 Nov – 19h38	22d 06h 11m 08s		
12	Axel Trehin (FRA); Frédéric Denis (FRA)	162	Project Rescue Ocean	Mon 29 Nov – 20h10	22d 06h 43m 50s		
13	Nicolas D'Estais (FRA); Erwan Le Draoulec (FRA)	167	Emile Henry – Happyvore	Mon 29 Nov – 20h50	22d 07h 23m 30s		
14	Ian Lipinski (FRA); Julien Pulvé (FRA)	158	Crédit Mutuel	Tue 30 Nov – 00h07	22d 10h 40m 58s		
15	Charles-Louis Mourruau (FRA); Andrea Fantini (ITA)	156	Guidi	Tue 30 Nov – 01h00	22d 11h 33m 57s		
16	Antoine Magré (FRA); Olivier Magré (FRA)	160	E.Leclerc Ville-La-Grand	Tue 30 Nov – 03h25	22d 13h 58m30s		
17	Ivica Kostelic (CRO); Calliste Antoine (FRA)	130	Croatia Full Of Life	Tue 30 Nov – 03h56	22d 14h 29m 51s		
18	Masa Suzuki (JPN); Anne Beaugé (FRA)	101	Milai	Tue 30 Nov – 07h26	22d 17h 59m 30s		
19	Renaud Courbon (FRA); Guillaume Pirouelle (FRA)	133	Clown-hop	Tue 30 Nov – 09h55	22d 20h 28m 54s		
20	Hervé Thomas (FRA); Gérald Véniard (FRA)	149	Saint Yves Services ODEGAM	Tue 30 Nov – 12h20	22d 22h 53m 26s		
21	Maxime Cauwe (FRA); Jules Bonnier (FRA)	98	Avanade	Tue 30 Nov – 13h24	22d 23h 57m 46s		
22	Aurélien Ducroz (FRA); David Sineau (FRA)	166	Crosscall	Tue 30 Nov – 14h05	23d 00h 38m 01s		
23	Matthieu Perraut (FRA); William Mathelin Moreaux (FRA)	131	Inter Invest	Tue 30 Nov – 16h16	23d 02h 49m 10s		
24	Jean-Pierre Balmes (FRA); Laurent Camprubi (FRA)	148	FullSave	Tue 30 Nov – 22h48	23d 09h 21m 28s		
25	Pierre-Louis Attwell (FRA); Maxime Bensa (FRA)	135	Vogue avec un Crohn	Wed 01 Dec – 00h45	23d 11h 18m 20s		
26	Stan Thuret (FRA); Mathieu Crepel (FRA)	147	EVERIAL	Wed 01 Dec – 01h08	23d 11h 41m 44s		
27	Didier Le Vourch (FRA); Olivier Delrieu (FRA)	134	Vicitan	Wed 01 Dec – 02h42	23d 13h 15m 27s		
28	Victor Jost (FRA); Enguerrand Granoux (FRA)	115	Exploring Tech for good	Wed 01 Dec – 03h41	23d 14h 14m 26s		
29	Sébastien Audigane (FRA); François Jambou (FRA)	151	Entrepreneurs pour la planète	Wed 01 Dec – 09h39	23d 20h 12m 28s		
30	Simon Kervarrec (FRA); Yannick Kervarrec (FRA)	141	Leclerc Samsic	Thu 02 Dec – 02h21	24d 12h 54m 07s		
31	Clara Fortin (FRA); Martin Louchart (FRA)	155	Randstad-Ausy	Thu 02 Dec – 03h04	24d 13h 37m 43s		
32	Nicolas Lemarchand (FRA); Thimoté Polet (FRA)	100	Entraide Marine	Thu 02 Dec – 09h02	24d 19h 35m 39s		
33	Thibaut Lefevere (FRA); Thomas Bulcke (FRA)	157	Free Dom	Thu 02 Dec – 09h28	24d 20h 01m 45s		
34	Jean Edouard Criquioche (FRA); Eric Baray (FRA)	103	Groupe G2C – La Martinique	Thu 02 Dec – 13h40	25d 00h 13m 52s		
35	Alex Mehran Jr (USA); Merfyn Owen (GBR)	132	Polka Dot	Thu 02 Dec – 15h14	25d 01h 47m 46s		
36	Frans Budel (FRA); Ysbrand Endt (FRA)	44	Sec Hayai	Fri 03 Dec – 11h38	25d 22h 11m 43s		
37	Florian Gueguen (FRA); Raphael Auffret (FRA)	104	Equipe Voile Parkinson	Fri 03 Dec – 11h58	25d 22h 31m 03s		
38	Julia Courtois (FRA); Jeanne Courtois (FRA)	139	Saint James – Biscuiterie de l'Abbaye	Fri 03 Dec – 12h15	26d 00h 48m 53s		
39	Kieran Le Borgne (FRA); Jean-Jacques Le Borgne (FRA)	88	Recycleurs Bretons – Navaleo	Fri 03 Dec – 18h10	26d 04h 43m 08s		
40	Baptiste Hulin (FRA); Christophe Bachmann (FRA)	152	Rennes.Saint-Malo – Rêves	Sat 04 Dec – 03h19	26d 13h 52m 36s		
41	Ryan Barkey (CAN); Melodie Schaffer (CAN)	128	Stormtech	Sat 04 Dec – 06h29	26d 17h 02m 28s		
42	Morgane Ursault Poupon (FRA); Julia Virat (FRA)	30	UP SAILING Unis pour la planète	Sun 05 Dec – 03h50	27d 14h 23m 46s		
43	Georges Guiguen (FRA); Morgann Pinson (FRA)	1	Terre Exotique	Sun 05 Dec – 12h31	27d 23h 04m 06s		
ABN	Tanguy Duchatelet (FRA); Fabrice Renouard (FRA)	140	LENZI – Lanternes de Paris				
ABN	Kito de Pavant (FRA); Gwen Gbick (FRA)	142	HBF – Reforest'action				
