= 2010 Route du Rhum =

Event title
- Name: 2010 Route du Rhum
- Edition: 9th Edition
- Sponsor: La Banque Postale
- Host: Pen Duick SAS

Event details
- Start location: St Malo (FRA)
- Finish location: Guadeloupe
- Course: Solo Non-Stop Transatlantic Race
- Dates: Starts 31st October 2010
- Yachts: 85 Boats

Competitors
- Competitors: 85 Sailors
- Competing nations: BEL 2, BUL 1, ESP 1, FIN 1, FRA 70, GBR 2, GER 1, ITA 3, NZL 1, NZL 1, SUI 2

Classes
- Class 1: Ultime
- Class 2: Multi 50
- Class 3: IMOCA 60
- Class 4: Class40
- Class 5: Rhum Monohull

The Route du Rhum is a single person transatlantic race the 2010 race was the 9th edition and had six classes with 91 boats taking part.

== Results ==
=== Multihull - Ultime (Maxi) ===
| Pos | Sail No. | Boat name | Year | Sailor (Nationality) | Elapsed Time | Delta % | Speed | Distance Sailed | Ref. |
|---|---|---|---|---|---|---|---|---|---|
| 1 | | Groupama (3) | 2006 | Franck Cammas (FRA) | 09d 03h 14m 47s | 0 | 16.16 | 0 | |
| 2 | | IDEC 2 | 2007 | Francis Joyon (FRA) | 09d 13h 50m 48s | 4.83 | 15.41 | | |
| 3 | | Sodebo (07') | 2007 | Thomas Coville (FRA) | 10d 03h 13m 11s | 10.93 | 14.56 | | |
| 4 | | Gitana 11 | | Yann Guichard (FRA) | 11d 11h 56m 38s | 25.86 | 12.84 | | |
| 5 | | La Boîte à Pizza | 2005 | Philippe Monnet (FRA) | 15d 01h 08m 50s | 64.72 | 9.81 | | |
| 6 | | Défi Cancale | 1988 | Gilles Lamiré (FRA) | 16d 00h 24m 35s | 75.33 | 9.21 | | |
| 7 | | Saint Malo 2015 | 1984 | Servane Escoffier (FRA) | 16d 06h 56m 13s | 78.31 | 9.06 | | |
| RET | | Oman Air Majan | 2009 | Sidney Gavignet (FRA) | Abandon | | | | |
| RET | | Côte d'Or | 1986 | Bertrand Quentin (FRA) | Abandon | | | | |

=== Multihull - Multi 50 ===
| Pos | Sail No. | Boat name | Design | Yr | Name / Nationality | Elapsed Time | Delta % | Speed | Distance Sailed | Ref. |
|---|---|---|---|---|---|---|---|---|---|---|
| 1 | | Prince de Bretagne | | 2009 | Lionel Lemonchois (FRA) | 15d 04h 50m 48s | 0% | 9.71 | - | |
| 2 | | Région Aquitaine | | 2007 | Lalou Roucayrol (FRA) | 15d 12h 30m 14s | 2.10% | 9.51 | - | |
| 3 | | Maître Jacques | | 2005 | Loïc Fequet (FRA) | 15d 14h 28m 26s | 2.64% | 9.46 | - | |
| 4 | | La Mer révèle nos sens | | 1991 | Philippe Laperche (FRA) | 15d 16h 21m 40s | 3.16% | 9.41 | - | |
| 5 | | Axa à tout cœur | | 1988 | Erik Nigon (FRA) | 15d 20h 46m 41s | 4.37% | 9.3 | - | |
| 6 | | Fenetra cardinal | | 2003 | Erwan Le Roux (FRA) | 15d 21h 25m 46s | 4.55% | 9.29 | - | |
| 7 | | Naviguez AnneCaseneuve | | | Anne Caseneuve (FRA) | 16d 09h 46m 17s | 7.93% | 9 | - | |
| 8 | | CitoyensduMonde.com | | 2007 | Jean-François Lilti (FRA) | 18d 02h 35m 24s | 19.12% | 8.15 | - | |
| 9 | | Nootka | | 1989 | Gilles Buekenhout (BEL) | 19d 08h 38m 39s | 27.35% | 7.62 | - | |
| RET | | Actual | | 2009 | Hervé de Carlan (FRA) | 15 Nov. | | | | |
| RET | | Crêpes Whaou | | 2009 | Franck-Yves Escoffier (FRA) | 11 Nov. | | | | |
| RET | | Délirium | | 2009 | Yves Le Blevec (FRA) | 5 Nov. | | | | |

=== Monohulls - IMOCA 60 ===
| Pos. | Boat name | Yr. Launch | Name | Finish Time | Elapsed Time | Note | Ref. |
|---|---|---|---|---|---|---|---|
| 1 | Véolia Environnement | 2007 | Roland Jourdain (FRA) | - | 13d 17h 10m 56s | | |
| 2 | Brit Air (2) | 2007 | Armel Le Cléac'h (FRA) | - | 14d 01h 06m 07s | | |
| 3 | Safran (2) | 2007 | Marc Guillemot (FRA) | - | 14d 12h 28m 02s | | |
| 4 | Virbac-Paprec 3 | 2009 | Jean-Pierre Dick (FRA) | - | 14d 15h 11m 13s | | |
| 5 | PRB (4) | 2010 | Vincent Riou (FRA) | - | 14d 18h 03m 52s | | |
| 6 | Foncia | 2010 | Michel Desjoyeaux (FRA) | - | 15d 17h 29m 04s | | |
| 7 | Akena Vérandas (3) | 2006 | Arnaud Boissières (FRA) | - | 15d 20h 34m 00s | | |
| 8 | DCNS | 2008 | Christopher Pratt (FRA) | - | 16d 07h 04m 23s | | |
| Abd | Groupe Bel | 2007 | Kito de Pavant (FRA) | Abandon | | | |

=== Monohulls - Class 40 ===
| Pos | Sail No. | Boat name | Design | Yr | Name / Nationality | Elapsed Time | Delta % | Speed | Distance | Ref. |
|---|---|---|---|---|---|---|---|---|---|---|
| 1 | FRA 88 | Destination Dunkerque | Tyker 40 Evolution 2 | 2010 | Thomas Ruyant (FRA) | 17d 23h 10m 17s | 0% | 0 | - | |
| 2 | FRA 95 | Crédit Mutuel de Bretagne | Pogo 40S2 | 2010 | Nicolas Troussel (FRA) | 18d 02h 40m 15s | 0.81% | 0 | - | |
| 3 | FRA 55 | Appart City | Verdier | 2007 | Yvan Noblet (FRA) | 18d 06h 38m 17s | 1.73% | 0 | - | |
| 4 | FRA 84 | Vecteur Plus | Manuard | 2009 | Samuel Manuard (FRA) | 18d 06h 42m 40s | 1.75% | 0 | - | |
| 5 | FRA 100 | MONBANA | Pogo 40S2 | 2010 | Damien Grimont (FRA) | 18d 10h 58m 20s | 2.74% | 0 | - | |
| 6 | GER 79 | Mare.de | Owen C | 2009 | Jörg Riechers (GER) | 18d 15h 01m 32s | 3.68% | 0 | - | |
| 7 | FRA 85 | Groupe Picoty | Pogo 40S2 | 2010 | Jean-Edouard Criquioche (FRA) | 18d 19h 49m 45s | 4.79% | 0 | - | |
| 8 | FRA 32 | Routes du Large | LNM40 | 2006 | Rémi Beauvais (FRA) | 19d 15h 42m 09s | 9.4% | 0 | - | |
| 9 | SUI 59 | Cheminées Poujoulat | Rogers | 2007 | Bernard Stamm (SUI) | 19d 20h 51m 51s | 10.6% | 0 | - | |
| 10 | FRA 52 | Des pieds et des mains | Rodgers | 2007 | Damien Seguin (FRA) | 20d 00h 06m 08s | 11.35% | 0 | - | |
| 11 | FRA 83 | Comiris - Elior | Akilaria | 2009 | Thierry Bouchard (FRA) | 20d 01h 05m 46s | 11.58% | 0 | - | |
| 12 | FRA 26 | Marie Toit - Caen la mer | Jumbo | 2006 | Marc Lepesqueux (FRA) | 20d 03h 27m 21s | 12.13% | 0 | - | |
| 13 | SUI 53 | Tzu Hang | Akilaria | 2007 | Axel Strauss (GER) (SUI) | 20d 03h 36m 35s | 12.16% | 0 | - | |
| 14 | GBR 93 | DMS | Akilaria RC2 | 2010 | Pete Goss (GBR) | 20d 04h 56m 10s | 12.47% | 0 | - | |
| 15 | FRA 30 | Initiatives Novedia | CMI / Rogers | 2007 | Tanguy de Lamotte (FRA) | 20d 07h 44m 00s | 13.12% | 0 | - | |
| 16 | FRA 47 | Avis immobilier | Akilaria | 2007 | Eric Galmard (FRA) | 20d 09h 14m 53s | 13.47% | 0 | - | |
| 17 | FRA 96 | Regis Guillemot Charter | Pogo 40S2 | 2010 | Régis Guillemot (FRA) | 20d 11h 54m 36s | 14.09% | 0 | - | |
| 18 | FRA 89 | Gonser Group - Cambio | Akilaria | 2010 | Olivier Singelin (FRA) | 20d 13h 12m 22s | 14.39% | 0 | - | |
| 19 | FRA 45 | EDF Energies nouvelles Vestas | Akilaria RC1 | 2007 | David Augeix (FRA) | 20d 13h 22m 14s | 14.43% | 0 | - | |
| 20 | FRA 2 | Bureau Vallée | Pogo 40S1 | 2004 | Louis Burton (FRA) | 20d 13h 44m 35s | 14.51% | 0 | - | |
| 21 | FRA 98 | Drekan Energie - Groupe Terrallia | Tyker 40 Evolution 2 | 2010 | Eric Defert (FRA) | 20d 14h 19m 22s | 14.65% | 0 | - | |
| 22 | FRA 42 | Grassi Bateaux | Akilaria RC1 | 2006 | Olivier Grassi (FRA) | 20d 16h 10m 05s | 15.07% | 0 | - | |
| 23 | FRA 60 | Partouche | JPK40 | 2007 | Christophe Coatnoan (FRA) | 20d 18h 03m 06s | 15.51% | 0 | - | |
| 24 | FRA 99 | Territoires Attitudes | Akilaria | 2010 | Philippe Fiston (FRA) | 21d 02h 00m 57s | 17.36% | 0 | - | |
| 25 | FRA 50 | Techneau | Pogo 40S1 | 2007 | Benoît Daval (FRA) | 21d 02h 12m 32s | 17.4% | 0 | - | |
| 26 | FRA 81 | GEODIS | Akilaria RC2 | 2009 | Fabrice Amedeo (FRA) | 21d 05h 21m 14s | 18.13% | 0 | - | |
| 27 | ITA 41 | UniCredit | Akilaria RC1 | 2007 | Marco Nannini (ITA) | 21d 09h 14m 10s | 19.03% | 0 | - | |
| 28 | NZL 90 | 40 Degrees | Jaz | 2009 | Conrad Colman (NZL) | 21d 09h 22m 22s | 19.06% | 0 | - | |
| 29 | FRA 25 | Ville de Douarnenez | Tyker | 2006 | Bertrand Guillonneau (FRA) | 21d 09h 54m 46s | 19.19% | 0 | - | |
| 30 | FRA 71 | Les 3 Caps | Akilaria | 2008 | Pierre-Marie Bazin (FRA) | 21d 12h 32m 29s | 19.8% | 0 | - | |
| 31 | FRA 18 | Fermiers de Loué/Sarthe | Sabrosa 40 | 2006 | François Angoulvant (FRA) | 22d 01h 48m 11s | 22.88% | 0 | - | |
| 32 | ESP 65 | Tales | Akilaria Mk2 (Proto) | 2008 | Gonzalo Botin (ESP) | 22d 02h 33m 44s | 23.05% | 0 | - | |
| 33 | GBR 77 | Icap ORCA | Orca | 2008 | Richard Tolkien (GBR) | 22d 21h 10m 44s | 27.37% | 0 | - | |
| 34 | FRA 91 | Kogane | JPK 40 | 2009 | Patrice Bougard (FRA) | 23d 00h 50m 48s | 28.22% | 0 | - | |
| 35 | FRA 27 | Ville de Saint Grégoire | Akilaria | 2006 | Marc Behaghel (FRA) | 24d 03h 15m 23s | 34.34% | 0 | - | |
| 36 | FRA 6 | Tradition Guadeloupe | Pogo 40S1 | 2006 | Willy Bissainte (FRA) | 24d 03h 31m 15s | 34.41% | 0 | - | |
| 37 | FRA 22 | Voiles 44 Région Guadeloupe | Pogo 40S1 | 2006 | Jimmy Dreux (FRA) | 24d 10h 34m 35s | 36.04% | 0 | - | |
| 38 | FRA 57 | Binic Un Port Dans La Ville | Pogo 40S1 | 2007 | Marc Joly (FRA) | 24d 15h 11m 47s | 37.11% | 0 | - | |
| 39 | BEL 40 | Green Energy 4 Seasons Diabétiques Challenges | Pogo 40S1 | 2007 | Denis Van Weynbergh (BEL) | 24d 20h 57m 33s | 38.45% | 0 | - | |
| 40 | FRA 14 | Chimirec - EVTV | Pogo 40S1 | 2006 | Gilbert Chollet (FRA) | 28d 04h 26m 02s | 56.88% | 0 | - | |
| ABD | BUL 92 | White Swallow | Orca | 2009 | Dimitar Topalov (BUL) | 18 Nov. | | | | |
| ABD | FIN 82 | Tieto Passion | Akilaria | 2009 | Jouni Romppanen (FIN) | 6 Nov. | | | | |
| ABD | ITA 69 | Adriatech | Pogo | 2008 | Davide Consorte (ITA) | 4 Nov. | | | | |
| ABD | NOR 36 | Solo | Express | 2008 | Rune Aasberg (NOR) | 3 Nov. | | | | |

=== Rhum ===
| Pos. | Sail No. | Boat name | Design | Yr. Launch | Name / Nationality | Finish Time | Elapsed Time | Delta % | Speed | Distance Sailed | Ref. |
|---|---|---|---|---|---|---|---|---|---|---|---|
| 1 | | Vento Di Sardegna | | 2000 | Andrea Mura (ITA) | 2010-11-19 - 0:0:0 | 19d 09h 40m 30s | 0% | 7.61 / 0 | 0 | |
| 2 | | Pour le Rire Médecin | | 1997 | Luc Coquelin (FRA) | 2010-11-21 - 0:0:0 | 20d 13h 15m 36s | 5.92% | 7.18 / 0 | 0 | |
| 3 | | monopticien.com | | 1996 | Julien Mabit (FRA) | 2010-11-22 - 0:0:0 | 22d 07h 42m 56s | 15.04% | 6.61 / 0 | 0 | |
| 4 | | Jeunes Dirigeants - Lorans | | 2006 | Pierre-Yves Guennec (FRA) | 2010-11-22 - 0:0:0 | 22d 10h 15m 35s | 15.59% | 6.58 / 0 | 0 | |
| 5 | | Acapella-Getraline/Sidaction | | | Charlie Capelle (FRA) | 2010-11-23 - 0:0:0 | 22d 13h 33m 28s | 16.3% | 6.54 / 0 | 0 | |
| 6 | | Eurosanit | | 1981 | Jean-Paul Froc (FRA) | 2010-11-24 - 0:0:0 | 24d 01h 30m 49s | 24.02% | 6.13 / 0 | 0 | |
| 7 | | VALE Nouvelle Calédonie | | 2006 | Yves Ecarlat (FRA) | 2010-11-25 - 0:0:0 | 25d 03h 51m 02s | 29.67% | 5.87 / 0 | 0 | |
| RET | | ATNinc.com (Up My Sleeve) | | 1985 | Etienne Giroire (FRA) | 13 Nov. - | | | | | |
| RET | | Destination Calais Abandon | | 2010 | Pierre-Yves Chatelin (FRA) | 9 Nov. - Electrical Problems | | | | | |
| RET | | GENERIK - EXP'HAIR en Beauté | | 1976 | Joris De Carlan (FRA) | 4 Nov. - | | | | | |
| RET | | Un monde bleu tout en vert Abandon | | 2004 | Christine Monlouis (FRA) | 3 Nov. - Dismasted (Towed to the Port of Brest) | | | | | |
