= Louis Duc =

French Offshore yachtsman

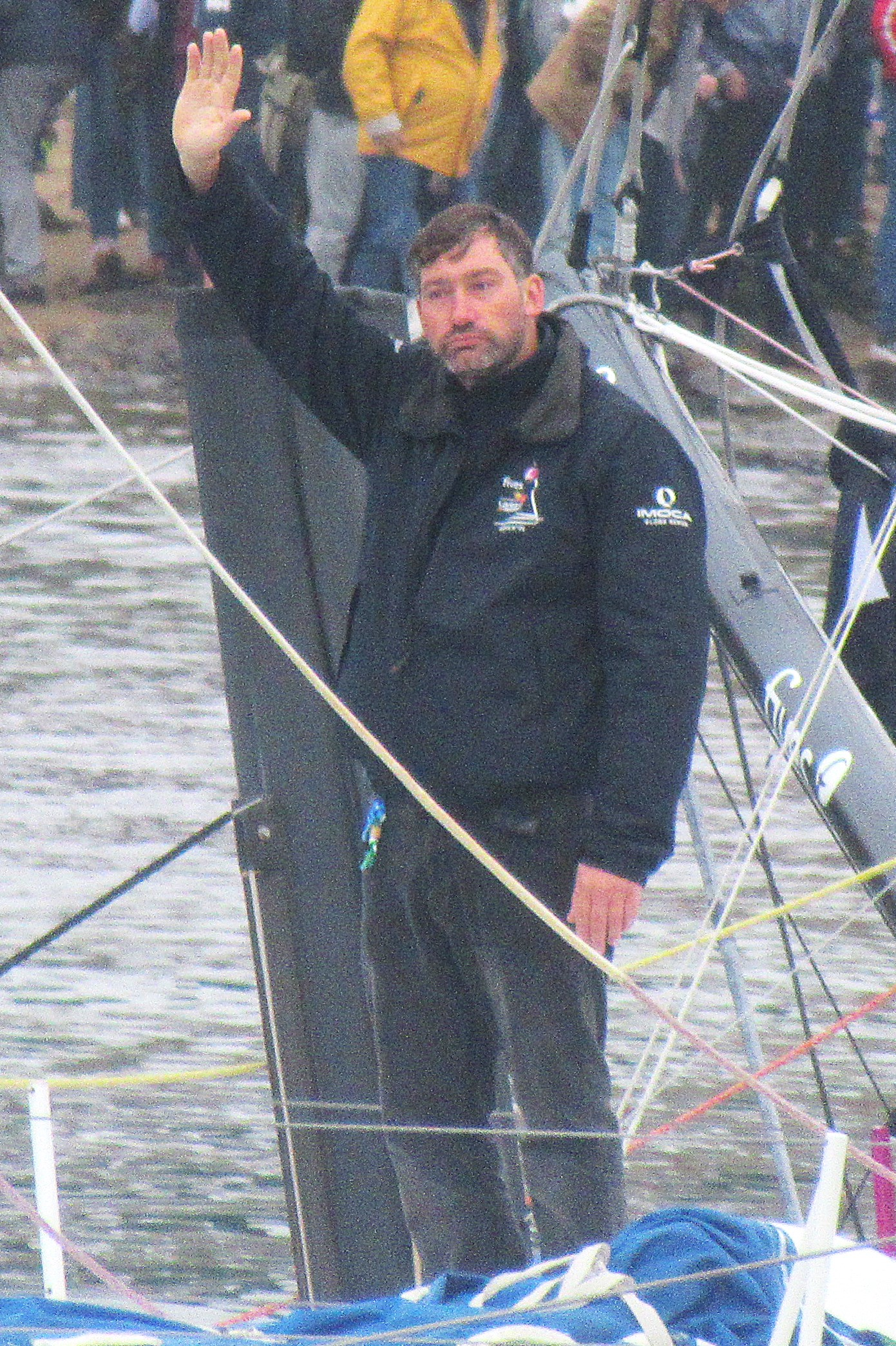
- At the start of the 2024-2025 Vendée Globe

Personal information
- Nationality: French
- Born: 18 September 1983 (age 42)
- Occupation: Offshore Sailor

Louis Duc (born 18 September 1983) is a French professional offshore sailor.

== Oceanic/Offshore Sailing ==
Pos	Year	Race	Class	Boat name	Time	Notes	Ref
Round the world races
TBC / 40	2024/25	2024-2025 Vendée Globe	IMOCA 60	Fives – Lantana Environnement			
Transatlantic Races
14 / 40	2023	Transat Jacques Vabre	IMOCA 60	FIVES GROUP – LANTANA ENVIRONNEMENT, FRA 172	14d 02h 21m 34s	with Rémi Aubrun (FRA)	
14 /	2021	Transat Jacques Vabre	IMOCA 60	Kostum – Lantana Paysage	21d 20h 45m 54s	with Marie Tabarly (FRA)	
5	2019	Transat Jacques Vabre	Class 40	FRA 150 – Crosscall Chamonix Mont-Blanc; Lift 40	18d 15h 25m 23s	with Aurélien Ducroz (FRA)	
ABN	2017	Transat Jacques Vabre	Class 40	150 – Carac; Lift 40	Abandoned	with Alexis Loison (FRA)	
3 /	2015	Transat Jacques Vabre	Class 40	65 – Carac Advanced Energies; Akilaria Mk2 (Proto)	25d 21h 29m 52s	with Christophe Lebas (FRA)	
10 /	2013	Transat Jacques Vabre	Class 40	65 – Phoenix Europe; Akilaria Mk2 (Proto)	23d 02h 40m 07s	with Stéphanie Alran (FRA)	
22 /	2007	Transat Jacques Vabre	Class 40	20 – Commerce équitable Pogo 40S1	25d 01h 17m 25s	withJean-Edouard Criquioche (FRA)	
27 / 38	2022	2022 Route du Rhum	IMOCA 60	Fives – Lantana Environnement, FRA 172	15d 05h 54m 07s		
Other Races
