= Andrea Mura =

Italian politician

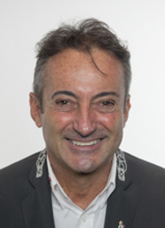

Member of the Chamber of Deputies
- In office 23 March 2018 – 27 September 2018
- Constituency: Sardinia

Personal details
- Born: 13 September 1964 (age 61) Cagliari, Sardinia, Italy

Andrea Mura (born 13 September 1964) is an Italian sailor and former politician.

== Sporting career ==
- 1971 IYRU Youth Sailing World Championships
- 2010 Route du Rhum
- 2014 Route du Rhum
- 2018 Route du Rhum
- 2023-2024 Global Solo Challenge

== Political career ==
Mura was expelled from the Five Star Movement in July 2018 for his abstentionism and he later resigned from Parliament.

== See also ==
- List of members of the Italian Chamber of Deputies, 2018–2022
