= Pierre-Antoine =

Pierre-Antoine is a given name. Notable people with the name include:

- Pierre-Antoine Bellangé (1757–1827), French furniture designer
- Pierre-Antoine Cousteau (1906–1958), French far right polemicist and journalist
- Pierre-Antoine Dorion (c. 1789 – 1850), businessman and political figure in Lower Canada
- Pierre-Antoine Lebrun (1785–1873), French poet
- Pierre-Antoine Tabeau (1782–1835), Roman Catholic priest and vicar general in New France (now Quebec)

== See also ==
- Pierre Antoine
- Stade Pierre-Fabre, a multi-use stadium known as Stade Pierre-Antoine until September 2017
