= Yann Rocherieux =

French yacht racer

Yann Rocherieux (born 13 January 1983) is a French yacht racer who competed in the 2008 Summer Olympics in the skiff event with Emmanuel Dyen, finishing 10th.
