= Pierre Antoine =

Pierre Antoine may refer to:

- Pierre Antoine Deblois (1815–1898), Quebec farmer, businessman and political figure
- Pierre Antoine Delalande (1787–1823), French naturalist and explorer
- Pierre Antoine Marie Crozy (1831–1903), French canna and rose breeder
- Peter Anthony Motteux, born Pierre Antoine Motteux (1663–1718), English translator and dramatist
- Pierre Daru (1767–1829), French soldier, statesman, historian and poet
- Pierre Antoine Poiteau (1766–1854), French botanist, gardener and botanical artist

== See also ==
- Antoine Pierre
- Pierre-Antoine
