= Morgan Lagravière =

French offshore sailor and navigator

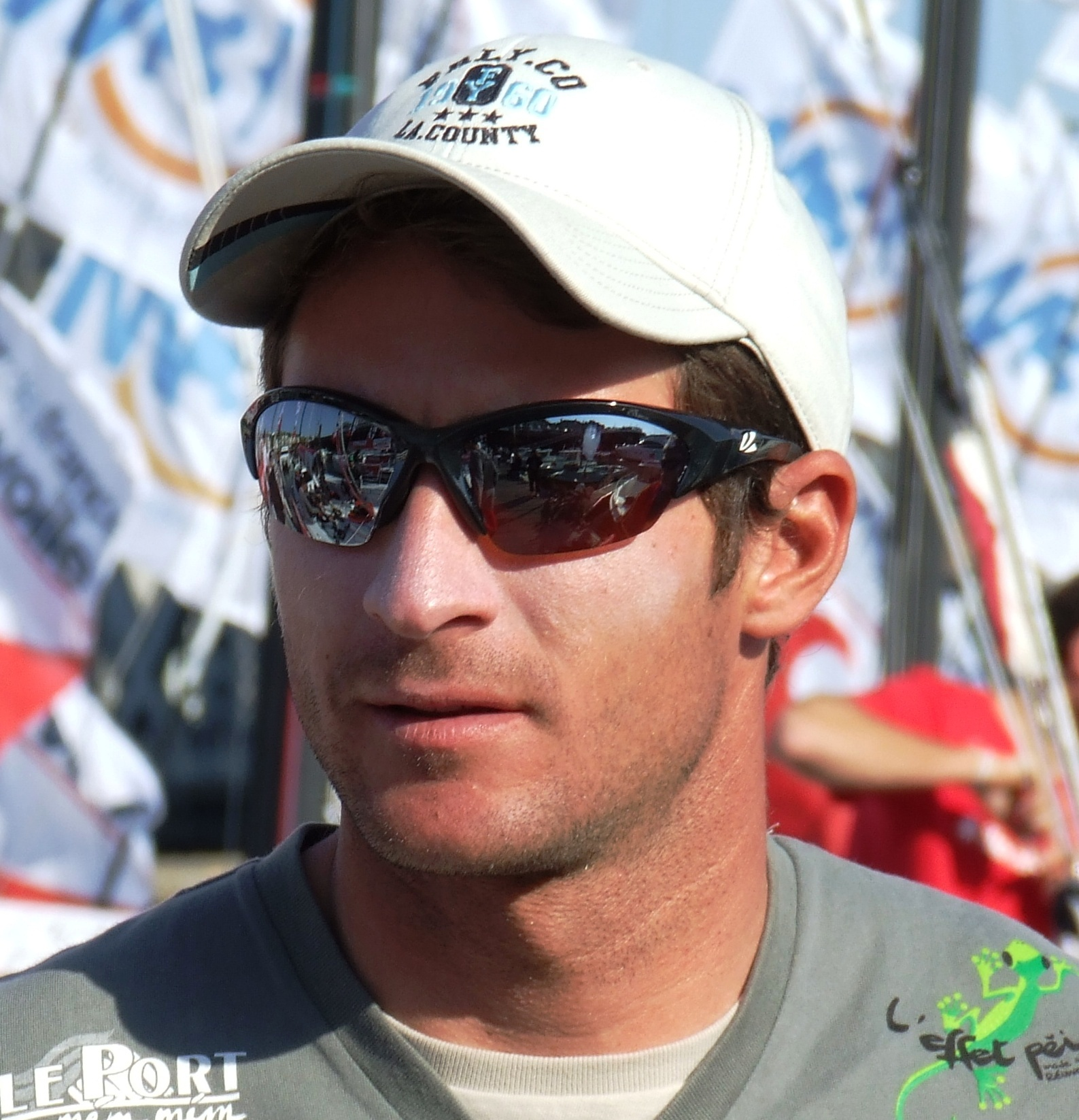

Personal information
- Nationality: French
- Born: 23 May 1987 (age 39) Réunion

Sailing career
- Sport: Sailing

Morgan Lagravière (born 23 May 1987 in Réunion) is a French professional sailor who was a member of the National Olympic squad before progressing into offshore sailing.

== Sailing background ==
He comes from a dinghy sailing background from posium position the 420 Worlds he moved into the 49er class ending up as the reserve pair for the 2008 Summer Olympics together with Stéphane Christidis.

In 2014 he joined the Safran Sailing Team, taking over from Marc Guillemot after the 2014 Route du Rhum. Since 5 March 2015, he has been the skipper of the 60-foot IMOCA Safran II, the first IMOCA to be fitted with hydrofoils. With the assistance of Roland Jourdain, whose company Kairos manages the Safran project, he prepared to compete in the eighth edition of the 2016-2017 Vendée Globe on 6 November 2016. However, after 18 days of racing while in 4th place, he was forced to retire due to saffron damage sustained after hitting an unidentified floating object. After 12 years in the sport, Saffran pulled out of sailing sponsorship. He then tried to put together for the next Vendée Globe campaign, again with Roland Jourdain, but failed to secure the funding and ended up helping Isobel Joske's IMOCA campaign. He got back into the figaro sailing and joined the Gitana team as a helm trimmer for their 2020/2021 Jules Verne record attempts.

== Career highlights ==
Year	Pos.	Event	Class	Boat name	Notes	Ref.
2025	1	2025 Transat Cafe-L'Or	IMOCA 60	Charal 2	with Jérémie Beyou	
2020	28	Formula Kite European Championships	Formula Kite	-	held in Puck, POL	
2019	2	Tour de Bretagne à la Voile		Breizh Cola / Equithé	with Gildas Mahé	
2018	2	Transat AG2R	Bénéteau Figaro	Brittany - CMB Performance	with Sébastien Simon	
2016	RET	2016-2017 Vendée Globe	IMOCA 60	Saffran (3)	Abandoned after 18 days	
2016	RET	New York – Vendée (Les Sables d’Olonne) Race	IMOCA 60	Saffran (3)	Collision	
2014	12	Formula 18 World Championship	Formula 18	-	held in Bangor, NI	
2013	3	Solitaire du Figaro on Vendée	Bénéteau Figaro		winner of the 3rd stage	
2011	8/41	Solitaire du Figaro	Bénéteau Figaro			
2011	6	Generali Solo	Bénéteau Figaro		he won 3 out of 12 legs	
2011	1	Tour of Brittany	Bénéteau Figaro	VENDEE	with Gildas Mahé	
2010	13	49er World Championship	49er Skiff	-	crewed by Yann Rocherieux held in Freeport, BAH	
2009	22	49er World Championship	49er Skiff	FRA 1071	crewed by Yann Rocherieux held in Riva del Garda, ITA	
2009	6	49er European Championship	49er Skiff	-	crewed by Yann Rocherieux	
2008	20	49er World Championship	49er Skiff	Rougail River	crewed by Stéphane Christidis held in Melbourne, AUS	
2007	4	49er European Championship	49er Skiff	-	crewed by Stéphane Christidis	
2007	7	ISAF Sailing World Championships	49er Skiff	-	crewed by Stéphane Christidis held in Cascais, POR	
2005	42	49er World Championship	49er Skiff	-	crewed by Delpech Noi held in Moscow, RUS	
2005	4	Mumm 30 World Championship	Farr 30	-	held in with La Trinite, FRA	
2003	3	420 Class World Championships	420	-	with Noe Delpech held in Hayling Island (GBR)	
2002	3	420 Class World Championships	420	-	with Noe Delpech held in Tavira (POR)	

== Gallery ==
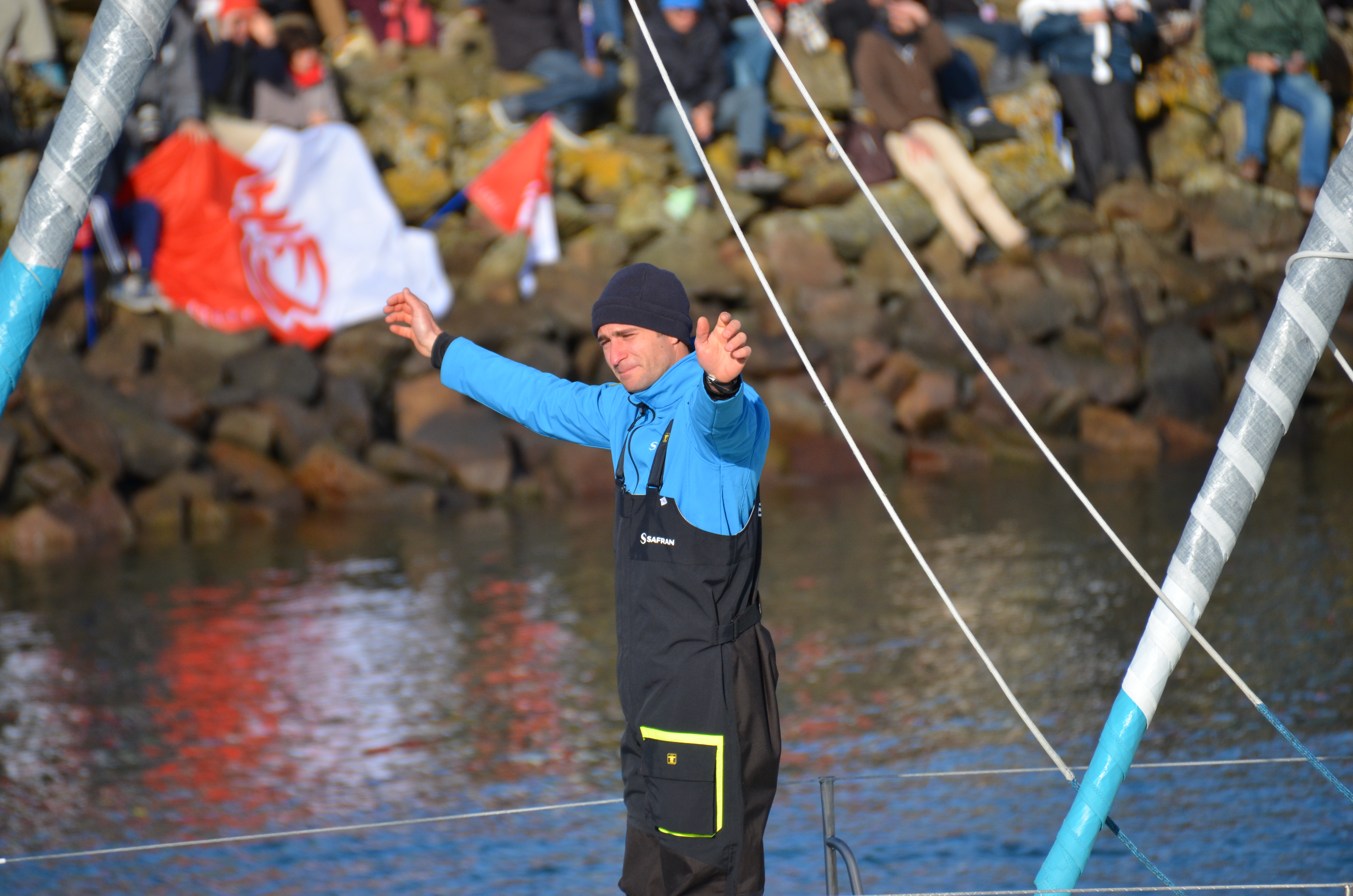

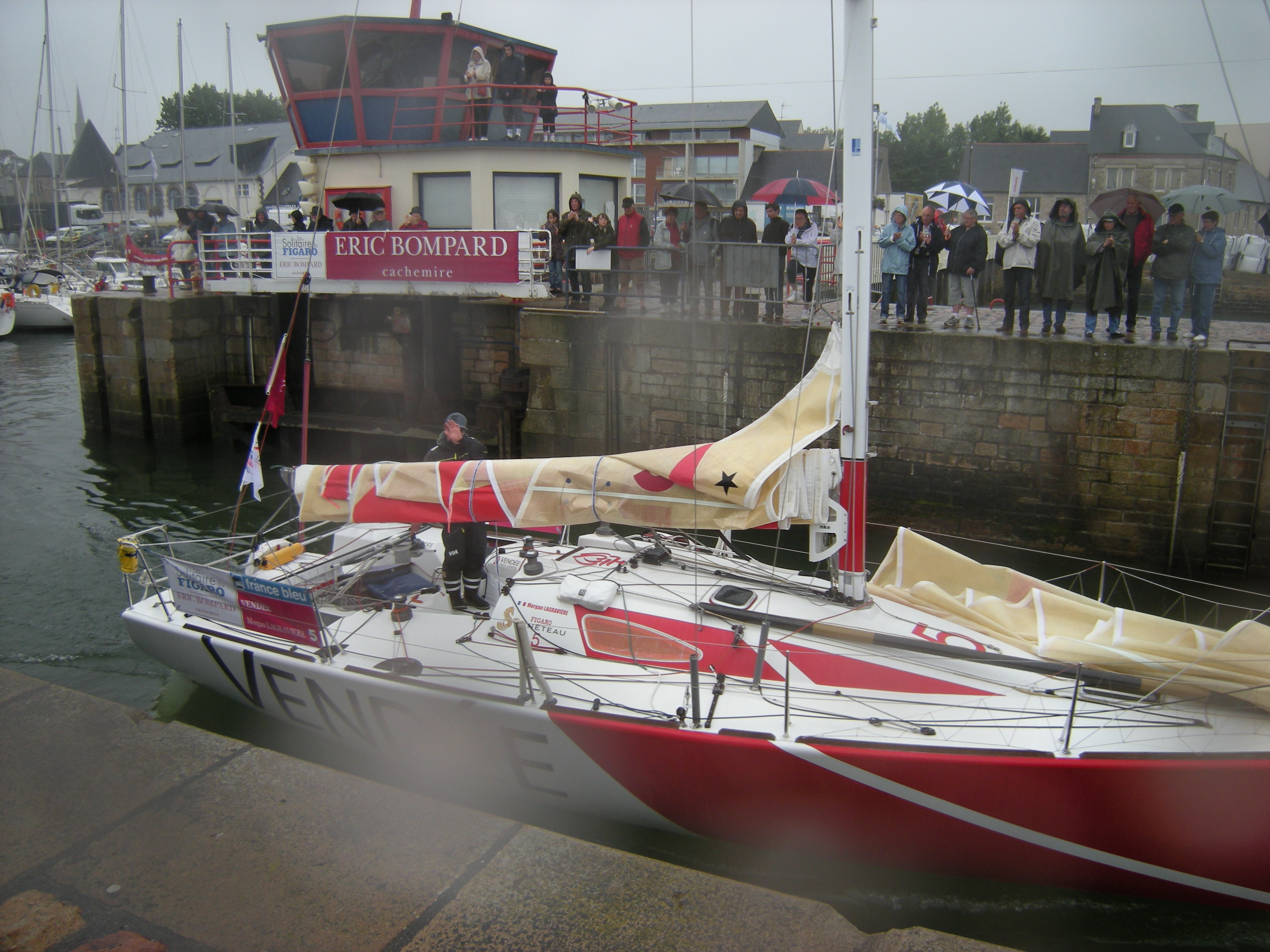

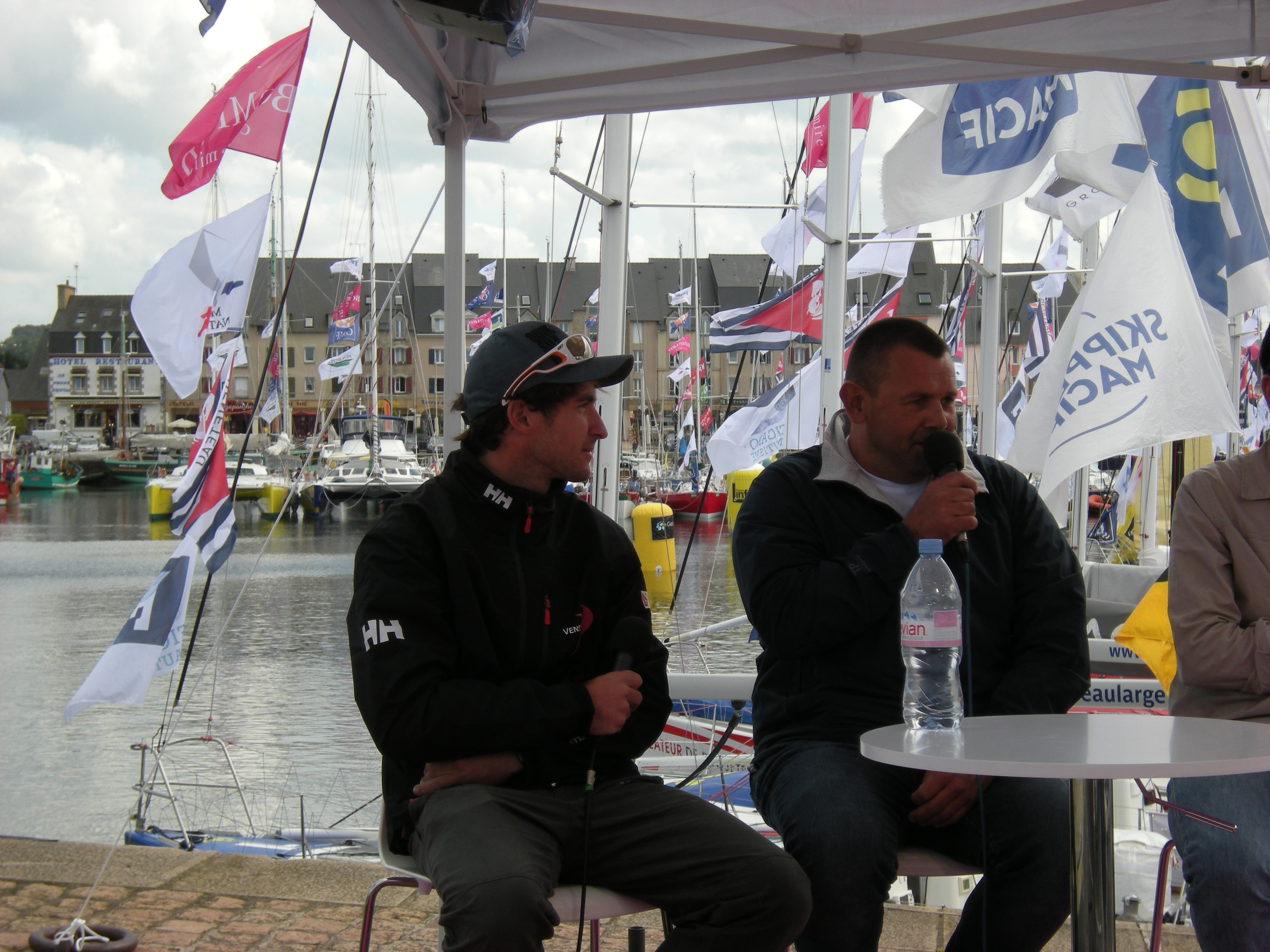

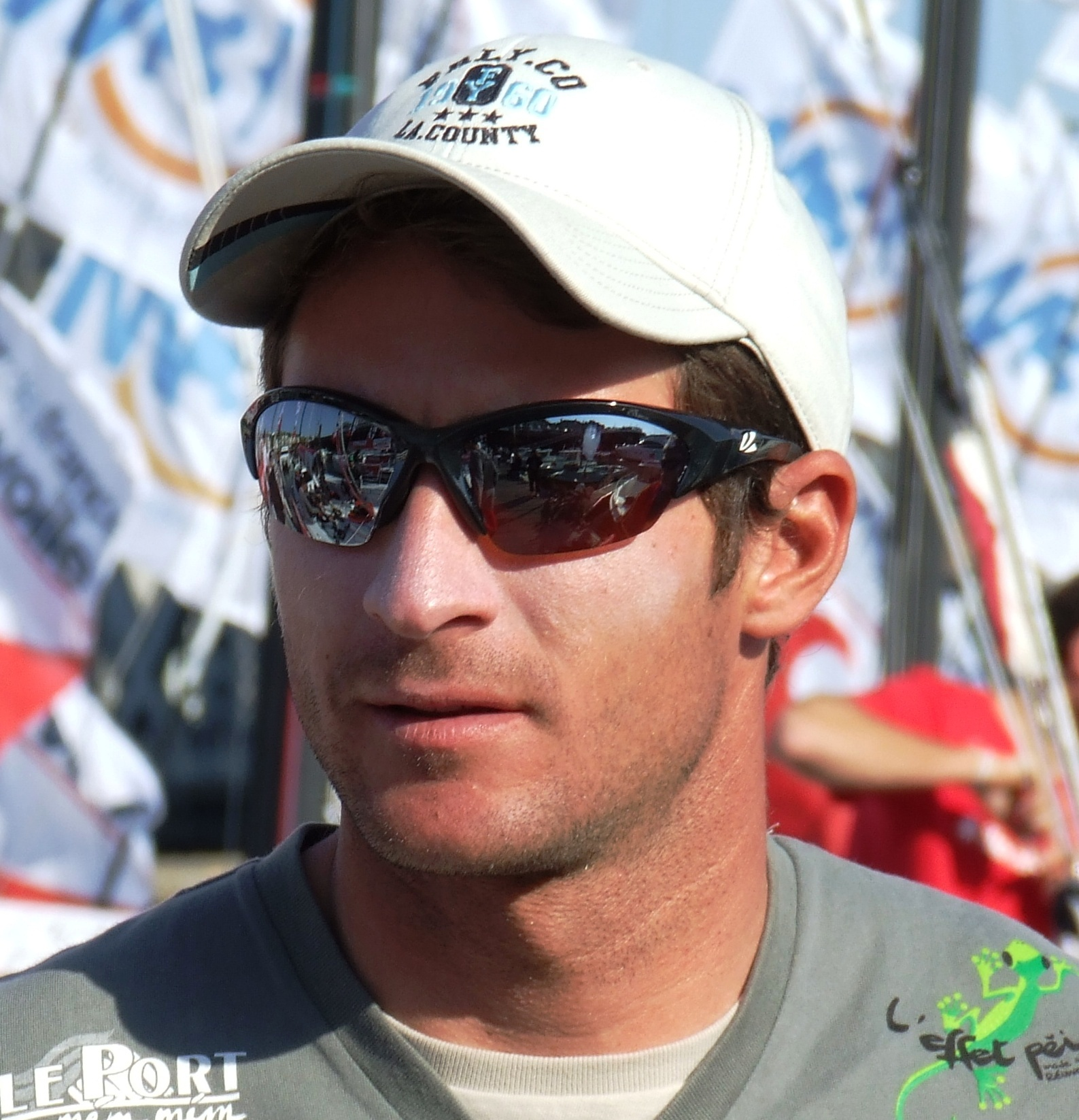

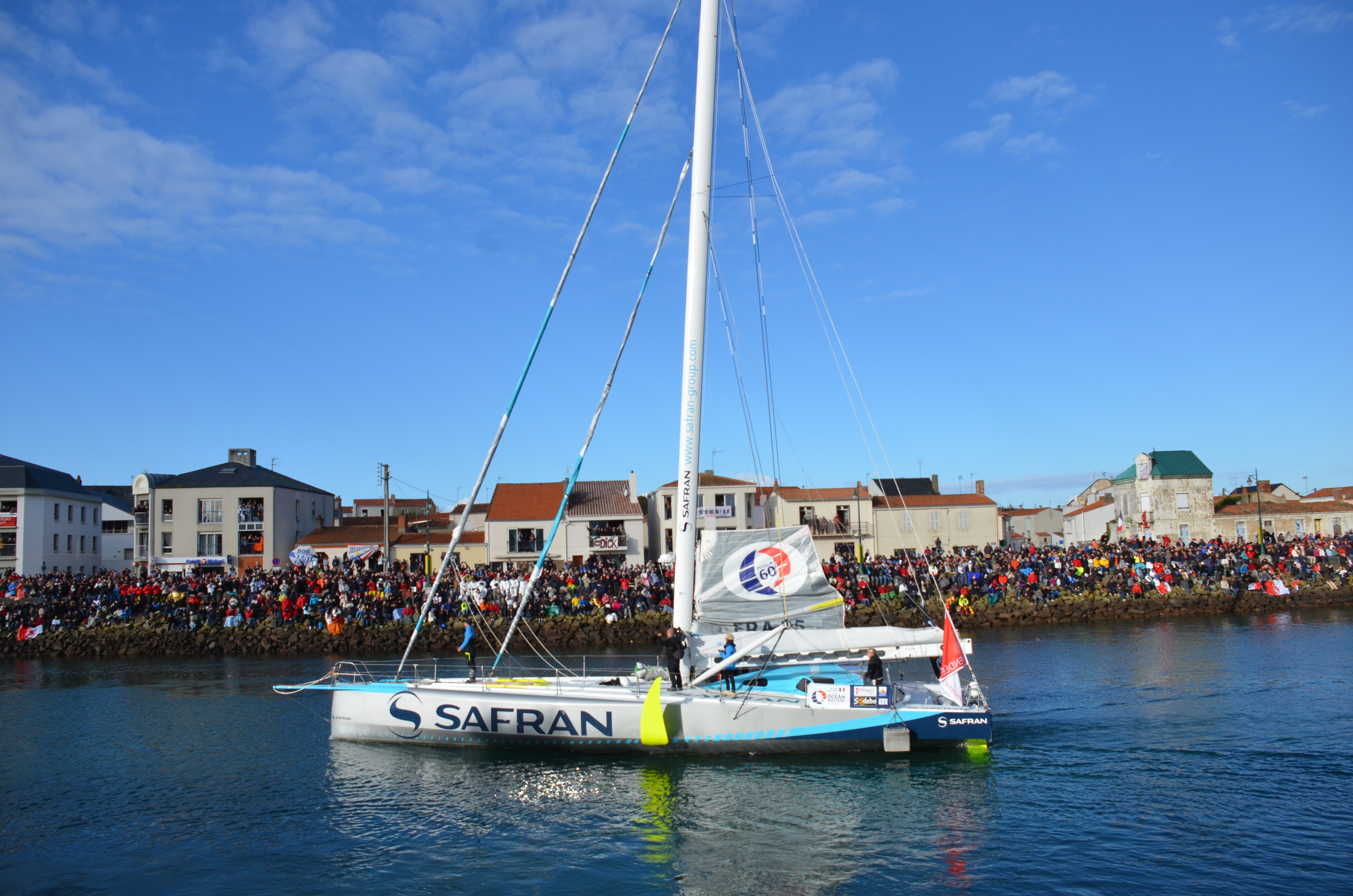

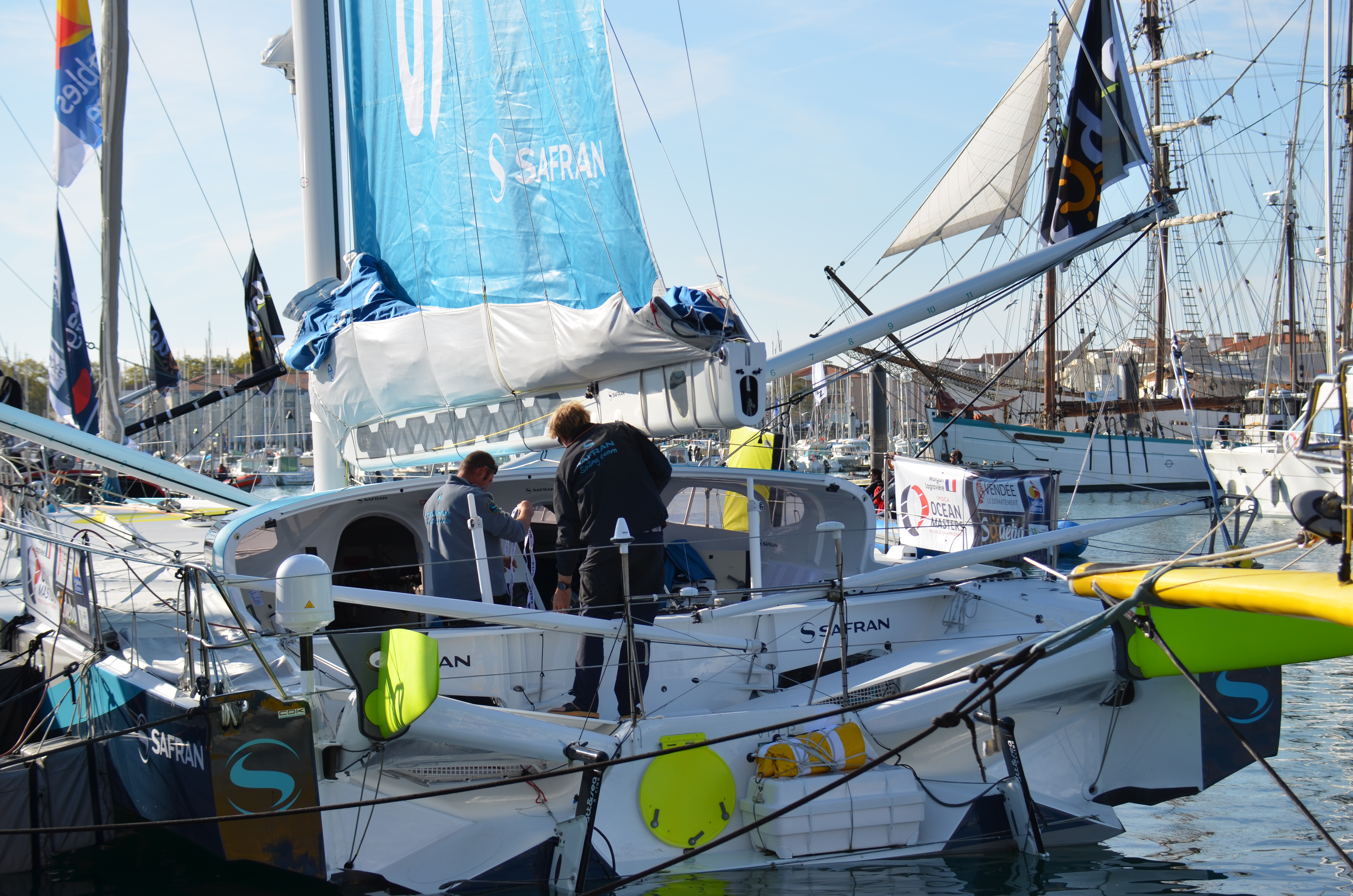
