= IMOCA 60 Foncia 2 =

Foncia 2
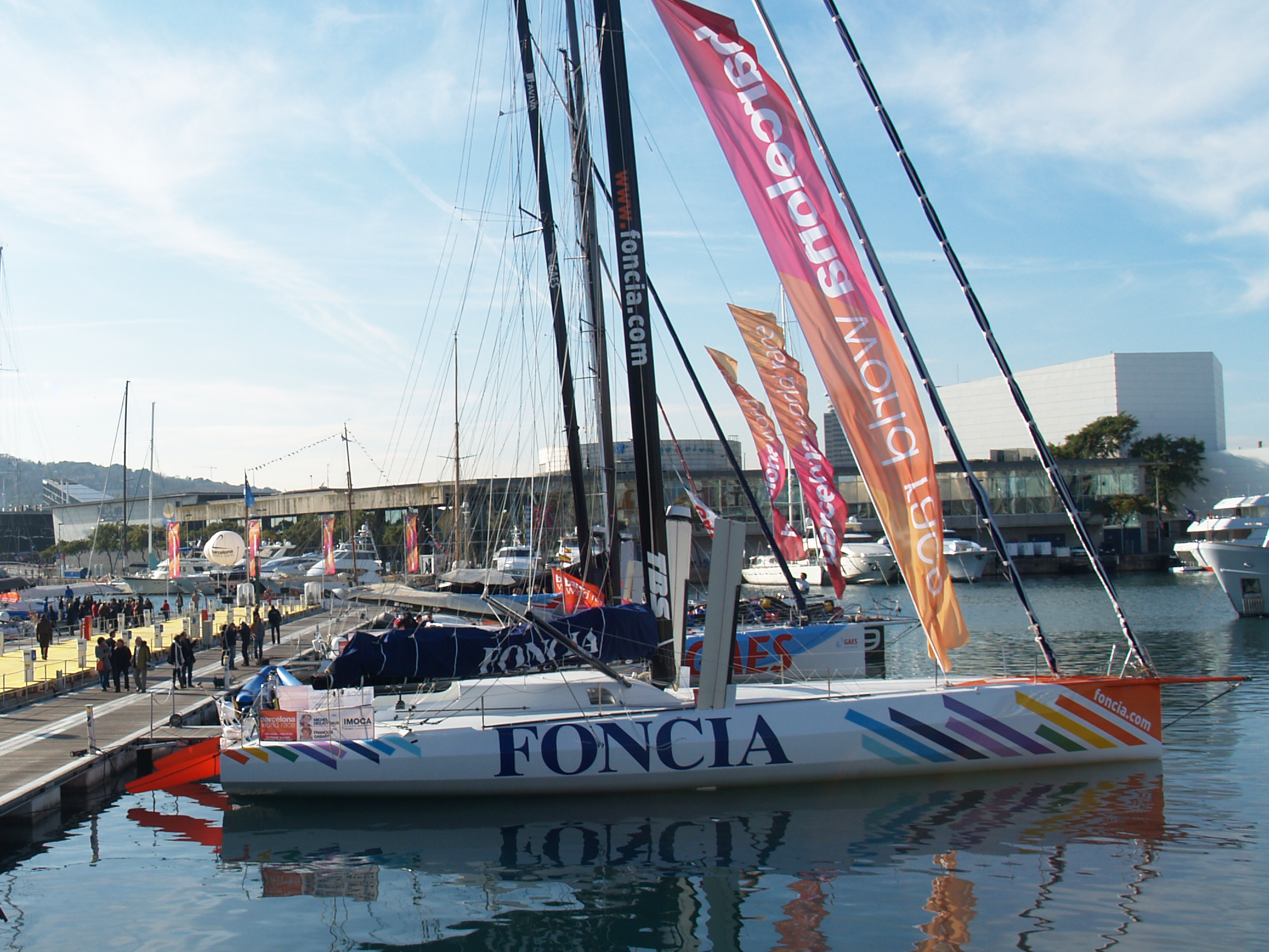

Development
- Designer: VPLP design and Guillaume Verdier
- Year: 20 September 2010
- Builders: JMV Industries (Cherbourg); Green Marine (Lymington); CDK Technologies (Port-la-Forêt)
- Name: Foncia 2

Hull
- Construction: Carbon Nomex
- LOH: 60 ft (18 m)

Hull appendages
- General: Twin daggerboard Retrofitted with Hydrofoils
- Keel: Canting Keel
- Ballast: Water Ballast

Racing
- Class association: IMOCA 60

Foncia 2 is a IMOCA 60 class offshore racing monohull sailing yacht launched in 2010.

== Construction and modifications ==
The boat was designed by Guillaume Verdier, VPLP design (Marc Van Peteghem and Vincent Lauriot-Prévost) with significant input also from Michel Desjoyeaux. It is an innovative hull, marked by a double chain and a bridge in "seagull wing", as well as bearing drifts. This sailboat is a second generation VPLP design. The boat was launched on a tight schedule, on 20 September 2010, just six months after the start of the project, at a cost of 3 million euros.

The tight timescale was made possible by the collaboration build effort consisting of the Green Marine shipyards in Lymington GBR and JMV Industries in Cherbourg (FRA). Green Marine made the plug and the moulded the hull and JMV the made the deck. The boat was assembled at the CDK Technologies site in Port-la-Forêt led by Hubert Desjoyeaux who is the brother Michel Desjoyeaux.

After several months of study, the boat went back to CDK Technologies over the winter of 2015–2016 were the daggerboards were replaced by hydrofoils.

== 2010–2011 – FRA 101 – Foncia II ==
=== Results summary ===
6th – 2010 – Route du Rhum with Michel Desjoyeaux in a time of 15 days, 17 hours and 29 minutes;
RET – 2010–2011 – Barcelona World Race with Michel Desjoyeaux and François Gabart;

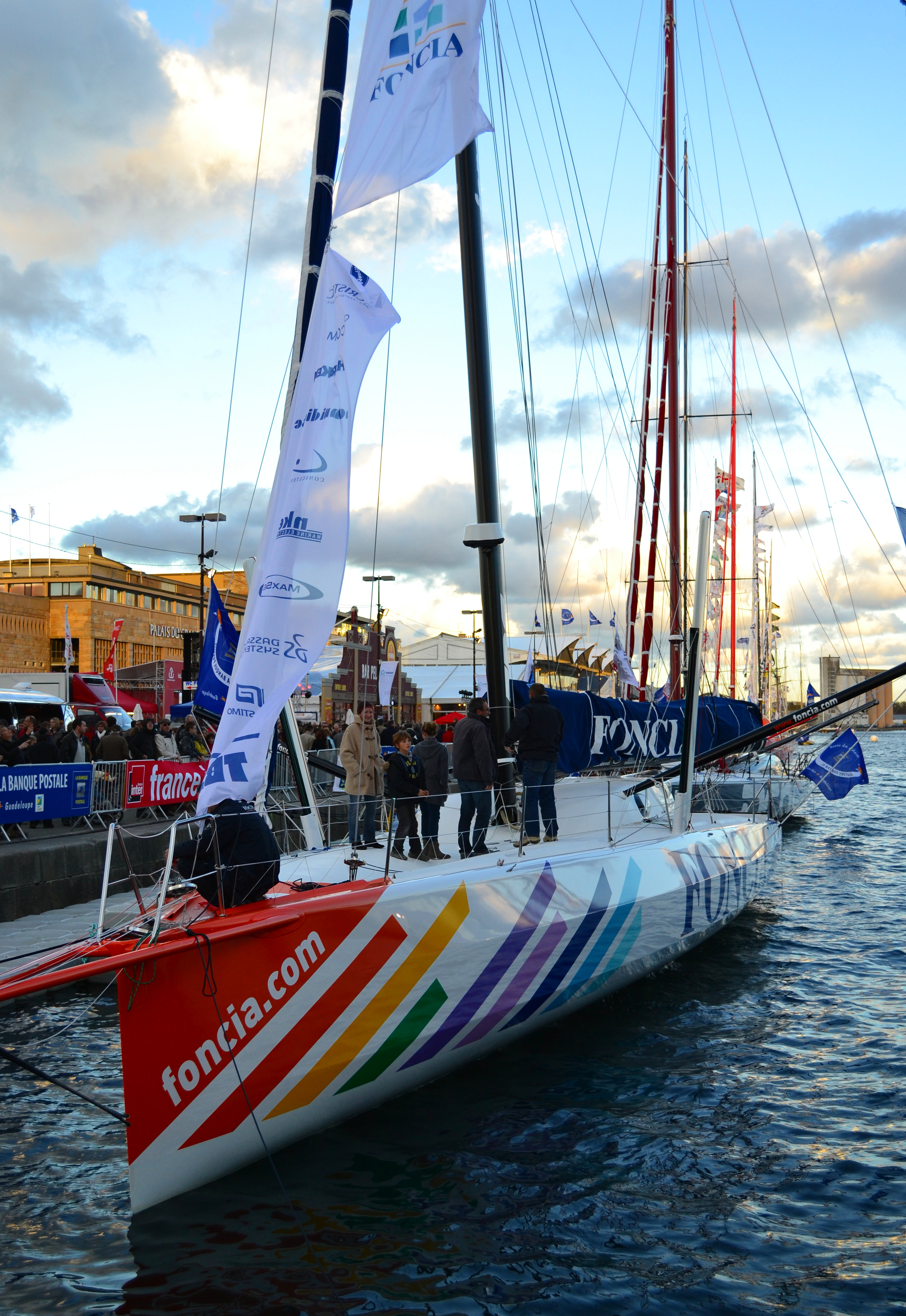

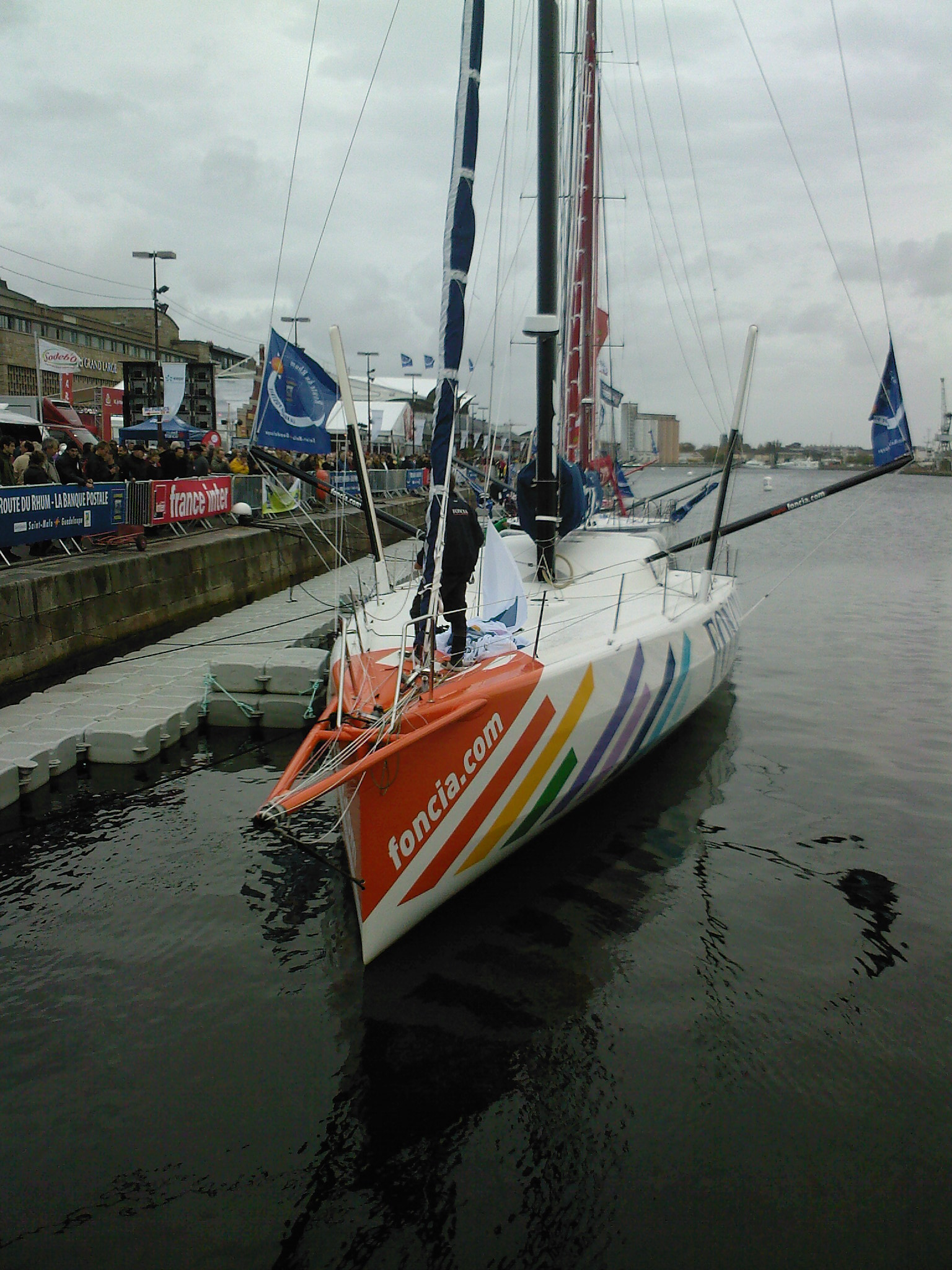

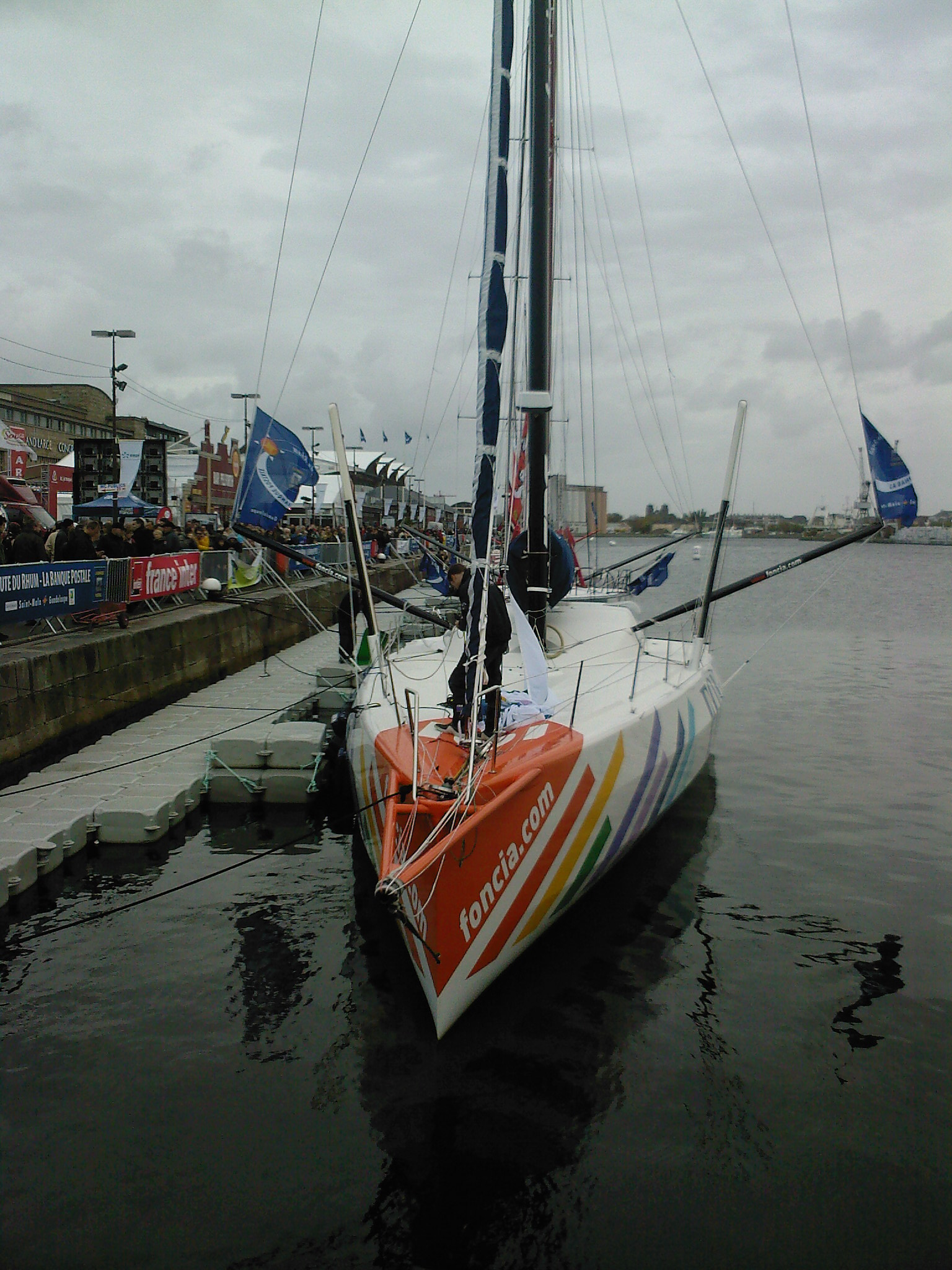

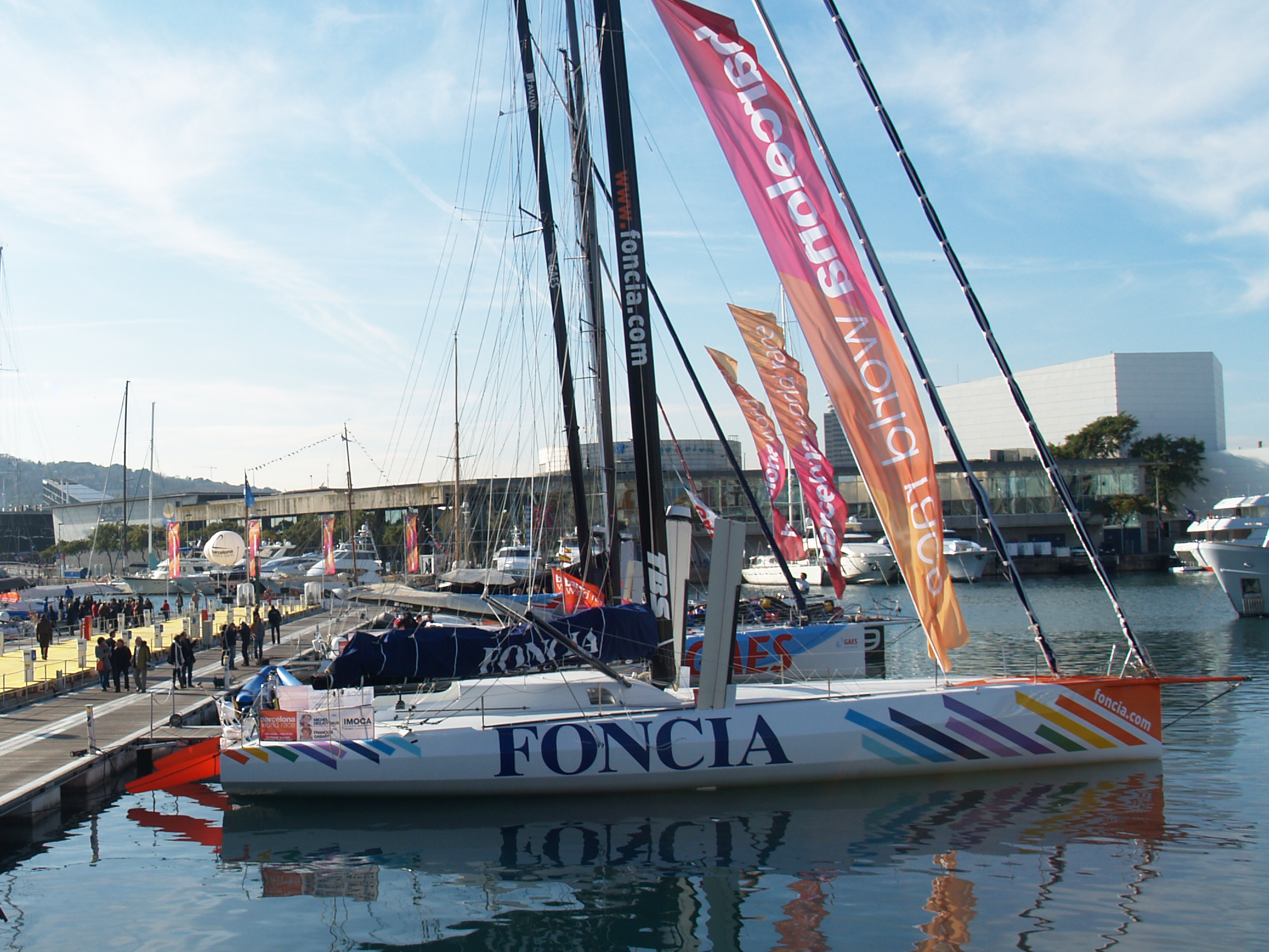

== 2011–2013 – FRA 19 – Banque Populaire ==
=== Results summary ===
3rd – 2011 – Transat Jacques-Vabre with Armel Le Cléac'h and Christopher Pratt in a time of 16 days and 15 hours;
2nd – 2011 – Transat B to B Race, with Armel Le Cléac'h in 9 days, 13 hours and 8 minutes;
3rd – 2012 – Europa Warm'Up with Armel Le Cléac'h;
2nd – 2012-2013 – Vendée Globe with Armel Le Cléac'h in 78 days, 5 hours and 33 minutes;

== 2013–2017 – FRA 19 – Maître CoQ III ==
=== Results summary ===
2nd – 2013 – Rolex Fastnet Race with Jérémie Beyou and Christopher Pratt in 2 days 19 hours and 23 minutes;
3rd – 2013 – Transat Jacques-Vabre with Jérémie Beyou and Christopher Pratt in 17 days, 5 hours and 15 minutes;
2nd – 2014 – Route du Rhum with Jérémie Beyou in 12 days, 12 hours and 11 minutes;
1st – 2016 – Transat New York-Vendée with Jérémie Beyou in 9 days, 16 hours, 57 minutes and 49 seconds;
3rd – 2016-2017 – Vendée Globe with Jérémie Beyou in 78 days, 6 hours 38 minutes 40 seconds;

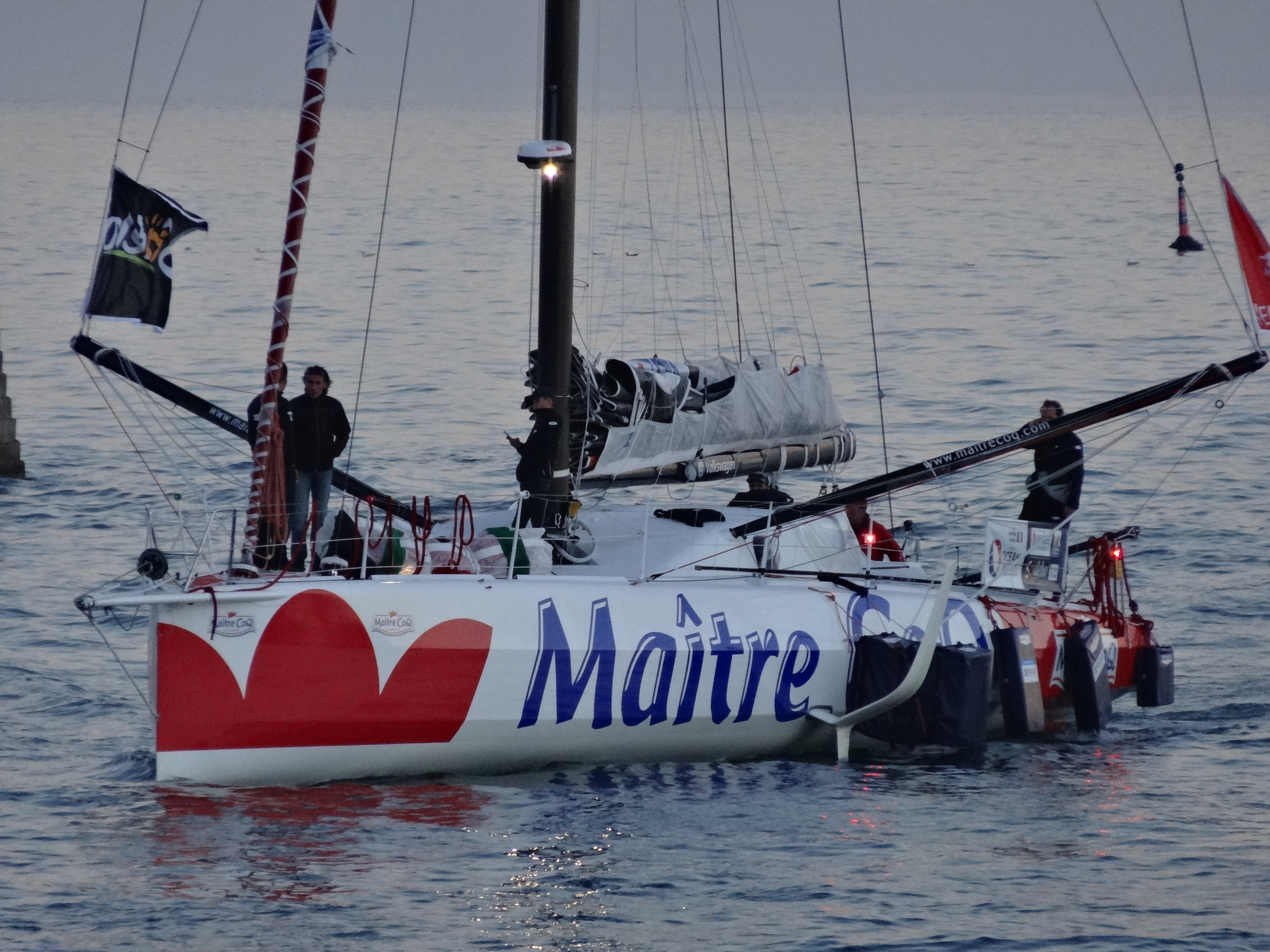

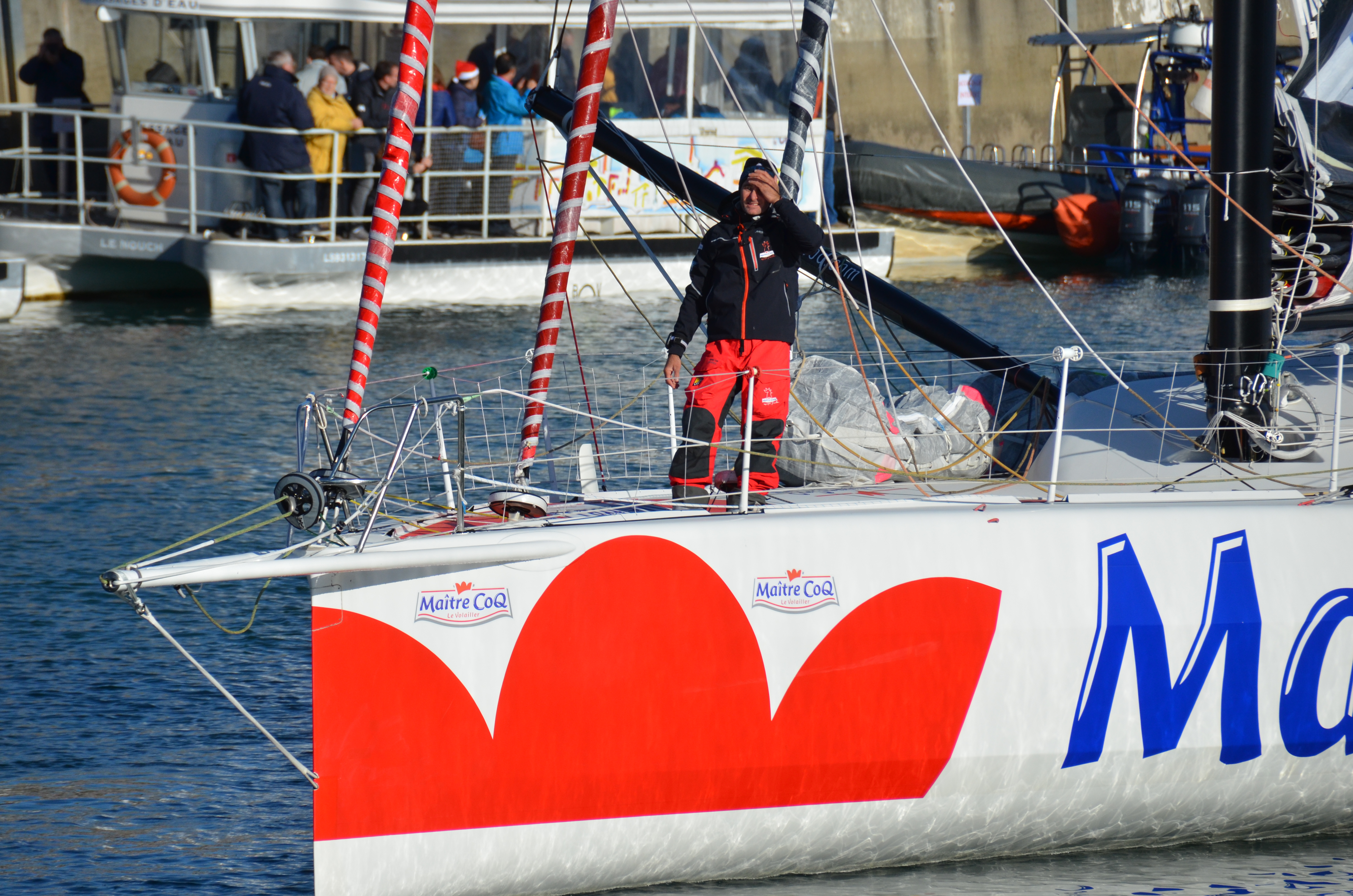

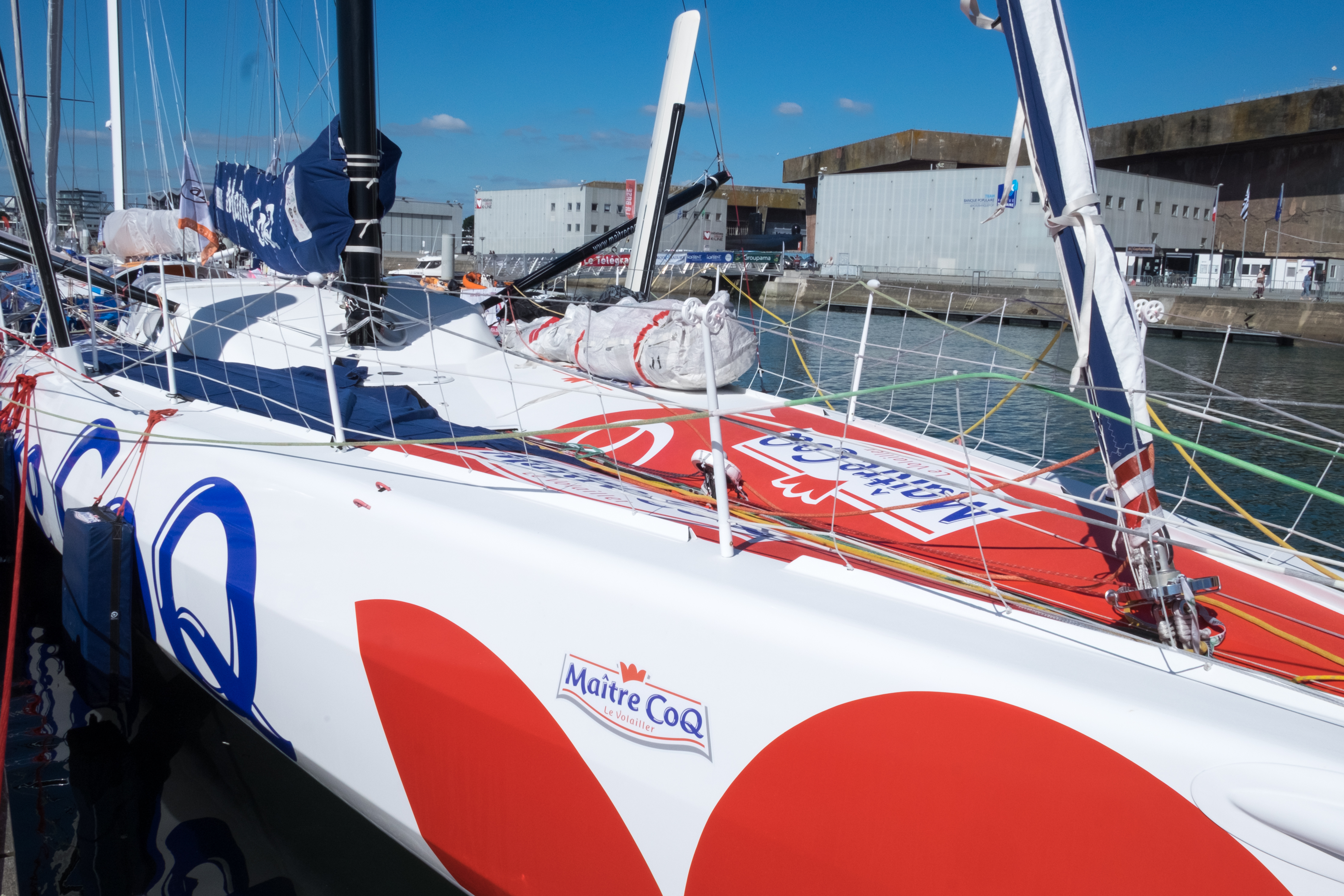

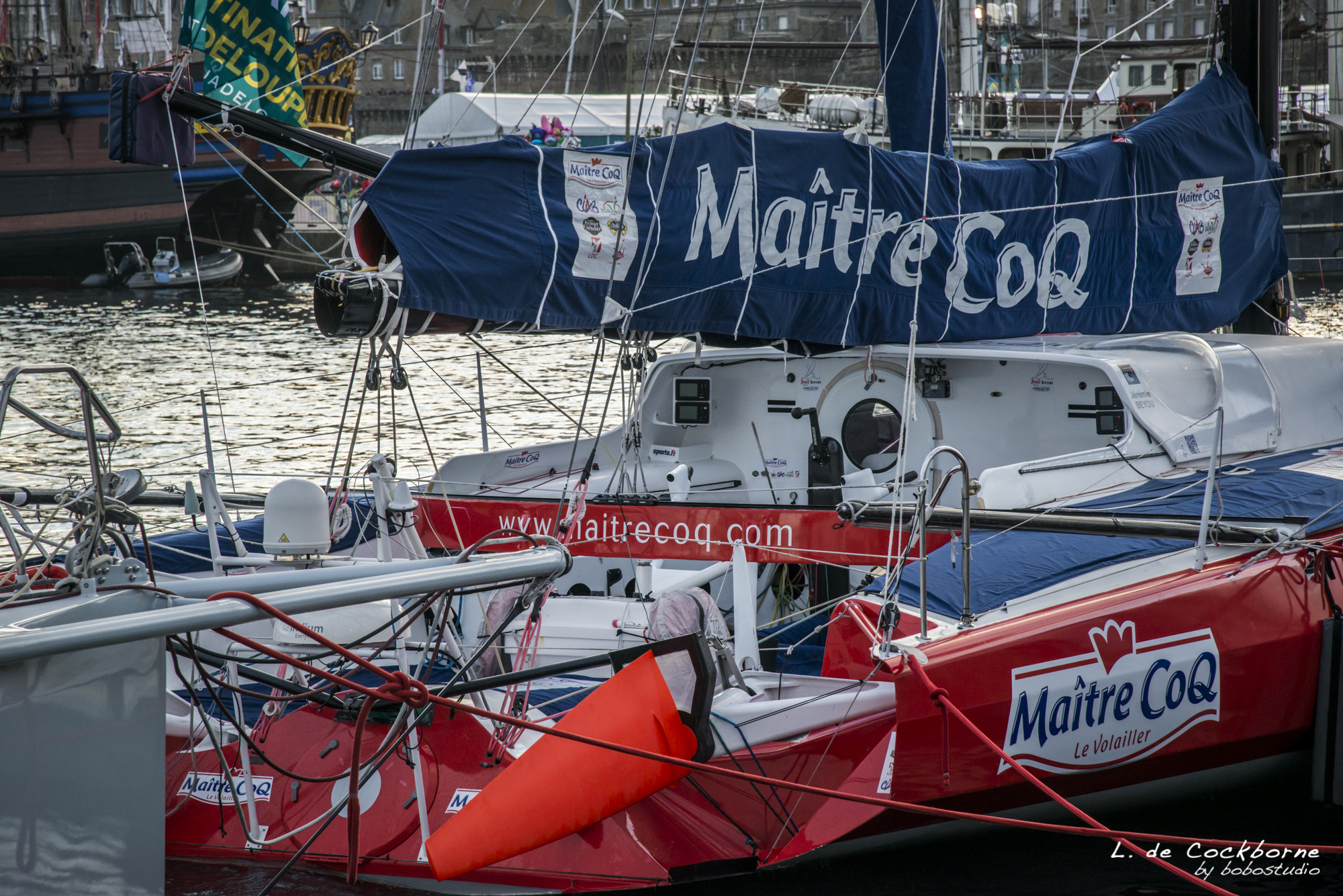

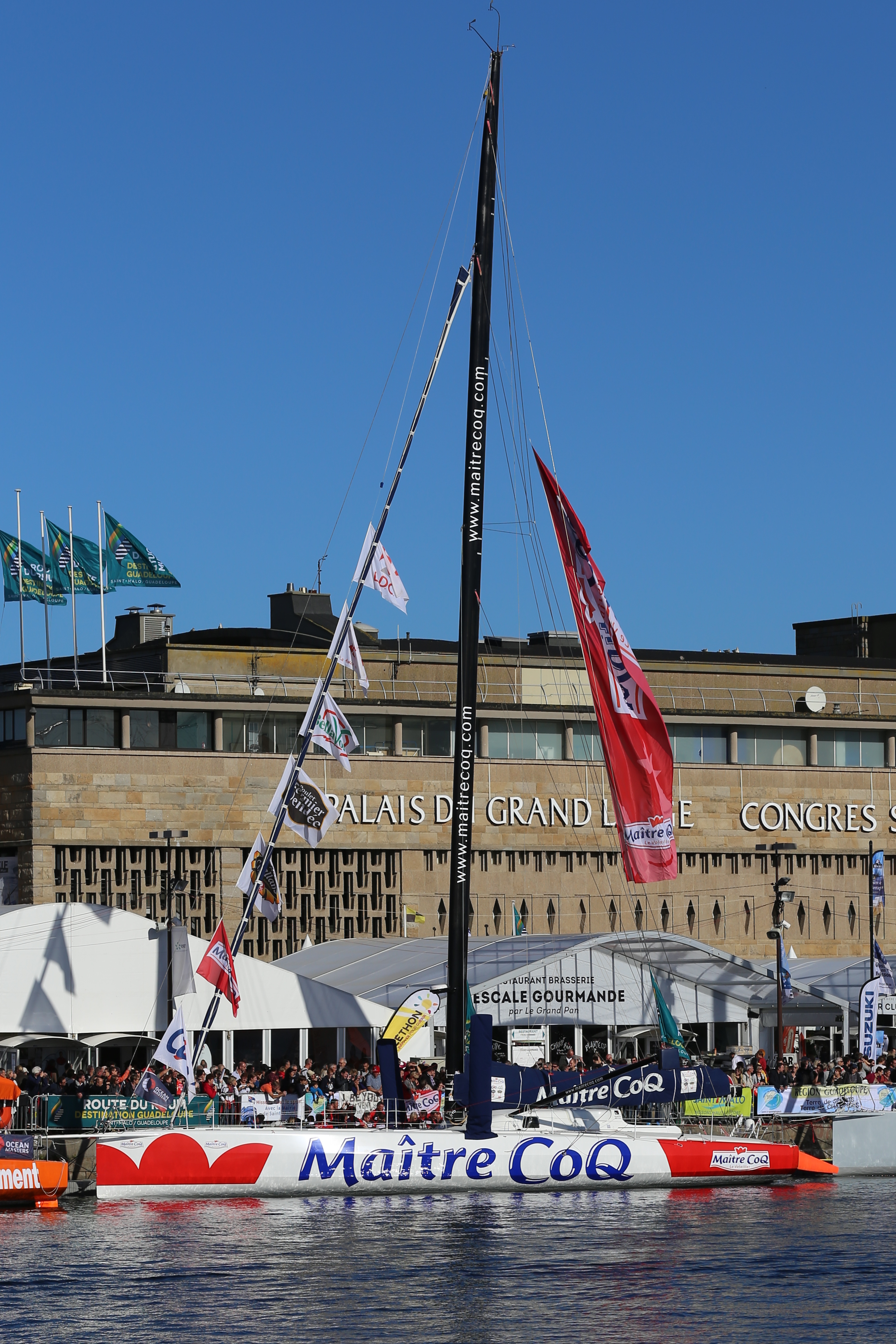

== 2017–2022 – Initiatives-Cœur (3) ==
=== Results summary ===
3rd – 2017 – Armen Race with Tanguy de Lamotte;
7th – 2019 – Transat Jacques-Vabre with Samantha Davies and Paul Meilhat;
4th – 2020 – Vendée Arctique with Samantha Davies;
DNF – 2020-2021 – Vendée Globe with Samantha Davies keel damage force a repair in cape town although the boat carried on;

=== 2020–2021 Vendée Globe ===
On December 2, 2020, at 7 p.m. (universal time), in the roaring 40s, more than 300 miles from the Cape of Good Hope, Samantha Davies sailed was sailing between 15 and 22 knots, in a wind of 30 knots in 11th place in the race. Suddenly, the boat hits an unidentified floating object and stopped in a brutal manner. She hears cracks and was thrown around the inside of the boat along with the meal she was preparing. As a result, she suffered bruising.

The cracks in the longitudinal in the keel structure surrounding the keel ram and potential damage to the fin and ram itself made it unsafe to enter the Southern Ocean with repair and inspection. So Samantha Davies diverted to Cape Town while options were considered she arrived on 5 December where she retired from the race. She then made the decision to carry on with her round the world voyage.

== 2021 – present - La Mie Câline ==
Arnaud Boissières acquired the ship in 2021.

=== Results summary ===
12th – 2022 – Guyader Bermudes;
DNF – 2022 – Vendée Arctique;
