= Marie Tabarly =

Marie Tabarly (born 1 January 1984) is a French professional yacht sailor based in Lorient, France, in Brittany. She is the daughter of Éric Tabarly, who died while sailing in the Irish Sea in 1998. Marie originally had a career as an equine behaviourist but put it on hold after her horse got injured and decided to focus on sailing instead. She has a long history of sailing many different yachts from a young age, such as Geronimo, for which she was named as the boat's godmother at its christening; the French trimaran which has since broken many records, such as with Olivier de Kersauson.

She primarily sails Pen Duick VI, a 73 ft ketch built for Eric Tabarly’s 1973–1974 Whitbread Round the World Race. In 2018, she embarked on a four-year round the world trip on Pen Duick VI through her project, the Elemen'Terre Project. This project was a sailing journey around the world that became a documentary series focused on reconnecting humans with nature through sailing, arts, and outdoor sports. Throughout the journey, many ambassadors joined, such as Yann Tiersen, the writer Sylvain Tesson, the sailor Franck Cammas and the freediver Aurore Asso. She will race Pen Duick VI in the Ocean Globe Race (OGR) in 2023.

Prior to the OGR, she raced alongside Louis Duc in the Transat Jacques Vabre.

== Accomplishments ==
Marie Tabarly is five time winner of the 15M JI Championship: in 2011, 2013, 2014, 2016 and 2017.
