= Marc Guillemot =

French offshore sailor

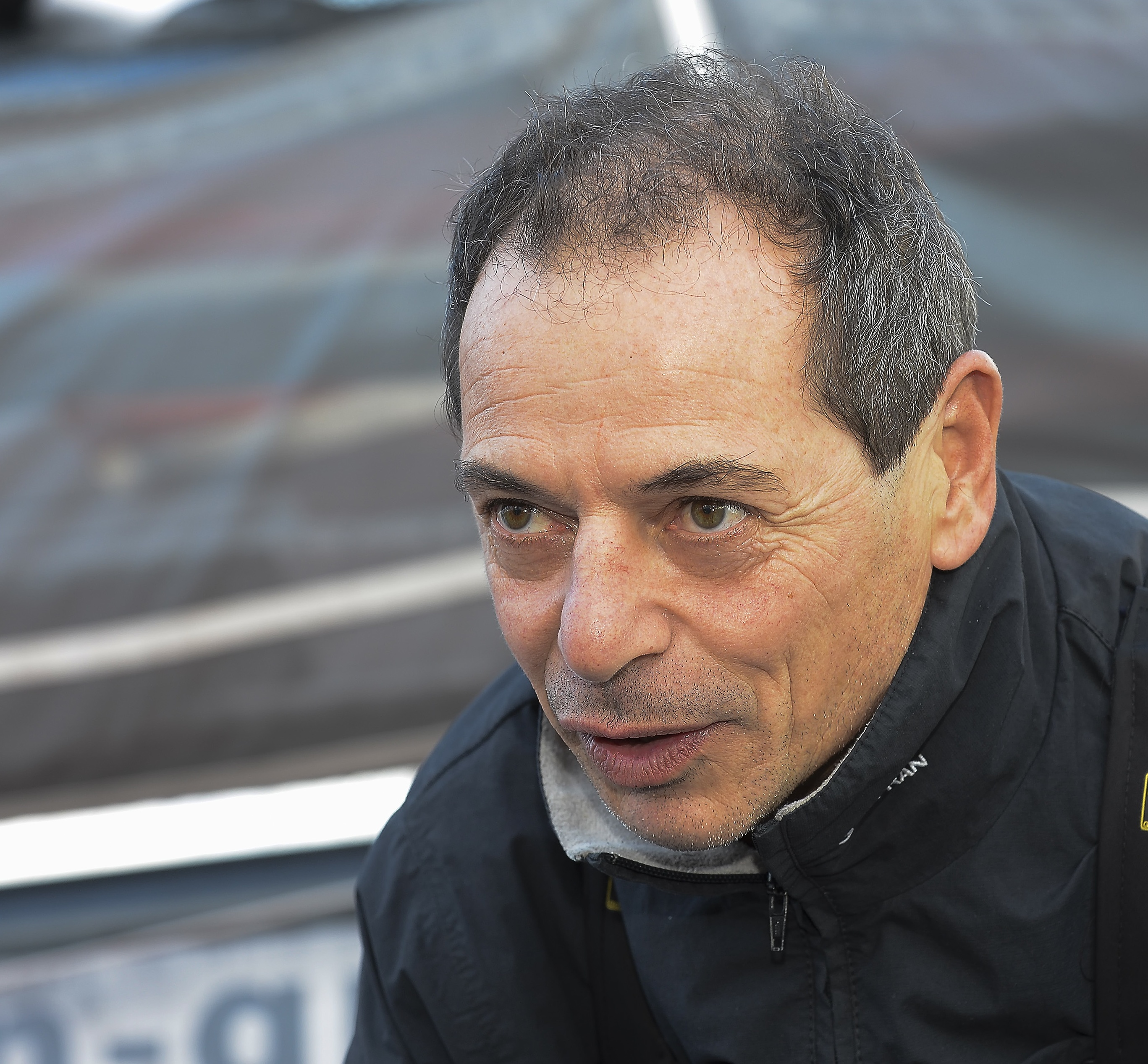

Personal information
- Born: 25 June 1959 (age 67) Quimper, France

Sailing career
- Sport: Sailing
- Classes: ORMA 60 and IMOCA 60

Marc Guillemot (French: [maʁk ɡijmo]) is a French professional offshore sailor born on 25 June 1959 in Quimper. In 2009 he was awarded knight of the order of merit.

In December 2014, during the IMOCA Ocean Masters New York to Barcelona Race, Marc Guillemot (who was sailing alongside Morgan Lagravière), was forced to retire their boat Safran, which leading the race, after Guillemot received a severe rib injury in a fall while changing sails in gale-force winds. As Guillemot was bent over with pain, Lagravière and the race organizers determined that he needed hospital treatment and Safran headed for port.

== Career highlights ==
Pos.	Year	Event	Class	Boat name	Notes	Ref.
6	2015	2015 Transat Jacques Vabre	IMOCA 60	MACSF	with Bertrand de Broc	
3	2014	2014 Route du Rhum	IMOCA 60	SAFRAN		
2	2013	2013 Transat Jacques Vabre	IMOCA 60		with Pascal Bidégorry	
DNF	2012	2012-2013 Vendee Globe	IMOCA 60	Safran	Retired Keel Damage on Day 1	
6	2011	2011 Transat Jacques Vabre	IMOCA 60		with Yann Eliès	
3	2010	2010 Route du Rhum	IMOCA 60	Safran		
1	2009	2009 Transat Jacques Vabre	IMOCA 60	Safran	with Charles Caudrelier	
3	2008	2008-2009 Vendee Globe	IMOCA 60	Safran		
1	2007	2007 Transat Jacques Vabre	IMOCA 60	Safran	with Charles Caudrelier	
7	2006	2006 Route du Rhum	IMOCA 60	Safran		
2	2002	2002 Route du Rhum	ORMA 60	Biscuiterie LA TRINITAINE		
RET	2001	2001 Transat Jacques Vabre	ORMA 60	Biscuiterie LA TRINITAINE	with Yann Guichard	
RET	1999	1999 Transat Jacques Vabre	ORMA 60	Biscuiterie LA TRINITAINE	with Jean-Luc Nélias	
4	1998	1998 Route du Rhum	ORMA 60	Biscuiterie LA TRINITAINE		
	1995	1995 Transat Jacques Vabre	ORMA 50	Groupe Larzul	with G. Chapelain	
2	1994	1994 Transat AG2R		La dairies Le Gall	with Bertrand de Broc	
