= Tom Dolan =

Tom Dolan may refer to:

- Tom Dolan (swimmer) (born 1975), American Olympic swimmer
- Tom Dolan (engineer), engineer who worked on the Apollo space program
- Tom Dolan (baseball) (1855–1913), catcher in Major League baseball
- Tom Dolan (sailor), Irish sailor
- Tom Dolan (politician), member of the New Hampshire House of Representatives
- Thomas J. Dolan (1907–1996), American engineer and educator
