= Michel Desjoyeaux =

French sailor

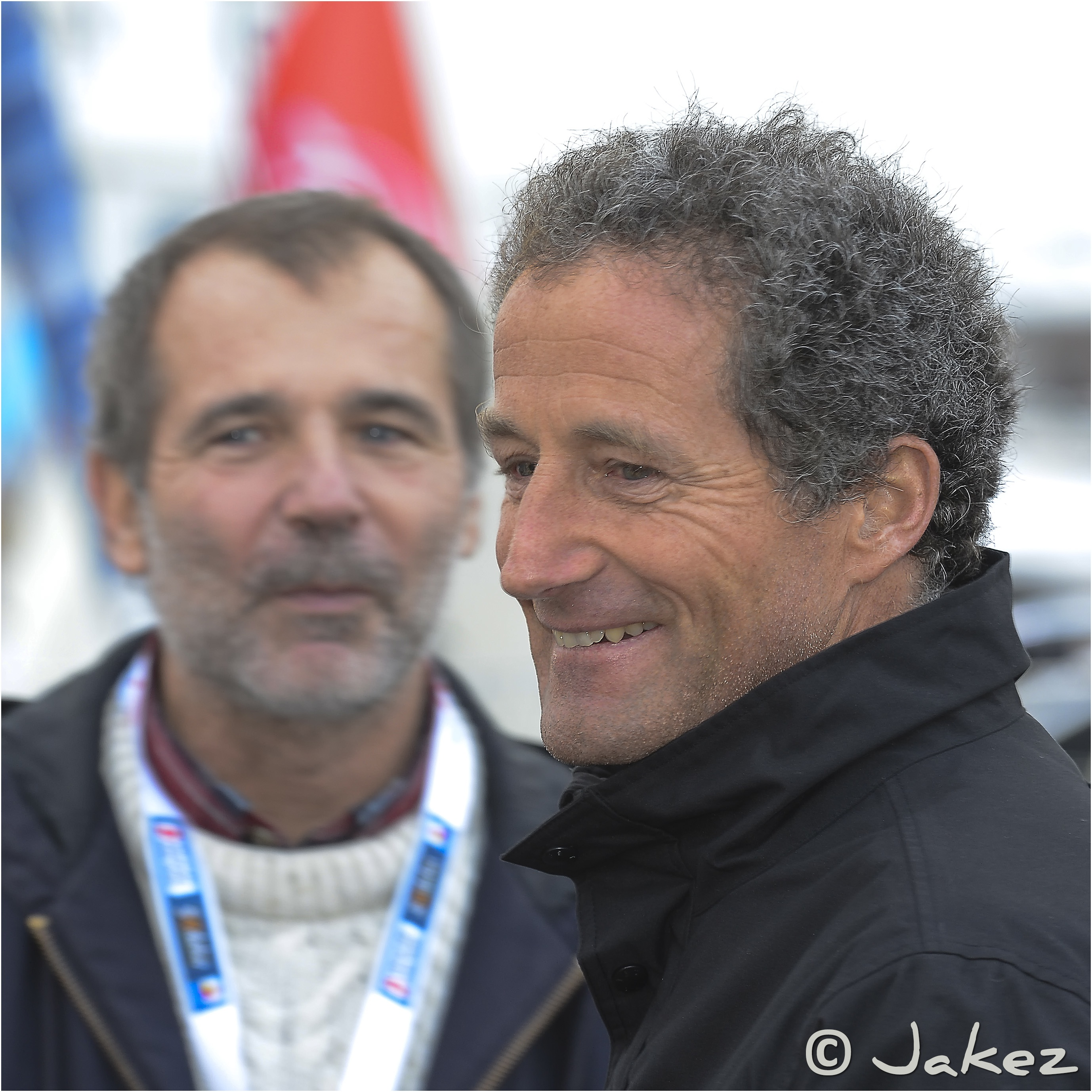
- Michel Desjoyeaux in 2012.

Personal information
- Born: 16 July 1965 (age 60) Concarneau

Sailing career
- Sport: Sailing

Michel Desjoyeaux (born 16 July 1965) is a French sailor, known for competing successfully in several long-distance single-handed races. He won the Vendée Globe race in 2000-01 and 2008–09, making him the only person to win that race more than once. In 2014–15, he was watch captain, on leg 1 on Mapfre in the Volvo Ocean Race. He was born in Concarneau.

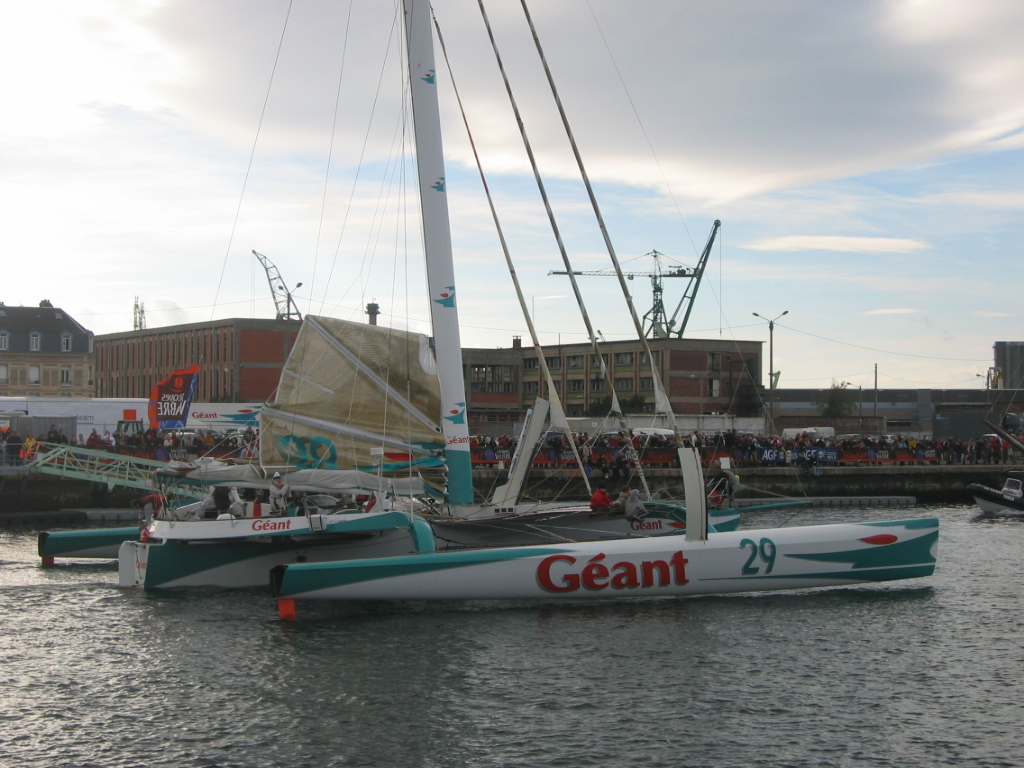
Géant at the start of the Transat Jacques Vabre, Le Havre, 6 November 2005

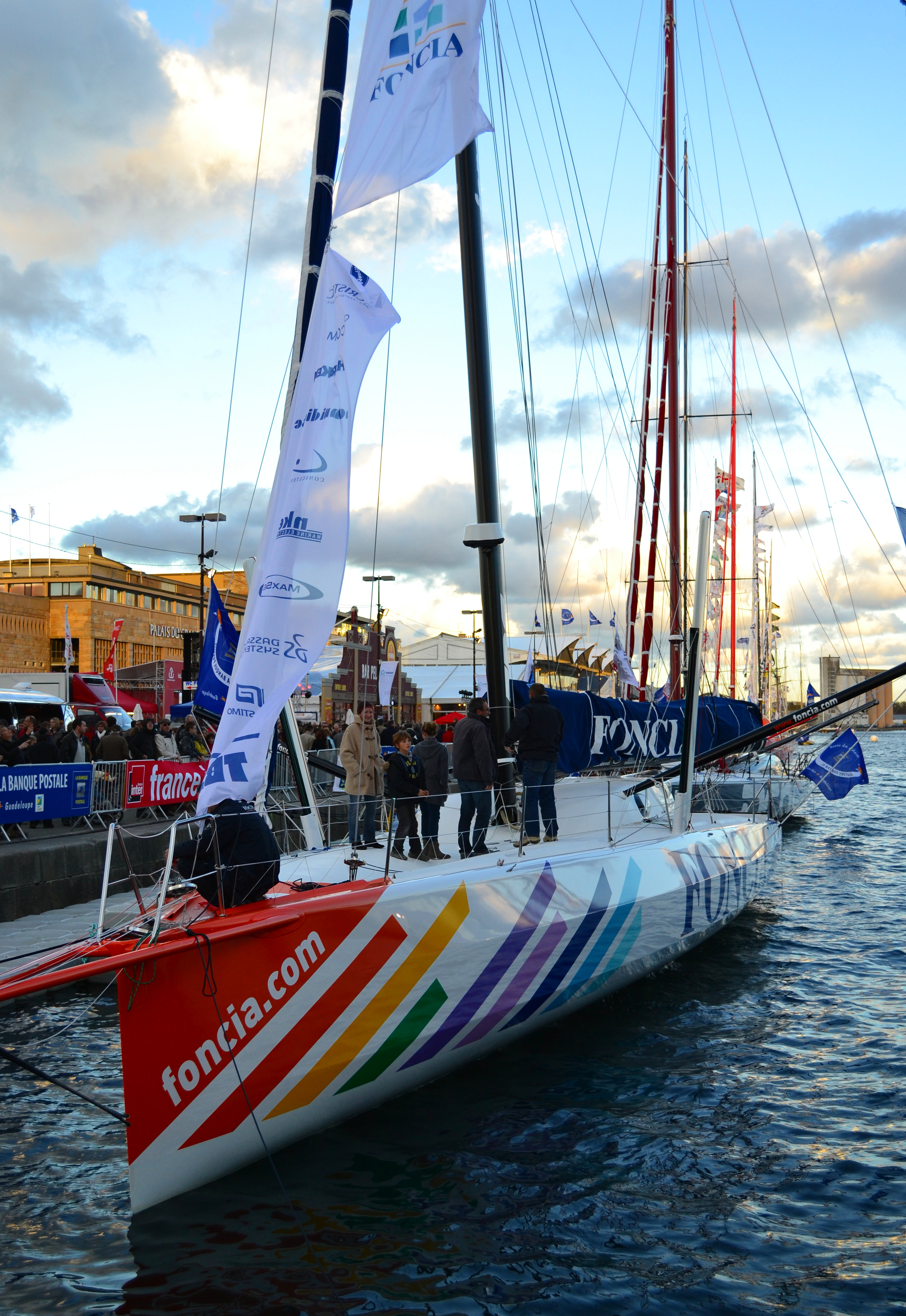
Foncia, IMOCA 60, 24th Oct 2010

== Race Results Highlights ==
Year	Pos	Event	Class	Boat name	Notes	Ref.
Round the World Races
2011	DNF	Barcelona World Race	IMOCA 60		with FRANCOIS GABART due to a broken-field mast	
2008	1	2008-2009 Vendee Globe	IMOCA 60	Foncia	84d 03hrs 9min	
2001	1	2000-2001 Vendee Globe	IMOCA 60	PRB	93d 3hrs 57mins	
Transatlantic Races
2025	19	Transat Jacques Vabre	Class 40	FRA 210 - TRIMCONTROL	with Alexandre Le Gallais (FRA)	
2015	16	Transat Jacques Vabre	IMOCA 60	MACIF	with Paul Meilhat	
2014	10	Transat AG2r	Bénéteau Figaro 2	BRETAGNE CREDIT MUTUEL PERFORMANCE	with Horeau Corentin	
2013	ABN	Transat Jacques Vabre	IMOCA 60	MACIF		
2009	4	Transat Jacques Vabre	IMOCA 60	Foncia (1)	with Jérémie Beyou	
2007	1	Transat Jacques Vabre	IMOCA 60	Foncia (1)	with Emmanuel Le Borgne	
2005	3	Transat Jacques Vabre	ORMA 60	Géant	Hugues Destremau	
2004	1	Single-Handed Trans-Atlantic Race	ORMA 60	Giant		
2001	4	Transat Jacques Vabre	ORMA 60	GEANT	Hervé Jan	
2002	1	Route du Rhum	ORMA 60	Giant		
2001	5	Transat Jacques Vabre	ORMA 60	Belgacom	Jean-Luc Nélias	
1999	ABN	Transat Jacques Vabre	ORMA 60	Brocéliande	with Alain Gautier (Capsized)	
1992	1	Transat AG2r	Bénéteau Figaro	Sill	with Jacques Caraës	
1991	-	Mini Transat Race	Mini Transat 6.50			
Other Events
2019	12	La Solitaire URGO Le Figaro	Bénéteau Figaro 2	Lumibird		
2016		RORC Caribbean 600	Multihull	MOD 70 - Team Concise	Crew	
2015		RORC Caribbean 600	Multihull	MOD 70 - Phoedo3	Crew	
2013	7	La Solitaire du Figaro	Bénéteau Figaro 2	TBS		
2009	5	La Solitaire du Figaro	Bénéteau Figaro 2	Foncia		
2007	1	La Solitaire du Figaro	Bénéteau Figaro 2			
2005	2	La Solitaire du Figaro	Bénéteau Figaro 2			
2003	3	La Solitaire du Figaro	Bénéteau Figaro 2			
1998	1	La Solitaire du Figaro	Bénéteau Figaro			
1997	5	La Solitaire du Figaro	Bénéteau Figaro			
1996	2	La Solitaire du Figaro	Bénéteau Figaro			
1995	12	La Solitaire du Figaro	Bénéteau Figaro			
1992	1	La Solitaire du Figaro	Bénéteau Figaro			
1991	2	La Solitaire du Figaro	Bénéteau Figaro			
1990	4	La Solitaire du Figaro	Bénéteau Figaro			
1980s	-	Tour de France à la Voile	Selection 37			
2009	1	Istanbul Europa Race			with Jérémie Beyou, Marc Liardet, Gildas Mahé and Julien Marcelet)	
2009	1	Bol d'Or Mirabaud			with Alain Gautier	

== See also ==
- Mini Transat 6.50
- Scow
