= Solitaire du Figaro =

Solo multi-stage sailing race

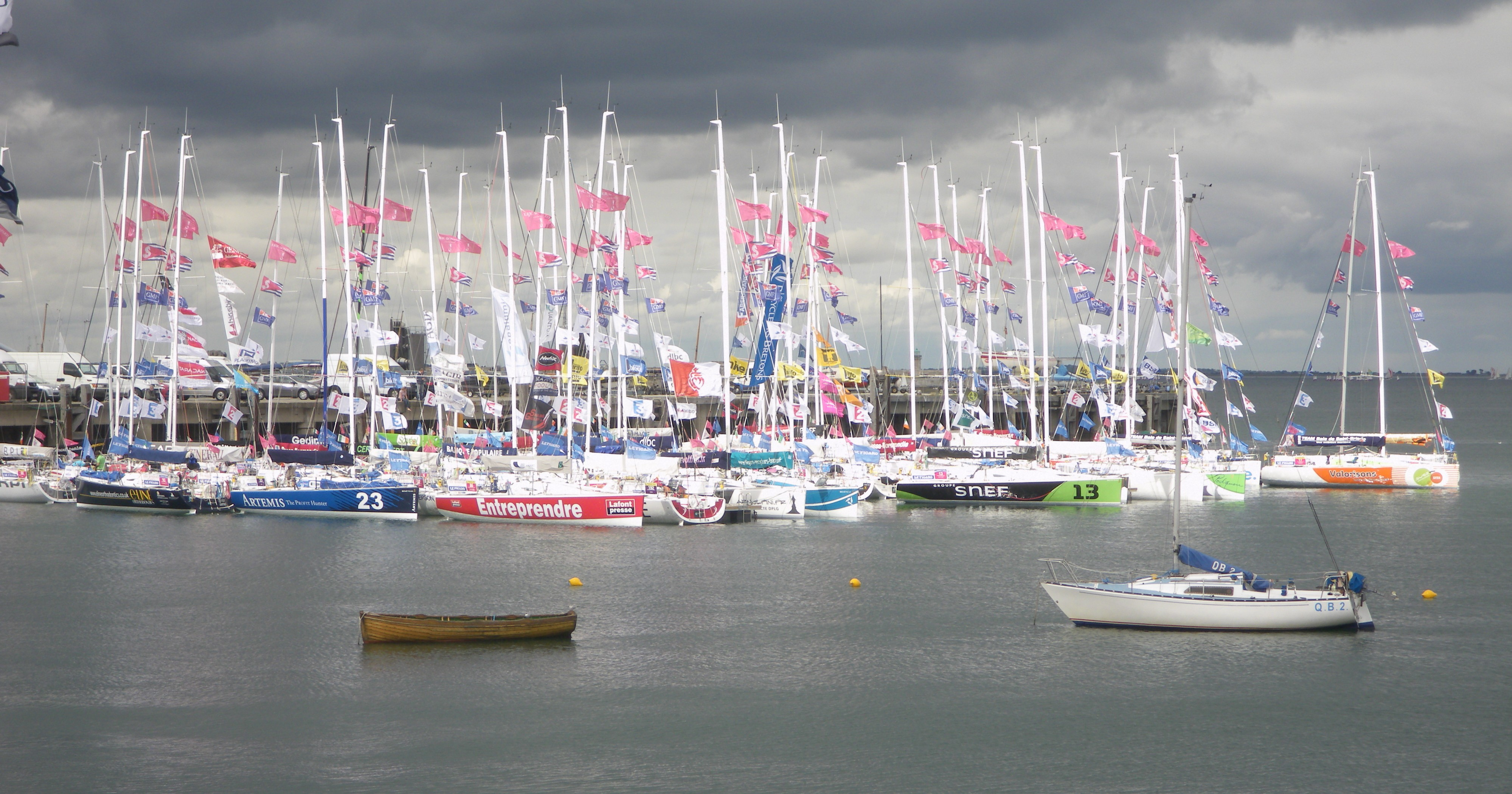
2011 fleet in Dún Laoghaire, Ireland

The Solitaire du Figaro (French: [sɔlitɛʁ dy fiɡaʁo]), until 1979 the Course de l'Aurore ([kuʁs d(ə) loʁɔʁ]), is a yearly single-handed multi-stage sailing race created in 1970 by Jean-Louis Guillemard and Jean-Michel Barrault. The unique character of the race, the presence of great solo sailors and it being open to amateurs, has made it one of the most cherished races in French sailing. The race is always in the Atlantic but its stages vary yearly. In 2025, the race had three stages between France and Spain.

== History ==
From 1970 to 1979 the race was organised by the newspaper L'Aurore. In 1980 the daily newspaper Le Figaro bought out L'Aurore and became the principal sponsor of the event.

From 2003, the eyewear company Alain Afflelou was an associate sponsor. The official name of the race became La Solitaire Afflelou Le Figaro. Since 2008, the motor manufacturer Suzuki replaced them, and the race became named La Solitaire du Figaro Suzuki.

Since 2011 the title sponsor of the race has been Éric Bompard Cachemire, a French fashion house specialising in cashmere garments.

The characteristics of the race are:

- It starts around the end of July from a French port.
- The race is split into 4 stages of varying length from year to year, from the length of the French coast and making up a total of around 1,500 to 2,000 nautical miles (1,700 to 2,300 mi; 2,800 to 3,700 km) on average. Over the years the race has lasted between 10 and 13 days at sea.
- Each competitor is alone in the boat, participation is mixed.
- Since 1990, all boats are of one design.

== Boats ==
In 1991, the Solitaire du Figaro made the milestone of becoming a One-Design race. The race organisers chose the Bénéteau Figaro (later called the Figaro Bénéteau I) designed by Group Finot and Jean Berret. In 2003, a new design called Beneteau Figaro 2 was introduced and it was replaced in 2018, by the hydrofoiling Beneteau Figaro 3.

== Past winners ==
| Year | Winning Skipper | Winning boat Name | No. Starters | Note | Ref. |
|---|---|---|---|---|---|
| 1970 | Joan de Kat (FRA) | | | | |
| 1971 | Michel Malinovsky (FRA) | Rousslane | | Centurion. | |
| 1972 | Jean-Marie Vidal (FRA) | Cap 33 | | Super Arlequin (Mauric). | |
| 1973 | Gilles Le Baud (FRA) | Araok Atao. | | | |
| 1974 | Eugène Riguidel (FRA) | Radial, Bes. | | | |
| 1975 | Guy Cornou (FRA) | Jabadao | | Clipper MC (Mauric). | |
| 1976 | Guy Cornou (FRA) | C Cook | | Mallard 9 m. | |
| 1977 | Gilles Gahinet (FRA) | Rallye | | Ron Holland. | |
| 1978 | Gilles Le Baud (FRA) | Kelt-La Concorde | | Berret. | |
| 1979 | Patrick Eliès (FRA) | Chaussettes Olympia | | Eglantine (JM Finot). | |
| 1980 | Gilles Gahinet (FRA) | Port de Pornic | | Gahinet. | |
| 1981 | Sylvain Rosier (FRA) | Chantier Pichavant | | Joubert Nivelt 81. | |
| 1982 | Philippe Poupon (FRA) | GibSea+4 | | GibSea plus 90. | |
| 1983 | Lionel Péan (FRA) | Hitachi | | Joubert Nivelt 82. | |
| 1984 | Christophe Cudennec (FRA) | Presqu'ile de Crozon | | Andrieu 84. | |
| 1985 | Philippe Poupon (FRA) | Fleury Michon | | Andrieu 85. | |
| 1986 | Christophe Auguin (FRA) | Normerel | | Joubert Nivelt 82. | |
| 1987 | Jean-Marie Vidal (FRA) | | | in Eterna, Joubert Nivelt 82. | |
| 1988 | Laurent Bourgnon (FRA) | Saint-Brévin | | Joubert Nivelt 82. | |
| 1989 | Alain Gautier (FRA) | Concorde | | Andrieu 89. | |
| 1990 | Laurent Cordelle (FRA) | | | | |
| 1991 | Yves Parlier (FRA) | | | | |
| 1992 | Michel Desjoyeaux (FRA) | | | | |
| 1993 | Dominic Vittet]] (FRA) | | | | |
| 1994 | Jean Le Cam (FRA) | | | | |
| 1995 | Philippe Poupon (FRA) | | | | |
| 1996 | Jean Le Cam (FRA) | | | | |
| 1997 | Franck Cammas (FRA) | | | | |
| 1998 | Michel Desjoyeaux (FRA) | | | | |
| 1999 | Jean Le Cam (FRA) | | | | |
| 2000 | Pascal Bidégorry (FRA) | | | | |
| 2001 | Éric Drouglazet (FRA) | | | | |
| 2002 | Kito de Pavant (FRA) | | | | |
| 2003 | Armel Le Cléac'h (FRA) | | | | |
| 2004 | Charles Caudrelier (FRA) | | | | |
| 2005 | Jérémie Beyou (FRA) | | | | |
| 2006 | Nicolas Troussel (FRA) | | | | |
| 2007 | Michel Desjoyeaux (FRA) | | | | |
| 2008 | Nicolas Troussel (FRA) | | | | |
| 2009 | Nicolas Lunven (FRA) | | | | |
| 2010 | Armel Le Cléac'h (FRA) | | | | |
| 2011 | Jérémie Beyou (FRA) | | | | |
| 2012 | Yann Elies (FRA) | | | | |
| 2013 | Yann Elies (FRA) | | | | |
| 2014 | Jérémie Beyou (FRA) | | | | |
| 2015 | Yann Eliès (3) (FRA) | | | | |
| 2016 | Yoann Richomme (FRA) | | | | |
| 2017 | Nicolas Lunven (FRA) | | | | |
| 2018 | Sébastien Simon (FRA) | | | | |
| 2019 | Yoann Richomme (FRA) | | | | |
| 2020 | Armel Le Cléac'h (FRA) | | | | |
| 2021 | Pierre Quiroga (FRA) | | | | |
| 2022 | | | | | |
| 2023 | | | | | |
| 2024 | Tom Dolan (IRL) | Smurfit Kappa – Kingspan | | | |
| 2025 | Alexis Loison (FRA) | Groupe REEL | 34 | | |
| 2026 | Nicolas Lunven (FRA) | PRB | 36 | | |

== Results ==
All places are in France unless otherwise stated.

=== 2003 ===
1st stage: Les Sables-d'Olonne – Getxo/Bilbao (Spain)
2nd stage: Getxo/Bilbao – La Rochelle
3rd stage: La Rochelle – Dingle (Ireland)
4th stage: Dingle – Saint-Nazaire – 1979 nmi

- Overall results:

1. Armel Le Cléac'h (Créaline) in 327h 08min 19s
2. Alain Gautier (Foncia) +13s
3. Michel Desjoyeaux (Géant) +1h 26min 17s

42 skippers started, 42 finished.

=== 2004 ===
1st stage: Caen – Portsmouth (England)
2nd stage: Portsmouth – Saint-Gilles-Croix-de-Vie
3rd stage: Saint-Gilles-Croix-de-Vie – Gijón (Spain)
4th stage: Gijon – Quiberon – 1373 nmi

51 competitors.

- Overall results:

1. Charles Caudrelier (Bostik Findley) in 220h 53min 54s
2. Yann Éliès (Groupe Generali Assurances) +52min 35s
3. Jérémie Beyou (Delta Dore) +1h 24min 35s

52 skippers started, 52 finished.

=== 2005 ===
1st stage: Perros-Guirec – Getxo-Bilbao (Spain) – 390 nmi
2nd stage: Getxo-Bilbao – La Rochelle – 368 nmi
3rd stage: La Rochelle – Cork (Ireland) – 456 nmi
4th stage: Cork – Talmont-Saint-Hilaire – 496 nmi

- Overall results:

1. Jérémie Beyou (France) (Delta Dore) in 248h 49min 20s
2. Michel Desjoyeaux (France) (Géant) +1h 20min 54s
3. Kito de Pavant (France) (Groupe Bel) +1h 58min 41s
4. Gildas Morvan (France) (Cercle Vert) +2h 17min 9s
5. (France) (Groupe Generali Assurances) +2h 24min 22s
6. Laurent Pellecuer (France) (Cliptol Sport) +2h 29min 45s
7. Frédéric Duthil (France) (Brossard) +2h 35min 53s
8. Pietro d'Ali (Italy) (Nanni Diesel) +3h 5min 12s, first newcomer
9. Erwan Tabarly (France) (Thales) +3h 13min 3s
10. Charles Caudrelier (France) (Bostik) +3h 18min 57s

46 skippers started, 42 finished.

=== 2006 ===
1st stage: Cherbourg-Octeville – Santander (Spain) – 590 nmi
2nd stage: Santander – Saint-Gilles-Croix-de-Vie – 314 nmi
3rd stage: Saint-Gilles-Croix-de-Vie – Dingle (Ireland) – 549 nmi
4th stage: Dingle – Concarneau – 449 nmi

Started 6 August 2006, with 44 competitors.

- Overall results:

1. Nicolas Troussel (France) (Financo) in 297h 01min 56s
2. Thierry Chabagny (France) (Littoral) +1h 56min 55s
3. Gérald Véniard (France) (Scutum) +3h 55min 28s
4. Armel Le Cléac'h (France) (Brit Air) +5h 20min 20s
5. Yann Éliès (France) (Groupe Generali assurances) +6h 33min 07s
6. Charles Caudrelier (France) (Bostik) +6h 57min 50s
7. Erwan Tabarly (France) (Iceberg Finance) +6h 58min 36s
8. Oliver Krauss (France) (AXA Plaisance) +7h 21min 53s
9. Eric Drouglazet (France) (Pixmania.com) +7h 49min 08s
10. Kito de Pavant (France) (Groupe Bel) +7h 58min 03s

=== 2007 ===
Started 29 July 2007, with 50 competitors.

1st stage: Caen – Crosshaven (Ireland) – 425 nmi
2nd stage: Crosshaven- Brest – 344 nmi
3rd stage: Brest – A Coruña (Spain) – (shortened to 542 nmi)
4th stage: A Coruña – Les Sables-d'Olonne – 355 nmi

After ten competitions, Michel Desjoyeaux was the third French sailor to win his third Figaro race, this one being marked by strong winds (as much as 50 knots (58 mph; 93 km/h) in the last two stages which crossed the Gulf of Gascogne.

- Overall results:

1. Michel Desjoyeaux (France) (Foncia) in 247h 20min 47sec
2. Frédéric Duthil (France) (Distinxion) +26 min 38s
3. Corentin Douguet (France) (Leclerc/Bouygues Telecom) +1h 03min 50s
4. Nicolas Troussel (France) (Financo) +1h 41min 26s
5. Gildas Mahé (France) (Le Comptoir Immobilier) +2h 14min 23s
6. Eric Drouglazet (France) (Luisina) +2h 39min 05s
7. Gérald Veniard (France) (Scutum) +3h 16min 53s
8. Gildas Morvan (France) (Cercle Vert) +3h 19min 48s
9. Thomas Rouxel (France) (Défi Mousquetaires) +3h 29min 34s
10. Marc Lepesqueux (France) (Rapid’Flore Caen-La-Mer) +4h 01min 11s

Nicolas Lunven in Bostik finished first newcomer in 14th place.

=== 2008 ===
Started 25 July 2008, with 50 competitors.

1st stage: La Rochelle – Vigo (Spain) – shortened to 320 nmi
2nd stage: Vigo – Cherbourg-Octeville – 575 nmi
3rd stage: Cherbourg-Octeville – l'Aber Wrac'h – (shortened to 471 nmi)

- Overall results:

1. Nicolas Troussel (France) (Financo) in 226h 32min 51sec
2. Gildas Morvan (France) (Cercle Vert) +2h 22min 15sec
3. Frédéric Duthil (France) (Distinxion) +3h 34min 38s
4. Erwan Tabarly (France) (Athema) +3h 53min 57sec
5. Jeanne Grégoire (France) (Banque Populaire) +4h 54min 50sec
6. Christopher Pratt (France) (DCNS 97) 4h 55min 37s
7. Nicolas Bérenger (France) (KONE Ascenceurs) +5h 03min 54s
8. Gildas Mahé (France) (Le Comptoir Immobilier) +5h 52min 27s
9. Laurent Pellecuer (France) (Docteur Valnet aromathérapie) +5h 52min 46s
10. Thierry Chabagny (France) (SUZUKI Automobiles) +6h 23min 08s

François Gabart in Espoir Région Bretagne finished first newcomer in 16th place.

Nicolas Troussel won a race marked by a windless first stage in which he "tué la course" ("killed the race", leading to the neologism "Do a Troussel", in French: faire une Troussel) by arriving six hours ahead. It was his second victory in the race.

=== 2009 ===
Started 30 July 2009 for the 40th race, with 52 competitors.

1st stage: Lorient – A Coruña (Spain) – 345 nmi
2nd stage: A Coruña – Saint-Gilles-Croix-de-Vie 365 nmi
3rd stage: Saint-Gilles-Croix-de-Vie- Dingle (Ireland) – 485 nmi
4th stage: Dingle- Dieppe – 511 nmi

- Overall results:

1. Nicolas Lunven (CGPI) in 285h 56min 55s
2. Yann Éliès (Generali) +20min 29s
3. Frédéric Duthil (Bbox Bouygues Télécom) +26min 14s

=== 2017 ===
Starting on 4 June 2017 from Pauillac, France the 48th edition of the race commenced with 43 competitors:

36 French, 3 British, 1 Swiss, 1 Turkish, 1 Czech and 1 American – a split of 37 men and 6 women skippers took on the challenge.

- 1st stage: Pauillac – Gijon (Spain) – 525 nmi
- 2nd stage: Gijon – Concarneau – 520 nmi
- 3rd stage: Concarneau – Concarneau – 120 nmi
- 4th stage: Concarneau – Dieppe – 505 nmi
- Overall results:
1. Nicolas Lunven (Generali) in 247h 8min 52s
2. Adrien Hardy (Agir Recouvrement) +34min 32s
3. Charlie Dalin (Skipper Macif 2015) +22min 29s
- Rookie prize – Julien Pulve (Team Vendee Formation) in 249h 44min 45s
- Amateur prize – Hugh Brayshaw (The Offshore Academy) in 253h 57min 28s
