= Yann Eliès =

French offshore sailor and navigator

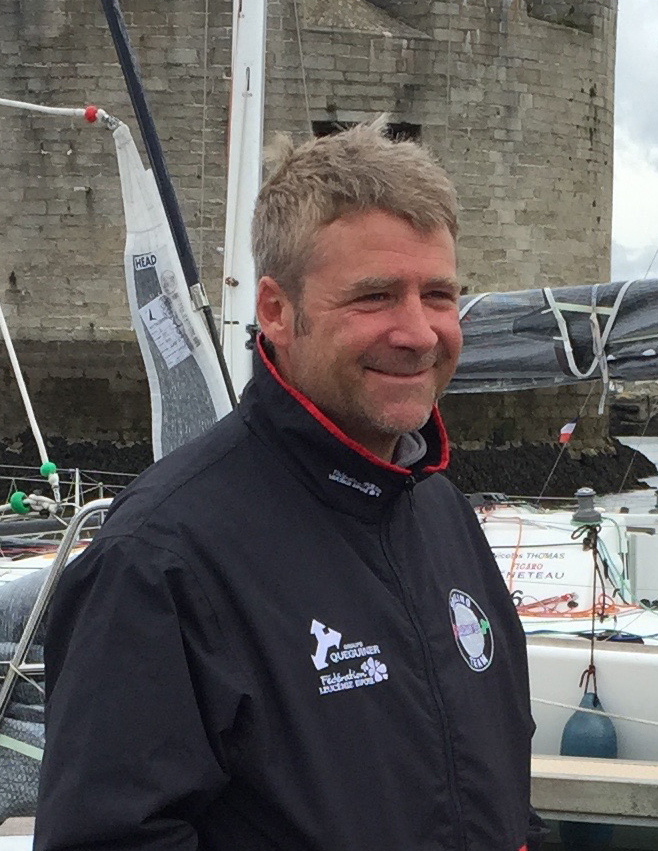

Personal information
- Nationality: French
- Born: 31 January 1974 (age 52) Saint-Brieuc, Côtes-du-Nord

Sailing career
- Sport: Sailing
- Club: C M V ST BRIEUC
- Class: IMOCA 60

Yann Eliès (born 31 January 1974 in Saint-Brieuc, Côtes-du-Nord) is a French professional sailor. He competed in the 2008-2009 Vendée Globe where he was evacuated from his yacht south of Australia after being incapacitated due to a fractured femur. He returned for the 2016-2017 Vendée Globe, finishing 5th.

== Sailing career highlights ==
Pos	Year	Race	Class	Boat name	Notes	Ref
Round the World Races
5	2017	2016-2017 Vendée Globe	IMOCA 60	Groupe Quéguiner - Leukemia Espoir	80 days 03hrs 11m	
RET	2008	2008-2009 Vendée Globe	IMOCA 60		Evacuated from boat with a fractured femur	
WR	2005	Outright Round the World Sailing Record for the Jules Verne Trophy	Maxi Catamaran	Orange II	crew for Bruno Peyron in 50 days 16hrs 20m	
WR	2002	Outright Round the World Sailing Record for the Jules Verne Trophy	Maxi Catamaran	Orange	crew for Bruno Peyron in 64 days 08hrs 37m	
Trans Ocean Races
1	2019	Transat Jacques Vabre	IMOCA 60	Apivia	with Charlie Dalin in 13 days 12 hours and 08 minutes	
1	2017	Transat Jacques-Vabre	IMOCA 60	St Michel - Virbac	with Jean-Pierre Dick	
3	2015	Transat Jacques-Vabre	IMOCA 60	Groupe Quéguiner - Leukemia Espoir	with Charlie Dalin	
2	2018	Route du Rhum	IMOCA	Ucar - Saint Michel	in 12 days, 13 hours, 38 minutes and 30 seconds	
7	2014	Route du Rhum	ultimate class	Paprec Recycling	Boat is a MOD70	
1	2013	Transat Jacques-Vabre	Multi50	FenetreA - Cardinal	with Erwan Le Roux	
RET	2013	Transat Bretagne-Martinique		Groupe Quéguiner - Leukemia Hope		
19	2010	Transat AG2R		Generali - Europ Assistance	with Jérémie Beyou	
4	2007	Transat B to B				
9	2007	Transat Jacques-Vabre			with Sébastien Audigane	
7	2000	Transat AG2R	GROUPE GENERALI ASSURANCES		with Ronan Guerin	
Other Races
6	2017	48th Solitaire Urgo le Figaro	Beneteau Figaro 2	Groupe Queguiner		
2	2015	2015 Rolex Fastnet Race	IMOCA 60	Groupe Quéguiner - Leukemia Espoir	with Charlie Dalin	
1	2015	Solitaire du Figaro	Beneteau Figaro 2	Groupe Quéguiner - Leukemia Espoir		
1	2013	Solitaire du Figaro	Beneteau Figaro 2	Groupe Quéguiner - Leukemia Espoir	(winner of the 1st stage)	
1	2012	Solitaire du Figaro	Beneteau Figaro 2	Groupe Quéguiner - Journal des Entreprises	(winner of the 1st and 3rd stages)	
2	2009	Solitaire du Figaro				
5	2007	Calais Round Britain Race				
8	2007	2007 Rolex Fastnet Race				
13	2003	Solitaire du Figaro	Beneteau Figaro 2		Winner of the 1st stage	

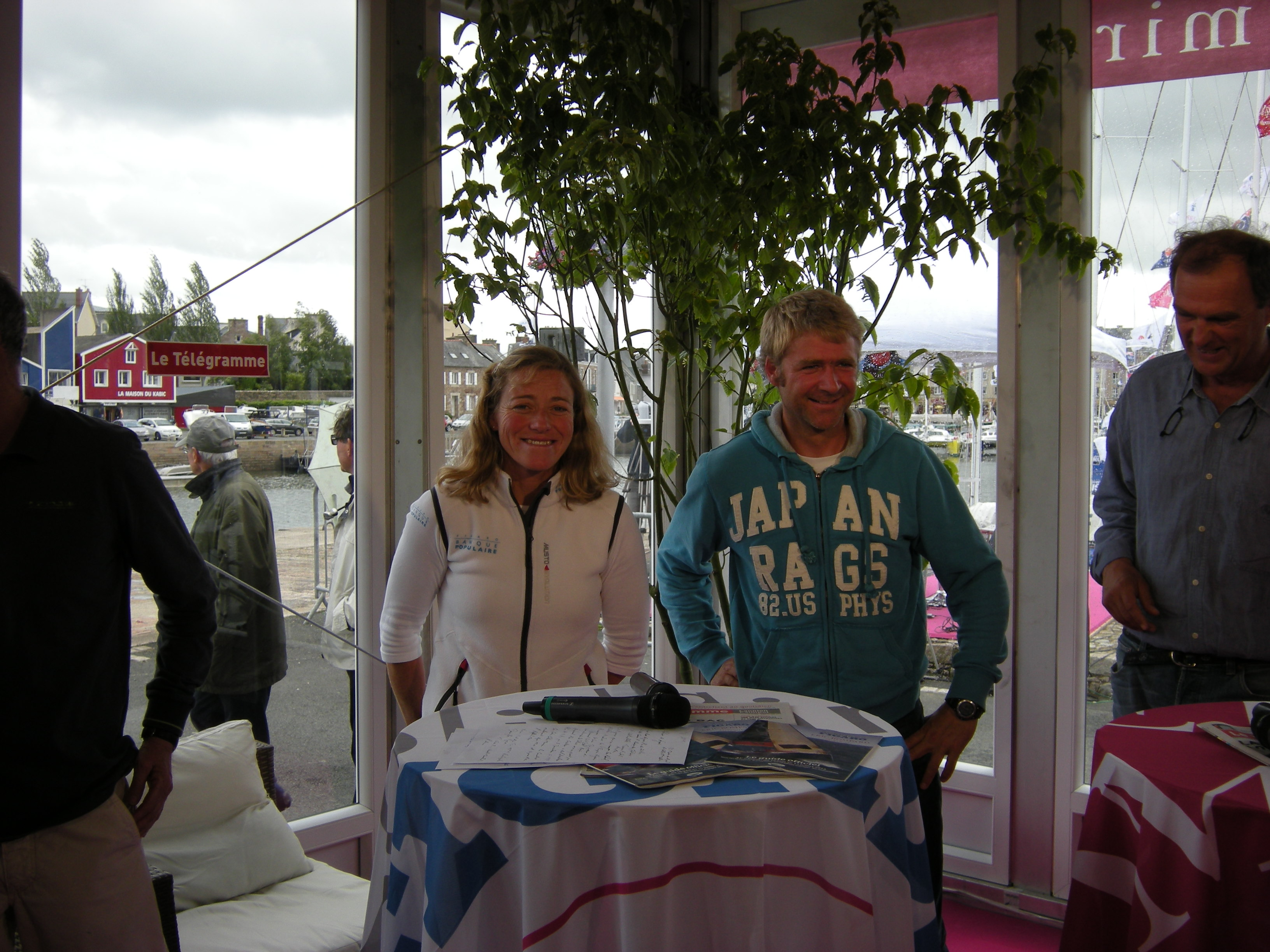

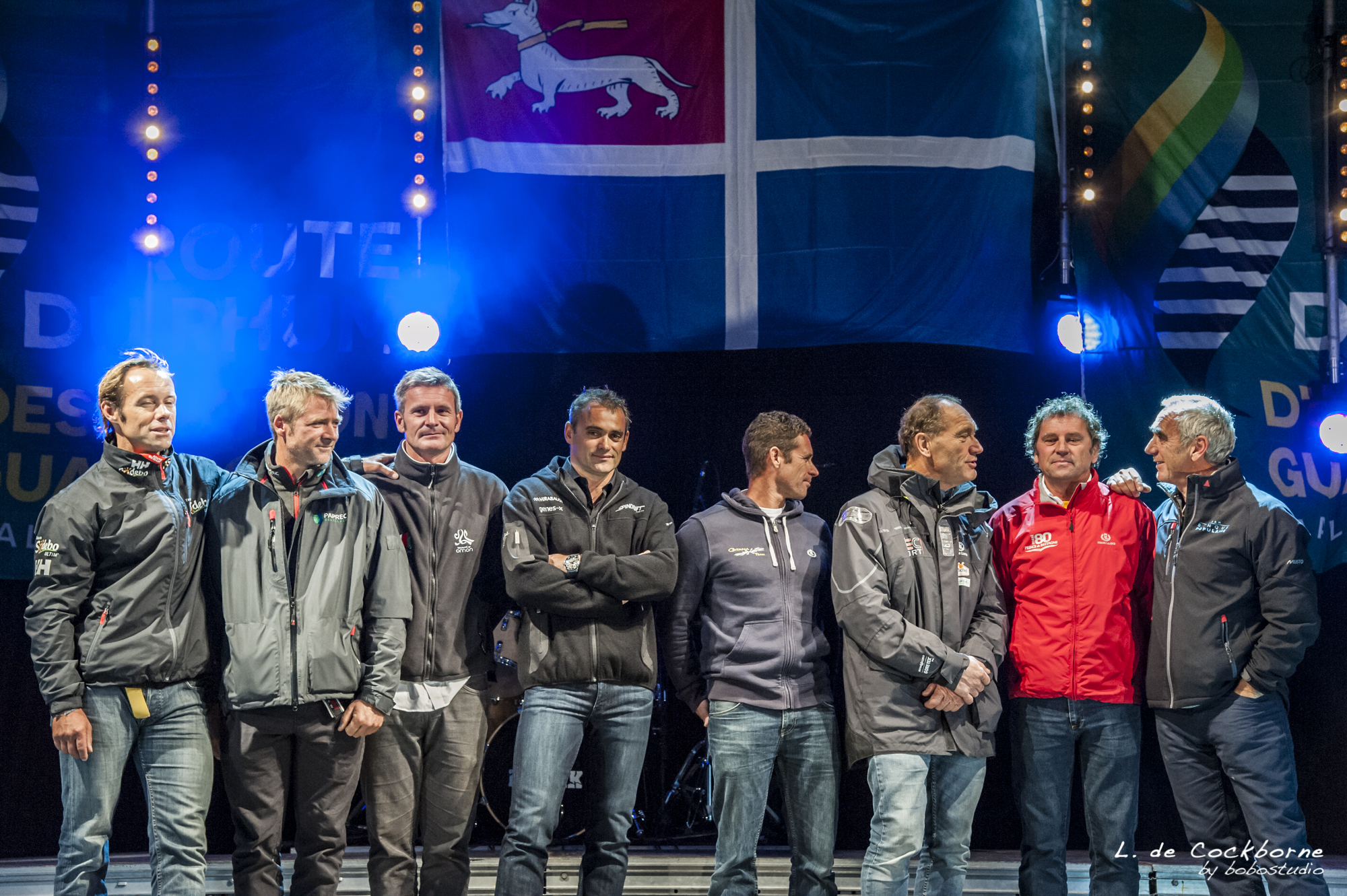

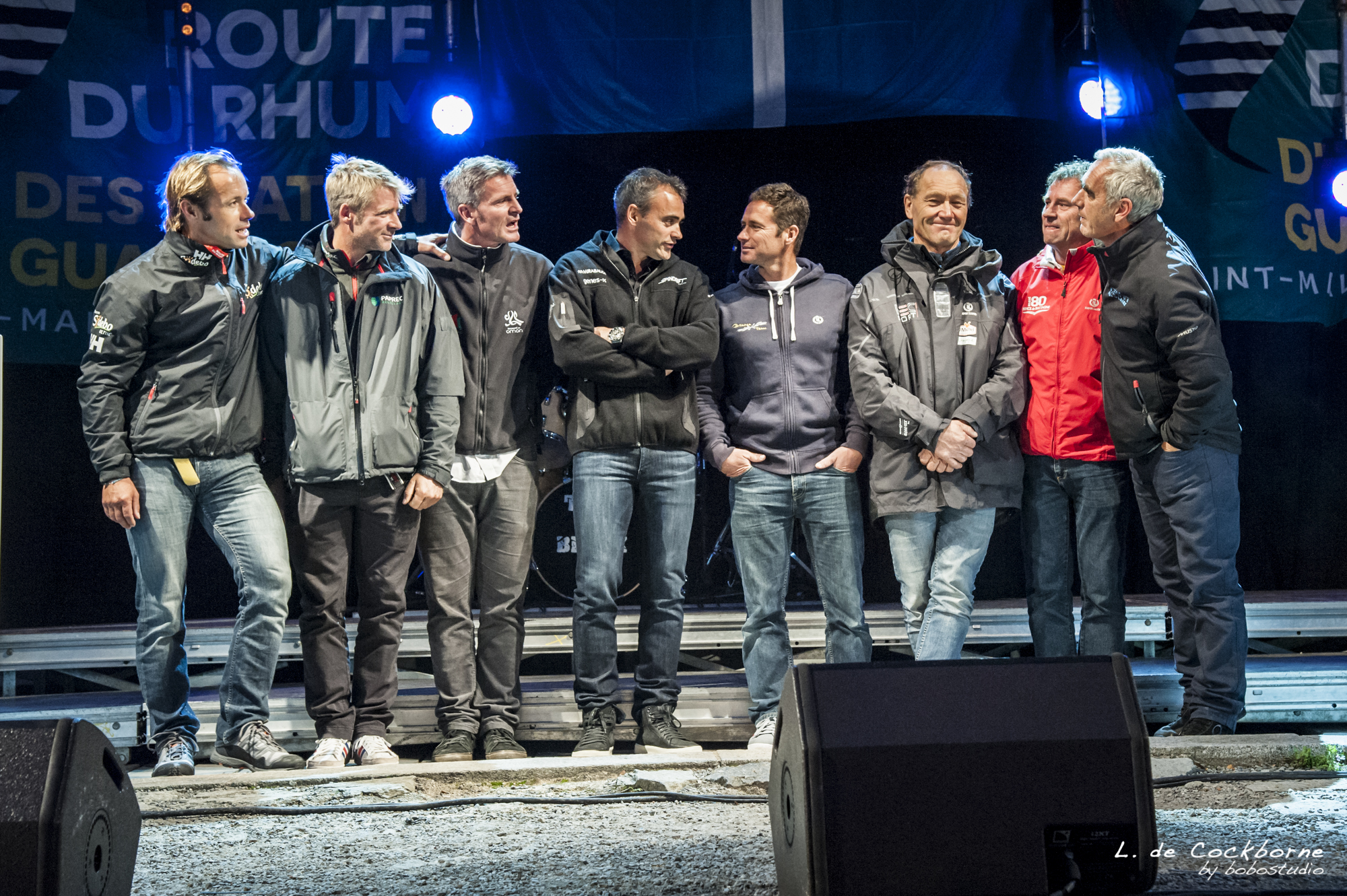

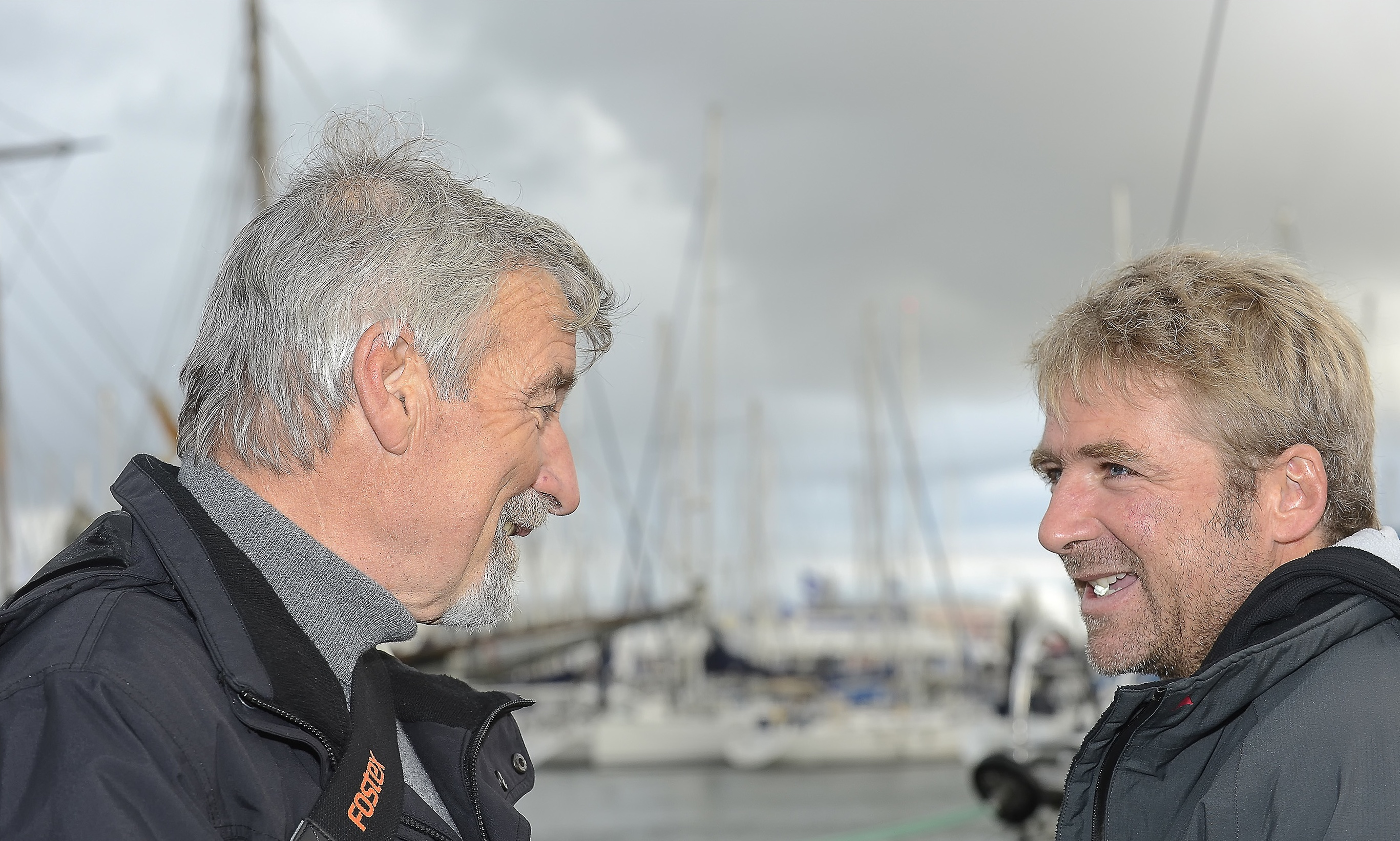

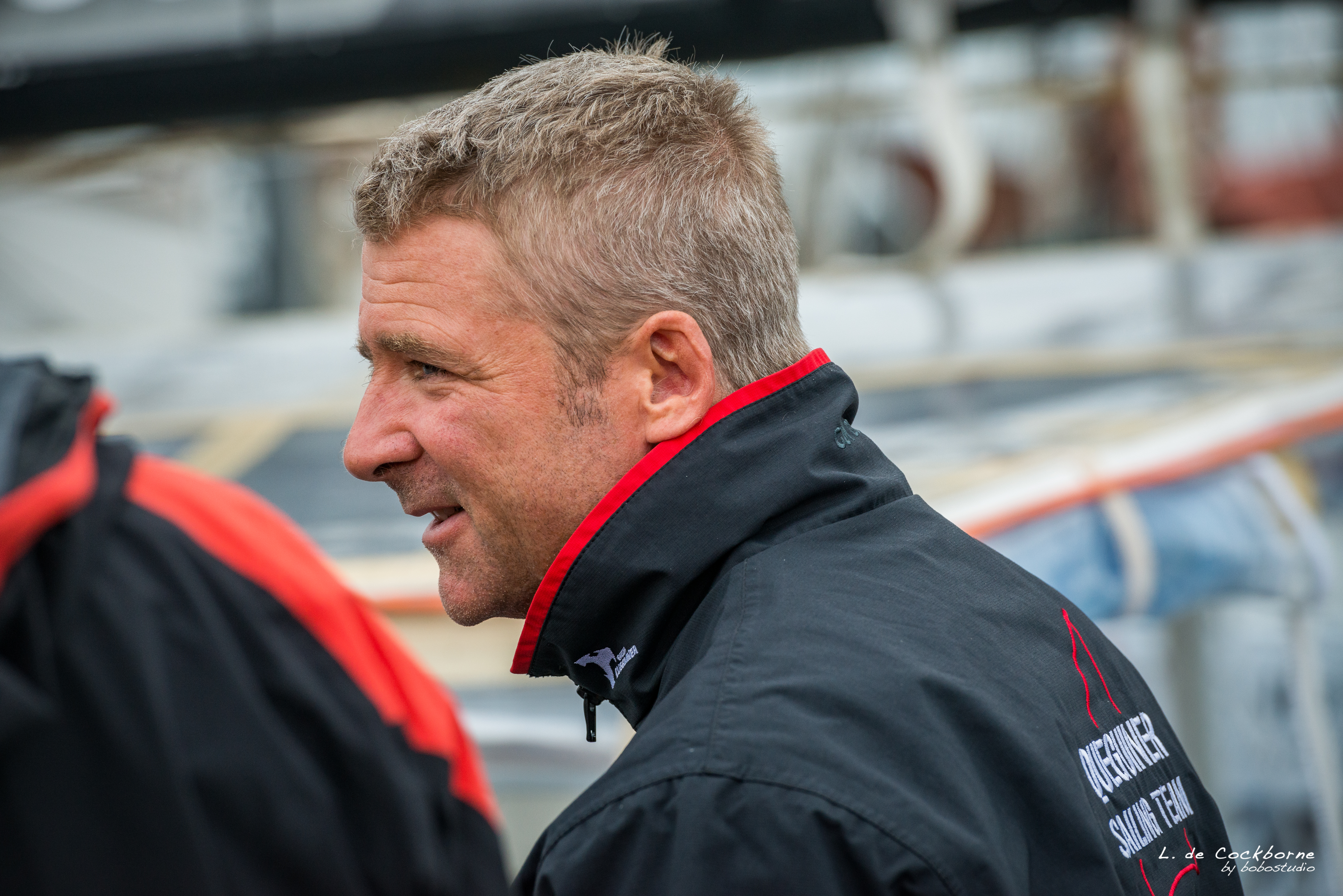

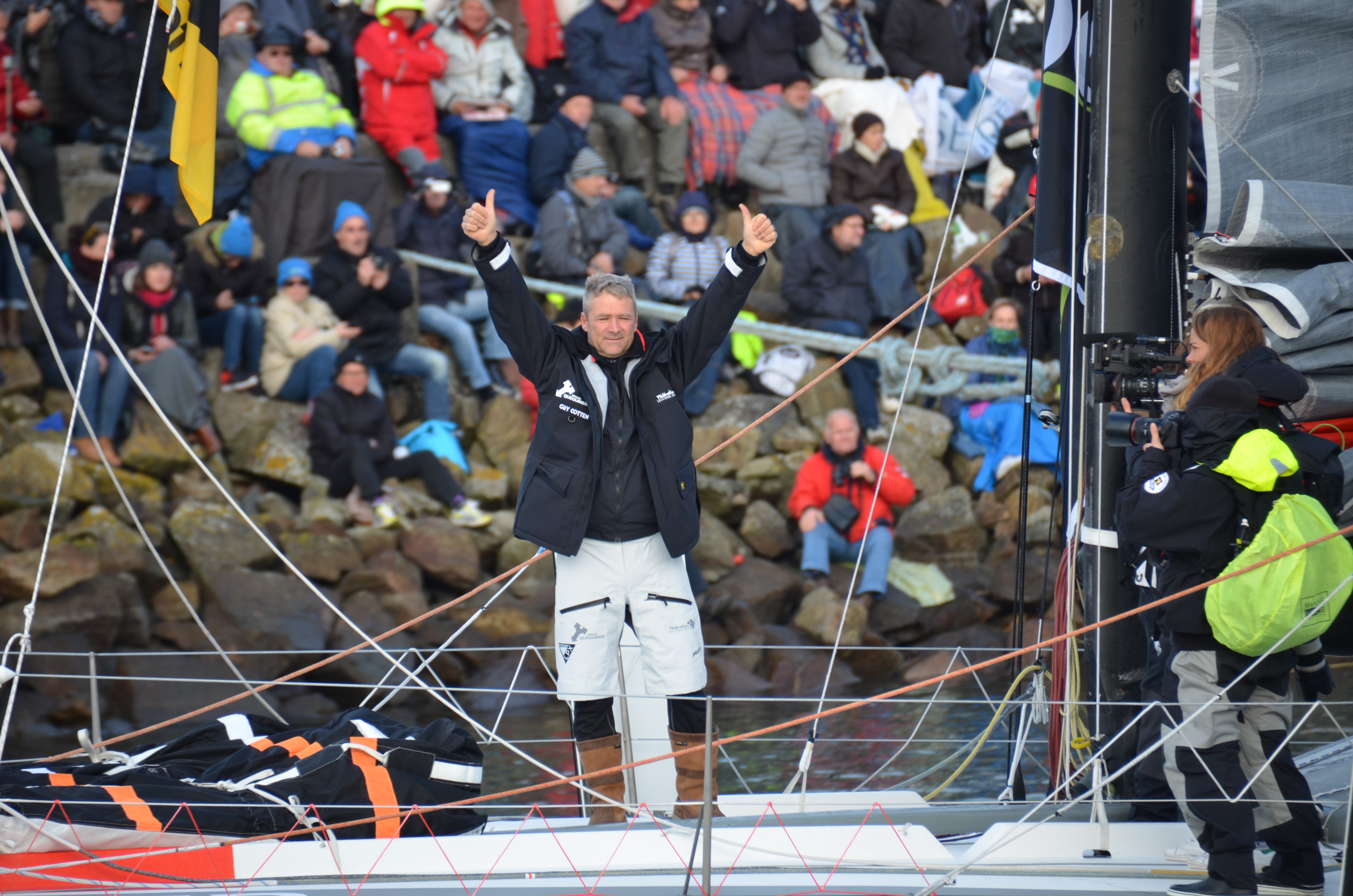

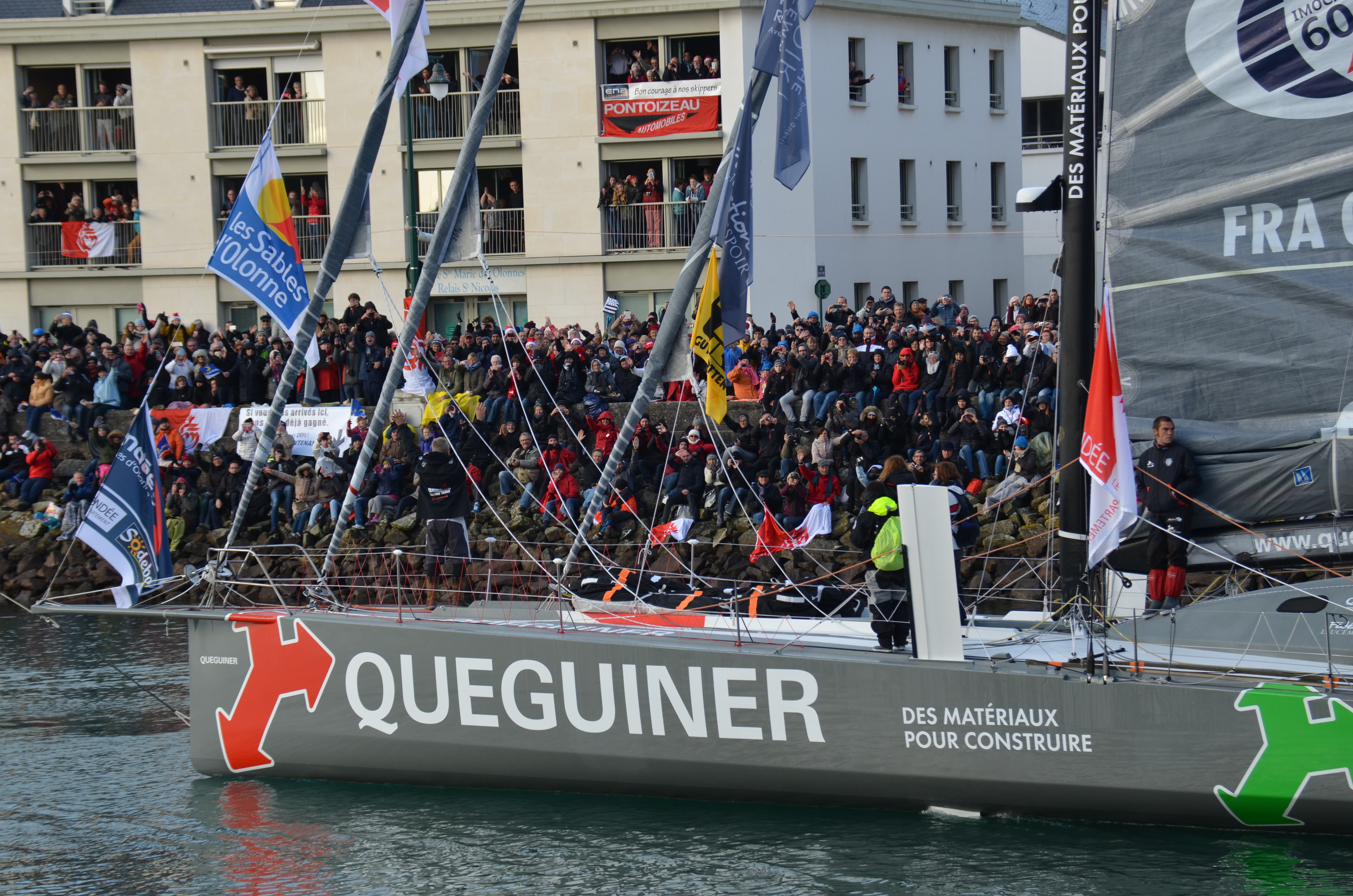

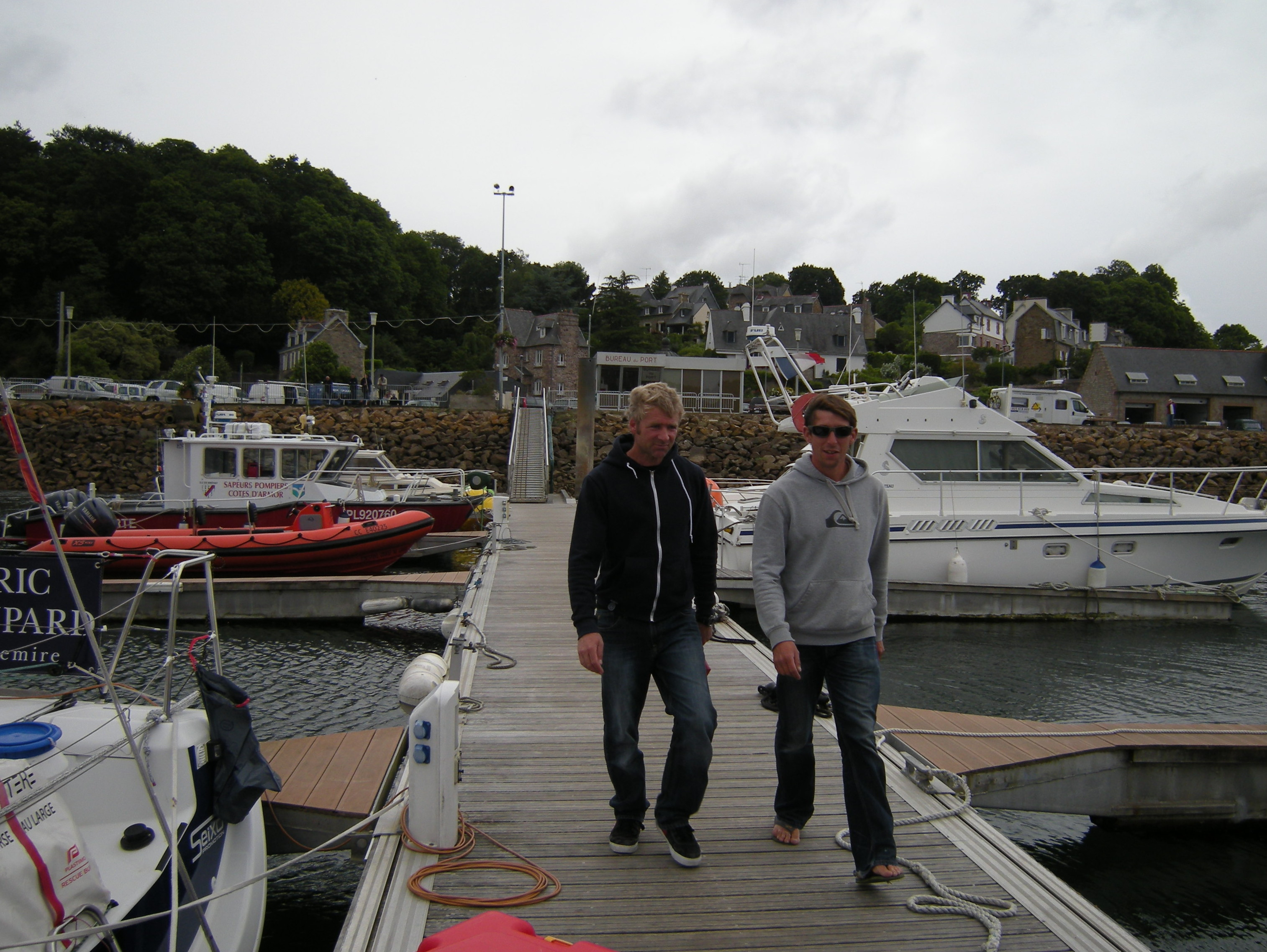

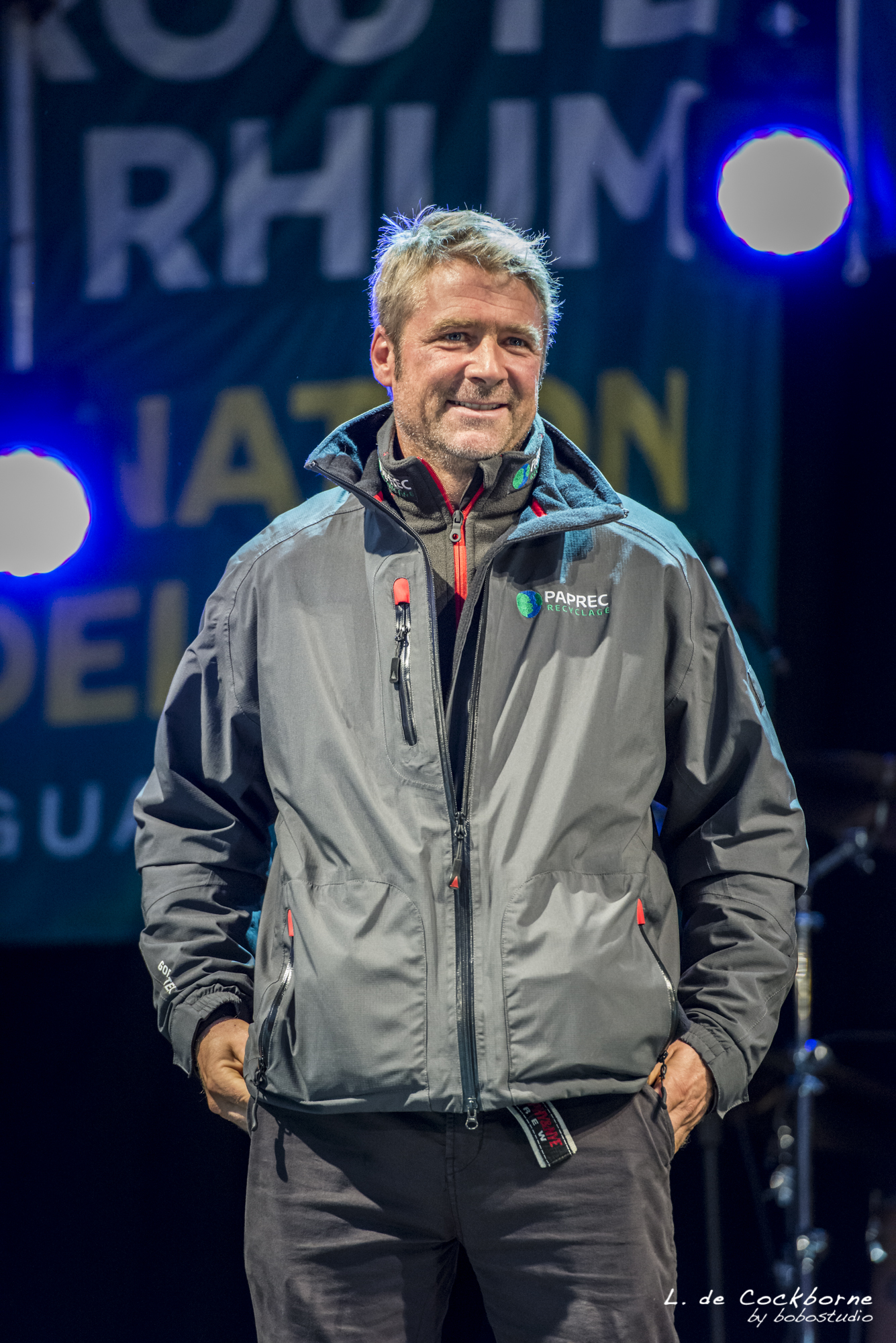

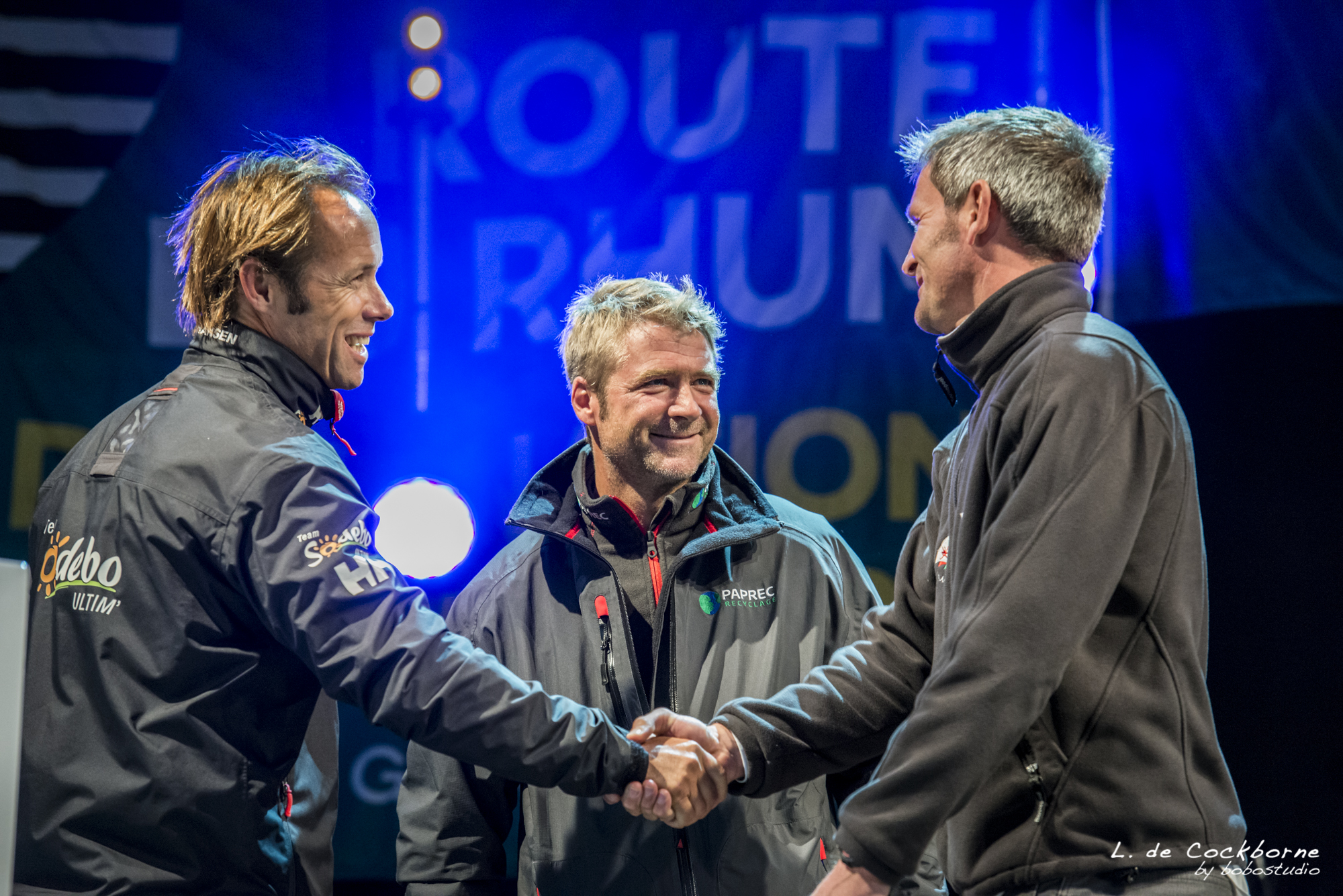

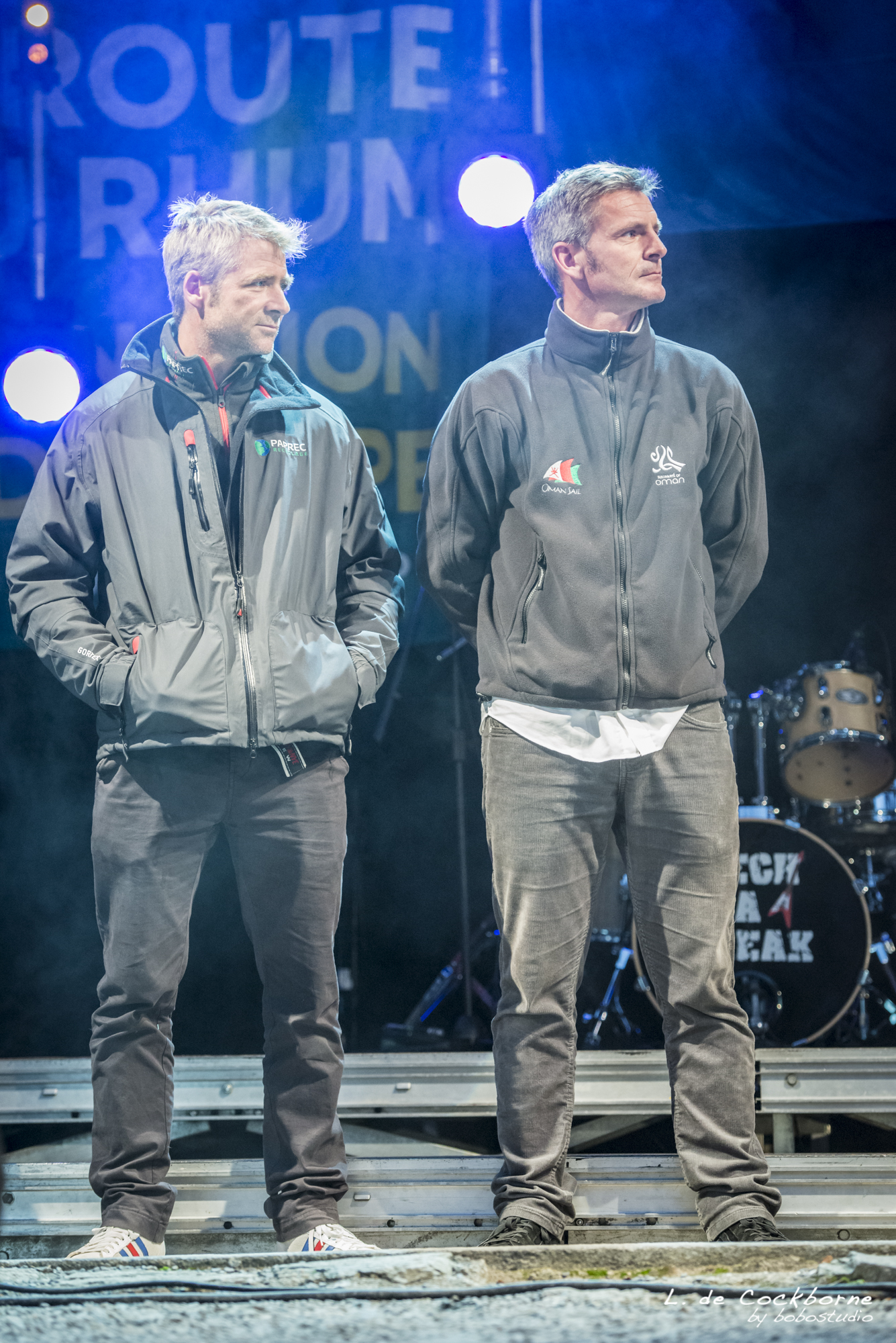

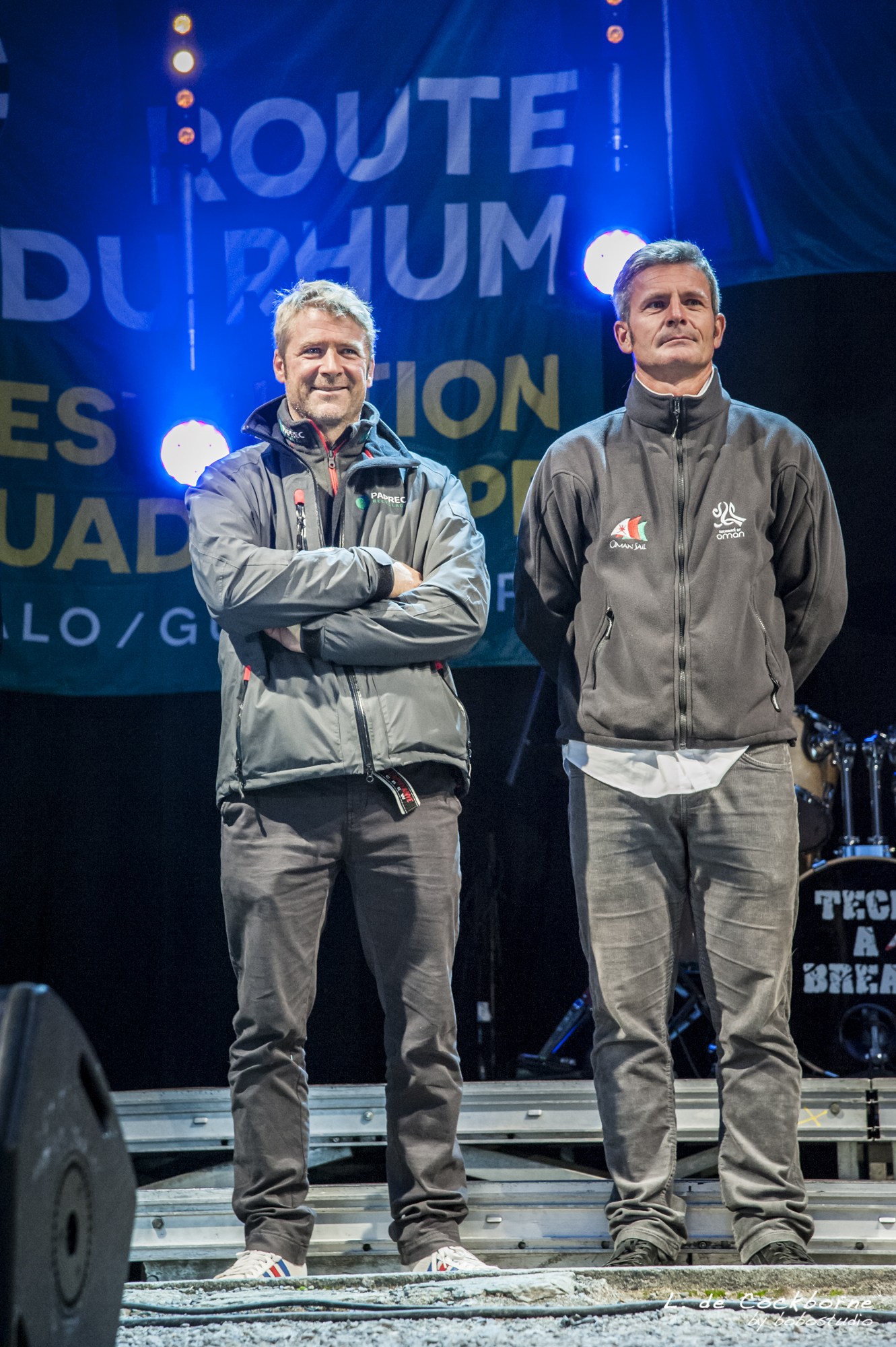

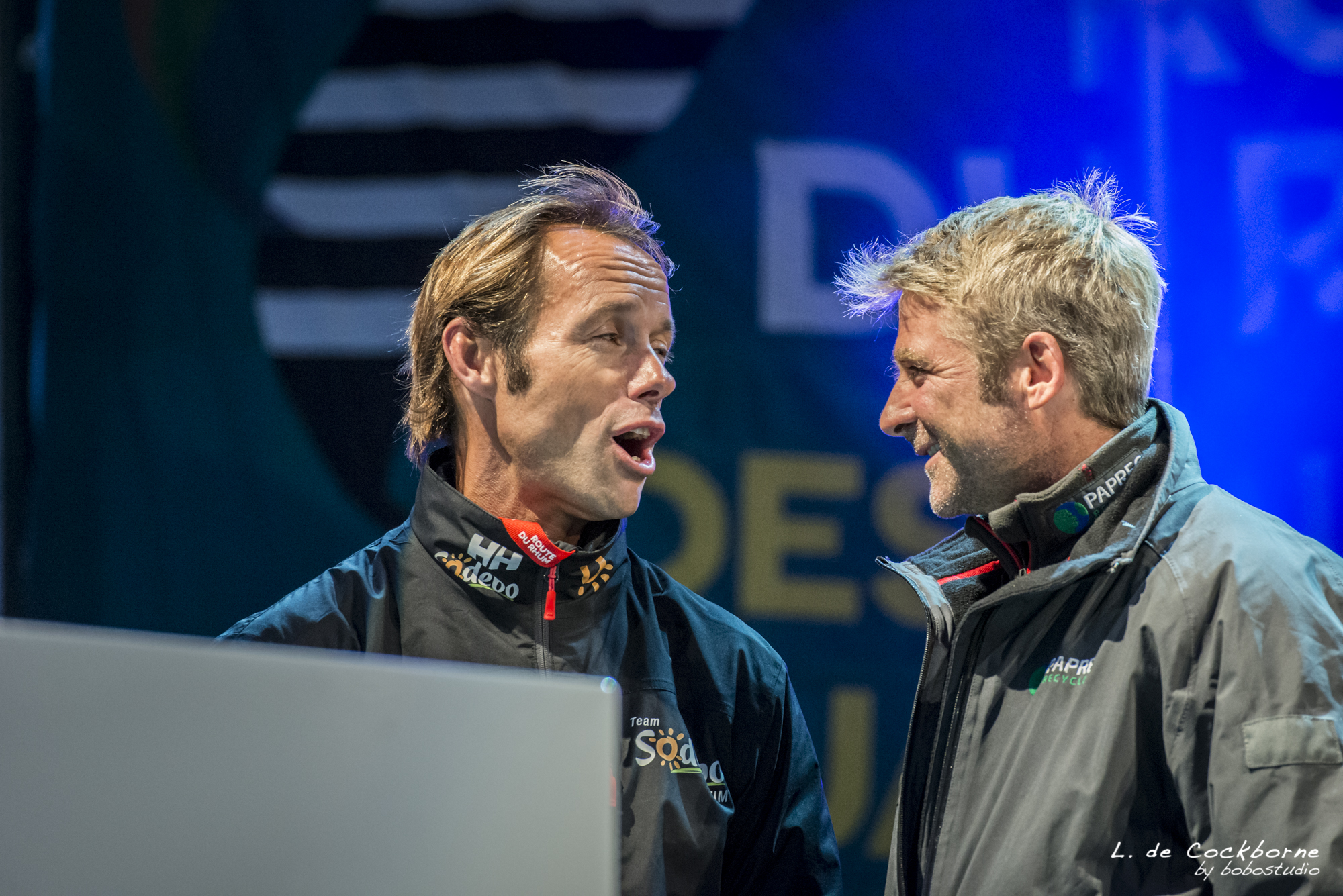

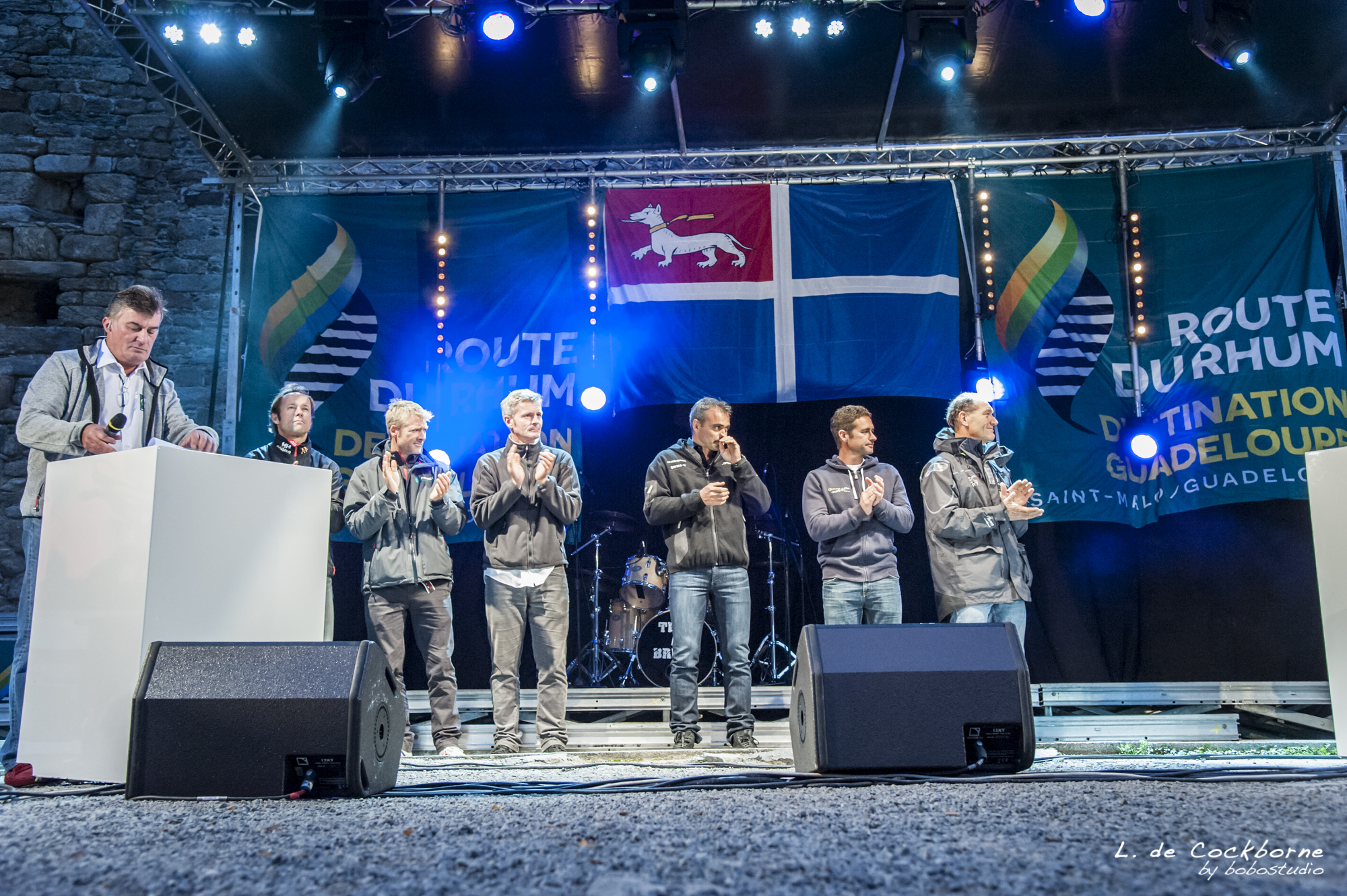

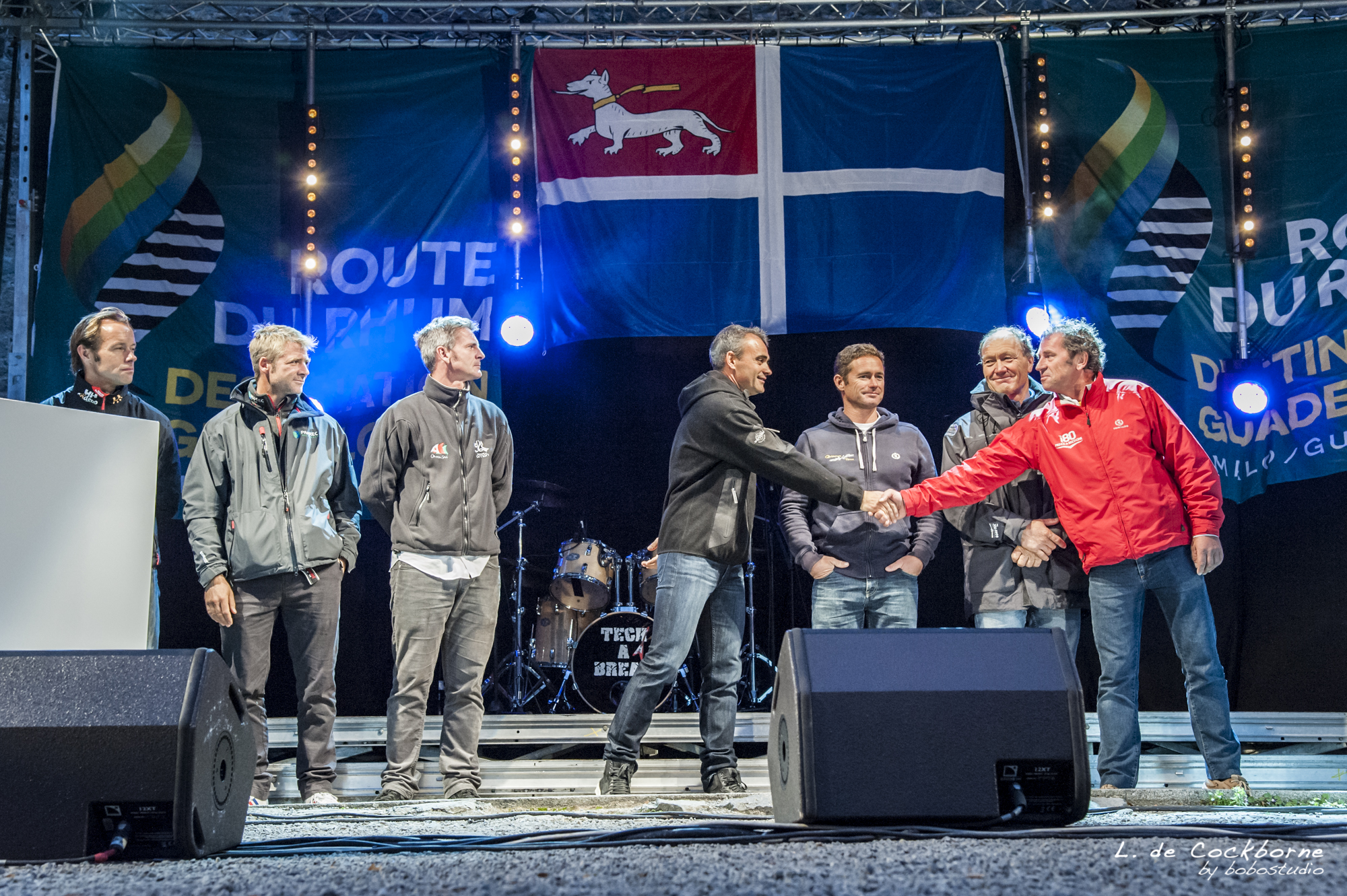

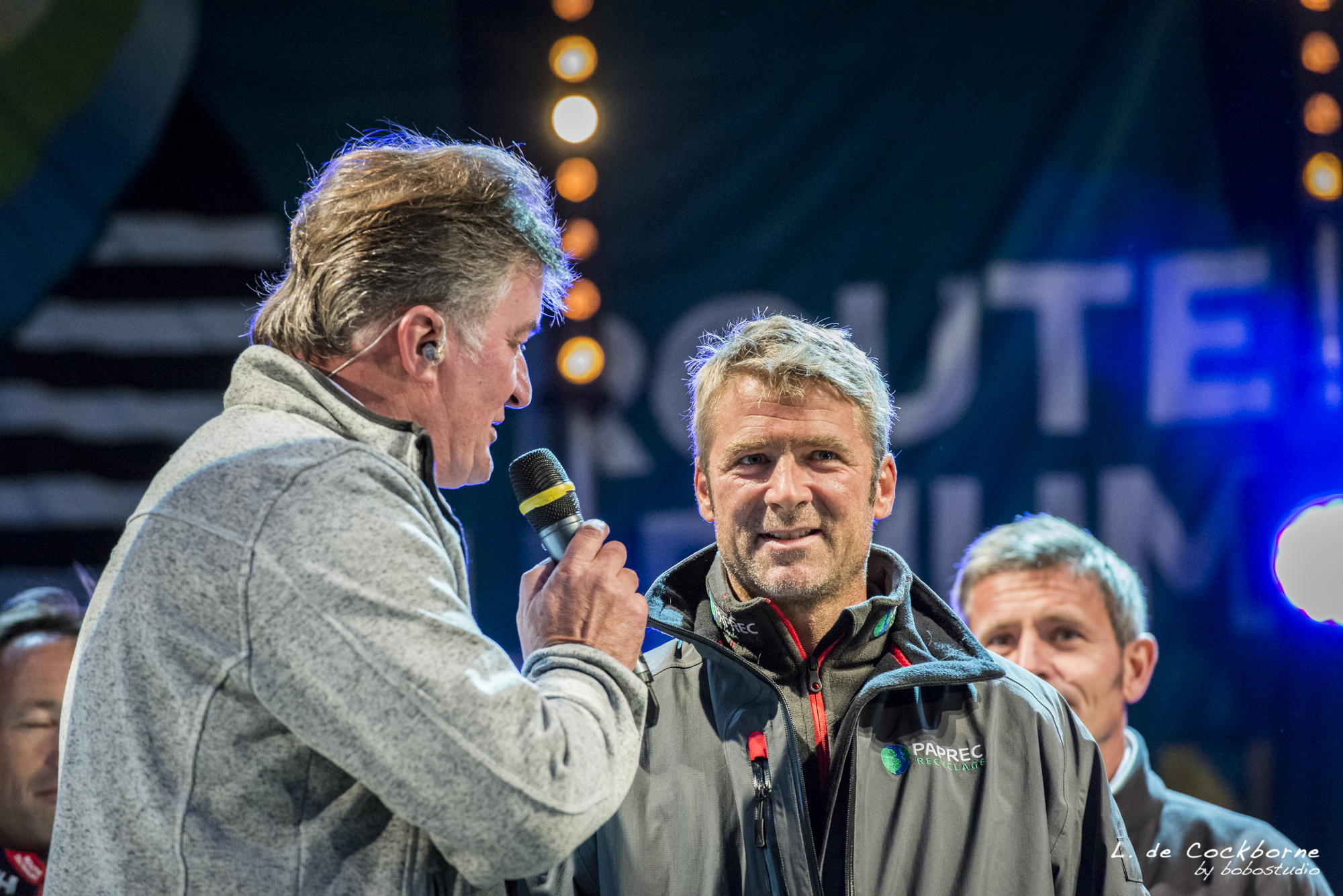

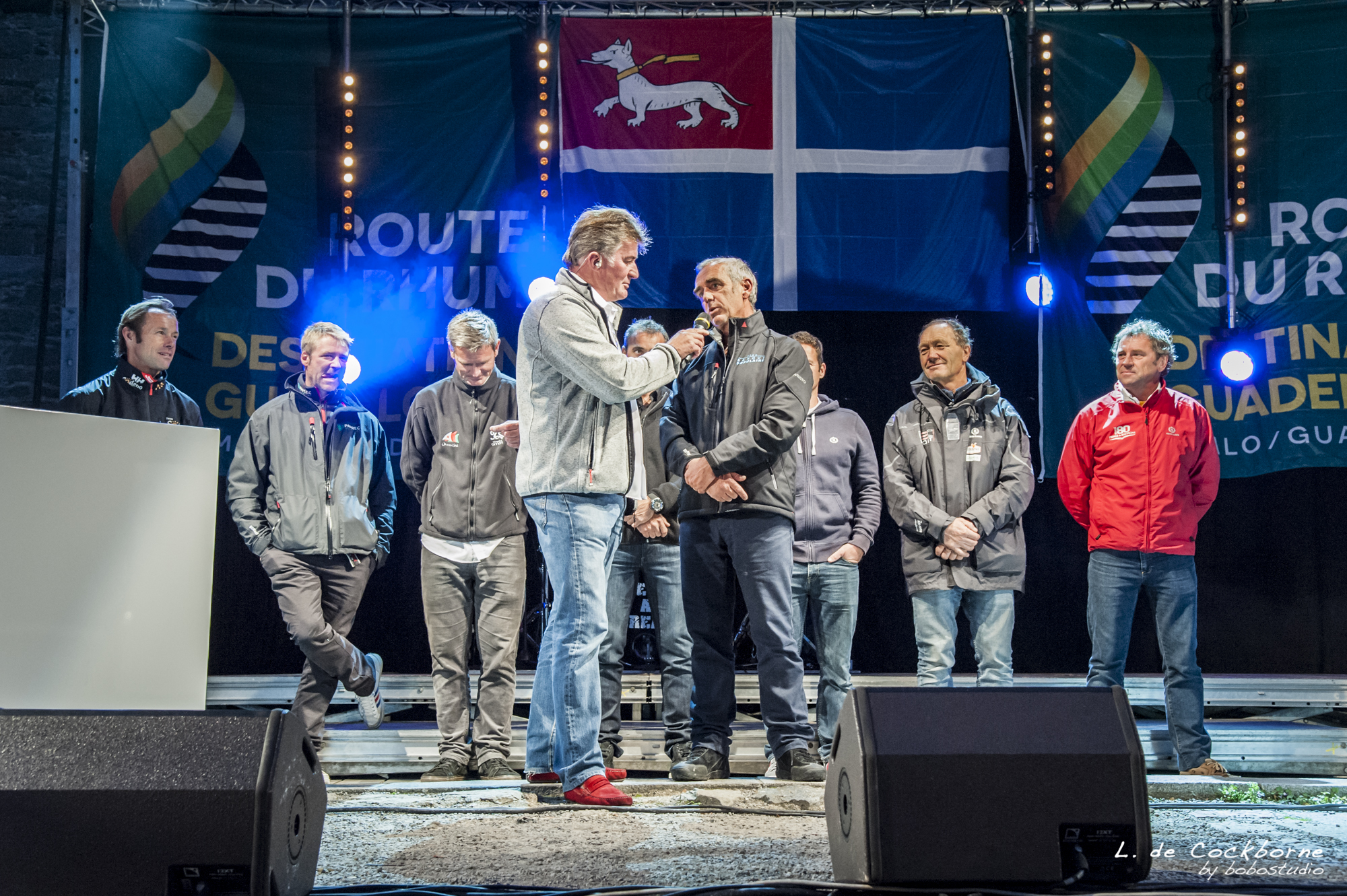

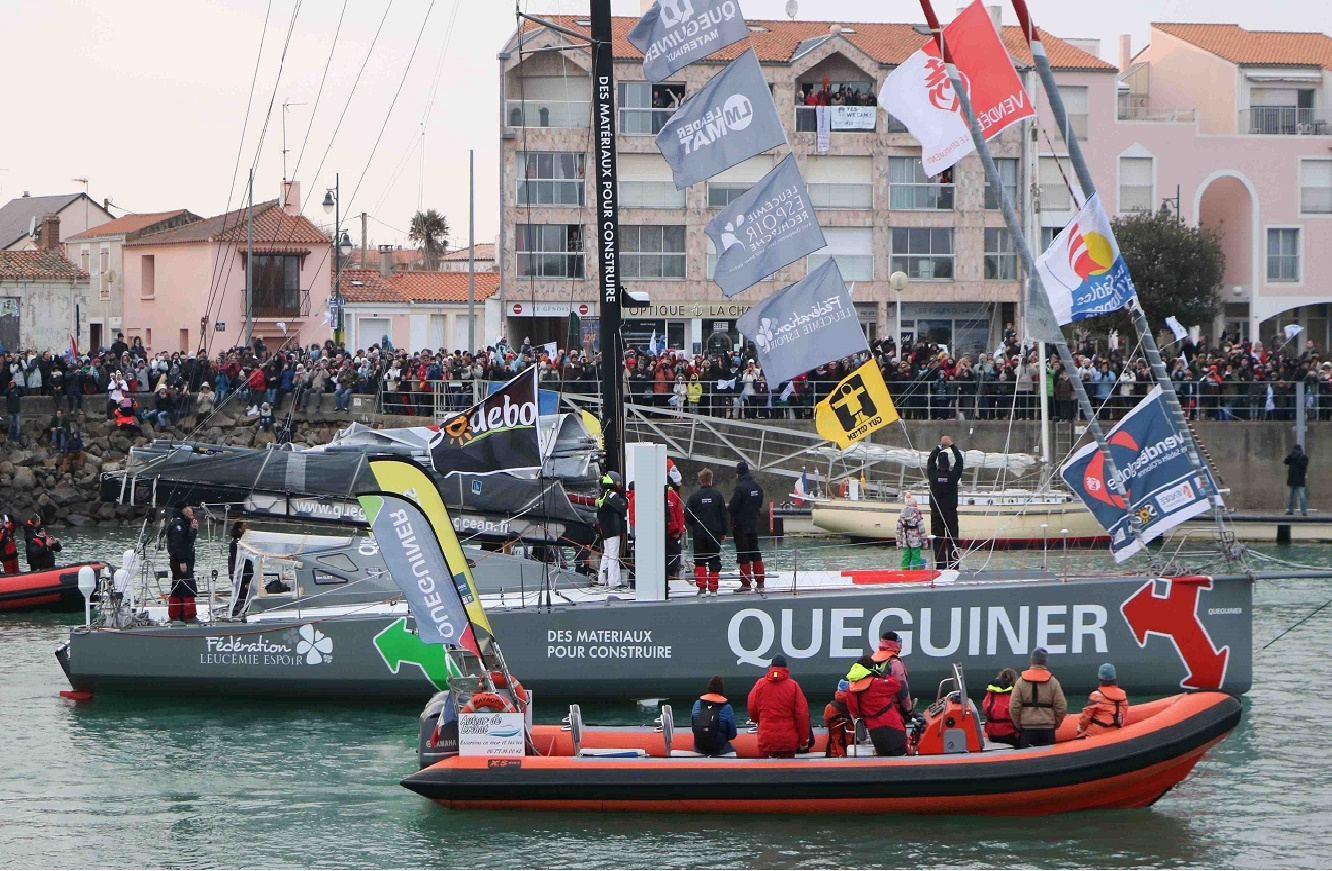

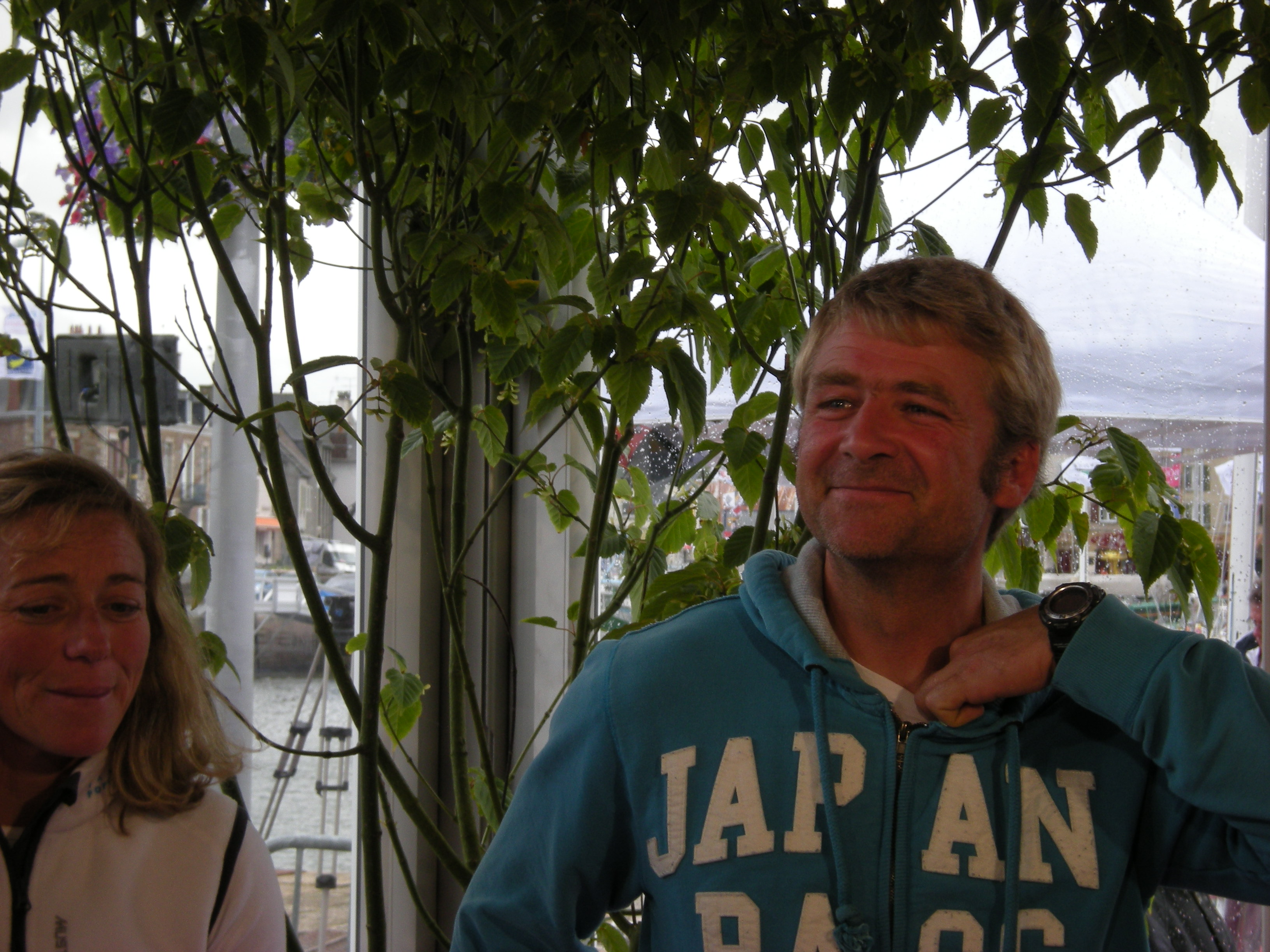

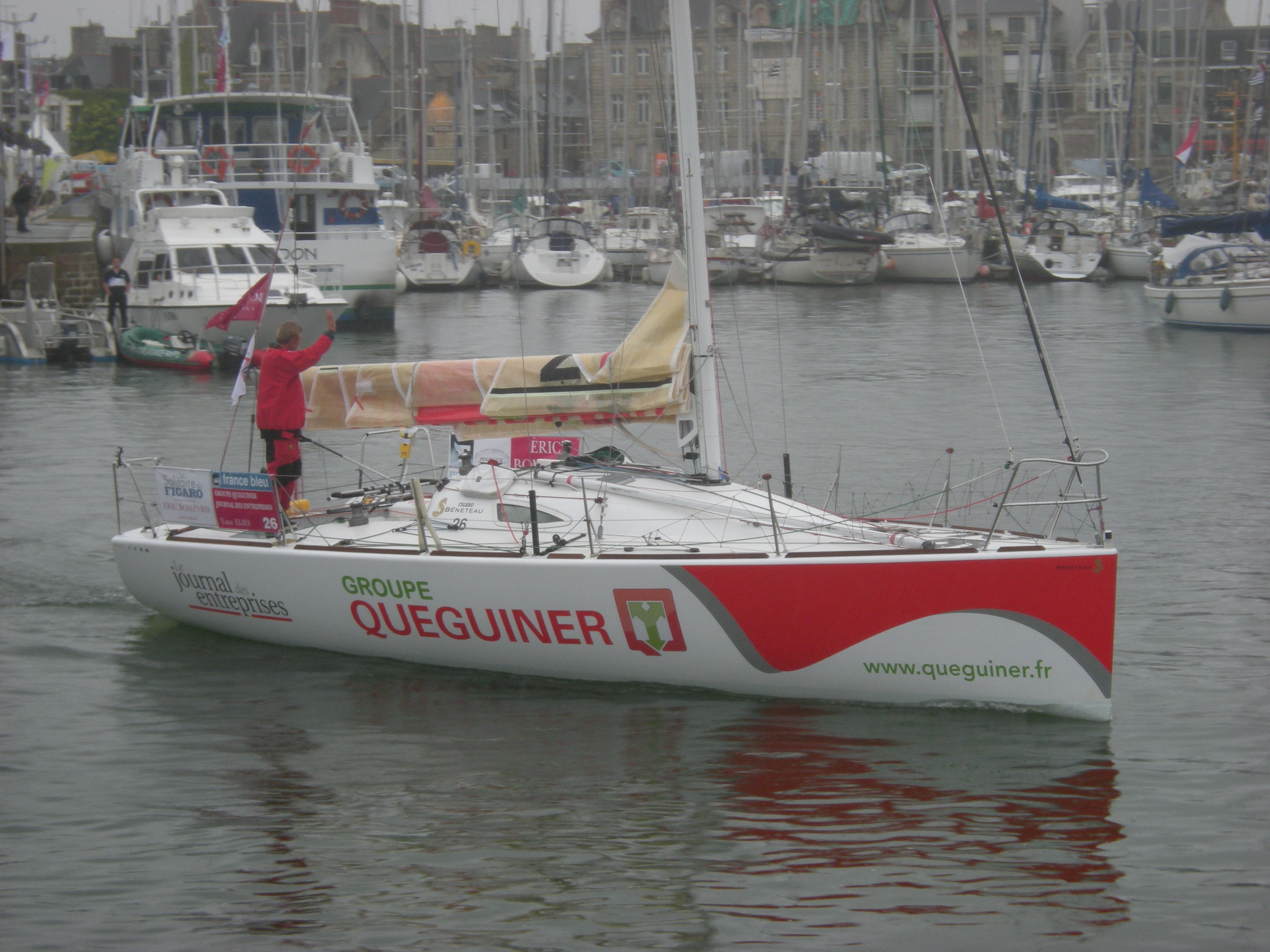

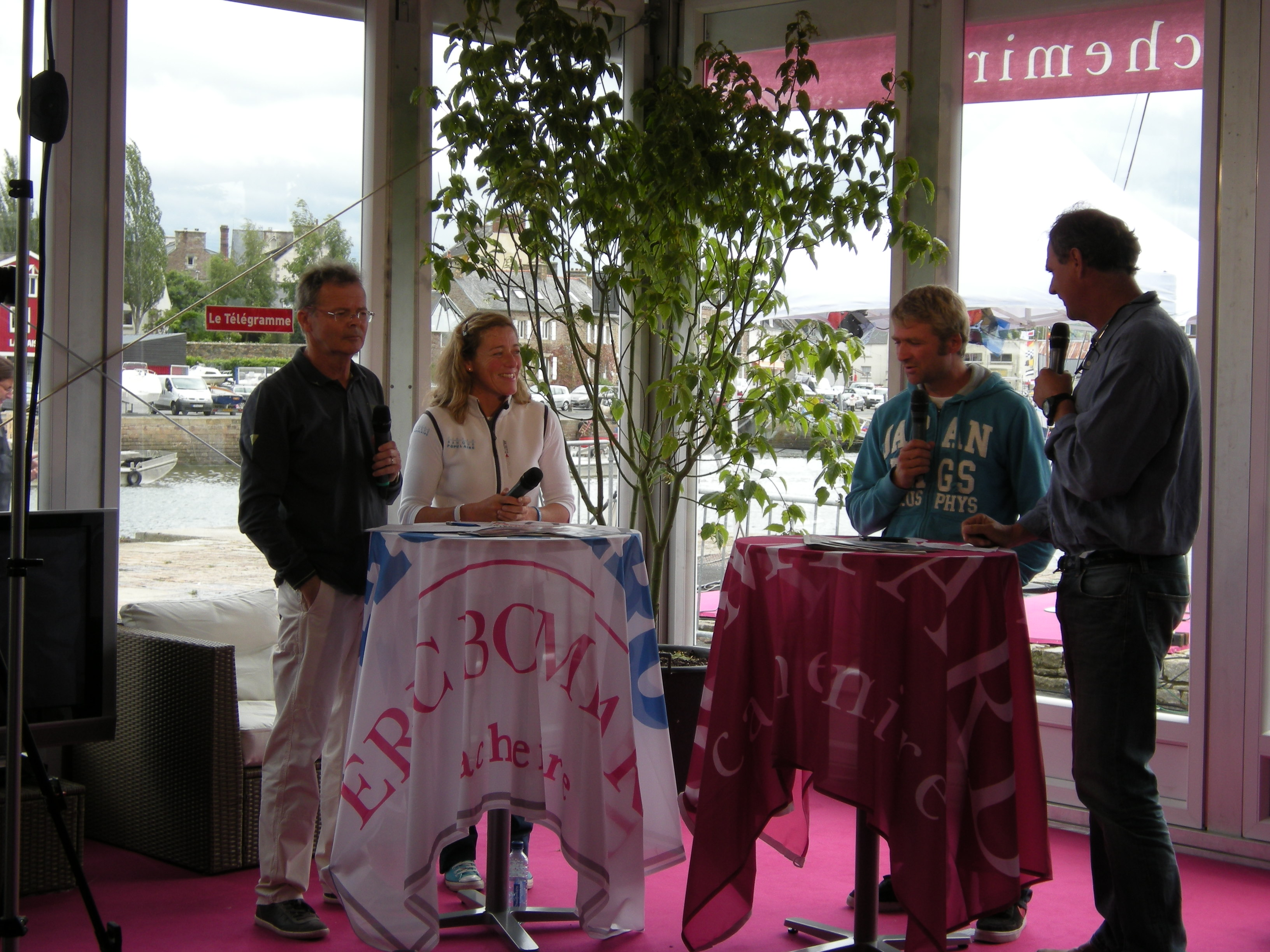

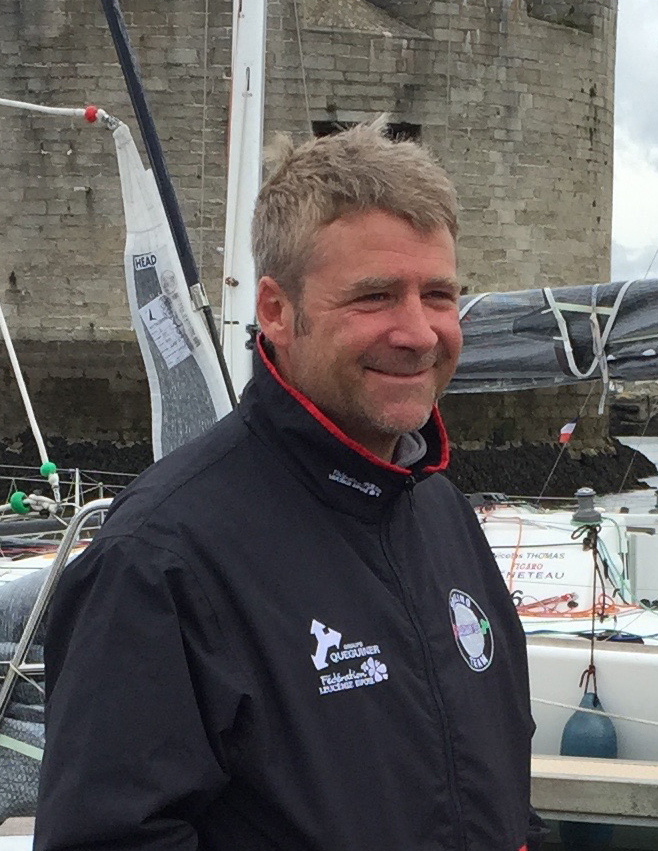

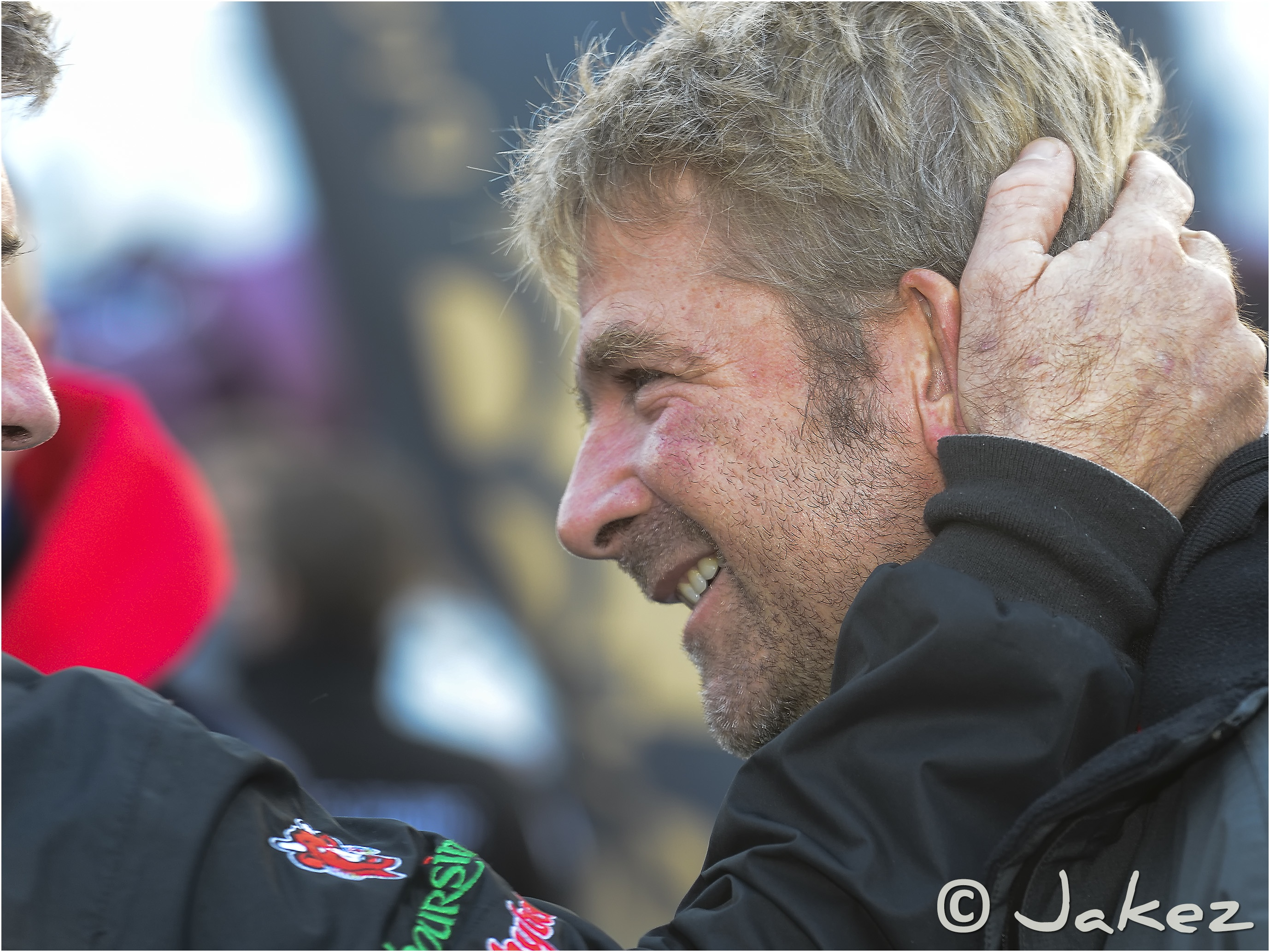

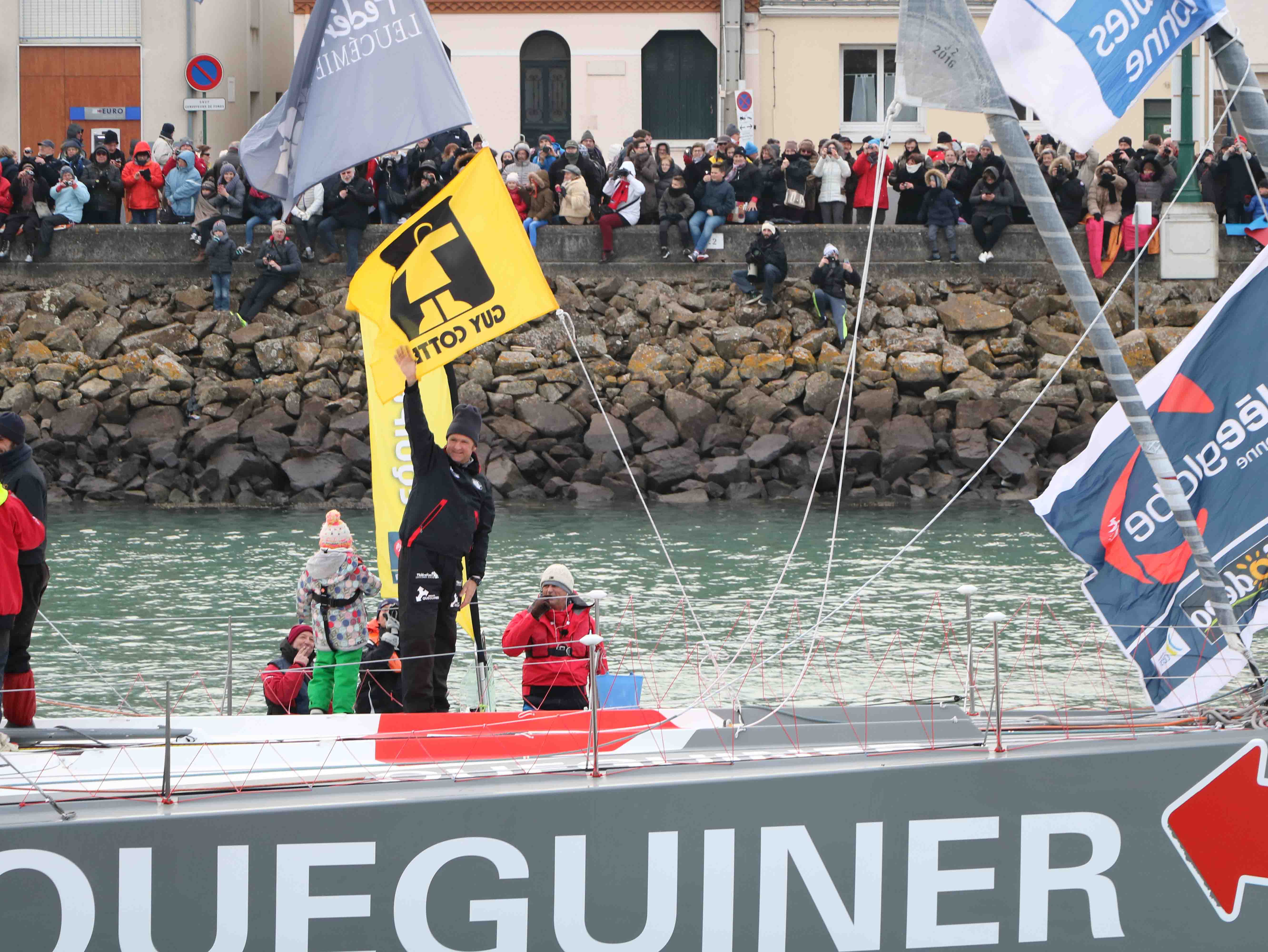

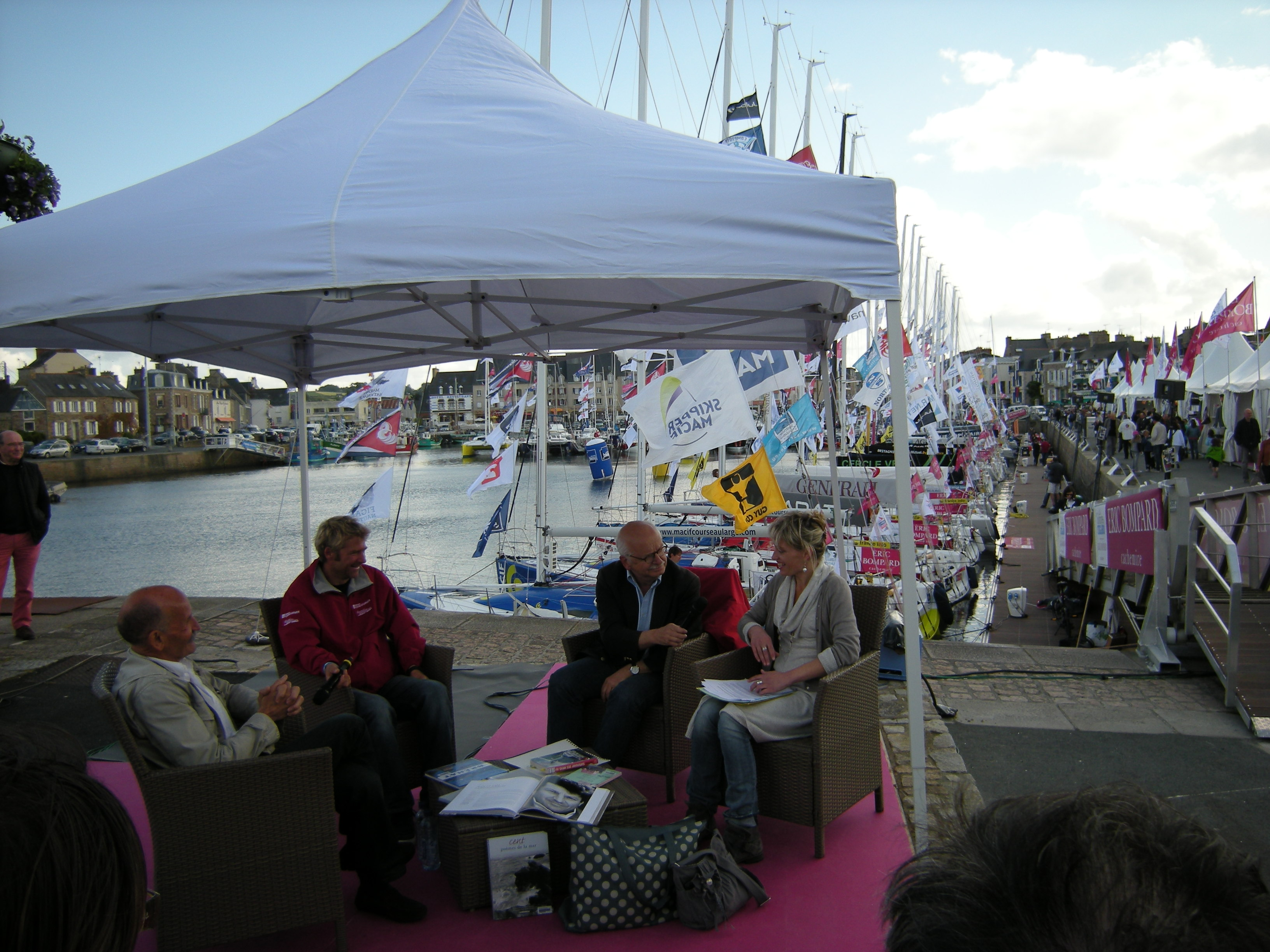

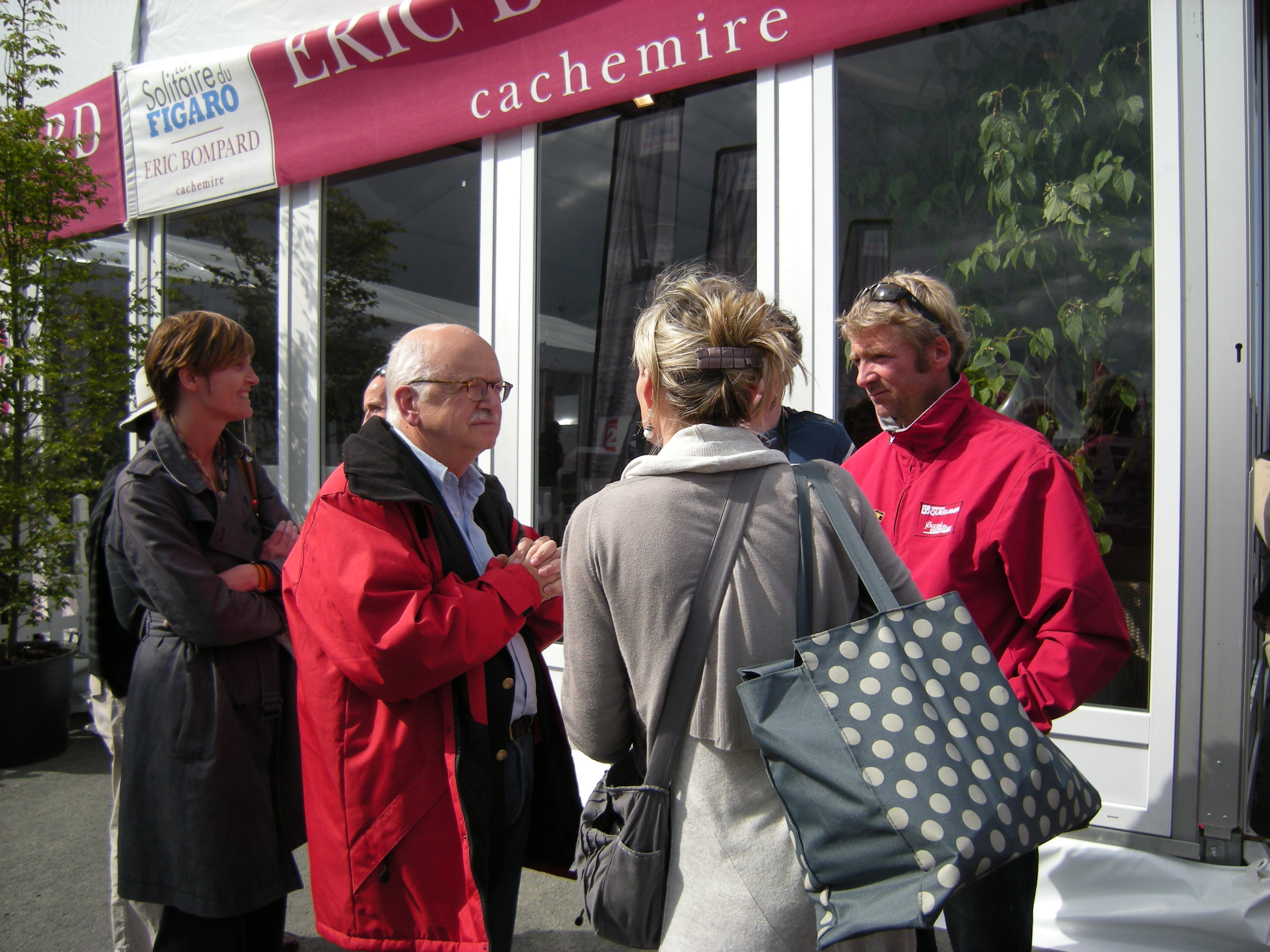

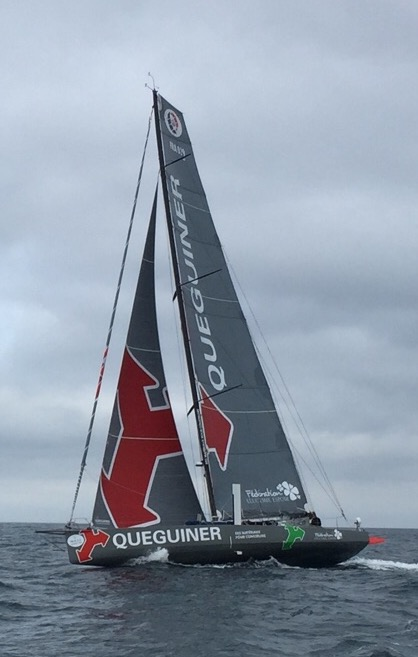

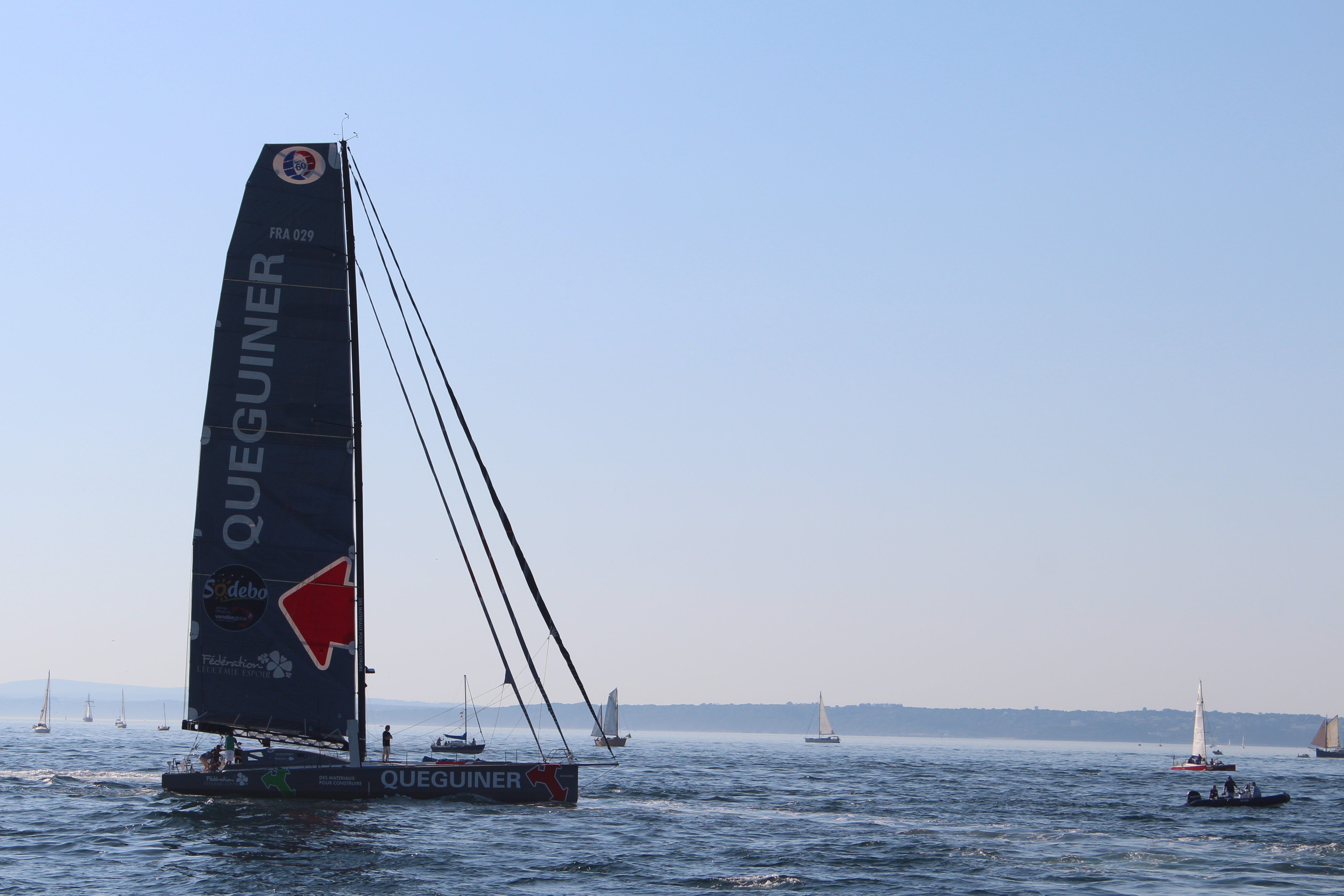

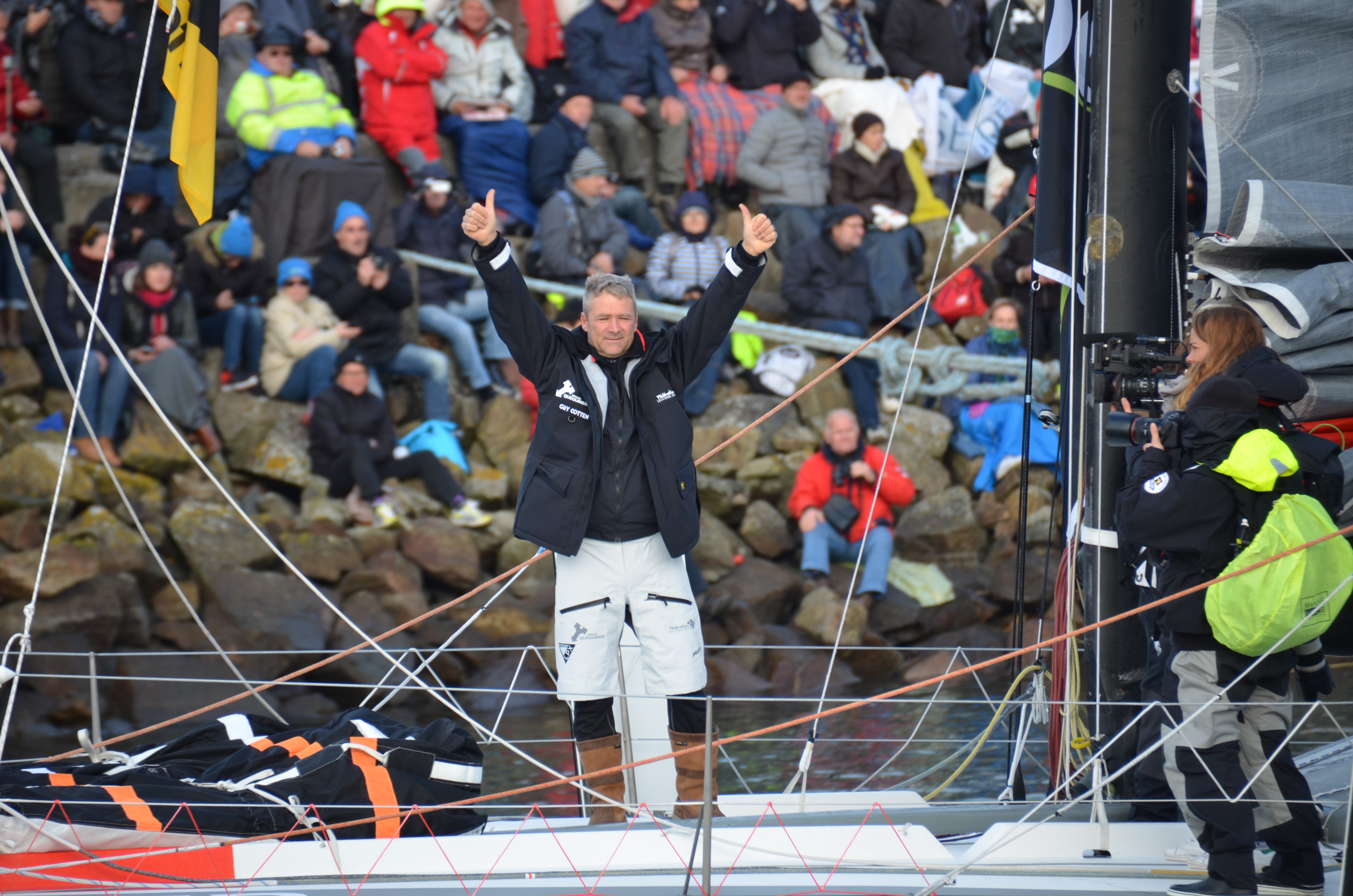

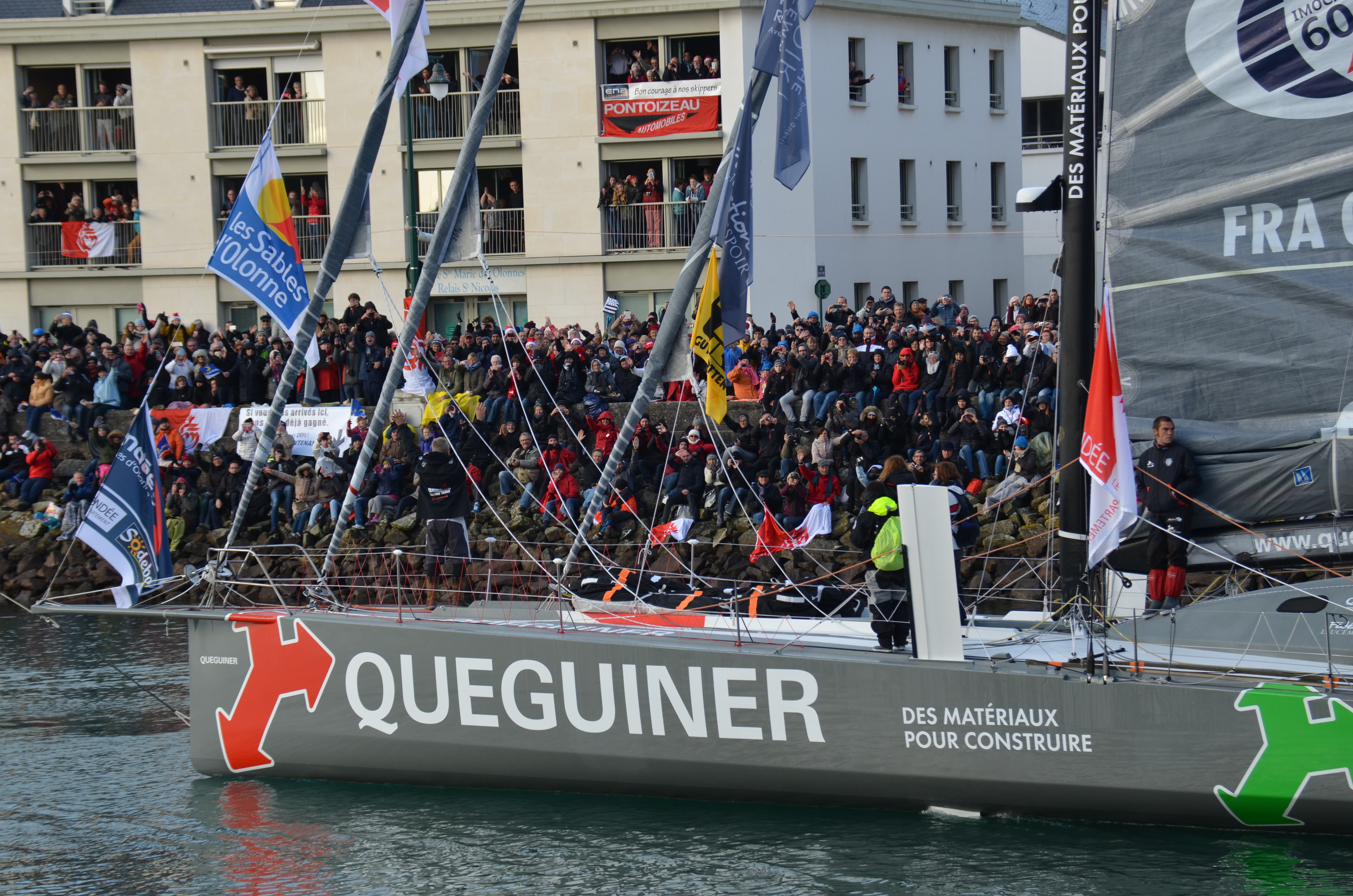

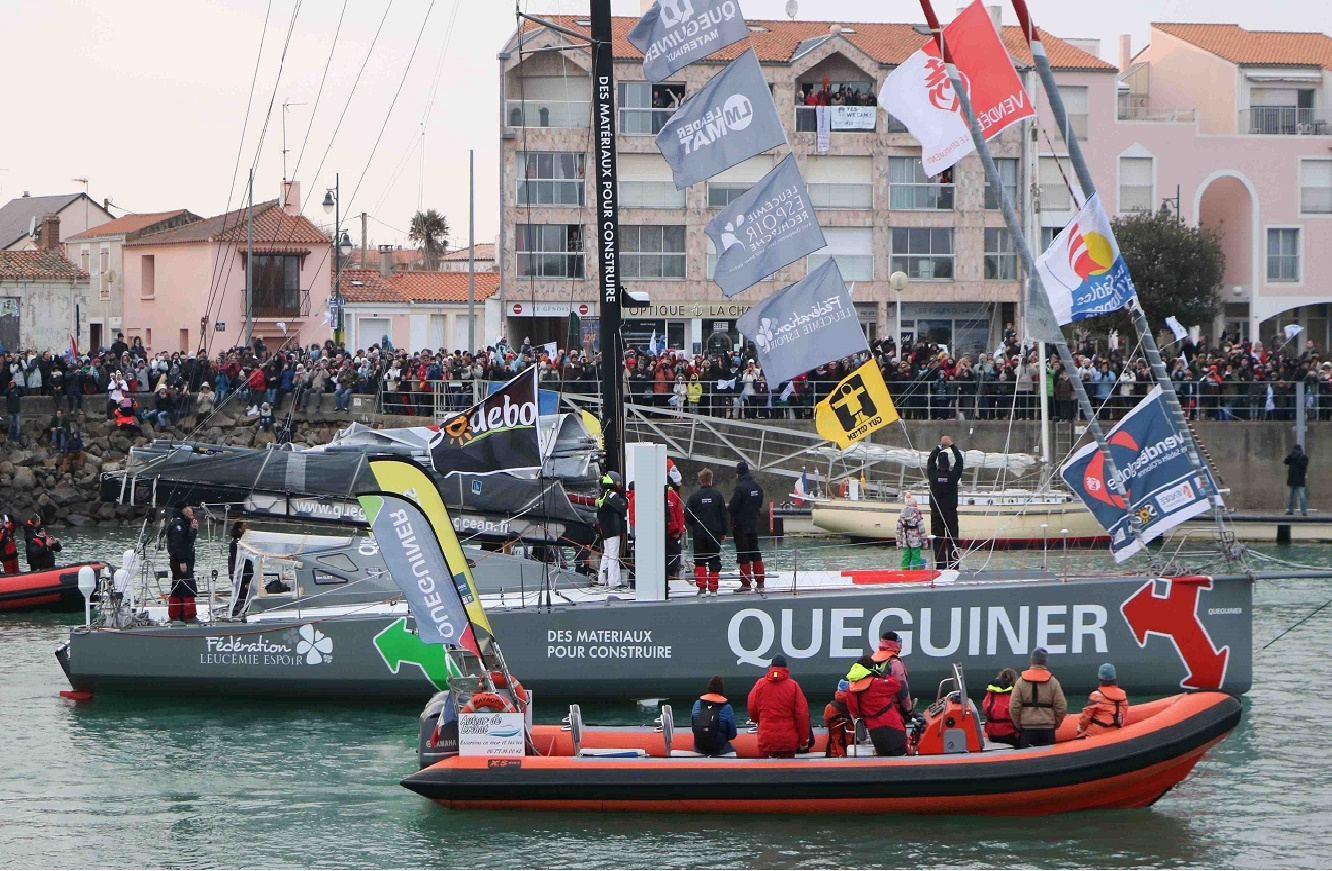

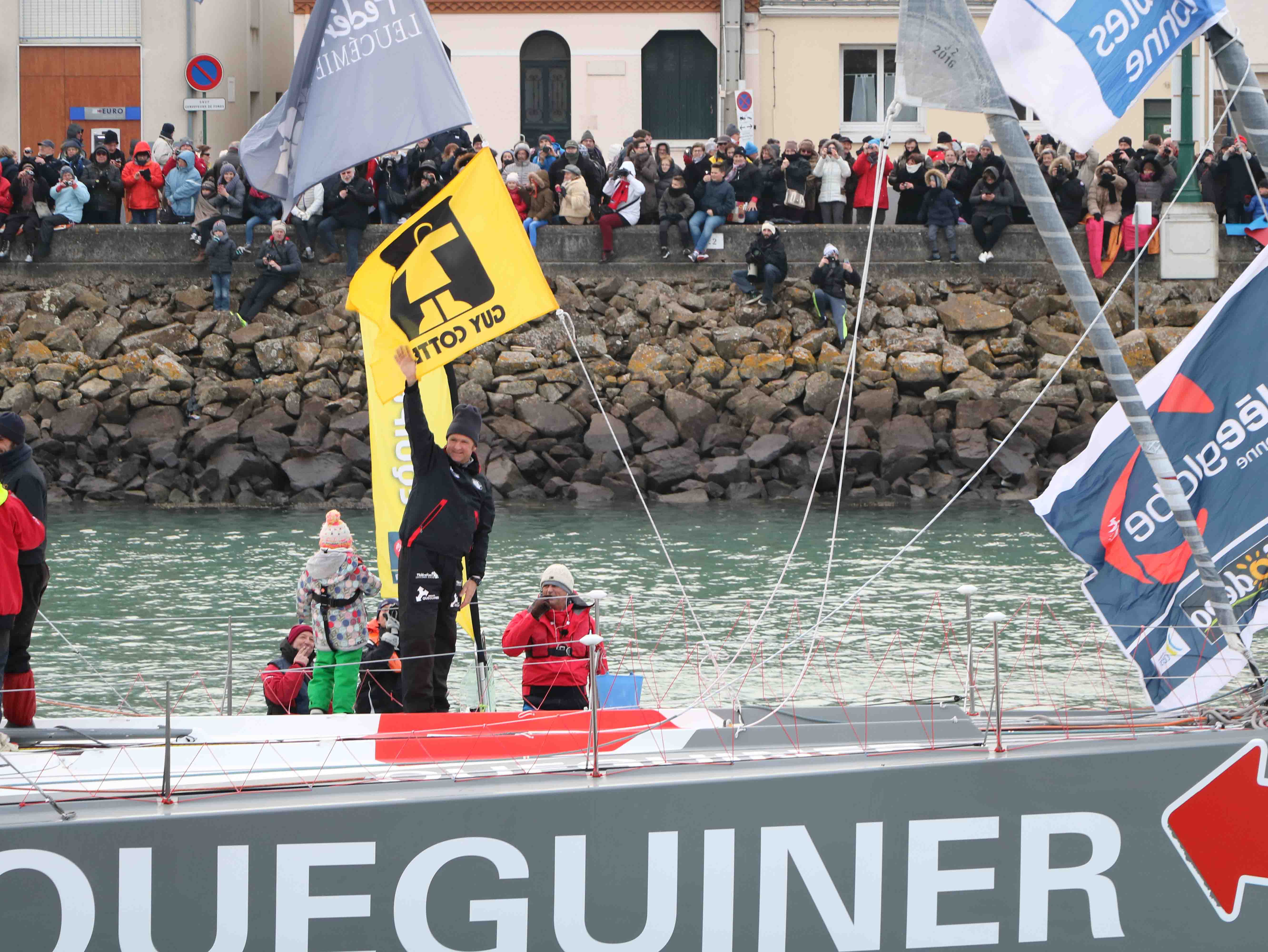
