= Tom Dolan (sailor) =

Irish offshore sailor

Personal information
- Nationality: Irish
- Born: 23 April 1987 (age 38) Moynalty, County Meath, Ireland

Sport

Sailing career
- Class: IMOCA 60, Figaro

Tom Dolan (born 23 April 1987) is an Irish offshore sailor.. He was the first Irish winner of the Solitaire du Figaro solo offshore racing series, which he won in 2024.

== Early life ==
Dolan grew up in Moynalty, Co Meath, where he was raised on a farm.

== Sailing ==
Dolan first learned to sail in a small dinghy on Lough Ramor, in a boat his father bought via an ad in Buy And Sell Magazine. After that early introduction, he would return to sailing years later when taking a course in outdoor education in Coláiste Dhúlaigh. Dolan found work at the Glénans sailing base in Baltimore, County Cork, where he built on his sailing and seamanship skills. From there, he moved to France to pursue a career on the offshore sailing circuit, first in the Mini class, moving up to the Figaro class.

Dolan has competed in the Solitaire du Figaro eight times, winning it in 2024. He was forced to withdraw from the 2025 edition of the race with a hand injury picked up on the first leg.

In 2025 Dolan competed in the IMOCA class, sailing both the Course Des Caps race and the Fastnet Race with the Charal Racing team, skippered by Jeremie Beyou. The team finished second in the Fastnet Race.

Dolan was named Irish Sailor of the Year in 2024 by Irish Sailing and Ireland Afloat Magazine, following his Figaro win
