= Transat AG2R =

- First held: 1992
- Organizer: OC Sport Pen Duick
- Type: two person transatlantic race
- Classes: Present - Beneteau Figaro 3 Former - Beneteau Figaro 2 Former - Beneteau Figaro
- Start: Concarneau - France
- Finish: Saint Barts
- Website: www.transatendouble.bzh

The La Transat Paprec formally known as the Transat AG2R and the La Transat en Double is a two-person transatlantic race which is held biannually in one design Beneteau Figaro boats. The present iteration being the Beneteau Figaro 3.

The 2023 was the first edition to have a gender requirement. With a mixed gender crew required. Mixed sailing had come to the forefront as World Sailing as it helped increase female.

== Winners ==
Ed.	Year	Class	Starter	Finishers	Boat name	Crew	Time	Ref.
1	1992	Beneteau Figaro	16	14	SILL PLEIN FRUIT - FR3	Jacques Caraes (FRA); Michel Desjoyeaux (FRA)	24d 08h 40s 34m	
2	1994	Beneteau Figaro	21	20	SILL PLEIN FRUIT - FR3	Jean Le Cam (FRA); Roland Jourdain (FRA)	20d 20h 34s 26m	
3	1996	Beneteau Figaro	19	16	BROCELIANDE	Alain Gautier (FRA); Jimmy Pahun (FRA)	24d 11h 54s 32m	
4	1998	Beneteau Figaro	24	23	NINTENDO 64	Bruno Jourdren (FRA); Marc Guessard (FRA)	22d 14h 24s 11m	
5	2000	Beneteau Figaro	42	30	SERGIO TACCHINI – ITINERIS	Karine Fauconnier (FRA); Lionel Lemonchois (FRA)	27d 09h 50s 38m	
6	2002	Beneteau Figaro	25	25	COLBERT ORCO	Hervé Laurent (FRA); Rodolphe Jacq (FRA)	22d 13h 06s 55m	
7	2004	Beneteau Figaro 2	31	31	GROUPE SCE – LE TELEGRAMME	Armel Le Cleac'h (FRA); Nicolas Troussel (FRA)	20d 08h 49s 35m	
8	2006	Beneteau Figaro 2	28	25	GROUPE BEL	Christophe De Pavant (FRA); Pietro D’Ali (ITA)	19d 22h 24s 30m	
9	2008	Beneteau Figaro 2	26	23	SNEF et Cliptol Sport	Laurent Pellecuer (FRA); Jean-Paul Mouren (FRA)	22d 19h 13s 55m	
10	2010	Beneteau Figaro 2	25	25	BRIT AIR	Armel Le Cleac'h (FRA); Fabien Delahaye (FRA)	22d 16h 59s 11m	
11	2012	Beneteau Figaro 2	16	16	GREEN CIRCLE	Gildas Morvan (FRA); Charlie Dalin (FRA)	22d 08h 55s 45m	
12	2014	Beneteau Figaro 2	15	13	SAFRAN - GUY COTTEN	Gwenolé Gahinet (FRA); Paul Meilhat (FRA)	22d 06h 17s 59m	
13	2016	Beneteau Figaro 2	15	14	GEDIMAT	Thierry Chabagny (FRA); Erwan Tabarly (FRA)	22d 01h 06s 53m	
14	2018	Beneteau Figaro 2	19	16	AGIR Recouvrement	Adrien Hardy (sailor) (FRA); Thomas Ruyant (FRA)	18d 11h 48s 22m	
15	2021	Beneteau Figaro 3	18	18	TeamWork	Nils Palmieri (SUI); Julien Villion (FRA)	18d 05h 08s 03m	
16	2023	Beneteau Figaro 3	11	11	MACIF	Lois Berrehar (FRA); Charlotte Yven (FRA)	18d 19h 01m 33s	
17	2025	Beneteau Figaro 3	20	18	MACIF	Charlotte Yven (FRA); Yven Dhallenne (FRA)	18d 19h 16m 54s	

== Editions ==
=== 1992 ===
Pos.	Sail No.	Boat name	Crew	Time	Ref.
1	FRA 37	SILL PLEIN FRUIT	Jacques Caraes (FRA); Michel Desjoyeaux (FRA)	24d 08h 40m 34s	
2	FRA 36	ENO	Frédéric Leclere (FRA); Loïc Blanken (FRA)	24d 09h 11m 56s	
3		SILL LA POTAGERE	Roland Jourdain (FRA); Jean-Luc Nelias (FRA)	24d 11h 31m 22s	
4	FRA 34	CLIPS ENTREPRISES	Lionel Lemonchois (FRA); Ronan Guerin (FRA)	d h m s	
5	FRA 19	MORY	Dominic Vittet (FRA); Jean Le Cam (FRA)	d h m s	
6		KER CADELAC BISCUITS	Marc Thiercelin (FRA); Philippe Carpentier (FRA)	d h m s	
7	FRA 6 (Hull 7)	SKIPPER ELF 92	Hervé De Kergariou (FRA); Goulven Guillou (FRA)	d h m s	
8	FRA 46	GTM ENTREPOSE	Damien Grimot (FRA); Luc Bartissol (FRA)	d h m s	
9		DUNKERQUE LE JERSEY DE PARIS	Pierre Castelain (FRA); Pascal Leys (FRA)	26d 16h 01m 00s	
10	FRA 30	REGION NORD PAS DE CALAIS	Alain Comyn (FRA); François Lamiot (FRA)	27d 8h 26m 01s	
11	FRA 25	ARCACHON	Cyril Rognon (FRA); Henri Cormier (FRA)	29d 23h 23m 0s	
12	FRA 32	JRH CONSEIL	Eric Drouglazet (FRA): Roddet (FRA)	30d 04h 36m 58s	
13	FRA 10	FORCE EN ISERE	Loic Pochet (FRA): Pinard (FRA)	30d 05h 59m 07s	
14		CUITAT DE MATARO	Almunzara (FRA); Domingo (FRA)	30d 17h 30m 20s	
RET		Moulinex-Nautic	Jean Paul Mouren (FRA); Francois Coutant (FRA)		
RET		Dottori Eyckeler	Malt (FRA); Arsene Ledertheil (FRA)		

=== 1994 ===
Pos.	Sail No.	Boat name	Crew	Time	Ref.
1		SILL PLEIN FRUIT - FR3	Jean Le Cam (FRA); Roland Jourdain (FRA)	20d 20h 34m 26s	
2	FRA 27	LAITERIES LE GALL	Bertrand De Broc (FRA); Marc Guillemot (FRA)	20d 20h 35m 29s	
3	FRA 30	BRITTANY FERRIES II	Hervé De Kergariou (FRA); Thierry Lacour (FRA)	20d 21h 50m 19s	
4	FRA 2 (hull 19)	OVERFLOTS	Dominic Vittet (FRA); Lionel Peant (FRA)	20d 22h 56m 28s	
5		DLG - WASQUEHAL - CONTINENT	Hans Bouschlote (FRA); Eric Drouglazet (FRA)	21d 01h 23m 18s	
6		CÔTE BASQUE	Pascal Bidégorry (FRA); Cyril Rognon (FRA)	21d 05h 57m 30s	
7		LUNETTES SABANA	Jean-Luc Nelias (FRA); Eric Defaye (FRA)	21d 06h 43m 12s	
8	FRA 39	DOUARNENEZ VILLE DE LA CONSERVE	Loic Blanken (FRA); Gwen Chapalain (FRA)	21d 07h 49m 08s	
9		MATCH RACING	Frederic Leclere (FRA); Raphaël Dinelli (FRA)	21d 08h 17m 56s	
10		LADY J III - VENTURY	Michel Bothuon (FRA); Louis Bopp (FRA)	21d 12h 47m 6s	
11	FRA 97 (Hull 7)	SKIPPER ELF 94	Gilles Chiorri (FRA); Thierry Dubois (FRA)	21d 12h 47m 57s	
12		JE RÊVE OU QUOI ?	Mark Turner (GBR); Marc Michel (FRA)	21d 23h 02m 01s	
13		SILL LA POTAGERE	Christine Briand (FRA); Christine Guillou (FRA)	21d 23h 38m 05s	
14		WHIRPOOL	Catherine Chabaud (FRA); Michele Paret (FRA)	22d 03h 44m 49s	
15		SIDA PREVENTION INFORMATION	F. Louis (FRA); PH. Laot (FRA)	22d 05h 29m 01s	
16		CEYLAN	Guillermo Garcia (Sailor) (FRA); Bruno Garcia (FRA)	22d 23h 48m 48s	
17		CAPES DÔLE GUADELOUPE	S. Bamberg (FRA); Azincourt (FRA)	23d 01h 27m 32s	
18	FRA 46	SPORTS BLANC BLEU	Virginio Bruni (FRA); Stéphane Luca (FRA)	23d 10h 06m 57s	
19		ET MÊME SI J'AVAIS SU !	Gilles Piau (FRA); M. Lubat (FRA)	24d 17h 02m 08s	
20	FRA 48	SO WHAT ?	Sidonie Meraud (FRA); Jacques Toutan (FRA)	25d 04h 34m 58s	
RET		Region Languedoc	Jean Marie Roussillon Vidal (FRA); A. Radier (FRA)		

=== 1996 ===
Pos.	Sail No.	Boat name	Crew	Time	Ref.
1	FRA 8	BROCELIANDE	Alain Gautier (FRA); Jimmy Pahun (FRA)	24d 11h 54m 32s	
2		GUY COTTEN - CHATTAWAK	Florence Arthaud (FRA); Jean Le Cam (FRA)	24d 13h 20m 09s	
3	FRA 9 ou 2 (Hull 7)	SKIPPER ELF	Frank Cammas (FRA); Jean-Luc Nelias (FRA)	24d 15h 35m 09s	
4		SILL PLEIN FRUIT - FR3 OUEST	Roland Jourdain (FRA); Michel Desjoyeaux (FRA)	24d 23h 51m 38s	
5	FRA 61	CUPIDON	Michele Paret (FRA); Dominique Wavre (SUI)	25d 00h 13m 34s	
6	FRA 19	ATHENA ASSURANCES	Serge Madec (FRA); Marc Guillemot (FRA)	25d 07h 09m 04s	
7	FRA 210	LES GARDIENS	Loic Gallon (FRA); Ewen Le Clech (FRA)	25d 07h 08m 34s	
8		VILLE DE DINAN - DLG	Eric Drouglazet (FRA); Marc Thiercelin (FRA)	25d 10h 41m 49s	
9		WEST DIEP YACHTS	Jules Mazars (FRA); Jean Baptiste Epron (FRA)	25d 11h 41m 40s	
10	FRA 8 (hull 28)	FLEURY MICHON	Philippe Poupon (FRA); Luc Poupon (FRA)	25d 18h 01m 40s	
11		PORT DE TREBEURDEN	Jacques Montoriol (FRA); Sébastien Audigane (FRA)	25d 20h 31m 35s	
12		ABERS 96 – LE TELEGRAMME	Jacques Caraes (FRA); Bruno Jourdren (FRA)	26d 02h 08m 29s	
13		IPHIGENIE	Philippe Berquin (FRA); Hervé Siret (FRA)	26d 09h 43m 55s	
14		DCC BARCLAY	Frederic Vidalenc (FRA); Erwan Bellec (FRA)	26d 10h 45m 57s	
15	FRA 5 (95)	LE BISTROT FRANCAIS	Hugues Destremau (FRA); Olivier Wroczynski (FRA)	26d 14h 44m 48s	
16		CARAÏBES AIR CARGO	Claude Bistoquet (FRA); Philippe Cairo (FRA)	26d 22h 09m 30s	
RET		ASSIWA	Christian Wahl (FRA); Michel Vaucher (FRA)		
RET		SEBAGO	Pascal Bidégorry (FRA); Hervé De Kergariou (FRA)		
RET		LILLE 2004	Dominic Vittet (FRA); Loic Blanken (FRA)		

=== 1998 ===
Pos.	Sail No.	Boat name	Crew	Time	Ref.
1	FRA 31	NINTENDO 64	Bruno Jourdren (FRA); Marc Guessard (FRA)	22d 14h 24m 11s	
2	FRA 19	CARREFOUR PREVENTION	Dominique Wavre (SUI); Michèle Paret (FRA)	22d 14h 43m 21s	
3	97 (Hull 97)	MARSEILLE ENTREPRISES QUALITE	Jean-Paul Mouren (FRA); Laurent Pellecuer (FRA)	22d 14h 47m 19s	
4	FRA 98	ANDOUILLES TRISKEL	Hervé Laurent (FRA); Hervé De Kergariou (FRA)	d h m s	
5	FRA (Hull 7)	SKIPPER ELF	Damian Foxall (IRL); Sidney Gavignet (FRA)	d h m s	
6		GUY COTTEN - CHATTAWAK	Jean Le Cam (FRA); Florence Arthaud (FRA)	d h m s	
7		GROUPE LOUIS SANDERS	Ronan Guerin (FRA); Ronan Cointo (FRA)	d h m s	
8		GROUPAMA	Frank Cammas (FRA); Michel Desjoyeaux (FRA)	d h m s	
9	FRA 51	TERRE LUNE	Y. Fauconnier (FRA); Karinne Fauconnier (FRA)	d h m s	
10		UN UNIVERS DE SERVICES	Bertrand De Broc (FRA); Jimmy Pahun (FRA)	d h m s	
11		DOUARNENEZ 98	Antoine Koch (FRA); Andre Malejac (FRA)	d h m s	
12		SILL PLEIN FRUIT – FRANCE 3	Roland Jourdain (FRA); Gildas Morvan (FRA)	d h m s	
13		ATHENA ASSURANCES	Jean-Luc Nelias (FRA); Thierry Peponnet (FRA)	d h m s	
14		TED LAPIDUS DEFENDERS	Eric Drouglazet (FRA); Sébastien Audigane (FRA)	d h m s	
15		AGF SAINT-BARTH ASSURANCES	Kristoffer Jonsson (FRA); Guillaume Barraud (FRA)	d h m s	
16		FLEURY MICHON	Philippe Poupon (FRA); Luc Poupon (FRA)	d h m s	
17		MC DONALD'S ATLANTIQUE	Yannick Lemonnier (FRA); David Ravet (FRA)	d h m s	
18		VOLKSWAGEN - CASTROL	Jérémie Beyou (FRA); Armel Le Cleac'h (FRA)	d h m s	
19		INFOGEN	Gael De France (FRA); N. Slivaritch (FRA)	d h m s	
20		JUST MARIETTE	Christophe Mariette (FRA); Helene Mariette (FRA)	d h m s	
21		SEAFAX	Erci Savant-Ros (FRA); Karim Ben Ghanem (FRA)	d h m s	
22		ASTROLABE, VIVEZ LA MER	Laurent Colombet (FRA); Jean Luc Macron (FRA)	d h m s	
23		ALLIANCE EUROPEENNE DE CADRES	Oliver Larrat (FRA); Thomas Levesque (FRA)	d h m s	
RET		Ferme de Magne - Royan	Alexandre Peraud (FRA); William Kostyra (FRA)		

=== 2000 ===
Pos.	Sail No.	Boat name	Crew	Time	Ref.
1	FRA 51	SERGIO TACCHINI – ITINERIS	Karine Fauconnier (FRA); Lionel Lemonchois (FRA)	27d 09h 50m 38s	
2		CERCLE VERT	Gildas Morvan (FRA); Bertrand De Broc (FRA)	27d 13h 56m 30s	
3		VOLKSWAGEN CASTROL	Jérémie Beyou (FRA); Pascal Bidégorry (FRA)	27d 15h 35m 23s	
4		BCG - X – HEC	Tanguy Lesselin (FRA); Charles Caudrelier-Benac (FRA)	27d 22h 57m 23s	
5		FLEXIPAN	Gilles Chiorri (FRA); Dominic Vittet (FRA)	28d 01h 32m 52s	
6		LISSAC OPTICIEN	Ronan Cointo (FRA); Christophe Lebas (FRA)	28d 02h 23m 43s	
7		GROUPE GENERALI ASSURANCES	Yann Eliès (FRA); Ronan Guerin (FRA)	28d 08h 16m 58s	
8		JACQUES VABRE	Franck Proffit (FRA); Damian Foxall (IRL)	28d 09h 20m 24s	
9	FRA 28	FLEURY MICHON	Luc Poupon (FRA); Yves Pajot (FRA)	28d 13h 50m 39s	
10		CREALINE&CARVEN – DAVID OLIVIER	Eric Drouglazet (FRA); Sébastien Josse (FRA)	28d 14h 32m 17s	
11		LES TORTUES A CARAPACES MOLLES	Christophe De Pavant (FRA); Gilles Rabaud (FRA)	28d 15h 51m 52s	
12		FLEURY MICHON	Philippe Poupon (FRA); Florence Arthaud (FRA)	28d 16h 41m 40s	
13		McDONALD'S LA ROCHELLE	Yannick Lemonnier (FRA); C. Sayer (FRA)	28d 21h 21m 16s	
14		TERRE&MER – ARMOR LUX	Jerome Picard (FRA); Pierre Yves Collet (FRA)	28d 21h 54m 08s	
15	FRA 97 (Hull 7)	MARSEILLE ENTREPRISES	Jean-Paul Mouren (FRA); Laurent Pellecuer (FRA)	29d 02h 33m 19s	
16		GALANZ, FOURS A MICRO-ONDES	Sébastien Audigane (FRA); N. Audigane (FRA)	29d 03h 42m 32s	
17		YPREMA, L'ECOLOGIE INDUSTRIELLE	Sidney Gavignet (FRA); Isabelle Autissier (FRA)	29d 03h 57m 14s	
18		CIMENTS CALCIA	Michel Bothuon (FRA); Yann Jameson (FRA)	29d 06h 10m 44s	
19	FRA 95	ARMOR LUX THOMSON CSF COMSYS	Erwan Tabarly (FRA); Patrick Tabarly (FRA)	29d 22h 13m 02s	
20	FRA 46	FORCE BUREAUTIQUE OCEI	Damien Grimont (FRA); Laurent Bignolas (FRA)	30d 09h 42m 30s	
21	FRA 30	NICOLAS FEUILLATE	Hervé De Kergariou (FRA); Jean-Marie Chapalain (FRA)	31d 02h 40m 09s	
22		LYCEES MARITIMES DE BRETAGNE ASSYSTEM	Yannig Livory (FRA); Philippe Bothorel (FRA)	31d 05h 16m 29s	
23		DELTA DORE	Jean Ado (FRA); J.M. Hoarau (FRA)	31d 05h 37m 29s	
24		CAPRI	Jacques Einhorn (FRA); Pierre Rolland (sailor) (FRA)	31d 10h 13m 06s	
25		AGF ST BARTH ASSURANCES	Markku Harmala (FRA); Richard Ledee (FRA)	31d 11h 27m 14s	
26	FRA 129	HI SPACE	Christian Bos (FRA); Loic Merlin (FRA)	31d 11h 40m 03s	
27	FRA 23	GUYADER	Pascal Rialland (FRA); Vincent Dagault (FRA)	31d 13h 04m 40s	
28	FRA 39	« TRES » ROYAN	Alexandre Peraud (FRA); William Kostyra (FRA)	32d 04h 30m 41s	
29	FRA 123	BOMBYX	Daniel Deneve (FRA); Cathy Rochedreux (FRA)	32d 07h 12m 58s	
30		FRAM FILTERS	Franck Le Gal (FRA); Philippe Cai Gnec (FRA)	32d 13h 02m 59s	
ABN		POKEMON	Bruno Jourdren (FRA); Marc Guessard (FRA)		
ABN		CORSICA, VILLE DE CALVI	Laurent Nabard (FRA); Laurent Massot (FRA)		
ABN		DGI 2000	Rolf Toulorge (FRA); Alexandre Toulorge (FRA)		
ABN		COTENTIN, CE PAYS COMME UNE ILE LE	Bruno Le Toux (FRA); Thierry Lacour (FRA)		
ABN		SOS ENFANCE EN DANGER	Alain D'Eudeville (FRA); Thierry Fournier-Foch (FRA)		
ABN		TRANSAT 2000	Alain Ferec (FRA); Guillaume Got (FRA)		
ABN		PILOT	Antoine Canovas (FRA); Christophe Bouvet (FRA)		
ABN		LTP LOCANORD	Romain Attanasio (FRA); Pascal Doin (FRA)		
ABN		UHARTZ	Amaiur Alfaro (FRA); Etienne Carra (FRA)		
ABN		ANTIGUA	B. De L'Epinois (FRA); B. Hudault (FRA)		
ABN		PINDARNET	Emma Richards (Sailor) (GBR); Miranda Merron (GBR)		
ABN		HALLES MANDAR	Jean-Baptiste L'Ollivier (FRA); Jean-Baptiste Epron (FRA)		

=== 2002 ===
Pos.	Sail No.	Boat name	Crew	Time	Ref.
1	FRA 28	COLBERT ORCO	Hervé Laurent (FRA); Rodolphe Jacq (FRA)	22d 13h 06m 55s	
2	FRA 97 (Hull 7)	MARSEILLE ENTREPRISES	Jean-Paul Mouren (FRA); Alexandre Toulorge (FRA)	22d 23h 44m 36s	
3		ESCAL'ATLANTIC SAINT-NAZAIRE	Ronan Guerin (FRA); Ronan Cointo (FRA)	23d 02h 09m 36s	
4		JEAN FLOC'H	Eric Drouglazet (FRA); Vincent Riou (FRA)	23d 04h 45m 13s	
5		THALES ARMOR LUX	Erwan Tabarly (FRA); Philippe Vicariot (FRA)	23d 06h 05m 00s	
6		PETIT NAVIRE LE BON GOÛT DU LARGE	Thierry Chabagny (FRA); Corentin Douguet (FRA)	23d 09h 59m 41s	
7		AFFICHES PARISIENNES	Jean-Christophe Caso (FRA); Daniel Vallancien (FRA)	23d 13h 43m 56s	
8		CERCLE VERT	Gildas Morvan (FRA); Charles Caudrelier-Benac (FRA)	23d 14h 28m 58s	
9		GAME BOY ADVANCE	Bruno Jourdren (FRA); Jérémie Beyou (FRA)	23d 14h 54m 05s	
10		ST-BARTH ASSURANCES	Markku Härmäla (FRA); Richard Ledee (FRA)	23d 18h 10m 53s	
11		HAPPYCALOPSE	Philippe Cardis (FRA); Alexandre Schneiter (SUI)	23d 19h 30m 28s	
12		DEPARTEMENT DE L'AISNE	Jeanne Grégoire (FRA); Arnaud Boissieres (FRA)	23d 21h 23m 06s	
13		ENTREPRENDRE AU PAYS DE LORIENT	Yannig Livory (FRA); Laurent Massot (FRA)	24d 04h 51m 47s	
14		POLIMMO	François Guiffant (FRA); Guillaume Voizard (FRA)	24d 08h 06m 20s	
15	FRA 27123 (hull 123)	PILOT	Antoine Canovas (FRA); Pierre Peccoud (FRA)	24d 08h 07m 14s	
16		VAR MEDITERRANEE - EJO	Gérard Navarin (FRA); Pierre-Laurent Garnero (FRA)	24d 12h 23m 43s	
17		AVIS – ILE DE SAINT-BARTHELEMY	Luc Poupon (FRA); Jean-François Ledee (FRA)	25d 00h 11m 10s	
18		D&J DEMELLIER & JOULIA	Christophe Bouvet (FRA); Olivier Servettaz (FRA)	25d 01h 12m 03s	
19		SAIL FAST – MARFRET – EVENEMENTS NAUTIQUES	Denis Lemaitre (FRA); Yann Gregoire (FRA)	25d 01h 39m 27s	
20		« TRES » ROYAN	Alexandre Peraud (FRA); William Kostyra (FRA)	25d 03h 14m 51s	
21		BAR DES SPORTS	Hacène Abbar (FRA); Jean-Claude Hervy (FRA)	25d 09h 28m 58s	
22		UHARTZ – ABSOLUT(E)	Amaiur Alfaro (FRA); Vincent Laumaille (FRA)	25d 09h 33m 23s	
23		ONLY	Thierry Lunven (FRA); Thierry Fournier Foch (FRA)	25d 10h 08m 44s	
24		SOS ENFANCE EN DANGER	Alain D'Eudeville (FRA); Loïc Merlin (FRA)	28d 10h 28m 17s	
25		MYRYALIS	Nicolas Troussel (FRA); Armel Le Cleac'h (FRA)	57d 09h 04m 22s	

=== 2004 ===
Pos.	Sail No.	Boat name	Crew	Time	Ref.
1	FRA 1	GROUPE SCE – LE TELEGRAMME	Armel Le Cleac'h (FRA); Nicolas Troussel (FRA)	20d 8h 49m 35s	
2	FRA 40	BANQUE POPULAIRE	Pascal Bidégorry (FRA); Sidney Gavignet (FRA)	20d 10h 19m 15s	
3	FRA 97	PORT DE TREBEURDEN	Romain Attanasio (FRA); Nicolas Berenger (FRA)	20d 15h 20m 53s	
4		BOSTIK FINDLEY	Charles Caudrelier (FRA); Antoine Koch (FRA)	20d 16h 05m 50s	
5		TROPHEE BPE SAINT-NAZAIRE - CUBA	Jeanne Grégoire (FRA); Samantha Davies (GBR)	20d 18h 40m 52s	
6	FRA 4 (Hull 98)	DELTA DORE	Jérémie Beyou (FRA); Christophe De Pavant (FRA)	20d 19h 33m 50s	
7		TRISKEL-BROKERLINE	Marc Thiercelin (FRA); Eric Drouglazet (FRA)	20d 23h 37m 00s	
8		THALES	Erwan Tabarly (FRA); Jean-Luc Nelias (FRA)	21d 00h 51m 36s	
9	FRA 36	PETITS PETONS	Christophe Artaud (FRA); Laurent Pellecuer (FRA)	21d 00h 53m 05s	
10	FRA 70	MAISON PIERRE	Marc Lepesqueux (FRA); Bertrand Lecharpentier (FRA)	21d 01h 13m 45s	
11	FRA 3 (hull 12)	CERCLE VERT	Gildas Morvan (FRA); Dominic Vittet (FRA)	21d 1h 24m 15s	
12	FRA 45	GUYADER L'ESPRIT DE LA MER	Philippe Massu (FRA); Patrice Carpentier (FRA)	21d 02h 44m 46s	
13	FRA 66	SKIPPER AG2R	Rodolphe Jacq (FRA); Bertrand De Broc (FRA)	21d 03h 25m 10s	
14	FRA 57	GEDIMAT	Armel Tripon (FRA); Damien Grimont (FRA)	21d 06h 39m 55s	
15	FRA 16	GROUPE COUPECHOUX	J. Marc Sparfel (FRA); Benoit Lequin (FRA)	21d 07h 03m 15s	
16		CHARENTE-MARITIME SCUTUM	Gérald Véniard (FRA); Yannick Bestaven (FRA)	21d 07h 35m 56s	
17		DEFI SANTE VOILE	Benoît Petit (FRA); Thierry Chabagny (FRA)	21d 07h 58m 35s	
18	FRA 43	D'AUCY	Bruno Jourdren (FRA); J. Christophe Mourniac (FRA)	21d 11h 42m 30s	
19		MARSEILLE ENTREPRISE	Jean-Paul Mouren (FRA); Alexandre Toulorge (FRA)	21d 13h 14m 32s	
20	42	MONACO MARINE GROUP	Albert Spina (FRA); Olivier De Roffignac (FRA)	21d 14h 04m 12s	
21	FRA 28	BEZIERS MEDITERRANEE	Yannick Cano (FRA); Arnaud Boissieres (FRA)	21d 17h 06m 00s	
22		ENTREPRENDRE AU PAYS DE LORIENT	Yannig Livory (FRA); T. Caron (FRA)	21d 17h 44m 30s	
23	FRA 14	RAYNAL ET ROQUELAURE	Christian Bos (FRA); Pierre Yves Moreau (FRA)	21d 20h 25m 0s	
24	NED 23	EGERIA	Sanders S. Bakker (FRA); Ian Munslow (GBR)	22d 00h 35m 25s	
25	FRA 32	FTH-THIRARD – CAEN LA MER	J. Baptiste Dejeanty (FRA); Barnabé Chivot (FRA)	22d 01h 07m 15s	
26	FRA 96 (3)	CONIVENCE	Jacques Einhorn (FRA); Eric Peron (FRA)	22d 13h 51m 50s	
27	FRA 24	L'ESPRIT D'EQUIPE	Lionnel Pean (FRA); Florence Arthaud (FRA)	22d 16h 38m 30s	
28		SOR TMC	Christophe Bouvet (FRA); A. Guillouet (FRA)	22d 19h 24m 42s	
29	NED 58	SPACETIME	Jan Hamester (GER); Sens Hulsebusch (GER)	22d 22h 34m 18s	
30	FRA 99 (9)	AURELIA FINANCE	Hervé Favre (FRA); Guillaume Neu Pietri (FRA)	23d 00h 41m 6s	
31	FRA 47	LITTLE BLACK SHARK	Antonio Pedro Da Cruz (FRA); Olivier De La Motte (FRA)	23d 12h 34m 30s	

=== 2006 ===
Pos.	Sail No.	Boat name	Crew	Time	Ref.
1		GROUPE BEL	Christophe De Pavant (FRA); Pietro D’Ali (ITA)	19d 22h 24m 30s	
2		ATAO AUDIO SYSTEM	Dominic Vittet (FRA); Lionel Lemonchois (FRA)	19d 22h 42m 30s	
3		BANQUE POPULAIRE	Jeanne Grégoire (FRA); Gérald Véniard (FRA)	19d 23h 15m 55s	
4	FRA 18	VEOLIA	Roland Jourdain (FRA); Jean-Luc Nelias (FRA)	19d 23h 19m 35s	
5	FRA 62	BRIT AIR	Armel Le Cleac'h (FRA); Nicolas Troussel (FRA)	19d 23h 40m 14s	
6		E. LECLERC / BOUYGUES TELECOM	Corentin Douguet (FRA); Thierry Chabagny (FRA)	20d 00h 34m 00s	
7		AQUARELLE.COM	Yannick Bestaven (FRA); Ronan Guerin (FRA)	20d 01h 34m 00s	
8	FRA 1 (Hull 96)	DELTA DORE	Jérémie Beyou (FRA); Vincent Riou (FRA)	20d 02h 53m 40s	
9	FRA 7 (Hull 32)	BROSSARD	Frédéric Duthil (FRA); Samuel Manuard (FRA)	20d 03h 59m 45s	
10	FRA 2 (hull 12)	CERCLE VERT	Gildas Morvan (FRA); Erwan Tabarly (FRA)	20d 05h 30m 40s	
11		BOSTIK	Charles Caudrelier (FRA); Nicolas Berenger (FRA)	20d 06h 48m 30s	
12	97	ROXY	Samantha Davies (GBR); Alexia Barrier (FRA)	20d 06h 52m 45s	
13		AXA ATOUT COEUR POUR AIDES	Erik Nigon (FRA); Marc-Pacôme Jouany (FRA)	20d 08h 54m 00s	
14		DES PIEDS ET DES MAINS	Damien Seguin (FRA); Denis Lemaitre (FRA)	20d 09h 59m 45s	
15		SUZUKI AUTOMOBILES	Eric Defert (FRA); Gwenael Riou (FRA)	20d 14h 29m 50s	
16		SIEMENS	Marc Thiercelin (FRA); Oliver Krauss (FRA)	20d 15h 01m 30s	
17		LES MOUSQUETAIRES	Bertrand De Broc (FRA); Benoît Petit (FRA)	20d 15h 11m 15s	
18		LUBEXCEL	Jean-François Pellet (FRA); Jean-Christophe Caso (FRA)	20d 15h 27m 15s	
19		GROUPE CÉLÉOS	Ronan Treussart (FRA); Thomas Rouxel (FRA)	20d 15h 29m 47s	
20		DONNEURS DE VIE - ALL MER	Stanislas Maslard (FRA); Liz Wardley (PNG)	20d 17h 22m 25s	
21		GUY HOQUET IMMOBILIER	Christophe Bouvet (FRA); Laurent Gouezigoux (FRA)	20d 19h 13m 30s	
22		ENTREPRENDRE AU PAYS DE LORIENT	Yannig Livory (FRA); Jean-François Fouche (FRA)	20d 19h 43m 27s	
23	FRA 57	GÉDIMAT	Armel Tripon (FRA); Eric Drouglazet (FRA)	20d 22h 02m 20s	
24		OBJECTIF OCÉANS	Pierre-Emmanuel Pavageau (FRA); Nicolas Bertho (FRA)	21d 20h 36m 00s	
25	FRA 36	PORT OLONNA	Jimmy Le Baut (FRA); Adrien Monsempes (FRA)	22d 00h 11m 36s	
ABD	FRA 43	VIRBAC-PAPREC	Jean-Pierre Dick (FRA); Bruno Jourdren (FRA)		
ABD		ESPRIT 93	Marine Chombart De Lauwe (FRA); Julien Branger (FRA)		
ABD	FRA 96 (3)	ARMOR LUX & SALAÜN HOLIDAYS	Servane Escoffier (FRA); Christophe Lebas (FRA)		

=== 2008 ===
Pos.	Sail No.	Boat name	Crew	Time	Ref.
1		SNEF et Cliptol Sport	Laurent Pellecuer (FRA); Jean-Paul Mouren (FRA)	22d 19h 13m 55s	
2		SOLAR INOX	Ronan Guerin (FRA); Luc Poupon (FRA)	22d 23h 45m 04s	
3		CONCARNEAU - ST BARTH	Eric Peron (FRA); Miguel Danet (FRA)	23d 00h 09m 26s	
4	FRA 4 (hull 12)	CERCLE VERT	Gildas Morvan (FRA); Jean Le Cam (FRA)	23d 01h 31m 45s	
5		BANQUE POPULAIRE	Jeanne Grégoire (FRA); Nicolas Lunven (FRA)	23d 03h 16m 18s	
6		SOPRA GROUP	Antoine Koch (FRA); Grégory Gendron (FRA)	23d 07h 53m 23s	
7		SOJASUN	Liz Wardley (PNG); Nick Black (GBR)	23d 09h 15m 21s	
8		LENZE	Franck Le Gal (FRA); Erwan Le Roux (FRA)	23d 10h 02m 20s	
9		SUZUKI Automobiles	Thierry Chabagny (FRA); Corentin Douguet (FRA)	23d 10h 05m 51s	
10		AXA Atout Coeur pour AIDES	Erik Nigon (FRA); Cédric Pouligny (FRA)	23d 10h 22m 14s	
11		SABLIERES PALVADEAU	Aymeric Belloir (FRA); Pierre Dombre (FRA)	23d 10h 23m 14s	
12		LES MOUSQUETAIRES	Bertrand De Broc (FRA); Gwenael Riou (FRA)	23d 23h 34m 59s	
13		FINANCO	Nicolas Troussel (FRA); Christopher Pratt (FRA)	24d 00h 11m 43s	
14		DEGREMONT SUEZ SOURCE DE TALENTS	Jean Charles Monnet (FRA); Alexandre Toulorge (FRA)	24d 00h 27m 39s	
15		TETRAKTYS	Pascal Desmarets (FRA); Bert Schandevyl (FRA)	24d 05h 00m 54s	
16		DEFI MOUSQUETAIRES	Thomas Rouxel (FRA); Erwan Israel (FRA)	24d 04h 43m 33s	
17		DEFI TRANSAT	Yannig Livory (FRA); Erwan Livory (FRA)	24d 05h 22m 05s	
18	FRA 9 (Hull 53)	GEDIMAT	Armel Tripon (FRA); Dominic Vittet (FRA)	24d 06h 53m 24s	
19	FRA 18	ATHEMA	Erwan Tabarly (FRA); Vincent Biarnes (FRA)	24d 11h 52m 11s	
20	FRA 57	AQUARELLE - LE FIGARO	Fabrice Amedeo (FRA); Jean Pierre Nicol (FRA)	24d 17h 26m 08s	
21		GROUPE CELEOS	Ronan Treussart (FRA); Anthony Marchand (FRA)	24d 18h 41m 48s	
22		KPMG	Elodie Riou (FRA); Bertrand Castelnerac (FRA)	24d 20h 37m 35s	
23	FRA 70	ATLANTIK FT	David Krizek (FRA); Phil Sharp (GBR)	24d 23h 23m 53s	
ABD		IROISE PROMOTIONS	Tangi Mahe (FRA); Claude Bertrac (FRA)		
ABD		LUISINA	Eric Drouglazet (FRA); Christophe Bouvet (FRA)		
ABD		NIVEA ATHLETES DU MONDE	Jean Galfione (FRA); Gilles Favennec (FRA)		

=== 2010 ===
Pos.	Sail No.	Boat name	Crew	Time	Ref.
1	FRA 1 (Hull 62)	BRIT AIR	Armel Le Cleac'h (FRA); Fabien Delahaye (FRA)	22d 16h 59m 11s	
2		BANQUE POPULAIRE	Jeanne Grégoire (FRA); Gérald Véniard (FRA)	22d 17h 49m 30s	
3	FRA 1 (hull 12)	CERCLE VERT	Gildas Morvan (FRA); Bertrand De Broc (FRA)	22d 19h 18m 11s	
4	FRA 97	SAVEOL	Romain Attanasio (FRA); Samantha Davies (GBR)	22d 19h 44m 22s	
5		CMB	Nicolas Troussel (FRA); Thomas Rouxel (FRA)	23d 00h 28m 38s	
6		GENERALI	Nicolas Lunven (FRA); Jean Le Cam (FRA)	23d 04h 19m 39s	
7		MACIF	Eric Peron (FRA); Gwenaël Riou (FRA)	23d 06h 05m 58s	
8	FRA 96 (3)	LUISINA	Eric Drouglazet (FRA); Laurent Pellecuer (FRA)	23d 06h 35m 14s	
9		LUFTHANSA	Ronan Treussart (FRA); Yannick Le Clech (FRA)	23d 07h 21m 38s	
10		CHEMINEES POUJOULAT	Bernard Stamm (FRA); Gildas Mahé (FRA)	23d 08h 33m 24s	
11		SAVE THE RICH	Christophe Bouvet (FRA); Yannick Bestaven (FRA)	23d 10h 24m 20s	
12		GEDIMAT	Armel Tripon (FRA); Franck Le Gal (FRA)	23d 10h 38m 10s	
13	FRA 36	KICKERS	Sébastien Picault (FRA); Laurent Bourgues (FRA)	23d 12h 20m 36s	
14		TRIER C'EST PRESERVER	Laurent Gouezigoux (FRA); Bertrand Delesne (FRA)	23d 14h 35m 07s	
15	FRA 9 (Hull 32)	AGIR RECOUVREMENT	Adrien Hardy (FRA); Stanislas Maslard (FRA)	23d 20h 30m 20s	
16		GASPE 7	Joseph Brault (FRA); Antoine Koch (FRA)	23d 20h 41m 07s	
17		GROUPE SNEF	Jean-Paul Mouren (FRA); Paul Meilhat (FRA)	23d 21h 28m 02s	
18		ISANTE	Christophe Rateau (FRA); Sylvain Pontu (FRA)	24d 03h 26m 57s	
19		Generali - Europ Assistance	Yann Eliès (FRA); Jérémie Beyou (FRA)	24d 05h 07m 24s	
20		GARMIN ONE NETWORK ENERGIES	Yannig Livory (FRA); Erwan Livory (FRA)	24d 05h 14m 10s	
21	FRA 99 (9)	MAISONS de L'AVENIR	Henri-Paul Schipman (FRA); Pierre Canevet (FRA)	24d 09h 16m 20s	
22		CONCARNEAU ST BARTH	Miguel Danet (FRA); Damien Cloarec (FRA)	24d 18h 06m 59s	
23	FRA 57	BCOMBIO	Luce Molinier (FRA); Bertrand Castelnerac (FRA)	24d 19h 53m 06s	
24		GROUPE BEL	Christophe De Pavant (FRA); Sébastien Audigane (FRA)	26d 02h 57m 38s	
25		MEMOIRESTBARTH.COM	Richard Ledee (FRA); Christophe Lebas (FRA)	26d 02h 57m 39s	

=== 2012 ===
Pos.	Sail No.	Boat name	Crew	Time	Ref.
1	FRA (hull 12)	GREEN CIRCLE	Gildas Morvan (FRA); Charlie Dalin (FRA)	22d 08h 55m 45s	
2	FRA 2 (hull 18)	Nacarat	Erwan Tabarly (FRA); Eric Peron (FRA)	22d 10h 10m 08s	
3		PEOPLE'S BANK	Jeanne Grégoire (FRA); Gérald Véniard (FRA)	22d 11h 37m 24s	
4		SKIPPER MACIF	Paul Meilhat (FRA); Fabien Delahaye (FRA)	22d 11h 39m 01s	
5		BRITTANY CREDIT MUTUEL PERFORMANCE	Anthony Marchand (FRA); Romain Attanasio (FRA)	22d 12h 42m 15s	
6	FRA (Hull 53)	GEDIMAT	Thierry Chabagny (FRA); Christopher Pratt (FRA)	22d 13h 01m 16s	
7		SEPALUMIC	Frédéric Duthil (FRA); François Lebourdais (FRA)	22d 14h 09m 07s	
8		EDM / BASQUE COUNTRY ENTERPRISES	Amaiur Alfaro (FRA); Christophe Lebas (FRA)	22d 14h 33m 35s	
9		THE BRETON RECYCLERS	Michel Bothuon (FRA); Simon Troel (FRA)	22d 14h 42m 22s	
10		CORNWALL PORT OF PEACH	Jean-Charles Monnet (FRA); Alexandre Toulorge (FRA)	22d 14h 43m 21s	
11		GAES	Anna Corbella (ESP); Gérard Marin (ESP)	22d 14h 57m 56s	
12	23	Artemis	Sam Goodchild (GBR); Nick Cherry (GBR)	22d 15h 59m 26s	
13		MUTUAL SOLIDARITY	Damien Guillou (FRA); Ronan Treussart (FRA)	22d 17h 26m 39s	
14		ONE NETWORK ENERGIES	Yannig Livory (FRA); Guillaume Farsy (FRA)	22d 22h 27m 28s	
15	FRA 57	ARMOR - LUX / PERE LOUSTIC / CLOWN AT THE HOSPITAL	Germain Kerleveo (FRA); Jean-Sebastien Henry (FRA)	23d 10h 54m 34s	
16		HOTEL EMERALD BEACH SAINT-BARTHELEMY	Louis-Maurice Tannyères (FRA); Joanna Tannyères (FRA)	24d 04h 27m 49s	

=== 2014 ===
Pos.	Sail No.	Boat name	Crew	Time	Ref.
1		SAFRAN - GUY COTTEN	Gwenolé Gahinet (FRA); Paul Meilhat (FRA)	22d 06h 17m 59s	
2		SKIPPER MACIF	Fabien Delahaye (FRA); Yoann Richomme (FRA)	22d 07h 24m 52s	
3		30 CORSAIRES	Alexia Barrier (FRA); Laurent Pellecuer (FRA)	22d 07h 54m 56s	
4		LA CORNOUAILLE	Roland Jourdain (FRA); Martin Le Pape (FRA)	22d 07h 56m 23s	
5		GENERALI	Nicolas Lunven (FRA); Eric Peron (FRA)	22d 12h 21m 57s	
6		SCUTUM	Gérald Veniard (FRA); Jeanne Grégoire (FRA)	22d 17h 08m 37s	
7		ENTREPRENDRE EN CORNOUAILLE	Simon Troel (FRA); Ronan Treussart (FRA)	22d 18h 37m 55s	
8		LORIENTREPRENDRE	Yannig Livory (FRA); Guillaume Farsy (FRA)	23d 17h 54m 37s	
9		GUADELOUPE GRAND LARGE 2	Nicolas Thomas (FRA); François Guibourdin (FRA)	23d 18h 12m 07s	
10		BRETAGNE - CREDIT MUTUEL PERFORMANCE	Corentin Horeau (FRA); Michel Desjoyeaux (FRA)	23d 23h 31m 26s	
11		INTERFACE CONCEPT	Jean Le Cam (FRA); Gildas Mahé (FRA)	23d 23h 34m 20s	
12		MADE IN MIDI	Gwenael Gbick (FRA); Christophe De Pavant (FRA)	24d 00h 9m 37s	
13		GUADELOUPE GRAND LARGE 1	Mathieu Forbin (FRA); Arthur Prat (FRA)	25d 13h 33m 29s	
ABD		CERCLE VERT	Gildas Morvan (FRA); Charlie Dalin (FRA)		
ABD		GEDIMAT	Thierry Chabagny (FRA); Erwan Tabarly (FRA)		

=== 2016 ===
Pos.	Sail No.	Boat name	Crew	Time	Ref.
1		GEDIMAT	Thierry Chabagny (FRA); Erwan Tabarly (FRA)	22d 01h 06m 53s	
2		GENERALI	Nicolas Lunven (FRA); Gildas Mahé (FRA)	22d 01h 10m 57s	
3		AGIR RECOUVREMENT	Adrien Hardy (FRA); Vincent Biarnes (FRA)	22d 01h 35m 41s	
4		BRETAGNE - CMB PERFORMANCE	Sébastien Simon (FRA); Xavier Macaire (FRA)	22d 01h 47m 52s	
5		CERCLE VERT	Gildas Morvan (FRA); Alexis Loison (FRA)	22d 01h 50m 55s	
6		ARTEMIS	Sam Matson (FRA); Robin Elsey (FRA)	22d 04h 15m 53s	
7	FRA 62	BELLOCQ PAYSAGES - SAVEURS DE CORNOUAILLE	Martin Le Pape (FRA); Eric Péron (FRA)	22d 05h 39m 11s	
8	FRA 97	FULGUR - EVAPCO	Milan Kolacek (CZE); Pierre Brasseur (FRA)	22d 06h 51m 27s	
9		LES SAINTES	Arthur Prat (FRA); Nicolas Thomas (FRA)	23d 05h 49m 39s	
10		MARIE GALANTE	Keni Piperol (FRA); Benjamin Augereau (FRA)	24d 13h 44m 24s	
11		GUADELOUPE	Arthur Bouwyn (FRA); Alienor Fleury (FRA)	24d 21h 46m 58s	
12	FRA 32	CUISINES IXINA	Tanguy Le Turquais (FRA); Hervé Aubry (FRA)	26d 06h 23m 57s	
13		LORIENTREPRENDRE	Yannig Livory (FRA); Erwan Livory (FRA)	27d 17h 50m 00s	
14		FREE DOM Services à domicile	Tolga Ekrem Pamir (FRA); Stéphanie Jadaud (FRA)	27d 29h 40m 00s	
ABD		SKIPPER MACIF	Charlie Dalin (FRA); Yoann Richomme (FRA)		

=== 2018 ===
Pos.	Sail No.	Boat name	Crew	Time	Ref.
1	FRA 32	AGIR Recouvrement	Adrien Hardy (FRA); Thomas Ruyant (FRA)	18d 11h 48m 22s	
2		BRETAGNE - CMB PERFORMANCE	Sébastien Simon (FRA); Morgan Lagravière (FRA)	18d 12h 57m 40s	
3		Breizh cola	Gildas Mahé (FRA); Nicolas Troussel (FRA)	18d 15h 36m 40s	
4	FRA 62	Guyot environnement	Pierre Leboucher (FRA); Christopher Pratt (FRA)	18d 15h 50m 55s	
5		GROUPE ROYER - SECOURS POPULAIRE	Anthony Marchand (FRA); Alexis Loison (FRA)	18d 17h 52m 00s	
6		NF HABITAT	Corentin Douguet (FRA); Christian Ponthieu (FRA)	18d 18h 43m 22s	
7		Armor lux - Gedimat	Erwan Tabarly (FRA); Thierry Chabagny (FRA)	18d 20h 30m 15s	
8		LE MACARON FRENCH PASTRIES	Eric Péron (FRA); Miguel Danet (FRA)	19d 00h 12m 25s	
9		Les perles de St Barth	Ronan Treussart (FRA); Simon Troel (FRA)	19d 05h 34m 03s	
10		Teamwork.net	Justine Mettraux (FRA); Isabelle Joschke (FRA)	19d 06h 53m 02s	
11		SMURFIT KAPPA - CERFRANCE	Thomas Dolan (IRL); Tanguy Bouroullec (FRA)	19d 09h 5m 10s	
12		CONCARNEAU ENTREPRENDRE	Loïs Berrehar (FRA); Erwan Le Draoulec (FRA)	19d 09h 50m 35s	
13		BRETAGNE - CMB ESPOIR	Pierre Rhimbault (FRA); Romain Attanasio (FRA)	19d 09h 52m 20s	
14		Everial	Tanguy Le Turquais (FRA); Clarisse Cremer (FRA)	19d 15h 51m 04s	
15	FRA 14	Les Frigos Solidaires	Mathieu Claveau (FRA); Pierre Loulier (FRA)	21d 09h 03m 20s	
16		CORNOUAILLE-SOLIDARITE ST BARTH	Guillaume Farsy (FRA); Renaud Nicot (FRA)	23d 5h 29m 00s	
ABD		MACIF	Martin Le Pape (FRA); Yoann Richomme (FRA)		
ABD		SAFERAIL	Damien Cloarec (FRA); Damien Guillou (FRA)		
ABD		Sateco-Team Vendée formation	Benjamin Dutreux (FRA); Frédéric Denis (FRA)		

=== 2021 - La Transat en Double ===
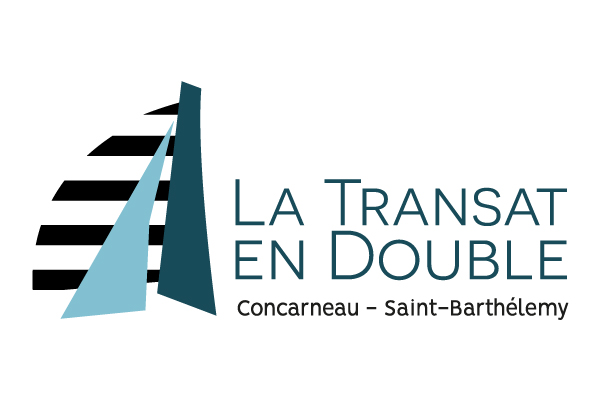

This was the first edition to use the new Beneteau Figaro 3 and was delayed by 12 months from 2020 to 2021 due to the COVID-19 pandemic. The race was renamed to "Transat en Double - Concarneau - Saint-Barthélemy".

Pos.	Sail No.	Boat name	Crew	Time	Ref.
1	SUI 21	TeamWork	Nils Palmieri (SUI); Julien Villion (FRA)	18d 05h 08m 03s	
2	FRA 39	Queguiner - Innovéo	Tanguy Le Turquais (FRA); Corentin Douguet (FRA)	18d 06h 50m 01s	
3	FRA 27	Bretagne - CMB Performance	Tom Laperche (FRA); Loïs Berrehar (FRA)	18d 07h 11m 06s	
4	FRA 31	GUYOT environnement - Ruban Rose	Pierre Leboucher (FRA); Thomas Rouxel (FRA)	18d 7h 31m 12s	
5	FRA 36	Région Normandie	Alexis Loison (FRA); Guillaume Pirouelle (FRA)	18d 07h 34m 16s	
6	FRA 55	(L’Égoïste) - Cantina St Barth	Éric Péron (FRA); Miguel Danet (FRA)	18d 07h 50m 33s	
7	FRA 47	Bretagne - CMB Océane	Elodie Bonafous (FRA); Corentin Horeau (FRA)	18d 07h 58m 55s	
8	FRA 44	Breizh Cola	Gildas Mahé (FRA); Thomas Dolan (IRL)	18d 08h 18m 46s	
9	FRA 29	Devenir	Violette Dorange (FRA); Alan Roberts (GBR)	18d 08h 58m 26s	
10	FRA 06	Gardons la vue	Martin Le Pape (FRA); Yann Eliès (FRA)	18d 09h 35m 20s	
11	FRA 37	Skipper Macif	Pierre Quiroga (FRA); Erwan Le Draoulec (FRA)	18d 09h 36m 17s	
12	FRA 07	MonAtoutEnergie.fr	Arthur Hubert (FRA); Clément Commagnac (FRA)	18d 09h 57m 07s	
13	ESP 25	Cybèle Vacances - Team Play to B	Pep Costa (ESP); Will Harris (Sailor) (GBR)	18d 11h 24m 36s	
14	FRA 34	Groupe Gilbert	Fabien Delahaye (FRA); Anthony Marchand (FRA)	18d 12h 10m 12s	
15	FRA 40	RLC Sailing	Estelle Greck (FRA); Laurent Givry (FRA)	18d 23h 38m 59s	
16		Erisma - Groupe SODES - Fondation Tara Océan	Jérôme Samuel (FRA); Nicolas Salet (FRA)	20d 15h 50m 10s	
17	FRA 65	Interaction	Yannig Livory (FRA); Erwan Livory (FRA)	22d 01h 35m 18s	
18	FRA 56	Kriss-Laure	Nicolas Bertho (FRA); Romuald Poirat (FRA)	22d 09h 18m 16s	

=== 2023 - Transat Paprec ===
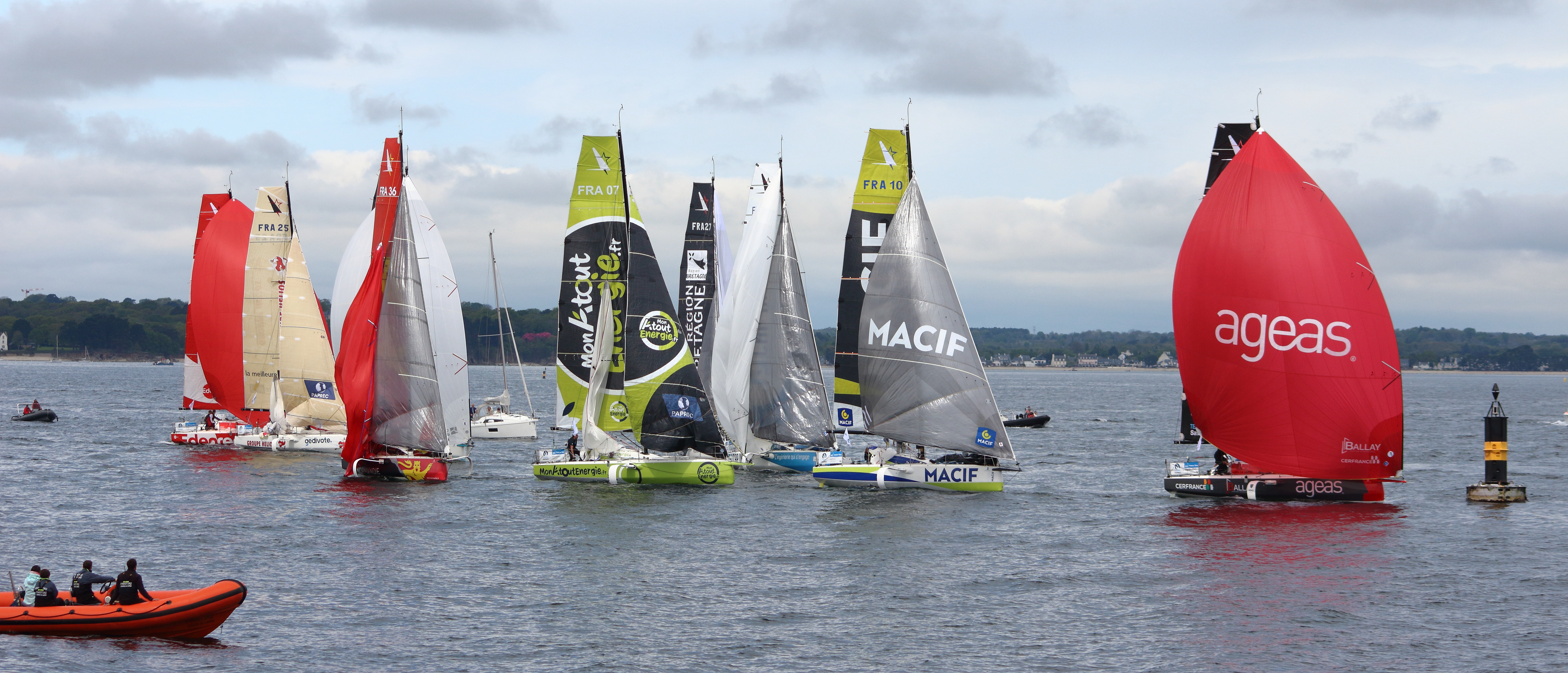
uprgight

From 2023, the Paprec recycling company becomes the main sponsor of the race, which officially takes its name.

Pos.	Sail No.	Boat name	Crew	Time	Ref.
1	FRA 10	MACIF	Lois Berrehar (FRA); Charlotte Yven (FRA)	18d 19h 01m 33s	
2	FRA 27	Région Bretagne - CMB Performance	Gaston Morvan (FRA); Anne-Claire Le Berre (FRA)	18d 19h 18m 06s	
3	FRA 15	MUTUELLE BLEUE	Corentin Horeau (FRA); Pauline Courtois (FRA)	18d 20h 00m 30s	
4	FRA 36	Region Normandie	Guillaume Pirouelle (FRA); Sophie Faguet (FRA)	18d 22h 22m 10s	
5	FRA 55	CAP INGÉLEC	Camille Bertel (FRA); Pierre Leboucher (FRA)	18d 23h 06m 10s	
6	FRA 47	MUTUELLE BLEUE	Chloe Le Bars (FRA); Hugo Dhallenne (FRA)	18d 23h 59m 54s	
7	FRA 14	Ageas – Ballay – Cerfrance – Baie de Saint-Brieuc	Maël Garnier (FRA); Julia Courtois (FRA)	19d 00h 58m 58s	
8	FRA 56	EdenRed	Basile Bourgnon (FRA); Violette Dorange (FRA)	19d 05h 04m 34s	
9	FRA 07	MonAtoutÉnergie.fr	Arthur Hubert (FRA); Colomber Julia (FRA)	19d 10h 33m 45s	
10	FRA 59	Race for Science - Verder	Alicia De Pfyffer (SUI); Edouard Golbery (FRA)	20d 07h 40m 05s	
11	FRA 25	Groupe Hélios - Du Léman à l'Océan	Arnaud Machado (FRA); Lucie Queruel (FRA)	20d 10h 47m 15s	

=== 2025 - Transat Paprec ===
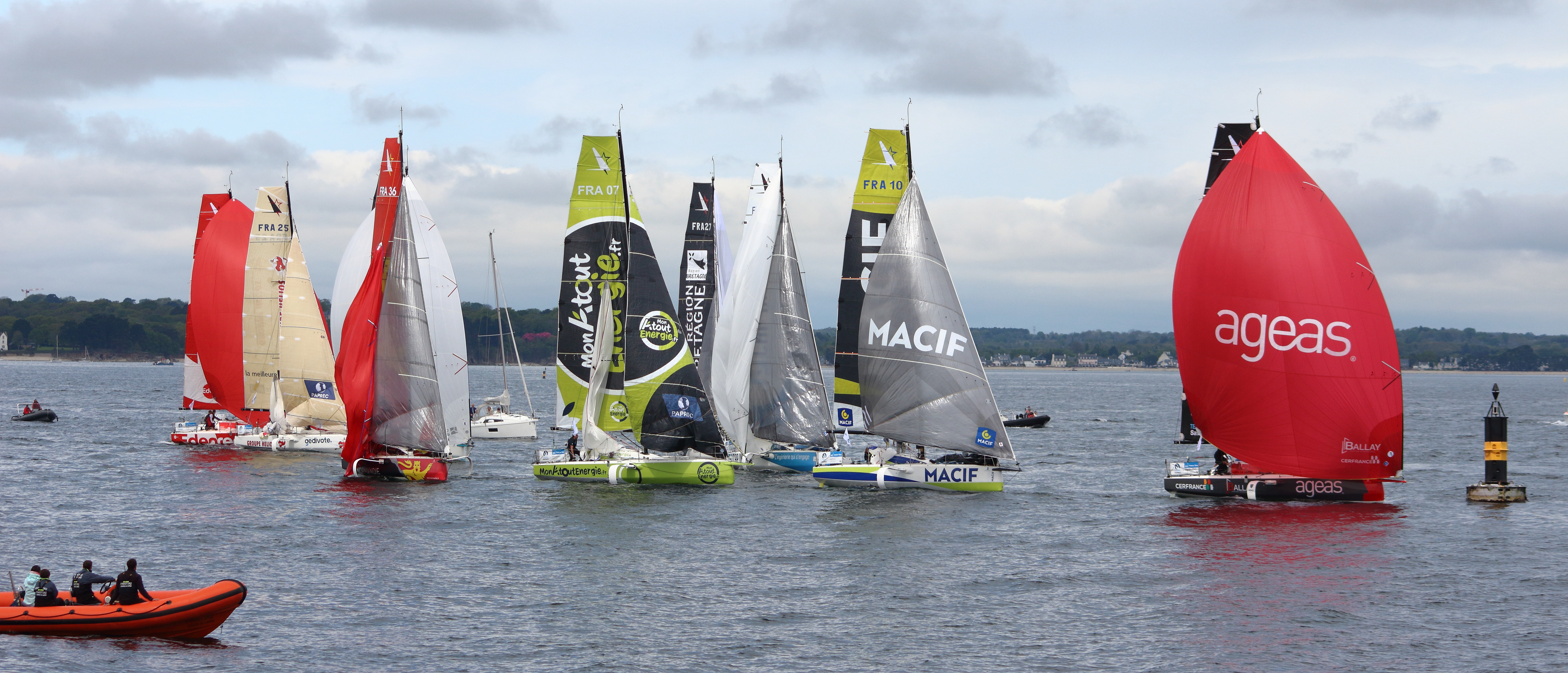
uprgight

Pos.	Sail No.	Boat name	Crew	Time	Delta	Nm	Ref.
1		MACIF	Charlotte Yven (FRA); Yven Dhallenne (FRA)	18d 19h 16m 54s	-	4270	
2		DECROCHONS LA LUNE	Romain Bouillard (FRA); Irina Gracheva (FRA)	18d 19h 59m 35s	00h 42m 41s	4261.7	
3		Cap St Barth	Cindy Brin (FRA); Thomas Andre (FRA)	18d 20h 02m 21s	00h 45m 27s	4319.34	
4		Selencia - Cerfrance	Mael Garnier (FRA); Catherine Hunt (GBR)	18d 20h 02m 56s	00h 46m 02s	4258.2	
5		Tomorrow	Martin Le Pape (FRA); Mathilde Geron (FRA)	18d 20h 12m 35s	00h 55m 41s	4151.6	
6		Hellowork	Davy Beaudart (FRA); Julie Simon (FRA)	18d 20h 25m 22s	01h 08m 28s	4380	
7		DMG MORI Academy	Laure Galley (FRA); Kevin Bloch (FRA)	18d 20h 26m 17s	01h 09m 23s	4274	
8		Les Étoiles Filantes	Quentin Vlamynck (FRA); Audrey Ogereau (FRA)	18d 20h 39m 49s	01h 22m 55s	4304	
9		Wings of the Ocean	Alexis Thomas (FRA); Pauline Courtois (FRA)	18d 21h 02m 28s	01h 45m 34s	4283	
10		Région Bretagne – CMB Océane	Lola Billy (FRA); Corentin Horeau (FRA)	18d 21h 09m 24s	01h 52m 30s	4300	
11		Faun	Adrien Simon (FRA); Chloe Le Bars (FRA)	18d 21h 30m 55s	02h 14m 01s	4274	
12		Almond for Pure Ocean	Thomas De Dinechin (FRA); Aglae Ribon (FRA)	18d 22h 09m 12s	02h 52m 18s	4304	
13		Région Bretagne – CMB Espoir	Victor Le Pape (FRA); Estelle Greck (FRA)	18d 21h 44m 40s	02h 27m 46s	4283	
14		Humains en Action	Anaelle Pattusch (FRA); Hugo Cardon (FRA)	19d 00h 58m 11s	05h 41m 17s	4274	
15		Solan Ocean Racing	Maggie Adamson (IRL); Calanach Finlayson (IRL)	19d 03h 43m 02s	08h 26m 08s	4304	
16		Banques Alimentaires	Pier-Paolo Dean (FRA); Tiphaine Rideau (FRA)	19d 04h 26m 04s	09h 09m 10s	4283	
17	GBR 59	Women's Engineering Society	Ellie Driver (GBR); Oliver Hill (GBR)	19d 16h 41m 23s	21h 24m 29s	4300	
DNF		Région Normandie	Jules Ducelier (FRA); Sophie Faguet (FRA)	Retired Unaided due to Sail Damaged			
DNF		Article.1	Arno Biston (FRA); Vittoria Ripa Di Meana (FRA)	Retired Unaided due to Sail Damaged			
