= Bertrand de Broc =

French offshore sailor and navigator

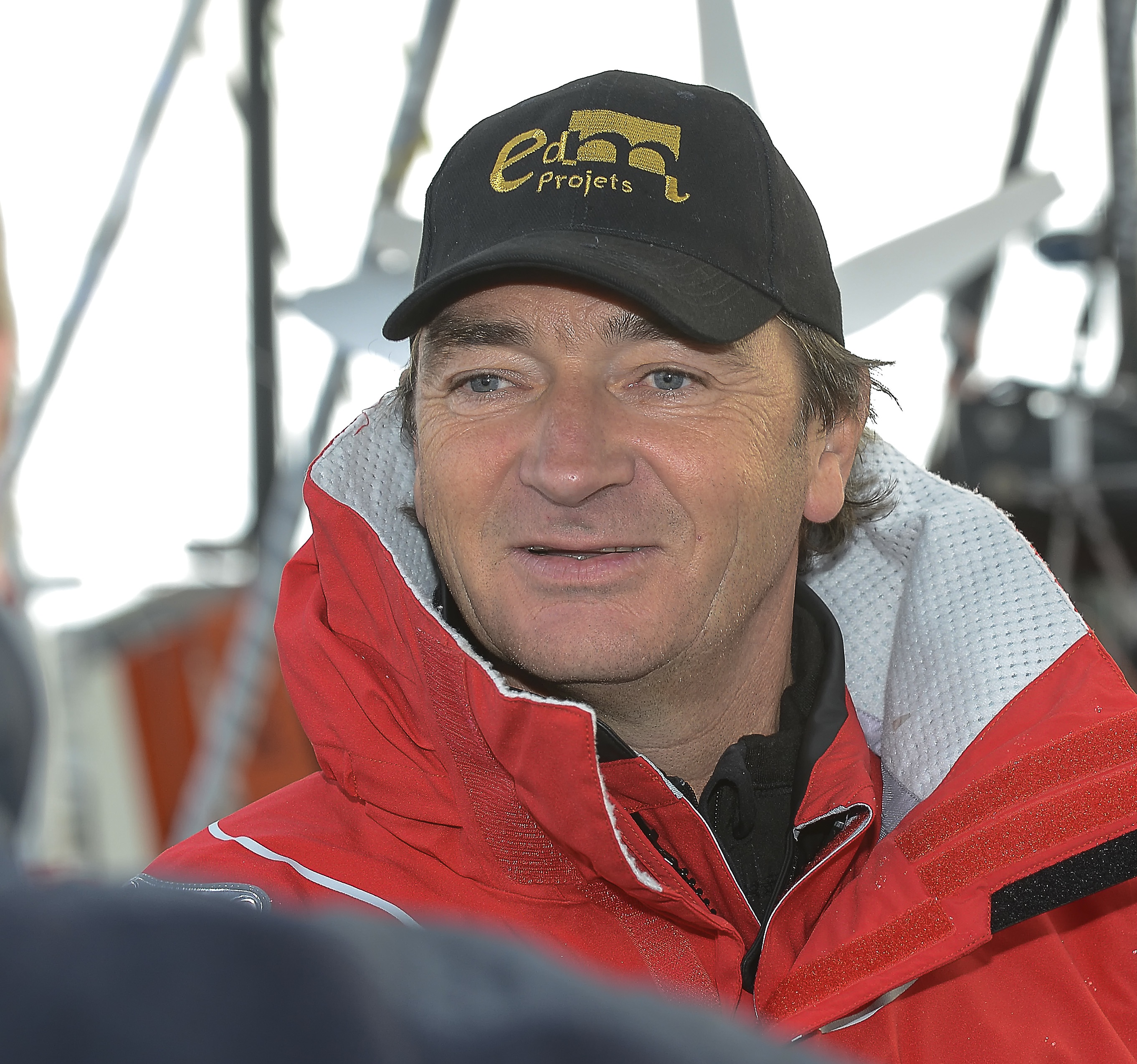

Personal information
- Born: 23 September 1960 (age 65) Quimper, France

Sailing career
- Sport: Sailing

Bertrand de Broc (born 23 September 1960) is a French professional sailor. He has long resided in Combrit in the Finistère. He has competed in four Vendee Globe's completing the 2012-2013 Vendée Globe in 9th place.

== Personal life ==
Bertrand de Broc has a son, born in 1996, who practices windsurfing. He is also a cousin with fellow offshore sailor Marc Guillemot.

== Incidents at sea ==
- 1992-1993 Vendée Globe: abandoned in New Zealand due to structural problem of his keel, while he is in third position. During this solo race, he had to sew his tongue.
- 1996-1997 Vendée Globe: capsizing three hundred miles from the finish, in the Bay of Biscay, while he was out of the race following a stop in Ushuaia to solve technical problems.
- 2002 Route du Rhum: abandonment off Brest, decision to stop solo sailing on trimaran following not feeling comfortable with two competitors capsizing.
- 2012-2013 Vendée Globe: When leaving port, a collision with a boat accompanying his team causes a waterway. He is forced to turn around to repair a few minutes before departure. He left the following night and finished 9th in this race.
- 2016-2017 Vendée Globe: Retires following a collision following a hull inspection.

== Sailing highlights ==
Year	Pos	Event name	Class	Boat name	Notes	Ref
Round the World Races
2016	RET	2016-2017 Vendée Globe	IMOCA 60	MACSF	Day 14: Damaged keel - South Atlantic near Fernando de Noronha	
2013	9	2012-2013 Vendée Globe	IMOCA 60	Votre Nom autour du Monde avec EDM Projets	Elapsed 92d 05h 10' 14"; Corrected 92d 17h 10' 14"	
1997	RET	1996-1997 Vendée Globe	IMOCA 60	Votre Nom autour du Monde: Pommes Rhône Alpes	capsized	
Transatlantic Races
2018	10	2018 Route du Rhum	catamaran TS 52.8	Pampéro Evasion		
2015	6	2015 Transat Jacques Vabre	IMOCA 60		with Marc Guillemot	
2013	6	2013 Transat Jacques-Vabre	IMOCA 60		with Arnaud Boissières	
2010	3	Transat AG2R	Beneteau Figaro 2	Green Circle	with Gildas Morvan	
2005	3	Transat Jacques Vabre	IMOCA 60			
2000	2	Transat AG2R				
1994	2	Transat AG2R		La dairies Le Gall	with Marc Guillemot	
1981	1	Transat doubles				
Other Races
2007	6	BPE Trophy				
2004	20	Solitaire du Figaro				
2004	1	Tour de France à la voile	Farr 30			
2003	1	BPE Trophy				
2000	15	Solitaire du Figaro				
1999	26	Solitaire du Figaro				
1998	9	Solitaire du Figaro				
1998	1	Tour de France à la voile	JOD 35			
1991	21	Solitaire du Figaro				
1990	5	Solitaire du Figaro				
1989	6	Solitaire du Figaro				
1988	5	Solitaire du Figaro				
1984	10	Solitaire du Figaro				
1982	28	Solitaire du Figaro				
1979	9	Solitaire du Figaro				

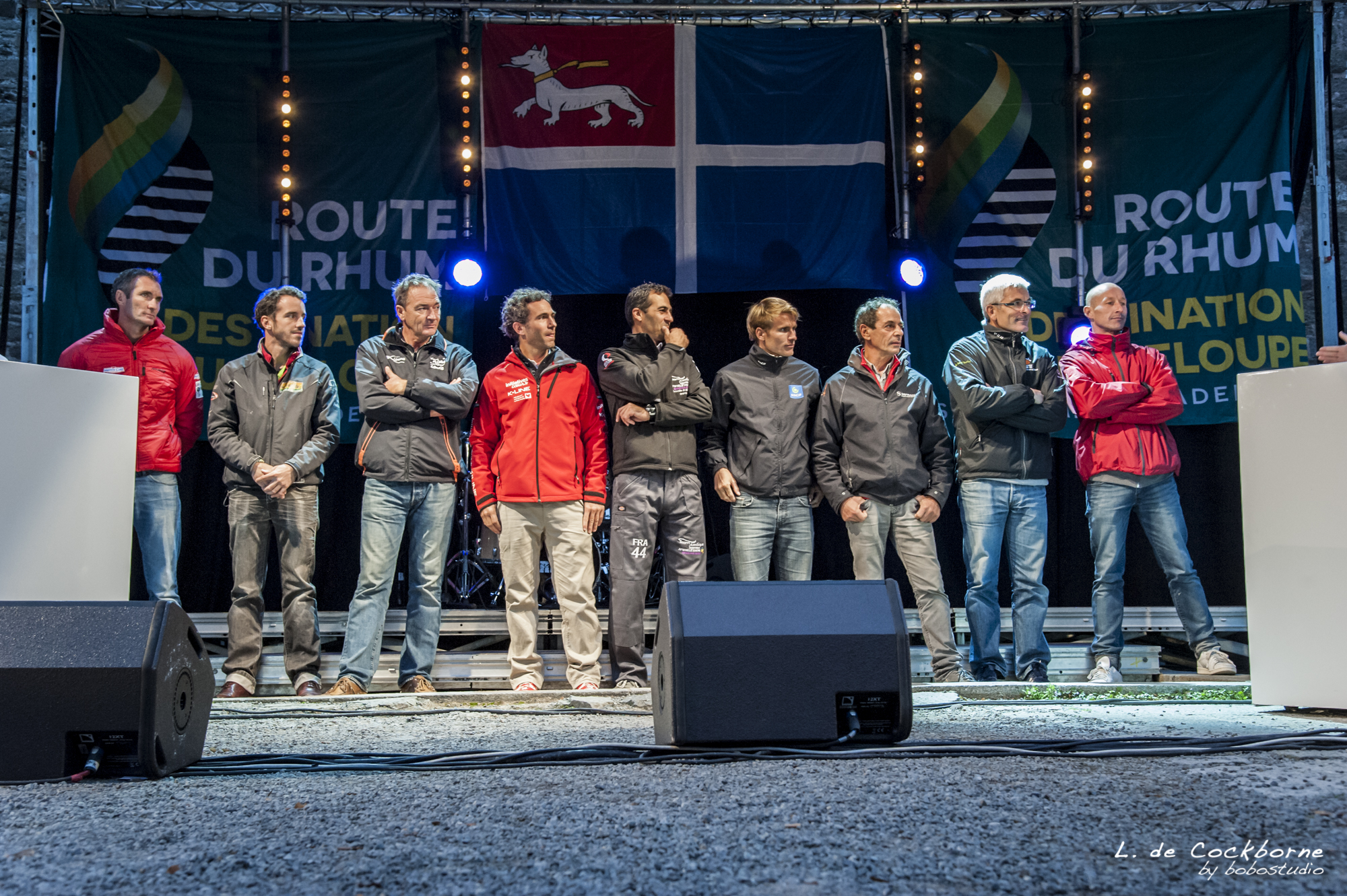

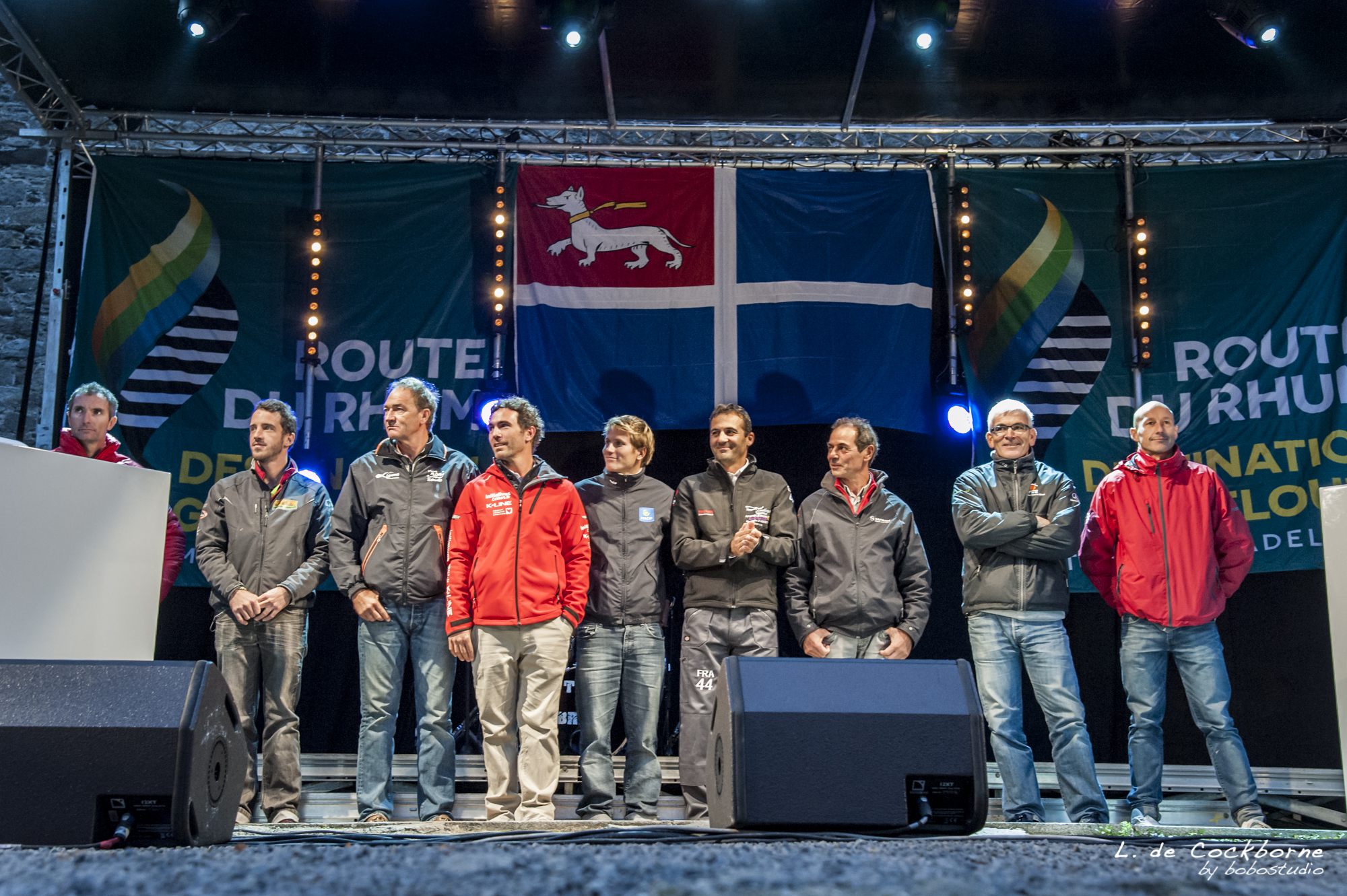

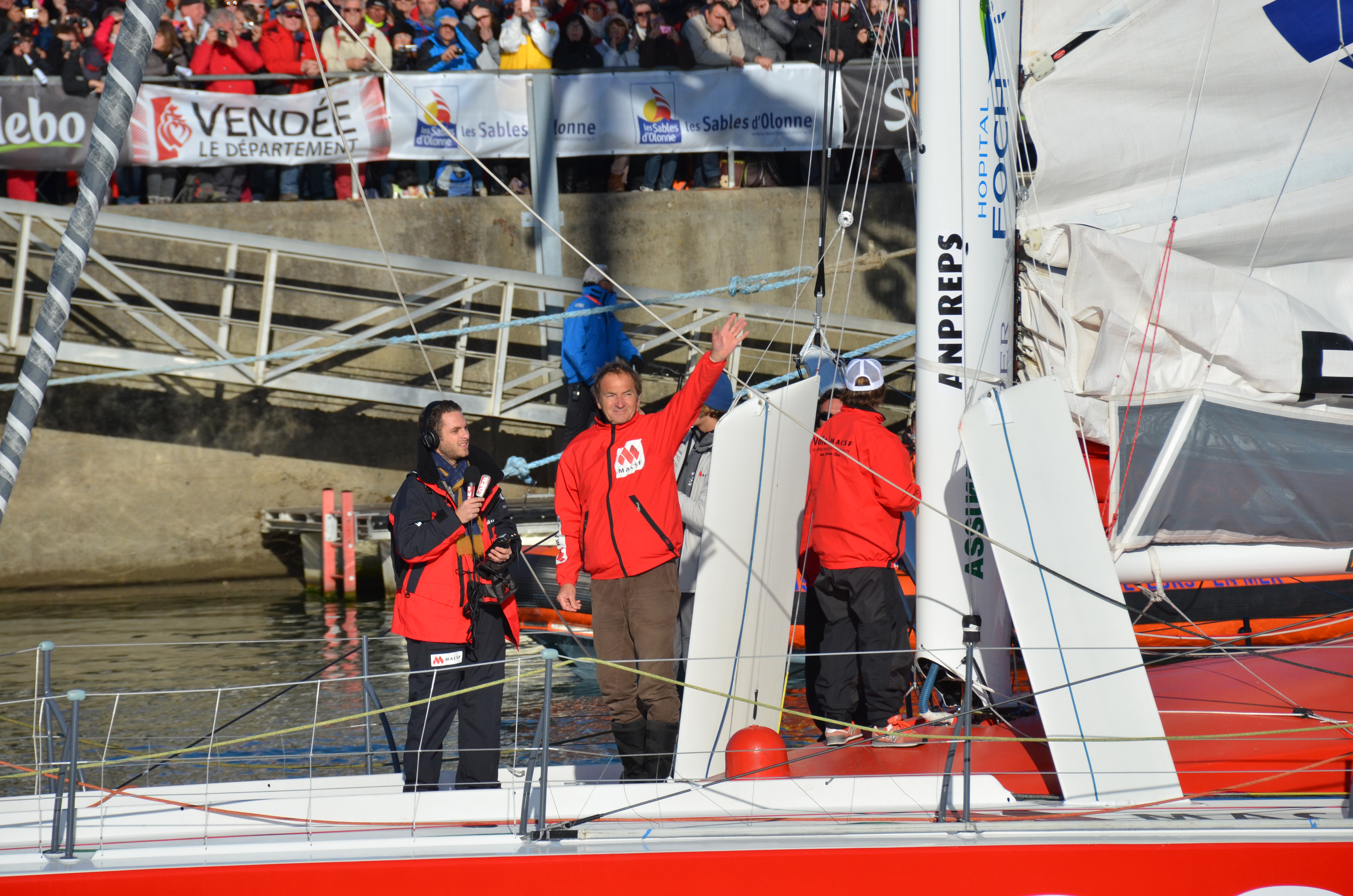

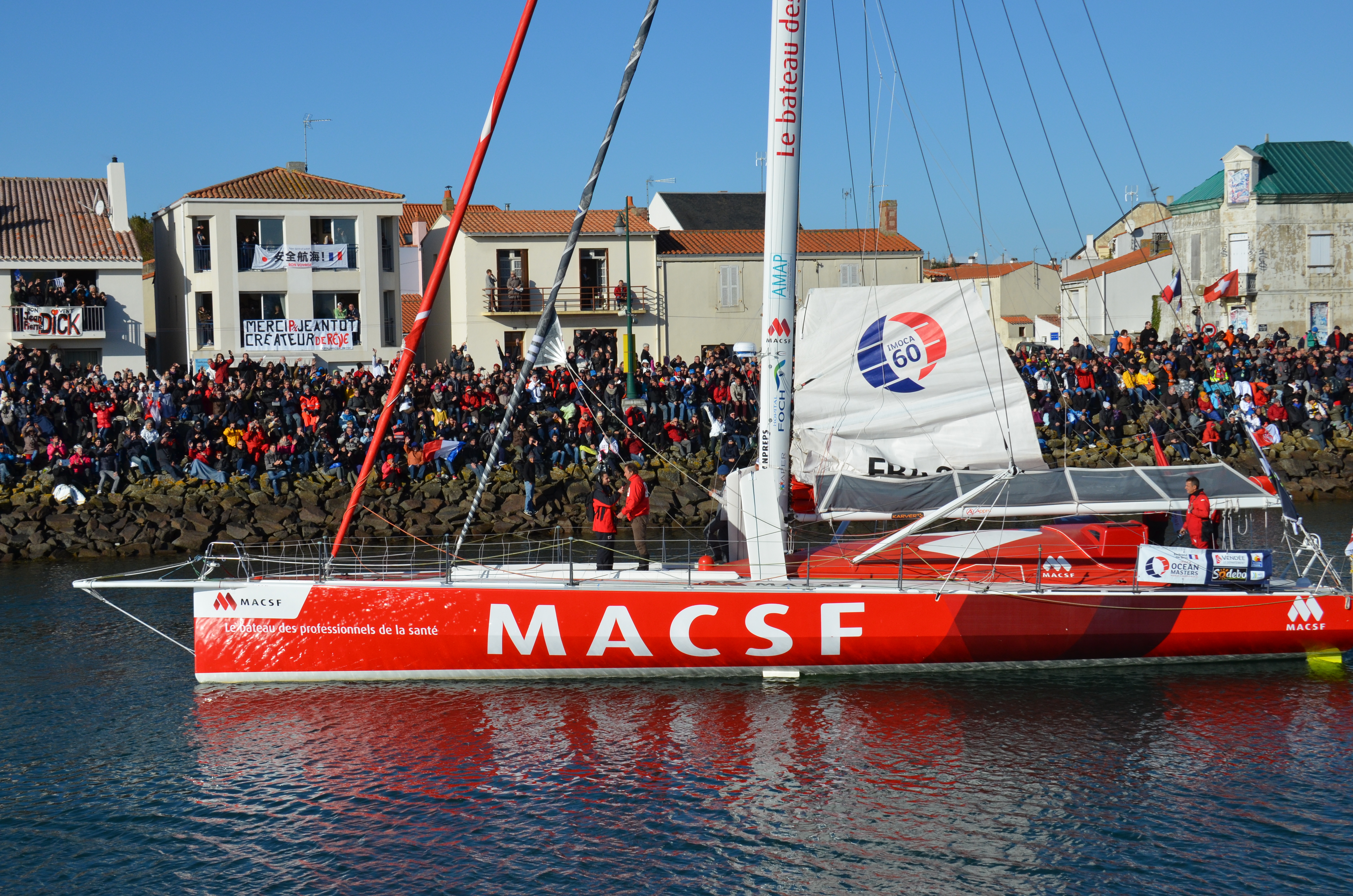

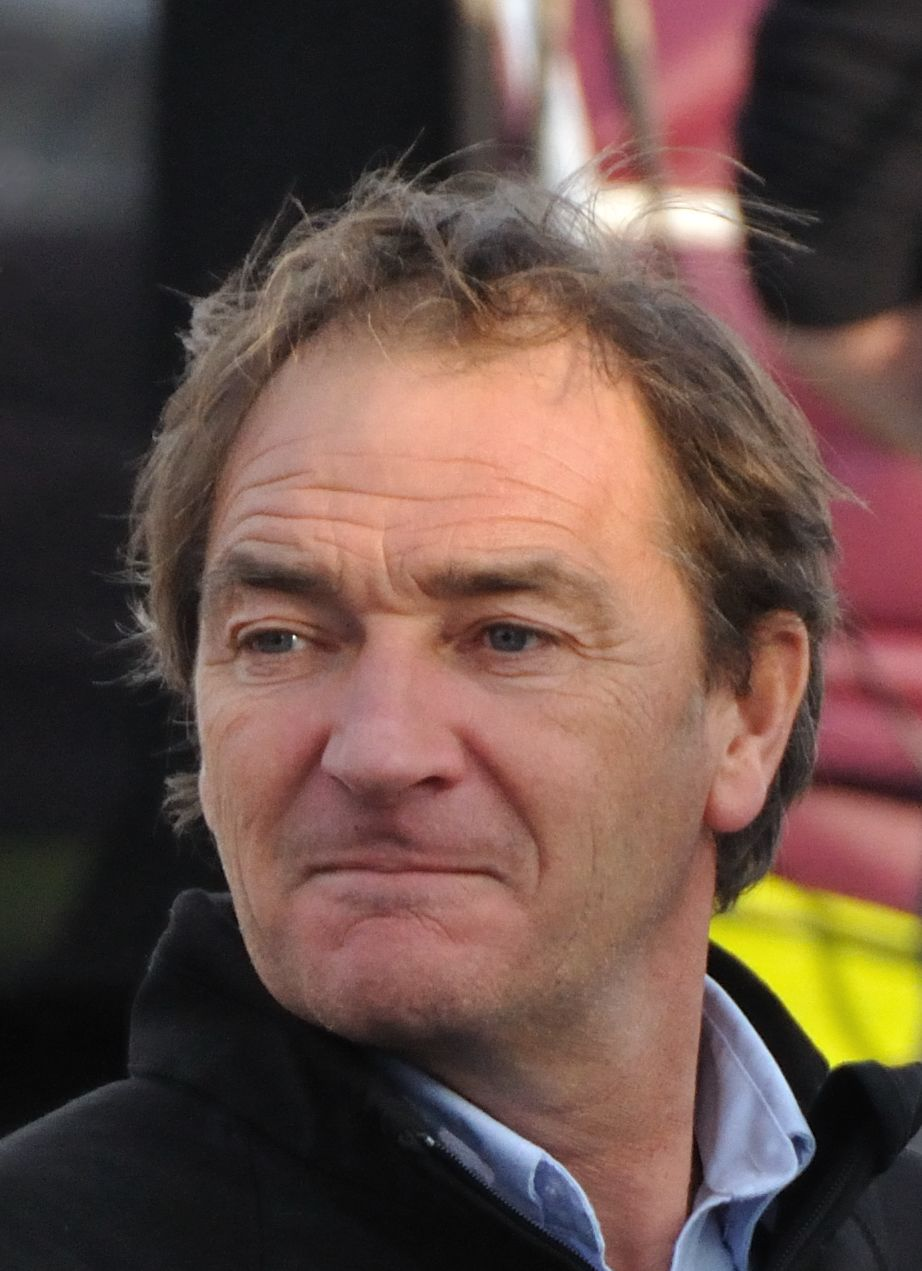

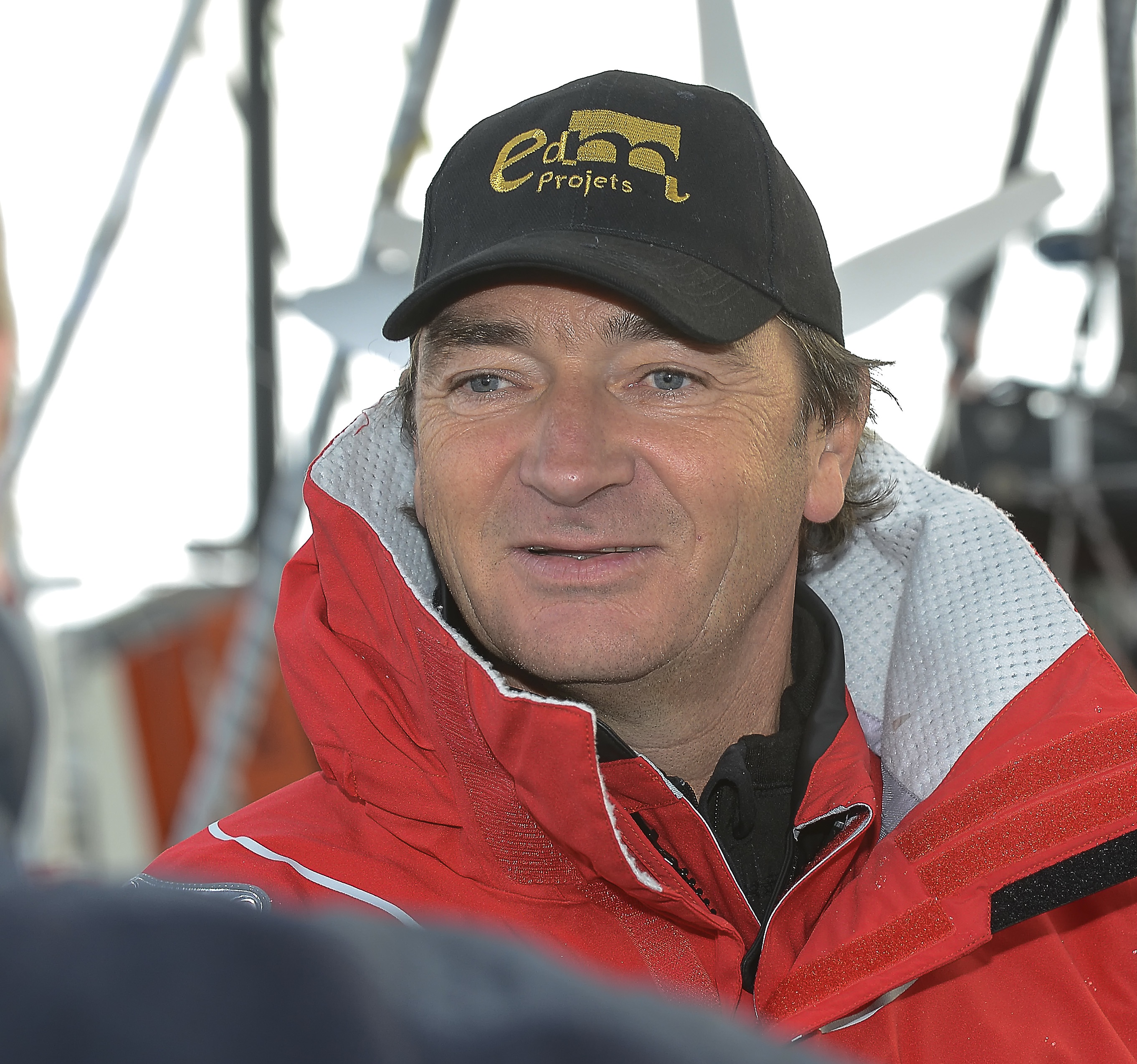

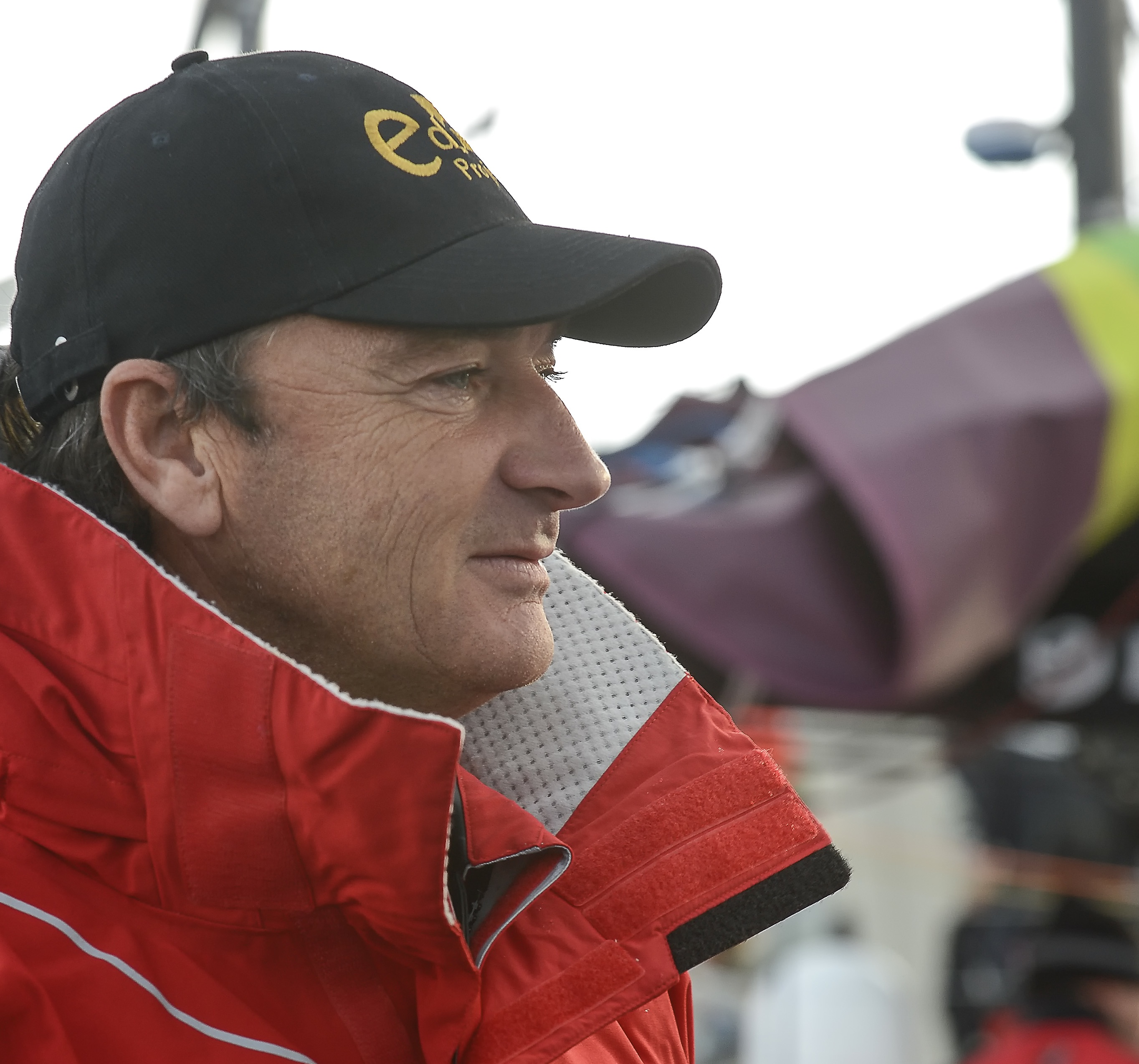

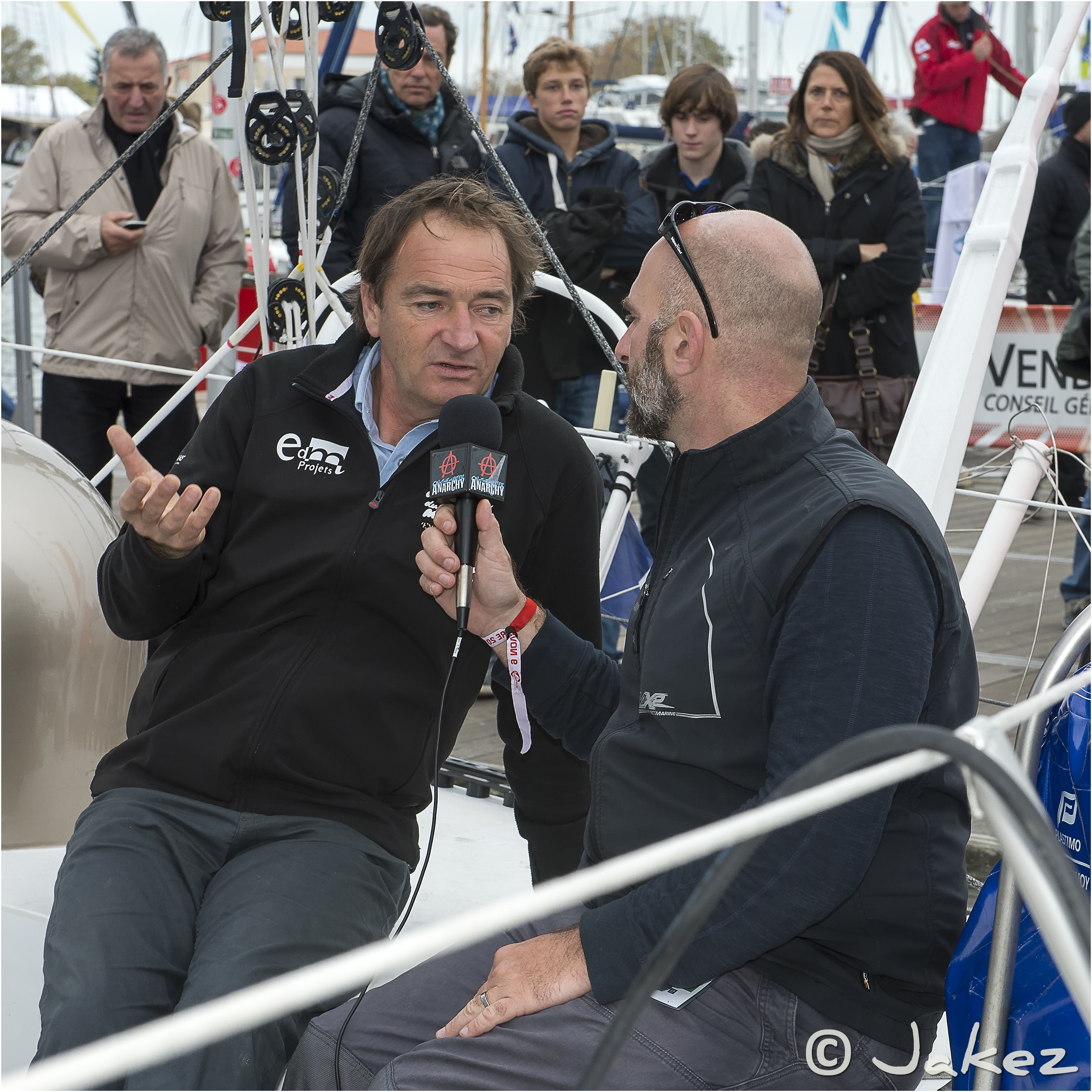

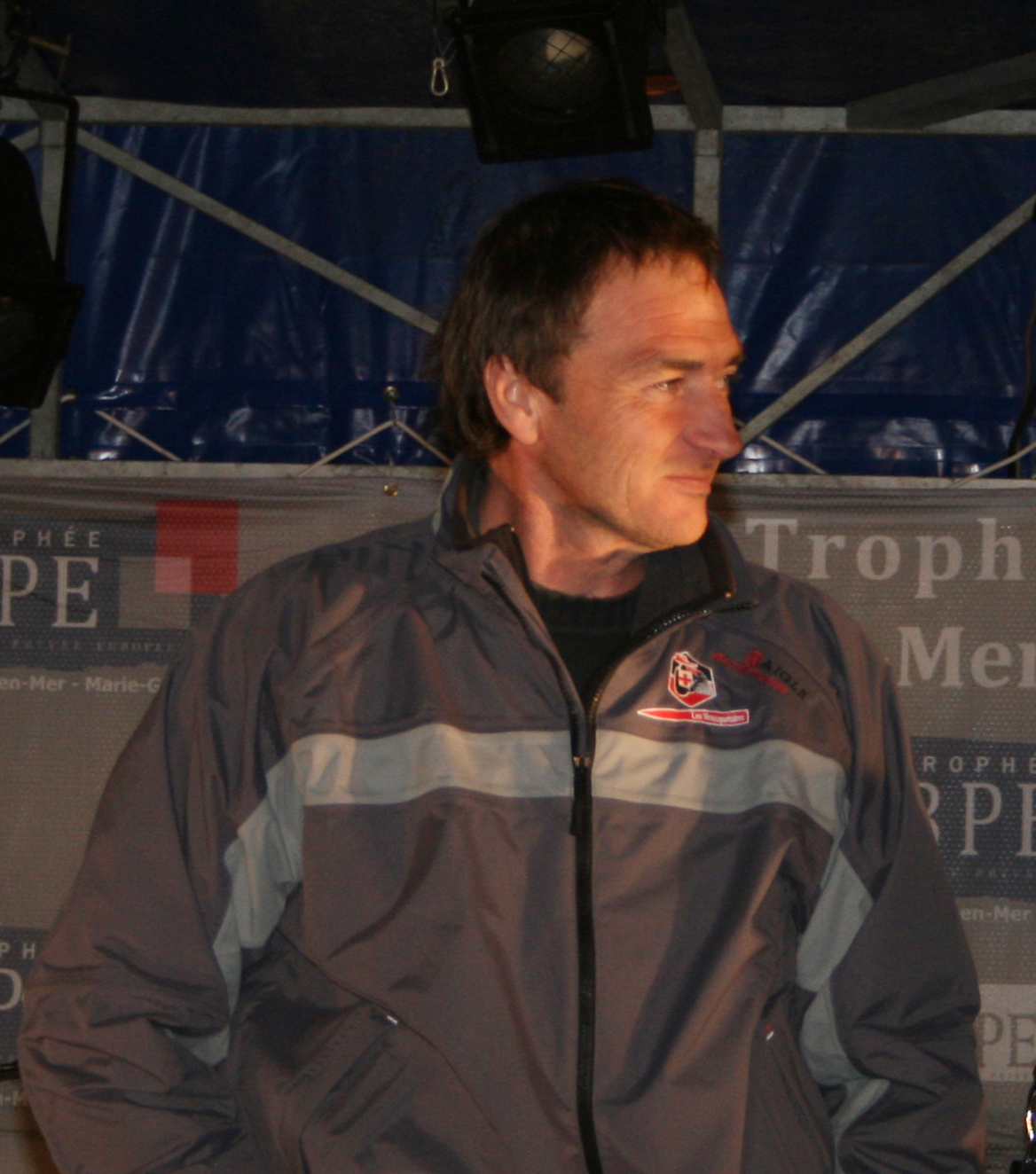

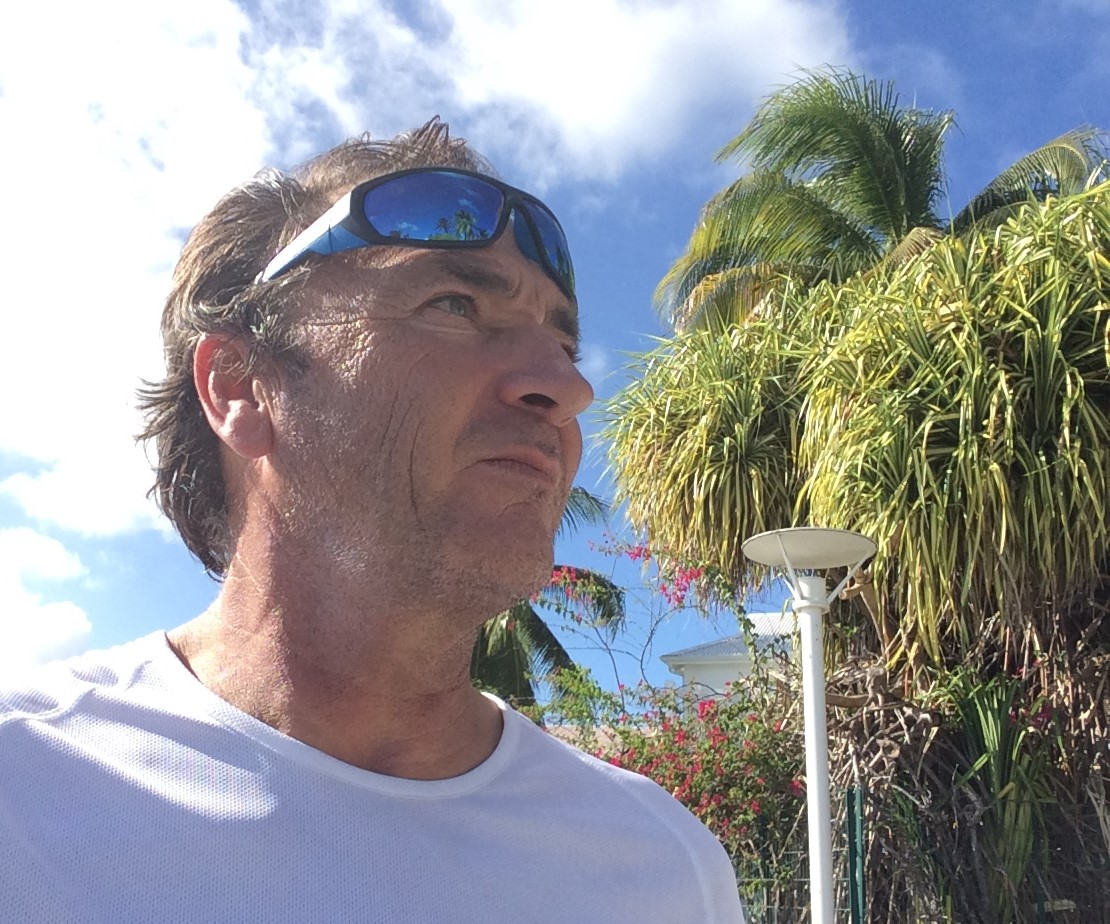
