= 2017 Youth Sailing World Championships – Girl's 420 =

Sailing competition in Sanya, China

Girl's 420 at the 2017 Youth Sailing World Championships
- Venue: Sanya, China
- Dates: 9–16 December
- Competitors: 25 from 50 nations

Medalists
gold medal	Carmen Cowles; Emma Cowles	United States
silver medal	Violette Dorange; Camille Orion	France
bronze medal	Arianna Passamonti; Giulia Fava	Italy

The girl's 420 competition at the 2017 Youth Sailing World Championships took place in Sanya, China, between 9 and 16 December 2017. 50 sailors from 25 nations were due to compete. Carmen and Emma Cowles of the United States won the event.

== Results ==
Pos	Helm	Crew	Country	R1	R2	R3	R4	R5	R6	R7	R8	R9	Total	Nett
1st	Carmen Cowles	Emma Cowles	United States	(26 DSQ)	1	2	1	2	2	2	2	1	39	13
2nd	Violette Dorange	Camille Orion	France	8	(26 DSQ)	3	3	5	1	3	1	15	65	39
3rd	Arianna Passamonti	Giulia Fava	Italy	(10)	10	5	5	1	3	4	6	6	50	40
4th	Linoy Korn	Yael Steigman	Israel	4	2	8	9	3	8	(18)	3	4	59	41
5th	Hatty Morsley	Pippa Cropley	United Kingdom	5	6	7	2	6	6	12	(23)	2	69	46
6th	Georgia Lewin-LaFrance	Madeline Gillis	Canada	9	8	1	(21)	4	16	21	5	3	88	67
7th	Maria Clara Vignati Garona	Emiliana Lopez	Argentina	15	5	4	4	19	5	7	11	(23)	93	70
8th	Solène Mariani	Maude Schmid	Switzerland	12	3	19	7	8	(23)	8	8	10	98	75
9th	Giulietta Lang	Tess Provenzal Kok	Spain	1	(26 BFD)	10	6	11	13	6	12	21	106	80
10th	Olivia Belda	Marina Arndt	Brazil	6	9	9	20	16	7	(26 UFD)	13	5	111	85
11th	Barbara Dzik	Hanna Dzik	Poland	2	13	6	15	10	4	16	(22)	20	108	86
12th	Seoyun Yoon	Sujin Kang	South Korea	3	12	12	11	18	21	13	9	(24)	123	99
13th	Laura Harding	Eleanor Grimshaw	Australia	13	4	15	18	7	(20)	20	16	13	126	106
14th	Deniz Saltik	Aylin Tezol	Turkey	11	(26 BFD)	26 DSQ	16	9	14	9	4	17	132	106
15th	Antonia Kustera	Maris Basic	Croatia	(26 DSQ)	26 BFD	11	17	12	18	1	17	8	136	110
16th	Inga-Marie Hofmann	Henrike Leitl	Germany	20	14	(21)	12	15	15	10	15	9	131	110
17th	Michaela Robinson	Elsje Dijkstra	South Africa	14	17	20	(23)	20	17	5	10	12	138	115
18th	Mafalda Goncalves	Maria Pereira	Portugal	17	15	17	13	(26 UFD)	9	17	18	11	143	117
19th	Rosario Novion	Elisa Ducasse	Chile	(23)	7	16	14	23	10	15	20	18	146	123
20th	Yuna Nakayama	Saira Takada	Japan	21	(26 BFD)	14	10	14	11	11	24	19	150	124
21st	Xanthe Copeland	Annabel Cave	New Zealand	19	11	(26 DNF)	8	13	22	26 UFD	14	16	155	129
22nd	Shuiqiong Lin	Huamei Xu	China	7	(26 DSQ)	26 BFD	19	21	19	26 UFD	7	7	158	132
23rd	Casilda Flores	Carlota Caso	Mexico	22	(26 BFD)	18	22	17	12	14	19	14	164	138
24th	Chueh-Yu Chou	Pei-Ying Chen	Chinese Taipei	16	18	22	(24)	24	24	19	21	22	190	166
25th	Gillian Perrell	Katherine Klempen	United States Virgin Islands	18	16	13	25	22	25	(26 UFD)	25	26 RET	196	170
