= Romain Attanasio =

French sailor (born 1977)

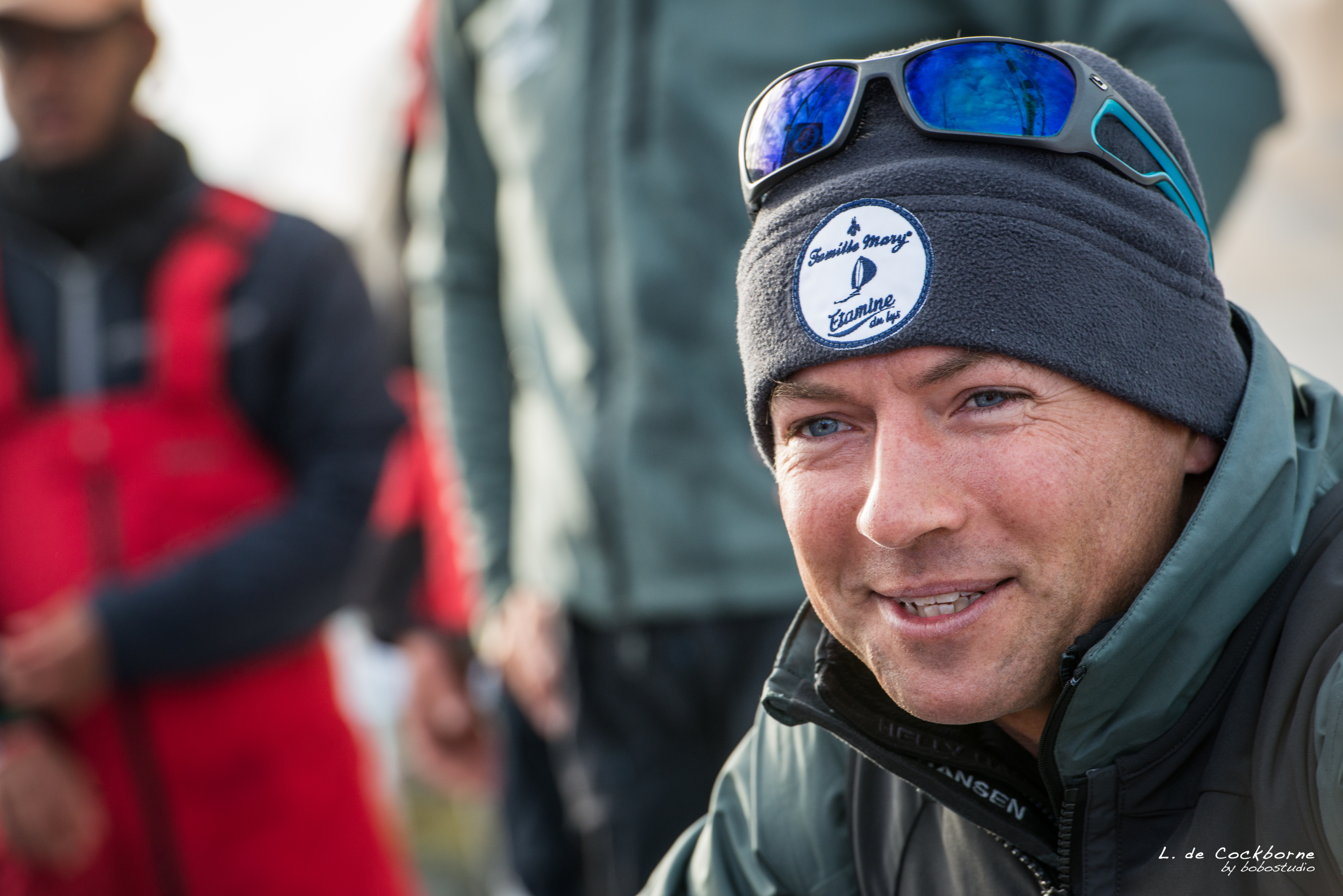

Personal information
- Nationality: French
- Born: 26 June 1977 (age 49)

Sailing career
- Sport: Sailing
- Club: C N HOEDICAIS

Romain Attanasio is a French sailor born on 26 June 1977 in Hautes-Alpes and now resides in Trégunc. He is the winner of the RORC Caribbean 600 race in 2015. He competed in the 2016–2017 Vendée Globe and 2020–2021 Vendée Globe, where he finished 15th and 14th, respectively. He has a son, Ruben, with his ex-partner, fellow professional offshore sailor Samantha Davies

== Results highlights ==
General Reference
Pos.	Year	Event	Class	Boat name	Notes	Ref.
Round the World Races
14	2021	2020–2021 Vendée Globe	IMOCA 60	PURE - BEST WESTERN	90d 2h 46m	
15	2017	2016–2017 Vendée Globe	IMOCA 60	FAMILLE MARY - ETAMINE DU LYS	109d 22h 4m	
Trans Oceanic Races
15	2019	Transat Jacques-Vabre	IMOCA 60	PURE - BEST WESTERN	with SEBASTIEN MARSSET	
15	2018	Route du Rhum	IMOCA 60			
13	2017	Transat Jacques Vabre	IMOCA 60	FAMILLE MARY - ETAMINE DU LYS	with AURELIEN DUCROZ	
9	2015	Transat Jacques-Vabre	IMOCA 60	Bureau Vallée	with Louis Burton	
13	2018	Transat AG2R	Beneteau Figaro 2	BRETAGNE CMB ESPOIR	with Pierre Rhimbault	
5	2012	Transat AG2R	Beneteau Figaro 2	Bretagne - Crédit Mutuel Performance	with Anthony Marchand	
4	2010	Transat AG2R	Beneteau Figaro 2	sur Saveol	with Samantha Davies	
2	2004	Transat AG2R	Beneteau Figaro 2	PORT TREBEURDEN	with N.Berenger	
RET	2000	Transat AG2R	Beneteau Figaro 2	LTP LOCANORD	with P.Doin	
6	2011	Transat Bénodet Martinique				
3	2004	la Transat’ Lorient-St-Barth’		sur Port Trebeurden	with Nicolas Berenger	
RET	1999	Mini Transat Race	Mini Transat 6.50		the boat sank	
Other Races
9	2015	Azimut Trophy	IMOCA 60	FAMILLE MARY - ETAMINE DU LYS		
1	2015	RORC Caribbean 600				
10	2011	Tour of Britain	SAVEOL		with NICOLAS BERENGER	
2	2009	Tour de France a la voile	Farr 30		Crewed Event	
5	2008	Solo PortsdeFrance				
21	2008	La Solitaire du Figaro	Beneteau Figaro 2			
1	2006	l’Odyssée d’Ulysse Cannes-Istanbul			with Erwan Tabarly	
