= Tanguy Le Turquais =

French offshore yachtsman

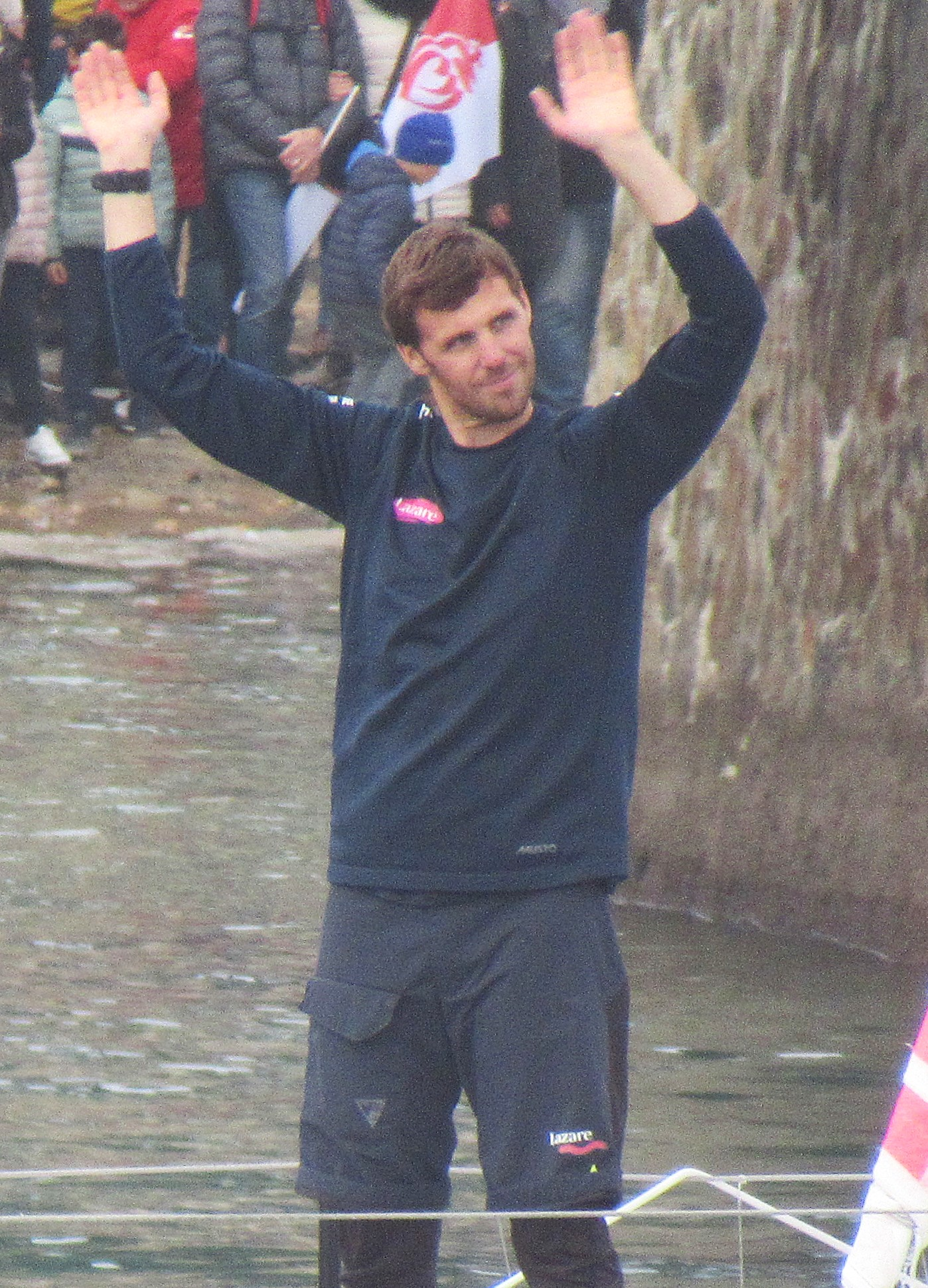
- At the start of the 2024-2025 Vendée Globe

Personal information
- Nationality: French
- Born: 25 June 1989 (age 36)
- Occupation: Offshore Sailor

Tanguy Le Turquais born 25 June 1989 is a French professional offshore sailor.

== Oceanic/Offshore Sailing ==
Pos	Year	Race	Class	Boat name	Time	Notes	Ref
Round the world races
17 / 40	2024/25	2024-2025 Vendée Globe	IMOCA 60	Lazare, FRA 1000	84d 23h 35m 29s		
Transatlantic Races
34 / 40	2023	Transat Jacques Vabre	IMOCA 60	LAZARE, FRA 1000		with Félix De Navacelle (FRA)	
13/ 38	2022	2022 Route du Rhum	IMOCA 60	LAZARE, FRA 1000	13d 10h 43m 44s		
19 / 20	2021	Transat Jacques Vabre	IMOCA 60	Les Laboratoires de Biarritz – No Limit 4 us,	24d 06h 12m 34s	with Denis Van Weynbergh (BEL)	
ABN	2019	Transat Jacques Vabre	Class40	153 - Lamotte-Module Création; Mach 40.3		with Luke Berry	
14	2018	Transat AG2R	Beneteau Figaro 2	Everial	19d 15h 51m 04s	with Clarisse Crémer	
12 / 15	2015	Transat AG2R	Beneteau Figaro 2	FRA 32 - CUISINES IXINA	26d 06h 23m 57s	with Hervé Aubry (FRA)	
3	2015	Mini Transat	Mini Transat 6.50				
6	2014	Mini Transat	Mini Transat 6.50				
Transatlantic Races
