= Violette Dorange =

French offshore sailor

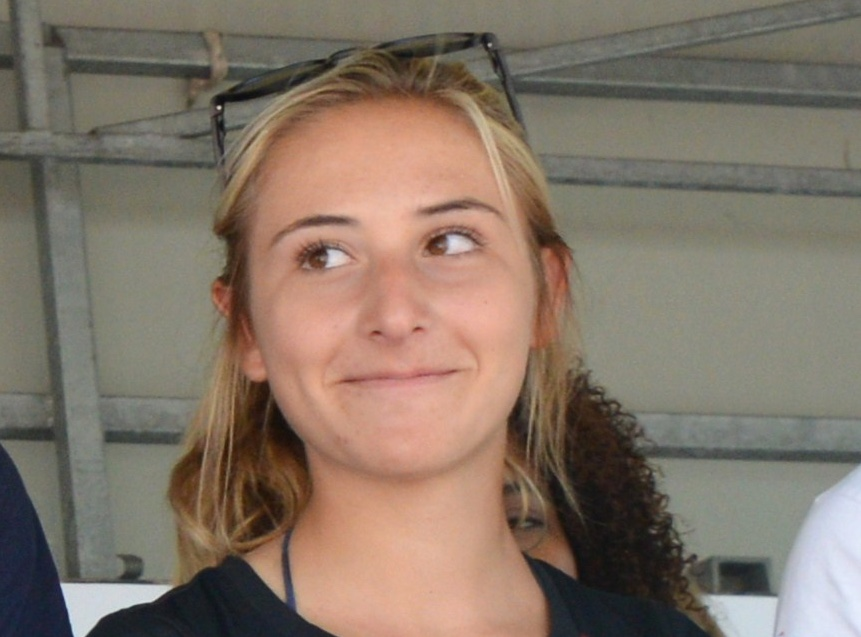

Personal information
- Nationality: French
- Born: 17 April 2001 (age 25) France

Sport

Sailing career
- Class: IMOCA 60
- Club: LA ROCHELLE NAUTIQUE

Violette Dorange (born 17 April 2001) is a French offshore professional sailor. She is an offshore sailor having competed extensively in the Figaro class before progressing to the IMOCA 60.

She started sailing at a young age competing at International Level in the International Optimist Class and the International 420 Dinghy. However under the mentorship of Jean Le Cam she transitioned to offshore sailing.

On 16 February 2025, Dorange returned to France having completed a 90 day solo round-the-world Vendee Globe race, the youngest person to do so.

== Results highlights ==
Results History
Year	Pos	Race	Class	Boat name	Note	Ref.
Round the world races
2024	25	2024-2025 Vendée Globe	IMOCA 60	Devenir	90d 22h 37m 9s	
Transatlantic Races
2025	6 / 18	2025 Transat Cafe-L'Or	IMOCA 60	Initiative Coeur 4	with Samantha Davies (GBR); 12d 21h 11m 12s	
2024	18 / 28	Transat New York Vendée	IMOCA 60	Devenir	14d 20h 10m 50S	
2023	23 / 32	Retour à la base	IMOCA 60	Devenir	12d 07h 34m 55s	
2023	21 / 40	2023 Transat Jacques Vabre	IMOCA 60	Devenir - McDonalds	with Damien Guillou (FRA); 14d 21h 27m 46s	
2023	8 / 11	La Transat	Beneteau Figaro 3		with Basile Bourgnon (FRA); 19d 05h 04m 34s	
2021	9 / 18	La Transat en Double	Beneteau Figaro 3		with Alan Roberts (GBR); 18d 08h 58m 26s	
2019	16	Mini Transat	Mini Transat 6.50			
Other
2022	10	Solitaire du Figaro	Beneteau Figaro 3			
2021	20	Solitaire du Figaro	Beneteau Figaro 3			
2020	30	Solitaire du Figaro	Beneteau Figaro 3			
2018	11	420 World Championships	420 (dinghy) / Female		with Helm Camille Orion (FRA)	
2018	3	48th Youth Sailing Worlds	420 (dinghy) / Female		with Helm Camille Orion (FRA)	
2017	2	47th Youth Sailing Worlds	420 (dinghy) / Female			
2016	3	46th Youth Sailing Worlds	420 (dinghy) / Female			
2016	4	420 World Championships	420 (dinghy) / Open U17		with Crew Camille Orion (FRA); 1st Female	
