= Sylvain Chtounder =

French Olympic sailor

Personal information
- Nationality: France
- Born: 27 July 1972 (age 53) Marseille, France
- Height: 1.88 m (6.2 ft)

Sport

Sailing career
- Class: Soling
- Club: SR Six Fours
- Updated on 29 February 2020

Sylvain Chtounder (born 1 April 1964) is a French sailor. He represented France at the 1996 Summer Olympics in Savannah, United States as crew member in the Soling. With helmsman Marc Bouet and fellow crew member Gildas Morvan they took the 11th place.
