= Armel Tripon =

French sailor

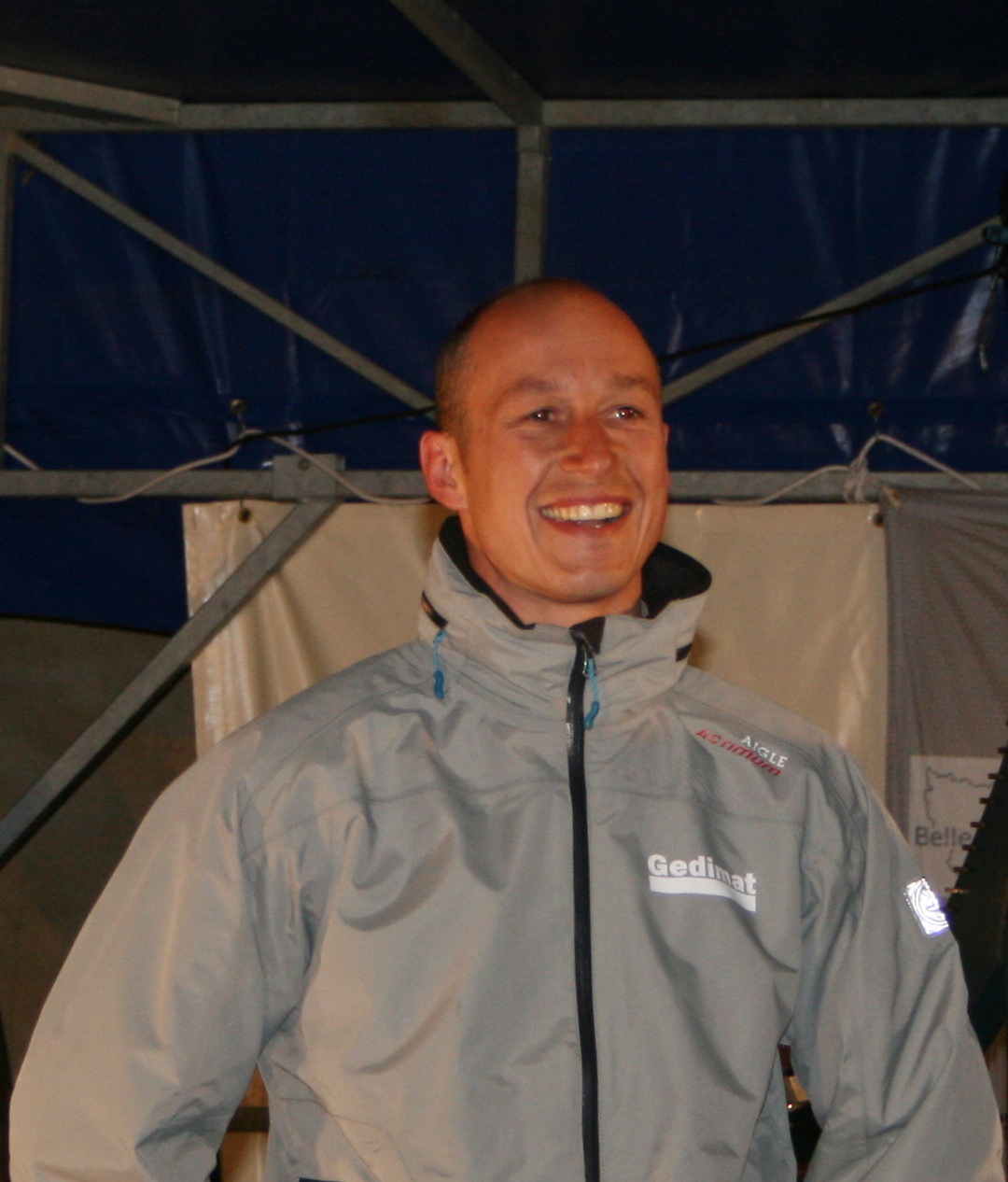
- At Belle-Île-en-Mer during the Transat BPE

Personal information
- Nickname: Armel Tripunch
- Nationality: French
- Born: 11 August 1975 (age 50) Nantes, France

Sailing career
- Sport: Sailing
- Club: S N O NANTES
- Updated on 15 January 2023

Armel Tripon (born 11 August 1975) is a French sailor who finished 11th in the 2020–2021 Vendée Globe, sailing the first Scow-influenced IMOCA designed by first-time designer Samual Manard and built by Black Pepper Yachts.

== Biography ==
He lives in Nantes, Loire-Atlantique. He is married with three children. His home port is La Trinité-sur-Mer.

== Results ==
| Year | Pos. | Event | Class | Boat name | Note | Ref |
|---|---|---|---|---|---|---|
| 2020 | 11 | 2020–2021 Vendée Globe | IMOCA 60 | L'Occitane en Provence | (84d 19h 07m 50s) | |
| 2020 | RET | Vendee Artic | IMOCA 60 | L'Occitane en Provence | | |
| 2020 | 12 | Défi Azimut | IMOCA 60 | L'Occitane en Provence | | |
| 2020 | RET | Vendée-Arctique-Les Sables d'Olonne | IMOCA 60 | L'Occitane en Provence | | |
| 2018 | 1 | Route du Rhum - Destination Guadeloupe | Multi50 | | | |
| 2017 | 3 | Transat Jacques Vabre | Multi50 | | | |
| 2017 | 2 | Grand Prix Guyader | Multi50 | REAUTE CHOCOLAT | | |
| 2017 | 1 | ArMen Race Uship | Multi50 | | | |
| 2017 | 2 | Record SNSM | Multi50 | REAUTE CHOCOLAT | with Vincent Barnaud | |
| 2016 | 8 | Les Voiles de Saint - Tropez | IRC Handicap | BLACK LEGEND 3 | Crew member | |
| 2016 | 6 | Transat Québec - Saint Malo | Class40 | BLACK PEPPER / LES P'TITS DOUDOUS | with Alexander Krause, Keese Burkhard, Lois Berrehar | |
| 2015 | 13 | LORIENT BRETAGNE SUD MINI | Mini Transat 650 | SOYEZ PRO ET OSEZ | with Ronan Lafaix | |
| 2014 | 4 | Route du Rhum - Destination Guadeloupe | IMOCA 60 | For Humble Heroes | | |
| 2013 | 6 | Transat Jacques Vabre | Class40 | SNCF GEODIS | with Fabrice Amedeo | |
| 2013 | 1 | Les Sables - Horta | Class40 | Mach40 | | |
| 2012 | 4 | Transat Québec - Saint Malo | Class40 | | | |
| 2010 | 12 | Transat AG2R | Bénéteau Figaro 2 | Gedimat | | |
| 2009 | 16 | La Solitaire du Figaro | Bénéteau Figaro 2 | Gedimat | | |
| 2007 | 9 | Championnat de France de course au large en solitaire | Gedimat | | | |
| 2007 | 22 | La Solitaire du Figaro | Bénéteau Figaro 2 | Gedimat | | |
| 2006 | 22 | La Solitaire du Figaro | Bénéteau Figaro 2 | Gedimat | | |
| 2005 | 27 | La Solitaire du Figaro | Bénéteau Figaro 2 | Gedimat | | |
| 2004 | 29 | La Solitaire du Figaro | Bénéteau Figaro 2 | Gedimat | | |
| 2004 | 15 | Transat AG2R | | | | |
