= Beneteau Figaro 3 =

Foiling one-design racing keelboat

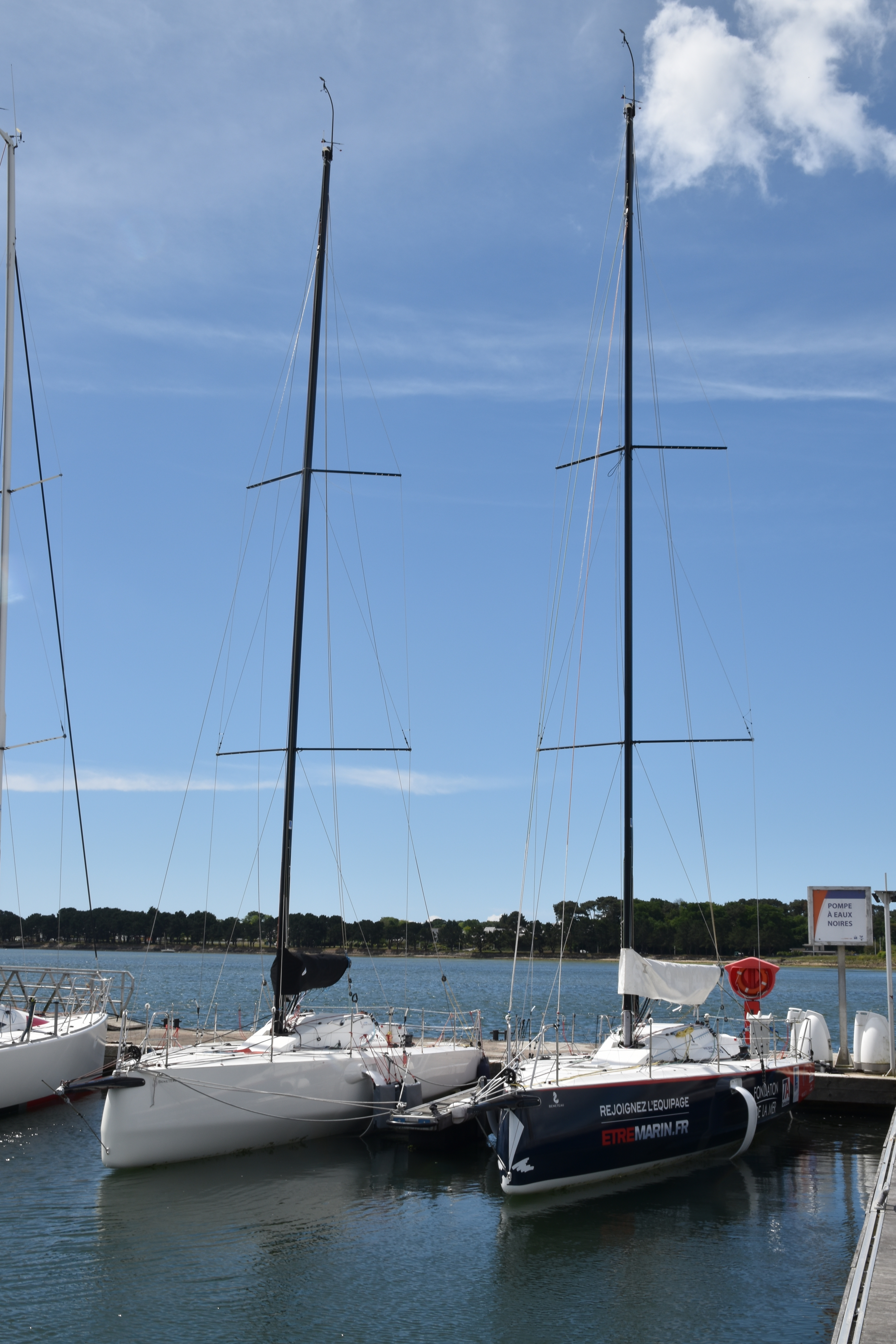

Development
- Designer: Van Peteghem/Lauriot-Prevost
- Location: France
- Year: 2018
- Builder: Beneteau
- Role: Racer
- Name: Beneteau Figaro 3

Boat
- Displacement: 7,000 lb (3,175 kg)
- Draft: 8.20 ft (2.50 m)

Hull
- Type: monohull
- Construction: glassfibre
- LOA: 35.73 ft (10.89 m)
- LOH: 32.00 ft (9.75 m)
- LWL: 31.04 ft (9.46 m)
- Beam: 11.42 ft (3.48 m)
- Engine: Nanni Industries N3 21 hp (16 kW) diesel engine

Hull appendages
- Keel: Fin keel with swept weighted bulb
- Ballast: 2,449 lb (1,111 kg)
- Rudder: Two spade-type rudders

Rig
- Rig type: Bermuda rig
- I foretriangle height: 39.93 ft (12.17 m)
- J foretriangle base: 14.60 ft (4.45 m)
- P mainsail luff: 41.50 ft (12.65 m)
- E mainsail foot: 14.21 ft (4.33 m)

Sails
- Sailplan: 9/10 Fractional rigged sloop
- Mainsail area: 425 sq ft (39.5 m^{2})
- Jib/genoa area: 328 sq ft (30.5 m^{2})
- Gennaker area: 1,130 sq ft (105 m^{2})
- Upwind sail area: 753 sq ft (70.0 m^{2})
- Downwind sail area: 1,555 sq ft (144.5 m^{2})

The Beneteau Figaro 3, officially called the Figaro Beneteau 3, is a French hydrofoil-equipped sailboat that was designed by Van Peteghem/Lauriot-Prevost as a one design racer specifically for the Solitaire du Figaro race and first built in 2018. The boat and the race are named for the race's sponsor, the French newspaper Le Figaro.

The design is the first foiling, production, monohull, sailboat and replaced the Beneteau Figaro 2 as the boat for the Solitaire du Figaro race.

== Production ==
The design has been built by Beneteau in France since in 2018. As of 2023 it remains in production.

== Design ==
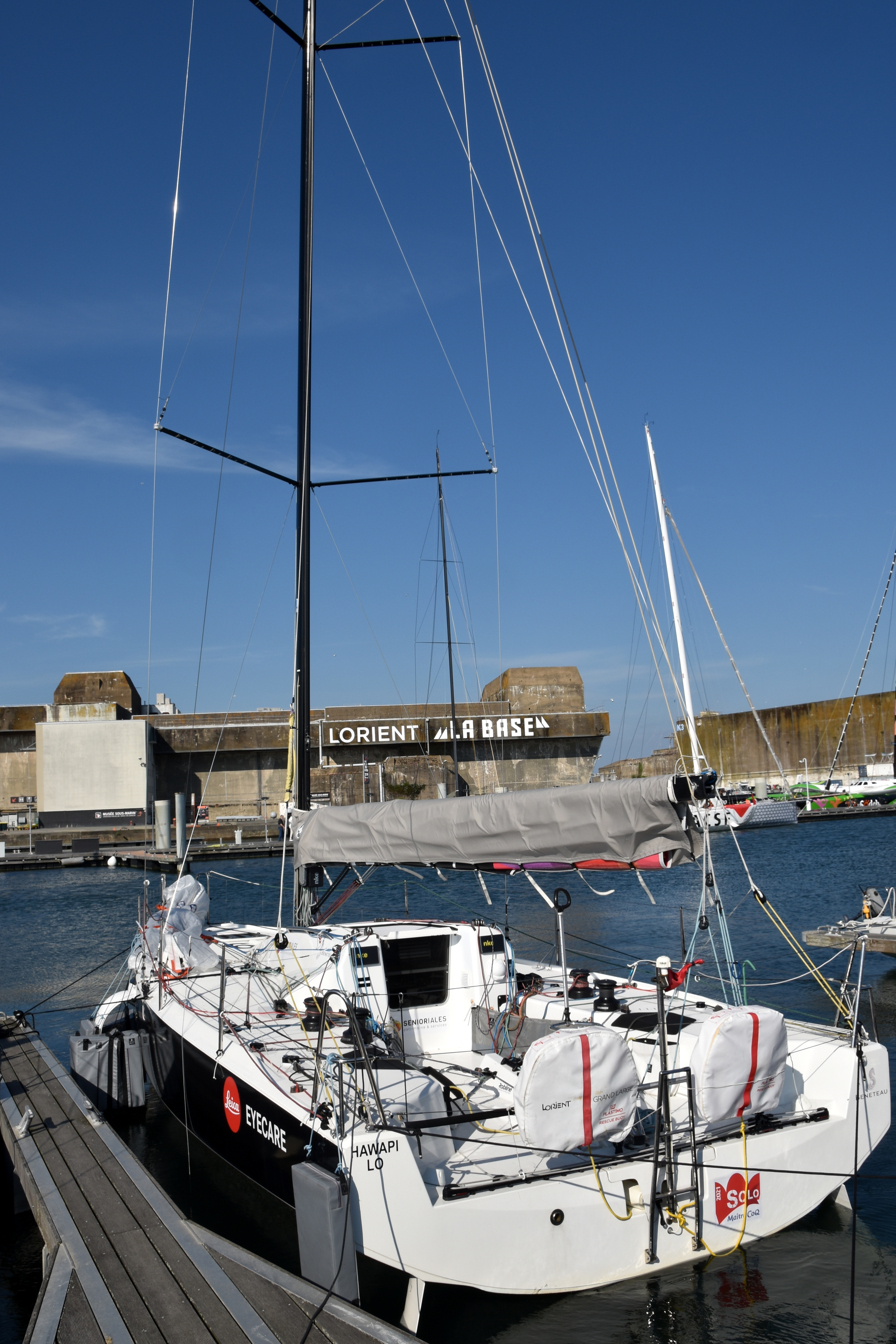
Figaro 3, showing the open transom

The Figaro 3 is a recreational keelboat, built predominantly of a vacuum infused polyester glassfibre and PVC foam sandwich. It has a 9/10 fractional sloop rig with a square-topped mainsail. It has a deck-stepped mast, two sets of swept spreaders, a carbon fibre and aluminium boom and a fixed bowsprit. The hull has a reverse stem, a plumb, open transom, dual internally mounted spade-type rudders controlled by a tiller with an extension and a fixed cast iron fin keel with a swept, weighted iron and lead bulb. The keel may be removed for ground transport. It is equipped with two midship, independent, manually controlled, retractable, carbon fibre, Chistera hydrofoils. It displaces 7,000 lb (3,175 kg) and carries 2,449 lb (1,111 kg) of ballast. It is also equipped with an autopilot.

The boat has a draft of 8.20 ft (2.50 m) with the standard keel.

The boat is fitted with a French Nanni Industries N3 diesel engine of 21 hp (16 kW) for docking and manoeuvring. The fuel tank holds 11 U.S. gallons (42 L; 9.2 imp gal).

The design interior is normally minimal, consisting of two 2 canvas bunks with aluminum frames, but can be equipped to suit.

For reaching and downwind sailing the design may is equipped with an asymmetrical spinnaker of 1,130 sq ft (105 m^{2}) flown from the bowsprit.

The design has a hull speed of 7.47 kn (13.83 km/h).

== Operational history ==
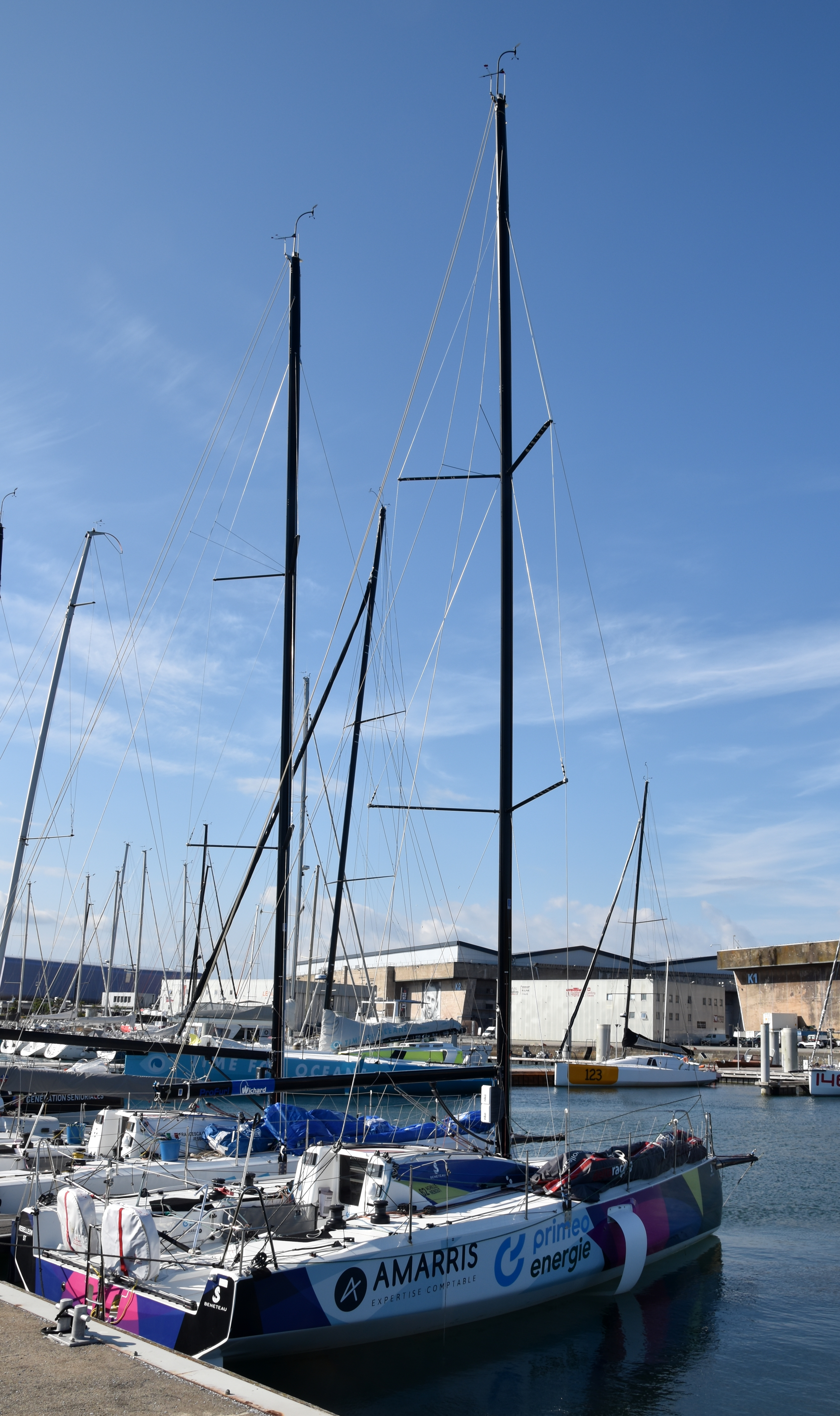
Figaro 3s, showing the mast arrangement

The design was named the 2019 Sail Magazine Best Performance Boat 31 ft and over as well as the 2019 Sailing World - Boat of the Year: Overall Winner.

In a 2017 review for Sailing Magazine, naval architect Robert Perry wrote, "This boat is all about horsepower per pound and using it to the fullest. The SA/D, using the specified light displacement and all of the square-topped mainsail is 35. This is about double what you would have found in the racing boats of the mid-1960s. A fixed sprit allows you to fly either a hounds asym or a near masthead asym chute. Note how far aft the mast is stepped ... I'd love to go for a sail on one of these boats."

In a 2016 Yachting World review, Toby Hodges wrote about the foils, "These novel looking foils are designed to replace the traditional weighty ballast tanks used on past Figaro models. Described as 'asymmetric tip foils' they work by creating side force to supplement the skinny keel and reduce leeway while causing minimal drag. An important factor is also that they are able to retract within the boat’s maximum beam. In short foils can herald a step-change – a Figaro 3 with foils working is expected to be up to 15 per cent faster than its predecessor."

In a 2019 review for Yacht Style, Darren Catterall described sailing the boat, "taking the helm was a pleasant surprise. The Figaro 3 is incredibly light and very sensitive for a yacht this size. She responds like a dinghy, quickly and happily going wherever you want her. As she was designed for single or double-handed racing, the light helm is necessary to ensure the auto-helm system is not overstressed during long offshore races ... The Figaro 3 is built for speed, not for comfort, and is best offshore where she is going to excel in tough conditions and remind sailors what it is to be alive."

== Events ==
The success of the class is due to the competitive events the boat is eligible for which include.

- Solitaire du Figaro
- La Transat en Double (Two Person - Bi Annual - Trans Atlantic Race from Concarneau - Saint-Barthélemy)
- Solo Maitre CoQ
- Tour de Bretagne à la Voile
- Sardinha Cup
- Solo Guy Cotten
- The Rolex Fastnet Race - Class Start
