= Gildas Morvan =

Olympic sailor from France

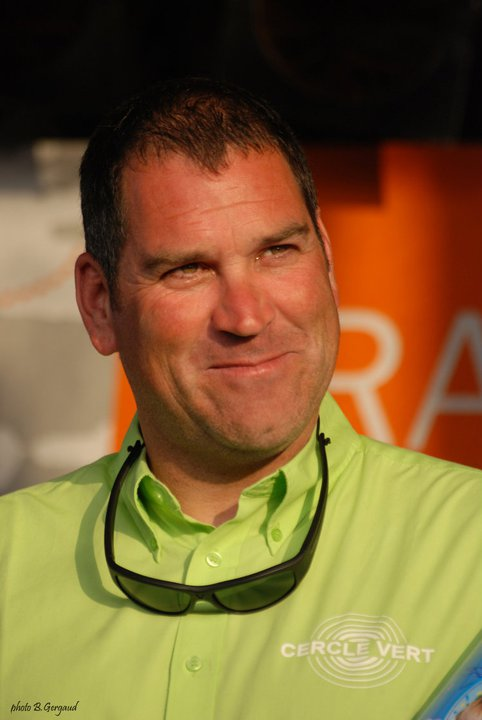
- Morvan in 2016

Personal information
- Nationality: French
- Born: 31 July 1968 (age 57) Pretoria, South Africa
- Height: 1.88 m (6.2 ft)

Sport

Sailing career
- Class: Soling
- Club: SR Brest
- Updated on 29 February 2020

Gildas Morvan (born 31 July 1968) is a sailor from France, who represented his country at the 1996 Summer Olympics in Savannah, United States as crew member in the Soling. With helmsman Marc Bouet and fellow crew member Sylvain Chtounder, they finished in the 11th place.
