= 2024–2025 Vendée Globe =

Event title
- Name: 2024–2025 Vendée Globe
- Edition: 10th edition
- Sponsor: Vendée Region of France

Event details
- Start location: Les Sables-d'Olonne
- Finish location: Les Sables-d'Olonne
- Course: Single person non-stop round the world race
- Dates: Start: 10 November 2024; First finisher: 14 January 2025; Last finisher: 7 March 2025
- Yachts: IMOCA 60
- Key people: Hubert Lemonnier (Race Director)

Competitors
- Competitors: Max. 40 Boats

Results
- (gold) Gold: Charlie Dalin (FRA)
- (silver) Silver: Yoann Richomme (FRA)
- (bronze) Bronze: Sébastien Simon (FRA)

The 2024–2025 Vendée Globe was a non-stop round the world yacht race for IMOCA 60 class yachts crewed by only one person. It was the tenth edition of the race; it started (on 10 November 2024), and finished, in Les Sables-d'Olonne, France.

== Results ==
Classified results for the 2024–2025 edition
Pos.	Sail no.	Boat name	Year	Skipper	G	Finish time	Elapsed time	Deltas	Delta %	Speed rhum/water	Distance sailed	Ref.
1	FRA 79	MACIF Santé; Prévoyance (2)	2023	Charlie Dalin (FRA)	M	2025-01-14 - 07:24:49	64d 19h 22m 49s	-	0%	15.37 / 17.79	27668	
2	FRA 24	Paprec Arkéa (6)	2023	Yoann Richomme (FRA)	M	2025-01-15 - 06:12:02	65d 18h 10m 02s	0d 22h 47m 13s	1.47%	15.15 / 17.95	28326	
3	FRA 112	Groupe Dubreuil	2021	Sébastien Simon (FRA)	M	2025-01-17 - 00:27:37	67d 12h 25m 37s	2d 17h 02m 48s	4.18%	14.75 / 17.16	27807	
4	FRA 3	Charal (2)	2022	Jérémie Beyou (FRA)	M	2025-01-24 - 00:58:54	74d 12h 56m 54s	10d 03h 15m 26s	15.02%	13.36 / 16.24	29049	
5	FRA 2030	Biotherm	2022	Paul Meilhat (FRA)	M	2025-01-24 - 10:40:15	74d 22h 38m 15s	10d 12h 26m 52s	15.64%	13.29 / 15.6	28051	
6	FRA 85	Holcim - PRB	2022	Nicolas Lunven (FRA)	M	2025-01-24 - 19:51:41	75d 07h 49m 41s	10d 12h 26m 52s	16.23%	13.22 / 16.26	29389	
7	FRA 49	For People	2023	Thomas Ruyant (FRA)	M	2025-01-25 - 04:49:27	75d 17h 47m 27s	10d 22h 24m 38s	16.87%	13.15 / 16.15	29360	
8	FRA 08	TeamWork.net	2018	Justine Mettraux (SUI)	F	2025-01-25 - 13:38:52	76d 01h 36m 52s	11d 06h 14m 03s	17.37%	13.09 / 15.39	28102	
9	FRA 100	For the Planet	2019	Sam Goodchild (GBR)	M	2025-01-25 - 14:03:45	76d 02h 01m 45s	11d 06h 38m 56s	17.4%	13.09 / 15.64	28557	
10	FRA 9	Guyot Environnement	2015	Benjamin Dutreux (FRA)	M	2025-01-26 - 15:41:24	77d 03h 39m 24s	12d 08h 16m 35s	19.05%	12.91 / 15.4	28514	
11	FRA 15	L'OCCITANE en Provence (2)	2019	Clarisse Crémer (FRA)	F	2025-01-27 - 03:36:28	77d 15h 34m 28s	12d 20h 11m 39s	19.81%	12.83 / 14.97	27901	
12	MON 1297	Malizia-Seaexplorer	2022	Boris Herrmann (GER)	M	2025-01-29 - 23:18:41	80d 10h 16m 41s	15d 14h 53m 52s	24.1%	12.38 / 15.13	29201	
13	FRA 109	Initiatives-Cœur 4	2022	Samantha Davies (GBR)	F	2025-01-30 - 10:15:39	80d 22h 13m 39s	16d 02h 50m 50s	24.87%	12.31 / 14.72	28584	
14	FRA 10	Fortinet-Best Western	2015	Romain Attanasio (FRA)	M	2025-02-02 - 10:50:18	83d 22h 48m 18s	19d 03h 25m 29s	29.54%	11.86 / 14.34	28899	
15	FRA 13	Groupe Apicil (2)	2015	Damien Seguin (FRA)	M	2025-02-03 - 08:33:48	84d 20h 31m 48s	20d 01h 08m 59s	30.93%	11.74 / 14.37	29263	
16	FRA 30	Monnoyeur Duo For A Job	2011	Benjamin Ferré (FRA)	M	2025-02-03 - 11:21:50	84d 23h 19m 50s	20d 03h 57m 01s	31.11%	11.72 / 13.81	28167	
17	FRA 1000	Lazare	2008	Tanguy Le Turquais (FRA)	M	2025-02-03 - 11:37:29	84d 23h 35m 29s	20d 04h 12m 40s	31.13%	11.72 / 13.66	27863	
18	SUI 7	Hublot	2019	Alan Roura (SUI)	M	2025-02-03 - 11:57:48	84d 23h 55m 48s	20d 04h 32m 59s	31.15%	11.72 / 14.00	28554	"
19	FRA 27	MACSF	2007	Isabelle Joschke (FRA) (GER)	F	2025-02-03 - 23:28:36	85d 11h 26m 36s	20d 16h 03m 47s	31.89%	11.65 / 14.46	29660	
20	FRA 29	Tout commence en Finistère - Armor-lux	2023	Jean Le Cam (FRA)	M	2025-02-04 - 03:53:02	85d 15h 51m 02s	20d 20h 28m 13s	32.18%	11.63 / 13.61	27978	
21	NZL 64	MS Amlin	2007	Conrad Colman (NZL) (USA)	M	2025-02-04 - 04:06:33	85d 16h 04m 33s	20d 20h 41m 44s	32.19%	11.63 / 13.58	27913	
22	ITA 34	Prysmian Group	2015	Giancarlo Pedote (ITA)	M	2025-02-04 - 08:34:01	85d 20h 32m 01s	21d 01h 09m 12s	32.48%	11.6 / 14.17	29193	
23	FRA 22	Freelance.com	2007	Guirec Soudée (FRA)	M	2025-02-08 - 08:18:20	89d 20h 16m 20s	25d 00h 53m 31s	38.63%	11.09 / 12.97	27970	
24	JPN 11	DMG Mori Global One	2019	Kojiro Shiraishi (JPN)	M	2025-02-09 - 09:36:41	90d 21h 34m 41s	26d 02h 11m 52s	40.26%	10.96 / 13.15	28696	
25	FRA 1	Devenir - McDonalds	2007	Violette Dorange (FRA)	F	2025-02-09 - 10:39:09	90d 22h 37m 09s	26d 03h 14m 20s	40.33%	10.95 / 12.85	28057	
26	FRA 172	Fives Group - Lantana Environment	2006	Louis Duc (FRA)	M	2025-02-09 - 12:10:38	91d 00h 08m 48s	26d 04h 45m 59s	40.43%	10.95 / 12.88	28142	
27	FRA 83	Foussier - Mon courtier énergie	2006	Sébastien Marsset (FRA)	M	2025-02-09 - 12:37:35	91d 00h 35m 35s	26d 05h 12m 46s	40.45%	10.94 / 12.77	27895	
28	FRA 1461	Human Immobilier	2006	Antoine Cornic (FRA)	M	2025-02-14 - 13:02:59	96d 01h 00m 59s	31d 05h 38m 10s	48.2%	10.37 / 11.8	27203	
29	SUI 49	TUT GUT	2008	Oliver Heer (SUI)	M	2025-02-17 - 17:29:34	99d 05h 27m 34s	34d 10h 04m 45s	53.11%	10.04 / 11.64	27724	
30	CHN 5	Singchain Team Haikou	2007	Jingkun Xu (CHN)	M	2025-02-18 - 07:08:11	99d 20h 06m 11s	35d 00h 43m 22s	54.05%	9.98 / 11.53	27616	
31	FRA 71	Coup de Pouce	2007	Manuel Cousin (FRA)	M	2025-03-01 - 12:40:38	111d 00h 38m 38s	46d 05h 15m 49s	71.32%	8.97 / 11.01	29350	
32	FRA 56	Nexans – Art & Fenêtres	2007	Fabrice Amedeo (FRA)	M	2025-03-04 - 14:00:49	114d 01h 58m 49s	49d 06h 36m 00s	76.03%	8.73 / 10.56	28926	
TLE	BEL 207	D'Ieteren Group	2014	Denis Van Weynbergh (BEL)	M	2025-03-08	Completed 24 hours over the race timelimit					
DNF	FRA 14	La Mie Câline	2010	Arnaud Boissières (FRA)	M	2025-02-02 13:00:00	Retired unaided to Martinique (Dismasted)					
DNF	FRA 5	Stand As One - Altavia	2023	Éric Bellion (FRA)	M	2025-01-12 08:00:00	Retired unaided to the Falklands (Forestay Damage)					
DNF	FRA 17	Maitre Coq V	2022	Yannick Bestaven (FRA)	M	2024-12-30 08:00:00	Retired unaided to Ushuaia (ARG) (Steering Damage)					
DNF	GBR 77	Medallia 2	2015	Pip Hare (GBR)	F	2024-12-16 20:09:00	Retired unaided to Melbourne (AUS) (Dismasted)					
DNF	HUN 23	New Europe	2007	Szabolcs Weöres (HUN)	M	2024-12-16 18:30:00	Retired unaided to Cape Town (RSA) (D2 Rigging Damage)					
DNF	FRA 2	Bureau Vallée (3)	2020	Louis Burton (FRA)	M	2024-12-05 05:00:00	Retired unaided to Cape Town (RSA) (Rigging damage)					
DNF	FRA 53	V&B-Monbana-Mayenne	2022	Maxime Sorel (FRA)	M	2024-11-15 13:25:00	Retired unaided to Madeira (Ankle Injury)					

== Qualification ==
The race organisers have published the initial notice of race allowing a record entry of 40 boats to compete. The rules now prohibit older IMOCA 60 from competing, with 2008 generation boats being the oldest allowed to compete. The 13 first, new-boat skipper combinations starting two of five solo races (one in 2022 or 2023 and one in 2024) qualification races and finishing one of them will be selected automatically.

Significant events during qualifying included:

- Sailor Fabrice Amedeo (FRA) lost his boat Newrest – Art & Fenêtres to a fire (following a leak and an explosion) during a qualifying race in 2022. He was able to secure another boat for his participation in the race.
- Banque Populaire choose to end its sponsorship with Clarisse Crémer (FRA), citing her young child as one of the reason, the public backlash led to the sponsor withdrawing and Crémer quickly found a new sponsor (L'Occitane En Provence) with the support of Alex Thompson Racing.
- Following the second dismasting of his boat during the Defi Azimut in October 2023 after a previous dismasting in the 2020-2021 Vendée Globe, Nicolas Troussel (FRA) lost the support of his sponsor Corum and with that the boat Corum l'Epargne. Nonetheless he reached official candidate status.
- Kevin Escoffier (FRA) lost support of his team and therefore the use of Holcim-PRB due to allegations of inappropriate behaviour towards women during The Ocean Race 2022–23. He was replaced by Nicolas Lunven.
- Charlie Dalin (FRA) was not able to take part in a solo qualification race in 2023 due to health issues, missing a key qualification requirement. An exemption in the rules allowed him to meet the requirement by crossing the starting line for the 2023 Transat Jacques Vabre.
- Éric Bellion (FRA) was not able to take part in the 2023 Retour à la Base due to damage taken during the 2023 Transat Jacques Vabre. An exemption for this case in the rules allowed him to fulfil the requirement of taking part in a solo race in 2022 or 2023.
- Phil Sharp (GBR) was not able to meet the requirement of taking part in a solo race in 2022 or 2023 due to damage taken to is new boat Oceanslab during the transfer to the start of the 2023 Retour à la Base. As Jean le Cam was able to start this race, Sharp lost the chance of qualifying through the new-boat rule. He did not qualify.
- François Guiffant (FRA) was allowed to take part in the qualification with an older boat from 2004 (Partage). He got an exemption to take part in the 2024 Vendée Globe conditional on fewer than 40 skippers qualifying and a place not being able to be filled. He did not qualify.
- The following campaigns were announced but did not reach candidate status:
  - Armel Tripon (FRA) announced a VPLP designed boat from the moulds of Malizia-Seaexplorer to be built by Airbus. The project was late and is unlikely to make the 2024 edition of the race but is progressing.
  - Jörg Riechers (GER) announced a group design by Farr Yacht Design, Guillaume Dupont and Etienne Bertrand and built by Alva Yachts. Though no official announcement has been made, the project seems to be abandoned.
- James Harayda (GBR) was not able to collect sufficient miles to qualify.
- Romain Attanasio (FRA) was dismasted on 13 September 2024 during the 48 hour Azimut Challenge; fellow competitor Maxime Sorel (FRA) made his spare mast available as a replacement so that Attanasio could start the Vendeé Globe.

== Competitors ==
Skipper		Boat						Ref.
Name	Start / Finish	Name	Designer	Builder	Date launched	First name and VG	Notes	Ref.
Antoine Cornic (FRA)	Never	Human Immobilier	Owen-Clarke	Chris Prior de Coburg (CAN)	2005-08-23	Spirit of Canada VG08		
Sébastien Marsset (FRA)	Never	Foussier - Mon courtier énergie	Farr Yacht Design	JMV Industries (FRA)	2006-07-26	Delta Dore VG08		
Louis Duc (FRA)	Never	Fives Group - Lantana Environment	Farr Yacht Design	CDK Technologies (FRA)	2006-09-30	PRB VG08		
Manuel Cousin (FRA)	1 / 1 (23rd)	Coup de Pouce	Farr Yacht Design	Southern Ocean Marine (NZL)	2007-02-03	Paprec-Virbac VG08		
Violette Dorange (FRA)	Never	Devenir	Farr Yacht Design	CDK Technologies (FRA)	2007-05-29	Foncia VG08		
Guirec Soudée (FRA)	Never	Freelance.com	Farr Yacht Design	Offshore Challenges (GBR)	2007-06-25	BT VG08		
Jingkun Xu (CHN)	Never	Singchain Team Haikou	Finot-Conq	Multiplast (FRA)	2007-07-17	Brit Air VG08	Foils retrofitted	
Fabrice Amedeo (FRA)	2 / 1 (11th)	Nexans – Art & Fenêtres	Owen-Clarke	Hakes Marine (NZL)	2007-07-31	Ecover VG08		
Isabelle Joschke (GER) (FRA)	1 / 0	MACSF	VPLP – Verdier	Chantier Naval de Larros (FRA)	2007-08-06	Safran VG08	Foils retrofitted	
Conrad Colman (NZL) (USA)	1 / 1 (16th)	Mail Boxes Etc.	VPLP – Verdier	Indiana Yachting (ITA)	2007-09-05	Groupe Bel VG08		|
Szabolcs Weöres (HUN)	Never	New Europe	Owen-Clarke	Hakes Marine (NZL)	2007-12-17	Aviva VG08		
Tanguy Le Turquais (FRA)	Never	Lazare	Finot-Conq	Multiplast (FRA)	2008-05-29	DCNS VG08		
Oliver Heer (SUI)	Never	Oliver Heer Ocean Racing	Farr Yacht Desig	Southern Ocean Marine (NZL)	2008-08-19	Gitana Eighty VG08		
Arnaud Boissières (FRA)	4 / 4 (8th)	La Mie Câline	VPLP – Verdier	CDK Technologies (FRA)	2010-09-18	Banque Populaire VG12	Foils retrofitted	
Benjamin Ferré (FRA)	Never	Monnoyeur Duo For A Job	VPLP – Verdier	CDK Technologies (FRA)	2011-08-16	Macif VG12		
Denis Van Weynbergh (BEL)	Never	D'Ieteren Group	Nandor Fa	Pauger Composite (HUN)	2014-04-07	Spirit of Hungary VG16		
Damien Seguin (FRA)	1 / 1 (7th)	Groupe Apicil 2	VPLP – Verdier	CDK Technologies (FRA)	2015-03-15	Safran VG16		
Pip Hare (GBR)	1 / 1 (19th)	Medallia 2	VPLP – Verdier	CDK Technologies (FRA)	2015-06-09	Banque Populaire VG16		
Romain Attanasio (FRA)	2 / 2 (14th)	Fortinet-Best Western	VPLP – Verdier	Chantier Multiplast (FRA)	2015-08-06	Edmond de Rotschild VG16		
Benjamin Dutreux (FRA)	1 / 1 (9th)	Guyot Environnement: Water Family	VPLP – Verdier	Green Marine (GBR)	2015-09-01	Hugo Boss VG16		
Giancarlo Pedote (ITA)	1 / 1 (8th)	Prysmian Group	VPLP – Verdier	Multiplast (FRA)	2015-09-11	St Michel Virbac VG16		
Justine Mettraux (SUI)	Never	TeamWork.net	VPLP	CDK Technologies (FRA)	2018-08-20	Charal VG20		
Alan Roura (SUI)	2 / 2 (12th)	Hublot	VPLP – Pete Hobson	Carrington Boats (GBR)	2019-04-08	Hugo Boss VG20		
Clarisse Crémer (FRA)	1 / 1 (12th)	L'OCCITANE en Provence (2)	Guillaume Verdier	CDK Technologies (FRA)	2019-05-08	Apivia VG20		
Sam Goodchild (GBR)	Never	Vulnerable (For the Planet)	Guillaume Verdier	Persico Marine (ITA)	2019-07-09	Linkedout VG20	Baptismal name Nat'che	f
Kojiro Shiraishi (JPN)	2 / 1 (16th)	DMG Mori Global One	VPLP	Multiplast (FRA)	2019-09-02	DMG Mori VG20		
Louis Burton (FRA)	3 / 2 (3rd)	Bureau Vallée 3	Sam Manuard	Pauger Composites (HUN); Black Pepper Yachts (FRA)	2020-01-31	L'Occitane en Provence VG20	First SCOW Design	
Sébastien Simon (FRA)	1 / 0	Groupe Dubreuil	Guillaume Verdier	CDK Technologies (FRA)	2021-08-24		Former 11th Hour - Mālama	
Nicolas Lunven (FRA)	Never	Holcim - PRB	Guillaume Verdier	Carrington Boats (GBR)	2022-05-07			
Maxime Sorel (FRA)	1 / 1 (10th)	V&B-Monbana-Mayenne	Guillaume Verdier	Mer Concept (FRA)	2022-06-27		Sistership to Apivia (1)	
Jérémie Beyou (FRA)	4 / 2 (3rd)	Charal (2)	Samuel Manuard	CDK Technologies (FRA)	2022-07-11			
Boris Herrmann (GER)	1 / 1 (5th)	Malizia-Seaexplorer	VPLP / Boris Herrmann	Multiplast (FRA)	2022-07-19			
Samantha Davies (GBR)	3 / 1 (5th)	Initiatives-Cœur 4	Sam Manuard	Pauger Composites (HUN)	2022-07-30		Sistership to L'Occitane	
Yannick Bestaven (FRA)	2 / 1 (1st)	Maitre Coq V	Guillaume Verdier	CDK Technologies (FRA)	2022-08-29		Sistership to Groupe Dubreuil	
Paul Meilhat (FRA)	1 / 0	Biotherm	Guillaume Verdier	Persico Marine (ITA)	2022-08-31		Sistership to LinkedOut	
Thomas Ruyant (FRA)	2 / 1 (6th)	Vulnerable (For People)	Antoine Koch / Finot-Conq	CDK Technologies (FRA)	2023-03-16		Sistership to Paprec Arkéa	
Yoann Richomme (FRA)	Never	Paprec Arkéa (6)	Antoine Koch / Finot-Conq	Multiplast (FRA)	2023-02-22		Sistership to For People	
Éric Bellion (FRA)	1 / 1 (9th)	Stand As One - Altavia	David Raison	Persico Marine (ITA)	2023-06-17		No foils; Sistership to Armor-lux	
Charlie Dalin (FRA)	1 / 1 (2nd)	MACIF Santé Prévoyance (2)	Guillaume Verdier	CDK Technologies (FRA)	2023-06-24			
Jean Le Cam (FRA)	5 / 4 (2nd)	Tout commence en Finistère - Armor-lux	David Raison	Persico Marine (ITA)	2023-09-30		No foils; Sistership to Stand As One	
