= 2028–2029 Vendée Globe =

Event title
- Name: 2028–2029 Vendée Globe
- Edition: 11th edition
- Sponsor: Vendée Region of France

Event details
- Start location: Les Sables-d'Olonne
- Finish location: Les Sables-d'Olonne
- Course: Single person non-stop round the world race
- Dates: Start: 12 November 2028
- Yachts: IMOCA 60
- Key people: Hubert Lemonnier (Race Director)

Competitors
- Competitors: Max. 40 Boats

The 2028–2029 Vendée Globe is a non-stop round the world yacht race for IMOCA 60 class yachts crewed by only one person. The eleventh edition of the race will start (on 12 November 2028) and end, in Les Sables-d'Olonne, France. Up to 40 skippers will be able to participate.

== Rule changes ==
For 2028, the Vendée Globe brings several technical evolutions aimed at improving safety, energy autonomy, and rule clarity. The most visible shift is the strengthened requirement for energy management: each IMOCA must now sail the race with a strict 120-liter fuel ceiling, split into 60 liters freely usable and 60 liters sealed reserve, whose use results in penalties. This marks a significant change from previous editions, reflecting the race's push toward near-total onboard energy autonomy. Fully electric boats also face a new rule – they must always maintain enough stored battery power to motor five hours at five knots, ensuring a minimum emergency propulsion capability.

Safety and tracking systems also become more standardized. Charting and navigation requirements remain comprehensive, but the race formalizes the full list of mandatory paper charts covering the entire circumnavigation – an increasingly unusual demand in a digital era, yet still required for redundancy and safety.

Another meaningful shift concerns sails and equipment management: the sail inventory becomes locked once submitted at the start briefing, and no changes are permitted without explicit Race Management approval. This reduces the arms-race effect late in the preparation cycle and forces more strategic planning ahead of time.

Finally, the event expands its obligations for onboard media and scientific equipment, which skippers must carry and operate according to the race's annexes. These systems – cameras, sensors, and communication modules – are now an integral part of the technical setup rather than optional additions, reflecting the dual nature of the Vendée Globe as both a sporting and scientific showcase.

== Qualification ==
A skipper must:

- Finish one solo Globe Series race (Arctique, RDR, Retour à La Base, Transat CIC, NY–Vendée).
- Finish within ≤2× the winner's time.

Selection rules (only if >40 entries)

- New points-based system replaces mileage ranking.
- Points earned across 18 Imoca Globe Series events (Grades 1–4).
- Crew and co-skippers get 50% of main skipper's points.
- Only a sailor's nine best results out of 13 Grade 1–3 races count.
- Half-points awarded to sailors who abandon after completing at least 50% of a race.
- Three wild cards available (up from one in 2024).

== Competitors ==
Multiple sailors have announced to target a participation in the 2028 Vendée Globe.

Eleven skippers have publicly announced projects with a new yacht:

- Armel Tripon (Les Petit Doudous, VPLP, launched 2025)
- Élodie Bonafous (Association Petits Princes – Quéguiner, launched 2025)
- Thomas Ruyant (KFC, CDK)
- Boris Herrmann (Malizia 4, KFC, CDK)
- Lois Berrehar (Banque Populaire XIV, KFC, CDK)
- Sébastien Simon (Groupe Dubreuil, Verdier, Carrington)
- Justine Mettraux (TeamWork – Team SNEF, Verdier, CDK)
- Yohan Richomme (Paprec, KFC, Multiplast)
- Sam Goodchild (MACIF, Verdier, CDK)
- Benjamin Dutreux (4CAD, KFC, Multiplast)
- DMG Mori sailing team (Verdier, Multiplast), skipper to be determined

Following skippers have announced a campaign with a boat previously launched:

- Scott Shawyer (Emira IV)
- Francesca Clapcich (11th hour racing)
- Ambrogio Beccaria (Allagrande Mapei)
- Manuel Cousin (Coup de Pouce)
- Arnaud Boissiéres (La Mie Caline)
- Nicolas d'Estais (Café Joyeux)
- Phil Sharp (Ocean Lab)
- Masa Suzuki (???)
