= IMOCA 60 V&B Monbana Mayenne =

V&B-Monbana-Mayenne
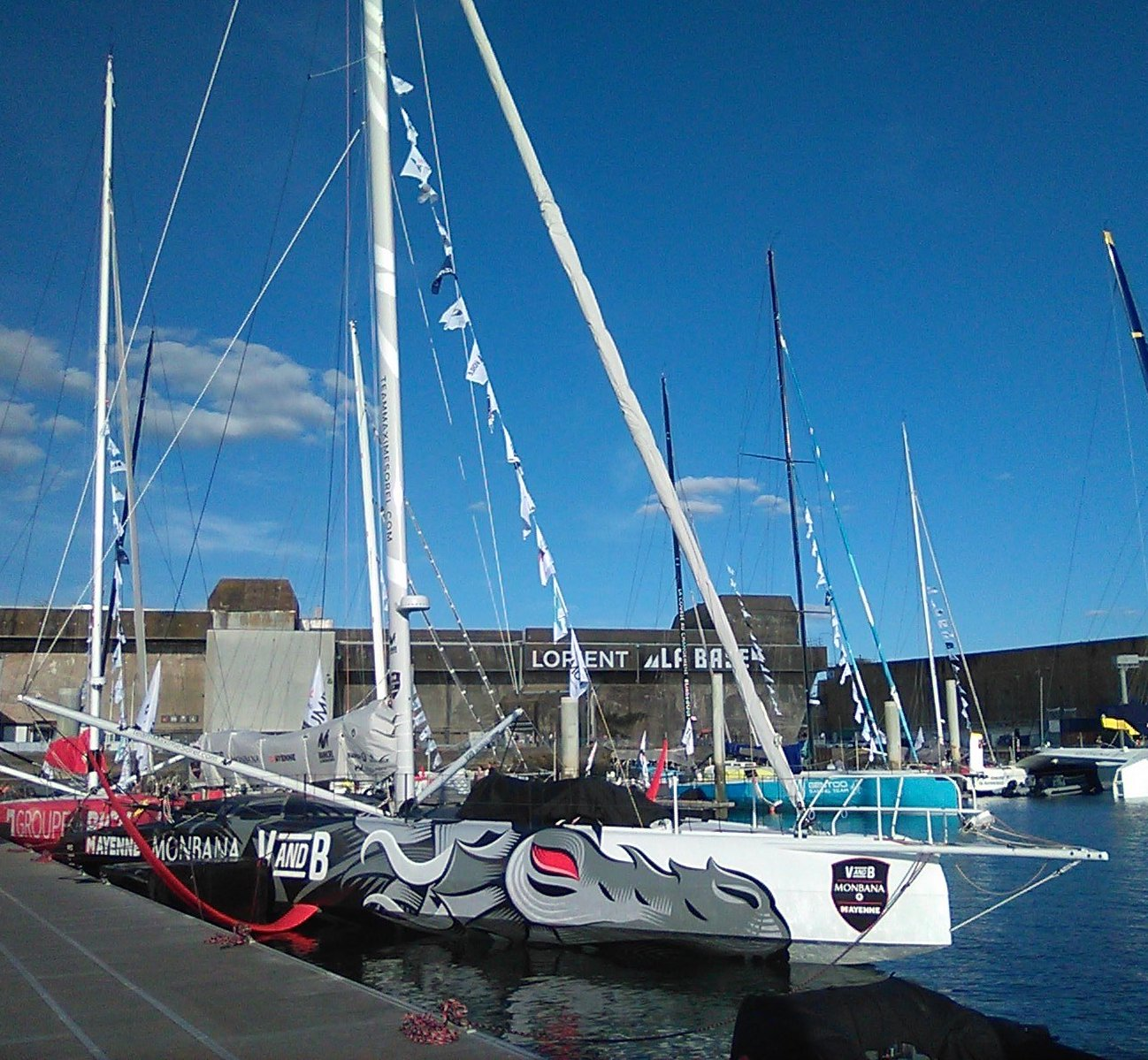

Development
- Designer: Guillaume Verdier
- Year: 2022-06-27
- Builder: Mer Concept (FRA)
- Name: V&B-Monbana-Mayenne

Hull appendages
- General: two rudders, two foils
- Keel: canting keel

Racing
- Class association: IMOCA 60

V&B Monbana Mayenne is an IMOCA 60 monohull sailing yacht, designed by Guillaume Verdier and constructed by Mer Concept (FRA) in France, launched on 27 of June 2022. It is designed for the Vendée Globe 2024, a solo tour of the world. Its skipper is the French Maxime Sorel.

== Design ==
Sistership to Apivia 1, it was built by Mer Concept, the sailing team and company of Francois Gabart which also manages the IMOCA campaign of Charlie Dalin.

== Racing results ==
Pos	Year	Race	Class	Boat name	(Co-)Skipper	Configuration, Time, Notes	Ref
Round the world races
DNF	2024	2024-2025 Vendée Globe	IMOCA 60	V&B Monbana Mayenne	Maxime Sorel (FRA)	Retired on Day 5 due to an ankle injury and damage to mainsail hook system and mainsail car	
Transatlantic Races
8	2023	Transat Jaques Vabre	IMOCA 60	V&B Monbana Mayenne	Maxime Sorel (FRA)	with Christopher Pratt (FRA) 12d 21h 23m 01s	
5	2022	Route du Rhum	IMOCA 60	V&B Monbana Mayenne	Maxime Sorel (FRA)	solo; 12d 08h 59m 42s	
Other Races
