= IMOCA 60 Biotherm =

Biotherm
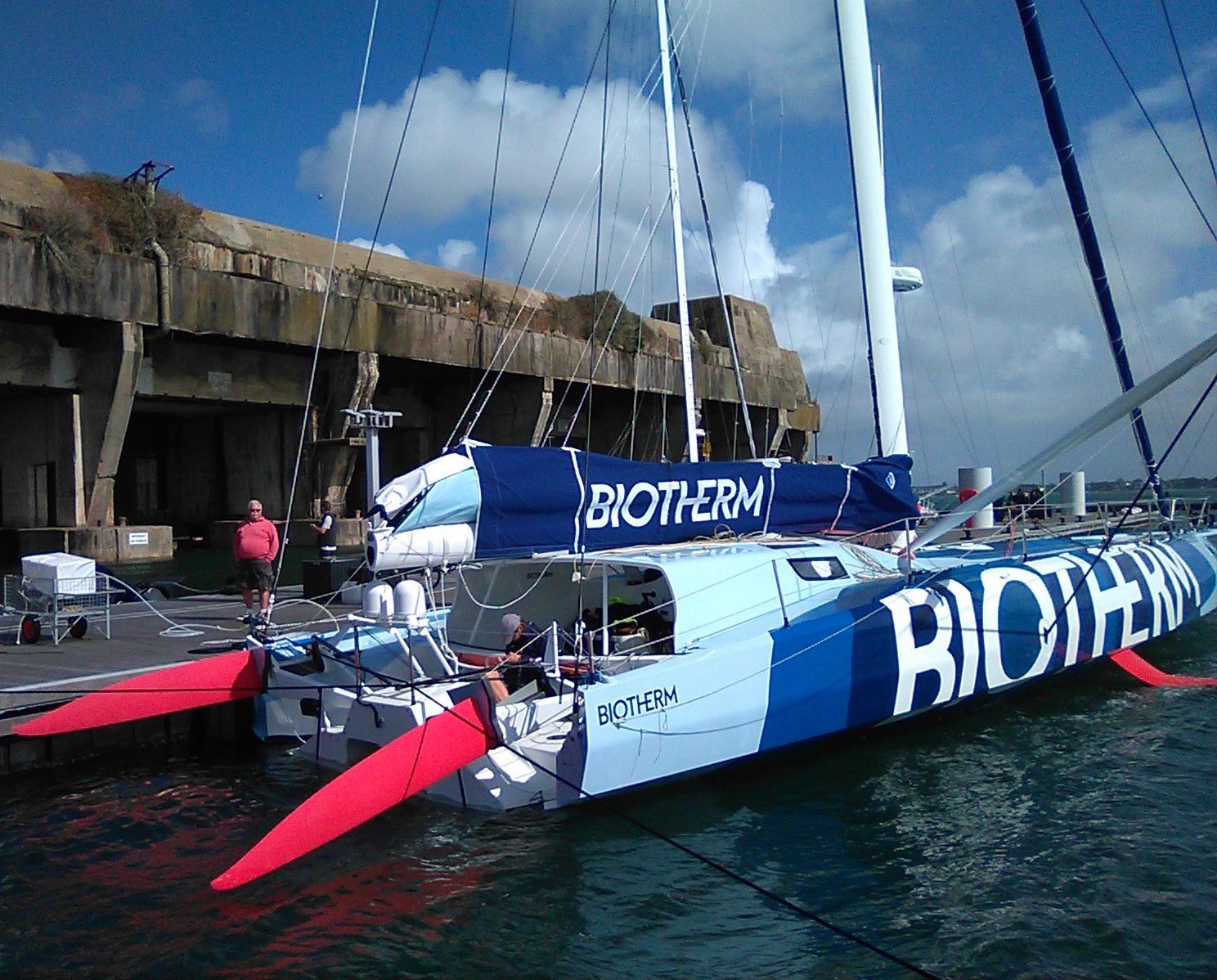

Development
- Designer: Guillaume Verdier
- Year: 31 August 2022
- Builder: Persico Marine (ITA)
- Name: Biotherm

Hull appendages
- General: two rudders, two foils
- Keel: canting keel

Racing
- Class association: IMOCA 60

Biotherm is an IMOCA 60 monohull sailing yacht, designed by Guillaume Verdier and constructed by Persico Marine in Italy, launched on 31 August 2022. It is designed for the Vendée Globe 2024, a solo round the world yacht race. Its skipper is the French sailor Paul Meilhat.

== Design ==
The design is built on Thomas Ruyants yacht LinkedOut with a few changes. It is designed to be very light.

== Racing results ==
Pos	Year	Race	Class	Boat name	(Co-)Skipper	Configuration, Time, Notes	Ref
Round the world races
4	2013	The Ocean Race	IMOCA 60	Biotherm	Paul Meilhat (FRA)	crewed	
Transatlantic Races
6	2022	Route de Rhum	IMOCA 60	Biotherm	Paul Meilhat (FRA)	solo	
Other Races
20	2023	24h Le Defi Azimut	IMOCA 60	Biotherm	Paul Meilhat (FRA) Mariana Lobato (POR)	double handed	

== See also ==
- Paul Meilhat (skipper)
