= Xu Jingkun =

Chinese Disabled Offshore yachtsman

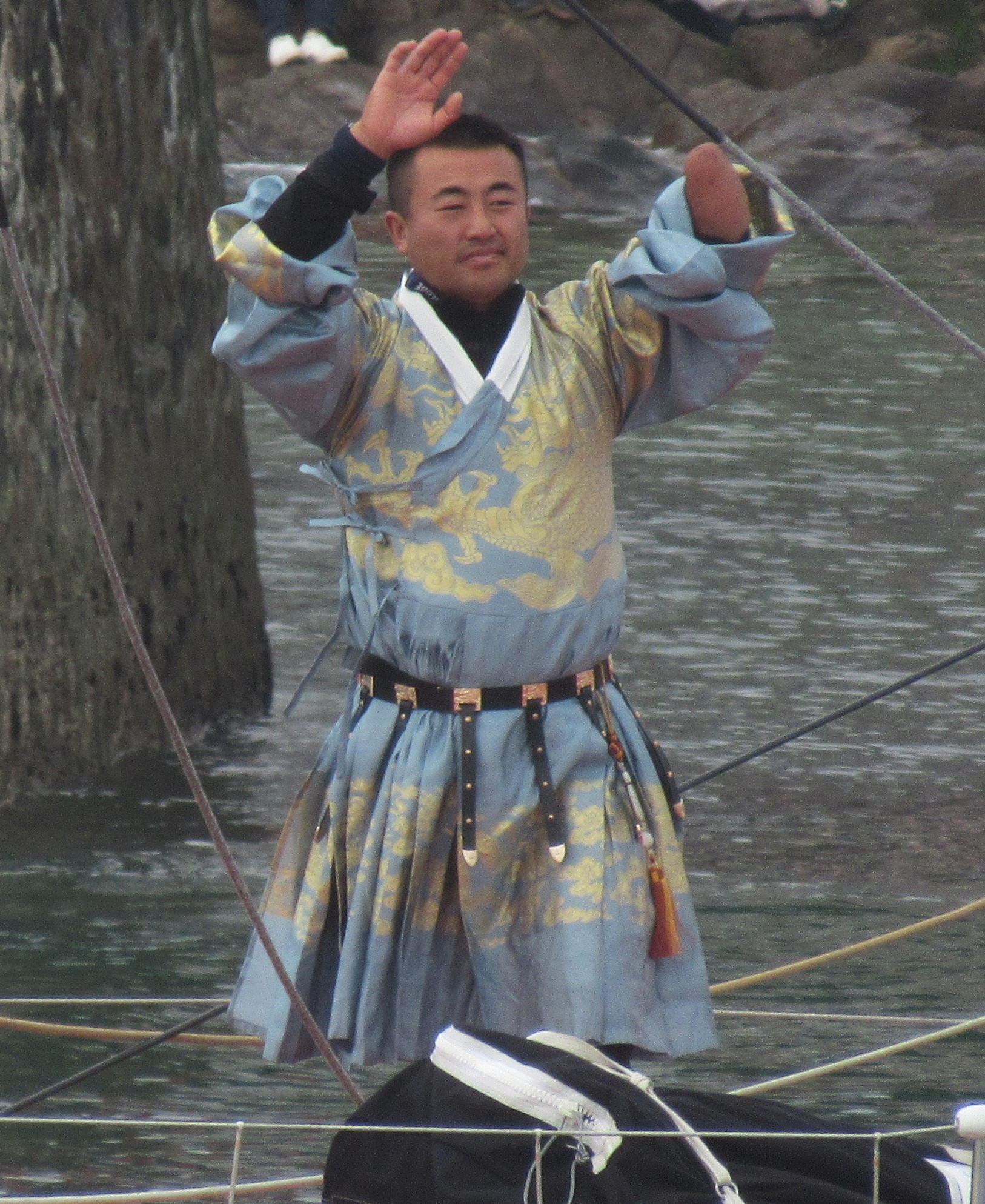
- Start of 2024 Vendee
- Born: 9 September 1989 (age 36); Pingdu, Shandong Province
- Occupation: Offshore Sailor

Xu Jingkun (Chinese: 徐京坤; born 9 November 1989) is a Chinese professional offshore sailor. He has no lower left arm which was lost as a result of a fireworks accident.

== Racing results ==
Pos	Year	Race	Class	Boat name	Notes	Ref
Round the world races
30 / 40	2024/25	2024-2025 Vendée Globe	IMOCA 60	Singchain Team Haikou	100th skipper to finish the Vendée Globe	
Transatlantic Races
26 / 28	2024	Transat New York Vendée	IMOCA 60	Singchain Team Haikou		
31 / 32	2023	Retour à la base (Transat B to B)	IMOCA 60	Singchain Team Haikou		
26 / 28	2023	2023 Transat Jacques Vabre	IMOCA 60	Singchain Team Haikou	with Mike Golding (GBR)	
29/38	2022	2022 Route du Rhum	IMOCA 60	China Dream Haikou		
37/46	2015	Mini Transat	Mini Transat 6.50 - China Dream		Pogo 2 Design	
Other Races
4	2017	Hansa 303 World Championship				

== Gallery ==
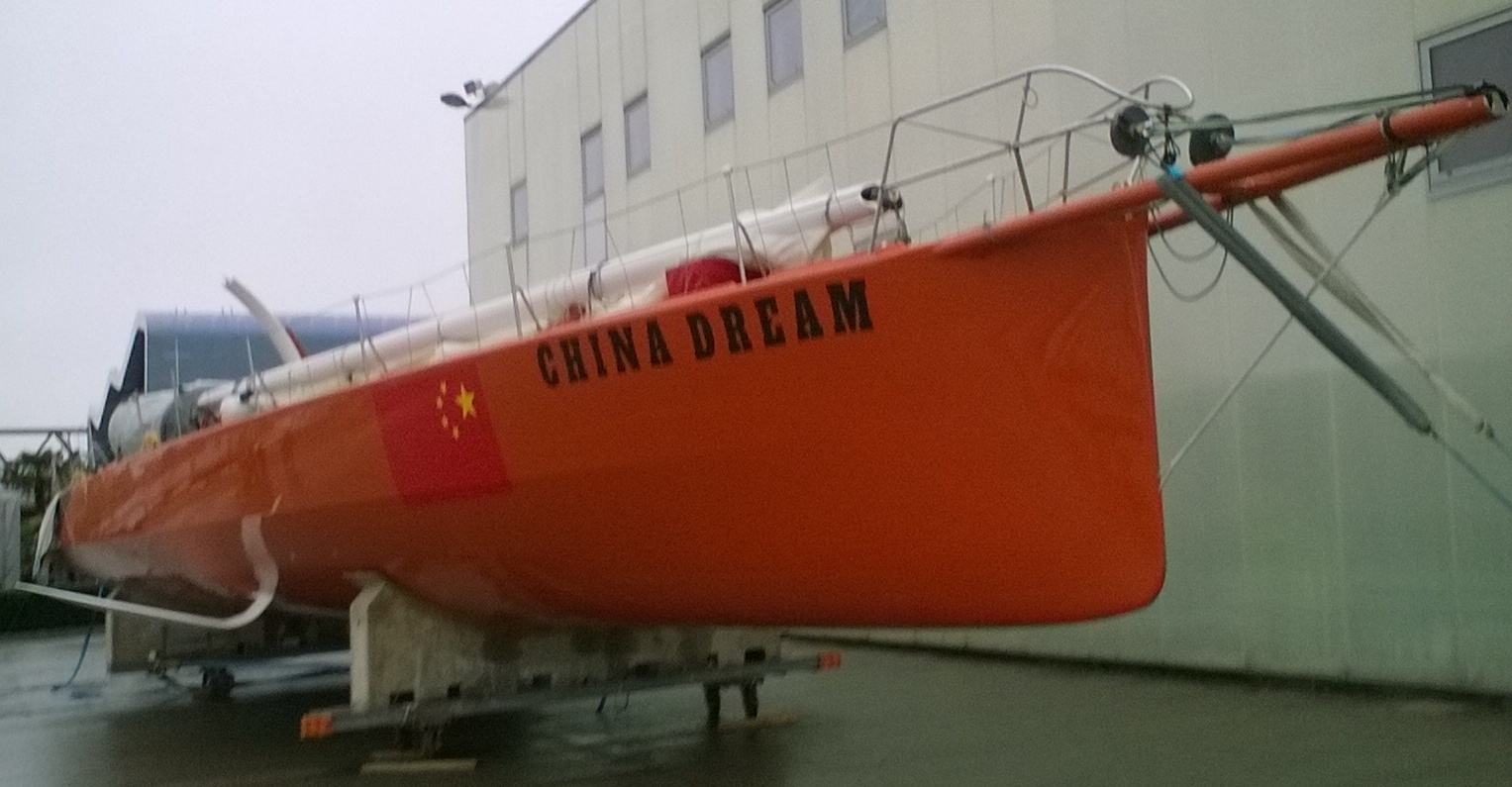

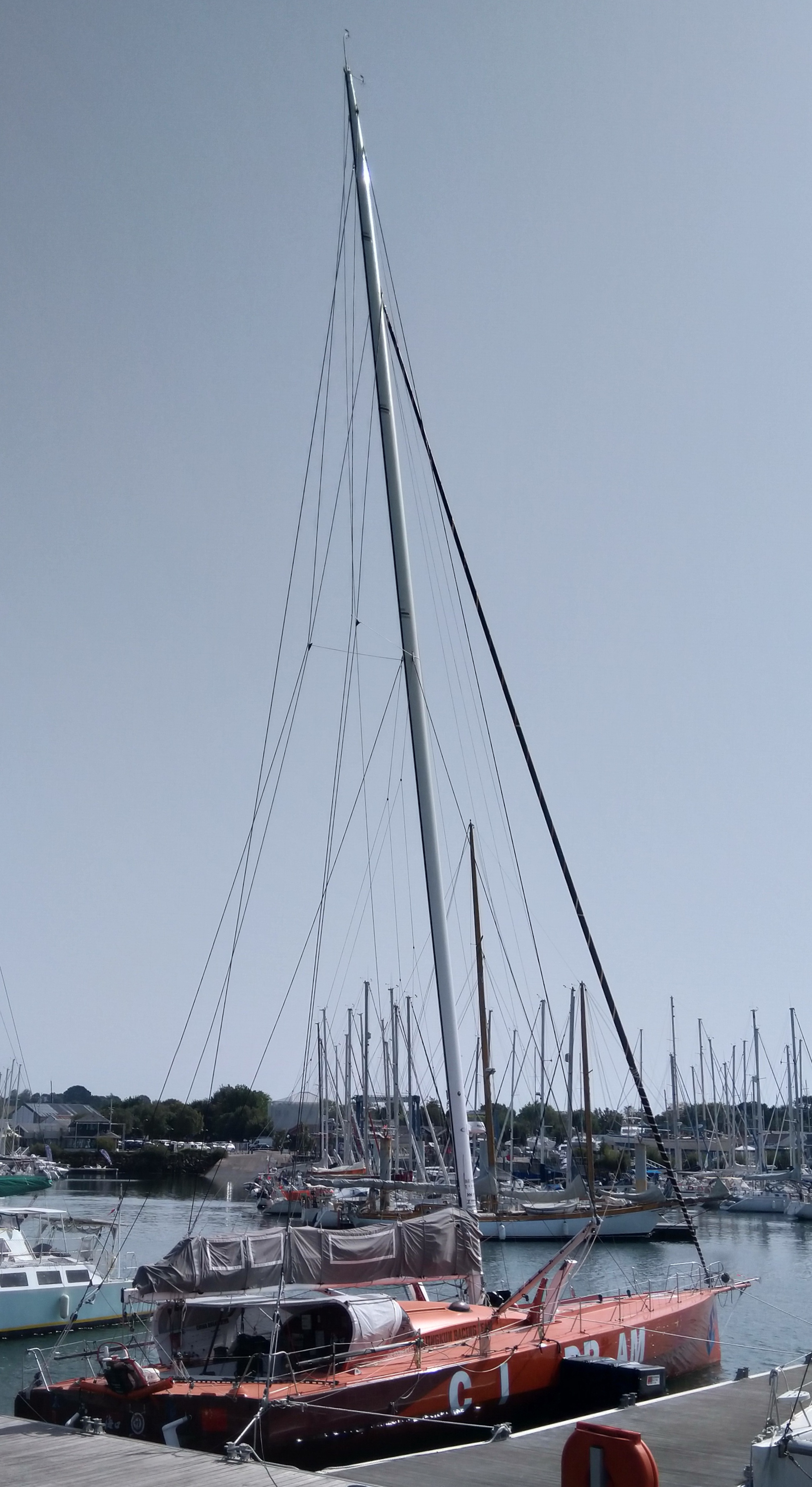

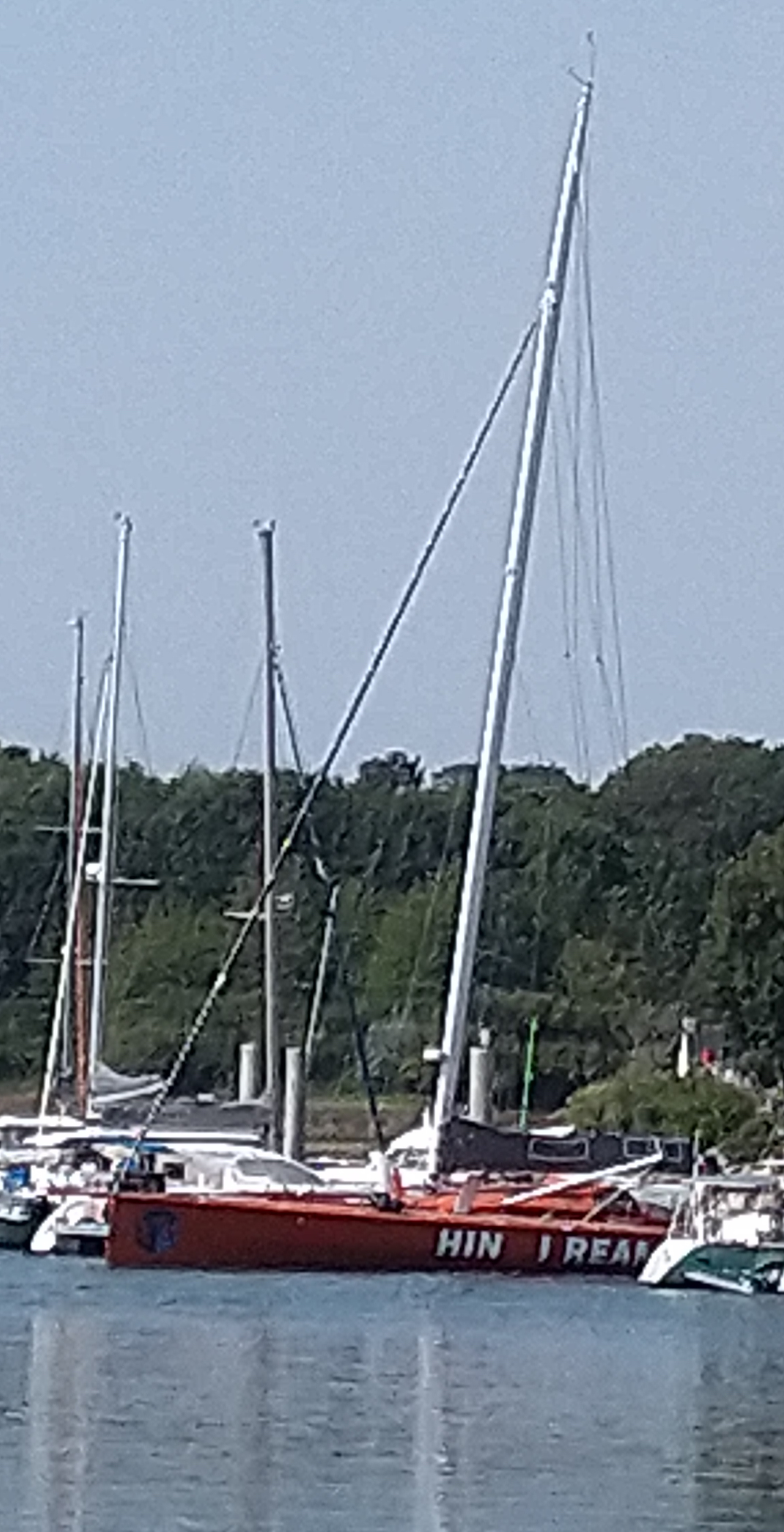
