= IMOCA 60 Stand As One =

Stand As One - Altavia
Development
- Designer: David Raison
- Year: 2023-06-17
- Builder: Persico Marine (ITA)
- Name: Stand As One - Altavia

Hull appendages
- General: two rudders, two foils
- Keel: canting keel

Racing
- Class association: IMOCA 60

Stand As One - Altavia is an IMOCA 60 monohull sailing yacht, designed by David Raison and constructed by Persico Marine in Italy, launched on 17th of June 2023. It is designed for the Vendée Globe 2024, a solo round the world yacht race. Its skipper is the French sailor Éric Bellion.

== Design ==
The IMOCA 60 Stand As One has no hydrofoils. It is sistership to Tout commence en Finistère - Armor-lux.

== Racing results ==
Pos	Year	Race	Class	Boat name	(Co-)Skipper	Configuration, Time, Notes	Ref
Transatlantic Races
DNF	2023	Transat Jaques Vabre	IMOCA 60	Stand As One	Eric Bellion (FRA)	with Martin Le Pape (FRA)	
