= Sébastien Marsset =

French offshore yachtsman

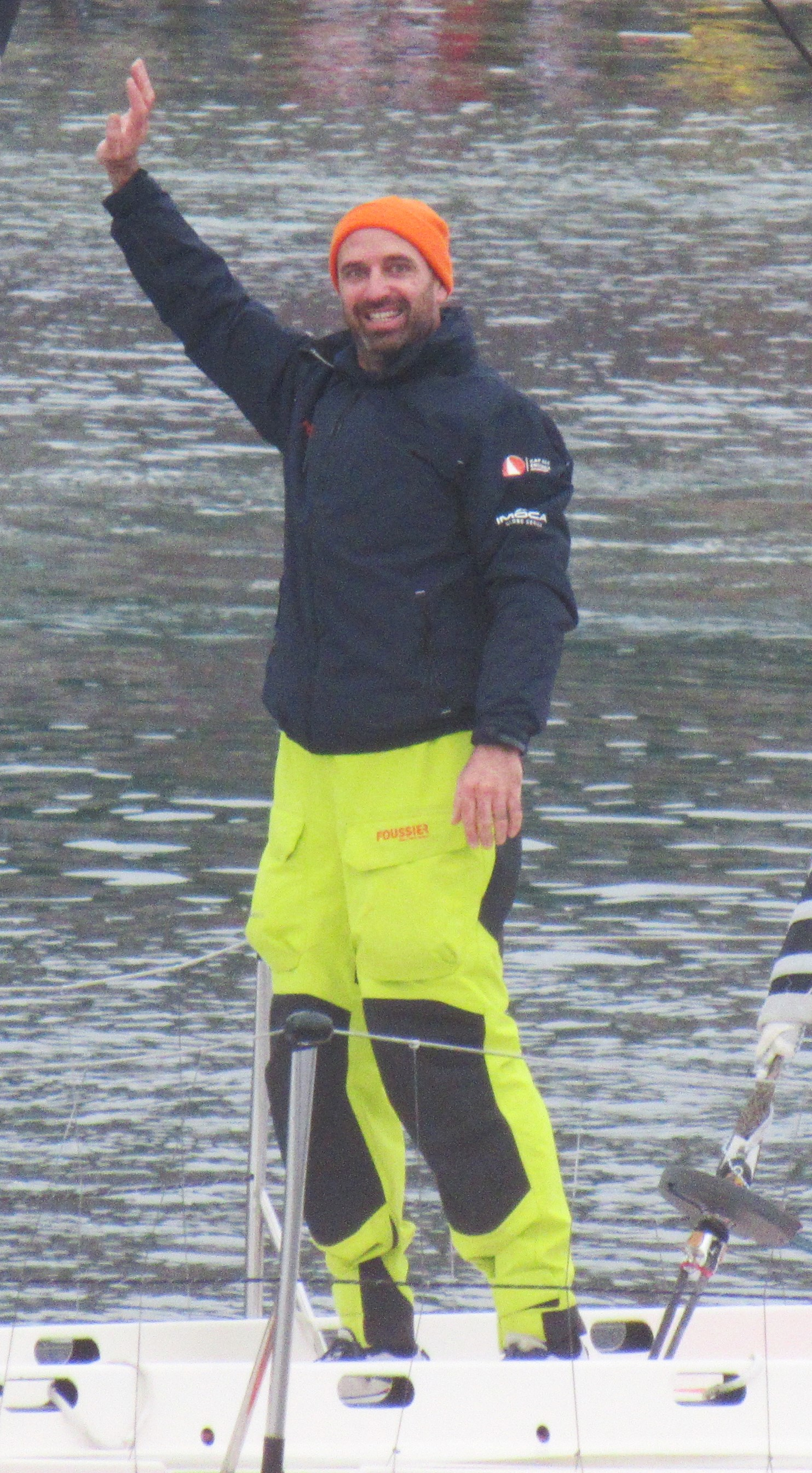
- At the start of the 2024-2025 Vendée Globe

Personal information
- Nationality: French
- Born: 15 December 1984 (age 41)
- Occupation: Offshore Sailor

Sébastien Marsset born 15 December 1984 is a French professional offshore sailor. He was a shore crew member and reserve sailor for Frank Cammas 2011-2012 Volvo Ocean Race with Groupama, before competing in the next addition. He started off shorthanded offshore sailing in the Mini Class and progressed to class 40 achieving the following:

== Results ==
Pos	Year	Race	Class	Boat name	Time	Notes	Ref
Round the world races
TBC / 40	2024/25	2024-2025 Vendée Globe	IMOCA 60	Foussier - Mon courtier énergie			
Failed	2016	Jules Verne Attempt	Maxi Tri	Spindrift 2	47d 10h	Crew of 12 did it 2 days outside the record	
5 / 7	2014/15	2014–2015 Volvo Ocean Race	Volvo Ocean 60	Team Alvimedica		Skipper by Charlie Enright	
Transatlantic Races
24 / 32	2024	The Transat CIC	IMOCA 60	Foussier-Mon Courtier Energie, FRA 83			
35 / DNF	2024	Return a la base	IMOCA 60	Foussier-Mon Courtier Energie, FRA 83			
27 / 40	2023	Transat Jacques Vabre	IMOCA 60	Foussier-Mon Courtier Energie, FRA 83	16d 13h 43m 30s	with Sophie Faguet (FRA)	
11 / 38	2022	2022 Route du Rhum	IMOCA 60	Mon Courtier Energie: Cap Agir Ensemble, FRA 83		13d 08h 36m 55s	
Other Races
