= Oliver Heer =

Swiss Offshore yachtsman

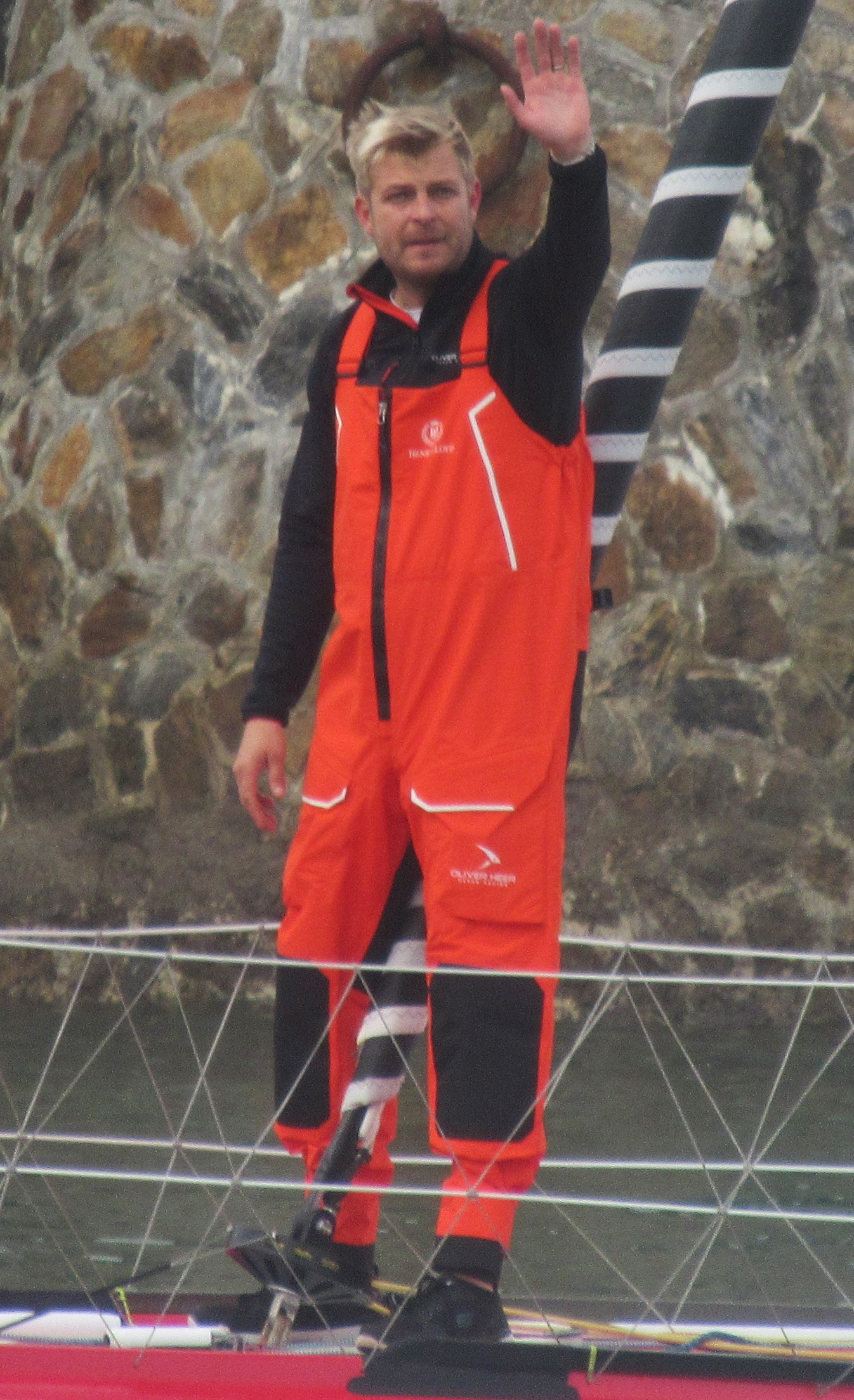
- At the start of the 2024-2025 Vendée Globe

Personal information
- Nationality: Swiss, German
- Born: 10 May 1988 (age 38) Zurich, Switzerland
- Occupation: Offshore Sailor

Sailing career
- Sport: Sailing

Oliver Heer born 10 May 1988 is a Swiss professional offshore sailor. After starting working in the corporate world he left to pursue a career in sailing in 2018 he joined Alex Thomson Racing sailing aboard IMOCA 60 Hugo Boss 6.

== Oceanic/Offshore Sailing ==
Pos	Year	Race	Class	Boat name	Time	Notes	Ref
Round the world races
29 / 40	2024/25	2024-2025 Vendée Globe	IMOCA 60	Oliver Heer Ocean Racing, SUI 49	99d 05h 27min 34s		
Transatlantic Races
24 / 28	2024	Transat New York Vendée	IMOCA 60	Oliver Heer Ocean Racing, SUI 49	15d 00h 01min 02s		
DNF / 40	2023	Transat Jacques Vabre	IMOCA 60	Oliver Heer Ocean Racing, SUI 49	DNF	with David Ledroit (SUI)	
32 / 38	2023	2022 Route du Rhum	IMOCA 60	Ollie Heer Ocean Racing,SUI 49	17d 00h 22m 55s		
Major Offshore Races
10 / 13	2023	Rolex Fastnet Race	IMOCA 60	Hugo Boss (6),GBR		with Alex Thomson (GBR)	
