= IMOCA 60 11th Hour =

IMOCA 60 Class Sailboat from 2021

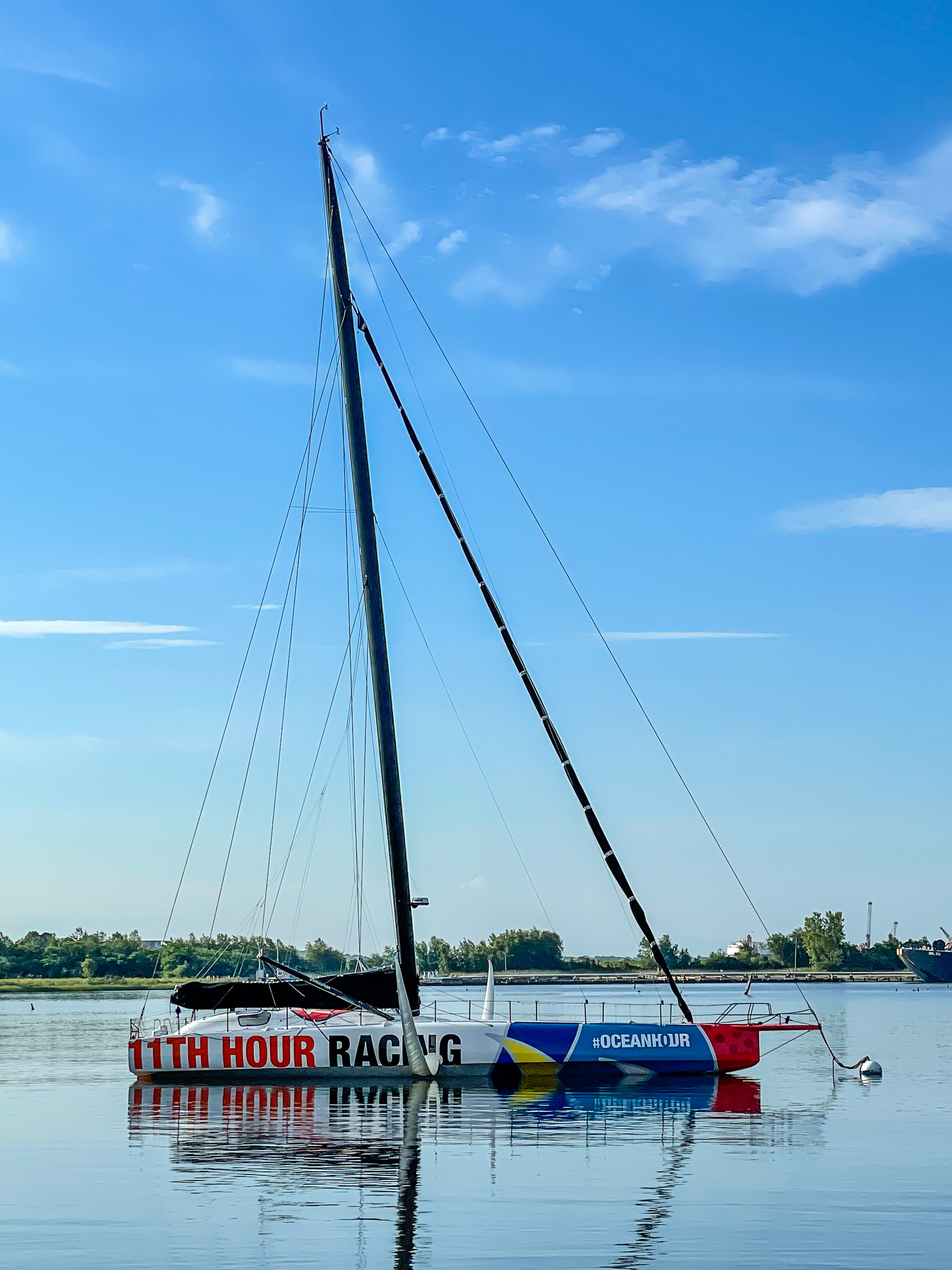

Development
- Designer: Guillaume Verdier
- Year: 2021
- Builder: CDK Technologies

Racing
- Class association: IMOCA 60

The IMOCA 60 Groupe Dubreuil previous known as 11th Hour Racing - Mālama.

== Built ==
It was designed by Verdier Design Team headed by Guillaume Verdier and launched in 2021, after being built by CDK Technologies in France. The boat was extensively optimised for its environmental impact, with detailed studies into its construction waste and carbon footprint.

== Campaigns ==
=== 2023 Ocean Race - 11th Hour Racing ===
The boat was commissioned for The Ocean Race team 11th Hour Racing - Mālama who successfully won the 2023 Edition of The Ocean Race.

The campaign also used the IMOCA 60 11th Hour Racing Team – Alaka’i as a training boat.

=== 2024-2025 Vendée Globe - Groupe Dubreuil ===
The boat was sold to Sébastien Simon for his campaign.

== Racing results ==
Pos	Year	Race	Class	Boat name	(Co-)Skipper	Configuration, Time, Notes	Ref
Round the world races
3	2024	2024-2025 Vendee Globe	IMOCA 60	FRA 112 - Groupe Dubreuil	Sébastien Simon (FRA)	67d 12h 25m 37s	
1	2023	The Ocean Race	IMOCA 60	11th Hour Racing - Mālama	Charlie Enright (USA)	Crewed first overall and in in-port-series	
Transatlantic Races
10	2024	The Transat	IMOCA 60	Groupe Dubreuil	Sébastien Simon (FRA)	9d 20h 02m 35s	
13	2021	Transat Jacques-Vabre	IMOCA 60	11th Hour Racing - Mālama	Charlie Enright (USA) Pascal Bidégorry (FRA)	21d 13h 37m 20s	
Other Races
1	2022	48h Le Défi Azimut	IMOCA 60	11th Hour Racing - Mālama	Charlie Enright (USA)	crewed trials	
