= IMOCA 60 Hugo Boss 6 =

IMOCA 60 Racing Yacht

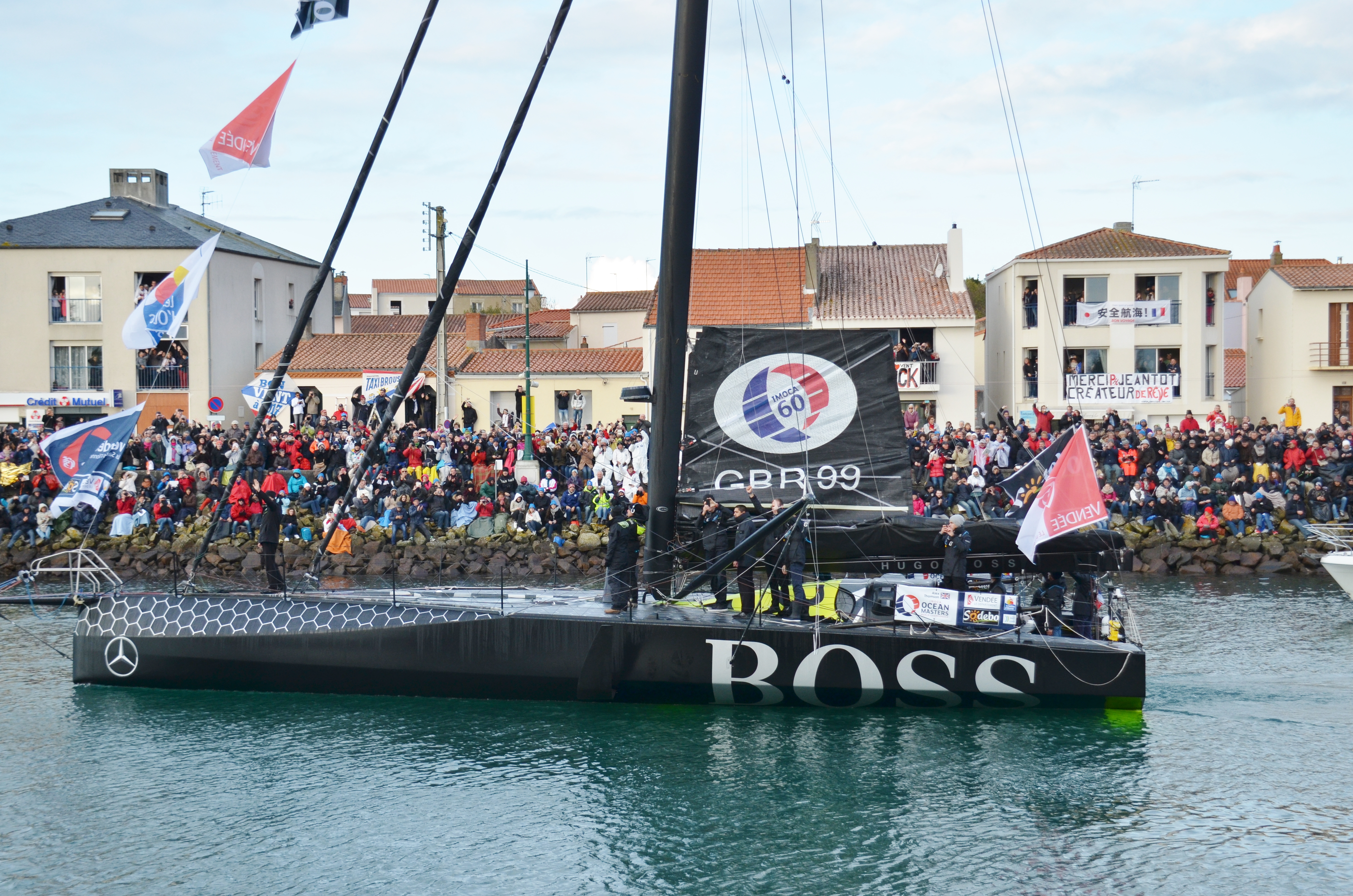

Development
- Designer: VPLP Design, Guillaume Verdier
- Year: 4 September 2015
- Builder: Green Marine Boatbuilders

Hull
- Hull weight: Carbon Sandwich

Racing
- Class association: IMOCA 60

The IMOCA 60 class yacht Hugo Boss 6 was designed by VPLP, Guillaume Verdier and Alex Thomson Racing and launched in 2015 after being built by Green Marine based in Hythe, England.

== Names and ownership ==
Hugo Boss 6 (2015-2020)

- Skipper: Alex Thomson
- Campaigning for the 2016–2017 Vendée Globe

11th Hour Racing-Alaka'i (2020-2022)

- Skipper: Charlie Enright
- Training boat for 2023 The Ocean Race

Guyot Environment (since 2022)

- Skipper: Benjamin Dutreux
- Sail No.: FRA 09
- Campaigning for the 2024-2025 Vendée Globe

== Racing results ==
Pos	Year	Race	Class	Boat name	Skipper	Notes	Ref
Round the world races
10 / 40	2025	2024–2025 Vendée Globe	IMOCA 60	GUYOT ENVIRONNEMENT	Benjamin Dutreux (FRA)		
-	2023	2023 The Ocean Race	IMOCA 60	GUYOT ENVIRONNEMENT	Benjamin Dutreux (FRA); Robert Stanjek (GER) +Crew		
2	2016	2016–2017 Vendée Globe	IMOCA 60	Hugo Boss 6	Alex Thomson (GBR)	74d 19h 35m 15s	
Transatlantic Races
DNF	2021	Transat Jacques Vabre	IMOCA 60	11th Hour Racing-Alaka'i	Simon Fisher (GBR); Justine Mettraux (SUI)	Dismasted	
4 / 29	2019	Transat Jacques Vabre	IMOCA 60	11th Hour Racing - US 2300	Charlie Enright (USA); Pascal Bidegorry (FRA)	14d 06h 10m	
DNF	2015	Transat Jacques Vabre	IMOCA 60	Hugo Boss 6	Alex Thomson (GBR); Guillermo Altadill (ESP)		
Other Races
