= Justine Mettraux =

Swiss offshore sailor

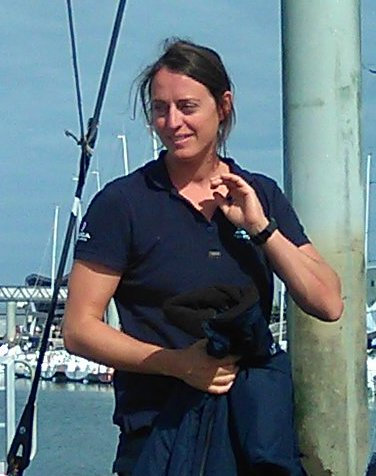
- Justine Mettraux au Défi Azimut 2022.

Personal information
- Nationality: Swiss
- Born: 4 October 1986 (age 39) Genève, Switzerland

Sport

Sailing career
- Class(es): IMOCA 60; Beneteau Figaro 2
- Club: Club Nautique du Rohu

Justine Mettraux (born 4 October 1986) is a Swiss professional sailor. She is an offshore sailor having competed extensively in the Figaro class before progressing to the IMOCA 60. In the 2024–2025 Vendée Globe race she set the record for the fastest single-handed, non-stop, monohull circumnavigation by a woman, with a time of 76 days, 1 hour and 36 minutes.

== Results highlights ==
Results History
Year	Pos	Race	Class	Boat name	Note	Ref.
Round the world races
2024	8 / 40	2024–2025 Vendée Globe	IMOCA 60	Teamwork.net		
2023	1	2023 The Ocean Race	IMOCA 60	11th Hour Racing-Mālama		
2014	6	2014-2015 Volvo Ocean Race	Volvo Ocean 65	Team SCA		
Transatlantic Races
2023	6	2023 Transat Jacques Vabre	IMOCA 60	Teamwork.net	with Julien Villion (FRA)	
2022	7	2022 Route du Rhum	IMOCA 60	Teamwork		
2021	RET	2021 Transat Jacques Vabre	IMOCA 60	11th Hour Racing-Alaka'i	with Simon Fisher (GBR); Dismasted	
2018	10	Transat AG2R	Beneteau Figaro 2	Teamwork	with Isabelle Joschke (FRA)	
2017	4	2017 Transat Jacques Vabre	Class 40	FRA 115 - Teamwork 40	with Bertrand Delesne (FRA)	
Others
