= Guirec Soudée =

French offshore yachtsman

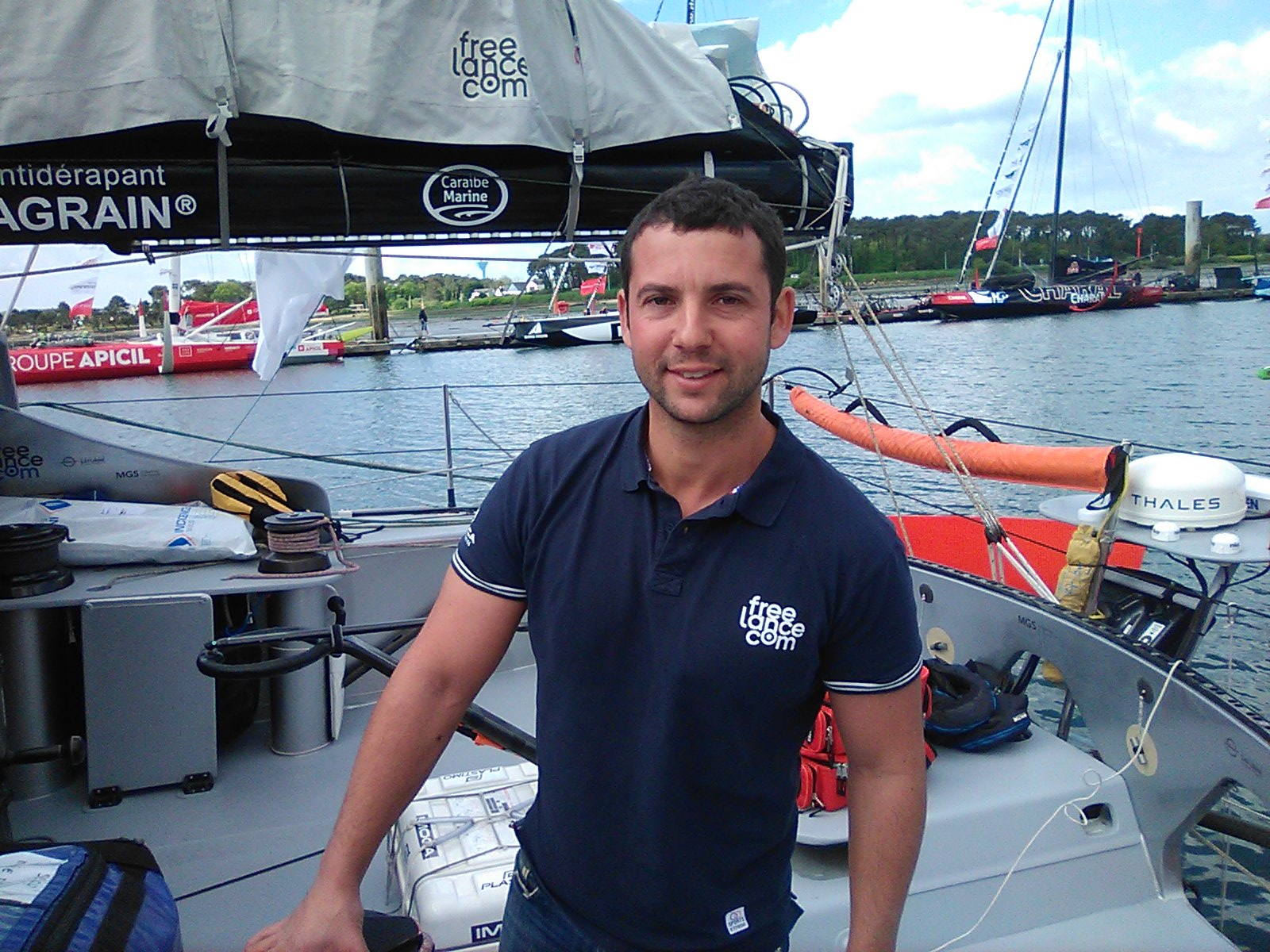
- In Lorient, before the departure of The Transat 2024

Personal information
- Nationality: French
- Born: 3 January 1992 (age 34)
- Occupation: Offshore Sailor

Sailing career
- Sport: Sailing

Guirec Soudée (born 3 January 1992) is a French professional offshore sailor.

== Significant Race Results ==
Pos	Year	Race	Class	Boat name	Time	Notes	Ref
Round the world races
23 / 40	2024/25	2024-2025 Vendée Globe	IMOCA 60	Freelance.com			
Transatlantic Races
17 / 22	2024	The Transat	IMOCA 60	Freelance.com	10d 19h 8m 2s		
24 / 32	2023	Retour à la base	IMOCA 60	Freelance.com, FRA 22	12d 9h 17m 45s		
20 / 40	2023	Transat Jacques Vabre	IMOCA 60	Freelance.com	14d 11h 32m 55s	with Roland Jourdain	
25 / 38	2022	2022 Route du Rhum	IMOCA 60	Freelance.com	14d 18h 28m 48s		
Other Races
20 / 29	2023	Rolex Fastnet Race	IMOCA 60	Freelance.com		with Lucie Quéruel	
