= IMOCA 60 Hugo Boss 7 =

IMOCA 60 Racing Yacht

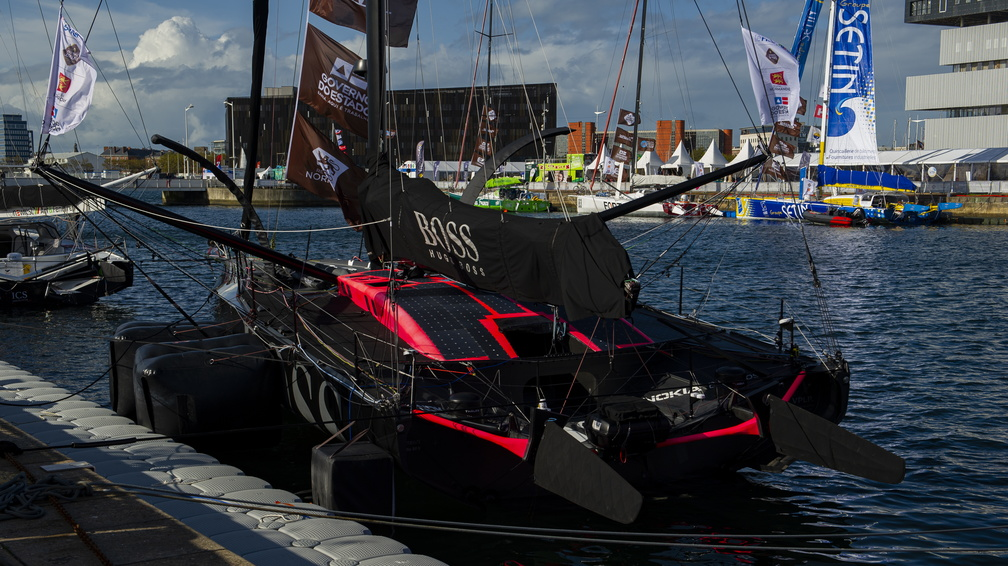

Development
- Designer: VPLP Design
- Year: 4 August 2019
- Builder: Carrington Boats Ltd

Boat
- Draft: 4.50 metres (14.8 ft)

Hull
- Hull weight: Carbon Sandwich
- LOH: 18.28 metres (60.0 ft)
- Beam: 5.40 metres (17.7 ft)

Hull appendages
- Keel: Canting Keel
- Rudder: Twin Rudders

Rig
- Rig type: Rotating Mast with Deck Spreaders

Racing
- Class association: IMOCA 60

The IMOCA 60 class yacht Hugo Boss 7 was designed by VPLP, Alex Thompson Racing and Gurit and launched in August 2019 after being built by Carrington Boats based in Hythe, England. The boat contained a number of innovative features and was the first IMOCA to have a fully enclosed cockpit. The hull form was also optimised for the semi-foiling nature of the class.

== Names and ownership ==
Hugo Boss 7 (2019-2021)

- Skipper: Alex Thomson
- Sail No.: GBR 99

Construction of the boat started under the name Rockliffe Bill III

Hublot (since 2021)

- Skipper: Alan Roura
- Sail No.: SUI 7

== Racing results ==
Pos	Year	Race	Class	Boat name	Skipper	Notes	Ref
Round the world races
RET	2020	2020–2021 Vendée Globe	IMOCA 60	Hugo Boss 7	Alex Thomson (GBR)	Day 21: rudder damage, diverted to and retired unaided to Cape Town	
Transatlantic Races
DNF	2019	Transat Jacques Vabre	IMOCA 60	Hugo Boss 7	Alex Thomson (GBR); Neal McDonald (GBR)		
Other Races
10 / 12	2021	Fastnet Race	IMOCA 60	Hugo Boss 7	Alex Thomson (GBR); Oliver Heer (SUI)	3d 01h 21m	
