= IMOCA 60 For People =

For People
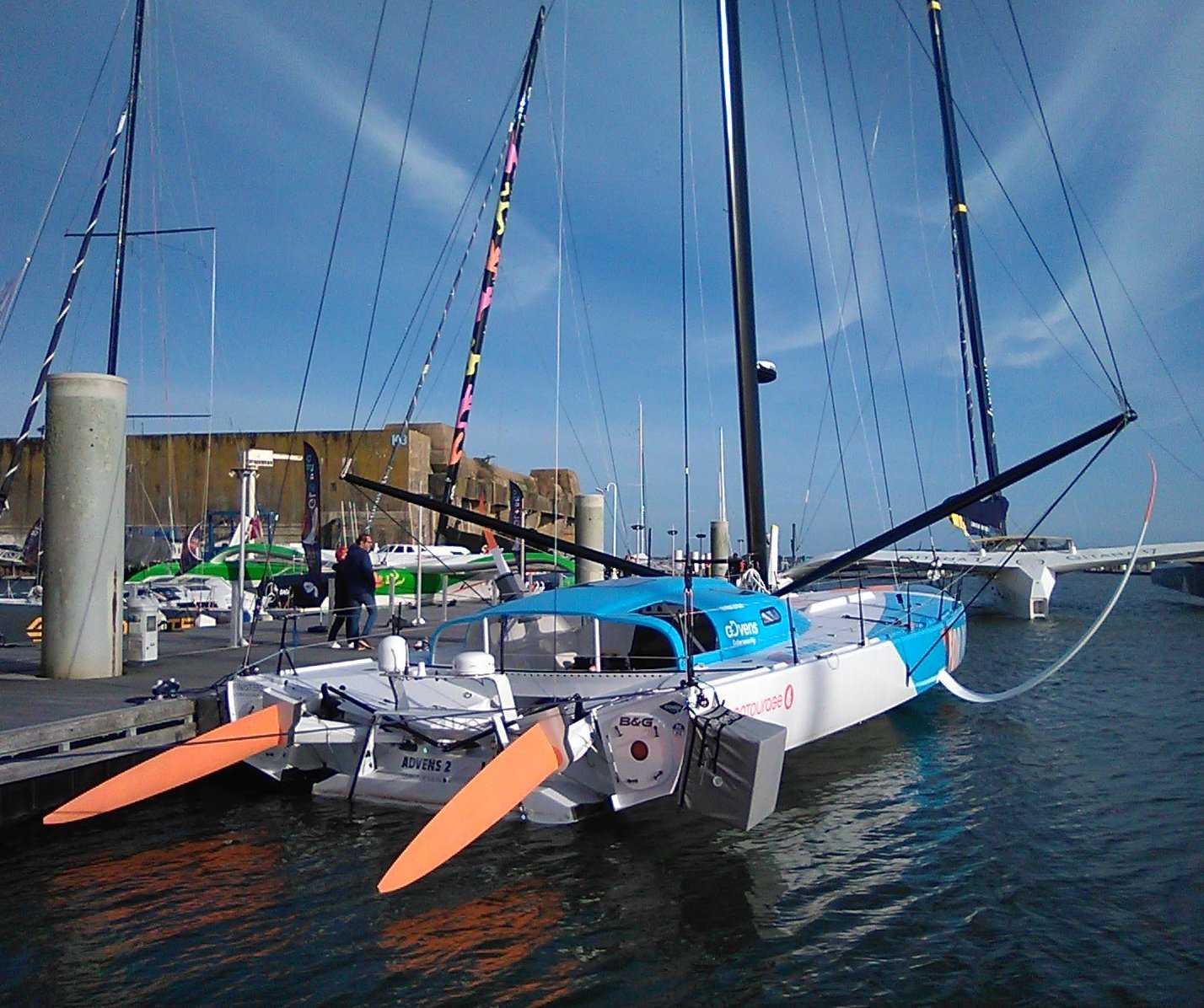

Development
- Designer: Antoine Koch / Finot-Conq
- Year: 2023-03-16
- Builder: CDK Technologies
- Name: For People

Hull appendages
- General: two rudders, two foils
- Keel: canting keel

Racing
- Class association: IMOCA 60

For People is an IMOCA 60 monohull sailing yacht, designed by Antoine Koch in cooperation with Finot-Conq, constructed by CDK Technologies in France, and launched on 16 March 2023. It is designed for the Vendée Globe 2024, a non-stop round-the-world solo race. It is skippered by the French offshore sailor Thomas Ruyant.

In 2025 it was sold to be skippered by Ambrogio Beccaria.

== Design ==
It is a sister ship to Paprec Arkéa and, similarly to that yacht, features a fully enclosed cockpit with a shock absorbing seat. The hull is optimized for the downwind conditions of the southern ocean, but has a slim design.

== Racing results ==
| Pos | Year | Race | Class | Boat name | (Co-)Skipper | Configuration, Time, Notes | Ref |
Round the world races
| 7 | 2024 | Vendée Globe | IMOCA 60 | Vulnerable | Thomas Ruyant (FRA) | | |
Transatlantic Races
| 5 | 2024 | New York Vendée | IMOCA 60 | Vulnerable | Thomas Ruyant (FRA) | | |
| 17 | 2023 | Retour à la base | IMOCA 60 | For People | Thomas Ruyant (FRA) | solo; 11d 15h 59m 46s | |
| 1 | 2023 | Transat Jaques Vabre | IMOCA 60 | For People | Thomas Ruyant (FRA) | with Morgan Lagraviere (FRA); 11d 21h 32m 31s | |
Other Races

== See also ==
- Thomas Ruyant (skipper)
