= Éric Bellion =

French offshore sailor and navigator

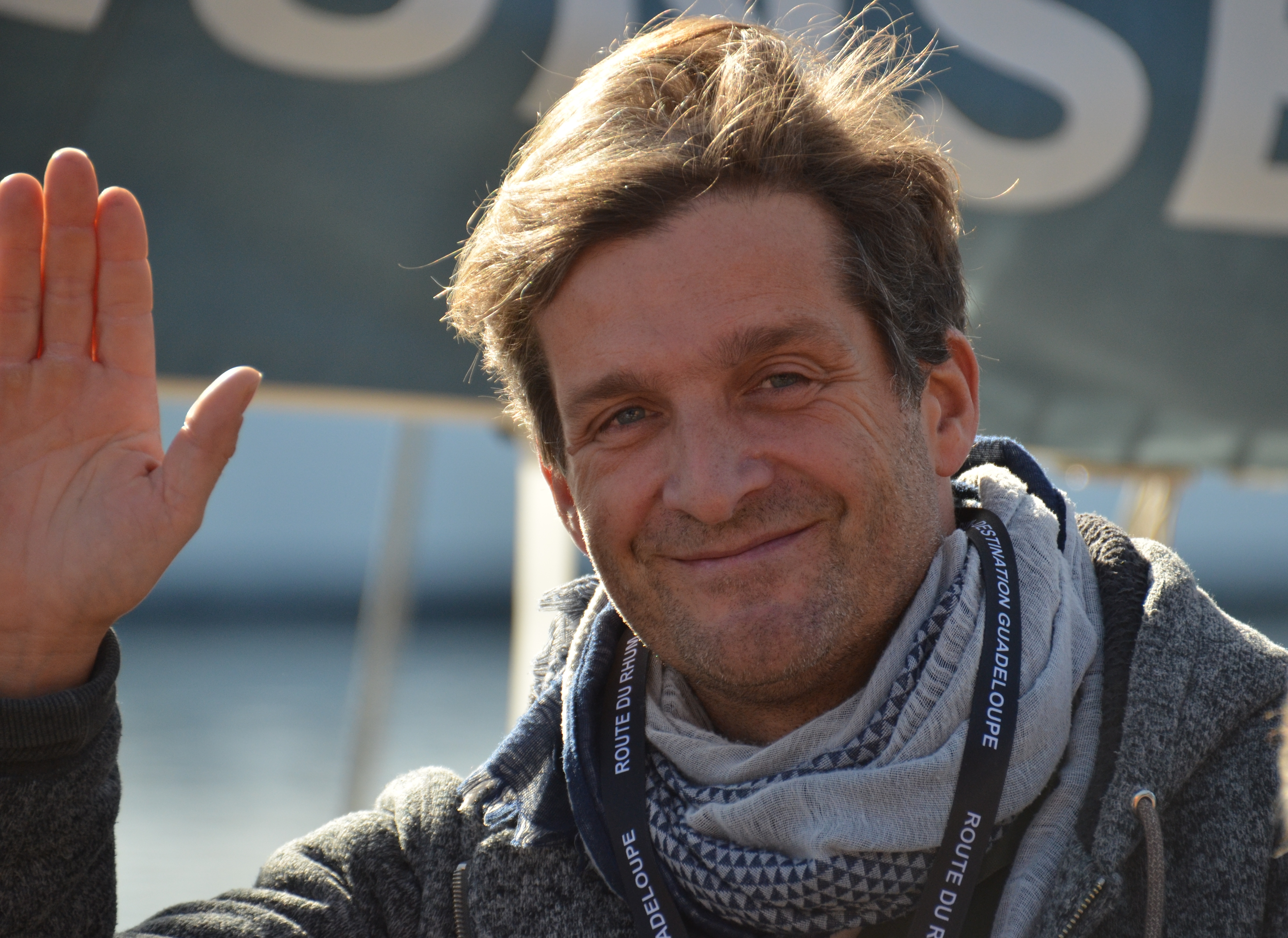

Personal information
- Nationality: French
- Born: 15 March 1976 (age 50) Versailles, Yvelines, France

Sailing career
- Sport: Sailing

Éric Bellion (born 15 March 1976 in Versailles, Yvelines) is a French offshore sailor.

He is a teacher and mentor in management, specialising in the handicapped and diversity, and a communications consultant and also a charitable donor. He is a graduate of the Emlyon Business School and the Copenhagen Business School.

A keen sailor at the age of 26, Eric with two friends sailed around the world via the three capes on a small 8.60m boat in the Kifouine Challenge, which was followed by two other projects: the Integration Challenge between 2007 and 2010 and Team Jolokia after that.

He finished 9th in the 2016-2017 Vendee Globe and was the first none professional sailor. He produced a documentary film released in 2019 of his Vendee Globe voyage called "Comme un seul homme".

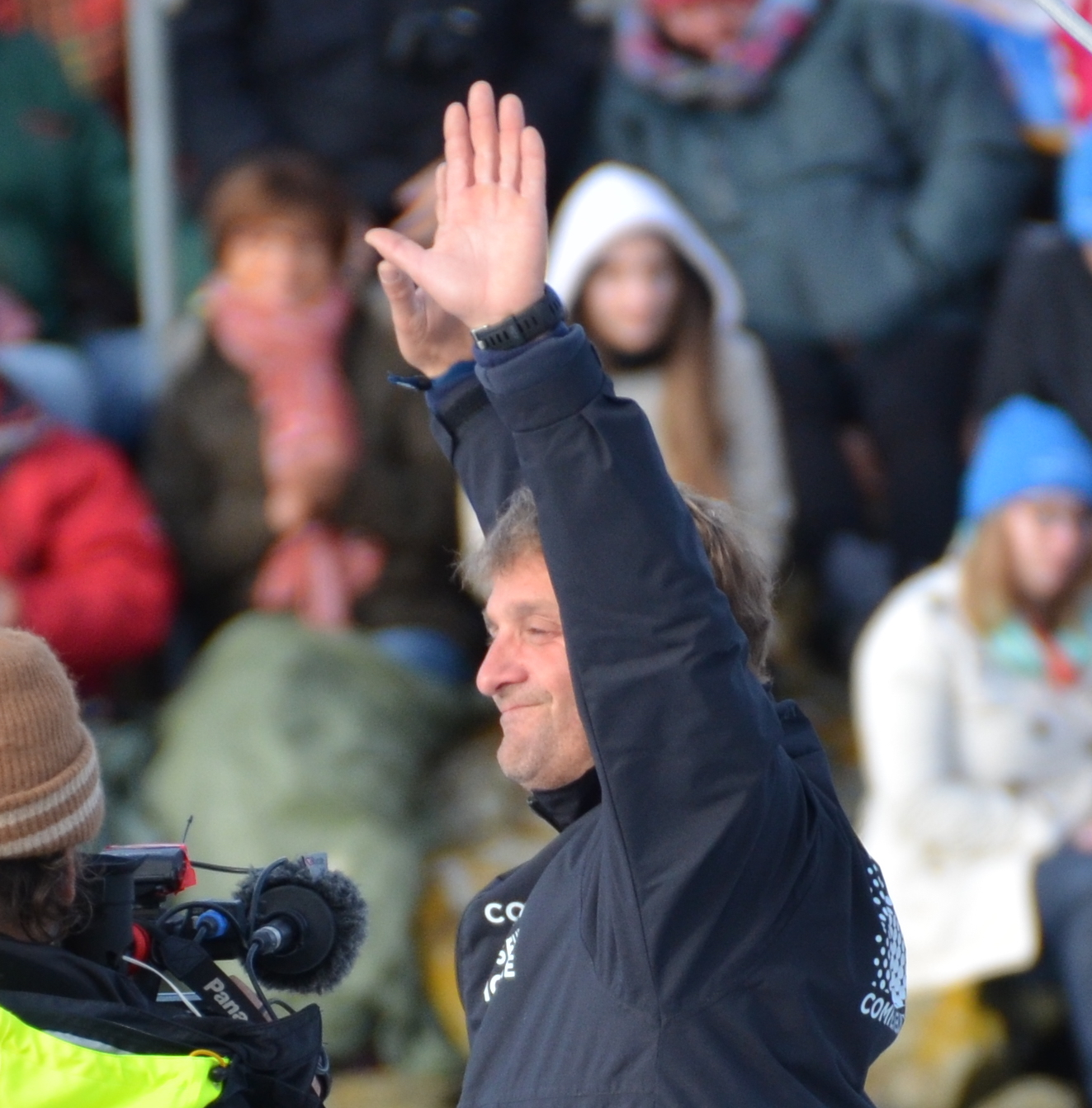

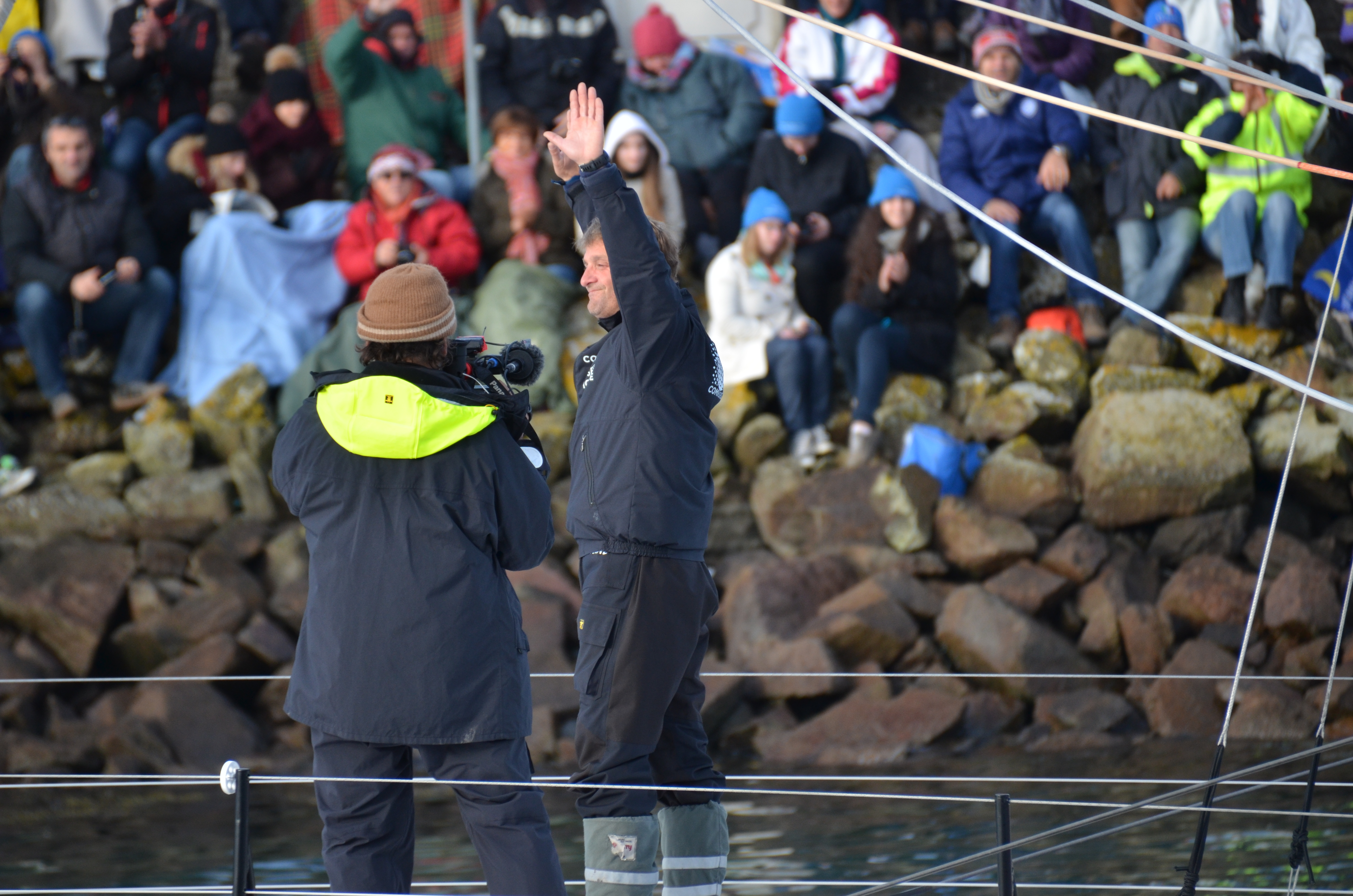

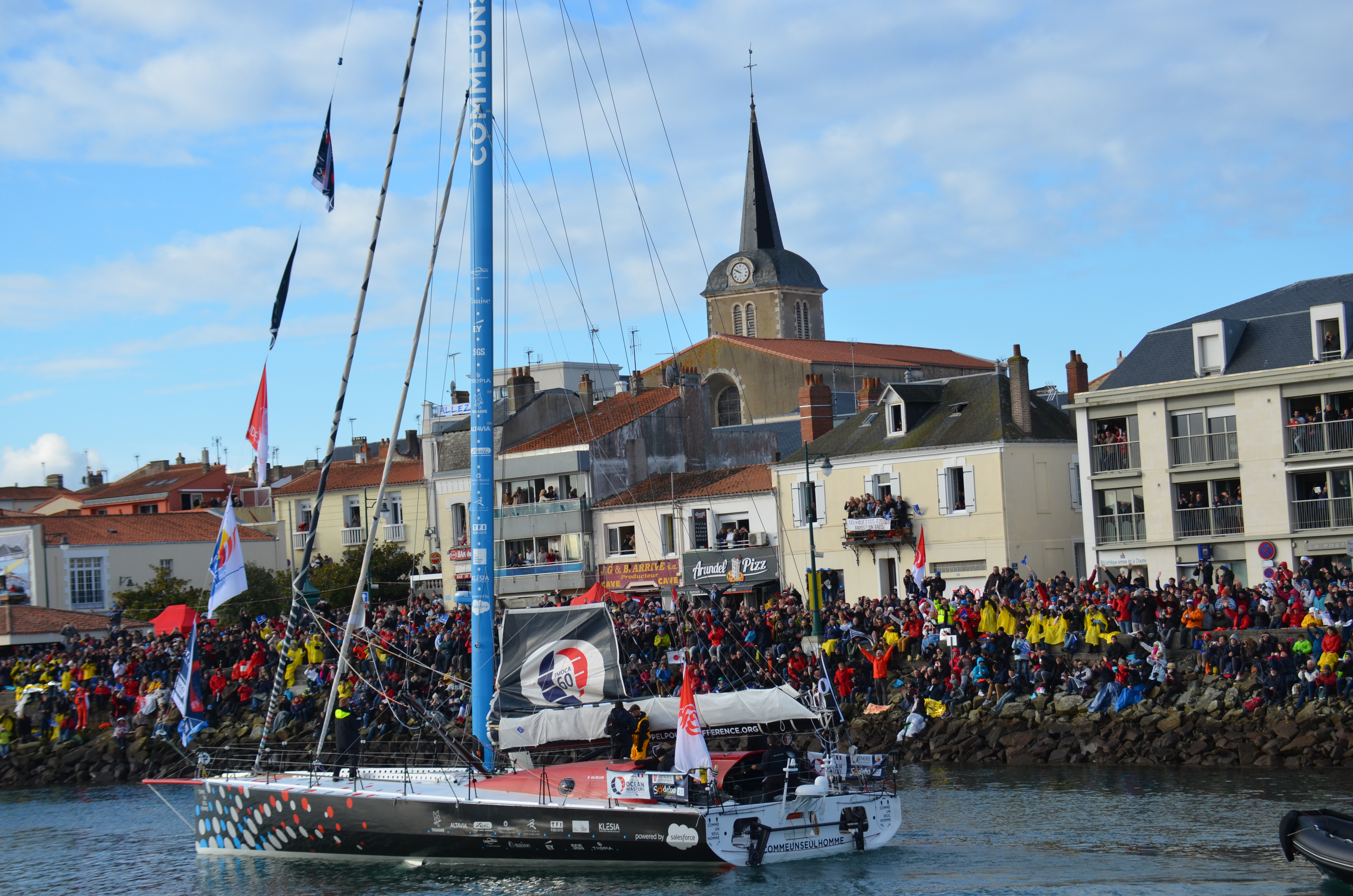

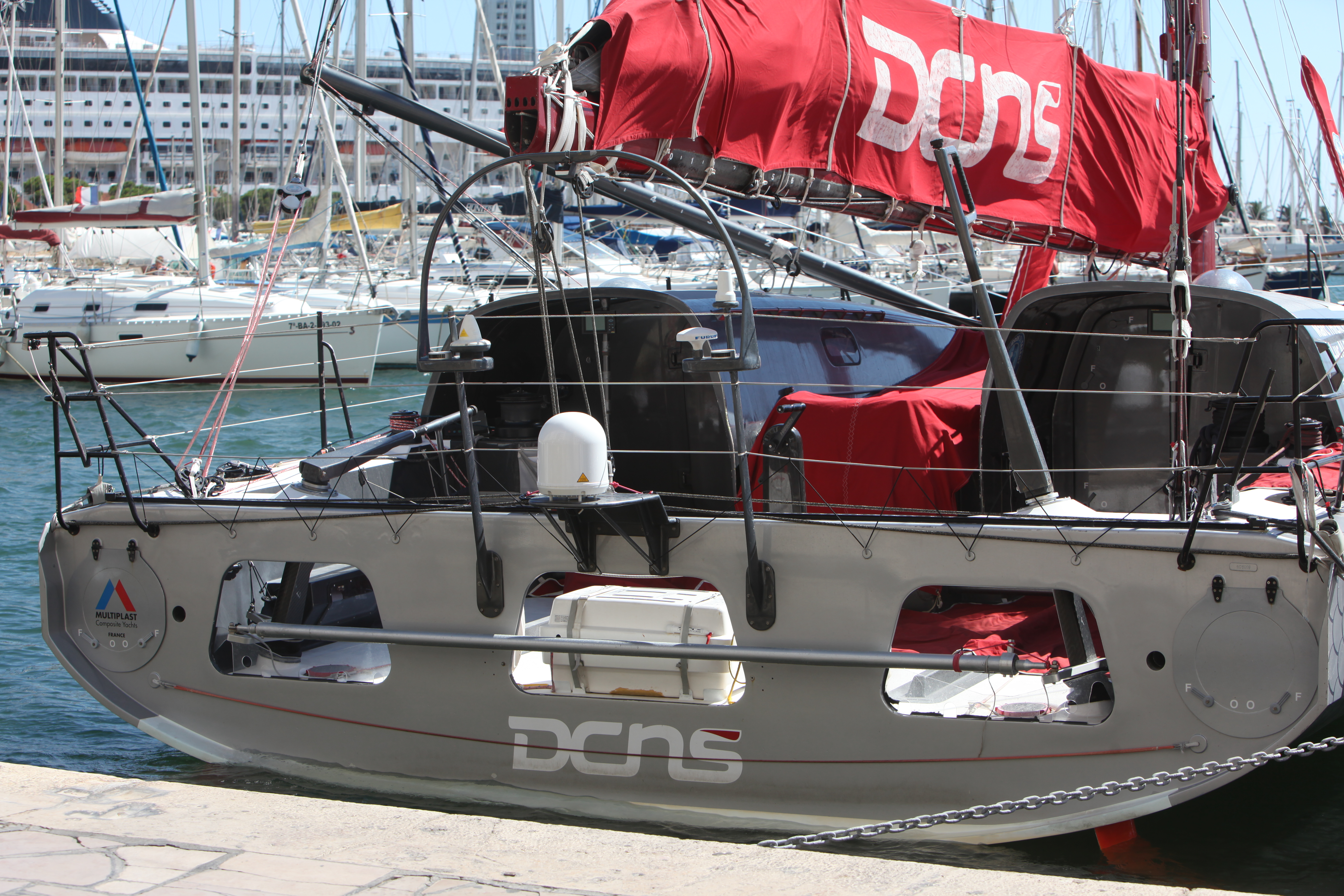

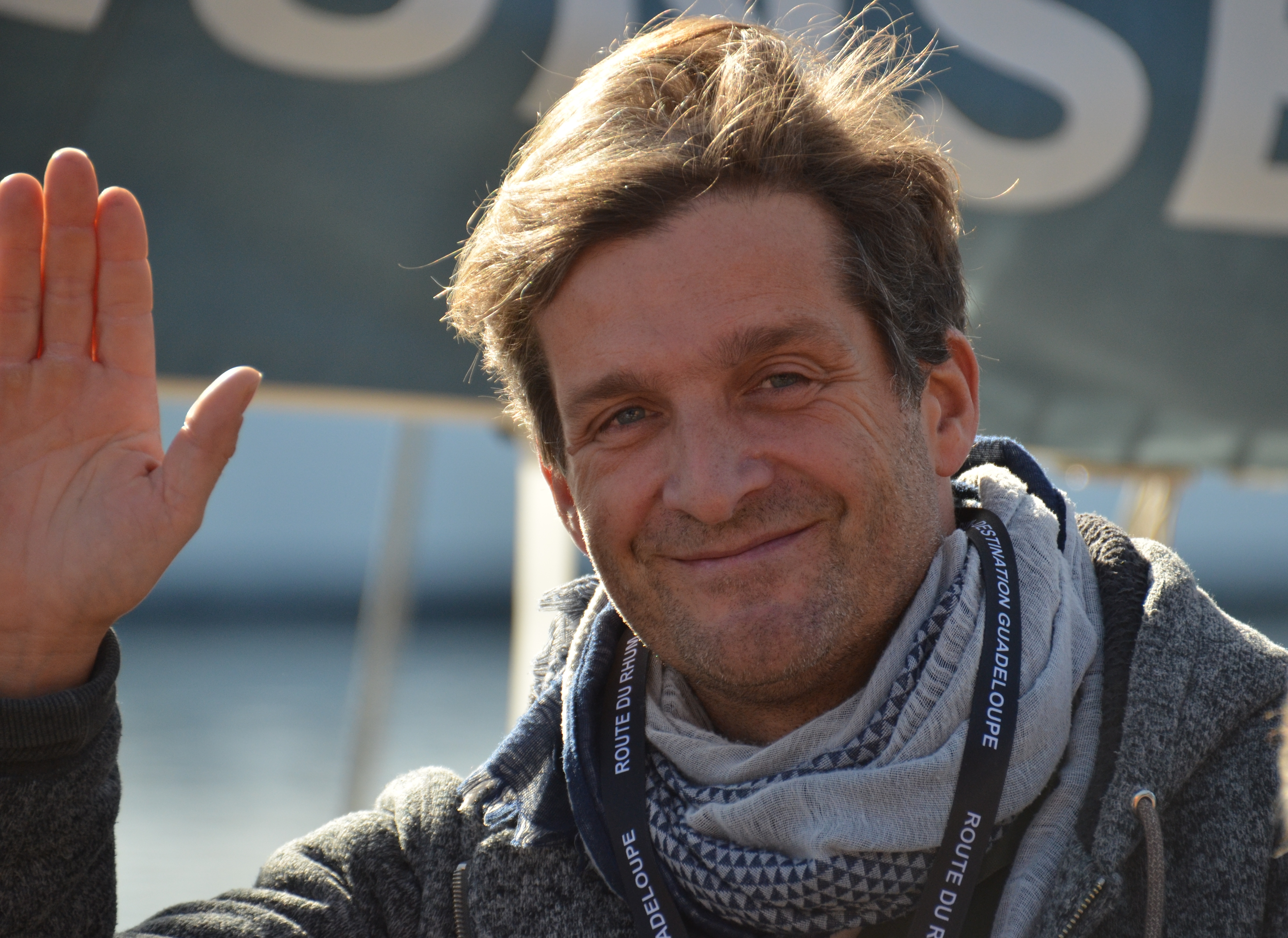
