= Maxime Sorel =

French offshore sailor

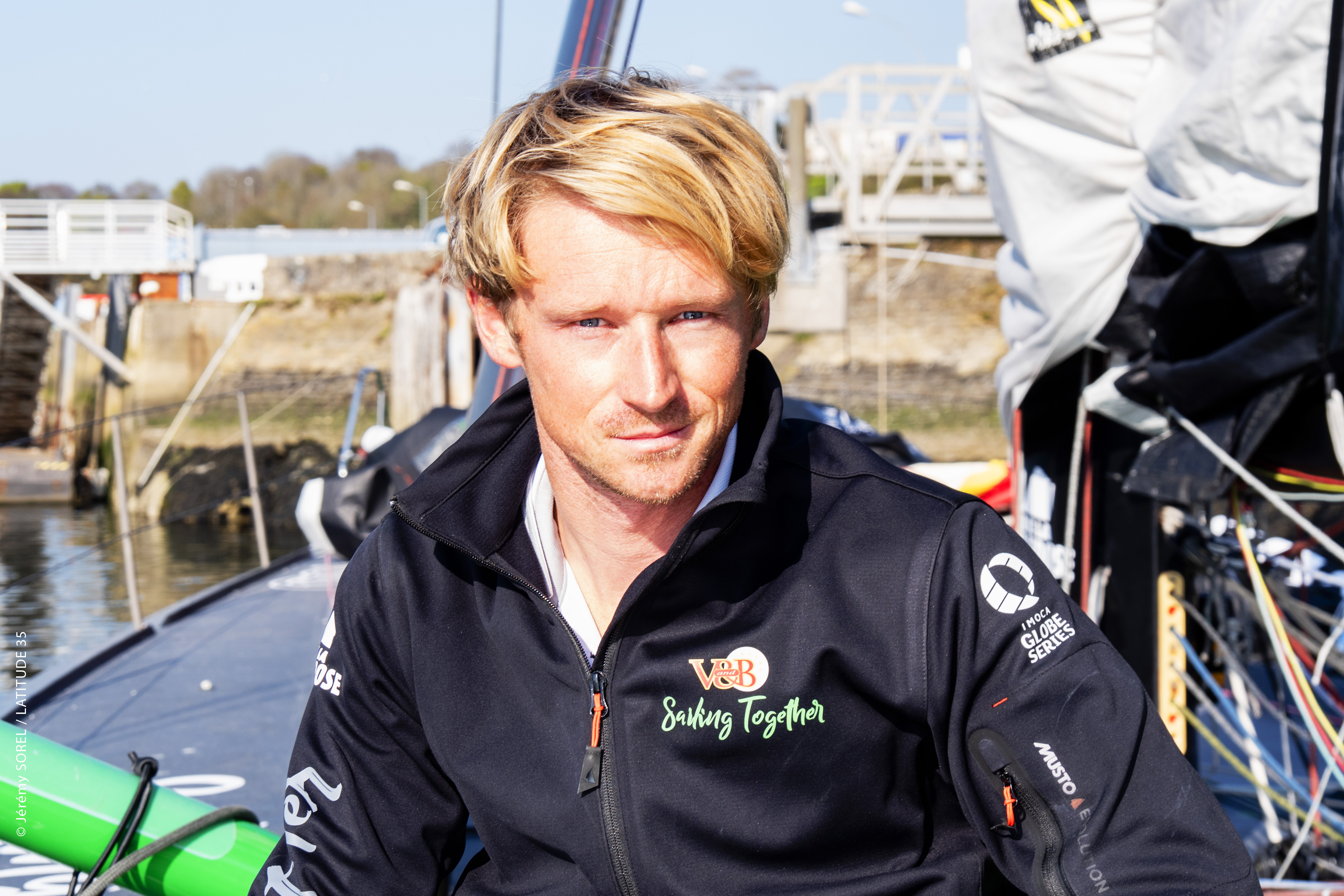

Personal information
- Nationality: French
- Born: 11 August 1986 (age 39) Saint-Malo

Sailing career
- Sport: Sailing
- Class: IMOCA 60

Maxime Sorel is a French professional offshore sailor born on 11 August 1986 in Saint-Malo and now residing in Concarneau, France. He finished 10th in the 2020–2021 Vendée Globe, a solo, non-stop round-the-world yacht race for IMOCA 60 class yachts.

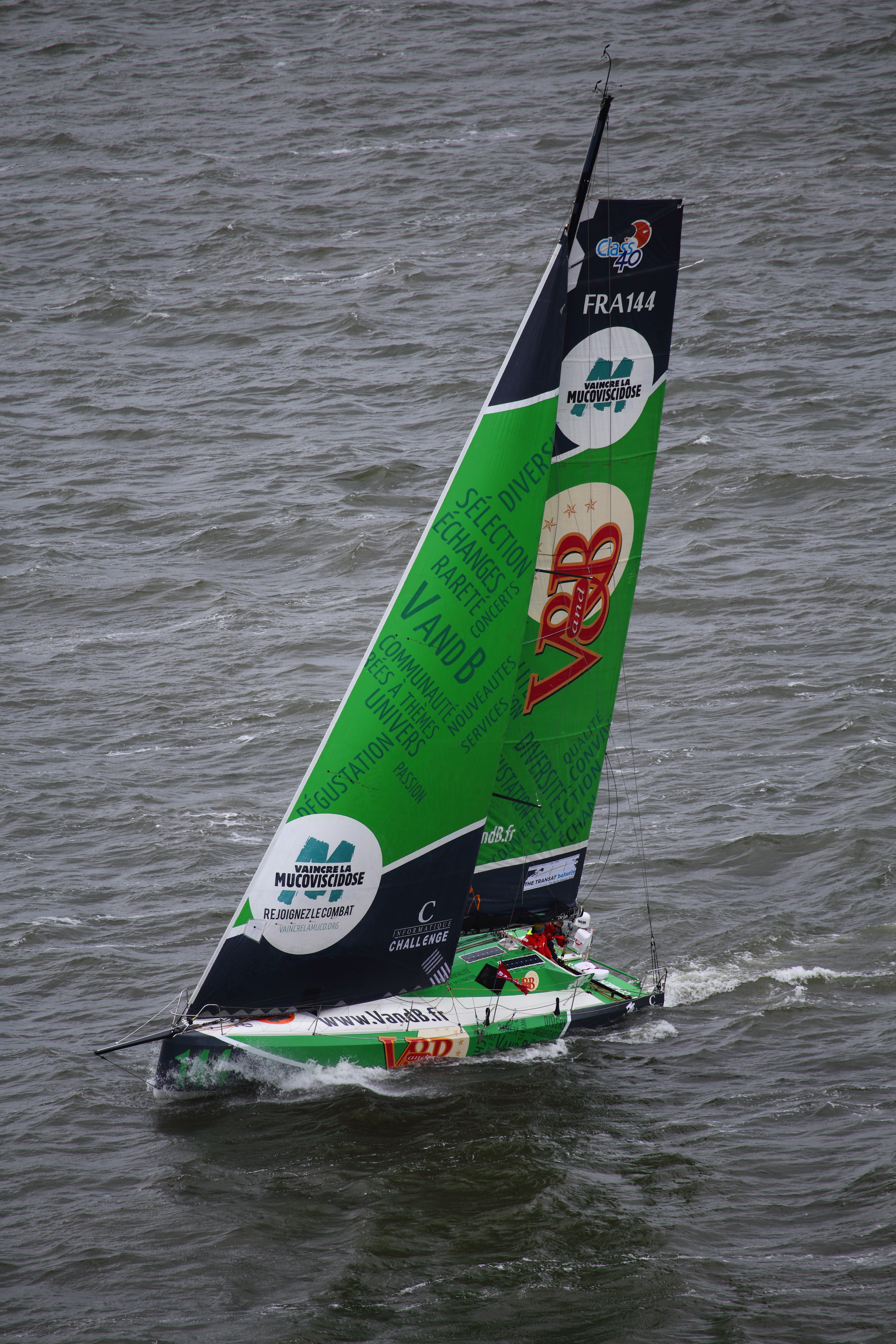
V&B Class 40

== Results Highlights ==
General Reference

Year	Pos.	Race	Class	Boat name	Notes	Ref.
2021	10	2020-2021 Vendée Globe	IMOCA 60	V and B - Mayenne	82d 14h 30m 15s	
2020	11	Vendée-Arctique-Les sables d'olonnes	IMOCA 60	V and B - Mayenne		
2020	11	Défi Azimut	IMOCA 60	V and B - Mayenne		
2019	16	Transat Jacques-Vabre Normandie le Havre	IMOCA 60	V and B - Mayenne		
2019	4	Grand Prix Guyader	IMOCA 60	V and B - Mayenne		
2019	5	Bermudes 1000 Race	IMOCA 60	V and B - Mayenne		
2018	4	Normandy Channel Race	Class40	V and B - Mayenne		
2017	1	Transat Jacques Vabre	Class40	V and B - Mayenne		
2017	1	Rolex Fastnet Race	Class40	V and B - Mayenne		
2017	3	Grand Prix Guyader	Class40	V and B - Mayenne		
2017	3	Normandy Channel Race	Class40	V and B - Mayenne		
