= Sébastien Simon =

French offshore sailor

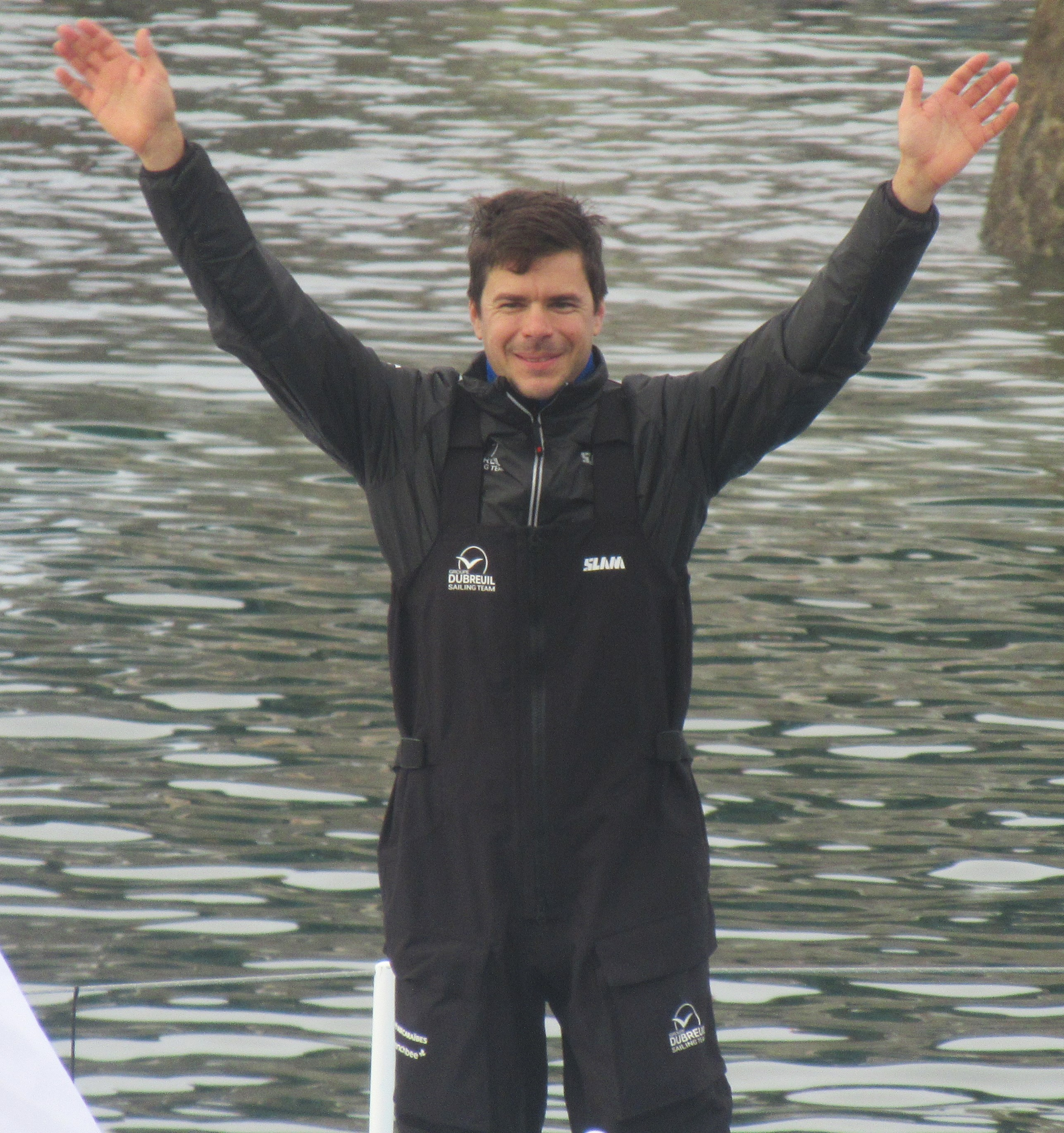

Personal information
- Nationality: French
- Born: 6 May 1990 (age 36) La Roche-sur-Yon

Sailing career
- Sport: Sailing
- Class: IMOCA 60

Sébastien Simon (born 6 May 1990) is a French professional offshore sailor.

== Background ==
He sailed throughout his youth, finishing 3rd in the 2013 420 Class World Championship. He then moved onto the French Offshore scene, winning the Solitaire du Figaro in 2018, and participated in the Vendée Globe in 2020 on the Imoca 60 Arkea-Paprec where it retired due to foil damage.

== Career highlights ==
Year	Pos	Class	Event	Location	Notes	Ref
2024	3 / 40	IMOCA 60	2024–2025 Vendée Globe			
2020	DNF	IMOCA 60	2020–2021 Vendée Globe	Solo Round the World	onboard Arkea-Paprec	
2020	6th	IMOCA 60	Défi Azimut			
2020	RET	IMOCA 60	Vendée-Arctique-Les Sables d'Olonne			
2019	8th	IMOCA 60	Transat Jacques Vabre			
2019	11th	IMOCA 60	Défi Azimut			
2019	RET	IMOCA 60	Rolex Fastnet Race		onboard Arkea-Paprec	
2019	1st	IMOCA 60	Bermudes 1000 Race			
2018	1st		Solitaire Urgo Figaro			
2018	2nd		Transat AG2R-La Mondiale			
2017	4th		Solitaire Urgo Le Figaro			
2016	4th		Transat AG2R-La Mondiale			
2016	11th		Solitaire Bompart Le Figaro			
2013	3rd	420	420 World Championships	Valencia, ESP	with Pierre Rhimbault	
2013	16	J/80	J/80 World Championship	Marseille, FRA		
2009	69	420	420 World Championships	Lake Garda, ITA	with Aymeric Paruit	
