= IMOCA 60 Gitana 80 =

Sailboat

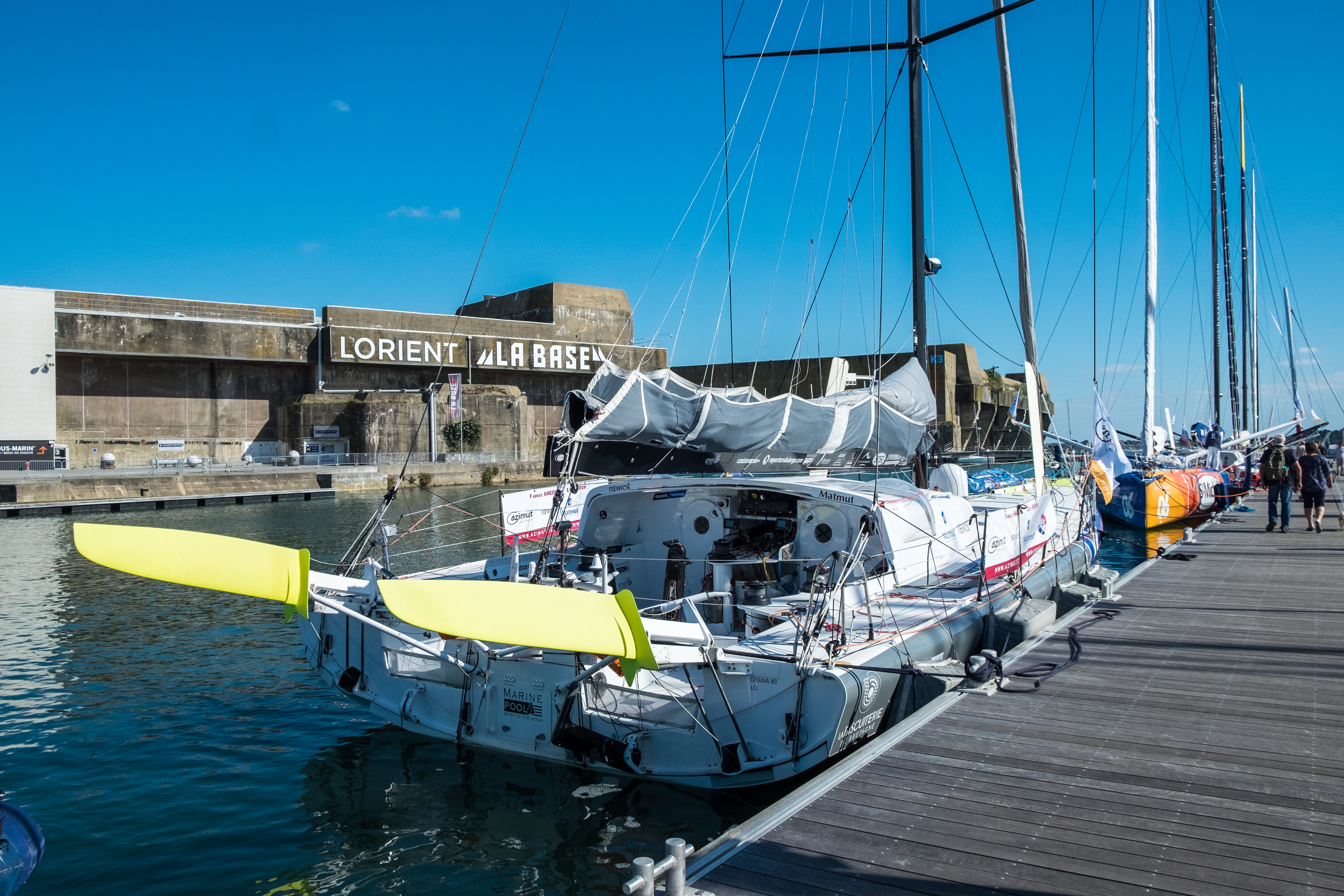

Development
- Designer: Farr Yacht Design
- Year: 19 August 2008
- Builder: Southern Ocean Marine (NZL)

Hull appendages
- Keel: Canting Keel
- Rudder: Twin Rudders

Racing
- Class association: IMOCA 60

The IMOCA 60 class yacht Gitana 80 was designed by Farr Yacht Design, assembled by Southern Ocean Marine based in New Zealand and was then shipped to France where it was launched in 2007. The boat is a sister ship to Paprec Virbac 2, also built by the same builder from the same moulds.

== Names and ownership ==
Caroline (baptismal name)

Gitana Eighty (2008)

- Skipper: Loick Peyron

1876 (2009)

- Skipper: Pachi Rivero

W Hotels

- Skipper: Pachi Rivero

Renault Z.E. (2010)

- Skipper: Pachi Rivero

Synerciel (2012)

- Skipper: Jean Le Cam

GAES Centros Auditivos (2014-2015)

- Skipper: Anna Corbella and Gérard Marin

Newrest-Matmut (2015-2017)

- Skipper: Fabrice Amedeo

Newrest-Brioches Pasquier (2017)

- Skipper: Fabrice Amedeo

Family Mary-Etamine du Lys

- Skipper: Romain Attanasio

Pure-Family Mary (2018)

- Skipper: Romain Attanasio

Pure - Best Western (2018-2021)

- Skipper: Romain Attanasio

Tut gut. Sailing (since 2022)

- Skipper: Oliver Heer
- Sail no.: SUI 49

== Racing results ==
Pos	Year	Race	Class	Boat name	Skipper	Notes	Ref
Round the world races
14 / 33	2021	2020–2021 Vendée Globe	IMOCA 60	Pure - Best Western FRA 49	Romain Attanasio (FRA)	90d 02h 46m	
11 / 29	2016	2016–2017 Vendée Globe	IMOCA 60	Newrest - Matmut, FRA 56	Fabrice Amedeo (FRA)	103d 21h 01m	
3 / 8	2014	Barcelona World Race	IMOCA 60	GAES Centros Auditivos	Anna Corbella and Gérard Marin	91d 5h	
5 / 20	2012	2012–2013 Vendée Globe	IMOCA 60	Synerciel, FRA 59	Jean Le Cam (FRA)	88d 00h 12m	
4 / 14	2010	Barcelona World Race	IMOCA 60	Renault Z.E., ESP 49	Antonio Piris; Pachi Rivero	97d 18h 47m	
DNF / 30	2009	2008–2009 Vendée Globe	IMOCA 60	GITANA EIGHTY, FRA 80	Loick Peyron (FRA)		
Transatlantic Races
Other Races
