= IMOCA 60 Brit Air 2 =

Sailboat

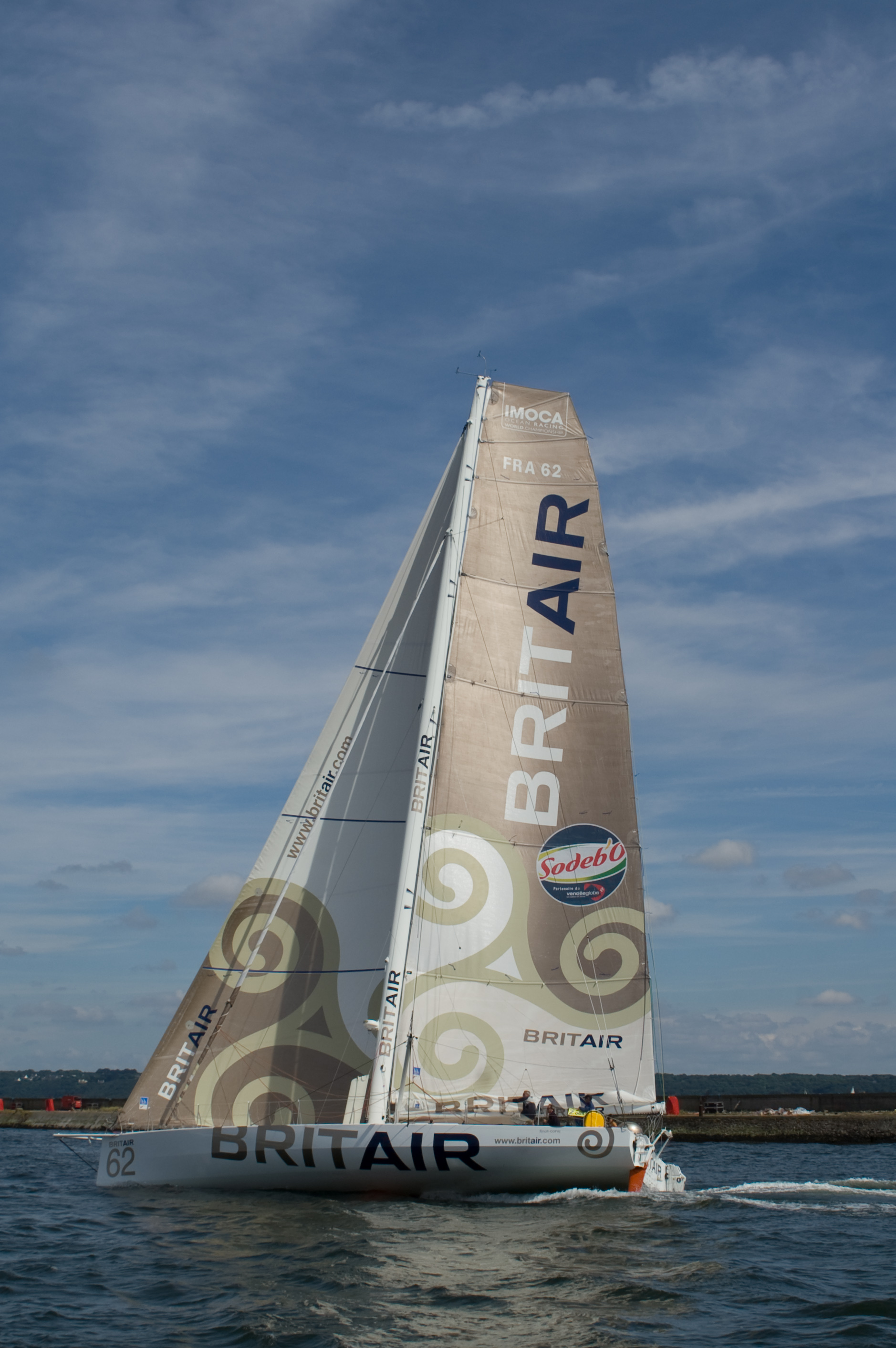

Development
- Designer: Finot-Conq
- Year: 17 July 2007
- Builder: Multiplast

Hull
- Hull weight: Carbon Sandwich

Hull appendages
- Keel: Canting Keel
- Ballast: Water Ballast
- Rudder: Twin Rudders

Rig
- Rig type: Sloop

Racing
- Class association: IMOCA 60

The IMOCA 60 class yacht Brit Air (2), sail number FRA 62, was designed by Finot-Conq and launched in July 2007 after being built by Multiplast in France. Not to be confused with the IMOCA 60 Sodebo was rebranded for the 2006 season and competed as Brit Air while this boat was inbuild.

== Names and ownership ==
Brit Air (2007-2010)

- Skipper: Armel Le Cleach

Votre Nom autour du Monde (2013-2014)

- Skipper: Bertrand De Broc

Renault Captur (2014-2015)

- Skipper: Sébastien Audigane and Jörg Riechers

MACSF (2015-2017)

- Skipper: Bertrand De Broc

La Fabrique (2017-2021)

- Skipper: Alan Roura

China Dream-HAIKOU (2022-2023)

- Skipper: Jingkun Xu

Singchain Team Haikou (since 2023)

- Skipper: Jingkun Xu
- Sail No.: CHN 5

== Racing results ==
Pos	Year	Race	Class	Boat name	Skipper	Notes	Ref
Round the world races
17 / 33	2021	2020–2021 Vendée Globe	IMOCA 60	La Fabrique (2), SUI 21	Alan Roura (SUI)	95d 06h 09m	
DNF / 29	2017	2016–2017 Vendée Globe	IMOCA 60	MACSF	Bertrand De Broc (FRA)	Day 14: Damaged keel - South Atlantic	
6 / 8	2014	Barcelona World Race	IMOCA 60	Renault Captur, GER 62	Sébastien Audigane (FRA); Jörg Riechers (GER)	105d 23h 35m	
9 / 20	2013	2012–2013 Vendée Globe	IMOCA 60	VOTRE NOM AUTOUR DU MONDE - EDM Projects	Bertrand De Broc (FRA)	92d 05h 10m	
2 / 30	2009	2008–2009 Vendée Globe	IMOCA 60	Brit Air	Armel Le Cleach (FRA)	89d 09h 40m	
Transatlantic Races
Other Races
