= IMOCA 60 Linkedout =

IMOCA 60 Racing Yacht

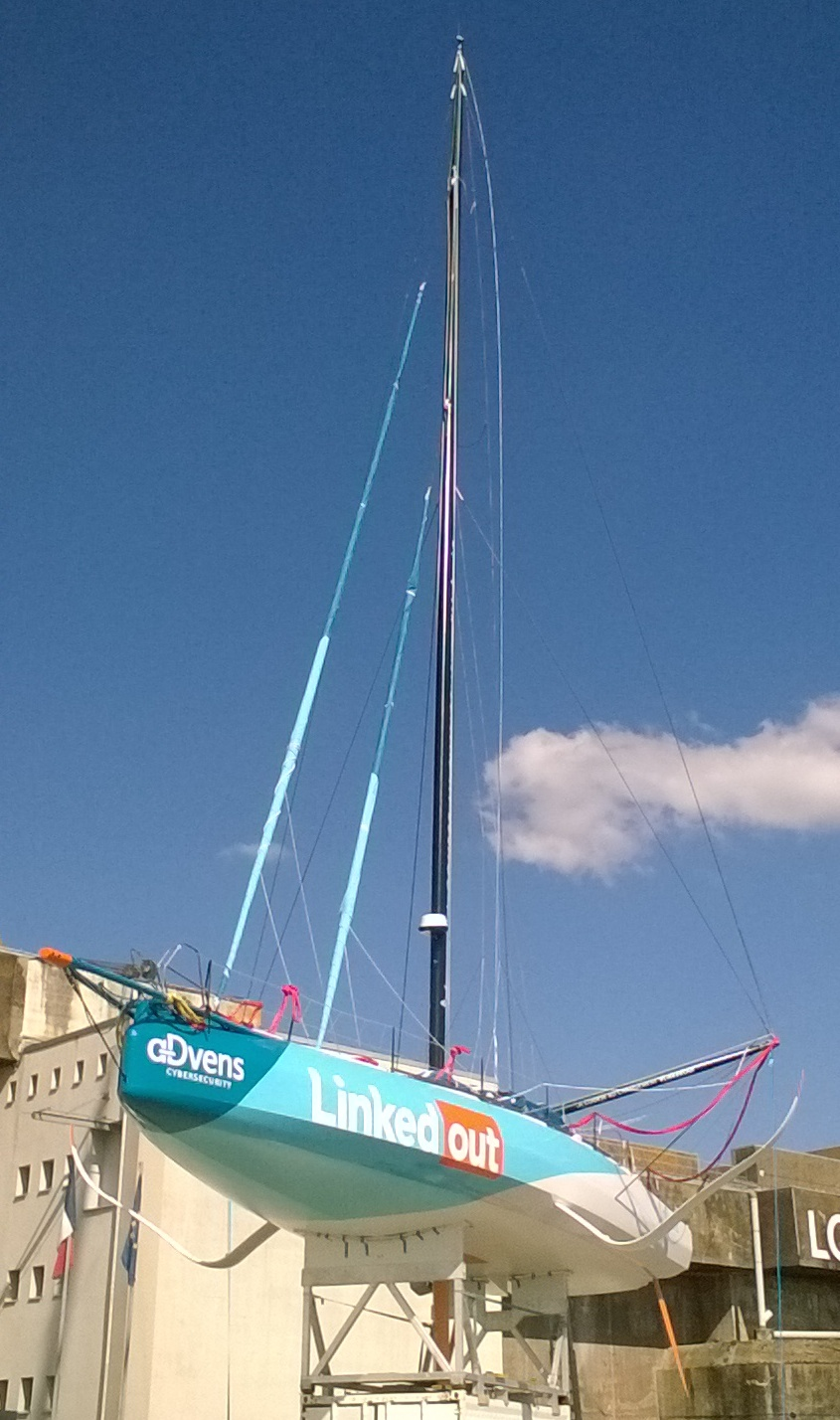

Development
- Designer: Guillaume Verdier Design Office, Guillaume Verdier
- Builder: Persico Marine

Racing
- Class association: IMOCA 60

The IMOCA 60 class yacht LinkedOut, FRA 79 was designed by Guillaume Verdier, built by the Italy-based Persico Marine and launched on 9 July 2019.

== Names and ownership ==
aDvens For Cybersecurity (2019)

- Skipper: Thomas Ruyant
- Sail No.: FRA 59

LinkedOut (2020-2023)

- Skipper: Thomas Ruyant
- Sail No.: FRA 59

For the Planet (since 2023)

- Skipper: Sam Goodchild
- Sail No.: FRA 100

== Racing results ==
Pos	Year	Race	Class	Boat name	Skipper	Notes	Ref
Round the world races
6 / 33	2020	2020–2021 Vendée Globe	IMOCA 60	LinkedOut	Thomas Ruyant (FRA)	80d 15h 22m 01s	
Transatlantic Races
1 / 29	2021	Transat Jacques Vabre	IMOCA 60	LinkedOut	Thomas Ruyant (FRA); Morgan Lagraviere (FRA)	18d 01h 21m	
5 / 29	2019	Transat Jacques Vabre	IMOCA 60	aDvens For Cybersecurity	Thomas Ruyant (FRA); Antoine Koch (FRA)		
Other Races
3 / 5	2021	The Ocean Race Europe	IMOCA 60	LinkedOut	Thomas Ruyant (FRA) + Crew		
