= Charlie Enright =

American sailor

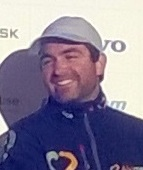

Personal information
- Born: 10 September 1984 (age 41) Rhode Island, United States

Sailing career
- Sport: Sailing
- College team: Brown University

Charlie Enright (born 10 September 1984) is an American sailor who has competed in the Volvo Ocean Race.

Born in Rhode Island, Enright attended Brown University. He sailed in the 2011 and 2019 Fastnet Race, winning the latter, and worked for North Sails.

Enright and Mark Towill co-founded Team Alvimedica which sailed in the 2014–15 Volvo Ocean Race. Originally intended to be an all-American team, the team was American/Turkish flagged after sponsorship from Alvimedica. They were the youngest team in the fleet. Enright skippered the team and, after leading the fleet around Cape Horn and winning the final leg, they finished fifth overall.

Enright sailed in the 2017–18 Volvo Ocean Race, skippering Vestas 11th Hour Racing and finished fifth overall.

He also competed in the 2019 addition of the Transat Jacques Vabre, partnering with French skipper Pascal Bidégorry. They also competed in the Azimut Challenge (Le Défi Azimut) that year.

In his third consecutive challenge for Ocean Race, Charlie Enright skippered 11th Hour Racing team again and won the series. He finished second on Leg 1 (Alicante-Cabo Verde) and third on Leg 2 (Cabo Verde-Cape Town) and Leg 3 (CapeTown-Itajai). He won Leg 4 (Itajai-Newport), Leg 5 (Newport-Aarhus) and Leg 6 (Aarhus-Hague). He was the favorite to win the 7th and last leg of the race. (Hague-Genoa) The team was leading the overall race with just one leg to go, when, on June 25, 2023 in The Hague, just 27 minutes after the start, the team was forced to retire from the final leg, following a no-fault collision with a competing team. The team put in a request for redress to the World Sailing International Jury and, following the hearing this morning, Thursday, June 29, the Jury has awarded 11th Hour Racing Team 4 points of redress, which gives them 37 points and a first place on the overall race leaderboard.
