= Benjamin Dutreux =

French sailor

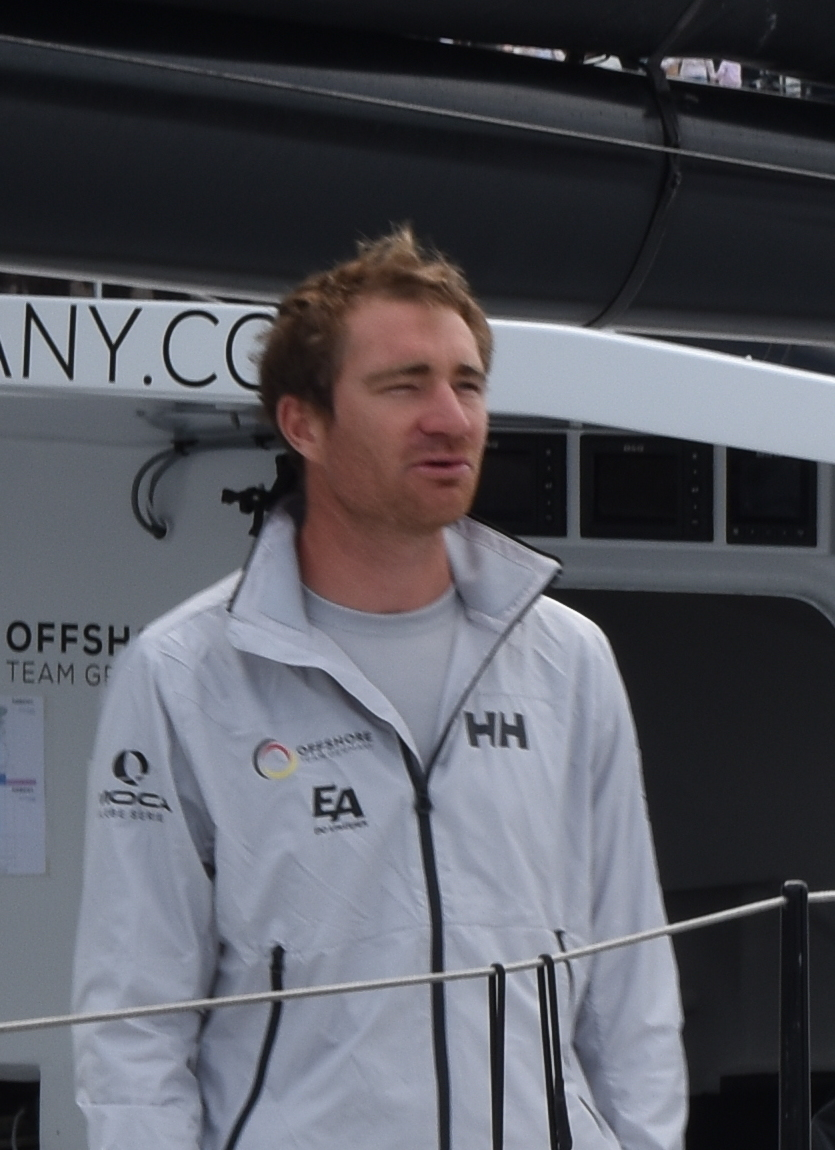

Benjamin Dutreux is a French sailor born on 5 April 1990 in Villeneuve-d'Ascq. He competed in the 2020–2021 Vendée Globe, finishing 9th in a time of 81d, 19h, 45m and 20s.
