= Guillaume Verdier =

French naval architect

Guillaume Verdier is a French naval architect noted for his designs of high performance sailboats. He studied at Southampton Solent University and the University of Southampton before working for Finot-Conq, where he contributed to the design of several 60-foot sailboats.

== Life ==
Verdier was born 28 September 1970. From 1990 to 1993 he studied at MSc in Yacht and Powercraft Design at what is now Southampton Solent University before moving to do a post graduate master at the University of Southampton in Naval Architecture from 1994 to 1995. On completing his degree and then became a member f Naval Architecture Research Department of the University of Copenhagen developing design tools.

== Awards ==
In 2016, the Solent University, his alma mater, awarded him with an honorary doctorate of engineering degree.

== Career ==
Verdier was recruited in 1997 by the company Finot-Conq, Which is known for its designs of 60-foot sailboats. He worked notably on the development of Christophe Auguin's Geodis, Yves Parlier's Aquitaine Innovations and on the conception of Sodebo, Somewhere and on PRB 3 as well, the winner of the Vendée Globe in 2000–2001 with Michel Desjoyeaux.

In 2001, he founded his own company, whose first design was the Yves Parlier's Hydraplaneur.

In 2004, he was part of the design team for the Areva Challenge, which participated in 2007 America's Cup.

From 2006, he began working with naval architects Marc Van Peteghem and Vincent Lauriot-Prévost of VPLP design. Together, they created numerous 60-foot boats:

- Safran
- Groupe Bel for the Vendée Globe 2006–2007,
- PRB 5,
- Virbac Paprec 3,
- Banque populaire and
- Macif

In 2010, he joined the Emirates Team New Zealand to design the AC72 with the team of Grant Dalton for the America's Cup in 2013. He contributed to the development of foils that permitted the sailboat to leave the surface of the water and to attain speeds in excess of 40 knots.

In 2014, he designed the monohull Comanche with the intention of creating the fastest monohull in the world.

Following his experience with ETNZ, Verdier worked on Banque populaire VIII of Armel Le Cléac'h, a 60-foot monohull launched in 2015.

In 2017 the trimaran Maxi, named for the Edmond de Rothschild Group, was launched.
