= The Transat =

Transatlantic yacht race

- Formerly: Single-Handed Trans-Atlantic Race
- First held: 1960 / 2004
- Type: Single-handed sailing Yacht racing
- Classes: Ultim, IMOCA, Multi 50, Class40
- Start: Lorient, France (in 2024)
- Finish: New York City, United States (in 2024)
- Length: 3 500 nautical miles
- Website: www.thetransat.com

The Transat (also known as The Transat CIC or The English Transat) is a transatlantic yacht race first held in 2004 as a spin-off for professional sailors from the Single-Handed Trans-Atlantic Race which is limited to amateurs since.

== History ==
After the 2000 event, The Royal Western Yacht Club, organizer of the Single-Handed Trans-Atlantic Race, decided to split the race into two separate events. As a result, in 2004 professional edition of the race featured a new title The Transat.

The professional event has been run as The Transat from 2004, while the race smaller boats is run as the OSTAR. Throughout its history, however, the essentials of the race have remained the same. It has also become known as a testbed for new innovations in yacht racing; many new ideas started out in "the STAR".

== Yacht classes ==
| Class | 2004 | 2008 | 2016 | 2024 |
|---|---|---|---|---|
| Multihull – Ultim 32/23 | | | • | |
| Multihull – ORMA 60 | • | | | |
| Multihull – Multi 50 / Open Fifty | • | | • | |
| Monohull – IMOCA 60 | • | • | • | • |
| Monohull – Class 40 | | • | | • |
| Monohull – Open 50 | • | | | |
| Vintage | | | | • |

== The Transat, 2004 ==
The 2004 professional edition of the race featured a new title — The Transat — and a new finish, at Boston, Massachusetts. 37 boats entered, in four classes: ORMA 50 and 60-foot (18 m) multihulls; and IMOCA 50 and 60-foot (18 m) monohulls. Despite stormy conditions, all four classes of boats broke records; seven of the Open 60 monohulls broke the previous monohull record. Of the first four IMOCA Open 60's, Ecover, Pindar AlphaGraphics and Skandia (ex Kingfisher) were all designed by the British designers, Owen Clarke Design. This office also designed the first IMOCA 50, Artforms, which broke the 'Class 2' record. Several boats suffered damage, however.

| Pos. | Skipper | Boat | Time |
ORMA 60 Multihulls
| 1 | Michel Desjoyeaux (FRA) | Geant | 8 days 08 hours 29 m |
| 2 | Thomas Coville (FRA) | Sodebo | 8 days 10 hours 38 m |
| 3 | Franck Cammas (FRA) | Groupama | 8 days 14 hours 16 m |
| 4 | Alain Gautier (FRA) | Foncia | 9 days 07 hours 05 m |
| 5 | Karine Fauconnier (FRA) | Sergio Tacchini | 9 days 12 hours 36 m |
| 6 | Lalou Roucayrol (FRA) | Banque Populaire | 9 days 14 hours 05 m |
| 7 | Giovanni Soldini (ITA) | TIM Progetto Italia | 10 days 06 hours 26 m |
| 8 | Philippe Monnet (FRA) | Sopra | 10 days 09 hours 28 m |
| 9 | Fred Le Peutrec (FRA) | Gitana XI | 11 days 09 hours 20 m |
| 10 | Steve Ravussin (SUI) | Banque Covefi | 12 days 04 hours 27 m |
| 11 | Yves Parlier (FRA) | Mediatis Region Aquitaine | 13 days 07 hours 11 m |
| RET | Marc Guillemot (FRA) | Gitana X | retired – broken centerboard |
IMOCA 60 Monohulls
| 1 | Mike Golding (GBR) | Ecover 2 | 12 days 15 hours 18 m |
| 2 | Dominique Wavre (SUI) | Temenos (1) | 12 days 18 hours 22 m |
| 3 | Mike Sanderson (NZL) | Pindar Alphagraphics | 12 days 20 hours 54 m |
| 4 | Nick Moloney (AUS) | Skandia | 13 days 09 hours 13 m |
| 5 | Conrad Humphreys (GBR) | Hellomoto | 13 days 20 hours 24 m |
| 6 | Marc Thiercelin (FRA) | Pro-Form | 14 days 01 hours 41 m |
| 7 | Hervé Laurent (FRA) | UUDS | 14 days 03 hours 58 m |
| 8 | Sebastien Josse (FRA) | VMI | 14 days 10 hours 02 m (corrected) |
| 9 | Karen Leibovici (FRA) | Atlantica-Charente Maritime | 17 days 17 hours 12 m |
| 10 | Norbert Sedlacek (AUT) | Austria One | 17 days 18 hours 35 m |
| 11 | Charles Hedrich (FRA) | Obdectif 3 | 18 days 04 hours 12 m |
| 12 | Anne Liardet (FRA) | Quicksilver | 19 days 14 hours 27 m |
| RET | Jean-Pierre Dick (FRA) | Virbac-Paprec (1) | retired – dismasted |
| RET | Vincent Riou (FRA) | PRB 2 | dismasted |
| RET | Bernard Stamm (SUI) | Chemees Poudoulat Armour Lux | capsized |
ORMA 50 Multihulls
| 1 | Éric Bruneel (FRA) | Trilogic | 14 days 01 hours 23 m |
| 2 | Rich Wilson (USA) | Great American II | 15 days 00 hours 19 m |
| 3 | Dominique Demachy (FRA) | Gify | 15 days 13 hours 13 m |
| 4 | Etienne Hochede (FRA) | PiR2 | 19 days 13 hours 45 m |
| RET | Franck-Yves Escoffier (FRA) | Crepes Whaou! | retired – broke daggerboard |
| RET | Mike Birch (CAN) | Nootka | retired – broken autopilot |
IMOCA 50 Monohulls
| 1 | Kip Stone (USA) | Artforms | 15 days 05 hours 20 m |
| 2 | Joe Harris (USA) | Wells Fargo | 16 days 14 hours 21 m |
| 3 | Jacques Bouchacourt (FRA) | Okami | 17 days 23 hours 17 m |
| DNF | Roger Langevin (FRA) | Branec III | over time limit |

== The Artemis Transat, 2008 ==
The 2008 Transat race was named after its sponsor, Artemis. On Thursday 15 May, Frenchman Michel Desjoyeaux (Foncia) had to retire from the race after a collision with a whale. Sebastien Josse (BT), who was leading, had to retire owing to damage to the mainsail carriage on Saturday 17 May, leaving Vincent Riou (PRB) take the lead on the Sunday morning. Loïck Peyron, on Gitana Eighty, caught up with Vincent Riou, who had to abandon the race due to serious keel damage after a collision with a basking shark on the night of Monday 12 / Tuesday 13 May. The race dury decided to grant two and a half hours of bonus time to Loïck Peyron after he rescued Vincent Riou. Starting on 11 May from Plymouth, Peyron spent 12 days, 11 hours, 15 mutes and 35 seconds (not including the time bonus) to cover the 2,992 miles of the race (averaging 8.7 knots), thus improving previous record of 12 days, 15 hours, 18 mutes and 8 seconds, which was held by Mike Golding (Ecover).

| Position | Skipper | Boat | Time |
IMOCA 60 Monohulls
| 1 | Loïck Peyron (FRA) | Gitana Eighty | 12 days 08 hours 45 m |
| 2 | Armel Le Cléac'h (FRA) | Brit Air | 12 days 12 hours 28 m 40 s |
| 3 | Yann Eliès (FRA) | Generali | 13 days 14 hours 30 m 22 s |
| 4 | Marc Guillemot (FRA) | Safran (2) | 14 days 21 hours 18 m 47 s |
| 5 | Samantha Davies (GBR) | Roxy (2) | 15 days 10 hours 00 m 51 s |
| 6 | Yannick Bestaven (FRA) | Cervin EnR | 15 days 14 hours 31 m 17 s |
| 7 | Arnaud Boissières (FRA) | Akena Vérandas (2) | 15 days 16 hours 00 m 03 s |
| 8 | Dee Caffari (GBR) | Aviva | 16 days 02 hours 05 m 34 s |
| 9 | Steve White (GBR) | Spirit Of Weymouth | 16 days 15 hours 04 m 54 s |
| DNF | Michel Desjoyeaux (FRA) | Foncia | retired – broken skeg |
| DNF | Sébastien Josse (FRA) | BT | retired – sail damage |
| DNF | Vincent Riou (FRA) | PRB 3 | retired – broken keel |
| DNF | Unai Basurko (ESP) | Pakea Bizkaia | |
Class40 Monohulls
| 1 | Giovanni Soldini (ITA) | Telecom Italia | 16 days 22 hours 11 m 27 s |
| 2 | Boris Herrmann (GER) | Beluga Racer | 17 days 12 hours 09 m 47 s |
| 3 | Thierry Bouchard (FRA) | Mistral Loisirs – Pole Santé ELIOR | 17 days 21 hours 42 m 57 s |
| 4 | Louis Duc (FRA) | Groupe Royer | 18 days 02 hours 51 m 15 s |
| 5 | Halvard Mabire (FRA) | Custo Pol | 18 days 03 hours 05 m 7 s |
| 6 | Alex Bennett (GBR) | Fudifilm | 18 days 05 hours 53 m 2 s |
| 7 | Miranda Merron (GBR) | 40 Degrees | 18 days 19 hours 19 m 34 s |
| 8 | Benoît Parnaudeau (FRA) | Prévoir Vie | 18 days 21 hours 21 m 02 s |
| 9 | Christophe Coatnoan (FRA) | Groupe Partouche | 19 days 00 hours 28 m 20 s |
| 10 | Simon Clarkes (GBR) | Clarke Offshore Racing | 19 days 06 hours 15 m 36 s |
| RET | Yvon Noblet (FRA) | Appart City | |

== The Transat Bakerly 2016 ==
| Pos. | Skipper | Boat | Time | Ref. |
IMOCA 60 Monohulls
| 1 | Armel Le Cléac'h (FRA) | Banque Populaire VIII | 12d 02h 28m 39s | |
| 2 | Vincent Riou (FRA) | PRB (4) | | |
| 3 | Jean-Pierre Dick (FRA) | St.Michel-Virbac | | |
| 4 | Paul Meilhat (FRA) | SMA | | |
| DNF | Sebastien Josse (FRA) | Edmond De Rothschild | | |
| DNF | Richard Tolkien (FRA) | 88 | Abandoned boat | |
Class40 Monohulls
| 1 | Thibaut Vauchel-Camus (FRA) | No.137 – Solidaires en peloton ARSEP | 17 days 12 hrs 42 ms 56 secs | |
| 2 | Louis Duc (FRA) | No.65 – CARAC | | |
| 3 | Phil Sharp (GBR) | No.130 – IMERYS | | |
| 4 | Edouard Golbery (FRA) | No.135 – NORMANDIE | | |
| 5 | Robin Marais (FRA) | No. 81 – ESPRIT SCOUT | | |
| 6 | Anna-Maria Renken (GER) | No.138 NIVEA | | |
| 7 | Hiroshi Kitada (FRA) | No. 146 KIHO | | |
| DNF | Maxime Sorel (FRA) | No.144 – VANDB | | |
| DNF | Isabelle Joschke (FRA) | No. 131 – GENERALI-HORIZON MIXITE | | |
| DNF | Armel Tripon (FRA) | No. 134 – BLACKPEPPER | | |
Ultim Multihull
| 1 | François Gabart (FRA) | MACIF | 8-day 8 hours 54 m 39 secs | |
| 2 | Thomas Coville (FRA) | SODEBO | | |
| 3 | Yves Le Blevec (FRA) | Actual | | |
Multi 50
| 1 | Gilles Lamiré (FRA) | La French Tech Rennes Saint-Malo | 12 days 7 hrs 51 m 17 secs | |
| 2 | Lalou Roucayrol (FRA) | | | |
| 3 | Pierre Antoine (FRA) | | | |
| 4 | Erik Nigon (FRA) | | | |
| DNF | Erwan Le Roux (FRA) | | | |

== The Transat CIC 2020 ==
The 2020 races were canceled due to the COVID-19 pandemic.

== The Transat CIC 2024 ==
The start of the 15th edition of the race is announced for the 28th of April 2024.

IMOCA 60, Class40 as well as a vintage sailboat category was announced to participate.

Indicated competitors
| Pos. | Skipper | Boat | Year | Time | Ref. |
IMOCA 60 Monohulls
| 1 | Yoann Richomme (FRA) | Paprec Arkéa | 2023 | 8d 6h 53m 32s | |
| 2 | Boris Herrmann (GER) | Malizia - Seaexplorer | 2022 | 8d 9h 12m 31s | |
| 3 | Sam Davies (GBR) | Initiative Coeur 4 | 2022 | 8d 12h 41m 37s | |
| 4 | Charlie Dalin (FRA) | MACIF Santé Prévoyance | 2023 | 8d 14h 44m 28s | |
| 5 | Maxime Sorel (FRA) | V and B - Monbana - Mayenne | 2022 | 8d 15h 34m 03s | |
| 6 | Yannick Bestaven (FRA) | Maitre Coq V | 2022 | 8d 18h 38m 16s | |
| 7 | Justine Mettraux (SUI) | Teamwork.net | 2018 | 8d 19h 41m 20s | |
| 8 | Damien Seguin (FRA) | Group Apecil 2 | 2015 | 9d 03h 29m 32s | |
| 9 | Louis Burton (FRA) | Bureau Vallée (2) | 2020 | 9d 04h 37m 38s | |
| 10 | Sébastien Simon (FRA) | Groupe Dubreuil | 2021 | 9d 20h 02m 35s | |
| 11 | Tanguy Le Turquais (FRA) | Lazare | 2008 | 9d 22h 35m 34s | |
| 12 | Isabelle Joschke (GER) (FRA) | MACSF | 2007 | 9d 23h 19m 49s | |
| 13 | Alan Roura (SUI) | Hublot | 2019 | 9d 23h 34m 36s | |
| 14 | Nicolas Lunven (FRA) | Holcim - PRB | 2022 | 10d 08h 55m 57s | |
| 15 | Paul Meilhat (FRA) | Biotherm | 2022 | 10h 15h 02m 19s | |
| 16 | Kojiro Shiraishi (JPN) | DMG Mori Global One | 2019 | 10d 16h 53m 22s | |
| 17 | Guirec Soudée (FRA) | Freelance.com | 2007 | 10d 19h 08m 02s | |
| 18 | Violette Dorange (FRA) | Devenir | 2007 | 10d 19h 20m 23s | |
| 19 | James Harayda (GBR) | Gentoo Sailing Team | 2007 | 11d 07h 38m 26s | |
| 20 | Eric Bellion (FRA) | Stand As One | 2023 | 11d 09h 01m 07s | |
| 21 | Giancarlo Pedote (ITA) | Prysmian Group | 2015 | 11d 10h 37m 57s | |
| 22 | François Guiffant (FRA) | Partage | 2004 | 11d 14h 30m 54s | |
| 23 | Fabrice Amedeo (FRA) | Nexans - Wewise | 2007 | 12d 02h 08m 52s | |
| 24 | Denis Van Weynbergh (BEL) | D'Ieteren Group | 2014 | 12d 03h 02m 26s | |
| 25 | Oliver Heer (SUI) | Oliver Heer Ocean Racing | 2007 | 18d 10h 49m 32s | |
| 26 | Clarisse Cremer (FRA) | L’Occitane en Provence (2) | 2019 | 20d 12h 38m 43s | |
| DNF | Benjamin Ferré (FRA) | Monnoyeur Duo For A dob | 2011 | | |
| DNF | Jérémie Beyou (FRA) | Charal (2) | 2022 | | |
| DNF | Louis Duc (FRA) | Fives Group - Lantana Environment | 2006 | | |
| DNF | Antoine Cornic (FRA) | Human Immobilier | 2005 | | |
| DNF | Arnaud Boissières (FRA) | La Mie Câline | 2010 | | |
| DNF | Sébastien Marsset (FRA) | Foussier - Mon courtier énergie | 2006 | | |
| DNF | Jean Le Cam (FRA) | Tout commence en Finistère - Armor-lux | 2023 | | |
Class40 Monohulls
| 1 | Ambrogio Beccaria (ITA) | Alla Grande - Pirelli | | 11d 16h 17m 55 | |
| 2 | Ian Lipinski (FRA) | Crédit Mutuel | | 11d 18h 38m 06 | |
| 3 | Fabien Delahaye (FRA) | Legallais | | 11d 21h 28m 56 | |
| 4 | Nicolas D'Estais (FRA) | Café doyeux | | 11d 23h 56m 55 | |
| 5 | Alberto Bona (FRA) | IBSA Group | | 12d 04h 35m 37 | |
| 6 | Vincent Riou (FRA) | Pierreval | | 12d 22h 31m 35 | |
| 7 | Amelie Grassi (FRA) | La Boulangère Bio | | 13d 12h 30m 27 | |
| TBC | Anatole Facon (FRA) | Good Morning Pouce | | | |
| DNF | Thimote Polet (FRA) | ZEISS - WeeeCycling | | | |
| DNF | Axel Trehin (FRA) | Prodect Rescue Ocean | | | |
| DNF | Goulven Marie (FRA) | Qwanza | | | |
| DNF | Quentin le Nabour (FRA) | Bleu Blanc Planète Location | | | |
| DNF | Aurelien Ducroz (FRA) | Crosscall | | | |
Vintage
| | Patrick Isoard (FRA) | Uship pour Enfants du Mekong | | | |
| | Rémy Gerin (FRA) | Faiaoahe | | | |

== See also ==
- Single-Handed Trans-Atlantic Race
- IMOCA 60
