= Le Défi Azimut =

Annual yacht race from Lorient, France

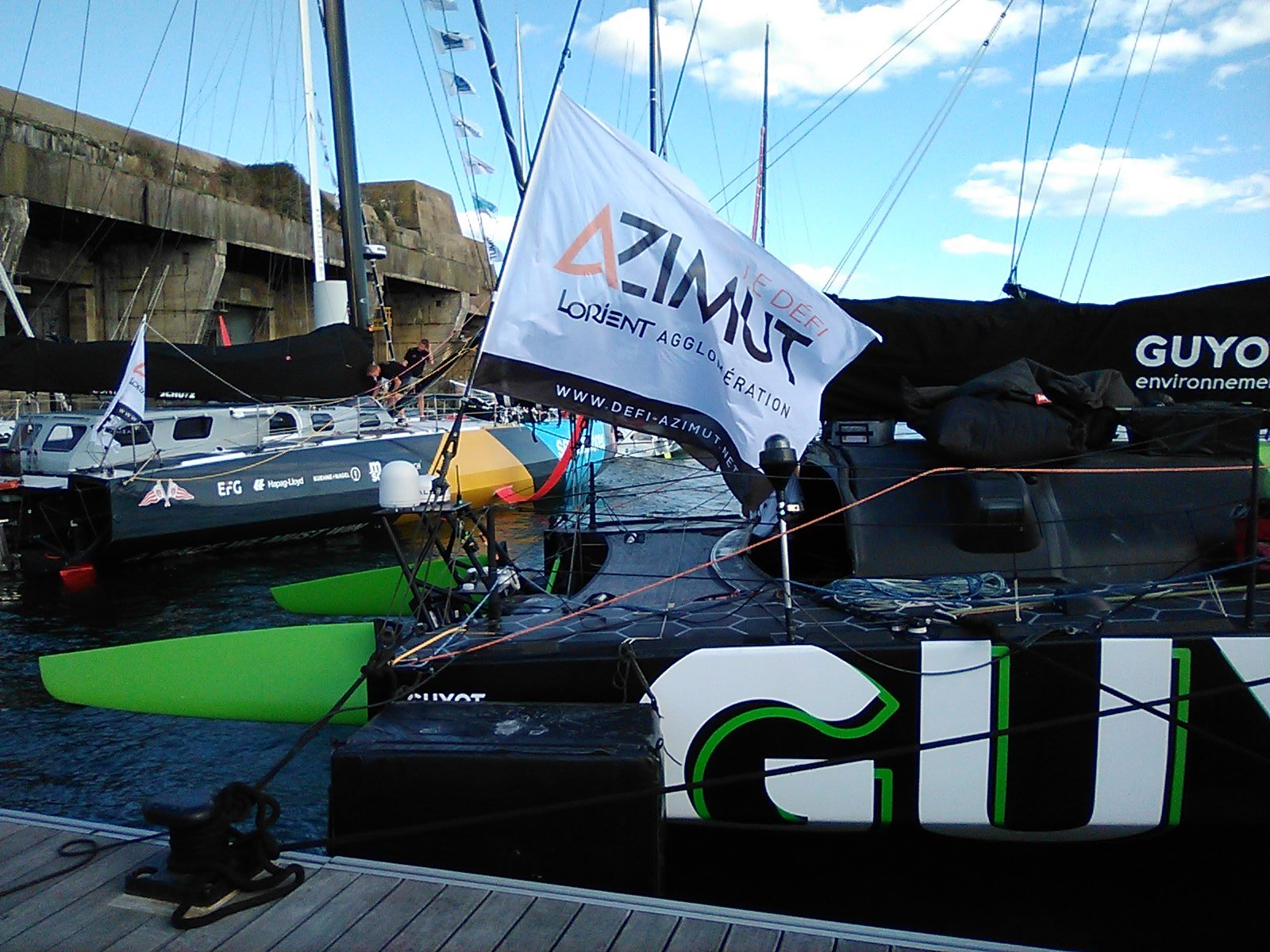
- Sponsor: Azimut
- First held: 2011
- Type: off-shore race
- Classes: IMOCA 60, Ultim
- Start: Lorient
- Finish: Lorient
- Venue: Bay of Biscay
- Website: defi-azimut.net

Le Défi Azimut (French for "The Azimut challenge") is a yacht race open only to the IMOCA 60 class. The yearly race, first held in 2011, contains typically three different competitions starting in Lorient, France. The main event, a 48-hour offshore race in the Bay of Biscay is accompanied by the short Tour de Groix and a competition of speed runs over one nautical mile.

== Races ==
The competitions are held in solo or double-handed configurations alternating between the modes even and uneven years. In 2022 the competitions were also open for a crewed version, in preparation for the 2023 The Ocean Race. The Runs competition is always raced in a crewed configuration.

Race directors is Hubert Lemonnier. In 2023 onboard reporters were required in the races.

=== Azimut race ===
Until 2018, the main event was a 24h race over approximately 200 to 250 nautical miles in length. Since 2019, the 48 hour race (approximately 500 to 550 nautical miles), takes the competitors onto the Bay of Biscay.

=== Tour de Groix ===
The Tour de Groix is a small race rounding the island Groix a few kilometres off the coast of Lorient. Depending on weather conditions the race takes about two hours for the usually fully crewed boats.

=== Runs competition ===
In the Runs competition the fully crewed boats compete in several rounds against each other on a one nautical mile long course.

== Winners ==
=== Azimut race ===
Year	First	Second	Third	Winning time	Winning yacht	Ref.
2011	Vincent Riou (FRA) Hugues Destremau (FRA)	François Gabard (FRA) Sébastien Col (FRA)	Jean-Pierre Dick (FRA) Jérémy Beyou (FRA)	21h 33m	PRB 4	
2012	Jean-Pierre Dick (FRA)	Armel Le Cléac’h (FRA)	Vincent Riou (FRA)		Virbac-Paprec 3	
2013	François Gabart (FRA) Michel Desjoyeaux (FRA)	Vincent Riou (FRA) Jean Le Cam (FRA)	Bernard Stamm (SUI) Philippe Legros (FRA)	20h 36m	Macif	
2014	Jérémie Beyou (FRA)	Marc Guillemot (FRA)	Vincent Riou (FRA)		Maître CoQ	
2015	Vincent Riou (FRA) Sébastien Col (FRA)	Jérémie Beyou (FRA) Philippe Legros (FRA)	Paul Meilhat (FRA) Michel Desjoyeaux (FRA)		PRB 4	
2016	Armel Le Cléac’h (FRA)	Morgan Lagravière (FRA)	Jérémie Beyou (FRA)		Banque Populaire	
2017	Paul Meilhat (FRA) Gwénolé Gahinet (FRA)	Lagravière (FRA) Loïck Peron (FRA)	Isabelle Joschke (FRA) Pierre Brasseur (FRA)		SMA	
2018	Vincent Riou (FRA)	Sam Davies (GBR)	Yann Eliès (FRA)	18h 39m 25s	PRB 4	
2019	Jérémie Beyou (FRA) Christopher Pratt (FRA)	Kevin Escoffier (FRA) Nicolas Lunven (FRA)	Charlie Enright (USA) Pascal Bidégorry (FRA)	1d 18h 43m 46s	Charal	
2020	Jérémie Beyou (FRA)	Sam Davies (GBR)	Isabelle Joschke (FRA)	1d 20h 56m 59s	Charal	
2021	Charlie Dalin (FRA) Paul Meilhat (FRA)	Justine Mettraux (SUI) Simon Fisher (USA)	Thomas Ruyant (FRA) Morgan Lagraviere (FRA)	1d 15h 48m 02s	Apivia	
2022 crew	Charlie Enright (USA)	Benjamin Dutreux (FRA)	Boris Herrmann (GER)	1d 18h 56m 58s	11th Hour	
2022 solo	Charlie Dalin (FRA)	Thomas Ruyant (FRA)	Jérémie Beyou (FRA)	1d 15h 42m 50s	Apivia	
2023	Jérémie Beyou (FRA) Franck Cammas (FRA)	Charlie Dalin (FRA) Pascal Bidégorry (FRA)	Sam Goodchild (GBR) Thomas Ruyant (FRA)	1d 17h 46 m 43s	Charal 2	

=== Tour de Groix ===
Only skippers, the Tour de Groix is held in a crewed setup.

Year	First	Second	Third	Winning time	Winning yacht	Ref.
2012	François Gabart (FRA)	Vincent Riou (FRA)	Jérémie Beyou (FRA)		Macif	
2013	Marc Guillemot (FRA)	François Gabart (FRA)	Jörg Riechers	2h 38m	Safran	
2014	Marc Guillemot (FRA)	Jérémie Beyou (FRA)	Vincent Riou (FRA)		Safran	
2015	Vincent Riou (FRA)	Jérémie Beyou (FRA)	Paul Meilhat (FRA)	1h 08m 10s	PRB 4	
2016	Paul Meilhat (FRA)	Vincent Riou (FRA)	Morgan Lagraviere (FRA)	1h 32m 41s	SMA	
2017	Paul Meilhat (FRA)	Jean-Pierre Dick (FRA)	Morgan Lagraviere (FRA)	1h 34m	SMA	
2018						
2019	Jérémie Beyou (FRA) Christopher Pratt (FRA)	Jean Le Cam (FRA) Nicolas Troussel (FRA)	Fabrice Amedeo (FRA)	1h 08m 24s	Charal	
2020	Kevin Escoffier (FRA)	Charlie Dalin (FRA)	Maxime Sorel (FRA)	2h 29m 47s	PRB 4	
2021	Thomas Ruyant (FRA) Morgan Lagraviere (FRA)	Charlie Dalin (FRA) Paul Meilhat (FRA)	Sam Davies (GBR) Nicolas Lunven (FRA)	1h 52m 37s	Linked Out	
2022	Benjamin Ferré (FRA)	Eric Bellion (FRA)	Ollie Heer (SUI)	1h 57m 21s	Monnoyeur – Duo for a Job	
2023	no Tour de Groix due to rescheduling of the main event due to a storm					

=== Runs competition ===
Only skippers, the Runs are held in a crewed setup.

Year	First	Second	Third	Winning time	Winning yacht	Ref.
2013	François Gabart (FRA)	Jérémie Beyou (FRA)	Jörg Riechers (GER)	4m 40s	Macif	
2014	Jérémie Beyou (FRA)	Marc Guillemot (FRA)	François Gabart (FRA)	6m 56s	Maître CoQ	
2015	Paul Meilhat (FRA)	Jean-Pierre Dick (FRA)	Vincent Riou (FRA)	4m 59s	SMA	
2016	Morgan Lagraviere (FRA)				Safran	
2017						
2018	Jérémie Beyou (FRA)	Sam Davies (GBR)	Paul Meilhat (FRA)	4m 52s	Charal	
2019	Jérémie Beyou (FRA)				Charal	
2020	Armel Tripon (FRA)			3m 5s	L'Occitane en provence	
2021	Charlie Enright (USA)	Thomas Ruyant (FRA)	Manuel Cousin (FRA)	6m 53s	11th Hour	
2022	Charlie Dalin (FRA)	Jérémie Beyou (FRA)	Charlie Enright (USA)	2m 43s	Apivia	
2023	Yoann Richomme (FRA)	Charlie Dalin (FRA)	Jérémie Beyou (FRA)	2m 40s	Paprec Arkea	

== Ultim spinoff ==
In 2014 the Défi Azimut added a race for Ultim class offshore trimarans. Sébastien Josse won ahead of Sidney Gavignet, Yann Eliès and Loïck Peyron.

The event returned in 2021 with three participants. Armel Le Cléac'h won ahead of Thomas Coville and Yves Le Blevec.

== See also ==
- Vendée Globe
