= Boris Herrmann =

German yachtsman

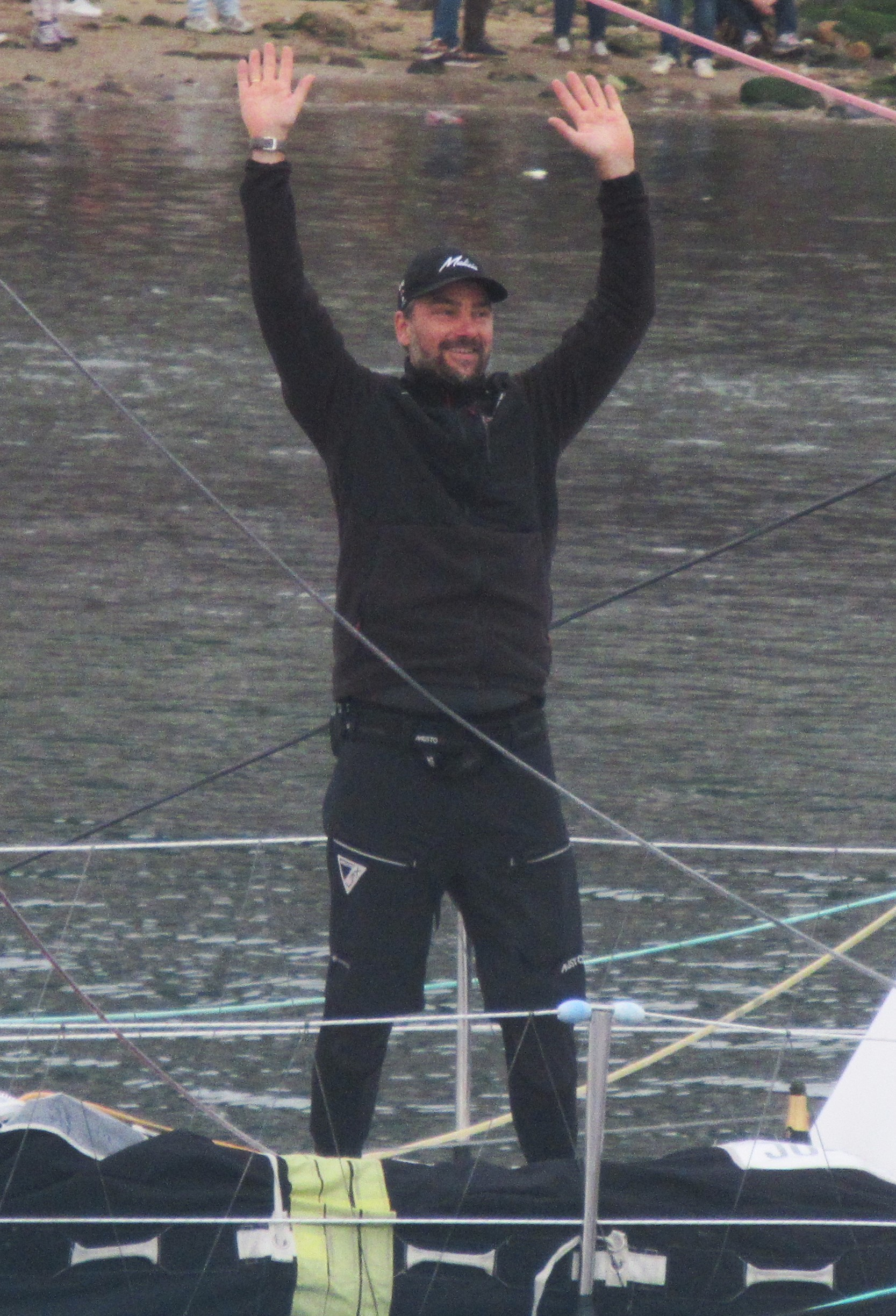
- Herrmann in 2024
- Born: 28 May 1981 (age 45); Oldenburg, Lower Saxony, West Germany
- Occupation: Yachtsman
- Spouse: Birte Lorenzen-Herrmann
- Children: 1
- Website: team-malizia.com

Boris Herrmann (born 28 May 1981) is a German yachtsman and author competing mostly in offshore races in the IMOCA 60 class.

He placed fifth in the 2020/21 Vendée Globe and third in the 2023 The Ocean Race. With the experiences of these races he wrote two books. He is currently preparing his campaign for the 2024/25 Vendée Globe with the Malizia-Seaexplorer, the first boat developed under his own management.

Together with Pierre Casiraghi he founded the sailing team Team Malizia to support his IMOCA 60 campaign. The team belongs to the most professional and financially more competitive teams in the IMOCA 60 class.

== Early life ==
Boris Herrmann was born on 28 May 1981 in Oldenburg, Lower Saxony where he grew up in a household enthusiastic towards sailing.

He finished school at the Neues Gymnasium Oldenburg. Next to his activities in sport he studied economics in Bremen with a specialisation in sustainable management.

== Sailing career ==
=== Start in Mini and 505 dinghy classes (2001-2007) ===
In 2001 Boris Herrmann was the youngest (and the only German) participant in the Mini Transat race, a single-handed yacht race across the Atlantic. He came to finish eleventh which earned him his first larger appearance in the yachting press.

From 1999 onwards he competed in the 505 dinghy class. In 2006 Herrmann finished second in the European Championship as well as in the German Championship in the 505 class. He also competed in the 505 World Championships finishing 17th in 2005, 7th in 2006 and 9th in 2007 in highly competitive 100+ boat fleets.

=== Class 40 and various offshore sailing projects (2008-2017) ===
In spring 2008 Herrmann sailed his Class 40 yacht “Beluga Racer” to a second in the Artemis Transat, the oldest transatlantic regatta for single-handed yachts.

Boris Herrmann won the Portimão Global Ocean Race in 2008, a five leg regatta around the world for Class 40 boats. He and his co-skipper Felix Oehme (the Beluga Offshore Sailing Team) came to win three of the five legs of the race, and left behind the team Desafio Cabo de Hornos. This makes them the first German professional team on a German yacht to win a leg of an international trans-ocean race and the whole race itself.

With the crew of the Italian skipper Giovanni Soldini he was part in setting a new record on the "Golden Route" from New York to San Francisco in 2014. With a modified Volvo Ocean 70 yacht "Maserati" they finished in 47 days and 42 minutes, about 10 days faster than the previous record.

In 2015 he was part of an international crew skippered by Francis Joyon for an attempt on the Jules Verne Trophy. Though completing the circumnavigation they failed to break the record of Loïck Peyron from 2012 by 2 days. He made a second attempt for the Jules Verne Trophy in 2016 again with Francis Joyon as a skipper and on the trimaran IDEC Sport. They abandoned the race after 6 days due to bad weather making a record highly unlikely.

2016 and 2017 he participated in the GC32 Racing Tour leading the Team Malizia alongside Pierre Casiraghi.

=== IMOCA 60 circuit (since 2017) ===
In 2020/2021 Boris Herrmann was the first German (apart from the Franco-German Isabelle Joschke) to take part in the prestigious 2020 - Vendée Globe, which started on 8 November 2020 in front of Les Sables-d'Olonne in the Vendée department in France. He crossed the finish line in 5th place with an elapsed time of 80d 20h 59m 45s. In total Boris Herrmann achieved 5th place between Jean Le Cam on 4th and Thomas Ruyant on 6th place. Due to a granted time compensation of 6 hours as part of the rescue of Kevin Escoffier in late November 2020, Boris Herrmann came out with a total regatta time of 80d 14h 59m 45s.

On the 19th June 2022 he launched his new boat Malizia-Seaexplorer, with which he participated in the 14th edition of The Ocean Race. The ship is constructed for his participation in the 2024/2025 Vendée Globe.

In 2023 Boris Herrmann competed in the 14th edition of The Ocean Race, sailing around the world in the toughest crewed race in the world over with co-skippers Will Harris, Rosalin Kuiper, Nicolas Lunven and Antoine Auriol. The crew passed Cape Horn in first place in leg 3 of the race. During the first leg he injured his foot which led to him skipping the second leg. Herrmann and his crew reached third place overall and second in the in-port-series.

In the 2024/2025 Vendeé Globe Boris Herrmann scored an overall 12th place with Malizia-Seaexplorer. Having fallen back during the initial days of the race, Herrmann managed to race back into the top 10. After some technical difficulties involving the J2 and a nearby lightning strike, a collision with an unidentified object or animal damaged one of the foils on January 16. This ultimately forced Herrmann to focus on finishing the race in whatever safe fashion still possible.

Malizia-Seaexplorer was sold to 11th hour racing in 2025, for italian-american skipper Francesca Clapcich. Boris Herrmann subsequently announced the construction of a new IMOCA 60.

== Other activities ==
On 29 July 2019, it was announced that Boris Herrmann was to sail climate activist Greta Thunberg from Plymouth to New York City in mid-late August 2019 on his emission-free racing yacht Malizia II. They departed on 14 August 2019 and arrived on 28 August the same year.

== Sailing results ==
Year	Pos	Event	Class	Yacht	Notes	Ref
Round the world races
2024	12	Vendée Globe	IMOCA 60	Malizia-Seaexplorer	solo	
2023	3	The Ocean Race	IMOCA 60	Team Malizia	Crewed Third overall, Second in in-port-series with Will Harris, Rosalin Kuiper, Nicolas Lunven, Yann Eliès, Christopher Pratt, Antoine Auriol	
2020	5	Vendée Globe	IMOCA 60	Seaexplorer - Yacht Club de Monaco	solo	
2015	-	Jules Verne Trophy attempt	Ultim	IDEC Sport	crewed; skipper: Francis Joyon; unsuccessful attempt for fastest circumnavigation	
2010	5	Barcelona World Race	IMOCA 60	Neutrogena	with Ryan Breymaier	
2008	1	Portimão Global Ocean Race	Class40	Beluga Racer	with Felix Oehme	
Transatlantic Races
2024	2	Transat New York Vendée	IMOCA 60	Malizia-Seaexplorer	solo, 10d 20h 52m 32s	
2024	2	The Transat CIC	IMOCA 60	Malizia-Seaexplorer	solo, 8d 9h 12m 31s	
2023	4	Retour à la base	IMOCA 60	Malizia-Seaexplorer	solo; 9d 20h 02m 41s	
2023	7	Transat Jaques Vabre	IMOCA 60	Malizia-Seaexplorer	with Will Harris; 12d 09h 01m 03s	
2022	24	Route du Rhum	IMOCA 60	Malizia-Seaexplorer	solo	
2019	12	Transat Jacques Vabre	IMOCA 60	Malizia II	with Will Harris	
2018	5	Route du Rhum	IMOCA 60	Malizia II	solo	
2017	4	Transat Jacques Vabre	IMOCA 60	Malizia II	with Thomas Ruyant	
2008	2	Artemis Transat	Class40	Beluga Racer	solo	
2008	7	Transat Quebec - Saint Malo	Class40	Beluga Racer	with Meike Schomeker, Matthias Beilken and Michel Kleinjans	
2001	11	Mini Transat	Classe Mini	Global Crossing	solo	
Other Races
2023	7	24h Le Défi Azimut	IMOCA 60	Malizia-Seaexplorer	with Will Harris	
2022	3	24h Le Défi Azimut	IMOCA 60	Malizia-Seaexplorer	Team trials, skipper, crewed	
2020	7	24h Le Défi Azimut	IMOCA 60	Seaexplorer - Yacht Club de Monaco		
2020	7	Vendée-Arctique – Les Sables d’Olonne	IMOCA 60	Seaexplorer - Yacht Club de Monaco	solo	
2019	7	Rolex Fastnet Race	IMOCA 60	Malizia II	with Will Harris	
2018	7	Monaco Globe Series	IMOCA 60	Malizia II	with Pierre Casiraghi	
2017	3	Rolex Fastnet Race	IMOCA 60	Malizia II	with Pierre Casiraghi	
2017	5	GC32 Racing Tour	GC32	Malizia - Yacht Club de Monaco	crewed	
2016	6	GC32 Racing Tour	GC32	Malizia - Yacht Club de Monaco	crewed	
2013	7	CIC Normandy Channel Race	Class40	Red	with Mathias Mueller von Blumencron	
2011	8	CIC Normandy Channel Race	Class40	Red	with Mathias Mueller von Blumencron	
2010	3	Happy Baie! La Trinite sur Mer	Class40	40 Degrees	with Conrad Colman and Jesse Naimark-Rowse	
2009	3	Rolex Fastnet Race	Class40	Beluga Racer	with Didier le Vourch, Yvon Berrehar and Gérald Bibot	
2008	5	Marblehead Halifax	Class40	Beluga Racer	with Brian Hancock, Arno Kronenberg and Jan Sangman	
2008	6	Grand prix petit navire	Class40	Beluga Racer	solo	
2007	9	World Cup	505er		double handed, with Julien Kleiner	
2007	1	German Championships	505er		double handed, with Julien Kleiner	
2006	7	World Cup	505er		double handed, with Julien Kleiner	
2006	2	EuroCup	505er		double handed, with Julien Kleiner	
2005	17	World Cup	505er		double handed, with Julien Kleiner	
2001	11	Mini Fastnet	Classe Mini	Lop Lop	with Matthias Beilken	

== Bibliography ==
- Nonstop: Süchtig nach Segeln / Driven by the Sea, 2021,
- Allein zwischen Himmel und Meer, 2021 together with Andreas Wolfers
- Abenteuer Ocean Race, 2023, together with Andreas Wolfers
- My Ocean Challenge – Kurs auf Klimaschutz, 2023, children's book, together with Birte Lorenzen-Herrmann

== Sources ==
- Article at Seglermagazin.de Artemis Transat 2008: Boris Herrmann sensationell Zweiter 30. Mai 2008
- Article at Manager Magazin "Man liegt immer auf der Lauer" 15. November 2008
- "Deutsche Segler mit historischem Erfolg". Spiegel Online. 16 November 2008.
- "Herrmann und Oehme gewinnen Portimão Global Race". Spiegel Online. 21 June 2009.
- Official Website: The Transat - The North Atlantic Alone (English/French)
