= IMOCA 60 Malizia-Seaexplorer =

Sailing yacht

Malizia-Seaexplorer (3)
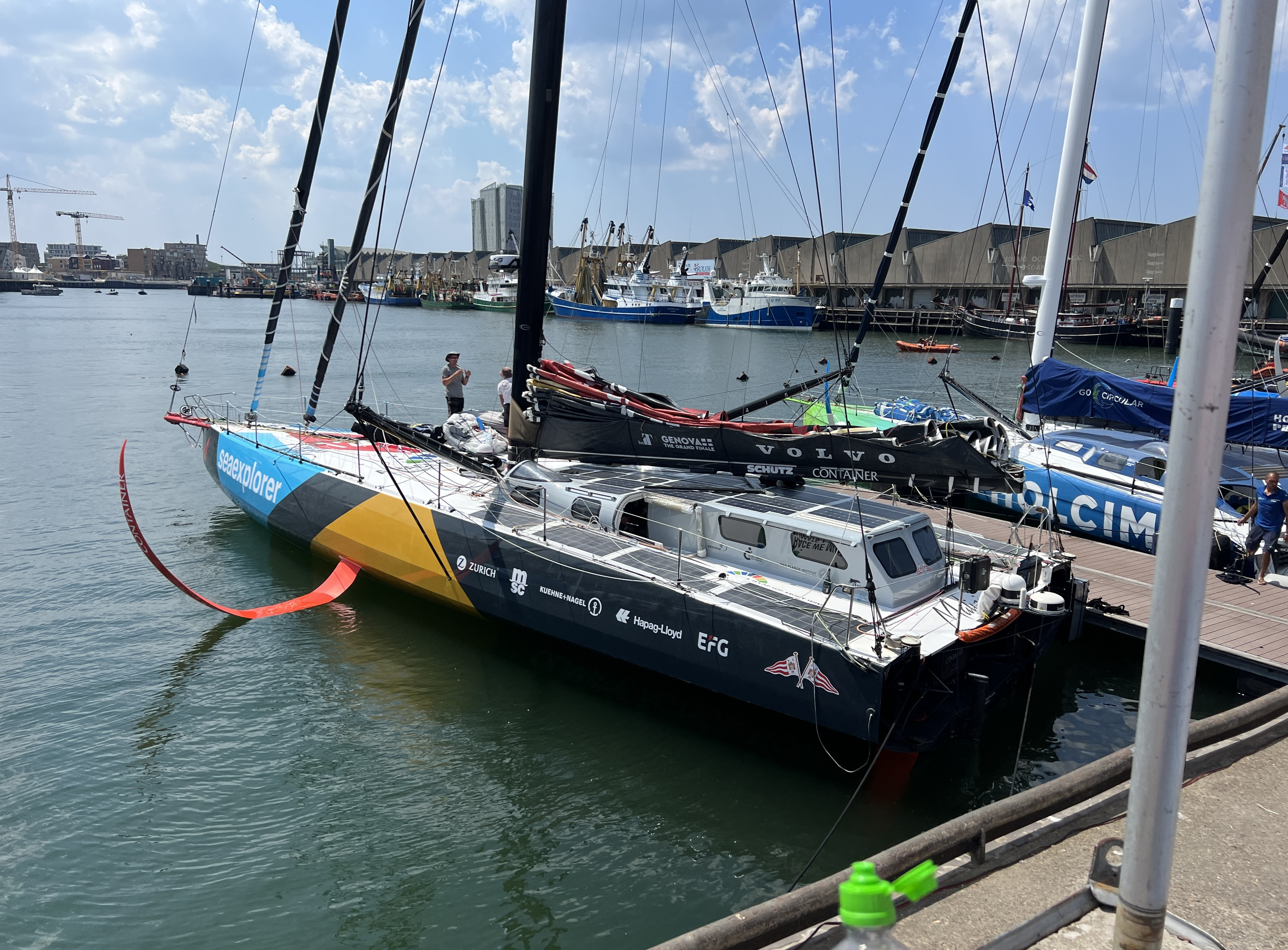

Development
- Designer: VPLP
- Year: 2022
- Builder: Multiplast
- Name: Malizia-Seaexplorer (3)

Boat
- Crew: 1 to 5
- Draft: 4.50 m (14.8 ft)

Hull
- LOA: 18.28 m (60.0 ft)
- Beam: 5.70 m (18.7 ft)

Hull appendages
- General: two rudders, two foils
- Keel: canting keel

Rig
- Mast height: 27.24 m (89.4 ft)

Racing
- Class association: IMOCA 60

Malizia-Seaexplorer (3) or Team Malizia (3), is an IMOCA 60 monohull sailing yacht, designed by VPLP and Boris Herrmann and constructed by Multiplast in France and launched on 19 July 2022. It has been designed for the Vendée Globe 2024, a solo tour of the world, but also participated in The Ocean Race 2023, a crewed around-the-world tour. Its skipper is the German yachtsman Boris Herrmann.

During The Ocean Race 2023, the ship reached a new unofficial 24 hour distance record for monohulls with 640,70 nautical miles travelled.

== Design ==
The first design principle was to build a boat, that performs well in Antarctic ocean on the foils. As a result, the hull is very voluminous in comparison to other IMOCAs of the same generation. This is to add buoyancy to prevent the boat from diving into the waves under heavier conditions and slowing the boat down. A high freeline also adds to the volume, allowing weight saves in the ballast bulb as this improves the boats capability to self-right during a 110° test.

Due to the increasing forces added through the foils and higher speeds, the Malizia-Seaexplorers hull is built from solid carbon fibre without a foam or honeycomb core.

To prevent unnecessary dressing procedures and allow more comfortable sailing the cockpit is fully closed. Additional living area is behind the cockpit adding even more volume to the boat and allowing for more weight in the back, reducing wave diving even more.

Foils: The first generation foils of the boat were damaged during the 2022 Route du Rhum. These were replaced on short-term by foils that were built for another project prior to the start of The Ocean Race. During the 2023/2024 winter refit a new, third set of foils is fitted which implements lessons learned from the previous foil generations.

== Racing history ==
=== 2022 season ===
The 2022 Défi Azimut competition, open only to IMOCA 60 was held in a single handed and a crewed "The Ocean Race" trial to accommodate the teams that would compete in 2023 Ocean Race. The Team Malizia took part in the fully crewed trial in which it finished third of three, behind 11th Hour Ocean Racing and Guyot-Environment with Paul Meilhats Biotherm having to abandon the race.

The international crew consisted of skipper Boris Herrmann, co-skippers Will Harris (GBR), Rosalin Kuiper (NLD) and Nicolas Lunven (FRA) as well as onboard reporter Antoine Auriol (FRA).

In the 2022 single handed Route du Rhum Boris Herrmann with Malizia-Seaexplorer placed 24th of 38 participating IMOCAs. Issues with the foils forced Herrmann to reduce the speed preventing a better position.

=== 2023 The Ocean Race ===
The crew of the Team Malizia (name during The Ocean Race) consisted of skipper Boris Herrmann (leg 1, 3 an 5 to 7), co-skipper and skipper in the legs where Herrmann did not participate Will Harris, co-skipper Rosalin Kuiper (both all legs), co-skipper Nicolas Lunven (Leg 1 to 4 and 7), co-skipper Yann Eliès (leg 2, 5 and 6), co-skipper Christopher Pratt (leg 4) as well as onboard reporter Antoine Auriol (all legs).

The Team finished third overall and second in the in-port series and have won the third, the queens leg through Antarctic ocean from Cape Town to Itajai in Brazil as well as the final leg from The Hague to Genova. With passing Cape Horn on the first place during the third leg they won the Roaring Forties Trophy.

Notable events during the race, were the injuries of Herrmann during the first leg and Kuiper during the third leg. Herrmann severely burned his food with hot water and therefore had to suspend for the second leg due to fears of infection. Kuiper fell out of her bunk during heavy seas and suffered a severe concussion and a cut just over the right eye.

During the fifth leg Team Malizia broke the record of the farthest distance travelled in 24 hours by a monohull sailboat. They managed 640,70 nautical miles, surpassing the record form Holcim-PRB just a few hours before and breaking the record of the super yacht Comanche. The record was not officially recognised by the World Sailing Speed Record Council as it had too little difference to the record of Holcim-PRB established only a few hours earlier.

=== 2023 season ===
In the 2023 Défi Azimut skipper Herrmann and co-skipper Harris placed 7th out of 34 starters in the 48 hour trial. They were again accompanied by onboard reporter Antoine Auriol. In the sprints they reached again the 7th place with three minutes and four seconds to the finish.

2023 Transat Jacques Vabre: Double handed race from Le Havre to Martinique. Boris Herrmann and Will Harris finished seventh with the Malizia-Seaexplorer only a minute behind sixth placed Justine Mettraux on TeamWork.net and within half an hour of the fourth place.

2023 Retour à la base: Single handed. Qualification race for the 2024/2025 Vendée Globe. Boris Herrmann placed fourth with the Malizia-Seaexplorer. During the race Herrmann had to handle issues with the intrusion of water as well as problems with the electricity generator.

=== 2024-2025 Vendée Globe ===
Boris Herrmann scored an overall 12th place with Malizia-Seaexplorer. Having fallen back during the initial days of the race, Herrmann managed to race back into the top 10. After some technical difficulties involving the J2 and a nearby lightning strike, a collision with an unidentified object or animal damaged one of the foils on January 16. This ultimately forced Herrmann to focus on finishing the race in whatever safe fashion still possible.

=== 11th hour racing ===
The boat was sold to 11th hour racing in 2025, for italian-american skipper Francesca Clapcich. Boris Herrmann subsequently announced the construction of a new IMOCA 60.

== Racing results ==
Pos	Year	Race	Class	Boat name	(Co-)Skipper	Configuration, Time, Notes	Ref
Round the world races
12	2024-2025	Vendée Globe	IMOCA 60	Team Malizia	Skipper: Boris Herrmann (GER)	Single handed	
3	2023	The Ocean Race	IMOCA 60	Team Malizia	Skipper: Boris Herrmann (GER), Will Harris (GBR) Co-skippers: Rosalin Kuiper (NLD), Nicolas Lunven (FRA), Yann Eliès (FRA), Christopher Pratt (FRA) OBR: Antoine Auriol (FRA)	Crewed Third overall Second in in-port-series	
Transatlantic Races
2	2024	Transat New York Vendée	IMOCA 60	Malizia-Seaexplorer	Boris Herrmann (GER)	10d 20h 52m 32s	
2	2024	The Transat	IMOCA 60	Malizia-Seaexplorer	Boris Herrmann (GER)	8d 9h 12m 31s	
4	2023	Retour à la base	IMOCA 60	Malizia-Seaexplorer	Boris Herrmann (GER)	Single handed 9d 20h 02m 41s	
7	2023	Transat Jaques Vabre	IMOCA 60	Malizia-Seaexplorer	Boris Herrmann (GER) Will Harris (GBR)	Double handed 12d 09h 01m 03s	
24	2022	Route du Rhum	IMOCA 60	Malizia-Seaexplorer	Boris Herrmann (GER)	Single handed 14d 15h 21m 41s	
Other Races
7	2023	48h Le Défi Azimut	IMOCA 60	Malizia-Seaexplorer	Boris Herrmann (GER) Will Harris (GBR)	Double handed 2d 02h 52m 56s	
3	2022	48h Le Défi Azimut	IMOCA 60	Team Malizia	Boris Herrmann (GER) +crew	In the crewed trials 1d 22h 25m 05s	

== See also ==
- Boris Herrmann (skipper)
