= Transatlantic voyages of Greta Thunberg =

Climate activist's sailing across the Atlantic Ocean

Climate activist Greta Thunberg made a double crossing of the Atlantic Ocean in 2019 to attend climate conferences in New York City and, until it was moved, Santiago, Chile. She sailed from Plymouth, UK, to New York, United States aboard the racing yacht Malizia II (the Italian for "malice"), returning from Hampton, Virginia, to Lisbon on the catamaran La Vagabonde. Thunberg refuses to fly because of the carbon emissions of the airline industry and the trip was announced as carbon neutral. As a racing sailboat, the Malizia II has no toilet, fixed shower, cooking facilities or proper beds.

Thunberg planned to stay in the Americas for some months, attending both the 2019 UN Climate Action Summit in September in New York and the COP 25 climate change conference which was scheduled to be held in Chile in December. However, at the end of October, while she was in the United States, it was decided to move the second event to Spain because of the 2019 Chilean protests. She arranged to make the return voyage on board the catamaran La Vagabonde, departing on 13 November and arriving at the Port of Lisbon on 3 December 2019.

== Background ==
Thunberg, at the time of the crossings a sixteen-year-old Swedish student, is credited with raising global awareness of the risks posed by climate change and holding politicians accountable for their lack of action on what she and other activists and scientists see as a climate crisis. At the start of the 2018–2019 school year, Thunberg began spending school days outside the Swedish Parliament demanding aggressive action to reduce the risks from future global warming. In various places around the world, others soon joined her protests and Thunberg started giving speeches to various assemblies of government leaders. However, she has renounced at least one award and numerous speaking invitations to reduce her own carbon footprint; Thunberg does not fly except for emergency cases.

In April 2019, Thunberg was contemplating what she would do if she were invited to speak at either the 2019 UN Climate Action Summit in New York or the 2019 United Nations Climate Change Conference in Santiago, Chile. Appearing at either event would require her to travel across the Atlantic Ocean. She told reporters that although she would not fly, she might sail by way of container ship, since she believed that would have the smallest carbon footprint.

On 31 May 2019, Greta Thunberg announced during a Fridays for Future event in Vienna, Austria, that she would take a sabbatical year from school (as compulsory education in Sweden ends at 16), and instead attend the climate conferences in America.

By 31 June 2019 she had received invitations and shared with reporters her determination but lack of specific plans. Shortly after, the crew of the Malizia II, a monohull sailing yacht, offered passage to Thunberg and her father, Svante Thunberg, on board their vessel.

== Plymouth to New York ==
On 14 August 2019 Thunberg left Plymouth, UK for New York City 3,500 miles (5,600 km) away, arriving on 28 August, one day later than the anticipated arrival date due to rough seas.

Thunberg sailed on board the Malizia II, a 18 m (60 ft) racing yacht that was built for round-the-world challenges. Solar panels and underwater turbines generate the power for lighting and communication. Designed for speed rather than luxury, conditions range from basic to difficult, for example the boat has no kitchen, toilet, or shower. The yacht carried a sail marked with #FridaysForFuture while its mainsail was emblazoned with "Unite Behind the Science."

During the voyage, Thunberg and Boris Herrmann communicated with the world outside using social media. As 16 and 23 August were Fridays, Thunberg stood with her "Skolstrejk för klimatet" sign onboard both those days.

In a September 2019 interview with Democracy Now, she described encountering dolphins and seeing the stars of the Milky Way band in the night sky.

Upon arriving Thunberg was greeted by hundreds of supporters and over a hundred fellow American climate youth strikers including 14-year-old Alexandria Villaseñor, who founded the climate change education group Earth Uprising. Following a short speech, Thunberg held a brief question/answer session. When asked for a message for President Trump she replied, "Listen to the science, he obviously doesn't do that."

At the time, Thunberg said she did not know how she would return to Europe, and it was unclear how long she would stay in the Americas. In July the BBC reported she intended to stay for nine months, and in August The i described her stay as four months.

== Hampton to Lisbon ==
Thunberg had intended to remain in the Americas in order to travel overland to attend the United Nations Climate Change Conference (COP25) in Santiago, Chile, in December. However, it was announced at short notice that COP25 was to be moved to Madrid, Spain, because of serious public unrest in Chile. Thunberg posted on social media in search of a ride across the Atlantic Ocean. Riley Whitelum and Elayna Carausu, an Australian couple who had been sailing around the world aboard their 48-foot (15 m) catamaran, La Vagabonde, offered to take her, assisted by professional yacht skipper Nikki Henderson. On 13 November 2019, Thunberg and her father set sail from Hampton, Virginia for Lisbon, Portugal. Her departing message was the same as it has been since she began her activism: "My message to the Americans is the same as to everyone – that is to unite behind the science and to act on the science."

Thunberg arrived in the Port of Lisbon on 3 December 2019, then travelled to Madrid to speak at COP25 where she called for more "concrete action," arguing that the global wave of school strikes over the previous year had "achieved nothing", as greenhouse gas emissions were still rising – by 4% since 2015.

=== Flygskam ===
The trans-Atlantic voyages have greatly helped to promote the Flygskam movement. Flygskam, translated as flight shame or flight conscience, is social pressure not to fly because of the rising greenhouse gas emissions of the airline industry. It was originally championed by Swedish Olympic athlete Björn Ferry but gained significant momentum after Thunberg's well-publicised refusal to fly on environmental grounds, especially the trans-Atlantic voyages, inspiring many people to adopt it. Sweden has reported a 4% drop in domestic travel for 2019 and a 9% increase in rail use. The BBC claims that the movement could halve the growth of global air travel.
