= Greta Thunberg boat =

Greta Thunberg boat could refer to:

- Gitana 16#Greta Thunberg Transatlantic Voyage, in 2019
- June 2025 Gaza Freedom Flotilla
