= Felix Oehme =

German yachtsman

Felix Oehme (born 1981) is a German yachtsman.

== Sportive successes ==
End of 2006, Oehme sailed with a five-man crew in the Atlantic and received the second prize of the Stiftung Hochseesegeln (Foundation for High Seas Sailing) for this performance. In September 2006 and 2008 he successfully represented Germany at the World University Match race. Furthermore, he ranked among the top five in several international races for class 49 boats, including the national German championship.

On November 16, 2008 Oehme and his co-skipper Boris Herrmann, forming the Beluga Offshore Sailing Team, won the Portimão Global Ocean Race, a five-leg regatta around the world for class 40 boats. This makes them the first German professional team on a German yacht to win a leg of an international trans-ocean race and the whole race itself.
