= Malizia =

The name Malizia might mean:

- Malicious (1973 film) (Malizia), an Italian comedy starring Laura Antonelli
- Malizia II, a 21st-century sports sailing boat that was used by Greta Thunberg for crossing the North Atlantic for joining a climate conference.
