= IMOCA 60 PRB 5 =

Sailboat

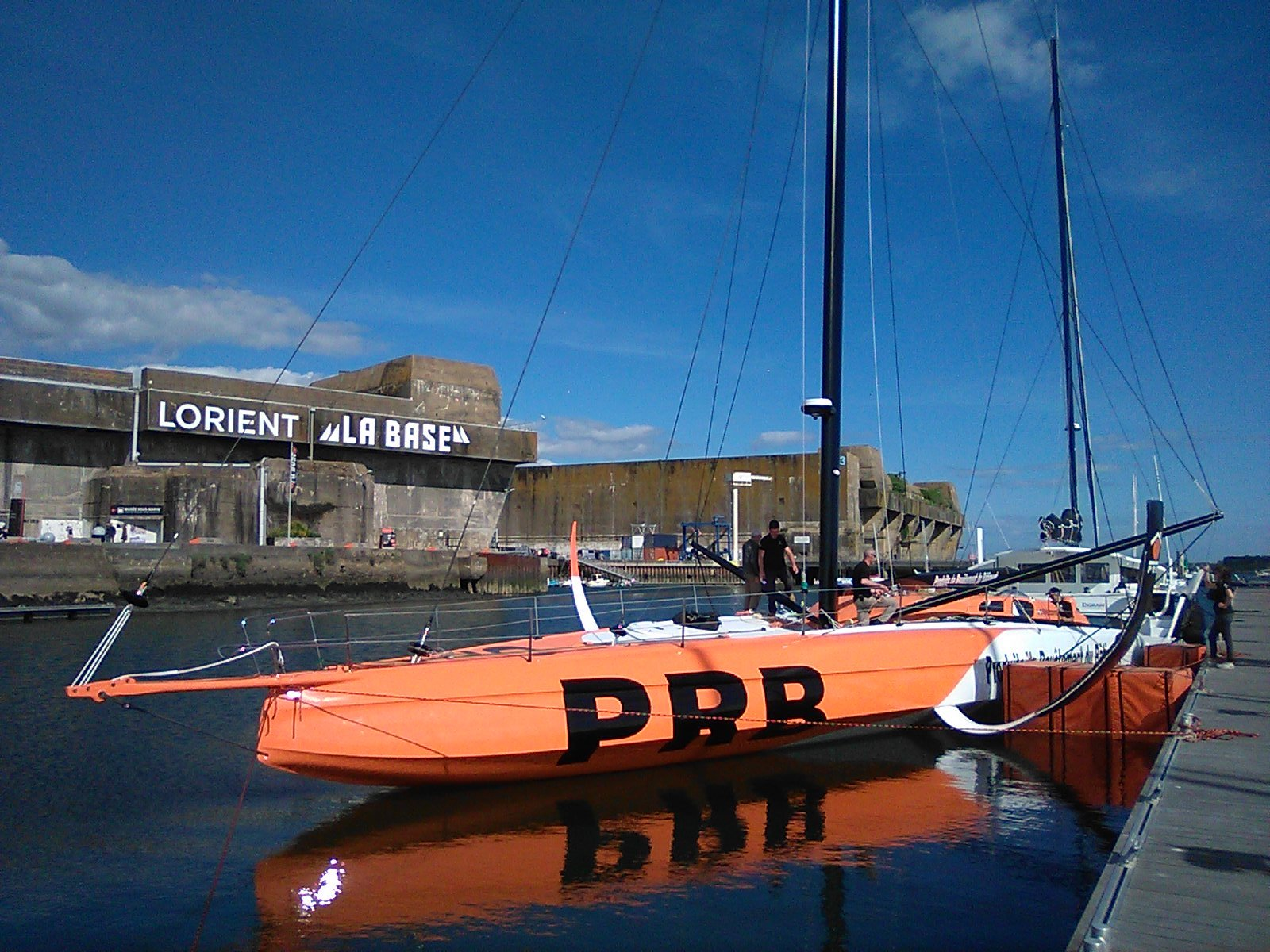

Development
- Designer: Guillaume Verdier
- Year: 8 May 2022
- Builder: Carrington Boats Ltd

Racing
- Class association: IMOCA 60

The IMOCA 60 class yacht Holcim - PRB originally launched as PRB (5) was designed by Guillaume Verdier, built by Carrington Boats in Hythe, England, and launched in 2022. The boat was shipped to France for final fitout. The hull was moulded for an Ocean Race project that was cancelled during the COVID-19 pandemic. The PRB team used the parts completed as a way to accelerate their build process and get back out on the water following the sinking of PRB 4 on 30 November, 2020.

== History ==
=== 2023 The Ocean Race ===
Crew:

- Skippers: Kevin Escoffier (FRA) (leg 1 - 5), Benjamin Schwartz (FRA) (leg 6 & 7)
- Crew Members: Abby Ehler (GBR), Sam Goodchild (GBR), Fabien Delahaye (FRA), Susann Beucke (GER), Tom Laperche (FRA), Annemieke Bes (NED), Charles Caudrelier (FRA), Yoann Richomme (FRA), Martin Le Pape (FRA), Ambrogio Beccaria (ITA)
- Onboard Reporter: Julien Champolion, Georgia Schofield, Yann Riou

== Racing results ==
Pos	Year	Race	Class	Boat name	(Co-)Skipper	Configuration, Time, Notes	Ref
Round the world races
2	2024	Vendee Globe	IMOCA 60	Holcim - PRB	Nicolas Lunven (FRA)	75d 07h 49m 41s	
2	2023	The Ocean Race	IMOCA 60	Holcim - PRB	Kevin Escoffier (FRA) Benjamin Schwartz (FRA)	Crewed	
Transatlantic Races
8	2023	Retour à la base	IMOCA 60	Holcim - PRB	Nicolas Lunven (FRA)	solo; 10d 11h 28m 54s	
4	2022	Route du Rhum	IMOCA 60	Holcim - PRB	Kevin Escoffier (FRA)	solo; 11d 23h 31m 14s	
Other Races
5	2022	48h Le Défi Azimut	IMOCA 60	Holcim - PRB	Kevin Escoffier (FRA)		
