= Francesca Clapcich =

Italian sports sailor

Personal information
- Nationality: Italian | American
- Born: 28 January 1988 (age 38) Trieste, Italy

Sailing career
- Sport: Sailing
Medal record
Offshore Racing
Gold medal – first place	2023 The Ocean Race	IMOCA
Silver medal – second place	2025 The Transat Café L'OR	IMOCA
World Championships
Gold medal – first place	2015 Argentina	49er FX
Bronze medal – third place	2014 Santander	49er FX
European Championships
Gold medal – first place	2015 European Championship	49er FX
Silver medal – second place	2016 European Championship	49er FX
World Cup
Silver medal – second place	2015 Olympic Test Event	49er FX
Bronze medal – third place	2014 World Cup Final	49er FX
Silver medal – second place	2015 World Cup Miami	49er FX
Bronze medal – third place	2015 World Cup Hyères	49er FX
Gold medal – first place	2015 Eurosaf Riva del Garda	49er FX

Francesca Clapcich (born 28 January 1988 in Trieste) is an Italian/American professional sailor, with World, European, and National Championship titles to her name. She is the first and only Italian to win The Ocean Race, the round the world yacht race. Clapcich is widely regarded as one of the most versatile sailors in the world, having competed at the highest levels across Olympic classes, match racing, and offshore ocean racing.

== Career ==
=== Inshore Racing ===
Clapcich represented Italy in two Summer Olympics:

- London 2012: competed in the women's Laser Radial class, finishing 19th.
- Rio 2016: competed in the women's 49erFX class with Giulia Conti, finishing 5th.

In 2015, Clapcich and Conti achieved a historic 'Triple Crown', winning the World, European, and Italian Championships in the 49erFX class. For these achievements, they were awarded the Collare d'Oro al Merito Sportivo (Golden Collar for Sporting Merit) - also known as Italian Sailor of the Year - on 27 October 2015, the highest honour conferred by the Italian National Olympic Committee (CONI). In 2016 they came second at the European Championships.

In 2021 she became the first Italian woman to compete in the Solitaire du Figaro offshore sailing circuit, where she finished 25th, winning the ‘Fighting Spirit’ award.

In 2024, Clapcich further expanded her repertoire by joining the US team American Magic for the inaugural Puig Women’s America’s Cup in Barcelona.

=== Offshore Racing ===
In 2017–18, Clapcich made her offshore debut as a crew member on Turn the Tide on Plastic in the Volvo Ocean Race (now The Ocean Race), skippered by Dee Caffari.

Her historic victory came in the 2022–23 edition of The Ocean Race, where she was a key crew member on 11th Hour Racing Team, the overall winners. This made her the first Italian in the 53 year history of the race to lift the trophy. In 2024 she joined UpWind by MerConcept, an innovative all-female scouting and training program launched in collaboration with MerConcept with 11th Hour Racing as sponsor. This initiative aims to bridge the gender gap in offshore racing by providing female sailors with professional opportunities to compete at the highest level on Ocean Fifty multihulls.

MerConcept Racing Director Cécile Andrieu commented that Clapcich, the first Italian to win The Ocean Race, would bring skill, passion, and determination to the project. Andrieu also noted her commitment to diversity and inclusion, emphasizing that under her leadership, UpWind aims to foster a sailing community that is welcoming and accessible to all.

The inaugural squad, led by Francesca, featured a diverse group of international talent including Anne-Claire Le Berre (FRA) and Elodie-Jane Mettraux (SUI). The team's debut season in the 2024 Ocean Fifty Series served as a high-performance training ground, a momentum carried into the 2025 season, where the team established itself as a consistent contender, notably climbing to 6th place in the overall championship standings following strong performances in the early Acts of the Ocean Fifty Series.

In February 2025, Francesca transitioned to the role of Ambassador and Mentor, handing over the helm to Anne-Claire Le Berre as the team's new skipper. In this new capacity, she continues to provide strategic guidance and advocacy for the program.

=== Current campaign - Team Francesca Clapcich Powered by 11th Hour Racing ===
In January 2024 it was announced that Francesca would be powered by 11th Hour Racing as a sponsored athlete to join its global initiatives for a more inclusive and sustainable future. Clapcich announced her desire to further advance efforts in cultivating a safe, diverse, and equitable environment within the sailing industry. In March 2025, Clapcich announced the launch of Team Francesca Clapcich Powered by 11th Hour Racing, a solo offshore campaign aimed at the 2028 Vendée Globe - a non-stop, unassisted solo round-the-world race.

In October 2025, she purchased the 60-foot IMOCA Malizia-Seaexplorer the vessel that set the 24-hour distance record in 2023 by Boris Herrmann and Team Malizia). Should she complete the Vendée Globe, she will become the first person in history to compete in sailing’s 'Big Four': the Olympic Games, The Ocean Race, the America’s Cup in the women's competition, and the Vendée Globe.

=== 2025 racing results ===
- Transat Café L’OR 2025: In November 2025, Clapcich and co-skipper Will Harris secured a historic second place in the IMOCA Class. This was the best result for a woman in the Class in 20 years since Dame Ellen MacArthur also finished second in 2005; the best result for an international pairing in the French-dominated IMOCA Class since 2011; and she was the first American woman and first Italian woman ever to compete in the race.
- IMOCA Globe Series: Clapcich concluded the 2025 season ranked 5th in the global annual standings for IMOCA skippers.

=== 2026 racing calendar ===
In January 2026, the team announced that Italian offshore veteran Alberto Bona had joined the campaign as co-skipper and Sailing Performance Manager.

The 2026 season includes four major offshore races as part of her IMOCA Globe Series campaign leading toward the 2028 Vendée Globe.

- 1000 Race (May 3, 2026): A 1,000-nautical-mile solo sprint starting from Port-la-Forêt, France.
- Vendée Arctique-Les Sables d’Olonne (June 7, 2026): A 3,000-nautical-mile solo race toward the Arctic Circle and qualifier for the Vendée Globe.
- The Ocean Race Atlantic (Sept 2, 2026): A crewed transatlantic race from NYC to Europe, with 11th Hour Racing as the event’s Impact Partner.
- Route du Rhum-Destination Guadeloupe (Nov 1, 2026): A 3,500-nautical-mile solo race from Saint-Malo to Pointe-à-Pitre, Guadeloupe, and a qualifier for the Vendée Globe.

== Racing CV ==
=== Offshore ===
2nd The Transat Café L’OR 2025 IMOCA

4th The Ocean Race Europe 2025 IMOCA

4th Course des Caps 2025 IMOCA

5th IMOCA Globe Series 2025

9th Ocean fifty Series Championship 2024 Ocean Fifty

1st The Ocean Race 2023 IMOCA

25th La Solitaire du Figaro 2021 Figaro Class

6th Volvo Ocean Race 2017-18 VO65

=== Inshore ===
5th in Group A Puig Women’s America’s Cup 2024 AC40

=== Worlds and Olympic Games ===
World Champion 2015 49er FX

3rd World Championship 2014 49er FX

4th World Championship 2013 49er FX

5th World Championship 2016 49er FX

10th World Championship 2009 Laser Radial

19th Olympic Games 2012 Laser Radial

5th Olympic Games 2016 49er FX

=== Europeans ===
European Champion 2015 49er FX

2nd European Championship 2016 49er FX

4th European Championship 2013 49er FX

=== World Cup ===
2nd Olympic Games TEST EVENT 2015 49er FX

3rd World Cup Final 2014 49er FX

2nd World Cup Miami 2015 49er FX

3rd World Cup Hyeres 2015 49er FX

1st Eurosaf Riva del Garda 2015 49er FX

Top 10 in World cup regattas in Laser Radial and 49er FX

Other sports

1st place Spanish Throwdown Crossfit 2016

3d place F1 Granfondo bicycle 2016

3rd place S2 Olympic Triathlon distance Grado 2016

3rd place S1 Half Ironman Lanzarote 2012

== Activism and Social Impact ==
Clapcich is a prominent advocate for diversity, equity, and inclusion (DEI) in sailing. Through her 'Believe, Belong, Achieve' initiative, she works to break down cultural barriers for underrepresented groups in the sport. Her team runs a Sailing Instructor Program to introduce the concepts of belonging at grassroots sailing clubs and organizations and also the Believe, Belong, Achieve peer-to-peer workshops. She is also a vocal supporter of LGBTQ+ rights and ocean sustainability, collaborating with 11th Hour Racing on global environmental and social justice initiatives.

In November 2025, she published her autobiography in Italian, Un’onda alla volta ('One Wave at a Time'), detailing her journey from Olympic dinghies to the Southern Ocean and her fight for civil rights in sport.

== Awards and honors ==
In 2015, Clapcich and Conti achieved a historic 'Triple Crown', winning the World, European, and Italian Championships in the 49erFX class. For these achievements, they were awarded the Collare d'Oro al Merito Sportivo (Golden Collar for Sporting Merit) - also known as Italian Sailor of the Year - on 27 October 2015, the highest honour conferred by the Italian National Olympic Committee (CONI).

In May 2024 it was announced that Francesca had been shortlisted for two Italian Sailor of the Year Awards - by the Italian Sailing Federation and the Giornale della Vela.

In 2021 she became the first Italian woman to compete in the Solitaire du Figaro offshore sailing circuit, where she finished 25th, winning the ‘Fighting Spirit’ award.

While a serving member of the Italian Air Force, Clapcich was awarded the Gold Star Air Force award.

== Personal life ==
Based in the mountains of Park City, Utah, Francesca Clapcich leads a life defined by high-performance and community service. When she isn’t at sea, she is a dedicated mother to her daughter, Harriet, and an active member of Summit Pride.

Francesca is a Level 3 PSIA Alpine Ski Instructor - the highest qualification in the U.S. - and a specialist in children’s instruction. Her expertise in human performance is backed by a Bachelor’s degree in Sport Science from the University of Urbino, followed by a specialized Masters in Nutrition and Sport from San Raffaele University in Rome. As an Advanced Emergency Medical Technician (EMT) and a certified coach in CrossFit, Weightlifting, and Functional Training, she applies the same rigorous physical and mental preparation to her life on land as she does to elite offshore racing. Beyond her athletic pursuits, Francesca is a powerful voice for change in the sporting world. She serves as a sponsored athlete for 11th Hour Racing, championing ocean health, social justice and sustainability, and acts as a Mentor and Ambassador for UpWind by MerConcept. She is an active supporter of The Magenta Project, where she helps drive equity and inclusion in sailing. She is an athlete ambassador to Protect Our Winters and their Water Alliance, and is also a eco champion for EcoAthletes, leveraging her dual expertise in the mountains and on the ocean to advocate for environmental preservation.

Francesca lives in Park City, Utah, with her daughter, Harriet.
