= IMOCA 60 PRB 4 =

Sailboat

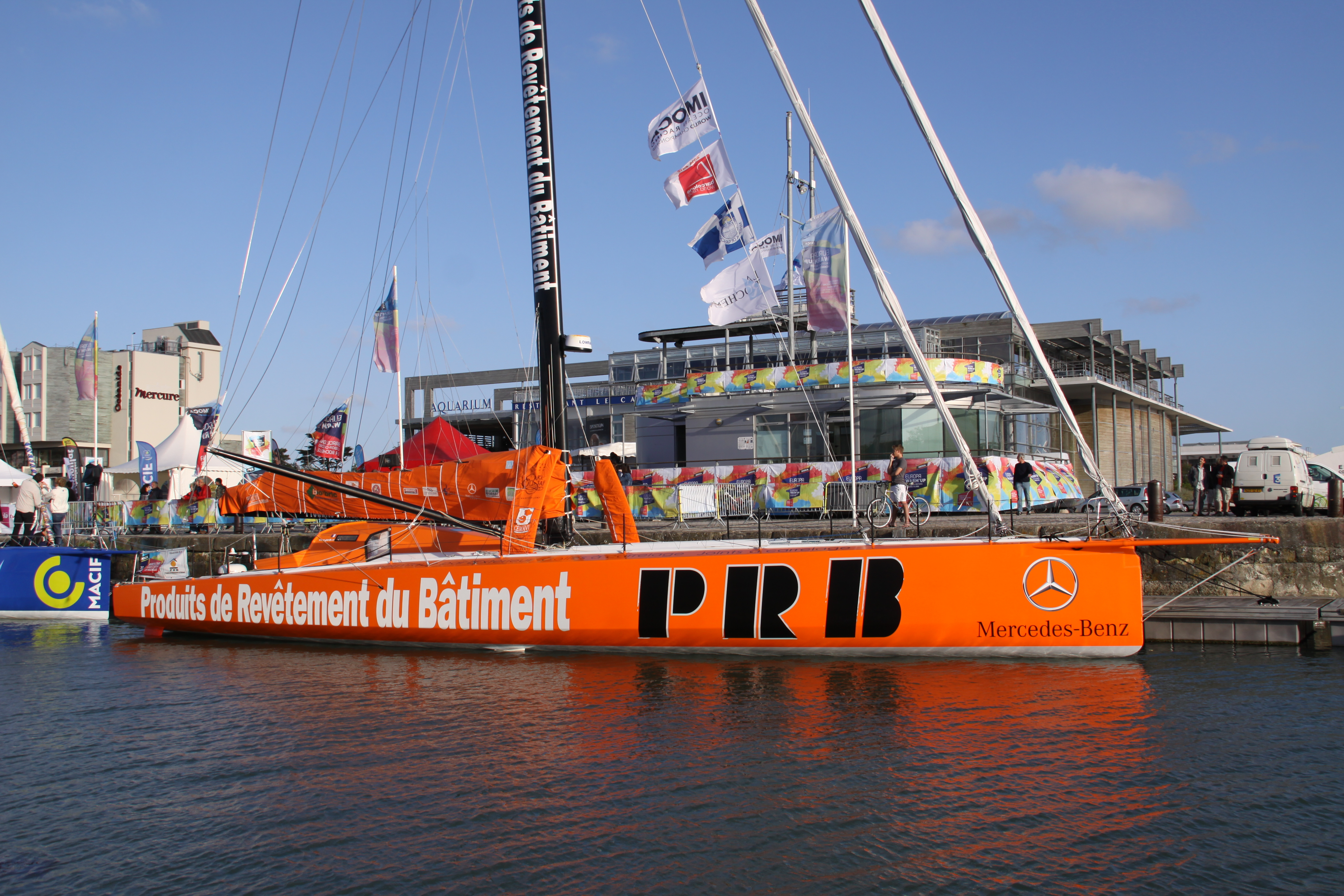

Development
- Designer: VPLP Design, Guillaume Verdier Design Office, Guillaume Verdier
- Year: 30 November 2009

Hull
- Hull weight: Carbon Sandwich

Hull appendages
- Keel: Canting Keel
- Rudder: Twin Rudders

Rig
- Rig type: Rotating Mast with Deck Spreaders

Racing
- Class association: IMOCA 60

The IMOCA 60 class yacht PRB 4 was designed by Lauriot-Prévost and G. Verdier and launched in 2010 after being assembled by CDK Technologies based in Lorient, France. The hull was moulded in those of Safran and manufactured at the Larros Shipyard in Gujan Mestras under the direction of Thierry Elluère. The deck will was made at CDK technologies in Port la Forêt. In Italy, near Milan, Refraschini manufacture the internal structure of the boat. The initial keel was made by AMPM, Mothe Achard.

While sailing in the 2020-2021 Vendée Globe with French skipper Kevin Escoffier, who reported issues with a valve at the starboard foil on the 22 November, it suddenly sank on the 30 November, 2000 kilometers south-west of Cape of Good Hope. At the time the skipper was in the third place and was found in his life raft by skipper Jean Le Cam, who was only thirty miles behind him, when Escoffier triggered his emergency beacon. Jean Le Cam was saved in the 2008-2009 Vendée Globe by none other than PRB 3 skipper Vincent Riou at Cape Horn. After having found Escoffier, Jean Le Cam lost visual contact with him as night fell. Eventually, three boats were searching for Escoffier, who was rescued by Le Cam the following morning.

== Racing results ==
Pos	Year	Race	Class	Boat name	Skipper	Notes	Ref
Round the world races
DNF	2020	2020–2021 Vendée Globe	IMOCA 60	PRB 4	Kevin Escoffier (FRA)	Boat Broke Up and Sank	
RET	2016	2016–2017 Vendée Globe	IMOCA 60	PRB 4	Vincent Riou (FRA)	Day 17: Damaged keel – South Atlantic	
RET	2012	2012–2013 Vendée Globe	IMOCA 60	PRB 4	Vincent Riou (FRA)	Day 14: broken outrigger stay resulting from collision	
Transatlantic Races
Other Races
