= Paul Meilhat =

French offshore sailor and navigator

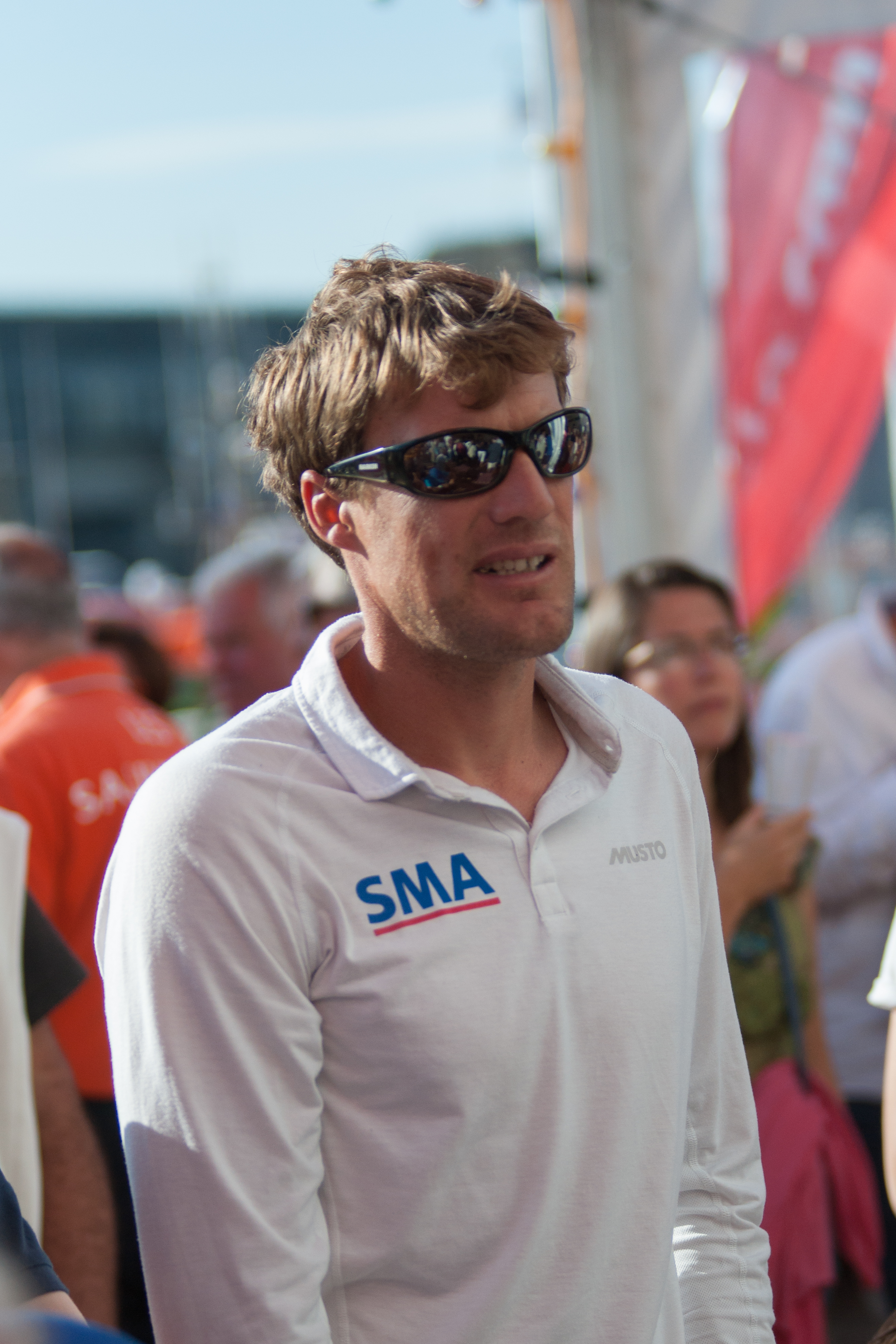

Personal information
- Nationality: French
- Born: 17 May 1982 (age 44)

Sailing career
- Sport: Sailing
- Club: Brest Bretagne Nautisme

Paul Meilhat (born 17 May 1982) is a French sailor and navigator. He was a high level 49er dinghy sailor with Olympic aspirations before moving into offshore sailing. From 2015 to the end of 2018 he was skipper of the IMOCA 60 - SMA and competed in the Vendée Globe.

== Rankings ==
2019:

- 7th - Transat Jaque Vabre on Initiatives cœur with Sam Davies
- 7th - Défi Azimut
- 5th - Rolex Fastnet Race

2018:

- winner of the Route du Rhum - Destination Guadeloupe in the IMOCA category on SMA in 12 days, 11 hours, 23 minutes and 18 seconds; 6th overall
- winner of the Monaco Globes series, doubles with Gwénolé Gahinet
- winner of the Bermuda 1000 Race - Douarnenez Cascais

2017:

- winner of the Rolex Fastnet Race, doubles with Gwénolé Gahinet on IMOCA SMA
- 2nd in the Transat Jacques Vabre, doubles with Gwénolé Gahinet on IMOCA SMA
- RET for the 2016-2017 Vendée Globe with keel issues

2016:

- 4th in the Transat New York-Vendée.
- 4th in The Transat

2015:

- winner of the SNSM record, doubles with Michel Desjoyeaux, in 37 hours, 4 minutes and 23 seconds

2014:

- 1st - Transat AG2R with Gwénolé Gahinet on "Safran Guy Cotten"

2012:

- 4th - Transat AG2R with Fabien Delahaye on "Macif"

2007

- 31st - ISAF Sailing World Championships Cascais, POR

2006

- 34th - 49er World Championship - Aix Les Bains, FRA

2005

- 29th - 49er World Championship, Moscow, RUS

2004

- 68th - 49er World Championship (Olympic Qualifier), Athens, GRE
