= Gitana 16 =

Sailboat

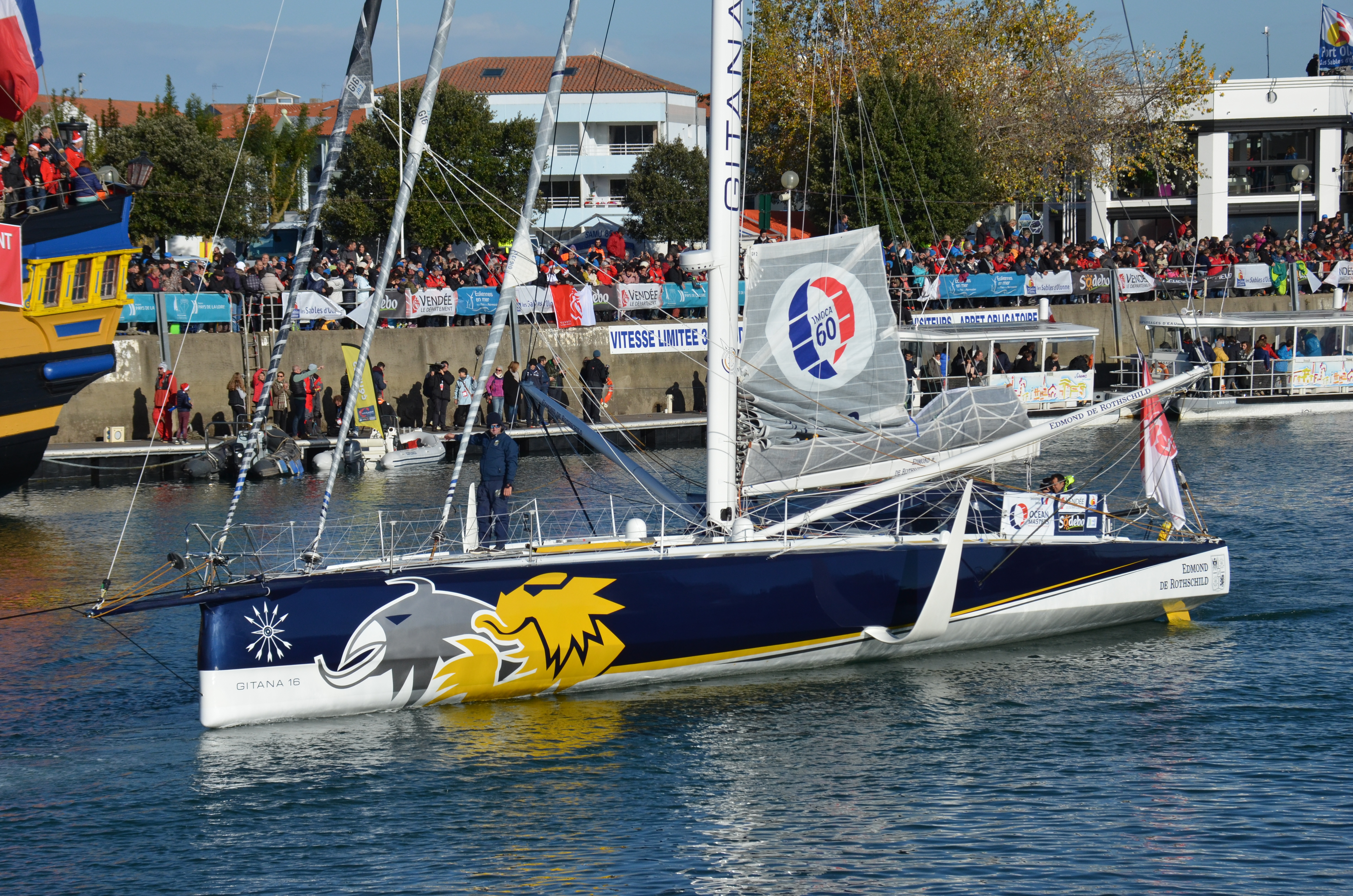

Development
- Designer: VPLP Design, Guillaume Verdier
- Year: 7 August 2015
- Builder: Multiplast

Boat
- Displacement: 8,000 kg (18,000 lb)
- Draft: 4.5 m (15 ft)

Hull
- Hull weight: Carbon Nomex Sandwich
- Beam: 5.70 m (18.7 ft)

Hull appendages
- Keel: Canting Keel
- Ballast: Water Ballast
- Rudder: Twin Rudders

Rig
- Rig type: Rotating Mast with Deck Spreaders

Racing
- Class association: IMOCA 60

Gitana 16, her name when launched, is an IMOCA 60 monohull sailing yacht, designed by VPLP and Guillaume Verdier and constructed by Multiplast in France. She was later known as Malizia II. The yacht's hull has a tumblehome shape and is equipped with foils, which were upgraded in 2016 and again in 2020. The boat was commissioned for the Gitana Sailing Team founded by French banker Benjamin de Rothschild. Her first skipper was Sébastien Josse who was later replaced by Boris Herrmann. The yacht does not use any fossil fuel for power. In 2019, solar panels with an output of 1.3 kW were installed, and power is also generated by two hydro-electric generators at the stern that can be raised and lowered as needed.

== Ownership ==
=== 2015–2017 - Gitana 16, FRA 16 ===
The yacht was commissioned for the Gitana Sailing Team, founded by Benjamin de Rothschild. She competed in the 2016–2017 Vendée Globe with French Skipper Sébastien Josse but did not finish the race, due to a foil shaft problem.

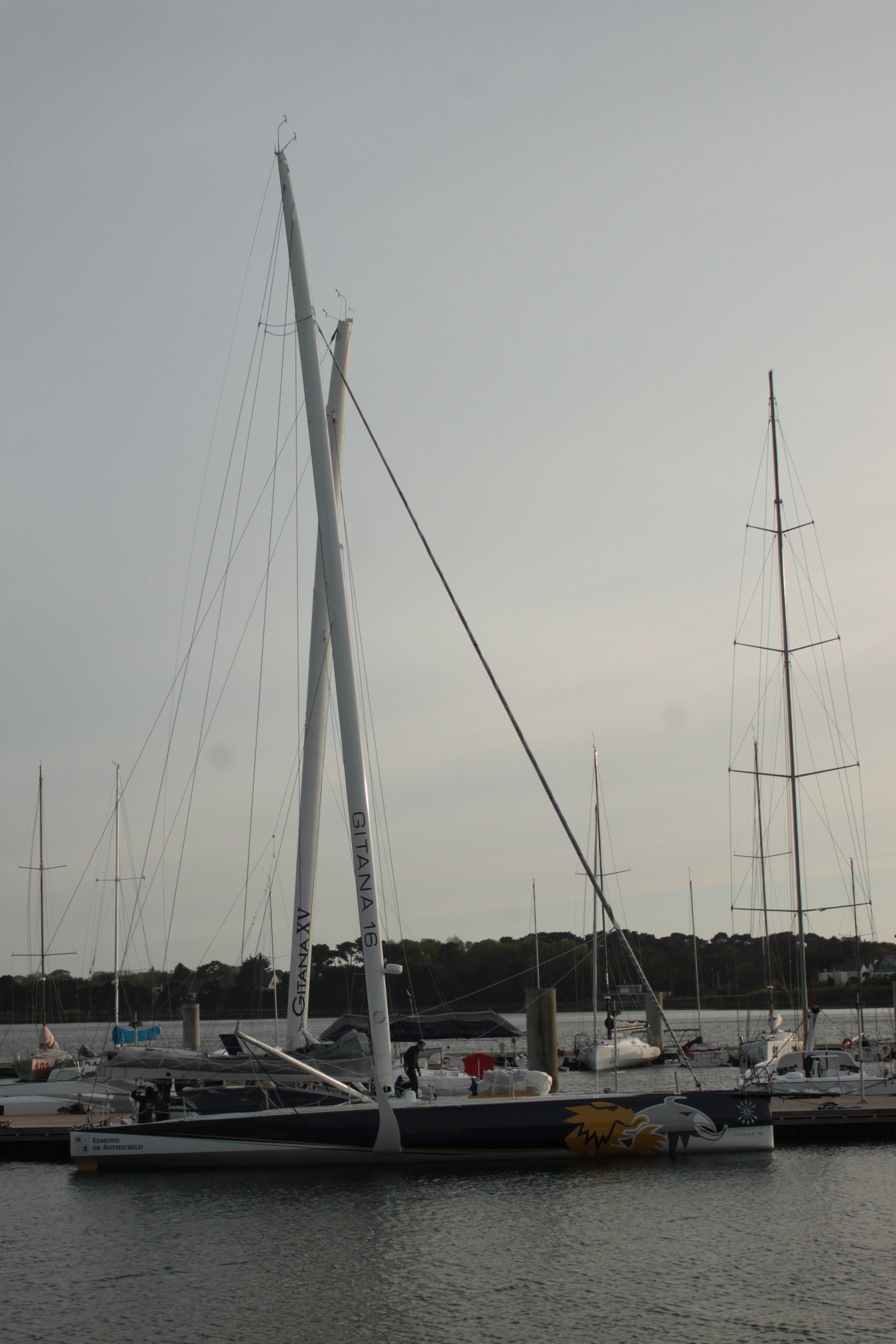

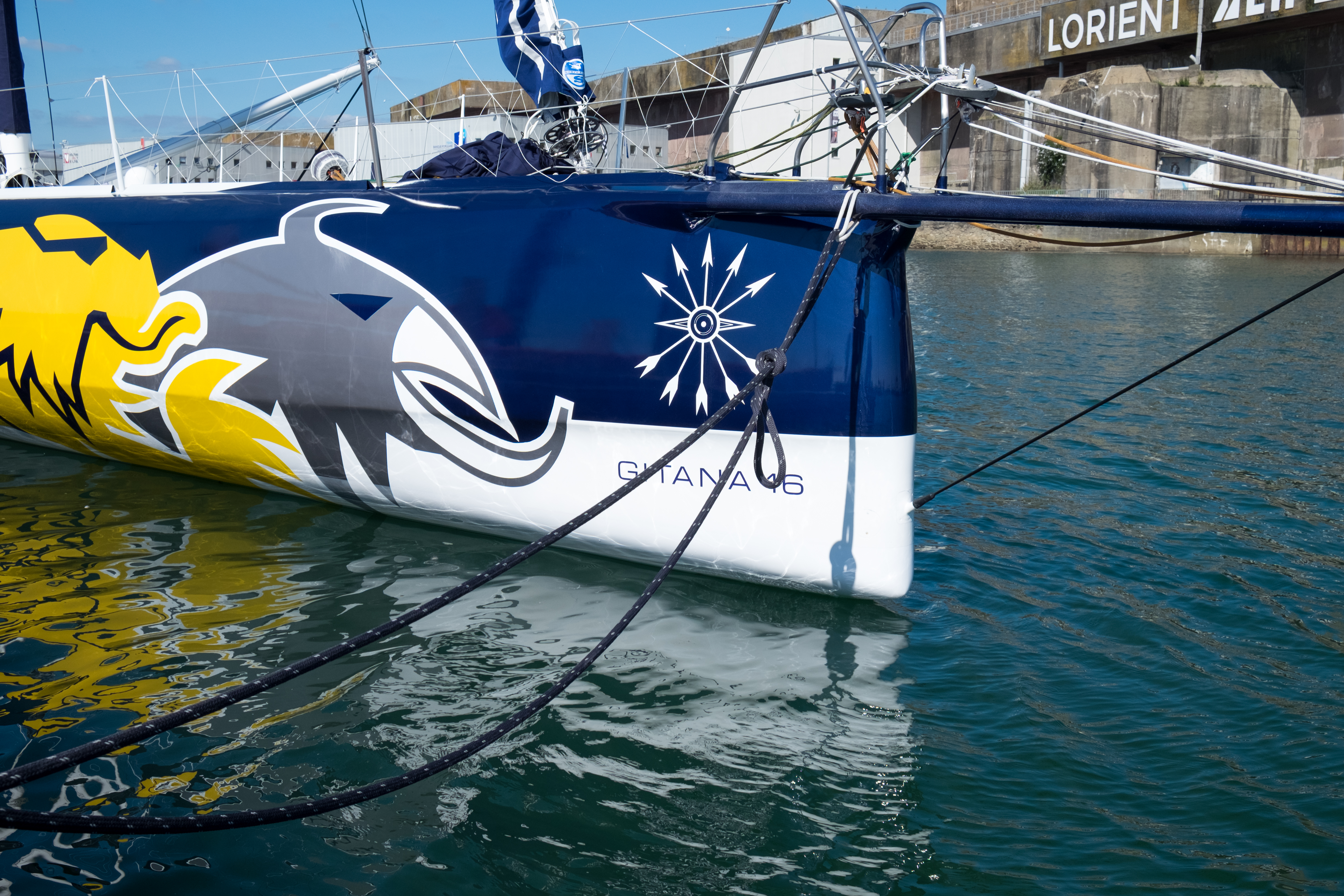

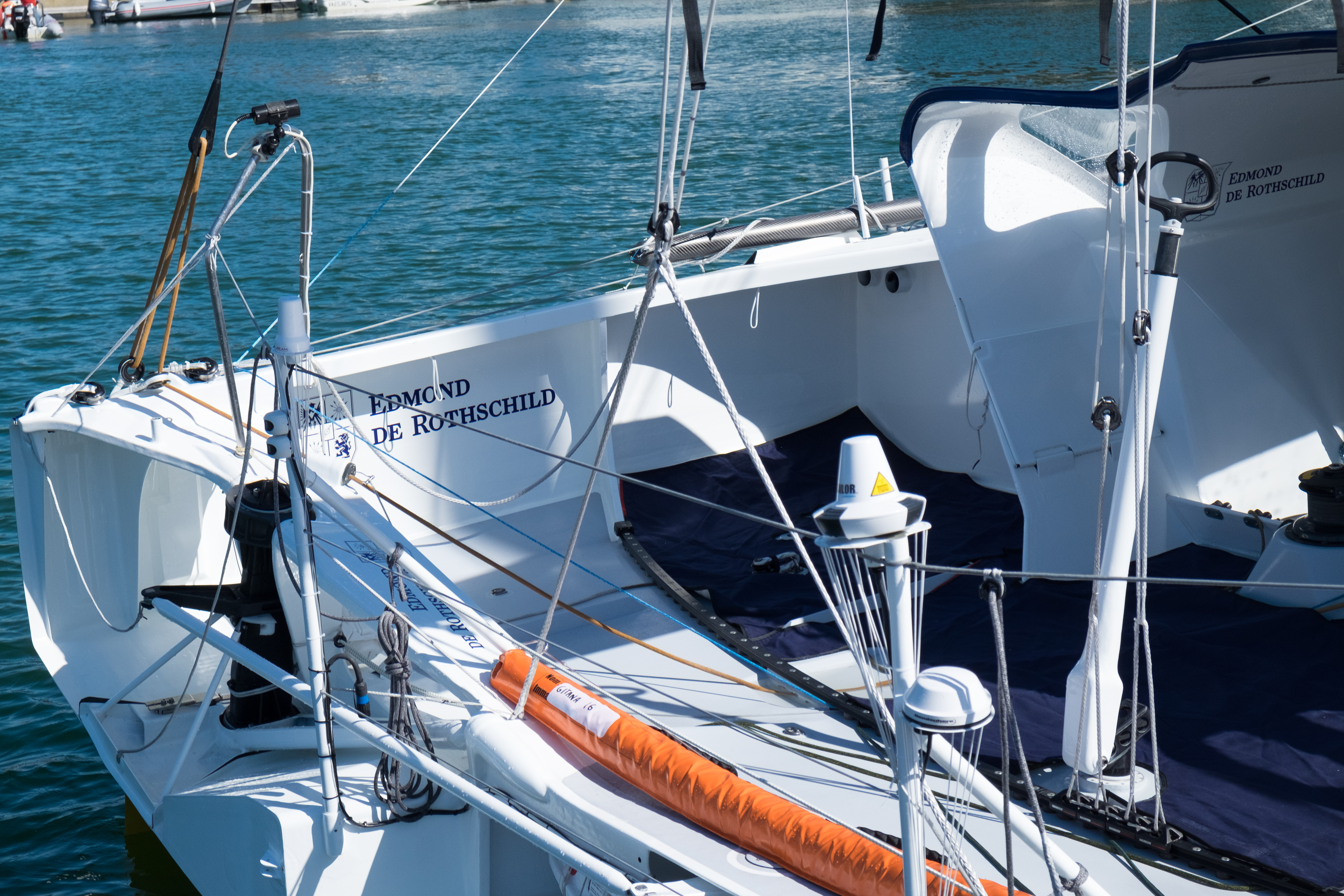

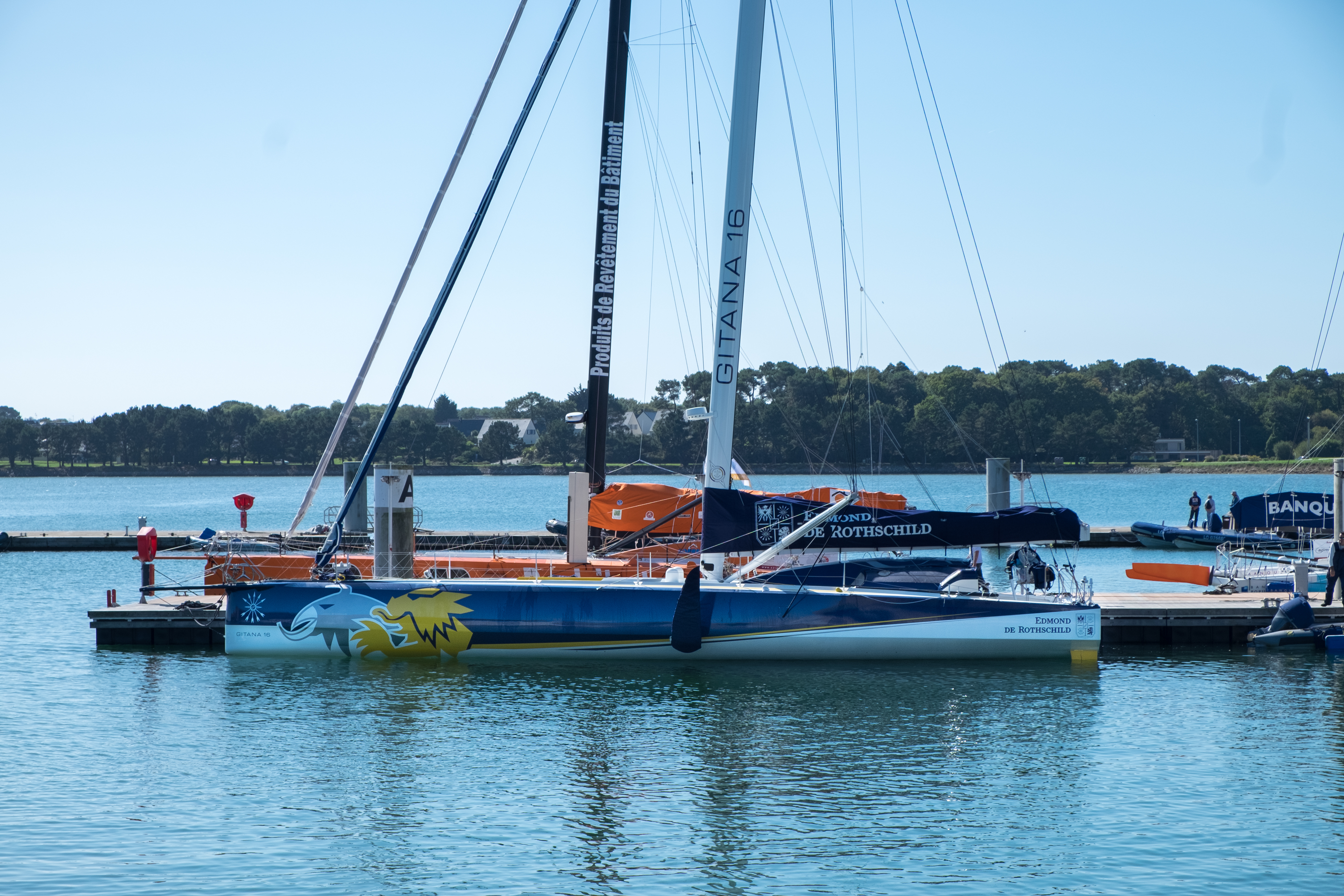

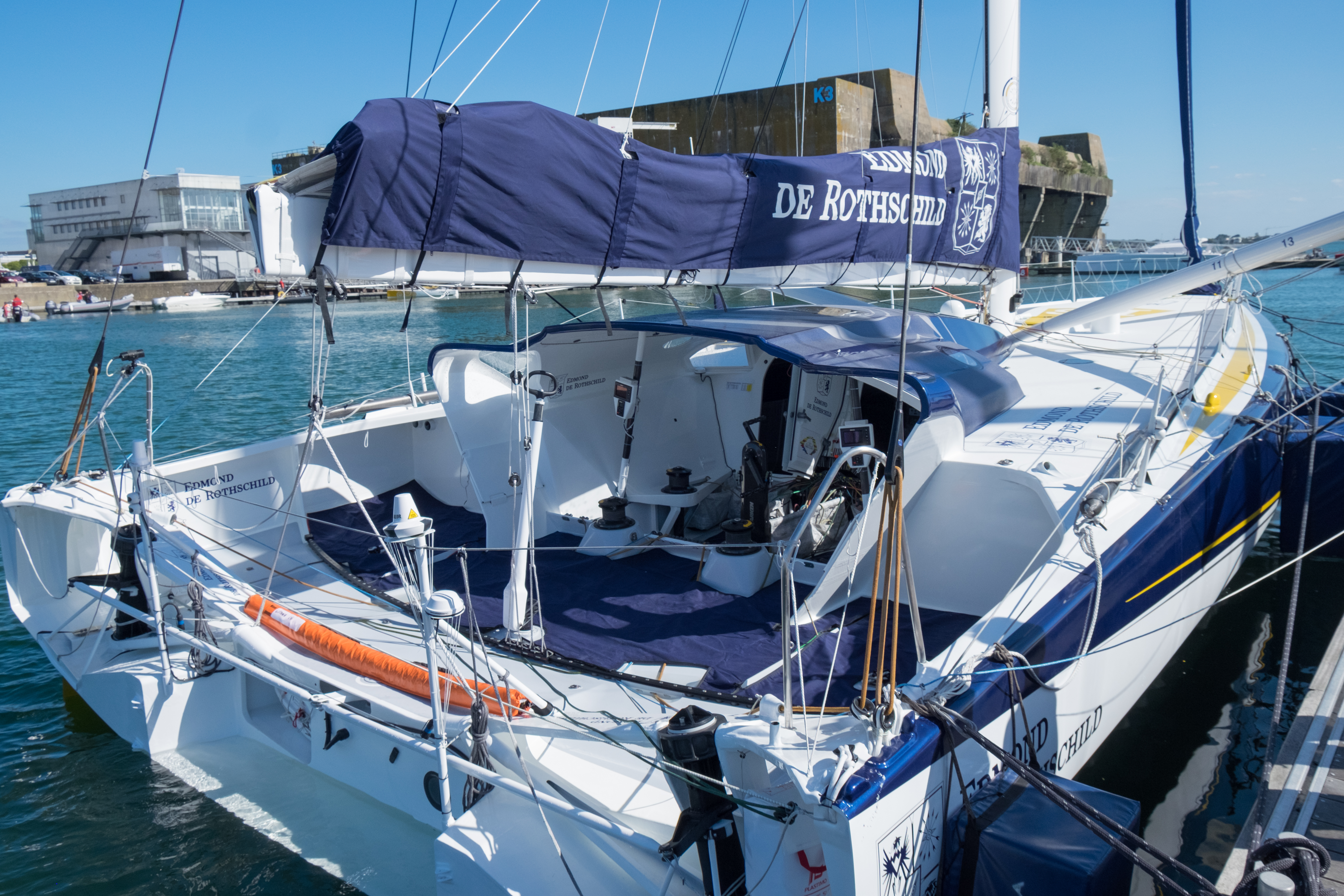

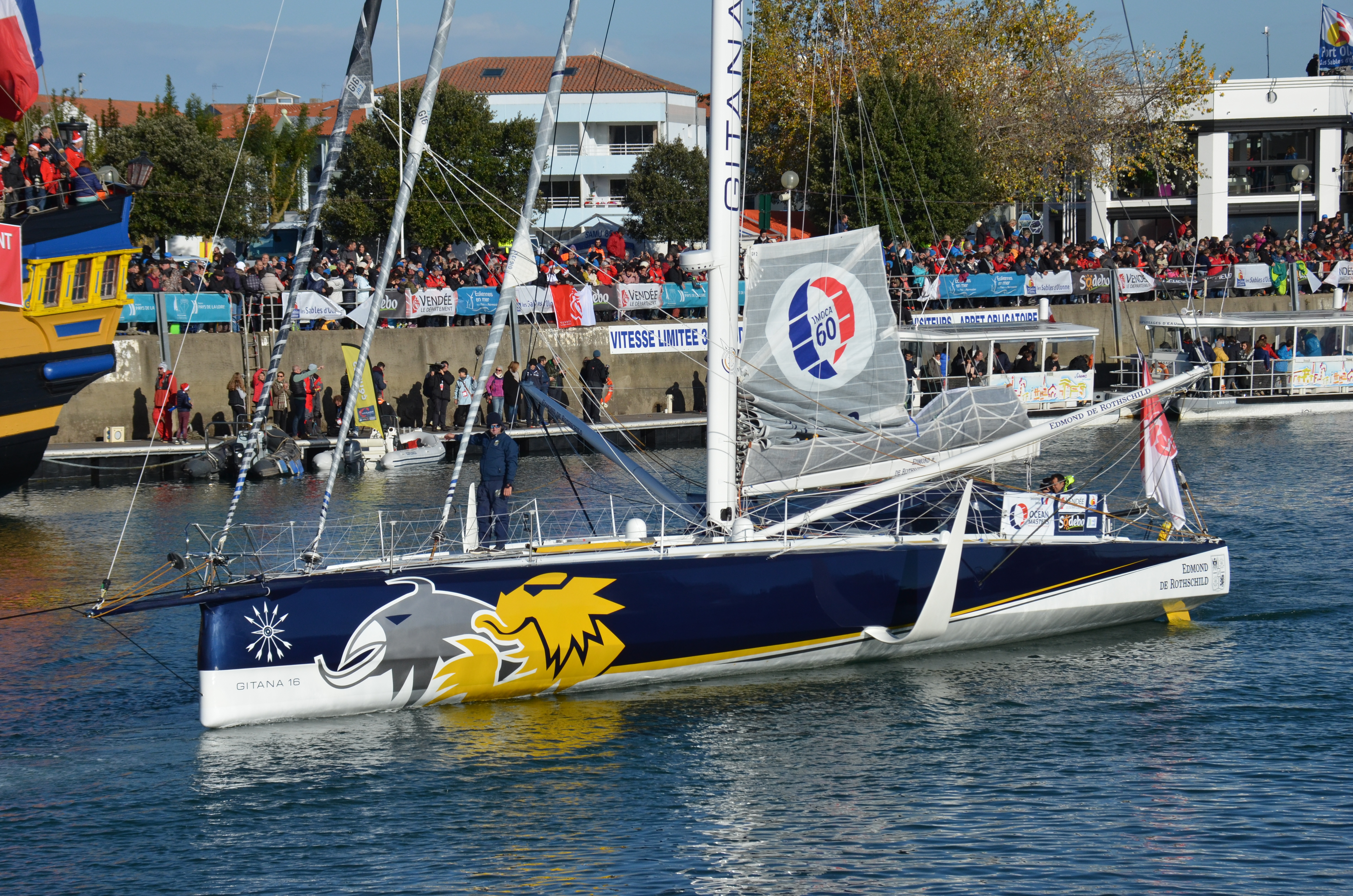

=== 2017–2021 - Malizia II, MON 10 ===
In 2016, Pierre Casiraghi, vice-president of the Yacht Club de Monaco, worked with his friend Boris Herrmann of Germany and others to create Team Malizia. The yacht was renamed and competed for the team under the name Malizia II, with the sail number MON 10, flagged by Seaexplorer-Yacht Club de Monaco for the 2020-2021 Vendée Globe.

=== 2021 to date: Fortinet-Best Western, FRA 10 ===
In March 2020, Romain Attanasio of France bought the yacht, following a repair and refit, with the intention of competing in the 2024-2025 Vendée Globe.

== Voyages ==
=== Racing history ===
Pos	Year	Race	Class	Boat name	Skipper	Notes	Ref
Round the world races
5/33	2020	2020–2021 Vendée Globe	IMOCA 60	Seaexplorer YCM	Boris Herrmann (GER)		
RET	2016	2016–2017 Vendée Globe	IMOCA 60	Gitana 16	Sébastien Josse (FRA)	foil shaft issue	
Transatlantic Races
7	2021	Transat Jacques Vabre	IMOCA 60	Fortinet - Best Western	Romain Attanasio (FRA); Seb Marsset (FRA)		
15	2019	Transat Jacques Vabre	IMOCA 60	Malizia II	Boris Herrmann (GER); Will Harris (GBR)		
4	2017	Transat Jacques Vabre	IMOCA 60	Edmond de Rothschild	Boris Herrmann (GER); Thomas Ruyant (FRA)		
RET	2015	Transat Jacques Vabre	IMOCA 60	Edmond de Rothschild	Sébastien Josse (FRA); Charles Caudrelier (FRA)		
RET	2016	The Transat	IMOCA 60		Sébastien Josse (FRA)		
10	2018	Route du Rhum	IMOCA 60		Boris Herrmann (GER)		
	2016	Transat Arctique New-York – Vendée	IMOCA 60				
Other Races
6 / 12	2021	Rolex Fastnet Race	IMOCA 60	Fortinet - Best Western	Romain Attanasio (FRA) +Crew		
8 / 20	2019	Rolex Fastnet Race	IMOCA 60		Boris Herrmann (GER) +Crew		
3 / 9	2017	Rolex Fastnet Race	IMOCA 60		Boris Herrmann (GER); Pierre Casiraghi (MON) +Crew		
	2020	Le Défi Azimut race	IMOCA 60		Boris Herrmann (GER)		
	2020	Vendee Arctique race	IMOCA 60		Boris Herrmann (GER)		
	2019	Bermudes 1000 race	IMOCA 60		Boris Herrmann (GER)		
	2018	Monaco Globe Series; Portimao to Bermudes	IMOCA 60		Boris Herrmann (GER)		
	2016	Défi Azimut					

=== 2020–2021 Vendée Globe ===
With skipper Boris Herrmann the boat competed in the 2020–2021 Vendée Globe finishing 5th after having to reduce its speed close to Les Sables due to a collision with a fishing vessel which caused extensive damage to the starboard foil and side. Herrmann helped with the rescue of Kevin Escoffier after his boat sank.

=== Greta Thunberg Transatlantic Voyage ===
In August 2019, the Malizia II took Swedish climate activist Greta Thunberg across the North Atlantic Ocean from Plymouth to New York City without producing any carbon dioxide during the voyage; however, France 24 reported that several crew flew to New York to sail the yacht back to Europe. The trip was led by Boris Herrmann. Thunberg's crossing of the Atlantic started on 14 August 2019 and she arrived on 28 August.

== See also ==
- 2019 UN Climate Action Summit
- Transatlantic Voyages of Greta Thunberg
