= Global Ocean Race =

Yachting race

The Global Ocean Race (GOR, previously known as Portimão Global Ocean Race) is a yachting race for Class40 yachts which was first held in 2008–09. The second edition took place in 2011–12 and the third edition was scheduled to start in September 2015.

The race was created for single- and doublehanded yachts (Category "Singlehand/Class 40" and “Doublehanded/Class 40") and small budgets. The two former professional yachtsmen Josh Hall and Brian Hancock were the initiators of the race. The GOR is the first Class-40-race leading through the Southern Ocean (Pacific) and around Cape Horn.

== History ==
=== 2008–09 race ===
Six yachts (two solo, four double-handed) started the first edition of the race on 12 October 12, 2008 in Portimão, Portugal. The finish was in June 2009. The race was divided into five legs: The first one leg was from Portimão to Cape Town, the second to Wellington, New Zealand. Leg three ended in Ilhabela, Brazil. The race continued to Charleston, South Carolina, USA and from there back to Portimão. In all, the race covered a distance of about 30,000 nm.

==== Overall standings ====
Single-handed

Rank	Yacht	Sailor
1	Roaring Forty	(Belgium) Michel Kleinjans
Did not finish
	Hayai	(Netherlands) Nico Budel

Double-handed

Rank	Yacht	Sailors
1	Beluga Racer	(Germany) Boris Herrmann (Germany) Felix Oehme
2	Desafio Cabo de Hornos	(Chile) Felipe Cubillos (Chile) José Muñoz
3	Mowgli	(United Kingdom) Jeremy Salvesen (United Kingdom) David Thomson
Did not finish
	Kazimir Partners	(South Africa) Lenjohn van der Wel (South Africa) Peter van der Wel

=== 2011–12 race ===
The second edition of the Global Ocean Race featured six double-handed Class40 yachts. It started in September 2011 from Palma, Majorca, Spain and ended in June 2012 in Les Sables-d'Olonne, France. The race was made up of 5 legs with stops in Cape Town, South Africa, Wellington, New Zealand, Punta del Este, Uruguay and Charleston, United States.

==== Overall standings ====
Rank	Yacht	Sailors
1	Cessna Citation	(New Zealand) Conrad Colman (all legs) (Spain) Hugo Ramon (leg 1) (United Kingdom) Sam Goodchild (leg 2) (South Africa) Adrian Kuttel (leg 3) (Australia) Scott Cavanough (legs 4 and 5)
2	Financial Crisis	(Italy) Marco Nannini (all legs) (United Kingdom) Paul Peggs (leg 1) (Spain) Hugo Ramon (legs 2 and 3) (Italy) Sergio Frattaruolo (legs 4 and 5)
3	Phesheya-Racing	(South Africa) Phillippa Hutton-Squire (all legs) (South Africa) Nick Leggatt (all legs)
4	Sec. Hayai	(Netherlands) Nico Budel (all legs) (Netherlands) Ruud van Rijsewijk (leg 1) (Netherlands) Frans Budel (legs 2 and 5) (Netherlands) Erik van Vuuren (leg 4) (Netherlands) Yvonne Beusker (50% of leg 4) (did not compete on leg 3)
Did not finish
	Buckley Systems	(New Zealand) Ross Field (legs 1–3) (New Zealand) Campbell Field (legs 1–3)
	Campagne de France	(France) Halvard Mabire (legs 1–3) (United Kingdom) Miranda Merron (legs 1–3)

=== 2015–16 race (Cancelled) ===
The third edition of the race has been announced to start in September 2015 and would again feature single- and double-handed categories. The race would start in Southampton, England and end in Portsmouth. There would be only one stop, in Auckland, New Zealand.

== See also ==
- Vendée Globe
- Barcelona World Race
- Volvo Ocean Race
- Ocean Globe Race
