= Isabelle Joschke =

French skipper

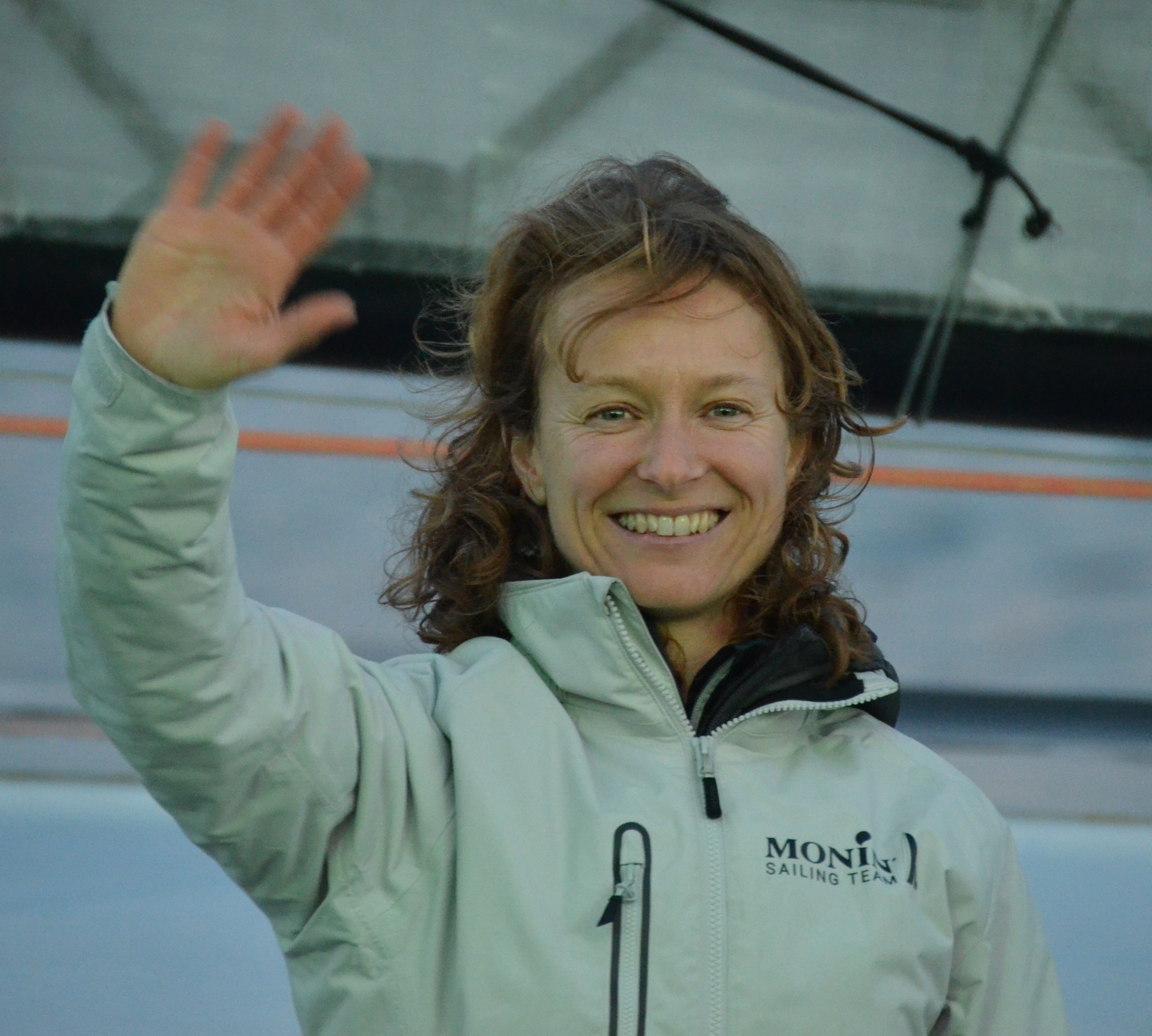
- Start of 2018 Route du Rhum

Personal information
- Nickname: Munich
- Nationality: German; French
- Born: 27 January 1977 (age 49) Munich, Germany

Sailing career
- Sport: Sailing
- Class: IMOCA 60

Isabelle Joschke is an offshore sailor of dual German and French nationality. She was born on 27 January 1977 in Munich, Germany.

== Personal life ==
She has a German father and a French mother and therefore has dual nationality. Her childhood was spent in both Geneva and Paris. She discovered sailing at the age of five, sailing an Optimist on a family holiday on the lakes of Austria. Fifteen years later, she did an internship in the Glénans, which definitely communicated her taste for the wide.

She has a master's degree in classical literature at the Sorbonne.

== Sailing career ==
=== 2008–2015 Bénéteau Figaro ===
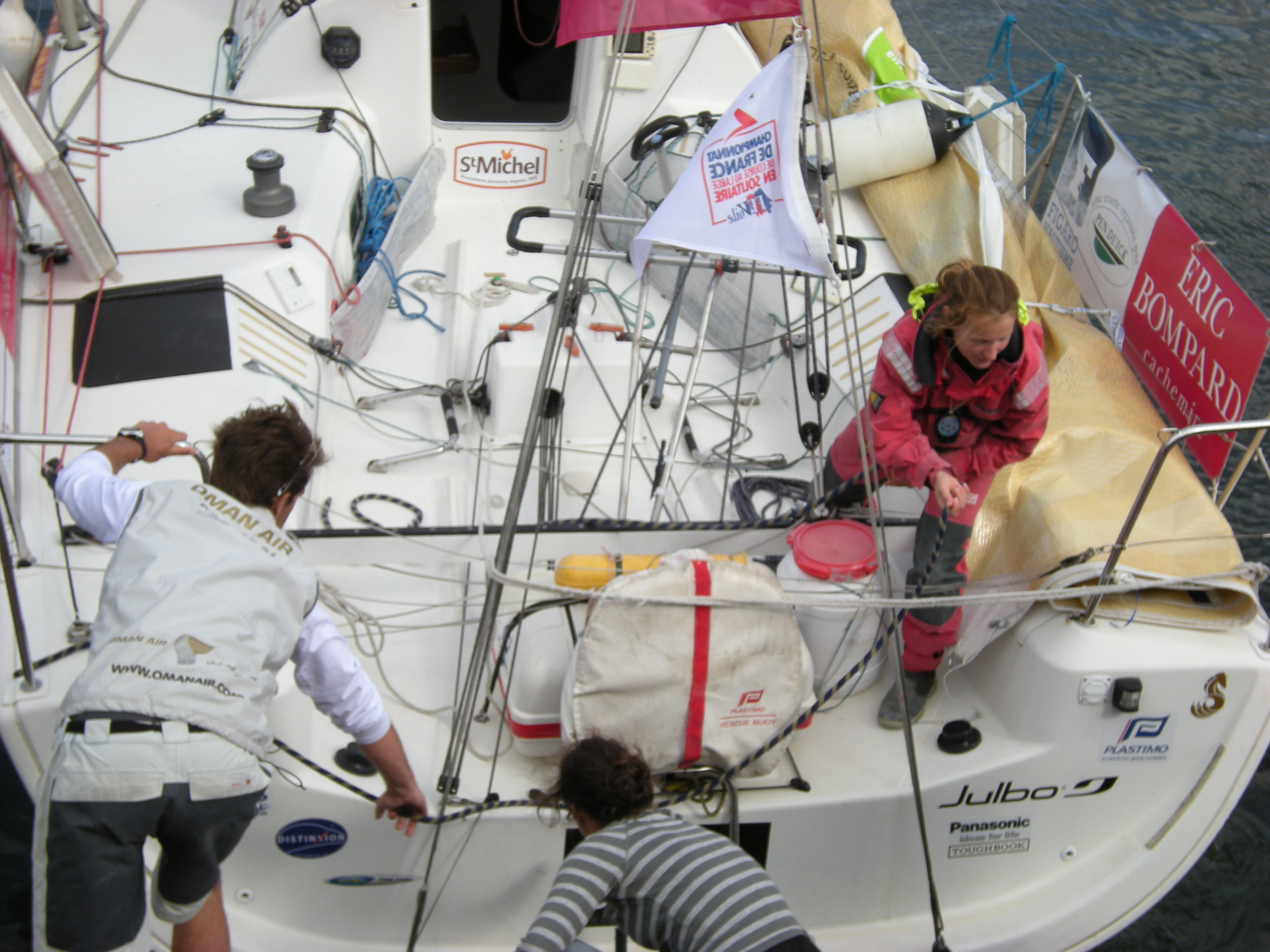

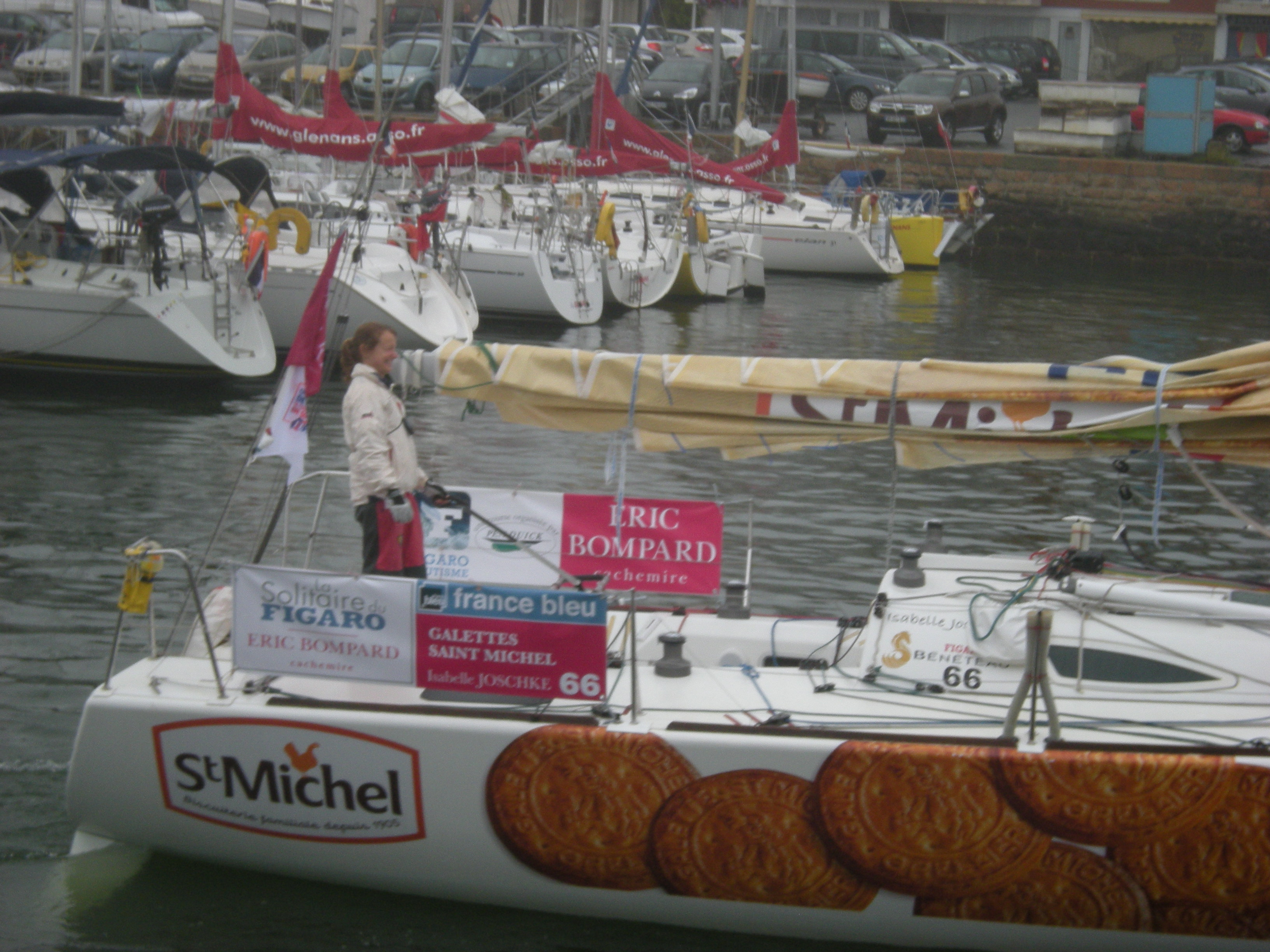

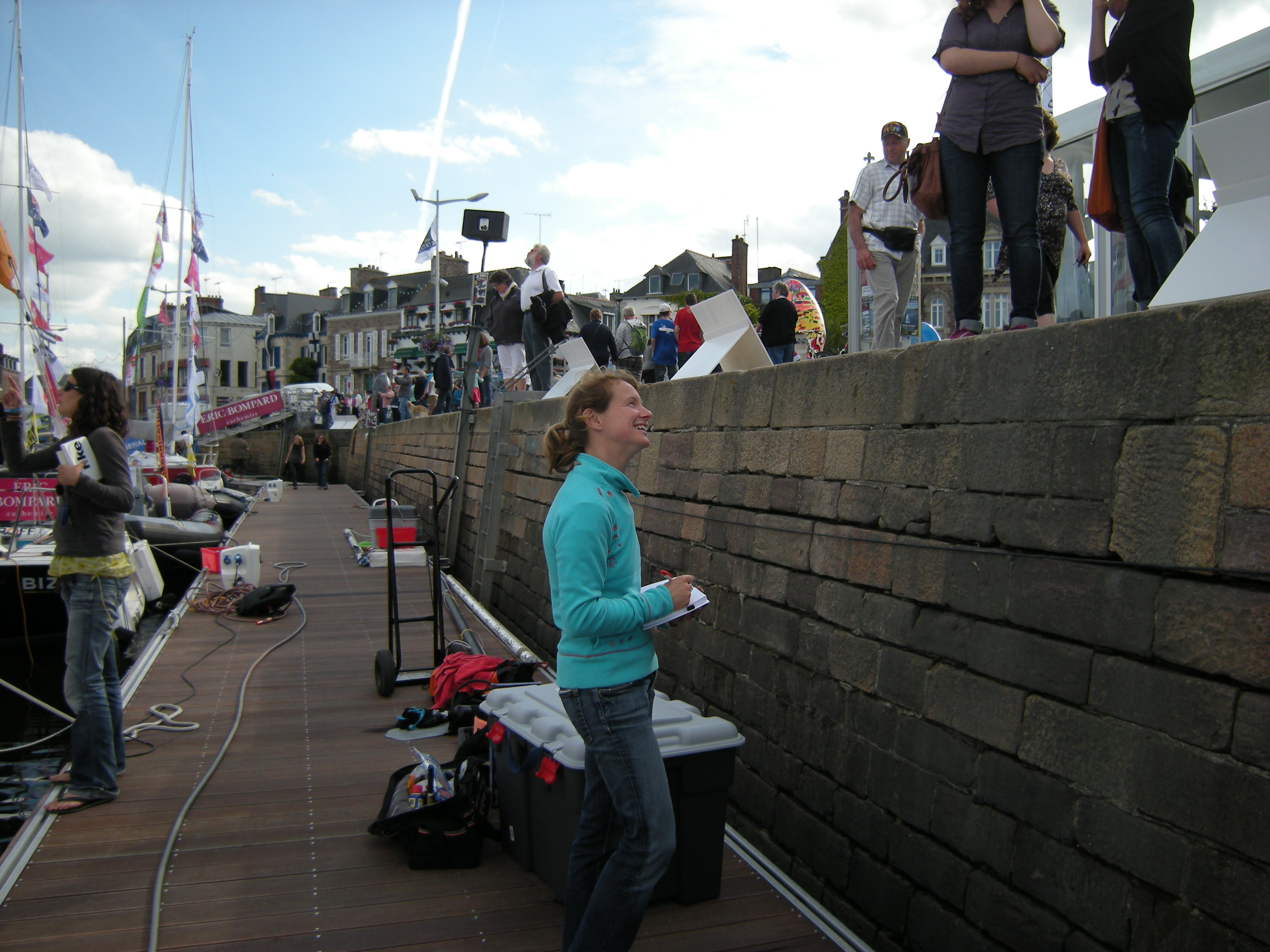

=== 2017–present IMOCA 60 ===
She competed in the 2020–2021 Vendée Globe IMOCA 60 onboard MACSF. She had to retire from the race while approaching Cape Horn due to keel RAM failure.
