= Vincent Riou =

French sailor (born 1972)

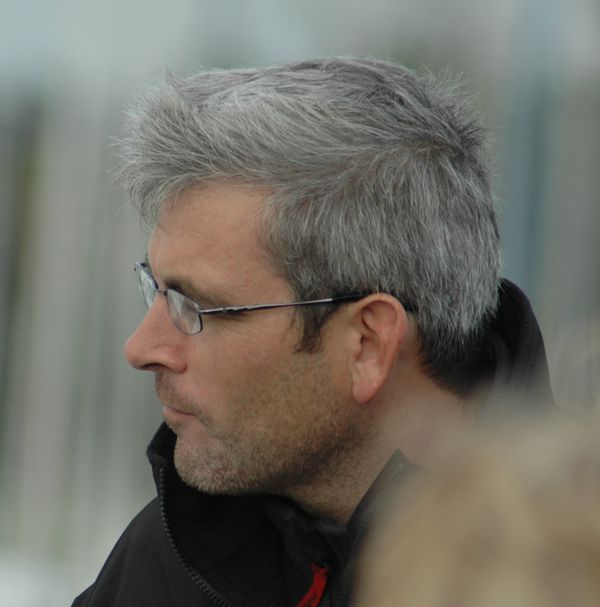
- Born: 9 January 1972 (age 54); Pont-l'Abbé, France
- Occupation: Sailor
- Known for: Winning the Vendée Globe

Vincent Riou (born 9 January 1972, Pont-l'Abbé, France) is a French sailor. He is the skipper of PRB, a 60-foot monohull. He won the 2004 edition of the Vendée Globe.

== Recent events ==
As part of his introduction to solo racing he helped, prepare Michel Desjoyeaux’s 60-foot PRB for the 2000 edition of the Vendée Globe.

In the 2008 Vendée Globe, he lost his mast the day after a collision that occurred during the rescue of Jean Le Cam, whose boat had capsized.

In the 2016 Vendée Globe, he sailed at a decent speed, competing with front boats fitted with hydrofoils, but after 15 days 11 hours 58 minutes of racing and completing 27% of the whole race, he was forced to retire after another collision with a UFO. The almost exact same incident had happened to Vincent in the 2012–2013 Vendée Globe, making him among the most unfortunate sailors of the Vendée Globe.

== Honours ==
- 2nd 1992 Challenge Credit Agricole
- 1st 2003 Calais Round Britain Race
- 1st 2004 Vendée Globe
- 1st 2007 Calais Round Britain Race
- 1st 2007 Rolex RORC Fastnet Race
- 3rd 2008 Vendée Globe
- DNF 2012 Vendée Globe
- DNF 2016 Vendée Globe
