= Kevin Escoffier =

French sailor

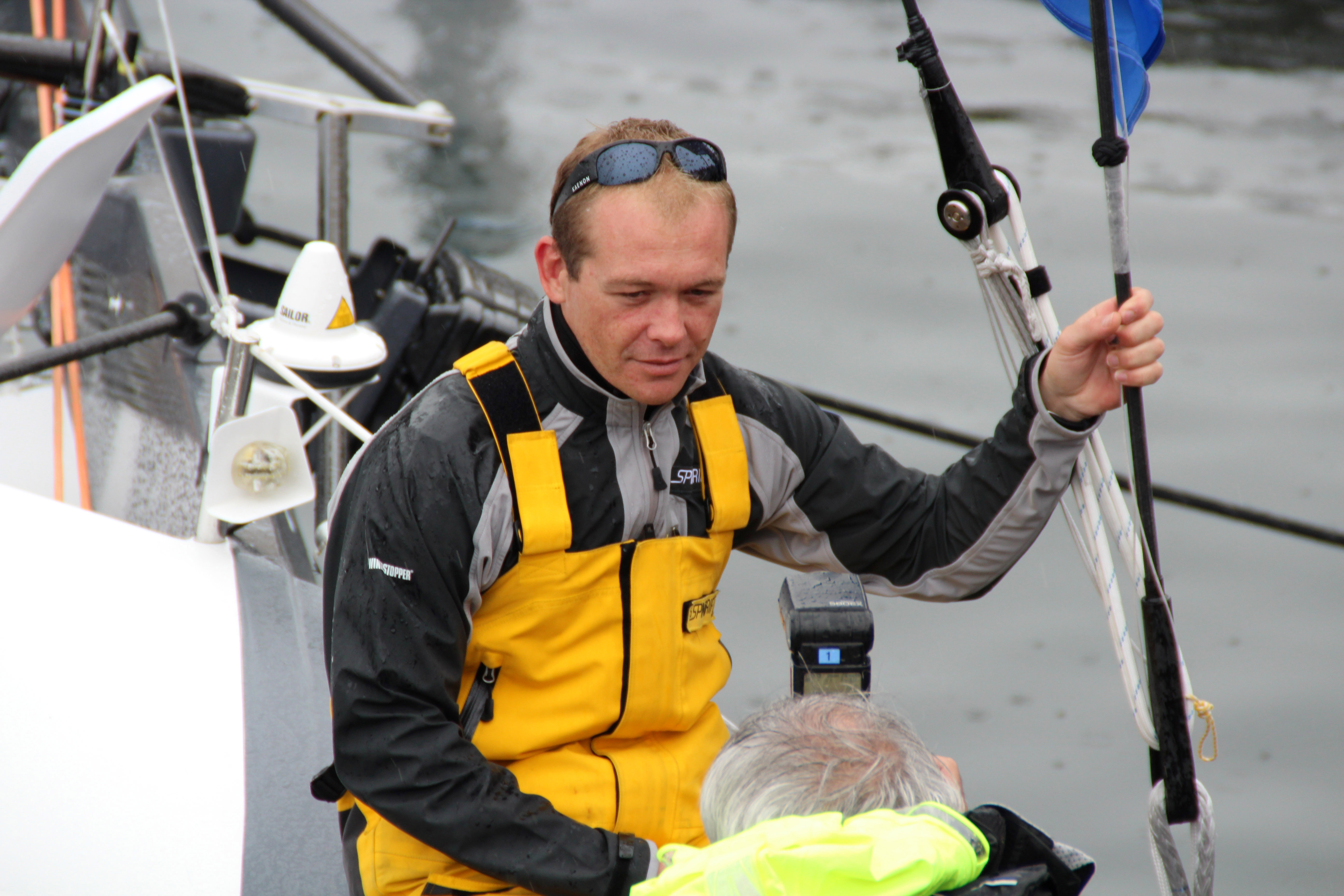
- 2012 Jules Verne attempt

Personal information
- Nationality: French
- Born: 4 April 1980 (age 46) Saint-Malo

Sport

Sailing career
- Class: IMOCA 60
- Club: SN Baie St. Malo

Kevin Escoffier is a French professional sailor born on 4 April 1980 in Saint-Malo, France and a resident of Lorient. He is an offshore sailor who has won the 2018 Volvo Ocean Race as a bowman onboard DongFeng and competed in the 2020–2021 Vendée Globe aboard PRB. In 2022-23, he initially skippered Holcim-PRB in The Ocean Race, before leaving the team amid a sexual misconduct probe. He is a member of the yacht club SN Baie St. Malo.

== Biography ==
He studied Engineering for 3 years at EPF in Paris, 2 years at the École Polytechnique de Montréal and 8 months at the University of Maryland and now specializes in composite engineering. One of his first projects was being involved in the development of Multi 50 class "Crêpes Whaou! 2", which was built for his father Franck-Yves Escoffier, also an offshore sailor. This boat was launched in April 2005 and in November of that year Escoffier and his father won class in the Transat Jacques Vabre. We was involved in various IMOCA projects for other skippers, and has headed up Team Banque Populaire's design office.

== 2020–2021 Vendée Globe Rescue ==
While competing in the 2020–2021 Vendée Globe his IMOCA 60 PRB hull broke in half, sinking quickly in the Southern Ocean. Describing the speed of the incident he said “I didn't have time to do anything, I just had time to send a message to my team. I'm sinking, I'm not joking. MAYDAY.” He later recalled how the boat folded in half.

The race director sent fellow competitor Jean Le Cam to the area who found Escoffier in his life raft, but lost contact while preparing to recover him. More competitors were sent to help with the search but Jean Le Cam found Escoffier for the second time several hours later and took him on board.

The rescue got extensive coverage with French President Emmanuel Macron getting in contact with Escoffier and Jean Le Cam. Escoffier later described the way the boat folded in 90 degrees and the very limited time he had to abandon ship, and how him carrying a personal AIS beacon helped save his life.

== Results ==
Pos.	Year	Event	Class	Boat name	Notes	Ref.
Round the World Race
DNF	2021	2020–2021 Vendée Globe	IMOCA 60	PRB	Sank, rescued by Jean Le Cam	
1	2018	2017-2018 Volvo Ocean Race	Volvo Ocean 65	Dongfeng Race Team		
3	2014	2014-2015 Volvo Ocean Race	Volvo Ocean 65	Dongfeng Race Team		
WR	2012	Jules Verne Trophy	Maxi Multi	Banque Populaire V	New Round the World Record of 45d 13h 42m 53s	
Trans Oceanic Race
2	2019	Transat Jacques Vabre	IMOCA 60	PRB	with Nicolas Lunven	
1	2015	Krys Ocean Race	MOD 70	Spindrift	Transatlantic in 4d 21h 8m at 28 knots	
WR	2009	Transatlantic sailing record	-	Banque Populaire V	Crew in a time of 3d 15h 25min 48s	
1	2005	Transat Jacques Vabre	Multi 50	Crêpes Whaou! 2	with Franck-Yves Escoffier	
Other Races
5	2020	Vendée-Arctique-Les Sables d'Olonne	IMOCA 60	PRB	Singlehanded Vendee Qualifier	
5	2020	Défi Azimut	IMOCA 60	PRB		with
2	2019	Défi Azimut			with Nicolas Lunven	
2	2019	Rolex Fastnet Race	IMOCA 60	PRB		
