= Vendée Arctique =

Solo Oceanic Yacht Race

Coordinates: 46.4951°N 1.7886°W

- First held: 2020
- Classes: IMOCA 60
- Start: Les Sables-d'Olonne
- Finish: Les Sables-d'Olonne
- Length: 3000 Nm
- Website: www.vendeearctique.org

The Vendée Arctique is a single-handed (solo) yacht race, from France to the Arctic Circle and back.

== The race ==
=== History ===
The race was founded by in 2020, as a qualifier for the Vendée Globe following the cancellation of a number of the qualifying races due to COVID-19. It is named after the Département of Vendée, in France, where the race starts and ends. The race starts and finishes in Les Sables-d'Olonne, in the Département of Vendée, in France.

The concept of a series of events heading up to the northern high latitudes with the intention of this race become a permanent fixture.

The race is open to monohull yachts conforming to the Open 60 class criteria.

== Race Editions ==
=== 1st Edition: 2020 ===
Classified Results for the 2020 Edition
Pos.	Skipper	Boat name	Elapsed Time	Ref.
1	Jérémie Beyou (FRA)	Charal	10d 05h 14m 08s	
2	Charlie Dalin (FRA)	Apivia	10d 06h 04m 12s	
3	Thomas Ruyant (FRA)	Linkedout	10d 06h 24m 12s	
4	Samantha Davies (GBR)	Initiatives-Coeur (3)	10d 06h 58m 55s	
5	Kevin Escoffier (FRA)	PRB	10d 07h 54m 34s	
6	Yannick Bestaven (FRA)	Maitre Coq IV	10d 09h 20m 30s	
7	Boris Herrmann (GER)	Seaexplorer - Yacht Club De Monaco	10d 09h 42m 54s	
8	Giancarlo Pedote (ITA)	Prysmian Group	10d 10h 27m 50s	
9	Fabrice Amedeo (FRA)	Newrest - Art & Fenêtres	10d 11h 28m 32s	
10	Kojiro Shiraishi (JPN)	Dmg Mori Global One	10d 11h 30m 29s	
11	Maxime Sorel (FRA)	V And B - Mayenne	10d 11h 33m 10s	
12	Clarisse Crémer (FRA)	Banque Populaire X	10d 12h 24m 24s	
13	Isabelle Joschke (FRA)	MACSF	10d 23h 49m 34s	
14	Arnaud Boissières (FRA)	La Mie Câline - Artisans Artipôle	11d 12h 05m 31s	
15	Manuel Cousin (FRA)	Groupe Sétin	11d 13h 30m 29s	
16	Clément Giraud (FRA)	Vers Un Monde Sans Sida	11d 16h 33m 27s	
17	Miranda Merron (GBR)	Campagne De France	11d 21h 38m 47s	
RET	Damien Seguin (FRA)	Groupe Apicil	Abandon	
RET	Armel Tripon (FRA)	L'Occitane En Provence	Abandon	
RET	Sébastien Simon (FRA)	Arkéa Paprec	Abandon	

=== 2nd Edition: 2022 ===
The course was significantly shortened due to heavy weather.

Classified Results for the 2022 Edition
Pos.	Skipper	Boat name	Elapsed Time	Ref.
1	Charlie Dalin (FRA)	Apivia	4d 09h 20m 26s	
2	Jérémie Beyou (FRA)	Charal	4d 13h 04m 08s	
3	Thomas Ruyant (FRA)	Linkedout	4d 16h 33m 46s	
4	Benjamin Ferré (FRA)	Monnoyeur - Duo For A Job	5d 07h 08m 42s	
5	Louis Burton (FRA)	Bureau Vallée 2	5d 08h 50m 22s	
6	Guirec Soudée (FRA)	Freelance.Com	5d 09h 07m 42s	
7	Alan Roura (SUI)	Hublot	5d 09h 47m 11s	
8	Louis Duc (FRA)	Fives – Lantana Environnement	5d 09h 54m 12s	
9	Damien Seguin (FRA)	Groupe Apicil	5d 10h 10m 37s	
10	Nicolas Lunven (FRA)	Banque Populaire	5d 10h 42m 55s	
11	Benjamin Dutreux (FRA)	Guyot Environnement - Water Family	5d 11h 24m 30s	
12	Giancarlo Pedote (ITA)	Prysmian Group	5d 12h 17m 36s	
13	Pip Hare (GBR)	Medallia	5d 15h 25m 27s	
14	Éric Bellion (FRA)	Comme Un Seul Homme Powered By Altavia	5d 16h 04m 10s	
15	Sébastien Marsset (FRA)	Cap Agir Ensemble #Sponsorsbienvenus	5d 17h 01m 34s	
16	Antoine Cornic (FRA)	Ebac Literie	5d 17h 46m 08s	
17	Romain Attanasio (FRA)	Fortinet - Best Western	5d 19h 40m 25s	
18	Conrad Colman (NZL)	Imagine	6d 00h 33m 40s	
19	Fabrice Amedeo (FRA)	Nexans - Art & Fenêtres	6d 04h 12m 43s	
20	Kojiro Shiraishi (JPN)	Dmg Mori Global One	6d 05h 33m 55s	
DNF	Denis Van Weynbergh (BEL)	Laboratoires De Biarritz		
DNF	Isabelle Joschke (FRA)	Macsf		
DNF	Arnaud Boissières (FRA)	La Mie Câline - Artisans Artipôle		
DNF	Manuel Cousin (FRA)	Groupe Sétin		
DNF	Szabolcs Weores (HUN)	Szabi Racing		

=== 3rd Edition: 2026 ===
Classified Results for the 2026 Edition
Pos.	Skipper	Boat name	Elapsed Time	Ref.
1	Ambrogio Beccaria (ITA)	Allagrande Mapei	8d 14h 05m 50s	
2	Sam Goodchild (GBR)	MACIF Santé Prévoyance	8d 15h 20m 53s	
3	Violette Dorange (FRA)	Initiatives-Cœur 4	8d 16h 21m 53s	
4	Élodie Bonafous (FRA)	Association Petits Princes - Quéguiner	8d 19h 07m 59s	
5	Francesca Clapcich (ITA)	11th Hour Racing	8d 20h 31m 11s	+30m penalty
6	Nico D'Estais (FRA)	Café Joyeux	10d 07h 15m 22s	
7	Arnaud Boissières (FRA)	April Marine - recherche co-partenaires	10d 13h 12m 36s	
8	Manuel Cousin (FRA)	Coup De Pouce	13d 21h 08m 40s	
DNF	Corentin Horeau (FRA)	MACSF		

== See also ==
IMOCA races

- Vendee Globe, a non-stop single person race around the World, currently run using the IMOCA 60 Class.
- The Barcelona World Race, a non-stop two person race around the World, currently run using the IMOCA 60 Class.
- Route du Rhum
- Transat Jacque Vabre
