= Transat New York Vendée =

Boating race from New York to France

New York Vendée – Les Sables d'Olonne
- First held: 2016
- Organizer: SAEM Vendée
- Start: New York City
- Finish: Les Sables-d'Olonne
- Length: 3,100
- Website: newyorkvendee.org

The Transat New York Vendée - Les Sables d'Olonne is a solo transatlantic race aboard IMOCA 60 monohulls. It is part of the IMOCA Globe Series circuit. The 3,100 nautical miles route starts in New York City and finishes in Les Sables-d'Olonne, Vendée Region, France.

This transatlantic, organised by SAEM Vendée, the organising company of the Vendée Globe. It is the last qualifying race for the solo tour around the world, without stopover and without assistance.

Its first edition in 2016 saw the victory of Frenchman Jérémie Beyou aboard Maître Coq. A second edition took place in May 2024.

== History ==
The race was created in 2015. One of the objectives is the internationalization of this type of race and to offer a final major test before the start of the Vendée Globe.

There was a race scheduled for 2020 that was cancelled due to the COVID-19 pandemic.

In the 2016 race onboard reporters were allowed, as long as they did not participate in the race. Due to some disagreements, eventually, only Fabrice Amédéo (Newrest-Matmut), Tanguy de Lamotte (Initiatives-Coeur) and Conrad Colman (100% Natural Energy) left with a journalist on board.

== 2016 Edition ==
The first edition of the transat brings together fourteen skippers, of which it is the last major confrontation before the start of the 2016–2017 Vendée Globe. A fifteenth competitor, Finn Ari Huusela, could not make the start following the damage of Finnair on 13 May 2016 by Richard Tolkien, who was on board for The Transat.

The IMOCAs departed New York City on Sunday, May 29, 2016. The start of the U.S. coast race saw a number of competitors hit unknown floating objects. Five of them rerouted to Newport to repair: Yann Eliès (Quéguiner – Leukemia espoir), Armel Le Cléac'h (Banque populaire VIII), Morgan Lagravière (Safran), Jean-Pierre Dick (StMichel-Virbac) and Pieter Heerema (No Way Back). Tanguy de Lamotte on Initiatives-Coeur chose to continue despite the damage to the Sables-d'Olonne. There is a lot of debris on this busy coast.

Jérémie Beyou (Maître Coq) won his first major victory in the IMOCA, ahead of Sébastien Josse (Edmond de Rothschild) and Alex Thomson (Hugo Boss). The three boats were all equipped with foils.

Classification
Pos.	Competitor	Baot	Designer	Builder	Year	Time
1	Jérémie Beyou (FRA)	Maître Coq	Verdier / VPLP	CDK Technologies	2010	9d 16h 57m 49s
2	Sébastien Josse (FRA)	Gitana – Edmond de Rothschild	Verdier / VPLP	Multiplast	2015	9d 19h 26m 49s
3	Alex Thomson (GBR)	Hugo Boss 6	Verdier / VPLP	Green Marine	2015	9d 21h 3m 33s
4	Paul Meilhat (FRA)	SMA	Verdier / VPLP	CDK Technologies	2010	10d 12h 19m 27s
5	Vincent Riou (FRA)	PRB 4	Verdier / VPLP	CDK Technologies	2010	11d 10h 58m 53s
6	Tanguy de Lamotte (FRA)	Initiatives-Cœur (2)	Farr Yacht Design	CDK Technologies	2006	11d 15h 38m 39s
7	Kojiro Shiraishi (JAP)	Spirit of Yukoh IV	Bruce Farr Yacht Design	Offshore Challenges Sailing Team	2007	12d 1h 21m 40s
8	Fabrice Amedeo (FRA)	Newrest-Matmut	Farr Yacht Design	Southern Ocean Marine	2007	12d 6h 20m 15s
9	Morgan Lagravière (FRA)	Safran III	Verdier / VPLP	CDK Technologies	2015	13d 5h 59m 45s
10	Jean-Pierre Dick (FRA)	StMichel-Virbac	Verdier / VPLP	Multiplast	2015	13d 6h 21m 24s
11	Yann Elies (FRA)	Quéguiner – Leucémie Espoir	Verdier / VPLP	Eyer	2007	13d 6h 56m 36s
12	Conrad Colman (NZL)	100% Natural Energy	Artech Design Team	Artech do Brasil	2005	14d 6h 55m 57s
DNF	Armel Le Cléac'h (FRA)	Banque populaire VIII	Verdier / VPLP	CDK Technologies	2015	DNF (collision)
DNF	Pieter Heerema (NED)	No Way Back	Verdier / VPLP	Persian Marine	2015	DNF (collision)

== 2024 Edition ==
A second edition took place in June 2024.

Classification
Pos.	Skipper	Boat			Time	Ref.
Pos.	Skipper	Sail No.	Boat name	Year	Time	Ref.
1	Charlie Dalin (FRA)	FRA 79	MACIF Santé Prévoyance	2023	10d 03h 44m 30s	
2	Boris Herrmann (GER)	MON 1297	Malizia – Seaexplorer	2022	10d 20h 52m 32s	
3	Jérémie Beyou (FRA)	FRA 3	Charal (2)	2022	12d 01h 11min 49s	
4	Sébastien Simon (FRA)	FRA 112	Groupe Dubreuil	2021	12d 03h 02min 01s	
5	Thomas Ruyant (FRA)	FRA 59	Vulnerable – For People	2023	12d 03h 57min 10s	
6	Sam Davies (GBR)	FRA 109	Initiative Coeur 4	2022	12d 10h 48min 29s	
7	Yoann Richomme (FRA)	FRA 24	Paprec Arkéa	2023	12d 11h 11min 19s	
8	Justine Mettraux (SUI)	FRA 8	Teamwork.net	2018	12d 16h 56min 55s	
9	Pip Hare (GBR)	GBR 77	Medallia	2015	12d 23h 44min 22s	
10	Louis Burton (FRA)	FRA 02	Bureau Vallée (2)	2020	13d 04h 46min 31s	
11	Nicolas Lunven (FRA)	FRA 85	Holcim – PRB	2022	13d 18h 20min 44s	
12	Maxime Sorel (FRA)	FRA 53	V and B – Monbana – Mayenne	2022	13d 20h 05min 08s	
13	Benjamin Dutreux (FRA)	FRA 09	Guyot Environment – Water Family	2015	14d 11h 59m 23S	
14	Romain Attanasio (FRA)	FRA 10	Fortinet – Best Western (2)	2015	14d 18h 36m 23S	
15	Kojiro Shiraishi (JPN)	JPN 11	DMG Mori Global One	2019	14d 18h 38m 48S	
16	Clarisse Cremer (FRA)	FRA 15	L’Occitane en Provence (2)	2019	14d 19h 00m 40S	
17	Eric Bellion (FRA)	FRA 5	Stand As One	2023	14d 19h 50m 58S	
18	Violette Dorange (FRA)	FRA 01	Devenir	2007	14d 20h 10m 50S	
19	James Harayda (GBR)		Gentoo Sailing Team	2007	14d 21h 47min 27s	
20	Yannick Bestaven (FRA)	FRA 17	Maitre Coq V	2022	14d 22h 08min 02s	
21	Conrad Colman (USA) (NZL)	NZL 64	Ms. Amlin	2007	14d 22h 47min 03s	
22	Scott Shawyer (CAN)	CAN 80	Be Water Positive	2011	14d 23h 20min 03s	
23	Manuel Cousin (FRA)	FRA 71	Coup de Pouce – Giffard Manutention	2007	14d 23h 31min 55s	
24	Oliver Heer (SUI)	SUI 49	Olicer Heer Ocean Racing	2007	15d 00h 01min 02s	
25	Denis Van Weynbergh (BEL)	BEL 207	D'Ieteren Group	2014	15d 01h 13min 04s	
26	Szabolcs Weöres (HUN)	HUN 23	New Europe	2007	15d 01h 42min 02s	
27	Jingkun Xu (CHN)	CHN 5	Singchain Team Haikou	2007	15d 02h 20min 55s	
DNF	Sam Goodchild (GBR)	FRA 100	Vulnerable – For the Planet	2019		

== See also ==
- IMOCA 60
- Vendée Globe
