= 2023 Transat Jacques Vabre =

2023 2023 Transat Jacque Vabre
Event title
- Edition: 16th
- Host: Association Transat Jacques Vabre
- Yachts: Ultime; Multi 50; IMOCA 60; Class 40

The 2023 edition of the Transat Jacques Vabre was the 16th edition of the yachting race and was raced from Le Havre, France, to Fort de France, Martinique.

Class	Course Distance	Revised Distance	Boats Starting
Ultime	7500	7500	5
Multi 50	5800	4200 (1)	6
IMOCA 60	5400	3750	40
Class 40	4600	4045 (1)	44

(1) Made up of two Leg Race with a stop in Lorient

== Course changes ==
Due to a storm the IMOCAs started 9 days later than scheduled and the Class 40s and Multi 50's made an intermediate stop in Lorient.

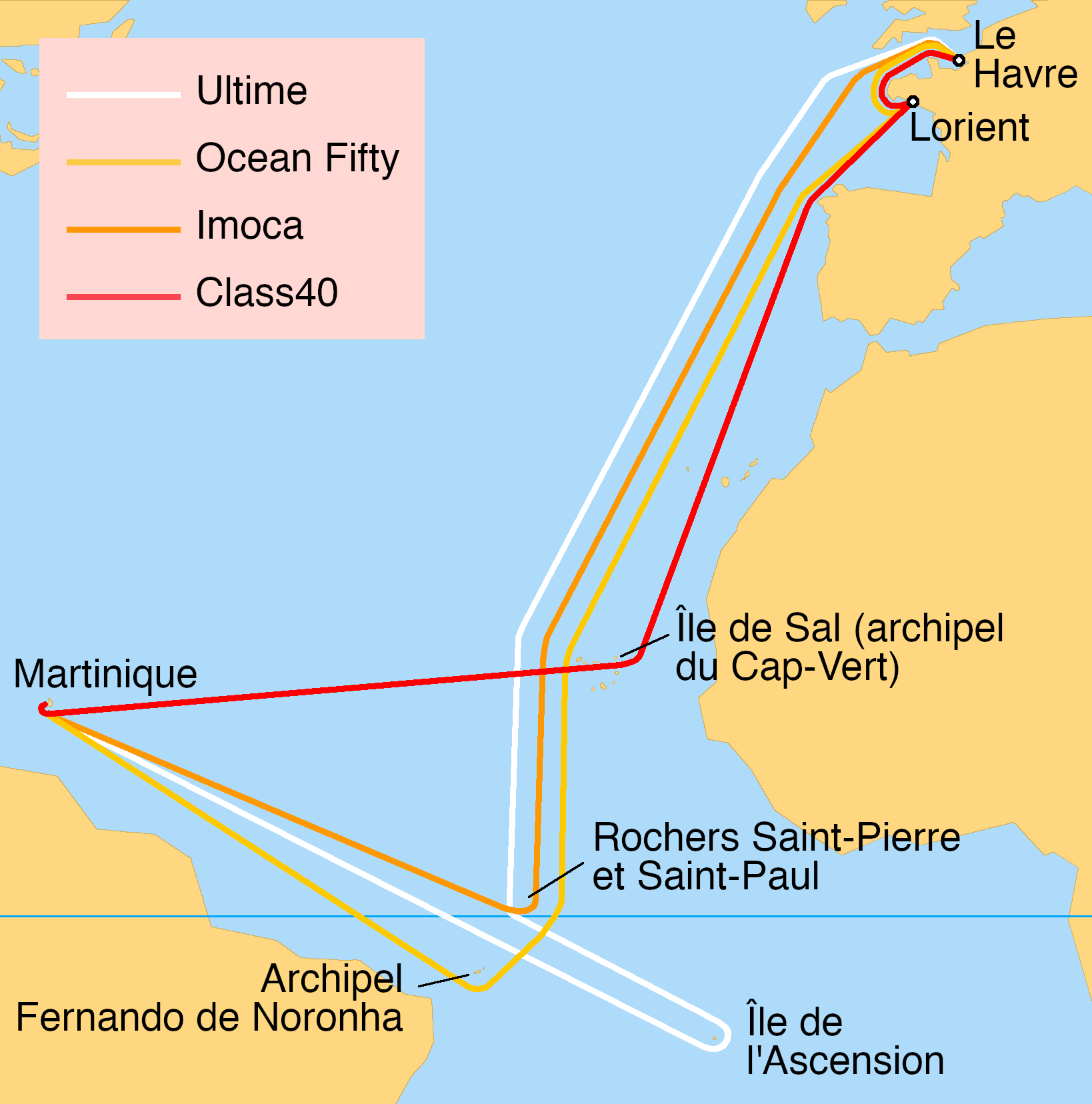
Proposed course

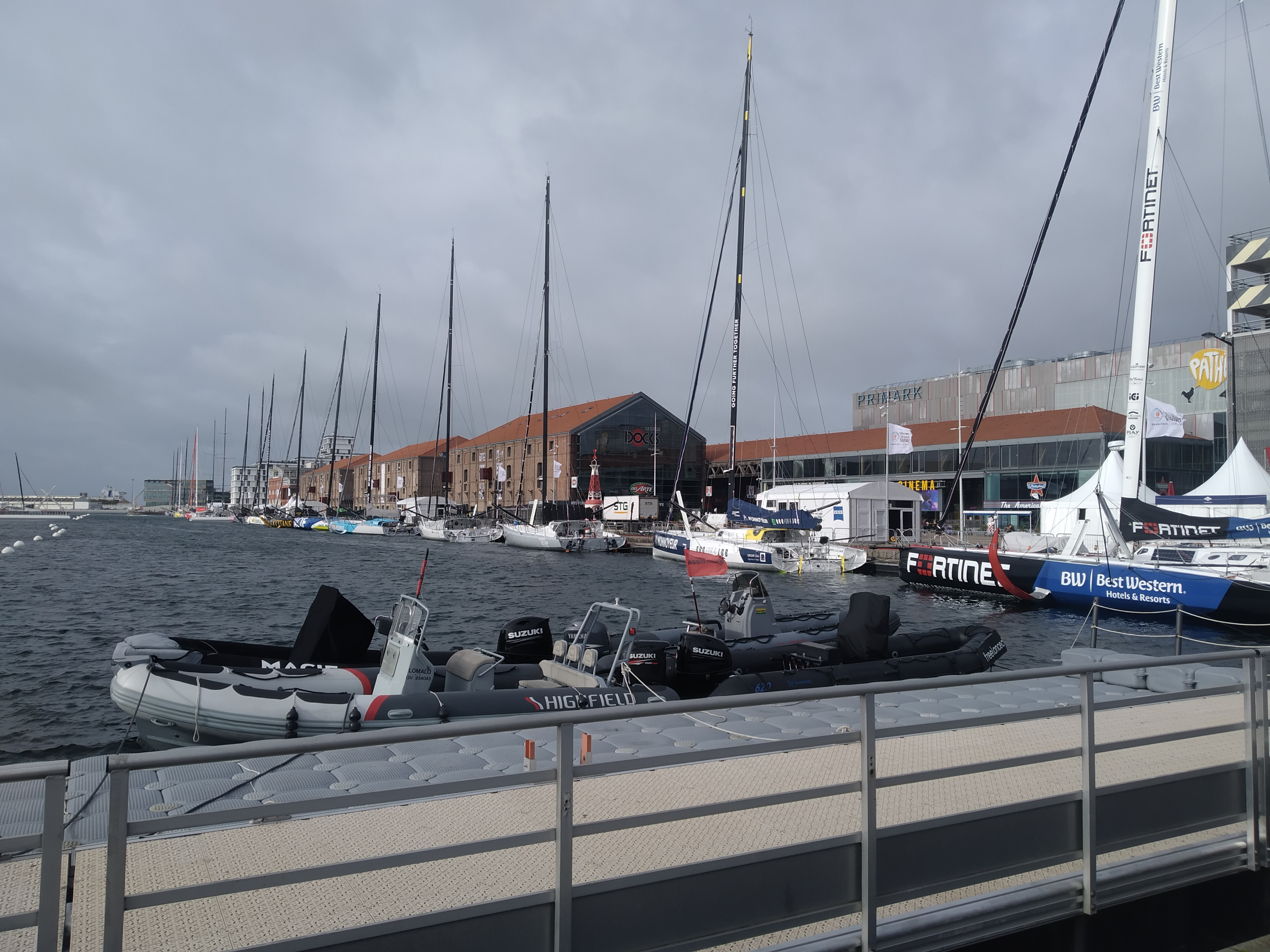
Actual course

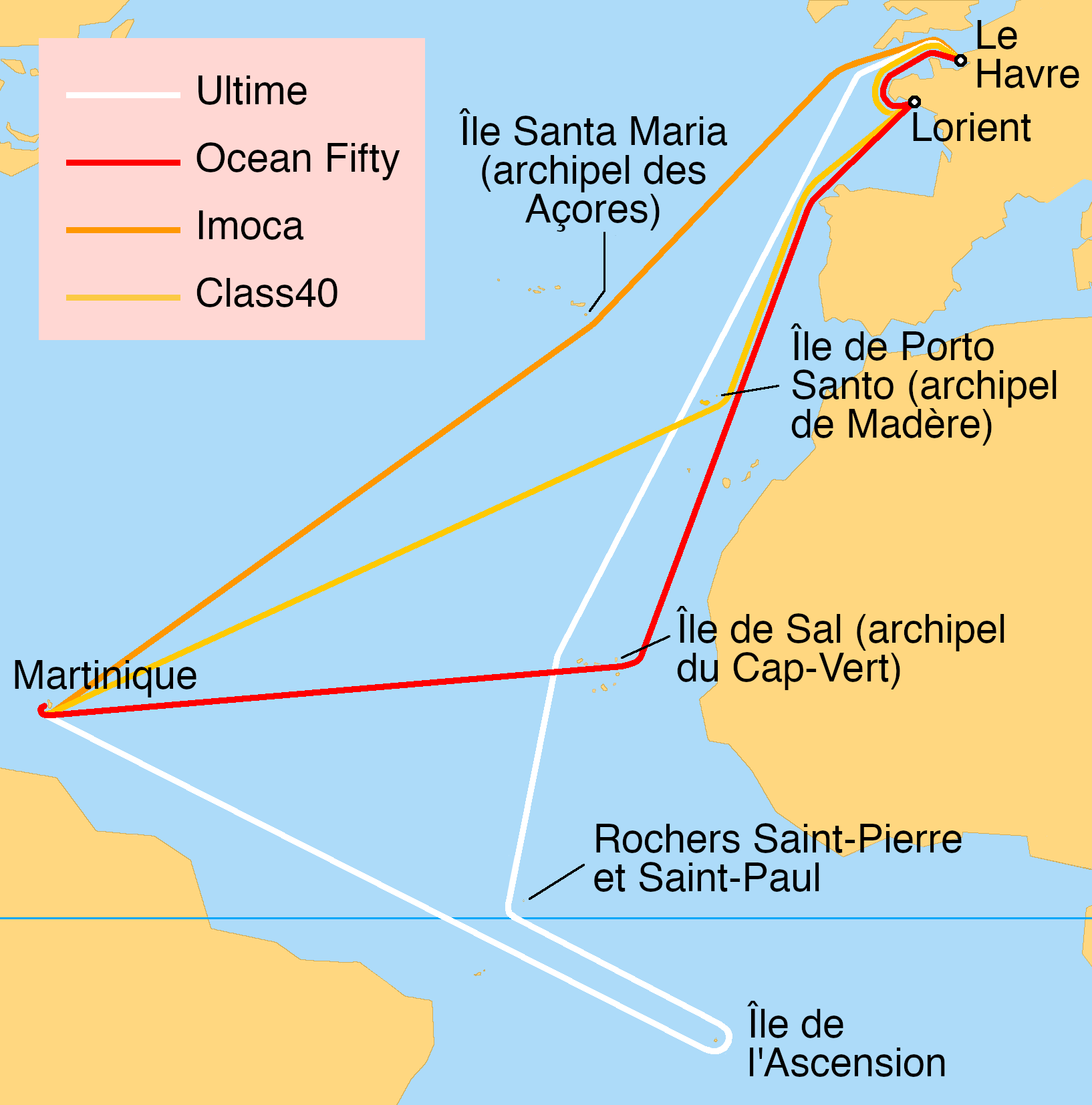
IMOCA in Le Herve Pre Start

== Results ==
=== Ultime Multihulls ===
Pos.	Crew	Boat name	Year	Date Finish (UTC)	Elapsed Time
1	Armel Le Cléac'h (FRA); Sébastien Josse (FRA)	Banque Populaire XI	2021	12/11/2023 - 22:19:50	14d 10h 14m 50s
2	François Gabart (FRA); Tom Laperche (FRA)	SVR-Lazartigue	2021	13/11/2023 - 03:10:55	14d 15h 05m 55s
3	Charles Caudrelier (FRA); Erwan Israel (FRA)	Maxi Edmond de Rothschild	2017	14/11/2023 - 21:10:43	16d 09h 05m 43s
4	Thomas Coville (FRA); Thomas Rouxel (FRA)	Sodebo Ultim 3	2019	15/11/2023 - 03:27:59	16d 15h 22m 59s
5	Thierry Chabagny (FRA); Anthony Marchand (FRA)	Actual Ultim 3	2015	15/11/2023 - 08:27:43	16d 20h 22m 43s

=== IMOCA 60 ===
Pos.	Boat			Crew		Time				Speed Rhum	Distance Sailed	Speed Water	Ref.
Pos.	Sail No.	Boat name	Year	Name	Sex	Finish Time	Elapsed	Delta	%	Speed Rhum	Distance Sailed	Speed Water	Ref.
1	FRA 59	For People	2023	Thomas Ruyant (FRA); Morgan Lagraviere (FRA)	M M	2023-11-19 - 07:02:31	11d 21h 32m 31s	0	0	13.13	5425	19.00	
2	FRA	Paprec ARKEA (6)	2023	Yoann Richomme (FRA); Yann Elies (FRA)	M M	2023-11-19 - 11:11:16	12d 01h 41m 16s	0d 04h 08m 45s	1.45	12.94	5448.8	18.81	
3	FRA 100	For the Planet	2019	Sam Goodchild (GBR); Antoine Koch (FRA)	M M	2023-11-19 - 11:20:32	12d 01h 50m 32s	0d 04h 18m 01s	1.51	12.94	5333.58	18.40	
4	FRA 3	Charal (2)	2022	Jérémie Beyou (FRA); Frank Cammas (FRA)	M M	2023-11-19 - 17:56:34	12d 08h 26m 34s	0d 10h 54m 03s	3.82	12.65	5477.16	18.48	
5	FRA 109	Initiative Coeur 4	2022	Sam Davies (GBR); Jack Bouttell (AUS)	F M	2023-11-19 - 18:13:39	12d 08h 43m 39s	0d 11h 11m 08s	3.92	12.64	5399.85	18.20	
6	FRA 8	Teamwork.net	2018	Justine Mettraux (SUI); Julien Villion (FRA)	F M	2023-11-19 - 18:29:58	12d 08h 59m 58s	0d 11h 27m 28s	4.01	12.63	4401.52	14.82	
7	MON 1297	Malizia - Seaexplorer	2022	Boris Herrmann (GER); William Harris (GBR)	M M	2023-11-19 - 18:31:03	12d 09h 01m 03s	0d 11h 28m 31s	4.02	12.63	5319.88	17.91	
8	FRA 53	V and B - Monbana - Mayenne	2022	Maxime Sorel (FRA); Christopher Pratt (FRA)	M M	2023-11-20 - 06:53:01	12d 21h 23m 01s	0d 23h 50m 30s	8.35	12.12	5390.05	17.42	
9	FRA 15	L'Occitane en Provence (2)	2019	Clarisse Cremer (FRA); Alan Roberts (GBR)	F M	2023-11-20 - 11:20:00	13d 01h 50m 00s	1d 04h 17m 29s	9.91	11.95	5321.91	16.96	
10	FRA 09	Guyot Environment - Water Family	2015	Benjamin Dutreux (FRA); Corentin Horeau (FRA)	M M	2023-11-20 - 17:26:10	13d 07h 56m 10s	1d 10h 23m 51s	12.05	11.72	5130.87	16.04	
11	ITA 34	Prysmian Group	2015	Giancarlo Pedote (ITA); Gaston Morvan (FRA)	M M	2023-11-20 - 21:17:27	13d 11h 47m 27s	1d 14h 15m 04s	13.4	11.58	5192.89	16.04	
12	GBR 77	Medallia	2015	Pip Hare (GBR); Nick Bubb (GBR)	F M	2023-11-21 - 03:12:56	13d 17h 42m 56s	1d 20h 10m 25s	15.47	11.37	4498.98	13.65	
13	FRA 30	Monnoyeur Duo For a Job	2011	Benjamin Ferré (FRA); Pierre Le Roy (FRA)	M M	2023-11-21 - 06:11:12	13d 20h 41m 12s	1d 23h 08m 41s	16.51	11.27	4291.35	12.9	
14	FRA 172	Fives Group - Lantana Environment	2006	Louis Duc (FRA); Rémi Aubrun (FRA)	M M	2023-11-21 - 11:51:34	14d 02h 21m 34s	2d 04h 49m 03s	18.5	11.08	4200.17	12.41	
15	FRA 13	Groupe Apicil	2015	Damien Seguin (FRA); Laurent Bourgues (FRA)	M M	2023-11-21 - 16:22:17	14d 06h 52m 17s	2d 09h 19m 46s	20.08	10.94	4690.05	13.68	
16	FRA 02	Bureau Vallée (2)	2020	Louis Burton (FRA); Davy Beaudart (FRA)	M M	2023-11-21 - 16:58:23	14d 07h 28m 23s	2d 09h 55m 52s	20.29	10.92	4925.1	14.34	
17	FRA 10	Fortinet - Bestwestern (2)	2015	Romain Attanasio (FRA); Loïs Berrehar (FRA)	M M	2023-11-21 - 17:00:15	14d 07h 30m 15s	2d 09h 57m 44s	20.3	10.92	5179.97	15.08	
18	FRA 112	Groupe Dubreuil	2021	Sébastien Simon (FRA); Iker Martinez (ESP)	M M	2023-11-21 - 18:23:04	14d 08h 53m 04s	2d 11h 20m 33s	20.78	10.87	4650.01	13.48	
19	SUI 7	Hublot	2019	Alan Roura (SUI); Simon Koster (SUI)	M M	2023-11-21 - 20:15:26	14d 10h 45m 26s	2d 13h 12m 55s	21.44	10.81	4993.09	14.4	
20	FRA 22	Freelance.com	2007	Guirec Soudee (FRA); Roland Jourdain (FRA)	M M	2023-11-21 - 21:02:55	14d 11h 32m 55s	2d 14h 00m 24s	21.72	10.79	4266.73	12.28	
21	FRA 01	Devenir - McDonalds	2007	Violette Dorange (FRA); Damien Guillou (FRA)	F M	2023-11-22 - 06:57:46	14d 21h 27m 46s	2d 23h 55m 15s	25.19	10.49	4958.92	13.87	
22	JPN 11	DMG Mori Global One	2019	Kojiro Shiraishi (JPN); Thierry Duprey Du Vorsent (FRA)	M M	2023-11-22 - 09:22:12	14d 23h 52m 12s	3d 02h 19m 41s	26.03	10.42	5434.02	15.1	
23	FRA 14	La Mie Câline (3)	2010	Gérald Véniard (FRA); Arnaud Boissières (FRA)	M M	2023-11-22 - 12:50:45	15d 03h 20m 45s	3d 05h 48m 14s	27.25	10.32	5160.02	14.2	
24	NZL 64	Mail Boxes Etc. (MBE)	2007	Conrad Colman (NZL); Fabio Muzzolini (FRA)	M M	2023-11-22 - 15:42:05	15d 06h 12m 05s	3d 08h 39m 34s	28.25	10.24	4924.24	13.45	
25	FRA 71	Coup de Pouce - Giffard Manutention	2007	Manuel Cousin (FRA); Clément Giraud (FRA)	M M	2023-11-23 - 13:24:36	16d 03h 54m 36s	4d 06h 22m 05s	35.85	9.67	4962.12	12.79	
26	HUN 23	New Europe	2007	Szabolcs Weöres (HUN); Irina Gravheva (RUS)	M F	2023-11-23 - 16:27:50	16d 06h 57m 50s	4d 09h 25m 19s	36.92	9.59	4466.71	11.42	
27	FRA 83	Foussier-Mon Courtier Energie	2006	Sébastien Marsset (FRA); Sophie Faguet (FRA)	M F	2023-11-23 - 23:13:30	16d 13h 43m 30s	4d 16h 10m 59s	39.29	9.43	4440.16	11.16	
28	FRA 56	Nexans - Art et Fenêtres (2)	2007	Fabrice Amedeo (FRA); Andreas Baden (GER)	M M	2023-11-24 - 07:22:40	16d 21h 52m 40s	5d 00h 20m 09s	42.14	9.24	4896.56	12.06	
29	FRA 27	MACSF (2)	2007	Isabelle Joschke (GER); Pierre Brasseur (FRA)	F M	2023-11-24 - 12:00:32	17d 02h 30m 32s	5d 04h 58m 01s	43.76	9.14	4606.58	11.22	
30	FRA 1461	Human Immobilier	2006	Antoine Cornic (FRA); Jean-Charles Luro (FRA)	M M	2023-11-24 - 17:05:15	17d 07h 35m 15s	5d 10h 02m 44s	45.54	9.02	4716.03	11.35	
31	FRA 20	Partage	2004	François Guiffant (FRA); Aymeric Belloir (FRA)	M M	2023-11-24 - 19:32:50	17d 10h 02m 50s	5d 12h 30m 19s	46.4	8.97	4679.48	11.19	
32	BEL 207	D'Ieteren Group	2014	Denis Van Weynbergh (BEL); Gilles Buekenhout (FRA)	M M	2023-11-24 - 20:09:56	17d 10h 39m 56s	5d 13h 07m 25s	46.62	8.96	4396.65	10.5	
33	CHN 5	Singchain Team Haikou	2007	Jingkun Xu (CHN); Mike Golding (GBR)	M M	2023-11-24 - 20:11:50	17d 11h 41m 50s	5d 14h 09m 19s	46.98	8.94	4376.54	10.43	
34	FRA 1000	LAZARE	2008	Tanguy Le Turquais (FRA); Félix De Navacelle (FRA)	M M	2023-12-02							
DNF	FRA 5	Stand As One	2023	Eric Bellion (FRA); Martin Le Pape (FRA)	M M								
DNF	SUI 49	Olicer Heer Ocean Racing	2007	Oliver Heer (SUI); David Ledroit (SUI)	M M	Rigging Failured							
DNF	FRA 17	Maitre Coq V	2022	Yannick Bestaven (FRA); Julien Pulve (FRA)	M M								
DNF	FRA 2030	Biotherm	2022	Paul Meilhat (FRA); Mariana Lobato (POR)	M F								
DNF	CAN 80	Be Water Positive	2011	Scott Shawyer (CAN); Nick Maloney (NZL)	M M	Day 2 - Retired Unaided to Gosport (Medical Issue with Scott)							
DNF	FRA 79	MACIF Santé Prévoyance	2023	Charlie Dalin (FRA); Pascal Bidegorry (FRA)	M M	Retired Unaided to Le Herve (Medical Issue with Charlie)							

=== Multi 50 ===
Pos.	Crew	Boat name	Boat Age	Date Finish	Elapsed Time	Notes	Ref.
1	Thibaut Vauchel Camus (FRA); Quentin Vlamynck (FRA)	Solidaires En Peloton		17/11/2023 - 01:07:40	11d 11h 22m 27s		
2	Fabrice Cahierc (FRA); Aymeric Chappellier (FRA)	Réalités		17/11/2023 - 08:35:53	11d 22h 42m 58s		
3	Pierre Quiroga (FRA); Ronan Treussart (FRA)	Viabilis Ocean		17/11/2023 - 13:30:12	12j 01h 53m 01s		
DNF	Sébastien Rogues (FRA); Jean-Babtiste Gellée (FRA)	Primonial					
DNF	Luke Berry (FRA); Antoine Joubert (FRA)	Le Rire Médecin - Lamotte					
DNF	Erwan Le Roux (FRA); Audrey Ogereau (FRA)	Koesio					

=== Class 40 ===
Pos.	Boat				Crew		Time				Speed Rhum	Distance Sailed	Speed Water	Ref.
Pos.	Sail No.	Boat name	Design	Year	Name	Sex	Finish Time	Elapsed	Delta	%	Speed Rhum	Distance Sailed	Speed Water	Ref.
1	ITA 181	Alla Grande PIRELLI	Musa 40	2022	Ambriogio Beccaria (ITA); Nicolas Andrieu (FRA)	M M	2023-11-23 - 13:01:36	18d 12h 21m 55s	0	0	9.10	5381.51	12.11	
2	FRA 182	Amarris	Lift V2	2022	Achille Nebout (FRA); Gildas Mahe (FRA)	M M	2023-11-23 - 19:26:50	18d 20h 20m 14s	0d 07h 58m 19s	1.79	8.94	5293.62	11.70	
3	FRA 186	IBSA Group	Mach 40.5	2022	Alberto Bona (FRA); Pablo Santurde Del Arco (FRA)	M M	2023-11-23 - 20:09:42	18d 21h 22m 47s	0d 09h 00m 52s	2.03	8.92	5466.28	12.06	
4	FRA 177	Everial	Pogo S4	2022	Erwan Le Draoulec (FRA); Tanguy Leglatin (FRA)	M M	2023-11-23 - 21:00:34	18d 22h 13m 15s	0d 09h 51m 20s	2.22	8.91	5462.48	12.03	
5	GBR 159	Tquila	Mach 40.4	2019	Alister Richardson (GBR); Brian Thompson (GBR)	M M	2023-11-23 - 21:11:29	18d 23h 01m 08s	0d 10h 39m 13s	2.4	8.89	5494.4	12.08	
6	FRA 178	GroupeSNEF	Pogo S4	2022	Xavier Macaire (FRA); Pierre Leboucher (FRA)	M M	2023-11-23 - 22:52:23	18d 23h 28m 11s	0d 11h 06m 16s	2.5	8.88	5207.55	11.43	
7	FRA 175	Inter Invest	Max 40	2022	Matthieu Perraut (FRA); Kevin Bloch (FRA)	M M	2023-11-24 - 01:09:48	19d 01h 51m 00s	0d 13h 29m 05s	3.03	8.83	5545.94	12.11	
8	ITA 193	Influence 2	Musa 40	2023	Andrea Fornaro (ITA); Benoit Hantzperg (FRA)	M M	2023-11-24 - 00:53:05	19d 02h 11m 25s	0d 13h 49m 30s	3.11	8.83	5414.67	11.82	
9	FRA 195	Vogue Avec Un Crohn	Mach 40.5	2023	Pierre-Louis Attwell (FRA); Maxime Bensa (FRA)	M M	2023-11-24 - 07:14:24	19d 08h 28m 13s	0d 20h 06m 18s	4.52	8.71	5415.31	11.66	
10	FRA 165	Edenred	Mach 40.4	2021	Emmanuel Le Roch (FRA); Basile Bourgnon (FRA)	M M	2023-11-24 - 07:24:35	19d 09h 03m 15s	0d 20h 41m 20s	4.66	8.7	5374.64	11.56	
11	FRA 162	Project Rescue Ocean	Max 40	2020	Axel Trehin (FRA); Gwenael Riou (FRA)	M M	2023-11-24 - 08:09:20	19d 09h 04m 29s	0d 20h 42m 34s	4.66	8.7	5550.5	11.93	
12	FRA 183	Centrakor	Lift V2	2022	Mikael Mergui (FRA); Ludovic Mechin (FRA)	M M	2023-11-24 - 08:21:14	19d 09h 46m 25s	0d 21h 24m 30s	4.82	8.68	5328.67	11.44	
13	FRA 170	La Boulangere Bio	Max 40	2021	Amelie Grassi (FRA); Anne-Claire Le Berre (FRA)	F F	2023-11-24 - 08:40:22	19d 09h 58m 11s	0d 21h 36m 16s	4.86	8.68	5480.64	11.76	
14	FRA 197	Seafrigo - Sogestran	Mach 40.5	2023	Cedric Château (FRA); Guillaume Pirouelle (FRA)	M M	2023-11-24 - 08:30:57	19d 10h 19m 23s	0d 21h 57m 28s	4.94	8.67	5351.92	11.48	
15	GER 189	Sign For Com	Pogo S4	2022	Lennart Burke (FRA); Melwin Fink (FRA)	M M	2023-11-24 - 07:27:26	19d 11h 05m 41s	0d 22h 43m 46s	5.12	8.66	5054.14	10.82	
16	FRA 198	WasabIII	Pogo S4	2023	Stephane Bodin (FRA); Swann Hayewski (FRA)	M M	2023-11-24 - 10:39:06	19d 12h 27m 32s	1d 00h 05m 37s	5.42	8.63	5084.83	10.85	
17	FRA 196	Alternative Sailing-Constructions du Belon	Mach 40.5	2023	Estelle Greck (FRA); Mathieu Jones (FRA)	F M	2023-11-24 - 10:32:33	19d 13h 37m 04s	1d 01h 15m 09s	5.68	8.61	5342.07	11.38	
18	FRA 176	Cafe Joyeux	Lift V2	2021	Nicolas D'Estais (FRA); Leo Debiesse (FRA)	M M	2023-11-24 - 01:06:09	19d 14h 57m 05s	1d 02h 35m 10s	5.98	8.59	5445.61	11.56	
19	FRA 158	Crédit Mutuel	Max 40	2019	Ian Lipinski (FRA); Antoine Carpentier (FRA)	M M	2023-11-23 - 18:43:20	19d 16h 02m 13s	1d 03h 40m 26s	6.23	8.57	5305.48	11.24	
20	FRA 163	Amipi - Tombelaine Coquillages	Pogo S4	2021	Baptiste Hulin (FRA); Christophe Bachmann (FRA)	M M	2023-11-24 - 10:03:30	19d 18h 15m 27s	1d 05h 53m 32s	6.73	8.53	5499.17	11.6	
21	FRA 172	Team Zeiss-Weecycling	Pogo S4	2021	Thimote Polet (FRA); Pierrick Letouze (FRA)	M M	2023-11-24 - 19:09:59	19d 21h 12m 54s	1d 08h 50m 59s	7.39	8.48	5274.15	11.05	
22	199	Legallais	Lift V2	2023	Fabien Delahaye (FRA); Corentin Douguet (FRA)	M M	2023-11-24 - 23:18:10	20d 00h 08m 30s	1d 11h 46m 35s	8.05	8.42	5263.15	10.96	
23	FRA 185	La Manche #Evidence Nautique	Mach 40.5	2022	Nicolas Jossier (FRA); Alexis Loison (FRA)	M M	2023-11-24 - 23:29:41	20d 03h 50m 27s	1d 15h 28m 32s	8.88	8.36	5258.37	10.87	
24	FRA 153	Nestenn - Entrepreneurs Pour La Planete	Mach 40.3	2018	Jules Bonnier (FRA); Robin Follin (FRA)	M M	2023-11-25 - 05:47:38	20d 08h 24m 57s	1d 20h 03m 02s	9.91	8.28	5124.72	10.49	
25	FRA 174	Captain Alternance	Lift V2	2021	Keni Piperol (FRA); Thomas Jourdren (FRA)	M M	2023-11-25 - 10:54:58	20d 15h 31m 23s	2d 03h 09m 28s	11.51	8.16	5409.14	10.92	
26	FRA 166	Crosscall	Lift v2	2021	Aurelien Ducroz (FRA); Vincent Riou (FRA)	M M	2023-11-25 - 15:51:49	20d 17h 33m 42s	2d 05h 11m 47s	11.97	8.13	5314.51	10.68	
27	FRA 161	L'Envol-Kermarrec Promotion	Raison	2020	Anatole Facon (FRA); Alice Valiergue (25x17px)	M F	2023-11-25 - 22:12:40	21d 11h 50m 48s	2d 23h 28m 53s	16.09	7.84	5151.63	9.99	
28	FRA 152	P - Eden Park - Les Papillons du Ciel	Tiz'h 40	2018	Nicolas Bombrun (FRA); Paul Brandel (FRA)	M M	2023-11-26 - 12:32:16	21d 20h 11m 47s	3d 07h 49m 52s	17.97	7.72	5011.14	9.56	
29	FRA 154	Engie - DFDS - Brittany Ferries	Lift 40	2018	Pamela Lee (IRL); Tiphaine Ragueneau (FRA)	F F	2023-11-26 - 17:24:40	21d 23h 01m 13s	3d 10h 39m 18s	18.6	7.68	5064.18	9.61	
31	FRA 101	Vogue Le Monde	Pogo 40S2	2011	Benoit Lequin (FRA); Stephane Hunot (FRA)	M M	2023-11-28 - 12:21:28	23d 22h 27m 47s	5d 10h 05m 52s	29.28	7.04	4834.1	8.41	
32	FRA 115	P - Trimcontrol	Mach 40	2012	Alexandre Le Gallais (FRA); Carlo Vroon (NED)	M M	2023-11-29 - 12:23:40	25d 00h 12m 48s	6d 11h 50m 53s	35.07	6.74	5400.18	9	
33	FRA 147	P - Label Emmaus	Mabire-Nivelt	2016	Jerome Lesieur (FRA); Damien Jenner (FRA)	M M	2023-11-29 - 20:05:20	25d 06h 09m 42s	6d 17h 47m 47s	36.41	6.67	5220.86	8.61	
-	FRA 88	Google Chrome	Tyker 40 Evolution 2	2010	Kieran Le Borgne (FRA); Basile Buisson (FRA)	M M								
-	FRA 104	Martinique Tchalian	Mach40	2011	Herve Jean-Marie (FRA); Jean-Yves Aglae (LCA)	M M								
-	ANG 107	P - Mussulo 40	Kiwi 40FC	2011	Jose Guilherme Caldas (FRA); Gustavo Peixoto (FRA)	M M								
-	FRA 135	P - Le Bleuet de France	Pogo 40S3	2014	Charlotte Cormouls-Houles (FRA); Claire-Victoire De Fleurian (FRA)	F F								
-	FRA 98	Qwanza	Tyker 40 Evolution 2	2010	Goulven Marie (FRA); Nicolas Battesti (FRA)	M M								
ABD	FRA 157	P - Sotraplant-TRS	Cape 40	2019	Matthieu Foulquier-Gazagnes (FRA); Michel Milanese (FRA)	M M								
ABD	FRA 191	Movember	Pogo S4	2023	Bertrand Guillonneau (FRA); Kito De Pavant (FRA)	M M								
ABD	FRA 32	P - Reve À Perte de Vue	LNM40	2006	Joel Paris (FRA); Jerome Ragimbeau (FRA)	M M								
ABD	FRA 168	The Sea Cleaners - Universe - ENSM	Cape Racing scow 40	2021	Renaud Courbon (FRA); François Champion (FRA)	M M								
ABD	FRA 187	Curium Life Forward	Lift V2	2022	Marc Lepesqueux (FRA); Renaud Dehareng (FRA)	M M								
