= 2019 Transat Jacques Vabre =

The 2019 of the Transat Jacques Vabre was the 14th edition and was raced from Le Havre, France, to Salvador de Bahia, Brazil.

- 1st IMOCA 60 : Charlie Dalin (FRA) and Yann Eliès (FRA) on Apivia in 13 days, 12 hrs 8 minutes;
- 1st Multi50 : Gilles Lamiré (FRA) and Antoine Carpentier (FRA) on Groupe GCA – Mille et un sourires en 11 days, 16 hrs, 34 minutes et 41 secondes;
- 1st Class40 : Ian Lipinski (FRA) and Adrien Hardy (FRA) on Crédit Mutuel in 17 days, 16 hrs, 21 minutes et 23 secondes

== IMOCA 60 ==
Pos.	Crew	Boat name	Boat Age	Date Finish	Elapsed Time
1	Charlie Dalin (FRA); Yann Eliès (FRA)	Apivia	2019	13d 12h 8m	13,42
2	Kevin Escoffier (FRA); Nicolas Lunven (FRA)	PRB 4	2009	14d 03h 49m 42s	12,80
2	Jérémie Beyou (FRA); Christopher Pratt (FRA)	Charal	2018	14d 03h 56m	12,80
4	Charlie Enright (USA); Pascal Bidégorry (FRA)	11th Hour Racing	2015	14d 06h 10m 23s	12,71
5	Thomas Ruyant (FRA); Antoine Koch (FRA)	Advens for Cybersecurity	2019	14d 07h 55m 41s	12,65
6	Clarisse Crémer (FRA); Armel Le Cléac'h (FRA)	Banque Populaire X	2011	14d 08h 46m 24s	12,62
7	Samantha Davies (GBR); Paul Meilhat (FRA)	Initiatives Coeur (3)	2010	14d 09h 30m 44s	12,59
8	Sébastien Simon (FRA); Vincent Riou (FRA)	Arkea-Paprec	2019	14d 15h 05m 53s	12,39
9	Fabrice Amedeo (FRA); Éric Péron (FRA)	Newrest; Art & Fenêtres	2015	14d 16h 01m 07 secondes	12,36
10	Louis Burton (FRA); Davy Beaudart (FRA)	Bureau Vallée 2	2015	14d 16m 21m 43s	12,35
11	Yannick Bestaven (FRA); Roland Jourdain (FRA)	Maître Coq IV	2015	14d 22h 6m 23s	12,15
12	Boris Herrmann (GER); Will Harris (GBR)	Malizia II Yacht; Club de Monaco	2015	14d 22h 28m 43s	12,13
13	Nicolas Troussel (FRA); Jean Le Cam (FRA)	Corum l'épargne	2007	14d 23h 26m 30s	12,10
14	Damien Seguin (FRA); Yoann Richomme (FRA)	Groupe Apicil	2008	15d 08h 17m 21s	11,81
15	Romain Attanasio (FRA); Sébastien Marsset (FRA)	Pure	2007	15d 10h 11m 10s	11,75
16	Maxime Sorel (FRA); Guillaume Le Brec (FRA)	V and B – Mayenne	2007	15d 14h 48m 24s	11,61
17	Giancarlo Pedote (ITA); Anthony Marchand (FRA)	Prysmian Group	2015	15d 15h 26m 57s	11,59
18	Arnaud Boissières (FRA); Xavier Macaire (FRA)	La Mie Câline; Artipôle	2007	15d 20h 9m 47s	11,44
19	Benjamin Dutreux (FRA); Thomas Cardrin (FRA)	Water Family	2006	16d 00h 19m 18s	11,32
20	Stéphane Le Diraison (FRA); François Guiffant (FRA)	Time for Oceans	2007	16d 01h 16m 31s	11,29
21	Alan Roura (SUI); Sébastien Audigane (FRA)	La Fabrique (2)	2007	16d 05h 13m 30s	11,18
22	Manuel Cousin (FRA); Gildas Morvan (FRA)	Groupe Setin	2007	16d 11h 22m 47s	11,00
23	Miranda Merron (GBR); Halvard Mabire (FRA)	Campagne de France	2006	17d 10h 51m 03s	10,39
24	Pip Hare (GBR); Ysbrand Endt (NED)	Pip Hare; Ocean Racing	2000	18d 05h 11m 43s	9,95
25	Alexia Barrier (FRA); Joan Mulloy (IRL)	4MyPlanet	1998	18d 05h 22m 05s	9,95
26	Ari Huusela (FIN); Michael Ferguson (IRL)	Ariel 2	2007	18d 23h 07m 14 s	9,56
27	Erik Nigon (FRA); Tolga Ekrem Pamir (TUR)	Vers un monde sans SIDA	2006	19d 01h 42m 16s	9,50
RET	Isabelle Joschke (FRA); Morgan Lagravière (FRA)	MACSF	2007	Retired on 7 November	
RET	Alex Thomson (GBR); Neal McDonald (GBR)	Hugo Boss 7	2019	Retired follow a collision	

== Multi 50 ==
Pos.	Crew	Boat Age	Boat name	Date Finish	Elapsed Time	Notes	Ref.
1	Gilles Lamiré (FRA); Antoine Carpentier (FRA)	2009	Groupe GCA – Mille et un sourires	.08 Nov	11d 16h 34m 41s	15,50	
2	Thibaut Vauchel-Camus (FRA); Fred Duthil (FRA)	2017	Solidaires en Peloton – ARSEP	.08 Nov	12d 02h 38m 01s	14,97	
3	Sébastien Rogues (FRA); Matthieu Souben (FRA)	2009	Primonial	.09 Nov	13d 00h 09m 42s	13,94	

== Class 40 ==
Pos.	Crew	Hull No.	Boat name	Date Finish	Elapsed Time	Notes
1	Ian Lipinski (FRA); Adrien Hardy (FRA)	158	Crédit Mutuel	.14 Nov	17d 16h 21m 23s	10,25
2	Sam Goodchild (GBR); Fabien Delahaye (FRA)	FRA 156	Leyton	.14 Nov	18d 00h 43m 11s	10,05
3	Aymeric Chappellier (FRA); Pierre Leboucher (FRA)	FRA 151	Aïna Enfance & Avenir	.14 Nov	18d 04h 06m 45s	9,97
4	Simon Koster (SUI); Valentin Gautier (SUI)	159	Banque du Léman	.15 Nov	18d 12h 29m 04s	9,79
5	Louis Duc (FRA); Aurélien Ducroz (FRA)	FRA 150	Crosscall Chamonix Mont-Blanc	.15 Nov	18d 15h 25m 23s	9,72
6	Jörg Riechers (GER); Cédric Château (FRA)	FRA 157	Linkt	.15 Nov	18d 20h 56m 36s	9,60
7	Kito de Pavant (FRA); Achille Nebout (FRA)	FRA 125	Made In Midi	.15 Nov	18d 22h 56m 52s	9,56
8	Bertrand de Broc (FRA); Vincent Leblay (FRA)	FRA 148	Cre'Actuel – Côtes d'Armor	.16 Nov	19d 11h 20m 37s	9,31
9	Thibault Hector (FRA); Christophe Bachmann (FRA)	152	Rennes.Saint-Malo/Mer Entreprendre	.16 Nov	19d 17h 40m 08s	9,18
10	Catherine Pourre (FRA); Pietro Luciani (ITA)	FRA 145	Eärendil	.16 Nov	19d 22h 10m 19s	9,10
11	Pierre-Louis Atttwell (FRA); Calliste Antoine (FRA)	FRA 135	Vogue avec un Crohn	.16 Nov	19d 22h 43m 46s	9,09
12	Emmanuel Le Roch (FRA); Basile Bourgnon (FRA)	FRA 100	Edenred	.16 Nov	20d 00h 00m 41s	9,06
13	Yves Courbon (FRA); Renaud Courbon (FRA)	115	A chacun son Everest	.16 Nov	20d 03h 08m 07s	9,00
14	Mathieu Claveau (FRA); Christophe Fialon (FRA)	89	Prendre la Mer, Agir pour la forêt	.16 Nov	20d 03h 26m 13s	9,00
15	Jean-Baptiste Daramy (FRA); Alexandre Hamlyn (FRA)	109	Chocolat Paries – Coriolis Composites	.16 Nov	20d 04h 24m 30s	8,98
16	Soenke Bruhns (GER); Arnt Bruhns (GER)	FRA 138	Iskareen	.17 Nov	21d 07h 19m 37s	8,51
17	Pierrick Letouzé (FRA); Simon Kervarrec (FRA)	FRA 139	E.Leclerc	.18 Nov	22d 01h 22m 55s	8,22
18	Martin Louchart (FRA); Frédéric Duchemin (FRA)	113	#Attitudemanche	.19 Nov	22d 15h 48m 01s	8,00
19	Pierre-Antoine Tesson (FRA); Paul Gallet (FRA)	30	Kerhis	.19 Nov	22d 16h 54m 20s	7,98
20	Morgane Ursault-Poupon (FRA); Rémi Lhotellier (FRA)	FRA 30	UP Sailing, Unis pour la Planète	.19 Nov	22d 21h 10m 36s	7,92
21	Florian Gueguen (FRA); Raphael Auffret (FRA)	1	Equipe voile Parkinson	.21 Nov	25d 00h 09m 09s	7,25
22	Georges Guigen (FRA); Erwann de Kerros (FRA)	101	Terre Exotique	.21 Nov	25d 02h 53m 31s	7,22
ABN	Charles-Louis Mourruau (FRA); Estelle Greck (FRA)	141	Entraide Marine-Adosm	Abandon on the 1st Nov		
ABN	Hiroshi Kitada (JPN); Takeshi Hara (JPN)	FRA 146	Kiho	Abandon on the 29 Oct		
ABN	Luke Berry (FRA); Tanguy Le Turquais (FRA)	153	Lamotte – Module Création	Abandon on the 28 Oct		
ABN	Pascal Fravalo (FRA); Guillaume Goumy (FRA)	154	SOS Méditerranée	Abandon on the 28 Oct		
ABN	William Mathelin-Moreaux (FRA); Marc Guillemot (FRA)		Beijaflore	Abandon		
