= Benjamin Ferré =

French offshore yachtsman

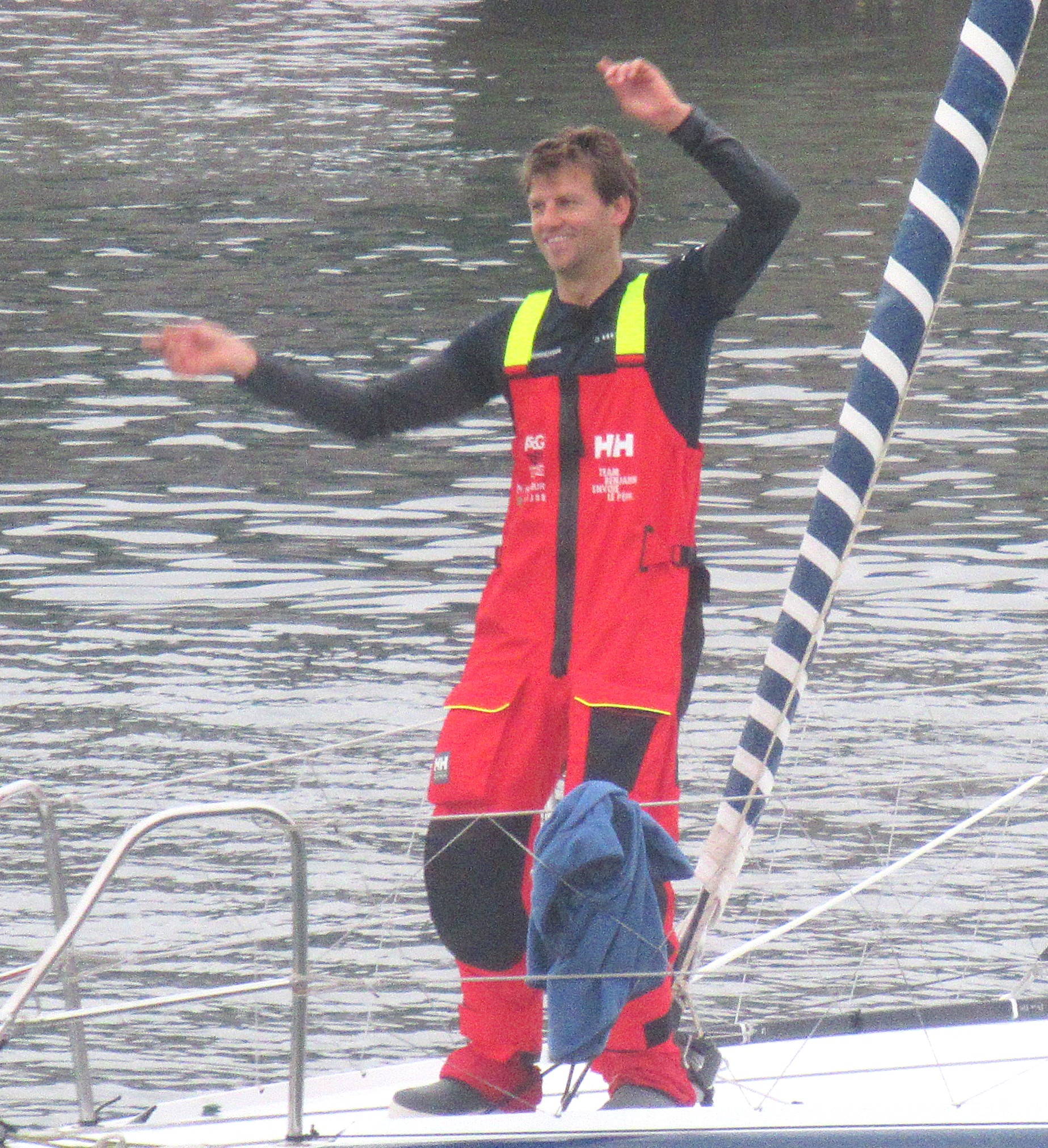
- At the start of the 2024-2025 Vendée Globe

Personal information
- Nationality: French
- Born: 31 October 1990 (age 35) Rennes, France
- Occupation: Offshore Sailor

Sailing career
- Sport: Sailing

Benjamin Ferré born 31 October 1990 is a French professional offshore sailor.

== Results ==
Pos	Year	Race	Class	Boat name	Time	Notes	Ref
Round the world races
16 / 40	2024/25	2024-2025 Vendée Globe	IMOCA 60	Monnoyeur Duo For A Job		First none foiler	
Transatlantic Races
13 / 40	2023	Transat Jacques Vabre	IMOCA 60	MONNOYEUR DUO FOR A JOB , FRA 30	13d 20h 41m 12s	with Pierre Le Roy (FRA)	
15 / 38	2022	2022 Route du Rhum	IMOCA 60	Monnoyeur - Duo for a job, FRA 30	13d 15h 39m 30s		
Other Races
