= Charlie Dalin =

French sailor (1984–2026)

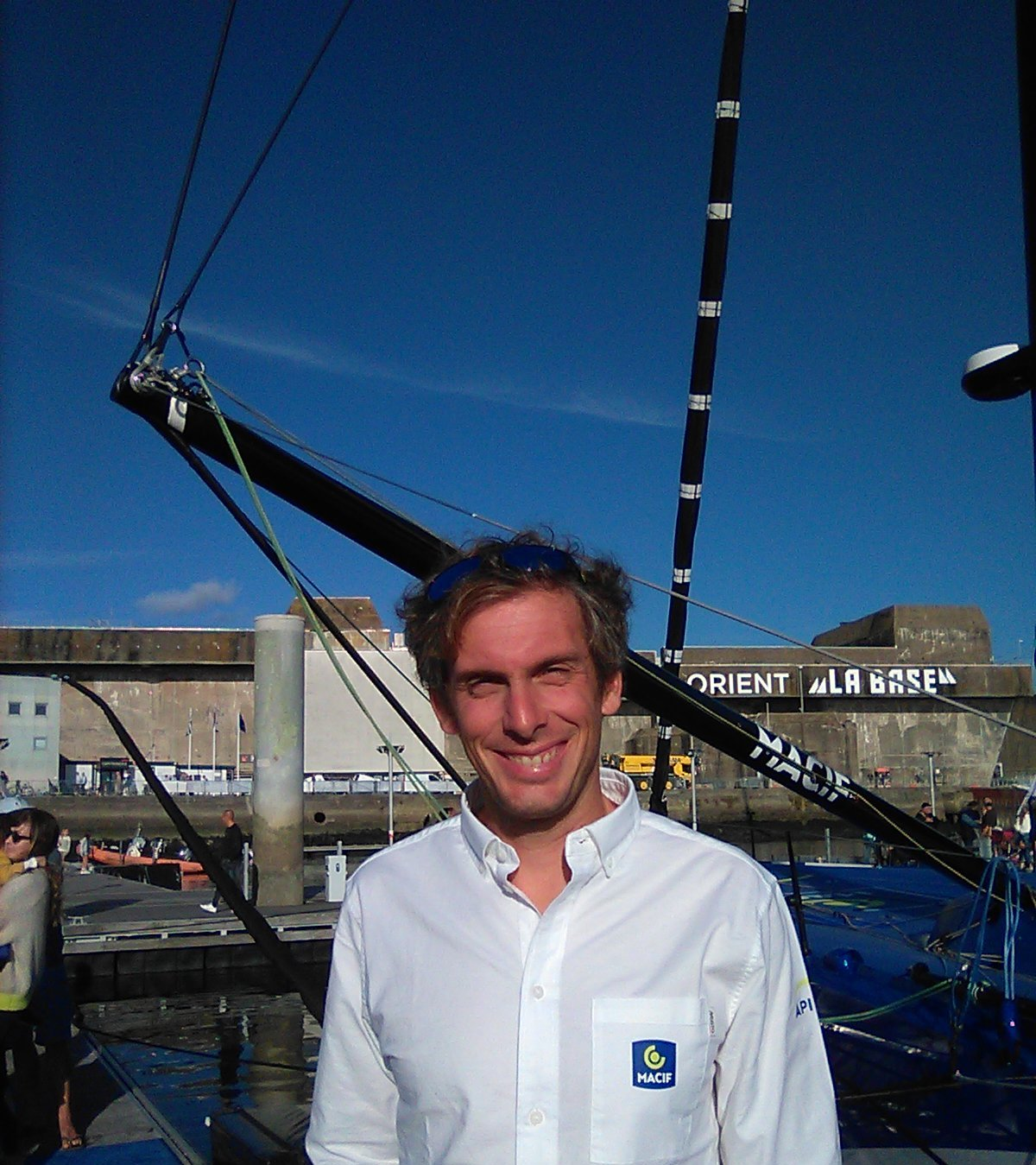
- Dalin in 2023

Personal information
- Full name: Charlie Claude Antoine Dalin
- Nationality: French
- Born: 10 May 1984 Harfleur, France
- Died: 10 June 2026 (aged 42) Quimper, France

Sailing career
- Sport: Sailing
- Class: IMOCA 60

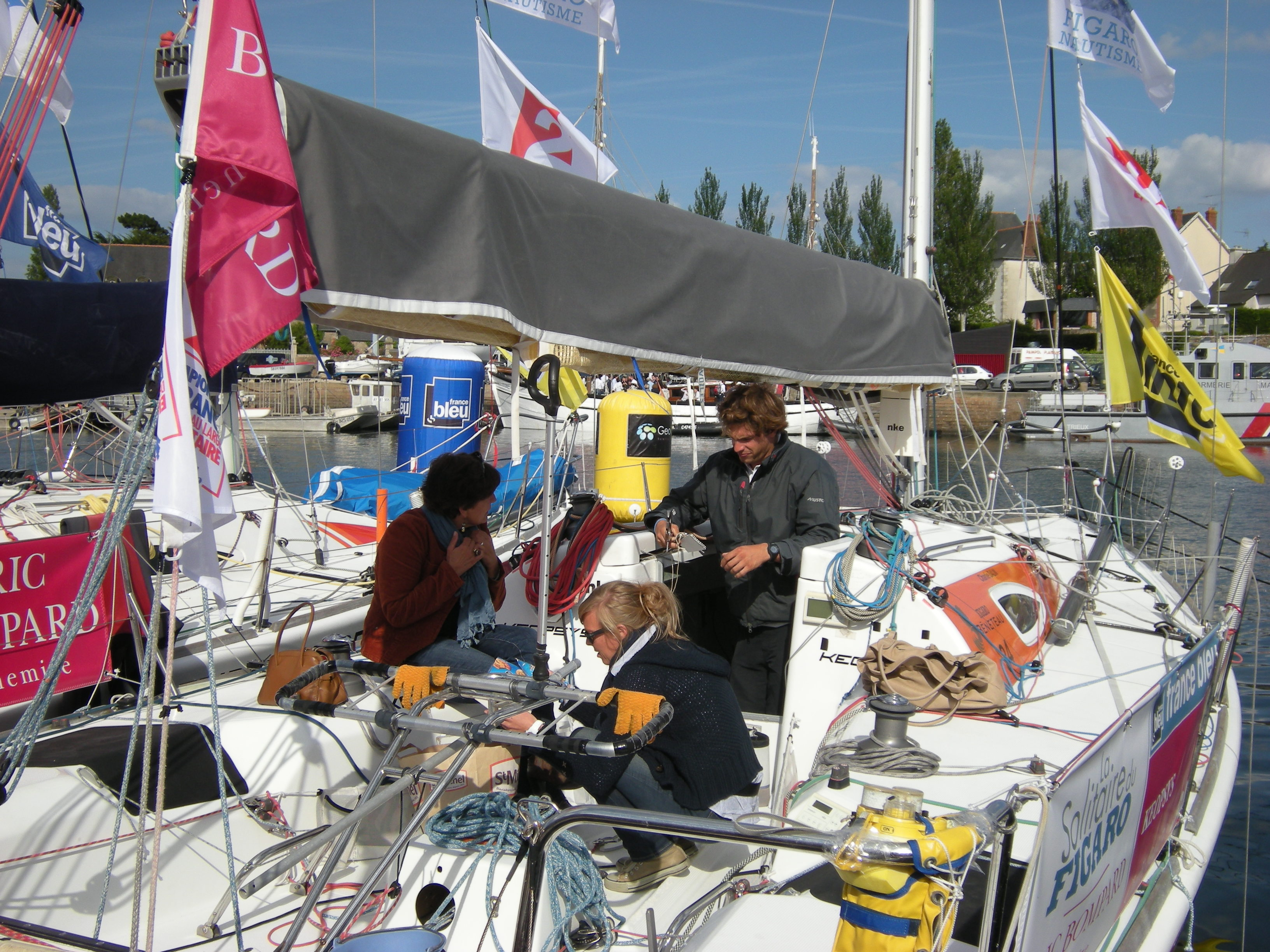
Charlie Dalin at the Solitaire du Figaro 2012 Paimpol (23 June 2012)

Charlie Dalin (Note: French pronunciation: [ʃaʁli dalɛ̃]) (10 May 1984 – 10 June 2026) was a French offshore sailor. He won the 2024–2025 Vendée Globe which is the pinnacle race held every four years for sailing non-stop around the world. He completed the race with a time of 64 days 19 hours 22 minutes and 49 smashing the previous record by 9 days 8 hours 12 minutes and 57 seconds which also set the monohull around the world sailing record. He completed this race while battling gastrointestinal cancer, taking immunotherapy pills during the race.

== Early life ==
Dalin started sailing dinghies at a young age in the Optimist and 420. After school he moved to England to study for a Naval Architecture degree from the University of Southampton.

== Professional career ==
Dalin started yacht racing, competing on both sides of the Channel, racing the Farr 30 in the Tour de France à la voile, and on the Farr 52s Chernikeeff 2 and Bear of Britain at events such as Cowes Week, the Commodores' Cup and Round the Island Race on the.

In the 2020–2021 Vendée Globe he was the first to finish with a time of 80 days 6 hours 15 minutes and 47 seconds but was classified second due to redress.

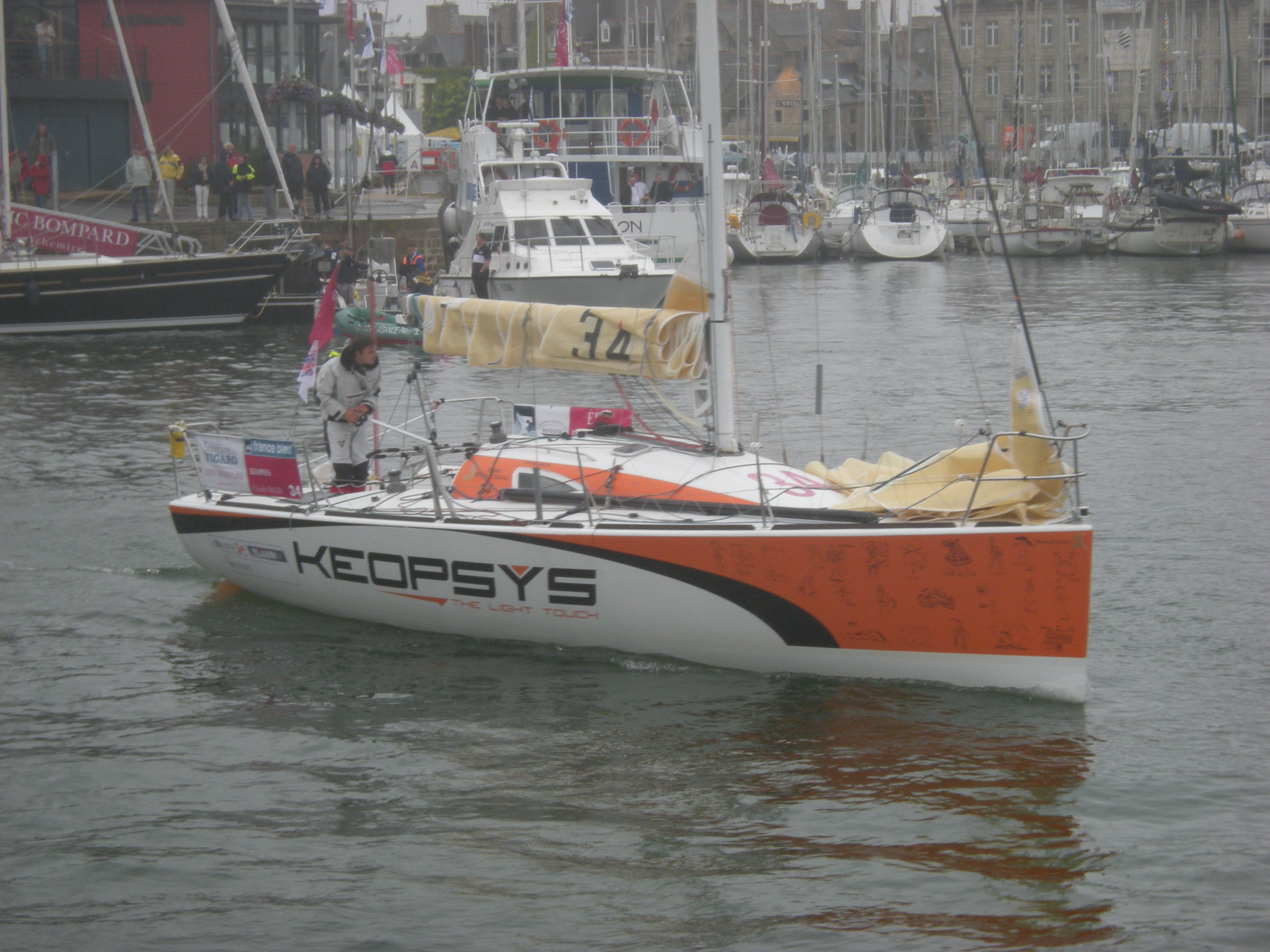
Charlie Dalin aboard Keopsys in 2012

Dalin was also IMOCA world champion in 2021 and 2022. In 2023 he launched his new sailing yacht MACIF, an IMOCA 60 monohull.

=== Distinctions ===
In 2025 he received a World Sailing World Sailor of the Year Award with fellow Vendee Globe competitor Justine Mettraux winning the female category. Also in 2025, he was awarded Knight of the Legion of Honour in France.

=== Sailing highlights ===
Pos	Year	Race	Class	Boat name	Notes	Ref
Round the world races
1	2024‍–‍25	2024–2025 Vendée Globe	IMOCA 60	Macif (2023)	64d 16h 22m 49s	
2	2020‍–‍21	2020–2021 Vendée Globe	IMOCA 60	Apivia (2019)	80d 06h 15m 47s	
Transatlantic Race
2	2022	Route du Rhum	IMOCA 60	Apivia (2019)	11d 19h 38m 11s	
2	2021	Transat Jacques Vabre	IMOCA 60	Apivia (2019)	with Paul Meilhat	
1	2019	Transat Jacques Vabre	IMOCA 60	Apivia (2019)	with Yann Elies	
DNF	2016	Transat AG2R	Figaro 2	MACIF 2015	with Yoann Richomme	
3 / 20	2015	Transat Jacques Vabre	IMOCA 60	Quéguiner – Leucémie Espoir, FRA 029	17d 10h 01m with Yann Elies	
RET	2014	Transat AG2R	Figaro 2	CERCLE VERT	with Gildas Morvan	
1	2012	Transat AG2R	Figaro 2	Green Circle	with Gildas Morvan	
2	2009	Mini Transat Race	Mini Transat; Pogo 2			
Other Results
1	2022	Vendée Arctique	IMOCA 60	Apivia (2019)	Vendee Qualifier	
1	2021	Defi Azimut				
1	2021	Syz Translemanique en Solitaire				
8	2020	Défi Azimut				
2	2020	Vendée-Arctique-Les Sables d'Olonne				
3	2018	La Solitaire Urgo Le Figaro				
6	2018	La Solo maitre Coq				
1	2017	Douarnenez Fastnet Solo				
1	2016	Douarnenez Horta Solo				
3	2017	La Solitaire Urgo Le Figaro	Figaro 2	SKIPPER MACIF 2015		
2	2016	La Solitaire du Figaro	Figaro 2	MACIF 2015		
2	2015	Solo Basse Normandie				
2 / 9	2015	Rolex Fastnet Race	IMOCA 60	Quéguiner – Leucémie Espoir, FRA 029	03d 01h 28m with Yann Elies	
2	2015	La Solitaire du Figaro	Figaro 2			
3	2014	La Solitaire du Figaro	Figaro 2			
1	2014	Championnat de France de Course au Large				
3	2014	Le Havre All Mer Cup				
2	2014	Lorient - Horta Solo				
1	2013	Rolex Fastnet Race	Figaro			
	2013	Tour de France à la Voile	M34			
1	2013	Record SNSM				
3	2012	Med-Race	M34			
	2011	Solo Basse Normandie	Figaro			
	2010	Record SNSM				
2	2008	Rolex Sydney to Hobart Yacht Race	Sydney 38	The Goat	Crew	
	2008	Les Sables - Les Açores - Les Sables	Mini Transat; Pogo 2			
1	2004	Round The Island Race		Farr 52	Crew	
1	2004	RORC Commodore's Cup		Farr 52	Crew	

== Death ==
Dalin died in Quimper, France, at the age of 42, during the night of 10-11 June 2026. He had been battling gastrointestinal cancer for two and a half years. He wrote about his illness in his biography, La Force du destin, published by Gallimard in October 2025, making clear his determination not to let the cancer diagnosis get in the way of his life.

== Publications ==
- Book: La force du destin (The force of destiny)

== Media appearances ==
- Sailing Home (2004) as himself
