= Szabolcs Weöres =

Hungarian Offshore yachtsman

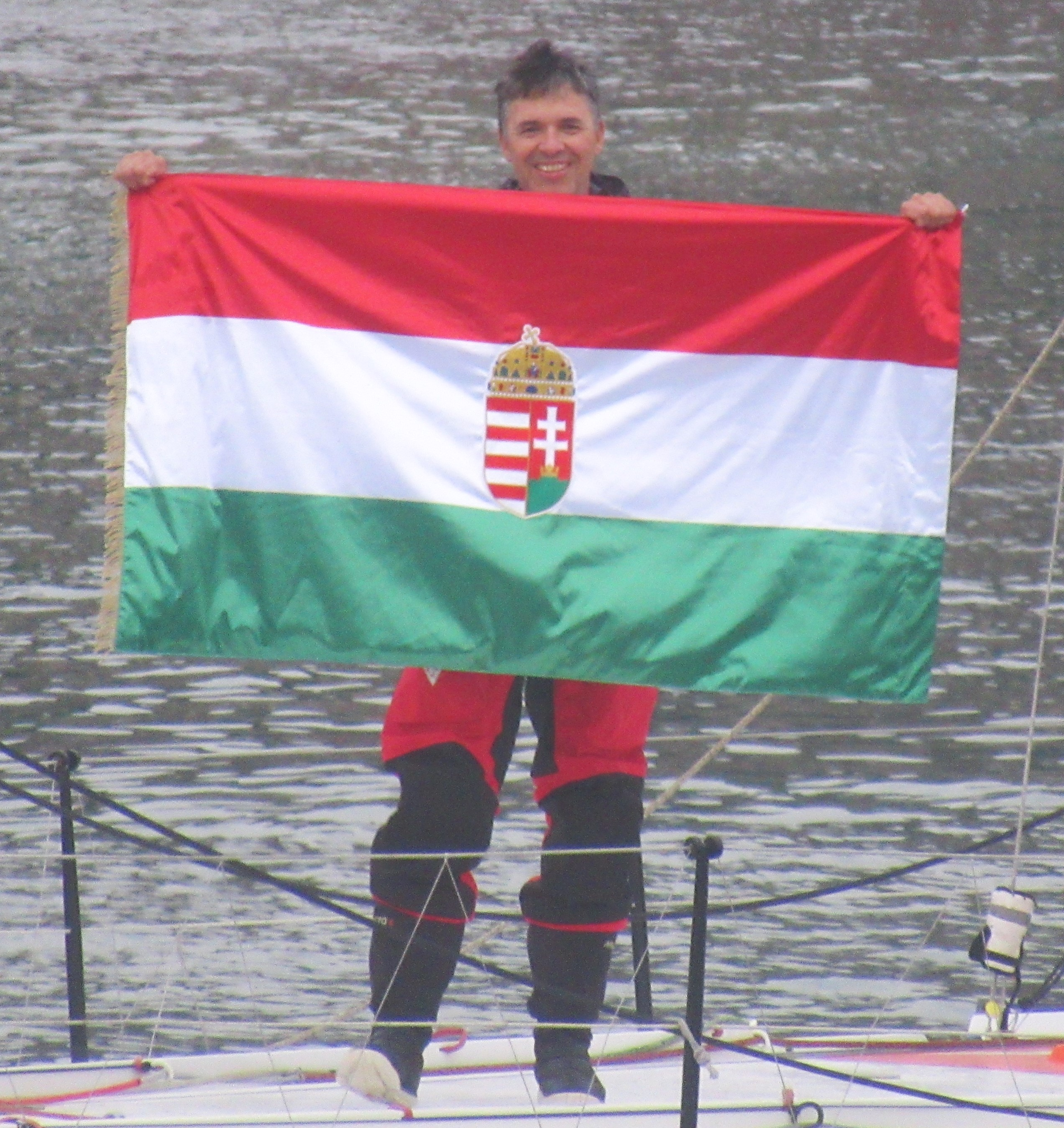
- At the start of the 2024-2025 Vendée Globe

Personal information
- Nationality: Hungarian
- Born: 20 August 1973 (age 52)
- Occupation: Offshore Sailor

Szabolcs Weöres (born 20 August 1973) is a Hungarian professional offshore sailor.

He was introduced to sailing by his family starting dinghy sailing at a young age in Optimist, Cadet, 420 class before moving on the Flying Dutchman and Soling. He then participated in the 32nd America’s Cup as a rigger for the South Africa Team Shosholoza.

== Oceanic/Offshore Sailing ==
| Pos | Year | Race | Class | Boat name | Crew | Time | Notes | Ref |
Round the world races
| DNF / 40 | 2024/25 | 2024-2025 Vendée Globe | IMOCA 60 | New Europe | | | | |
Transatlantic Races
| 26 / 40 | 2023 | Transat Jacques Vabre | IMOCA 60 | NEW EUROPE, HUN 23 | with Irina Gravheva (RUS) | 16d 06h 57m 50s | | |
