= IMOCA 60 Paprec 5 =

IMOCA 60 Racing Yacht

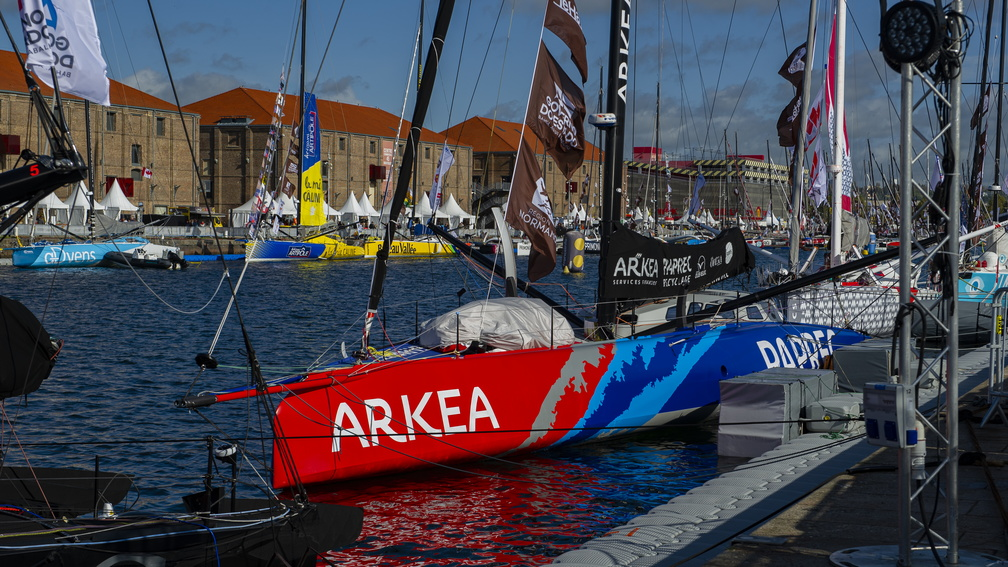

Development
- Designer: Juan Kouyoumdjian
- Year: 19 July 2019
- Builder: CDK Technologies

Racing
- Class association: IMOCA 60

The IMOCA 60 class yacht Arkéa Paprec, FRA 4 was designed by Juan Kouyoumdjian and launched on 19 July 2019 after being built CDK Technologies in Port La Forêtin, France

== Racing results ==
Pos	Year	Race	Class	Boat name	Skipper	Notes	Ref
Round the world races
DNF	2020	2020–2021 Vendée Globe	IMOCA 60	Arkea – Paprec	Sébastien Simon (FRA)		
Transatlantic Races
4 / 29	2021	Transat Jacques Vabre	IMOCA 60	Arkea – Paprec	Sébastien Simon (FRA); Yann Elies (FRA)	20d 17h 08m	
8 / 29	2019	Transat Jacques Vabre	IMOCA 60	Arkea – Paprec	Sébastien Simon (FRA); Vincent Riou (FRA)		
Other Races

== Timeline ==
During the 2020-2021 Vendée Globe on day 25 the starboard foil were damaged following collision with floating object forcing the boat to retire unaided to Cape Town.
