= IMOCA 60 Macif 2 =

Monohull sailing yacht

MACIF Santé Prévoyance
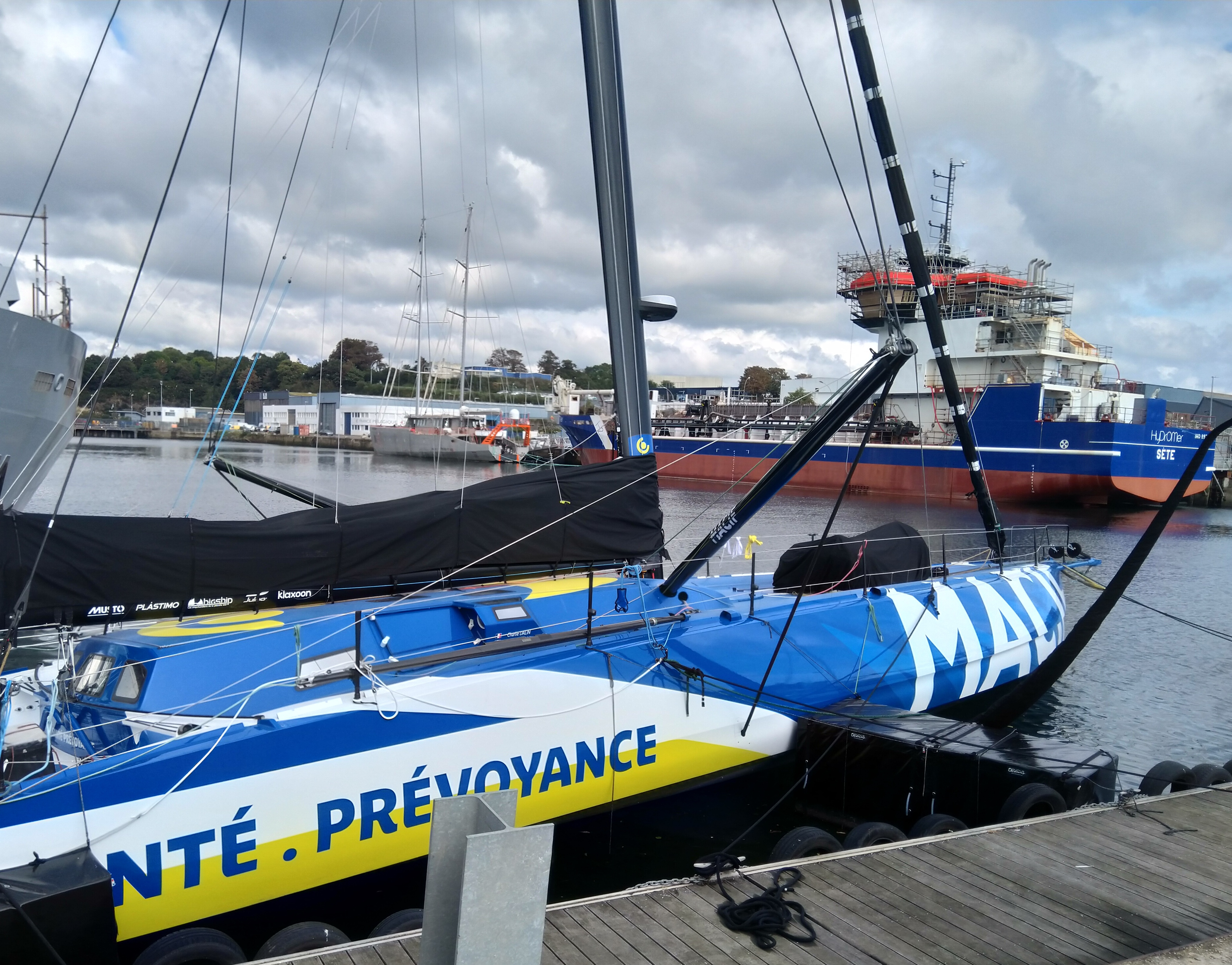

Development
- Designer: Guillaume Verdier
- Year: 2023-06-24
- Builder: CDK Technologies

Hull appendages
- General: two rudders, two foils
- Keel: canting keel

Racing
- Class association: IMOCA 60

MACIF Santé Prévoyance, is an IMOCA 60 monohull sailing yacht, designed by Guillaume Verdier, built by CDK Technologies and Mer Concept in France, and launched on 24 June 2023. It has been designed for the Vendée Globe 2024, a solo tour of the world. Its skipper was the French Charlie Dalin.

== Design ==
Compared to Apivia the boat is designed for better performance in the downwind conditions of the southern ocean. It was built by CDK Technologies (hull) and Mer Concept (assembly and outfitting), the sailing team and company of Francois Gabart which also manages the IMOCA campaign of Charlie Dalin.

== Racing results ==
Pos	Year	Race	Class	Boat name	(Co-)Skipper	Configuration, Time, Notes	Ref
Round the World
1 / 40	2024-25	2024–2025 Vendée Globe	IMOCA 60	MACIF Santé Prévoyance	Charlie Dalin (FRA)	64d 16h 22m 49s	
Transatlantic Races
DNF	2023	Transat Jaques Vabre	IMOCA 60	MACIF Santé Prévoyance	Charlie Dalin (FRA) with Pascal Bidegorry (FRA)		
