= Sam Goodchild =

British yachtsman

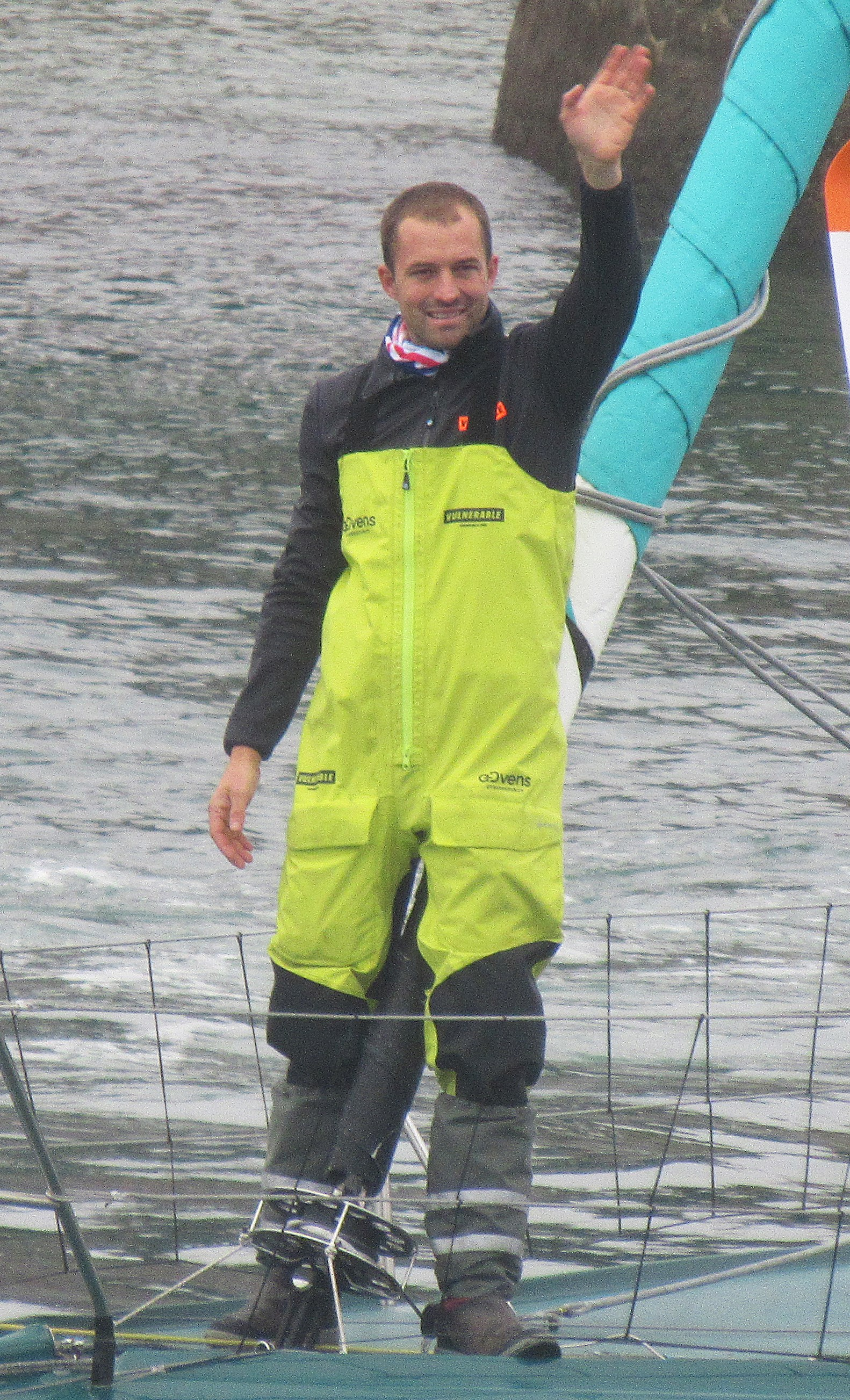
- Start of 2024 Vendee
- Born: 19 November 1989 (age 36); Bristol
- Occupation: Offshore Sailor

Sam Goodchild, is a professional British offshore sailor born in Bristol, England on 19 November 1989. He has competed in Vendee Globe, The Ocean Race and also been involvement with high-profile Multi 50 and Class 40 campaigns.

== Early life ==
He lived on a sailing boat for the first 11 years of his life so a life ocean racing wasn't a surprise. He was a member of the Artemis Offshore Academy an initiative to get young sailors into offshore sailing.

== Racing results ==
Pos.	Year	Event	Class	Boat	Time	Notes	Ref.
Round the world races
9 / 40	2025	2024-2025 Vendée Globe	IMOCA 60	Vunerable	76d 2h 1m 45s		
4 / 5	2023	The Ocean Race	IMOCA 60	Holcim-PRB			
4 / 7	2014	Volvo Ocean Race	Volvo Ocean 65	MAPFRE			
	2011	Volvo Ocean Race					
Transatlantic Races
DNF	2024	Transat New York Vendée	IMOCA 60	Vunerable		Dismasted	
3	2023	Retour à la Base (Transat B to B)	IMOCA 60	For the Planet	9d 07h 43m 21s		
3 / 32	2023	Transat Jacques Vabre	IMOCA 60	For the Planet	12d 01h 50m 32s	with Antoine Koch (FRA)	
3 /	2023	1000 race	IMOCA 60				
DNF	2022	Route du Rhum	Ocean 50			Withdrew due to injury	
3 / 7	2021	Transat Jacques Vabre	Ocean 50	Leyton	15d 17h 15m 43s	with Aymeric Chappellier (FRA)	
2 /	2019	Transat Jacques Vabre	Class 40	FRA 156 - Leyton	18d 00h 43m 11s	with Fabien Delahaye (FRA)	
DNF	2018	Route du Rhum	Class 40	GBR 137 - Narcos:Mexico		Dismasted	
7 / 20	2015	Transat Jacques Vabre	IMOCA 60	Comme un seul homme	19d 02h 15m 34s	with Antoine Koch (FRA)	
DNF	2013	Transat Jacques Vabre	Class 40	GBR 123 - Concise 8		with Ned Collier Wakefield (GBR)	
12 / 16	2012	Transat AG2R	Figaro 2	Artemis	22d 15h 59m 26s	with Nick Cherry	
DNF	2011	Transat Jacques Vabre	Class 40	GBR 93 - Concise 2		with Ned Collier Wakefield (GBR)	
Other Races
2 / 18	2024	Défi Azimut-Lorient Agglomération	IMOCA 60				
3 / 34	2023	Défi Azimut-Lorient Agglomération	IMOCA 60				
3 / 25	2023	Rolex Fastnet Race	IMOCA 60	For the Planet	02d 07:43:19		
1 /	2022	Dhream Cup	Ocean 50	Leyton	2d 22h 58m 08s		
1 /	2022	1000 miles des Sables	Ocean 50	Leyton	3d 2h 50m		
2 /	2022	Pro Sailing Tour	Ocean 50	Leyton	2d 15h 23m 14s	with Aymeric Chappellier (FRA) and Pierre Pennec (FRA)	
1 /	2021	Pro Sailing Tour	Ocean 50				
1 /	2020	Dhream Cup	Beneteau Figaro				
2 /	2020	Solo Maître Coq	Beneteau Figaro 3				
3 /	2019	Rolex Fastnet Race	Ultim				
2 /	2018	1000 miles des Sables	Class 40				
2 /	2014	Sevenstar Round Britain and Ireland Race	VOR65				
22 /	2014	Solitaire du Figaro	Beneteau Figaro 2				
11 /	2013	Solitaire du Figaro	Beneteau Figaro 2				
1 /	2013	RORC Caribbean 600	Class 40				
2 /	2013	Round Gotland Race					
1 /	2012	Normandy Channel Race					
24 /	2012	Solitaire du Figaro	Beneteau Figaro 2				
8 /	2012	Solo Figaro Massif Marine	Beneteau Figaro 2				
19 /	2011	Tour of Britany	Beneteau Figaro 2				
2 /	2011	Solo Basse Normandie	Beneteau Figaro 2				
34 /	2011	Solitaire du Figaro	Beneteau Figaro 2				
3 /	2011	La Transmanche	Beneteau Figaro 2				
16 /	2010	Round Britain and Ireland Race	Beneteau Figaro 2				
