= Clarisse Crémer =

French offshore sailor

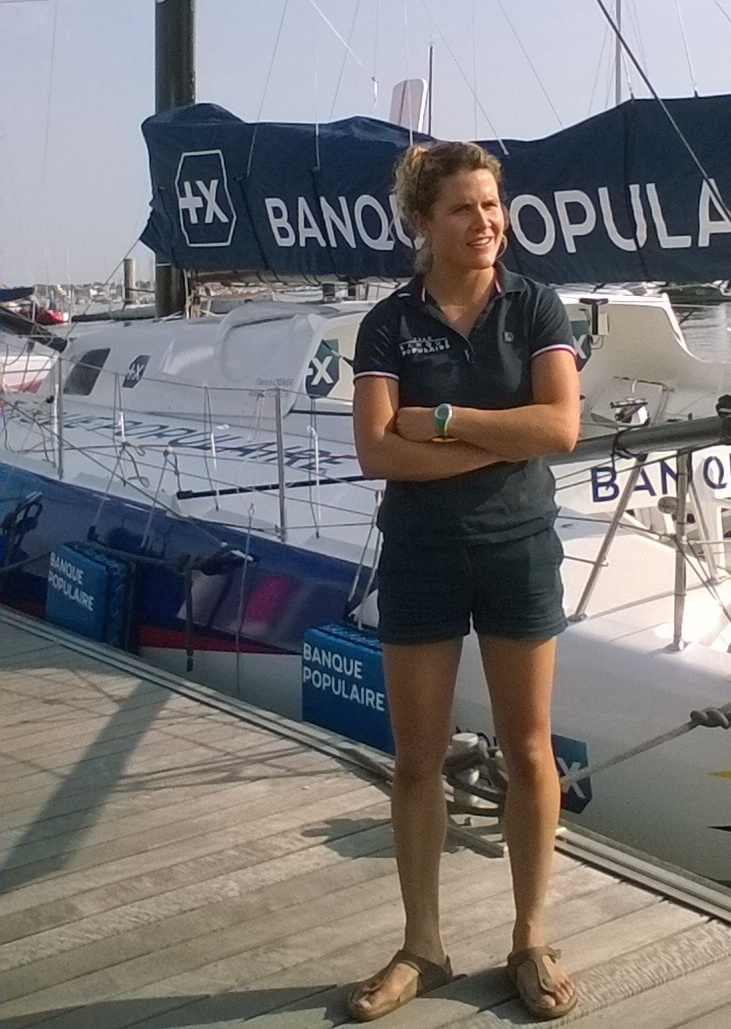

Personal information
- Nationality: French
- Born: 30 December 1989 (age 36) Paris, France

Sport

Sailing career
- Class(es): IMOCA 60; Beneteau Figaro
- Club: Club Nautique du Rohu

Clarisse Crémer (born 30 December 1989 in Paris) is a French professional sailor. She is an offshore sailor having competed extensively in the Figaro class before progressing to the IMOCA 60.

Crémer's 12th place finish in the 2020–2021 edition of the Vendée Globe, with a time of 87 days, 2 hours and 24 minutes, was the world record for a single-handed, non-stop, monohull circumnavigation by a woman until the record was beaten by Justine Mettraux in the 2024–2025 edition of the same race, with 76 days, 1 hour and 36 minutes.

She graduated from HEC Paris in 2013.

== Results highlights ==
Results History
Year	Pos	Race	Class	Boat name	Note	Ref.
2025	11	Vendée Globe	IMOCA 60	L’Occitane (2)		
2024	26	The Transat CIC	IMOCA 60	L’Occitane (2)		
2023	6	Fastnet Race	IMOCA 60	L’Occitane (2)	with Alan Roberts	
2021	12	Vendée Globe	IMOCA 60	Banque Populaire X		
2020	4	Défi Azimut				
2020	12	Vendée-Arctique-Les Sables d'Olonne	IMOCA 60	Banque Populaire X		
2019	6	Transat Jacques Vabre	IMOCA 60	Banque Populaire X	with Armel Le Cleac'h	
2019	6	Défi Azimut	IMOCA 60	Banque Populaire X	with Armel Le Cleac'h	
2019	3	Rolex Fastnet Race	IMOCA 60	Banque Populaire		
2019	29	Solitaire Urgo Le Figaro	Beneteau Figaro 3	EVERIAL		
2019	29	Solo Maître Coq	Beneteau Figaro 3	EVERIAL		
2018	18	Tour de France à la voile	Diam 24	HELVETIA PURPLE BY NORMANDY ELITE TEAM	Crewed	
2018	14	Transat AG2R	Beneteau Figaro 2	EVERIAL	with Tanguy Le Turquai	
2017	2	Championnat de France Espoir Course au Large				
2017	2	Transat 6.50				
2017	1	Mini Fastnet				
2016	7	Championnat de France Espoir				
