= IMOCA 60 DMG Mori =

IMOCA 60 Racing Yacht

Development
- Designer: VPLP Design, Gurit (United Kingdom)
- Year: 2 September 2019
- Builder: Multiplast

Racing
- Class association: IMOCA 60

The IMOCA 60 class yacht Spirit Of Yukoh V, JPN 11 also known as DMG Mori was designed by VPLP Design Office in partnership with Gurit for the structural design and built by Multiplast. The boat is a sistership to IMOCA 60 Charal but produced afterwards by Multiplast in France. The boat was launched on 2 September 2019.

== Racing results ==
Pos	Year	Race	Class	Boat name	Skipper	Notes	Ref
Round the world races
16 / 33	2020	2020–2021 Vendée Globe	IMOCA 60	DMG Mori - Global One	Kojiro Shiraishi (JPN)	94d 21h 32m 56s	
Transatlantic Races
Other Races
