= IMOCA 60 Apivia =

IMOCA 60 Racing Yacht

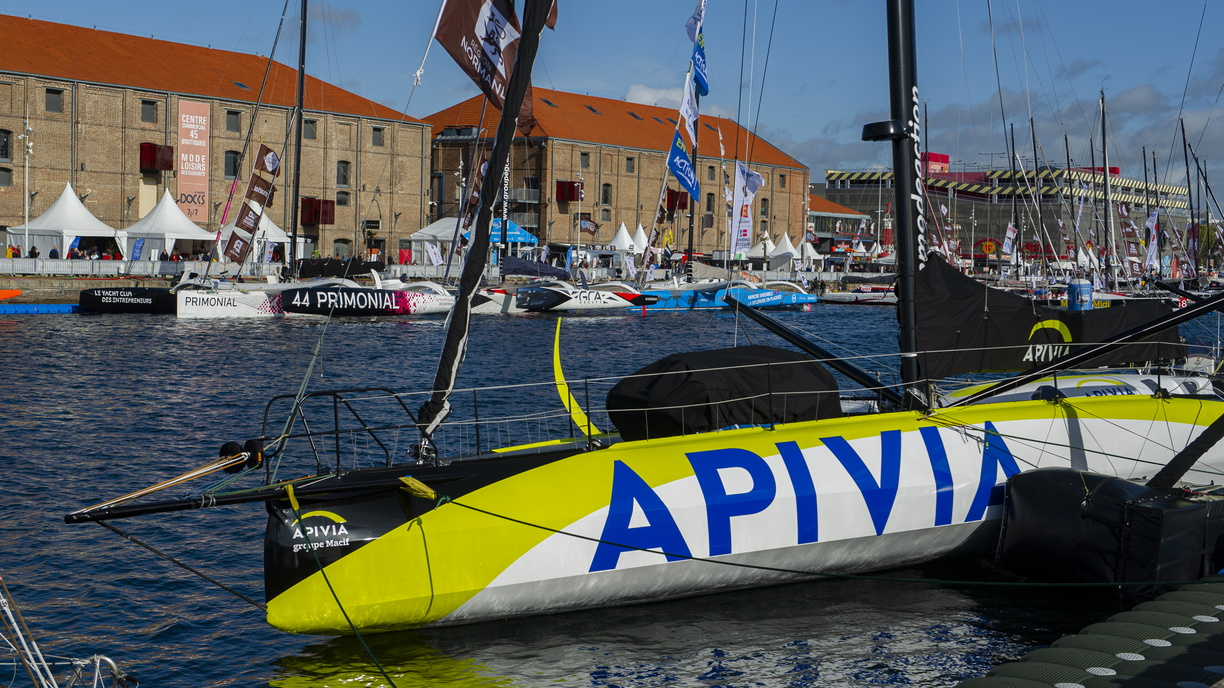

Development
- Designer: Guillaume Verdier
- Year: 5 August 2019
- Builder: CDK Technologies

Hull
- Hull weight: Carbon Sandwich

Hull appendages
- Keel: Canting Keel
- Rudder: Twin Rudders

Rig
- Rig type: Rotating Mast with Deck Spreaders

Racing
- Class association: IMOCA 60

The IMOCA 60 class yacht Apivia Mutuelle, FRA 79 was designed by Guillaume Verdier and launched in 2019 after being built CDK Technologies based in Lorient, France. The boat's initial skipper who is also a Naval architect Charlie Dalin had significant input as did MerConcept the company headed by François Gabart.

== Names and ownership ==
Apivia (2018-2023)

- Skipper: Carlie Dalin
- Sail no.: FRA 79

The boat got line honours in the 2020-2021 Vendée Globe but was ranked second following redress given to fellow competitors.

Banque Populaire XII

In November 2021 the team formally announced the purchase of the boat following Apivia completing the 2021 Route du Rhum, with the team starting the handover by helping to return the boat to France.

Banque Populaire chose to end its sponsorship, with Clarisse Crémer citing her young child as one of the reason the public backlash led to the sponsor withdrawing and Crémer quickly found a new sponsor with the support of Alex Thompson Racing.

L'OCCITANE en Provence (2) (since 2023)

- Skipper: Clarisse Crémer
- Sail no.: FRA 15

== Racing results ==
| Pos | Year | Race | Class | Boat name | Skipper | Notes | Ref |
Round the world races
| 11 / 40 | 2025 | 2024–2025 Vendée Globe | IMOCA 60 | L'Occitane en Provence (2) | Clarisse Crémer (FRA) | | |
| 2 / 33 | 2020 | 2020–2021 Vendée Globe | IMOCA 60 | Apivia | Charlie Dalin (FRA) | 80d 06h 15m 47s | |
Transatlantic Races
| 9 / 40 | 2023 | 2023 Transat Jacques Vabre | IMOCA 60 | L'Occitane en Provence (2) | Clarisse Cremer (FRA); Alan Roberts (GBR) | 13d 01h 50m 00s | |
| 2 | 2022 | Route du Rhum | IMOCA 60 | Apivia | Charlie Dalin (FRA) | 11d 19h 38m 11s | |
| 2 / 22 | 2021 | 2021 Transat Jacques Vabre | IMOCA 60 | Apivia | Charlie Dalin (FRA); Paul Meilhat (FRA) | 18d 21h 33m 31s | |
| 1 / 29 | 2019 | Transat Jacques Vabre | IMOCA 60 | Apivia | Charlie Dalin (FRA); Yann Elies (FRA) | 13d 12h 08m | |
Other Races
| 1 | 2022 | Vendée Arctique | IMOCA 60 | Apivia | Charlie Dalin (FRA) | | |
