= Beneteau Figaro II =

Sailboat class

Beneteau Figaro 2
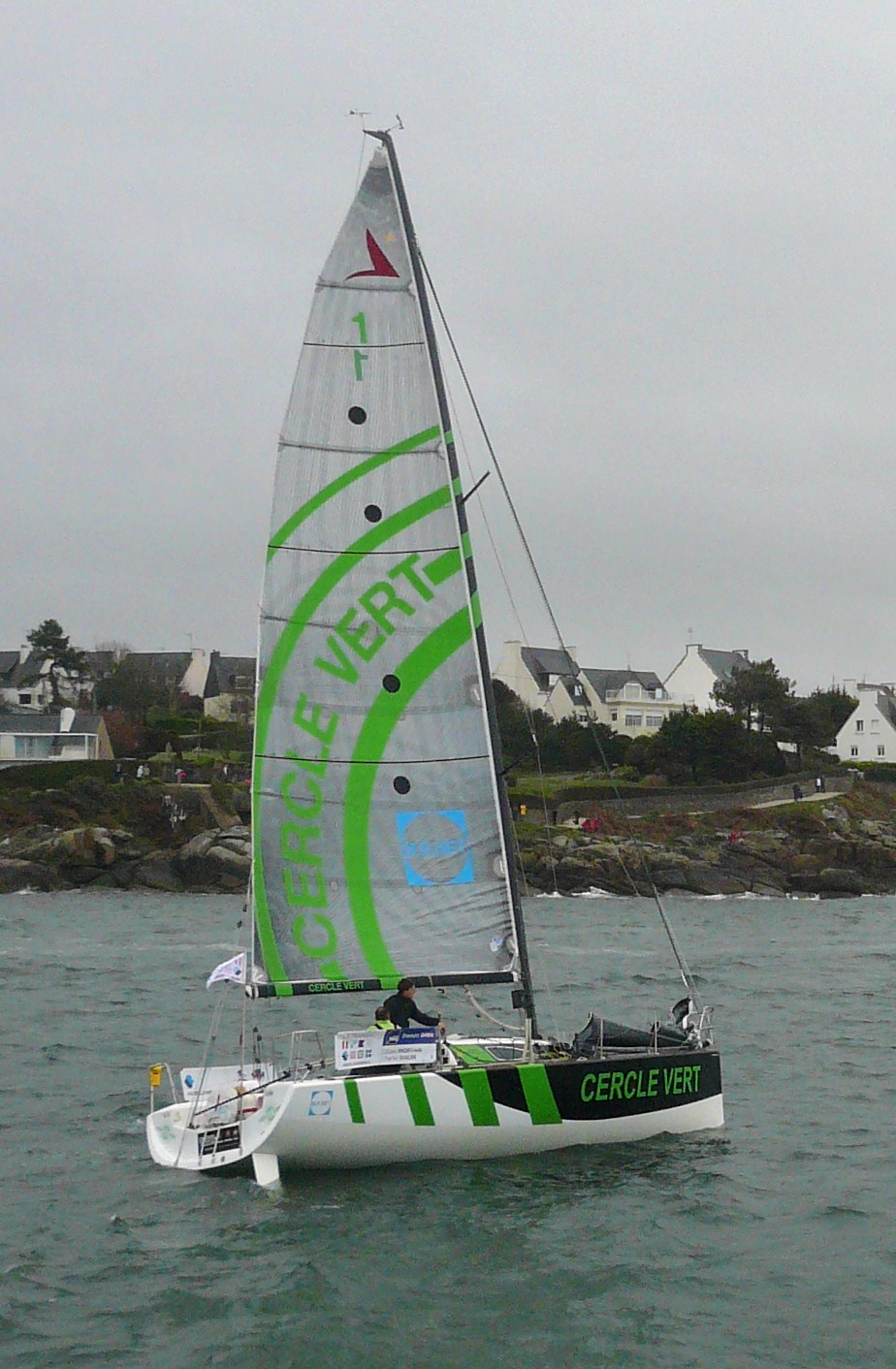

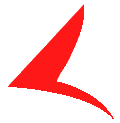

Development
- Designer: Marc Lombard
- Location: France
- Year: 2003
- No. built: 96
- Builder: Beneteau
- Role: One design racer
- Name: Beneteau Figaro 2

Boat
- Crew: One
- Displacement: 6,724 lb (3,050 kg) Lightship; 3,600 kg (7,900 lb) Loaded
- Draft: 2.2 m (7.2 ft)
- Air draft: 15.68 m (51.4 ft)

Hull
- Type: monohull
- Construction: glassfibre
- LOA: 10.15 m (33.3 ft)
- LOH: 10.11 m (33.2 ft)
- LWL: 9.8 m (32 ft)
- Beam: 3.43 m (11.3 ft)
- Engine: Volvo MD2020 19 hp (14 kW) diesel engine

Hull appendages
- Keel: Fin keel with a swept, weighted bulb
- Ballast: 1,110 kg (2,447 lb)
- Rudder: Dual spade-type rudders

Rig
- Rig type: Bermuda rig
- I foretriangle height: 13.03 m (42.7 ft)
- J foretriangle base: 3.79 m (12.4 ft)
- P mainsail luff: 13 m (43 ft)
- E mainsail foot: 4.7 m (15 ft)
- Mast height: 14.2 m (47 ft)

Sails
- Sailplan: 7/8 Fractional rigged sloop
- Mainsail area: 409 sq ft (38.0 m^{2})
- Jib/genoa area: 35.6 m^{2} (383 sq ft)
- Spinnaker area: 915 sq ft (85.0 m^{2})
- Gennaker area: 28.0 m^{2} (301 sq ft)
- Upwind sail area: 732 sq ft (68.0 m^{2})
- Downwind sail area: 1,324 sq ft (123.0 m^{2})

Racing
- PHRF: 57

The Beneteau Figaro II is a one design sailboat designed for the Solitaire du Figaro race. It was built by Beneteau in France from 2003 to 2018 with 96 boats completed over the 15 year production run.

The boat replaced the Beneteau Figaro in the Solitaire du Figaro and was in turn replaced by the Beneteau Figaro 3 in 2016.

== Design ==
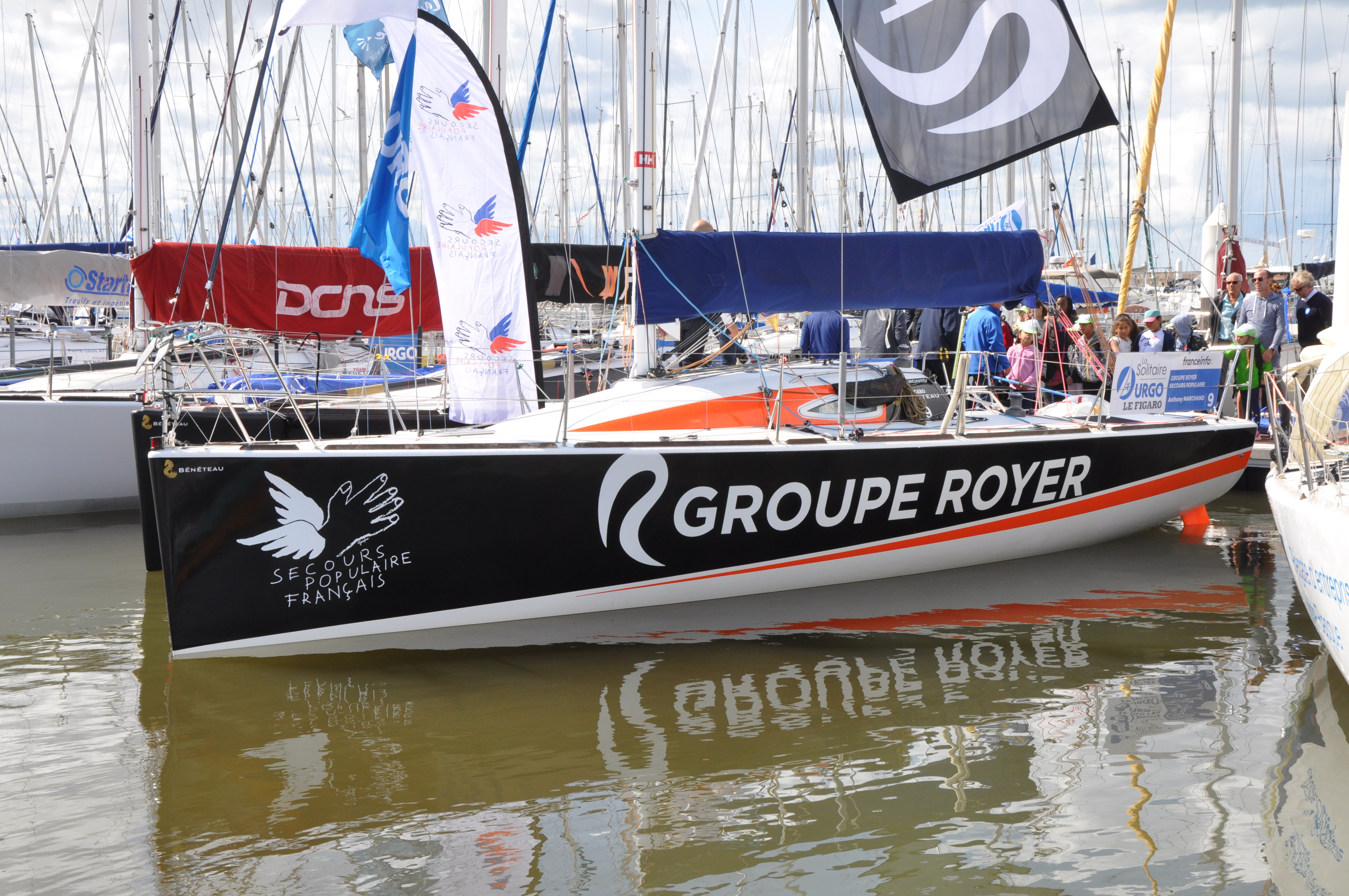
Figaro 2

Designed by Marc Lombard, it is built of glassfibre, carbon fibre and Airex foam. The hull has a plumb stem, an open reverse transom, twin internally mounted spade-type rudders controlled by a tiller and a fixed fin keel with a swept, weighted bulb. It displaces 6,724 lb (3,050 kg) and carries 2,425 lb (1,100 kg) of ballast. The ballast consists of lead in the keel and two lateral hull water ballast tanks, which each hold 58.1 U.S. gallons (220 L; 48.4 imp gal). The design has a hull speed of 7.61 kn (14.09 km/h) and a PHRF handicap of 57.

It has a 7/8 fractional sloop rig, with a deck-stepped mast, two sets of 20° swept spreaders and a carbon fibre mast with an aluminium boom with stainless steel rod standing rigging. For sailing downwind the design may be equipped with a symmetrical spinnaker of 915 sq ft (85.0 m^{2}).

The boat has a draft of 6.50 ft (1.98 m) with the standard keel.

The boat is fitted with a Volvo MD2020 diesel engine of 20 hp (15 kW).

The design has sleeping accommodation for four people in a minimalist interior.

In a 2016 interview, the designer explained the boat's philosophy, "that's pretty simple: We had to find the balance between the task of meeting the tight selling price of 100.000 Euros ex VAT and at the same time the obligation to offer the best technology and innovation we could afford in that budget. You know, for an A category CE-boat at this time the minimum weight possible was three tons. This also meant we´ve had to go for a relatively high draught, had the minimum weight and a certain stability requirement with full ballast and a minimum length of 10 meters to fit the A category. We also wanted lateral ballast, because a canting keel was at that time far out of target budget – yet high stability was needed for single- or double-handed sailing. For that same reason we have not been able to convince the people at Beneteau to go for a bowsprit with high roach main, asymmetrical spinnaker. In the end, we nevertheless kept innovation factor high: The Figaro II features a double rudder for large directional stability and controllability single-handed, it's still a very light construction. We can add stability with the ballast system and have a carbon mast for speed – to sum it up, it´s a strong one design-rule for having a boat for a good, exciting competition."

== Reception ==
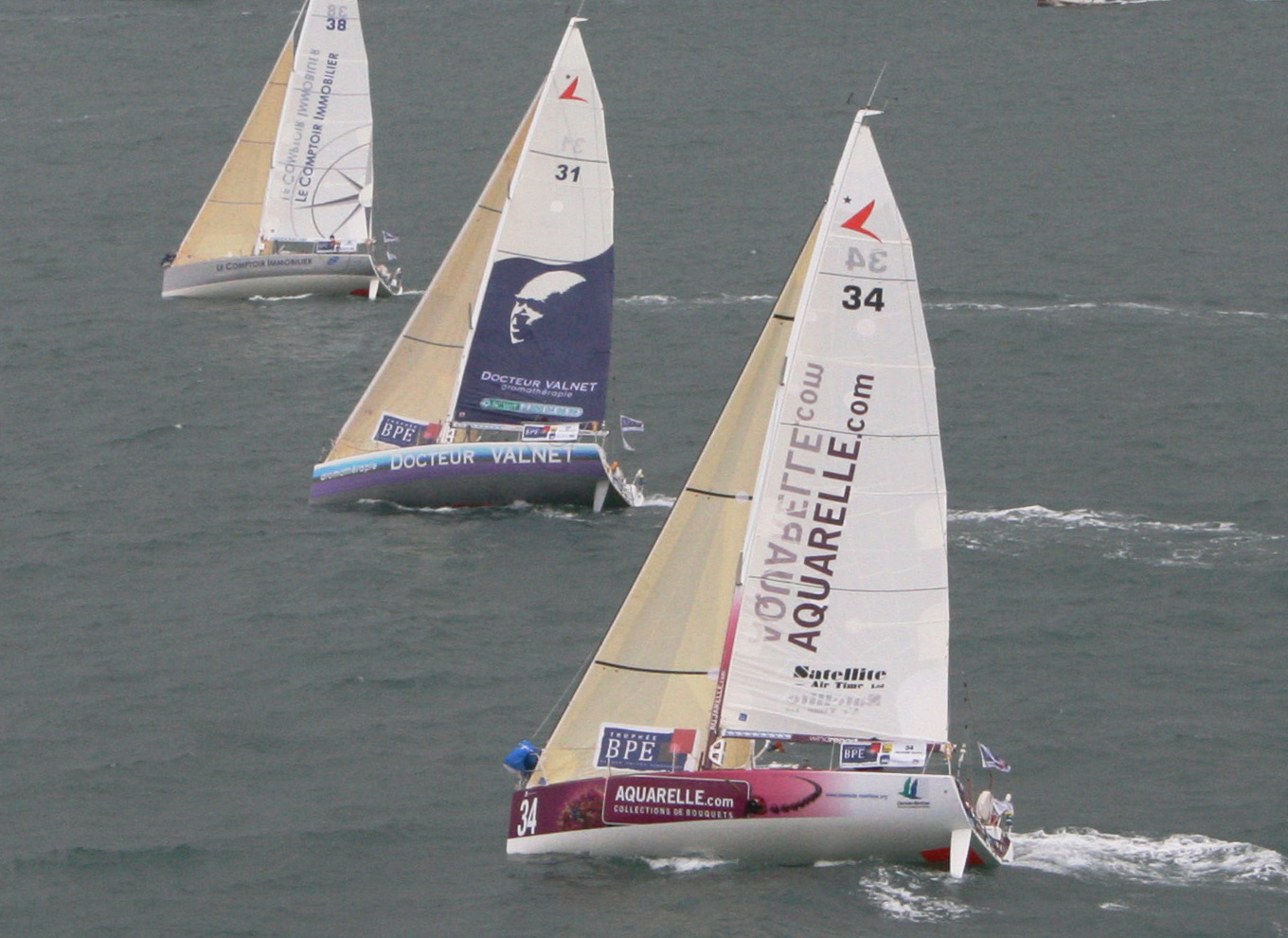
Figaro 2s racing for the BPE Trophy

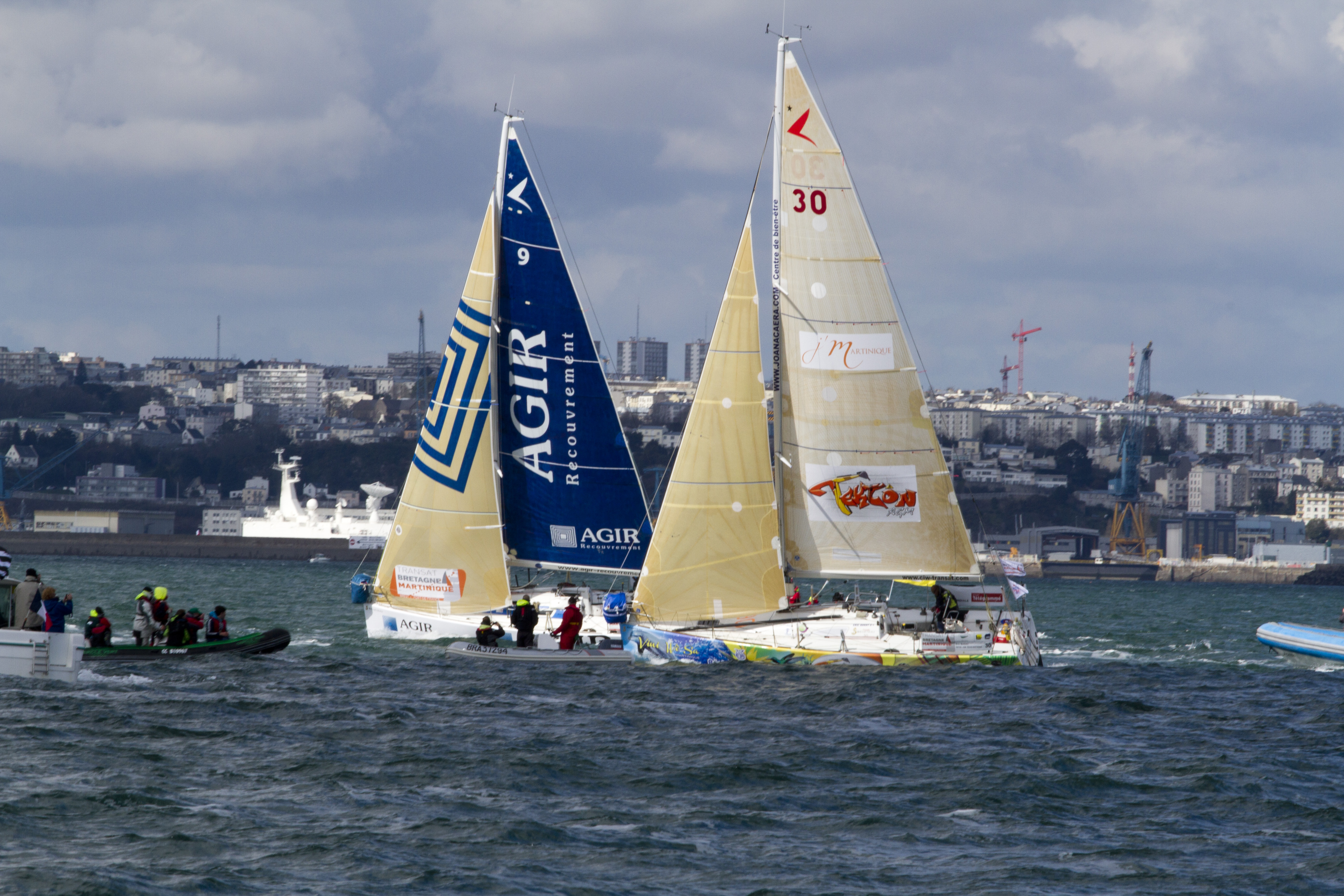
Figaro 2s racing in the Brest-Martinique race

In a 2013 review for boats.com, Rupert Holmes named the design one of the best Beneteau yachts, stating, "the Figaro ll, however, was conceived in 2003 as an out-and-out racer for the high profile annual 1,500 mile single-handed Solitaire du Figaro race. It is now seen as an iconic, especially in France, where the race has a strong public following and successful skippers are household names. The boat combines light weight with plenty of power and twin rudders for downwind control at high speeds – skippers will continue to sail with spinnakers in near gale-force conditions, often achieving speeds of more than 20 knots."
