= Manuel Cousin =

French offshore sailor

Personal information
- Nationality: French
- Born: 10 July 1967 (age 58)

Sailing career
- Sport: Sailing
- Class: IMOCA 60

Manuel Cousin is a French professional sailor born on 10 July 1967 in Rouen who competed in the 2020–2021 Vendée Globe. Sailing IMOCA 60 named Groupe Sétin, he completed the race in 103 days 18 hours 15 minutes. He started his professional sailing career late, having worked for Toyota forklifts as an accounts manager of which Groupe Sétin were one of the suppliers. He has a Diploma in Robotics Industrial Maintenance.
