= IMOCA 60 =

Sailing yacht class

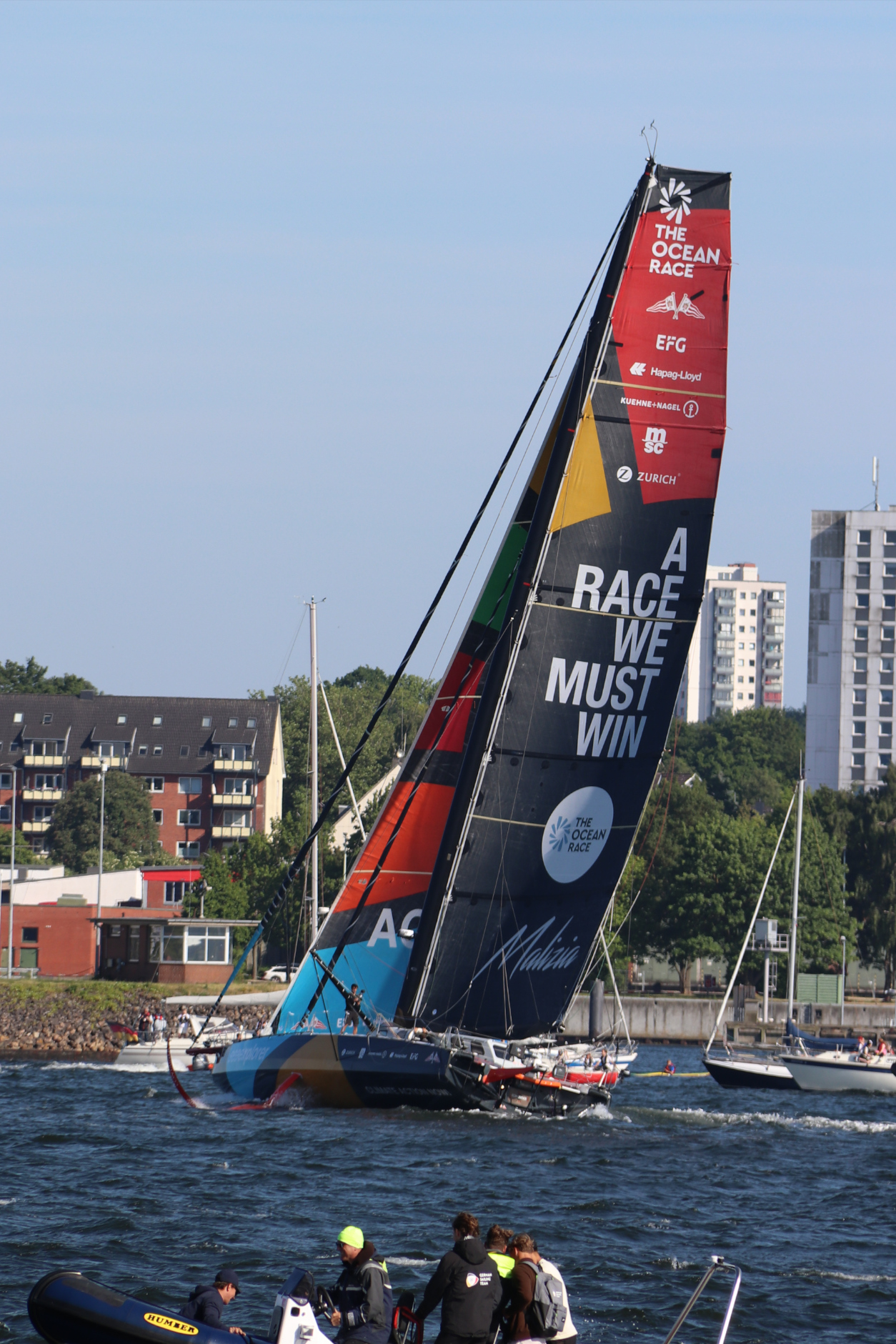

Development
- Designer: Various including Farr Yacht Design; Finot-Conq; Joubert-Nivelt; Juan Kouyoumdjian; Marc Lombard; Owen-Clarke; Verdier-VPLP
- Year: 1991 Onwards
- No. built: +100
- Design: Open
- Builders: Various including Cookson Boats; CDK Technologies; Green Marine; JMV Industries; Marc Pinta; Multiplast; Persico

Boat
- Crew: Typically 1 or 2

Hull
- Type: Monohull
- Construction: Typically Carbon Fibre Composite
- LOH: 18 m (60 ft)

Hull appendages
- Keel: Canting

Rig
- Rig type: Sloop

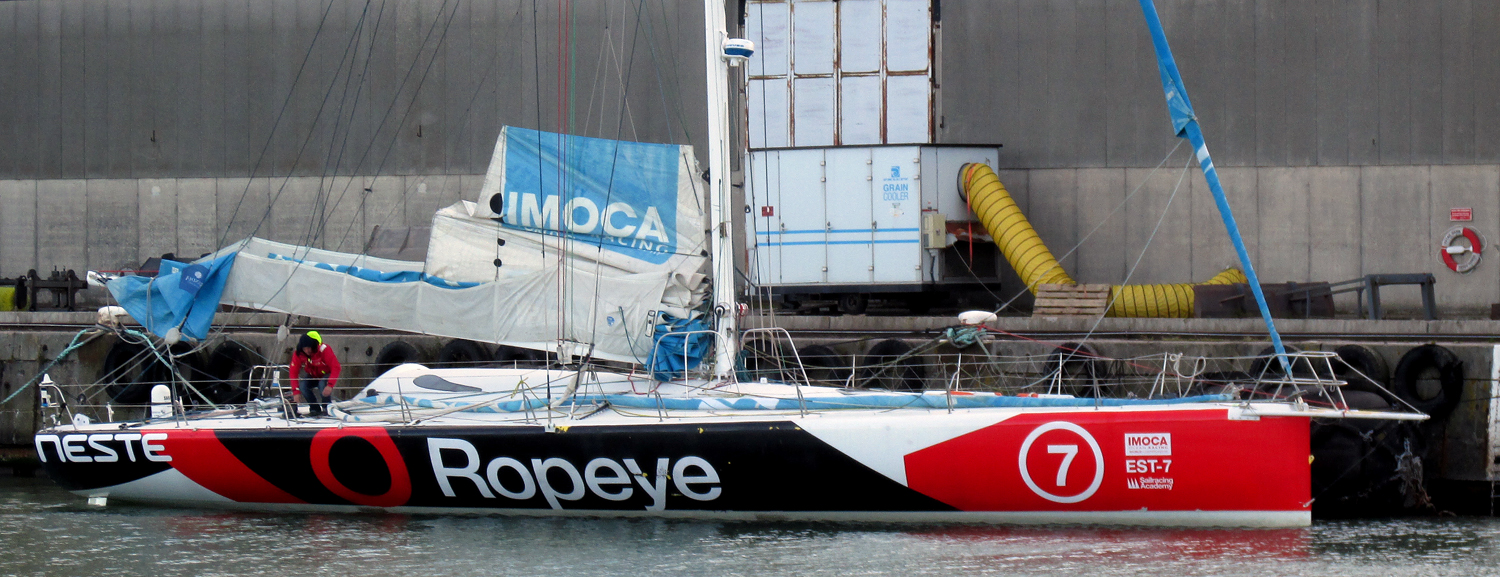
Ropeye IMOCA 60, in the port of Ystad 2017.

The IMOCA ("Open 60") is a 60 ft (18.3 m) development class monohull sailing yacht governed by the International Monohull Open Class Association (IMOCA). The class pinnacle event are single or two person ocean races, such as the Route du Rhum and the Vendée Globe and this has been intimately linked to design development within the class. The class is recognised by World Sailing.

== Class description ==
The class is of "open" design: the boat is measurement controlled, and designers have freedom within the rules. Several parts including the mast, boom and the canting keel ram and fin are one design for safety reasons.

After several severe incidents in the early years of the class a self righting capability was introduced. Each boat must be able to self-right itself at any time. Every boat must prove this capability in a 90 degree or 180 degree test.

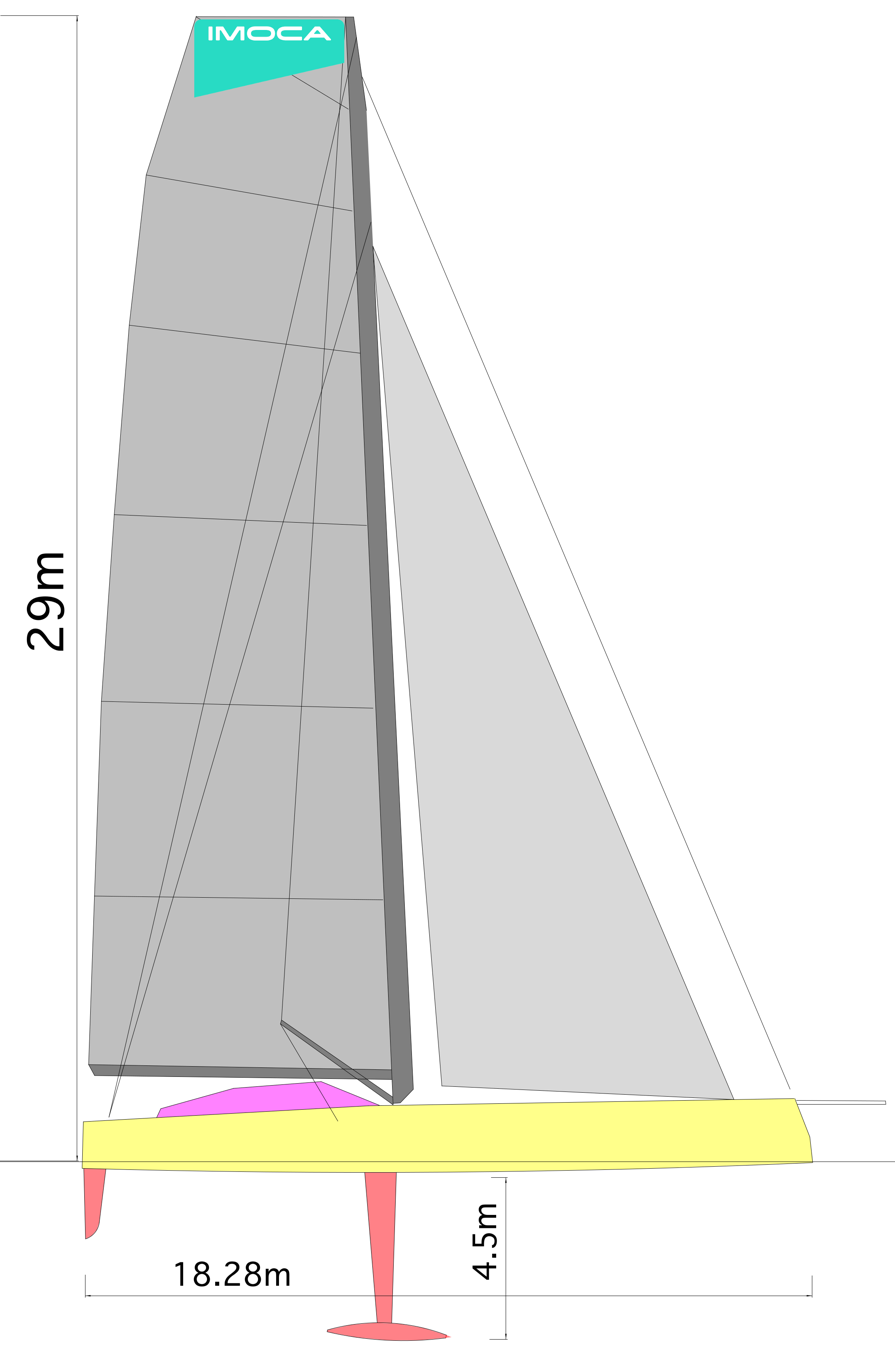

=== Dimensions ===
Design restrictions include the hull length to be between 59 and 60 feet (18 m) and maximum draft of 4.5 metres (15 ft). The length including the bowsprit may not exceed 20.12 m. The max beam is 5,85 m. A maximum of four ballast tanks is allowed. Each of them has a limit in size.

=== Hull ===
The IMOCAs have typically a very wide hull compared to yachts designed for coastal races. This is supposed to give more stability in wilder sea states. The mid-2000s boats had mostly a very streamlined hull optimized to create very little turbulence, thus reducing resistance.

The introduction of foils changed the expected stresses on the hull. The points where the foils are attached moved the contact point between hull and waves further back. As a result, older boats retrofitted with foils often needed a strengthened hull. To increase performance in heavy seas scow-bows were introduced in the class. First introduced on L'Occitane these are supposed to reduce nose diving, which reduces the average speed significantly.

=== Cockpit ===
The first IMOCAs had a fully open cockpit where winches and ship's wheel(s) were located. With progressing development the work area got more and more protected by a roof open to the back, sometimes also called cave. The ship's wheels were mostly replaced by different versions of tillers as autopilots took over more of the steering. In boats of the 2020 generation the first fully enclosed cockpits appeared, allowing the skippers to stay dry most of the time.

=== Rigging ===
The mast of IMOCA, which is held in place by several stays is able to turn with the main sail, typically of about 180 m^{2}. The area of the main sail can be adjusted by lowering it towards the boom, its bottom attachment. It is fully battened. To improve the performance of the mainsail the gap between boom and hull/cockpit might be closed. Charal 2 implemented this first.

Forward of the mast, most boats have at least four forestays which can carry headsails. Three of these are usually attached to the deck and, as well as bracing the mast, can carry jibs. The fourth stay runs from the mast to the tip of the bowsprit and is used for gennaker or spinnaker sails. The number of headsails that can be taken into a race is limited by most race regulations.

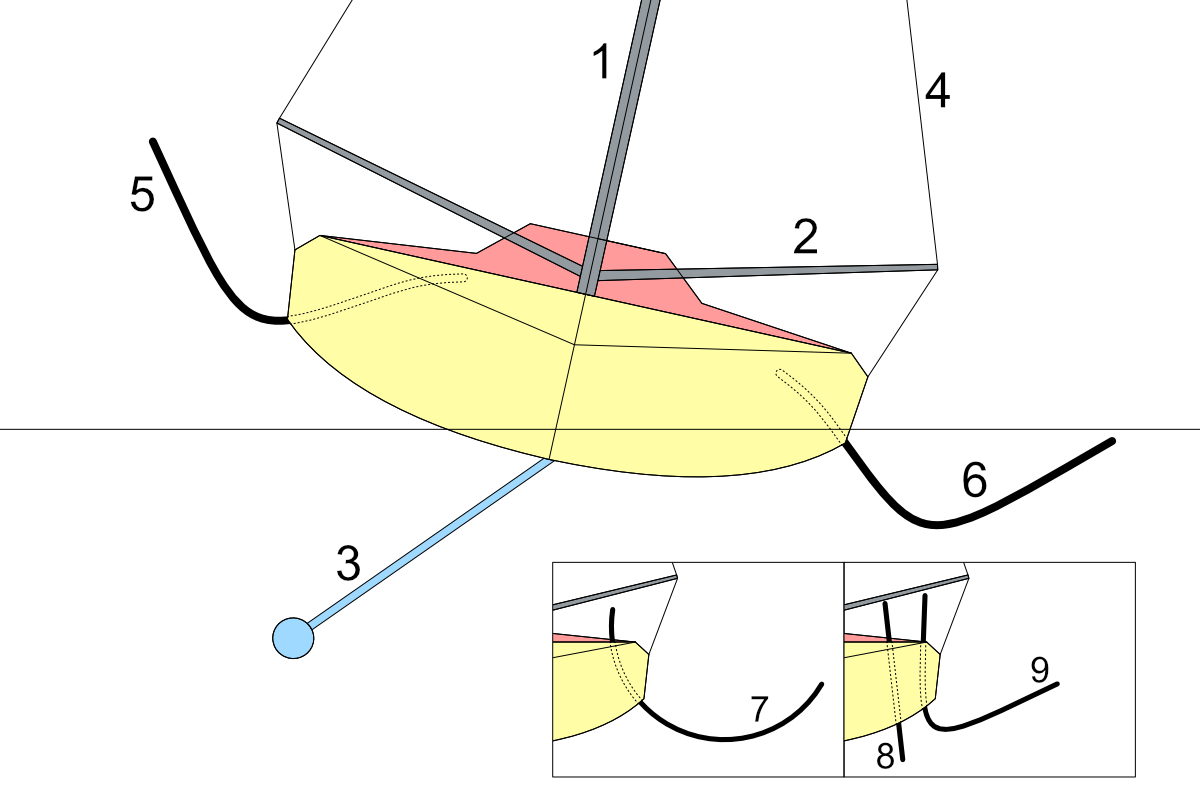
1: main mast; 2: spreaders; 3: keel; 4: shrouds; 5: S-foil retracted; 6: S-foil extended; 7: C-foil (like Hugo Boss 7); 8: daggerboard; 9: C-foil (like Corum)

=== Appendages ===
Two rudders and one keel are mandatory. The keel is allowed to be tilted up to 38 degrees to either side. The rudders are not allowed to have any appendages that provide lift. Certain rudder designs such as the inverted V-shape on Charal 2 are able to provide some lift.

Two other appendages are allowed, typically either hydrofoils or daggerboards. Both types of appendage are typically able to be (partially) retracted. The rake/angle of the foils can be changed up to 5 degrees.

=== Autopilot ===
Each boat is equipped with an autopilot that keeps the boat going constantly to allow the skipper to turn to other tasks. The autopilot uses sensors that allow it to take into account sudden variations in apparent wind, speed, load on the foils and sails. Automated obstacle avoidance, whether it is the other ships detected by radar, AIS, or obstacles detected by the OSCAR system, which detects unknown floating objects. The data provided by the sensors allow the autopilot to steer the boat with the best wind angle and to avoid boat-breaking loads.

=== Rule changes under discussion ===
Evolution of autopilot: Hydraulic control of the adjustment of the sails and the foils. For reasons of cost and maturity of technology, this track is still excluded from all the rules. However, on flying sailboats that are increasingly akin to aircraft in mechanical terms, it seems inevitable that the automated servo-controls already developed and generalized in aviation will be adapted to the world of foiling boats.

T-Rudders: Elevators in the back of the boat have been discussed. The IMOCA general assembly has voted against the introduction, most recently in October 2023.

Mast: Due to the increasing loads to the mast due to foiling, changes to the one design mast are under discussion.

== History ==
The first major sailing competition in which the Open 60s appeared was the 1986 BOC Challenge. The first boats were only limited by their length, up to 15 tons heavy and mostly constructed from aluminium.

Major milestones in the history of the IMOCA 60s:

- First Vendée Globe (1989–1990)
- 1991: International Monohull Open Class Association founded
- 1998: Introduction of canting keel
- 2007: first Barcelona World Race
- 2013: one design mast and keel fin. Introduction of foils.
- 2018: creation of IMOCA Globe series
- 2023: First edition of The Ocean Race with IMOCA 60 participation.

== Events ==
IMOCA 60 races
Name	Location	Sailing mode	Race mode	Length (Note: The length can vary widely between editions of the races) (nautical miles)	Limited to IMOCA 60	Cycle	First (Note: Not necessarily with IMOCA 60 participation from start)	Last	Notes
Vendée Globe	around the world	single handed	non-stop	24 000	yes	4 years	1989	ongoing	
The Ocean Race	around the world	crewed	staged	varying	no	4 years	1973	ongoing	
Transat Jacques Vabre	transatlantic	double handed	non-stop	varying	no	2 years	1993	ongoing	
Route du Rhum		single handed	non-stop	3 542	no	4 years	1978	ongoing	
The Transat (Note: Originally Single-Handed Trans-Atlantic Race)	transatlantic	single handed	non-stop	3 750	no	4 years	1960	ongoing	
Retour à la base (Note: Formerly Transat B to B)	transatlantic	single handed	non-stop	3 500	yes	irregular	2007	ongoing	
Transat New York Vendée	transatlantic	single handed	non-stop	3 600	yes	irregular	2016	ongoing	
Rolex Fastnet Race	European offshore	various	non-stop	605	no	2 years	1925	ongoing	
Vendée Arctic	European offshore	single handed	non-stop	1 200	yes	irregular	2020	ongoing	
The Ocean Race Europe	European offshore	crewed	staged	varying	no	tbd	2021	ongoing	
Guyader Bermudes 1000 Race	European offshore	various	non-stop	1 200	yes	irregular	2019	ongoing	
Le Défi Azimut	European offshore	various	non-stop	500	yes	yearly	2011	ongoing	
Trans-Tasman	Australia to New Zealand	crewed	non-stop	1,200	no	annual	2026	ongoing	
Major former races									
Barcelona World Race	around the world	double handed	non-stop		yes	4 years	2007	2015	
Velux 5 Oceans Race	around the world	single handed	staged	varying	no	4 years	1982	2011	
Calais Round Britain Race	European offshore	various	non-stop		yes	2 years	2003	2007	

Other races with IMOCA 60 participation:

- Small races that where discontinued: ArMen Race, Grand Prix Guyader,
- One-time races: Monaco Globe Series, Drheam-Cup 700, Europa Warm’Up, Istanbul Europa Race, Bermudes 1000 Race - Douarnenez / Cascais, Record SNSM, Transat St Barth - Port La Forêt
- Races with little or occasional IMOCA 60 participation, mostly outside of the official IMOCA 60 race calendar: Round Britain & Ireland Race, Giraglia Rolex Race, Sydney to Hobart Yacht Race, Transat Québec - Saint-Malo, Newport Bermuda Race

== See also ==
- Open 50
- International Monohull Open Class Association (IMOCA)
- Vendée Globe
