= IMOCA 60 Corum =

IMOCA 60 Racing Yacht

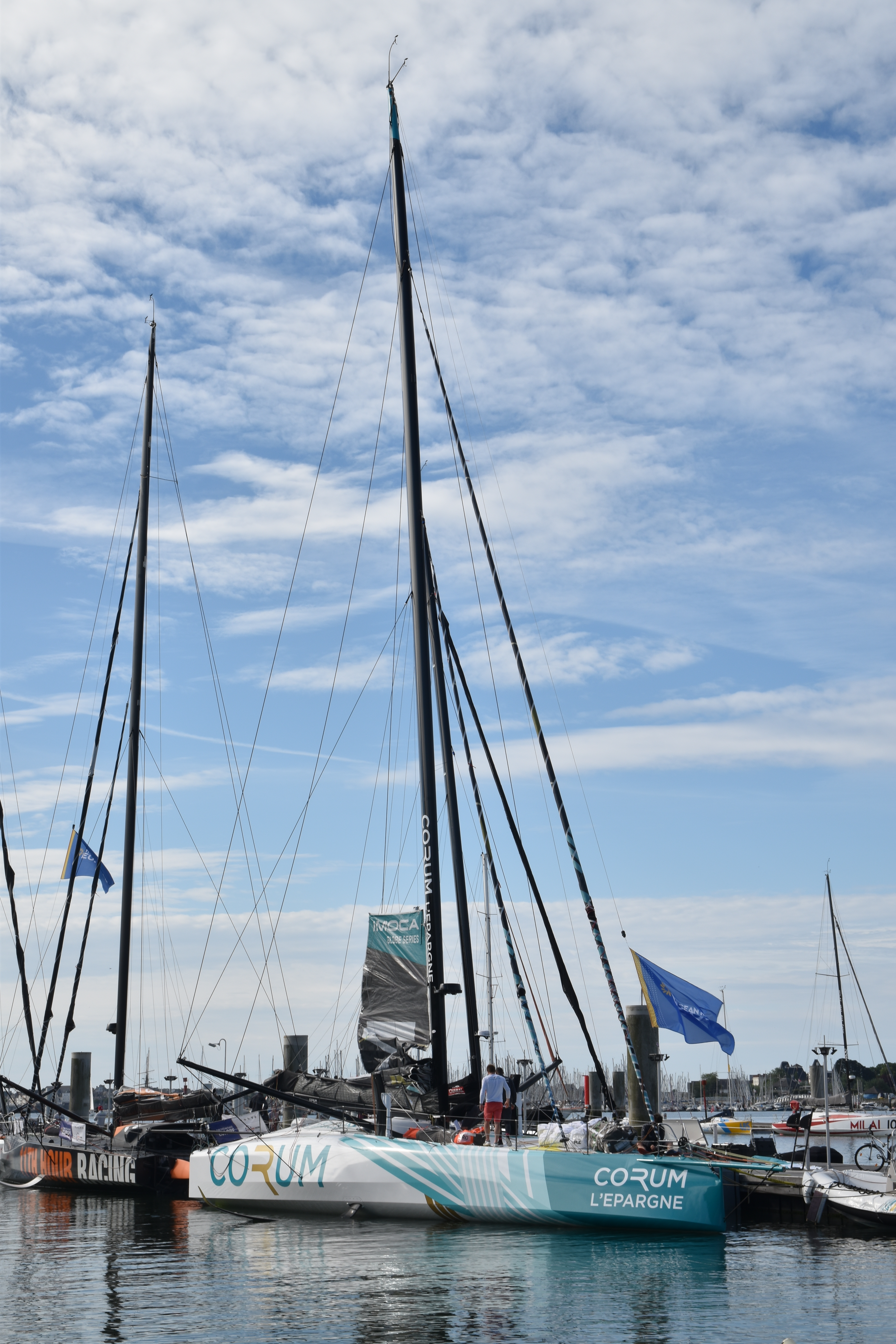

Development
- Designer: Juan Kouyoumdjian
- Year: 2020
- Builder: CDK Technologies

Racing
- Class association: IMOCA 60

The IMOCA 60 class yacht Corum L'Epargne, FRA 9 was designed by Juan Kouyoumdjian and launched on 5 May 2020 after being built CDK Technologies based in Lorient, France.

Following the second dismasting of his boat during the Defi Azimut in October 2023, the first one being in the 2020-2021 Vendée Globe, Nicolas Troussel (FRA) lost the support of his sponsor Corum and with that the boat Corum l'Epargne.

== Racing results ==
Pos	Year	Race	Class	Boat name	Skipper	Notes	Ref
Round the world races
DNF / 33	2020	2020–2021 Vendée Globe	IMOCA 60	Corum L'Epargne, FRA 9	Nicolas Troussel (FRA)	Day 8: Dismasted, diverted unaided to Cape Verde Islands	
Transatlantic Races
8 / 22	2021	Transat Jacques Vabre	IMOCA 60	Corum L'Epargne, FRA 9	Nicolas Troussel (FRA); Sébastien Josse (FRA)	20d 21h 15m	
Other Races
