= IMOCA 60 Paprec 4 =

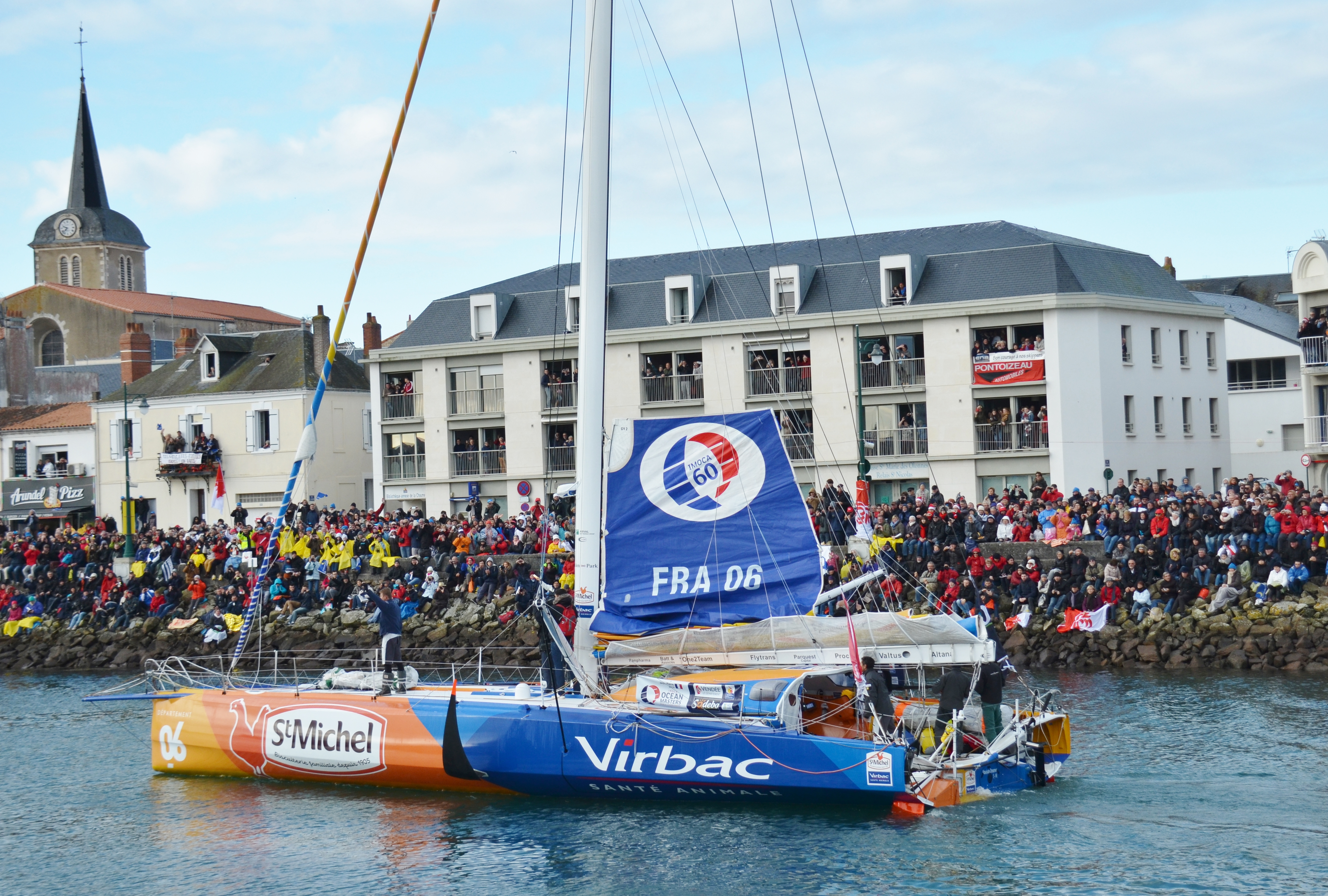

Development
- Designer: VPLP Design, Guillaume Verdier Design Office
- Year: 11 September 2015
- Builder: Multiplast

Racing
- Class association: IMOCA 60

The IMOCA 60 class yacht Saint Michel - Virbac, FRA 06, was designed by VPLP design and Guillaume Verdier and launched on 11 September 2015 after being built by Multiplast in Vannes, France.

In preparation for the 2024 Vendee Globe, the bow section of the yacht was rebuilt to a more efficient shape and it received new foils.

== Names and ownership ==
The boat was developed under the name Absolute Dreamer 5, FRA 06.

St-Michel-Virbac (2015-2018)

- Skipper: Jean-Pierre Dick

Ucar-St-Michel (2018-2019)

- Skipper: Yann Eliès

Prysmian Group (since 2019)

- Skipper: Giancarlo Pedote
- Sail No.: ITA 34

== Racing results ==
Pos	Year	Race	Class	Boat name	Skipper	Notes	Ref
Round the world races
8 / 33	2021	2020–2021 Vendée Globe	IMOCA 60	Prysmian Group	Giancarlo Pedote (ITA)	80d 22h 42m 20s	
4 / 29	2017	2016–2017 Vendée Globe	IMOCA 60	StMichel-Virbac	Jean-Pierre Dick (FRA)	80 d 01 h 45 m 45 s	
Transatlantic Races
6 / 22	2021	Transat Jacques Vabre	IMOCA 60	Prysmian Group	Giancarlo Pedote (ITA); Martin Le Pape (FRA)	20d 19h 17m	
17 / 29	2019	Transat Jacques Vabre	IMOCA 60	Prysmian Group	Giancarlo Pedote (ITA); Anthony Marchand (FRA)	15d 15h 26m	
2 / 20	2018	Route du Rhum	IMOCA 60	Ucar - St Michel, FRA 06	Yann Elies (FRA)	12d 13h 38m	
1 / 13	2017	Transat Jacques Vabre	IMOCA 60	StMichel-Virbac	Jean-Pierre Dick (FRA); Yann Elies (FRA)	13d 07h 36m	
DNF / 42	2015	Transat Jacques Vabre	IMOCA 60	StMichel-Virbac	Jean-Pierre Dick (FRA); Fabien Delahaye (FRA)		
Other Races
