= IMOCA 60 Galileo =

Round the World Racing Yacht

The IMOCA 60 class yacht Galileo, BRA 411 was designed by Angelo Lavranos and Artech Design Team launched in June 2005 and built by Artech do Brasil.

== Racing results ==
Pos	Year	Race	Class	Boat name	Skipper	Notes	Ref
Round the world races
DNF / 33	2021	2020–2021 Vendée Globe	IMOCA 60	Merci, FRA 69	Sébastien Destremau (FRA)		
10 / 20	2013	2016–2017 Vendée Globe	IMOCA 60	Foresight Natural Energy, NZL 08	Conrad Colman (NZL)	110d 01h 58m	
DNF	2009	2008–2009 Vendée Globe	IMOCA 60	Maisonneuve	Jean Baptiste Dejeanty (FRA)		
Transatlantic Races
Other Races
