= IMOCA 60 Delta Dore =

Sailboat

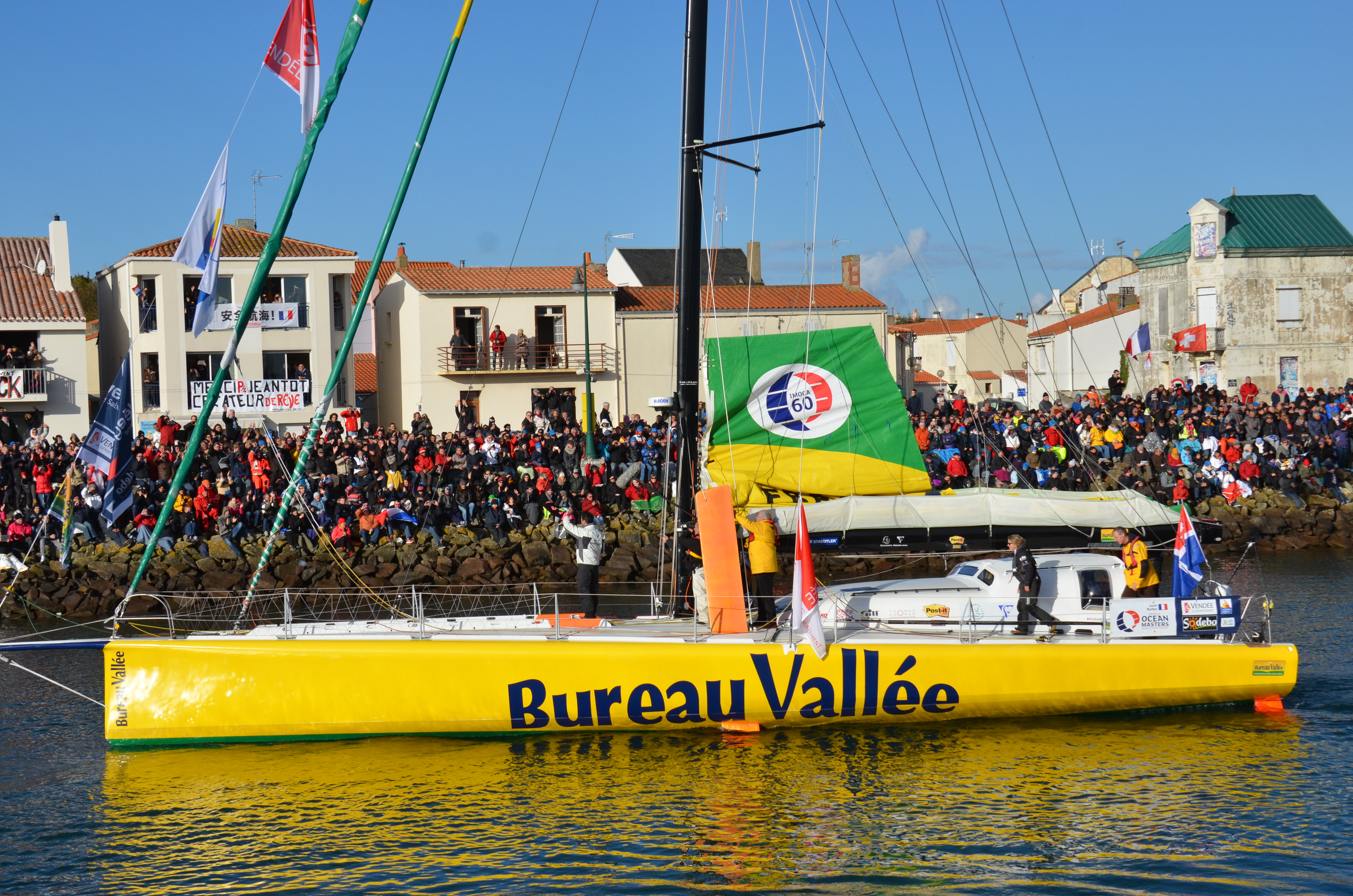

Development
- Designer: Farr Yacht Design
- Year: 26 July 2006
- Builder: JMV Industries

Hull
- Hull weight: Carbon Sandwich

Hull appendages
- Keel: Canting Keel
- Ballast: Water Ballast
- Rudder: Twin Rudders

Rig
- Rig type: Sloop

Racing
- Class association: IMOCA 60

The IMOCA 60 class yacht Delta Dore was designed by Farr Yacht Design and launched in the 2006 after being built by JMV, based in Cherbourg, France.

== Names and ownership ==
Delta Dore (2006–2011)

- Skipper: Jérémie Beyou

Bureau Vallée (2011–2017)

- Skipper: Louis Burton

Vers un monde sans sida (2017–2020)

- Skipper: Eric Nigon

La Compagnie du Lit - Jiliti (2020–2021)

- Skipper: Clément Giraud

Cap Agir Ensemble

Foussier-Mon Courtier Énergie (since 2022)

- Skipper: Sébastien Marsset
- Sail no.: FRA 83

== Racing results ==
Pos	Year	Race	Class	Boat name	Skipper	Notes	Ref
Round the world races
21 / 33	2020	2020–2021 Vendée Globe	IMOCA 60	La Compagnie du Lit - Jiliti, FRA	Clément Giraud (FRA)	99d 20h 08m	
7 / 29	2016	2016–2017 Vendée Globe	IMOCA 60	Bureau Vallée	Louis Burton (FRA)	87D 21h 45S	
DNF	2012	2012–2013 Vendée Globe	IMOCA 60	Bureau Vallée	Louis Burton (FRA)		
DNF	2008	2008–2009 Vendée Globe	IMOCA 60	Delta Dore	Jérémie Beyou (FRA)		
DNF/9	2007	Barcelona World Race	IMOCA 60	Delta Dore	Sydney Gavignet (FRA); Jérémie Beyou (FRA)		
Transatlantic Races
17 / 22	2021	Transat Jacques Vabre	IMOCA 60	La Compagnie du Lit - Jiliti, FRA	Clément Giraud (FRA); Erik Nigon (FRA)	22d 01h 26m	
27 / 29	2019	Transat Jacques Vabre	IMOCA 60	Vers Un Monde Sans Sida	Erik Nigon (FRA) Tolga Ekrem Pamir (TUR)	19d 01h 42m	
10 / 20	2018	Route du Rhum	IMOCA 60	Vers Un Monde Sans Sida	Erik Nigon (FRA)	17d 07h 34m	
5 / 9	2014	Route du Rhum	IMOCA 60	Bureau Vallée, FRA 35	Louis Burton (FRA)	14d 01h 33m	
5 / 9	2013	Transat Jacques Vabre	IMOCA 60	Bureau Vallée, FRA 35	Louis Burton (FRA); Guillaume Le Brec (FRA)	20d 02h 19m	
7 / 13	2011	Transat Jacques Vabre	IMOCA 60	Bureau Vallée, FRA 35	Louis Burton (FRA); Nelson Burton (FRA)		
DNF / 12	2006	Route du Rhum	IMOCA 60	Delta Dore	Jérèmie Beyou (FRA)		
Other Races
