= Alan Roura =

Swiss professional sailor (born 1993)

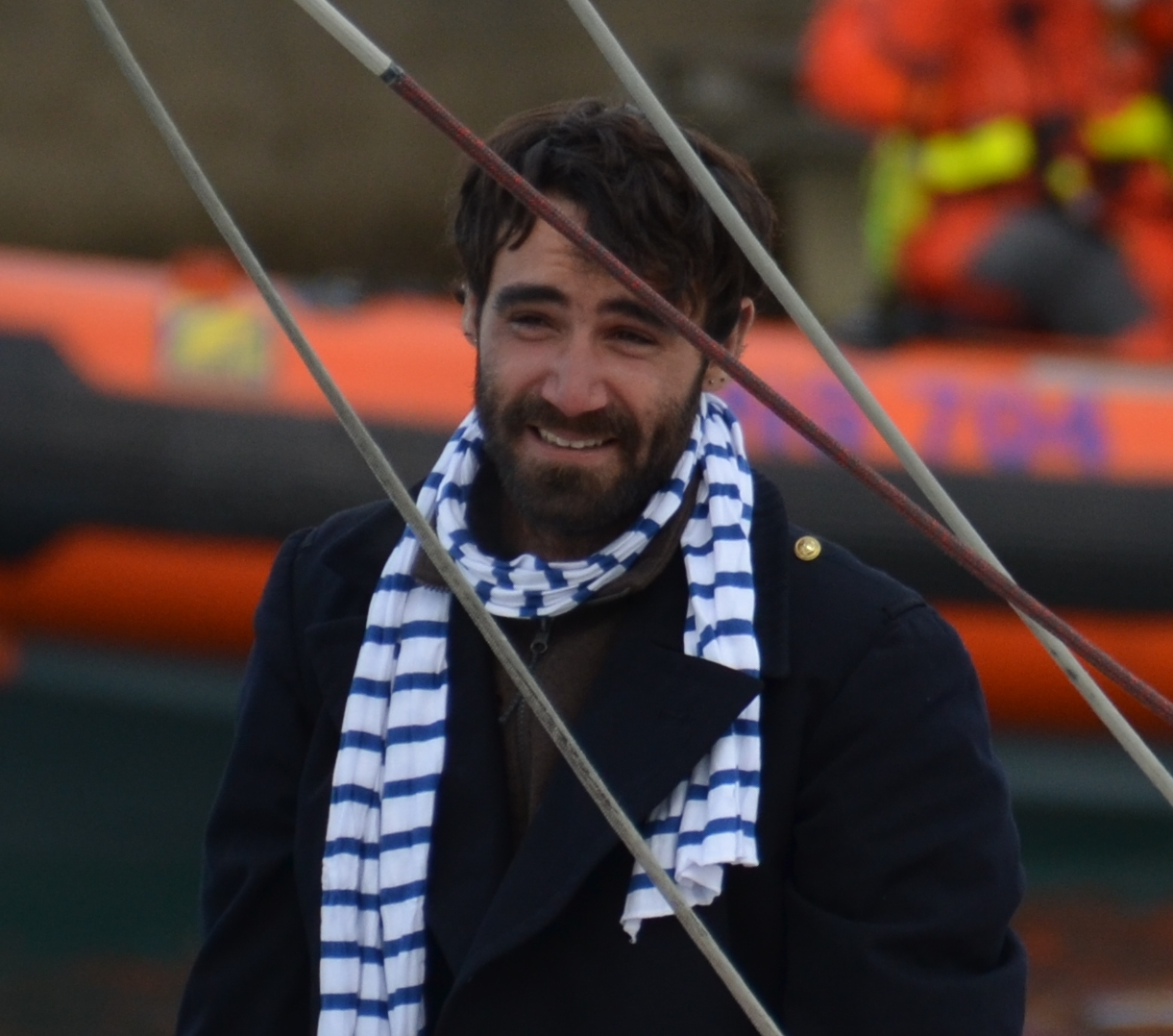

Personal information
- Nationality: Swiss
- Born: 26 February 1993 (age 33) Onex

Sailing career
- Sport: Sailing
- Class: IMOCA 60

Alan Roura is a Swiss professional sailor, born on 26 February 1993 in Onex (Switzerland). At the age of 23, in the 2016–2017 Vendée Globe which he finished in 12th place, he became the youngest competitor in the history of the event. In 2019, on La Fabrique, the second IMOCA of the name, he set a solo crossing of the North Atlantic on a 60-foot monohull crossing in a record time of 7 days, 16 hours, 58 minutes and 25 seconds. After 95 days at sea, he finished 17th in the 2020–2021 Vendée Globe. In October 2021, Alan Roura and his sponsors announced the purchase of a new IMOCA 60 for the Vendée Globe 2024: The ex hugo boss, a 2019 VPLP-design previously owned by the British skipper Alex Thomson.

== Results ==
Pos	Year	Event	Class	Boat name	Notes	Ref.
Round the World Races
17	2020–21	2020–2021 Vendée Globe	IMOCA 60	La Fabrique (2)	95d 06h 09m 56s	
12	2016–17:	2016–2017 Vendée Globe	IMOCA 60	La Fabrique (1)	105d 20h 10m 32s	
Trans Oceanic Races
21	2020	Transat Jacques Vabre	IMOCA 60	La Fabrique (2)	with Sébastien Audigane (FRA); 16d 05h 13m 30s	
9	2017	Transat Jacques Vabre	IMOCA 60	La Fabrique (2)	with Frédéric Denis (FRA); 16h 02h 04m 16s	
10	2015	Transat Jacques Vabre	Class40	Club 103	with Juliette Petrès (FRA); 32d 22h 38m 35s	
7	2018	Route du Rhum	IMOCA 60	La Fabrique (2)	15d 02h 25m 37s	
RET	2014	Route du Rhum	Class40			
11	2013	Mini Transat				
	2019	Single handed North Atlantic crossing record			7d 16h 55m	
Other Results
14	2020	Défi Azimut				
15	2019	Défi Azimut				
8	2019	Rolex Fastnet Race				
6	2018	Monaco Globe Series				
7	2015	Grand Prix Guyader				

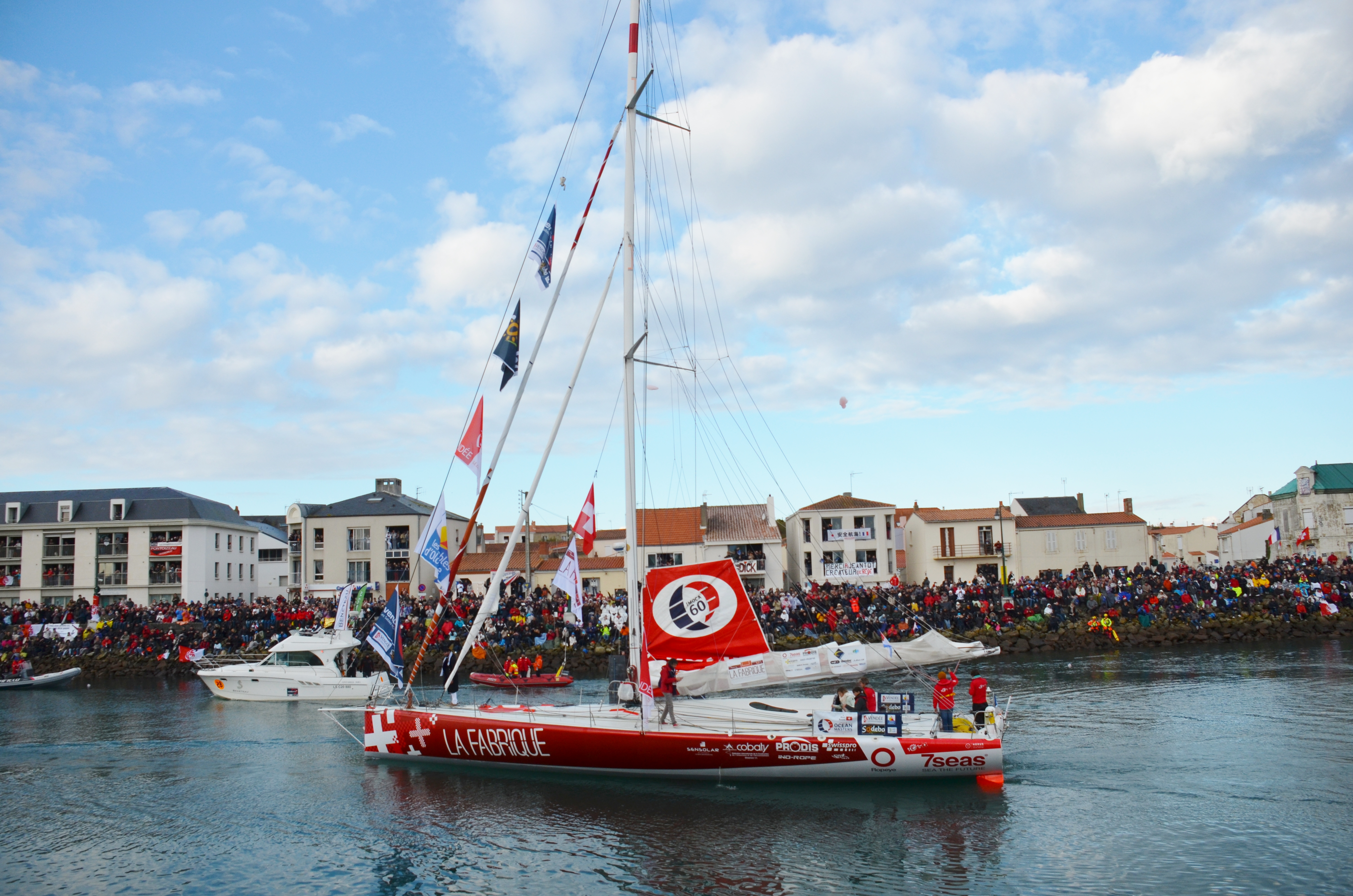
Roura at the start of the 2016–2017 Vendée Globe
