= Ari Huusela =

Finnish pilot

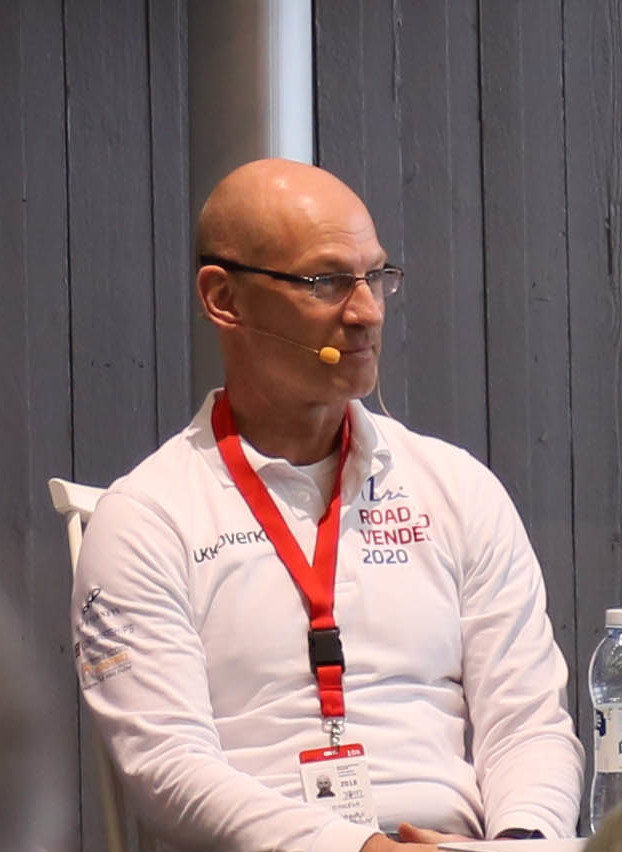
- Born: October 28, 1962 (age 63); Helsinki, Finland
- Occupation: Captain of an aircraft
- Known for: Single-handed sailing

Ari Huusela (born 28 October 1962) is a professional Finnish pilot and amateur offshore single-handed sailor. He has flown 25,000 hours and (before Vendée Globe) has sailed over 50,000 nautical miles.

He is a participant in the 2020-2021 Vendée Globe race, a quadrennial competition in which participants attempt to sail around the world single-handed and non-stop. He is the first person from the Nordic countries to have participated and finished this race.

== Education and career as an airline pilot ==
Huusela studied in a vocational school, to be an aviation mechanic, and while doing that he worked as an intern with Finnaviation, where he also was able to work after graduation. At the same time, Huusela studied to get his pilot's licence. Graduating as a mechanic was just an intermediate stage, as he was aiming to become a professional aircraft pilot. He received his licence in 1982.

While aboard a Finnair DC-9, a friendly airline captain saw his enthusiasm and helped him to get to practice, flying with the Finnair Flying Club Piper PA-28 Cherokee Arrow, and after that Huusela got a job flying freight with RV-Aviation. Later he also flew with Airlift and Karair, until he was admitted to the Finnair Aviation School in Pori, to study to become a first officer. He has since flown the following aircraft: Saab 340 (as first officer, 1990–1997), DC-9 (as first officer, 1997–2000, as captain 2001–2003), ATR (as captain, 2000–2001), Airbus A320 (as captain, 2003–2008), Airbus A330 and A340 (as captain, 2008–2016). He has since been a captain with Finnair's Airbus A350 -aircraft on the Asian routes.

== Sailing career ==
Ari Huusela started to sail only in 1986, at the age of 24, and he has now sailed competitively for more than 30 years. He won the Finnish championship of sailing in the open sea in 1997. In 1999, Huusela participated for the first time in the Trans-Atlantic Mini Transat 6.50 race with his 6.5 meter boat Pomi. He was the best of the Nordic participants, finishing 13th in the race. In the autumn of 2007, he participated in the race for a second time, and managed to finish it again. In 2007, the Transat 6,50 race started from La Rochelle, France, and continued via Madeira to Salvador da Bahia in Brazil. Only two Finns have ever been able to participate in Classe Mini transantlantic races, Reima Alander in 1997 and Ari Huusela in 1999 and 2007.

In 2014, Huusela was the first participant from the Nordic countries to finish the Route du Rhum single-handed sailing race from Saint-Malo, France, to Guadeloupe, with his boat Neste Oil. He raced in the class RHUM .

In 2017, Huusela bought his IMOCA known before as Aviva (Owen Clarke Design 2007). In 2018, he became the first person from the Nordic countries to have participated and finished in the Imoca Globe Series race. The race was the Route du Rhum 2018. In the spring of 2019, Huusela did the Imoca Globe Series Bermudes 1000 Race (2 000 nautical miles). In the autumn of 2019, Huusela again made Nordic sailing history when he captained his boat, IMOCA Ariel II, to the finish line of the legendary coffee race Transat Jacques Vabre. A double-handed race co-skippered by Irishman Mikey Ferguson.

In 2020, Huusela became the first Nordic skipper to participate in the legendary Vendée Globe race around the world alone, non-stop. His boat is the same one he used in the Route du Rhum 2018, i.e. Aviva, but renamed Stark before the Vendée Globe. Huusela crossed the finish line of the iconic race after 116 days 18 hours 15 minutes on March 5, 2021.

== Single-handed races across the Atlantic ==
Ari Huusela's single-handed races across the Atlantic
Year	Race	Boat	Class	Route	Position	References
1999	Mini Transat	Pomi	Mini 6,50	France – Lanzarote – Guadeloupe, the Caribbean	13.	
2007	Transat 650	Wippies	Mini 6,50	France – Madeira – Salvador da Bahia, Brazil		
2014	Route du Rhum	Neste Oil	RHUM (Pogo40)	France – Guadeloupe, the Caribbean		
2018	Route du Rhum	Ariel2	IMOCA	France – Guadeloupe, the Caribbean		
Other IMOCA Globe Series Races
Year	Race	Boat	Class	Route	Position	References
2019	Bermudes 1000 Race	Ariel2	IMOCA	Douarnenez – 2 000 NM – Brest		
2019	Transat Jacques Vabre^{a}	Ariel2	IMOCA	France – Brazil		

^{a} Note: Double-handed, co-skipper: Mikey Ferguson. Ariel II is the same boat with which Huusela now participates in the Vendée Globe race, only now renamed Stark after his main sponsor.

== In Vendée Globe ==
Ari Huusela in Vendée Globe 2020–21, 116 days, 18 hours, 15 minutes
Stage	Country/Continent	Longitude	Reached on, date and time	Position	References
Start, Les Sables-d'Olonne	France	1° 47' 43" W	8 Nov 2020, ca. 13.00 UTC	–	
Cape of Good Hope	South Africa	18° 28' 26" E	12 Dec 2020, 11.32 UTC	27.	
Cape Leeuwin	Western Australia	115° 08' 10" E	29 Dec 2020, 22.23 UTC	26.	
Cape Horn	South America	67° 16' 00 " W	25 Jan 2021, 01.19 UTC	25.	
Finish, Les Sables-d'Olonne	France	1° 47' 43" W	5 Mar 2021 7.35 UTC	25	
