= Kojiro Shiraishi =

Shiraishi, Kojiro 白石 康次郎
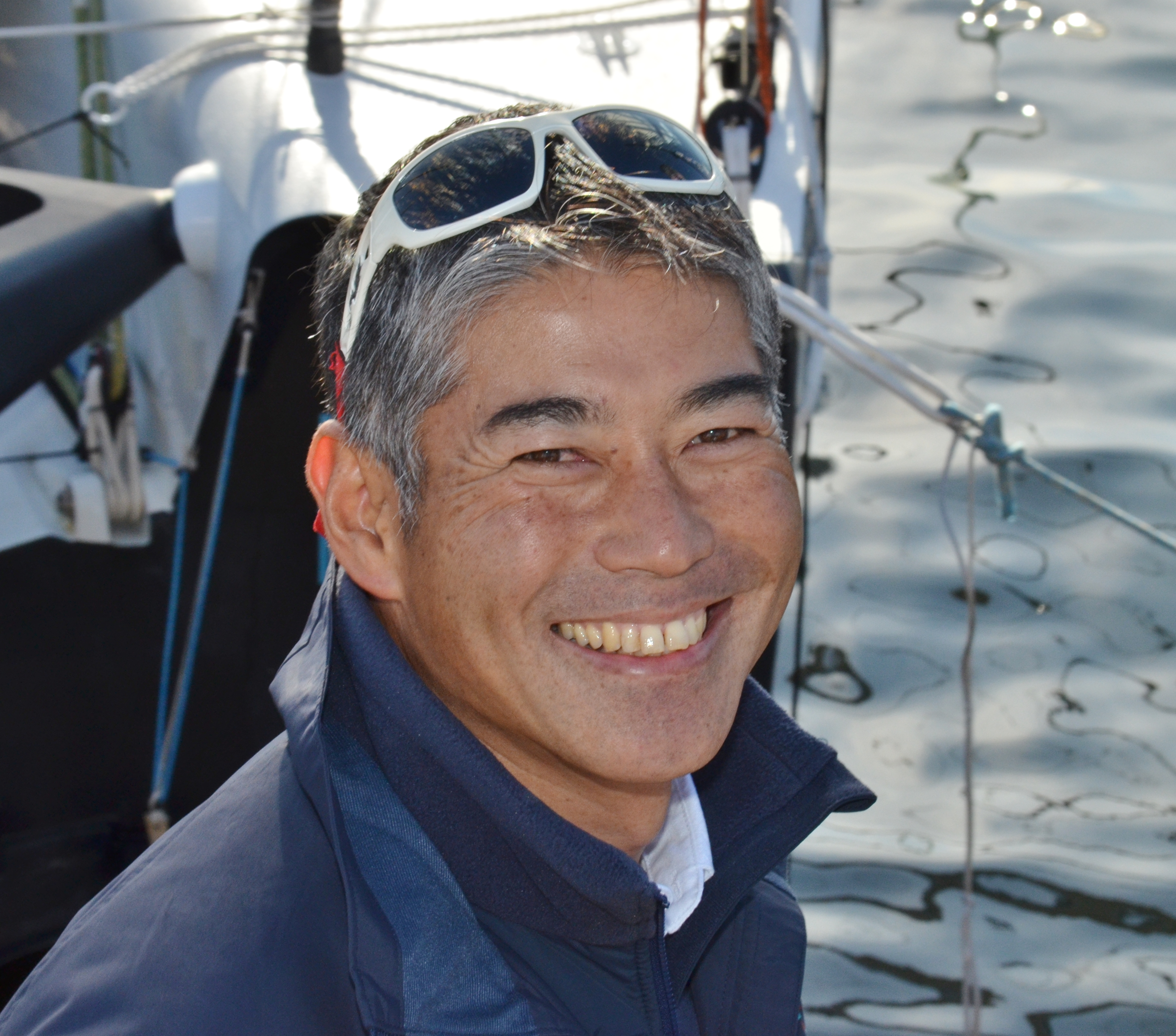
- Vendée Globe 2016-2017
- Born: Shiraishi, Kojiro; 8 May 1967 (age 59); Kamakura, Japan
- Occupation: Sailor
- Website: Kojiro Shiraishi Official Website

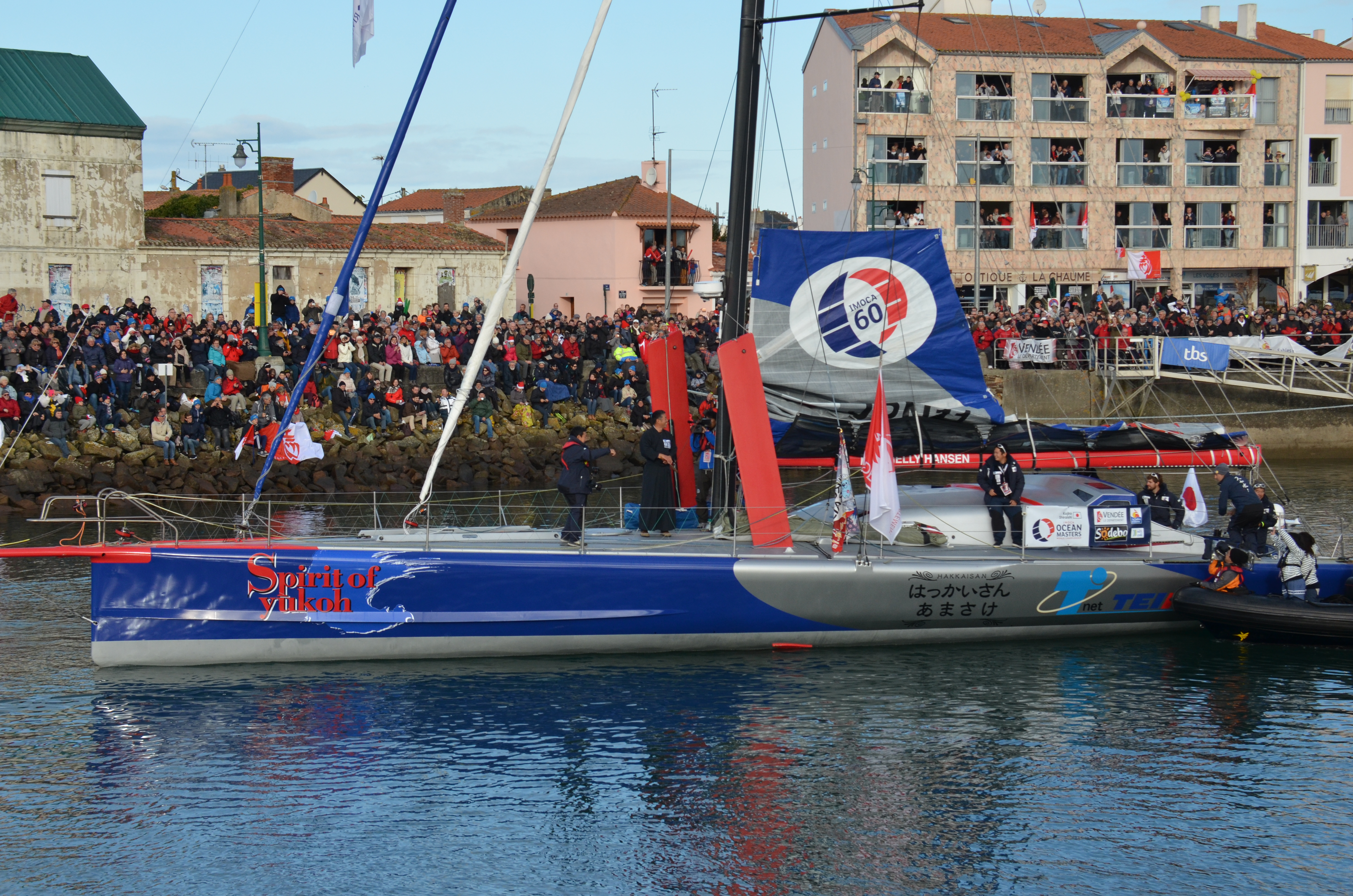
Kojiro Shiraishi au départ du Vendée Globe 2016

Kojiro Shiraishi (白石 康次郎, Shiraishi Kōjirō) is a Japanese sailor who holds the record as the youngest sailor ever to circumnavigate the globe in a 176-day continuous, single-handed, unassisted journey in 1994.

== Biography ==
He was born in Tokyo and grew up in Kamakura.

He raced his first around the globe race in 2002 during the Around Alone where he finished 4th (Class40), then in the Velux 5 Oceans Race in 2006 where he finished 2nd (IMOCA).

In 2005, he participated in the Velux 5 Oceans Race in his boat, Spirit of Yukoh, and placed second, beating notable sailors such as Sir Robin Knox-Johnston and Mike Golding.

He was the first Asian sailor to take part in the Vendée Globe in 2016, but was forced to drop out from the race following a loss of the mast off Cape Town, South Africa. He returned for the 2020-2021 Vendee Globe where he became the first asian sailor to start and complete the race in a time of 94d 21h 32m 56s although he suffered significant sail damage early on the race he persevered and finish the race.

He completed the 2024 Vendée Globe, finishing in 24th place, with an overall time of 90 days, 21 hours, 34 minutes, and 41 seconds.

== Bibliography ==
- Kojiro Shiraishi, "Crossing the Seven Seas: The Youngest Yacht in History, Around the World without a Call" (Bungei Shunju, 2000) ISBN 978-4167679132
- Ken Noguchi, Kojiro Shiraishi "Great Adventures: Why We Challenge the World" (Bungei Shunju, 2000) ISBN 978-4163562704
- "Adventurer: Dream and courage for us... Around the world of a single yacht" (Takarajimasha, 2003) ISBN 978-4796636544
- "Around Alone: The World's Toughest Sea Adventure" (Bungei Shunju, 2004) ISBN 9784163657608
- "What I learned in life was learned on the sea: there are walls. Still dream come true" (Yamato Publishing, 2006) ISBN 9784479391500
