= 2020–2021 Vendée Globe =

9th edition - Solo None Stop - Round the World Race

Event title
- Name: 2020–2021 Vendée Globe
- Edition: 9th edition
- Sponsor: Vendée Region of France

Event details
- Start location: Les Sables-d'Olonne
- Finish location: Les Sables-d'Olonne
- Course: Single person non-stop round the world race
- Dates: Start: 8 November 2020; First finisher: 27 January 2021; Last finisher: 5 March 2021
- Yachts: IMOCA 60
- Key people: Race Director; Jacques Caraës

Competitors
- Competitors: 33

Results
- (gold) Gold: Yannick Bestaven (FRA)
- (silver) Silver: Charlie Dalin (FRA)
- (bronze) Bronze: Louis Burton (FRA)

The 2020–2021 Vendée Globe was a non-stop round the world yacht race for IMOCA 60 class yachts crewed by only one person. It was the ninth edition of the race, which started and finished in Les Sables-d'Olonne, France. The race began on 8 November 2020, with the first finishers completing the course on 27 January 2021 with the 25th and final yacht to complete the race arrived on 5 March 2021.

== Report ==
With a record number of 33 starter and 25 finishers, there was also a record number of six female competitors. This race was exceptionally close with the first eight sailors separated by less than 24 hours and literally with 12 hours to go the winner was not determined. The reason for this was due to compression in the fleet caused by the weather systems in addition to the large number of competitive entries and some of the pre race favorites being among the non-finishers.

== Media exposure ==
The international media exposure reached an all-time high in part due to the event being able to proceed during the COVID-19 pandemic due to its naturally isolative nature. With social mobility limited and large sectors of nations work force not working the race filled a void while other sport competitions were cancelled. The main spectator negatives happened at a national level with the race village not getting the usual hundred of thousands of visitors. The hardest thing for the international sailors was who could welcome them at the race finish with close family unable to attend, there was also reduced spectators and the race organisers made sure all the French competitors entered the finishing port during daylight hours to avoid the curfew restrictions.

The international coverage was led by daily show broadcasts on YouTube, Daily Motion and Facebook with the English edition led by Andi Robertson. The openness of the skippers to media varied, with Pip Hare and Boris Herrmann engaging extensively with online broadcast. There was also increasing media participation with the French skippers in the race. In terms of openness even at the front of the fleet the intentions of some sailors were open while others hid both sail plans and the extent of damage to the other boats until after the race finish.

It had high-profile followers with French President Emmanuel Macron and the Prince of Monaco engaging in the race and its media.

Alongside the race for the fourth time a web based online routing game mirroring the race ran by Virtual Regatta this was the largest ever online sailing game with 1,000,000 unique users. It was won by French sailor Jean-Claude Goudon, whose user name was “tigrou26120,” finished in a time of 68 days, 22 hours, 16 minutes and 4 seconds.

== Public interest ==
The unique thing about the Vendee Globe is the characters involved due to the challenges. Sailors that waited to the last minute allowing them to secure sponsorship were Alexia Barrier, Ari Huusela and Pip Hare. Sailors had different objectives – from Ari Huusela on a lifetime adventure with the only aim to complete the race through to the long time challengers like Alex Thompson who had a win at all cost mentality.

Former winner Alain Gautier in post race explained how Benjamin Dutreux, Damien Seguin, Yannick Bestaven and Louis Burton were the few sailing their boats closest to their potential in terms of speed, but he also admired the approach of Boris Herrmann who had a more conservative approach.

== Incidents ==
=== PRB sinking and rescue ===
On day 22 of the race, Kevin Escoffier (FRA)'s yacht, PRB, suddenly broke apart and sank in the Roaring Forties, 840 miles southwest of Cape Town. He was rescued by fellow competitor Jean Le Cam (FRA). He later described how the boat literally folded in half and he struggled to release the life raft due to the speed of the situation.

The sailors that were involved in the rescue were awarded time compensation by the International Jury for their assistance with the following

(1) Jean Le Cam was awarded a 16hr 15min time compensation for rescuing Kevin Escoffier.
(2) Boris Herrmann was awarded a 6hr time compensation for aiding in the rescue.
(3) Yannick Bestaven was awarded a 10hr 15min time compensation for aiding in the rescue.

=== Hydrofoil damage ===
The introduction of hydrofoils to the 2016 edition of the race lead to their largescale adoption amongst the fleet. There was intense discussion about the cost, efficiency, vulnerability, sea keeping effects and structural implication of the development. Certainly their efficiency was shown with both "L’Occitane En Provence" and "Charal" sailing through the fleet and the foiler finishing in the top 3 position winning the short drag race to the finish the weather systems created.

Both Thomas Ruyant and Charlie Dalin suffered hydrofoil issues that compromised their race. Boris Herrmann also suffered foil damage in his collision with a fishing boat although it could be argued the impact to the foils stopped the deck spreaders from breaking. The sinking of PRB and its links to foil is at present unknown but certainly the boat had undergone extensive modification to refit and Kevin described the way the boat accelerated before failing. Their benefits in a seaway was also questioned as was the ride given by semi foiling nature with sailors saying the fully retractable foil configuration had distinct advantages in extreme conditions.

=== Rudder damage ===
On the third day Jérémie Beyou onboard Charal returned to the start to repair a damaged rudder due to a collision with a floating object, he started again 9 days 2 h 50 min after the initial fleet start. Pip Hare on Medallia discovered cracks to her rudder stock and replaced the rudder with a spare near Cape Horn. Alex Thomson on Hugo Boss 7 retired with steering issues.

=== Collisions ===
Boris Herrmann on Sea Explorer – Yacht Club De Monaco was 90 miles from the finish line when he hit a fishing boat causing extensive damage to the boat. Due to the proximity to the finish line he was able to finish the race. Sam Davies retired due to an impact with unidentified floating object.

== Results ==
Classified results for the 2020–2021 edition
Pos.	Sail no.	Boat name	Year	Skipper	G	Finish time	Elapsed time	Deltas	Delta %	Speed rhum/water	Distance sailed	Ref.
1	FRA 17	Maître Coq IV §	2015	Yannick Bestaven (FRA)	M	2021-01-28 - 04:19:46	80d 03h 44m 46s Corrected; 80d 13h 59m 46s Elapsed		0%	12.67 / 14.86	28583.8	
2	FRA 79	Apivia §	2019	Charlie Dalin (FRA)	M	2021-01-27 - 20:35:47	80d 06h 15m 47s	0d 02h 31m 01s	0.13%	12.65 / 15.13	29135	
3	FRA 18	Bureau Vallée 2 §	2015	Louis Burton (FRA)	M	2021-01-28 - 00:45:12	80d 10h 25m 12s	0d 06h 40m 26s	0.35%	12.62 / 14.84	28650	
4	FRA 001	Yes We Cam!	2007	Jean Le Cam (FRA)	M	2021-01-28 - 20:19:55	80d 13h 44m 55s Corrected; 81d 05h 59m 55s Elapsed	0d 10h 00m 09s	0.52%	12.6 / 14.22	27501.5	
5	MON 10	Sea Explorer – Yacht Club De Monaco §	2015	Boris Herrmann (GER)	M	2021-01-28 - 11:19:45	80d 14h 59m 45s Corrected; 80d 20h 59m 45s Elapsed	0d 11h 14m 59s	0.58%	12.59 / 14.7	28448.5	
6	FRA 59	Linkedout §	2019	Thomas Ruyant (FRA)	M	2021-01-28 - 05:42:01	80d 15h 22m 01s	0d 11h 37m 15s	0.6%	12.59 / 15.07	29175.5	
7	FRA 1000	Groupe Apicil	2008	Damien Seguin (FRA)	M	2021-01-28 - 12:18:20	80d 21h 58m 20s	0d 18h 13m 34s	0.95%	12.55 / 14.17	27512.3	
8	ITA 34	Prysmian Group §	2015	Giancarlo Pedote (ITA)	M	2021-01-28 - 13:02:20	80d 22h 42m 20s	0d 18h 57m 34s	0.99%	12.54 / 14.67	28489.9	
9	FRA 09	Omia – Water Family	2007	Benjamin Dutreux (FRA)	M	2021-01-29 - 10:05:20	81d 19h 45m 20s	1d 16h 45m 34s	2.08%	12.41 / 14.17	27832.5	
10	FRA 53	V and B – Mayenne	2007	Maxime Sorel (FRA)	M	2021-01-30 - 04:50:15	82d 14h 30m 15s	2d 10h 45m 29s	3.05%	12.29 / 13.79	27346.9	
11	FRA 2	L’Occitane En Provence §	2020	Armel Tripon (FRA)	M	2021-02-01 - 07:27:50	84d 17h 07m 50s	4d 13h 23m 04s	5.69%	11.98 / 13.93	28315.2	
12	FRA 30	Banque Populaire X	2011	Clarisse Crémer (FRA)	F	2021-02-03 - 16:44:25	87d 02h 24m 25s	6d 22h 39m 39s	8.66%	11.66 / 13.25	27697.1	
13	FRA 8	Charal §	2018	Jérémie Beyou (FRA)	M	2021-02-06 - 09:15:58	89d 18h 55m 58s	9d 15h 11m 12s	12.02%	11.31 / 13.8	29728.5	
14	FRA 49	Pure – Best Western	2007	Romain Attanasio (FRA)	M	2021-02-06 - 17:06:02	90d 02h 46m 02s	9d 23h 01m 16s	12.42%	11.27 / 12.76	27597	
15	FRA 14	La Mie Câline – Artisans Artipôle §	2007	Arnaud Boissières (FRA)	M	2021-02-11 - 08:56:06	94d 18h 36m 06s	14d 14h 51m 20s	18.24%	10.71 / 12.51	28456.7	
16	JPN 11	DMG Mori §	2019	Kojiro Shiraishi (JPN)	M	2021-02-11 - 11:52:56	94d 21h 32m 56s	14d 17h 48m 10s	18.39%	10.7 / 12.76	29067.7	
17	SUI 07	La Fabrique §	2007	Alan Roura (SUI)	M	2021-02-11 - 20:29:56	95d 06h 09m 56s	15d 02h 25m 10s	18.84%	10.66 / 12.51	28603.3	
18	FRA 92	Time for Oceans §	2007	Stéphane Le Diraison (FRA)	M	2021-02-11 - 22:36:00	95d 08h 16m 00s	15d 04h 31m 14s	18.95%	10.65 / 12.53	28663.5	
19	GBR 77	Medallia	2000	Pip Hare (GBR)	F	2021-02-12 - 01:57:30	95d 11h 37m 30s	15d 07h 52m 44s	19.12%	10.63 / 12.21	27976.9	
20	ESP 33	One Planet One Ocean	2000	Didac Costa (ESP)	M	2021-02-13 - 20:47:03	97d 06h 27m 03s	17d 02h 42m 17s	21.35%	10.44 / 12.07	28172.7	
21	FRA	Compagnie Du Lit / Jiliti	2006	Clément Giraud (FRA)	M	2021-02-16 - 10:28:31	99d 20h 08m 31s	19d 16h 23m 45s	24.56%	10.17 / 11.74	28137.8	
22	FRA 50	Campagne De France	2006	Miranda Merron (GBR)	F	2021-02-17 - 23:16:51	101d 08h 56m 51s	21d 05h 12m 05s	26.47%	10.01 / 11.37	27656.2	
23	FRA 71	Groupe Sétin	2007	Manuel Cousin (FRA)	M	2021-02-20 - 08:35:40	103d 18h 15m 40s	23d 14h 30m 54s	29.45%	9.78 / 11.69	29115.7	
24	FRA 06	TSE – 4myplanet	1998	Alexia Barrier (FRA)	F	2021-02-28 - 07:23:44	111d 17h 03m 00s	31d 13h 18m 14s	39.37%	9.09 / 10.51	28170.7	
25	FIN 222	Stark	2007	Ari Huusela (FIN)	M	2021-03-05 - 08:35:46	116d 18h 15m 46s	36d 14h 31m 00s	45.67%	8.7 / 10.39	29122	
DNF	FRA 69	Merci	2005	(Australia) / (France) Sébastien Destremau	M	2021-01-16 12:00:00	Steering + other issues 60 nm south of New Zealand, retired unaided to Christchurch					
DNF		MACSF §	2007	(France) / (Germany) Isabelle Joschke	F	2021-01-09 21:23:00	Day 62 Canting Keel Mechanism Failure retired unaided Salvador, Bahia. She completed the race unofficial in a time of 107d 20h 54m.					
DNF		Newrest – Art & Fenêtres §	2015	Fabrice Amedeo (FRA)	M	2020-12-11 14:42:00	General computer failure, diverted to and retired unaided to Cape Town					
DNF		Initiatives-cœur (3) §	2010	Samantha Davies (GBR)	F	2020-12-05 13:00:00	Day 26: keel damage following collision with unidentified floating object; retired unaided in Cape Town. She continued outside the race unofficially in a time of 109d 23h 40m.					
DNF		Arkea – Paprec §	2019	Sébastien Simon (FRA)	M	2020-12-04 14:00:00	Day 25: damaged starboard foil following collision with floating object; retired unaided to Cape Town					
DNF		Hugo Boss 7 §	2019	Alex Thomson (GBR)	M	2020-12-04 08:30:00	Day 21: rudder damage, diverted to and retired unaided to Cape Town					
DNF		PRB 4 §	2010	Kevin Escoffier (FRA)	M	2020-12-01 08:00:00	Structural hull failure, abandoned to liferaft; boat lost					
DNF		Corum L’Épargne §	2020	Nicolas Troussel (FRA)	M	2020-11-16 15:00:00	Day 8: Dismasted, diverted unaided to Cape Verde Islands					

§ – boat equipped with hydrofoils

== Competitors ==
General classification
Skipper	Previous Start / Finish	Name of boat	Sail no.	Hydrofoils	Designer	Ref.	Year launched	Notes	Ref.
Alan Roura (SUI)	1 / 1 (12th)	La Fabrique	SUI 07	Yes	Finot – Conq	Multiplast (FRA)	2007-07-17	2019 Foils retrofitted	
Alex Thomson (GBR)	4 / 2 (2nd)	Hugo Boss 7	GBR 99	Yes	VPLP – Pete Hobson	Carrington Boats (GBR)	2019-04-08		
Alexia Barrier (FRA)	0	TSE – 4myplanet	FRA 72	No	Marc Lombart	MAG (FRA)	1998-01-31		
Ari Huusela (FIN)	0	Stark	FIN 222	No	Owen-Clarke	Hakes Marine (NZL)	2007-12-17		
Armel Tripon (FRA)	0	L’Occitane En Provence	FRA 02	Yes	Sam Manuard	Black Pepper Yachts	2020-01-31	First SCOW Design	
Arnaud Boissières (FRA)	3 / 3 (8th)	La Mie Câline – Artisans Artipôle	FRA 14	Yes	Owen-Clarke	Hakes Marine (NZL)	2007		
Benjamin Dutreux (FRA)	0	Omia – Water Family	FRA 09	No	Farr Yacht Design	Offshore Challenges, Cowes (GBR)	2007-06-25		
Boris Herrmann (GER)	0	Sea Explorer – Yacht Club De Monaco	MON 10	Yes	VPLP – Verdier	Multiplast (FRA)	2015-08-06		
Charlie Dalin (FRA)	0	Apivia	FRA 79	Yes	Guillaume Verdier	CDK Technologies (FRA)	2019-05-08		
Clarisse Crémer (FRA)	0	Banque Populaire X	FRA 30	No	VPLP – Verdier	CDK Technologies (FRA)	2011-08-16		
Clément Giraud (FRA)	0	Compagnie Du Lit / Jiliti	FRA 83	No	Farr Yacht Design	JMV Industries (FRA)	2006-07-26		
Damien Seguin (FRA)	0	Groupe Apicil	FRA 1000	No	Finot – Conq	Multiplast (FRA)	2008-05-29		
Didac Costa (ESP)	1 / 1 (14th)	One Planet One Ocean	ESP 33	No	Rob Humphreys / Owen-Clarke	Marten Marine (NZL)	1999		
Fabrice Amedeo (FRA)	1 / 1 (11th)	Newrest – Art & Fenêtres	FRA 56	Yes	VPLP – Verdier	Persico (ITA)	2015-08-18		
Giancarlo Pedote (ITA)	0	Prysmian Group	ITA 34	Yes	VPLP – Verdier	Vannes (FRA)	2015-09-11		
(France) / (Germany) Isabelle Joschke	0	MACSF	FRA 27	Yes	VPLP – Verdier	Chantier Naval de Larros	2007-08-06	Foils retrofitted	
Jean Le Cam (FRA)	4 / 3 (2nd)	Yes We Cam!	FRA 01	No	Farr Yacht Design	Port La Forêt	2007-05-29		
Jérémie Beyou (FRA)	3 / 1 (3rd)	Charal	FRA 08	Yes	VPLP	CDK Technologies (FRA)	2018-08-20		
Kevin Escoffier (FRA)	0	PRB 4	FRA 85	Yes	VPLP – Verdier	CDK Technologies (FRA)	2009-11-30	Foils retrofitted	
Kojiro Shiraishi (JPN)	1 / 0	DMG Mori Global One	JPN 11	Yes	VPLP	Multiplast (FRA)	2019-09-02		
Louis Burton (FRA)	2 / 1 (7th)	Bureau Vallée 2	FRA 18	Yes	VPLP – Verdier	CDK Technologies (FRA)	2015-06-09		
Manuel Cousin (FRA)	0	Groupe Sétin	FRA 71	No	Farr Yacht Design	Southern Ocean Marine (NZL)	2007-02-03		
Maxime Sorel (FRA)	0	V and B – Mayenne	FRA 53	No	VPLP – Verdier	Indiana Yachting (ITA)	2007-09-05		
Miranda Merron (GBR)	0	Campagne De France	FRA 50	No	Owen-Clarke	(NZL)	2006-01-05		
Nicolas Troussel (FRA)	0	Corum L’Épargne	FRA 6	Yes	Juan Kouyoumdjian Design	Mer Agitée & CDK Technologies (FRA)	2020		
Pip Hare (GBR)	0	Medallia	GBR 66	No	Pierre Roland	Bernard Stamm, Lesconil	2000-01-07		
Romain Attanasio (FRA)	1 / 1 (15th)	Pure – Best Western	FRA 49	No	Farr Yacht Design	NZL	2008-08-19		
Samantha Davies (GBR)	2 / 1 (5th)	Initiatives-cœur (3)	FRA 109	Yes	VPLP – Verdier	CDK Technologies (FRA)	2010-09-18	Foils retrofitted	
Sébastien Simon (FRA)	0	Arkea – Paprec	FRA 4	Yes	Juan Kouyoumdjian	CDK Technologies (FRA)	2019-07-19		
(Australia) / (France) Sébastien Destremau	1 / 1 (18th)	Merci	FRA 69	No	Lavanos	Artech do Brasil	2005-01-15		
Stéphane Le Diraison (FRA)	1 / 0	Time for Oceans	FRA 92	Yes	Finot – Conq	Neville HUTTON (GBR)	2007-06-19	Foils retrofitted	
Thomas Ruyant (FRA)	1 / 0	Linkedout	FRA 59	Yes	Guillaume Verdier	Persico Marine (ITA)	2019-09-07		
Yannick Bestaven (FRA)	1 / 0	Maître Coq IV	FRA 17	Yes	VPLP – Verdier	CDK Technologies (FRA)	2015-03-02		
