= Alexia Barrier =

French sailor (born 1979)

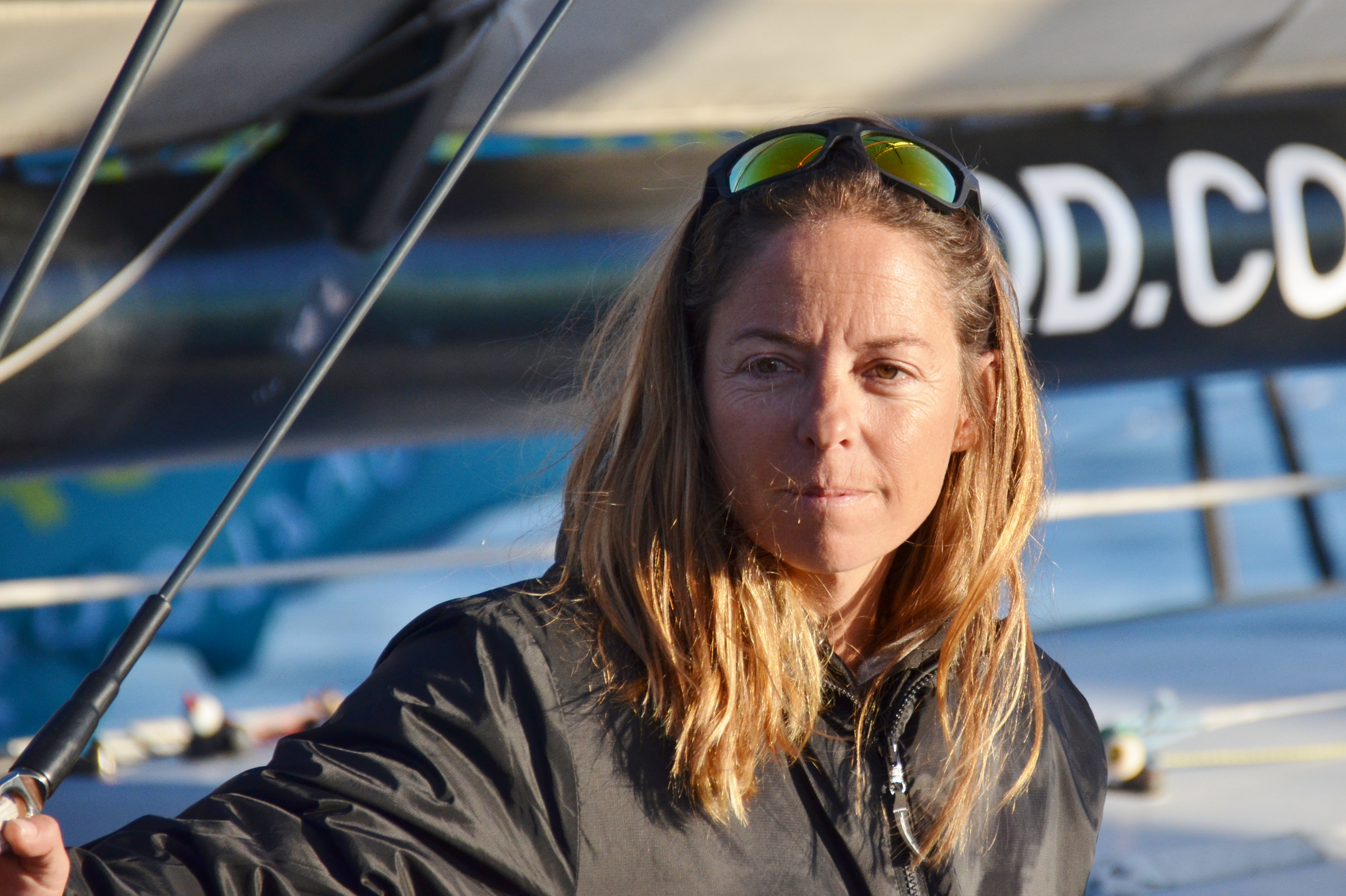

Personal information
- Nationality: French
- Born: 26 November 1979 (age 46)

Sailing career
- Sport: Sailing
- Class: IMOCA 60

Alexia Barrier (born 26 November 1979 in Paris) is a French sailor who competed in the 2020–2021 Vendee Globe. Competing with the oldest boat in the fleet and only securing sufficient funding months before the start, she completed the race in 111 days, 17 hours, 03 minutes.

== Biography ==
Born in Paris, Alexia Barrier grew up in Nice, where she discovered sailing at a young age on her parents’ boat. A sports enthusiast, she also practiced basketball and freediving, and began coaching sailing courses at the age of 15. After completing her high school diploma, she studied sports management at the University of Nice, UFR-STAPS.

She began offshore racing at the age of 25 and later took part in several major competitions, including the Transat AG2R in 2006, the Route de l’Équateur in 2007, the Maxi Transatlantic in 2011, and the Route du Rhum in 2018. In 2020–2021, she competed in the Vendée Globe aboard the yacht TSE – 4MyPlanet, finishing the race in 24th place out of 33 competitors, crossing the finish line on 28 February 2021 after 111 days, 17 hours and 3 minutes at sea.

In 2025, she took part in an attempt at the Jules Verne Trophy with an all-female crew, completing the round-the-world voyage on January 26, 2026, in 57 days, 21 hours, and 20 minutes.

== Results ==
Year	Pos.	Event	Class	Boat name	Note	Ref
2020	24	2020–2021 Vendée Globe	IMOCA 60	4 MY PLANET		
2019	25	Transat Jacques Vabre	IMOCA 60	4 MY PLANET	with Joan Mulloy	
2019	14	Bermudes 1000 Race	IMOCA 60	4 MY PLANET		
2019	2	Voiles de St Barth	Maxi	Farr 115 SOJANA	Crew	
2019	15	Route du Rhum-Destination Guadeloupe	IMOCA 60	4 MY PLANET		
2018	9	Monaco Globe Series	IMOCA 60	4 MY PLANET	with Pierre Quiroga	
2017	15	Tour de France à la Voile	Diam 24	Pink Lady		
2017	25	Solitaire du Figaro	Bénéteau Figaro 2	Piqd.com		
2016		European vice-champion de 6mJI				
2015	28	Tour de France à la Voile	Diam 24	30 Corsaires	Skipper	
2014	3	Transat AG2R-La Mondiale	Bénéteau Figaro 2	30 Corsaires		
2013	4	Voiles de St-Tropez				
2013	1	Voiles d'Antibes	8mJI	Helen		
2012	1	Yacht Club de France Trophy				
2011	1	Maxi Transatlantic	Maxi	Farr 115 - Sojana		
2007	2	Route de l'Equateur	Class40	Deep Blue	with F.Arthaud and L.Poupon	
2007		Round British Island Record, female crew				
2007		Transat Jacques-Vabre 2007	Class40	Pindar		
2006	12	Transat AG2R			with Samantha Davies	
2005		Mini Transat	Mini Transat 6.50	Proto ROXY		
2003	3	Women's Match Racing World Championship				
2003	4	Women's Match Racing European Championship				
