= Giancarlo Pedote =

Italian regatta yachtsman (born 1975)

Personal information
- Born: 26 December 1975 (age 50) Florence, Italy

Sailing career
- Sport: Sailing
- Class: IMOCA 60

Giancarlo Pedote is an Italian professional sailor born on 26 December 1975 in Florence, Italy.

== Biography ==
At the age of 14, he discovered windsurfing, then moved onto dinghy sailing starting in Hobie 16 catamaran he was also heavily into boxing. In 2001, he graduated in philosophy from the University of Florence. He is an instructor in windsurfing, dinghy sailing and catamaran sailing before he moved onto offshore sailing.

== Results ==
Year	Pos	Event	Class	Boat name	Notes	Ref.
2020	8	2020-2021 Vendee Globe	IMOCA 60	PRYSMIAN GROUP	Race time: 80d 22h 42m 20s	
2020	8	Vendée-Arctique-Les Sables d'Olonne	IMOCA 60	PRYSMIAN GROUP		
2019	13	Défi Azimut	IMOCA 60	PRYSMIAN GROUP	with Anthony Marchand	
2019	9	Rolex Fastnet Race	IMOCA 60	PRYSMIAN GROUP		
2019	3	Bermudes 1000 Race	IMOCA 60	PRYSMIAN GROUP		
2018	8	Azimut Trophy	IMOCA 60	Newrest Brioche Pasquier	with Fabrice Amedeo	
2017	12	Transat Jacques Vabre	IMOCA 60	Newrest Brioche Pasquier	with Fabrice Amedeo	
2017	8	Défi Azimut	IMOCA 60	Newrest Brioche Pasquier	with Fabrice Amedeo	
2016		Marin de l’année en Italie				
2015	1	Transat Jacques Vabre	Multi 50	FENETREA PRYSMIAN	with Erwan Le Roux	
2015	1	Grand Prix Guyader	Multi 50	FENETREA PRYSMIAN		
2015	1	Tour de Belle Ile	Multi 50	FENETREA PRYSMIAN		
2015	1	Armen Race	Multi 50	FENETREA PRYSMIAN		
2015	1	Grand Prix Las Palmas de Gran Canaria	(Multi 50)	FENETREA PRYSMIAN		
2015	1	Trofeo Prince de Bretagne Sud Goëlo	(Multi 50)	FENETREA PRYSMIAN		
2014	1	Champion de France Promotion Course au Large en Solitaire				
2014		Marin de l’année en Italie				
2014	1	Lorient-Bretagne Sud Mini 2014	Mini Transat 6.50	PRYSMIAN		
2014	1	Les Sables Les Açores Les Sables 2014	Mini Transat 6.50	PRYSMIAN		
2014	1	Pornichet Select	Mini Transat 6.50	PRYSMIAN		
2014	1	Mini en Mai	Mini Transat 6.50	PRYSMIAN		
2014	1	Trophée Marie-Agnès Péron	Mini Transat 6.50	PRYSMIAN		
2014	3	Armen Race	Class40	FANTASTICA	with AMAURY FRANCOIS	
2014	10	Route du Rhum	Class40	FANTASTICA		
2013		Champion de France Promotion Course au Large en Solitaire				
2013	2	Mini Transat Race	Mini Transat 6.50	PRYSMIAN		
2013	1	Trophée Marie-Agnès Péron -	Mini Transat 6.50	PRYSMIAN		
2013	1	Trinité Plymouth	Mini Transat 6.50	PRYSMIAN		
