= Nicolas Troussel =

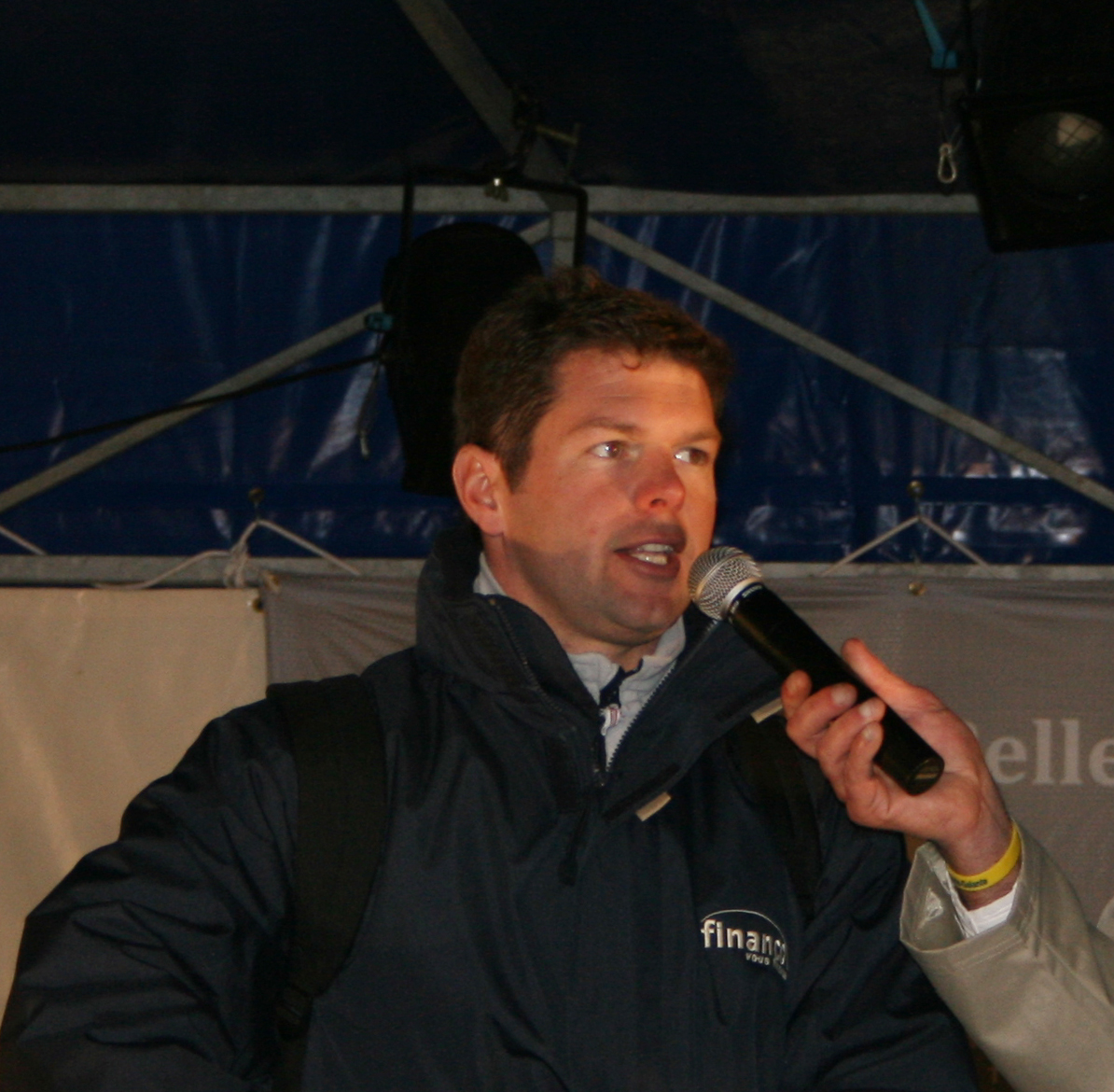

Personal information
- Nationality: French
- Born: 11 May 1974 (age 52) Nantes

Sailing career
- Sport: Sailing
- Class: IMOCA 60

Nicolas Troussel is a French professional offshore sailor born on 11 May 1974 in Morlaix (Finistère). He has twice won the Solitaire du Figaro, in 2006 and 2008.

== Career highlights ==
| Pos | Year | Race | Class | Boat name | Notes | Ref |
Round the world races
| DNF | 2020 | 2020-2021 Vendee Globe | IMOCA 60 | Corum (2020) | | |
Transatlantic Races
| 13th | 2019 | Transat Jacques Vabre | IMOCA 60 | | | |
| RET | 2018 | Route du Rhum | Class40 | | | |
| 2nd | 2014 | Route du Rhum | | | | |
| 1st | 2008 | Solitaire du Figaro | Beneteau Figaro 2 | | | |
| 1st | 2007 | Transat BPE | | | | |
| 1st | 2006 | Solitaire du Figaro | Beneteau Figaro 2 | | | |
| 1st | 2004 | Transat AG2R | Beneteau Figaro | | | |
Others
| 12 | 2019 | Défi Azimut | | | | |
| 1 | 2018 | Round Ireland Race | Class 40 | 155 - Corum | | |
| | 2002-2016 | Tour de Voile | | | | |
| | 2005 | Spi Ouest | | | | |
| 1 | 1998 | Solitaire du Télégramme | | | | |
| 1 | 1995 | Spi Ouest | | | | |

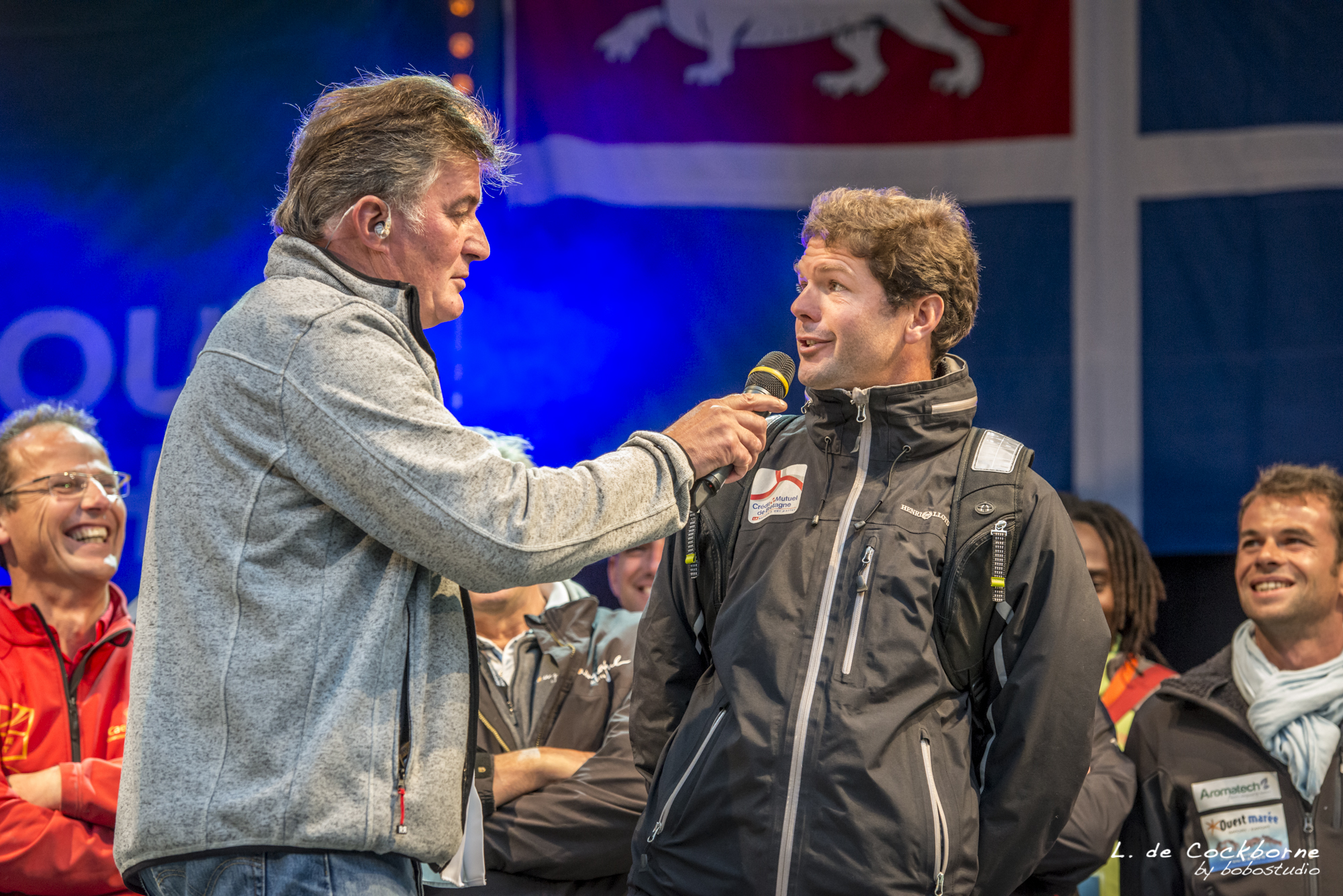
2014 Route du Rhum

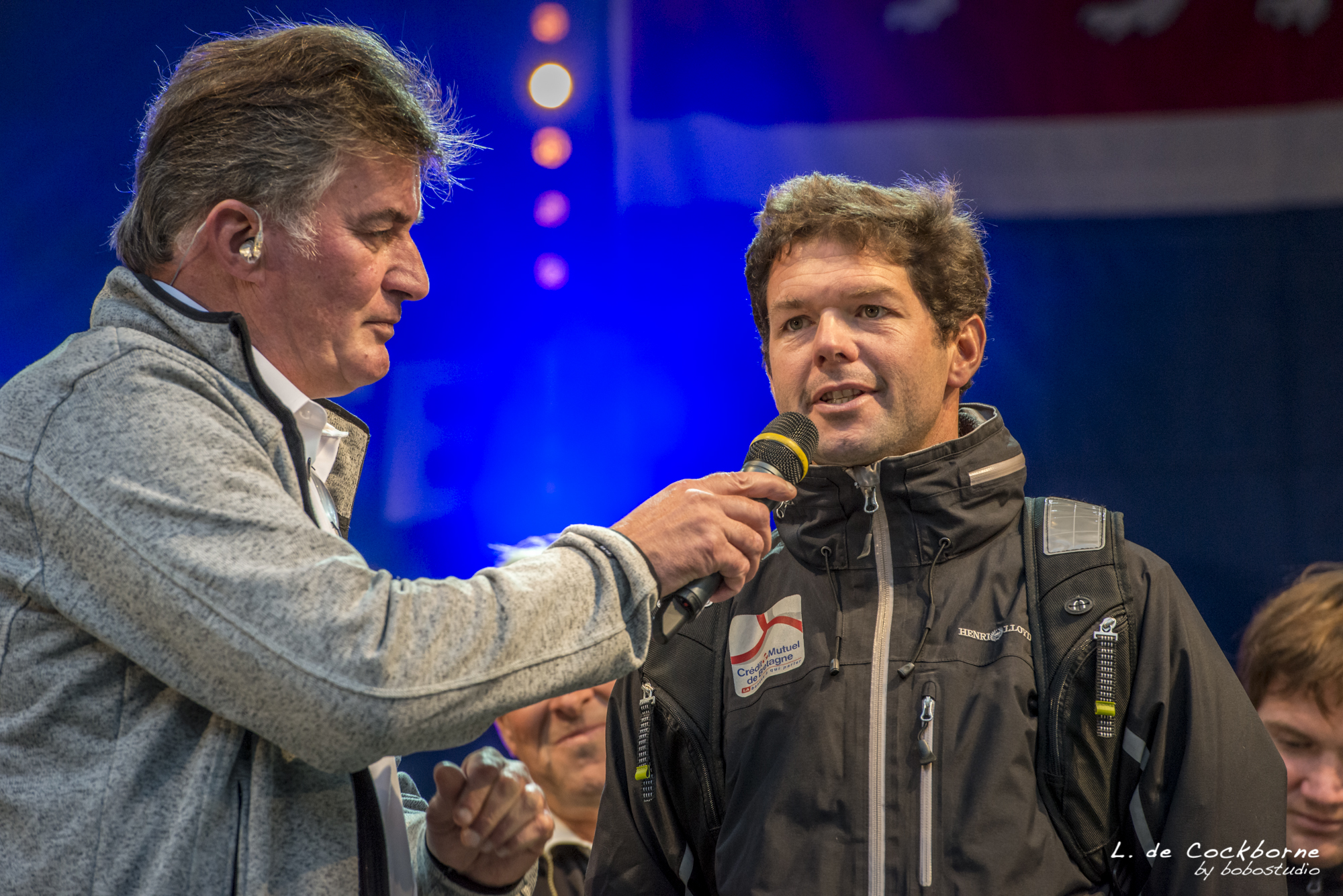
2014 Route du Rhum

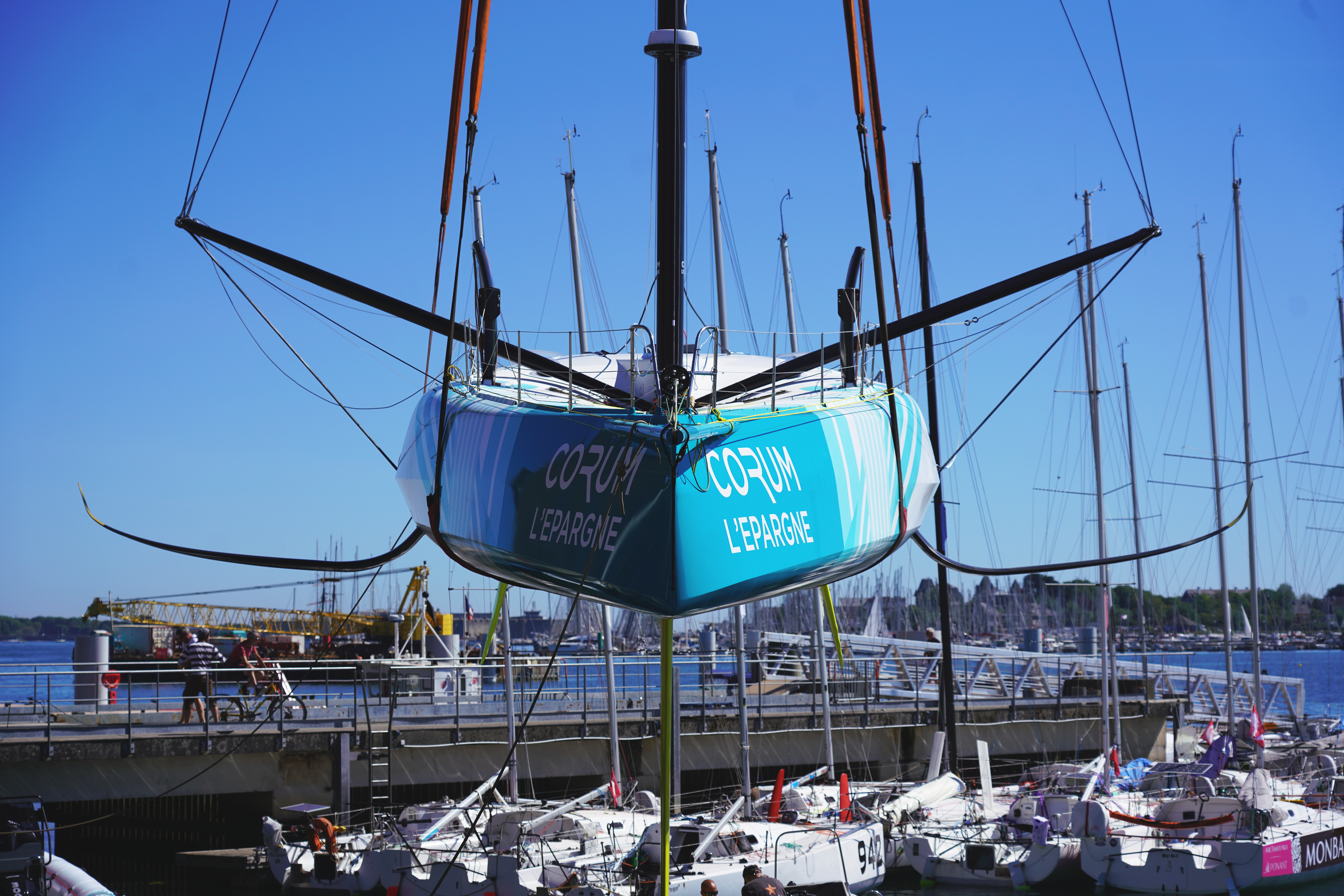
2020 Vendee Globe Boat
