= Clément Giraud =

French sailor

Personal information
- Nationality: (France) French
- Born: 11 December 1980 (age 45)

Sailing career
- Sport: Sailing
- Class(es): IMOCA 60, Multihull, Monohull

Clément Giraud (born 11 December 1980) is a French professional offshore sailor.

== Biography ==
Clement lived until his 18th birthday in the Caribbean on the Island of Martinique, where did lots of recreational sailing without ever joining a sailing club. He moved to France living and working on sailing boat in Mandelieu, and then raced semi-professionally, participating four times in the Tour de France à la voile.

He has competed in 129 regattas and races, in multihulls and monohulls, racing globally with more than 25 victories and 40 podiums and 135,000 miles covered onboard which includes 20,000 in double handed and 22,000 solo before he competed in the 2020–2021 Vendée Globe the pinnacle of Solo Oceanic Offshore racing. He had a difficult build up to the Vendee Globe with a fire starting on his boat hours before a qualifying race leading to him borrowing a boat from Erik Nigon for the race.

== Results ==
| Pos | Year | Race | Class | Boat name | Notes | Ref |
|---|---|---|---|---|---|---|
| 21 | 2020 | 2020–2021 Vendée Globe | IMOCA 60 | Compagnie Du Lit / Jiliti | None Stop Round the World in 99d 20h 08m 31s | |
| 16 | 2020 | Vendée-Arctique-Les Sables d'Olonne | IMOCA 60 | LA MIE CALINE - ARTISANS ARTIPOLE | Solo | |
| 8 | 2019 | Bermudes 1000 Race | IMOCA 60 | ENVOL BY FORTIL | Solo | |
| 11 | 2013 | Tour de France à la Voile | M34 | MARTINIQUE - BE.BRUSSELS | Crewed | |
| 11 | 2012 | Tour de France à la Voile | M34 | MARTINIQUE MEDIABAT | Crewed | |
| 8 | 2010 | Farr 30 World Championships | Farr 30 | | Crewed | |
| 3 | 2010 | Tour de France à la Voile | Farr 30 | | Crewed | |
| 2 | 2009 | Tour de France à la Voile | Farr 30 | | Crewed | |
| | 2009 | America's Cup World Series | | | | |
| | 2007 | North Pole Expedition 2009 | | | | |
| 11 | 2005 | Mini Transat Race | Mini Transat 6.50 | | | Solo |
