= Sébastien Destremau =

French sailor and sailing journalist

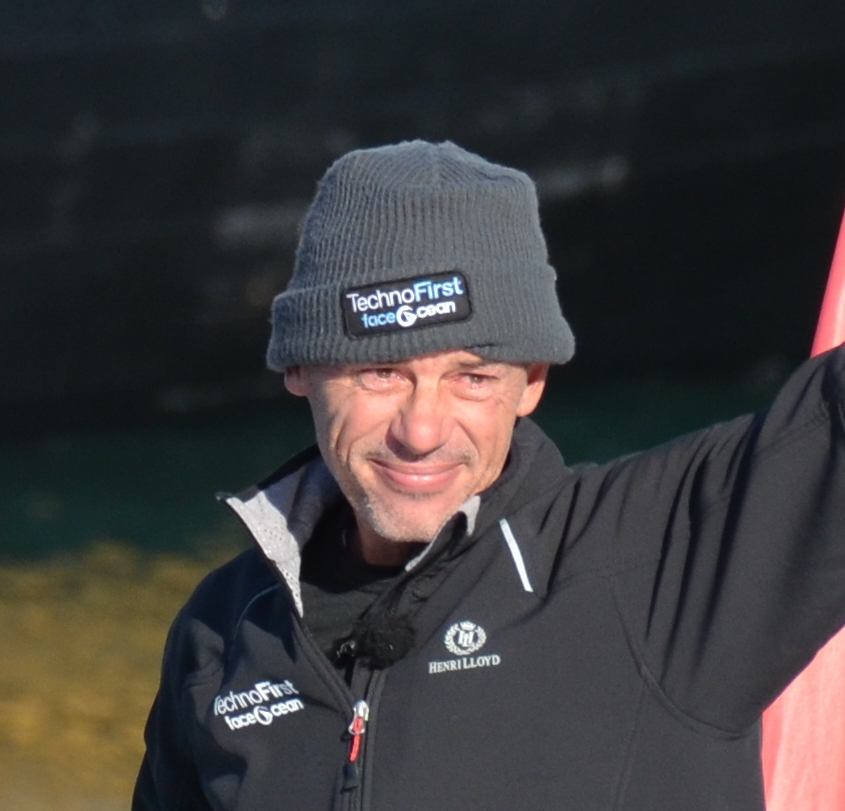

Personal information
- Nationality: France; Australia
- Born: 24 August 1964 (age 61) Plancoët, Côtes d'Armor, France

Sailing career
- Sport: Sailing
- Class: Mumm 36

Sébastien Destremau (born 24 August 1964 in Plancoët, Côtes d'Armor) is a professional sailor and sailing journalist of both French and Australian nationality.

== Career ==
A veteran with five America's Cup campaigns, multiple world championships and several campaigns in the Olympic classes. He then moved on to Oceanic sailing competing in the 2016-2017 Vendee Globe and the 2020–2021 Vendée Globe.

== Significant results ==
General References
Year	Pos.	Event	Class	Boat name	Notes	Ref.
2021	DNF	2020-2021 Vendee Globe	IMOCA 60		retired unaided to Christchurch	
2018	2	Route du Rhum	IMOCA 60			
2016-17	18	2016-2017 Vendée Globe	IMOCA 60	TECHNOFIRST - FACEOCEAN		
2016	1	Calero Solo Transat				
1998		Volvo Ocean Race				
1997-98	1	Rolex Sydney to Hobart Race				
1996	1	Mumm 36 World Championship				
1996	1	Tour de France à la voile		Edouard Leclerc - Région SCASO		
1990	29	Flying Dutchman World Championship	Flying Dutchman	FRA 195	crew for Hugues Destremau	

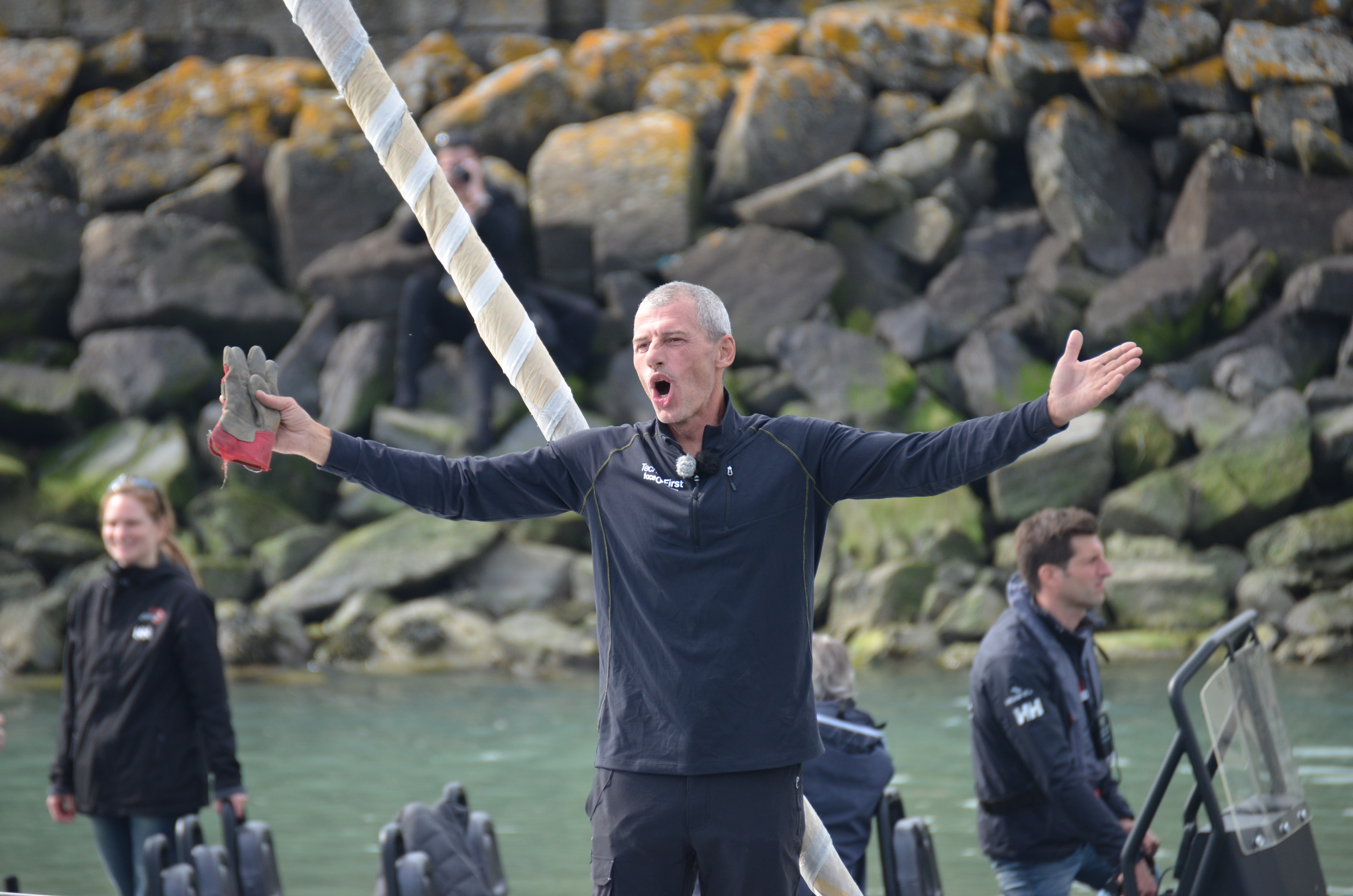

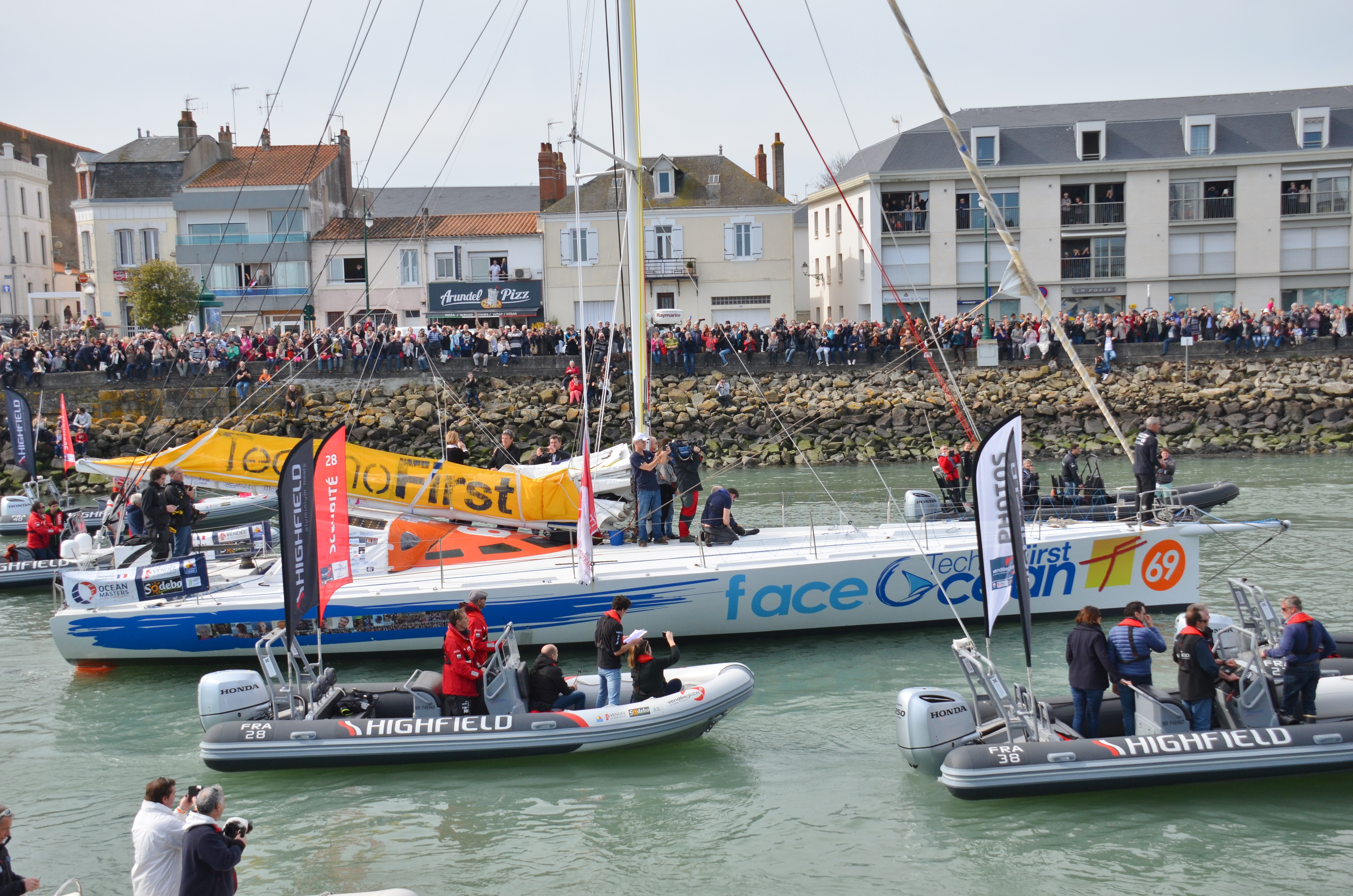

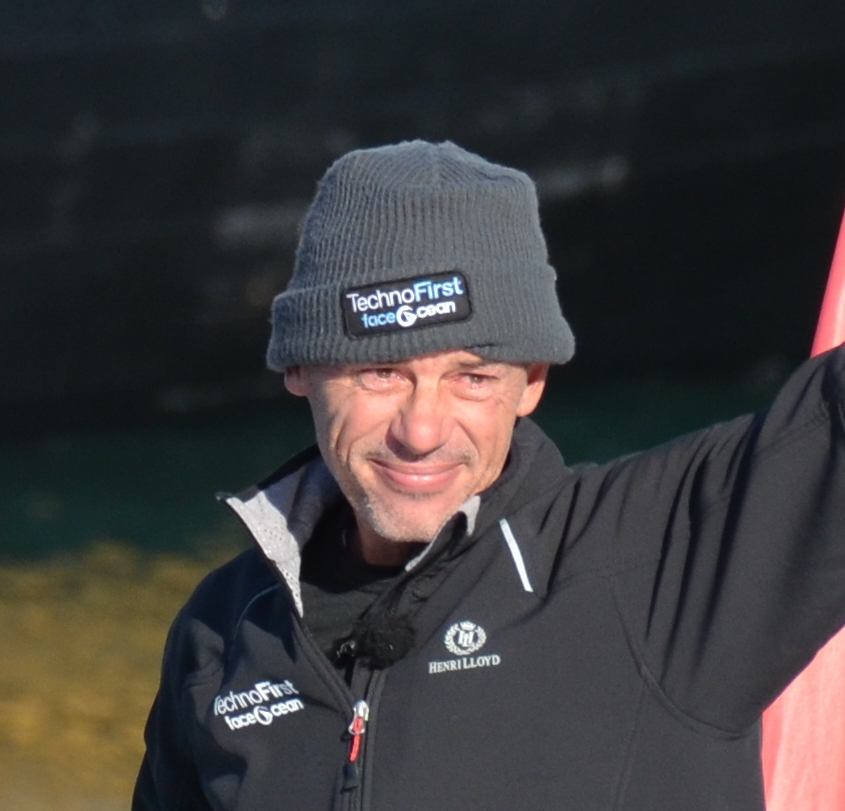

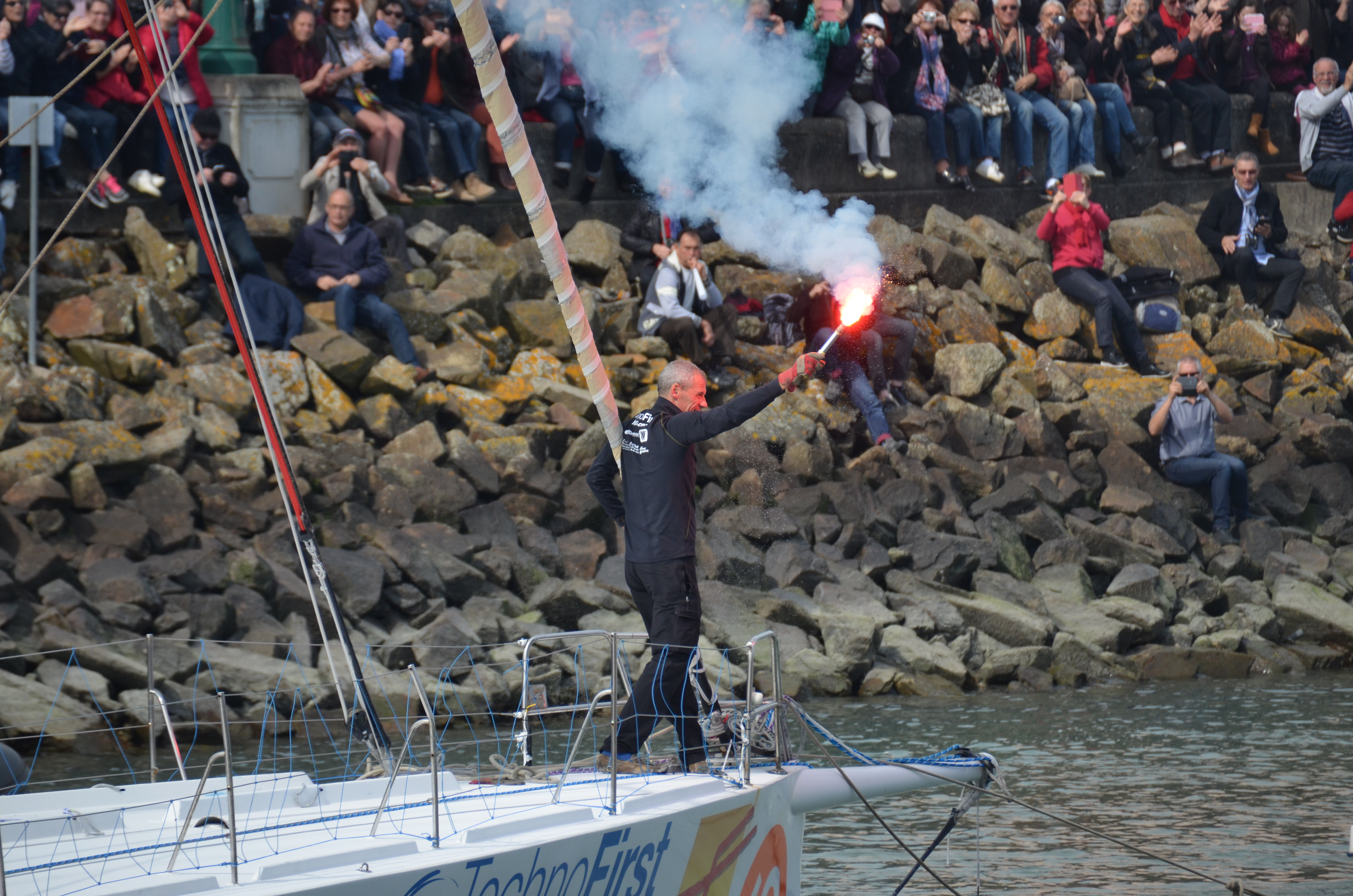

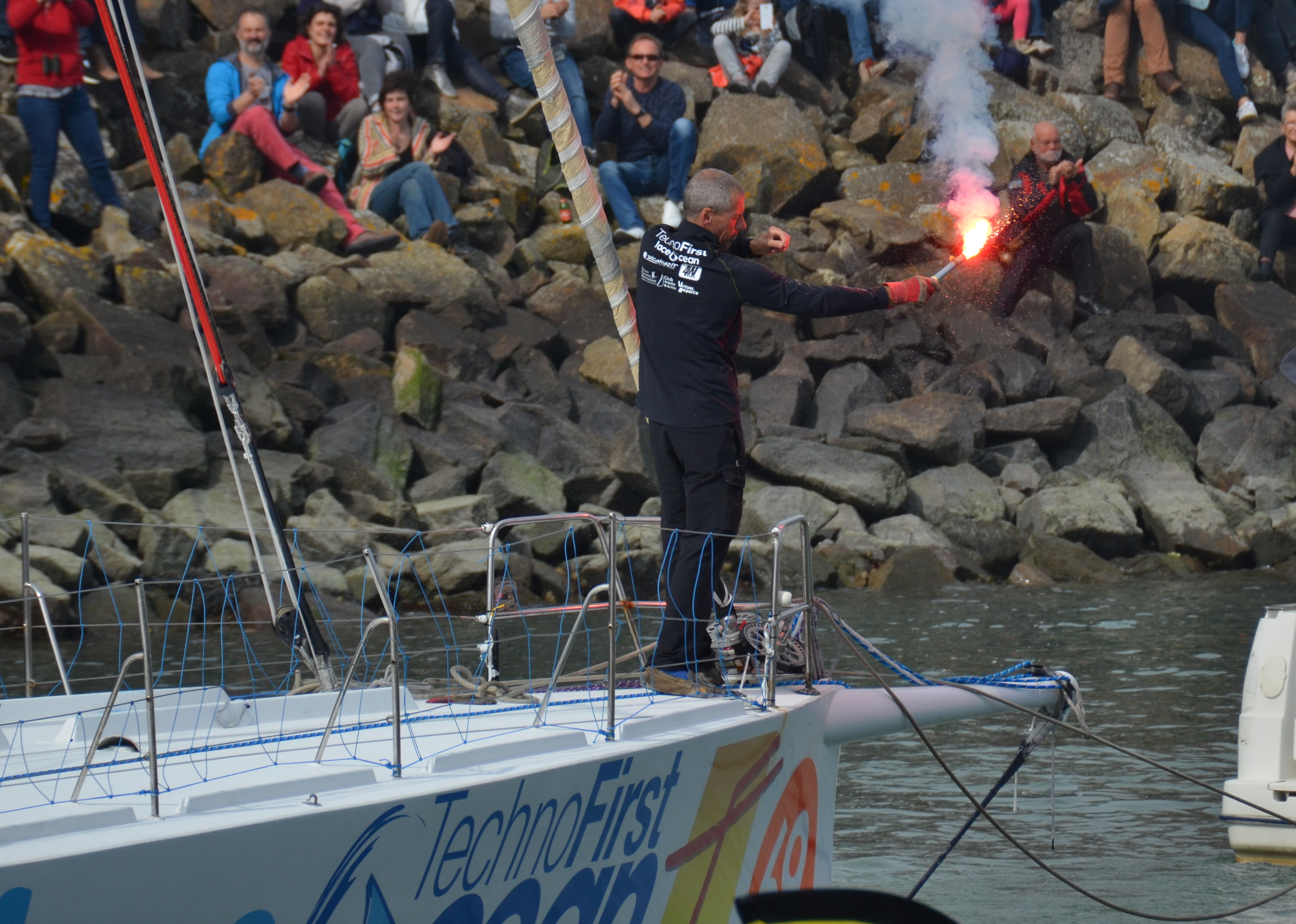

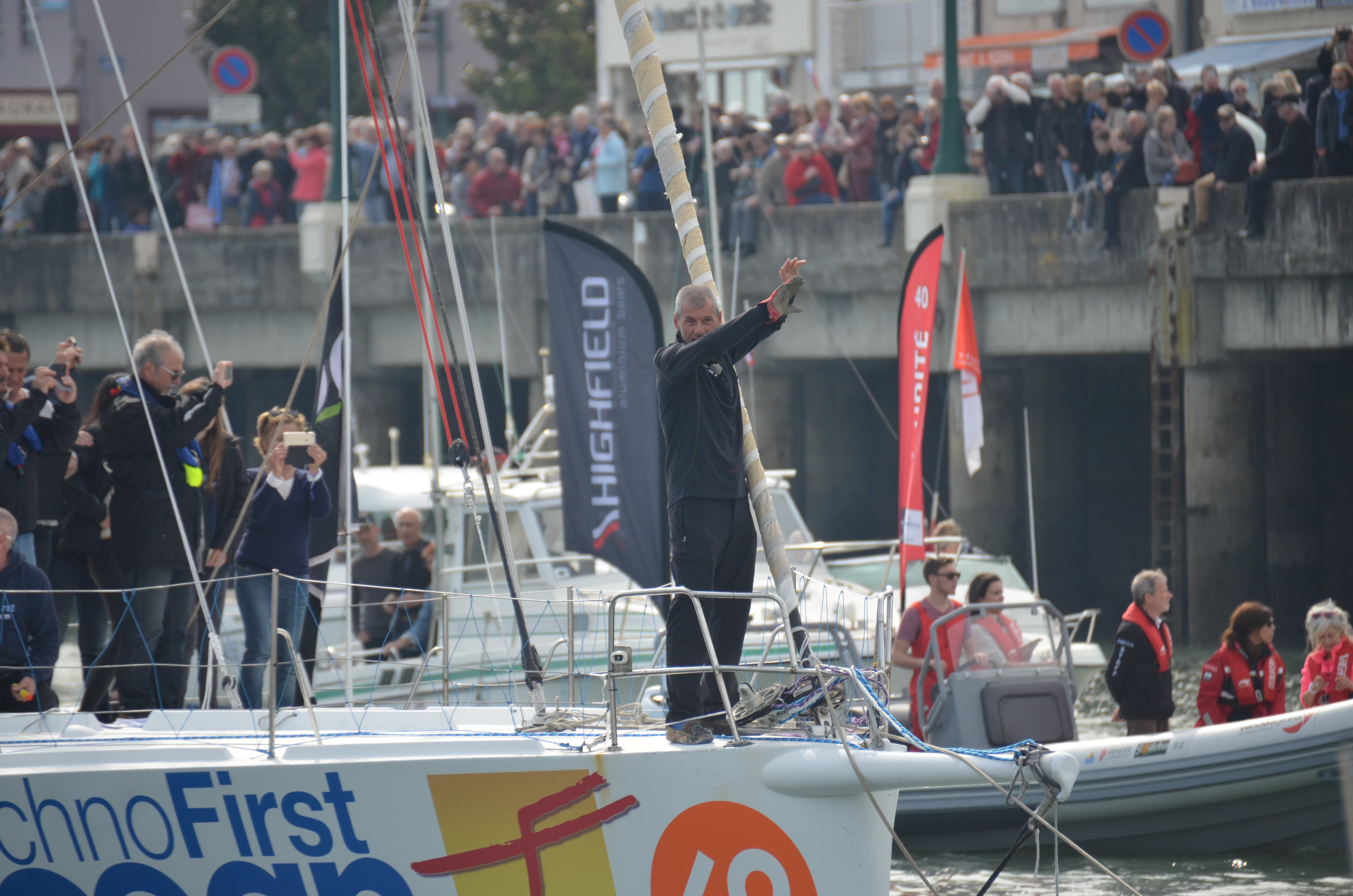

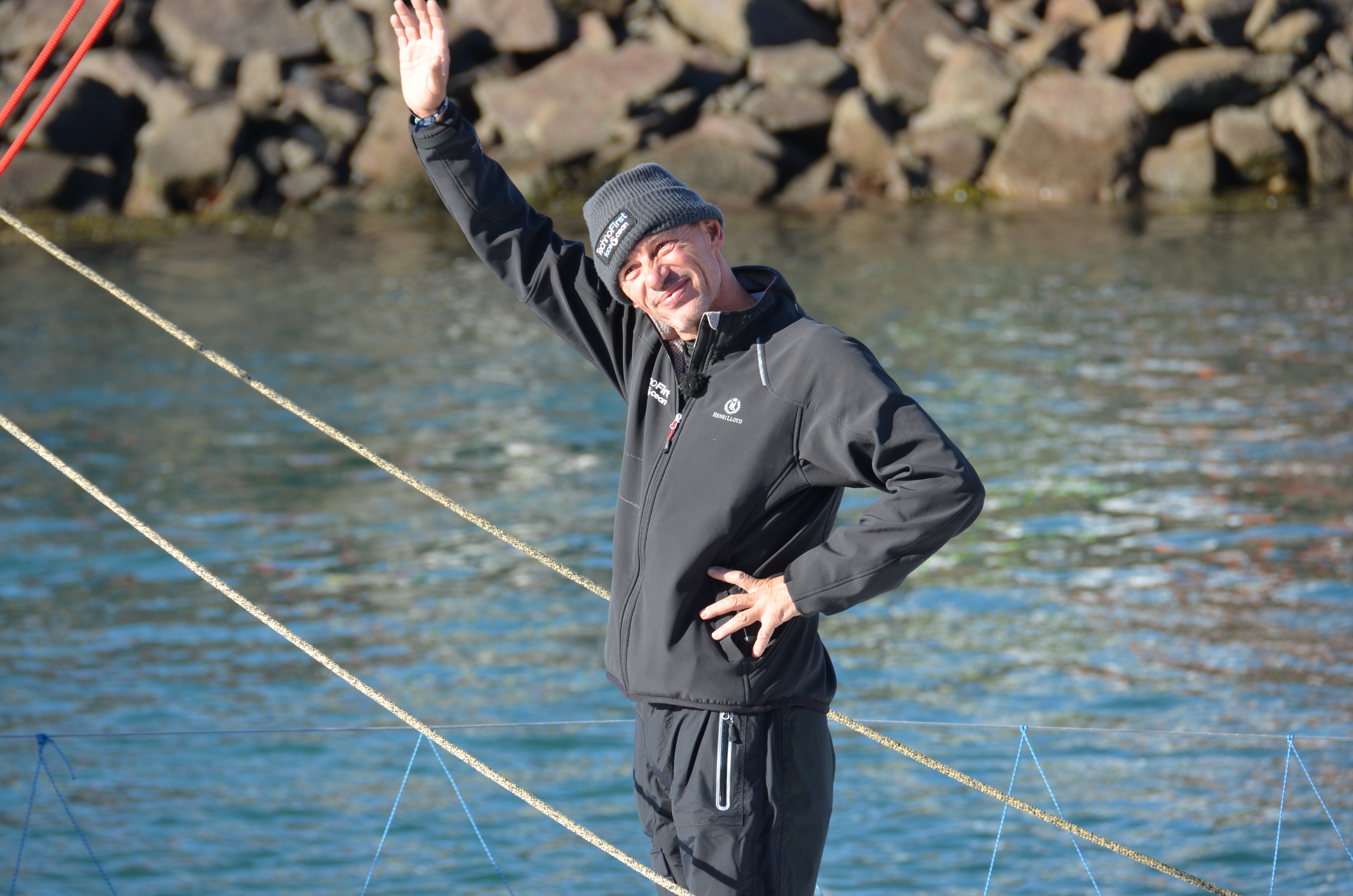

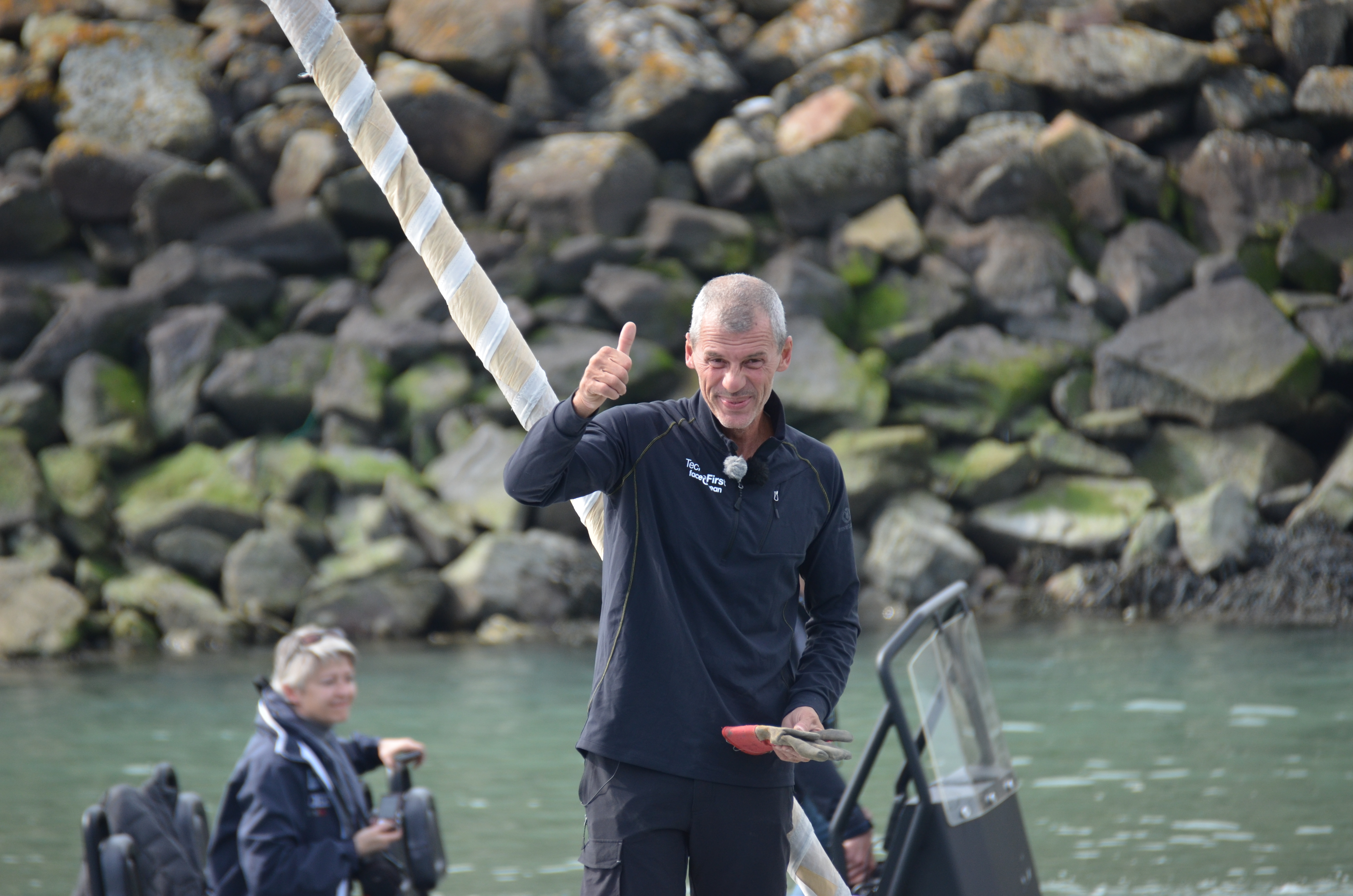

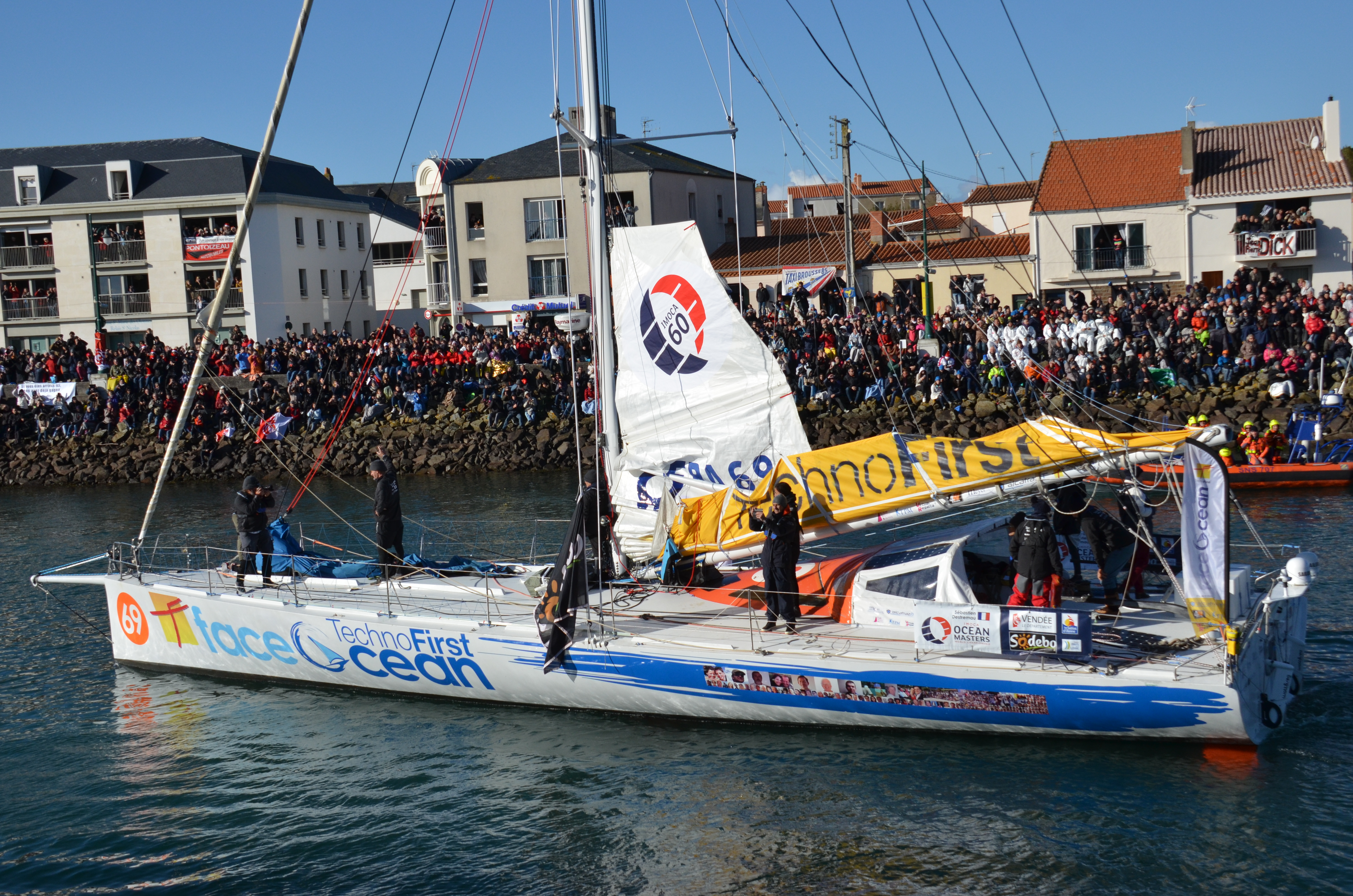

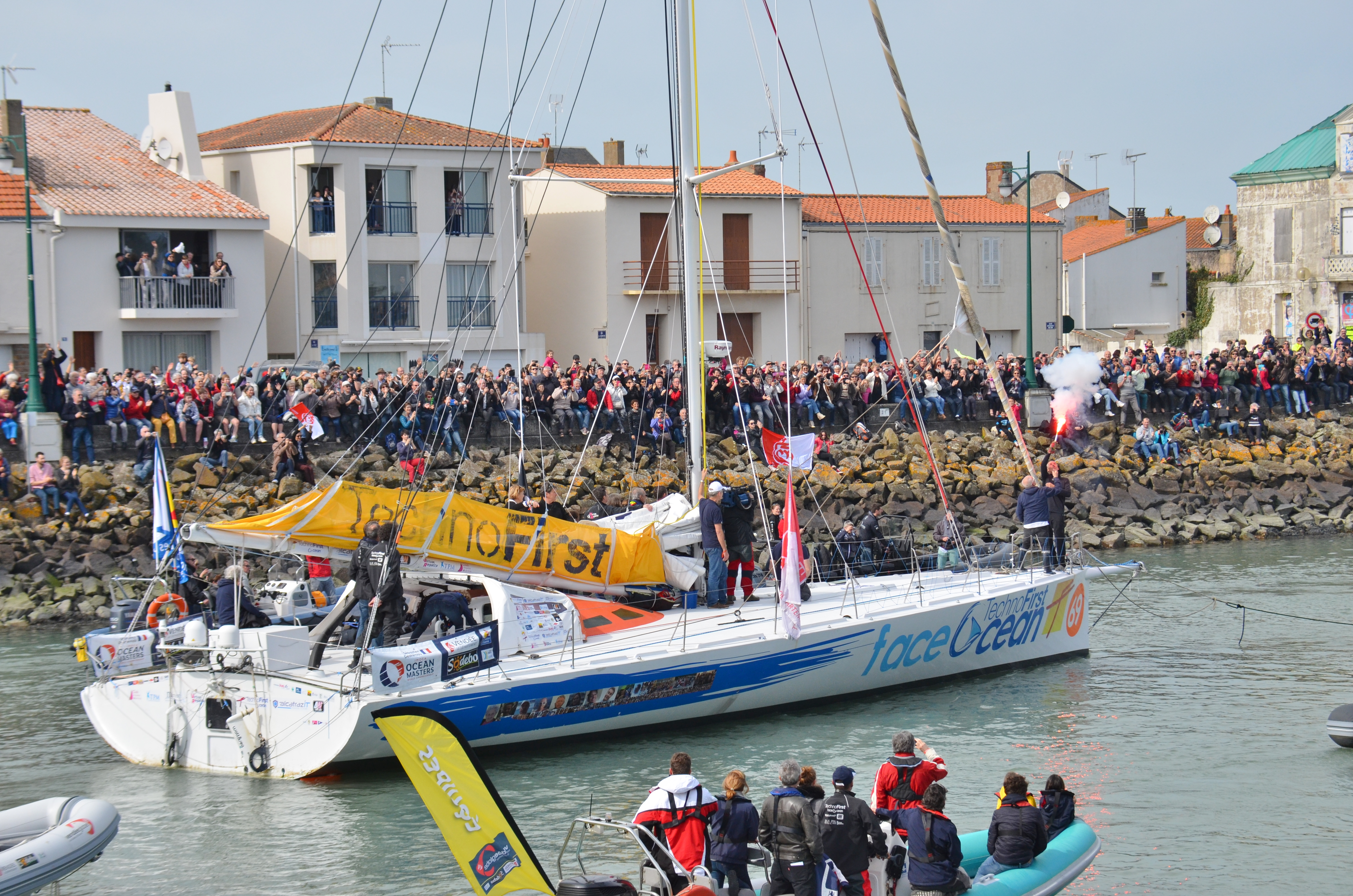

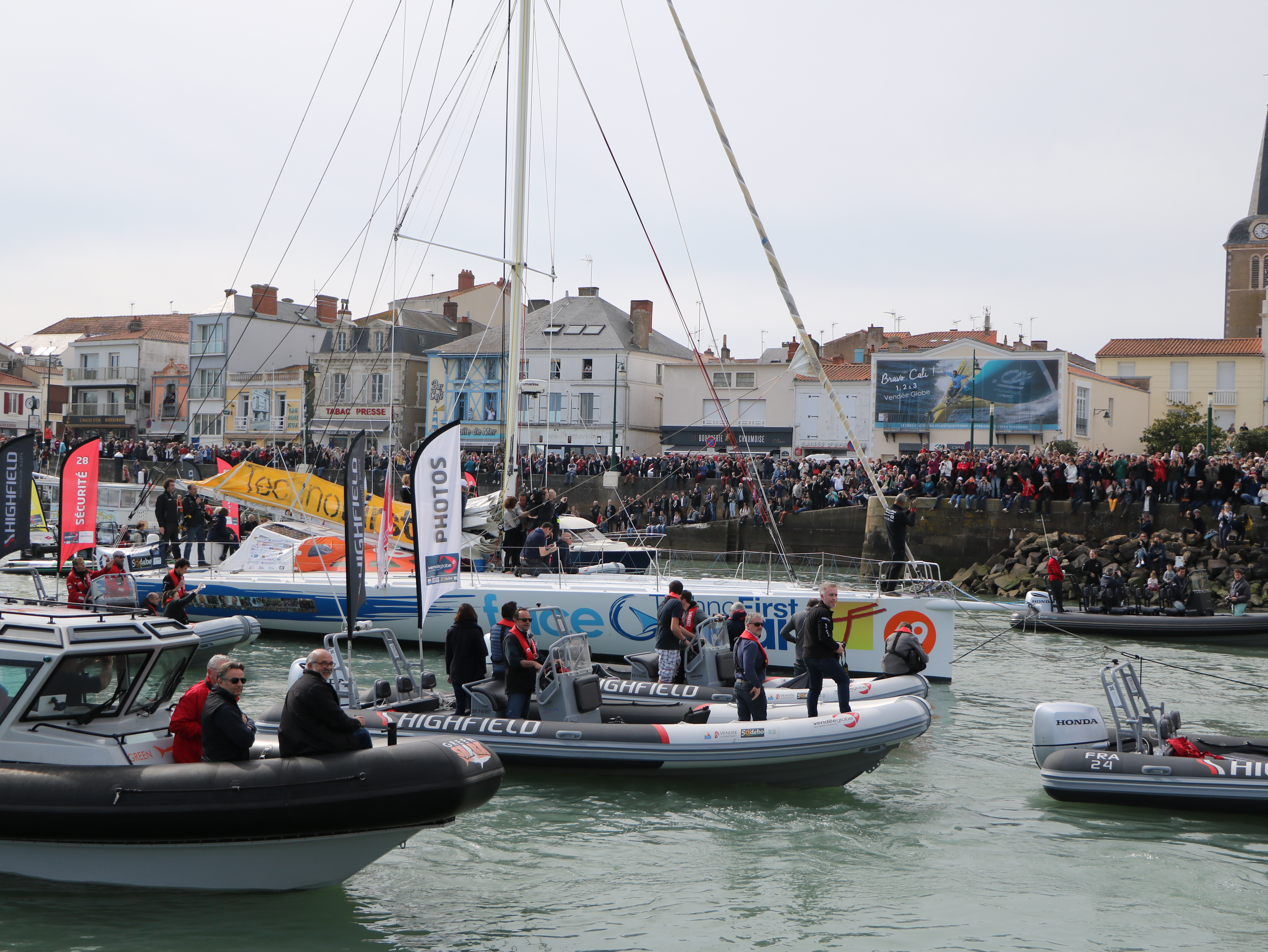
2016 Vendee Globe Arrival

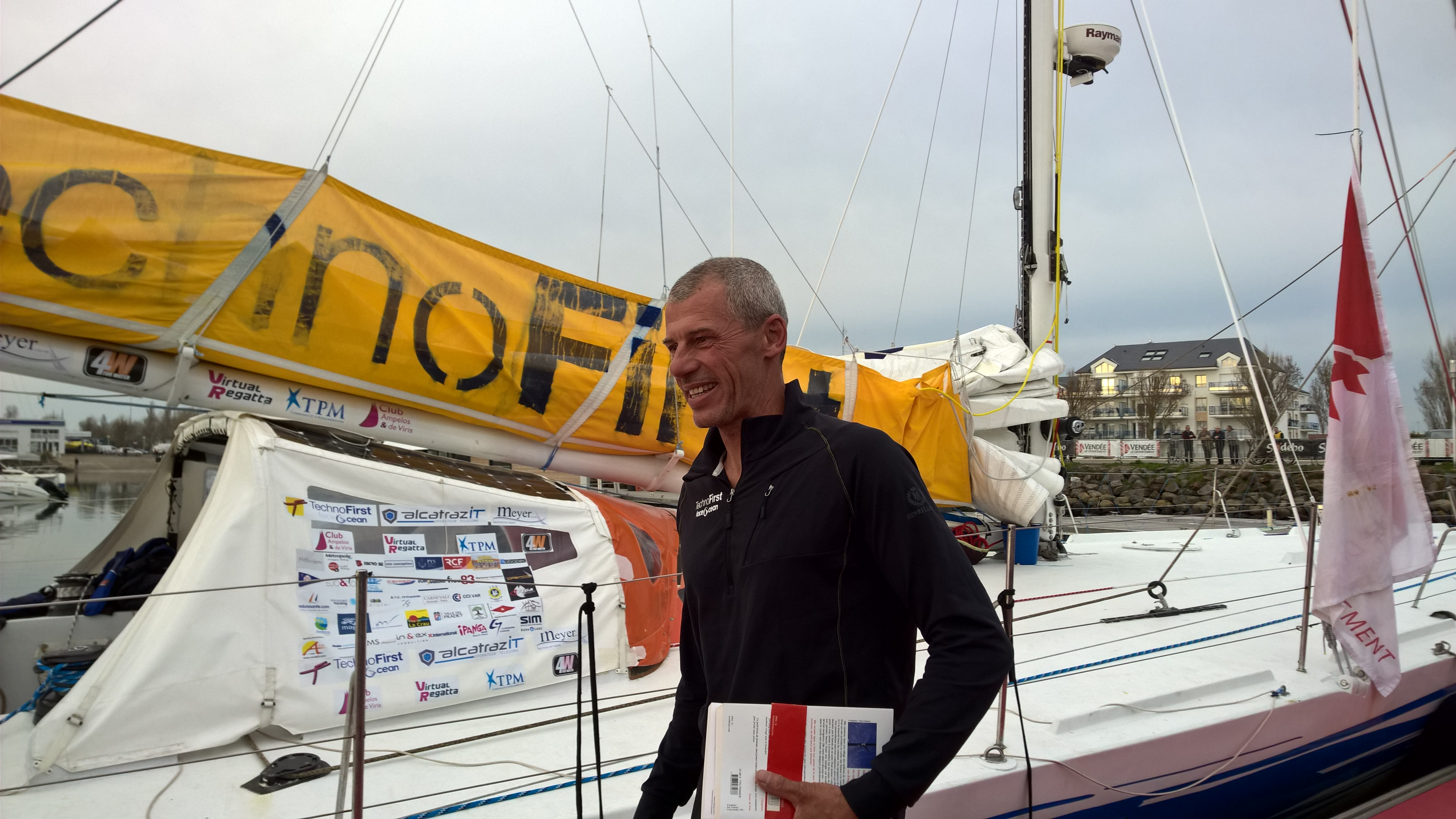
2016 Vendee Globe Arrival

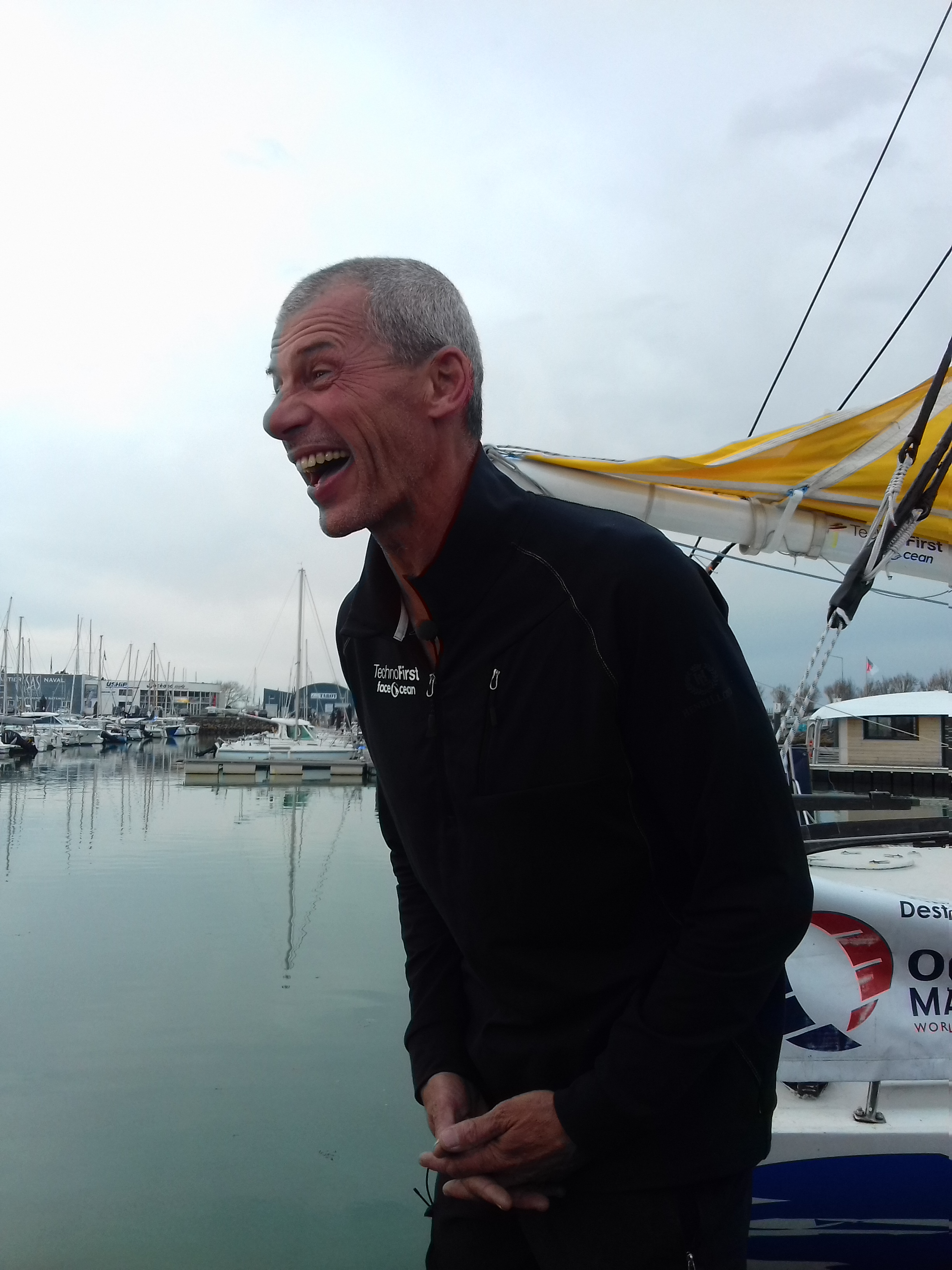
2016 Vendee Globe Arrival

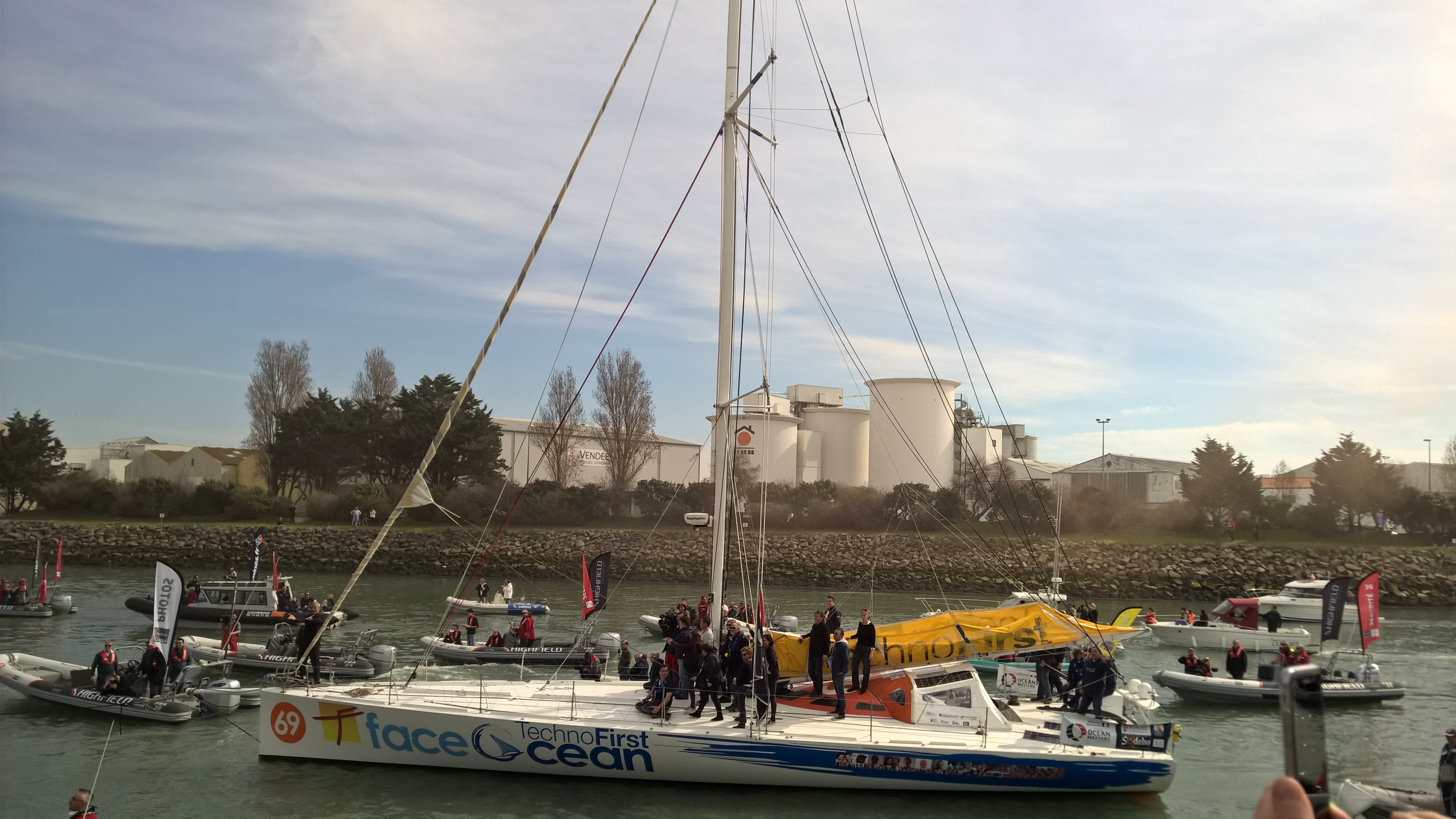
2016 Vendee Globe Arrival

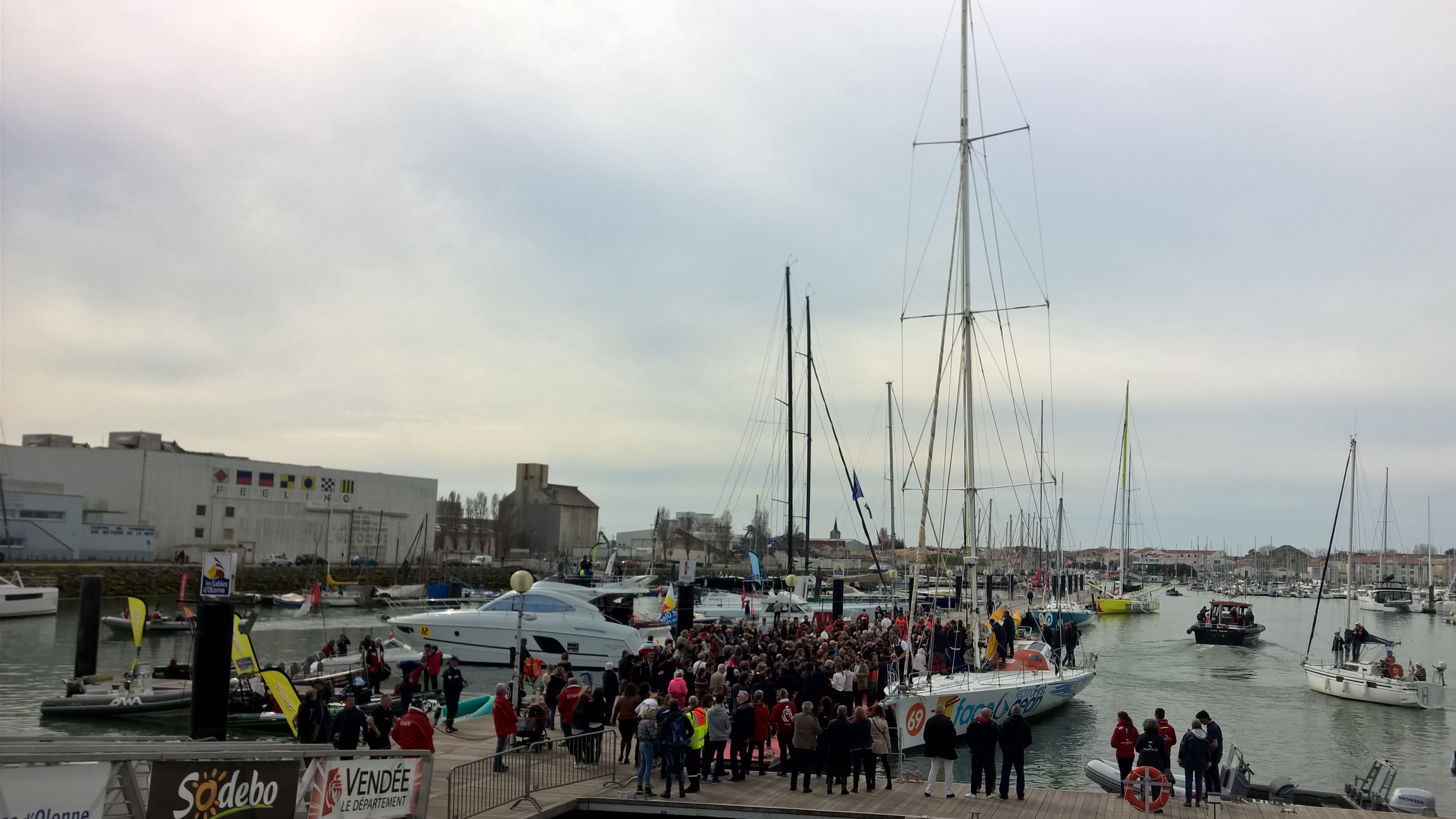
2016 Vendee Globe Arrival
