= Swan 55CC Frers =

Sailboat class

Development
- Designer: Germán Frers
- Location: Finland
- Year: 1990
- No. built: 22
- Builder: Oy Nautor AB
- Role: Cruiser
- Name: Swan 55CC Frers

Boat
- Displacement: 52,000 lb (23,587 kg)
- Draft: 8.50 ft (2.59 m)

Hull
- Type: monohull
- Construction: glassfibre
- LOA: 54.98 ft (16.76 m)
- LWL: 42.87 ft (13.07 m)
- Beam: 15.92 ft (4.85 m)
- Engine: Perkins Engines 116 hp (87 kW) diesel engine

Hull appendages
- Keel: Fin keel
- Ballast: 19,900 lb (9,026 kg)
- Rudder: Spade-type rudder

Rig
- Rig type: Bermuda rig
- I foretriangle height: 62.00 ft (18.90 m)
- J foretriangle base: 20.30 ft (6.19 m)
- P mainsail luff: 50.50 ft (15.39 m)
- E mainsail foot: 20.50 ft (6.25 m)

Sails
- Sailplan: Masthead sloop
- Mainsail area: 517.63 sq ft (48.089 m^{2})
- Jib/genoa area: 629.30 sq ft (58.464 m^{2})
- Total sail area: 1,146.93 sq ft (106.553 m^{2})

Racing
- PHRF: 63

The Swan 55CC Frers, also called the Swan 55-2, is a Finnish sailboat that was designed by Germán Frers as a cruiser and first built in 1990.

The design was originally marketed by the manufacturer as the Swan 55, but is now usually referred to as the Swan 53CC Frers after its centre cockpit configuration, or the Swan 55-2, to differentiate it from the unrelated 1970 Swan 55 and 2021 Swan 55 Frers designs.

The Swan 55CC Frers was developed into the Swan 57CC Frers, with the addition of a reverse transom.

== Production ==
The design was built by Oy Nautor AB in Finland, from 1990 to 1997 with 22 boats completed, but it is now out of production.

== Design ==
The Swan 55CC Frers is a recreational keelboat, built predominantly of glassfibre, with wood trim. It has a masthead sloop rig, a centre cockpit, a raked stem, an angled transom, an internally mounted spade-type rudder controlled by a wheel and a fixed fin keel or optional deep-draft keel. It displaces 52,000 lb (23,587 kg) and carries 19,900 lb (9,026 kg) of lead ballast.

The design has sleeping accommodation for six people, with a double "V"-berth in the bow cabin, two bunk beds in the forward cabin, an L-shaped settee and a straight settee in the main cabin and an aft cabin with a double berth on the starboard side. The galley is located on the port side just aft of the companionway ladder. The galley is of straight configuration and is equipped with a four-burner stove, an ice box and a sink. A navigation station is opposite the galley, on the starboard side. There are two heads, one just aft of the bow cabin on the starboard side and one on the starboard side, aft.

== Variants ==
Swan 55CC Frers
This model was introduced in 1990 and built until 1997, with 22 boats completed. It has a length overall of 54.98 ft (16.8 m), a waterline length of 42.87 ft (13.1 m), displaces 52,000 lb (23,587 kg) and carries 19,900 lb (9,026 kg) of lead ballast. The boat has a draft of 8.50 ft (2.59 m) with the standard keel and 10.83 ft (3.30 m) with the optional deep draft keel. The boat is fitted with a British Perkins Engines diesel engine of 116 hp (87 kW) for docking and manoeuvring. The fuel tank holds 163 U.S. gallons (620 L; 136 imp gal) and the fresh water tank has a capacity of 232 U.S. gallons (880 L; 193 imp gal). The design has a hull speed of 8.77 kn (16.24 km/h) and a PHRF handicap of 63.
Swan 57CC Frers
This model with an extended reverse transom was built from 1990 to 1997, with five boats completed. It has a length overall of 57.00 ft (17.4 m), a waterline length of 42.87 ft (13.1 m), displaces 50,030 lb (22,693 kg) and carries 19,910 lb (9,031 kg) of lead ballast. The boat has a draft of 7.20 ft (2.19 m) with the standard fin keel. British Perkins Engines M135 Sabre diesel engine of 135 hp (101 kW) for docking and manoeuvring. The fuel tank holds 164 U.S. gallons (620 L; 137 imp gal) and the fresh water tank has a capacity of 232 U.S. gallons (880 L; 193 imp gal). The design has a hull speed of 8.77 kn (16.24 km/h).

== See also ==
- List of sailing boat types
