= Swan 55 Frers =

Sailboat class

Development
- Designer: Germán Frers; Misa Poggi
- Location: Finland
- Year: 2021
- Builder: Oy Nautor AB
- Role: Cruiser-Racer
- Name: Swan 55 Frers

Boat
- Displacement: 49,493.78 lb (22,450 kg)
- Draft: 8.20 ft (2.50 m)

Hull
- Type: monohull
- Construction: glassfibre
- LOA: 58.23 ft (17.75 m)
- LOH: 54.46 ft (16.60 m)
- LWL: 51.77 ft (15.78 m)
- Beam: 16.40 ft (5.00 m)
- Engine: Yanmar 4JH110CR 110 hp (82 kW) diesel engine

Hull appendages
- Keel: Fin keel
- Ballast: 16,600.81 lb (7,530 kg)
- Rudder: Dual spade-type rudders

Rig
- Rig type: Bermuda rig
- I foretriangle height: 76.18 ft (23.22 m)
- J foretriangle base: 22.08 ft (6.73 m)
- P mainsail luff: 72.83 ft (22.20 m)
- E mainsail foot: 22.97 ft (7.00 m)

Sails
- Sailplan: Fractional rigged sloop
- Mainsail area: 1,024 sq ft (95.1 m^{2})
- Jib/genoa area: 862 sq ft (80.1 m^{2})
- Gennaker area: 2,960 sq ft (275 m^{2})
- Total sail area: 1,677.48 sq ft (155.843 m^{2})

The Swan 55 Frers is a Finnish sailboat that was designed by Germán Frers as a blue water cruiser-racer and first built in 2021. The interior design is by Misa Poggi.

The design is marketed by the manufacturer as the Swan 55, but is usually referred to as the Swan 55 Frers to differentiate it from the unrelated 1970 Swan 55 Sparkman & Stephens design and 1990 Swan 55CC Frers design.

== Production ==
The design has been built by Oy Nautor AB in Finland, since 2021. As of 2023 it remained in production.

== Design ==
The Swan 55 Frers is a recreational keelboat, built predominantly of glassfibre, with wood trim. It has a fractional sloop rig, with three sets of swept spreaders and a bowsprit. The hull has a plumb stem, a reverse transom with a drop-down tailgate swimming platform and dual internally mounted spade-type rudders controlled by dual wheels. It has a number of keel options, including a fin keel, shoal-draft keel, "performance" deep draft keel or stub keel and retractable centreboard. It displaces 49,493.78 lb (22,450 kg) and carries 16,600.81 lb (7,530 kg) of ballast.

The standard fin keel-equipped version of the boat has a draft of 8.20 ft (2.50 m), the shoal draft keel version has a draft of 6.89 ft (2.10 m), the deep keel version has a draft of 11.15 ft (3.40 m), while the centerboard-equipped version has a draft of 9.35 ft (2.85 m) with the centerboard extended and 6.56 ft (2.00 m) with it retracted, allowing operation in shallow water.

The boat is fitted with a Japanese Yanmar 4JH110CR diesel engine of 110 hp (82 kW) for docking and manoeuvring. The fuel tank holds 211 U.S. gallons (800 L; 176 imp gal) and the fresh water tank has a capacity of 159 U.S. gallons (600 L; 132 imp gal).

The design has sleeping accommodation for six people, with a double "V"-berth in the bow cabin, a double berth in the forward cabin, a U-shaped settee and a straight settee in the main cabin and an aft cabin with a double berth on the starboard side. The galley is located on the port side at the companionway ladder. The galley is L-shaped and is equipped with a four-burner stove, an ice box and a double sink. There are three heads, one in the bow cabin on the starboard side, one just aft of that and one on the starboard side in the aft cabin.

For sailing downwind the design may be equipped with a gennaker of 2,960 sq ft (275 m^{2}).

The design has a hull speed of 9.64 kn (17.85 km/h).

== Operational history ==
In a 2021 Yachting World introductory review, Rupert Holmes noted, "two versions of the Swan 55 will be offered – a standard cruising model and a performance variant with a square-top mainsail. This will clearly be an attractive option for those planning to race the boat, whether in one of Nautor’s own events, or in iconic regattas and offshore races around the world."

In a 2021 introductory Nautic Magazine review, Andrei Dragos wrote, "she will be a pleasant yacht to sail, easy to handle and cruise in its standard version and race in its performance set up version, which includes a square to mainsail and a bowsprit for the light weather and downwind sails."

In a 2023 review for Yachting World, Toby Hodges wrote, "the Swan 55 has a modern, beamy hull form, albeit combined with some of that deep V hull which helped make the 54 seaworthy. It also has a lower style fixed bowsprit and a completely new beach club transom design which opens and extends out on rams to create a massive bathing platform as well as revealing a lazarette and tender garage for a 2.5m RIB."

== See also ==
- List of sailing boat types
