= 2023 Fastnet Race =

2023 biennial yacht race in Great Britain and France

50th Fastnet Race
Event information
- Type: Yacht
- Dates: 22 – 29 July 2023
- Sponsor: Rolex
- Host city: Cowes, Cherbourg-en-Cotentin
- Boats: 430
- Distance: 695 nautical miles (1,287 km)
- Website: Rolex fastnet Race

Results
- Winner (2023): SVR Lazartigue (François Gabart) (Multihull); MACIF (Charlie Dalin) (Monohull)

Succession
- Previous: Maxi Edmond De Rothschild (Charles Caudrelier & Franck Cammas) (Multihull); Skorpios (Fernando Echavarri) (Monohull) in 2021
- Next: TBD (2025)

The 2023 Fastnet Race, sponsored by Rolex and hosted by the Royal Ocean Racing Club in Cowes, was the 50th running of the Fastnet Race. It begins off the Royal Yacht Squadron start line at Cowes on the Isle of Wight in England at 1 pm on 22 July 2023, before leaving the Solent through the Needles Channel as it follows the southern coastline of England westward down the English Channel, before rounding Land's End. After crossing the Celtic Sea, the race rounds the Fastnet Rock off the southwest coast of Ireland. Returning on a largely reciprocal eastward course, the race rounds the Isles of Scilly before crossing the finish line in Cherbourg-en-Cotentin, France.

A fleet of 430 boats were entered for the race, 424 started the race and 258 finished the race. Multihull Line Honours were claimed by SVR Lazartigue in a time of 1 day, 8 hours, 38 minutes and 27 seconds while the Monohull Line Honours were claimed by MACIF in a time of 2 days, 7 hours, 16 minutes and 26 seconds Caro (Max Klink) won the Fastnet Challenge Cup.

== Results ==
=== Multihull Line Honours ===
Pos	Division	Sail Number	Yacht	Country	Yacht Type	LOA (Metres)	Skipper	Elapsed time d:hh:mm:ss
1	Ultim 32/23	FRA 1	SVR Lazartigue	France	VPLP Ultim 32 Trimaran	32.00	François Gabart	1:08:38:27
2	Ultim 32/23	FRA 11	Banque Populaire XI	France	VPLP Ultim 32 Trimaran	32.00	Armel Le Cléac'h	1:09:36:43
3	MOCRA Multihull	FRA007	Zoulou	France	VPLP MOD70 Trimaran	21.20	Erik Maris	2:05:03:15
4	Ocean Fifty	35	Le Rire Médecin Lamotte	France	Verdier Ocean Fifty Trimaran	15.24	Luke Berry; Antoine Joubert	2:06:59:04
5	Ocean Fifty	FRA4	Viabilis	France	VPLP Ocean Fifty Trimaran	15.24	Pierre Quiroga; Justin Baradat	2:07:00:30
6	Ocean Fifty	FRA1000000	Petit Cœur de Beurre	France	VPLP Ocean Fifty Trimaran	15.24	Matthieu Perraut; Vincent Lancien	2:07:49:31
7	MOCRA Multihull	SUI888	Allegra	Switzerland	Irens 82 Catamaran	25.49	Adrian Keller; Rob Grimm	2:08:44:18
8	MOCRA Multihull	MHL6804	Tosca Gunboat	United States	VPLP Gunboat 68 Catamaran	20.75	Ken Howery; Neal McDonald	2:09:19:23
9	MOCRA Multihull	FRA82	Lodigroup	France	Barreau ORC50 Catamaran	15.80	Loïc Escoffier; Benoit Chapanhac	2:18:11:55
10	MOCRA Multihull	FRA888	Guyader Saveol	France	Barreau ORC50 Catamaran	15.80	Gwen Chapalain	3:11:04:19
11	MOCRA Multihull	2199	Morpheus	(United Kingdom) Great Britain	Shuttleworth 39 Trimaran	11.80	Andrew Fennell	4:04:16:13
12	MOCRA Multihull	IBV-21	Calamity	British Virgin Islands	Barreau ORC50 Catamaran	15.80	Kimmo Nordstrom	4:05:05:34
13	MOCRA Multihull	FRA7	Wellness Training	France	Barreau MG52 Catamaran	15.81	Marc Guillemot	4:06:05:37
DNF	MOCRA Multihull	101	Victorinox	France	KKG 58 Custom Catamaran	17.80	Jean-Francois Lilti; Clara Fortin	Retired
DNF	MOCRA Multihull	FRA17	Rayon Vert	France	Le Rouge Pulsar 50 Trimaran	15.24	Oren Nataf	Retired
DNF	MOCRA Multihull	GER8357	Nica	Germany	Hill Knierim 17.5 Catamaran	17.54	Gorm Gondesen	Retired
DNF	MOCRA Multihull	2235	Blackcap	France	Newick Echo II Extended Trimaran	11.85	Thierry Roger	Retired
DNF	MOCRA Multihull	FRA0	We Explore	France	VPLP Outremer 59X Catamaran	18.29	Roland Jourdain	Retired
DNF	MOCRA Multihull	FRA53255	Banzai	France	Barreau TS42 Catamaran	13.86	Vince Willemart	Retired
DNF	MOCRA Multihull	GBR815M	Slinky Malinki	(United Kingdom) Great Britain	Newton Dazcat 1295 Catamaran	12.97	James Holder	Retired
DNF	Ocean Fifty	29	French Touch Oceans Club	France	Irens-Cabaret Ocean Fifty Trimaran	15.24	Eric Péron; Laurent Bourguès	Retired
DNF	Ocean Fifty	120000	Solidaires En Peloton-ARSEP	France	Neyhousser Ocean Fifty Trimaran	15.24	Thibaut Vauchel-Camus; Quentin Vlamynck	Retired

=== Monohull Line Honours ===
Pos	Division	Yacht					Skipper	Elapsed time d:hh:mm:ss
Pos	Division	Sail No.	Name	Designer	Type	LOA (m)	Skipper	Elapsed time d:hh:mm:ss
1	IMOCA 60	FRA79	MACIF (2)	Verdier		18.28	Charlie Dalin (FRA); Pascal Bidegorry (FRA)	2:07:16:26
2	IMOCA 60	FRA24	Paprec Arkéa (6)	Koch-Finot		18.28	Yoann Richomme (FRA); Yann Elies (FRA)	2:07:20:32
3	IRC Super Zero	USA2872	Lucky	Juan-K	27m Canting Maxi	27.00	Bryon Ehrhart (USA)	2:07:31:26
4	IMOCA 60	FRA100	For The Planet	Verdier		18.28	Sam Goodchild (GBR); Antoine Koch (FRA)	2:07:43:19
5	IMOCA 60	FRA53	V and B-Monbana-Mayenne	Verdier	IMOCA 60	18.28	Maxime Sorel (FRA); Christopher Pratt (FRA)	2:07:58:24
6	IMOCA 60	FRA109	Initiatives Coeur (4)	Manuard	IMOCA 60	18.28	Sam Davies (GBR); Nicolas Lunven (FRA)	2:08:01:00
7	IMOCA 60	FRA15	L'Occitane en Provence (2)	Verdier		18.28	Clarisse Cremer (FRA); Alan Roberts (GBR)	2:08:01:31
8	IMOCA 60	FRA8	Teamwork	VPLP		18.28	Justine Mettraux (SUI); Julien Villion	2:08:24:03
9	IMOCA 60	17	Maitre CoQ V	Verdier		18.28	Yannick Bestaven (FRA); Julien Pulve	2:08:25:30
10	IRC Super Zero	NED1	Team Jajo	Farr	Volvo Ocean 65	20.37	Clarke Murphy (USA)	2:08:33:42
11	IMOCA 60	FRA-2	Bureau Vallée	Manuard	IMOCA 60	18.28	Louis Burton (FRA); Baptiste Hulin	2:08:42:59
12	IMOCA 60	FRA-10	Fortinet-Best Western	Verdier VPLP	IMOCA 60	18.28	Romain Atanasio (FRA); Gregory Gendron	2:09:02:41
13	IMOCA 60	27	MACSF	Verdier VPLP	IMOCA 60	18.28	Isabella Joschke (FRA); Pierre Brasseur	2:09:21:37
14	IMOCA 60	FRA-3	Charal	Manuard	IMOCA 60	18.28	Jérémie Beyou (FRA); Frank Cammas (FRA)	2:10:21:37 ^{1}
15	IMOCA 60	FRA-14	La Mie Câline	Verdier VPLP	IMOCA 60	18.28	Arnaud Boissieres (FRA); Gerald Veniard	2:10:25:35
16	IMOCA 60	ITA-34	Prysmian Group	Verdier VPLP	IMOCA 60	18.28	Giancarlo Pedote (ITA); Milan Kolacek	2:10:59:18
17	IRC Super Zero	POL-2	Wind Whisper	Farr	Volvo Ocean 65	20.37	Pablo Arrarte (POL)	2:10:59:44
18	IMOCA 60	FRA-30	Monnoyeur Duo for a Job	Verdier VPLP	IMOCA 60	18.28	Benjamin Ferre (FRA); Pierre Le Roy	2:12:05:29
19	IMOCA 60	FRA-1000	Lazare	Finot	IMOCA 60	18.28	Tanguy Le Turquais (FRA); Felix de Navacelle	2:12:50:20
20	IMOCA 60	SUI-7	Hublot	VPLP	IMOCA 60	18.28	Alan Roura (SUI); Simon Koster	2:14:27:27
21	IMOCA 60	JPN-11	DMG Mori Global One	VPLP	IMOCA 60	18.28	Kojiro Shiraishi (JPN); Tierry Duprey du Vorsent	2:16:35:08
22	IRC Zero	CAY52	Caro	Botin	TP52 Modified	15.90	Max Klink (SUI)	2:16:40:02
23	IMOCA 60	SUI-49	Oliver Herr Ocean Racing	Farr	IMOCA 60	18.28	Oliver Heer (SUI); David Ledroit	2:16:42:15
24	IMOCA 60	FRA-22	Freelance.com	Farr	IMOCA 60	18.28	Guirec Soudee (FRA); Lucie Queruel	2:17:04:55
25	IMOCA 60	FRA-83	Foussier-Mon Courtier Energie	Farr	IMOCA 60	18.28	Sébastien Marsset (FRA); Sophie Faguet	2:17:54:07
26	IRC Zero	USA-60564	Warrior Won	Judel Vrolijk	TP52	15.85	Chris Sheehan (USA)	2:18:41:38
27	IMOCA 60	172	Fives Group-Lantana Environnement	Farr	IMOCA 60	18.28	Louis Duc (FRA); Rémi Aubrun	2:19:33:38
28	IMOCA 60	FRA-71	Groupe Setin	Farr	IMOCA 60	18.28	Manuel Cousin (FRA); Clément Giraud	2:20:17:02
29	IRC Zero	FRA8668	Teasing Machine	Nivelt Muratet	NMYD 54	16.50	Eric de Turckheim (FRA)	3:09:01:08
30	IRC Zero	FIN1527R	Tulikettu	Welbourn	Infiniti	15.85	Arto Linnervuo (FIN)	3:09:50:03
31	IRC Zero	BEL-5012	Balthasar	Juan-K	ClubSwan 50 OD	15.24	Louis Balcaen (BEL)	3:10:07:55
32	IRC Zero	GBR-2747R	Ino Noir		Carkeek 45	13.70	James Neville (GBR)	3:10:11:05
33	IMOCA 60	GBR-88	Gentoo	Finot	IMOCA 60	18.28	James Harayda (GBR); Stéphane Le Diraison (FRA)	3:10:20:33
34	Class40	FRA177		Verdier	Pogo 40 S4	12.19	Erwan Le Draoulec (FRA); Julien Hereu (FRA)	3:10:22:02
35	IMOCA 60	HUN-23	New Europe	Clarke	IMOCA 60	18.28	Szabolcs Weöres (HUN); Nándor Fa (HUN)	3:10:28:51
36	IRC Super Zero	AUT1	Sisi-Kraken Travel x Austrian Ocean Racing	Farr	Volvo Ocean 65	20.37	Gerwin Jansen (AUT)	3:10:31:07
37	IRC Zero	NED20002	Boudragon	Farr	Volvo 60	19.38	Hans Bouscholte (NED)	3:10:33:21
38	Class40	FRA184	Dékuple	VPLP	Clak 40	12.19	William Mathelin-Moreaux (FRA); Pietro Luciani (FRA)	3:10:36:17
39	Class40	ITA193	Influence 2	Guelfi	Musa 40	12.19	Andrea Fornaro (ITA)	3:10:43:47
40	Class40	GER189	Sign for Com	Verdier	Pogo 40 S4	12.19	Lennart Burke (GER); Melwin Fink	3:10:49:00
41	Class40	FRA170	La Boulangere Bio	Raison	Max 40	12.19	Amélie Grassi (FRA)	3:10:52:53
42	IMOCA 60	BEL-207	D'Ieteren Group	Fa-Dery	IMOCA 60	18.28	Denis Van Weynbergh (BEL); Erwann Le Mene	3:11:04:51
43	IRC Zero	FRA-53028	Lady First 3	Juan-K Simeone	Mylius 60	18.50	Jean-Pierre Dréau (FRA)	3:11:49:39
44	IMOCA 60	GBR77	Medallia	Verdier VPLP	IMOCA 60	18.28	Pip Hare (GBR); Nick Bubb (GBR)	3:12:32:48 ^{1}
45	Class40	181	Alla Grande Pirelli	Guelfi	Musa 40	12.19	Ambrogio Beccaria (ITA); Nicolas Andrieu	3:12:32:53 ^{1}
46	Class40	FRA195	Vogue Avec un Crohn	Manuard	Mach 40.5	12.19	Pierre-Louis Attwell (FRA); Maxime Bensa	3:12:35:12
47	Class40	SUI186	IBSA	Manuard	Mach 40.5	12.19	Alberto Bona (ITA)	3:12:45:42 ^{1}
48	IRC Zero	FRA830	Albator	Nivelt	NMD 43	13.07	Philippe Frantz (FRA)	3:12:56:14
49	Class40	USA144	Kite	Manuard	Mach 40	12.19	Greg Leonard (USA) & Hannes Leonard (USA)	3:12:56:55
50	Class40	FRA165	Edenred-Enjoy Racing 2	Manuard	Mach 40.4	12.19	Christopher Cremades (FRA); Emmanuel Le Roch (FRA)	3:12:57:39 ^{1}
51	Class40	FRA190	BT Blue-Alternative Sailing	Manuard	Mach 40.5	12.19	Nicolas Groleau (FRA)	3:12:59:41 ^{1}
52	Class40	FRA172	Zeiss-WeeeCycling	Verdier	Pogo 40 S4	12.19	Thimoté Polet (FRA)	3:14:29:27 ^{1}
53	IRC Zero	H700	Stormvogel	Vanderstadt	73 Ketch	22.60	Ermanno Traverso (GBR); Tom Ripard	3:22:01:46
54	IRC Zero	GBR3875X	Phosphorus II	Nivelt	Archambault A13	13.10	Mark Emerson (GBR)	3:23:08:21
55	IRC Zero	GBR715R	Pegasus of Northumberland	Shilvington Road	IMOCA 50	15.24	Chris Briggs (GBR); Jon McColl	3:23:11:39
56	IRC 1	GER7759	Ginkgo		Humphreys 39	11.72	Dirk Clasen (GER)	4:01:45:21
57	IRC Zero	DEN35551	Palby Marine	Elliott	Super Sport 35	10.61	Michael Mollmann (DEN)	4:04:01:04
58	IRC Zero	GER7007	Stortebeker		Carkeek 47	14.30	Max Gartner (GER)	4:04:14:16
59	IRC 1	GBR888X	Sunrise III	Valer	JPK 11.80	11.80	Tom Kneen (GBR)	4:04:17:14
60	IRC 1	FRA38568	Pintia	Johnstone	J133	13.11	Gilles Fournier (FRA); Corinne Migraine (FRA)	4:04:20:47
61	IRC Zero	FRA43534	Challenge Ocean	Davidson	Volvo Ocean 60	19.50	Valdo Dhoyer (FRA)	4:05:14:03
62	IRC 1	GBR6712R	Dawn Treader	Valer	JPK 11.80	11.80	Ed Bell (UK)	4:05:22:28
63	IRC 1	FRA53081	Cocody	Valer	JPK 11.80	11.80	Richard Fromentin (FRA)	4:06:51:32
64	IRC 1	FRA43857	L'Ange de Milon	Valer	Milon 41	12.48	Jacques Pelletier (FRA)	4:07:59:59
65	IRC Zero	GER6300	Haspa Hamburg	Judel Vrolijk	TP52	15.85	Gerrit Rampendahl (GER)	4:09:09:43
66	IRC 1	GBR2664R	Darkwood	Johnstone	J121	12.19	Michael O'Donnell (IRL)	4:09:42:44
67	IRC 1	GBR390X	Xanaboo	Nivelt	JND 39	11.77	Bruce Huber (GBR); Hugh Doherty	4:10:12:20
68	IRC 1	FRA36777	Codiam	J&J	Grand Soleil 43	12.92	Jean Claude Nicoleau (FRA); Nicolas Loday	4:10:19:03
69	IRC 1 Two Handed	FRA346	Lann Ael 3	Manuard	Nivelt MN35	10.60	Didier Gaudoux (FRA)	4:10:26:51
70	IRC 1	GBR4669R	Pata Negra		Lombard 46	13.88	Andrew Hall (GBR) & Sam Hall (GBR)	4:10:27:21
71	Class40	FRA65	Yoda	Lombard	Class 40	12.19	Franz Bouvet (FRA)	4:11:06:56
72	Class40	GER111	Cantaloop40	Lombard	Akilaria RC2	12.19	David Rowen (GER); Dr. Sébastien Ropohl	4:11:53:10
73	IRC 1	GBR9244R	Samatom	Polli	Grand Soleil 44 Race	13.40	Robert Rendell (GBR); Conor Fogerty	4:12:08:16
74	Class40	FRA140	Selma Racing-Class 40	Rougier-Gouard	Sabrose 40 Mark 2	12.19	Artur Skrzyszowski (POL)	4:12:31:28
75	Class40	FRA88	Earwen	Verdier	Class 40	12.19	Kieran Le Borgne (FRA); Basile Buisson (FRA)	4:13:31:37
76	IRC 1	SWE777	Solong	Simonis-Voogd	Dehler 45	13.69	Johan Bratt (SWE)	4:13:34:09
77	IRC 1	GER8210	Mariejo	Finot-Conq	Pogo 44	12.80	Tobias Brinkmann (GER); Martin Buck	4:14:07:12
78	IRC Zero	AUS7742	Kialoa II	Sparkman & Stephens	S&S 73 Yawl	23.00	Patrick Broughton (AUS)	4:14:07:52
79	IRC 2 Two Handed	FRA-53162	Juzzy	Valer	JPK 10.30	10.34	Thomas Bonnier (FRA); David Prono (FRA)	4:14:09:26
80	IRC 2	FRA9624	Hey Jude	Johnstone	J-Boats / J-120	12.19	Philippe Girardin (FRA)	4:14:09:26
81	IRC 2 Two Handed	USA 68900	Red Ruby	Andrieu	Jeanneau / Sunfast 3300	9.99	Christina Wolfe (USA) & Justin Wolfe (USA)	4:14:23:54
82	IRC 2	FRA53144	Karavel	Valer	JPK 10.80	10.80	Frederic Nouel (FRA); Denis Lazat	4:14:40:03
83	IRC 1	FRA27950	Acalina3	Jeppesen	X-Yachts / X-50	15.20	Henri Baetz (FRA) & Fabien Baetz (FRA)	4:14:42:46
84	IRC 1	FRA18	Precitechnqiue Makarios	VPLP	Beneteau Figaro 3	9.76	Alexandre Rosenblatt (FRA)	4:14:52:19
85	IRC 1	NED8935	Moana	Johnstone	J122e	12.20	Frans van Cappelle (NED)	4:15:02:48
86	IRC 1	BEL4701	Moana	Farr	Beneteau First 47.7	14.90	Mathieu Goubau (BEL)	4:15:03:54
87	IRC 1	LAT909	Orange Mecanix 2	Jeppesen	X-Yachts / XP-44	13.30	Maxime de Mareuil (FRA)	4:15:04:02
88	IRC 2 Two Handed	FRA53239	Axe Sail	Johnstone	J/99	9.90	Maxime Mesnil (FRA); Hugo Feydit	4:15:16:56
89	IRC 2 Two Handed	GBR4436L	Mzungu!	Valer	JPK 10.30	10.34	Sam White (GBR); Sam North (GBR)	4:15:18:05
90	IRC 2 Two Handed	GBR1663R	Chilli Pepper	Andrieu	Jeanneau / Sunfast 3300	9.99	Jim & Ellie Driver (GBR)	4:15:47:04
91	IRC 1	GBR-1428R	Rogan Josh	Farr	Beneteau First 40	12.20	Richard Powell (GBR)	4:15:47:25
92	IRC 2	GBR8936R	Black Sheep	Andrieu	Jeanneau / Sunfast 3600	10.80	Jake Carter (GBR)	4:15:59:42
93	IRC 2 Two Handed	GBR8657L	Bellino	Andrieu	Jeanneau / Sunfast 3600	10.80	Rob Craigie (GBR); Deb Fish (GBR)	4:16:01:09
94	IRC 1 Two Handed	FRA28	Tuf Tuf Tuf	Lombard	Beneteau Figaro 2	10.09	Pascal Tuffier (FRA); Xavier Decosse (FRA)	4:16:01:46
95	IRC 2 Two Handed	FRA53189	Festa 2	Andrieu	Jeanneau / Sunfast 3300	9.99	Jean Francois Hamon (FRA); Alex Ozon (FRA)	4:16:04:35 ^{1}
96	IRC 1	GBR942R	Bulldog	Johnstone	J122	12.20	Derek Shakespeare (GBR)	4:16:09:15
97	IRC 2 Two Handed	FRA53131	Mecanique Expertises	Valer	JPK 10.30	10.34	Gerard Quenot (FRA); Luc Fourichon	4:16:12:10
98	IRC 2 Two Handed	GBR2095R	Surf	Andrieu	Jeanneau / Sunfast 3300	9.99	Adrian Dyball (GBR); Ben Palmer (GBR)	4:16:13:29
99	IRC 2	GBR1815X	Fujitsu British Soldier	Andrieu	Jeanneau / Sunfast 3600	10.80	Henry Foster (GBR)	4:16:17:12
100	IRC 1	8565	Eve	Sparkman & Stephens	Nautor Swan / Swan 65	19.68	Benjamin Roulant (AUS)	4:16:27:15
101	IRC Zero	GBR2289L	Catzero	Humphreys	Challenge Business 72	21.63	Danny Watson (GBR); Rachael Sprot	4:16:27:45
102	IRC 2 Two Handed	FRA43831	Timeline	Valer	JPK 10.80	10.80	Marc Alperovitch (FRA); Jerome Huillard	4:16:28:52
103	IRC 2 Two Handed	FRA43853	Solenn for Pure Ocean	Valer	JPK 10.80	10.80	Ludovic Gerard (FRA); Nicolas Brossay	4:16:32:25
104	IRC 3	FRA34978	Locmalo	Joubert Nivelt	Archambault 35	10.59	Jérôme Fournier Le Ray (FRA)	4:16:37:40
105	IRC 1	GBR1X	Faenol	Maunard	Beneteau First 36	11.00	Steven Godard (GBR); Sam Manuard	4:16:46:00
106	IRC 2 Two Handed	GBR8438R	Orbit	Andrieu	Jeanneau / Sunfast 3300	9.99	Dan Fellows (GBR) & Zeb Fellows (GBR)	4:16:50:22
107	IRC 3 Two Handed	FRA37454	Les P'tits Doudous en Duo	Valer	JPK 10.10	10.04	Romain Gibon (FRA); Alban Mesnil (FRA)	4:16:52:18
108	IRC 3 Two Handed	FRA53114	Adeosys	Valer	JPK 10.10	10.04	Ludovic Menahes (FRA); David Le Goff (FRA)	4:17:00:43
109	IRC 3 Two Handed	FRA43683	Tracass	Valer	JPK 10.10	10.04	Loeiz Cadiou (FRA)	4:17:03:08
110	IRC 2	GBR7383R	Puma	Stimson	Reflex 38	11.58	Jérôme Desvaux (FRA)	4:17:13:04
111	IRC Zero	GER6000	Walross 4		Nissen 56	16.99	Konrad Sagebiel (GER)	4:17:21:49
112	IRC 1	SVK93	Sabre II	Lombard	Akilaria 40	12.19	Miroslav Jakubcik (SVK); Marek Culen (SVK)	4:17:45:20
113	IRC 3 Two Handed	AUS99	Disko Trooper_Contender Sailcloth	Johnstone	J99	9.90	Jules Hall (AUS); Jan Scholten	4:17:58:30
114	IRC 3	ESP10682	Gorilon	Johnstone	J99	9.90	Juanon Bedia (ESP)	4:18:04:57
115	IRC 2	GBR3600X	Killing Time	Andrieu	Jeanneau / Sunfast 3600	10.80	Alastair Bisson (GBR)	4:18:13:19
116	IRC 3 Two Handed	FRA35289	Cora	Andrieu	Jeanneau Sunfast 3200R	9.78	Tim Goodhew (GBR); Kelvin Matthews (GBR)	4:18:27:58
117	IRC 3	NED9469	Fever	Johnstone	J35	10.82	Simeon Tienpont (NED)	4:18:34:07
118	IRC 2 Two Handed	GBR776	Vela Roja	Valer	JPK 10.30	10.34	Christian Teichmann (GER); Hugh Brayshaw	4:18:45:52
119	IRC 3 Two Handed	GER7291	Sharifa	Valer	JPK 10.10	10.04	Rasmus Töpsch (GER); Bertil Balser	4:18:46:26
120	IRC 2	IRL2129	Nieulargo	Botin Carkeek	Grand Soleil 40 B+C	12.12	Denis Murphy (IRL)	4:18:47:34
121	IRC 2	GBR8872R	Challenger 2	Humphreys	Challenge Business 72	21.63	John Farndell (GBR)	4:18:53:24
122	IRC 3 Two Handed	FRA9210	Delnic	Valer	JPK 10.10	10.04	Benoit Rousselin (FRA); Quentin Riché (25x17px)	4:19:15:03
123	IRC 1	SWE918	Garm	Valer	JPK 11.80	11.80	Per Roman (SWE)	4:19:15:37 ^{2}
124	IRC 2	NED9102	Narwal	Johnstone	J112e	11.00	Ubbo Neisingh (NED)	4:19:15:44
125	IRC 1	FRA9795	Endless Summer		Balta 44	13.50	Manuel Da Rocha (FRA)	4:19:44:17
126	IRC 3 Two Handed	FRA38308	Kurun	Valer	JPK 10.10	10.04	Patrick Paul (FRA) & Maxime Paul (FRA)	4:19:51:16
127	IRC 1	GER468	Germania VI	Sparkman & Stephens	S&S 73	22.24	Jens Seiderer (GER)	4:20:01:53
128	IRC 2	GBR2627R	Lord of the Dance	Andrieu	Jeanneau / Sunfast 3300	9.99	Grzegorz Kalinecki (POL)	4:20:04:14
129	Class40	FRA124	For My Planet	Lombard	Akilaria RC3	12.19	Julia Virat (FRA); Louise Duval	4:20:07:22
130	IRC 2	GBR3438L	Jameerah	Johnstone	J120	12.19	Simon Ruffles (GBR)	4:20:31:54
131	IRC 1	GBR1479T	Baraka	Frers	Nautor Swan / Swan 53	16.08	Ben Day (USA)	4:20:33:00
132	IRC 2	IRL5991	Prime Suspect	Mark Mills	36 Custom	10.99	Keith Miller (IRL)	4:20:42:56
133	IRC 4	FRA17815	Sun Hill III	Judel Vrolijk	Dehler 33 CR	9.96	François Charles (FRA)	4:20:54:16
134	IRC 1	GBR4778R	EH01	Farr Beneteau 47.7	14.50	Neil Maher (GBR)	4:20:56:33	
135	IRC 2	GBR-5591L	One Way	Andrieu	Jeanneau / Sunfast 3600	10.80	Dan Rigden (GBR); David Melville	4:20:59:12
136	IRC 1	GBR-597R	Itma	Jeppesen	X-50	15.24	Tom Scott (GBR)	4:21:57:56
137	IRC 2 Two Handed	POL-80	Pneuma	Valer	JPK 10.30	10.34	Andrzej Rozycki (POL); Pawel Tryzna	4:22:03:21
138	IRC 2	GBR927R	Atomic	Andrieu	Jeanneau / Sunfast 3300	9.99	Chris Agace (GBR)	4:22:04:00
139	IRC 2	GBR-833X	Hooligan VIII	Andrieu	Jeanneau / Sunfast 3300	9.99	Ed Broadway (GBR)	4:22:04:36
140	IRC 2	GBR-1355R		Sparkman & Stephens	Swan 55 Yawl	16.75	Ben Morris (GBR)	4:22:07:46
141	IRC 1	BEL-5355	Pinta 42	Judel Vrolijk	Rodman 42	12.40	Dirk Hellemans (BEL)	4:22:16:52
142	IRC 3	FRA-43904	Lemancello	Andrieu	Jeanneau Sunfast 3200	9.78	Py Pascal (FRA); Franck Aussedat	4:22:32:21
143	IRC 1 Two Handed	MLT47	Otra Vez	Johnstone	J122	12.20	Uneco de Meester (NED); Hendrik Jan Molenaar	4:22:33:03
144	IRC 3 Two Handed	GBR958R	Jangada	Valer	JPK 10.10	10.04	Richard Palmer (GBR) & Sophie Palmer (GBR)	4:22:41:52
145	IRC 2	GBR711N	Kimanche Eve II	Valer	JPK 10.80	10.80	Mark Franklin (GBR); Simon Pettitt (GBR)	4:22:57:26
146	IRC 2	USA74434	Hiro Maru	Sparkman & Stephens	S&S 49 Custom	15.05	Hiroshi Nakajima (USA)	4:23:05:52
147	IRC 3	FRA1092	Blouna	Johnstone	J109	10.74	Francois-Xavier Mahon (FRA); Jean Philippe (FRA)	4:23:33:19
148	IRC 3	GBR9588R	Jacana	Johnstone	J105	10.50	Connie Stevens (GBR)	4:23:44:49
149	IRC 4 Two Handed	FRA27550	Elma	Valer	JPK 9.60	9.60	Marc Willame (FRA); Antoine Jeu	4:23:46:19
150	IRC Zero	GBR9353T	CV3 Adventurous	Dubois	Clipper 68	20.77	Dale Smyth (GBR)	5:00:01:59
151	IRC 1	GBR8873R	Challenger 3	Humphreys	Challenge Business 72	21.63	Ricky Chambers (GBR)	5:00:05:49
152	IRC 1	FRA45612	Eilean	Finot Conq	Pogo 36	10.86	Markus Schwarz (AUT); Thomas Zajac	5:00:08:58
153	IRC 1	POL14833	Fujimo AB	Judel Vrolijk	44	13.35	Tomasz Kosobucki (POL)	5:00:10:54
154	IRC 3 Two Handed	FRA37568	Papillon	Valer	JPK 10.10	10.04	Alexis Vaganay (FRA); Arnaud Minvielle	5:00:23:36
155	IRC 3 Two Handed	FRA36865	Coeur de Chauffe 3	Andrieu	Jeanneau Sunfast 3200	9.78	Henri Laurent (FRA); Loïc Gelebart	5:00:33:18
156	IRC 3	NED101	Sailselect	Judel Vrolijk	Varianta 37	11.27	Jeroen Koninkx (NED)	5:00:33:45
157	IRC 3	GBR1575L	Pure Attitude	Jeppesen	X37	11.35	Thomas Wilson (GBR)	5:00:35:30
158	IRC 3 Two Handed	GBR9779T	Jago	Johnstone	J109	10.74	Mike Yates (GBR); Will Holland	5:01:05:49
159	IRC 2	GER7265	Loewe von Bremen	Andrieu	Jeanneau / Sunfast 3600	10.80	Frederick Nabor (GER)	5:02:14:43
160	IRC Zero	GBR809	Lutine	Jeppesen	X55	16.83	James Close (GBR)	5:02:15:41
161	IRC 1	GBR8874R	Challenger 4	Humphreys	Challenge Business 72	21.63	Sue Geary (GBR)	5:02:18:15
162	IRC 4	GBR8338	With Alacrity	Thomas	Sigma 38	11.55	Chris Choules (GBR)	5:02:22:07
163	IRC 1	ESP 3880	Mylla	Jeppesen	XP-38	11.58	Javier Sanchez Lamelas (ESP)	5:02:42:11
164	IRC 3	FRA34697	Kiralamur	Andrieu	Jeanneau Sunfast 3200	9.78	Pierre Leferve (FRA)	5:02:44:40
165	IRC Zero	GER333	Atlantix Express	Petit	Open 45	13.71	Sascha Schmid (GER)	5:03:29:31
166	IRC 3	GER4326	Bern		Comfortina 38	11.66	Christian Heermann (GER)	5:04:00:08
167	IRC 3	IRL1990	Imp	Holland	39 IOR	12.03	George Radley (IRL)	5:04:00:59
168	IRC 1	SWE13	C-Me	Farr	Beneteau First 40 CR	12.24	Håkan Grönvall (SWE); Olof Granander	5:04:10:36 ^{3}
169	IRC 1	BEL9852	Ragazza IV	Mills	37 Custom	11.12	Jan Gabriel (BEL)	5:04:13:15
170	IRC 2 Two Handed	FRA43673	Dare Dare	Nivelt	Archambault A35R	10.58	Michel Darnaudguilhem (FRA); Christopher Bru	5:05:28:14 ^{3}
171	IRC 1	GBR2993L	Minnie the Minx	Farr	Beneteau First 40	12.24	Richard Catchpole (GBR); Jen Moorby	5:05:33:30
172	IRC 3	GBR6939R	Finally	Humphreys	Elan 350	10.60	Paul Kitteringham (GBR)	5:05:43:38
173	IRC 1	FRA45011	Egregore	Finot Conq	Pogo 1250	12.19	Jean-Baptiste Fédide (FRA)	5:05:49:30
174	IRC 3	GBR9265R	Boracic	Botin Carkeek	Grand Soleil 37	11.30	Calum McKie (GBR)	5:05:54:15
175	IRC 3	NED8244	Jalla! Jalla!	Johnstone	J105	10.50	Michel Visser (NED)	5:06:06:19
176	IRC 3 Two Handed	GBR4799R	Jiro	Johnstone	J99	9.90	Mark Kendall (GBR); Tom Holloway	5:06:06:34
177	IRC Zero	GBR9357T	CV8 Tenacious	Dubois	Cilpper 68	20.77	Sophie O'Neill (GBR)	5:06:19:32
178	IRC 2	GBR7381R	Cougar of Cowes	Stimpson	Reflex 38	11.58	Ruadraidh Plummer (GBR)	5:06:58:30
179	IRC 3	FRA38387	Miss Leading	Valer	JPK 10.10	10.04	Fred Guillemot (FRA)	5:07:14:09
180	IRC 3	GBR8809R	Mojo Risin	Johnstone	J109	10.74	Rob Cotterill (GBR)	5:07:27:51
181	IRC Zero	GBR9351T	CV2 Ambitious	Dubois	Cilpper 68	20.77	Nick Graham (GBR)	5:07:55:40
182	IRC 2	GBR6593T	Petruchio	Farr	Beneteau 40.7	11.92	Ray Campion (GBR)	5:08:20:15
183	IRC 4	BEL38	Leda	Sparkman & Stephens	Swan 38	11.66	Jan Toussein (BEL)	5:08:33:45
184	IRC 4 Two Handed	GBR360	Flycatcher of Yar	Sparkman & Stephens	Contessa 38	11.72	Henry Clay (GBR) & Edward Clay (GBR)	5:08:34:02
185	IRC 3	GBR6809R	Jybe Talkin	Johnstone	J109	10.74	Chris Burleigh (GBR)	5:09:03:27
186	IRC 4	GER6791	Dickebank	Koopmans	Victoire 1200	12.01	Wolfgang Doczyck (GER)	5:09:24:32
187	IRC 4	NED5859	Vanilla	Jeppesen	X332	10.06	Niek Spiljard (NED)	5:09:25:24
188	IRC 3 Two Handed	GBR2842L	Sun Kosi	Andrieu	Jeanneau Sunfast 3200	9.78	Miles Delap (GBR); Keith Oliver	5:10:11:41
189	IRC 1	BEL450	Aquavit	Briand	Beneteau First 45	13.68	Franklin Aquavit (BEL); Franklin Wagemans	5:11:00:46 ^{3}
190	IRC 4	GBR8396	Sam	Thomas	Sigma 38	11.55	Peter Hopps (GBR)	5:11:01:58
191	IRC 3	GER655	Snifix Dry		Peterson 43	13.04	Erhard Zimmermann (GER); Wilhelm Demel	5:11:30:17
192	IRC 3 Two Handed	BEL1888	Propaganda 3	Molino	MMW 33	9.96	Benoit Cornet (FRA)	5:11:42:00 ^{2}
193	IRC 4 Two Handed	GBR6388T	Marta	Thomas	Sigma 38	11.55	Brian Skeet (GBR); Nicolas Malapert	5:12:06:51
194	IRC 2	USA51020	Momentum	McCurdy Rhodes	Hinckley Sou'wester 51	15.34	Paul Kanev (USA); Ken Reilley	5:12:47:19
195	IRC 1	BEL11111	Djinn	Johnstone	J111	11.15	Sylvain Duprey (BEL)	5:12:50:41 ^{2}
196	IRC 1	GBR1601R	Jeu D'Esprit	Johnstone	J160	16.10	Henry Ayres (GBR)	5:12:57:30
197	IRC 3 Two Handed	GBR8956R	Delay No More	Andrieu	Jeanneau Sunfast 3200	9.78	Nigel Davis (GBR); Nick Southward	5:13:37:10
198	IRC 1	GBR4018L	Jazz	Farr	Beneteau First 40	12.24	Mitchel Fowler (GBR)	5:13:38:14
199	IRC Zero	GBR9358T	CV9 Courageous	Dubois	Cilpper 68	20.77	Alex Laline (GBR)	5:13:38:33 ^{2}
200	IRC 1	FRA43867	Albatros	Thomas	Challenge 67	20.42	Etienne Boizet (FRA)	5:13:56:17 ^{4}
201	IRC 3 Two Handed	IOM7003	Polished Manx 2	Isle of Man	Farr Beneteau 40.7	11.92	Kuba Szymanski; Maciej Lato	5:14:50:42
202	IRC 4	GBR8354	Spirit	(United Kingdom) Great Britain	Thomas Sigma 38	11.55	Paul Scott; Geoff Lynch	5:14:53:56
203	IRC 3	NED9675	Frans Duvel II	Netherlands	Strahlmann Finngulf 37	11.25	Coen Piccardt Brouwer	5:14:56:20
204	IRC 3 Two Handed	FIN709	Irie	Finland	Johnstone J109	10.74	Sanna Moliis; Julius Haartti	5:15:25:02
205	IRC 1	SUI4777	Kali	Switzerland	Farr Beneteau First 47.7	14.50	Benedikt Clauberg	5:15:32:51
206	IRC 3	GBR3737L	Unruly	(United Kingdom) Great Britain	Jeppesen X37	11.35	Charles Bull	5:15:45:04
207	IRC 3	GBR8876T	Panther	Germany	Johnstone J105	10.57	Dr. Michael Rietz; Bernd Kirchberg	5:15:47:10
208	IRC 3	4300C	Reindeer	(United Kingdom) Great Britain	Sparkman & Stephens Swan 43	13.07	Jack Meredith	5:15:51:28
209	IRC 2	GBR5055L	IO of Dartmouth	(United Kingdom) Great Britain	Macmillan Spirit 50 CR	14.98	Stephen Brookson	5:16:57:43
210	IRC 1	GBR1419L	Sidney II	(United Kingdom) Great Britain	Judel Vrolijk Grand Soleil 50	14.90	Bob Mechem; Tanya Sullivan	5:16:57:43
211	IRC 4 Two Handed	GBR9700X	Raging Bull 3	(United Kingdom) Great Britain	Johnstone J97	9.61	Tim Tolcher; Will Deutsch	5:17:03:25
212	IRC 2	NED8489	Windshift	Netherlands	Judel Vrolijk V44 Performance	13.10	Remco Schilderinck	5:17:25:49
213	IRC 4 Two Handed	GBR3936	British Beagle	(United Kingdom) Great Britain	Sigma Thomas 36	10.98	Charles Emmett; Tim Winsey	5:18:47:00
214	IRC 3	GBR8367T	Red Hawk	(United Kingdom) Great Britain	Farr Beneteau First 36	10.68	James Armstrong; Jenn Ramsdale	5:20:16:06
215	IRC 3	GBR9941T	Ju Kyu	(United Kingdom) Great Britain	Johnstone J109	10.74	Dr. Peter Rowe; Jon Rowe	5:20:44:26 ^{5}
216	IRC 3	GBR922R	Juno	(United Kingdom) Great Britain	Jeppesen X34	10.36	Simon Bottoms	5:20:48:12
217	IRC 1	FIN15682	Eira	Finland	Frers Swan 53 Mk II	15.62	Sebastian & Pontus Gylling	5:21:07:45 ^{2}
218	IRC 1	GBR6840R	Lancelot II	(United Kingdom) Great Britain	Farr Beneteau First 40	12.24	John Gillard	5:21:09:41
219	IRC 1	GBR4019N	Tango	(United Kingdom) Great Britain	Farr Beneteau First 40	12.24	Giles Bancroft	5:21:25:40
220	IRC 2	GBR1415L	Mad Dash	(United Kingdom) Great Britain	Humphries Elan 410	12.28	Phil Morgan	5:22:44:13
221	IRC 2	GBR1321L	Escapado	(United Kingdom) Great Britain	Farr Beneteau First 40.7	11.92	Germaine Williams	5:23:10:11
222	IRC 3 Two Handed	IOM8931R	AJ Wanderlust	United States	Briand Jeanneau 45.2 Sun Odyssey	13.80	Charlene Howard; Robert Drummond	5:23:24:38
223	IRC 4	49	Hultaj	Poland	Finot Beret Figaro 1	9.15	Szymon Kuczyński; Anna Jastrzębska	5:23:26:20
2242	IRC 2	GBR8900R	Majic 2	Guernsey	Johnstone J120	12.19	Ron Wilkes-Green	5:23:28:02
225	IRC 1	GBR7451R	Promise 3	(United Kingdom) Great Britain	Farr Beneteau First 47.7	14.50	Steve Robinson; John R. Williams	6:01:31:21
226	IRC 4 Two Handed	FRA34824	Casamyas	France	Valer JPK 9.60	9.60	Samuel Duménil; Antoine Runet	6:01:51:56 ^{6}
227	IRC 4	GBR292	Amokura	(United Kingdom) Great Britain	Shepherd 50 Classic Yawl	15.32	Paul Moxon	6:01:52:14
228	IRC 4	GBR3950	Woozle Hunter	(United Kingdom) Great Britain	Thomas Sigma 33	9.87	Alex Thomas	6:02:11:26
229	IRC 4	A19	Maluka	Australia	Gale Ranger 30	9.01	Sean Langman	6:03:40:43
230	IRC 3	GER6668	Toke	Germany	Humphries Elan 360	10.60	Nora M. Puls	6:03:49:55
231	IRC 4	GBR8756T	Nimrod	(United Kingdom) Great Britain	Lombard Jeanneau Sunfast 35	10.43	Paul-Love Williams	6:05:30:43
232	IRC 4 Two Handed	GBR4350L	Felix	Austria	Jeppesen X332	10.06	Christoph Friedrich; Oleg Lebedev	6:05:34:03
233	IRC 2	GBR5358L	HMSTC Eagle of Hornet	(United Kingdom) Great Britain	Bern Comfortina 42	12.80	David Cummings	6:08:33:05 ^{2}
234	IRC 4	IRL638	State O'Chassis	(Republic of Ireland) Ireland	Thomas Sigma 38	11.55	Mike Murphy; Kevin Buckley	6:10:47:20
235	IRC 3	FRA170	Ioalla V	France	Andrieu Jeanneau Sunfast 3200	9.78	Yvan Le Trequesser	6:11:46:22 ^{7}
236	IRC 1	GBR1232T	Phantom	(United Kingdom) Great Britain	Laurent-Giles 44 One Off	13.34	Ashley Weston	6:11:53:51
237	IRC 4	IRL3852	Blue Oyster	(Republic of Ireland) Ireland	Holman Pye Oyster 37	11.26	Noel Coleman	6:11:57:07
238	IRC 3 Two Handed	GBR6777	Bespoke	(United Kingdom) Great Britain	Humphries 30 Modified	9.35	Neal Brewer; Andrew Baker	6:12:12:07
239	IRC 4	GBR9967Y	Ugly Duckling	(United Kingdom) Great Britain	Sparkman & Stephens Sagitta 35	10.52	George Beevor	6:13:01:12
240	IRC 3	NED9168	Dansen Aan Zee	Netherlands	Judel Vrolijk Hanse 400	11.99	Gian Paolo Imponente	6:16:29:20
241	IRC 2	GBR5779L	Cork Malt II	(United Kingdom) Great Britain	Berret Racoupeau Beneteau Oceanis 50	14.75	Mart Andrews	6:17:16:48
242	IRC 2	5815L	Emma	(United Kingdom) Great Britain	Racoupeau Garcia Exploration 52	15.84	Rebecca Hirsch; Clothilde-Marie Bernard	6:21:55:00
243	IRC 3	GBR7005R	Trojan	(United Kingdom) Great Britain	Johnstone J109	10.74	Andy Motion	7:05:05:22
244	IRC 4	FR14	Fulmar Fever	(Republic of Ireland) Ireland	Dubois Westerly Fulmar 32	9.71	Robert Marchant	7:05:06:55 ^{2}
245	IRC 4	7	Le Loup Rouge	France	Illinworth Primrose 36 Maica RORC	11.06	Pierre Le Loup Rouge; Thierry Regnault	7:13:24:02
DNF	IRC Super Zero	NED 8	Green Dragon	Switzerland	Reichel Pugh Volvo Open 70	21.50	Johannes Schwarz; Cathal Mahon	Retired
DNF	IRC Zero	GER7323	Milan	France	Farr STP 65	19.99	Pascal Oddo	Retired
DNF	IRC Zero	FRA2025	Spirit of Lorina	France	Botin 65	19.99	Jean Pierre Barjon; Gildas Philippe	Retired
DNF	IRC Zero	GBR7017R	Black Pearl	Germany	Botin 56	17.10	Stefan Jentzsch	Retired
DNF	IRC Zero	SWE520	Rán	Sweden	Carkeek CF 520	15.86	Niklas Zennstrom	Retired
DNF	IRC Zero	GBR4321R	Oystercatcher XXXV	(United Kingdom) Great Britain	Carkeek CF 520	15.86	Richard Matthews	Retired
DNF	IRC Zero	ITA17565	Hägar V	Italy	Miesbauer Scuderia 65	20.06	Aldo Scuderi	Retired
DNF	IRC Zero	60006	Venomous	(United Kingdom) Great Britain	Farr CM60	18.33	James Gair	Retired
DNF	IRC Zero	NOR15731	Enderpearl	Norway	Briand CNB 76	23.17	Kenneth Bjoerklund	Retired
DNF	IRC Zero	GER7722	Elida	Germany	Tison 48 One-Off Racer Cruiser	14.75	Daniel E. Baum	Retired
DNF	IRC Zero	NED17001	Rost-Van Uden Ker 46	Netherlands	Ker 46	14.02	Gerd-Jan Poortman	Retired
DNF	IRC Zero	NED61137	Baraka GP	Netherlands	Ker 43	13.30	Piet, Dirk & Olivier De Graaf	Retired
DNF	IRC Zero	FRA4600	Tonnerre De Glen	France	Ker 46	14.02	Dominique Tian	Retired
DNF	IRC Zero	POL000Q1R	Fast Forward	Poland	Tripp 50	15.36	Marek Wołoszyn	Retired
DNF	IRC Zero	NED66	Red66	Netherlands	Clarke Class 40	12.18	Hans Brouwer	Retired
DNF	IRC Zero	GBR7445R	Amanjiwo	France	Frers 44	13.70	Sebastien Harinkouck; Gaël Reynaud	Retired
DNF	IRC Zero	GBR90	Rock'n'Roll	(United Kingdom) Great Britain	Clarke Jaz 40	12.19	Adanasy Isaev	Retired
DNF	IRC Zero	GBR4512	People	Netherlands	Farr 45	13.80	Joost Smits	Retired
DNF	IRC Zero	SWE4000	Swee	Sweden	Ker 40	12.15	Lars & Birgitta Elfversson	Retired
DNF	IRC Zero	GBR69R	Coco De Mer	(United Kingdom) Great Britain	Frers Swan 62 RS	18.85	Jonathan Butler	Retired
DNF	IRC Zero; Two Handed	NED7576	La Promesse	Netherlands	Morrison Open 40	12.19	JanKees Lampe; Bart Boosman	Retired
DNF	IRC Zero	GBR9356T	CV7 Curious	(United Kingdom) Great Britain	Dubois Cilpper 68	20.77	Nigel Parry	Retired
DNF	IRC Zero	GBR917R	Andrasta	(United Kingdom) Great Britain	Bateson Iceni 39 Custom	11.97	Ben Ibbotson	Retired
DNF	IRC 1	FRA43631	Long Courrier	France	Ker Sydney 43	13.10	Gery Trentesaux	Retired
DNF	IRC 1	GER6009	Leu	France	Judel Vrolijk 45	13.81	Thierry Deseine	Retired
DNF	IRC 1	FRA35921	Akela	France	Brenneur Akela 46	13.99	Hervé & Guillaume d' Arexy	Retired
DNF	IRC 1	GER6880	Edelweiss	Germany	Lostucci Millenium 40	12.01	Thomas Reinecke	Retired
DNF	IRC 1	FRA45985	Don Papa	Austria	Finot Conq Pogo 44	12.80	Christian Kargl	Retired
DNF	IRC 1 Two Handed	FRA38516	Kazami	France	Finot Pogo 12.50	12.19	Benoît Amalric; Cédric Malengreau	Retired
DNF	IRC 1	FRA43769	Baradoz	France	Finot Pogo 12.50	12.19	Xavier Bellouard	Retired
DNF	IRC 1	GBR1250X	Ca Va	(United Kingdom) Great Britain	Finot Pogo 12.50	12.19	Tony Rayer	Retired
DNF	IRC 1	GBR962R	Mercury	(United Kingdom) Great Britain	Frers Clubswan 42	12.98	Ross Eldred	Retired
DNF	IRC 1	GBR8940R	Espresso Martini Too	(United Kingdom)	Farr 40	12.41	Cameron Davis	Retired
DNF	IRC 1	SA3040	Outlaw	Australia	Peterson Baltic 55	16.70	Campbell Mackie	Retired
DNF	IRC 1	GER4070	Uijuijui	Germany	Harter Rainbow 42	12.83	Maurice Oster	Retired
DNF	IRC 1	GER7504	Juxbox	Germany	Jeppesen X46 Mod	13.99	Ove H. Frabnck	Retired
DNF	IRC 1	FRA53004	Vasco	France	Finot Conq Pogo 36	10.85	Bernard Fondrillon	Retired
DNF	IRC 1	IRL66	Checkmate XX	(Republic of Ireland) Ireland	Briand Beneteau First 50	14.98	Nigel Biggs; David Cullen	Retired
DNF	IRC 1	88	Moonbeam	France	Fife 81 Long Keel Gaff Cutter	24.66	Archie Hinde	Retired
DNF	IRC 1	FRA45313	Izipizi	France	Finot Conq Pogo 36	10.86	Guillaume Ferey	Retired
DNF	IRC 1	FRA43997	Stamina IV	France	Molino MMW 40	11.92	Charlie Ageneau	Retired
DNF	IRC 1	GBR9688R	Dulcissima	France	Johnstone J130	13.08	Hervé Perrein	Retired
DNF	IRC 1	GBR1346R	Belladonna	(United Kingdom) Great Britain	Lostuzzi Grand Soleil 46	14.08	Nick Martin	Retired
DNF	IRC 1	AUT4000	Oida	Austria	Nivelt Archambault A40	11.98	Jamie Townsend	Retired
DNF	IRC 1	FRA157	Fastwave 6	France	Valer JPK 11.80	11.80	Eric Fries	Retired
DNF	IRC 1	GBR60R	Corazon	(United Kingdom) Great Britain	Johnstone J133	13.11	Lawrence Herbert	Retired
DNF	IRC 1	GBR2752R	Sao Jorge	(United Kingdom) Great Britain	Mortain Mavrikios Harmony 52	15.65	Jamie Hembury-Gunn	Retired
DNF	IRC 1	SA2371	Zeus Sailing Adventures	South Africa	Simonis Voogd Fast 42	12.82	Martin Lossie	Retired
DNF	IRC 1 Two Handed	GBR3922R	Jangle	(United Kingdom) Great Britain	Johnstone J122e	12.19	Clive Miles; Will Ayliffe	Retired
DNF	IRC 1	GBR8405R	Olympia's Tigress	(United Kingdom) Great Britain	Farr Beneteau First 40	12.24	Susan Glenny; Jaime Torres	Retired
DNF	IRC 1	GBR724R	40 Love	(United Kingdom) Great Britain	Farr Beneteau First 40	12.24	Edward Harvey; Peter Smith	Retired
DNF	IRC 1	MK6	Galiana WithSecure	Finland	Sparkman & Stephens - Swan 55 Yawl	16.73	Tapio Lehtinen; Ville Norra	Retired
DNF	IRC 1	FRA78	SL Energies Groupe Fastwave	France	Johnstone J111	11.15	Laurent Charmy	Retired
DNF	IRC 1	GBR8409R	Galahad of Cowes	(United Kingdom) Great Britain	Farr Beneteau First 40	12.24	Ronan Banim	Retired
DNF	IRC 1	GBR4147L	Zada	(United Kingdom) Great Britain	Farr Beneteau First 40	12.24	Neil O'Leary	Retired
DNF	IRC 1 Two Handed	NED402	Vita	Netherlands	Nivelt Archambault A40 RC	11.98	Martin Hingst; Dennis de Rutter	Retired
DNF	IRC 1	FRA9602	Fauve	France	Felchi Dufour 44	13.35	Yann Chevallier; Jean-Pierre Duclos	Retired
DNF	IRC 1	FRA19349	Ster Wenn V	France	Jeppesen X442	13.53	Pierre Sallenave	Retired
DNF	IRC 1	GBR3923L	Merlin of Cowes	(United Kingdom) Great Britain	Farr Beneteau First 40	12.24	Steve Foster	Retired
DNF	IRC 1	GBR1859L	Fin First Sfida	(United Kingdom) Great Britain	Farr Beneteau First 40	12.24	Gareth Williams	Retired
DNF	IRC 1	GBR2806L	Winston	(United Kingdom) Great Britain	Farr Beneteau First 40 CR	12.24	Chris Brooks	Retired
DNF	IRC 1	FRA35800	Iritis	France	Farr Beneteau First 40	12.24	Dr. Bénic Hervé	Retired
DNF	IRC 1	GBR7408R	Arthur	(United Kingdom) Great Britain	Farr Beneteau First 40	12.24	Verity Rouse	Retired
DNF	IRC 1	GBR1396R	Black Betty	(United Kingdom) Great Britain	Judel Vrolijk Dehler 30 OD	9.14	Ian Griffiths	Retired
DNF	IRC 1	IRL8882	Mynx	(Republic of Ireland) Ireland	Frers Swan 46	14.05	Kenneth Cunnane	Retired
DNF	IRC 1 Two Handed	NED1100	Jaffix	Netherlands	De Ridder FF 1100	11.00	Floris Ingen Housz; Paul Krekel	Retired
DNF	IRC 1 Two Handed	FRA92	Terre d'Enfants sur L'Atlantique	France	Lombard Figaro 2	10.09	Amaury Dumortier; Geoffrey Thiriez	Retired
DNF	IRC 1 Two Handed	FRA80	Elementine	France	Lombard Figaro 2	10.09	Laurent Domenech-Cabaud; Laurent Bory	Retired
DNF	IRC 2	FRA43749	Nutmeg VI	France	Lombard MC34	10.46	Corentin Lognoné	Retired
DNF	IRC 2	GBR1702T	Scarlet Oyster	(United Kingdom) Great Britain	Schumacher Oyster 48 LW	14.61	Ross Applebey; Jules White	Retired
DNF	IRC 2	GBR6504N	Talisman	(United Kingdom) Great Britain	Jones Prima 38	11.60	Simon Harwood	Retired
DNF	IRC 2	GBR6586L	Scream 2	(United Kingdom) Great Britain	Johnstone J120	12.19	Fergus Roper	Retired
DNF	IRC 2 Two Handed	GBR112N	J'Ouvert	Johnstone	J112e	11.00	Simon Harris (GBR); Robert Stevenson	Retired
DNF	IRC 2 Two Handed	GBR914R	Tigris	Andrieu	Jeanneau / Sunfast 3600	10.80	Mike O'Donovan (GBR); Gavin Howe	Retired
DNF	IRC 2	GBR7343R	Marco Polo	Andrieu	Jeanneau / Sunfast 3600	10.80	Steve Berry (GBR)	Retired
DNF	IRC 2	GBR4647R	Galeforce DrivenByNature.nl	Farr	Beneteau First 40.7	11.92	George Jansen (GBR)	Retired
DNF	IRC 2 Two Handed	GBR3759L	Jelenko II	Andrieu	Jeanneau / Sunfast 3600	10.80	Joppe Schepers; Jasper Heikens	Retired
DNF	IRC 2	SWE450	Emily of Cowes	Humphries	Elan 450	13.60	Stefan Kunz (SWE)	Retired
DNF	IRC 2	GBR503R	May Contain Nuts	Corby	34.7	10.38	Kevin Rolfe (GBR)	Retired
DNF	IRC 2 Two Handed	FRA43713	Vari	Andrieu	Jeanneau / Sunfast 3600	10.80	Yann Jestin (FRA); Romain Baggio	Retired
DNF	IRC 2	GBR9043T	Flying Fish	Farr	Beneteau First 40.7	11.92	Christian Buehrlen (GBR)	Retired
DNF	IRC 2 Two Handed	FRA53012	Ciao Ciao	Andrieu	Jeanneau / Sunfast 3600	10.80	Paolo Mangione (FRA) & Francesco Mangione (FRA)	Retired
DNF	IRC 2	GBR8383R	Assassin	Jones	Prima 38	11.60	Matt Bundell (GBR)	Retired
DNF	IRC 2 Two Handed	FRA53161	Phu Cam	Andrieu	Jeanneau / Sunfast 3600	10.80	Philippe Viet Triem Tong (FRA); Jean-Luc Lagrave	Retired
DNF	IRC 2 Two Handed	FRA39533	Be Happy	Andrieu	Jeanneau / Sunfast 3600	10.80	Frederic Couture (FRA); Philippe Gaudru (FRA)	Retired
DNF	IRC 2 Two Handed	GBR1653R	Ikigai	Valer	JPK 10.80	10.80	Miles Woodhouse (GBR); Dom Hurndall	Retired
DNF	IRC 2	GBR684	Quailo III	Wall	Nicholson 55	16.40	Andrew Tseng (GBR)	Retired
DNF	IRC 2	IRL3618	Yoyo	Andrieu	Jeanneau / Sunfast 3600	10.80	Vincent Pietersz (GBR)	Retired
DNF	IRC 2	FRA53116	Princesse Gotionude II	Andrieu	Jeanneau / Sunfast 3600	10.80	Nicolas Dezeustre (FRA)	Retired
DNF	IRC 2	USA61183	In Theory	Valer	JPK 10.80	10.80	Peter McWhinnie (USA)	Retired
DNF	IRC 2 Two Handed	GBR6779R	Kestrel	Andrieu	Jeanneau / Sunfast 3300	9.99	Simon Bamford (GBR); Jerome Carson	Retired
DNF	IRC 2 Two Handed	GER8180	Hinden	Valer	JPK 10.30	10.34	Jonas Hallberg (GER); Till Barth (GER)	Retired
DNF	IRC 2 Two Handed	USA61287	Sea Bear	Andrieu	Jeanneau / Sunfast 3300	9.99	Peter Bacon (USA) & Duncan Bacon (USA)	Retired
DNF	IRC 2	GER5762	Dantes	Sparkmans & Stephens	Swan 48	14.61	Michael Orgzey (GER)	Retired
DNF	IRC 2	FRA9843	Turn Left	Valer	JPK 10.30	10.34	Pacome Jouany (FRA)	Retired
DNF	IRC 2 Two Handed	FRA9875	Ladybug 2	Valer	JPK 10.30	10.34	Tangi Caron (FRA); Eric Guigne (FRA)	Retired
DNF	IRC 2	FRA53229	Reve de Souffle	Andrieu	Jeanneau / Sunfast 3300	9.99	Loic Lecomte (FRA)	Retired
DNF	IRC 2 Two Handed	GBR795R	Diablo	Andrieu	Jeanneau / Sunfast 3600	10.80	Nick Martin (GBR); Calanach Finlayson	Retired
DNF	IRC 2 Two Handed	FRA53197	Mary	Valer	JPK 10.30	10.34	François Moriceau (FRA); Christophe Waubant (FRA)	Retired
DNF	IRC 2 Two Handed	GBR1583R	Asgard	Andrieu	Jeanneau / Sunfast 3300	9.99	Conor Corson (GBR); Matt Bird	Retired
DNF	IRC 2	FRA53192	Moshimoshi	Andrieu	Jeanneau / Sunfast 3300	9.99	Sebastien Saulnier (FRA)	Retired
DNF	IRC 2 Two Handed	FRA53213	Moustache	Andrieu	Jeanneau / Sunfast 3300	9.99	Bruno Rzetelny (FRA); Alain Lebreton (FRA)	Retired
DNF	IRC 2 Two Handed	GBR7933R	Fastrak XII	Andrieu	Jeanneau / Sunfast 3300	9.99	Nigel Colley (GBR); Matt Smith	Retired
DNF	IRC 2 Two Handed	FRA53318	Yesss Elec Eau	Valer	JPK 10.30	10.34	Bertrand Fourmond (FRA); Eric Tilly (FRA)	Retired
DNF	IRC 2	FRA53200	Foggy Dew	Valer	JPK 10.30	10.34	Noel Racine (FRA)	Retired
DNF	IRC 2 Two Handed	AUS888	Min River	Valer	JPK 10.30	10.34	Jiang Lin (AUS); Aymeric Belloir	Retired
DNF	IRC 2 Two Handed	FRA53308	Leeuwin	Valer	JPK 10.30	10.34	Bertrand Semaille (FRA); Tristan Debry (FRA)	Retired
DNF	IRC 2	FRA53355	Léonard	Johnstone	J99	9.90	Christophe Prigent (FRA)	Retired
DNF	IRC 2	GBR1519R	Rock Lobster III	Andrieu	Jeanneau / Sunfast 3300	9.99	Fergus Angel (GBR)	Retired
DNF	IRC 2 Two Handed	GBR6502L	Wild Pligrim	Andrieu	Jeanneau / Sunfast 3300	9.99	Daniel Jones (GBR); Jonathan Tyrrell (GBR)	Retired
DNF	IRC 2 Two Handed	IRL1716	Big Deal	Botin Carkeek	Grand Soleil 37 BC	11.30	Derek Dillon (IRL) & Conor Dillon (IRL)	Retired
DNF	IRC 3 Two Handed	GBR7581R	Azora	Jackett	C&C 115	11.45	Stephen Thomas (GBR); Chris Morton (GBR)	Retired
DNF	IRC 3 Two Handed	GBR979R	Malice	Humphries	HOD 35	10.64	Mike Moxley (GBR)	Retired
DNF	IRC 3	BEL222	Gente di Mare	Botin Carkeek	Grand Soleil 40	12.12	Roel Ysewyn (BEL)	Retired
DNF	IRC 3	GBR6908R	White Knight 7	Johnstone	J109	10.74	Oli Bowen (GBR)	Retired
DNF	IRC 3 Two Handed	GBR8532R	Firestorm	Johnstone	J109	10.74	Wim van Slooten (NED); Jochem Nonhebel (NED)	Retired
DNF	IRC 3	FRA53147	Jin Motion	Johnstone	J99	9.90	Francoise Guennal (FRA)	Retired
DNF	IRC 3	GBR9109T	Red Arrow	Johnstone	J109	10.74	Gillian Burgess (GBR)	Retired
DNF	IRC 3 Two Handed	FRA53066	Fastlane 2	Humphreys	Elan 350	10.60	Jérôme Apolda (FRA); Yann Sibé	Retired
DNF	IRC 3	GBR9760R	Jengu	Johnstone	J109	10.74	Neil Cox (GBR)	Retired
DNF	IRC 3	GBR1535R	White Cloud IX	Humphries	HOD 35	10.64	Richard Hart (GBR) & John Donnelly (GBR)	Retired
DNF	IRC 3 Two Handed	FRA43510	Laudato 2	Valer	JPK 10.10	10.04	Clémence Vian (FRA) & Régis Vian (FRA)	Retired
DNF	IRC 3	GBR9487R	Jumunu	Johnstone	J109	10.74	Lesley Brooman (GBR)	Retired
DNF	IRC 3	FRA43912	Papillon 4	Valer	JPK 10.10	10.04	Alain Peron (FRA)	Retired
DNF	IRC 3	GBR1010X	Jet Pack	Valer	JPK 10.10	10.04	Mark Brown (GBR)	Retired
DNF	IRC 3	GBR8932R	Full Circle	Andrieu	Jeanneau / Sunfast 3200	9.78	Ian Lloyd (GBR) & Bryan Lloyd (GBR)	Retired
DNF	IRC 3 Two Handed	GBR735R	Saltheart	Humphries	HOD 35	10.64	Chris Williams (GBR); Chris Brook	Retired
DNF	IRC 3 Two Handed	NED4774	Waverider	Andrieu	Jeanneau / Sunfast 3200	9.78	Willem Schopman (NED); Rogier Jacobsen	Retired
DNF	IRC 3	FRA43944	Vent des Sables	Andrieu	Jeanneau / Sunfast 3200	9.78	Emmanuel Benoit (FRA)	Retired
DNF	IRC 3 Two Handed	FRA-9803	Platypus	Andrieu	Jeanneau / Sunfast 3200	9.78	Philippe Benaben (FRA); Frederic Stoclet (FRA)	Retired
DNF	IRC 3 Two Handed	FRA-43657	Fleur du Sud	Valer	JPK 10.10	10.04	Patrick Molitor (FRA); Cyril Rihet	Retired
DNF	IRC 3 Two Handed	FRA-44737	Enedis	Andrieu	Jeanneau / Sunfast 3200	9.78	Jacques Rigalleau (FRA)	Retired
DNF	IRC 3 Two Handed	FRA-53107	Ishsha	Valer	JPK 10.10	10.04	Eric Bastard (FRA); Alexandre Castelnau (FRA)	Retired
DNF	IRC 3 Two Handed	FRA-44058	Ad Hoc	Valer	JPK 10.10	10.04	Jean-François Chériaux (FRA); Gwenael Jacques (FRA)	Retired
DNF	IRC 3 Two Handed	FRA44379	Uship	Andrieu	Jeanneau / Sunfast 3200	9.78	Patrick Isoard (FRA); Bruno Salle de Chou (FRA)	Retired
DNF	IRC 3	FRA38315	Maigab	Andrieu	Jeanneau / Sunfast 3200	9.78	Christian Jacquelin (FRA)	Retired
DNF	IRC 3 Two Handed	FRA39201	Mirabelle	Andrieu	Jeanneau / Sunfast 3200	9.78	Bertrand Daniels (FRA); Denis Jacob	Retired
DNF	IRC 3 Two Handed	FRA38411	Faribole	Valer	JPK 10.10	10.04	Eric Poyet (FRA); Louis-Philippe Delorme (FRA)	Retired
DNF	IRC 3	NED118	Winsome	Sparkman & Stephens	S&S 41	12.74	Harry J. Heijst (NED)	Retired
DNF	IRC 3	GER7847	Montana	Sparkman & Stephens	Swan 48	14.61	Markus Bocks (GER)	Retired
DNF	IRC 3 Two Handed	FRA36736	Wahoo	Valer	JPK 9.60	9.60	Philippe Coupeau (FRA); Laurent Maindron (FRA)	Retired
DNF	IRC 3	FRA29340	Cavok 4	Valer	JPK 9.60	9.60	Olivier Bahon (FRA)	Retired
DNF	IRC 4	8377	Gaunlet	Thomas	Sigma 38	11.55	Andy Canning (GBR); Tom Nield (GBR)	Retired
DNF	IRC 4	GBR8285	Kindred Spirit	Thomas	Sigma 38	11.55	John Crosbie (GBR)	Retired
DNF	IRC 4 Two Handed	POL-20308	Bindi	Judel Vrolijk	Dehler 33 Classic	9.99	Wladyslaw Chmielewski (POL); Krzysztof Ziolkowski (POL)	Retired
DNF	IRC 4	IRL1397	Desert Star Irish Offshore Sailing	Fauroux	Jeanneau Sunfast 37	10.95	Rónán O Siochru (IRL)	Retired
DNF	IRC 4	GER2193	Truwen	Sparkman & Stephens	Swan 38	11.66	Jens-Werner Hinrichs (GER)	Retired
DNF	IRC 4	GBR2183R	Sunstone	Sparkman & Stephens	S&S 39 One Off	12.10	Will Taylor-Jones (GBR)	Retired
DNF	IRC 4	BE	Sato	Fauroux	Jeanneau Sunrise 34	10.02	Rémi Genon (BEL)	Retired
DNF	IRC 4 Two Handed	GBR73R	Scherzo of Cowes	Sparkman & Stephens	Swan 36	10.91	Jonathan Carter (GBR); Robbie Southwell (GBR)	Retired
DNF	IRC 4 Two Handed	1661C	Magic Moments	Thomas	Sigma 33 OOD	9.87	Andy Etherington (GBR) & Pelham Etherington (GBR)	Retired
DNF	Class40	FRA115	Trimcontrol	Manuard	Mach 40	12.19	Carlo Vroon (FRA); Alexandre Le Gallais (FRA)	Retired
DNF	Class40	SUI159	Tquila	Manuard	Mach 40.4	12.19	Alister Richardson (GBR)	Retired
DNF	Class40	FRA168	The3Bros	Bertrand	Cape 40 V2	12.19	Renaud & Gilles Courbon (FRA)	Retired
DNF	Class40	FRA 185	La Manche Évidence Nautique	Manuard	Mach 40.5	12.19	Nicolas Jossier (FRA)	Retired
DNF	IMOCA 60	CAN80	Canada Ocean Racing	Clarke	IMOCA 60	18.28	Scott Shawyer (CAN); Martin Strömberg	Retired
DNF	IMOCA 60	FRA59	For People		Koch-Finot	18.28	Thomas Ruyant (FRA); Morgan Lagraviere (FRA)	Retired
DNS	IRC Super Zero	GBR8728R	Notorious	Mark Mills	Mini Maxi 72	21.95	Peter Morton (GBR)	Did Not Start
DNS	IRC 1	NED8254	Barcarolle 2	J&J	Salona 42	12.73	Jaap Gelling (NED); Coen Bouhuys	Did Not Start
DNS	IRC 2 Two Handed	NED1409	Il Corvo	Valer	JPK 10.30	10.34	Roeland Franssens (NED); Astrid de Vin	Did Not Start
DNS	IRC 3 Two Handed	FRA38967	Kia Ora	Valer	JPK 10.10	10.04	Olivier Hays (FRA); Maxime Lemesle	Did Not Start
DNS	IRC 4	GBR8274	Machismo II	Thomas	Sigma 38	11.55	Tim Levett (GBR)	Did Not Start
DNS	IRC 4 Two Handed	NED7488	Brunorskip	Finot Conq	Beneteau First 31	9.61	Martin–Jan Strebe (NED) & Freek Strebe (NED)	Did Not Start

Notes

^1 – The yacht was given a 120 minutes penalty to be added onto their elapsed time by the International Jury due to breaching Sailing Instruction 1.6 (Starting Procedure) by crossing the starting line from the pre-start side to the on course side less than 30 seconds before the race started.
^2 – The yacht was given a 10% penalty to be added onto their elapsed time by the International Jury due to breaching Sailing Instruction 1.7/16/A5 (Traffic Separation Scheme) by sailing into the TSS Zone off Fastnet Rock during the race.
^3 – The yacht was given a 10% penalty to be added onto their elapsed time by the International Jury due to breaching Sailing Instruction 1.7/16/A5 (Traffic Separation Scheme) by sailing into the TSS Zone off the West of the Isles of Scilly during the race.
^4 – The yacht was given a 10% penalty to be added onto their elapsed time by the International Jury due to breaching Sailing Instruction 1.7/16/A5 (Traffic Separation Scheme) by sailing into the TSS Zone off Land's End during the race.
^5 – The yacht was given a 270 minutes redress to be subtracted off their elapsed time under RRS 62 by the International Jury due to an incident where their provided assistance to the crew members of Vari after the boat sunk on the first night of the race.
^6 – The yacht was given 2 x 10% penalty to be added onto their elapsed time by the International Jury due to breaching Sailing Instruction 1.7/16/A5 (Traffic Separation Scheme) by sailing into the TSS Zones off the West of the Isles of Scilly and off Fastnet Rock during the race.
^7 – The yacht was given 3 x 10% penalty to be added onto their elapsed time by the International Jury due to breaching Sailing Instruction 1.7/16/A5 (Traffic Separation Scheme) by sailing into the TSS Zones off Land's End twice and off the West of the Isles of Scilly once during the race.

=== Monohull Overall Handicap ===
Pos	Division	Sail Number	Yacht	Country	Yacht Type	LOA (Metres)	Skipper	Corrected time d:hh:mm:ss
1	IRC Zero	CAY52	Caro	Switzerland	Botin TP52	15.90	Max Klink	3:19:22:29
2	IRC Super Zero	NED1	Team Jajo	United States	Farr Volvo Ocean 65	20.37	Clarke Murphy	3:21:33:11
3	IRC Zero	60564	Warrior Won	United States	Judel Vrolijk TP52	15.85	Chris Sheehan	3:21:58:18
4	IRC Super Zero	POL2	Wind Whisper	Poland	Farr Volvo Ocean 65	20.37	Pablo Arrarte	4:02:02:16 ^{1}
5	IRC Zero	FRA830	Albator	France	Nivelt NMD 43	13.07	Philippe Frantz	4:06:05:40
6	IRC Super Zero	USA2872	Lucky	United States	Juan-K 27m Canting Maxi	27.00	Bryon Ehrhart	4:09:13:04
7	IRC Zero	BEL5012	Balthasar	Belgium	Juan-K Swan 50 OD	15.24	Louis Balcaen	4:12:39:38
8	IRC 1	FRA38568	Pintia	(France)	Johnstone J133	13.11	Gilles Fournier; Corinne Migraine	4:13:34:42
9	IRC Zero	GBR2747R	Ino Noir	(United Kingdom) Great Britain	Carkeek 45	13.70	James Neville	4:14:37:14
10	IRC 1	GBR888X	Sunrise III	(United Kingdom) Great Britain	Valer JPK 11.80	11.80	Tom Kneen	4:14:55:04
11	IRC Zero	H700	Stormvogel	(United Kingdom) Great Britain	Vanderstadt 73 Ketch	22.60	Ermanno Traverso; Tom Ripard	4:15:42:25
12	IRC 1	GBR6712R	Dawn Treader	(United Kingdom) Great Britain	Valer JPK 11.80	11.80	Ed Bell	4:15:42:53
13	IRC 3 Two Handed	FRA37454	Les P'tits Doudous en Duo	France	Valer JPK 10.10	10.04	Romain Gibon; Alban Mesnil	4:15:51:21
14	IRC Zero	GBR3875X	Phosphorus II	(United Kingdom) Great Britain	Nivelt Archambault A13	13.10	Mark Emerson	4:16:04:26
15	IRC Zero	FRA8668	Teasing Machine	France	Nivelt Muratet NMYD 54	16.50	Eric de Turckheim	4:16:07:49
16	IRC 3 Two Handed	FRA43683	Tracass	France	Valer JPK 10.10	10.04	Loeiz Cadiou	4:16:08:52
17	IRC 2 Two Handed	FRA53162	Juzzy	France	Valer JPK 10.30	10.34	Thomas Bonnier; David Prono	4:16:28:14
18	IRC 1	FRA53081	Cocody	France	Valer JPK 11.80	11.80	Richard Fromentin	4:16:31:39
19	IRC 3 Two Handed	FRA53114	Adeosys	France	Valer JPK 10.10	10.04	Ludovic Menahes; David Le Goff	4:16:33:36
20	IRC Zero	NED20002	Boudragon	Netherlands	Farr Volvo 60	19.38	Hans Bouscholte	4:16:56:11
21	IRC 1	GER7759	Ginkgo	Germany	Humphreys 39	11.72	Dirk Clasen	4:17:23:48
22	IRC 4	FRA17815	Sun Hill III	France	Judel Vrolijk Dehler 33 CR	9.96	François Charles	4:17:23:50
23	IRC Zero	FRA53028	Lady First 3	France	Juan-K Simeone Mylius 60	18.50	Jean-Pierre Dréau	4:17:30:09
24	IRC 2 Two Handed	FRA53239	Axe Sail	France	Johnstone J99	9.90	Maxime Mesnil; Hugo Feydit	4:17:50:30
25	IRC 3 Two Handed	FRA35289	Cora	(United Kingdom) Great Britain	Andrieu Jeanneau Sunfast 3200 R	9.78	Tim Goodhew; Kelvin Matthews	4:18:07:22
26	IRC 2	FRA53144	Karavel	France	Valer JPK 10.80	10.80	Frederic Nouel; Denis Lazat	4:18:12:32
27	IRC 2 Two Handed	USA 68900	Red Ruby	United States	Andrieu Jeanneau Sunfast 3300	9.99	Christina & Justin Wolfe	4:18:15:44
28	IRC 2	FRA9624	Hey Jude	France	Johnstone J120	12.19	Philippe Girardin	4:18:29:51
29	IRC 3	FRA34978	Locmalo	France	Joubert Nivelt Archambault 35	10.59	Jérôme Fournier Le Ray	4:18:39:18
30	IRC 3	NED9469	Fever	Netherlands	Johnstone J35	10.82	Simeon Tienpont	4:18:40:59
31	IRC 2 Two Handed	GBR2095R	Surf	(United Kingdom) Great Britain	Andrieu Jeanneau Sunfast 3300	9.99	Adrian Dyball; Ben Palmer	4:18:41:37
32	IRC 3 Two Handed	FRA9210	Delnic	France	Valer JPK 10.10	10.04	Benoit Rousselin; Quentin Riché	4:18:47:23
33	IRC 2 Two Handed	GBR1663R	Chilli Pepper	(United Kingdom) Great Britain	Andrieu Jeanneau Sunfast 3300	9.99	Jim & Ellie Driver	4:18:48:09
34	IRC 1 Two Handed	FRA346	Lann Ael 3	France	Manuard Nivelt MN35	10.60	Didier Gaudoux	4:19:10:34
35	IRC 2 Two Handed	FRA53189	Festa 2	France	Andrieu Jeanneau Sunfast 3300	9.99	Jean Francois Hamon; Alex Ozon	4:19:26:19
36	IRC 2 Two Handed	FRA53131	Mecanique Expertises	France	Valer JPK 10.30	10.34	Gerard Quenot; Luc Fourichon	4:19:27:24
37	IRC 3 Two Handed	AUS99	Disko Trooper_Contender Sailcloth	Australia	Johnstone J99	9.90	Jules Hall; Jan Scholten	4:19:34:14
38	IRC 2 Two Handed	GBR4436L	Mzungu!	(United Kingdom) Great Britain	Valer JPK 10.30	10.34	Sam White; Sam North	4:19:38:32
39	IRC 3 Two Handed	GER7291	Sharifa	Germany	Valer JPK 10.10	10.04	Rasmus Töpsch; Bertil Balser	4:19:41:31
40	IRC 2 Two Handed	GBR8438R	Orbit	(United Kingdom) Great Britain	Andrieu Jeanneau Sunfast 3300	9.99	Dan & Zeb Fellows	4:19:46:24
41	IRC 2 Two Handed	GBR8657L	Bellino	(United Kingdom) Great Britain	Andrieu Jeanneau Sunfast 3600	10.80	Rob Craigie; Deb Fish	4:19:49:40
42	IRC 1	FRA36777	Codiam	France	J&J Grand Soleil 43	12.92	Jean Claude Nicoleau; Nicolas Loday	4:19:53:10
43	IRC 1	FRA43857	L'Ange de Milon	France	Valer Milon 41	12.48	Jacques Pelletier	4:20:03:55
44	IRC 3	ESP10682	Gorilon	Spain	Johnstone J99	9.90	Juanon Bedia	4:20:08:10
45	IRC 2 Two Handed	FRA43831	Timeline	France	Valer JPK 10.80	10.80	Marc Alperovitch; Jerome Huillard	4:20:18:20
46	IRC 3 Two Handed	FRA38308	Kurun	France	Valer JPK 10.10	10.04	Patrick & Maxime Paul	4:20:19:04
47	IRC Zero	FIN1527R	Tulikettu	Finland	Welbourn Infiniti TP52	15.85	Arto Linnervuo	4:20:46:38
48	IRC 2	GBR8936R	Black Sheep	(United Kingdom) Great Britain	Andrieu Jeanneau Sunfast 3600	10.80	Jake Carter	4:20:48:39
49	IRC 2 Two Handed	FRA43853	Solenn for Pure Ocean	France	Valer JPK 10.80	10.80	Ludovic Gerard; Nicolas Brossay	4:20:55:46
50	IRC 4 Two Handed	FRA27550	Elma	France	Valer JPK 9.60	9.60	Marc Willame; Antoine Jeu	4:21:08:08
51	IRC 4	GBR8338	With Alacrity	(United Kingdom) Great Britain	Thomas Sigma 38	11.55	Chris Choules	4:21:21:05
52	IRC 2 Two Handed	GBR776	Vela Roja	Germany	Valer JPK 10.30	10.34	Christian Teichmann; Hugh Brayshaw	4:21:31:08
53	IRC 2	GBR1815X	Fujitsu British Soldier	(United Kingdom) Great Britain	Andrieu Jeanneau Sunfast 3600	10.80	Henry Foster	4:21:40:35
54	IRC 2	GBR7383R	Puma	France	Stimson Reflex 38	11.58	Jérôme Desvaux	4:21:44:47
55	IRC 2	IRL2129	Nieulargo	(Republic of Ireland) Ireland	Botin Carkeek Grand Soleil 40 B+C	12.12	Denis Murphy	4:21:46:39
56	IRC 3	FRA43904	Lemancello	France	Andrieu Jeanneau Sunfast 3200	9.78	Py Pascal; Franck Aussedat	4:22:11:01
57	IRC 1	GBR2664R	Darkwood	(Republic of Ireland) Ireland	Johnstone J121	12.19	Michael O'Donnell	4:22:11:11
58	IRC 1	GBR390X	Xanaboo	(United Kingdom) Great Britain	Nivelt JND 39	11.77	Bruce Huber; Hugh Doherty	4:22:44:16
59	IRC 3 Two Handed	FRA36865	Coeur de Chauffe 3	France	Andrieu Jeanneau Sunfast 3200	9.78	Henri Laurent; Loïc Gelebart	4:22:59:16
60	IRC 2	GBR3600X	Killing Time	Guernsey	Andrieu Jeanneau Sunfast 3600	10.80	Alastair Bisson	4:23:01:09
61	IRC 1	NED8935	Moana	Netherlands	Johnstone J122e	12.20	Frans van Cappelle	4:23:02:31
62	IRC 3 Two Handed	GBR958R	Jangada	(United Kingdom) Great Britain	Valer JPK 10.10	10.04	Richard & Sophie Palmer	4:23:10:21
63	IRC 1 Two Handed	FRA28	Tuf Tuf Tuf	France	Lombard Figaro 2	10.09	Pascal Tuffier; Xavier Decosse	4:23:11:58
64	IRC 1	GBR1428R	Rogan Josh	(United Kingdom) Great Britain	Farr Beneteau First 40	12.20	Richard Powell	4:23:04:14
65	IRC 2	GBR2627R	Lord of the Dance	(United Kingdom) Great Britain	Andrieu Jeanneau Sunfast 3300	9.99	Grzegorz Kalinecki	4:23:40:07
66	IRC 3	GBR9588R	Jacana	(United Kingdom) Great Britain	Johnstone J105	10.50	Connie Stevens	4:23:52:00
67	IRC 3	FRA1092	Blouna	France	Johnstone J109	10.74	Francois-Xavier Mahon; Jean Philippe	5:00:23:32
68	IRC 3 Two Handed	FRA37568	Papillon	France	Valer JPK 10.10	10.04	Alexis Vaganay; Arnaud Minvielle	5:00:23:36
69	IRC 3	NED101	Sailselect	Netherlands	Judel Vrolijk Varianta 37	11.27	Jeroen Koninkx	5:00:26:31
70	IRC 2	NED9102	Narwal	Netherlands	Johnstone J112e	11.00	Ubbo Neisingh	5:00:33:51
71	IRC 2	GBR5591L	One Way	(United Kingdom) Great Britain	Andrieu Jeanneau Sunfast 3600	10.80	Dan Rigden; David Melville	5:00:36:48
72	IRC 2	GBR927R	Atomic	(United Kingdom) Great Britain	Andrieu Jeanneau Sunfast 3300	9.99	Chris Agace	5:00:39:51
73	IRC 2	GBR833X	Hooligan VIII	(United Kingdom) Great Britain	Andrieu Jeanneau Sunfast 3300	9.99	Ed Broadway	5:01:01:43
74	IRC 1	GBR1X	Faenol	(United Kingdom) Great Britain	Maunard Beneteau First 36	11.00	Steven Godard; Sam Manuard	5:01:06:41
75	IRC 1	GBR942R	Bulldog	(United Kingdom) Great Britain	Johnstone J122	12.20	Derek Shakespeare	5:01:07:35
76	IRC 2 Two Handed	POL80	Pneuma	Poland	Valer JPK 10.30	10.34	Andrzej Rozycki; Pawel Tryzna	5:01:14:36
77	IRC 3 Two Handed	GBR9779T	Jago	(United Kingdom) Great Britain	Johnstone J109	10.74	Mike Yates; Will Holland	5:01:42:09
78	IRC 4 Two Handed	GBR360	Flycatcher of Yar	(United Kingdom) Great Britain	Sparkman & Stephens Contessa 38	11.72	Henry & Edward Clay	5:01:45:11
79	IRC 3	FRA34697	Kiralamur	France	Andrieu Jeanneau Sunfast 3200	9.78	Pierre Leferve	5:01:53:07
80	IRC 3	GER4326	Pinatz	Germany	Bern Comfortina 38	11.66	Christian Heermann	5:02:23:25
81	IRC 2	GBR3438L	Jameerah	(United Kingdom) Great Britain	Johnstone J120	12.19	Simon Ruffles	5:02:28:29
82	IRC 1	GBR9244R	Samatom	(United Kingdom) Great Britain	Polli Grand Soleil 44 Race	13.40	Robert Rendell; Conor Fogerty	5:02:31:12
83	IRC 3	GBR1575L	Pure Attitude	(United Kingdom) Great Britain	Jeppesen X37	11.35	Thomas Wilson	5:02:38:30
84	IRC 2	GBR1355R	Lulotte	(United Kingdom) Great Britain	Sparkman & Stephens Swan 55 Yawl	16.75	Ben Morris	5:02:44:11
84	IRC 1	GBR4669R	Pata Negra	(United Kingdom) Great Britain	Lombard 46	13.88	Andrew & Sam Hall	5:02:51:00
85	IRC 2	USA74434	Hiro Maru	United States	Sparkman & Stephens S&S 49 Custom	15.05	Hiroshi Nakajima	5:02:54:32
87	IRC 2	IRL5991	Prime Suspect	(Republic of Ireland) Ireland	Mills 36 Custom	10.99	Keith Miller	5:03:15:06
88	IRC 1	BEL4701	Moana	Belgium	Farr Beneteau First 47.7	14.90	Mathieu Goubau	5:03:16:56
89	IRC 4	BEL38	Leda	Belgium	Sparkman & Stephens Swan 38	11.66	Jan Toussein	5:03:25:12
90	IRC 2	GBR711N	Kimanche Eve II	(United Kingdom) Great Britain	Valer JPK 10.80	10.80	Mark Franklin; Simon Pettitt	5:03:42:56
91	IRC 1	8565	Eve	Australia	Sparkman & Stephens Swan 65	19.68	Benjamin Roulant	5:03:48:43
92	IRC 1	SWE777	Solong	Sweden	Simonis-Voogd Dehler 45	13.69	Johan Bratt	5:04:01:56
93	IRC 3	IRL1990	Imp	(Republic of Ireland) Ireland	Holland 39	12.03	George Radley	5:04:38:11
94	IRC 3	NED8244	Jalla! Jalla!	Netherlands	Johnstone J105	10.50	Michel Visser	5:05:05:47
95	IRC 4	GER6791	Dickebank	Germany	Koopmans Victoire 1200	12.01	Wolfgang Doczyck	5:05:08:18
96	IRC 1	LAT909	Orange Mecanix 2	France	Jeppesen XP44	13.30	Maxime de Mareuil	5:05:17:02
97	IRC 4	NED5859	Vanilla	Netherlands	Jeppesen X332	10.06	Niek Spiljard	5:05:40:12
98	IRC 1	SWE918	Garm	Sweden	Valer JPK 11.80	11.80	Per Roman	5:05:58:23
99	IRC 1	FRA18	Precitechnqiue Makarios	France	VPLP Figaro 3	9.76	Alexandre Rosenblatt	5:06:03:41
100	IRC 1	GBR4778R	EH01	(United Kingdom) Great Britain	Farr Beneteau 47.7	14.50	Neil Maher	5:06:03:50
101	IRC 3	FRA38387	Miss Leading	France	Valer JPK 10.10	10.04	Fred Guillemot	5:06:13:05
102	IRC 1	GBR1479T	Baraka	United States	Frers Nautor Swan 53	16.08	Ben Day	5:06:41:23
103	IRC 4	GBR8396	Sam	(United Kingdom) Great Britain	Thomas Sigma 38	11.55	Peter Hopps	5:06:58:15
104	IRC 4 Two Handed	GBR6388T	Marta	(United Kingdom) Great Britain	Thomas Sigma 38	11.55	Brian Skeet; Nicolas Malapert	5:07:13:33
105	IRC 3 Two Handed	GBR4799R	Jiro	(United Kingdom) Great Britain	Johnstone J99	9.90	Mark Kendall; Tom Holloway	5:07:32:20
106	IRC 3	GBR8809R	Mojo Risin	(United Kingdom) Great Britain	Johnstone J109	10.74	Rob Cotterill	5:07:58:26
107	IRC 3	GBR6939R	Finally	(United Kingdom) Great Britain	Humphreys Elan 350	10.60	Paul Kitteringham	5:08:06:58
108	IRC 3	GBR9265R	Boracic	(United Kingdom) Great Britain	Botin Carkeek Grand Soleil 37	11.30	Calum McKie	5:08:10:14
109	IRC 1	FRA27950	Acalina3	France	Jeppesen X50	15.20	Henri & Fabien Baetz	5:08:11:56
110	IRC 1 Two Handed	MLT47	Otra Vez	Netherlands	Johnstone J122	12.20	Uneco de Meester; Hendrik Jan Molenaar	5:08:23:26
111	IRC 4	A19	Maluka	Australia	Gale Ranger 30	9.01	Sean Langman	5:08:28:48
112	IRC 2 Two Handed	FRA43673	Dare Dare	France	Nivelt Archambault A35R	10.58	Michel Darnaudguilhem; Christopher Bru	5:08:59:27
113	IRC 2	GER7265	Loewe von Bremen	Germany	Andrieu Jeanneau Sunfast 3600	10.80	Frederick Nabor	5:09:05:28
114	IRC 1	GER8210	Mariejo	Germany	Finot-Conq Pogo 44	12.80	Tobias Brinkmann; Martin Buck	5:09:16:51
115	IRC 3	GBR6809R	Jybe Talkin	(United Kingdom) Great Britain	Johnstone J109	10.74	Chris Burleigh	5:09:34:25
116	IRC Zero	AUS7742	Kialoa II	Australia	Sparkman & Stephens S&S 73 Yawl	23.00	Patrick Broughton	5:09:44:04
117	IRC 1	FRA9795	Endless Summer	France	Balta 44	13.50	Manuel Da Rocha	5:10:12:19
118	IRC 3 Two Handed	GBR2842L	Sun Kosi	(United Kingdom) Great Britain	Andrieu Jeanneau Sunfast 3200	9.78	Miles Delap; Keith Oliver	5:10:35:07
119	IRC 1	GBR597R	Itma	(United Kingdom) Great Britain	Jeppesen X50	15.24	Tom Scott	5:10:42:21
120	IRC 3	GER655	Snifix Dry	Germany	Peterson 43	13.04	Erhard Zimmermann; Wilhelm Demel	5:10:58:43
121	IRC 4	GBR8354	Spirit	(United Kingdom) Great Britain	Thomas Sigma 38	11.55	Paul Scott; Geoff Lynch	5:11:15:24
122	IRC 1	POL14833	Fujimo AB	Poland	Judel Vrolijk 44	13.35	Tomasz Kosobucki	5:11:21:31
123	IRC 4 Two Handed	GBR3936	British Beagle	(United Kingdom) Great Britain	Sigma Thomas 36	10.98	Charles Emmett; Tim Winsey	5:11:25:40
124	IRC 1	BEL5355	Pinta 42	Belgium	Judel Vrolijk Rodman 42	12.40	Dirk Hellemans	5:11:53:00
125	IRC 2	GBR6593T	Petruchio	(United Kingdom) Great Britain	Farr Beneteau 40.7	11.92	Ray Campion	5:11:55:51
126	IRC 4 Two Handed	GBR9700X	Raging Bull 3	(United Kingdom) Great Britain	Johnstone J97	9.61	Tim Tolcher; Will Deutsch	5:11:59:09
127	IRC 3 Two Handed	GBR8956R	Delay No More	(United Kingdom) Great Britain	Andrieu Jeanneau Sunfast 3200	9.78	Nigel Davis; Nick Southward	5:12:25:01
128	IRC 1	GER468	Germania VI	Germany	Sparkman & Stephens S&S 73	22.24	Jens Seiderer	5:12:37:26
129	IRC 1	ESP 3880	Mylla	Spain	Jeppesen XP38	11.58	Javier Sanchez Lamelas	5:13:00:36
130	IRC 3 Two Handed	BEL1888	Propaganda 3	France	Molino MMW 33	9.96	Benoit Cornet	5:13:01:25
131	IRC 4	GBR3950	Woozle Hunter	(United Kingdom) Great Britain	Thomas Sigma 33	9.87	Alex Thomas	5:13:02:00
132	IRC 2	GBR7381R	Cougar of Cowes	(United Kingdom) Great Britain	Stimpson Reflex 38	11.58	Ruadraidh Plummer	5:13:04:11
133	IRC Zero	GER7007	Stortebeker	Germany	Carkeek 47	14.30	Max Gartner	5:13:31:00
134	IRC Super Zero	AUT1	Sisi-Kraken Travel x Austrian Ocean Racing	Austria	Farr Volvo Ocean 65	20.37	Gerwin Jansen	5:13:45:46
135	IRC 1	BEL9852	Ragazza IV	Belgium	Mills 37	11.12	Jan Gabriel	5:14:02:03
136	IRC 2	GBR8872R	Challenger 2	(United Kingdom) Great Britain	Humphreys Challenge Business 72	21.63	John Farndell	5:14:25:17
137	IRC 1	GBR2993L	Minnie the Minx	(United Kingdom) Great Britain	Farr Beneteau First 40	12.24	Richard Catchpole; Jen Moorby	5:14:35:55
138	IRC Zero	GBR2289L	Catzero	(United Kingdom) Great Britain	Humphreys Challenge 72	21.63	Danny Watson; Rachael Sprot	5:14:37:03
139	IRC 3 Two Handed	FIN709	Irie	Finland	Johnstone J109	10.74	Sanna Moliis; Julius Haartti	5:14:52:32
140	IRC 1	FRA45612	Eilean	Austria	Finot Conq Pogo 36	10.86	Markus Schwarz; Thomas Zajac	5:14:55:40
141	IRC 3	GBR8876T	Panther	Germany	Johnstone J105	10.57	Dr. Michael Rietz; Bernd Kirchberg	5:15:14:35
142	IRC Zero	DEN35551	Palby Marine	Denmark	Elliott 35 Super Sport	10.61	Michael Mollmann	5:15:55:27
143	IRC Zero	GER6000	Walross 4	Germany	Nissen 56	16.99	Konrad Sagebiel	5:16:22:35
144	IRC 3	4300C	Reindeer	(United Kingdom) Great Britain	Sparkman & Stephens Swan 43	13.07	Jack Meredith	5:16:40:23
145	IRC 3	NED9675	Frans Duvel II	Netherlands	Strahlmann Finngulf 37	11.25	Coen Piccardt Brouwer	5:16:57:47
146	IRC Zero	GER6300	Haspa Hamburg	Germany	Judel Vrolijk TP52	15.85	Gerrit Rampendahl	5:17:01:34
147	IRC Zero	GBR715R	Pegasus of Northumberland	(United Kingdom) Great Britain	Shilvington Road Open 50	15.24	Chris Briggs; Jon McColl	5:17:04:47
148	IRC 3 Two Handed	IOM7003	Polished Manx 2	Isle of Man	Farr Beneteau 40.7	11.92	Kuba Szymanski; Maciej Lato	5:17:16:20
149	IRC 3	GBR3737L	Unruly	(United Kingdom) Great Britain	Jeppesen X37	11.35	Charles Bull	5:17:47:15
150	IRC 2	USA51020	Momentum	United States	McCurdy Rhodes Hinckley Sou'wester 51	15.34	Paul Kanev; Ken Reilley	5:18:06:01
151	IRC 1	SWE13	C-Me	Sweden	Farr Beneteau First 40 CR	12.24	Håkan Grönvall; Olof Granander	5:18:35:16
152	IRC 3	GBR922R	Juno	(United Kingdom) Great Britain	Jeppesen X34	10.36	Simon Bottoms	5:18:49:56
153	IRC 3	GBR8367T	Red Hawk	(United Kingdom) Great Britain	Farr Beneteau First 36	10.68	James Armstrong; Jenn Ramsdale	5:19:00:21
154	IRC 4	GBR292	Amokura	(United Kingdom) Great Britain	Shepherd 50 Classic Yawl	15.32	Paul Moxon	5:19:35:53
155	IRC 1	BEL450	Aquavit	Belgium	Briand Beneteau First 45	13.68	Franklin Aquavit; Franklin Wagemans	5:19:54:50
156	IRC 1	SVK93	Sabre II	Slovakia	Lombard Akilaria 40	12.19	Miroslav Jakubcik; Marek Culen	5:19:55:10
157	IRC 4	49	Hultaj	Poland	Finot Beret Figaro 1	9.15	Szymon Kuczyński; Anna Jastrzębska	5:19:59:47
158	IRC 1	GBR8873R	Challenger 3	(United Kingdom) Great Britain	Humphreys Challenge Business 72	21.63	Ricky Chambers	5:20:30:48
159	IRC 3	GBR9941T	Ju Kyu	(United Kingdom) Great Britain	Johnstone J109	10.74	Dr. Peter Rowe; Jon Rowe	5:20:35:49
160	IRC 3 Two Handed	IOM8931R	AJ Wanderlust	United States	Briand Jeanneau 45.2 Sun Odyssey	13.80	Charlene Howard; Robert Drummond	5:20:58:21
161	IRC 4	GBR9967Y	Ugly Duckling	(United Kingdom) Great Britain	Sparkman & Stephens Sagitta 35	10.52	George Beevor	5:21:00:14
162	IRC Zero	FRA43534	Challenge Ocean	France	Davidson Volvo 60	19.50	Valdo Dhoyer	5:21:01:09
163	IRC 2	GBR5055L	IO of Dartmouth	(United Kingdom) Great Britain	Macmillan Spirit 50 CR	14.98	Stephen Brookson	5:21:32:32
164	IRC 4 Two Handed	FRA34824	Casamyas	France	Valer JPK 9.60	9.60	Samuel Duménil; Antoine Runet	5:22:30:14
165	IRC 1	GBR4018L	Jazz	(United Kingdom) Great Britain	Farr Beneteau First 40	12.24	Mitchel Fowler	5:22:43:28
166	IRC Zero	GBR9353T	CV3 Adventurous	(United Kingdom) Great Britain	Dubois Cilpper 68	20.77	Dale Smyth	5:22:57:34
167	IRC 1	GBR8874R	Challenger 4	(United Kingdom) Great Britain	Humphreys Challenge Business 72	21.63	Sue Geary	5:23:05:45
168	IRC 4 Two Handed	GBR4350L	Felix	Austria	Jeppesen X332	10.06	Christoph Friedrich; Oleg Lebedev	5:23:08:10
169	IRC 4	GBR8756T	Nimrod	(United Kingdom) Great Britain	Lombard Jeanneau Sunfast 35	10.43	Paul-Love Williams	5:23:31:53
170	IRC 2	NED8489	Windshift	Netherlands	Judel Vrolijk V44 Performance	13.10	Remco Schilderinck	5:23:45:07
171	IRC 4	IRL3852	Blue Oyster	(Republic of Ireland) Ireland	Holman Pye Oyster 37	11.26	Noel Coleman	6:00:43:24
172	IRC 1	SUI4777	Kali	Switzerland	Farr Beneteau First 47.7	14.50	Benedikt Clauberg	6:01:02:09
173	IRC 1	BEL11111	Djinn	Belgium	Johnstone J111	11.15	Sylvain Duprey	6:01:03:31
174	IRC 1	FRA45011	Egregore	France	Finot Conq Pogo 1250	12.19	Jean-Baptiste Fédide	6:01:49:52
175	IRC Zero	GBR809	Lutine	(United Kingdom) Great Britain	Jeppesen X55	16.83	James Close	6:02:20:49
176	IRC 1	GBR1419L	Sidney II	(United Kingdom) Great Britain	Judel Vrolijk Grand Soleil 50	14.90	Bob Mechem; Tanya Sullivan	6:02:41:10
177	IRC 1	FRA43867	Albatros	France	Thomas Challenge 67	20.42	Etienne Boizet	6:03:36:40
178	IRC 2	GBR1415L	Mad Dash	(United Kingdom) Great Britain	Humphries Elan 410	12.28	Phil Morgan	6:04:26:47
179	IRC 2	GBR1321L	Escapado	(United Kingdom) Great Britain	Farr Beneteau First 40.7	11.92	Germaine Williams	6:05:10:58
180	IRC 2	GBR8900R	Majic 2	Guernsey	Johnstone J120	12.19	Ron Wilkes-Green	6:05:46:47
181	IRC 3	GER6668	Toke	Germany	Humphries Elan 360	10.60	Nora M. Puls	6:06:02:58
182	IRC 4	FR14	Fulmar Fever	(Republic of Ireland) Ireland	Dubois Westerly Fulmar 32	9.71	Robert Marchant	6:06:15:08
183	IRC Zero	GBR9357T	CV8 Tenacious	(United Kingdom) Great Britain	Dubois Cilpper 68	20.77	Sophie O'Neill	6:06:27:13
184	IRC 4	IRL638	State O'Chassis	(Republic of Ireland) Ireland	Thomas Sigma 38	11.55	Mike Murphy; Kevin Buckley	6:06:45:52
185	IRC 1	GBR6840R	Lancelot II	(United Kingdom) Great Britain	Farr Beneteau First 40	12.24	John Gillard	6:07:11:02
186	IRC 1	GBR4019N	Tango	(United Kingdom) Great Britain	Farr Beneteau First 40	12.24	Giles Bancroft	6:07:11:11
187	IRC 1	GBR1601R	Jeu D'Esprit	(United Kingdom) Great Britain	Johnstone J160	16.10	Henry Ayres	6:07:34:21
188	IRC Zero	GBR9351T	CV2 Ambitious	(United Kingdom) Great Britain	Dubois Cilpper 68	20.77	Nick Graham	6:08:21:43
189	IRC 1	FIN15682	Eira	Finland	Frers Swan 51	15.62	Sebastian & Pontus Gylling	6:09:32:39
190	IRC 3 Two Handed	GBR6777	Bespoke	(United Kingdom) Great Britain	Humphries 30 Modified	9.35	Neal Brewer; Andrew Baker	6:10:00:54
191	IRC 3	FRA170	Ioalla V	France	Andrieu Jeanneau Sunfast 3200	9.78	Yvan Le Trequesser	6:10:31:24
192	IRC 4	7	Le Loup Rouge	France	Illinworth Primrose 36 Maica RORC	11.06	Pierre Le Loup Rouge; Thierry Regnault	6:11:05:51
193	IRC Zero	GER333	Atlantix Express	Germany	Petit Open 45	13.71	Sascha Schmid	6:11:21:10
194	IRC 1	GBR7451R	Promise 3	(United Kingdom) Great Britain	Farr Beneteau First 47.7	14.50	Steve Robinson; John R. Williams	6:12:52:24
195	IRC 2	GBR5358L	HMSTC Eagle of Hornet	(United Kingdom) Great Britain	Bern Comfortina 42	12.80	David Cummings	6:13:25:59
196	IRC Zero	GBR9358T	CV9 Courageous	(United Kingdom) Great Britain	Dubois Cilpper 68	20.77	Alex Laline	6:15:10:02
197	IRC 3	NED9168	Dansen Aan Zee	Netherlands	Judel Vrolijk Hanse 400	11.99	Gian Paolo Imponente	6:17:56:00
198	IRC 1	GBR1232T	Phantom	(United Kingdom) Great Britain	Laurent-Giles 44 One Off	13.34	Ashley Weston	6:23:35:23
199	IRC 2	GBR5779L	Cork Malt II	(United Kingdom) Great Britain	Berret Racoupeau Beneteau Oceanis 50	14.75	Mart Andrews	7:02:47:44
200	IRC 3	GBR7005R	Trojan	(United Kingdom) Great Britain	Johnstone J109	10.74	Andy Motion	7:05:36:31
201	IRC 2	5815L	Emma	(United Kingdom) Great Britain	Racoupeau Garcia Exploration 52	15.84	Rebecca Hirsch; Clothilde-Marie Bernard	7:06:22:42
DNF	IRC Super Zero	NED 8	Green Dragon	Switzerland	Reichel Pugh Volvo Open 70	21.50	Johannes Schwarz; Cathal Mahon	Retired
DNF	IRC Zero	GER7323	Milan	France	Farr STP 65	19.99	Pascal Oddo	Retired
DNF	IRC Zero	FRA2025	Spirit of Lorina	France	Botin 65	19.99	Jean Pierre Barjon; Gildas Philippe	Retired
DNF	IRC Zero	GBR7017R	Black Pearl	Germany	Botin 56	17.10	Stefan Jentzsch	Retired
DNF	IRC Zero	SWE520	Rán	Sweden	Carkeek CF 520	15.86	Niklas Zennstrom	Retired
DNF	IRC Zero	GBR4321R	Oystercatcher XXXV	(United Kingdom) Great Britain	Carkeek CF 520	15.86	Richard Matthews	Retired
DNF	IRC Zero	ITA17565	Hägar V	Italy	Miesbauer Scuderia 65	20.06	Aldo Scuderi	Retired
DNF	IRC Zero	60006	Venomous	(United Kingdom) Great Britain	Farr CM60	18.33	James Gair	Retired
DNF	IRC Zero	NOR15731	Enderpearl	Norway	Briand CNB 76	23.17	Kenneth Bjoerklund	Retired
DNF	IRC Zero	GER7722	Elida	Germany	Tison 48 One-Off Racer Cruiser	14.75	Daniel E. Baum	Retired
DNF	IRC Zero	NED17001	Rost-Van Uden Ker 46	Netherlands	Ker 46	14.02	Gerd-Jan Poortman	Retired
DNF	IRC Zero	NED61137	Baraka GP	Netherlands	Ker 43	13.30	Piet, Dirk & Olivier De Graaf	Retired
DNF	IRC Zero	FRA4600	Tonnerre De Glen	France	Ker 46	14.02	Dominique Tian	Retired
DNF	IRC Zero	POL000Q1R	Fast Forward	Poland	Tripp 50	15.36	Marek Wołoszyn	Retired
DNF	IRC Zero	NED66	Red66	Netherlands	Clarke Class 40	12.18	Hans Brouwer	Retired
DNF	IRC Zero	GBR7445R	Amanjiwo	France	Frers 44	13.70	Sebastien Harinkouck; Gaël Reynaud	Retired
DNF	IRC Zero	GBR90	Rock'n'Roll	(United Kingdom) Great Britain	Clarke Jaz 40	12.19	Adanasy Isaev	Retired
DNF	IRC Zero	GBR4512	People	Netherlands	Farr 45	13.80	Joost Smits	Retired
DNF	IRC Zero	SWE4000	Swee	Sweden	Ker 40	12.15	Lars & Birgitta Elfversson	Retired
DNF	IRC Zero	GBR69R	Coco De Mer	(United Kingdom) Great Britain	Frers Swan 62 RS	18.85	Jonathan Butler	Retired
DNF	IRC Zero; Two Handed	NED7576	La Promesse	Netherlands	Morrison Open 40	12.19	JanKees Lampe; Bart Boosman	Retired
DNF	IRC Zero	GBR9356T	CV7 Curious	(United Kingdom) Great Britain	Dubois Cilpper 68	20.77	Nigel Parry	Retired
DNF	IRC Zero	GBR917R	Andrasta	(United Kingdom) Great Britain	Bateson Iceni 39 Custom	11.97	Ben Ibbotson	Retired
DNF	IRC 1	FRA43631	Long Courrier	France	Ker Sydney 43	13.10	Gery Trentesaux	Retired
DNF	IRC 1	GER6009	Leu	France	Judel Vrolijk 45	13.81	Thierry Deseine	Retired
DNF	IRC 1	FRA35921	Akela	France	Brenneur Akela 46	13.99	Hervé & Guillaume d’ Arexy	Retired
DNF	IRC 1	GER6880	Edelweiss	Germany	Lostucci Millenium 40	12.01	Thomas Reinecke	Retired
DNF	IRC 1	FRA45985	Don Papa	Austria	Finot Conq Pogo 44	12.80	Christian Kargl	Retired
DNF	IRC 1 Two Handed	FRA38516	Kazami	France	Finot Pogo 12.50	12.19	Benoît Amalric; Cédric Malengreau	Retired
DNF	IRC 1	FRA43769	Baradoz	France	Finot Pogo 12.50	12.19	Xavier Bellouard	Retired
DNF	IRC 1	GBR1250X	Ca Va	(United Kingdom) Great Britain	Finot Pogo 12.50	12.19	Tony Rayer	Retired
DNF	IRC 1	GBR962R	Mercury	(United Kingdom) Great Britain	Frers Clubswan 42	12.98	Ross Eldred	Retired
DNF	IRC 1	GBR8940R	Espresso Martini Too	(United Kingdom)	Farr 40	12.41	Cameron Davis	Retired
DNF	IRC 1	SA3040	Outlaw	Australia	Peterson Baltic 55	16.70	Campbell Mackie	Retired
DNF	IRC 1	GER4070	Uijuijui	Germany	Harter Rainbow 42	12.83	Maurice Oster	Retired
DNF	IRC 1	GER7504	Juxbox	Germany	Jeppesen X46 Mod	13.99	Ove H. Frabnck	Retired
DNF	IRC 1	FRA53004	Vasco	France	Finot Conq Pogo 36	10.85	Bernard Fondrillon	Retired
DNF	IRC 1	IRL66	Checkmate XX	(Republic of Ireland) Ireland	Briand Beneteau First 50	14.98	Nigel Biggs; David Cullen	Retired
DNF	IRC 1	88	Moonbeam	France	Fife 81 Long Keel Gaff Cutter	24.66	Archie Hinde	Retired
DNF	IRC 1	FRA45313	Izipizi	France	Finot Conq Pogo 36	10.86	Guillaume Ferey	Retired
DNF	IRC 1	FRA43997	Stamina IV	France	Molino MMW 40	11.92	Charlie Ageneau	Retired
DNF	IRC 1	GBR9688R	Dulcissima	France	Johnstone J130	13.08	Hervé Perrein	Retired
DNF	IRC 1	GBR1346R	Belladonna	(United Kingdom) Great Britain	Lostuzzi Grand Soleil 46	14.08	Nick Martin	Retired
DNF	IRC 1	AUT4000	Oida	Austria	Nivelt Archambault A40	11.98	Jamie Townsend	Retired
DNF	IRC 1	FRA157	Fastwave 6	France	Valer JPK 11.80	11.80	Eric Fries	Retired
DNF	IRC 1	GBR60R	Corazon	(United Kingdom) Great Britain	Johnstone J133	13.11	Lawrence Herbert	Retired
DNF	IRC 1	GBR2752R	Sao Jorge	(United Kingdom) Great Britain	Mortain Mavrikios Harmony 52	15.65	Jamie Hembury-Gunn	Retired
DNF	IRC 1	SA2371	Zeus Sailing Adventures	South Africa	Simonis Voogd Fast 42	12.82	Martin Lossie	Retired
DNF	IRC 1 Two Handed	GBR3922R	Jangle	(United Kingdom) Great Britain	Johnstone J122e	12.19	Clive Miles; Will Ayliffe	Retired
DNF	IRC 1	GBR8405R	Olympia's Tigress	(United Kingdom) Great Britain	Farr Beneteau First 40	12.24	Susan Glenny; Jaime Torres	Retired
DNF	IRC 1	GBR724R	40 Love	(United Kingdom) Great Britain	Farr Beneteau First 40	12.24	Edward Harvey; Peter Smith	Retired
DNF	IRC 1	MK6	Galiana WithSecure	Finland	Sparkman & Stephens Swan 55 Yawl	16.73	Tapio Lehtinen; Ville Norra	Retired
DNF	IRC 1	FRA78	SL Energies Groupe Fastwave	France	Johnstone J111	11.15	Laurent Charmy	Retired
DNF	IRC 1	GBR8409R	Galahad of Cowes	(United Kingdom) Great Britain	Farr Beneteau First 40	12.24	Ronan Banim	Retired
DNF	IRC 1	GBR4147L	Zada	(United Kingdom) Great Britain	Farr Beneteau First 40	12.24	Neil O'Leary	Retired
DNF	IRC 1 Two Handed	NED402	Vita	Netherlands	Nivelt Archambault A40 RC	11.98	Martin Hingst; Dennis de Rutter	Retired
DNF	IRC 1	FRA9602	Fauve	France	Felchi Dufour 44	13.35	Yann Chevallier; Jean-Pierre Duclos	Retired
DNF	IRC 1	FRA19349	Ster Wenn V	France	Jeppesen X442	13.53	Pierre Sallenave	Retired
DNF	IRC 1	GBR3923L	Merlin of Cowes	(United Kingdom) Great Britain	Farr Beneteau First 40	12.24	Steve Foster	Retired
DNF	IRC 1	GBR1859L	Fin First Sfida	(United Kingdom) Great Britain	Farr Beneteau First 40	12.24	Gareth Williams	Retired
DNF	IRC 1	GBR2806L	Winston	(United Kingdom) Great Britain	Farr Beneteau First 40 CR	12.24	Chris Brooks	Retired
DNF	IRC 1	FRA35800	Iritis	France	Farr Beneteau First 40	12.24	Dr. Bénic Hervé	Retired
DNF	IRC 1	GBR7408R	Arthur	(United Kingdom) Great Britain	Farr Beneteau First 40	12.24	Verity Rouse	Retired
DNF	IRC 1	GBR1396R	Black Betty	(United Kingdom) Great Britain	Judel Vrolijk Dehler 30 OD	9.14	Ian Griffiths	Retired
DNF	IRC 1	IRL8882	Mynx	(Republic of Ireland) Ireland	Frers Swan 46	14.05	Kenneth Cunnane	Retired
DNF	IRC 1 Two Handed	NED1100	Jaffix	Netherlands	De Ridder FF 1100	11.00	Floris Ingen Housz; Paul Krekel	Retired
DNF	IRC 1 Two Handed	FRA92	Terre d'Enfants sur L'Atlantique	France	Lombard Figaro 2	10.09	Amaury Dumortier; Geoffrey Thiriez	Retired
DNF	IRC 1 Two Handed	FRA80	Elementine	France	Lombard Figaro 2	10.09	Laurent Domenech-Cabaud; Laurent Bory	Retired
DNF	IRC 2	FRA43749	Nutmeg VI	France	Lombard MC34	10.46	Corentin Lognoné	Retired
DNF	IRC 2	GBR1702T	Scarlet Oyster	(United Kingdom) Great Britain	Schumacher Oyster 48 LW	14.61	Ross Applebey; Jules White	Retired
DNF	IRC 2	GBR6504N	Talisman	(United Kingdom) Great Britain	Jones Prima 38	11.60	Simon Harwood	Retired
DNF	IRC 2	GBR6586L	Scream 2	(United Kingdom) Great Britain	Johnstone J120	12.19	Fergus Roper	Retired
DNF	IRC 2 Two Handed	GBR112N	J'Ouvert	(United Kingdom) Great Britain	Johnstone J112e	11.00	Simon Harris; Robert Stevenson	Retired
DNF	IRC 2 Two Handed	GBR914R	Tigris	(United Kingdom) Great Britain	Andrieu Jeanneau Sunfast 3600	10.80	Mike O'Donovan; Gavin Howe	Retired
DNF	IRC 2	GBR7343R	Marco Polo	(United Kingdom) Great Britain	Andrieu Jeanneau Sunfast 3600	10.80	Steve Berry	Retired
DNF	IRC 2	GBR4647R	Galeforce DrivenByNature.nl	(United Kingdom) Great Britain	Farr Beneteau First 40.7	11.92	George Jansen	Retired
DNF	IRC 2 Two Handed	GBR3759L	Jelenko II	(United Kingdom) Great Britain	Andrieu Jeanneau Sunfast 3600	10.80	Joppe Schepers; Jasper Heikens	Retired
DNF	IRC 2	SWE450	Emily of Cowes	(United Kingdom) Great Britain	Humphries Elan 450	13.60	Stefan Kunz	Retired
DNF	IRC 2	GBR503R	May Contain Nuts	(United Kingdom) Great Britain	Corby 34.7	10.38	Kevin Rolfe	Retired
DNF	IRC 2 Two Handed	FRA43713	Vari	France	Andrieu Jeanneau Sunfast 3600	10.80	Yann Jestin; Romain Baggio	Retired
DNF	IRC 2	GBR9043T	Flying Fish	(United Kingdom) Great Britain	Farr Beneteau First 40.7	11.92	Christian Buehrlen	Retired
DNF	IRC 2 Two Handed	FRA53012	Ciao Ciao	France	Andrieu Jeanneau Sunfast 3600	10.80	Paolo & Francesco Mangione	Retired
DNF	IRC 2	GBR8383R	Assassin	(United Kingdom) Great Britain	Jones Prima 38	11.60	Matt Bundell	Retired
DNF	IRC 2 Two Handed	FRA53161	Phu Cam	France	Andrieu Jeanneau Sunfast 3600	10.80	Philippe Viet Triem Tong; Jean-Luc Lagrave	Retired
DNF	IRC 2 Two Handed	FRA39533	Be Happy	France	Andrieu Jeanneau Sunfast 3600	10.80	Frederic Couture; Philippe Gaudru	Retired
DNF	IRC 2 Two Handed	GBR1653R	Ikigai	(United Kingdom) Great Britain	Valer JPK 10.80	10.80	Miles Woodhouse; Dom Hurndall	Retired
DNF	IRC 2	GBR684	Quailo III	(United Kingdom) Great Britain	Wall Nicholson 55	16.40	Andrew Tseng	Retired
DNF	IRC 2	IRL3618	Yoyo	(United Kingdom) Great Britain	Andrieu Jeanneau Sunfast 3600	10.80	Vincent Pietersz	Retired
DNF	IRC 2	FRA53116	Princesse Gotionude II	France	Andrieu Jeanneau Sunfast 3600	10.80	Nicolas Dezeustre	Retired
DNF	IRC 2	USA61183	In Theory	United States	Valer JPK 10.80	10.80	Peter McWhinnie	Retired
DNF	IRC 2 Two Handed	GBR6779R	Kestrel	(United Kingdom) Great Britain	Andrieu Jeanneau Sunfast 3300	9.99	Simon Bamford; Jerome Carson	Retired
DNF	IRC 2 Two Handed	GER8180	Hinden	Germany	Valer JPK 10.30	10.34	Jonas Hallberg; Till Barth	Retired
DNF	IRC 2 Two Handed	USA61287	Sea Bear	(United Kingdom) Great Britain	Andrieu Jeanneau Sunfast 3300	9.99	Peter & Duncan Bacon	Retired
DNF	IRC 2	GER5762	Dantes	Germany	Sparkmans & Stephens Swan 48	14.61	Michael Orgzey	Retired
DNF	IRC 2	FRA9843	Turn Left	France	Valer JPK 10.30	10.34	Pacome Jouany	Retired
DNF	IRC 2 Two Handed	FRA9875	Ladybug 2	France	Valer JPK 10.30	10.34	Tangi Caron; Eric Guigne	Retired
DNF	IRC 2	FRA53229	Reve de Souffle	France	Andrieu Jeanneau Sunfast 3300	9.99	Loic Lecomte	Retired
DNF	IRC 2 Two Handed	GBR795R	Diablo	(United Kingdom) Great Britain	Andrieu Jeanneau Sunfast 3600	10.80	Nick Martin; Calanach Finlayson	Retired
DNF	IRC 2 Two Handed	FRA53197	Mary	France	Valer JPK 10.30	10.34	François Moriceau; Christophe Waubant	Retired
DNF	IRC 2 Two Handed	GBR1583R	Asgard	(United Kingdom) Great Britain	Andrieu Jeanneau Sunfast 3300	9.99	Conor Corson; Matt Bird	Retired
DNF	IRC 2	FRA53192	Moshimoshi	France	Andrieu Jeanneau Sunfast 3300	9.99	Sebastien Saulnier	Retired
DNF	IRC 2 Two Handed	FRA53213	Moustache	France	Andrieu Jeanneau Sunfast 3300	9.99	Bruno Rzetelny; Alain Lebreton	Retired
DNF	IRC 2 Two Handed	GBR7933R	Fastrak XII	(United Kingdom) Great Britain	Andrieu Jeanneau Sunfast 3300	9.99	Nigel Colley; Matt Smith	Retired
DNF	IRC 2 Two Handed	FRA53318	Yesss Elec Eau	France	Valer JPK 10.30	10.34	Bertrand Fourmond; Eric Tilly	Retired
DNF	IRC 2	FRA53200	Foggy Dew	France	Valer JPK 10.30	10.34	Noel Racine	Retired
DNF	IRC 2 Two Handed	AUS888	Min River	Australia	Valer JPK 10.30	10.34	Jiang Lin; Aymeric Belloir	Retired
DNF	IRC 2 Two Handed	FRA53308	Leeuwin	France	Valer JPK 10.30	10.34	Bertrand Semaille; Tristan Debry	Retired
DNF	IRC 2	FRA53355	Léonard	France	Johnstone J99	9.90	Christophe Prigent	Retired
DNF	IRC 2	GBR1519R	Rock Lobster III	(United Kingdom) Great Britain	Andrieu Jeanneau Sunfast 3300	9.99	Fergus Angel	Retired
DNF	IRC 2 Two Handed	GBR6502L	Wild Pligrim	(United Kingdom) Great Britain	Andrieu Jeanneau Sunfast 3300	9.99	Daniel Jones; Jonathan Tyrrell	Retired
DNF	IRC 2 Two Handed	IRL1716	Big Deal	(Republic of Ireland) Ireland	Botin Carkeek Grand Soleil 37 BC	11.30	Derek & Conor Dillon	Retired
DNF	IRC 3 Two Handed	GBR7581R	Azora	(United Kingdom) Great Britain	Jackett C&C 115	11.45	Stephen Thomas; Chris Morton	Retired
DNF	IRC 3 Two Handed	GBR979R	Malice	(United Kingdom) Great Britain	Humphries HOD 35	10.64	Mike Moxley	Retired
DNF	IRC 3	BEL222	Gente di Mare	Belgium	Botin Carkeek Grand Soleil 40	12.12	Roel Ysewyn	Retired
DNF	IRC 3	GBR6908R	White Knight 7	(United Kingdom) Great Britain	Johnstone J109	10.74	Oli Bowen	Retired
DNF	IRC 3 Two Handed	GBR8532R	Firestorm	Netherlands	Johnstone J109	10.74	Wim van Slooten; Jochem Nonhebel	Retired
DNF	IRC 3	FRA53147	Jin Motion	France	Johnstone J99	9.90	Francoise Guennal	Retired
DNF	IRC 3	GBR9109T	Red Arrow	(United Kingdom) Great Britain	Johnstone J109	10.74	Gillian Burgess	Retired
DNF	IRC 3 Two Handed	FRA53066	Fastlane 2	France	Humphreys Elan 350	10.60	Jérôme Apolda; Yann Sibé	Retired
DNF	IRC 3	GBR9760R	Jengu	(United Kingdom) Great Britain	Johnstone J109	10.74	Neil Cox	Retired
DNF	IRC 3	GBR1535R	White Cloud IX	(United Kingdom) Great Britain	Humphries HOD 35	10.64	Richard Hart; John Donnelly	Retired
DNF	IRC 3 Two Handed	FRA43510	Laudato 2	France	Valer JPK 10.10	10.04	Clémence & Régis Vian	Retired
DNF	IRC 3	GBR9487R	Jumunu	(United Kingdom) Great Britain	Johnstone J109	10.74	Lesley Brooman	Retired
DNF	IRC 3	FRA43912	Papillon 4	France	Valer JPK 10.10	10.04	Alain Peron	Retired
DNF	IRC 3	GBR1010X	Jet Pack	(United Kingdom) Great Britain	Valer JPK 10.10	10.04	Mark Brown	Retired
DNF	IRC 3	GBR8932R	Full Circle	(United Kingdom) Great Britain	Andrieu Jeanneau Sunfast 3200	9.78	Ian & Bryan Lloyd	Retired
DNF	IRC 3 Two Handed	GBR735R	Saltheart	(United Kingdom) Great Britain	Humphries HOD 35	10.64	Chris Williams; Chris Brook	Retired
DNF	IRC 3 Two Handed	NED4774	Waverider	Netherlands	Andrieu Jeanneau Sunfast 3200	9.78	Willem Schopman; Rogier Jacobsen	Retired
DNF	IRC 3	FRA43944	Vent des Sables	France	Andrieu Jeanneau Sunfast 3200	9.78	Emmanuel Benoit	Retired
DNF	IRC 3 Two Handed	FRA9803	Platypus	France	Andrieu Jeanneau Sunfast 3200	9.78	Philippe Benaben; Frederic Stoclet	Retired
DNF	IRC 3 Two Handed	FRA43657	Fleur du Sud	France	Valer JPK 10.10	10.04	Patrick Molitor; Cyril Rihet	Retired
DNF	IRC 3 Two Handed	FRA44737	Enedis	France	Andrieu Jeanneau Sunfast 3200	9.78	Jacques Rigalleau	Retired
DNF	IRC 3 Two Handed	FRA53107	Ishsha	France	Valer JPK 10.10	10.04	Eric Bastard; Alexandre Castelnau	Retired
DNF	IRC 3 Two Handed	FRA44058	Ad Hoc	France	Valer JPK 10.10	10.04	Jean-François Chériaux; Gwenael Jacques	Retired
DNF	IRC 3 Two Handed	FRA44379	Uship	France	Andrieu Jeanneau Sunfast 3200	9.78	Patrick Isoard; Bruno Salle de Chou	Retired
DNF	IRC 3	FRA38315	Maigab	France	Andrieu Jeanneau Sunfast 3200	9.78	Christian Jacquelin	Retired
DNF	IRC 3 Two Handed	FRA39201	Mirabelle	France	Andrieu Jeanneau Sunfast 3200	9.78	Bertrand Daniels; Denis Jacob	Retired
DNF	IRC 3 Two Handed	FRA38411	Faribole	France	Valer JPK 10.10	10.04	Eric Poyet; Louis-Philippe Delorme	Retired
DNF	IRC 3	NED118	Winsome	Netherlands	Sparkman & Stephens S&S 41	12.74	Harry J. Heijst	Retired
DNF	IRC 3	GER7847	Montana	Germany	Sparkman & Stephens Swan 48	14.61	Markus Bocks	Retired
DNF	IRC 3 Two Handed	FRA36736	Wahoo	France	Valer JPK 9.60	9.60	Philippe Coupeau; Laurent Maindron	Retired
DNF	IRC 3	FRA29340	Cavok 4	France	Valer JPK 9.60	9.60	Olivier Bahon	Retired
DNF	IRC 4	8377	Gaunlet	(United Kingdom) Great Britain	Thomas Sigma 38	11.55	Andy Canning; Tom Nield	Retired
DNF	IRC 4	GBR8285	Kindred Spirit	(United Kingdom) Great Britain	Thomas Sigma 38	11.55	John Crosbie	Retired
DNF	IRC 4 Two Handed	POL20308	Bindi	Poland	Judel Vrolijk Dehler 33 Classic	9.99	Wladyslaw Chmielewski; Krzysztof Ziolkowski	Retired
DNF	IRC 4	IRL1397	Desert Star Irish Offshore Sailing	(Republic of Ireland) Ireland	Fauroux Jeanneau Sunfast 37	10.95	Rónán O Siochru	Retired
DNF	IRC 4	GER2193	Truwen	Germany	Sparkman & Stephens Swan 38	11.66	Jens-Werner Hinrichs	Retired
DNF	IRC 4	GBR2183R	Sunstone	(United Kingdom) Great Britain	Sparkman & Stephens S&S 39 One Off	12.10	Will Taylor-Jones	Retired
DNF	IRC 4	BE	Sato	Belgium	Fauroux Jeanneau Sunrise 34	10.02	Rémi Genon	Retired
DNF	IRC 4 Two Handed	GBR73R	Scherzo of Cowes	(United Kingdom) Great Britain	Sparkman & Stephens Swan 36	10.91	Jonathan Carter; Robbie Southwell	Retired
DNF	IRC 4 Two Handed	1661C	Magic Moments	(United Kingdom) Great Britain	Thomas Sigma 33 OOD	9.87	Andy & Pelham Etherington	Retired
DNS	IRC Super Zero	GBR8728R	Notorious	(United Kingdom) Great Britain	Mills Mini Maxi 72	21.95	Peter Morton	Did Not Start
DNS	IRC 1	NED8254	Barcarolle 2	Netherlands	J&J Salona 42	12.73	Jaap Gelling; Coen Bouhuys	Did Not Start
DNS	IRC 2 Two Handed	NED1409	Il Corvo	Netherlands	Valer JPK 10.30	10.34	Roeland Franssens; Astrid de Vin	Did Not Start
DNS	IRC 3 Two Handed	FRA38967	Kia Ora	France	Valer JPK 10.10	10.04	Olivier Hays; Maxime Lemesle	Did Not Start
DNS	IRC 4	GBR8274	Machismo II	(United Kingdom) Great Britain	Thomas Sigma 38	11.55	Tim Levett	Did Not Start
DNS	IRC 4 Two Handed	NED7488	Brunorskip	Netherlands	Finot Conq Beneteau First 31	9.61	Martin-Jan & Freek Strebe	Did Not Start

Notes

^1 – The yacht was given a discretionary 5% penalty to be added onto their corrected time by the International Jury due to breaching IRC Rule 21.3.6 (Sheeting of Sails, Sail Definitions, Bowsprits, Spinnaker Poles and Whisker Poles) by the team using a jockey pole that hadn't been declared on their yacht's IRC Rating Certificate during the race.
