= Swan 55 =

Sailboat class

Swan 55 Sloop
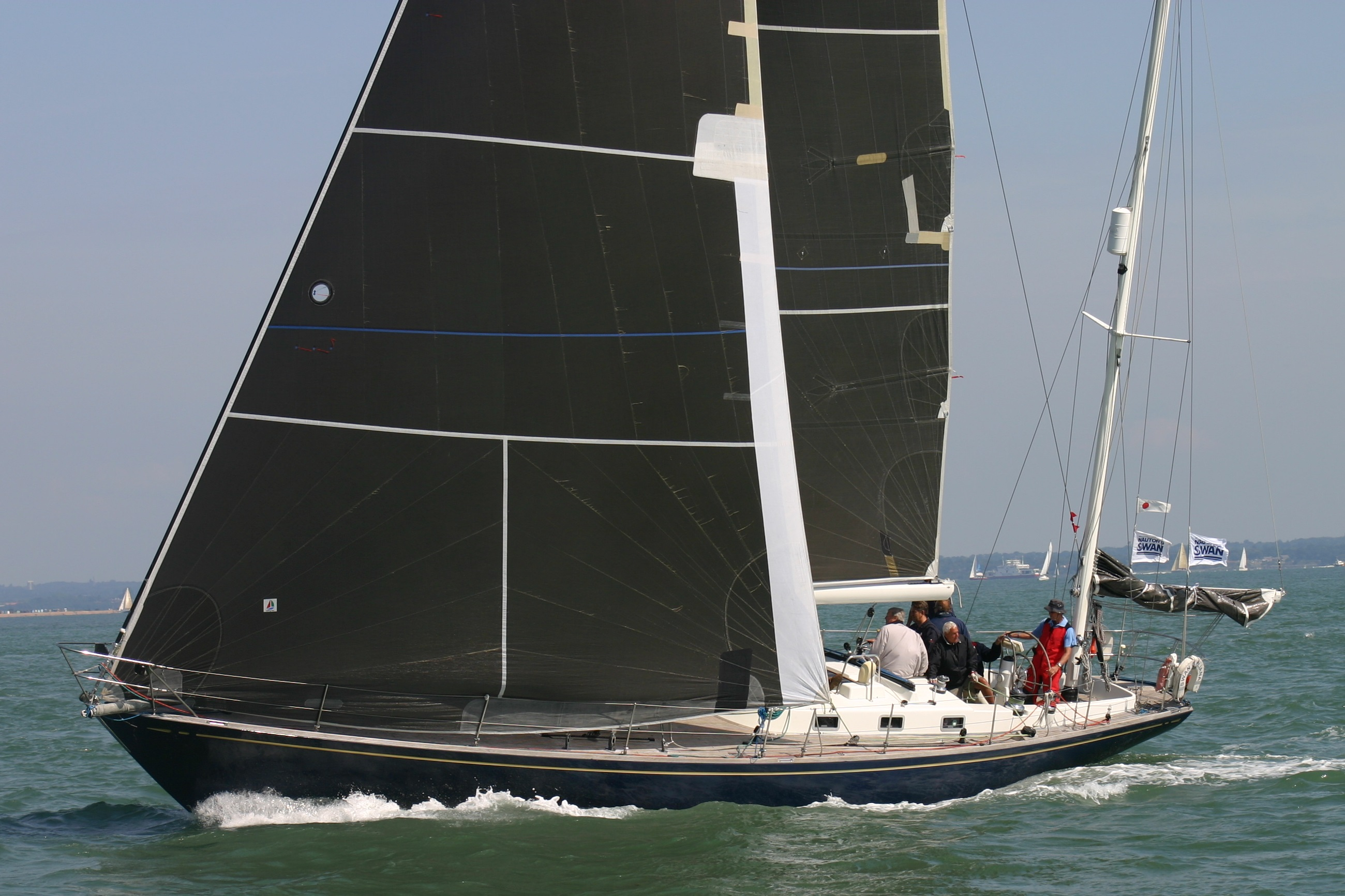

Development
- Designer: Sparkman & Stephens
- Location: Finland
- Year: 1970
- No. built: 16
- Builder: Oy Nautor AB
- Role: Cruiser-Racer
- Name: Swan 55 Sloop

Boat
- Displacement: 45,600 lb (20,684 kg)
- Draft: 8.00 ft (2.44 m)

Hull
- Type: monohull
- Construction: glassfibre
- LOA: 54.63 ft (16.65 m)
- LWL: 38.48 ft (11.73 m)
- Beam: 14.21 ft (4.33 m)
- Engine: Volvo Penta MD21A 61 hp (45 kW) diesel engine

Hull appendages
- Keel: fin keel
- Ballast: 17,000 lb (7,711 kg)
- Rudder: Skeg-mounted/Spade-type/Transom-mounted rudder

Rig
- Rig type: Bermuda rig
- I foretriangle height: 63.00 ft (19.20 m)
- J foretriangle base: 22.00 ft (6.71 m)
- P mainsail luff: 57.00 ft (17.37 m)
- E mainsail foot: 20.50 ft (6.25 m)

Sails
- Sailplan: Masthead sloop
- Mainsail area: 584.25 sq ft (54.279 m^{2})
- Jib/genoa area: 693.00 sq ft (64.382 m^{2})
- Spinnaker area: 2,495 sq ft (231.8 m^{2})
- Upwind sail area: 1,277.25 sq ft (118.660 m^{2})

Racing
- PHRF: 48-57

The Swan 55 is a Finnish sailboat that was designed by Sparkman & Stephens as a cruiser-racer and first built in 1970.

The boat was variously sold as the Swan 55, Swan 53 and the Palmer Johnson 53.

== Production ==
The design was built by Oy Nautor AB in Finland, from 1970 to 1974 with 16 boats built, but it is now out of production. Of those built, seven were the yawl rig version.

== Design ==
The Swan 55 is a recreational keelboat, built predominantly of glassfibre, with wood trim. It has a masthead sloop or yawl rig, a raked stem, a skeg-mounted rudder controlled by a wheel and a fixed swept fin keel. It displaces 45,600 lb (20,684 kg) and carries 17,000 lb (7,711 kg) of lead ballast.

The boat has a draft of 8.00 ft (2.44 m) with the standard keel.

The boat is fitted with a Swedish Volvo Penta MD21A diesel engine of 61 hp (45 kW) for docking and manoeuvring. The fuel tank holds 80 U.S. gallons (300 L; 67 imp gal) and the fresh water tank has a capacity of 125 U.S. gallons (470 L; 104 imp gal).

The design has sleeping accommodation for nine people, with a double "V"-berth in the bow cabin, L-shaped and U-shaped settees in the main salon, a two straight settees and a pilot berth in the forward salon and two aft cabins each with a double berth. The galley is located on the port side just forward of the companionway ladder. The galley is L-shaped and is equipped with a three-burner stove, an ice box and a double sink. A navigation station is opposite the galley, on the starboard side. There are two heads, one just aft of the bow cabin on the port side and one on the starboard side, aft.

The design has a hull speed of 8.31 kn (15.39 km/h) and a PHRF handicap of 48 to 57.

== Variants ==
Sloop
This sloop-rigged model has a raised counter, reverse transom, a length overall of 54.63 ft (16.7 m) and a waterline length of 38.48 ft (11.7 m). For sailing downwind this model may be equipped with a symmetrical spinnaker of 2,495 sq ft (231.8 m^{2}).
Yawl
This yawl-rigged model has a lengthened, raised counter, angled transom, a length overall of 55.25 ft (16.8 m) and a waterline length of 38.48 ft (11.7 m). For sailing downwind this model may be equipped with a symmetrical spinnaker of 2,271 sq ft (211.0 m^{2}).

== See also ==
- List of sailing boat types
