= 2022 Route du Rhum =

Sailboat race

Event title
- Name: 2022 Route du Rhum
- Edition: 12th Edition
- Sponsor: Destination Guadeloupe
- Host: OC Sport Pen Duick

Event details
- Start location: St Malo (FRA)
- Finish location: Guadeloupe
- Course: Solo Non-Stop Transatlantic Race
- Dates: Starts 9th November 2022
- Yachts: 138 Boats

Competitors
- Competitors: 138 Sailors
- Competing nations: AUS (1), CHN (1), CRO (1), FRA (117), GBR (4), GER (2), HUN (1), ITA (2), JPN (1), NZL (1), RSA(1) SUI (4), USA (2)

Results
- Line honours: Edmond de Rothschild

Classes
- Class 1: Ultime
- Class 2: Multi 50
- Class 3: IMOCA 60
- Class 4: Class40
- Class 5: Rhum Multihull
- Class 6: Rhum Monohull

The Route du Rhum is a single person transatlantic race the 2022 race was the 12th edition and had six classes with 138 boats taking part. The events status as a qualification for event for the Vendee Globe lead to the largest most competitive fleet of IMOCA 60 class yachts gathered todate. In his first attempt at the race Charles Caudrelier took line honours in a new race record time on the Maxi Multihull Edmond de Rothschild in six days, 19 hours and 47 minutes.

== Incident ==
Delayed Start

Loss of IMOCA 60

Collisions with shipping and fellow Competitors

Running aground

Diversions

Capsize of Multi 50

== Results ==
=== Ultime ===
Pos	Sail No.	Boat name	Design	Year	Name / Nationality	Finish Time	Elapsed Time	Delta %	Speed (Rhum / Water)	Distance	Ref.
1		Edmond de Rothschild	Foiling Trimaran	2017	Charles Caudrelier (FRA)	2022-11-16 - 09:02:25	06d 19h 47m 25s	0%	21.63 / 26.86	4399.58	
2		SVR Lazartigue	Foiling Trimaran	2021	François Gabart (FRA)	2022-11-16 - 12:18:15	06d 23h 03m 15s	1.99%	21.2 / 26.13	4365	
3		Sodebo Ultim 3		2019	Thomas Coville (FRA)	2022-11-16 - 19:52:25	07d 06h 37m 25s	6.61%	20.28 / 25.42	4439	
4		Idec sport		2006	Francis Joyon (FRA)	2022-11-18 - 02:56:40	08d 13h 41m 40s	25.58%	17.22 / 22.3	4588	
5		Actual		2015	Yves Blevec (FRA)	2022-11-18 - 05:04:01	08d 15h 49m 01s	26.88%	17.04 / 21.91	4553	
6		MIEUX		2014	Arthur Le Vaillant (FRA)	2022-11-19 - 14:41:51	10d 01h 26m 51s	47.41%	14.67 / 19.23	4644.21	
7		Banque Populaire XI		2021	Armel Le Cléac'h (FRA)	2022-11-20 - 12:04:24	10d 22h 49m 24s	60.46%	13.48 / 19.84	5215.3	
8		Use It Again! by Extia		2004	Romain Pilliard (FRA)	2022-11-25 - 12:41:28	15d 23h 26m 28s	134.10%	9.24 / 12.33	4727.25	

=== Multi 50 ===
Pos	Sail No.	Boat name	Design	Year	Name / Nationality	Finish Time	Elapsed Time	Delta %	Speed (Rhum / Water)	Distance	Ref.
1	FRA 21	KOESIO		2020	Erwan Le Roux (FRA)	2022-11-20 - 10:50:52	10d 21h 35m 52s	0%	13.54 / 16.04	4197.23	
2	FRA 33	ARKEMA		2020	Quentin Vlamynck (FRA)	2022-11-20 - 11:09:05	10d 21h 54m 05s	0.12%	13.52 / 15.99	4186.67	
3	FRA 44	Primonial	Verdier	2009	Sebastien Rogues (FRA)	2022-11-20 - 16:52:37	11d 03h 37m 37s	2.3%	13.23 / 15.77	4220.75	
4		KOMILFO	Benoît Cabaret / Nigel Irens	2009	Eric Peron (FRA)	2022-11-21 - 08:36:30	11d 19h 21m 30s	8.32%	12.5 / 16.43	4656.52	
5	FRA 9	Les P'tits Doudous	Lalou Roucayrol / Romaric Neyhousser	2013	Armel Tripon (FRA)	2022-11-21 - 14:53:18	12d 01h 38m 18s	10.72%	12.23 / 15.05	4358.78	
6		Groupe GCA-1001 Sourires	VPLP design	2009	Gilles Lamire (FRA)	2022-11-21 - 22:37:23	13d 09h 22m 23s	22.85%	11.02 / 13.67	4394	
ABD	120000	Solidaires En Peloton - ARSEP	VPLP design	2017	Thibaut Vauchel-Camus (FRA)	Capsized 240 miles north of the Azores					
ABD		LEYTON	VPLP design	2017	Sam Goodchild (GBR)	Day 1 - Skipper injured in start sequence					

=== IMOCA 60 ===
Pos	Sail No.	Boat name	Year	Name / Nationality	Finish Time	Elapsed Time	Delta %	Speed (Rhum / Water)	Distance	Ref.
1	FRA 59	LinkedOut	2019	Thomas Ruyant (FRA)	2022-11-21 - 06:51:25	11d 17h 36m 25s	0%	12.58 / 15.49	4362.46	
2	FRA 79	Apivia (1)	2019	Charlie Dalin (FRA)	2022-11-21 - 08:53:11	11d 19h 38m 11s	0.72%	12.49 / 15.35	4353.88	
3	FRA 3	Charal (2)	2022	Jérémie Beyou (FRA)	2022-11-21 - 10:15:55	11d 21h 00m 55s	1.21%	12.43 / 15.19	4330.57	
4	FRA 85	Holcim - PRB	2022	Kevin Escoffier (FRA)	2022-11-21 - 12:46:14	11d 23h 31m 14s	2.1%	12.32 / 14.92	4290	
5	FRA 53	V&B Monbana Mayenne	2022	Maxime Sorel (FRA)	2022-11-21 - 22:42:42	12d 08h 59m 42s	5.46%	11.93 / 14.15	4203.12	
6	FRA 2030	Biotherm	2022	Paul Meilhat (FRA)	2022-11-21 - 23:33:33	12d 10h 18m 33s	5.93%	11.87 / 14.31	4267.46	
7	FRA 08	Teamwork.net	2018	Justine Mettraux (SUI)	2022-11-22 - 02:41:35	12d 13h 26m 35s	7.04%	11.75 / 13.71	4131.52	
8	FRA 09	Guyot environnement - Water Family	2015	Benjamin Dutreux (FRA)	2022-11-22 - 13:06:24	12d 23h 51m 24s	10.74%	11.36 / 13.56	4228.58	
9	FRA 27	MACSF	2007	Isabelle Joschke (FRA)	2022-11-22 - 15:41:54	13d 02h 26m 54s	11.66%	11.26 / 12.53	3940.78	
10	FRA 10	Fortinet - Best Western	2015	Romain Attanasio (FRA)	2022-11-22 - 20:55:20	13d 07h 40m 20s	13.52%	11.08 / 12.64	4041	
11	FRA 83	Mon Courtier Energie - Cap Agir Ensemble	2006	Sébastien Marsset (FRA)	2022-11-22 - 21:51:55	13d 08h 36m 55s	13.85%	11.05 / 12.33	3954	
12	GBR 77	Medallia (2)	2015	Pip Hare (GBR)	2022-11-22 - 21:53:12	13d 08h 38m 12s	13.86%	11.05 / 12.86	4122	
13	FRA 1000	LAZARE	2008	Tanguy Turquais (FRA)	2022-11-22 - 23:58:44	13d 10h 43m 44s	14.6%	10.98 / 12.25	3952	
14	GBR	Gentoo Sailing Team	2007	James Harayda (GBR)	2022-11-23 - 01:38:35	13d 12h 13m 35s	15.13%	10.92 / 12.83	4158.8	
15	FRA 30	Monnoyeur - Duo for a job	2011	Benjamin Ferre (FRA)	2022-11-23 - 04:53:30	13d 15h 39m 30s	16.35%	10.81 / 12.34	4044.88	
16	ITA 34	PRYSMIAN GROUP	2015	Giancarlo Pedote (FRA)	2022-11-23 - 05:47:50	13d 16h 32m 50s	16.67%	10.78 / 12.95	4255.02	
17	FRA 14	La Mie Caline (2)	2010	Arnaud Boissières (FRA)	2022-11-23 - 08:52:20	13d 19h 37m 20s	17.76%	10.68 / 12.23	4055.18	"
18	NZL 64	Imagine	2007	Conrad Colman (NZL)	2022-11-23 - 09:38:08	13d 20h 23m 08s	18.03%	10.66 / 12.35	4104.54	
19	FRA 17	Maitre CoQ V	2022	Yannick Bestaven (FRA)	2022-11-23 - 09:52:27	13d 20h 37m 27s	18.12%	10.65 / 12.99	4321.11	
20	FRA 6	Corum l'Epargne	2020	Nicolas Troussel (FRA)	2022-11-23 - 10:12:02	13d 20h 57m 02s	18.23%	10.64 / 12.92	4301.21	
21	SUI 7	Hublot	2019	Alan Roura (SUI)	2022-11-23 - 15:02:13	14d 01h 47m 13s	19.95%	10.49 / 12.38	4182.64	
22	FRA 1461	HUMAN Immobilier - Ebac	2006	Antoine Cornic (FRA)	2022-11-23 - 20:49:25	14d 07h 34m 25s	22%	10.31 / 11.86	4073.53	
23	FRA 01	COMME UN SEUL HOMME Powered by Altavia	2007	Éric Bellion (FRA)	2022-11-24 - 02:31:40	14d 13h 26m 40s	24.09%	10.14 / 11.86	4144.78	
24	MON 1297	Malizia-Seaexplorer	2022	Boris Herrmann (GER)	2022-11-24 - 04:36:41	14d 15h 21m 41s	24.77%	10.08 / 12.15	4267.69	
25	FRA 22	FREELANCE.COM	2007	Guirec Soudee (FRA)	2022-11-24 - 08:21:48	14d 18h 28m 48s	25.88%	9.99 / 11.85	4199.4	
26	HUN 23	SZABI RACING	2007	Weores Szabolcs (HUN)	2022-11-24 - 11:34:14	14d 22h 19m 44s	27.24%	9.88 / 11.15	3995.88	
27	FRA 172	Fives - Lantana Environnement	2006	Louis Duc (FRA)	2022-11-24 - 18:24:07	15d 05h 54m 07s	29.93%	9.68 / 11.06	4047.13	
28	FRA 109	Initiatives - Coeur (4)	2022	Sam Davies (GBR)	2022-11-25 - 19:50:17	16d 06h 35m 17s	38.7%	9.07 / 10.86	4242.71	
29	CHN 999	China Dream - HAIKOU	2007	Xu Jingkun (CHN)	2022-11-25 - 21:49:00	16d 08h 34m 00s	39.4%	9.02 / 11.13	4369.73	
30	FRA 71	Groupe SETIN	2007	Manuel Cousin (FRA)	2022-11-26 - 02:23:05	16d 13h 08m 05s	41.02%	8.92 / 11.25	4466.94	
31	FRA 20	Kattan	2004	François Guiffant (FRA)	2022-11-26 - 08:32:40	16d 19h 06m 40s	43.15%	8.79 / 11.08	4466.94	
32	SUI 49	Ollie Heer Ocean Racing	2007	Olive Heer (SUI)	2022-11-30 - 01:37:55	17d 00h 22m 55s	45.02%	8.67 / 11.81	4821.32	
33	FRA 14	Reve de Large - Region Guadeloupe	2007	Rodolphe Sepho (FRA)	2022-11-28 - 04:17:17	18d 15h 02m 17s	58.75%	7.92 / 10.49	4689.25	
34	FRA 50	Demain c’est loin	2006	Nicolas Rouger (FRA)	2022-11-28 - 21:32:42	19d 08h 17m 42s	64.87%	7.63 / 10.29	4777.08	
DNF	JPN 11	DMG Mori Global One	2019	Kojiro Shiraishi (JPN)	Collision with Oliver Heer Racing (Retired unaided to Port)					
DNF	FRA 02	Bureau Vallee 3	2020	Louis Burton (FRA)	Dismasted (Retired unaided to Port under jury rig)					
DNF	17	Groupe Apicil (2)	2015	Damien Seguin (FRA)	Collision with Ship Boat Dismasted (Retired unaided to Port)					
DNF	FRA 56	Newrest - Art & Fenêtres	2015	Fabrice Amedeo (FRA)	Electrical fire leading to the boat lost (Rescue by Container Ship from Liferaft)					

=== Class 40 ===
Pos	Sail No.	Boat name	Design	Year	Name / Nationality	Finish Time	Elapsed Time	Delta %	Speed (Rhum / Water)	Distance	Ref.
1	FRA 182	Paprec - Arkea	Lift V2	2022	Yoann Richomme (FRA)	2022-11-23 - 16:23:40	14d 03h 08m 40s	0%	10.44 / 11.81	4005.34	
2	ITA 181	Allagrande Pirelli	Musa 40	2022	Ambrogio Beccaria (ITA)	2022-11-23 - 20:38:48	14d 07h 23m 48s	1.25%	10.31 / 11.77	4041.06	
3	FRA 176	QUEGUINER - INNOVEO	Lift V2	2021	Corentin Douguet (FRA)	2022-11-23 - 22:39:12	14d 09h 24m 12s	1.85%	10.25 / 11.67	4031.19	
4	SUI 159	Banque Du Leman	Mach 40.4	2019	Simon Koster (SUI)	2022-11-24 - 08:00:00	14d 18h 45m 00s	4.6%	9.98 / 11.32	4015.19	
5	FRA 161	Redman	Raison	2020	Antoine Carpentier (FRA)	2022-11-24 - 11:25:45	14d 22h 10m 45s	5.61%	9.89 / 11.1	3976.35	
6	FRA 178	Groupe SNEF	Pogo S4	2022	Xavier Macaire (FRA)	2022-11-24 - 11:33:20	14d 22h 18m 20s	5.65%	9.89 / 11.32	4056.26	
7	FRA 185	Lamotte - Module Creation	Mach 40.5	2022	Luke Berry (FRA)	2022-11-24 - 12:15:22	14d 23h 00m 22s	5.86%	9.87 / 11.17	4009.25	
8	FRA 186	IBSA GROUP	Mach 40.5	2022	Alberto Bona (ITA)	2022-11-24 - 19:34:50	15d 06h 19m 50s	8.02%	9.67 / 10.93	4005.51	
9	FRA 180	Fondation Stargardt	Clak 40	2022	Martin Le Pape (FRA)	2022-11-25 - 17:45:04	16d 04h 30m 04s	14.55%	9.12 / 10.58	4111.95	
10	FRA 162	Project Rescue Ocean	Max 40	2020	Axel Trehin (FRA)	2022-11-25 - 22:16:16	16d 09h 01m 16s	15.89%	9.01 / 10.92	4291.41	
11	FRA 142	HBF-REFOREST ACTION	Tiz'h 40	2014	Kito de Pavant (FRA)	2022-11-26 - 01:15:45	16d 12h 00m 45s	16.77%	8.94 / 10.11	4002.81	
12	FRA 165	Edenred	Mach 40.4	2021	Emmanuel Le Roch (FRA)	2022-11-26 - 02:35:25	16d 13h 20m 25s	17.16%	8.91 / 10.43	4144.01	
13	FRA 158	Credit Mutuel	Raison	2019	Ian Lipinski (FRA)	2022-11-26 - 03:25:46	16d 14h 08m 46s	17.4%	8.9 / 10.6	4222.3	
14	USA 154	Polka Dot	Lombard	2018	Alexander Mehran (USA)	2022-11-26 - 04:11:15	16d 14h 56m 15s	17.63%	8.88 / 10.34	4124.63	
15	FRA 167	HappyVore - Cafe Joyeux	Clak 40	2021	Nicolas D'Estais (FRA)	2022-11-26 - 10:22:10	16d 21h 07m 10s	19.45%	8.74 / 9.88	4003.48	
16	FRA 184	Dekuple	Clak 40	2022	William Mathelin Moreaux (FRA)	2022-11-26 - 12:38:08	16d 23h 23m 08s	20.12%	8.69 / 9.9	4034.51	
17	FRA 153	Nestenn - Entrepreneurs Pour La Planete	Mach 40.3	2018	Jules Bonnier (FRA)	2022-11-26 - 14:10:50	17d 00h 55m 50s	20.58%	8.66 / 9.98	4081.83	
18	FRA 152	Rennes - Saint-Malo / Parentheses de Vies.	Tiz'h 40	2018	Baptiste Hulin (FRA)	2022-11-26 - 19:07:19	17d 05h 52m 19s	22.03%	8.56 / 9.78	4047.67	
19	FRA 172	Sogestran - Seafrigo	Pogo S4	2021	Cedric Chateau (FRA)	2022-11-26 - 19:49:50	17d 06h 34m 50s	22.24%	8.54 / 11.03	4572.13	
20	FRA 187	CURIUM life forward	Lift V2	2022	Marc Lepesqueux (FRA)	2022-11-26 - 20:58:23	17d 07h 43m 23s	22.58%	8.52 / 10.2	4242.09	
21	ITA 171	Influence	Clak 40	2021	Andrea Fornaro (ITA)	2022-11-26 - 23:45:46	17d 10h 30m 46s	23.4%	8.46 / 9.65	4039.7	
22	FRA 123	Chocolats Paries - Screb	Botin	2013	Jean-Baptiste Daramy (FRA)	2022-11-27 - 07:16:30	17d 18h 01m 30s	25.62%	8.31 / 9.71	4137.28	
23	FRA 134	Vicitan	Mach 40	2014	Didier Le Vourch (FRA)	2022-11-27 - 20:16:35	18d 07h 01m 35s	29.45%	8.07 / 9.68	4249.73	
24	FRA 88	Recycleurs Bretons - Navaleo	Tyker 40 Evolution 2	2010	Kieran Le Borgne (FRA)	2022-11-27 - 20:58:50	18d 07h 43m 50s	29.66%	8.05 / 9.21	4050.07	
25	FRA 177	Everial	Pogo S4	2022	Stan Thuret (FRA)	2022-11-28 - 07:03:03	18d 17h 48m 03s	32.63%	7.87 / 9.81	4412.89	
26	FRA 145	LEGALLAIS	Mach 40.3	2015	Pierre Casenave-Pere (FRA)	2022-11-28 - 07:49:04	18d 18h 34m 04s	32.85%	7.86 / 10.87	4897.02	
27	FRA 135	Vogue Avec Un Crohn	Pogo 40S3	2014	Pierre-Louis Attwell (FRA)	2022-11-28 - 18:25:36	19d 05h 10m 36s	35.98%	7.68 / 9.56	4406.66	
28	FRA 89	Prendre la mer, Agir pour la Foret	Akilaria	2010	Mathieu Claveau (FRA)	2022-11-28 - 19:54:05	19d 06h 39m 05s	36.42%	7.66 / 9.05	4185.08	
29	USA 144	Kite	Mach 40.3	2015	Greg Leonard (USA)	2022-11-28 - 20:56:50	19d 07h 41m 50s	36.73%	7.64 / 9.34	4332.21	
30	FRA 109	Caisses Reunionnaises Complementaires	Pogo 40S2	2011	Victor Jost (FRA)	2022-11-28 - 21:55:40	19d 08h 40m 40s	37.01%	7.62 / 9.28	4314.28	
31	FRA 30	Medecins du Monde	CMI / Rogers	2007	Morgane Ursault Poupon (FRA)	2022-11-29 - 00:11:54	19d 10h 56m 54s	37.68%	7.59 / 9.08	4240.19	
32	FRA 65	YODA	Akilaria Mk2 (Proto)	2008	Franz Bouvet (FRA)	2022-11-29 - 13:48:50	20d 00h 33m 50s	41.7%	7.37 / 9.07	4356.8	
33	FRA 104	Dopamine Sailing Team	Manuard	2011	Florian Guegen (FRA)	2022-11-29 - 22:57:50	20d 09h 42m 50s	44.4%	7.23 / 8.92	4366.95	
34	FRA 98	Wisper	Tyker 40 Evolution 2	2010	Maxime Cauwe (FRA)	2022-11-30 - 08:17:50	20d 19h 02m 50s	47.15%	7.1 / 9.06	4523.36	
35	FRA 124	Naviguons contre le diabete	Akilaria RC 3	2012	Anatole Facon (FRA)	2022-11-30 - 13:19:34	21d 00h 04m 34s	48.63%	7.03 / 8.89	4482.9	
36	FRA 149	Bleu Blanc	Owen Clarke	2017	Herve Thomas (FRA)	2022-12-02 - 21:01:01	23d 07h 46m 01s	65.05%	6.33 / 7.7	4308.17	
37	FRA 174	Captain Alternance	Lift V2	2021	Keni Piperol-Dampied (FRA)	2022-12-05 - 15:18:30	26d 02h 03m 30s	84.6%	5.66 / 8.46	5295.85	
RET	RSA 151	Conscious Planet	Mach 40.3	2017	Donald Alexander (RSA)	21 Nov - Battery Charging Issues					
RET	FRA 183	Centrakor	Lift V2	2022	Mikael Mergui (FRA)	18 Nov - Problems with Batteries ()					
RET	FRA 100	Bateau Cit'Hotel-Région Guadeloupe	Pogo 40S2	2010	Sacha Daunar (FRA)	17 Nov - maladie ()					
RET	FRA 168	Edigo - Univerre	Cape Racing scow 40	2021	Yves Courbon (FRA)	16 Nov - Technical Problems					
RET	CRO 130	ACI	Mach 40	2013	Ivica Kostelić (CRO)	15 Nov -					
RET	FRA 173	Viranga	Pogo S4	2021	Emmanuel Hamez (FRA)	15 Nov - Torn Mainsail					
RET	FRA 163	SERENIS Consulting	Pogo S4	2021	Jean Galfione (FRA)	14 Nov -					
RET	FRA 115	À l'aveugle-Trim Control	Mach 40	2012	François Jambou (FRA)	14 Nov - Dismasted ()					
RET	FRA 175	Inter Invest	Max 40	2022	Matthieu Perraut (FRA)	14 Nov - Collision leading to hull structural issues ()					
RET	FRA 148	FullSave	Tiz'h 40	2016	Jean-Pierre Balmès (FRA)	14 Nov - Problems with ballast system and halyard locks					
RET	AUS 169	Eora	Lift v2	2021	Rupert Henry (AUS)	13 Nov - Structural failure of a forward bulkhead of the vessel ()					
RET	FRA 170	La Boulangère Bio	Max 40	2021	Amélie Grassi (FRA)	12 Nov - Dismasted ()					
RET	FRA 166	Crosscall	Lift v2	2021	Aurélien Ducroz (FRA)	12 Nov - Dismasted ()					
RET	GER 164	Volvo	Max 40	2021	Jonas Gerckens (GER)	11 Nov - Sail Damage and Autopilot Failure					
RET	FRA 97	Fortissimo	Akilaria	2010	Geoffrey Mataczynski (FRA)	11 Nov - Problem with the Autopilot ()					
RET	FRA 179	Glaces Romane	Cape Racing scow 40	2022	Laurent Camprubi (FRA)	11 Nov - Retired Unaided to Le Harve with multiple issue					
RET	FRA 155	Randstad-Ausy	Mach 40.3	2018	Martin Louchart (FRA)	11 Nov - plusieurs dommages après collision avec rochers ()					
RET	FRA 160	E.Leclerc Ville-La-Grand	Mach 40.4	2020	Antoine Magre (FRA)	10 Nov - Rescue after running aground onto the Island of Batz ()					

=== Rhum Monohull ===
Pos	Sail No.	Boat name	Design	Year	Name / Nationality	Finish Time	Elapsed Time	Delta %	Speed (Rhum / Water)	Distance	Ref.
1		Notre Mediterranee - Ville De Nice	Verdier - JP54	2010	Jean-Pierre Dick (FRA)	2022-11-26 - 03:12:51	16d 13h 57m 51s	0%	8.9 / 10.43	4151.01	
2		Formatives Esi - Ocean As Common	IMOCA 60 Helvim	1991	Catherine Chabaud (FRA)	2022-11-28 - 23:33:43	19d 10h 18m 43s	17.17%	7.6 / 9.16	4272.49	
3		CAP AU CAP LOCATION		1980	Wilfrid Clerton (FRA)	2022-11-29 - 11:26:45	19d 22h 11m 45s	20.16%	7.41 / 9.06	4330.58	
4		Tradisyon Gwadloup		2002	Willy Bissainte (FRA)	2022-11-30 - 10:14:10	20d 20h 59m 10s	25.89%	7.07 / 8.95	4482.73	
5		Kornog 2		2011	Gilles Colubi (FRA)	2022-12-03 - 09:38:45	23d 20h 23m 45s	43.83%	6.19 / 7.91	4530.31	
6		Elora		2021	Olivier Nemsguern (FRA)	2022-12-04 - 17:41:38	25d 04h 26m 28s	51.88%	5.86 / 7.31	4419.49	
OTE		Terranimo		1999	Guy Pronier (FRA)						
OTE		Faiaoahe		1999	Remy Gerin (FRA)						
OTE		Bella Donna - Race For Pure Ocean		2006	Fabio Gennari (FRA)						
OTE		PEN DUICK III POUR LES ENFANTS DE ROBERT DEBRE		1967	Arnaud Pennarun (FRA)						
OTE		JSB Demenagements		1994	Jean-Sebastien Biard (FRA)						
RET		Sos parebrise plus		1998	Daniel Ecalard (FRA)						

=== Rhum Multihull ===
Pos	Sail No.	Boat name	Design	Year	Name / Nationality	Finish Time	Elapsed Time	Delta %	Speed (Rhum / Water)	Distance	Ref.
1	FRA 82	Lodigroup	50 ft Cat - Christophe Barreau	2022	Loic Escoffier (FRA)	2022-11-25 - 19:52:23	16d 06h 37m 23s	0%	9.07 / 0	0	
2	FRA 0	We Explore	60 ft Cat - Outremer 5X	2022	Roland Jourdain (FRA)	2022-11-25 - 20:36:00	16d 07h 21m 00s	0.19%	9.05 / 10.64	4163.28	
3		Metarom MG5	52 ft Cat - MG5 Barreau/Neuman	2021	Marc Guillemot (FRA)	2022-11-26 - 07:06:06	16d 17h 51m 06s	2.87%	8.81 / 10.7	4301.25	
4		GDD		2021	Halvard Mabire (FRA)	2022-11-26 - 09:15:26	16d 20h 00m 26s	3.43%	8.77 / 9.91	4002.42	
5		Guyader - Saveol		2020	Gwen Chapalain (FRA)	2022-11-27 - 02:34:15	17d 13h 19m 15s	7.86%	8.41 / 10.24	4313.36	
6		Ille Et Vilaine Cap Vers l'Inclusion		1987	Fabrice Payen (FRA)	2022-11-28 - 05:41:59	18d 16h 26m 59s	14.8%	7.9 / 9.84	4412.89	
7		FLO	ORMA 60 Trimaran - VPLP Jeanneau	1989	Philippe Poupon (FRA)	2022-11-28 - 08:18:37	18d 19h 03m 37s	15.47%	7.85 / 10.92	4924.59	
8		Pir2		1983	Etienne Hochede (FRA)	2022-11-28 - 18:18:54	20d 05h 03m 54s	24.18%	7.3 / 8.79	4261.46	
9		Acapella - la Chaine de l'Espoir		1981	Charlie Capelle (FRA)	2022-11-30 - 21:11:24	21d 07h 56m 24s	31.06%	6.92 / 8.47	4336.94	
10		Chateau Du Launay		1982	Christophe Bogrand (FRA)	2022-11-30 - 22:05:35	21d 08h 50m 35s	31.29%	6.91 / 8.74	4480.72	
11		Moxie Bati-Armor	51 ft - Tri	1979	Thomas Lurton (FRA)	2022-12-01 - 09:24:20	21d 20h 09m 20s	34.18%	6.76 / 8.15	4269.41	
12		Happy		1980	Laurent Etheimer (FRA)	2022-12-02 - 07:50:00	22d 18h 25m 00s	39.88%	6.48 / 8.04	4393.47	
RET		Trilogik - Dys De Cœur	50 ft - Tri	2003	David Ducosson (FRA)	2 Dec. - Autopilot Failure					
RET		RAYON VERT		2011	Oren Nataf (FRA)	10 Nov. -					
RET		Jess	53 ft Tri - Irens	1990	Gilles Buekenhout (FRA)	23 Nov. -					
RET		CMA Ile-de-France 60 000 Rebonds	ORC 50 Cat	2019	Brieuc Maisonneuve (FRA)	13 Nov. - Capsized the boat was lost					
RET		Interaction		2002	Erwan Thiboumery (FRA)	15 Nov. -					
