= 2025 Transat Cafe-L'Or =

2025 2025 Transat Cafe-L'Or
Event title
- Edition: 17th
- Yachts: Ultime; Multi 50; IMOCA 60; Class 40

Classes
- Ultime: Tom Laperche (FRA); Frank Cammas (FRA)
- Multi 50: Thomas Rouxel (FRA); Baptiste Hulin (FRA)
- IMOCA 60: Jérémie Beyou (FRA); Morgan Lagravière (FRA)
- Class 40: Guillaume Pirouelle (FRA); Cédric Chateau (FRA)

The 2025 edition of the Transat Cafe-L'Or was the 17th edition of the yachting race and was raced from Le Havre, France, to Fort de France, Martinique.

Class	Course Distance	Revised Distance	Boats Starting
Ultime	6200	6200	
Multi 50	4600	4600	
IMOCA 60	4350	4350	
Class 40	6200	Leg 1 Leg 2 Total	

(1) Made up of two Leg Race with a stop in .

== Course changes ==
Due to a storm the Class 40 made an intermediate stop in La Coruña.

== Results ==
=== Ultime ===
Pos.	Boat			Crew		Time		Time Delta			Water		Ref.
Pos.	Sail No.	Boat name	Year	Name	Gender	Finish Time (UTC)	Elapsed Time	Delta	%	Speed Rhum	Distance	Speed Water	Ref.
1	FRA 1	SVR Lazartigue	2021	Tom Laperche (FRA); Frank Cammas (FRA)	M M	2025-11-06 - 03:13:58	10d 13h 03m 58s	N/A	0	24.5	6490	25.65	
2	FRA 73	Sodebo Ultim 3	2019	Thomas Coville (FRA); Benjamin Schwartz (FRA)	M M	2025-11-06 - 07:40:09	10d 17h 30m 09s	0d 04h 26m 11s	1.75	24.08	6591	25.6	
3	FRA 53	Actual Ultim 3	2015	Anthony Marchand (FRA); Julien Villion (FRA)	M M	2023-11-06 - 22:23:07	11d 08h 13m 07s	0d 19h 09m 09s	7.57	22.78	6575	24.15	
4	FRA 11	Maxi Banque Populaire XI	2021	Armel Le Cleac'H (FRA); Sébastien Josse (FRA)	M M	2025-11-07 - 04:52:00	11d 14h 42m 00s	1d 01h 38m 02s	10.13	22.25	6719	24.11	

=== Multi 50 ===
Pos.	Boat			Crew		Time		Time Delta			Water		Ref.
Pos.	Sail No.	Boat name	Year	Name	Gender	Finish Time (UTC)	Elapsed Time	Delta	%	Speed Rhum	Distance	Speed Water	Ref.
1		Viabilis Oceans	2017	Thomas Rouxel (FRA); Baptiste Hulin (FRA)	M M	2025-11-06 - 19:54:30	12d 05h 24m 30	N/A	0	15.68	5709	19.46	
2		Wewise	2019	Gaston Morvan (FRA); Pierre Quiroga (FRA)	M M	2025-11-06 - 20:12:02	12d 05h 42m 02s	17m 32s	0.1	15.66	5615	19.12	
3		Le Rire médecin - Lamotte	2009	Antoine Joubert (FRA); Luke Berry (FRA)	M M	2025-11-06 - 20:22:12	12d 05h 52m 12s	27m 42s	0.16	15.65	5605	19.07	
4		Solidaires en peloton	2020	Damien Seguin (FRA); Thibaut Vauchel-Camus (FRA)	M M	2025-11-06 - 20:38:53	12d 06h 08m 53s	44m 23s	0.25	15.64	5521	18.77	
5		Edenred 5	2025	Basile Bourgnon (FRA); Emmanuel Le Roch (FRA)	M M	2025-11-07 - 00:35:09	12d 10h 06m 09s	04h 41m 39s	1.6	15.43	5607	18.81	
6		Upwind by Merconcept	2013	Élodie-Jane Mettraux (SUI); Anne-Claire Le Berre (FRA)	F F	2025-11-07 - 13:51:18	12d 23h 21m 18s	0d 17h 56m 48s	6.12	14.77	5717	18.36	
7		Mon Bonnet rose	2009	Arnaud Vasseur (FRA); Laurent Bourgues (FRA)	M M	2025-11-07 - 18:15:21	13d 03h 45m 21s	0d 22h 20m 51s	7.62	14.57	5655	17.91	
DNF		Inter Invest	2023	Jean-Baptiste Gellée (FRA); Matthieu Perrault (FRA)	M M	Capsized on 26th crew airlifted							
DNF		Koesio	2023	Audrey Ogereau (FRA); Erwan Le Roux (FRA)	F M	Capsized on 26th crew airlifted							
DNF		Lazare x Hellio	2023	Tanguy Le Turquais (FRA); Erwan Le Draoulec (FRA)	M M	Capsized on 25th crew airlifted							

=== IMOCA 60 ===
Pos.	Boat			Crew		Time		Time Delta			Water		Ref.
Pos.	Sail No.	Boat name	Year	Name	Gender	Finish Time (UTC)	Elapsed Time	Delta	%	Speed Rhum	Distance	Speed Water	Ref.
1	FRA 3	Charal (2)	2022	Jérémie Beyou (FRA); Morgan Lagravière (FRA)	M M	2025-11-07 - 10:15:18	11d 19h 45m 18s	N/A	0	15.33	5467	19.27	
2	USA 1297	11th Hour Racing (3)	2022	Francesca Clapcich (ITA)/USA; Will Harris (GBR)	F M	2025-11-07 - 16:02:26	12d 01h 32m 46s	0d 05h 47m 28s	2.04	15.02	5503	19.01	
3	FRA 79	MACIF Santé Prévoyance	2023	Sam Goodchild (GBR); Loïs Berrehar (FRA)	M M	2025-11-07 - 17:55:47	12d 03h 25m 47s	0d 07h 40m 29s	2.7	14.93	5579	19.14	
4	FRA 59	ALLAGRANDE MAPEI	2023	Ambrogio Beccaria (ITA); Thomas Ruyant (FRA)	M M	2025-11-07 - 21:54:19	12d 07h 24m 19s	0d 11h 39m 01s	4.11	14.73	5650	19.13	
5	FRA 8	Team SNEF - TEAMWORK.NET	2018	Justine Mettraux (SUI); Xavier Macaire (FRA)	F M	2025-11-8 - 07:12:28	12d 16h 42m 28s	0d 20h 57m 10s	7.38	14.28	5350	17.56	
6	FRA 109	Initiative Coeur 4	2022	Samantha Davies (GBR); Violette Dorange (FRA)	F F	2025-11-8 - 11:41:12	12d 21h 11m 12s	1d 01h 25m 54s	8.96	14.07	5350	17.30	
7	FRA 02	BUREAU VALLÉE (2)	2020	Louis Burton (FRA); Clément Commagnac (FRA)	M M	2025-11-8 - 13:21:36	12d 22h 51m 36s	1d 03h 06m 18s	9.55	13.99	5346	17.20	
8	FRA 62	ASSOCIATION PETITS PRINCES - QUEGUINER	2025	Elodie Bonafous (FRA); Yann Elies (FRA)	F M	2025-11-8 - 21:37:02	13d 07h 07m 02s	1d 11h 21m 44s	12.46	13.63	5444	17.06	
9	FRA 09	4CAD - LA MIE CÂLINE (4)	2015	Arnaud Boissières (FRA); Benjamin Dutreux (FRA)	M M	2025-11-8 - 07:18:32	13d 16h 48m 32s	1d 21h 03m 14s	15.88	13.23	5557	16.90	
10	FRA 24	Paprec ARKEA (5)	2023	Yoann Richomme (FRA); Corentin Horeau (FRA)	M M	2025-11-10 - 04:00:19	14d 13h 30m 19s	2d 17h 45m 01s	23.17	12.45	5979	17.11	
11	FRA 10	FORTINET - BESTWESTERN (2)	2015	Romain Attanasio (FRA); Maxime Sorel (FRA)	M M	2025-11-10 - 13:00:57	14d 22h 30m 57s	3d 02h 45m 39s	26.35	12.13	5335	14.88	
12			2025	Armel Tripon (FRA); Tanguy Leglatin (FRA)	M M	2025-11-10 - 16:59:16	15d 02h 29m 16s	3d 06h 43m 58s	27.75	12.00	5707	15.74	
13	FRA30	CAFÉ JOYEUX	2011	Nicolas D'Estais (FRA); Simon Koster (SUI)	M M	2025-11-11 - 00:01:16	15d 09h 31m 16s	3d 13h 45m 58s	30.23	11.77	4929	13.34	
14	FRA 172	FIVES GROUP - LANTANA ENVIRONNEMENT	2006	Louis Duc (FRA); Masa Suzuki (JPN)	M M	2025-11-12 - 08:11:59	16d 18h 41m 59s	4d 22h 56m 41s	41.92	10.8			
15	FRA 123	COUP DE POUCE	2010	Manuel Cousin (FRA); Jean-Baptiste Daramy (FRA)	M M	2025-11-13 - 14:28:14	18d 00h 58m 14s	6d 05h 12m 56s	52.59	10.05			
16	FRA 56	FDJ UNITED - WEWISE	2007	Fabrice Amedeo (FRA); Andreas Baden (GER)	M M	2025-11-13 - 16:41:10	18d 03h 11m 10s	6d 07h 25m 52s	53.37	10			
17	NZ 64	MSIG Europe	2007	Conrad Colman (NZL); Mathieu Blanchard (FRA)	M M	2025-11-15 - 03:57:47	19d 14h 27m 47s	7d 18h 42m 29s	65.8	9.25			
18	HUN 23	NEW EUROPE	2007	Szabolcs Weöres (HUN); Bérénice Charrez (SUI)	M F	2025-11-15 - 17:53:06	20d 04h 23m 06s	8d 08h 37m 48s	70.71	8.98			

=== Class 40 ===
Pos.	Boat				Crew		Time				Ref.
Pos.	Sail No.	Boat name	Design	Year	Name	Gender	Leg 1	Leg 2	Elapsed	Delta	Ref.
1	FRA 197	SEAFRIGO-SOGESTRAN	Mach 40.5	2023	Guillaume Pirouelle (FRA); Cedric Chateau (FRA)	M M	2d 18h 37m 03s	16d 07h 57m 43s	19d 02h 34m 46s	N/A	
2	FRA 209	SNSM , faites un don !	Lift v3	2025	Corentin Douguet (FRA); Axel Trehin (FRA)	M M	2d 18h 15m 25s	16d 08h 26m 42s	19d 02h 42m 07s	0d 00h 07m 21s	
3	FRA 204	LES INVINCIBLES	Musa 40	2024	William Mathelin Moreaux (FRA); Pietro Luciani (ITA)	M M	2d 20h 01m 12s	16d 14h 55m 42s	19d 10h 56m 54s	0d 08h 22m 08s	
4	FRA 182	AMARRIS	Lift V2	2022	Achille Nebout (FRA); Gildas Mahe (FRA)	M M	2d 19h 03m 46s	17d 03h 48m 01s	19d 22h 51m 47s	0d 20h 17m 01s	
5	FRA 205	BLEU BLANC PLANETE LOCATION	Mach40.6	2024	Quentin Le Nabour (FRA); Thierry Chabagny (FRA)	M M	2d 20h 47m 00s	17d 02h 52m 00s	19d 23h 39m 00s	0d 21h 04m 14s	
6	FRA 199	LEGALLAIS	Lift V2	2023	Fabien Delahaye (FRA); Pierre Leboucher (FRA)	M M	2d 19h 38m 41s	17d 04h 02m 31s	19d 23h 41m 12s	0d 21h 06m 26s	
7	FRA 211	EKINOX	Musa 40	2025	Benoit Sineau (FRA); Aberto Riva (ITA)	M M	2d 20h 25m 09s	17d 04h 09m 59s	20d 00h 35m 08s	0d 22h 00m 22s	
8	FRA 176	INLAND ROOTS OCEAN SOUL	Lift V2	2021	Milan Kolacek (CZE); Pierre Brasseur (FRA)	M M	2d 20h 32m 44s	17d 04h 22m 44s	20d 00h 55m 28s	0d 22h 20m 42s	
9	FRA 196	ALTERNATIVE SAILING-LES; CONSTRUCTIONS DU BELON	Mach 40.5	2023	Guillaume L'Hostis (FRA); Antoine Le Manchec (FRA)	M M	2d 20h 04m 48s	17d 05h 12m 04s	20d 01h 16m 52s	0d 22h 42m 06s	
10	FRA 213	SOLANO	Musa 40	2025	Robin Follin (FRA); Jules Bonnier (FRA)	M M	2d 20h 30m 59s	17d 05h 07m 39s	20d 01h 38m 38s	0d 23h 03m 52s	
11	FRA 195	VOGUE AVEC UN CROHN	Mach 40.5	2023	Pierre Louis Attwell (FRA); Maxime Bensa (FRA)	M M	2d 22h 14m 36s	17d 03h 34m 17s	20d 01h 48m 53s	0d 23h 14m 07s	
12	FRA 183	CENTRAKOR HIRSCH	Lift V2	2022	Mikael Mergui (FRA); Keni Piperol (FRA)	M M	2d 21h 49m 49s	17d 04h 24m 40s	20d 02h 14m 29s	0d 23h 39m 43s	
13	FRA 190	NST RACING & CABINET Z	Lift V2		Thomas Jourdren (FRA); Joseph Cloarec (FRA)	M M	2d 22h 02m 56s	17d 14h 03m 39s	20d 12h 06m 35s	1d 09h 31m 49s	
14	FRA 208	ZEISS	Mach40.6	2024	Thimote Polet (FRA); Pierrick Letouze (FRA)	M M	2d 22h 51m 45s	17d 16h 56m 22s	20d 15h 48m 07s	1d 13h 13m 21s	
15	FRA 185	DEFI SOLIDAIRE AVEC ELLYE ET L'AECHE	Mach 40.5	2022	Nicolas Jossier (FRA); Sophie Faguet (FRA)	M F	3d 01h 52m 38s	17d 21h 09m 57s	20d 23h 02m 35s	1d 20h 27m 49s	
16	ITA 212	MACCAFERRI FUTURA	Musa 40	2025	Luca Rosetti (ITA); Matteo Sericano (ITA)	M M	3d 23h 51m 00s	17d 03h 45m 10s	21d 03h 36m 10s	2d 01h 01m 24s	
17	FRA 178	EMPOWHER	Pogo S4	2022	Pamela Lee (IRL); Jay Thompson (USA)	F M	3d 02h 18m 15s	18d 05h 44m 47s	21d 08h 03m 02s	2d 05h 28m 16s	
18	FRA 186	ALDERAN	Mach 40.5	2022	Sasha Laniece (FRA); Sanni Beucke (GER)	F F	3d 01h 48m 44s	18d 06h 46m 17s	21d 08h 35m 01s	2d 06h 00m 15s	
19	FRA 210	TRIMCONTROL	Agité 40	2025	Alexandre Le Gallais (FRA); Michel Desjoyeaux (FRA)	M M	2d 23h 10m 55s	18d 10h 16m 55s	21d 09h 27m 50s	2d 06h 53m 04s	
20	FRA 175	ENGIE-DESSINE-MOI LA HIGH-TECH	Max 40	2022	Aina Bauza Roig (ESP); Axelle Pillain (FRA)	F F	3d 05h 07m 23s	18d 05h 21m 22s	21d 10h 28m 45s	2d 07h 53m 59s	
21	ITA 193	INFLUENCE 2	Musa 40	2023	Andrea Fornaro (ITA); Alessandro Torresani (ITA)	M M	2d 23h 25m 35s	18d 12h 15m 13s	21d 11h 40m 48s	2d 09h 06m 02s	
22	FRA 142	PHARE 40-HA PLUS PME	Tiz'h 40	2014	Edgard Vincens (FRA); Louis Torreilles (FRA)	M M	3d 09h 55m 32s	18d 06h 54m 26s	21d 16h 49m 58s	2d 14h 15m 12s	
23	FRA 181	VSF SPORTS	Musa 40	2022	Pep Costa (ESP); Pablo Santurde Del Arco (ESP)	M M	2d 19h 35m 10s	19d 01h 48m 06s	21d 21h 23m 16s	2d 18h 48m 30s	
24	FRA 147	BELCO CEC	Mabire-Nivelt	2016	Louis Mayaud (FRA); Alexandre Bellange (FRA)	M M	3d 07h 19m 06s	19d 10h 29m 03s	22d 17h 48m 09s	3d 15h 13m 23s	
25	FRA 160	REAUTE CHOCOLAT	Mach 40.4	2020	Lomano Takasi (FRA); Jean Marre (FRA)	M M	3d 03h 20m 29s	19d 20h 33m 44s	22d 23h 54m 13s	3d 21h 19m 27s	
26	FRA 203	PIERREVAL-FONDATION GOOD PLANET	Pogo S4	2024	Vincent Riou (FRA); Yann Doffin (FRA)	M M	3d 01h 13m 14s	20d 10h 55m 04s	23d 12h 08m 18s	4d 09h 33m 32s	
27	FRA 154	WEEECYCLING	Lift 40	2018	Nicolas Lemarchand (FRA); Matthieu Derenne (FRA)	M M	3d 01h 47m 47s	20d 11h 46m 22s	23d 13h 34m 09s	4d 10h 59m 23s	
28	FRA 166	CROSSCALL	Lift v2	2021	Aurelien Ducroz (FRA); Jonathan Chodkiewiez (FRA)	M M	3d 01h 39m 06s	20d 19h 32m 27s	23d 21h 11m 33s	4d 18h 36m 47s	
29	FRA 173	VIRANGA	Pogo S4	2021	Emmanuel Hamez (FRA); Gerald Veniard (FRA)	M M	3d 08h 42m 51s	20d 18h 05m 48s	24d 02h 48m 39s	5d 00h 13m 53s	
30	FRA 88	RENOVATEC-VOILES ET PERFORMANCES	Tyker 40 Evolution 2	2010	Ulysse Pozzoli (FRA); Steven Griener (SUI)	M M	3d 13h 27m 37s	20d 21h 22m 46s	24d 10h 50m 23s	5d 08h 15m 37s	
31	FRA 158	AIRVANCE OCELIAN TERELIAN	Max 40	2019	Thea Khelif (FRA); Marion Engelhard (FRA)	F F	3d 11h 06m 59s	21d 00h 55m 52s	24d 12h 02m 51s	5d 09h 28m 05s	
32	FRA 157	L'AGENCE TELECOM-SOTRAPLANT	Cape 40	2019	Matthieu Foulquier Gazagnes (FRA); Gildas Beauchamps (FRA)	M M	3d 13h 28m 42s	21d 04h 49m 23s	24d 18h 18m 05s	5d 15h 43m 19s	
33	FRA 100	OSE TA VICTOIRE	Pogo 40S2	2010	Thomas Lurton (FRA); Sacha Vandenbrouck (BEL)	M M	4d 14h 19m 42s	21d 18h 22m 10s	26d 08h 41m 52s	7d 06h 07m 06s	
34	FRA 115	MARTINIQUE HORIZON	Mach 40	2012	Jean-Yves Aglae (FRA); Moane Mangattale (FRA)	M M	4d 08h 19m 42s	22d 05h 41m 10s	26d 14h 00m 52s	7d 11h 26m 06s	
ABD	FRA 164	INTERACTION	Max 40	2021	Yannig Livory (FRA); Erwan Livory (FRA)	M M	3d 10h 22m 58s	(RET)		(DPI)	
ABD	FRA 141	ESATCO	Pogo 40S3	2014	Nicolas Guibal (FRA); Gauthier Bril (FRA)	M M	3d 17h 49m 01s	(RET)			
ABD	FRA 177	OCEAN CONNECT-THE SEA CLEANERS	Pogo S4	2022	Jean-Baptiste Ternon (FRA); Gaetan Thomas (BEL)	M M	3d 17h 34m 04s	(RET)		(DPI)	
ABD	FRA 98	REVE A PERTE DE VUE-QWANZA	Tyker 40 Evolution 2	2010	Joel Paris (FRA); Goulven Marie (FRA)	M M	3d 23h 21m 42s	(DNF)			
ABD	BEL 109	INNOVAD.GROUP-XLG	Pogo 40S2	2011	Jerome Delire (BEL); Caroline Dieu (BEL)	M F	4d 14h 19m 42s	(RET)			
ABD	FRA 140	REVE DE LARGE 5	Sabrosa 40 Mk2	2014	Rodolphe Sepho (FRA); Jean-Pierre Coutayar (ARG)	M M	4d 14h 19m 42s	(DNS)			
ABD	FRA 168	RDT LOGISTICS-FORVIS MAZARS	Cape Racing scow 40	2021	Renaud Courbon (FRA); Gilles Courbon (FRA)	M M	4d 14h 19m 42s	(RET)			
ABD	FRA 198	WASABIII	Pogo S4	2023	Stephane Bodin (FRA); Loeiz Cadiou (FRA)	M M	4d 14h 19m 42s	(RET)			
