= IMOCA 60 Charal 2 =

Charal 2
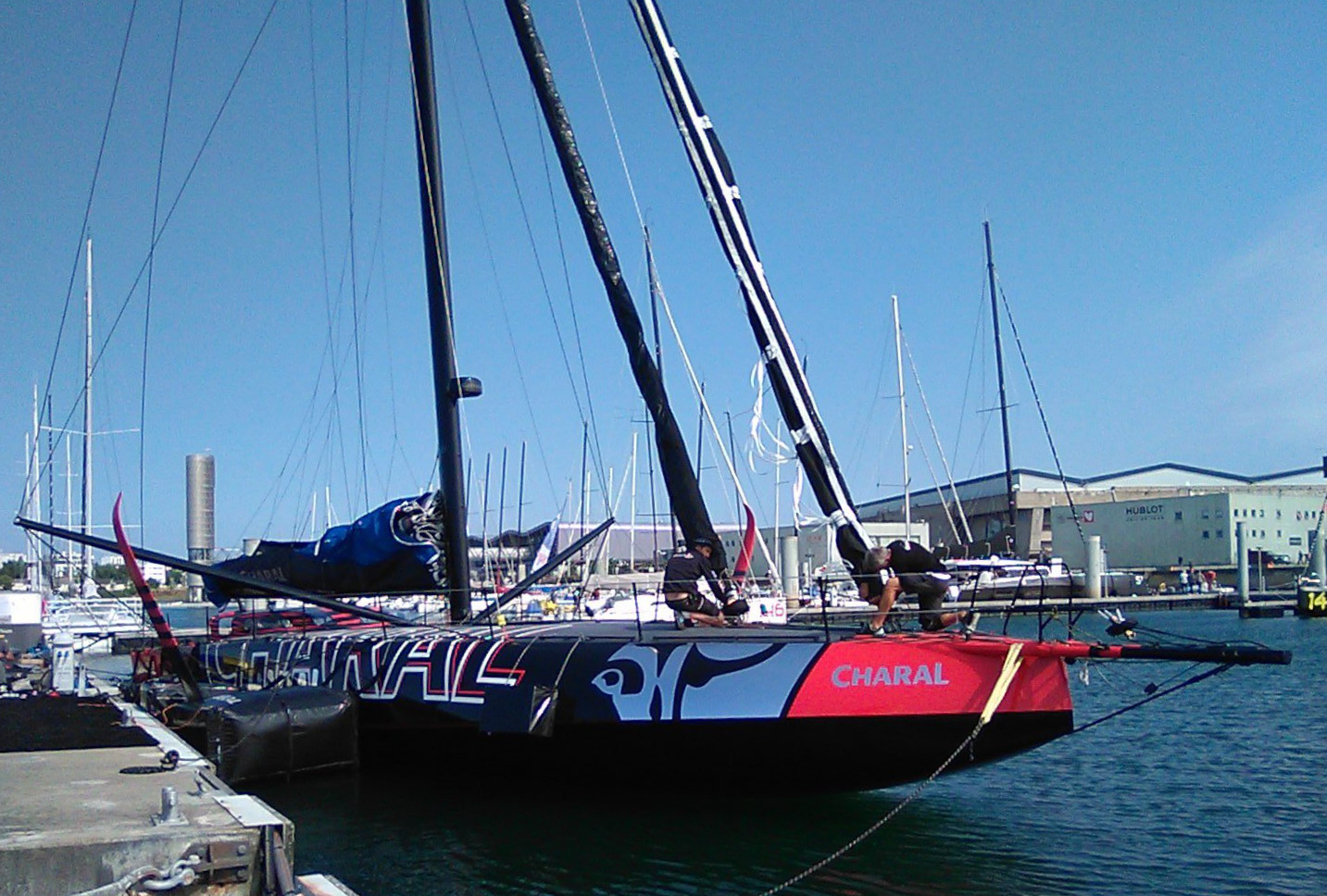

Development
- Designer: Sam Manuard
- Year: 11th July 2022
- Name: Charal 2

Hull appendages
- General: two rudders, two foils
- Keel: canting keel

Racing
- Class association: IMOCA 60

Charal 2 is an IMOCA 60 monohull sailing yacht, designed by Sam Manuard and constructed by CDK Technologies in France, launched on 11th July 2022. It has been designed for the Vendée Globe 2024, a non-stop, round-the-world solo race. Its skipper is the French Jérémie Beyou.

== Design ==
Charal 2 features a very robust design to accommodate the aggressive sailing style its skipper Beyou is known for. Like Sam Manuard's previous design L'Occitane en Provence, it features a SCOW bow, but at the same time is very narrow. Unique is the layout of the two rudders in an inverted V. This allows to get the stern out of the water during foiling, imitating the effect of a t-rudder. For additional performance, the gap between mast boom and cockpit has been closed.

== Racing results ==
Pos	Year	Race	Class	Boat name	(Co-)Skipper	Configuration, Time, Notes	Ref
Transatlantic Races
3	2022	Route de Rhum	IMOCA 60	Charal 2	Jérémie Beyou (FRA)	solo	
1	2025	Transat Café-L'Or	IMOCA 60	Charal 2	Jérémie Beyou (FRA) Morgan Lagravière (FRA)	double handed	
Other Races
1	2023	24h Le Defi Azimut	IMOCA 60	Charal 2	Jérémie Beyou (FRA) Franck Cammas (FRA)	double handed	
2	2023	Guyader Bermudes 1000	IMOCA 60	Charal 2	Jérémie Beyou (FRA) Franck Cammas (FRA)	double handed	
4	2024-2025	Vendée Globe	IMOCA 60	Charal 2	Jérémie Beyou (FRA)	solo	

== See also ==
- Jérémie Beyou (skipper)
- Charal
