= Antoine Cornic =

French offshore yachtsman

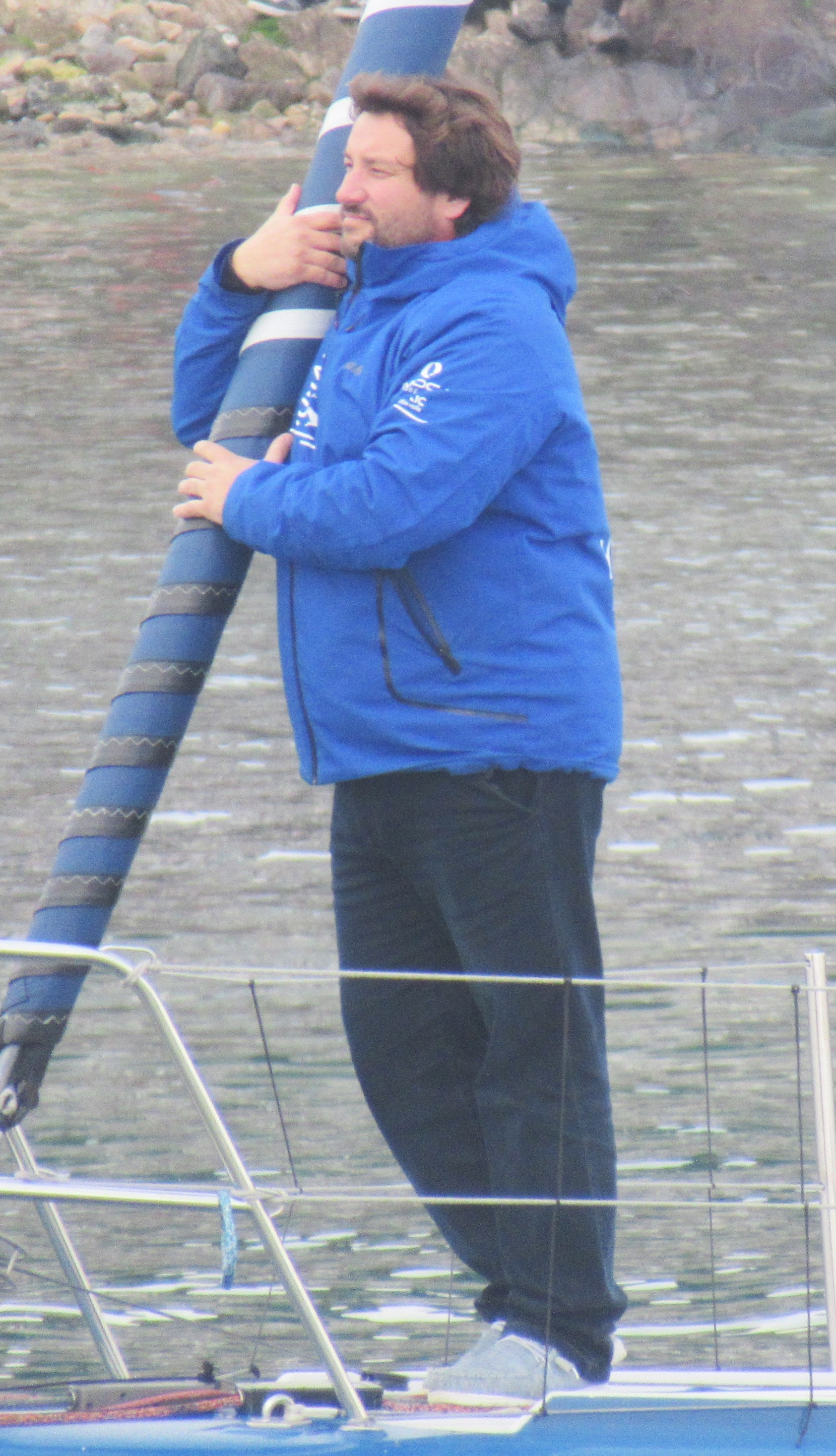
- At the start of the 2024-2025 Vendée Globe

Personal information
- Nationality: France
- Born: 4 January 1980 (age 46) Drancy

Sailing career
- Sport: Sailing
- Club: La Rochelle Nautique
- Class(es): IMOCA 60, Mini 6.50

Antoine Cornic (born 4 January 1980) is a French professional offshore sailor.

== Biography ==
Antoine Julien Cornic was born on 4 January 1980 in Drancy, France. His father sailed on 470 and his mother on Moth-Europe. His younger brother, Laurent, is also a sailor.

Cornic begin sport with judo, and won the French championship in 1997. He then switch to sailing on Mini. He finished 10th in the 2001 Mini Transat. After the loss of his main sponsor, he quit sailing in 2003 and open a first restaurant in Île de Ré where he created a family.

In 2015, he played tighthead prop at Stade Niortais but he came back to Class Mini in 2016. He finished 11th in the 2017 Mini Transat.

In 2018, he purchased the IMOCA 60 Canada and modified it for the 2024–2025 Vendée Globe.

== Results ==
Pos	Year	Race	Class	Boat name	Time	Notes	Ref
Round the world races
28 / 40	2024/25	2024-2025 Vendée Globe	IMOCA 60	Human Immobilier	96d 01h 00m 59s		
Transatlantic Races
30 / 40	2023	2023 Transat Jacques Vabre	IMOCA 60	Human Immobilier	17d 07h 35m 15s	with Jean-Charles Luro (FRA)	
22 / 38	2022	2022 Route du Rhum	IMOCA 60	HUMAN Immobilier - Ebac	14d 07h 34m 25s		
20 / 22	2021	2021 Transat Jacques Vabre	IMOCA 60	Human Immobilier	17d 07h 35m 15s	with Jean-Charles Luro (FRA)	
11 / 26	2017	2017 Mini Transat	Mini Transat 6.50	759 - Destination Ile-de-Ré (Prototype)	27d 05h 03m 45s		
10 / 33	2001	2001 Mini Transat	Mini Transat 6.50	135 - Oceanic (Prototype)			
Other Races
