= IMOCA 60 Canada =

Sailboat

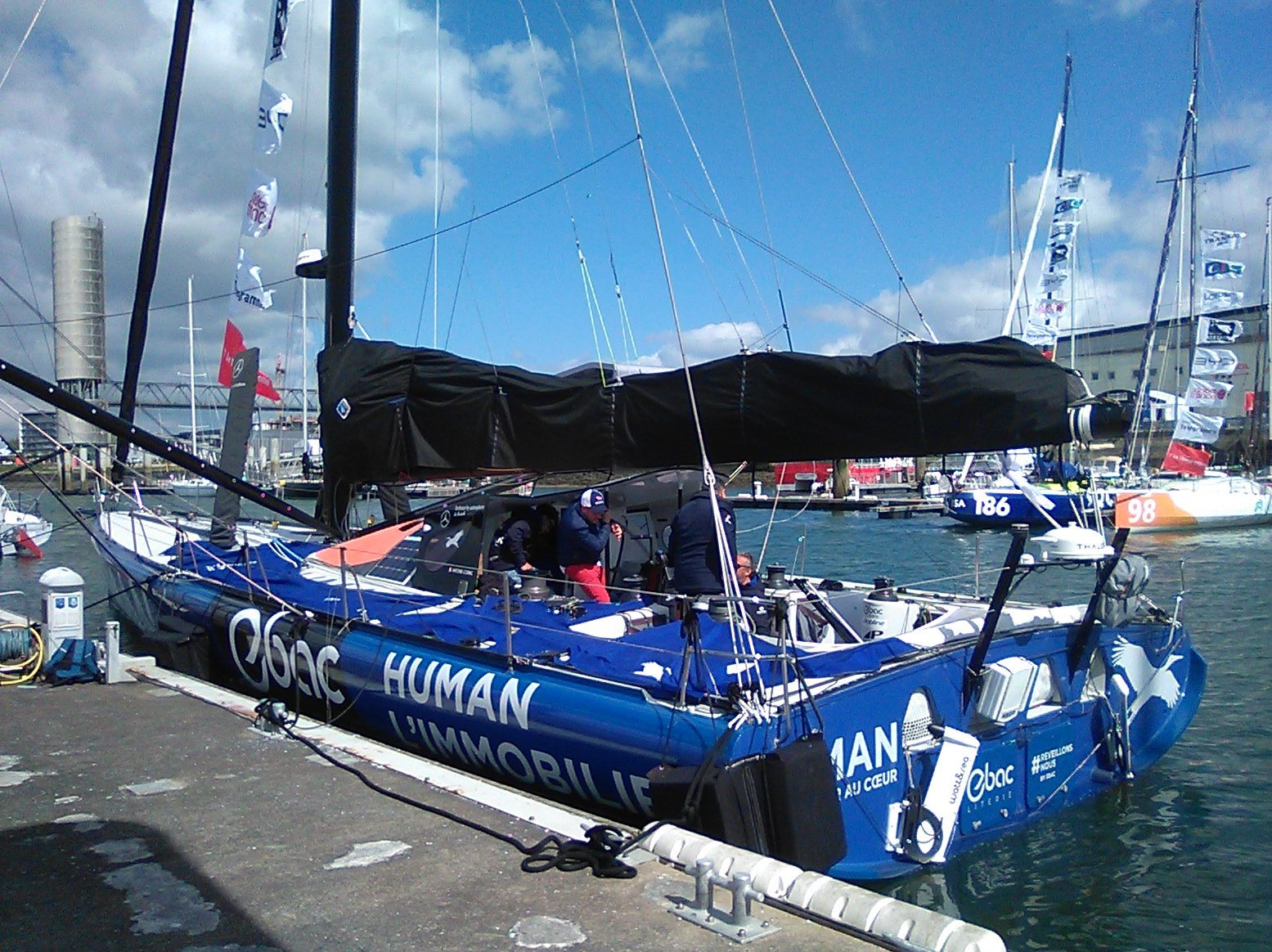

Development
- Designer: Owen Clarke Design

Racing
- Class association: IMOCA 60

The IMOCA 60 class yacht Spirit of Canada was designed by Owen Clark Design, built by first owner Derek Hatfield in Cobourg, Canada, and launched in September 2006.

Purchased by Antoine Cornic in 2020, the boat moved to La Rochelle with the intention of competing in the 2024–2025 Vendée Globe.

== Names and ownership ==
Spirit of Canada (2005-2007)

- Skipper: Derek Hatfield

Algimouss-Spirit of Canada (2008)

- Skipper: Derek Hatfield

O Canada (2011-2017)

- Skipper: Eric Holden and Morgen Watson

O Canada (2019-2020)

- Skipper: Jack Bouttell

Ebac (2020-2022)

- Skipper: Antoine Cornic

Human Immobilier (since 2022)

- Skipper: Antoine Cornic
- Sail no.: FRA 1461

== Racing results ==
Pos	Year	Race	Class	Boat name	Skipper	Notes	Ref
Round the world races
28 / 40	2025	2024–2025 Vendée Globe	IMOCA 60	Human Immobilier	Antoine Cornic (FRA)	96d 01h 00m 59s	
DNF	2009	2008–2009 Vendée Globe	IMOCA 60	Algimouss - Spirit of Canada	Derek Hatfield (CAN)		
Transatlantic Races
26 / 30	2023	Retour à la base	IMOCA 60	Human Immobilier	Antoine Cornic (FRA)	12d 13h 19m 23s	
30 / 34	2023	Transat Jacques-Vabre	IMOCA 60	Human Immobilier	Antoine Cornic (FRA); Jean-Charles Luro (FRA)	17d 7h 35m 15s	
30 / 30	2023	Défi Azimut	IMOCA 60	Human Immobilier	Antoine Cornic (FRA); Jean-Charles Luro (FRA)	2d 14h 31m 00s	
DNF	2023	Guyader Bermudes 1000	IMOCA 60	Human Immobilier	Antoine Cornic (FRA)		
22 / 38	2022	Route du Rhum	IMOCA 60	Human Immobilier	Antoine Cornic (FRA)	14d 7h 34m 25s	
16 / 25	2022	Vendée Arctique	IMOCA 60	Ebac	Antoine Cornic (FRA)	5d 17h 46m 08s	
20 / 24	2022	Guyader Bermudes 1000	IMOCA 60	Ebac	Antoine Cornic (FRA)	7d 6h 15m 00s	
20 / 22	2021	Transat Jacques Vabre	IMOCA 60	Ebac	Antoine Cornic (FRA); Jean-Charles Luro (FRA)	24d 22h 58m 32s	
DNF	2015	Transat Jacques Vabre	IMOCA 60	O Canada, CAN 60	Morgen Watson (CAN); Eric Holden (CAN)		
12 / 15	2007	Transat B to B	IMOCA 60	Algimouss - Spirit of Canada	Derek Hatfield (CAN)	22d 02h 20m	
Other Races
	2011	The Transpac	IMOCA 60	O Canada	Richard Clarke (CAN) + Crew		
