= Jérémie Beyou =

French sailor (born 1976)

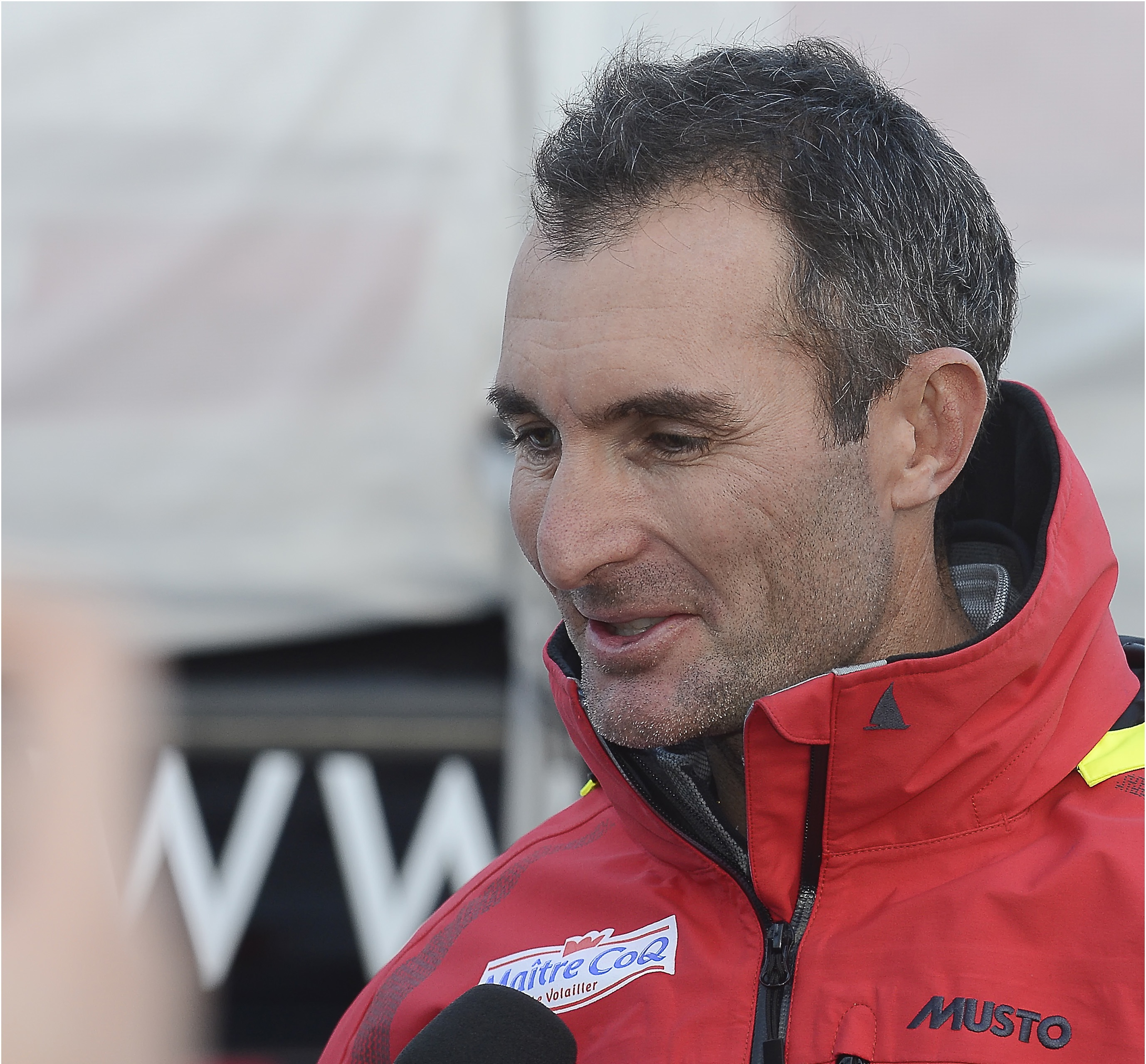
- 2012 Vendee Globe

Personal information
- Born: 27 June 1976 (age 50) Landivisiau (Finistère)

Sailing career
- Sport: Sailing
- Club: C N LORIENT
- Class: IMOCA 60, Figaro

Jérémie Beyou is a French professional offshore sailor born on 27 June 1976 in Landivisiau (Finistère). He is a member of C N Lorient Sailing Club.

He won the Solitaire du Figaro three times, in 2005, 2011 and 2014, and was crowned French champion in solo offshore racing in 2002 and 2005. He also won the Volvo Ocean Race onboard DongFeng and competed in the Vendée Globe five times.

== Career highlights ==
Year	Pos	Event	Class	Boat name	Notes	Ref.
Round the World Races
2025	4 / 40	2024-2025 Vendée Globe	IMOCA 60	Charal 2	74d 12h 56m 54s	
2021	13 / 33	2020-2021 Vendée Globe	IMOCA 60	Charal	89d 18h 55m 58s (restarted 9 days late)	
2018	1	Volvo Ocean Race	Volvo Ocean 65	DongFeng	Fully Crewed Event	
2017	3	2016-2017 Vendée Globe	IMOCA 60	Maître CoQ III	78d 06h 38m 40s	
2013	RET	2012-2013 Vendée Globe	IMOCA 60	Maître CoQ II	Day 9 - Broken Keel Ram	
2009	RET	2008-2009 Vendée Globe	IMOCA 60	Delta Dore	Day 17 - Damaged Rig	
2007	RET	Barcelona World Race	IMOCA 60	Delta Dore	with Sidney Gavignet	
Trans Oceanic Races
2025	1	Transat Cafe-L'Or	IMOCA 60	Charal 2	with Morgan Lagravière	
2022	3	Route de Rhum	IMOCA 60	Charal 2	solo	
2021	3	Transat Jacques Vabre	IMOCA 60	Charal	with Christopher Pratt	
2019	3	Transat Jacques Vabre	IMOCA 60	Charal	with Christopher Pratt	
2018	RET	Route de Rhum	IMOCA 60		solo	
2016	1	Transat New York Vendée	IMOCA 60	Maitre Coq	9d 16h 57m 49s	
2015	RET	Transat Jacques Vabre	IMOCA 60		with Philippe Legros	
2014	2	Route du Rhum	IMOCA 60	Maitre Coq		
2013	3	Transat Jacques Vabre	IMOCA 60	Maitre Coq	with Christopher Pratt	
2011	1	Transat Jacques Vabre	IMOCA 60	Paprec 3	with Jean-Pierre Dick	
2010	19	Transat Ag2r	Beneteau Figaro 2	Generali - Europ Assistance	with Yann Elies	
2009	4	Transat Jacques Vabre	IMOCA 60	Foncia	with Michel Desjoyeaux	
2006	8	Transat Ag2r	Beneteau Figaro 2	DELTA DORE	with Vincent Riou	
2004	6	Transat Ag2r	Beneteau Figaro 2	DELTA DORE	with Christophe De Pavant	
2003	4	Transat Jacques Vabre	IMOCA 60	PRB	with Vincent Riou	
2002	9	Transat Ag2r	Beneteau Figaro	GAME BOY ADVANCE	with Bruno JOURDREN	
2000	3	Transat Ag2r	Beneteau Figaro	VOLKSWAGEN CASTROL	with Pascal BIDÉGORRY	
1998	18	Transat Ag2r	Beneteau Figaro	VOLKSWAGEN - CASTROL	with Armel Le Cleac'h	
1991	-	Mini Transat Race	Mini Transat 6.50			
Other Results
2020	1	Défi Azimut				
2019	1	Défi Azimut				
2018	RET	Défi Azimut				
2020	1	Vendée-Arctique-Les Sables d'Olonne	IMOCA 60	Charal		
2019	1	Rolex Fastnet Race	IMOCA 60	Charal		
2016	1	Transat NY - Vendée				
2015	10	Tour de France à la Voile	Diam 24			
2013	2	Rolex Fastnet Race	IMOCA 60	Maitre Coq		
2019	20	La Solitaire URGO Le Figaro	Bénéteau Figaro 3			
2015	4	La Solitaire du Figaro	Bénéteau Figaro 2			
2014	1	La Solitaire du Figaro	Bénéteau Figaro 2			
2013	5	La Solitaire du Figaro	Bénéteau Figaro 2			
2011	1	La Solitaire du Figaro	Bénéteau Figaro 2	BPI		
2005	1	La Solitaire du Figaro	Bénéteau Figaro 2	Delta Dore		
2004	3	La Solitaire du Figaro	Bénéteau Figaro 2	Delta Dore		
2001	4	La Solitaire du Figaro	Bénéteau Figaro	Volkswagen		
