= Thomas Ruyant =

French sailor (born 1981)

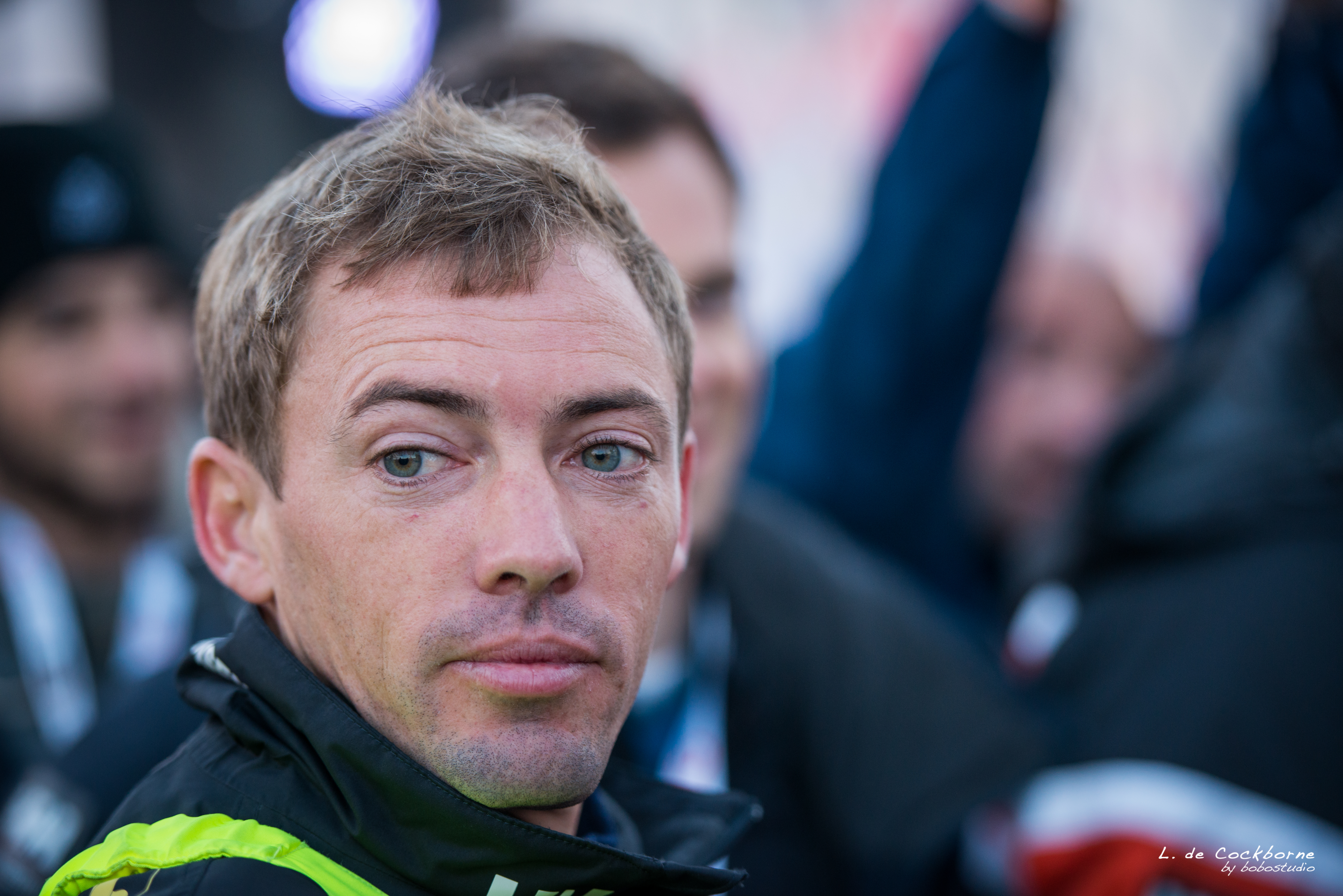

Personal information
- Nationality: French
- Born: 24 May 1981 (age 45) Dunkirk

Sailing career
- Sport: Sailing

Thomas Ruyant (born 24 May 1981) is a French sailor who was born in Dunkirk in the Nord region.

He is an offshore sailor and competed in the 2020–2021 Vendée Globe IMOCA 60 onboard LinkedOut, named after a French employment charity. Ruyant started the Vendée Globe 2020 on 8 November 2020 and crossed the finish line on 28 January 2021 at 05:42:01 UTC+1 in 4th place with a time of 80d 15h 22m 01s. Due to the time credits of Jean Le Cam and Boris Herrmann he was officially ranked in 6th place. In 2021 he proved the potential of his boat, winning the Transat Jacques Vabre together with Morgan Lagravière.

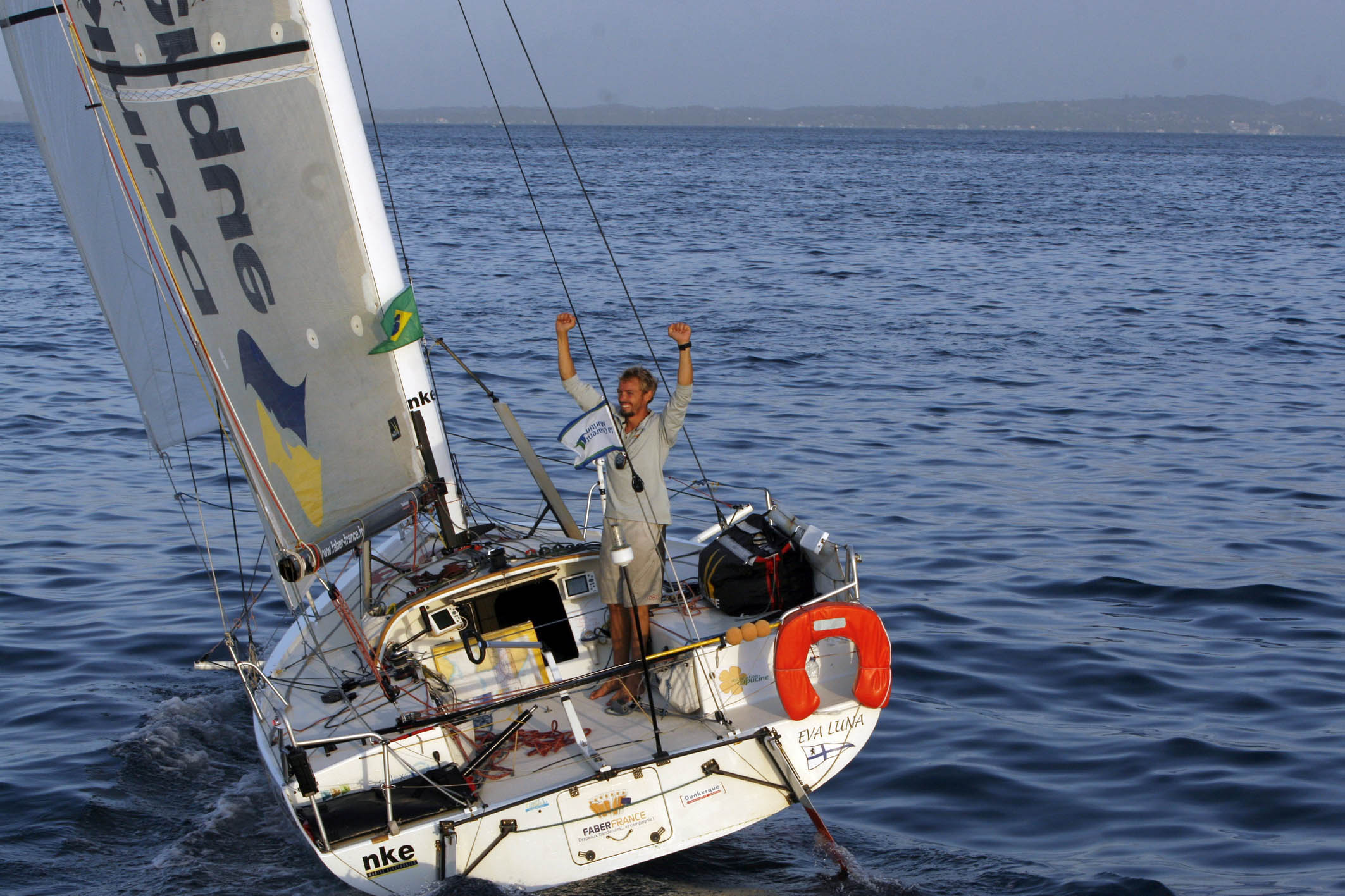
Ruyant onboard his Mini Transat
