= IMOCA 60 Macif =

Sailboat

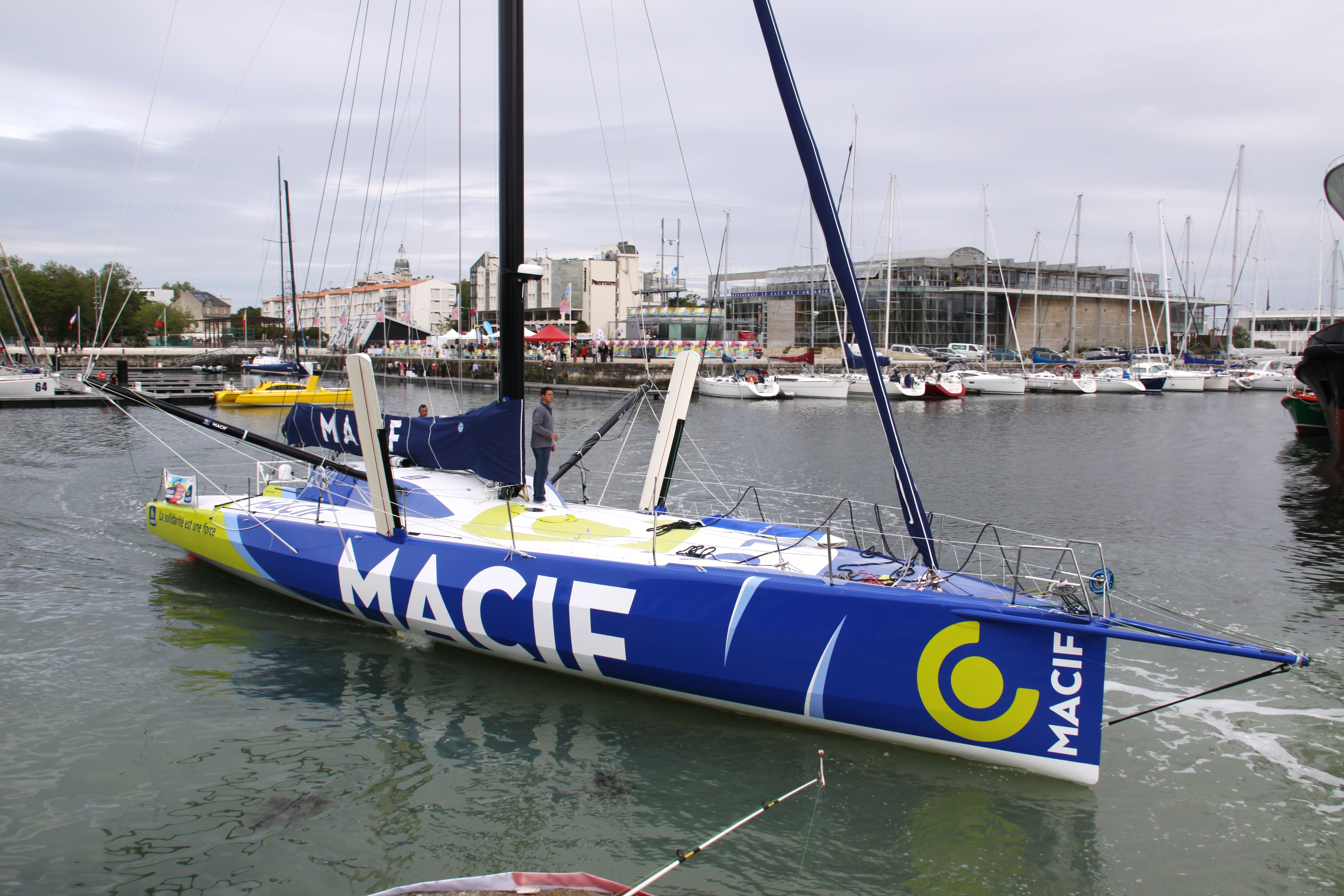

Development
- Designer: Guillaume Verdier, VPLP Design
- Year: 16 August 2011
- Builders: Green Marine Boatbuilders, CDK Technologies
- Previous Name: SMA; Banque Populaire X
- Launch Name: MACIF - FRA 301

Launched as MACIF - FRA 301, the yacht is an IMOCA 60 monohull sailing yacht, designed by Guillaume Verdier and VPLP and built jointly by Green Marine in the United Kingdom and CDK Technologies in France.

== Names and ownership ==
MACIF (2011-2014)

- Skipper: François Gabart
- Sail No.: FRA 301

The boat was commissioned for François Gabart to compete in 2012–2013 Vendée Globe.

SMA (2012-2018)

- Skipper: Paul Meilhat

In 2015 the boat was put into partnership with Paul Meilhat and rebranded as SMA with the intention to compete in 2016-2017 Vendée Globe

Banque Populaire X (2019-2021)

- Skipper: Clarisse Cremer

In 2019 the boat was purchased by Banque Populaire Sailing Team who had sold there race winning boat but decided to back French offshore sailor Clarisse Cremer in her attempt to complete the 2020-2021 Vendée Globe.

Monnoyeur - Duo For a Job (since 2022)

- Skipper: Benjamin Ferré
- Sail No.: FRA 30

== Racing results ==
Pos	Year	Race	Class	Boat name	Skipper	Notes	Ref
Round the world races
12 / 33	2020	2020–2021 Vendée Globe	IMOCA 60	Banque Populaire X - FRA 30	Clarisse Cremer (FRA)	87d 02h 24m 25s	
DNF	2016	2016–2017 Vendée Globe	IMOCA 60	SMA	Paul Meilhat (FRA)		
1 / 20	2012	2012–2013 Vendée Globe	IMOCA 60	MACIF	François Gabart (FRA)	78d 2h 16m 40s	
Transatlantic Races
10	2019	Transat Jacques Vabre	IMOCA 60	Banque Populaire X - FRA 30	Armel Le Cleach (FRA); Clarisse Cremer (FRA)		
2 / 13	2017	Transat Jacques Vabre	IMOCA 60	SMA	Gwénolé Gahinet (FRA); Paul Meilhat (FRA)		
4 / 13	2011	Transat Jacques Vabre	IMOCA 60	MACIF	Sebastien Col (FRA); François Gabart (FRA)		
1 / 20	2018	Route du Rhum	IMOCA 60	SMA	Paul Meilhat (FRA)	12j11h23	
1 / 9	2014	Route du Rhum	IMOCA 60	MACIF	François Gabart (FRA)	12j04h38	
Other Races

== Galerie ==
=== MACIF ===
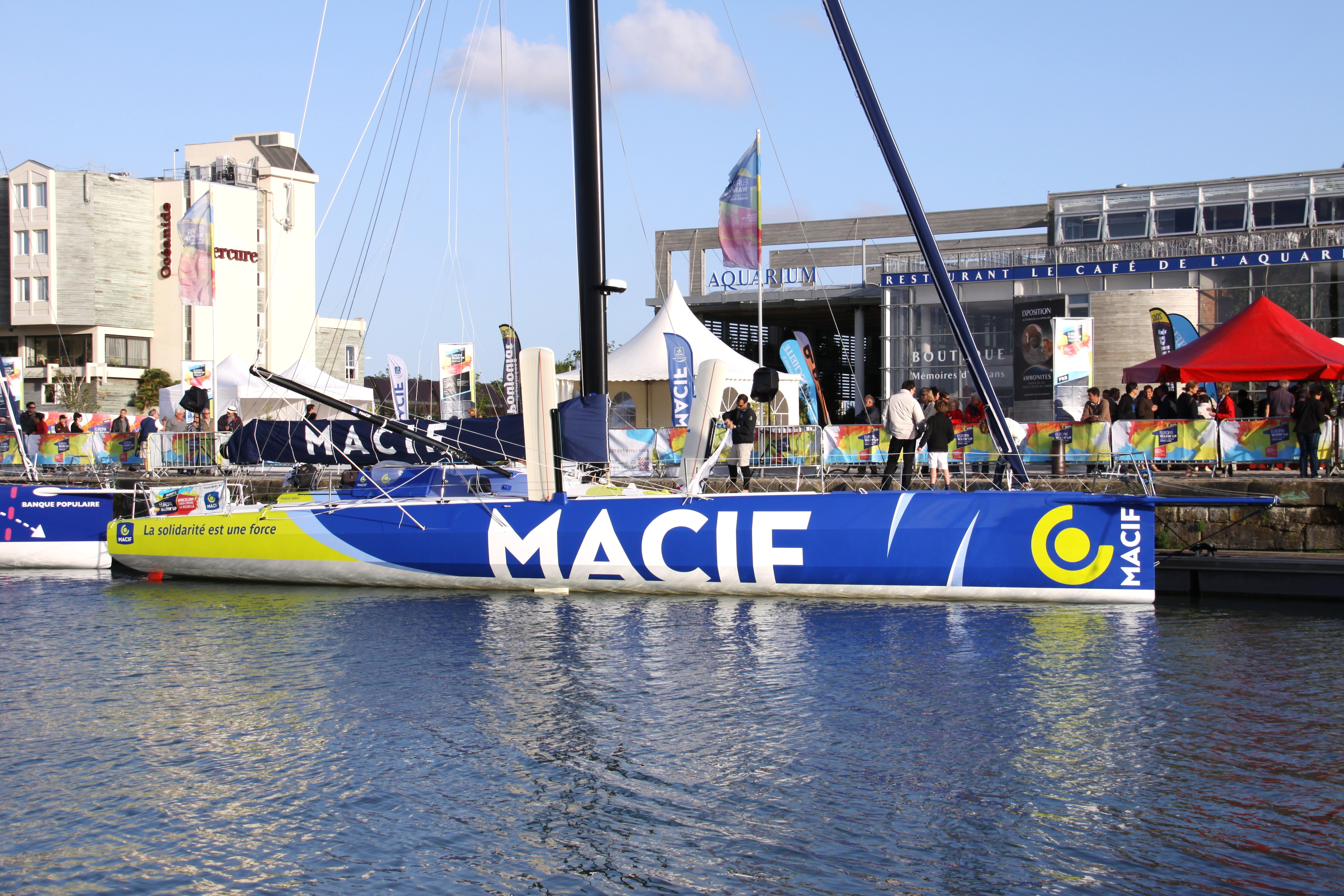

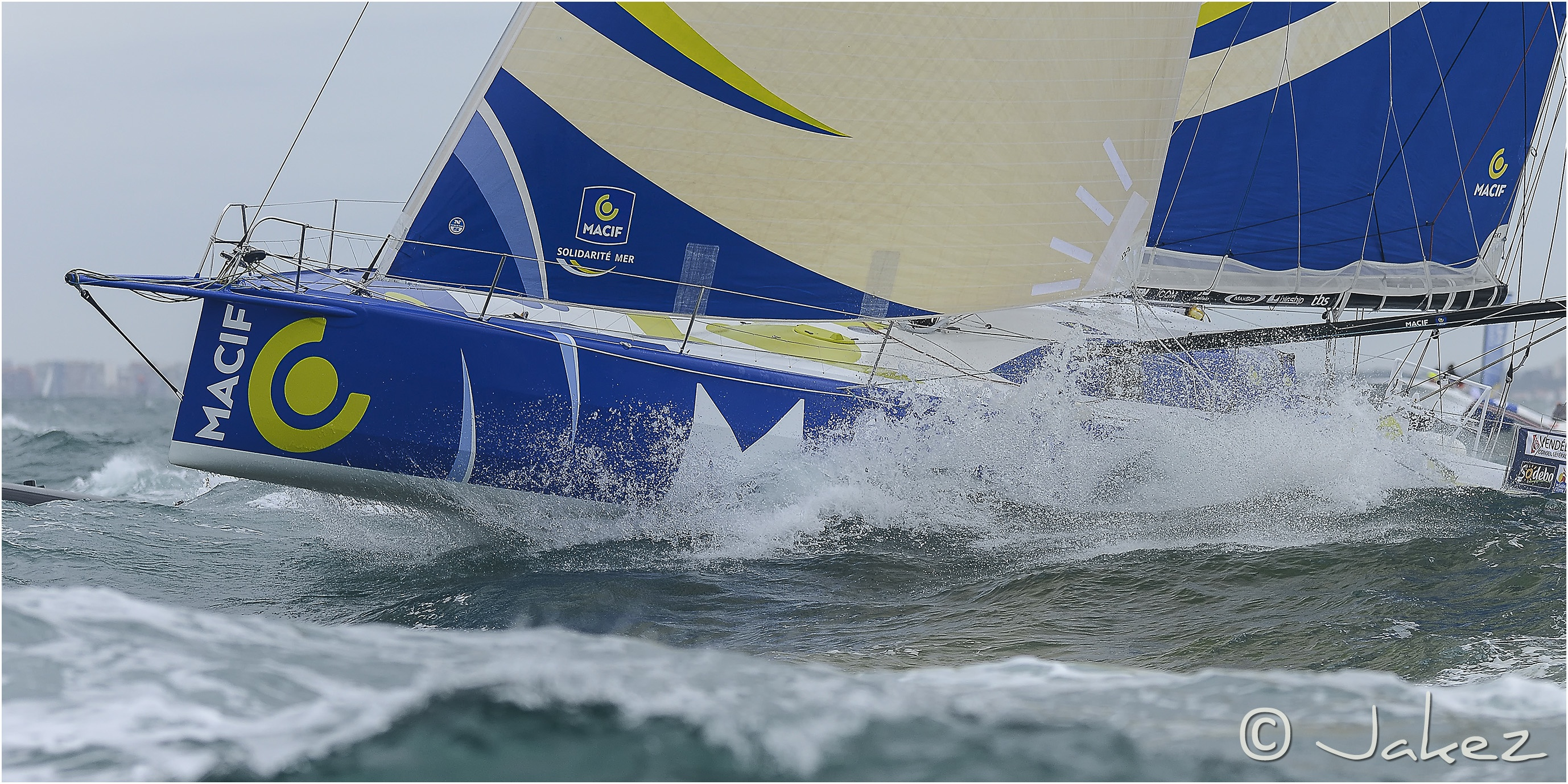

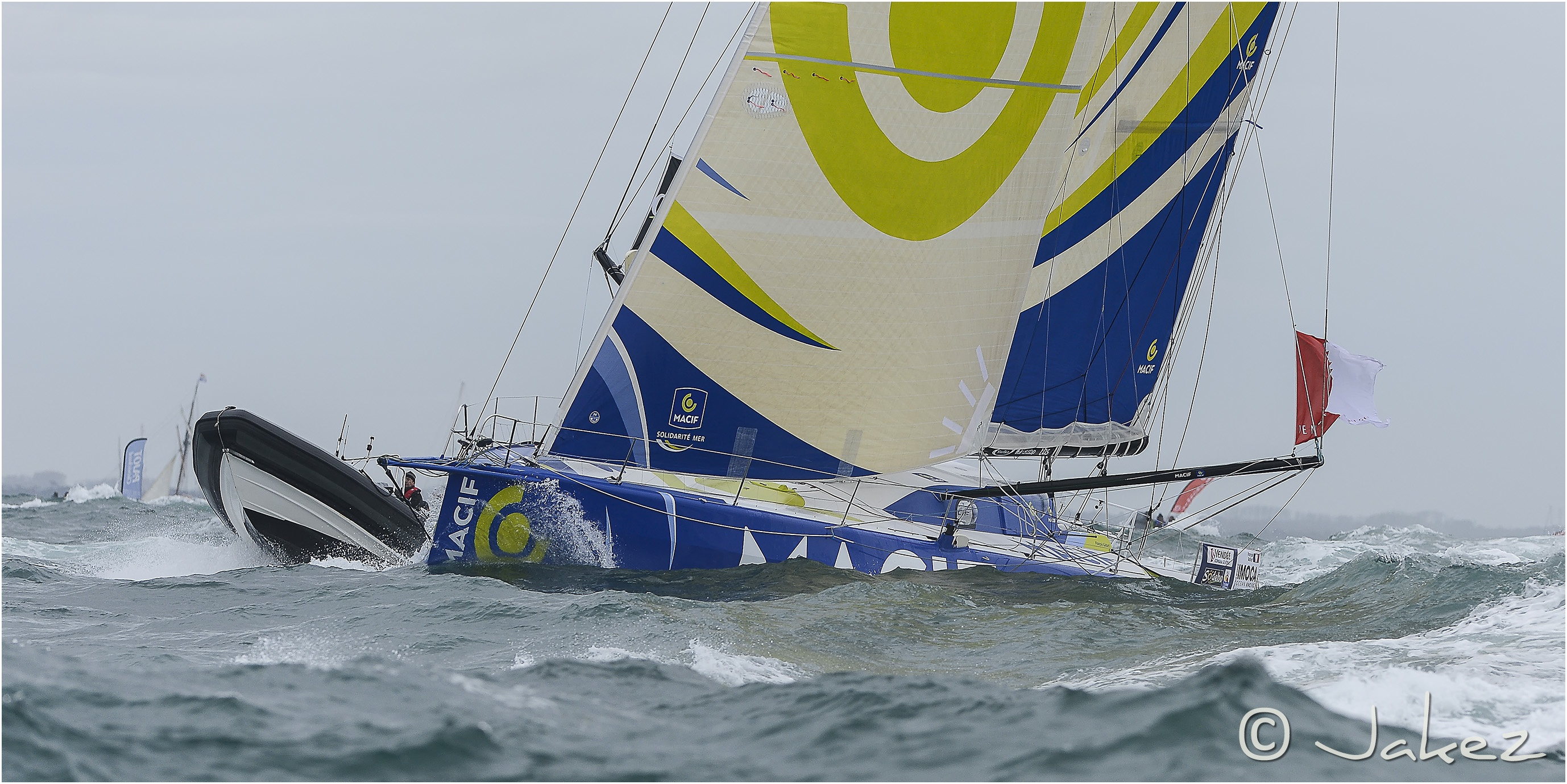

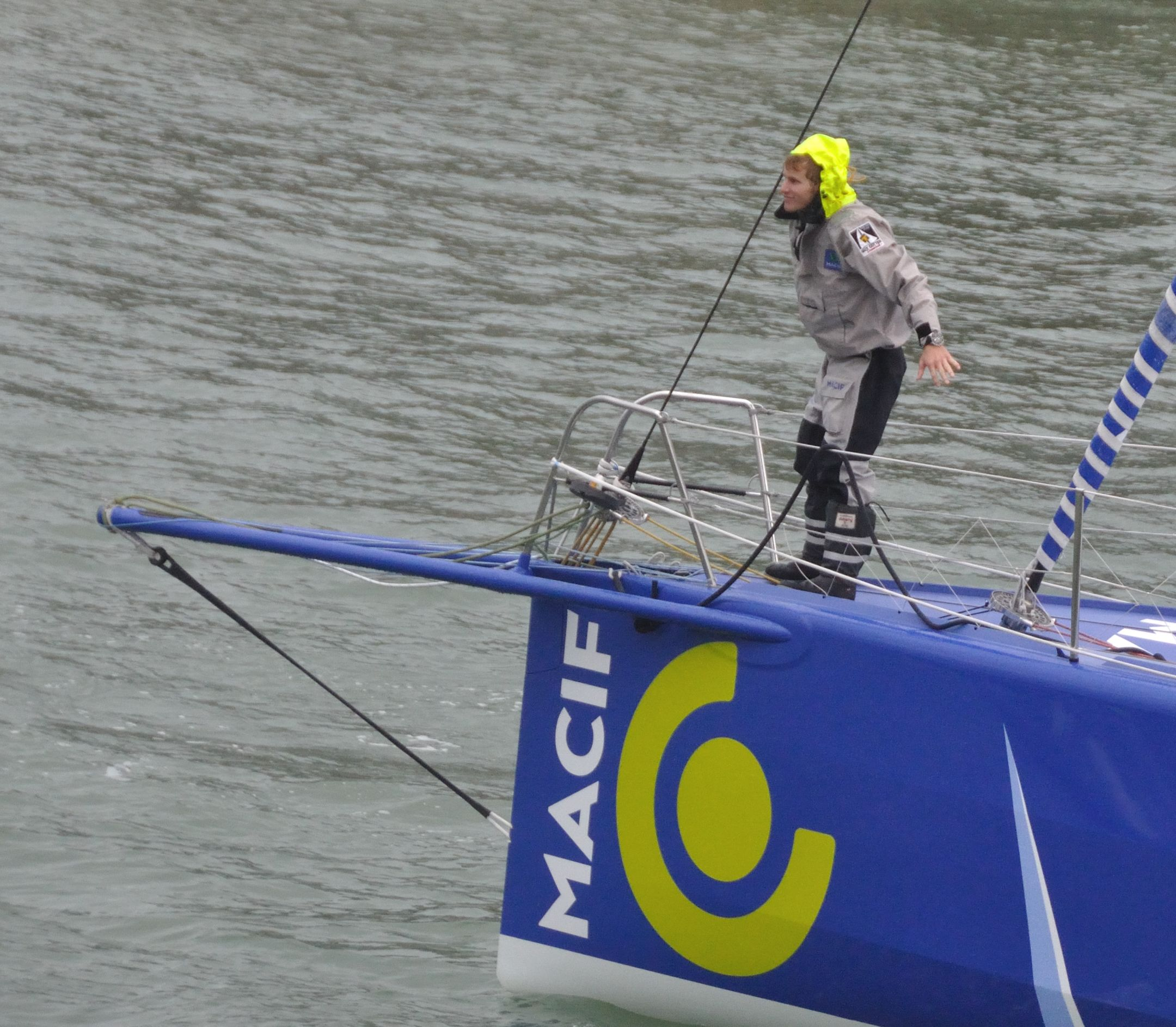

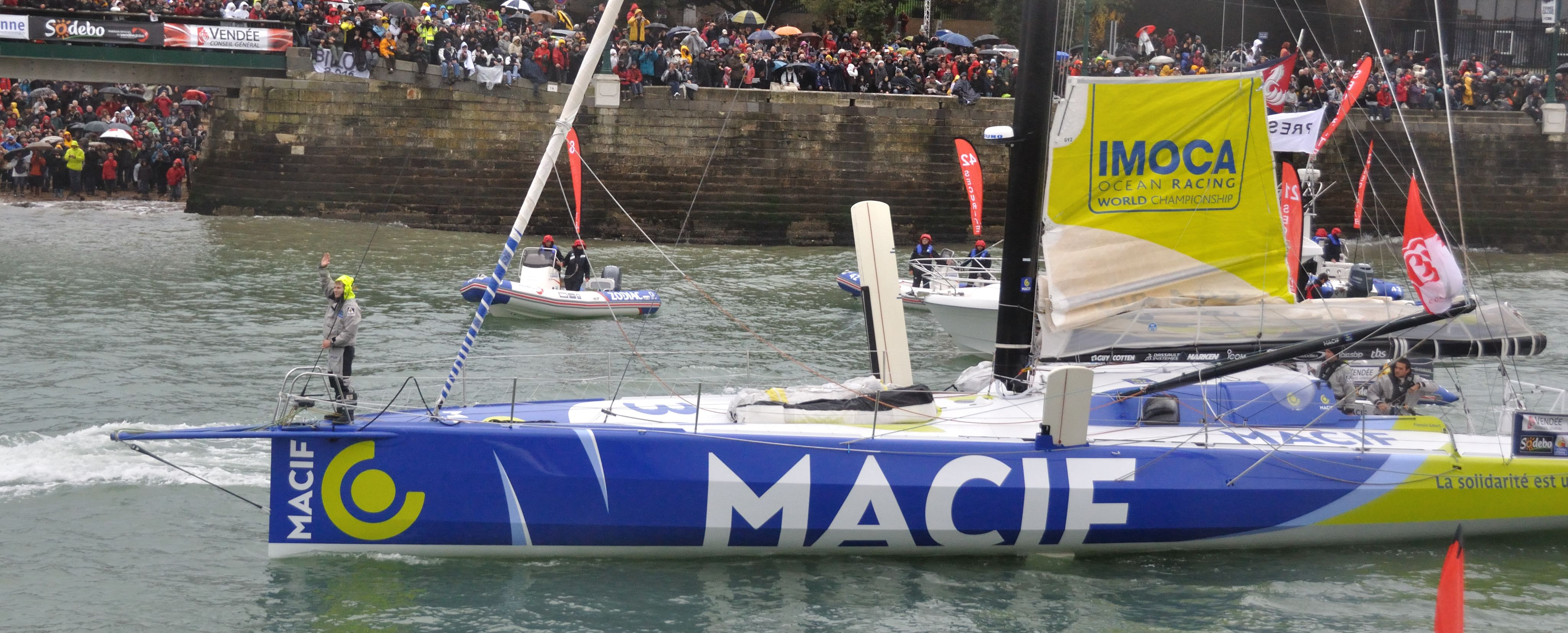

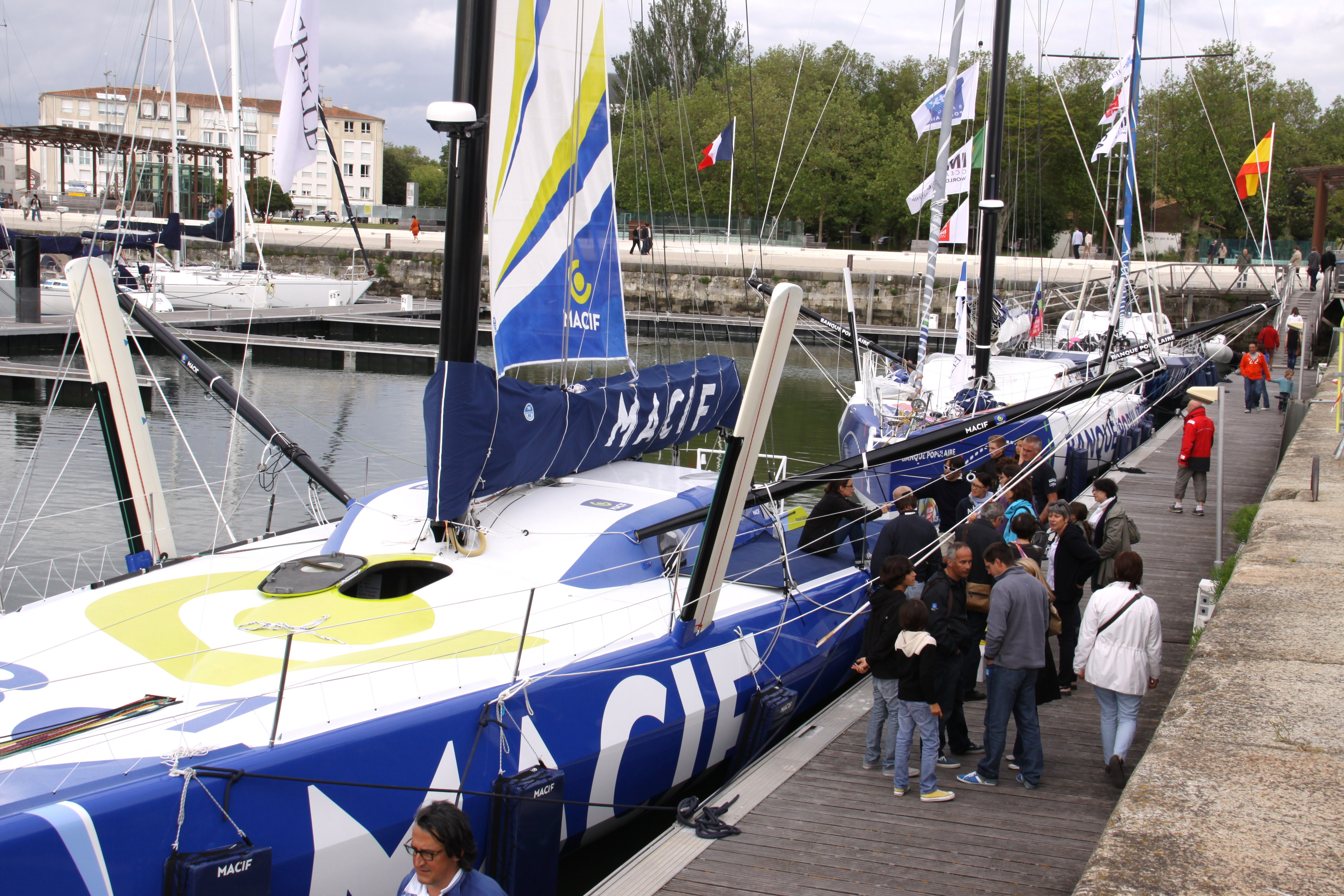

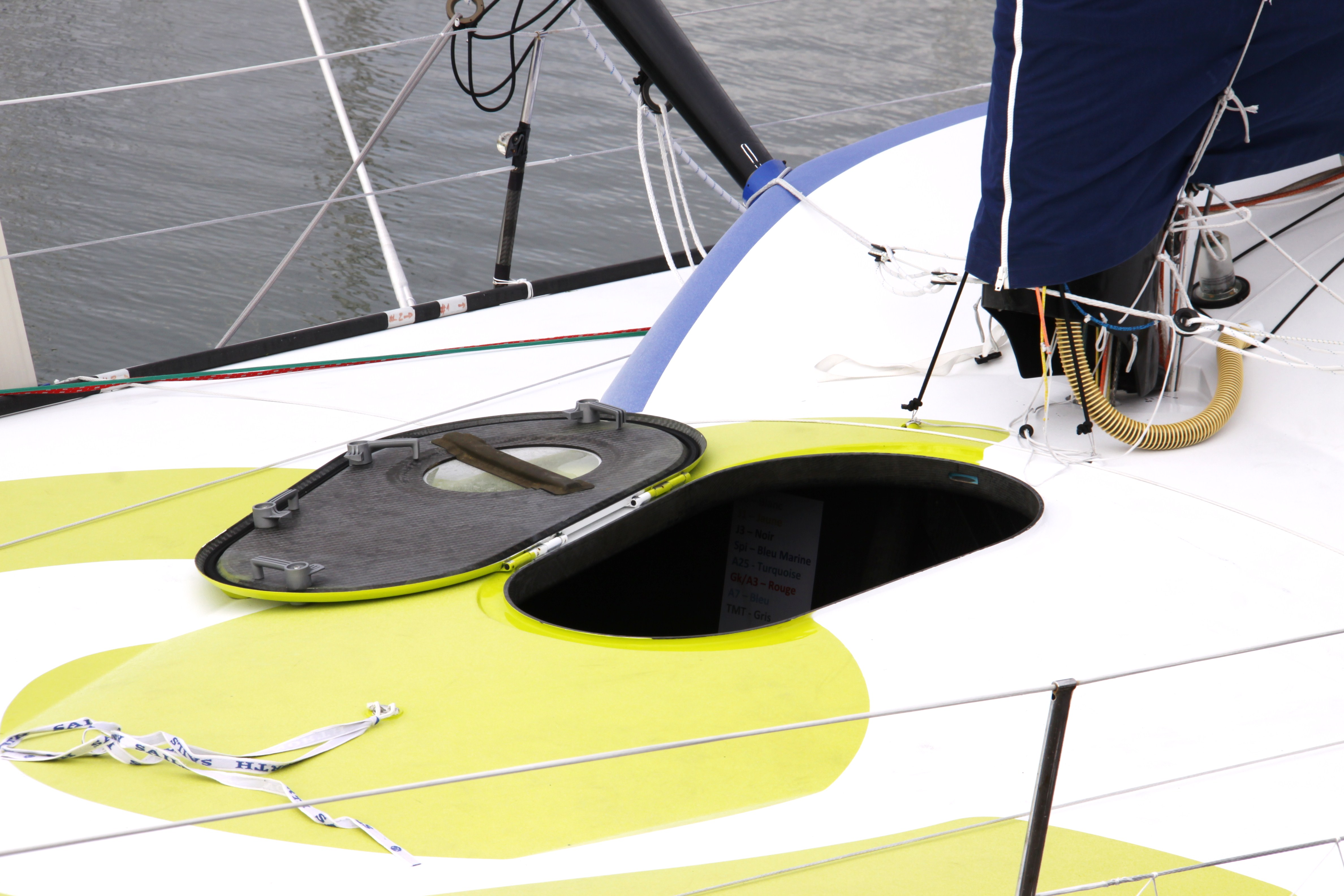

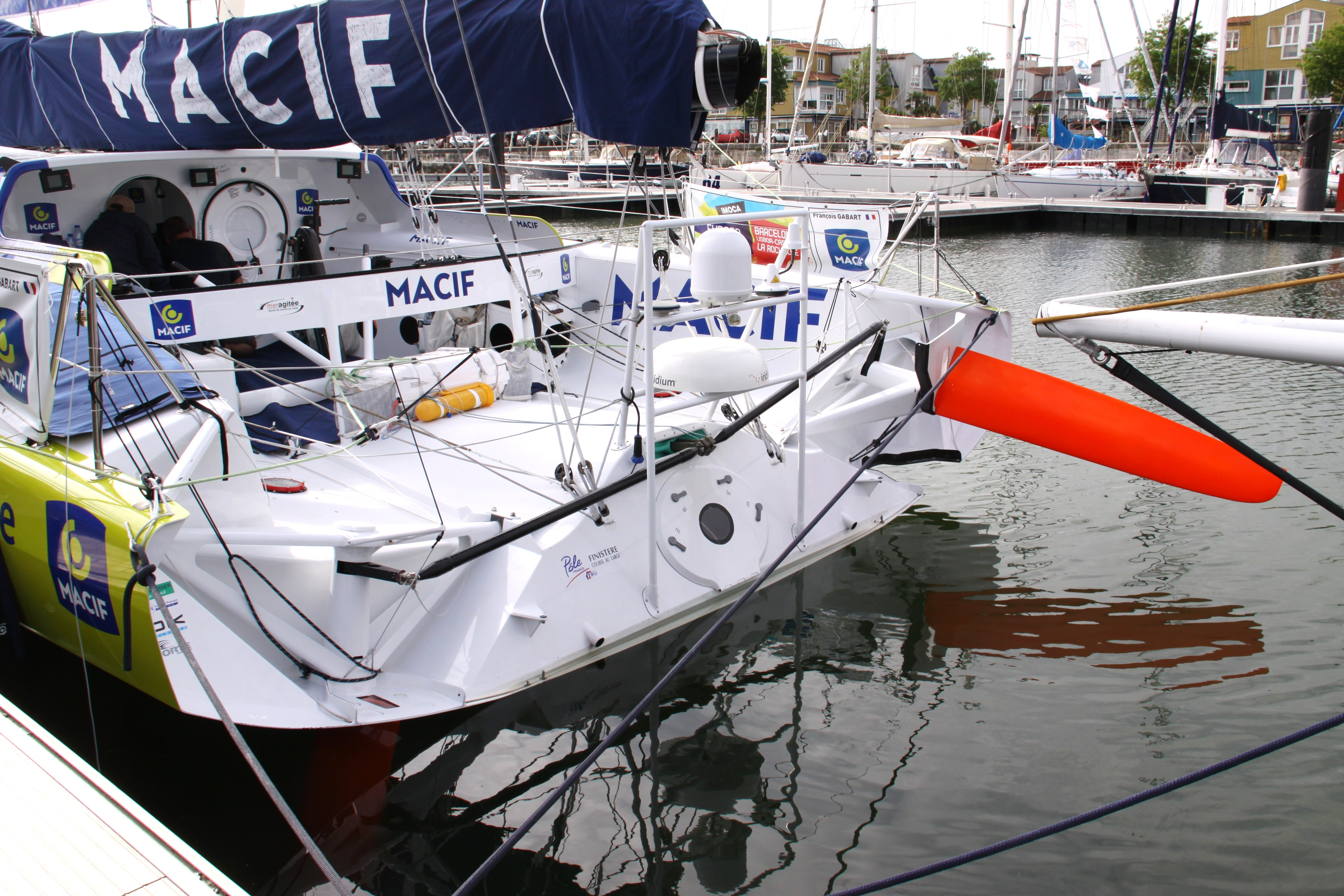

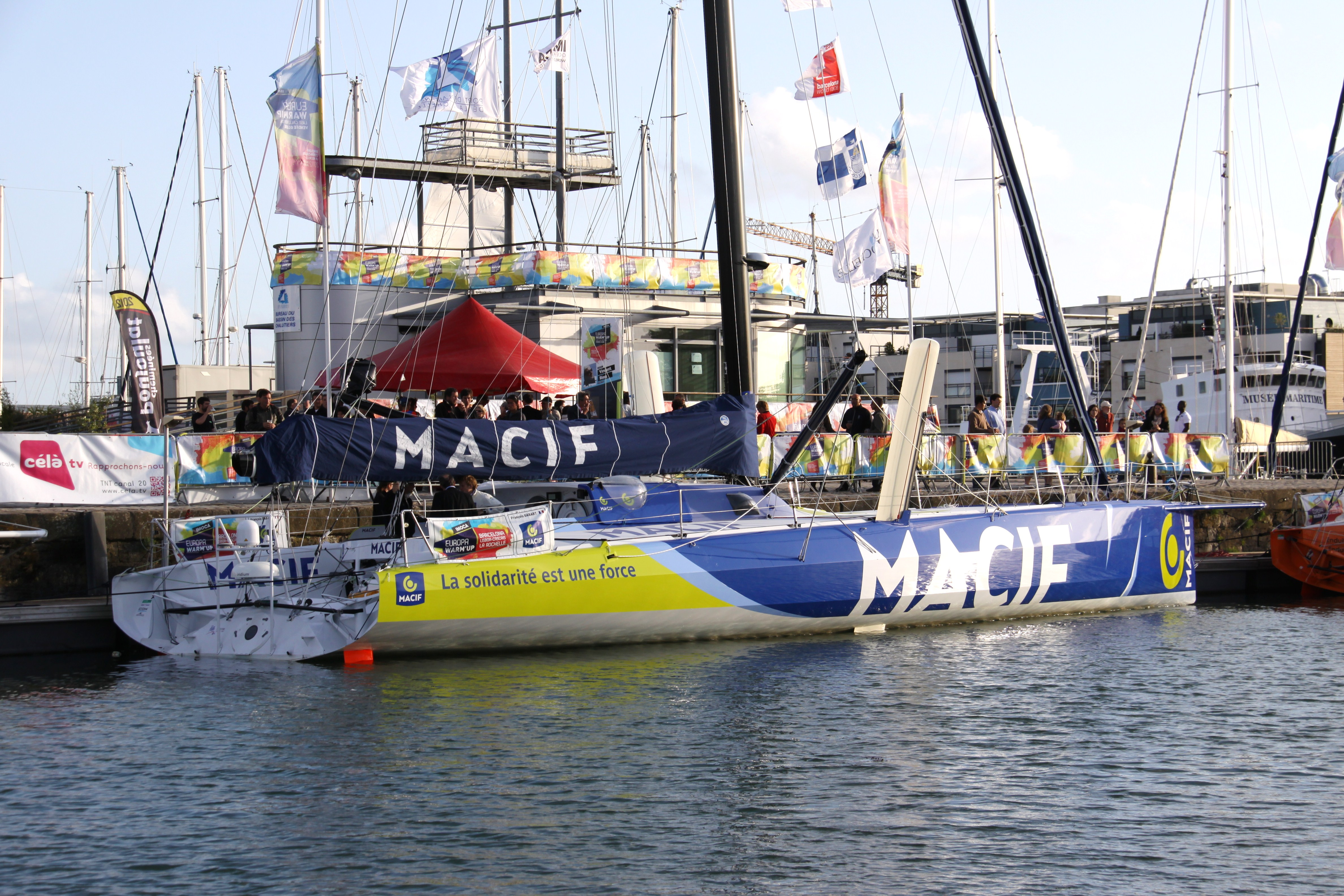

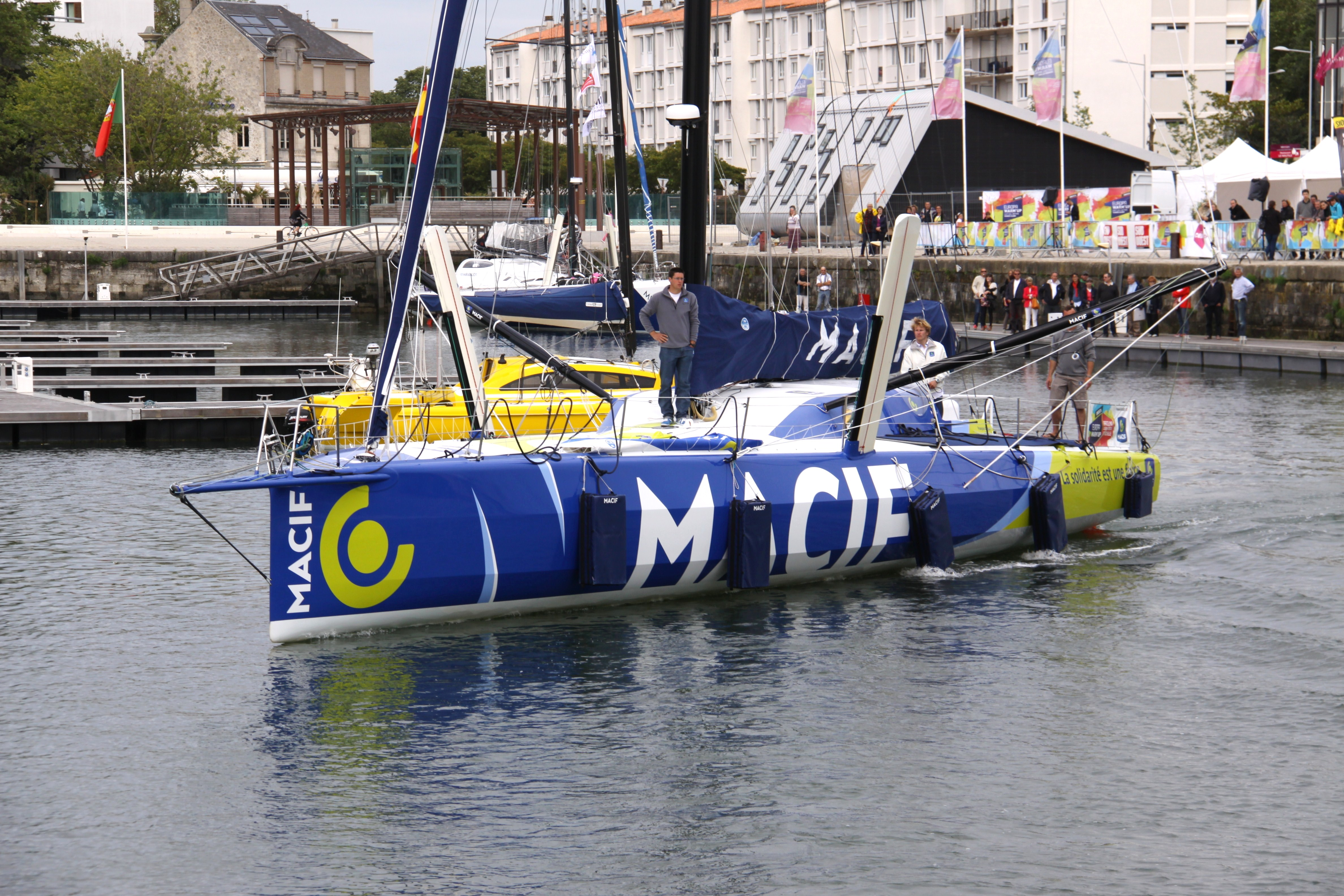

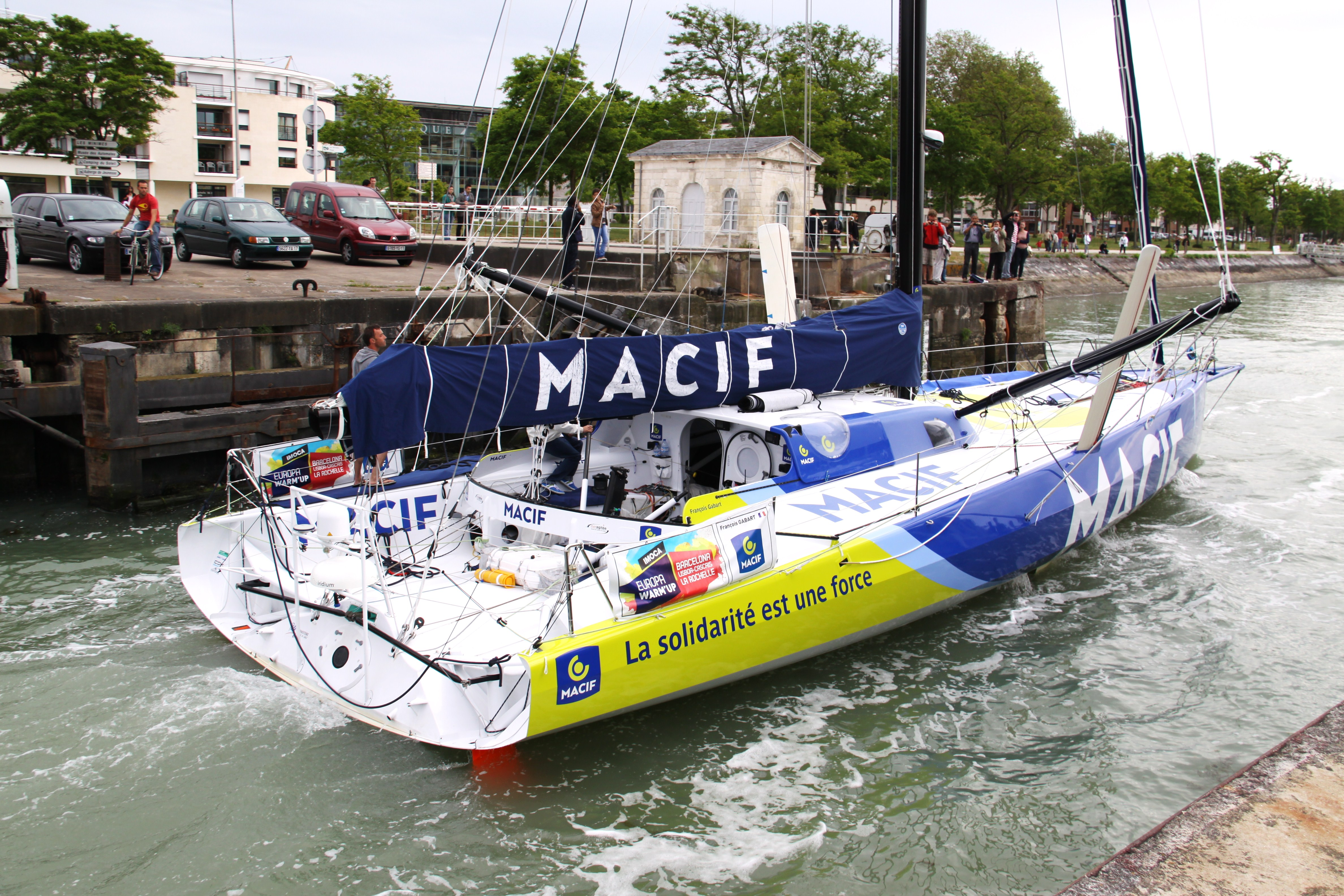

=== SMA ===
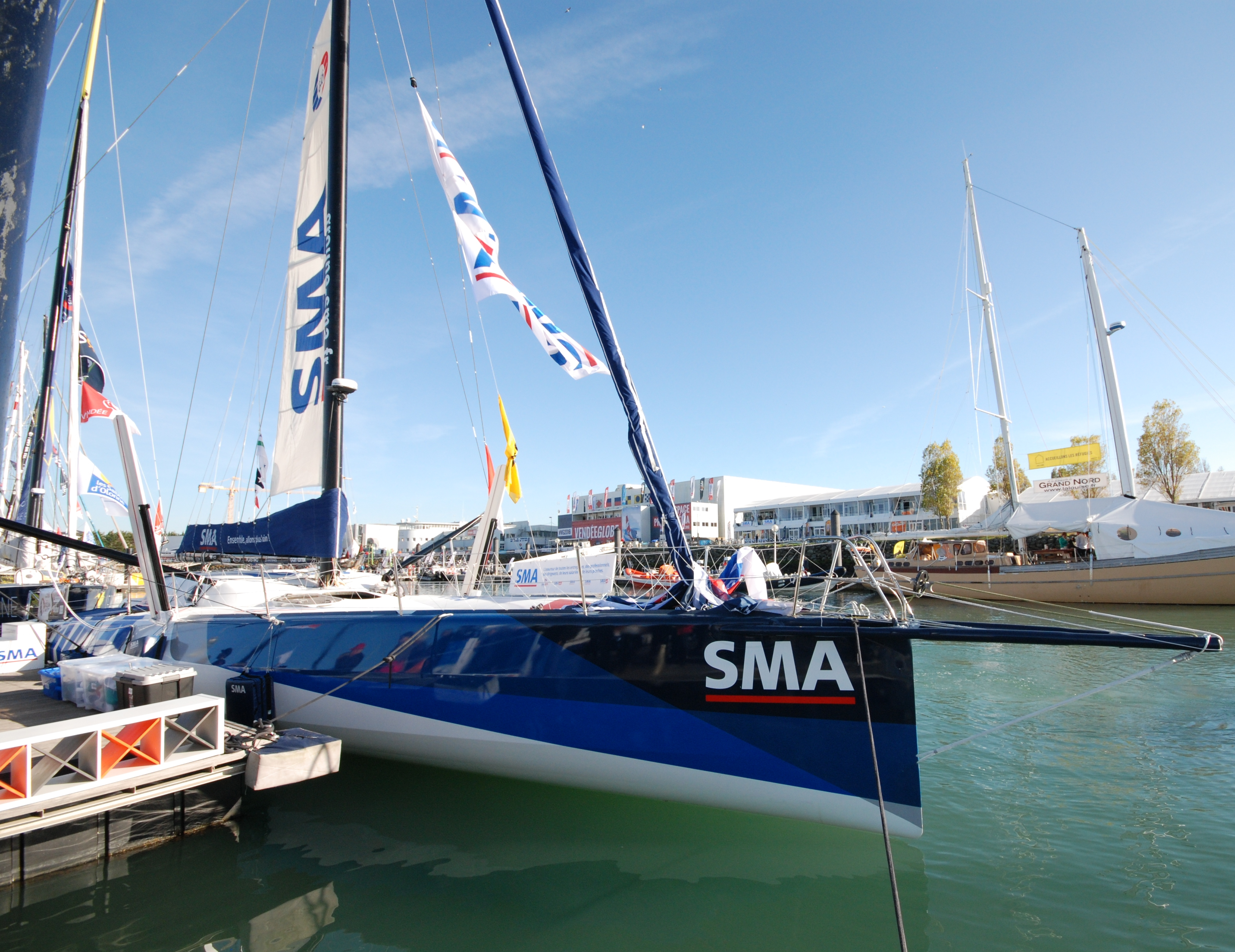

=== Banque Populaire X ===
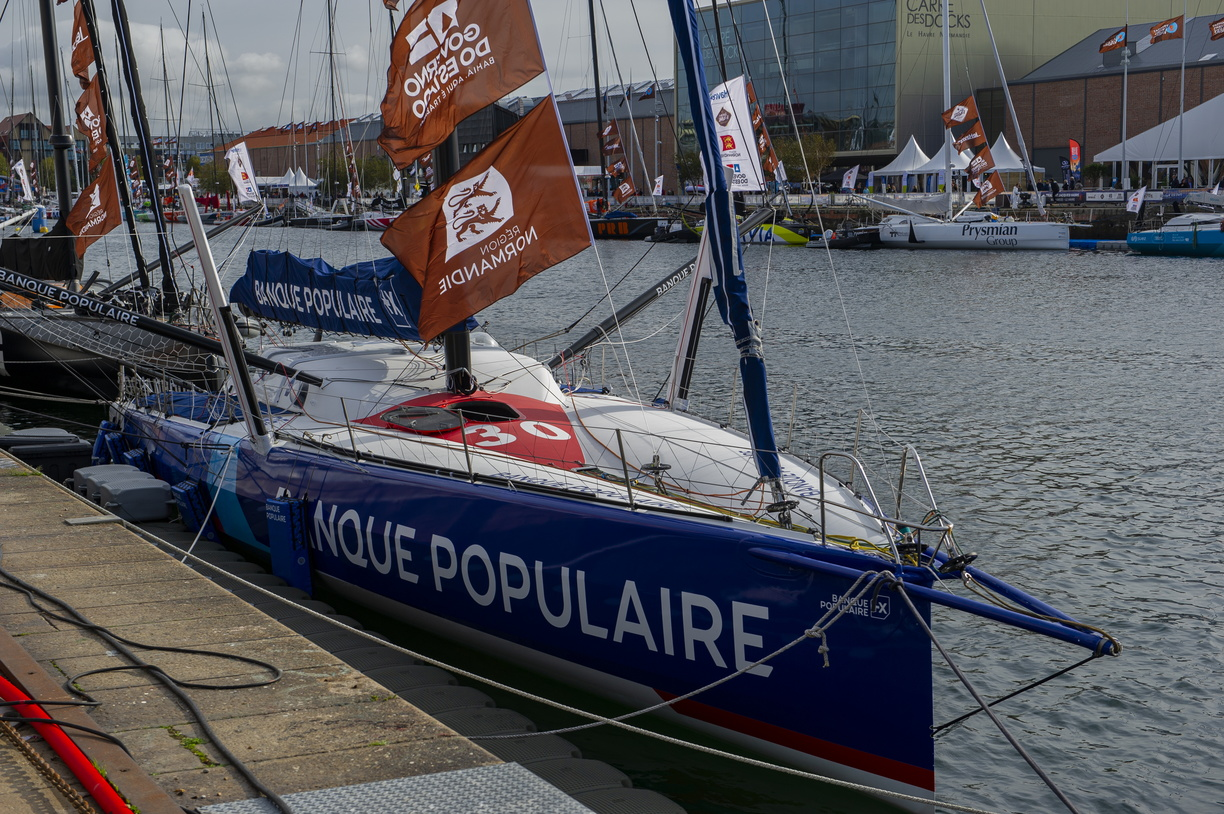
