= IMOCA 60 Charal =

IMOCA 60 Racing Yacht

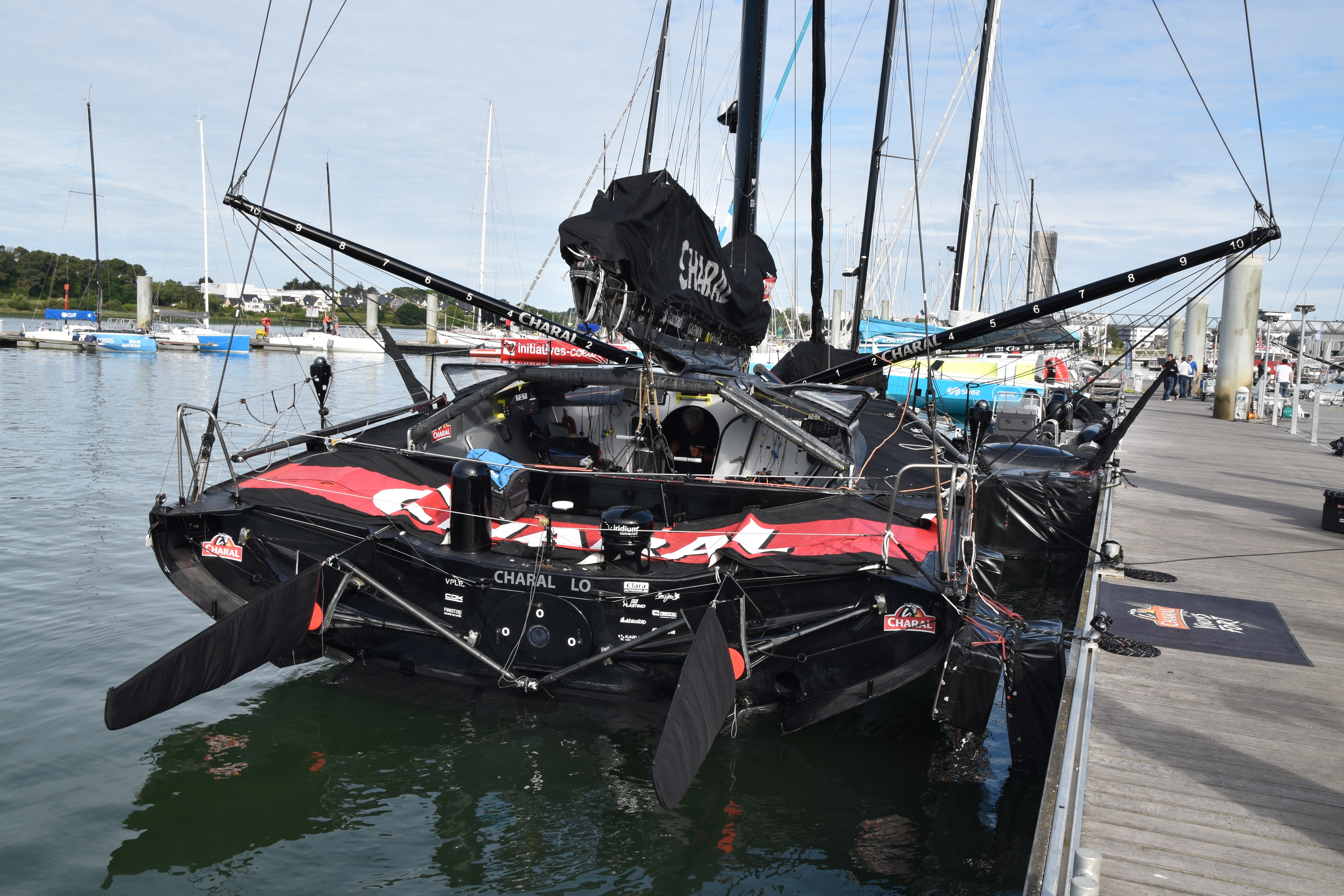

Development
- Designer: VPLP Design, Gurit (United Kingdom)
- Builder: CDK Technologies
- Draft: 5.9 m (19 ft)

Hull
- Beam: 5.9 m (19 ft)

Racing
- Class association: IMOCA 60

The IMOCA 60 class yacht Charal was designed by VPLP Design Office in partnership with Gurit for the structural design. The boat was launched on 20 August 2018 after being assembled by CDK Technologies based in Port La Forêt, Lorient in France.

The boat was very much a multinational project with hull mould constructed by SRG in Spain, and the deck mould Green Marine in United Kingdom. The one design element of the class keel was mandated from (AMPM) and the mast mandatory mast manufacturer of (Lorima).

== Names and ownership ==
Charal (2018-2022)

- Skipper: Jérémie Beyou
- Sail no.: FRA 08

Teamwork (since 2022)

- Skipper: Justine Mettraux
- Sail no.: FRA 08

== Racing results ==
Pos	Year	Race	Class	Boat name	Skipper	Notes	Ref
Round the world races
8 / 40	2025	2024–2025 Vendée Globe	IMOCA 60	TeamWork.net	Justine Mettraux (SUI)	76d 01h 36m 52s	
6 / 33	2021	2020–2021 Vendée Globe	IMOCA 60	Charal	Jérémie Beyou (FRA)	89d 18h 55m 58s	
Transatlantic Races
3 / 22	2021	Transat Jacques Vabre	IMOCA 60	Charal	Jérémie Beyou (FRA); Christopher Pratt (FRA)	19d 14h 59m	
3 / 29	2019	Transat Jacques Vabre	IMOCA 60	Charal	Jérémie Beyou (FRA); Christopher Pratt (FRA)		
DNF	2018	Route du Rhum	IMOCA 60	Charal	Jérémie Beyou (FRA)		
Other Races
2 / 12	2021	Rolex Fastnet Race	IMOCA 60	Charal	Jérémie Beyou (FRA); Christopher Pratt (FRA)	2d 23h 10m	
