= IMOCA 60 Union Bancaire Privée =

Sailboat

Development
- Designer: Finot-Conq, Group Finot
- Builder: JMV Industries

Racing
- Class association: IMOCA 60

The IMOCA 60 class yacht Union Bancaire Privee was designed by Finot-Conq and launched in 1999 after being made by JMV in Cherbourg in France.

== Racing results ==
Pos	Year	Race	Class	Boat name	Skipper	Notes	Ref
Round the world races
2 / 7	2005	2005–2006 Velux 5 Oceans Race	IMOCA 60	Spirit of Yukoh, JPN 11	Kojiro Shiraishi (JPN)	118d 01h 42m	
4 / 20	2004	2004–2005 Vendée Globe	IMOCA 60	Temenos	Dominique Wavre (SUI)	92d 17h 13m	
5 / 27	2002	2000–2001 Vendée Globe	IMOCA 60	Union Bancaire Privee	Dominique Wavre (SUI)	105d 02h 45m	
Transatlantic Races
2 / 17	2004	The Transat	IMOCA 60	Téménos	Dominique Wavre (SUI); Mike Golding (GBR)	12d 18h 21m	
7 / 17	2003	Transat Jacques Vabre	IMOCA 60	Carrefour Prévention	Dominique Wavre (SUI); Michèle Paret (FRA)	19d 12h 54m 40s	
7 / 12	2001	Transat Jacques Vabre	IMOCA 60	Téménos	Dominique Wavre (SUI); Michèle Paret (FRA)	17d 05h 30m	
Other Races
