= IMOCA 60 Aviva 222 =

Sailboat

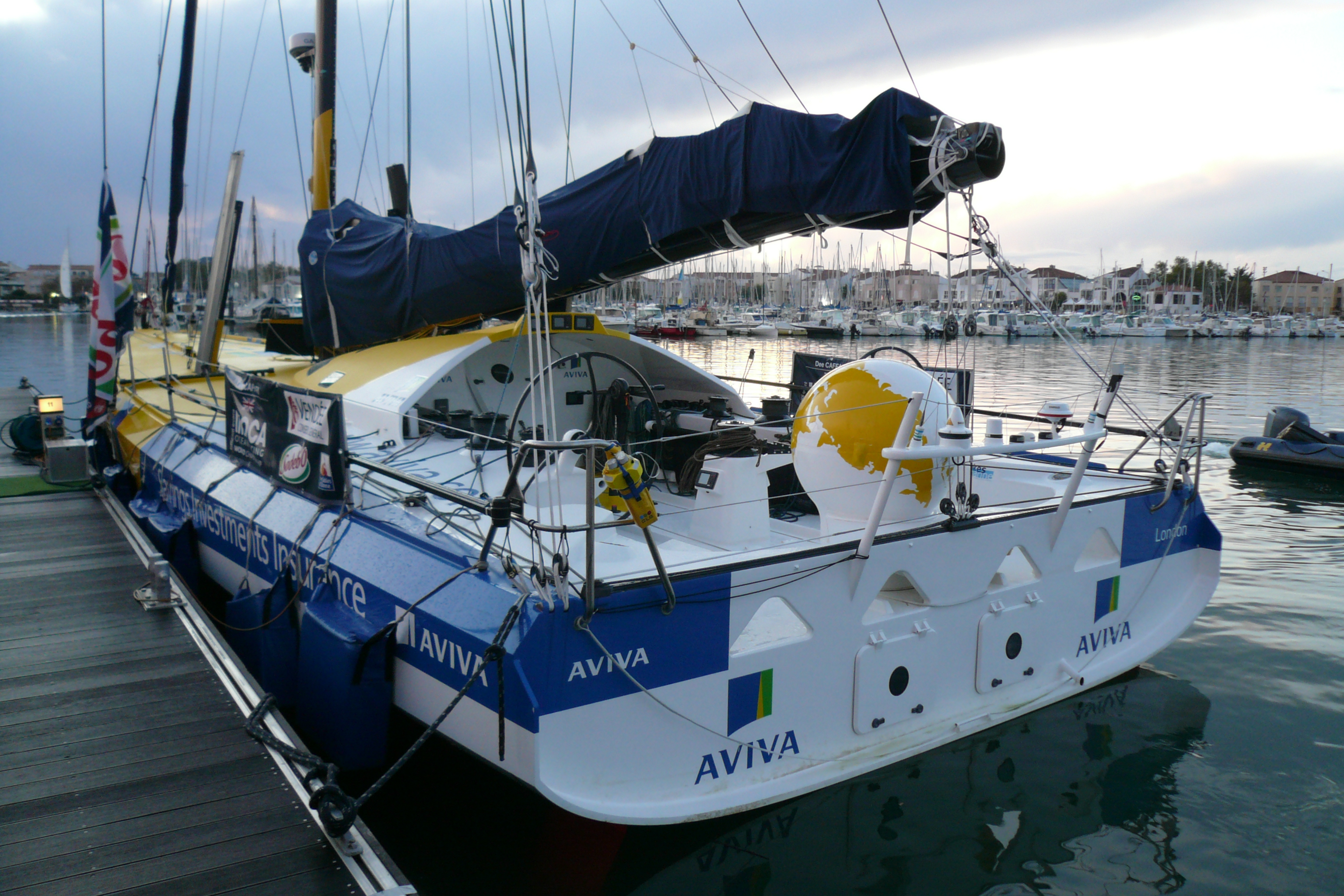

Development
- Designer: Owen Clarke Design, Allen Clarke, Mervyn Owen, Clay Oliver
- Year: 14 December 2007
- Builder: Hakes Marine (NZL)

Hull appendages
- Keel: Canting Keel
- Rudder: Twin Rudders

Racing
- Class association: IMOCA 60

The IMOCA 60-class yacht Aviva was designed by Owen Clark Design and launched in September 2006 after being made by Hakes Marine based in New Zealand. The boat is a sistership to the Ecover 3. Note during the run up the original Group 4 was branded as Aviva "111" and used for initial training events while this boat was in build.

== Names and ownership ==
Aviva (2007-2012)

- Skipper: Dee Caffari

Ariel II (2018-2019)

- Skipper: Ari Huusela

Stark (2020-2021)

- Skipper: Ari Huusela

Szabi Racing (2022)

- Skipper: Weöres Szabolcs

New Europe (since 2023)

- Skipper: Weöres Szabolcs
- Sail no.: HUN 23

== Racing results ==
Pos	Year	Race	Class	Boat name	Skipper	Notes	Ref
Round the world races
DNF / 40	2021	2024–2025 Vendée Globe	IMOCA 60	New Europe	Szabolcs Weöres (HUN)		
25 / 33	2021	2020–2021 Vendée Globe	IMOCA 60	Stark, FIN 222	Ari Huusela (FIN)	116d 18h 15m	
6 / 14	2009	Barcelona World Race	IMOCA 60	GAES Centros Auditivos, ESP 222	Dee Caffari (GBR); Anna Corbella (ESP)	102d 19h 17m	
6 / 30	2009	2008–2009 Vendée Globe	IMOCA 60	Aviva, GBR 222	Dee Caffari (GBR)	99j01h11	
Transatlantic Races
Other Races
