= IMOCA 60 Somewhere 2 =

Sailboat

Development
- Designer: Finot-Conq, Group Finot
- Year: July 1998
- Builder: JMV Industries

Racing
- Class association: IMOCA 60

The IMOCA 60 class yacht Somewhere 2 was designed by Finot-Conq and launched in July 1998 after being made by JMV in Cherbourg in France.

== Racing results ==
Pos	Year	Race	Class	Boat name	Skipper	Notes	Ref
Round the world races
8 / 20	2005	2004–2005 Vendée Globe	IMOCA 60	ARCELOR DUNKERQUE	Joe Seeten (FRA)	104d 23h 02m	.
4 / 24	2001	2000–2001 Vendée Globe	IMOCA 60	Active Wear	Marc Thiercelin (FRA)	102d 20h 37m	
2	1998	1998 The Around Alone	IMOCA 60	Somewhere 2	Marc Thiercelin (FRA)		
Transatlantic Races
9 / 12	2005	Transat Jacques Vabre	IMOCA 60	MER VERTICALE	Cecilia Carreri (FRA); Joe Seeten (FRA)	17d 16h	
8 / 17	2003	Transat Jacques Vabre	IMOCA 60	ARCELOR DUNKERQUE	Eric Dumony (FRA); Joe Seeten (FRA)	18d 08h 25m	
10 / 13	2001	Transat Jacques Vabre	IMOCA 60	SOLLAC ATLANTIQUE	Eric Drouglazet (FRA); Joe Seeten (FRA)	18d 08h 25m	
5	1999	Transat Jacques Vabre	IMOCA 60	SOMEWHERE - BAUME & MERCIER	Bernard MALLARET (FRA); Marc THIERCELIN (FRA)		
Other Races
