= 2010 Extreme Sailing Series =

Event title
- Edition: 4th
- Dates: 27 May–12 October 2010
- Yachts: Extreme 40

Results
- Winner: (Oman) The Wave, Muscat

The 2010 Extreme Sailing Series is the fourth edition of the sailing series. This is the first year without iShares as a sponsor. The 2010 series started in Sète, France on 27 May 2010 and ended in Almeria, Spain on 12 October 2010 and took place in 5 cities.

== Acts ==
Ports visited

=== Act 1: Sète, France ===
The first act of the series was held in Sète, France between 27 and 30 May 2010.

=== Act 2: Cowes, UK ===
The second act of the series was held again in Cowes, UK again. The birthplace to the America's Cup, this act was held during Cowes Week between 31 July and 5 August 2010.

=== Act 3: Kiel, Germany ===
Kiel, Germany was the host of the third act of the 2010 series, on the weekend of 26–29 August 2010.

=== Act 4: Trapani, Italy ===
The fourth act of 2010 was in Trapani, Italy and was held on the weekend of 23–26 September 2010.

=== Act 5: Almeria, Spain ===
Almeria, Spain was the fifth and final act for the series, and was held on 9–12 October 2010.

Team New Zealand entered a wildcard team into this regatta, finishing last. The crew was Dean Barker, Winston Macfarlane, Jeremy Lomas, James Dagg and Darren Bundock.

== Teams ==
Team	Crew	
Team	Position	Name
(Oman) The Wave, Muscat	Skipper/Helmsman: Tactician: Trimmer/Bowman: Bowman:	(United Kingdom) Paul Campbell-James (United Kingdom) Alister Richardson (United Kingdom) Nick Hutton (Oman) Khamis Al Bouri
(France) Groupe Edmond de Rothschild	Skipper: Trimmer: Tactician/Trimmer: Bowman:	(France) Yann Guichard (France) Hervé Cunningham (France) Pierre Pennec (France) Nicolas Heintz
(United Kingdom) Ecover Sailing Team	Skipper/Trimmer: Helmsman: Tactician/Trimmer: Bowman:	(United Kingdom) Mike Golding (United Kingdom) Leigh McMillan (United Kingdom) Will Howden (United Kingdom) Jonathan Taylor
Oman Sail Masirah	Skipper: Tactician: Trimmer: Bowman:	(France) Loïck Peyron (United Kingdom) Mark Bulkeley (United Kingdom) Pete Cumming (United Kingdom) David Carr
(France) Groupama 40	Skipper: Tactician: Trimmer: Trimmer: Bowman:	(France) Franck Cammas (France) Tanguy Cariou (France) Devan Le Bihan (France) Benoit Briand (France) Christophe Espagnon
(Austria) Red Bull Sailing Team	Skipper/Helmsman: Tactician: Trimmer: Bowman:	(Austria) Roman Hagara (Austria) Hans-Peter Steinacher (Italy) Gabriele Olivo (Spain) David Vera
(Slovenia) The Ocean Racing Club	Skipper/Helmsman: Tactician: Trimmer: Bowman:	(Australia) Mitch Booth (Netherlands) Pim Neuwenhuis (Netherlands) Sander Speet (Netherlands) Ed Van Lierde
(United Kingdom) Team GAC Pindar	Skipper: Helmsman: Tactician: Bowman:	(Australia) Nick Moloney (United Kingdom) Andrew Walsh (Australia) Fraser Brown (United Kingdom) Olly Smith

== Results ==
Rank	Team	Act 1	Act 2	Act 3	Act 4	Act 5	Overall points
1	(Oman) The Wave, Muscat	6	8	6	8	8	36
2	(France) Groupe Edmond de Rothschild	8	6	8	5	7	34
3	(United Kingdom) Ecover Sailing Team	5	7	7	6	6 *	31
4	Oman Sail Masirah	7	5	5	7	5	29
5	(France) Groupama 40	4	3	2	4	4	17
6	(Austria) Red Bull Sailing Team	3	4	3	3	3	16
7	(Slovenia) The Ocean Racing Club	2	1	4	-	-	7
8	(United Kingdom) Team GAC Pindar	1	2	-	-	-	3

* Average points awarded
