= Ecover =

Belgian cleaning product manufacturer

- Type: Private
- Industry: Consumer products
- Founded: 1979
- Headquarters: Malle, Belgium
- Key people: Managing Director: Philip Malmberg
- Products: Cleaning products
- Parent: S. C. Johnson & Son
- Website: www.ecover.com

Ecover is an American-owned Belgian company that manufactures ecologically sound cleaning products (made from plant-based and mineral ingredients), owned by S. C. Johnson & Son since 2017.

== History ==
The company was founded in 1979 by Frans Bogaerts to create phosphate-free cleaning products to reduce the environmental impact of cleaning agents. Following expansion to support sales through supermarkets, it ran into financial difficulties during the early 1990s. The business was sold to Bogaerts' son with guidance from Gunter Pauli, a member of the company's board since 1990. Pauli, in turn, enlisted in 1992 the financial clout of now-deceased Danish investor, Jørgen Philip-Sørensen, through the private investment company Skagen. The company's relaunch commenced with the construction of an "ecological factory", followed by investments into research projects for the purpose of developing appropriate plant-based and renewable raw materials for cleaning products.

Ecover is part of the Skagen Conscience Capital, a global organisation. Aquaver and the Change Initiatives are other companies of Skagen Conscience Capital.

In 2012 Ecover bought Method Products, a San Francisco, United States, headquartered manufacturer of biodegradable natural cleaning supplies with a focus on minimalist product design, to assist its entry of the North American market. The new group had annual revenues of $200 million at that time and were the world's largest green cleaning products company by sales. Method had been founded in 2001 by Eric Ryan, a designer and marketer, and Adam Lowry, a chemical engineer. Method opened a factory in the Pullman neighborhood of Chicago in 2015.

In 2017, S. C. Johnson & Son purchased the Ecover and Method brands on undisclosed terms.

== Products ==
A number of Ecover products - washing up detergent (domestic and professional), fabric conditioner, laundry detergent and multi-surface cleaner - are available from a container refill service (customers reuse the product's original container) to reduce the overall environmental impact of distributing the product. Ecover refill locations have previously been limited to independent health food stores and small local cooperative schemes, with the company having stated that it will expand its reach in this regard.

== Factories ==
Ecover built the world's first "ecological factory" in Malle, Belgium, with a green roof extending over more than 6,000 m^{2} (65,000 sq ft). The factory opened in 1992 and was featured on television news programs that allowed the company to feature the recycled and recyclable materials that make up most of the structure. In 2007, Ecover opened another factory based on the same "ecological" premise in Boulogne-sur-Mer, Northern France, and also secured ownership of a factory in Steffisburg, Switzerland, through the acquisition of the private Held AG company (manufacturer and distributor of ecological washing agents) in 2003.

== Awards ==
In 1993, UNEP awarded the "Global 500 Roll of Honour" to Ecover for "outstanding achievements in the protection and improvement of the environment". In 2008, Time magazine honored Ecover CEO, Mick Bremans, with the title Hero of the Environment together with 29 other eco-pioneers working for a green future. In 2010, Ecover earned a finalist nomination from the European Business Awards for the Environment for a pioneering project in green innovation in the process category. In 2018, Method was recognized as one of "the 50 most sustainable companies in the world" at the SEAL Business Sustainability Awards. For the company's national and international experience in sustainable development, and eco-friendly products, the A.A. Environment Possibility Award conferred the "Award of Green-Trend Leader" to Ecover in 2020.

== Controversy ==
In 2007, the Vegan Society withdrew their Vegan Trademark registration from Ecover products due to the company's use of daphnia (water fleas) to test the effects of its products on aquatic life, plus rabbit blood to test stain removal. Daphnia are not vertebrates and therefore are not classified as "animals" according to EU animal-testing rules. However, the Vegan Society's definition incorporates the entire animal kingdom, which is inclusive of invertebrates, as part of its Vegan Trademark registration criteria. Ecover continues to use the Daphtox acute toxicity test that observes daphnia behaviour to calculate the EC50 values of their products, so it can assess the environmental quality of its products.

In 2010, a Which? study of 14 household products, including laundry tablets, toilet cleaners and nappies, reported that Ecover was among a number of companies where each was believed to have exaggerated at least one "green claim" or was not proven by the manufacturer's evidence. The panel of experts found, for instance, no convincing evidence to show the chemicals found in standard toilet cleaner and market-leading laundry tablets would have a significantly worse impact on aquatic life than their "eco" equals. Which? said: "When companies make clear green claims it helps consumers make eco choices with confidence. But our experts concluded that many of the companies did not provide enough evidence to back up their claims and thought that some were exaggerated. This makes it hard for people to choose." Ecover responded several days later.

Ecover had previously been criticized for not subscribing to the British Union for the Abolition of Vivisection's "Humane Household Products Standard", which requires a "fixed cut-off date" on animal-tested ingredients. Ecover stated that "a fixed cut-off date [means] that we wouldn't be able to improve our products on what we have today. We do not believe that it is necessary to carry the 'Humane Household Products Standard' to uphold our core values of transparency, honesty and integrity." However, in October 2012 Ecover's products were certified into the Cruelty Free International (formerly BUAV) "The Leaping Bunny Program" and awarded the internationally-recognised Leaping Bunny logo for products certified free from animal testing and which comply with the comprehensive criteria of the Humane Household Products Standard. Ecover CEO Philip Malmberg said "Being accepted into this program is an absolute privilege for Ecover and a great way to show the world that we care. Ecover has been animal friendly since the day it was founded in 1979. The decision to align with Leaping Bunny and provide our customers with household cleaning and laundry products that are certified as safe and cruelty-free was an obvious next step."

In 2014, Ecover confirmed that it was trialling oil derived from algae. In response, 23 environmental, consumer and farmers groups called on Ecover to drop the algae. Some of the groups launched a petition and web site, declaring that "Synthetic is not Natural", in reference to Ecover's marketing, which relies heavily on words like "natural" and "eco-friendly". The petition collected thousands of signatures calling on Ecover to stop using synthetic algae, citing a lack of regulation and knowledge about synthetic organisms, and effects on farmers. Ecover claimed that the algal oil it is using employs the natural mutation process of algae and standard industrial fermentation and would be less destructive than the palm kernel oil it currently uses, a claim disputed by some of the opposing groups because the algae was fed sugarcane which is also associated with biodiversity destruction.

Due to the open refusal of owner SC Johnson to abandon its use of animal testing, the Naturewatch Foundation revoked Ecover and Method's Compassionate Shopping Guide accreditations.

In January 2021 the company issued a product recall on its Ecover Zero % Non-Bio Laundry Liquid, as it had been discovered that the liquid contained hazardous levels of potassium hydroxide.

== Sponsorship ==
Ecover sponsored yachtsman Mike Golding. Golding skippered the Ecover Sailing Team in the 2009 iShares cup, a selection of races all over Europe, sailing catamarans in competitive races against world-leaders in the sport. The races took place in Venice, Hyères, Cowes, Kiel, Amsterdam and Almeria.
