= Global Challenge =

Round the world yacht race

The Global Challenge (not to be confused with Global Challenge Award) was an around the world yacht race run by Challenge Business, the company started by Sir Chay Blyth in 1989. It was held every four years and took a fleet of one-design steel yachts, crewed by men and women who had paid to take part, round Cape Horn and through the Southern Ocean where winds can reach 70 kn (130 km/h). The fee for the last race proposed (in 2008) was £28,750. It was unique in that the race took the westabout route worldwide against prevailing winds and currents, often referred to as the ‘wrong way’ route.

The race's route covered a distance of some 29,000 nmi (54,000 km). It changed to accommodate different ports of call, but in 2004/5, it started from Portsmouth (UK) and stopped at Buenos Aires (ARG), Wellington (NZ), Sydney (AUS), Cape Town (SA), Boston (USA), and La Rochelle (FRA) before returning again to Portsmouth.

The event claimed the motto “The World’s Toughest Yacht Race” and was the ultimate sailing challenge for amateur sailors. The official charity for the races was Save the Children, and the race patron was The Princess Royal.

After failing to secure a title sponsor, the company went into administration on 9 October 2006, appointing Grant Thornton as administrators and placing the future of the race in doubt. The fleet was then put up for sale.

== Background ==
The seeds of the race were sown in Blyth's previous sailing exploits. In 1970/71, he became the first person to sail alone round the world westabout in the yacht British Steel. The practicality of training people who had never sailed before was demonstrated during the 1973/74 Whitbread Around the World race, when Blyth had raced Great Britain II with a crew from the Parachute Regiment. Subsequently, he ran charters for paying crew.

Blyth's longtime associate, Andrew Roberts, forged the design philosophy for the identical yachts used on the Global Challenge races. His idea was to start from the largest top-action production winch available, which would dictate sail area, displacement and size. He also oversaw the build of the two fleets of steel cutters used in the four races to date, to designs by David Thomas and Thanos Condylis (Challenge 67) and Rob Humphreys (Challenge 72).

== British Steel Challenge 1992/3 ==
The first race started in Southampton in September 1992, with 10 identical 67 ft (20 m) boats sailed by a skipper and 13 crew. There were a number of serious rigging screw failures in the Southern Ocean and British Steel II, after the initial success of winning the first leg of the race, was dismasted in mid-Southern Ocean. However, she managed to motor sail safely to Hobart under jury rig. She was re-rigged in time to rejoin the race for the next leg to Cape Town.

The first race winner was John Chittenden and crew in Nuclear Electric. Chittenden went on to win the 2001 Yachtsman of the Year Award.

Overall place	Yacht name	Skipper	Combined elapsed time
1	Nuclear Electric CB 27	John Chittenden	151d 11h 49m 11s
2	Group 4 CB 22	Mike Golding	151d 13h 59m 36s
3	Hofbräu Lager CB 26	Pete Goss	152d 15h 45m 56s
4	Coopers & Lybrand CB 21	Vivien Cherry	154d 17h 59m 56s
5	Pride of Teesside	Ian MacGillivray	155d 16h 06m 48s
6	Interspray	Paul Jeffes	156d 14h 09m 10s
7	Heath Insured	Adrian Donovan	157d 10h 29m 18s
8	Rhône-Poulenc	John O'Driscoll, Peter Phillips	159d 04h 07m 22s
9	Commercial Union	Will Sutherland, Richard Merriweather	159d 17h 26m 13s
10	British Steel II	Richard Tudor	163d 00h 25m 07s

== BT Global Challenge 1996/7 ==
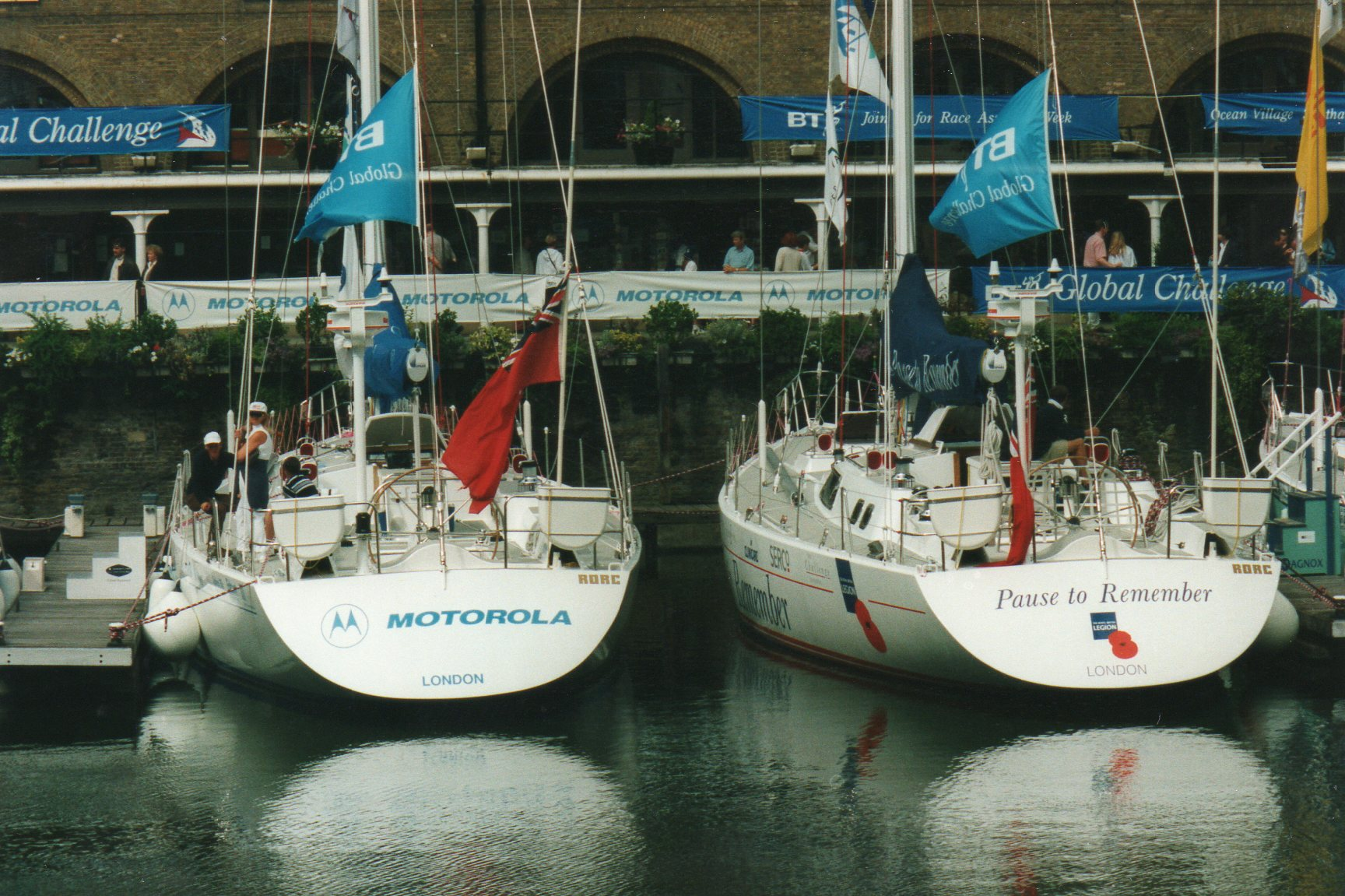
Two of the yachts in St Katharine Docks, London, before the start of the race.

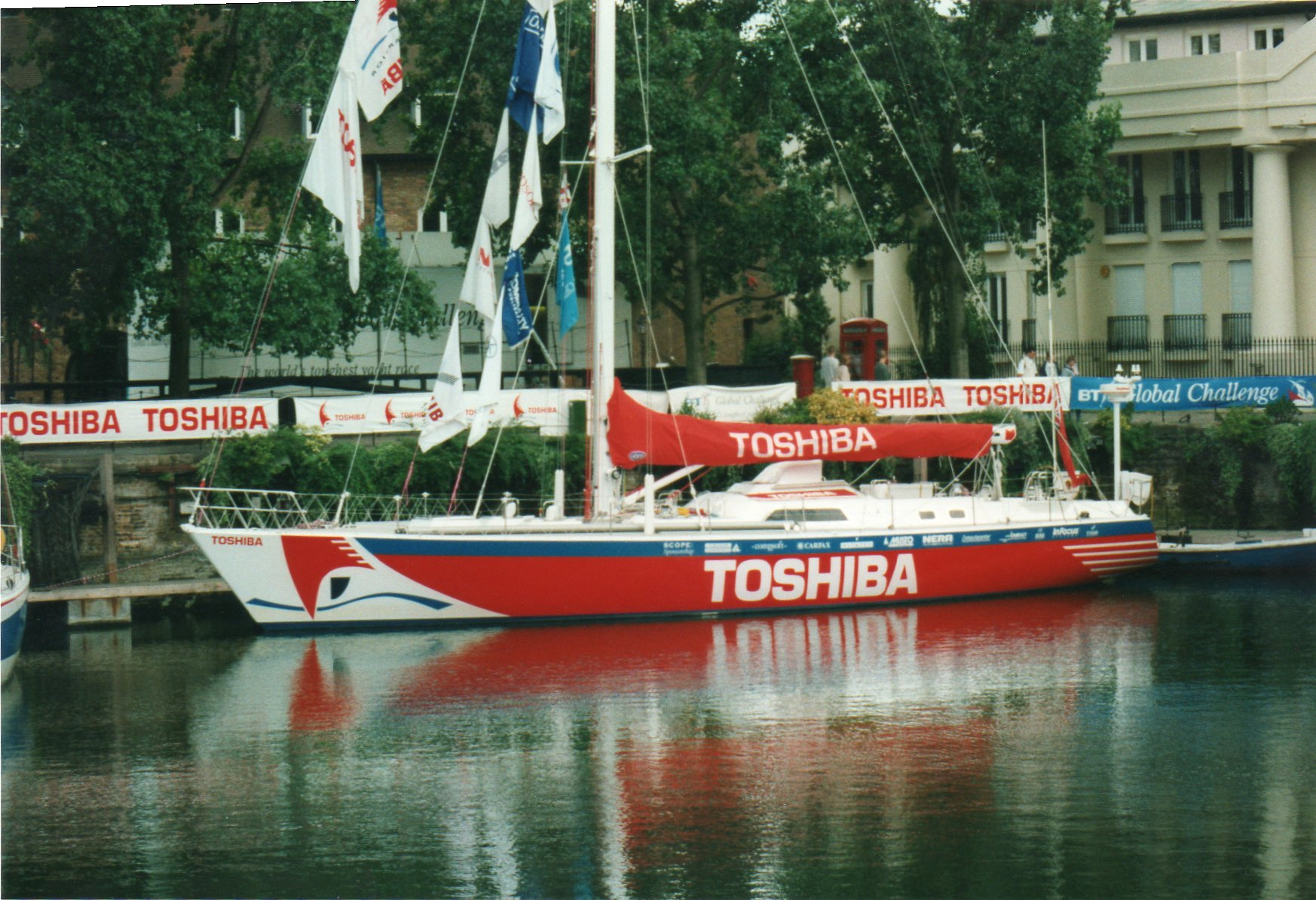
Toshiba in St Katharine Docks

An expanded fleet of 14 Challenge 67 yachts set out from Southampton in driving rain and gales. Again, rigging problems struck in the Southern Ocean, and Concert was dismasted. Skipper Chris Tibbs and crew made a jury rig and motor sailed to Wellington, New Zealand. Concert was re-rigged in time to start leg 3 from Wellington to Sydney and was 2nd on the Sydney to Cape Town leg. Yacht Pause to Remember, skippered by Tom O'Connor, suffered a snapped boom halfway between Sydney and Cape Town. There seemed no choice but to fly their trysail until crewmembers Graham Phelp and Matthew Reeves took on the challenge of trying to repair it by using a cut out section as a splint. Two days later, a shortened boom emerged from below decks and was successfully attached to the mast. Three weeks later, having suffered several storms with wind over 50 kn (93 km/h), Pause to Remember sailed into Cape Town, with the boom still intact.

This race featured an extra leg to Boston, and a crew of disabled men and women took part on “Time & Tide,” the first to sail around the world.

Mike Golding dominated, winning five out of six legs in Group 4 with Andy Hindley winning the remaining leg in Save the Children. Three skippers had graduated from being crew volunteers four years earlier: Andy Hindley; Mark Lodge; and Simon Walker, all of whom appeared in the top five placings. Simon Walker went on to become Managing Director of Challenge Business, helping to organise the 2000/1 and 2004/5 Global Challenges.

Overall place	Yacht name	Skipper	Combined elapsed time
1	Group 4 - CB 22	Mike Golding	161d 05h 25m 18s
2	Toshiba - CB 26	Simon Walker	163d 11h 14m 34s
3	Save the Children - CB 29	Andy Hindley	165d 20h 50m 46s
4	Motorola - CB 31	Mark Lodge	165d 22h 40m 54s
5	Commercial Union - CB 34	Richard Merriweather	167d 08h 01m 32s
6	Global Teamwork - CB 21	Merfyn Owen	169d 20h 27m 56s
7	Nuclear Electric CB 27	Richard Tudor	171d 01h 29m 10s
8	Ocean Rover - CB 30	Paul Bennett	171d 11h 46m 34s
9	3Com - CB 24	David Tomkinson	171d 11h 57m 30s
10	Pause to Remember - CB 23	Tom O’Connor	172d 19h 13m 28s
11	Courtaulds International - CB 35	Boris Webber	173d 19h 26m 12s
12	Heath Insured - CB 33	Adrian Donovan	174d 21h 36m 29s
13	Concert - CB 28	Chris Tibbs	174d 21h 36m 29s
14	Time & Tide - CB 32	James Hatfield	176d 18h 09m 55s

== BT Global Challenge 2000/1 ==
On 10 September, a new fleet of 72 ft (22 m) steel cutters debuted in this race. The winner, Conrad Humphreys and crew on LG Flatron, won four of the seven legs.

For the first time, the race was scored on points, with equal points for each leg, though combined elapsed times are shown here for comparison.

Overall place	Yacht name	Skipper	Points	Combined elapsed time
1	LG Flatron	Conrad Humphreys	95	171d 13h 33m 49s
2	Compaq	Will Oxley	86	173d 14h 59m 43s
3	BP	Mark Denton	78	175d 09h 54m 33s
4	Logica	Jeremy Troughton	71	175d 20h 46m 04s
5	TeamSpirIT	Andy Dare, John Read	68	176d 22h 34m 43s
6=	Spirit of Hong Kong	Stephen Wilkins	62	178d 21h 34m 43s
6=	Quadstone	Alex Phillips, Richard Chenery	64*	179d 11h 58m 14s
7	Norwich Union	Neil Murray	60	180d 07h 58m 14s
8	Isle of Man	Lin Parker	58	180d 21h 41m 18s
9	Veritas	Will Carnegie	56	
10	Save the Children	Nick Fenton	56*	176d
10	Olympic	Manley Hopkinson	37*	183d

* These teams did not finish all legs, a requirement for a position in the overall standings, but their positions are shown without displacing any other team

Catherine Middleton, who married Prince William to become the Duchess of Cambridge and Princess of Wales, worked as a corporate crew during the buildup of the 2000/1 race.

== Global Challenge 2004/5 ==
The same fleet of 72 ft (22 m) yachts sailed again in the 2004 race, and the winner was the Australian skipper Andy Forbes and his crew on BG SPIRIT, who won three of the seven legs. Once again, although the overall safety record of the race was very good, medical emergencies did unfold, most notably onboard the yacht 'Imagine It. Done.' 'Team Stelmar' (with TWO separate medical evacuations), and 'Save The Children'. In the case of 'Imagine It. Done.' Only an extraordinary, combined effort of several yachts within the fleet, the doctor onboard (Dr Roche), and the efforts of the Westpac Rescue team saved the life of John Masters. 'Team Stelmar' suffered both their medical evacuations in the Southern Oceans on the BA – Wellington leg, costing them a 2,500-nautical-mile (4,600 km) detour and 17 more days at sea, making the leg 9,700 nautical miles (18,000 km) instead of 6,100 nmi (11,300 km) and 52 days at sea. They carried on with 3 crew down crossing the Southern Ocean alone, set the 24-hour record for that leg and finished 11th due to the retirement of 'Imagine It. Done.' Team Stelmar later set the overall 24-hour race record during the penultimate leg of the race between Boston and La Rochelle.

Overall place	Yacht name	Skipper	Points	Combined elapsed time
1	BG Spirit	Andy Forbes	90	166d 00h 50m 36s
2	Barclays Adventurer	Stuart Jackson	76	168d 09h 39m 09s
3	BP Explorer	David Melville	74	167d 13h 16m 25s
4	Spirit of Sark	Duggie Gillespie	73	166d 19h 15m 25s
5	SAIC La Jolla	Eero Lehtinen	71	168d 20h 09m 51s
6	Team Stelmar	Clive Cosby	66	184d 15h 04m 11s
7=	Me To You	James Allen	63	170d 16h 07m 02s
7=	VAIO	Amedeo Sorrentino	63	170d 11h 31m 10s
9	Samsung	Matt Riddell	58**	170d 06h 13m 10s
10	Imagine it. Done	Dee Caffari	56*	168d 23h 31m 26s
11	Pindar	Loz Marriott	54	174d 01h 11m 59s
12	Save the Children	Paul Kelly	41**	176d 03h 37m 23s

* Retired from leg 2 from Buenos Aires to Wellington (NZ) after a medical emergency on board.

** Stopped racing during leg 2 from Buenos Aires to Wellington (NZ) to render aid after a medical emergency on board the Imagine It. Done.

== Specifications of the Challenge 72 one-design ==
The current 12-strong race fleet of Challenge 72-footers was developed from the Challenge 67s and was specifically designed to be strong, safe and seaworthy in even the worst conditions and to be self-sufficient for long periods at sea, with enough fuel and water to take their crews safely to a distant port. The yachts were also designed to be relatively easy to sail and handled by unprofessional crews. The yachts have a snake pit, an unusual feature that allows anyone working the halyards to 'hunker down' and shelter in strong wind and rain, and, more importantly, from waves washing over the deck. Designed by Rob Humphreys, the identical 72-foot (22 m) steel ocean racing yachts were built by Devonport Yachts in the UK by a new method using a unique flat-pack yacht assembly kit of precision cut laser steel panels.

Challenge 72 Specifications
Hull type	Monohull
Builder	Ten of the twelve yachts were built by Devonport, UK, the other two by Kim's Yacht Company in China.
Displacement (half load)	40 tonnes
Draught full load	10 ft (3.05m)
Ballast	12.5 tonnes
Designer	Rob Humphreys
Length overall	72 ft (22 m)
Length waterline	61 ft (19 m)
Air draught	95 ft (29 m)
Hull	50A mild steel
Deck	Stainless steel
Sail area (windward)	2,825 sq ft (262.5 m^{2})
Sail area (downwind)	4,020 sq ft (373 m^{2})
Water capacity	390 gal (1,775 lt)
Fuel capacity	475 gal (2,150 lt)

== Buyers of the yachts after the demise of Challenge Business ==
=== Challenge 72 fleet ===
Challenge 72 fleet
Hull number	2000/01 Race name	2004/05 Race name	New name	Call sign	MMSI	Owner / operator	Sailing area	Notes
CB 36	Prototype	Prototype	CatZero	MYAJ4	232424000	Cat Zero	Hull	
CB 37	Save the Children	Barclays Adventurer	Sea Dragon	ZCYV6	319011400	Pangaea Exploration	USA	Adventure sailing and research charters in the Pacific
CB 38	Isle of Man	Spirit of Sark	Challenger 1 / Oona	ZQCM5	235006000	Tall Ships Youth Trust	UK	
CB 39	BP Explorer	BP Explorer	Challenger 2 / William.PG	ZQCM6	235007000	Tall Ships Youth Trust	UK	
CB 40	TeamSpirIT	Aviva (Imagine it. Done)	HMSTC ADVENTURE	ZQCM8	235008000	Joint Services, Ministry of Defence	UK	Undertook a circumnavigation 2015–16: Ex Transglobe.
CB 41	LG Flatron	Samsung	Alba Explorer	2ISY4	235009000	Ocean Youth Trust Scotland	Scotland	
CB 42	Spirit of Hong Kong	Pindar	Challenger 4 / Margherita	ZQCN2	235010000	Tall Ships Youth Trust	UK	
CB 43	VERITAS	Stelmar	HMSTC Discoverer	ZQCN6	235011000	Joint Services, Ministry of Defence	UK	
CB 44	Compaq	SAIC La Jolla	La Jolla	DEVO	211255010	Private	Germany	For Sale Apr 08
CB 45	Logica	BG Spirit	BIG Spirit	ZQCN8	235013000	Exeter Fabrication Ltd	UK	Yacht Written Off and undergoing repairs to MCA Cat 0 under survey by MECAL and offered for sale.
CB 46	Norwich Union	Save the Children	Challenger 3 / Sarah	ZQCN9	235014000	Tall Ships Youth Trust	UK	
CB 47	Olympic Group	Spencers Dock (Vaio)	Challenger 5 (formerly Challenge Wales / Her Cymru)	ZQC02	235015000	Tall Ships Youth Trust	UK	Transferred into the ownership of the Tall Ships Youth Trust.
CB 48	Quadstone	Me to you	Ironbarque	ZQCO4	235016000	OM Adventures	Worldwide	

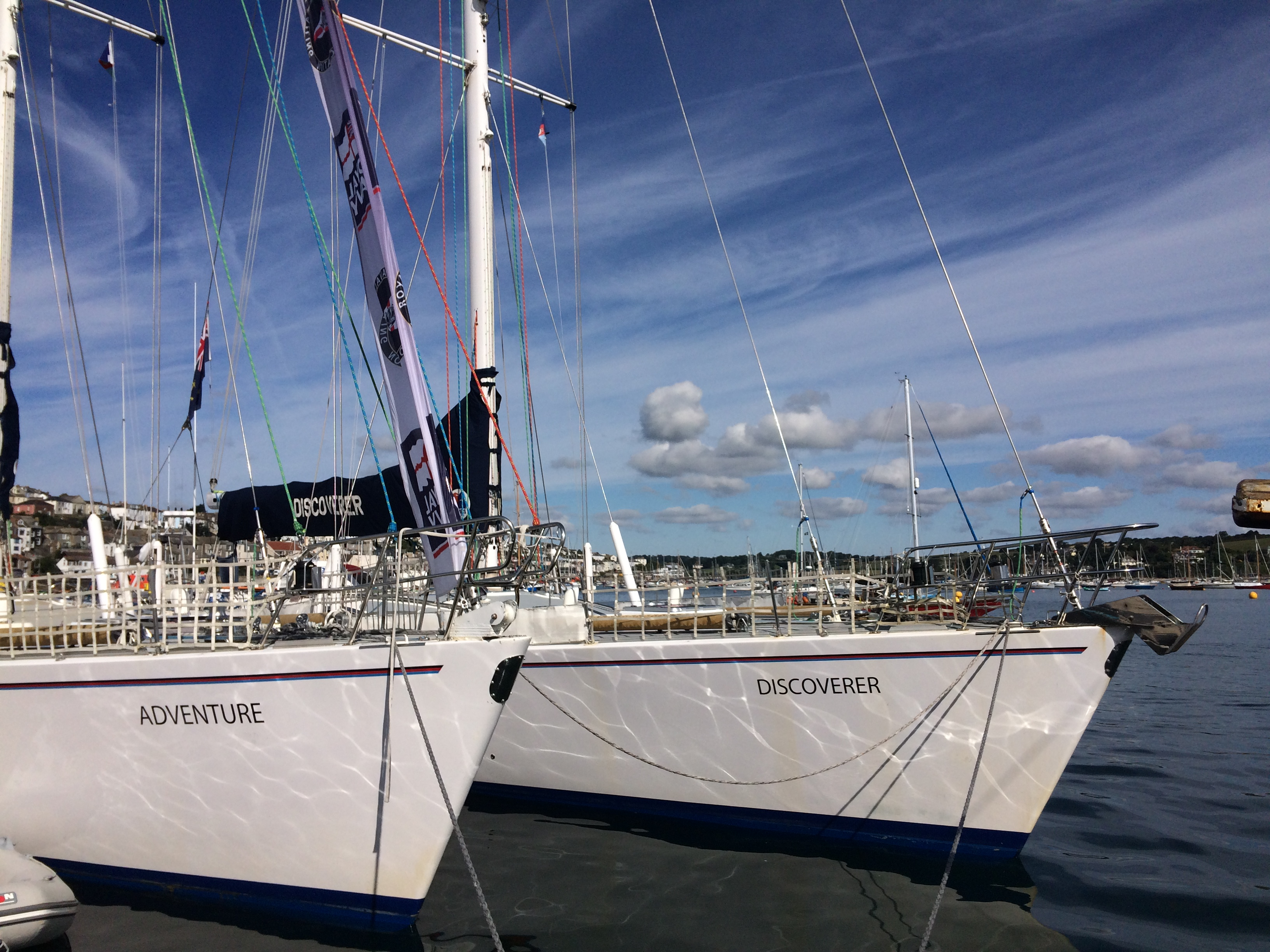
Adventure and Discoverer: two Challenge 72 yachts alongside in Falmouth, UK, after the transatlantic crossing from Halifax, Nova Scotia; August 2016.

=== Challenge 67 fleet ===
Challenge 67 fleet
Hull number	Original name	New name	Call sign	MMSI	Owner / operator	Sailing area	Notes
CB 22	Group 4	Ecover of Skagen		233033000		Mallorca	Available for charter
CB 32	Time and Tide	Elinca		232025887	Sea Benefit Ltd.	Netherlands	http://www.seabenefit.eu
CB 29	Save the Children	Aurora	MPWB2	235006450		OceanVillage Southampton U.K.	
CB 28	Concert	Spirit of Outward Bound Hong Kong	VRZR3	477840100	Outward Bound Hong Kong	Hong Kong	
4	Albatross	Albatros		228030900	Challenge Ocean	France	
5	Whirlwind	Whirlwind		228029600	Challenge Ocean	France	
CB 26	Hofbrau / Toshiba	Hrimfare		235012010	Hrimfare.com	Sweden	Sailing4science expeditions
CB 35	Courtaulds International	MariFlex Challenge	PA3426	244780659			Currently in Dutch hands after a major refit at Berthon Shipyard
CB 33	Heath Insured	Nashachata II	MWSG-2	234171000		Longyearbyen, Norway	
9	Oceans of Hope		OWBG	220092000	Sailing Sclerosis Foundation	Global	currently completing round the world trip
CB 21	Coopers & Lybrand	Yam Reed			Mifrasim- The Social Boat	Israel	https://www.mifrasim.org.il/?lang=en
CB 20	(prototype)	2041					For sale in 2013
