= Dee Caffari =

British sailor (born 1973)

Dee Caffari MBE
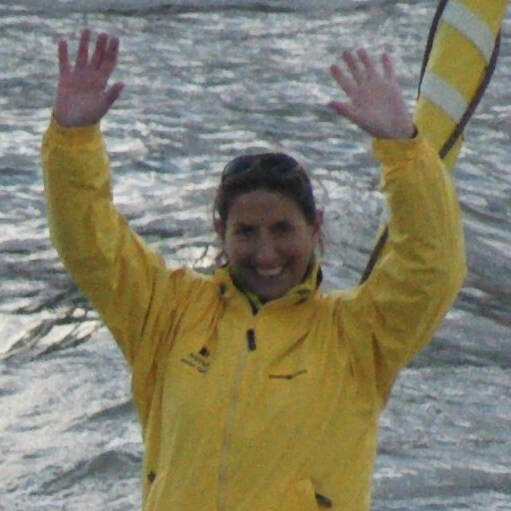
- in 2009

Personal information
- Full name: Denise Caffari
- Born: 23 January 1973 (age 53) Rute (Córdoba)

Denise "Dee" Caffari MBE (born 23 January 1973) is a British sailor, and in 2006 became the first woman to sail single-handedly and non-stop around the world "the wrong way"; westward against the prevailing winds and currents. In February 2009, Caffari completed the Vendée Globe race and set a new record to become the first woman to sail solo, non-stop, around the world in both directions.

== Early life ==
Descended from a Maltese sea captain, Caffari grew up in Rickmansworth, Hertfordshire and attended St. Clement Danes School. Caffari studied at Leeds Metropolitan University and became a PE teacher for 5 years before beginning her sailing career.

Caffari trained at UKSA, based in Cowes, Isle of Wight, whilst there she compled her Yachtmaster course and a range of ocean qualifications. Caffari then worked for Formula 1 Sailing, first as a skipper and then as the manager of their fleet of Farr 65s in the UK and the Caribbean.

== Awards and Honors ==
On 2 December 2006, Caffarri was a runner up for BBC South Sports Personality of the Year and won the Tenon Yachtsperson of the Year award.

In the 2007 Birthday Honours, she was appointed a Member of the Order of the British Empire (MBE) for services to sailing.

She was shortlisted in 2011 for the World Sailing – Rolex World Sailing of the Year Award.

Her name is one of those featured on the sculpture Ribbons, unveiled in 2024.

== Sailing career ==
=== Highlight ===
On 26 January 2026, Dee Caffari, co-skipper of The Famous Project, completed a non-stop circumnavigation of the globe with the first all-female crew, finishing the voyage in 57 days, 22 hours and 20 minutes aboard the maxi trimaran IDEC Sport during an attempt on the Jules Verne Trophy.

Pos	Year	Race	Class	Boat name	Notes	Ref
Round the World Races
	2026	Around the world sailing record attempt	Maxi Trimaran	IDEC Sport	First all-female crewed boat, non-stop	
6/7	2018	2017–18 Volvo Ocean Race	Volvo Ocean 65	Turn the Tide on Plastic	Skipper of a youth mixed gender entry	
6/7	2015	2014–15 Volvo Ocean Race	Volvo Ocean 65	Team SCA	Part of the only all female crew in the race	
6/14	2011	Barcelona World Race	IMOCA 60	GAES Centros Auditivos: ESP 222; (formerly Aviva)	with Anna Corbella in 102 days 19 hour 17 min	
7/30	2009	2008–2009 Vendée Globe Race (Solo Non-stop Eastabout)	IMOCA 60	Aviva - GBR 222	99 days 1 hrs 10 min 57 sec	
World; Record	2006	Around the world sailing record (1st Solo Female Non-stop Westabout)	Challenge 72	Aviva	178 days 17hrs 55min 42secs	
10/12	2004	Global Challenge Race	Challenge 72	Imagine it. Done	Skipper of a fully crewed amateur stopping	
Other significant races
	2011	Rolex Fastnet Race	Multihull	MOD 70 – Race for Water	Crew member	
World; Record	2009	Outright non-stop Round Britain and Ireland Record	IMOCA 60	Aviva - GBR 222	6 days 11hrs 30sec	
8/13	2007	The Artemis Transat	IMOCA 60	Aviva - GBR 222	Vendee Qualifier	
	2007	Calais Round Britain Race	IMOCA 60	Aviva - GBR 222	Solo 11 days 1hrs 0 min Vendee Qualifier	
4e/17	2007	Transat Jacques Vabre:	IMOCA 60	Aviva - GBR 111	20d 08h 10m with Nigel KING	
DNF	2007	Transat Ecover B2B Race	IMOCA 60	Aviva - GBR 111	Charter Boat Dismasted	

=== Background ===
Her initial professional sailing career was spent working for both Sir Robin Knox-Johnson and Sir Chay Blyth sailing adventure companies, so her progression into being a round the world sailing pioneer was not a surprise.

Her first round the world voyage came as skipper of Imagine It. Done in the 2004 Global Challenge Round the World Yacht Race. The Global Challenge was an amateur crew who paid to race around the world with a professional skipper in matching Challenge 72 yachts. The only similar race is Clipper Round the Race but the challenge race went against the prevailing wind conditions and traded under the term "The World Toughest Yacht Race" for this reason. Dee managed one serious situation when a crewmember needed to be airlifted off in the Southern Ocean by the New Zealand Rescue Service due to an abdominal infection.

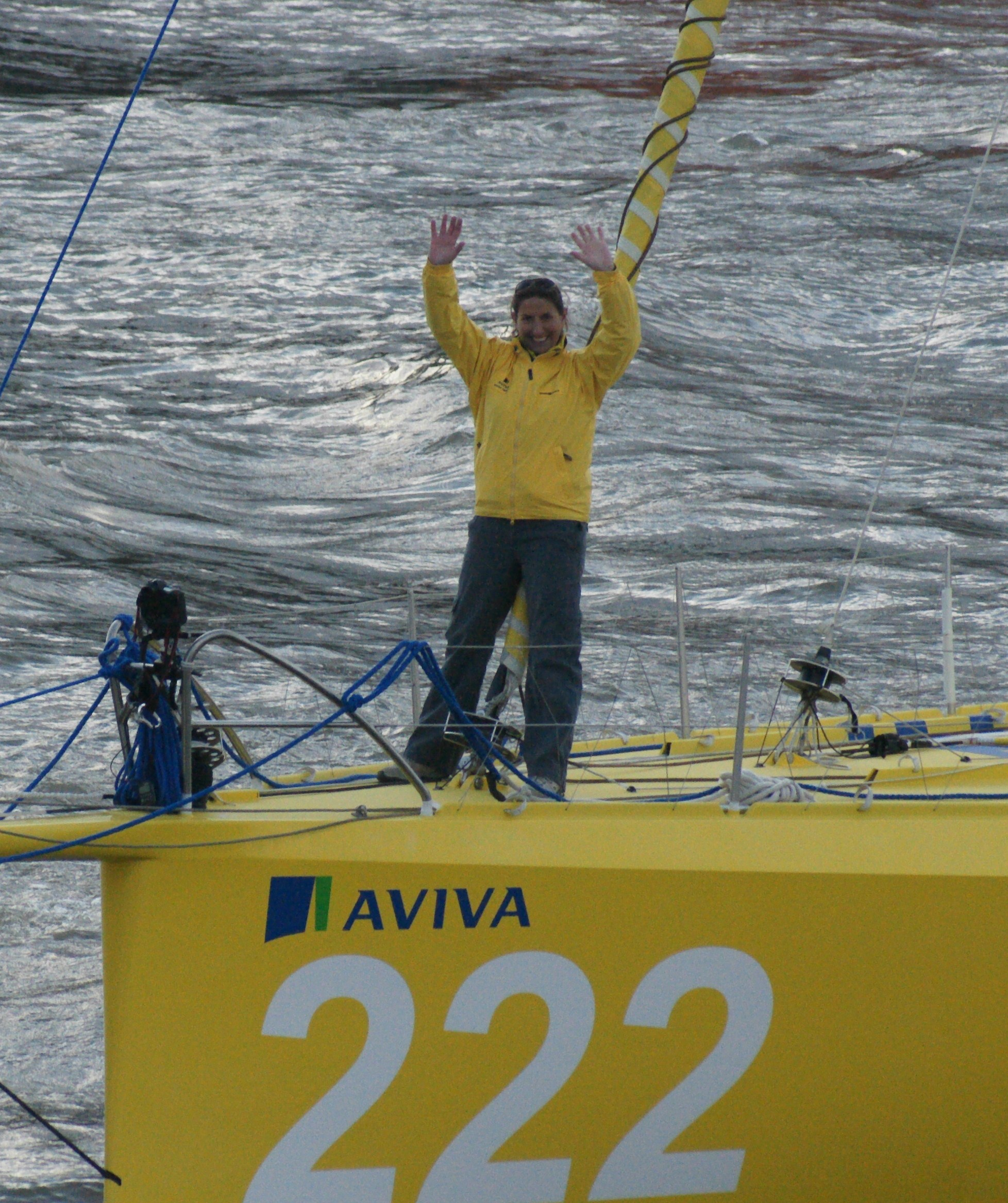
Caffari arrives in London at the end of the Vendée Globe race, 2009

On 20 November 2005, she set off on her attempt to single-handedly circumnavigate the world against the prevailing winds and currents. She finished on 18 May 2006, at 17:55pm, after 178 days at sea. Her voyage was sponsored by Aviva.

In January 2007 Caffari announced that she would be taking part in the 2008/09 – Vendée Globe singlehanded round the world yacht race, again sponsored by Aviva. In March 2007 she announced a technical partnership with Mike Golding to allow both the British entries in the Vendée Globe to work together.

In December 2007 she had to be rescued by Royal Navy frigate HMS Northumberland after dismasting in severe weather off northwest Spain whilst competing singlehanded in the Transat Ecover B2B Race.

In 2011, she and the Catalan sailor Anna Corbella i Jordi, returned from sailing around the world in the Barcelona World Race. Anna Corbella became the first Spaniard to do so and she was to join Dee and Ellen MacArthur as the first three women to sail and circumnavigate the world non-stop twice.

She was a guest skipper on Maiden's global voyage in 2018 in support of The Maiden Factor Foundation.

== Role within the Community ==
Dee Caffari has been an enthusiastic supporter of charities such as Toe in The Water (using competitive sailing to re-inspire injured servicemen), and Sail 4 Cancer.

Between 2011 - 2023 she was the patron of the charity Gosport and Fareham Inshore Rescue Service which is an independent lifeboat station based in Stokes Bay local to where Dee Caffari lives.

In 2012, Caffari was made Honorary Commander RNR in the Royal Navy.

In 2018 she became the first Chair the World Sailing Trust a World Sailing initiative looking at Marine Health, Youth Development and Access.

In 2021 she was BRIT Ambassador championing the BRIT 2021 Challenge a mental health charity.

== Publications ==
In September 2007, Caffari's autobiography Against the Flow was published by Adlard Coles Nautical.

In March 2009, Caffari's autobiography Against the Flow was re-published in paperback with an additional chapter charting the lead up to her Vendee Globe entry and subsequent world record achievement.
