= Pasquale De Gregorio =

Italian offshore sailor and navigator

Personal information
- Nationality: Italian
- Born: 30 April 1941 (age 85) Rosciano, Italy

Sailing career
- Sport: Sailing

Pasquale De Gregorio (born 30 April 1941 in Rosciano) is an Italian professional sailor.

== Biography ==
A law graduate, he was a lawyer at the Bank of Italy for nearly 20 years. At the age of 47, he left his job and career to devote himself entirely to sailing. He finished third overall in the Around World Rally, a crewed round-the-world race, at the equator. In 2000, he placed 4th in Europe 1 NewMan Star in Class 2: 50-foot monohulls.

On April 16, 2001, he finished the 2000-2001 Vendée Globe in fifteenth place and was the last to successfully complete the course on his boat Wind Telecommunicazioni in 158 day 2 hrs 37 min, 65 days after winner Michel Desjoyeaux although he was in an IMOCA 50 not 60 like all other finishers.
