= Mike Golding =

British yacht racer

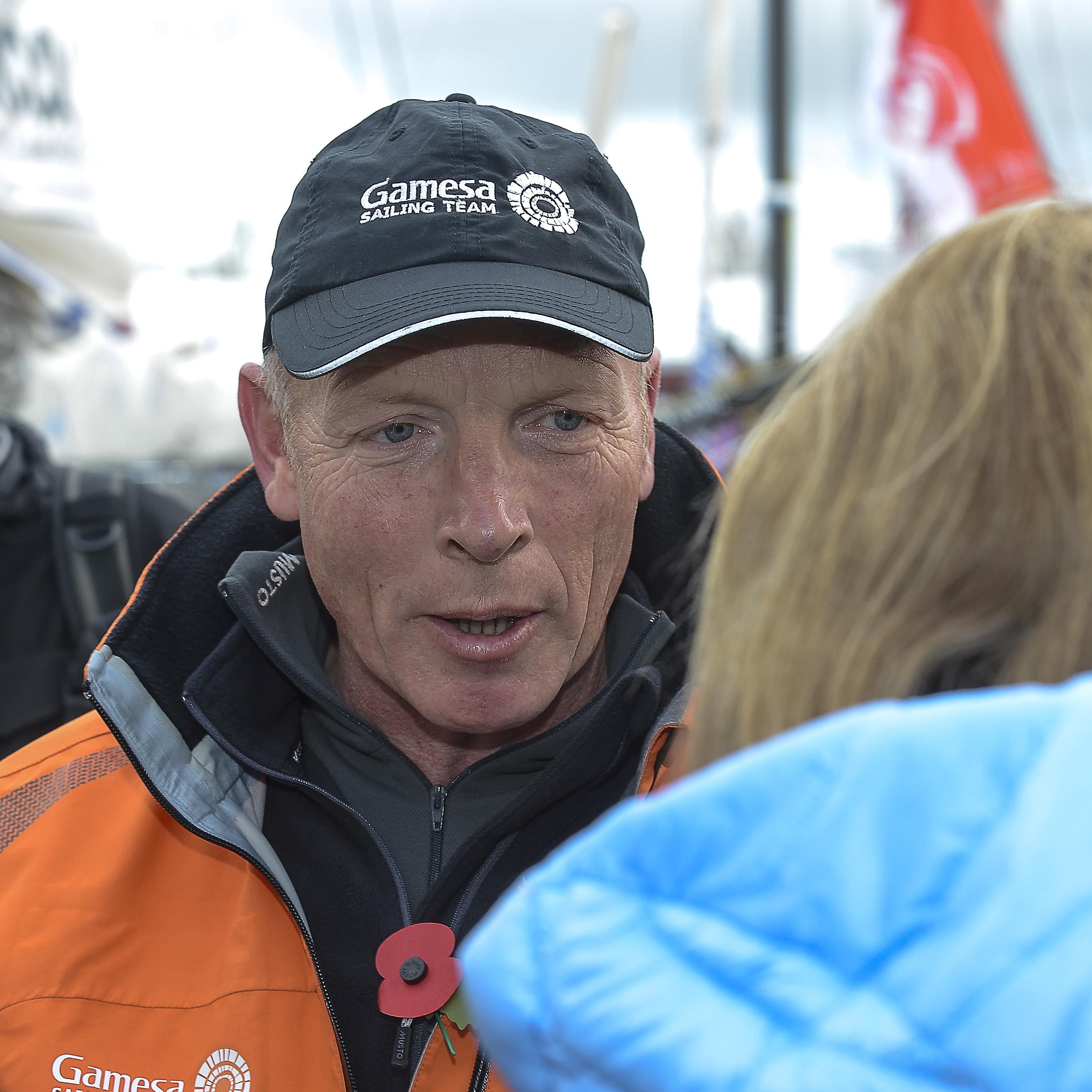
Mike Golding

Mike Golding (born 27 August 1960) is an English yachtsman, born in Great Yarmouth and educated at Reading Blue Coat School. He is one of the few yachtsmen to have raced round the world non-stop in both directions. He held the solo record for sailing round the world westabout (the most challenging direction for circumnavigation) between 1994 and 2000.

Golding, who was named president of London's Little Ship Club in 2017 and is a member of Royal Southampton Yacht Club, is the eponymous co-founder of the commercial company Mike Golding Yacht Racing Ltd. His partner in this venture was Jorgen Philip-Sorensen (d. 2010).

Golding led the team Group 4 to second place in the British Steel Challenge in 1992–3. He did one better in the next edition the BT Global Challenge 1996–7, taking first place with a new team of amateur sailors, again onboard Group 4.

Golding came seventh in the 2000–2001 Vendée Globe solo, non stop, round the world race having lost seven days to the dismasting of his Open 60, again called Group 4. His present Open 60 campaign is sponsored by Ecover, a Belgian ecological cleaning products company which has sponsored his team since 2001. In 2004, he won the IMOCA World Championship and successfully defended his title the following year, in which he also won the 2005 FICO World Championship. In the 2004 Vendée Globe, Golding finished third despite losing his keel — an accident which had caused boats in previous Vendée Globe races to overturn — on the last day of the race. He sailed the last fifty miles with a tiny sailplan to keep the boat upright.

In October 2006, he started the Velux 5 Oceans yacht race. He rescued fellow sailor Alex Thomson in the Southern Ocean, then the yacht Ecover had a mast failure with them both aboard. He announced he was retiring from the race on making emergency landfall in Cape Town.

In March 2007 Golding announced a technical partnership with fellow British sailor Dee Caffari to allow both the UK entries in the Vendée Globe 2008–9 round the world yacht race to work together.

Golding skippered the Ecover Sailing Team in the 2009 iShares cup, a selection of races all over Europe, sailing catamarans in fast, competitive races against world-leaders in this sport. The races took place in Venice, Hyères, Cowes, Kiel, Amsterdam and Almeria.

With four races to go in the iShares cup event in Cowes Week (Isle of Wight), Golding's team's dagger board broke but the team still completed the last four races and finished second in the last race.

Golding lives with his wife and son in Warsash, Hampshire, near Southampton.

== Career highlights ==
Pos	Year	Race	Class	Boat name	Notes	Ref
Round the World Races
6 / 20	2013	2012–2013 Vendée Globe	IMOCA 60	Gamesa	88d 6h 36' 26"	
DNF	2009	2008–2009 Vendée Globe	IMOCA 60	Ecover 3	Day 38: dismasted	
RET	2006	Velux 5 Oceans Race	IMOCA 60	Ecover 2		
3 / 20	2005	2004–2005 Vendée Globe	IMOCA 60	Ecover 2	88d 15h 15' 13" (Loses Keel)	
7 / 24	2001	2000–2001 Vendée Globe	IMOCA 60	Team Group 4	110d 16h 22' (Restarts)	
RET	1998	The Around Alone	IMOCA 60	Team Group 4	Ran Aground	
1	1997	BT Global Challenge Race	Challenge 67	Team Group 4	Skipper of 13 Amateur Crew	
WR	1994	World Record – Solo Non-Stop Westabout	Challenge 67	Team Group 4	167d 7h 42m 54s	
2	1993	British Steel Challenge Race	Challenge 67	Team Group 4	Skipper of 13 Amateur Crew	
Transatlantic Races
10	2011	Transat Jacques Vabre	IMOCA 60	Gamesa	with Bruno Dubois (CAN) (BEL)	
3	2009	Transat Jacques Vabre	IMOCA 60	Mike Golding Yacht Racing	with Javier Sanso (ESP)	
RET	2007	Transat B2B	IMOCA 60	Ecover III	Various Technical Issues	
5	2007	Transat Jacques Vabre	IMOCA 60	Ecover III	with Bruno Dubois (CAN) (BEL)	
4	2005	Transat Jacques Vabre	IMOCA 60	Ecover 2	with Dominique Wavre (SUI)	
1	2004	The Transat, 2004	IMOCA 60	Ecover 2		
5 / 15	2004	Transat Jacques Vabre	IMOCA 60	Hellomoto, GBR 75	with Conrad Humphreys (GBR)	
1	2003	Le Defi Atlantique	IMOCA 60	Ecover		
3	2003	Transat Jacques Vabre	IMOCA 60	Ecover	with Brian Thompson (GBR)	
2	2002	Route du Rhum	IMOCA 60	Ecover	13d 22 h 49 min 35 s	
2	2001	Transat Jacques Vabre	IMOCA 60	Ecover (1)	with Marcus Hutchinson (IRL)	
3	1999	The Europe 1 New Man STAR, 2000	IMOCA 60	Team Group 4		
3	1999	Transat Jacques Vabre	IMOCA 60	Team Group 4	with Ed Danby (GBR)	
Other significant races
3/8	2010	2010 Extreme Sailing Series	Extreme 40	Ecover Sailing Team	Skipper	
