= Ecover Sailing Team =

Career
- Nation: Great Britain
- Skipper: Mike Golding

Yachts
- Sail no.: Boat name

The Ecover Sailing team competed in the 2009 iShares Cup, showcasing world class racing around Europe. The races take place in Venice, Hyères, Cowes, Kiel, Amsterdam and Almeria, and the rebranded, 2010 Extreme Sailing Series.

== Sponsors ==
Ecover, the world's leading manufacturer of ecological cleaning and washing products, have sponsored skipper Mike Golding for more than eight years, as he has competed in the Vendée Globe, and World Championships.

== The Team ==
=== Mike Golding ===
Mike was IMOCA world champion for two successive years, and is the only British sailor to hold this sought-after title. He was the first person to race single-handed and non stop around the world in both directions. He is one of only two British sailors ever to stand on the podium of the Vendée Globe.

=== Fraser Brown ===
Fraser is one of the most experienced Extreme 40 sailors on the circuit having raced in the class from the outset. In 2008 his team won the first event, in Lugano, Switzerland, when he raced with double Olympic gold medalist Shirley Robertson.

=== Will Howden ===
Will Howden has been on the Extreme 40 circuit since 2005, and has competed in two Olympic games in the Tornado Catamaran.

=== Bruno Dubois ===
Bruno Dubois has sailed with Ecover and Mike Golding on many occasions on the IMOCA Open 60 Circuit. He has competed in the Whitbread Round the World Race, been crowned World Champion in the Corel 45 class and held a multihull speed record in his career.

=== Fifth Man ===
Extreme 40s are crewed by four sailors with an exclusive 'fifth man' spot, given over to a VIP or media guest. Guests on the Ecover boat include Iwan Thomas and Ben Fogle.

== The Boat ==
The Extreme 40 is one of the fastest boats on the water today, it is made from carbon fibre and can reach speeds of over 35 knots.

Length (LOA): 40 ft (12.19m)
Beam: 26 ft (7.92m)
Displacement: 1250 kg
Mast height: 62 ft (18.89m)
Mainsail: 75msq (upwind and downwind sailing)
Jib: 25msq (upwind sailing)
Gennaker: 78msq (downwind sailing)
Top speed: 40 knots
Designer: Yves Loday, in collaboration with TornadoSport
Builders: TornadoSport
