= 2000–2001 Vendée Globe =

Event title
- Name: 2000–2001 Vendée Globe
- Edition: 4th edition
- Sponsor: Vendee Region of France

Event details
- Start location: Les Sables-d'Olonne
- Finish location: Les Sables-d'Olonne
- Course: Solo non-stop round the world race
- Start date: 9 November 2000
- Finish date: 9 November 2000
- Yachts: IMOCA 60

Results
- (gold) Gold: Michel Desjoyeaux (FRA); PRB 2
- (silver) Silver: Ellen MacArthur (GBR); Kingfisher
- (bronze) Bronze: Roland Jourdain (FRA); Sill Matines La potagère

The 2000–2001 Vendée Globe is a non-stop solo round-the-world yacht race for IMOCA 50 and IMOCA 60 class yachts. This is the fourth edition of the race starting on 9 November 2000 from Les Sables-d'Olonne.

== Summary ==
The departure originally planned for Sunday, November 5 but the decision was made to delay the postponed start till Thursday, 9 November 2000 a delay of 4 days due to bad weather.

This race was the first major test of the new safety rules, introduced following the tragedies the previous races. Overall, it was a success; although some boats were again forced to retire from the race, none were lost. This race included the youngest-ever entrant, Ellen MacArthur, who at 24 years old competed in her custom-built boat Kingfisher.

Yves Parlier was the first to establish a lead, and headlines were made by Dominique Wavre of Switzerland on 10 December 2000 when his 430 nautical miles broke the 24-hour record for distance sailed single-handed. Parlier was soon under attack by Michel Desjoyeaux, who then moved into the lead. Parlier dismasted while pushing to catch up and lost contact with race organizers, resulting in MacArthur being diverted to provide assistance. MacArthur resumed racing when contact with Parlier was restored, and managed to maintain fourth place.

Desjoyeaux extended his lead to 600 miles (970 km) by Cape Horn, and MacArthur closed steadily, moving up to second place. By the mid-Atlantic she had caught up, and while negotiating the calms and variable winds of the Doldrums, the two traded the lead position several times.

MacArthur's chance to win was lost when she struck a semi-submerged container and was forced to make repairs. Desjoyeaux and PRB, flying the French flag, went on to win the race in 93d 3h 57', with MacArthur and Kingfisher under the flag of Great Britain finishing second at 94d 4h 25', and Roland Jourdain and Sill Matines La potagère, also under the French flag, finishing third at 96d 1h 2'. MacArthur pulled in to a rapturous reception, as "the youngest ever competitor to finish, the fastest woman around the planet — and only the second solo sailor to get around the globe in less than 100 days." Parlier, meanwhile, had anchored off New Zealand, and managed to fabricate by himself a new carbon-fibre mast from his broken one, and continuing racing, gained an official place.

== Results ==
Table: Order of Finish, 2000–2001 Vendée Globe
Pos	Sailor	Yacht	Time	Note	Ref
1	Michel Desjoyeaux (FRA)	PRB 2	93d 03h 57'	(new record)	
2	Ellen MacArthur (GBR)	Kingfisher	94d 04h 25'		
3	Roland Jourdain (FRA)	Sill Matines La potagère	96d 01h 02'		
4	Marc Thiercelin (FRA)	Active Wear	102d 20h 37'		
5	Dominique Wavre (SUI)	Union Bancaire Privée	105d 02h 45'		
6	Thomas Coville (FRA)	Sodébo	105d 07h 24'		
7	Mike Golding (GBR)	Team Group 4	110d 16h 22'		
8	(France) (Switzerland) Bernard Gallay	Voilà.fr	111d 16h 07'		
9	Josh Hall (GBR)	Gartmore	111d 19h 48'		
10	Joé Seeten (FRA)	Chocolats du Monde	115d 16h 46'		
11	Patrice Carpentier (FRA)	VM Matériaux	116d 00h 32'	IMOCA 50	
12	Simone Bianchetti (ITA)	Aquarelle.com	121d 01h 28'		
13	Yves Parlier (FRA)	Aquitaine Innovations	126d 23h 36'		
14	Didier Munduteguy (FRA)	DDP / 60e Sud	135d 15h 17'		
15	(Italy) Pasquale De Gregorio	Wind Telecomunicazioni	158d 02h 37'	IMOCA 50	
Did not finish
DNF	Catherine Chabaud (FRA)	Whirlpool-Europe 2	Dismasted		
DNF	Thierry Dubois (FRA)	Solidaires	Electronic problems		
DNF	Raphaël Dinelli (FRA)	Sogal Extenso	Damaged rudder		
DNF	Fyodor Konyukhov (RUS)	Modern University For The Humanities	retired		
DNF	Javier Sansó (ESP)	Old Spice	retired		
DNF	Éric Dumont (FRA)	Euroka Services	damaged rudder		
DNF	Richard Tolkien (GBR)	This Time – Argos – Help For Autistic Children	rig damage		
DNF	Bernard Stamm (SUI)	Armor-Lux/foies Gras	steering problem		
DNF	Patrick de Radiguès (BEL)	Libre Belgique	beached (IMOCA 50)		

== Entries ==
=== Participants gallery ===
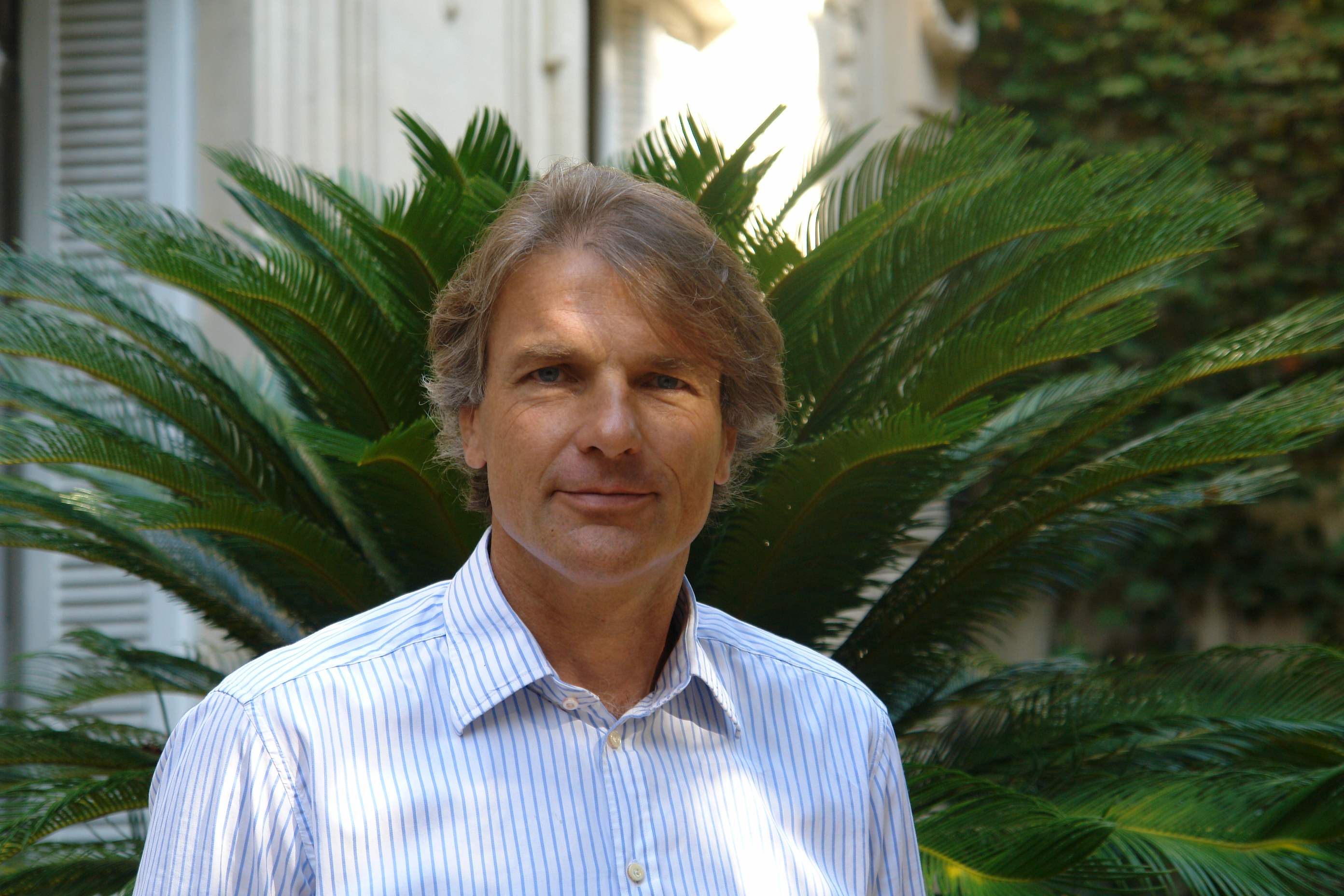
(France) (Switzerland) Bernard Gallay
Voilà.fr

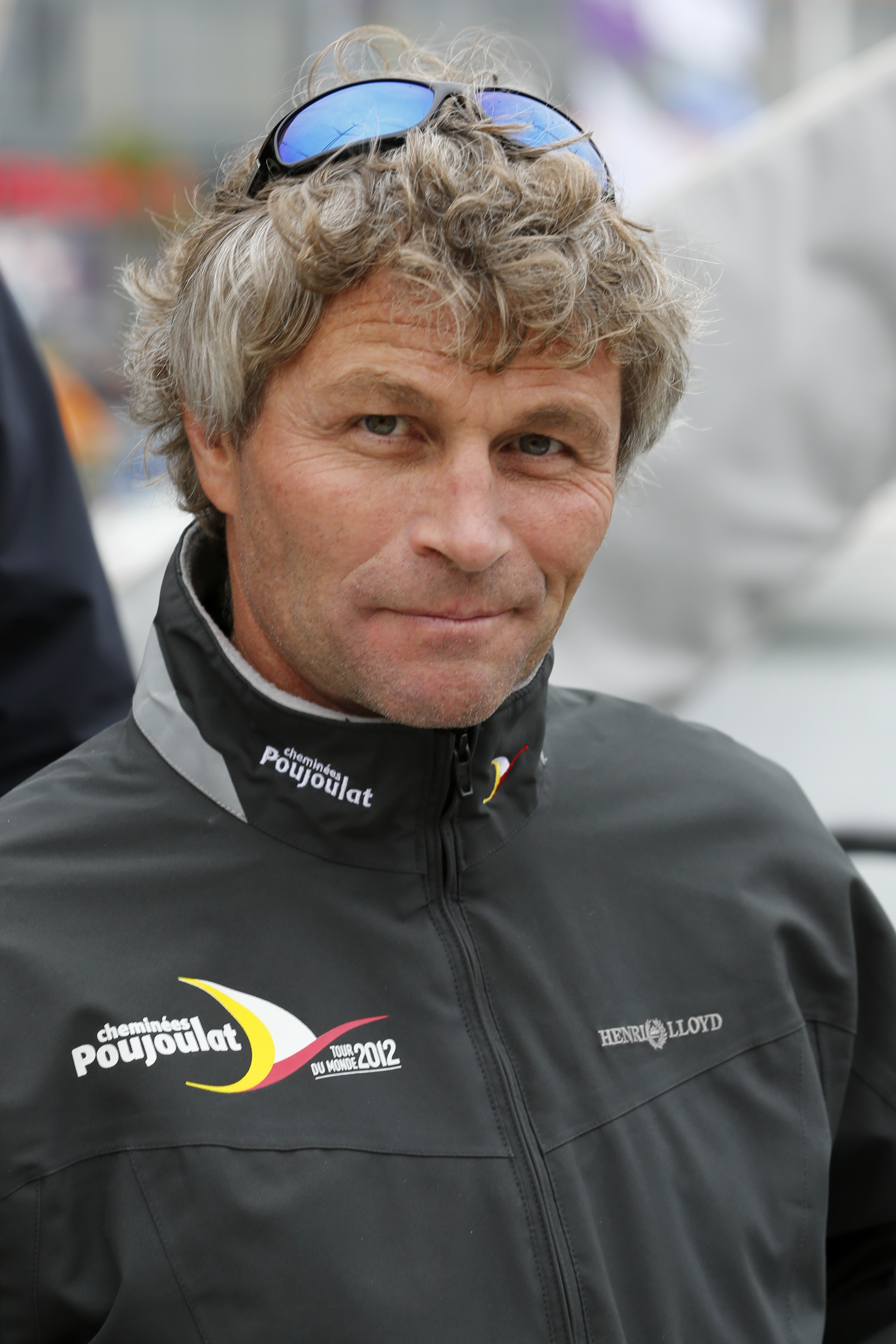
Bernard Stamm (SUI)
Armor-Lux/foies Gras

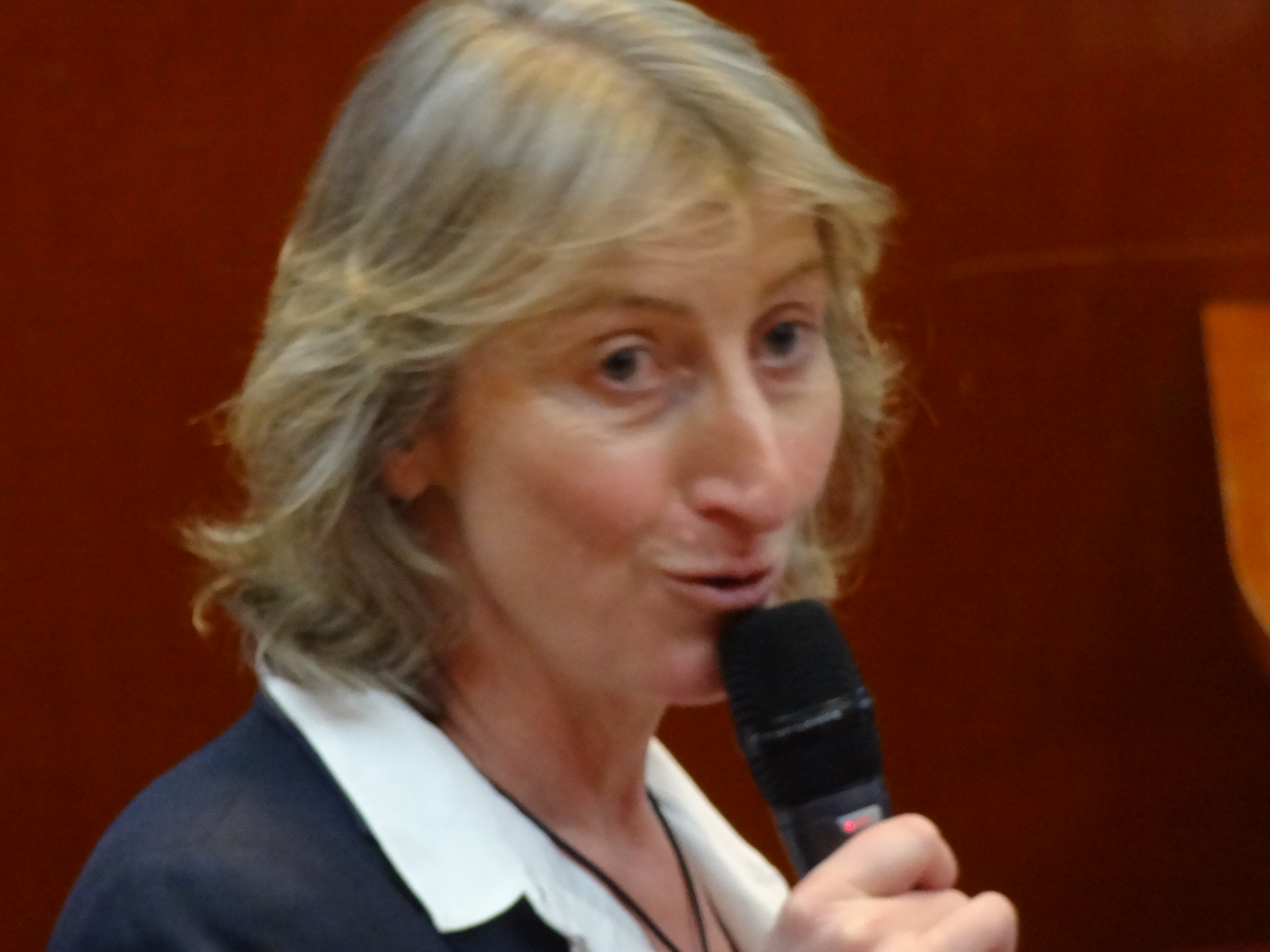
Catherine Chabaud (FRA)
Whirlpool-Europe 2

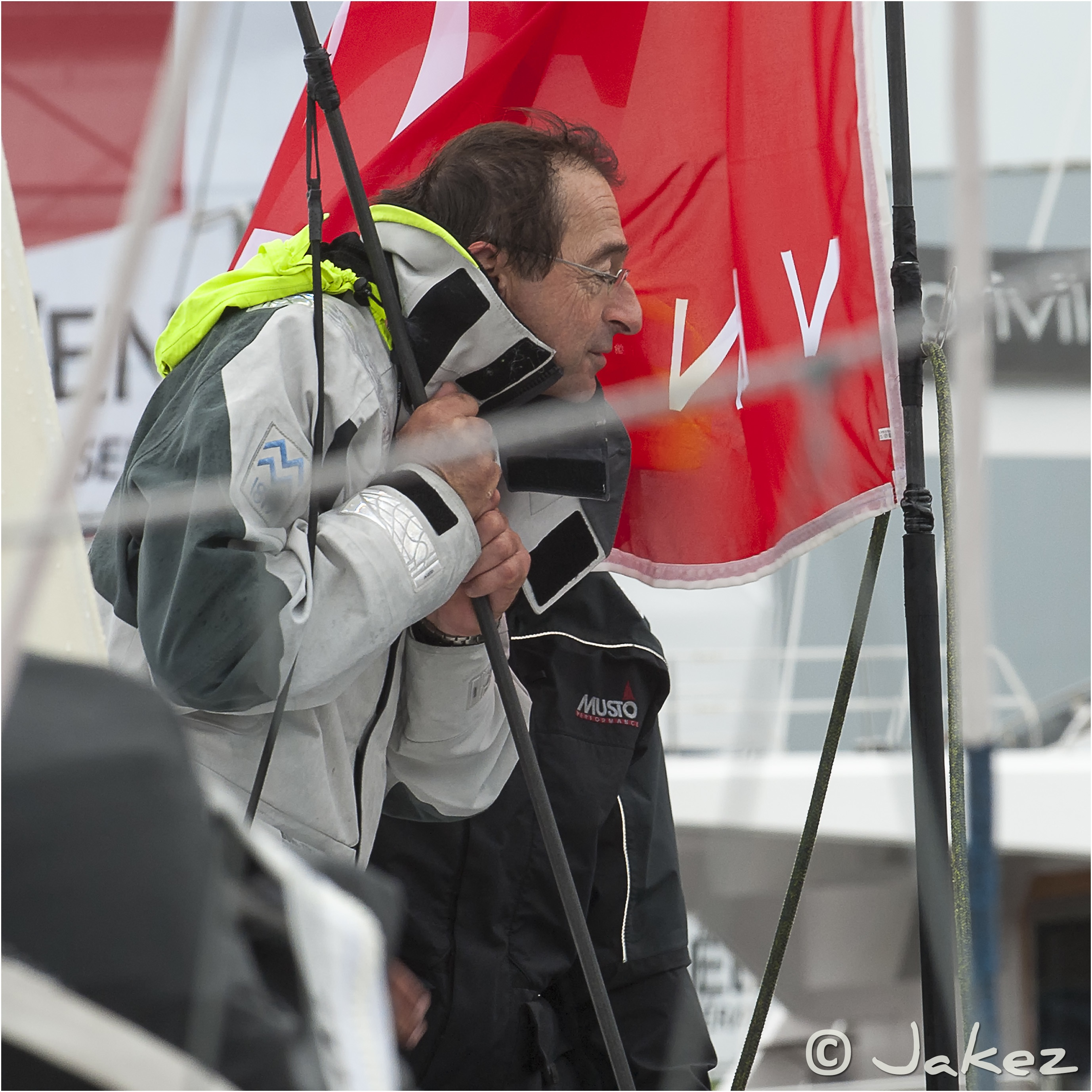
Dominique Wavre (SUI)
Union Bancaire Privée

Ellen MacArthur (GBR)
Kingfisher

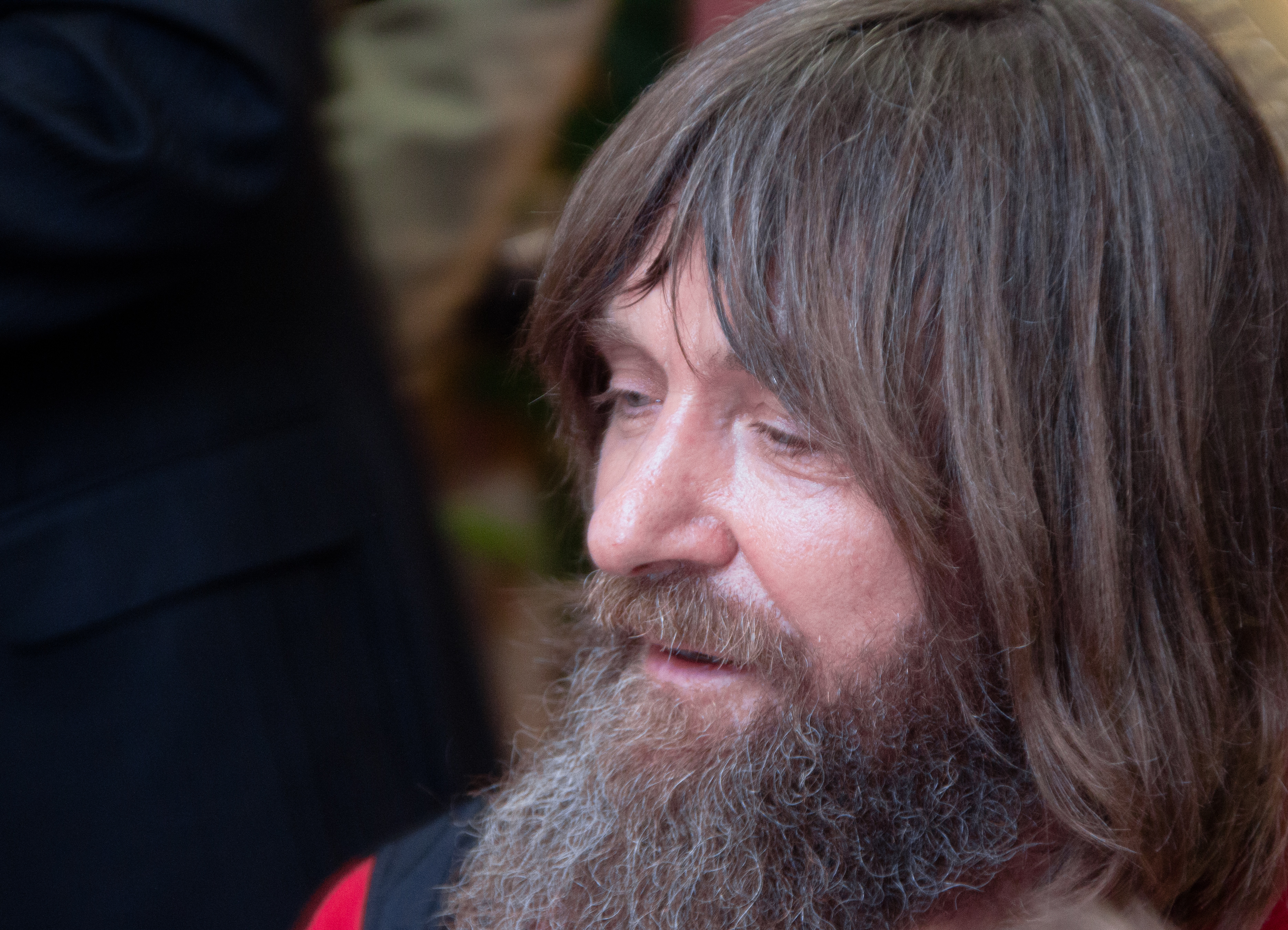
Fyodor Konyukhov (RUS)
Modern Univ./Humanities

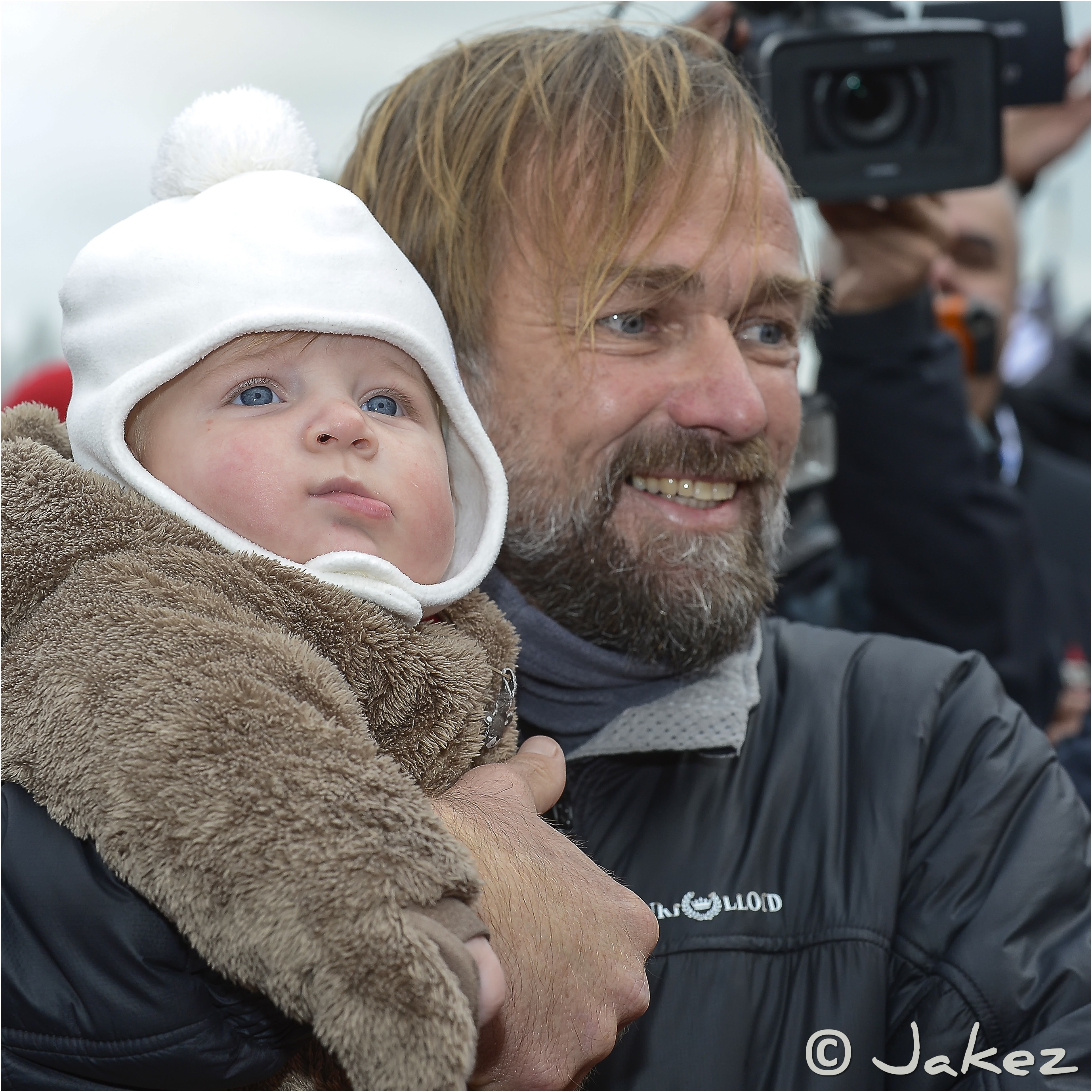
es (ESP)
Old Spice

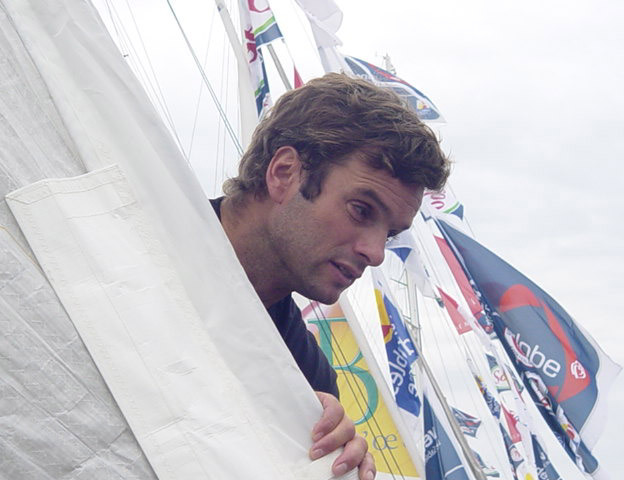
Marc Thiercelin (FRA)
Active Wear

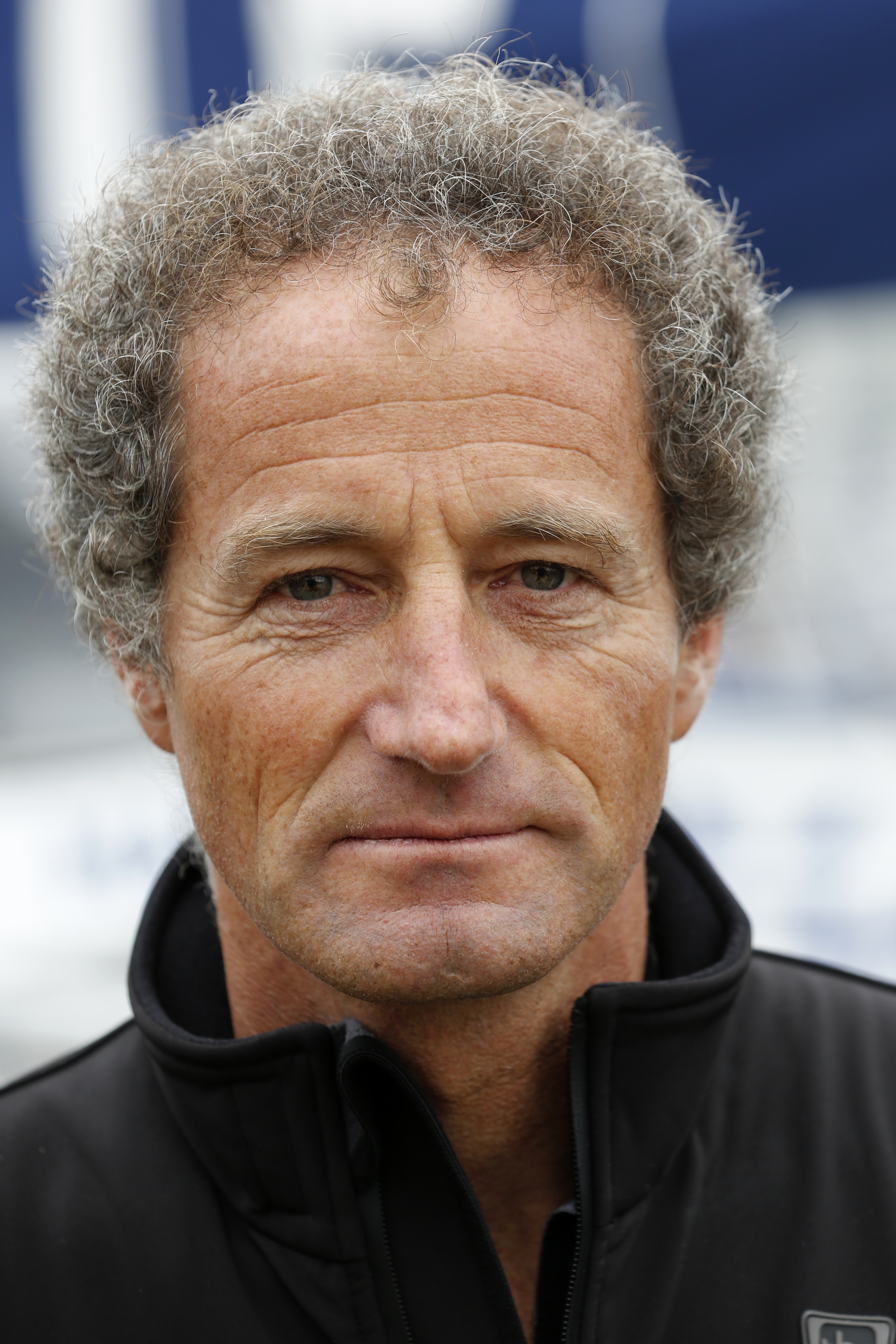
Michel Desjoyeaux (FRA)
PRB 2

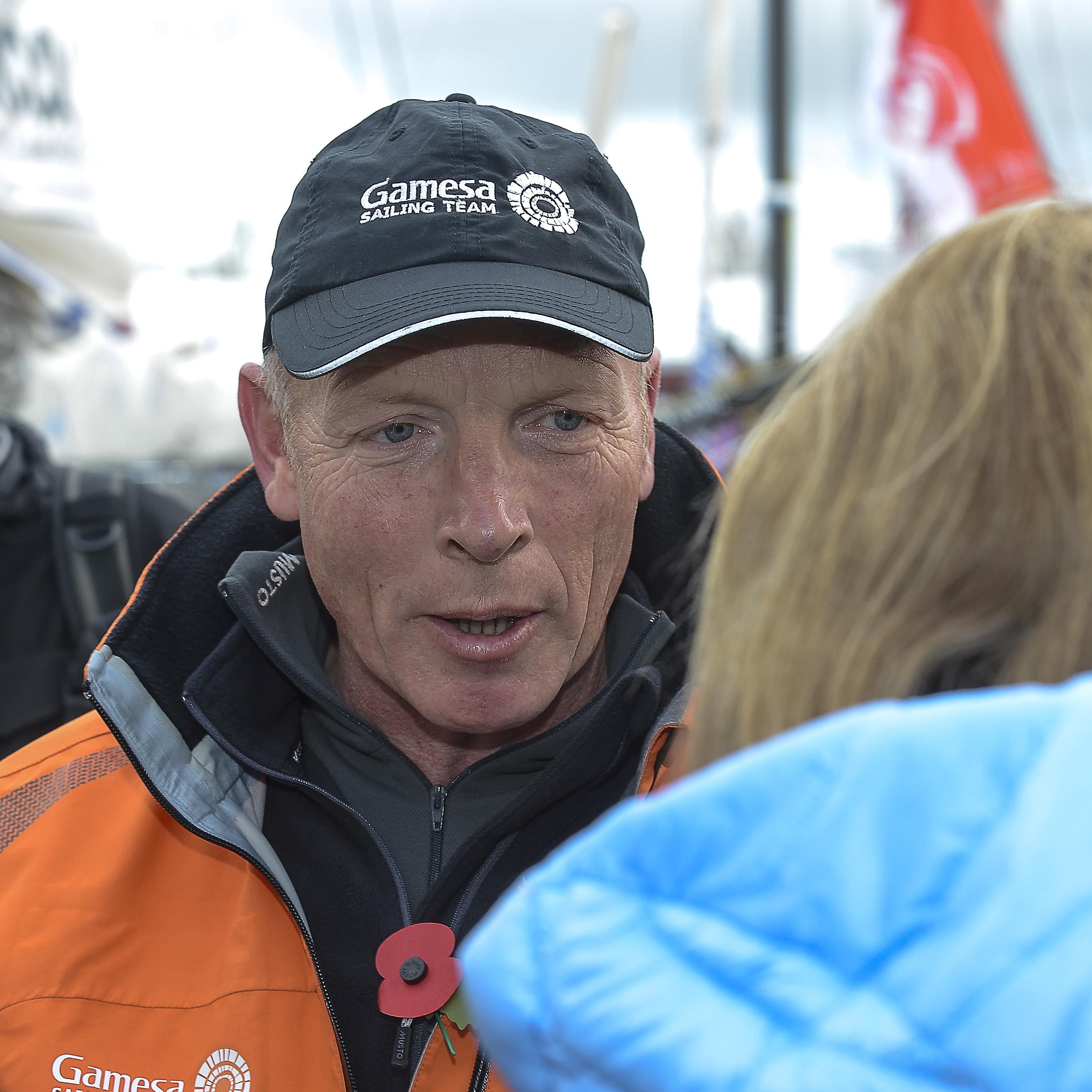
Mike Golding (GBR)
Team Group 4

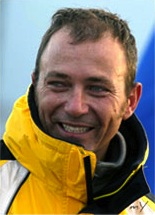
Raphaël Dinelli (FRA)
Sogal Extenso

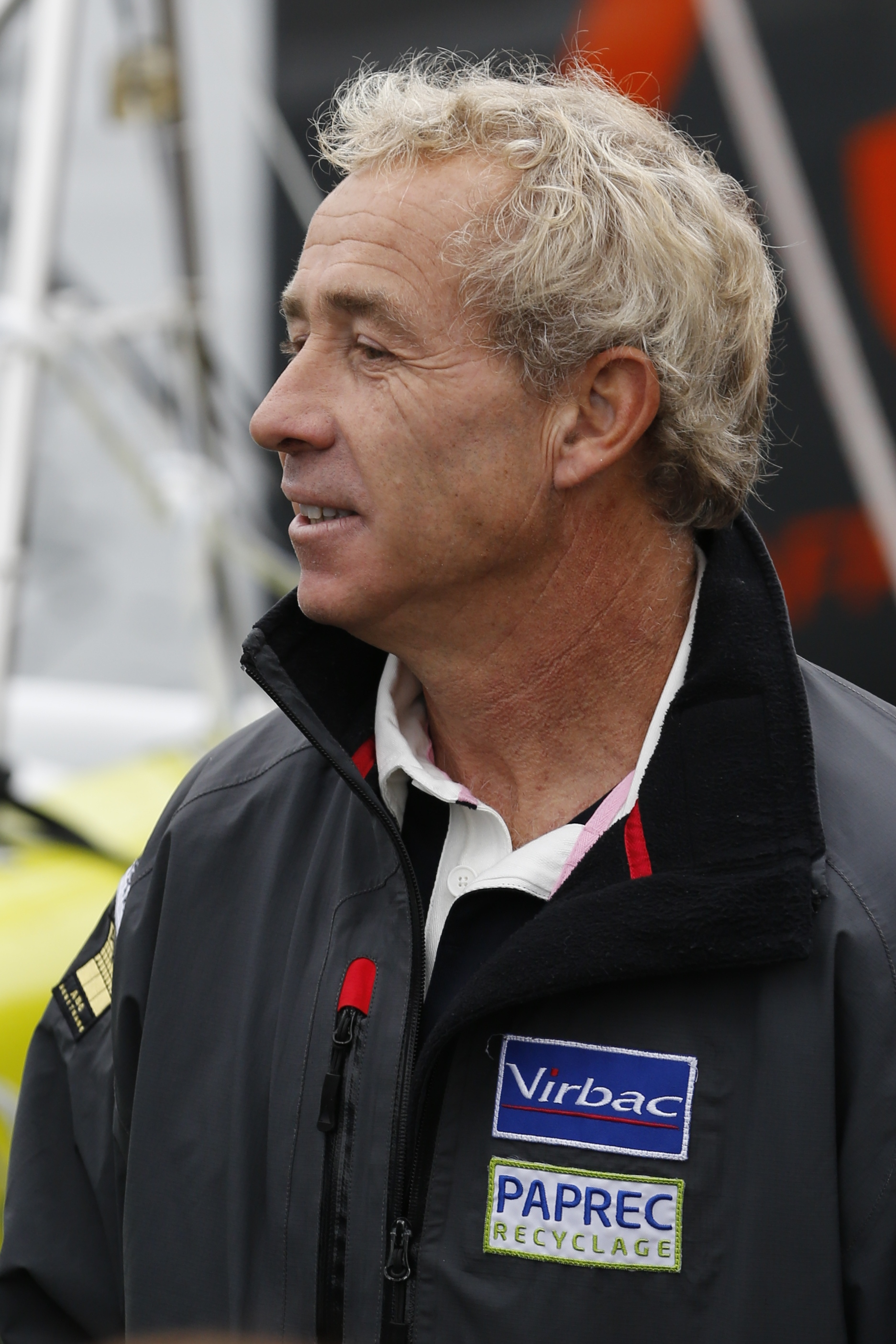
Roland Jourdain (FRA)
Sill Matines La potagère

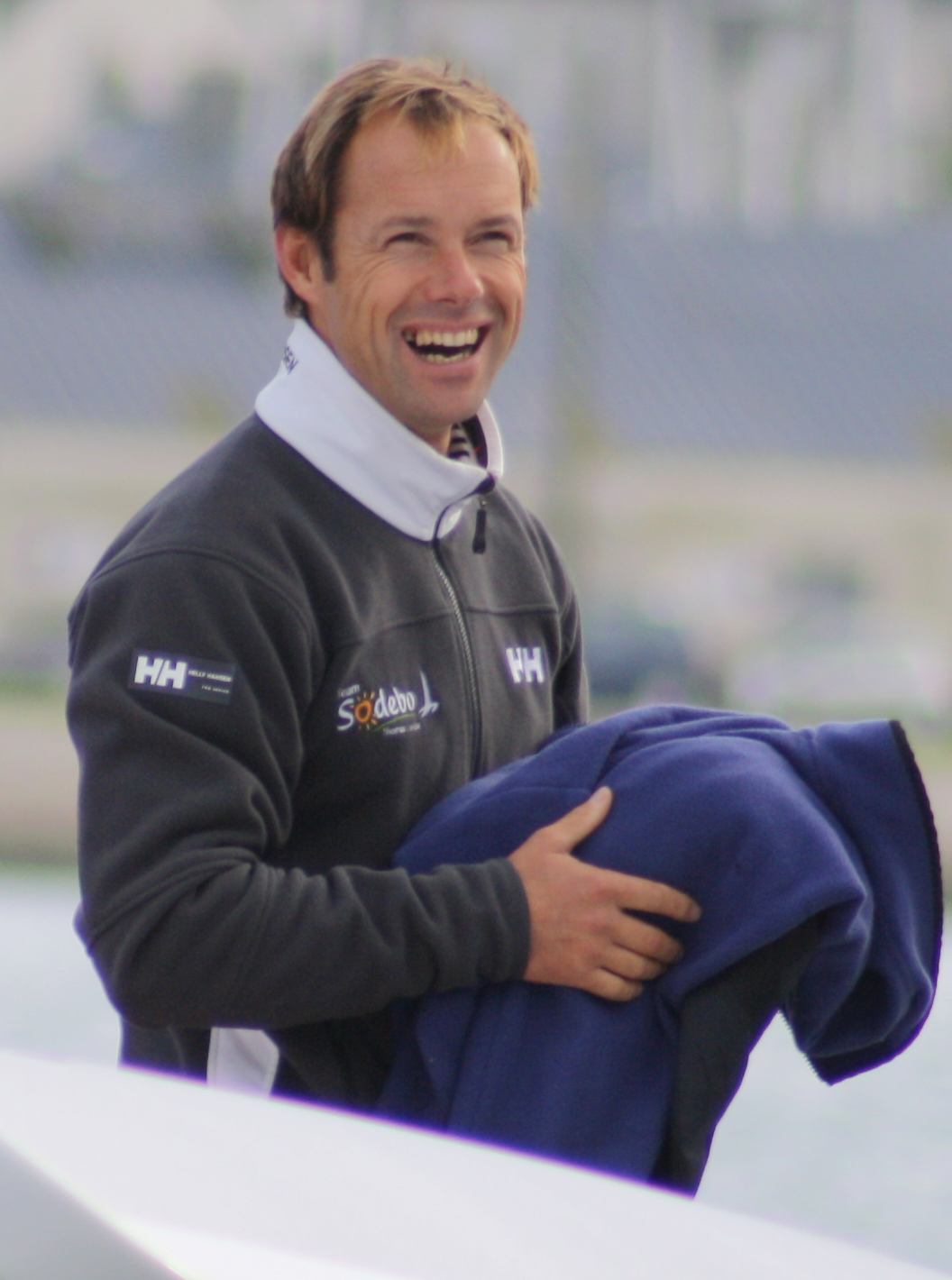
Thomas Coville (FRA)
Sodébo

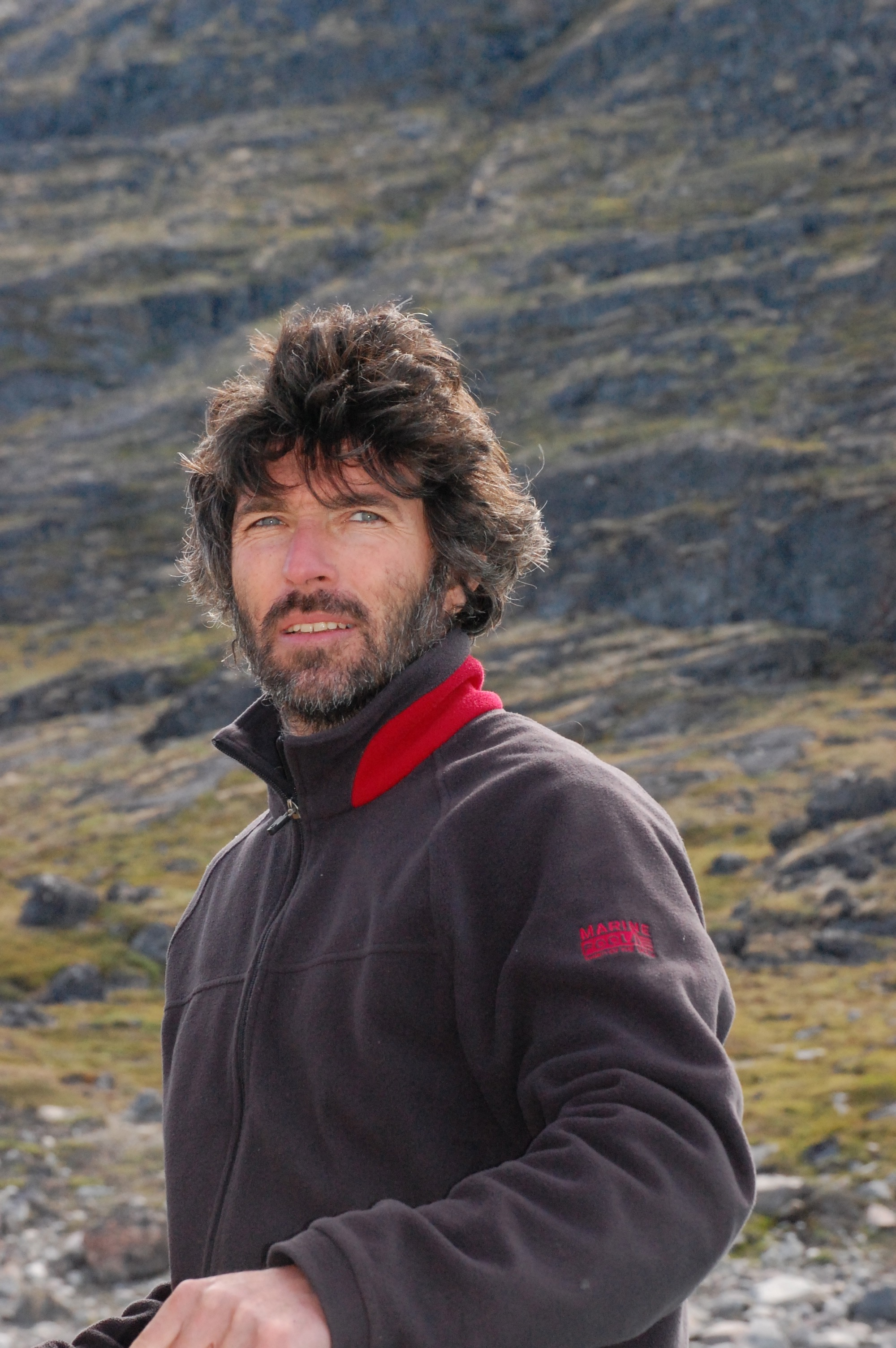
Thierry Dubois (FRA)
Solidaires

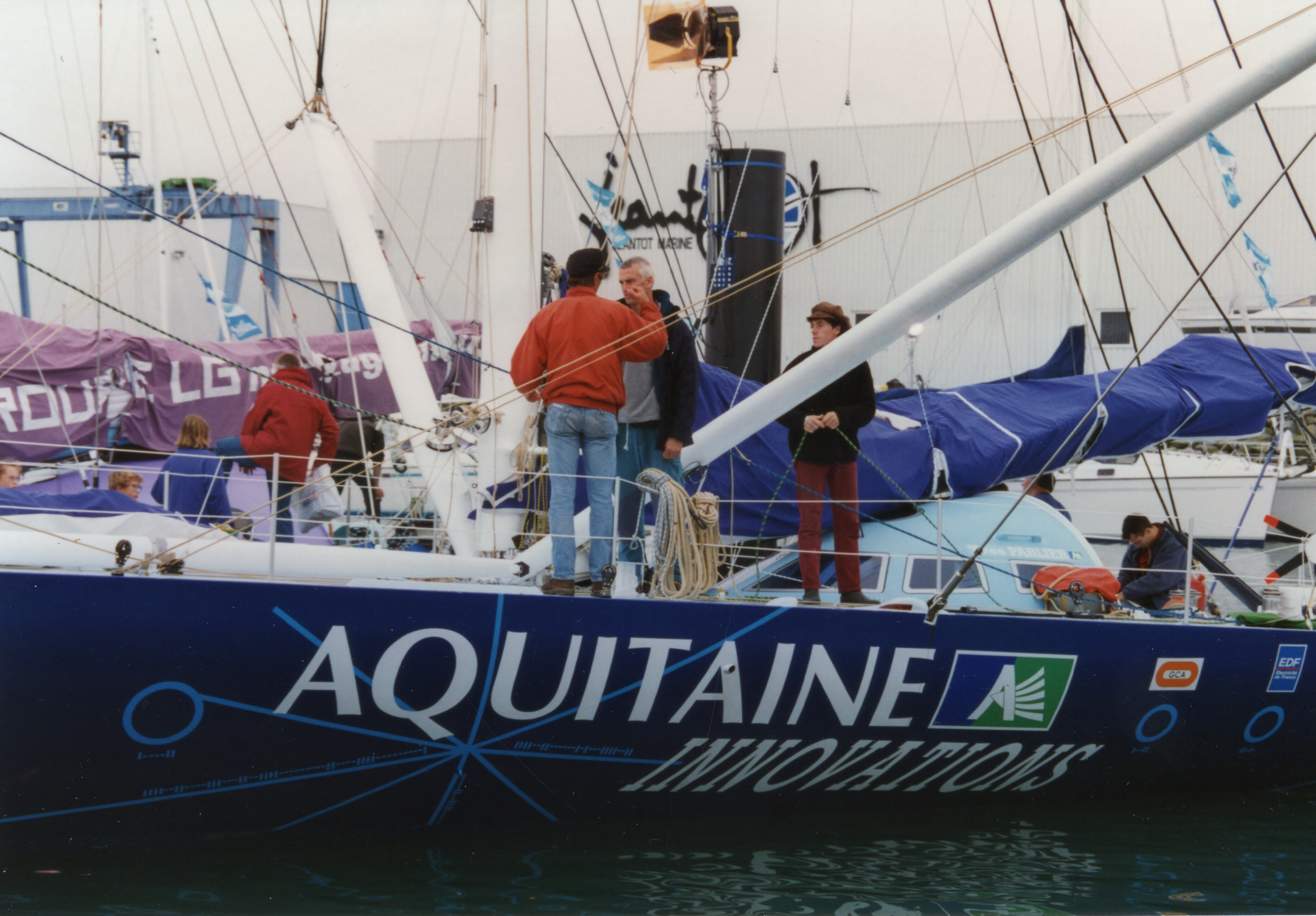
Yves Parlier (FRA)
Aquitaine Innovations

=== Participant facts equipment ===
Twenty skippers started the race a qualification passage was required to validate the registration of each boat, this course could have been carried out as part of another sailing race.

List of participants and equipment used
Skipper	Prev. participation (Start/Finish)	Name of boat	Sail no.	Naval architect	Builder	Launch date	Ref.
Bernard Gallay (FRA) (SUI)	1 / 0	Voilà.fr		Finot-Conq	JMV Industries	1994	
Bernard Stamm (SUI)	Never	Armor-Lux/foies Gras	SUI 77	Pierre Roland	Bernard Stamm	1998	
Catherine Chabaud (FRA)	1 / 6	Whirlpool-Europe 2	92	Lombard	Lemonchoix, at Mag	1998	
Dominique Wavre (SUI)	Never	Union Bancaire Privée	SUI 9	Finot-Conq	JMV	1999	
Didier Munduteguy (FRA)	1 / 0	DDP 60e Sud		Phil Morrison	Rowsell and Morrison	1990	
Ellen MacArthur (GBR)	Never	Kingfisher	888	Rob Humphreys; Mervin Owen	Marten Marine (NZL)	2000	
Javier Sansó (ESP)	Never	Old Spice		Ricardo Texedo	Talinco Composite (ESP)	1992	
Josh Hall (GBR)	Never	Gartmore		Finot-Conq	JMV Industries	1998	
Joé Seeten (FRA)	Never	Nord-pas-de-Calais/chocolats du Monde		Harle Mortain	CDK	1991	
Marc Thiercelin (FRA)	1 / 1 (2nd)	Active Wear		Finot-Conq	JMV Industries	1998	
Michel Desjoyeaux (FRA)	Never	PRB 2	FRA 85	Finot-Conq	MAF (FRA)	2000	
Mike Golding (GBR)	Never	Team Group 4	GBR 4	Finot-Conq	JMV Industries	1998	
Pasquale de Gregorio (ITA)	Never	Wind	ITA 159	Umberto Felci	Dolphin (Rome) and SC (Latina)	2000	IMOCA 50
Patrice Carpentier (FRA)	1 / 0	VM Matériaux	96	Adrian Thompson	Goss Challenge	1996	IMOCA 50
Patrick de Radiguès (BEL)	1 / 0	Lightning	17	Berret-Racoupeau	FK Boats (ITA)	2000	IMOCA 50
Raphaël Dinelli (FRA)	1 / 0	Sogal Extenso					
Richard Tolkien (GBR)	Never	This Time – Argos – Help For Autistic Children		Bouvet-Petit	MAG	1992	
Roland Jourdain (FRA)	1 / 0	Sill Matines La Potagère		Marc Lombard	JMV Industries	2004-04-26	
Simone Bianchetti (ITA)	1 / 0	Aquarelle.com		Philippe Briand	Jeanneau JTA	1989	
Thomas Coville (FRA)	Never	Sodébo		Finot-Conq	Kiere / Thierry Eluere	1998	
Yves Parlier (FRA)	2 / 1 (4th)	Aquitaine Innovations		Finot-Conq	Thierry Eluere / Composites Aquitaine	1996	
