= Simon Walker (sailor) =

English yachtsman, adventurer, author (born 1968)

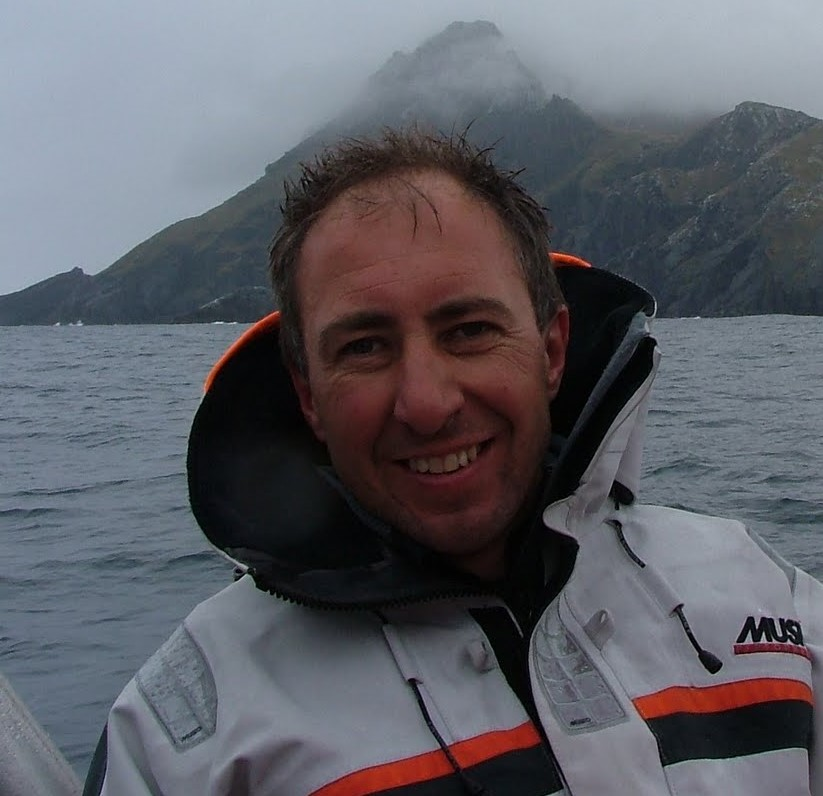
- Walker sailing past Cape Horn, March 2007
- Born: 25 February 1968 (age 58)
- Occupations: Yachtsman; adventurer; businessman

Simon Walker is an English yachtsman, adventurer and businessman. He is one of only a handful of people who have raced the wrong way around the world more than once.

Walker raced on board Rhone Poulenc as the mate in the British Steel Challenge in 1992–3, and again as Skipper of Toshiba Wave Warrior in the next edition, the BT Global Challenge 1996–7. He finished 2nd overall and was the youngest skipper in the fleet.

He won the first Teacher's Whisky Round Britain Challenge race in 1995. Outside of racing he has also led sailing expeditions to the Arctic and Antarctica.

He then went on to become the managing director of the race organiser Challenge Business and was instrumental in the next two events, the BT Global Challenge 2000/1 and the Global Challenge 2004/5. During this time he employed the Princess of Wales (then Catherine Middleton) for a summer job prior to her going to University. As managing director, he also oversaw several editions of the Atlantic Rally for Cruisers (ARC), the world's largest trans-ocean yachting event.

He also was chief executive of Challenge Business inc based in San Francisco while the business attempted to establish a US based round the world race, the New World Challenge.

He has been an entrepreneur, author and speaker, specialising in leadership and in particular Generation Y. He was a co-founder of the online leadership coaching system, my360plus and the consultancy Talentsmoothie and the co-author of Generation Y: what they want from work.

Since 2010 he has been a non-executive director of The Adventurists, organisers of the Kraken Cup Ngalawa race in East Africa.

He was previously the managing director of the Paramotor manufacturer, Parajet, and has flown a paramotor from Victoria Falls to Johannesburg in preparation for the Icarus Trophy in 2018.

As of 2026, Walker is director of programs at Blakcro, a UK-based defence company developing powered paragliders for military special operations forces.
