= IMOCA 60 Group 4 =

Sailboat

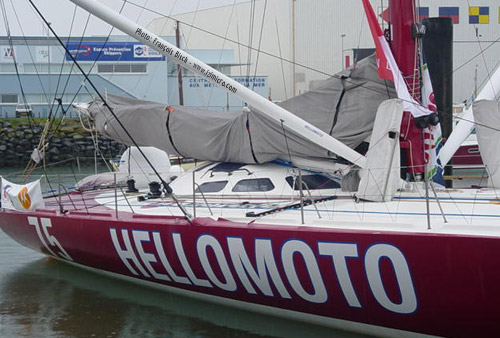

Development
- Designer: Group Finot
- Builder: JMV Industries

Hull

Racing
- Class association: IMOCA 60

The IMOCA 60 class yacht Group 4 was designed by Finot-Conq, made by JMV in Cherbourg in France, and launched in 1998. It was the runner-up in the 2001 Transat Jacques Vabre.

== Racing results ==
Pos	Year	Race	Class	Boat name	Skipper	Notes	Ref
Round the world races
7 / 20	2004	2004–2005 Vendée Globe	IMOCA 60	Hellomoto	Conrad Humphreys (GBR)	104d 14h 32m	.
7 / 27	2002	2000–2001 Vendée Globe	IMOCA 60	Group 4	Mike Golding (GBR)	110d 16h	
DNF	1998	1998 The Around Alone	IMOCA 60	Group 4 Securitas	Mike Golding (GBR)	Ran Aground off New Zealand	
Transatlantic Races
14 / 17	2008	Transat Jacques Vabre	IMOCA 60	Aviva, GBR 111	Dee Caffari (GBR); Nigel King (GBR)	20d 08h 10m	
5 / 15	2004	The Transat, 2004	IMOCA 60	HELLOMOTO, GBR 75	Conrad Humphreys (GBR)	13d 20h	
2 / 12	2001	Transat Jacques Vabre	IMOCA 60	Ecover (1)	Mike Golding (GBR); Marcus Hutchinson (IRL)	16d 18h 40m	
3	1999	Transat Jacques Vabre	IMOCA 60	Group 4 Securitas	Mike Golding (GBR); Edward Danby (GBR)		
Other Races
