= Challenge 67 =

Steel-hulled yacht

The Challenge 67 is a steel-hulled yacht. It is 67 ft (20 m) from bow to stern, and this is where it gets its name. There were 14 of these yachts built, for the purpose of racing in the BT Global Challenge.

The yachts were designed by David Thomas and Thanos Condylis, and built by Devonport Management Limited.

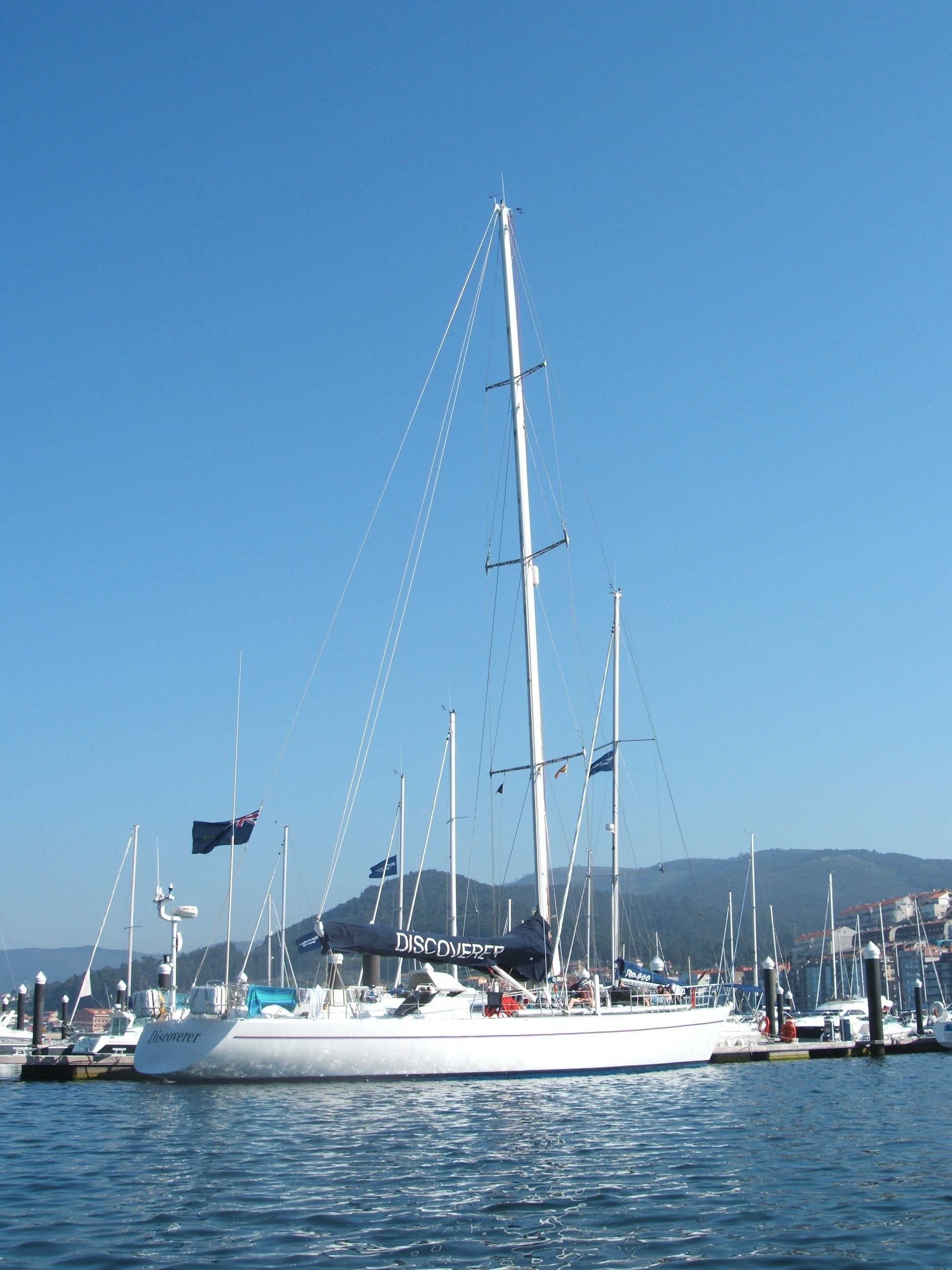
Challenge 67 in Bayona, Spain

== Specifications ==
- Mast Height – 85 ft 3 in (25.98 m)
- Sail Area Upwind – 2454 sqft (228sq m)
- Sail Area Downwind – 4754 sqft (441sq m)
- Overall length – 67' (20.42 m)
- Beam – 17 ft 3 in (5.26 m)
- Draught – 9 ft 6 in (2.82 m)
- Displacement – 40 tons
- Hull – 50B mild steel
- Deck – 316 Stainless steel
- Keel weight – 12 Tons
- Engine – Perkins 130 HP
- Generator – Perkins 27 HP
- Fuel – 385 gallons (1600 litres)
- Water – 242 gallons (1100 litres)
- Berths – 14 in six cabins
