= Marc Thiercelin =

French skipper and navigator

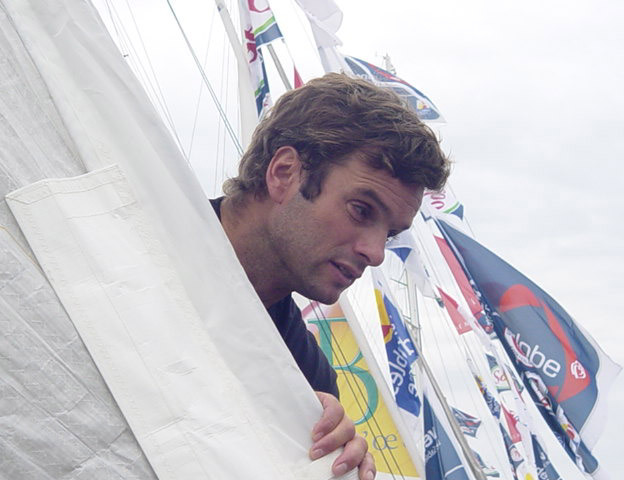
- 2004 Vendée Globe start

Personal information
- Nickname: Captain Marck
- Nationality: French
- Born: 29 October 1960 (age 64); Saâcy-sur-Marne

Sailing career
- Class: IMOCA 60

Marc Thiercelin, known as "Captain Marck", is a French professional yachtsman, born on October 29, 1960, in Saâcy-sur-Marne (Seine-et-Marne). He totals five solo rounds of the world together with 22 transatlantic races, seven editions of the Solitaire du Figaro (two stage wins) and five Tour de France sailing. He completed four complete tours of Antarctica and four solo Cape Horns for a total of 700,000 km covered on all the world's oceans.

== Race result highlights ==
- 2nd 1996–1997 Vendée Globe
- 2nd 1998–1999 Around Alone Race
- 4th 2000–2001 Vendée Globe
- DNF 2004–2005 Vendée Globe
- DNF 2008–2009 Vendée Globe
