= Anna Corbella =

Spanish sailor

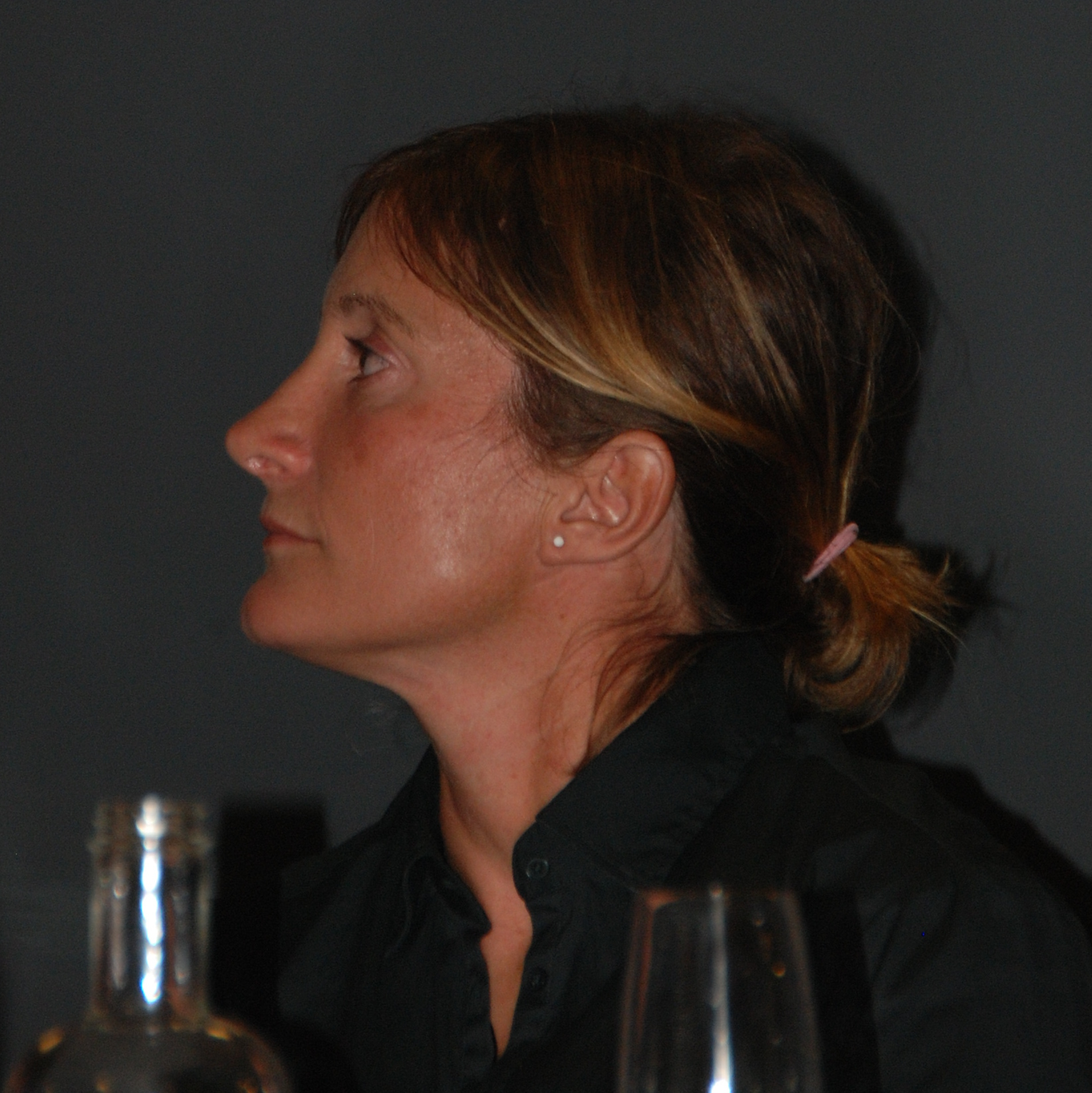
- Corbella in 2014
- Born: Anna Cornella i Jordi; 1976 (age 49–50); Barcelona, Catalonia, Spain
- Education: Autonomous University of Barcelona
- Occupations: sailor, vet
- Known for: round the world voyages

Anna Corbella i Jordi (born 1976) is a Catalan Spanish sailor. She was the first Spanish woman to sail non-stop around the world and the third woman to do it twice.

== Life ==
Corbella was born in 1976 in Barcelona and by the age of four she was on a boat with her parents.

She studied in her home city and she graduated in veterinary medicine at the Autonomous University of Barcelona. Corbella had begun sailing early and by 1999 she was the Spanish champion in the 420 class dinghy. In the following year she was the national champion in the 470 class. In 2009 she turned professional.

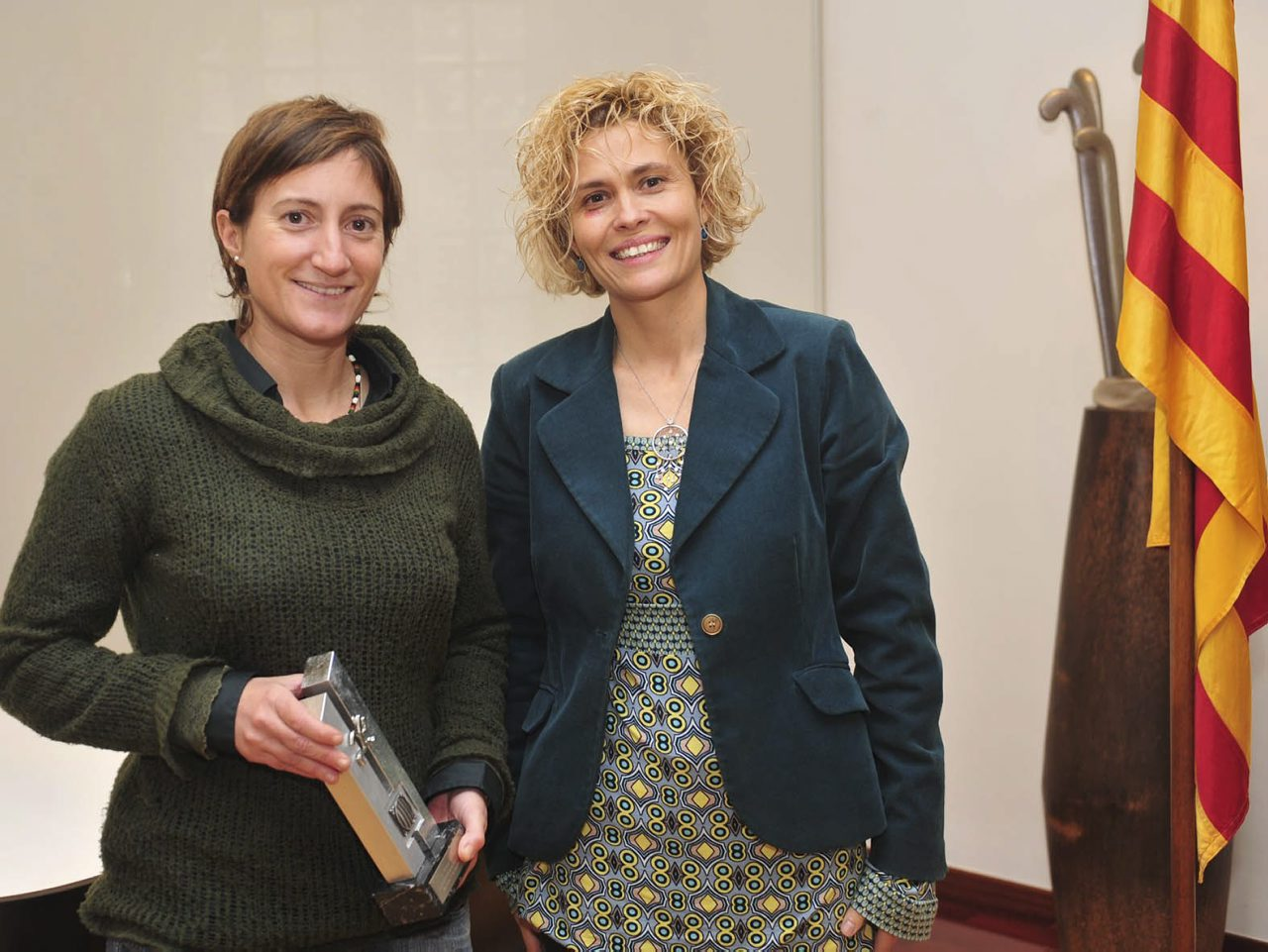
The Catalan Sport secretary general Anna Pruna i Grivé congratulates Corbella after her Transat race

She competed in the Mini Transat 650, a solo transatlantic race from Fort Boyard in France and finishing in Salvador de Bahia in Brazil. She finished in 13th position. The following year Corbella participated, together with the British Dee Caffari, in the Barcelona World Race 2010-2011 aboard the Gaes Centros Auditivos, finishing in 6th position. They were the first female crew and they completed the voyage in 102 days, which was nine days behind the leading pair.

In the next edition of the Barcelona World Race, in 2015, she finished in third position on board the same boat with Gerard Martín. They had completed the 28,000 mile crossing much quicker (in 91 days) and in a higher position than her previous voyage. They had achieved this despite an injury to her knee that meant that Gerard Martin had had to sail the boat solo for several days. She joined Dee Caffari and Ellen MacArthur as the first three women to complete the non-stop voyage round the world twice.

Among other awards, Corbella received the silver medal of the Royal Order of Sports Merit in 2011, the regatta of the year 2010 of the Royal Spanish Sailing Federation, as well as the special mention of IV Women and Sports Award 2010 .
