= Dominique Wavre =

Swiss sailor, skipper and navigator

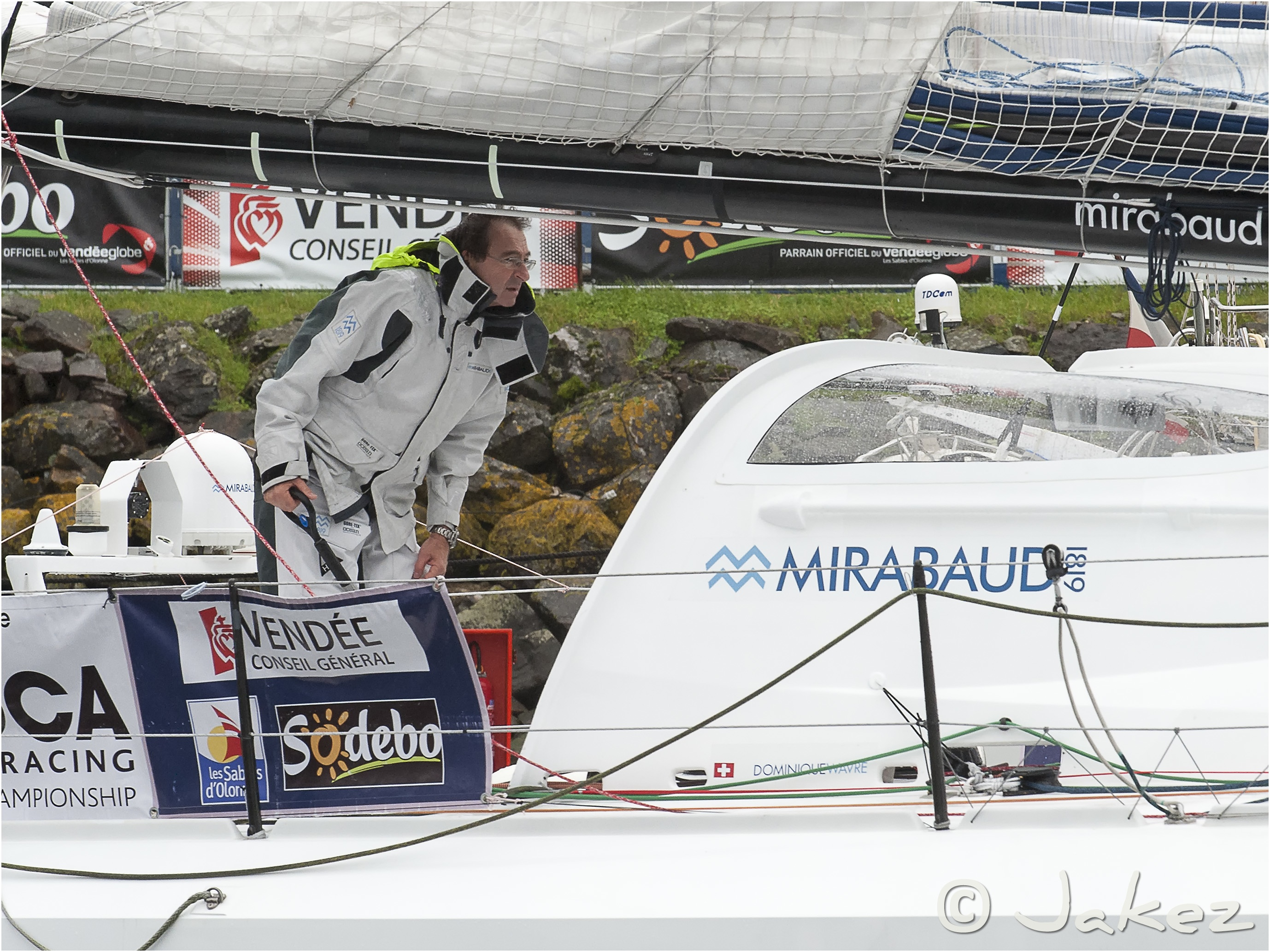
- 2012 Vendee Globe start

Personal information
- Nationality: Swiss
- Born: 4 July 1955 (age 70) Geneva

Sport

Sailing career
- Class: IMOCA 60

Dominique Wavre, is a Swiss professional yachtsman, born on 4 July 1955 in Geneva, Switzerland. Having sailed over 360,000 nautical miles, Dominique now ranks among the most experienced ocean sailors

== Biography ==
Son of tennis player Alice Charbonnier he started on the courts before discovering sailing at the age of 13. He began sailing on Lake Geneva but continued his studies and became an art teacher. Then he sailed with Pierre Fehlmann in 1981 in the Whitbread onboard Disc d'Or III. Since then, he'll keep accumulating miles. He met his partner Michèle Paret during the 1989-90 Whitebread as she was sailing with Tracy Edwards onboard Maiden

== Race result highlights ==
Pos.	Race	Class	Boat name	Time	Notes	Ref.
Round the World Races
7	2012–2013 Vendée Globe	IMOCA 60	Mirabaud	90 d 03 h 14 min	Solo None Stop	
RET	2011 Barcelona World Race	IMOCA 60	Mirabaud		with Michèle Paret	
RET	2008–2009 Vendée Globe	IMOCA 60	Temenos II			
3	2008 Barcelona World Race	IMOCA 60	Temenos II		with Michèle Paret	
4	2004–2005 Vendée Globe	IMOCA 60	Temenos	92 d 17 h 13 min 20 s	Solo None Stop	
5	2000–2001 Vendée Globe	IMOCA 60	Union bancaire Privée	105 d 02 h 45 min	Solo None Stop	
2	1993–1994 Whitbread Round the World Race	Volvo Ocean 60	Intrum Justitia		Fully Crewed Stopping	
2	1989–1990 Whitbread Round the World Race	Maxi	Merit		Fully Crewed Stopping	
4	1985–1986 Whitbread Round the World Race	Maxi	UBS Switzerland		Fully Crewed Stopping	
Transatlantic Races
8	2008	Transat Jacques-Vabre	IMOCA 60	Mirabaud	with Michèle Paret	
5	2006	Route du Rhum	IMOCA 60	Temenos II		
4	2005	Transat Jacques-Vabre	IMOCA 60	Ecover	with Mike Golding (GBR)	
2	2004	The Transat	IMOCA 60	Temenos	12d 18hr 22min	
7	2003	Transat Jacques-Vabre	IMOCA 60	Carrefour Prevention	with Michèle Paret	
7	2001	Transat Jacques-Vabre	IMOCA 60	Temenos	with Michèle Paret	
9	2000	The Europe 1 New Man STAR	IMOCA 60	Union Bancaire Privée	17d 17hr 2min	
2	1998	Transat AG2R	IMOCA 60	Carrefour Prevention	with Michèle Paret	
5	1996	Transat AG2R	IMOCA 60	Cupid	with Michèle Paret	
14	1984	Transat Québec-Saint-Malo		Mecarillos		
Other
2	1997	Solitaire du Figaro	Beneteau Figaro			
9	1996	Solitaire du Figaro	Beneteau Figaro			
2	1991	Tour de France à la voile	Selection			
2	1990	Solitaire du Figaro	Beneteau Figaro			
14	1984	Solitaire du Figaro	Beneteau Figaro			
