= IMOCA 60 Bonduelle 2 =

Round the World Racing Yacht

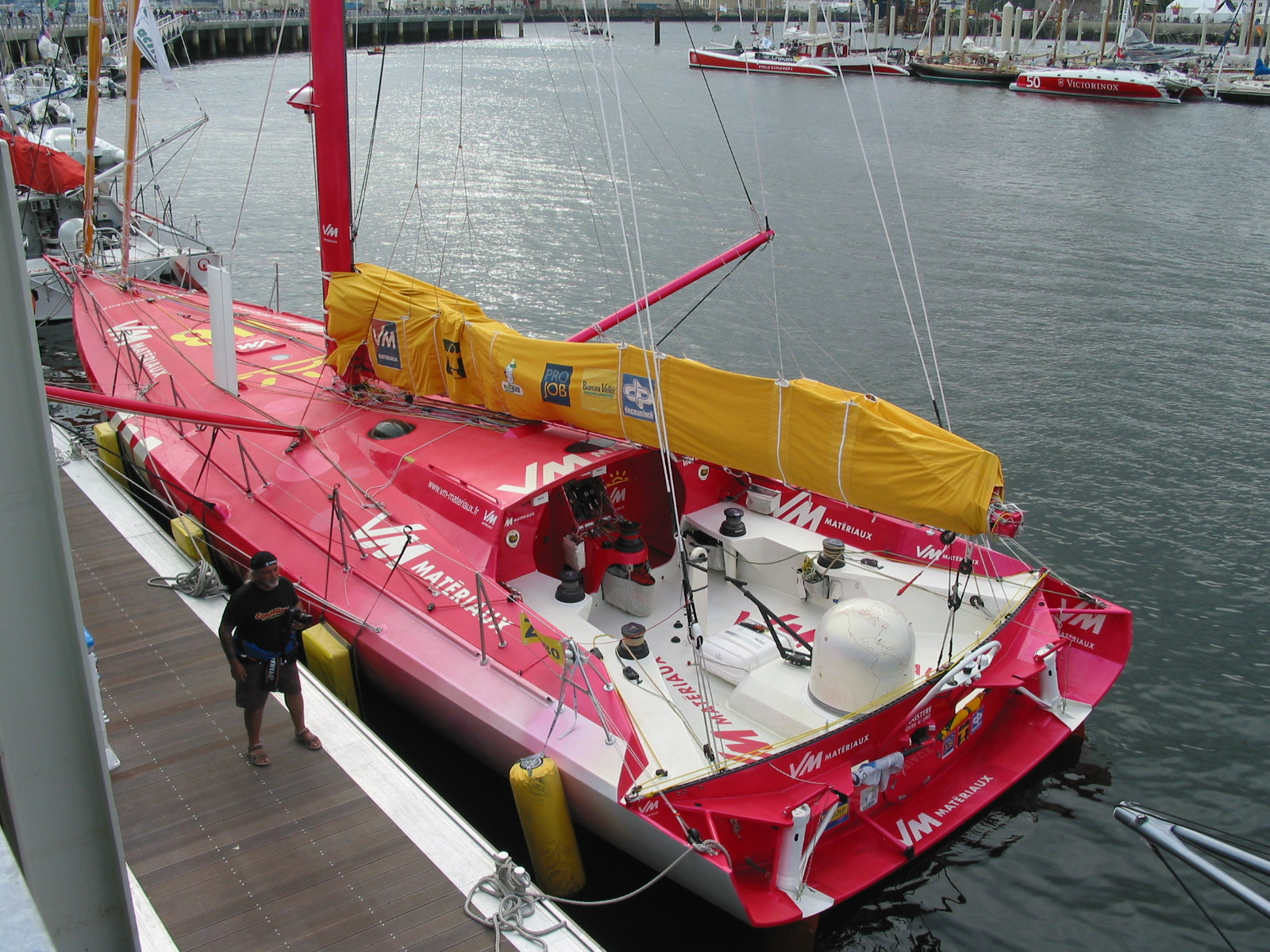

Development
- Designer: Marc Lombard, Marc Lombard Yacht Design Group
- Year: April 2004
- Builder: JMV Industries

The IMOCA 60 class yacht Bonduelle 2, FRA 59 was designed by Marc Lombard and launched in the April 2004 after being built by JMV based in Cherbourg, France. The boat was lost during the 2008-2009 Vendée Globe following the loss of the keel bulb. The skipper Jean Le Cam was rescued by fellow competitor Vincent Riou.

== Racing results ==
Pos	Year	Race	Class	Boat name	Skipper	Notes	Ref
Round the world races
DNF	2008	2008–2009 Vendée Globe	IMOCA 60	VM Matériaux (2)	Jean Le Cam (FRA)	Boat Lost	
2 / 20	2004	2004–2005 Vendée Globe	IMOCA 60	Bonduelle 2	Jean Le Cam (FRA)	87d 17h	
Transatlantic Races
4 / 17	2007	Transat Jacques Vabre	IMOCA 60	VM Matériaux (2)	Jean Le Cam (FRA); Gildas Morvan (FRA)	17d 07h 50m	
3 / 12	2005	Transat Jacques Vabre	IMOCA 60	Bonduelle 2	Jean Le Cam (FRA); Kito de Pavant (FRA)		
Other Races
3 / 11	2007	Calais Round Britain Race	IMOCA 60	VM Matériaux	Jean Le Cam (FRA)	9d 16h 16m	

== Gallery ==
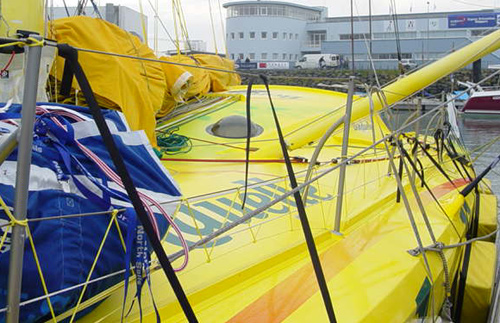

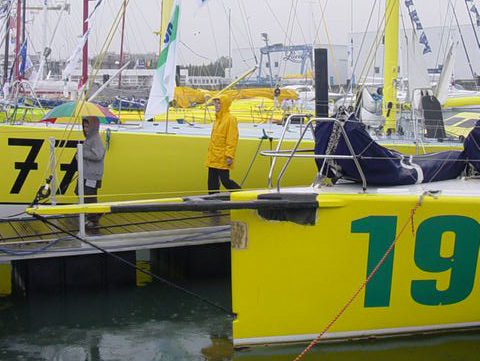

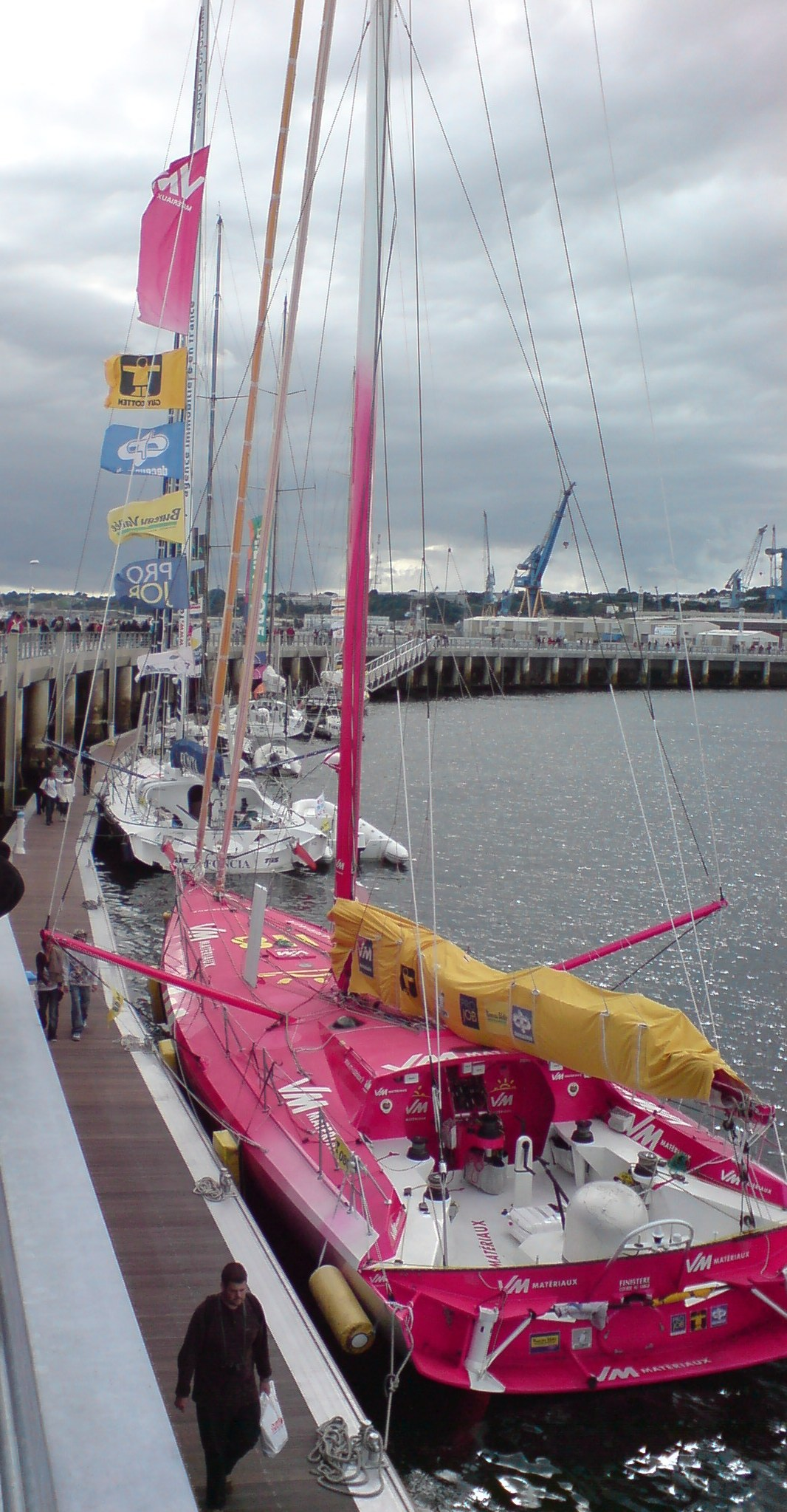

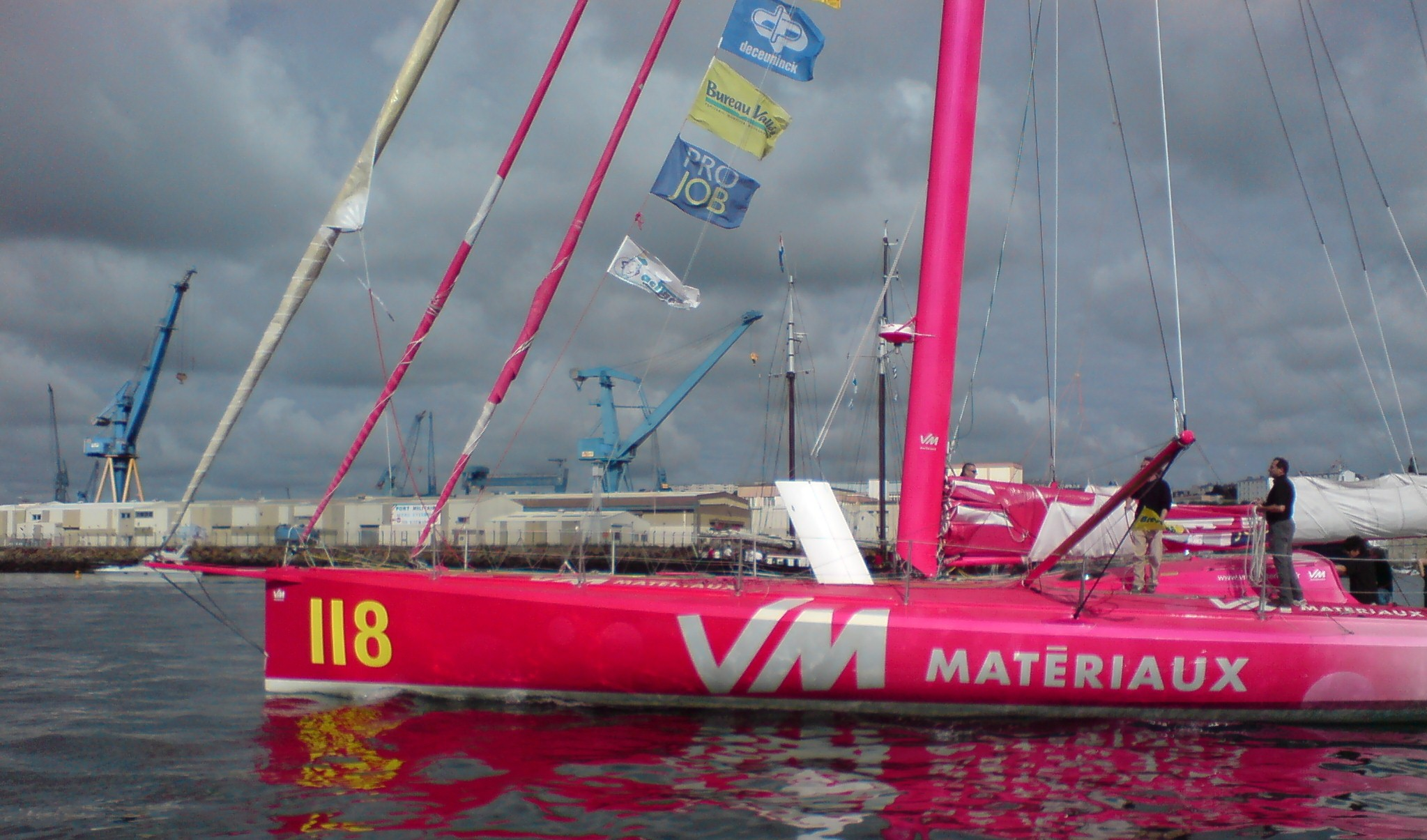

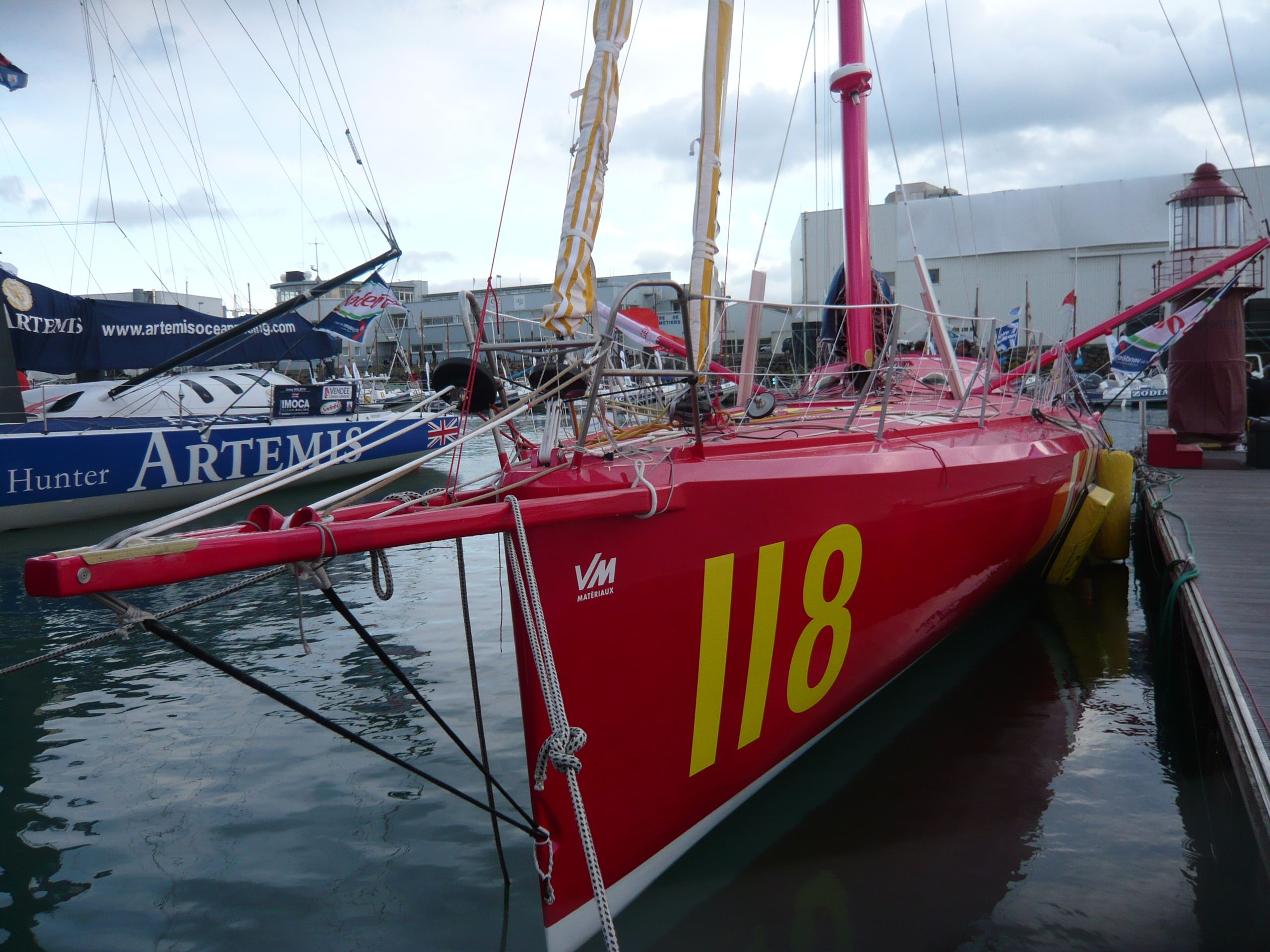

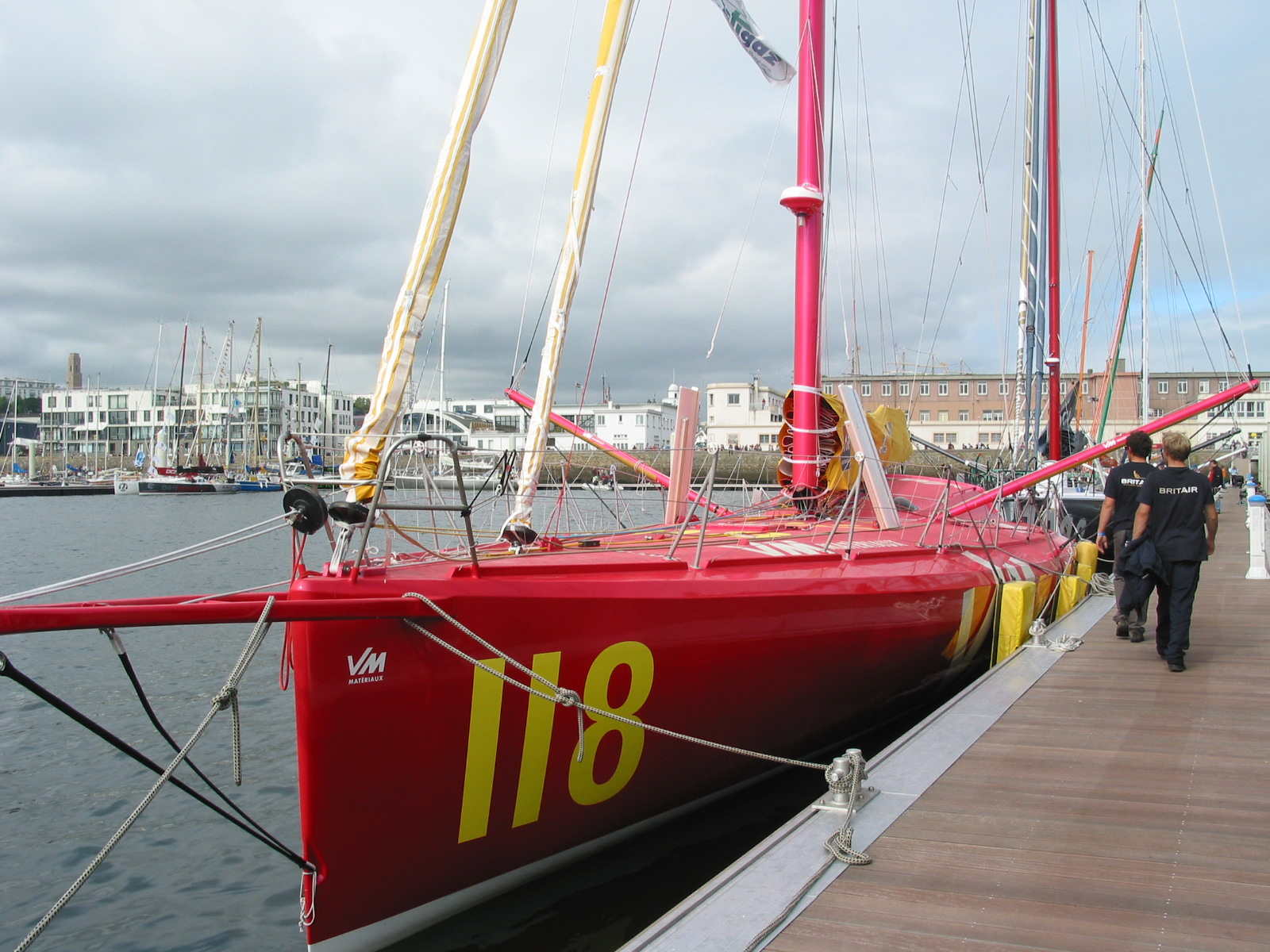

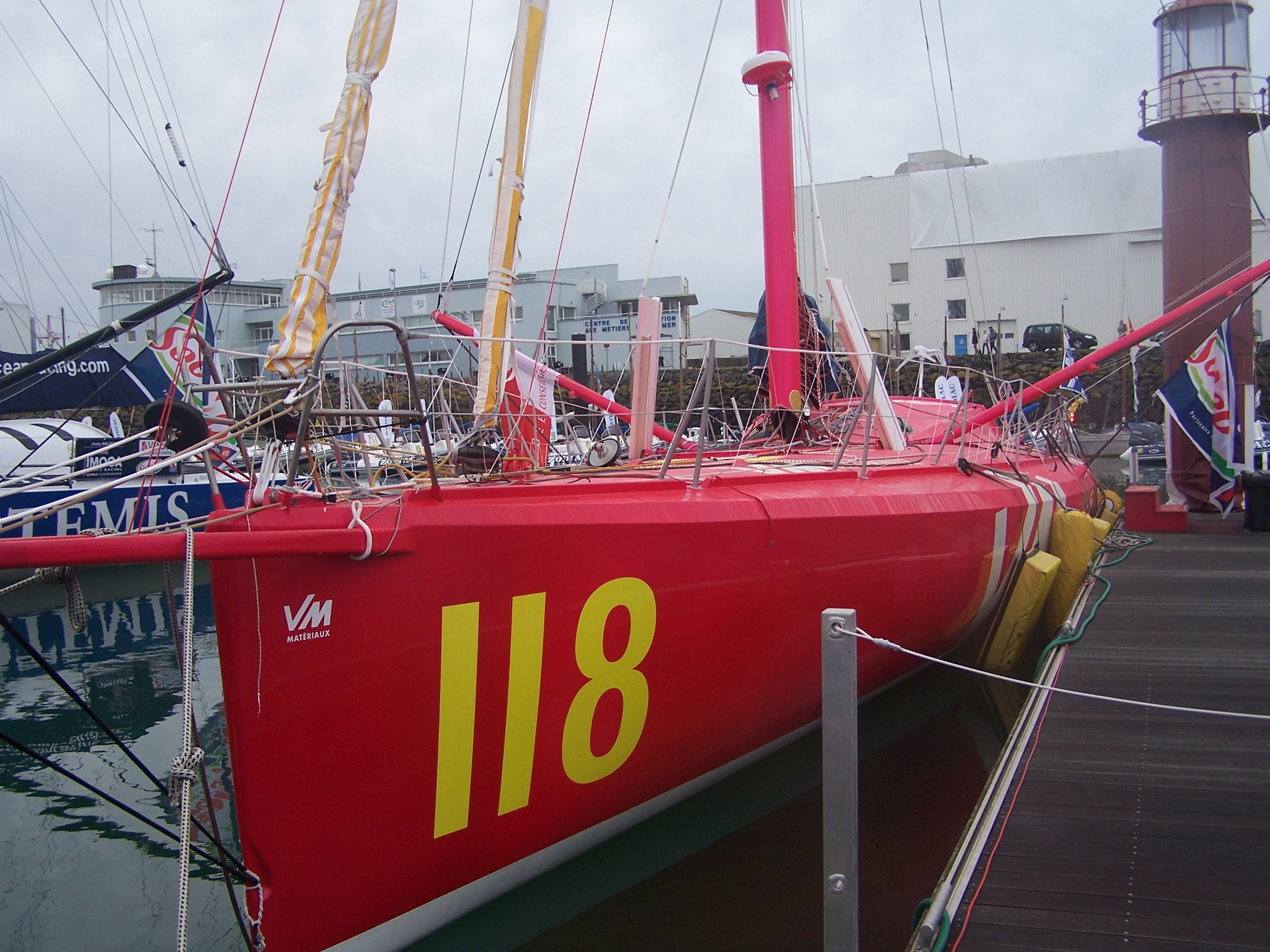

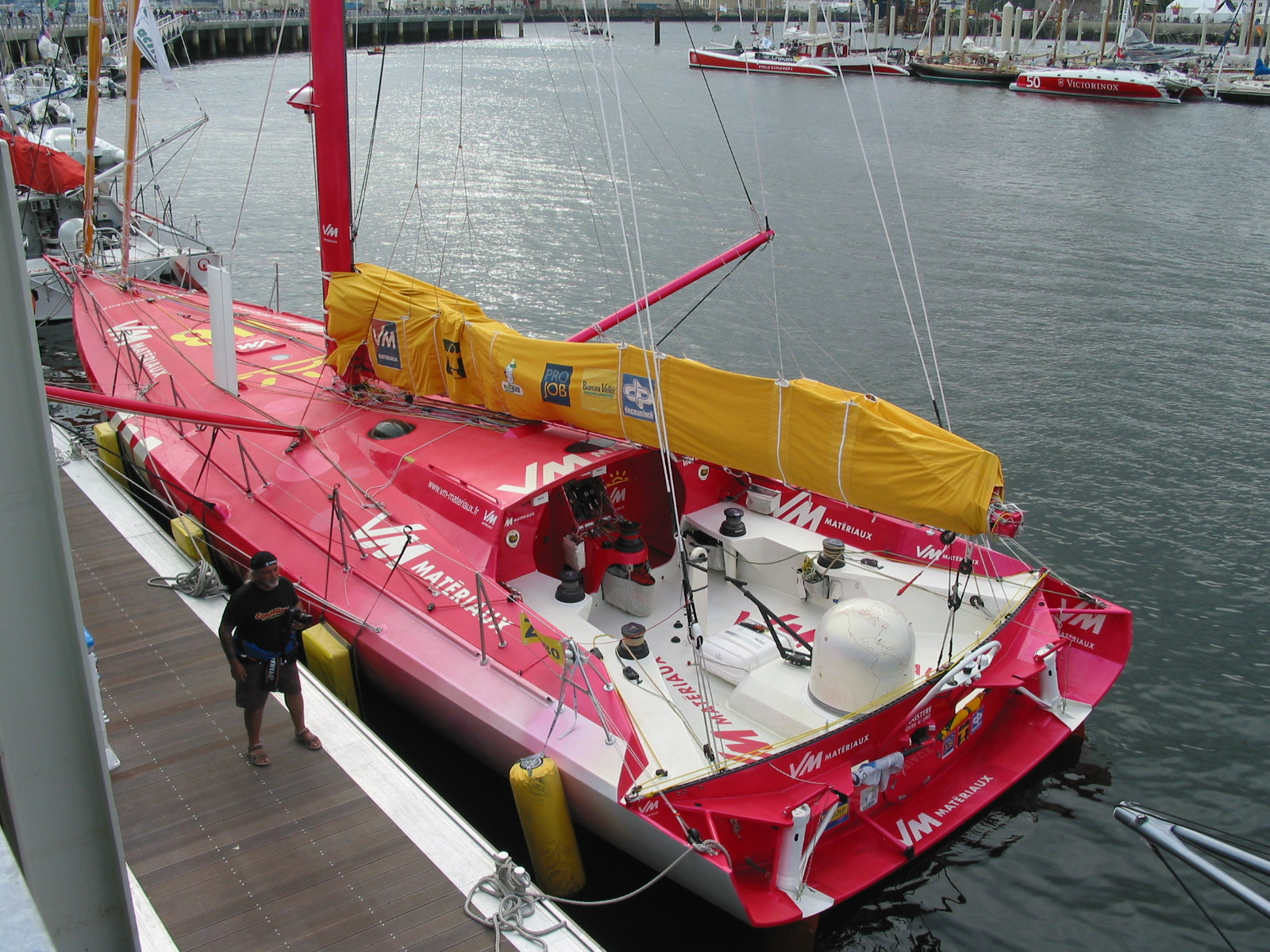

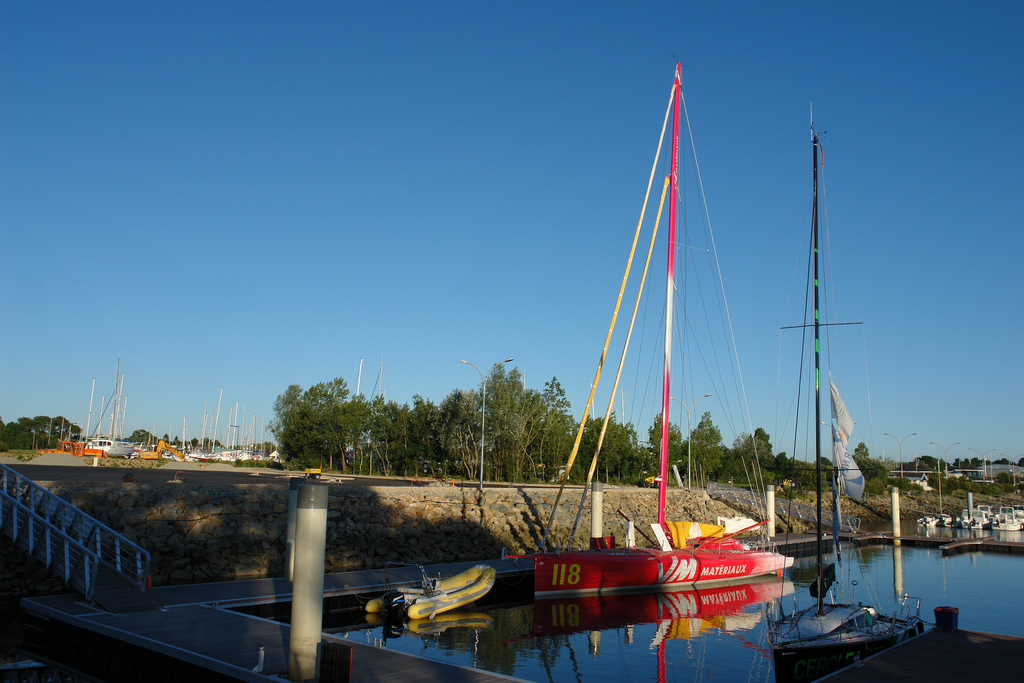
