= Jean Le Cam =

French sailor (born 1959)

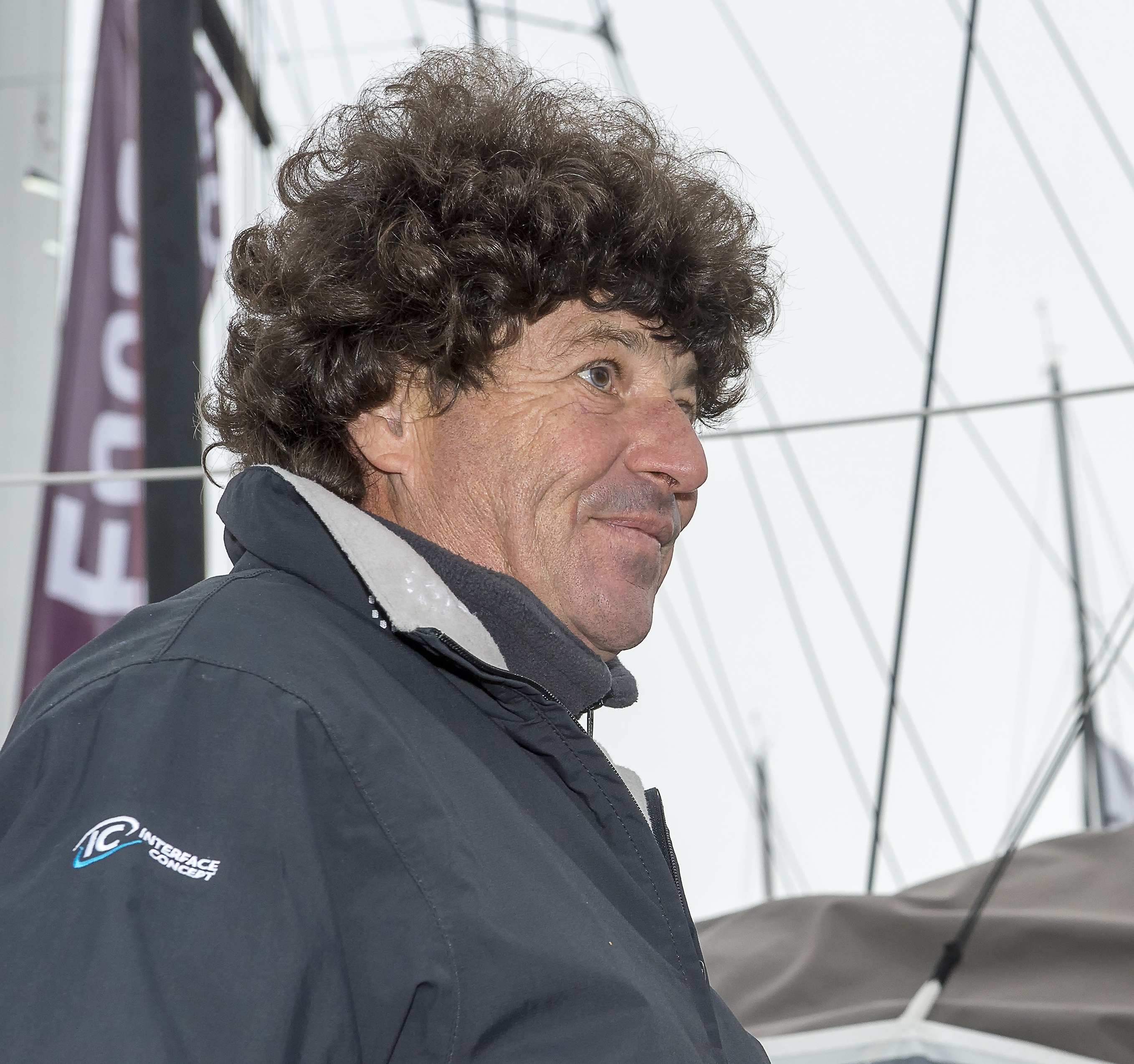
Jean Le Cam

Jean Le Cam (born 27 April 1959 in Quimper, Finistère) is a French sailor.

In 1981–82, he was a crewmember on Euromarché in the Whitbread Round the World Yacht Race.

Le Cam was crewman with Éric Tabarly and Michel Desjoyeaux, and won the Solitaire du Figaro in 1994, 1996, and 1999. He later took an interest in multihull ships.

He finished second in the Vendée Globe 2004-2005, arriving just a few hours after the winner Vincent Riou.

On 6 January 2009, whilst competing in the 2008-2009 edition of the Vendée Globe, he went missing 200 miles from Cape Horn. Vincent Riou, the then skipper of PRB, rescued Jean Le Cam from his upturned IMOCA 60. Le Cam was trapped inside his upturned yacht for 16 hours during which time it was not known for certain if he was safe inside his boat or not.

On 30 November 2020, 16:15 UTC, whilst competing in the Vendée Globe 2020-2021 the roles were reversed when Le Cam conducted a nighttime rescue of fellow competitor and PRB skipper Kevin Escoffier, after Escoffier's yacht broke apart 840 miles southwest of Cape Town, Africa. Once the rescue was complete Le Cam rejoined the race, with Escoffier aboard. Escoffier was later recovered from Le Cam's 'Yes we Cam' yacht by the French Navy on 6 December 2020. Le Cam was awarded a 16hr 15min time compensation for rescuing Kevin Escoffier. Jean Le Cam crossed the finish line on 28 January 2021 at 19:19:55 UTC+1 in 8th place with an elapsed time of 81d 05h 59m 55s. With his time compensation added he is ranked in 4th place and a total time of 80d 13h 44m 55s. It was already his 5th participation in the Vendée Globe.

Le Cam was appointed chevalier of the French Légion d’honneur in July 2021.

== Career highlights ==
Pos	Year	Race	Class	Boat name	time	Notes	Ref
Round the world races
20 / 40	2025	2024–2025 Vendée Globe	IMOCA 60	Tout commence en Finistère - Armor-lux	85d 15h 51m 02s		
4 / 33	2021	2020–2021 Vendée Globe	IMOCA 60	Yes We Cam!	80d 13h 44m 55s		
6 / 29	2017	2016–2017 Vendée Globe	IMOCA 60	Finistère Mer Vent	80d 04h 41m 54s		
1 / 8	2015	Barcelona World Race	IMOCA 60	Chem	84d 05h 50m 25s	with Bernard Stamm (SUI)	
5 / 20	2013	2012–2013 Vendée Globe	IMOCA 60	SynerCiel	88d 00h 12m 58s		
DNF	2009	Barcelona World Race	IMOCA 60	Président, ESP 3	with Bruno Garcia (ESP) |		
RET / 30	2009	2008–2009 Vendée Globe	IMOCA 60	VM Matériaux	Lost keel and capsized rescued by Vincent Riou		
2 / 20	2005	2004–2005 Vendée Globe	IMOCA 60	Bonduelle	87d 17h 20m 08s		
10	1982	Whitbread Round the World Race	Maxi	Euromarché		skippered by Éric Tabarly (FRA)	
Transatlantic Races
32	2023	Retour à la base	IMOCA 60	Tout commence en Finistère - Armor-lux	18d 5h 37m 24s		
13	2019	Transat Jacques Vabre	IMOCA 60	Corum l'épargne (2007)		with Nicolas Troussel (FRA)	
1	2013	Transat Jacques Vabre	IMOCA 60	PRB 5		with Vincent Riou (FRA)	
6	2010	Transat AG2R	Beneteau Figaro 2				
ABN	2009	Transat Jacques Vabre	Multi 50	Actual		with Yves Le Blévec (FRA)	
5	2008	Transat AG2R	Beneteau Figaro 2	Cercle Vert	23d 01h 31m 45s	with Gildas Morvan (FRA)	
4	2007	Transat Jacques Vabre	IMOCA 60	VM Matériaux		with Gildas Morvan (FRA)	
2	2006	Route du Rhum	IMOCA 60	Bonduelle	12d 12h 26m 53s		
3	2005	Transat Jacques Vabre	IMOCA 60	Bonduelle		with Kito de Pavant (FRA)	
ABN	2002	Route du Rhum	IMOCA 60	Bonduelle			
4	2001	Transat Jacques Vabre	IMOCA 60	Bonduelle		with Jacques Caraes (FRA)	
4	1999	Transat Jacques Vabre	IMOCA 60	Sill Entreprise		with Roland Jourdain (FRA)	
5	1996	Transat AG2R	Beneteau Figaro	Guy Cotten - Chattawak	24d 13h 20m 09s	with Florence Arthaud (FRA)	
1	1994	Transat AG2R	Beneteau Figaro	Sill plein fruit - France III	20d 20h 34m 26s	with Roland Jourdain (FRA)	
5	1992	Transat AG2R	Beneteau Figaro	sur Mory		with Dominic Vittet (FRA)	
Other significant races
		Formula 40 World Championship	Formula 40				
