= IMOCA 60 Foncia =

Sailboat

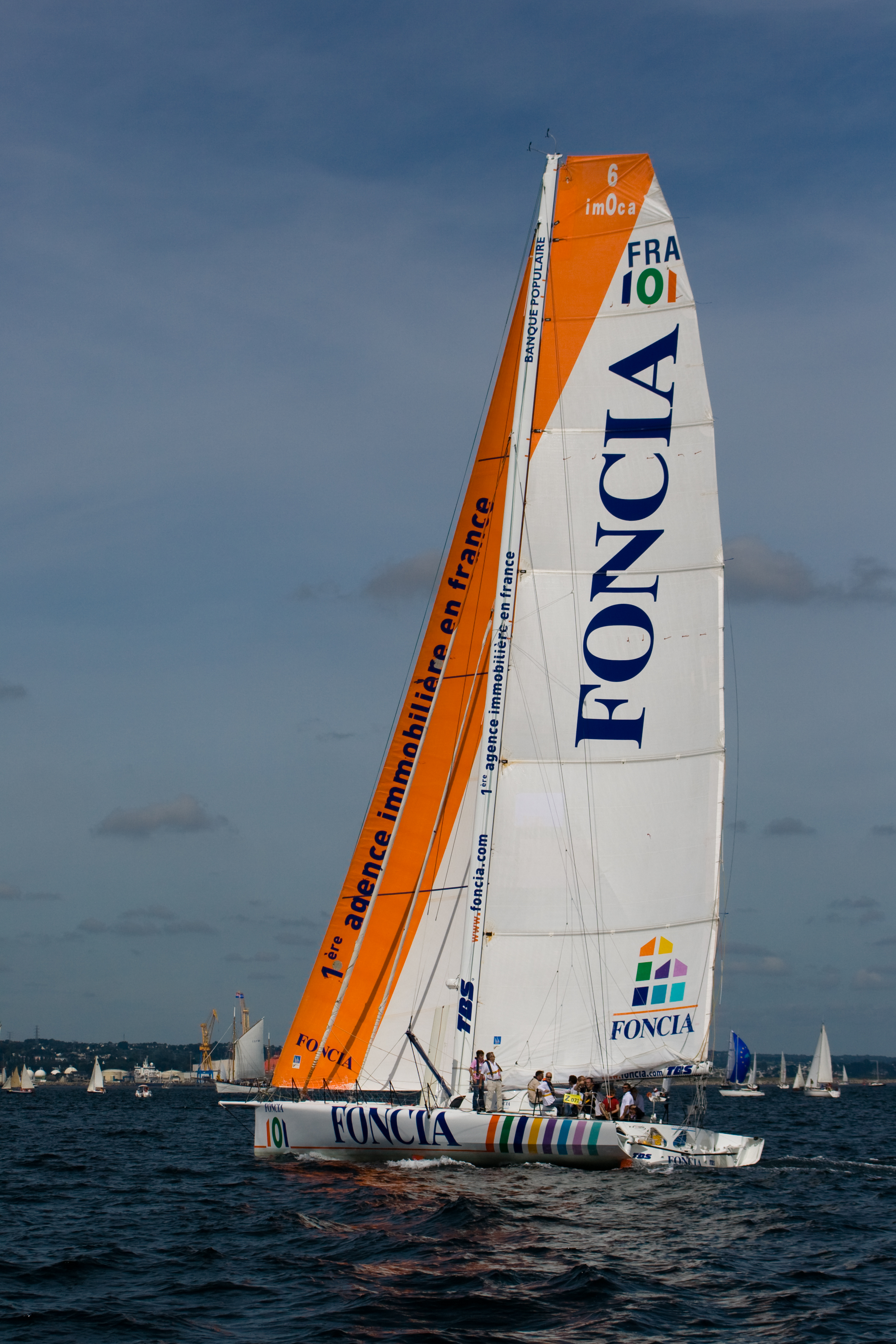

Development
- Designer: Farr Yacht Design, Bruce Farr
- Year: May 2007
- Builder: CDK Technologies

Hull
- Hull weight: Carbon Nomex Sandwich

Hull appendages
- Keel: Canting Keel
- Ballast: Water Ballast
- Rudder: Twin Rudders

Rig
- Rig type: Rotating Mast with Deck Spreaders

Sails
- Upwind sail area: 300 m^{2} (3,200 sq ft)
- Downwind sail area: 620 m^{2} (6,700 sq ft)

Racing
- Class association: IMOCA 60

The IMOCA 60 class yacht FRA 101 - Foncia designed by Farr Yacht Design and launched in the year 2007.

The boat is a sister ship to PRB 3.

== Names and ownership ==
Foncia (2007-2009)

- Skipper: Michel Desjoyeaux (FRA)

TC2

Movistar

Mapfre (2010-2011)

- Skipper: Iker Martinez (ESP) and Xabi Fernandez (FRA)

Maître CoQ (2012-2013)

- Skipper: Jérémie Beyou (FRA)

Mare (2013)

- Skipper: Jörg Riechers (GER)

Cheminées Poujoulat (2014-2015)

- Skipper: Bernard Stamm (SUI) and Jean Le Cam (FRA)

Hubert (2015)

- Skipper: Jean Le Cam (FRA)

Finistère Mer Vent (2016-2017)

- Skipper: Jean Le Cam (FRA)

Corum L'Epargne (2019)

- Skipper: Jean Le Cam (FRA)

Yes We Cam! (2020-2021)

- Skipper: Jean Le Cam (FRA)

Devenir (since 2023)

- Skipper: Violette Dorange (FRA)
- Sail no.: FRA01

== Racing results ==
Pos	Year	Race	Class	Boat name	Skipper	Notes	Ref
Round the world races
25 / 40	2024	2024–2025 Vendée Globe	IMOCA 60	DeVenir	Violette Dorange (FRA)	90d 22h 37m 9s	
4 / 33	2020	2020–2021 Vendée Globe	IMOCA 60	Yes We Cam	Jean Le Cam (FRA)	80d 13h 44m 55s Corrected; 81d 05h 59m 55s Elapsed	
6 / 29	2016	2016–2017 Vendée Globe	IMOCA 60	Finistère Mer Vent, FRA 001	Jean Le Cam (FRA)	80d 04h 41m 54s	
1 / 8	2014	Barcelona World Race	IMOCA 60	Cheminées Poujoulat (5), SUI 1	Jean Le Cam (FRA); Bernard Stamm (SUI)	84d 05h 50s	
DNF	2012	2012–2013 Vendée Globe	IMOCA 60	Maitre Coq	Jérémie Beyou (FRA)		
1 /	2008	2008–2009 Vendée Globe	IMOCA 60	Foncia	Michel Desjoyeaux (FRA)	84d 03h 09m	
Transatlantic Races
13 / 29	2019	Transat Jacques Vabre	IMOCA 60	Corum L'Epargne - FRA 2019	Jean Le Cam (FRA); Nicolas Troussel (FRA)	14d 23h 26s	
4 / 14	2009	Transat Jacques Vabre	IMOCA 60	Foncia	Michel Desjoyeaux (FRA); Jérémie Beyou (FRA)	17d 08h 44s	
1 / 17	2007	Transat Jacques Vabre	IMOCA 60	Foncia	Michel Desjoyeaux (FRA); Emmanuel Le Borgne (FRA)	17d 02h 37s	
3 / 15	2007	Transat B to B	IMOCA 60	Foncia	Michel Desjoyeaux (FRA)	14j13h43'	
Other Races

== Gallery ==
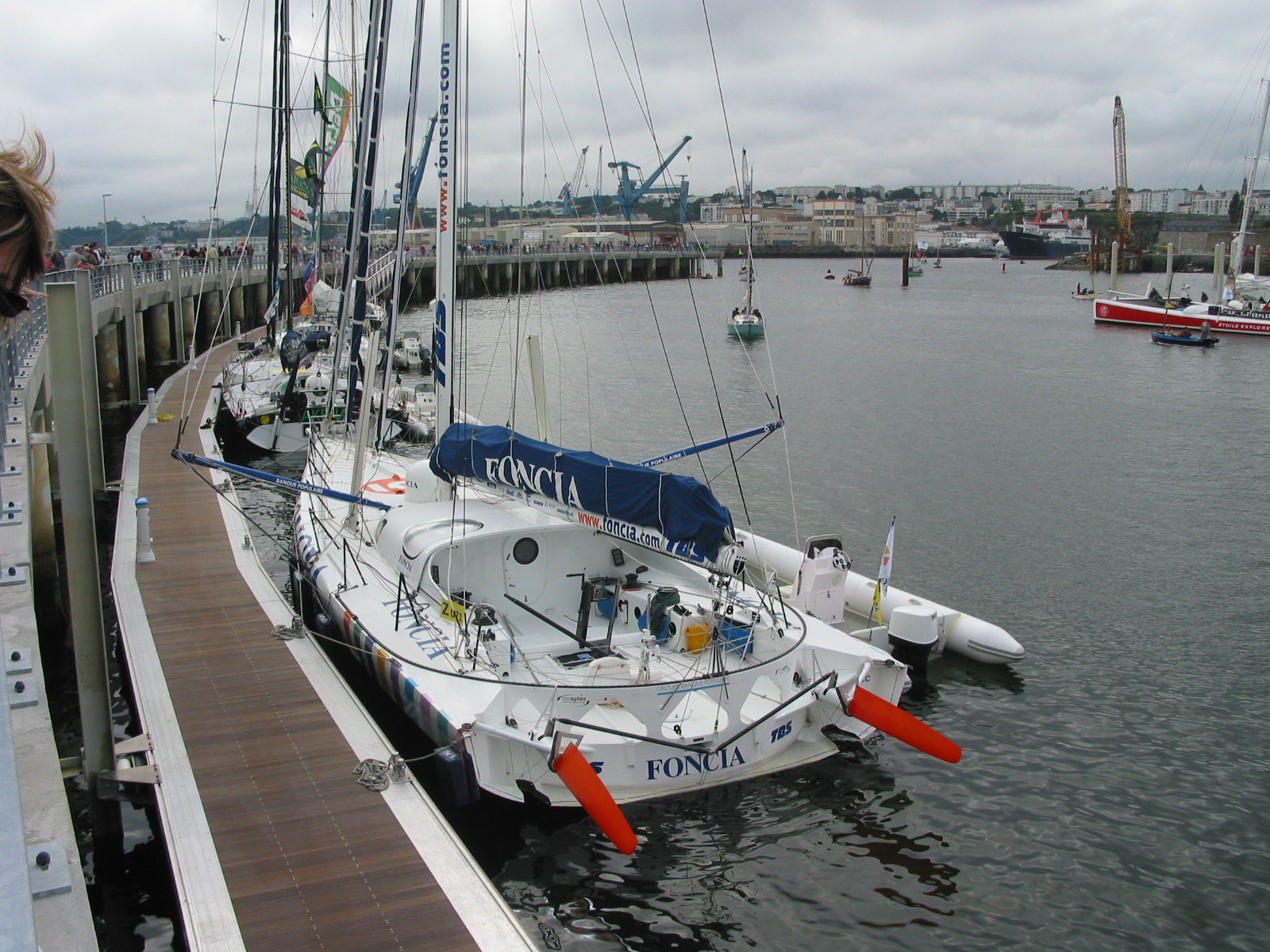

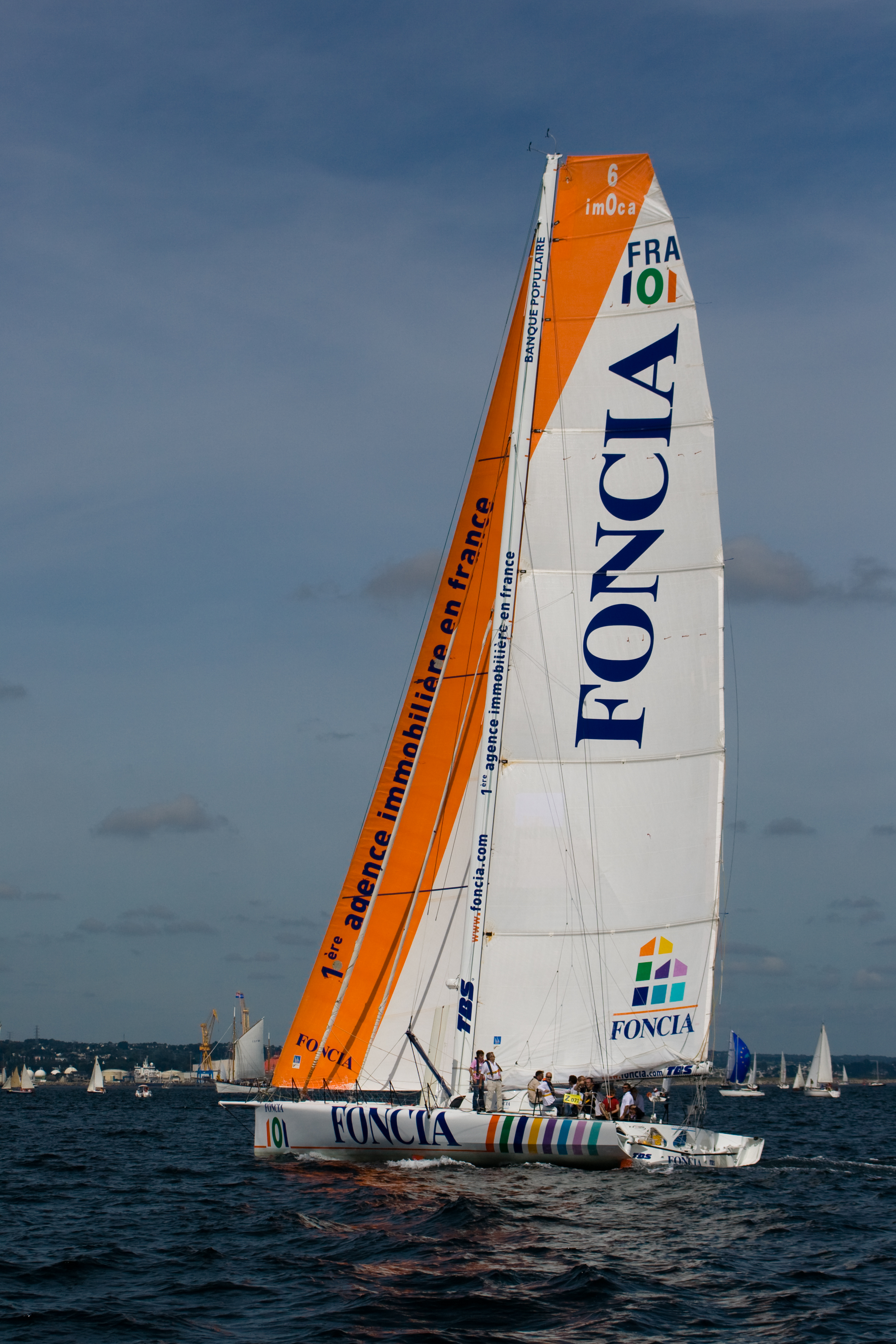

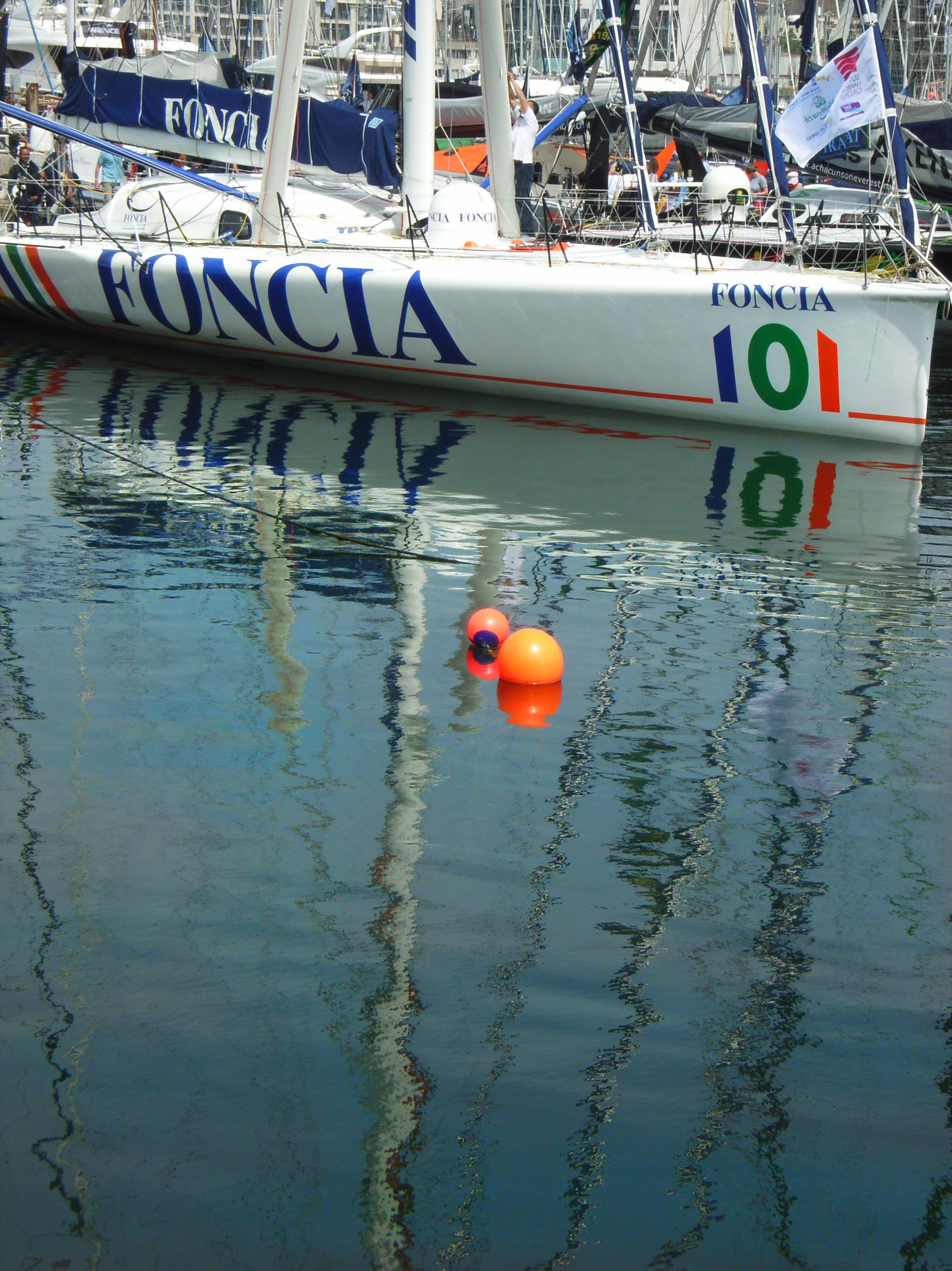

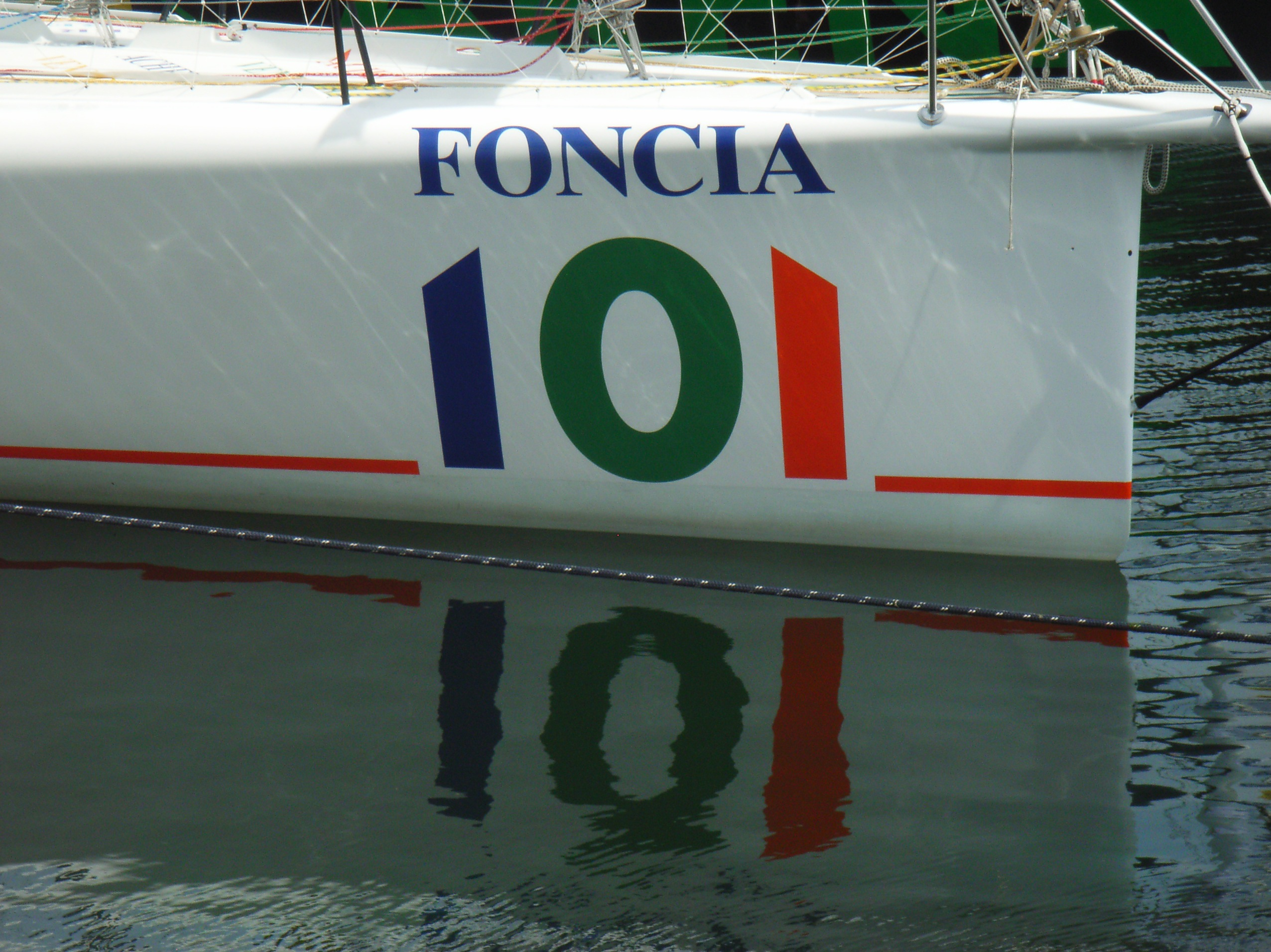

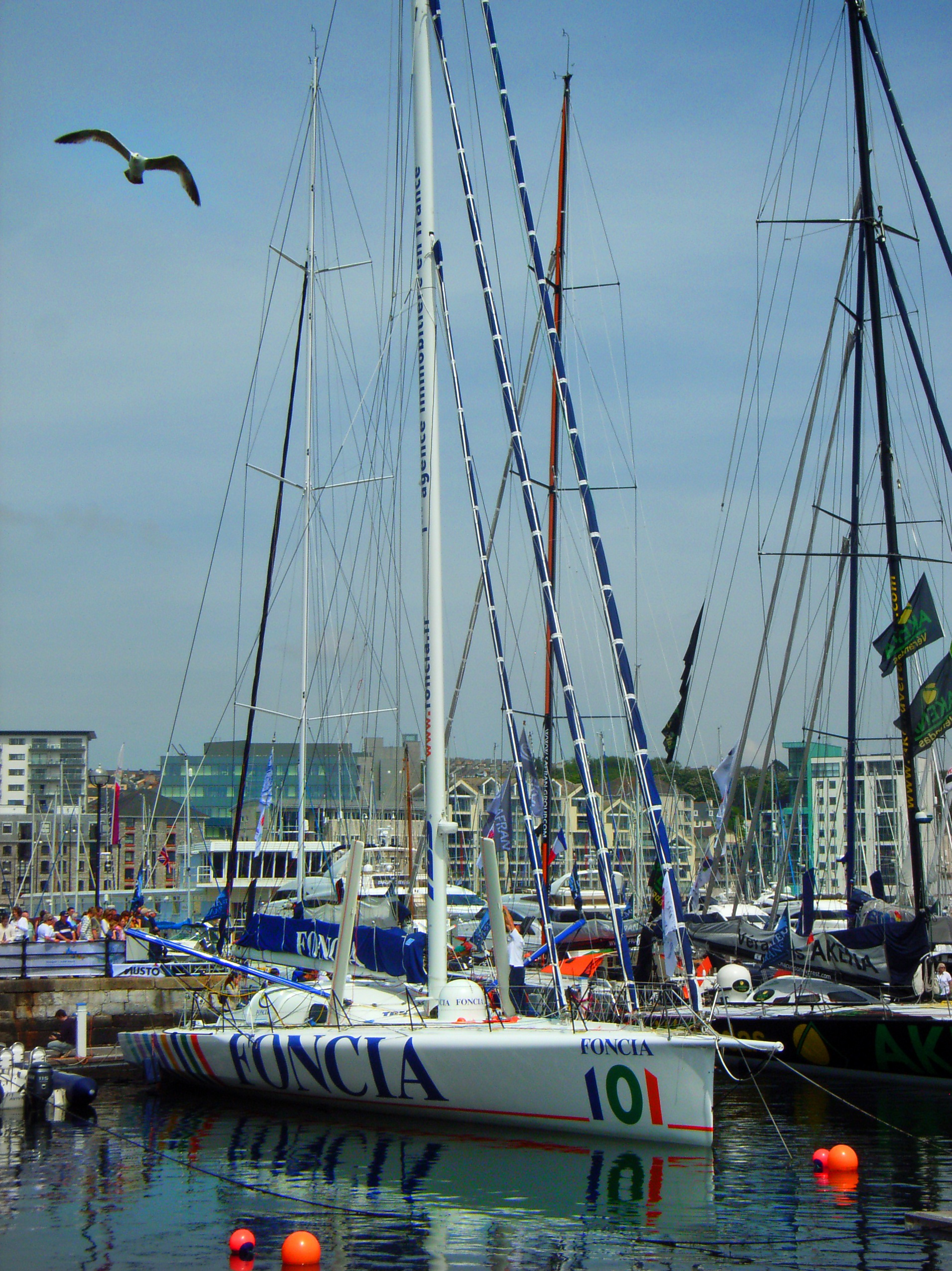

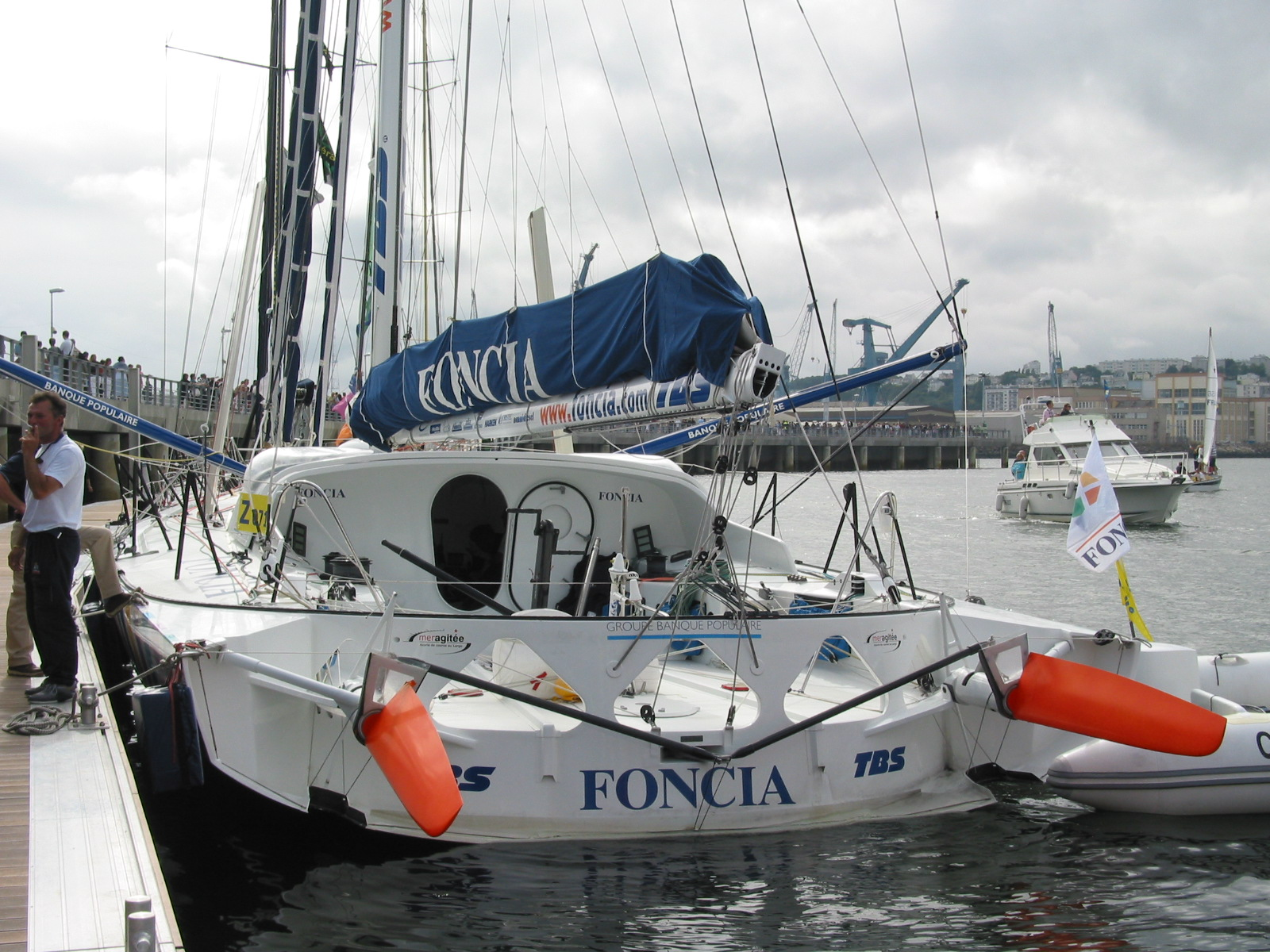

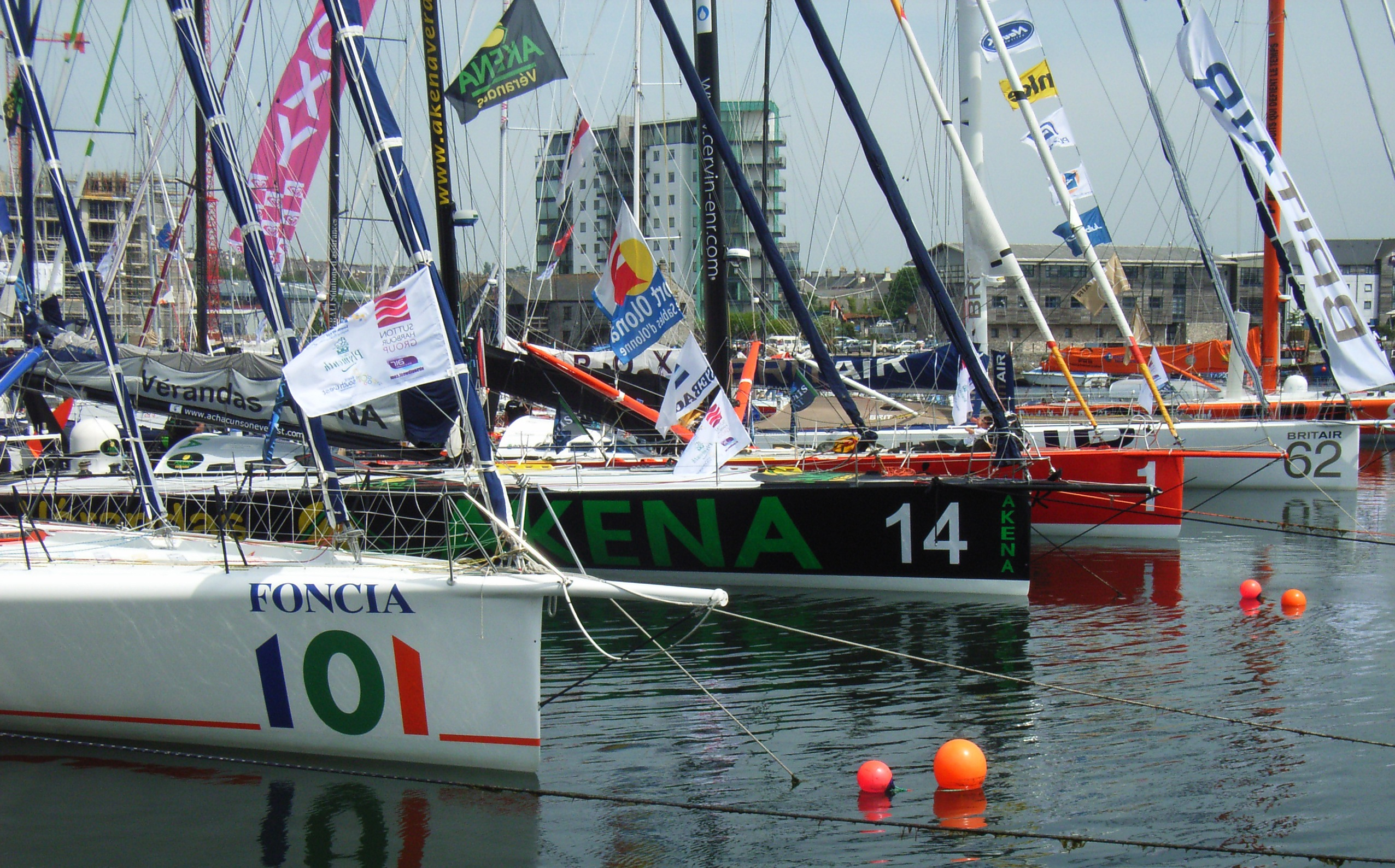

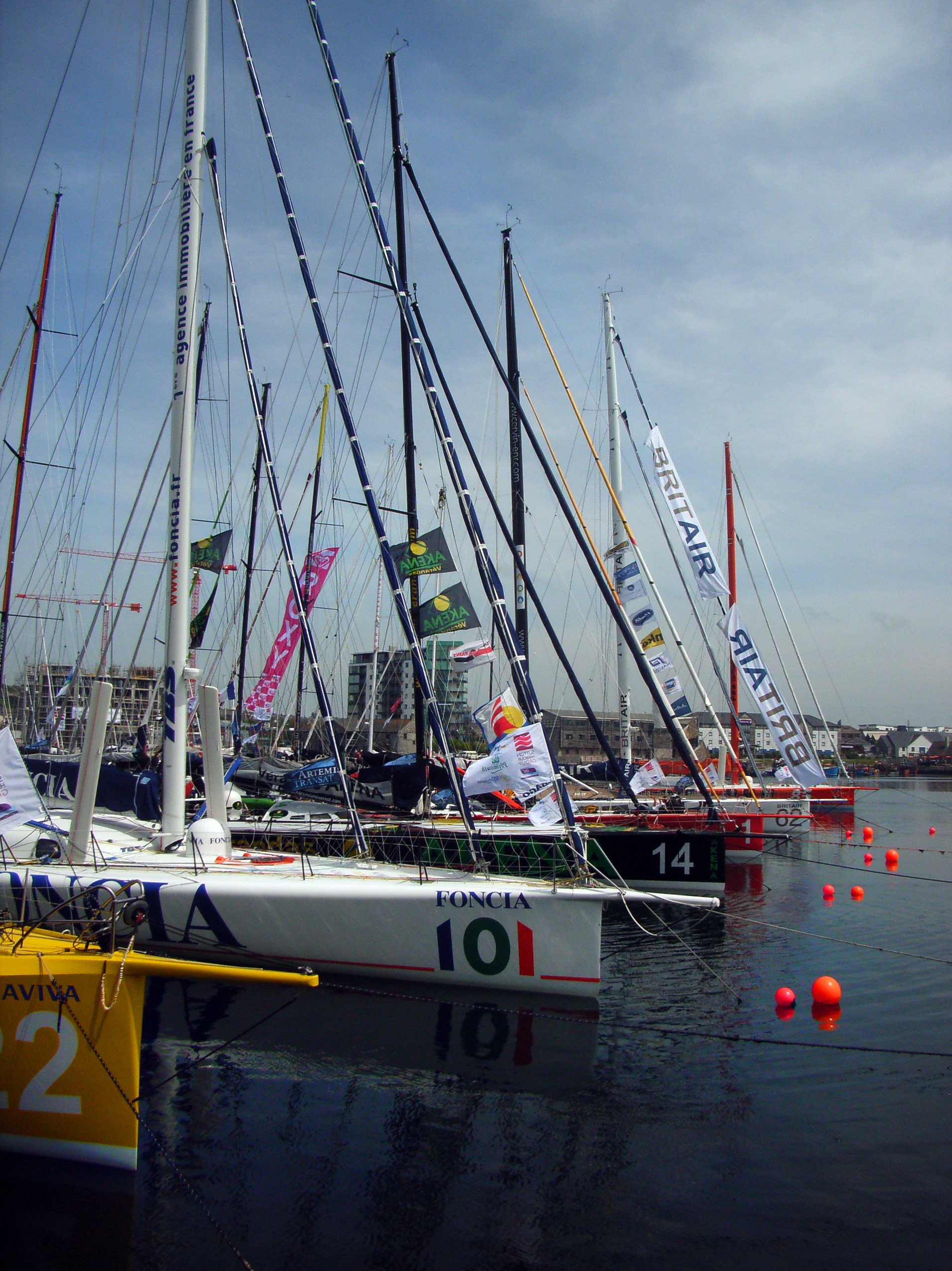

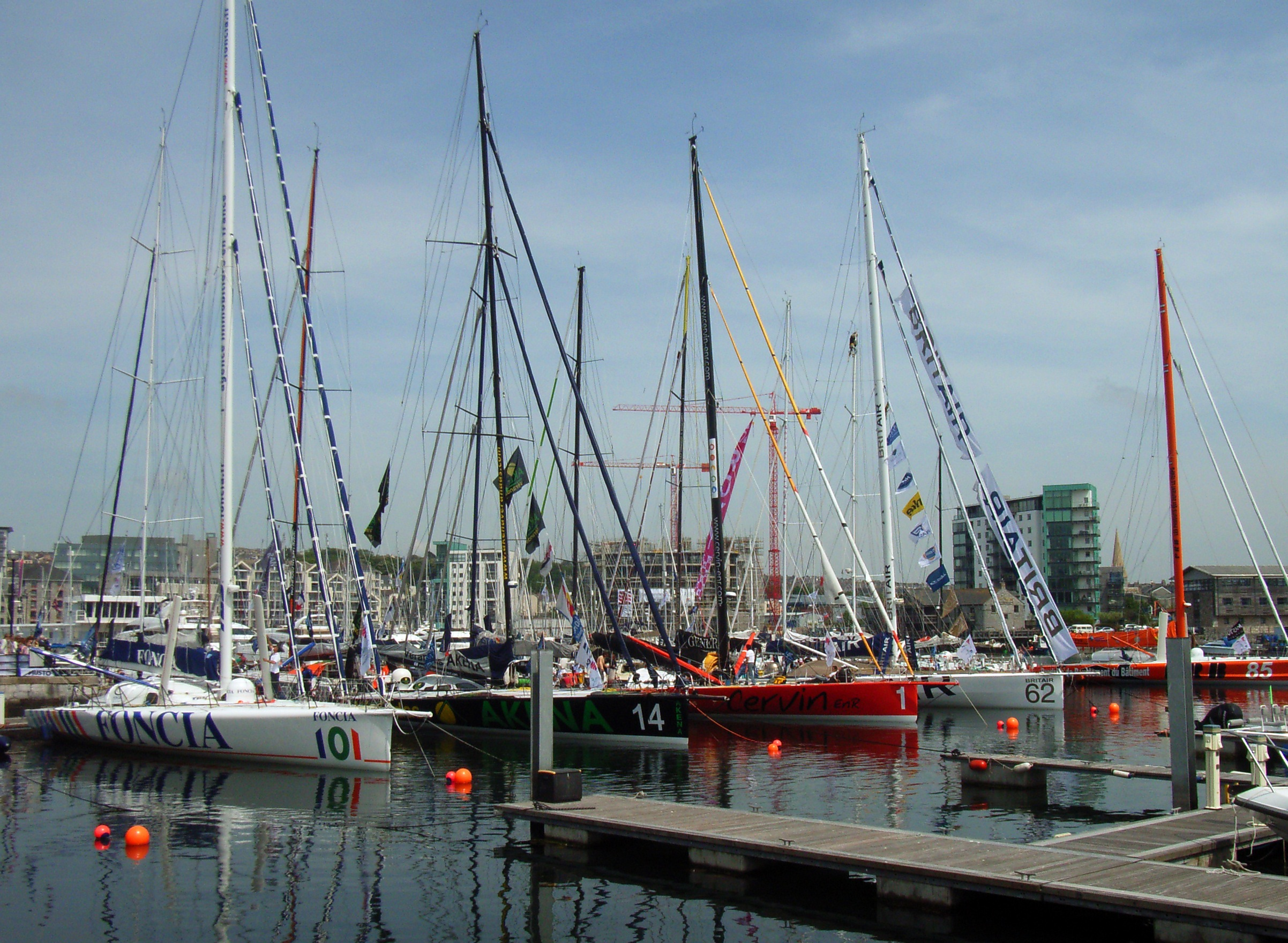

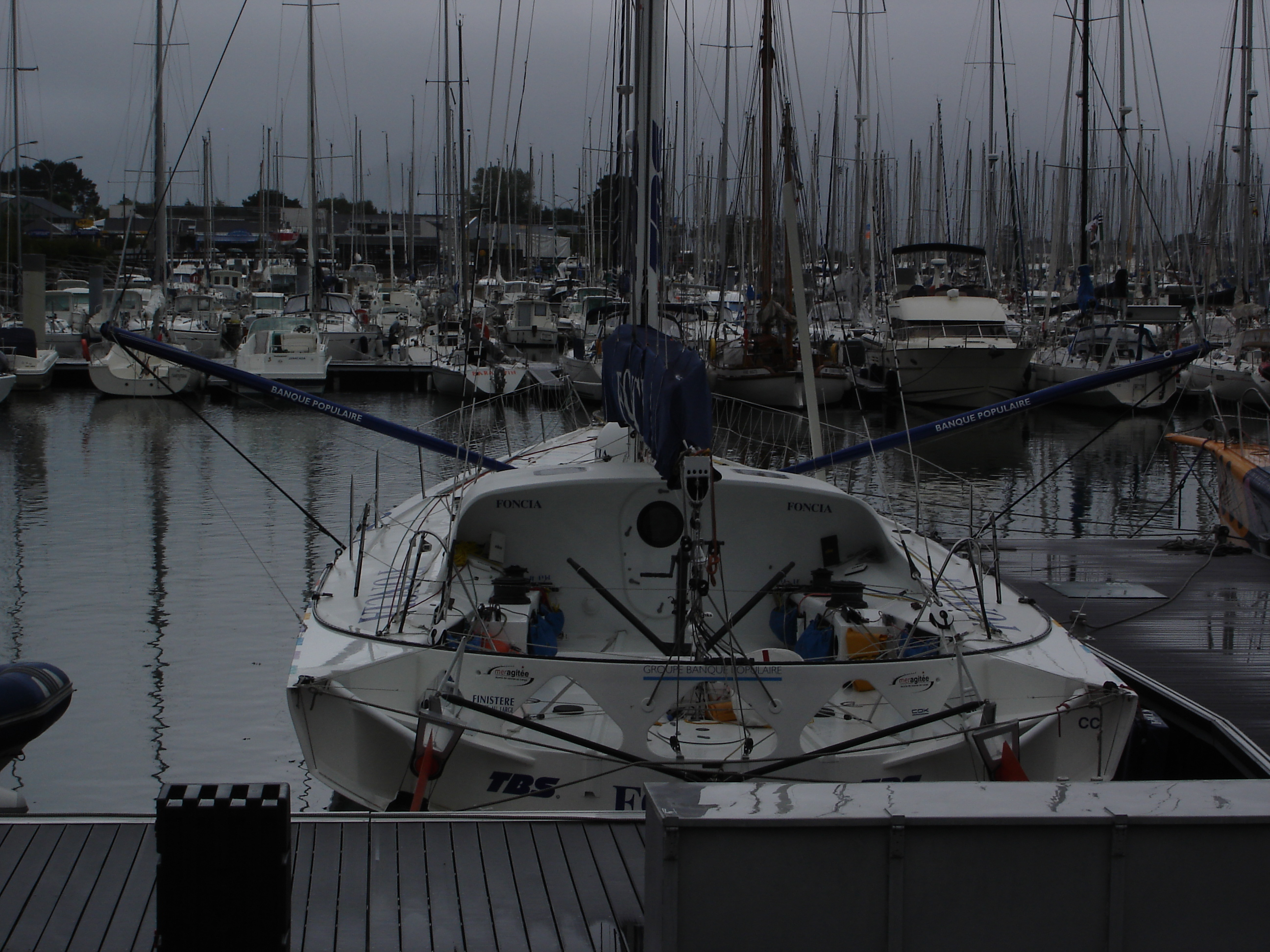

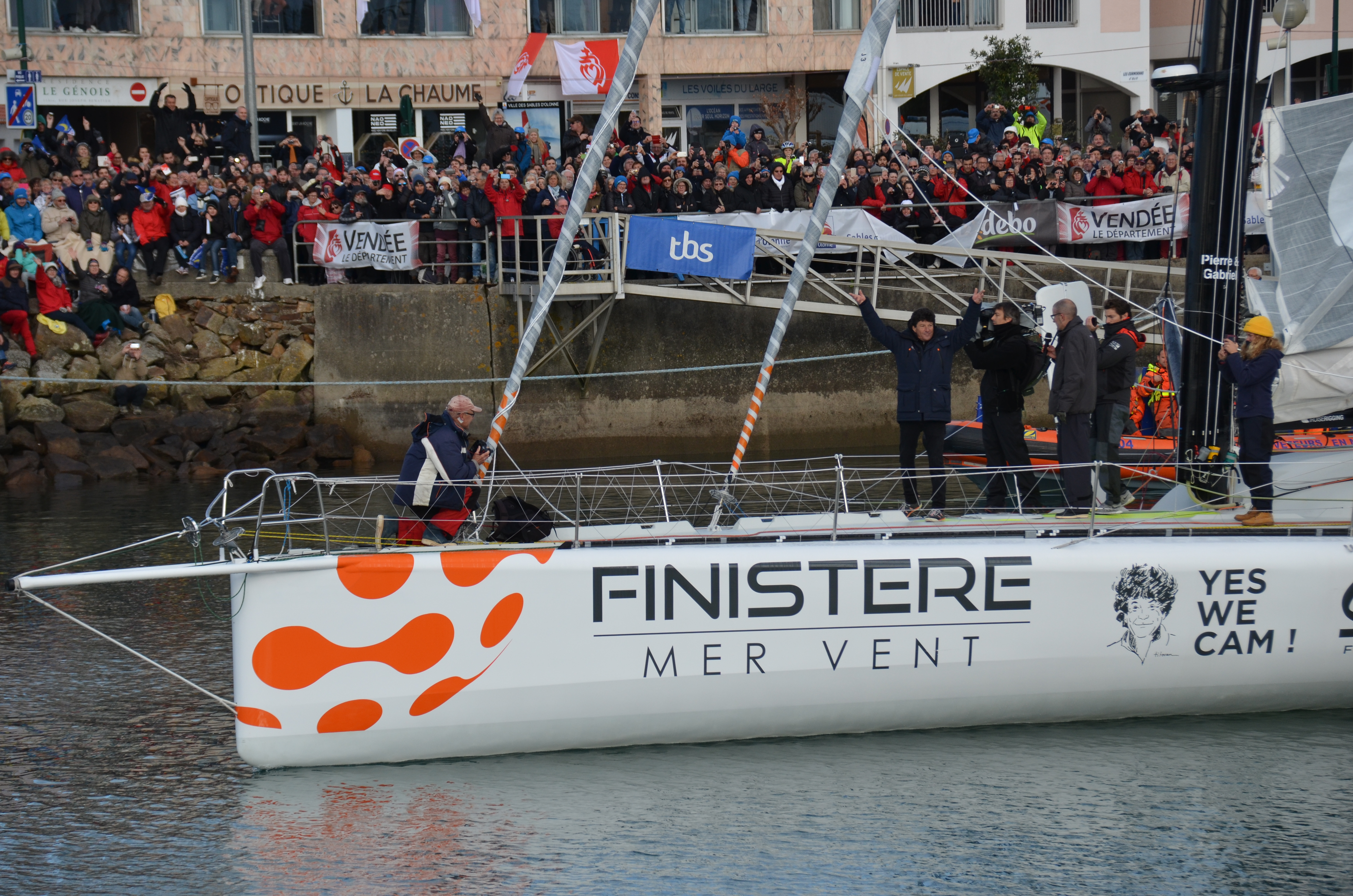
