= IMOCA 60 Groupe Bel =

Sailboat

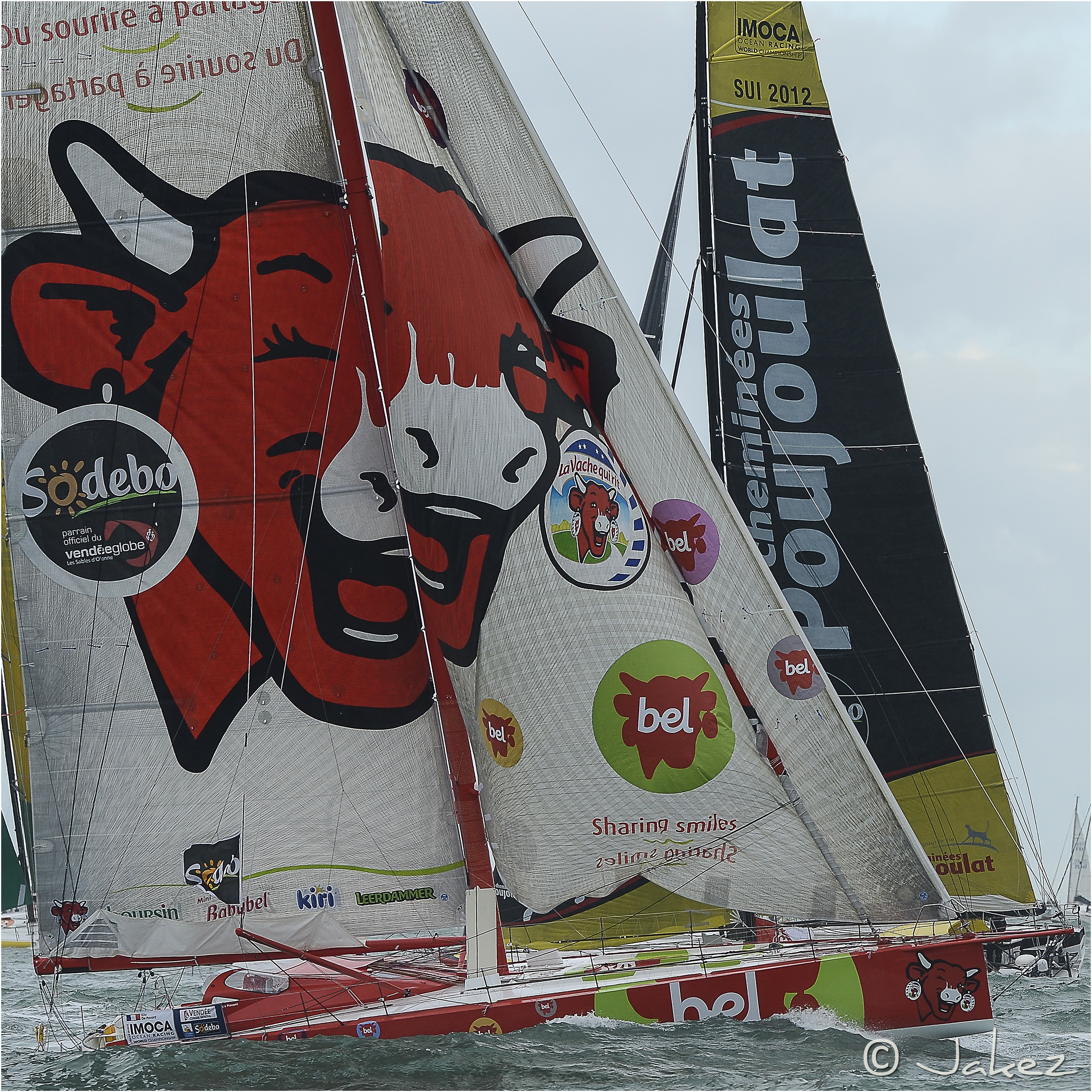

Development
- Designer: VPLP Design, Guillaume Verdier
- Builder: Indiana Yachting (ITA)

The IMOCA 60 class racing yacht Groupe Bel was launched in 2007 to a design by VPLP and Guillaume Verdier and constructed by Indiana Yachting in Italy.

== Names and ownership ==
Groupe Bel (2007-2013)

- Skipper: Kito de Pavant

Imagine (2014)

- Skipper: Armel Tripon

For Humble Heroes (2014)

- Skipper: Armel Tripon

Le Souffle du Nord (2016-2017)

- Skipper: Thomas Ruyant

Kilcullen Team Irlande (2017)

- Skipper: Enda O’Coineen

V and B - Mayenne (2018-2021)

- Skipper: Maxime Sorel

Imagine (2022-2023)

- Skipper: Conrad Colman

Mail Boxes Etc. (since 2023)

- Skipper: Conrad Colman
- Sail no.: NZL 64

== Racing results ==
Pos	Year	Race	Class	Boat name	Skipper	Notes	Ref
Round the world races
10 / 33	2020	2020–2021 Vendée Globe	IMOCA 60	V and B Mayenne, FRA 53	Maxime Sorel (FRA)	82d 14h 30m	
DNF	2016	2016–2017 Vendée Globe	IMOCA 60	Le Souffle du Nord: Le Projet Imagine, FRA 121	Thomas Ruyant (FRA)		
DNF	2012	2012–2013 Vendée Globe	IMOCA 60	Groupe Bel	Kito De Pavant (FRA)	Collision	
DNF	2011	Barcelona World Race	IMOCA 60	Groupe Bel	Kito De Pavant (FRA); Sébastien Audigane (FRA)	Keel Damage	
DNF	2009	2008–2009 Vendée Globe	IMOCA 60	Groupe Bel	Kito De Pavant (FRA)		
Transatlantic Races
2 / 15	2007	Transat B to B	IMOCA 60	Groupe Bel	Kito De Pavant (FRA)	14j12h23'Bahia-Bretagne	
6 / 17	2007	Transat Jacques Vabre	IMOCA 60	Groupe Bel	Sebastien Col (FRA); Kito De Pavant (FRA)	17d 17h44	
Other Races
