= Kito de Pavant =

French offshore sailor and navigator

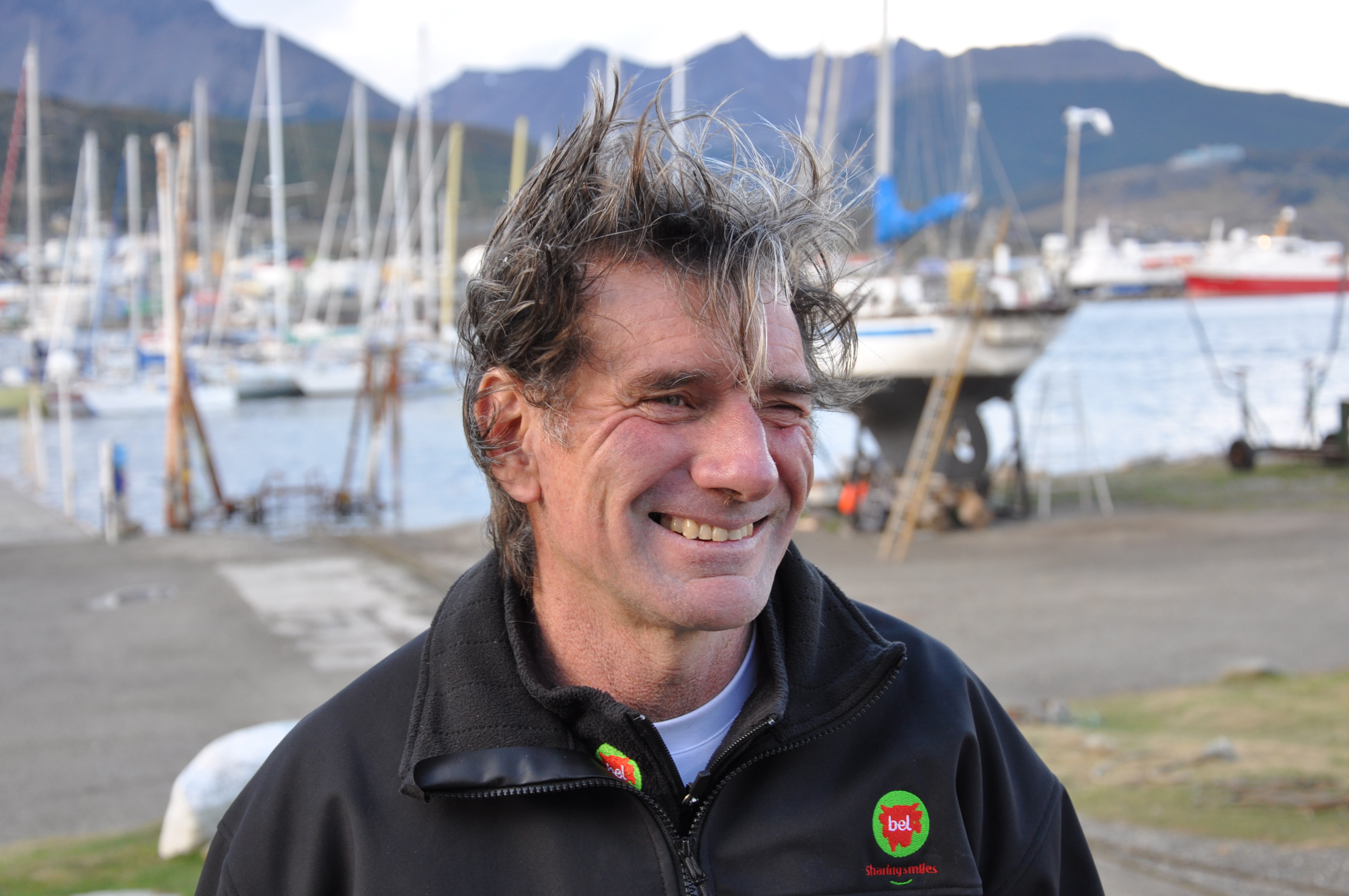

Personal information
- Full name: Christophe Fourcault de Pavant
- Nationality: French
- Born: 23 February 1961 (age 65) Saint-Pardoux-la-Rivière

Sailing career
- Sport: Sailing

Christophe Fourcault de Pavant (born 23 February 1961 in Saint-Pardoux-la-Rivière in the Dordogne region), also known as Kito de Pavant, is a French sailor.

== Vendee Globe attempts ==
He has not been lucky in the Vendee Globe having started three times and never finishing.

In the 2008-2009 Vendée Globe the day after the start (28 hours), his mast was broken in a storm in the Bay of Biscay and he abandoned the race.

In the 2012-2013 Vendée Globe on the same boat he hit a trawler on the third day (43 hours) of the race and retired unaided to the Cascais.

Thing got even worse in 2016-2017 Vendée Globe when he was forced to abandon his boat Bastide Otio following a collision with a sperm whale.

== Key results ==
Year	Pos.	Event	Class	Boat name	Notes	Ref.
Round the world races
2016	RET	2016-2017 Vendee Globe	IMOCA 60	Bastide Otio (1) / FRA 17	Day 30: Damaged keel – North of Crozet Islands	
2012	RET	2012-2013 Vendee Globe	IMOCA 60	Groupe Bel	Day 3 Collision with a fishing boat	
2008	RET	2008-2009 Vendee Globe	IMOCA 60	Groupe Bel	Day 2 Mast Failure	
Trans-Oceanic Races
2019	7	Transat Jacques Vabre	Class40	Made In Midi	with Achille NEBOUT; 18d 22h 56mn 52sec	
2018	5	Route du Rhum	Class40	Made In Midi	17d 4h 49m 47s	
2017	5	Transat Jacques Vabre	IMOCA 60	Bastide Otio (2) / FRA 17	with Yannick Bestaven	
2015	RET	Transat Jacques Vabre	IMOCA 60	Bastide Otio (1) / FRA 30	with Yann Regniau	
2014	3	Route du Rhum	Class40	Otio-Bastide Medical	17d 5h 7m 3s	
2014	12	Transat AG2R	Beneteau Figaro	MADE IN MIDI	with Gwenael Gbick	
2013	2	Transat Jacques Vabre	Multi 50	Actual	with Yves Le Blevec	
2011	5	Transat Jacques Vabre	IMOCA 60	Groupe Bel	with Yann Regniau	
2010	24	Transat AG2R	Beneteau Figaro	Groupe Bel	with Sébastien AUDIGANE	
2009	2	Transat Jacques Vabre	IMOCA 60	Groupe Bel	with François Gabart	
2007	6	Transat Jacques Vabre	IMOCA 60	Groupe Bel	with Sébastien Col	
2006	1	Transat AG2R	Beneteau Figaro	Groupe Bel	with Pietro d'Ali	
2005	3	Transat Jacques Vabre	IMOCA 60	Bonduelle	with Jean Le Cam	
2004	6	Transat AG2R	Beneteau Figaro	DELTA DORE	with Jérémie Beyou	
2001	5	Transat Jacques Vabre	IMOCA 60	voila.fr	with Bernard Gallay	
2000	1	Transat AG2R	Beneteau Figaro	LES TORTUES A CARAPACES MOLLES	with G. RABAUD	
Other Races
2013	4	Rolex Fastnet Race	Class40	Lord Jiminy	with Bruno Jourdren, Jacques Caras, Thomas Ruyant	
2010	9	Solitaire du Figaro	Bénéteau Figaro	Group Bel		
2008	4	1000 MILLES BRITTANY FERRIES (Saint Malo - Plymouth - Santander - Roscoff - Saint Malo)	Class40	Lord Jiminy - Lepal.com	with Bruno Jourdren	
2007	2	Tour de France à la voile	Farr 30		Crewed Event	
2006	10	Solitaire du Figaro	Bénéteau Figaro	Groupe Bel		
2005	3	Solitaire du Figaro	Bénéteau Figaro	Group Bel		
2003	1	Tour de France à la voile	Farr 30	CapSport	Crewed Event	
2002	1	Solitaire du Figaro	Bénéteau Figaro			

== Gallery ==
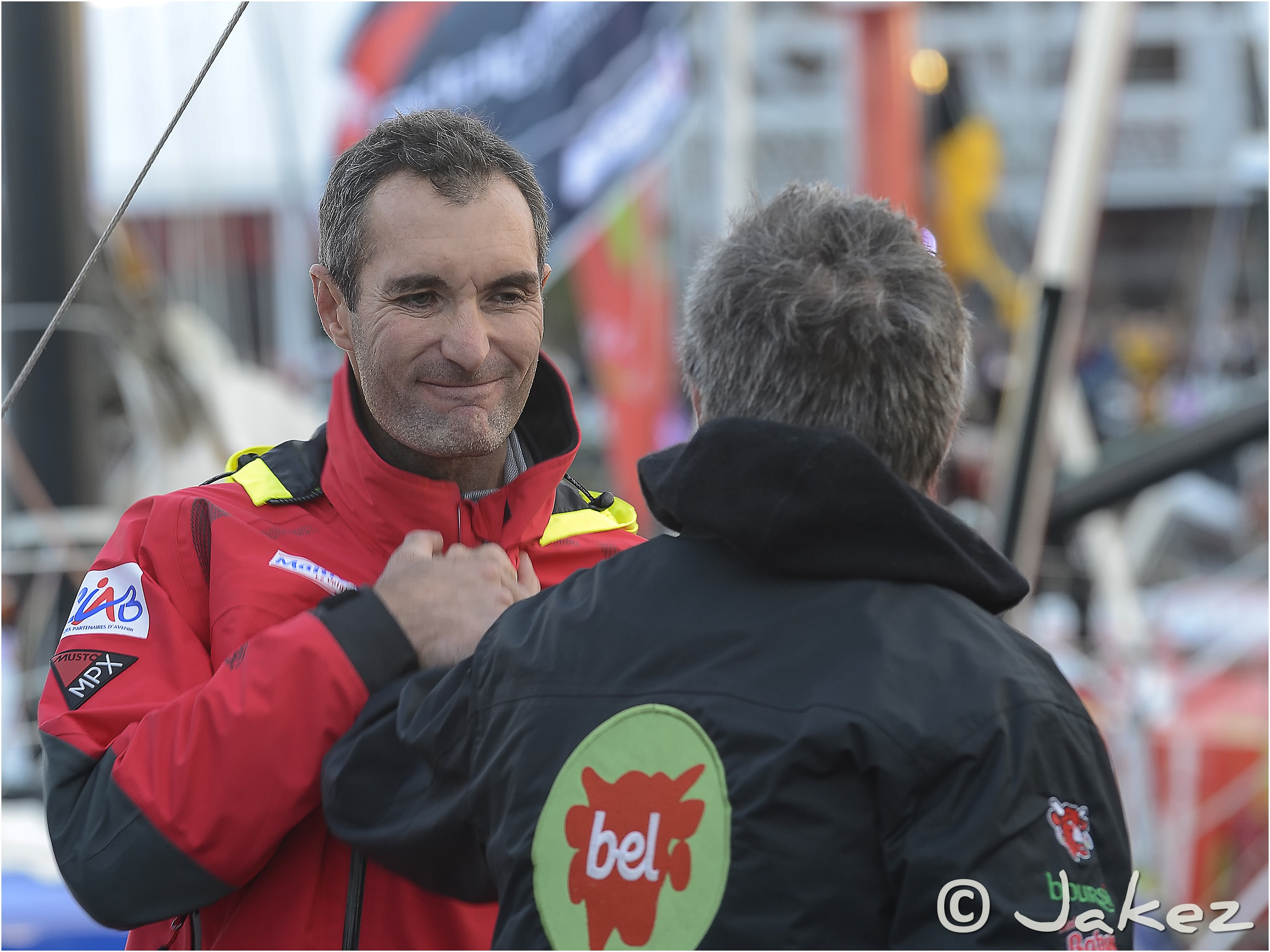

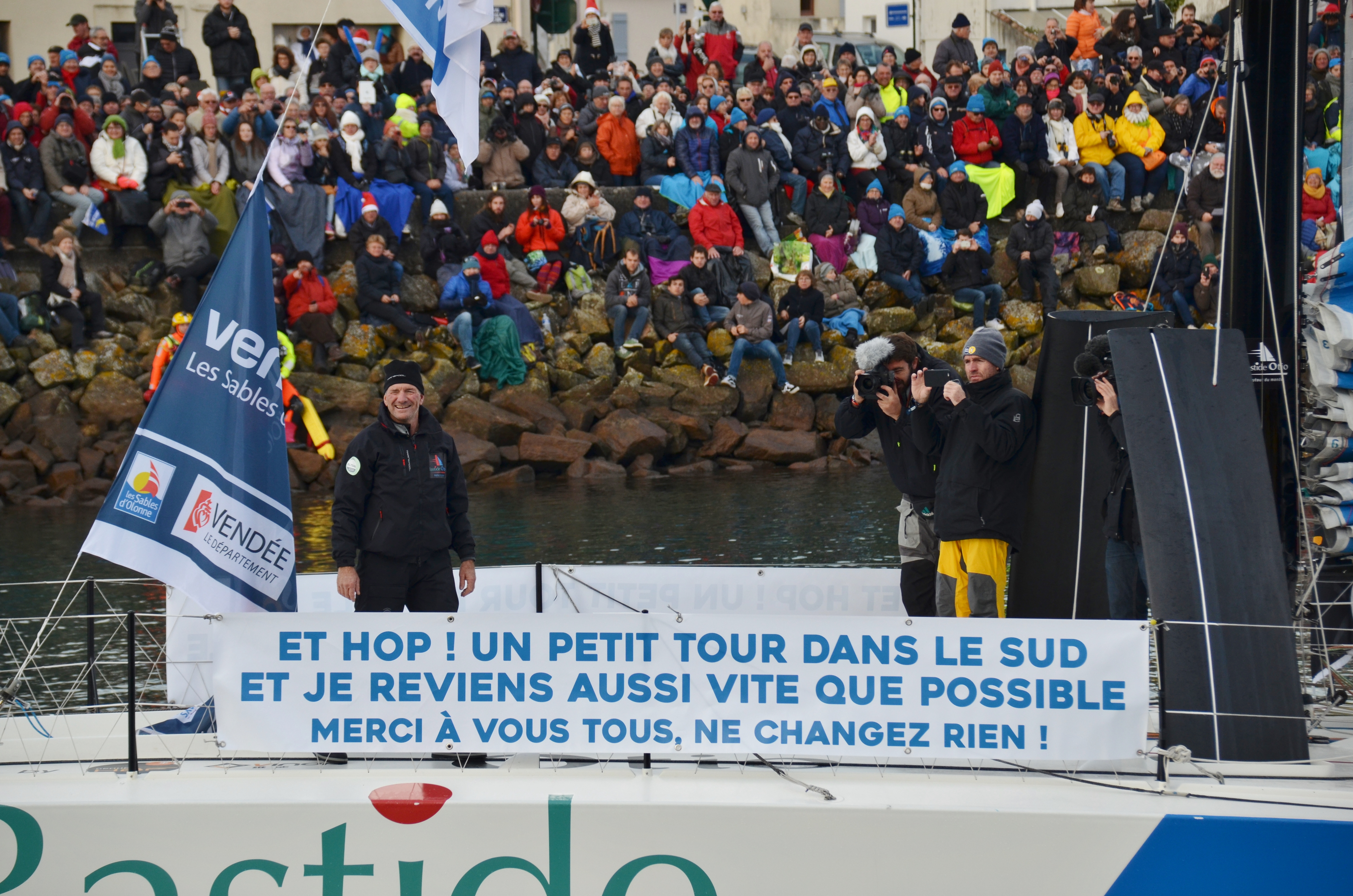

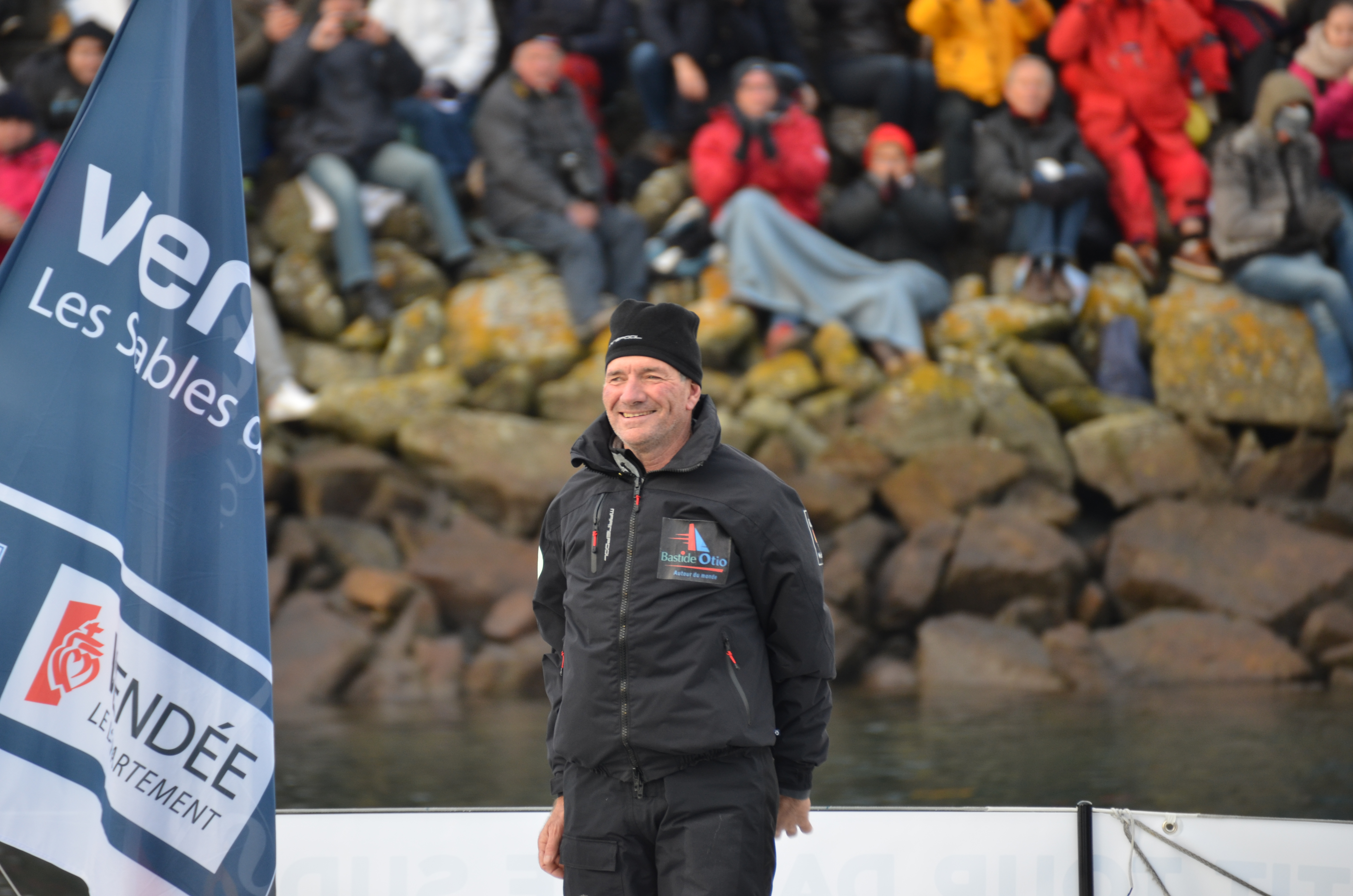

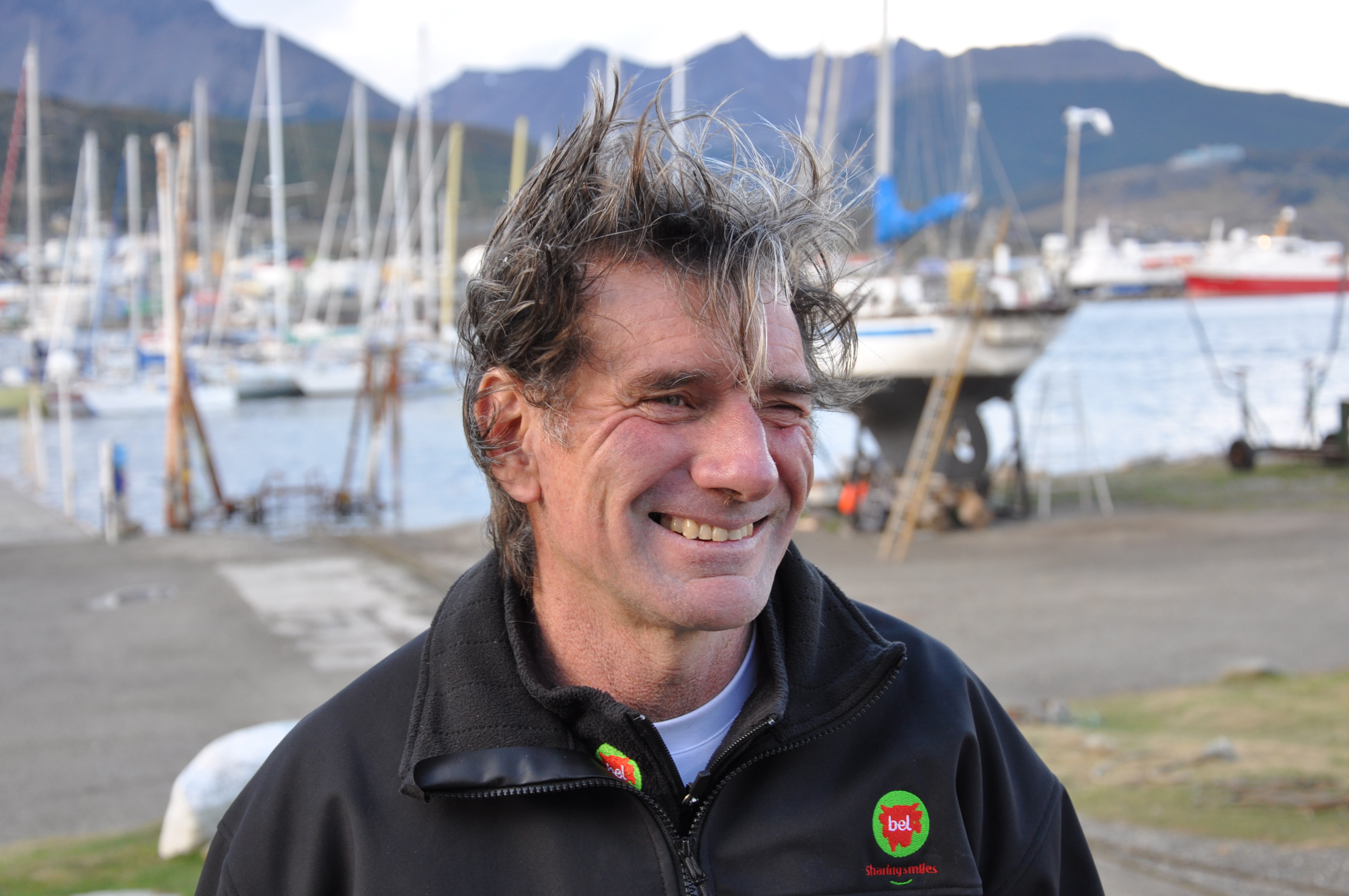

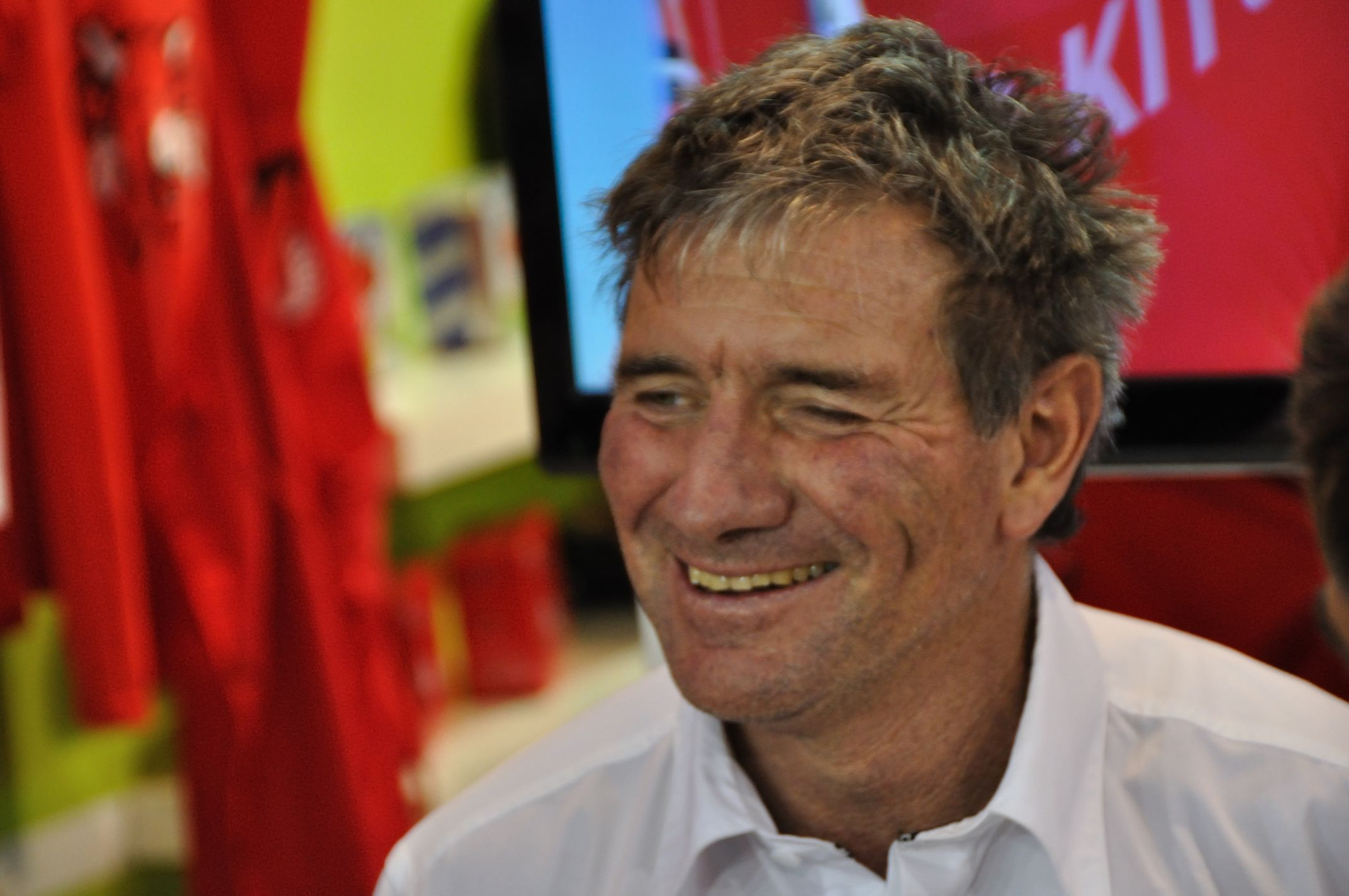

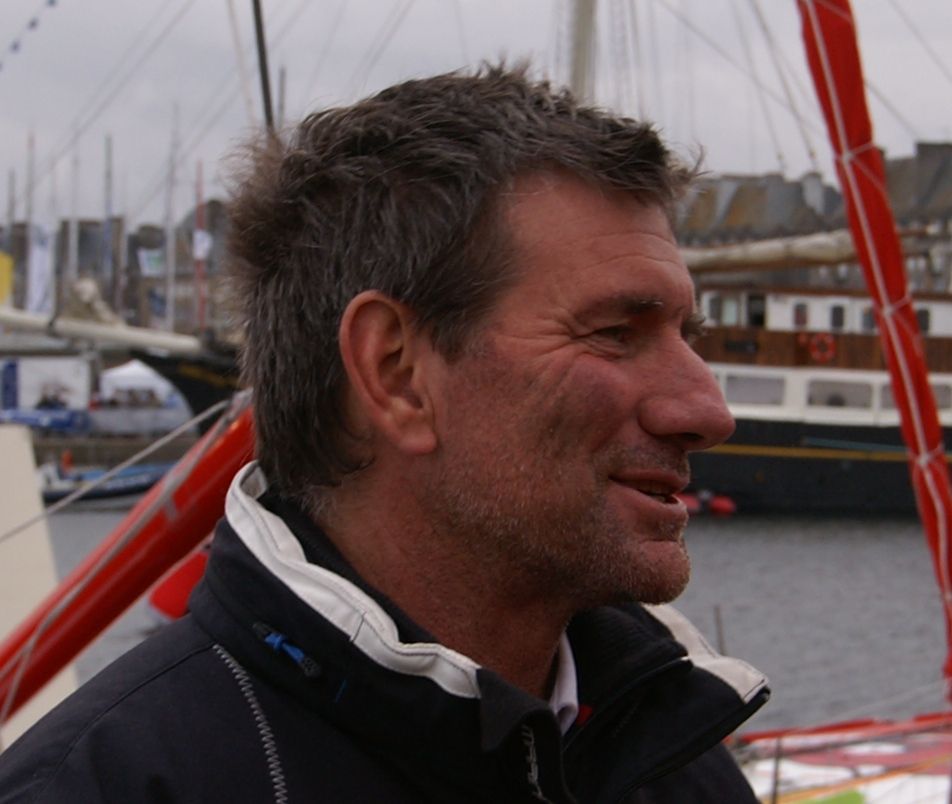

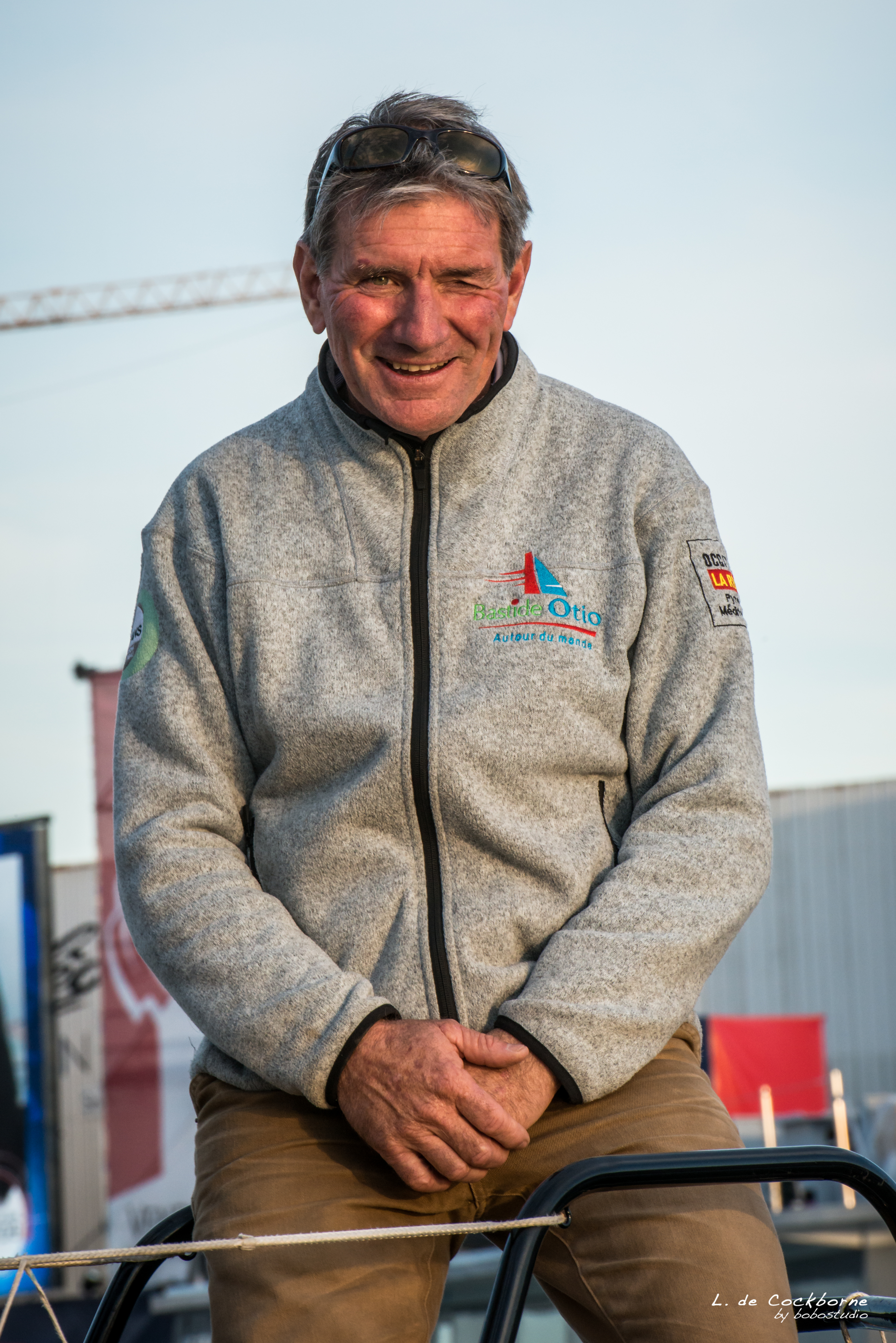

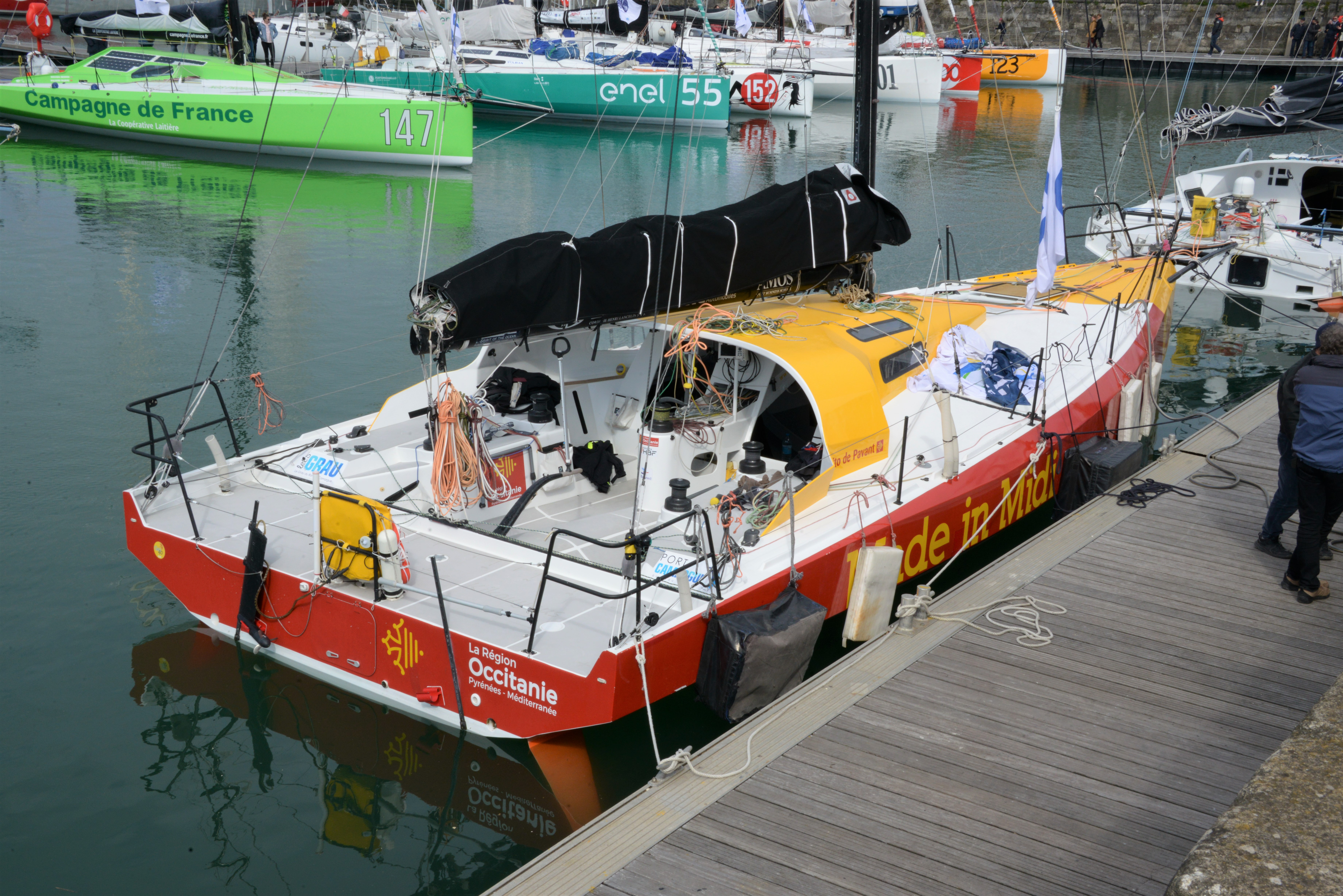

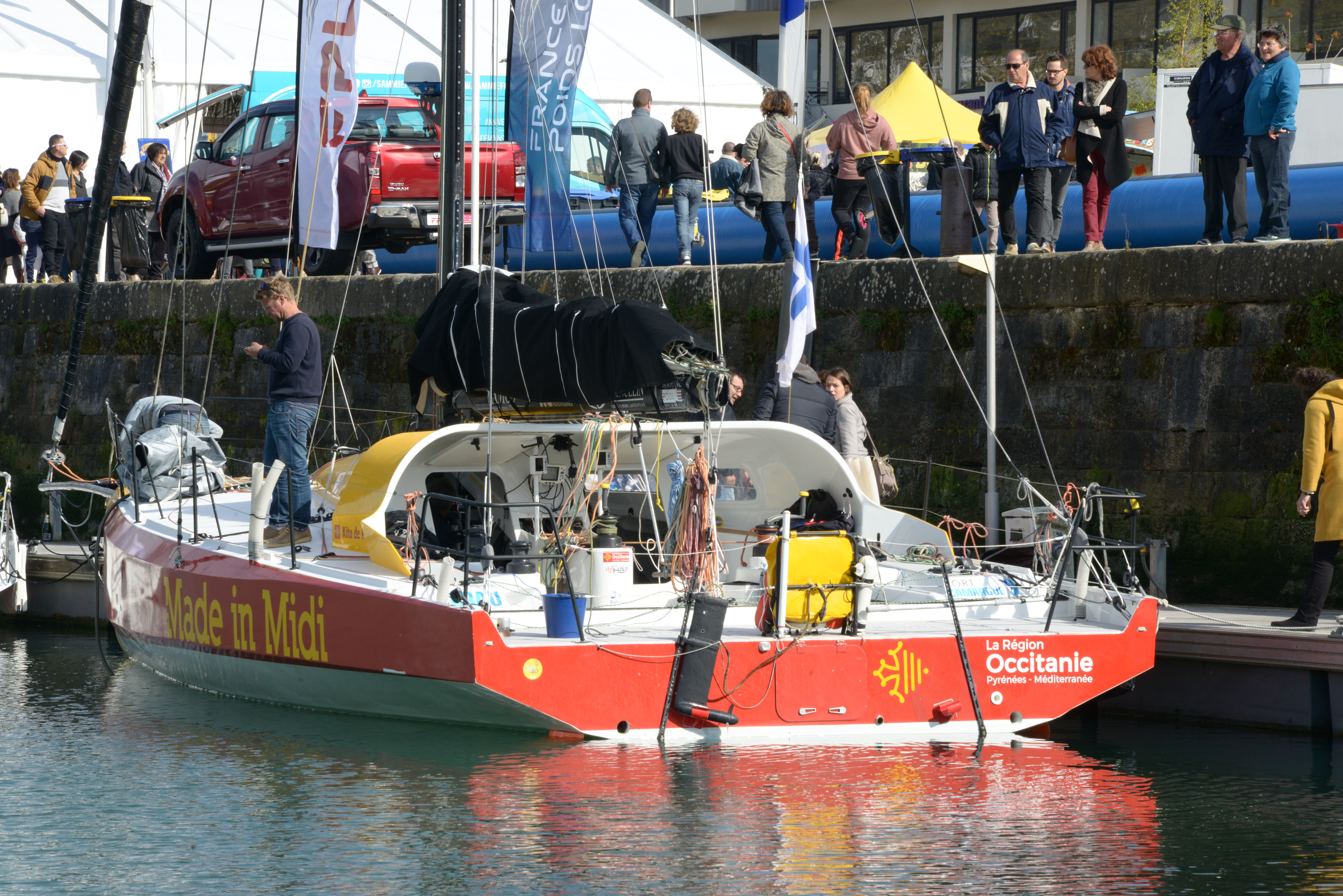

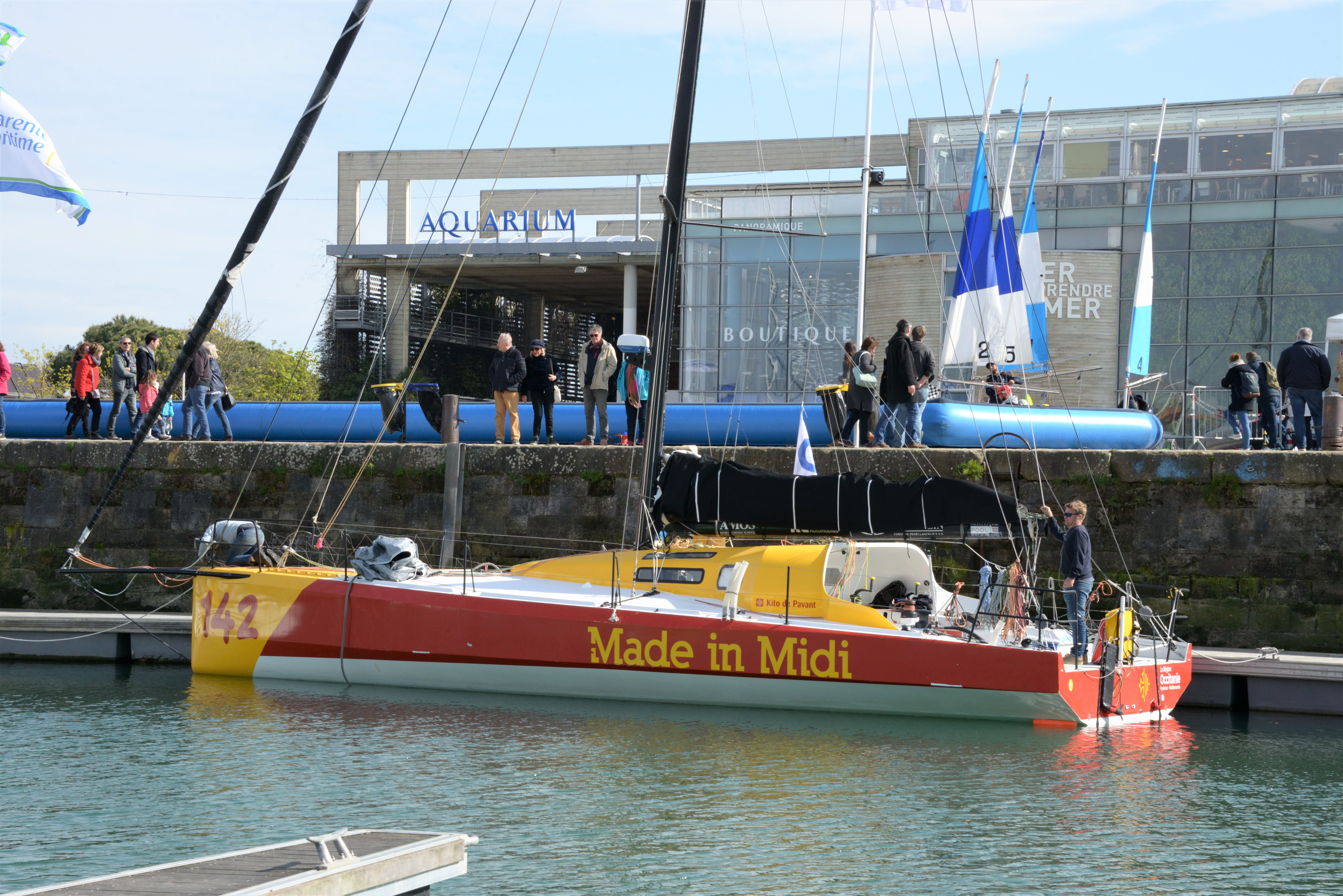
