= IMOCA 60 Armor Lux =

Tout commence en Finistère - Armor-lux
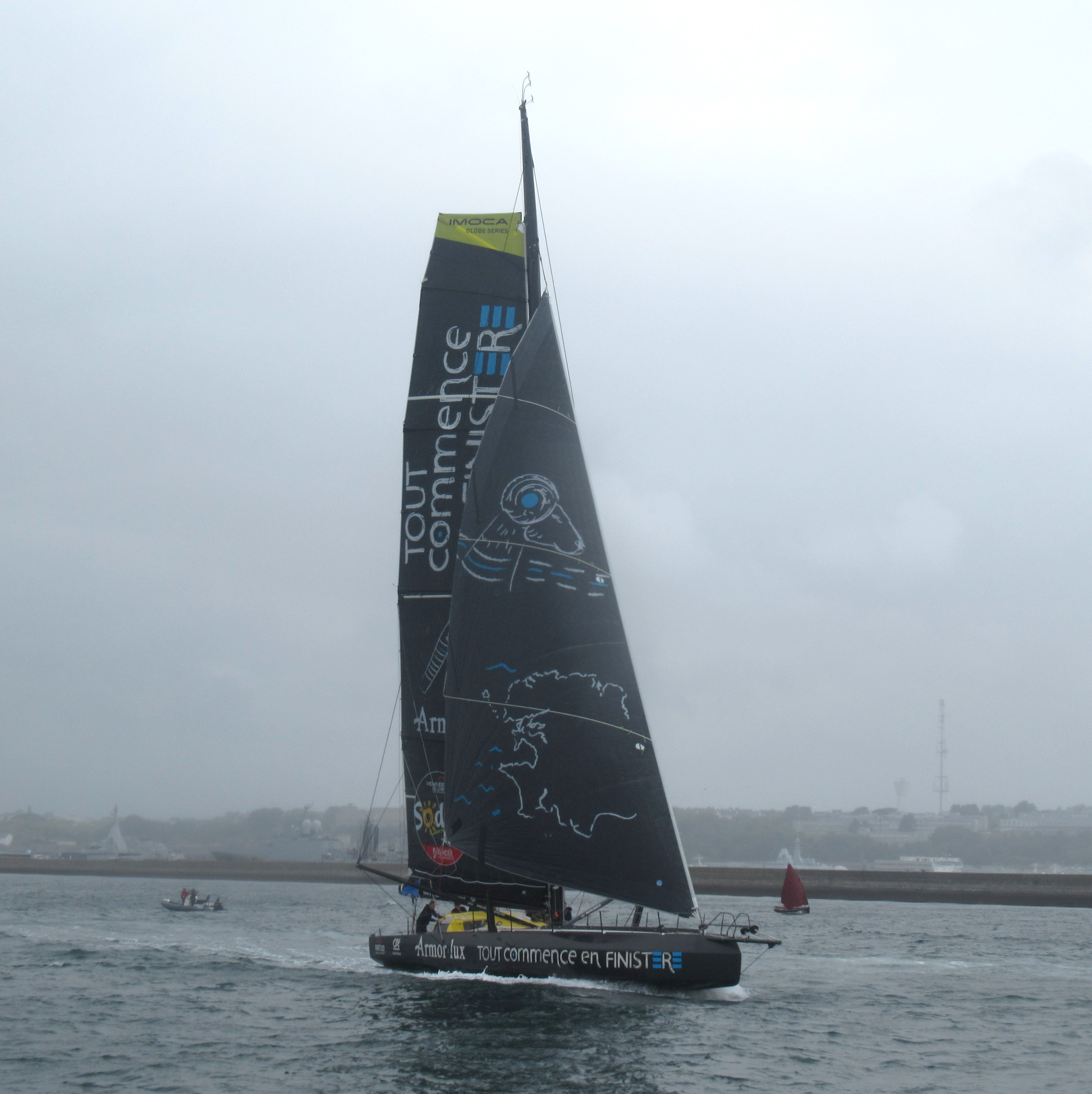

Development
- Designer: David Raison
- Year: 2023-09-30
- Builder: Persico Marine (ITA)
- Name: Tout commence en Finistère - Armor-lux

Hull appendages
- General: two rudders, two daggerboards
- Keel: canting keel

Racing
- Class association: IMOCA 60

Tout commence en Finistère - Armor-lux, is an IMOCA 60 monohull sailing yacht, designed by David Raison and constructed by Persico Marine in Italy, launched on 30. of September 2023. It is designed for the Vendée Globe 2024, a solo tour of the world. Its skipper is the French Jean Le Cam.

== Design ==
The IMOCA 60 Armor Lux has no hydrofoils. It is sistership to Stand As One - Altavia.

== Racing results ==
Pos	Year	Race	Class	Boat name	(Co-)Skipper	Configuration, Time, Notes	Ref
Transatlantic Races
32	2023	Retour à la base	IMOCA 60	Tout commence en Finistère - Armor-lux	Jean Le Cam (FRA)	solo; 18d 5h 37m 24s	
