= Beneteau Figaro =

Sailboat class

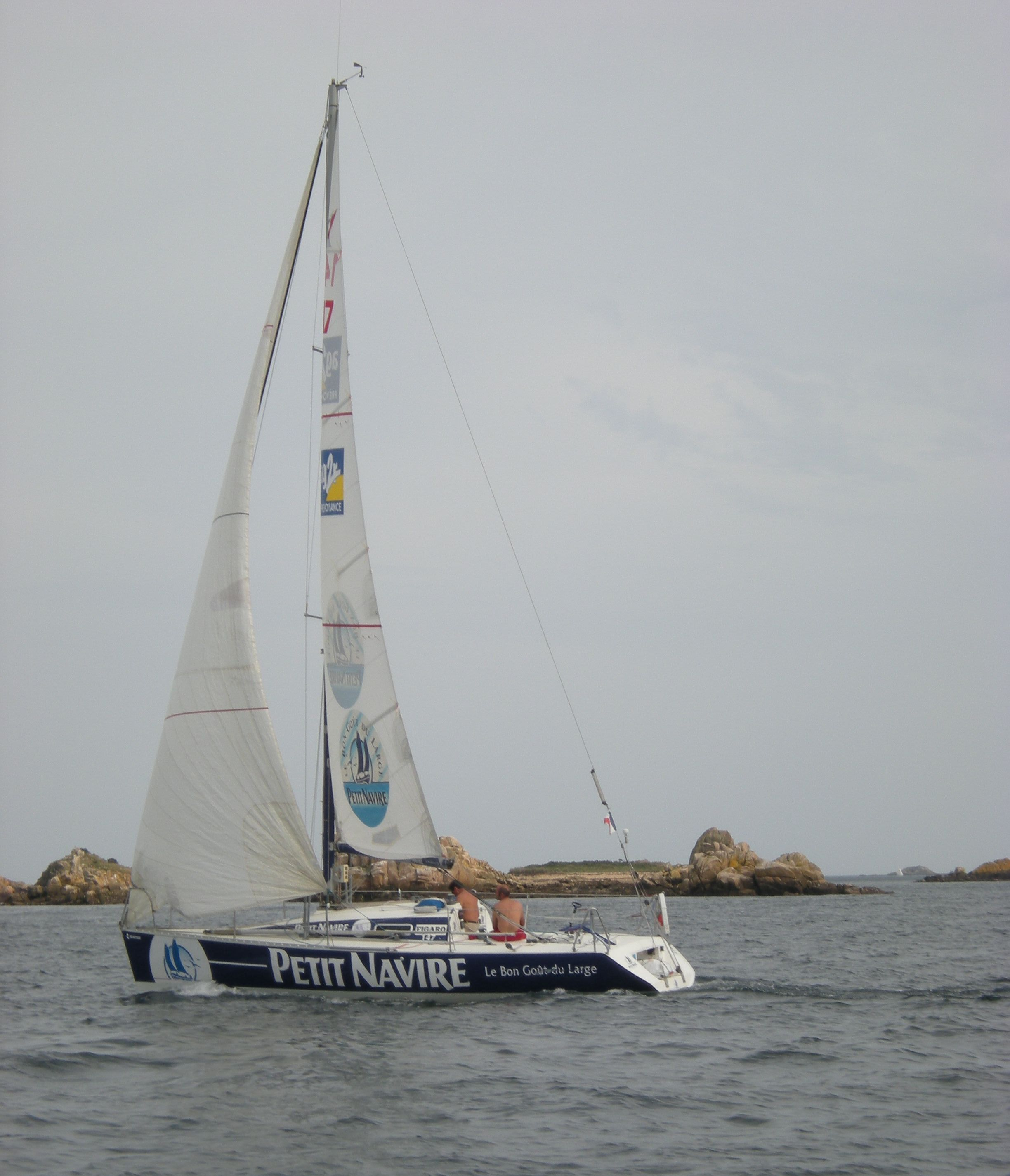

Development
- Designer: Jean Berret; Groupe Finot
- Location: France
- Year: 1990
- No. built: 140
- Builder: Beneteau
- Role: One design racer
- Name: Beneteau Figaro

Boat
- Displacement: 5,291 lb (2,400 kg)
- Draft: 5.92 ft (1.80 m)

Hull
- Type: monohull
- Construction: glassfibre
- LOA: 29.99 ft (9.14 m)
- LWL: 27.56 ft (8.40 m)
- Beam: 10.66 ft (3.25 m)
- Engine: Yanmar 1GM diesel engine

Hull appendages
- Keel: Fin keel with weighted bulb
- Ballast: 1,984 lb (900 kg)
- Rudder: Spade-type rudder

Rig
- Rig type: Bermuda rig
- I foretriangle height: 40.09 ft (12.22 m)
- J foretriangle base: 11.25 ft (3.43 m)
- P mainsail luff: 41.54 ft (12.66 m)
- E mainsail foot: 13.77 ft (4.20 m)

Sails
- Sailplan: Fractional rigged sloop
- Mainsail area: 286.00 sq ft (26.570 m^{2})
- Jib/genoa area: 225.51 sq ft (20.951 m^{2})
- Spinnaker area: 785.7 sq ft (72.99 m^{2})
- Upwind sail area: 511.51 sq ft (47.521 m^{2})
- Downwind sail area: 1,071.7 sq ft (99.56 m^{2})

Racing
- PHRF: 99-105

The Beneteau Figaro, also called the Figaro I, the Figaro Solo and officially designated as the Figaro Beneteau, is a French sailboat that was designed by Groupe Finot and Jean Berret as a one design, single-handed, off-shore racer especially for the Solitaire du Figaro race and first built in 1990. The boat and the race are both named for the sponsor of the race, Le Figaro. It was also used for the first one-design transatlantic race, the double-handed Transat AG2R from 1992 to 2002.

== Production ==
The design was built by Beneteau in France, from 1990 to 2002, with 140 boats completed.

It was replaced by the Beneteau Figaro 2 in 2003.

== Design ==
The Figaro is a racing keelboat, built predominantly of solid glassfibre. The hull has a raked stem, a reverse transom, an internally mounted spade-type rudder controlled by a tiller and a fixed fin keel with a swept, weighted bulb. It displaces 5,291 lb (2,400 kg) and carries 1,984 lb (900 kg) of iron and water ballast.

It has a fractional sloop rig with two sets of swept spreaders.

The boat has a draft of 5.92 ft (1.80 m) with the standard keel.

The boat is fitted with a Yanmar 1GM diesel engine for docking and manoeuvring. The fuel tank holds 8 U.S. gallons (30 L; 6.7 imp gal).

The design has sleeping accommodation for six people in a minimalist interior. For sailing downwind it may be equipped with a symmetrical spinnaker of 785.7 sq ft (72.99 m^{2}).

The design has a hull speed of 7.03 kn (13.02 km/h) and a PHRF handicap of 99 to 105.

== Reception ==
Sailboat Lab notes, "the Figaro Solo Beneteau is a light sailboat which is a very high performer. It is stable / stiff and has a low righting capability if capsized."

Reviewer Philippe Joubin noted in August 1990 in Seahorse International Yacht Racing, that the adoption of the boat for the Solitaire du Figaro, making it a one design race, would transform the race and give it new credibility.
