= IMOCA 60 Pindar 2 =

Sailboat

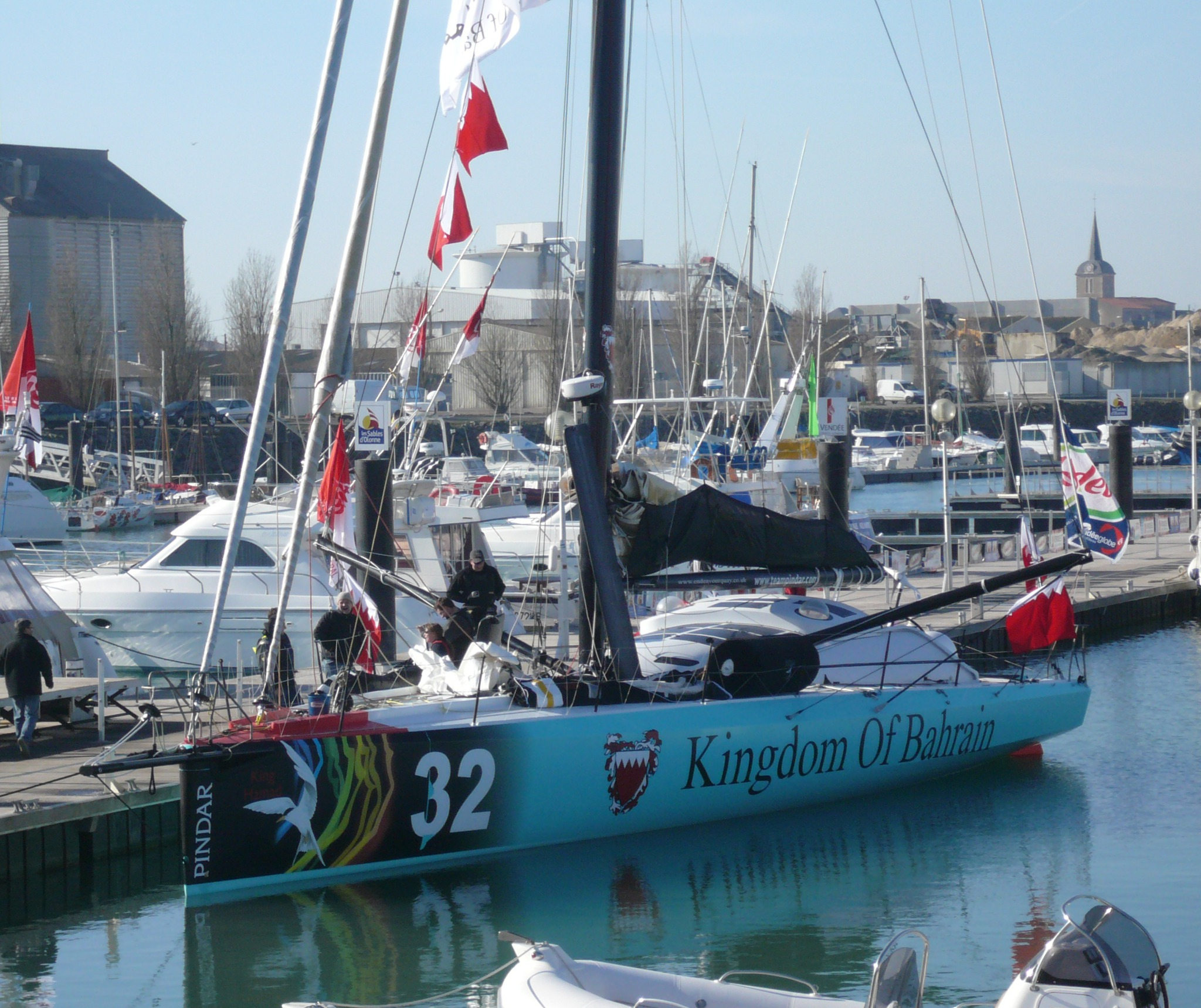

Development
- Designer: Juan Kouyoumdjian
- Builder: Cookson Boats (NZL) Ltd

Hull appendages
- Keel: Canting Keel
- Rudder: Twin Rudders

Racing
- Class association: IMOCA 60

The IMOCA 60 class yacht Pindar (2) was designed by Juan Kouyoumdjian and launched in 2007 after being assembled by Cookson Boats based in New Zealand. Soon after launch the boat lost it mast during Cowes Week. The boat was conceived for a mixed of crewed racing and therefore was the most powerful IMOCA of it generation with a number of initiative features. The boat was extensively damaged in 2013–2014 and has not sailed since and has been written off by the insurance company.

Not to be confused with the IMOCA 50 and IMOCA 60 both previous named Pindar.

== Racing results ==
Pos	Year	Race	Class	Boat name	Skipper	Notes	Ref
Round the world races
7 / 14	2010	Barcelona World Race	IMOCA 60	Hugo Boss 3	Andy Meiklejohn (GBR); Wouter Verbraak (NED)	111d 10h 49m	
5 / 30	2009	2008–2009 Vendée Globe	IMOCA 60	Bahrain Team Pindar	Brian Thompson (FRA)	98d 20h 29m	
Transatlantic Races
Other Races
22 / 72	2011	Rolex Sydney Hobart Race	IRC Overall	Hugo Boss 3		2d 16h 38m	
5 / 6	2011	Rolex Fastnet Race	IMOCA 60	Hugo Boss 3		2d 00h 44m	
143 / 184	2011	Rolex Giraglia Cup	Handicap	Hugo Boss 3		42h 46m	
4 / 11	2009	Rolex Fastnet Race	IMOCA 60	Pindar		2d 19h 15m	
