= IMOCA 60 Artemis 2 =

Round the World Racing Yacht

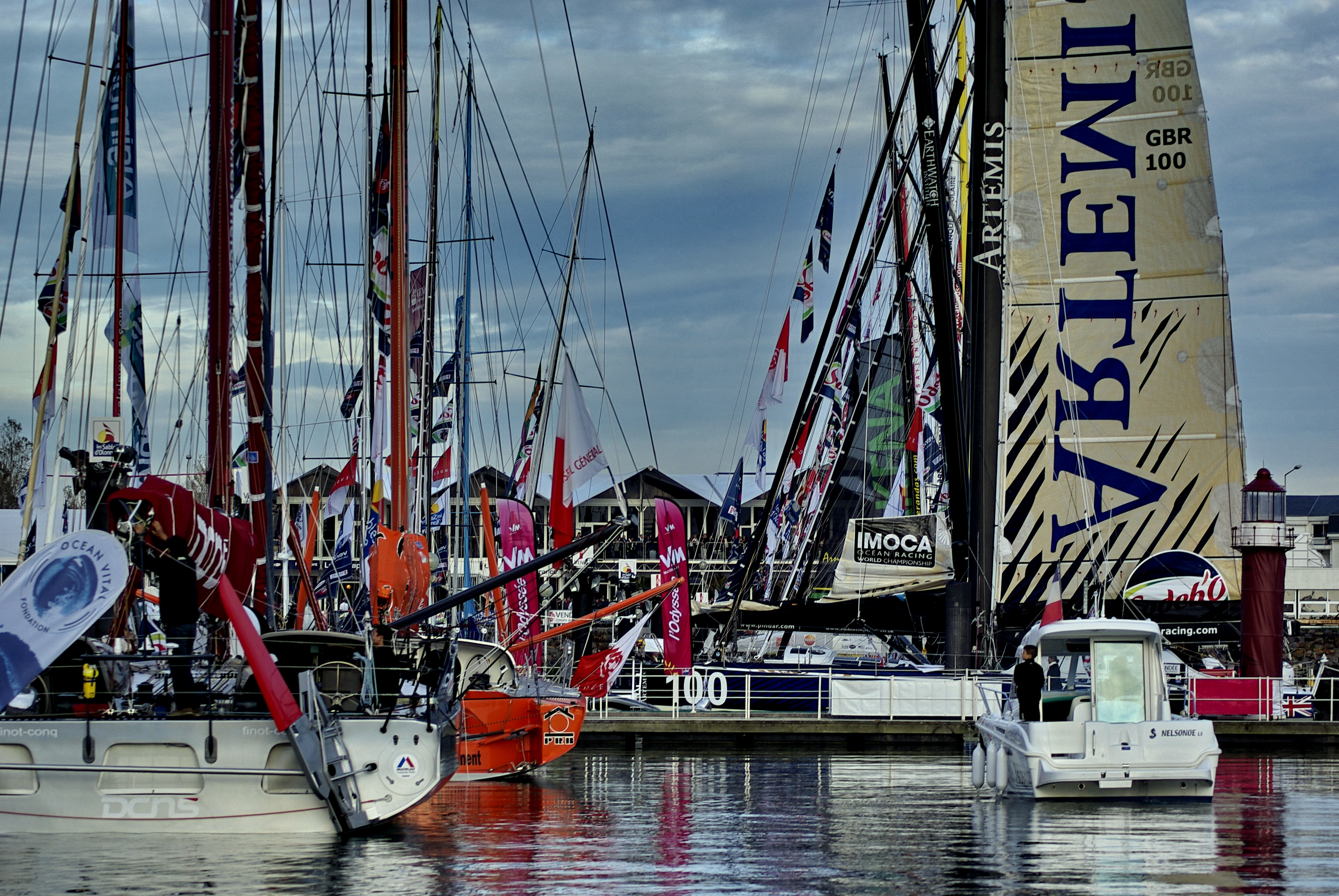

Development
- Designer: Rodgers Yacht Design
- Builder: Neville Hutton Boat Builder

The IMOCA 60 class yacht Artemis Ocean Racing Team II, GBR 100 was designed by Jeremy Rogers and launched in the April 2008 after being built Neville Hutton based in Lymington in United Kingdom.

== Racing results ==
Pos	Year	Race	Class	Boat name	Skipper	Notes	Ref
Round the world races
DNF	2009	2008–2009 Vendée Globe	IMOCA 60	Artemis Ocean Racing Team II	Jonny Malbon (GBR)	121d 00h 40m	
Transatlantic Races
10 / 14	2009	Transat Jacques Vabre	IMOCA 60	Artemis Ocean Racing Team II	Sydney Gavignet (FRA); Sam Davies (GBR)	19d 16h 20m	
Other Races
