= 2008–2009 Vendée Globe =

Event title
- Name: 2008–2009 Vendée Globe
- Edition: 6th edition
- Sponsor: Vendee Region of France

Event details
- Start location: Les Sables-d'Olonne
- Finish location: Les Sables-d'Olonne
- Course: Solo non-stop round the world race
- Start date: 9 November 2008
- Finish date: 9 November 2008
- Yachts: IMOCA 60
- Key people: Race Director; Denis Horeau

Competitors
- Competitors: 30

Results
- (gold) Gold: Michel Desjoyeaux (FRA)
- (silver) Silver: Armel Le Cléac'h (FRA)
- (bronze) Bronze: Vincent Riou (FRA)

The 2008–2009 Vendée Globe was a non-stop solo round-the-world yacht race for IMOCA 60 class yachts and the sixth edition of the race.

== Summary ==
The 2008 Vendée Globe began on 9 November 2008 and was won by Michel Desjoyaux, who set a new record at 84d 3h 9' 8".

Race Director for this edition was Denis Horeau who heads the event management team having done the role for the 1989 and 2004 editions.

== Incidents ==
=== Retirement causes ===
The problems encountered by Jean Le Cam—losing his keel bulb and capsizing in the Southern Ocean—had a major impact on the order of finish. Fellow competitor Vincent Riou diverted and found his boat, circling to try to toss a rope to Le Cam who had exited a security hatch to hang onto the rudder. After three failed attempts, Vincent Riou went in closer, managing to rescue Jean Le Cam but also damaging his mast which failed soon after. Riou retired, but was awarded third place on redress, as he was third when diverted to assist the boat in distress. In addition Armel Le Cléac’h was awarded 11 hours, Sam Davies 32 hours and Marc Guillemot 82 hours for diverting to aid in the rescue

== Results ==
Table: Order of finish, 2008–2009 Vendée Globe
Pos.	Sailor	Yacht	Time	Distance Sailed	Ref
1	Michel Desjoyeaux (FRA)	Foncia	84d 03h 09' 08" (new record)	28 303	
2	Armel Le Cléac'h (FRA)	Brit Air	89d 09h 39' 35" Corrected; 89d 20h 39' 35" Elapsed	27 232	
=3	Vincent Riou (FRA)	PRB 3	Day 59: Dismasted Redress Given		
=3	Marc Guillemot (FRA)	Safran (2)	95d 03h 19' 36" Corrected; 98d 13h 19' 36" Elapsed	28 401	
4	Samantha Davies (GBR)	Roxy (2)	95d 04h 39' 01" Corrected; 96d 12h 39' 01" Elapsed	27 470	
5	Brian Thompson (GBR)	Bahrain Team Pindar	98d 20h 29' 55"	28 699	
6	Dee Caffari (GBR)	Aviva	99d 01h 10' 57"	27 906	
7	Arnaud Boissières (FRA)	Akena Vérandas (2)	105d 02h 33' 50"	27 841	
8	Steve White (GBR)	Toe In The Water	109d 00h 36' 55"	28 197	
9	Rich Wilson (USA)	Great American III	121d 00h 41' 19"	28 590	
10	Raphaël Dinelli (FRA)	Fondation Ocean Vital	125d 02h 32' 24"	28 140	
11	Norbert Sedlacek (AUT)	Nauticsport-Kapsch	126d 05h 31' 56"	27 706	
DNF(18)	Roland Jourdain (FRA)	Veolia Environnement	day 85: lost keel		
DNF(17)	Jean Le Cam (FRA)	VM Matériaux (2)	day 58: lost keel bulb, capsized		
DNF(16)	Jonny Malbon (GBR)	Artemis (2)	day 56: delaminated mainsail		
DNF(15)	Jean-Pierre Dick (FRA)	Paprec-Virbac (2)	day 53: lost port rudder		
DNF(14)	Derek Hatfield (CAN)	Algimouss Spirit of Canada	day 50: broken spreaders		
DNF(13)	Sébastien Josse (FRA)	BT	day 50: broken rudder system		
DNF(12)	Yann Eliès (FRA)	Generali	day 40: fractured femur		
DNF(11)	Mike Golding (GBR)	Ecover 3	day 38: dismasted		
DNF(10)	Jean-Baptiste Dejeanty (FRA)	Groupe Maisonneuve	day 37: faulty halyards, broken auto-pilot		
DNF(9)	Loïck Peyron (FRA)	Gitana Eighty	day 36: dismasted		
DNF(8)	Bernard Stamm (FRA)	Cheminées Poujoulat (3)	day 36: ran aground		
DNF(7)	Dominique Wavre (SUI)	Temenos 2	day 35: damaged keel box		
DNF(6)	Unai Basurko (ESP)	Pakea Bizkaia	day 28: faulty starboard rudder box		
DNF(5)	Jérémie Beyou (FRA)	Delta Dore	day 17: damaged rig		
DNF(4)	Alex Thomson (GBR)	Hugo Boss 2	day 6: cracked hull		
DNF(3)	Yannick Bestaven (FRA)	Aquarelle.com – Charente Maritime	day 4: dismasted		
DNF(2)	Marc Thiercelin (FRA)	DCNS	day 4: dismasted		
DNF(1)	Kito de Pavant (FRA)	Groupe Bel	day 2: dismasted		

== Gallery ==
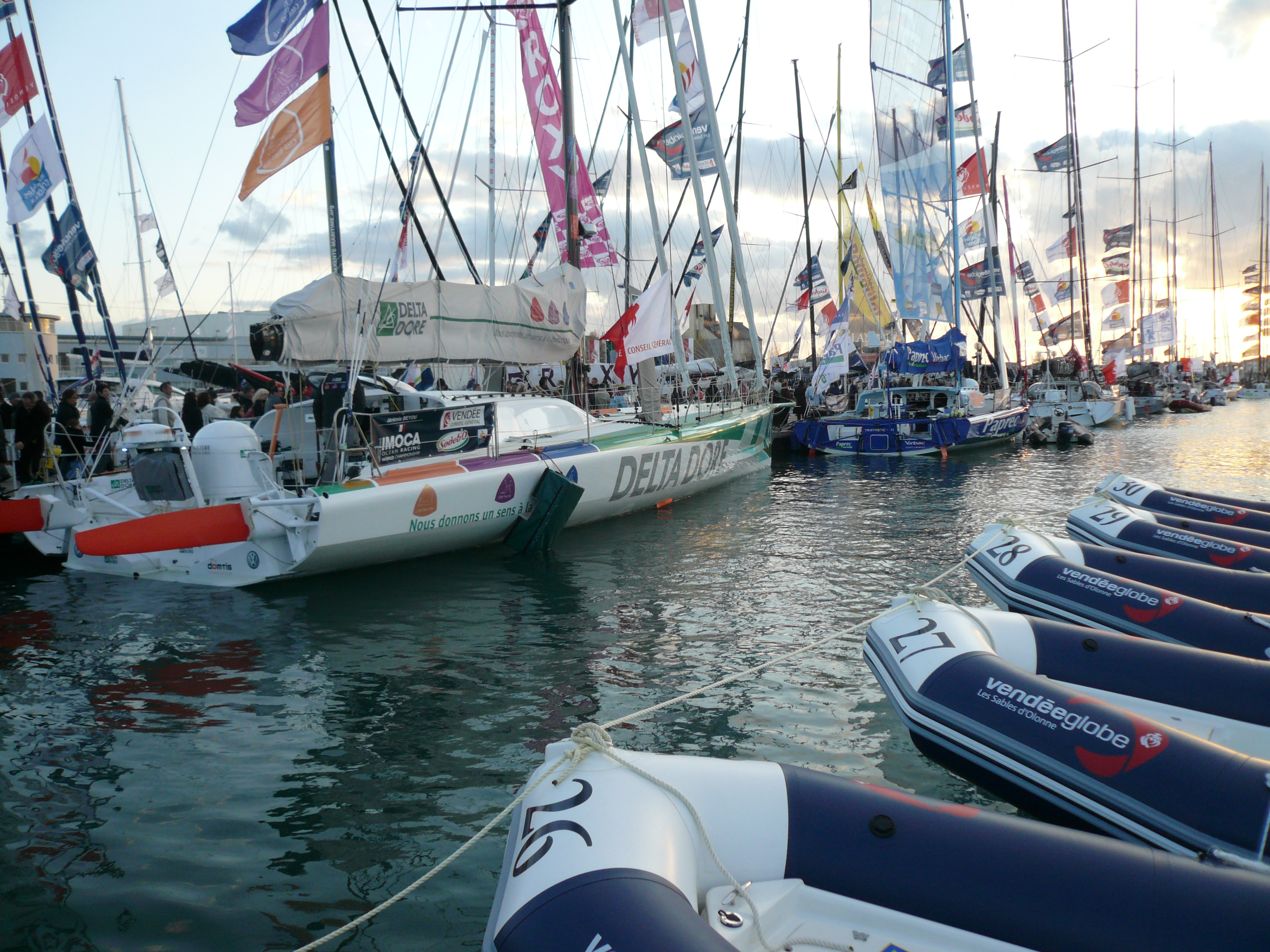
Delta Dore,

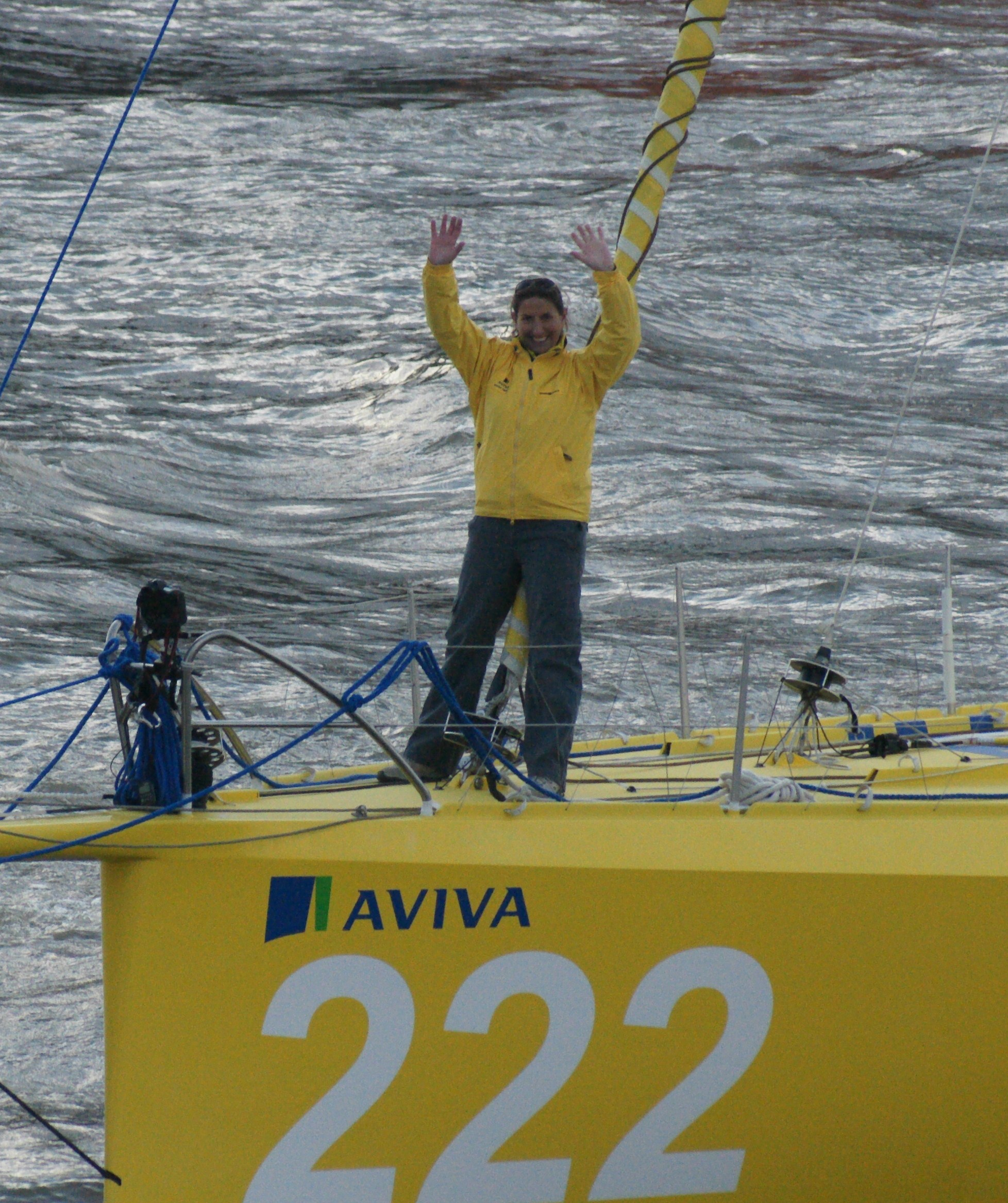
Aviva, Dee Caffari

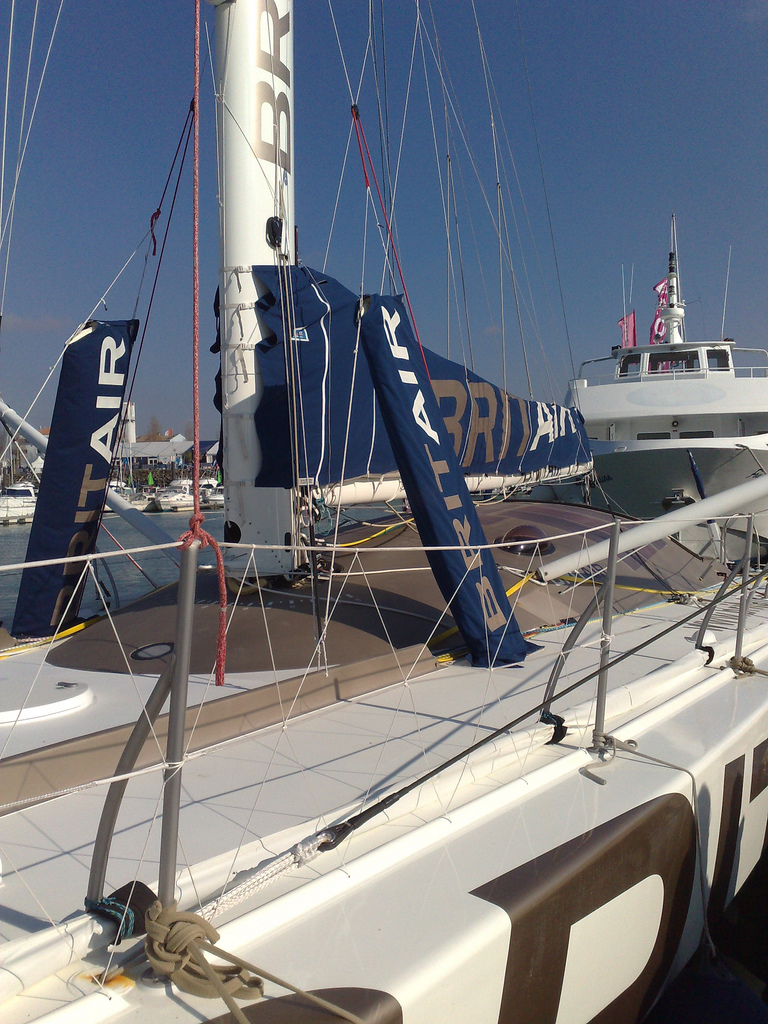
Britair,

== Entries ==
=== Participants gallery ===
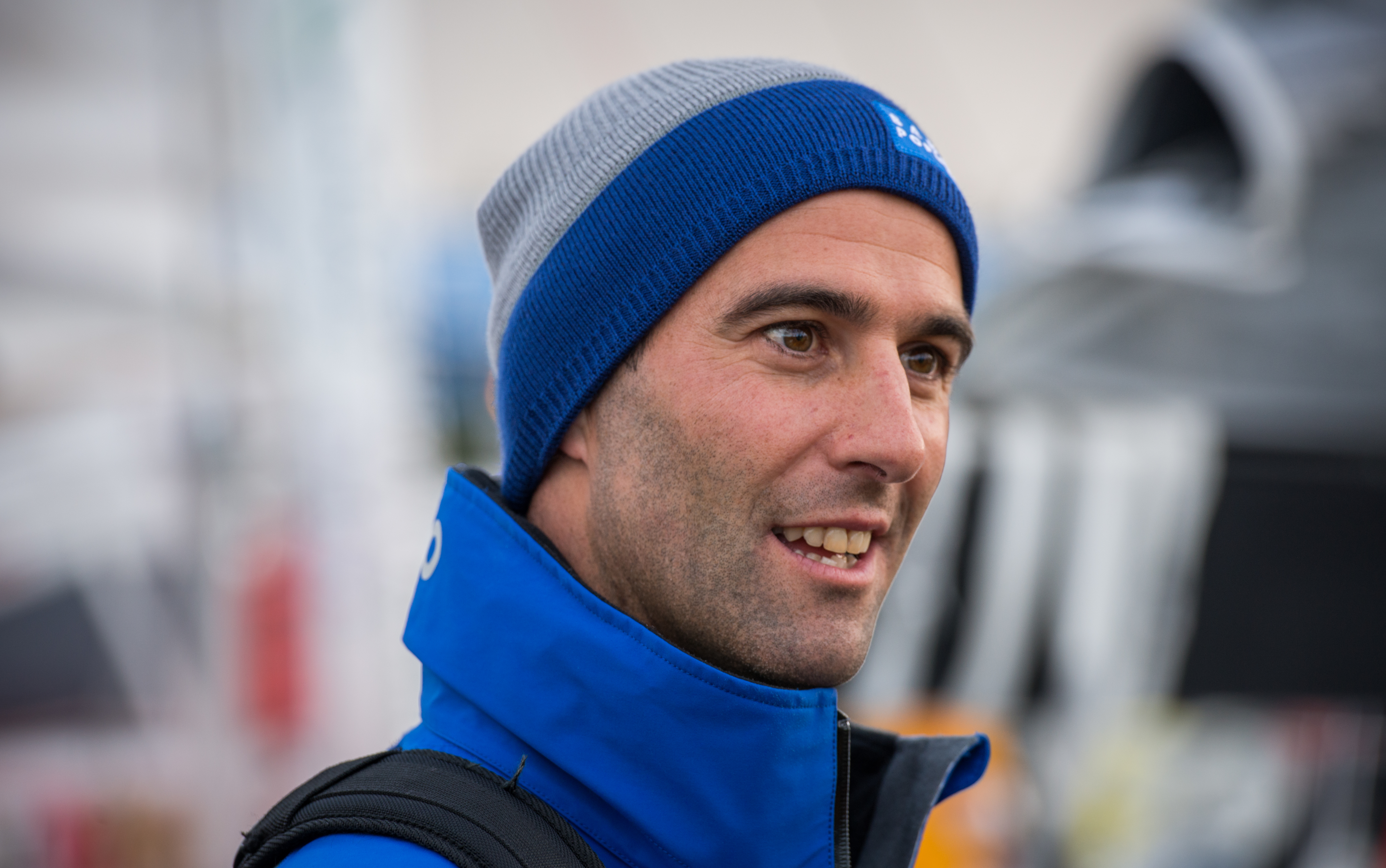
Armel Le Cléac'h (FRA)
Brit Air

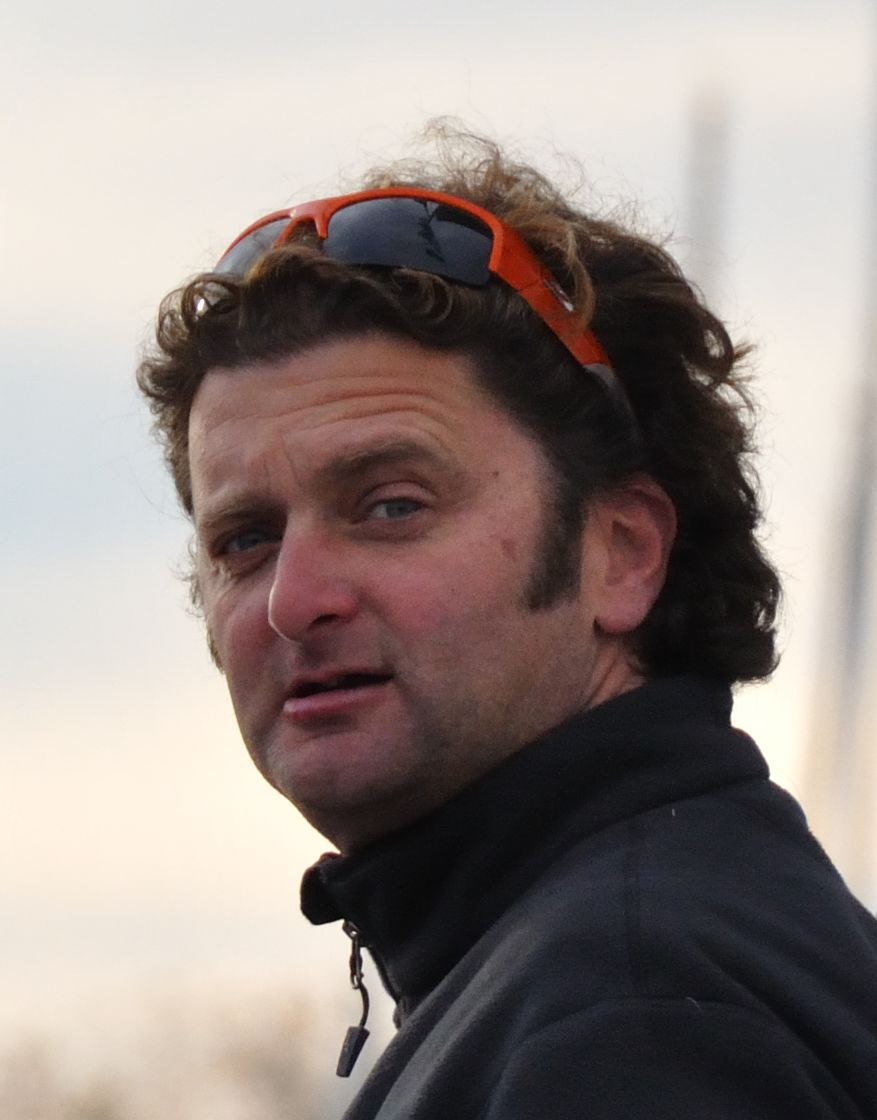
Arnaud Boissières (FRA)
Akena Vérandas

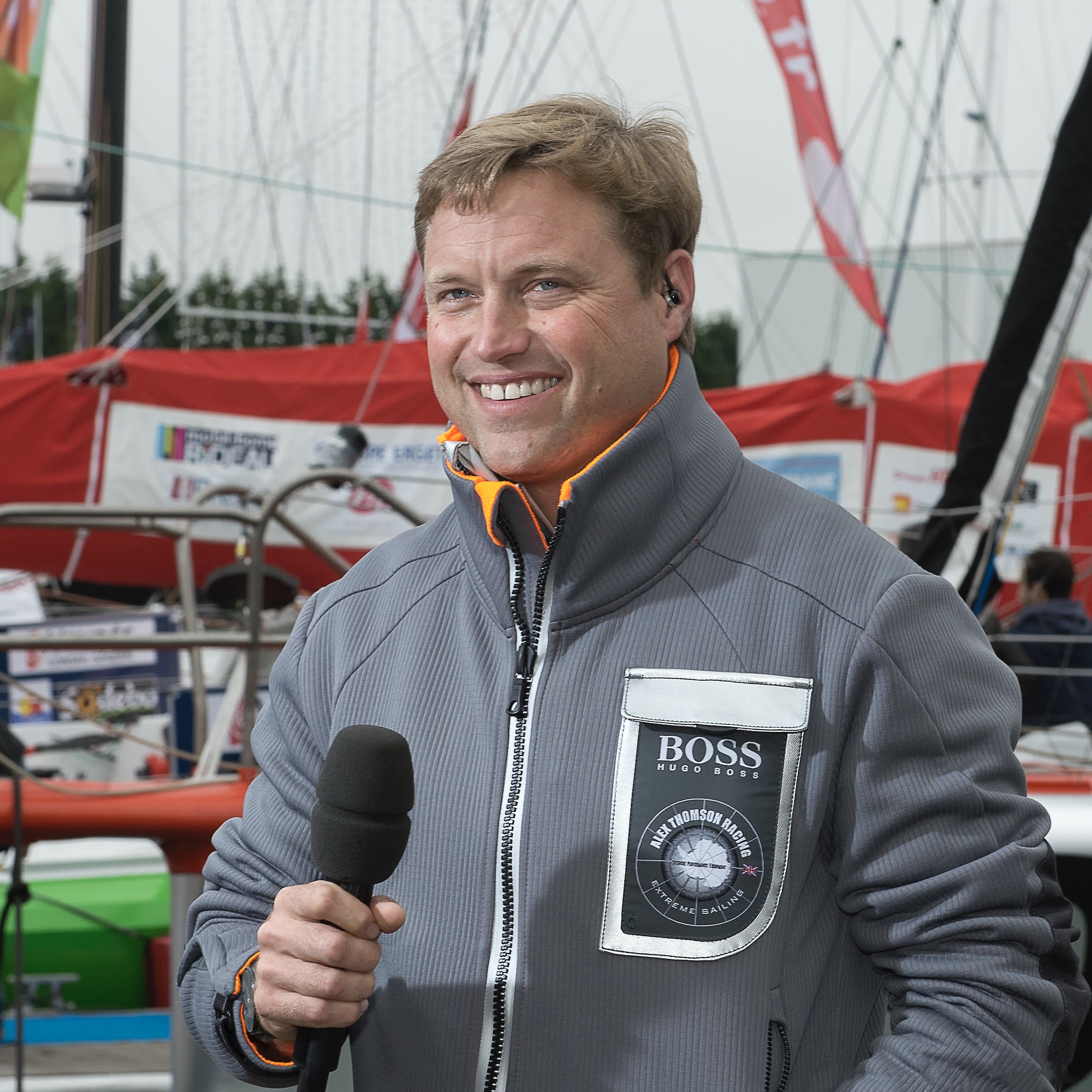
Alex Thomson (GBR)
Hugo Boss 2

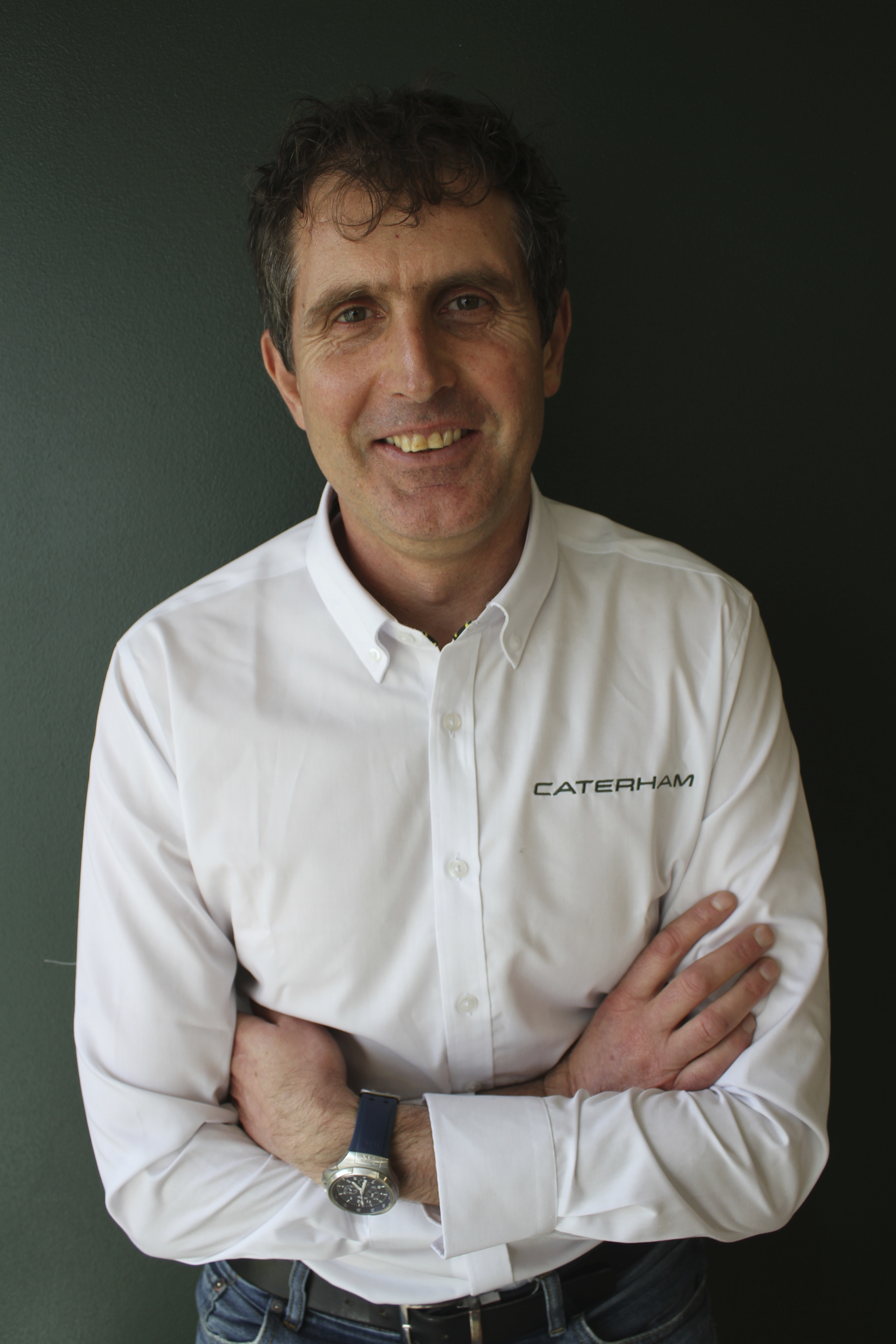
Brian Thompson (GBR)
Bahrain Team Pindar

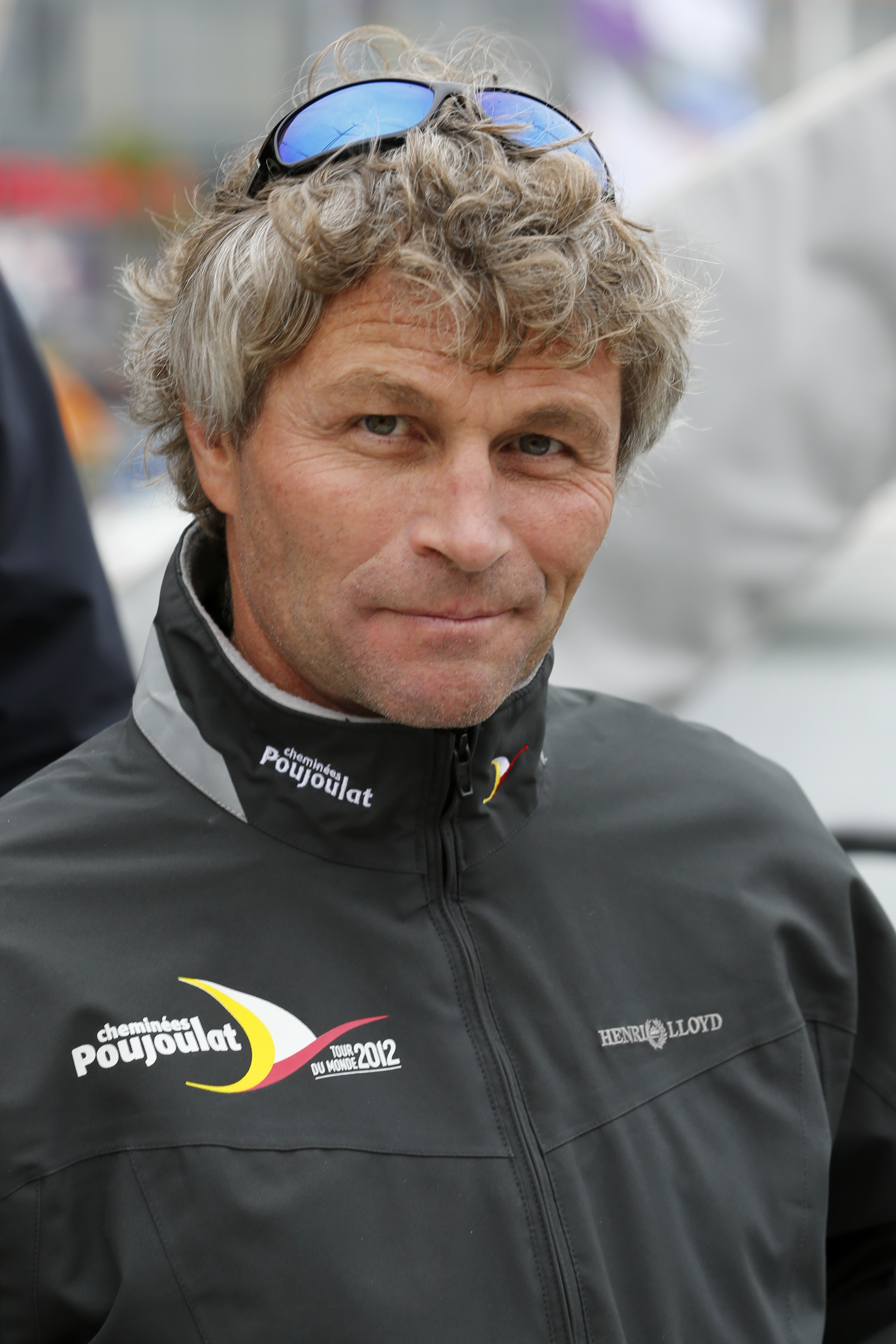
Bernard Stamm (FRA)
Cheminées Poujoulat (3)

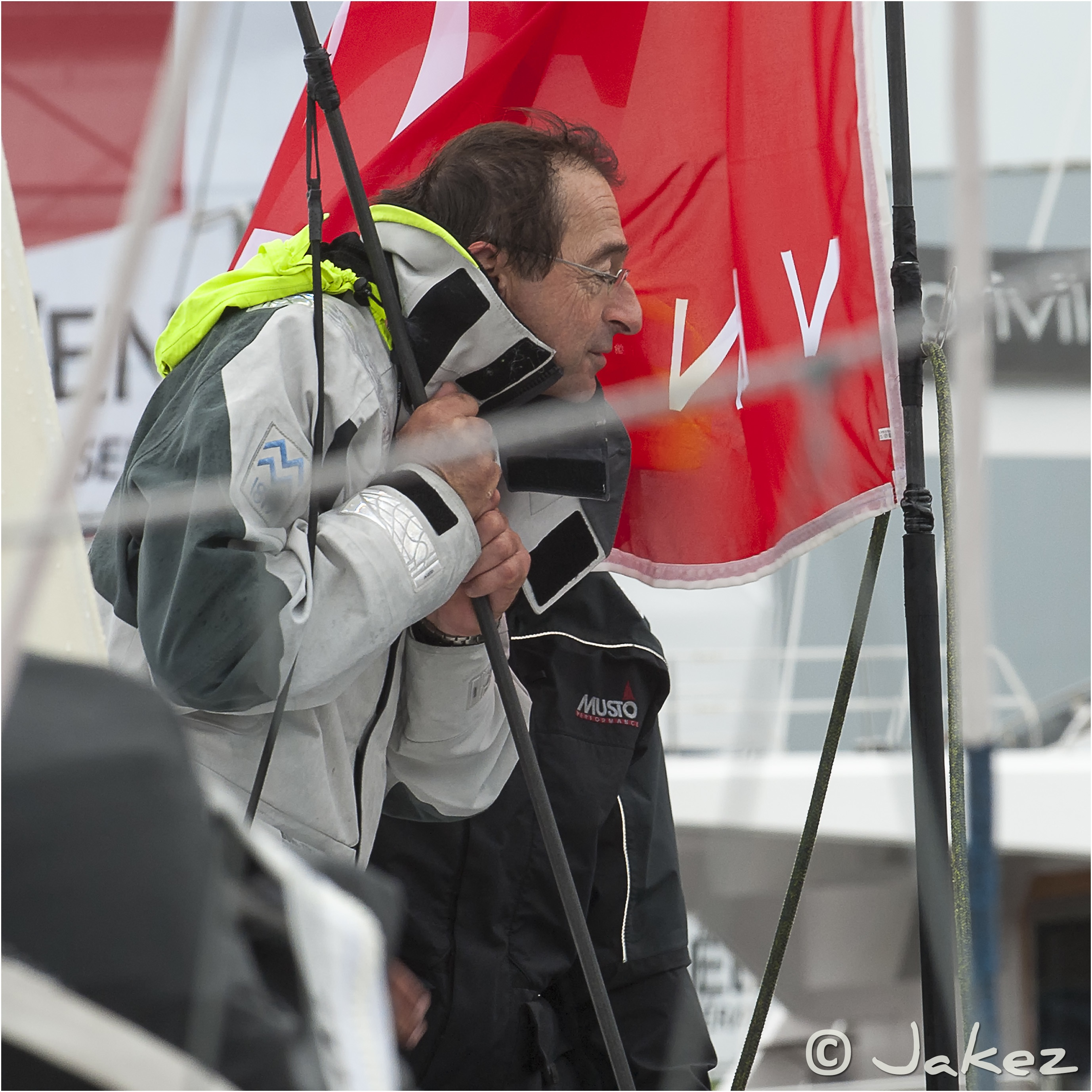
Dominique Wavre (SUI)
Temenos 2

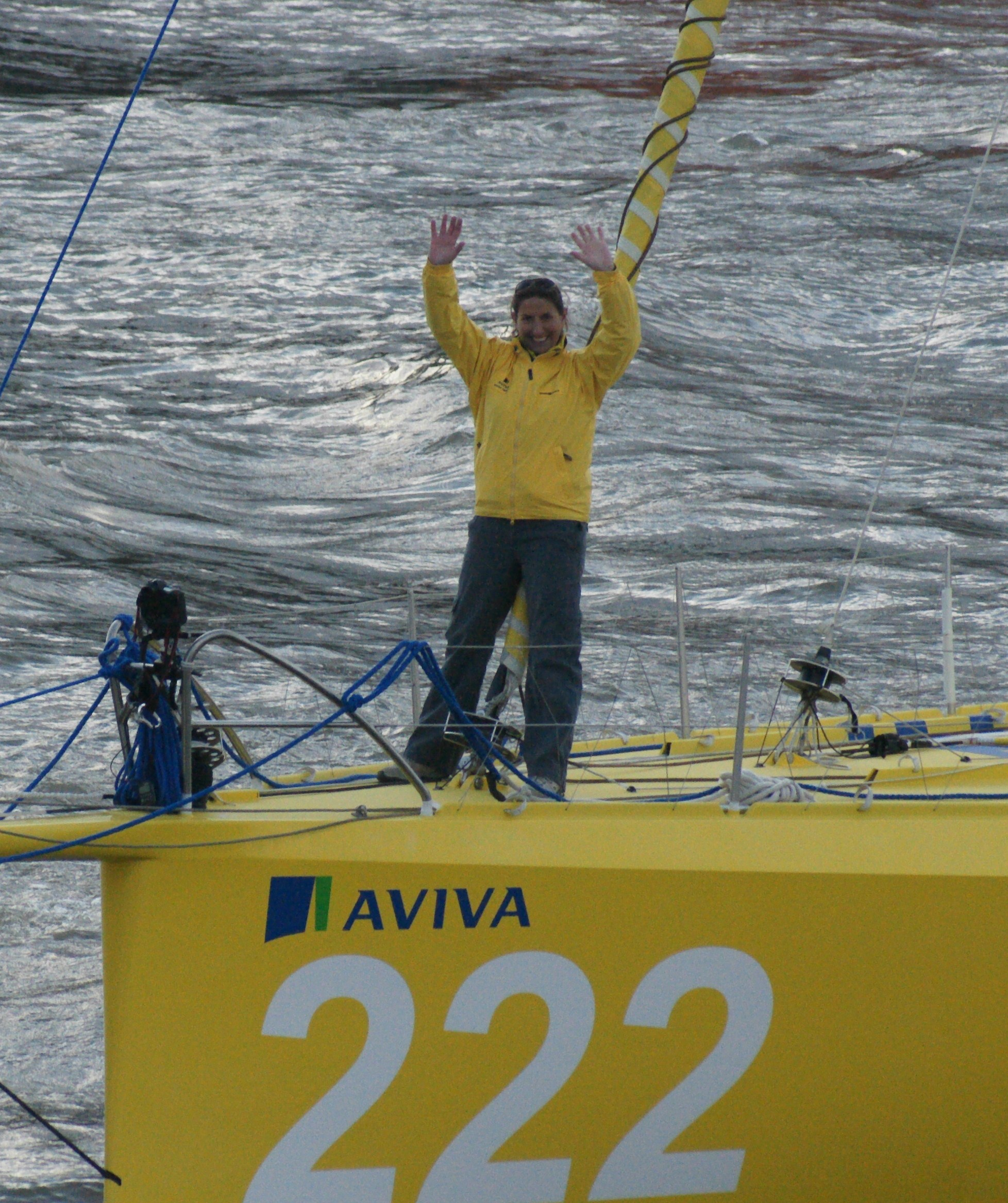
Dee Caffari (GBR)
Aviva

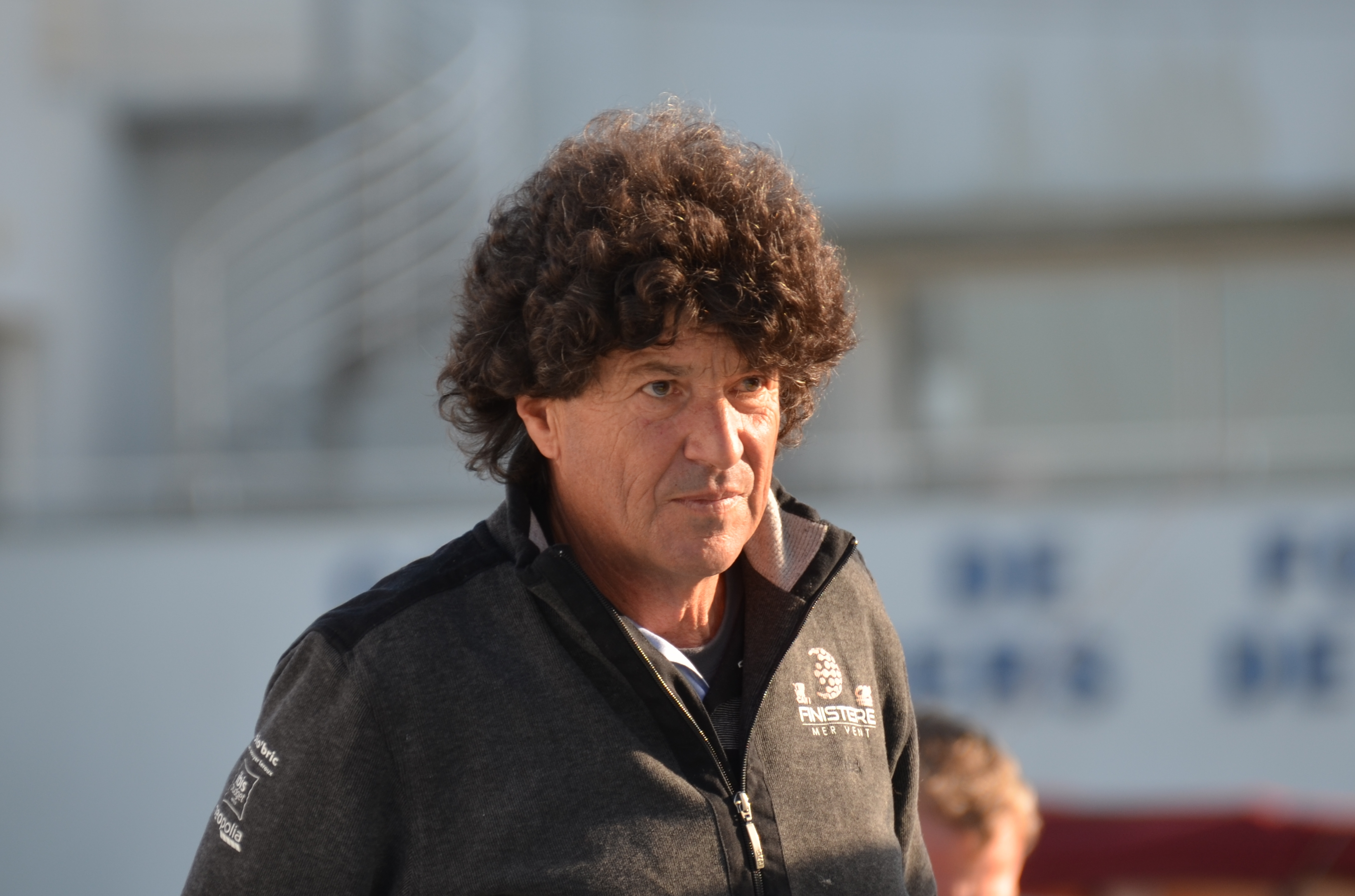
Jean Le Cam (FRA)
VM Matériaux

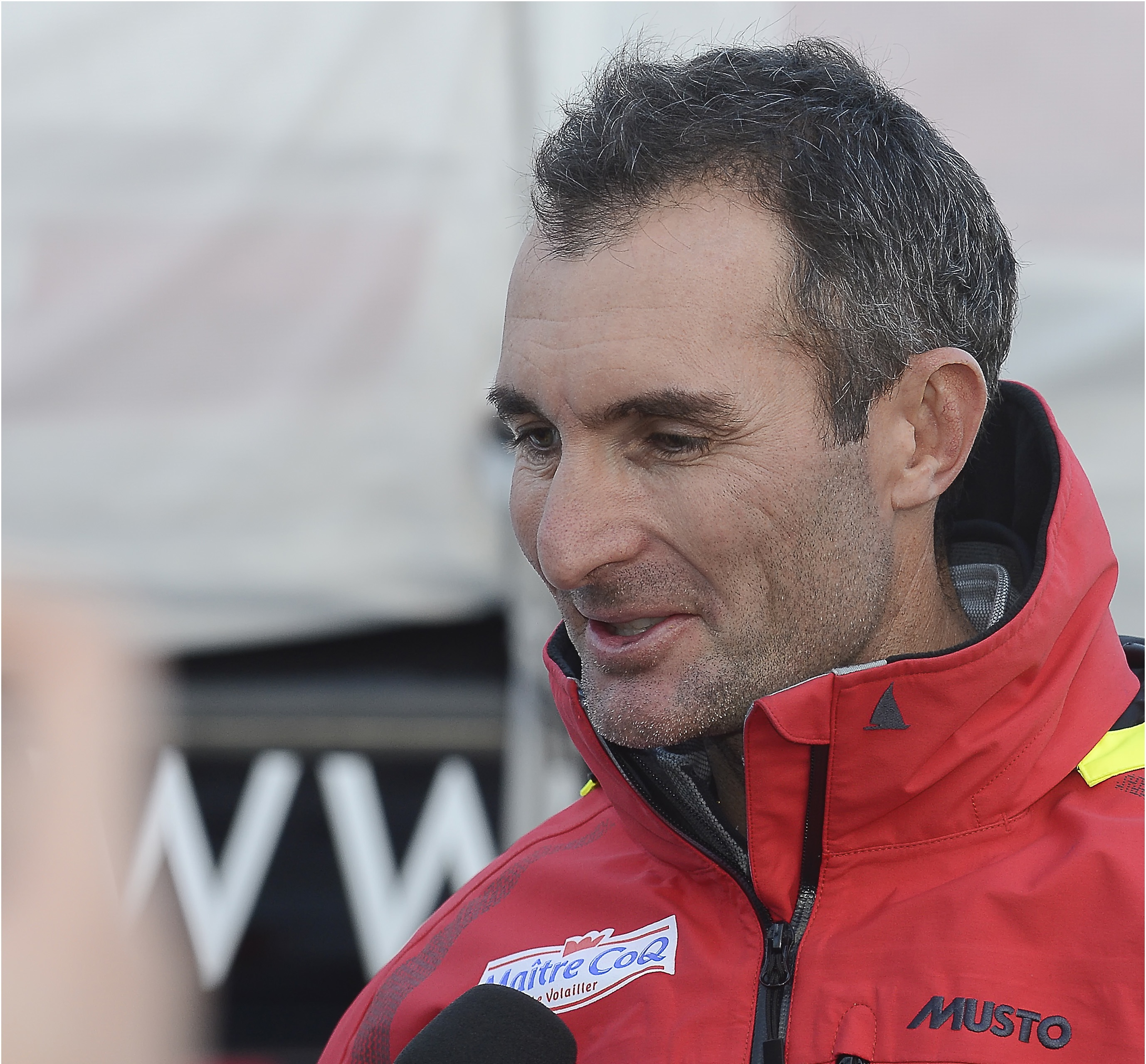
Jérémie Beyou (FRA)
Delta Dore

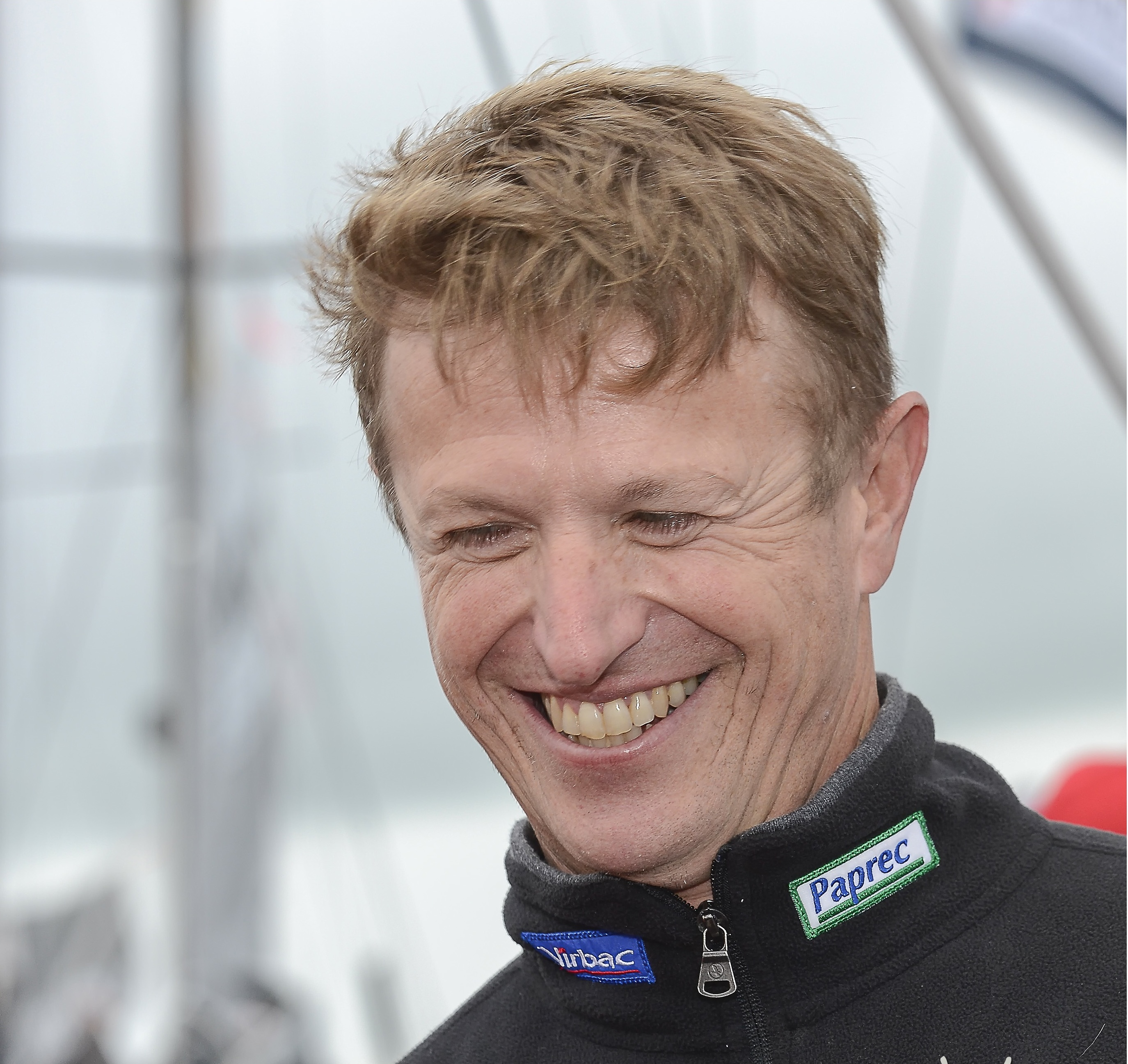
Jean-Pierre Dick (FRA)
Paprec-Virbac 2

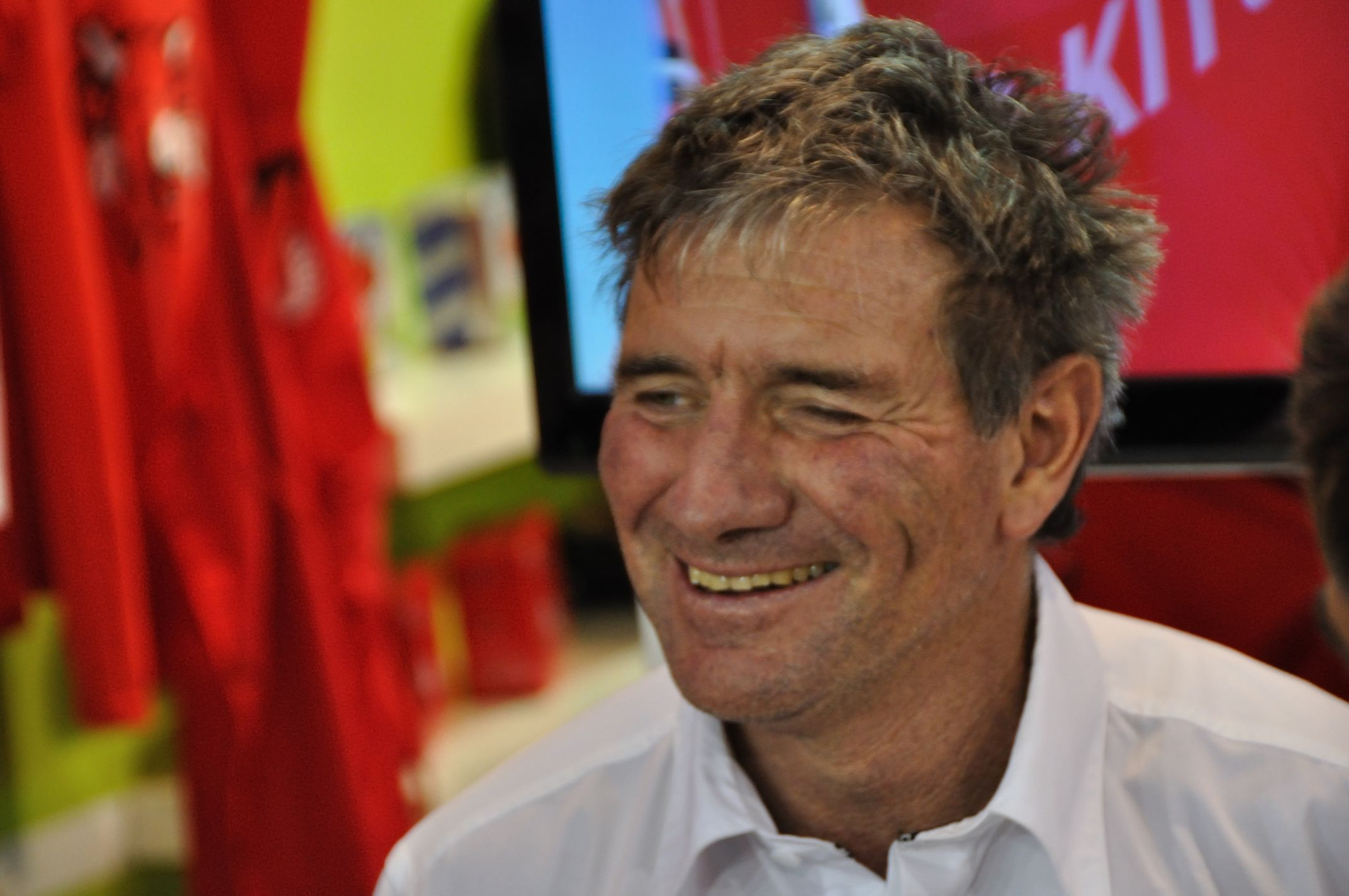
Kito de Pavant (FRA)
Groupe Bel

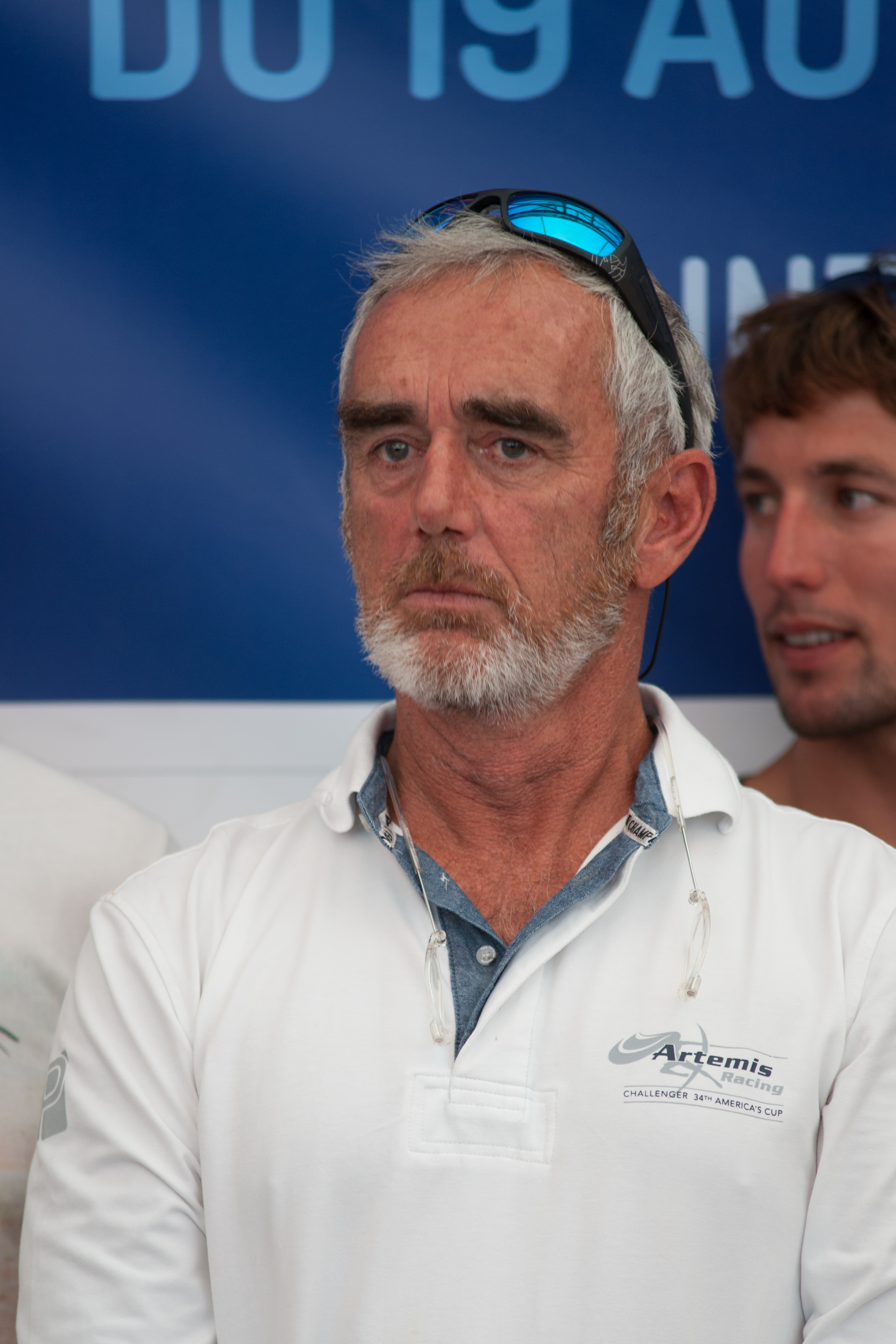
Loïck Peyron (FRA)
Gitana Eighty

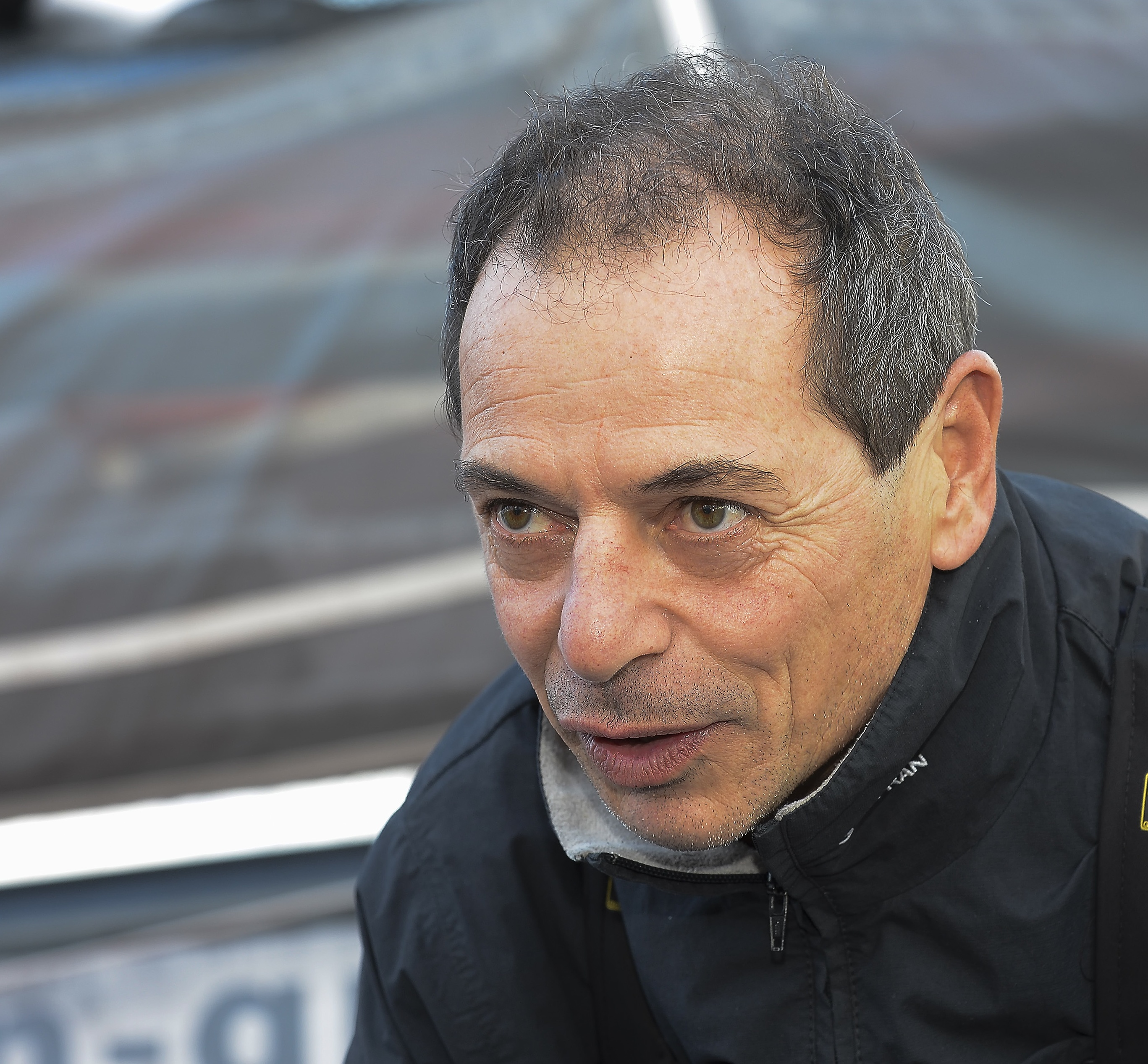
Marc Guillemot (FRA)
Safran (2)

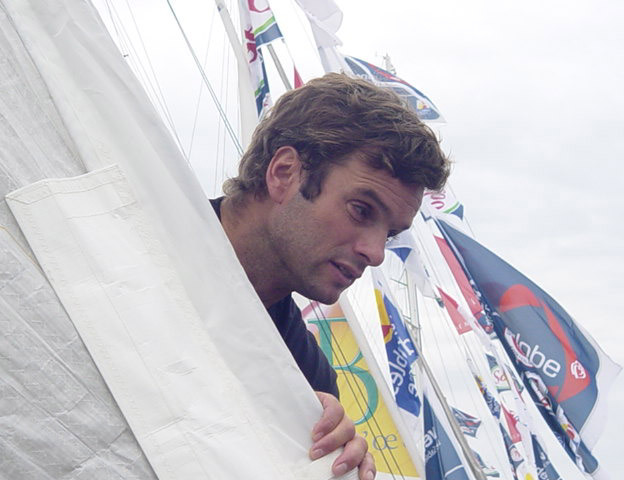
Marc Thiercelin (FRA)
DCNS

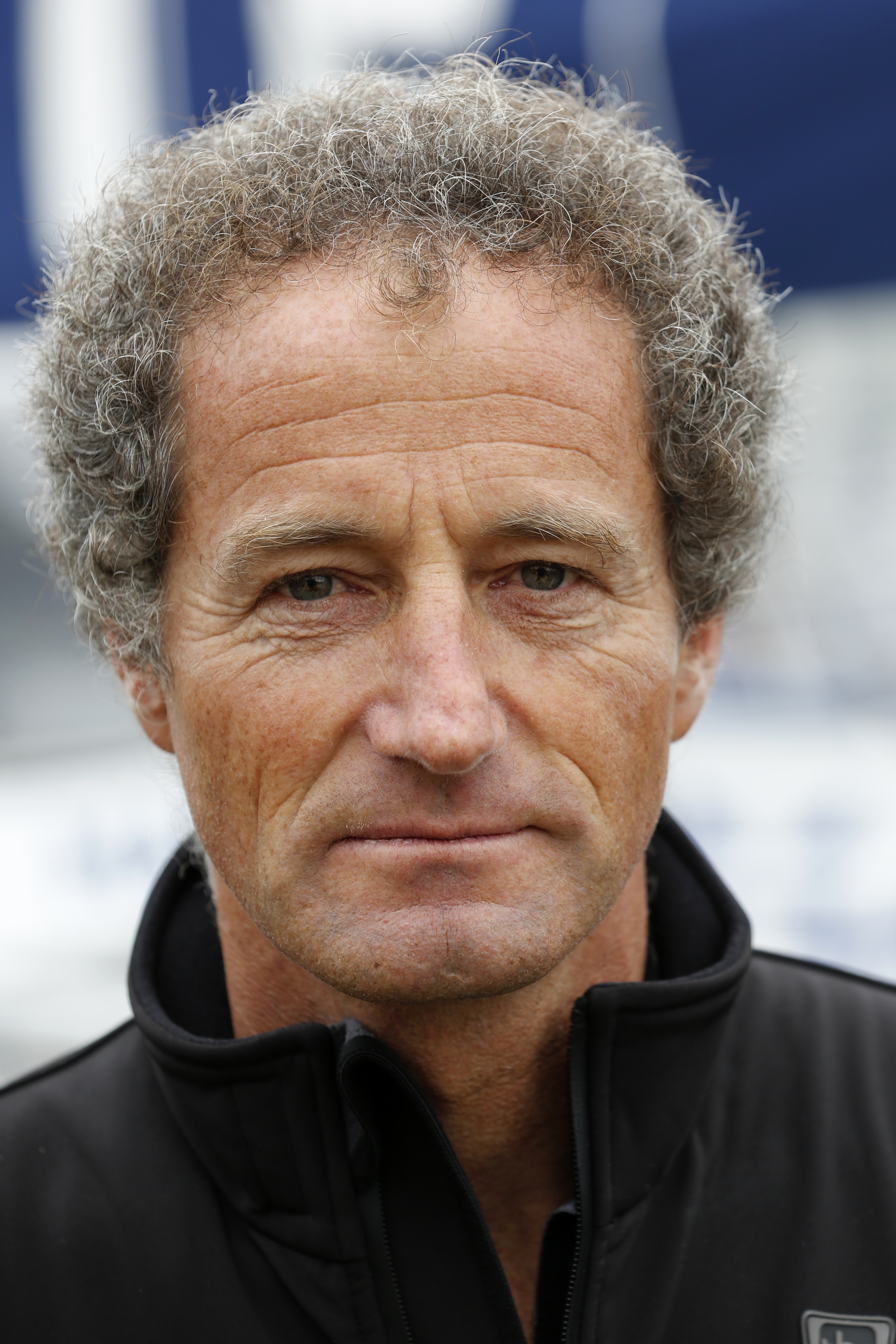
Michel Desjoyeaux (FRA)
Foncia

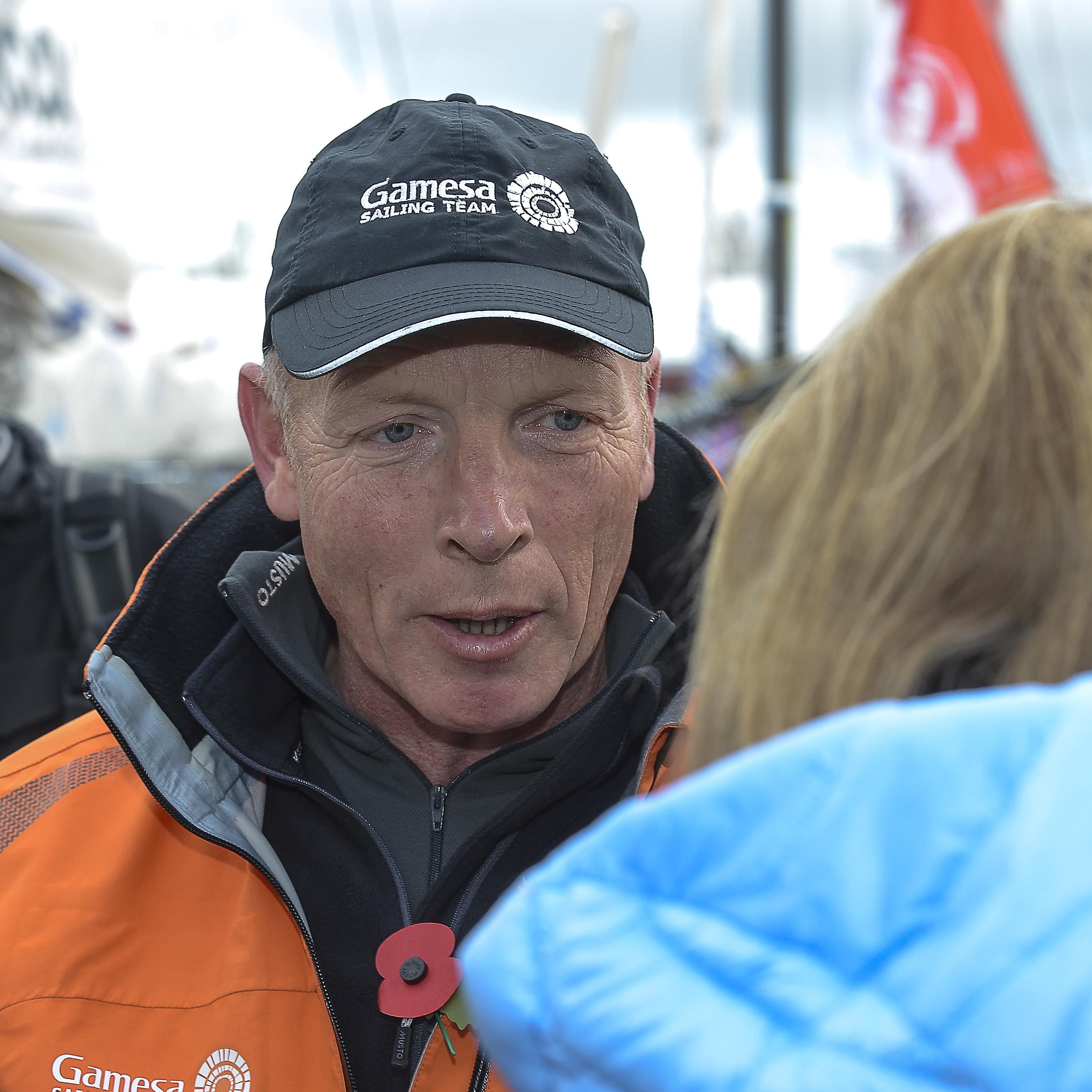
Mike Golding (GBR)
Ecover 3

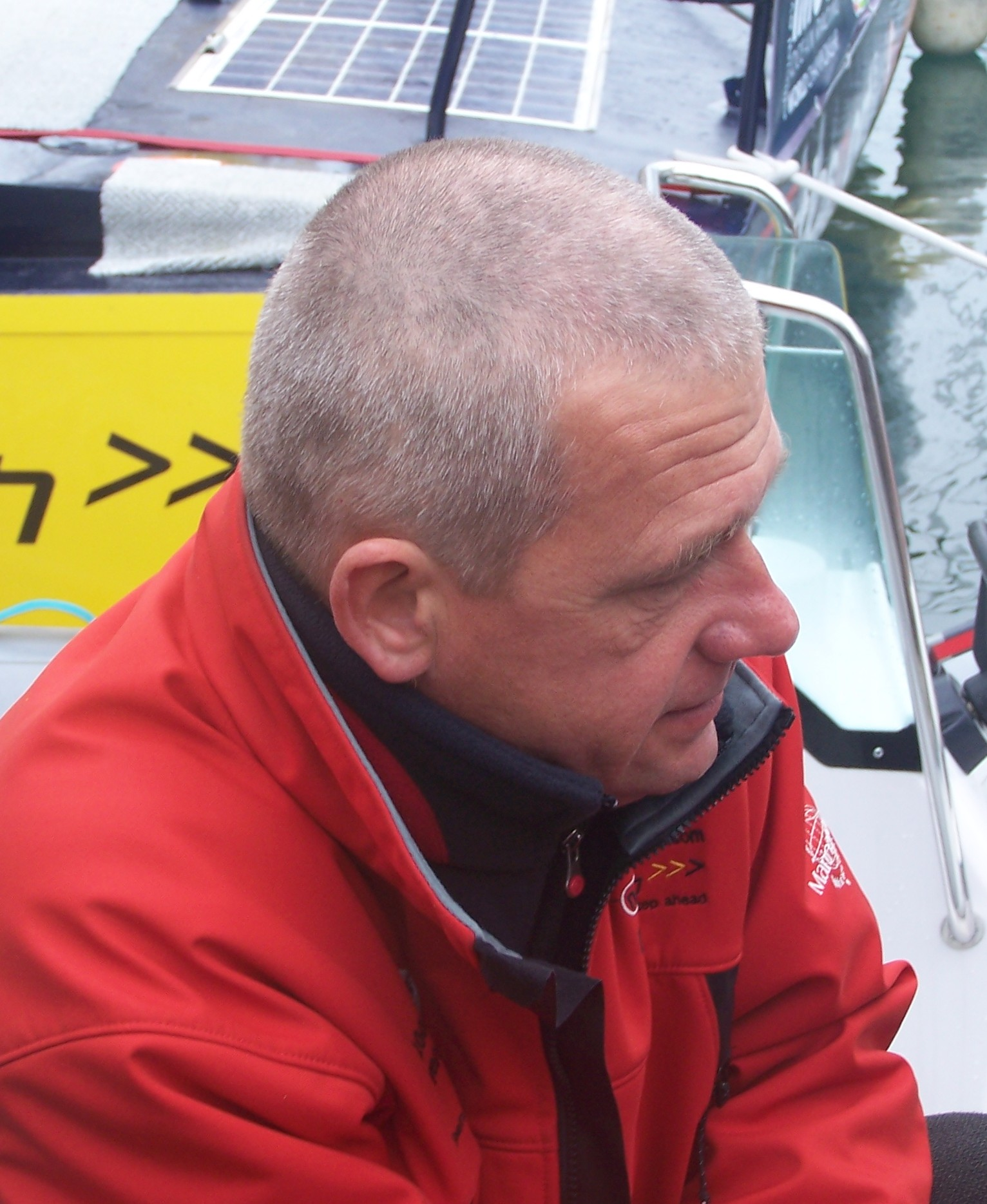
Norbert Sedlacek (AUT)
Nauticsport-Kapsch

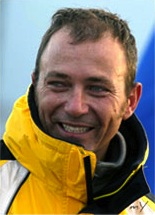
Raphaël Dinelli (FRA)
Fondation Ocean Vital

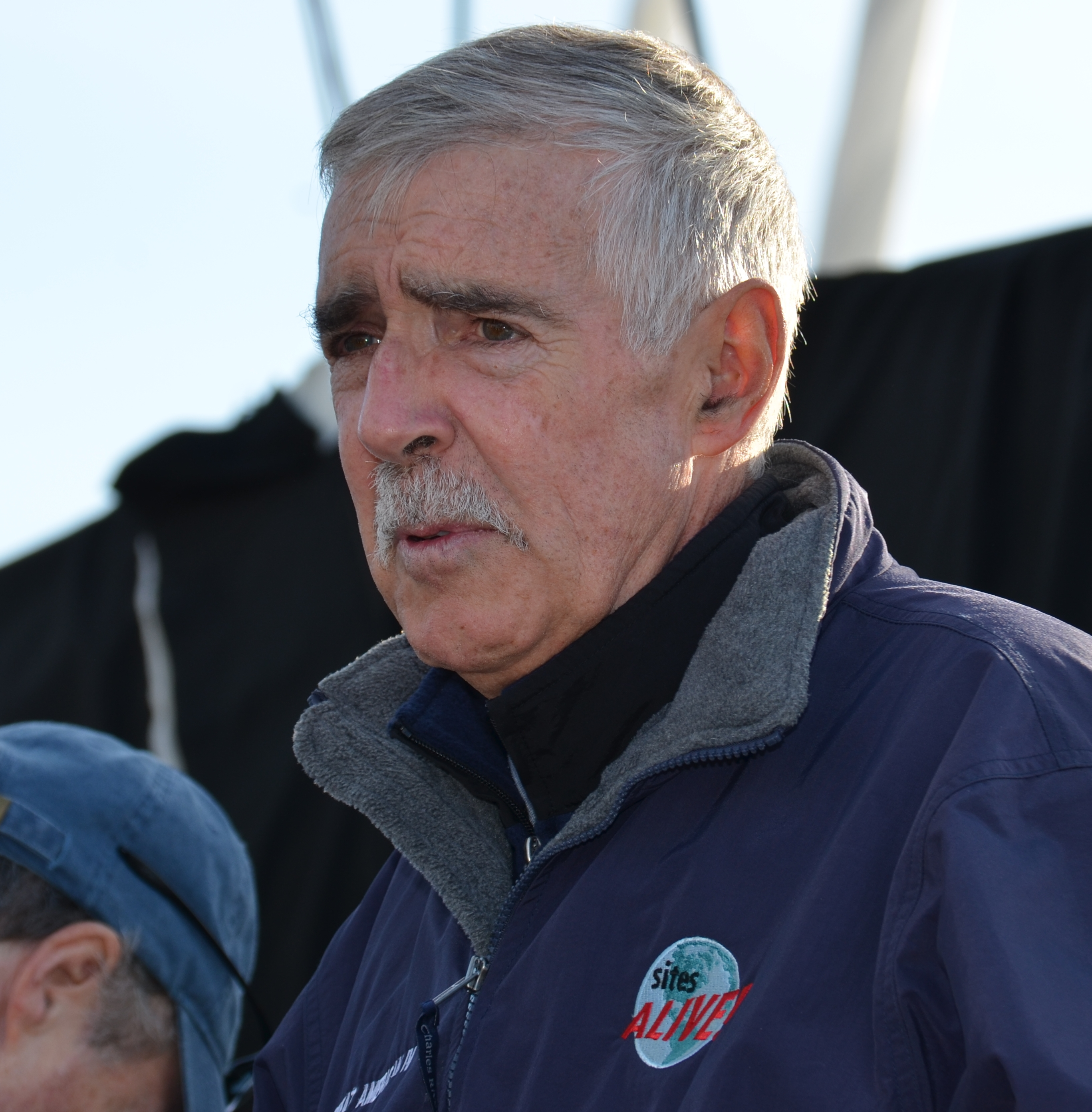
Rich Wilson (USA)
Great American III

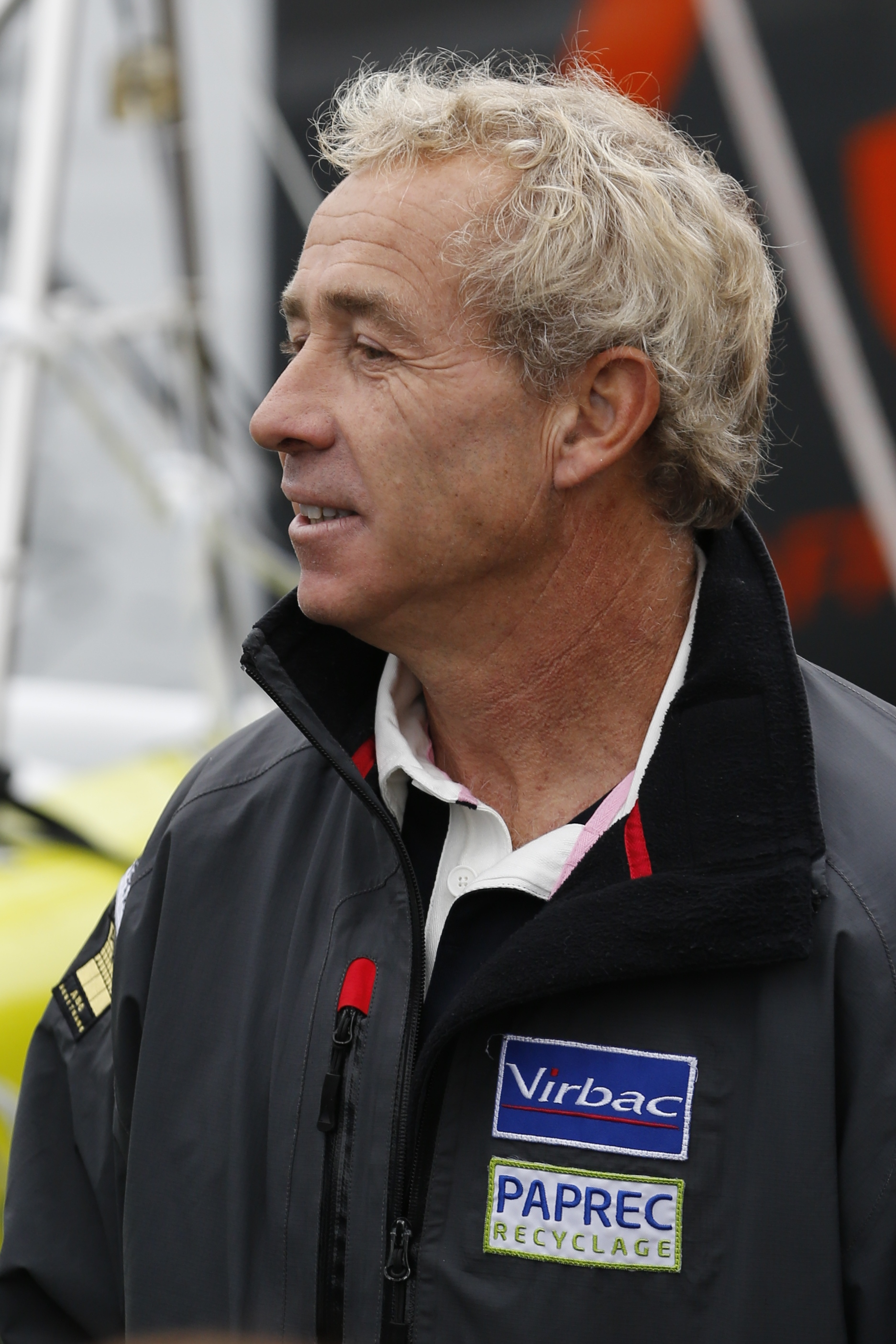
Roland Jourdain (FRA)
Veolia Environnement

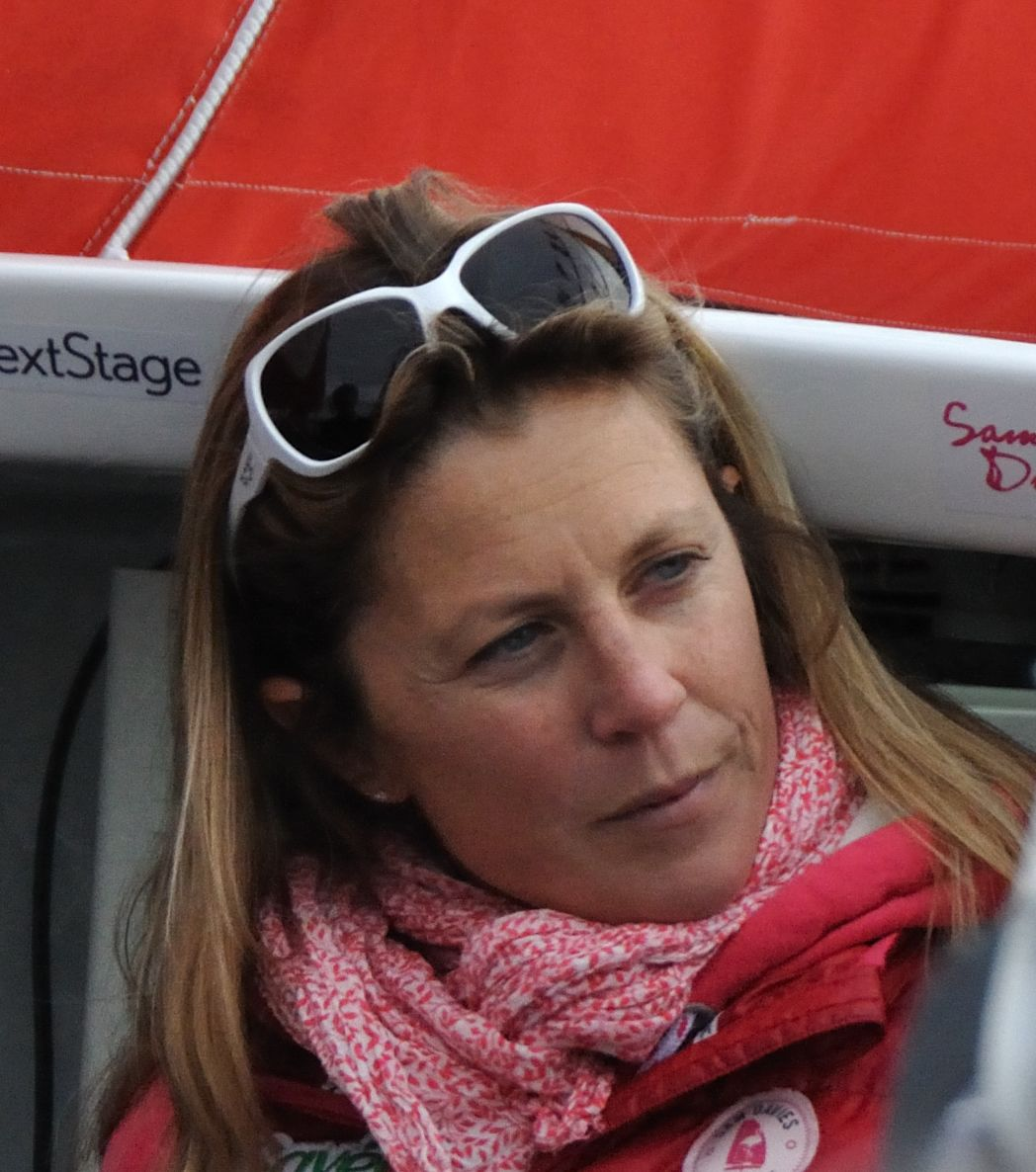
Samantha Davies (GBR)
Roxy

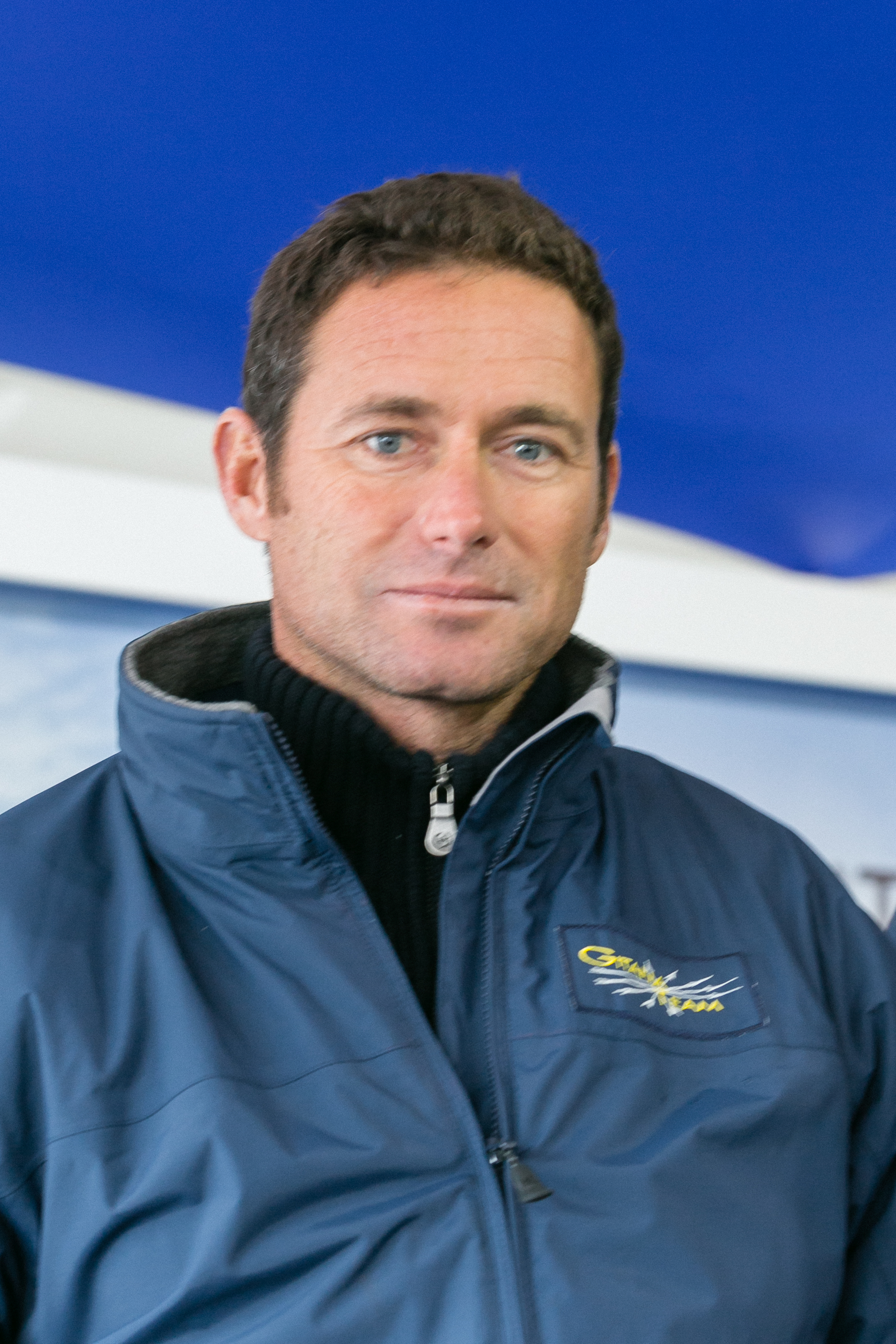
Sébastien Josse (FRA)
BT

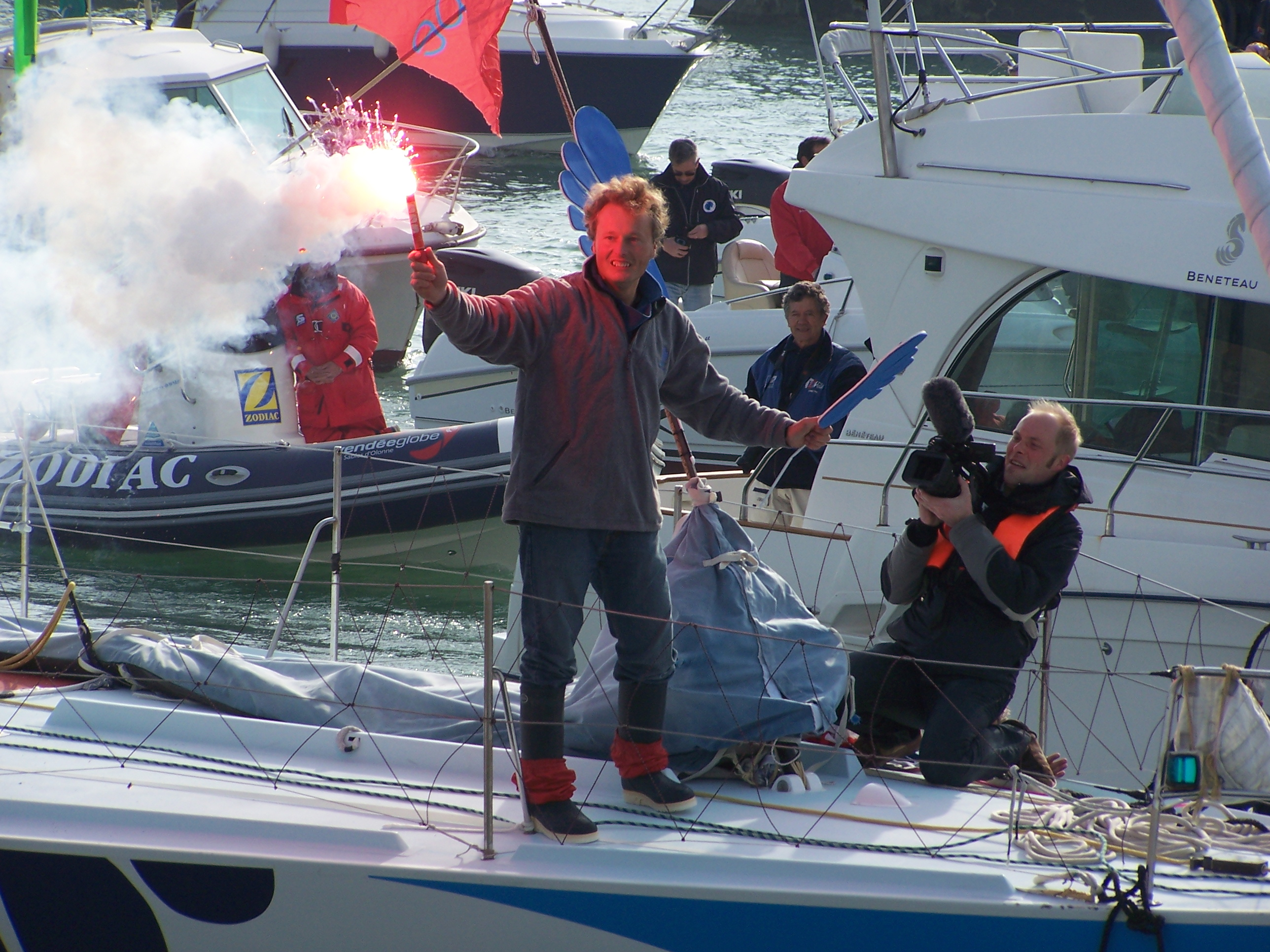
Steve White (GBR)
Toe In The Water

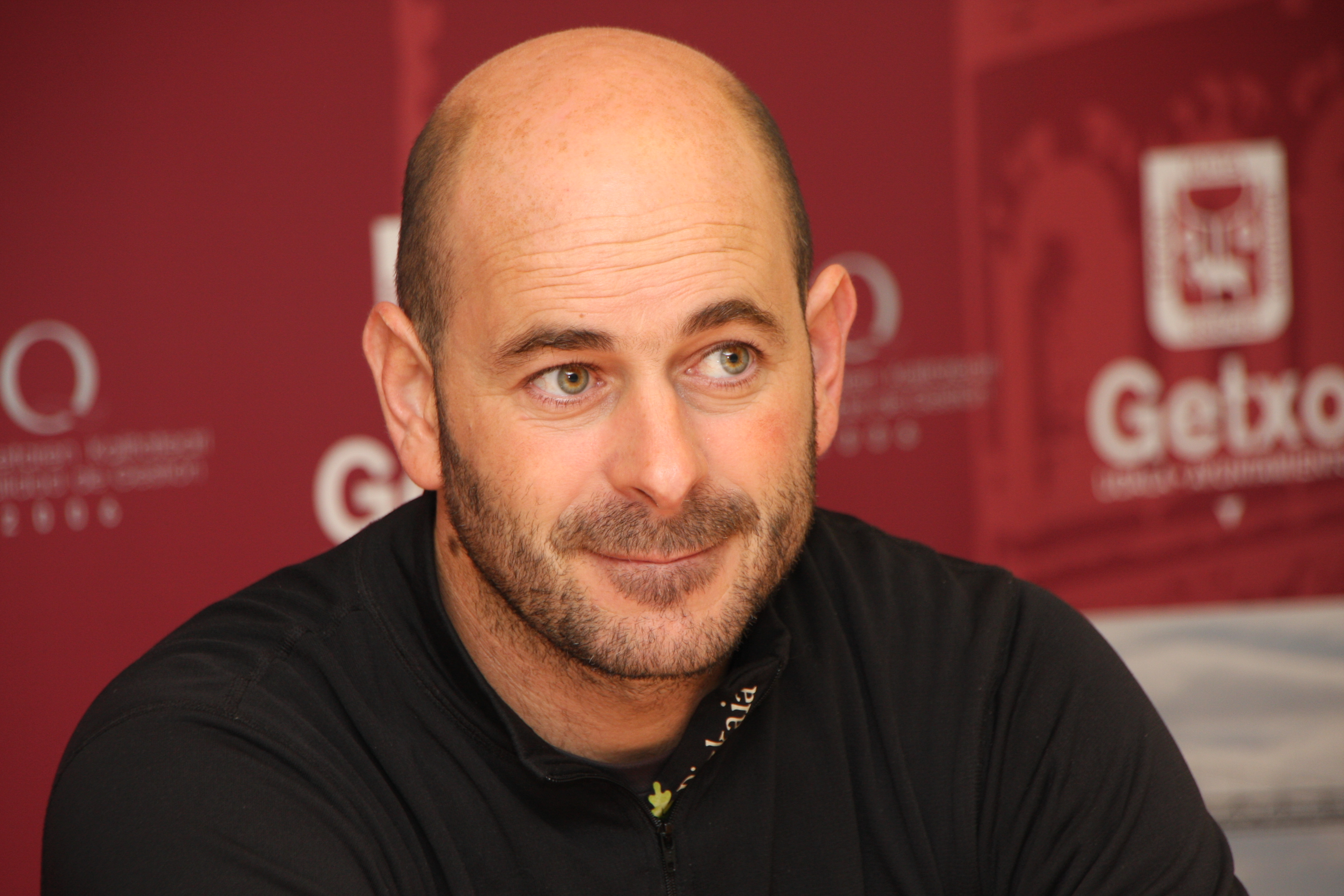
Unai Basurko (ESP)
Pakea Bizkaia

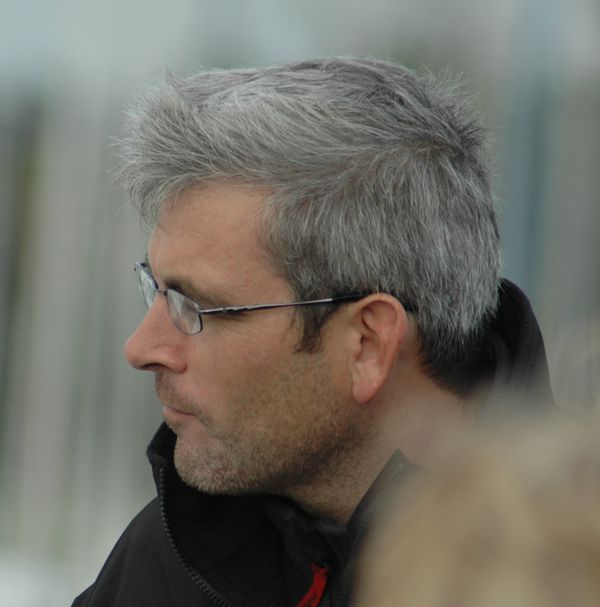
Vincent Riou (FRA)
PRB 3

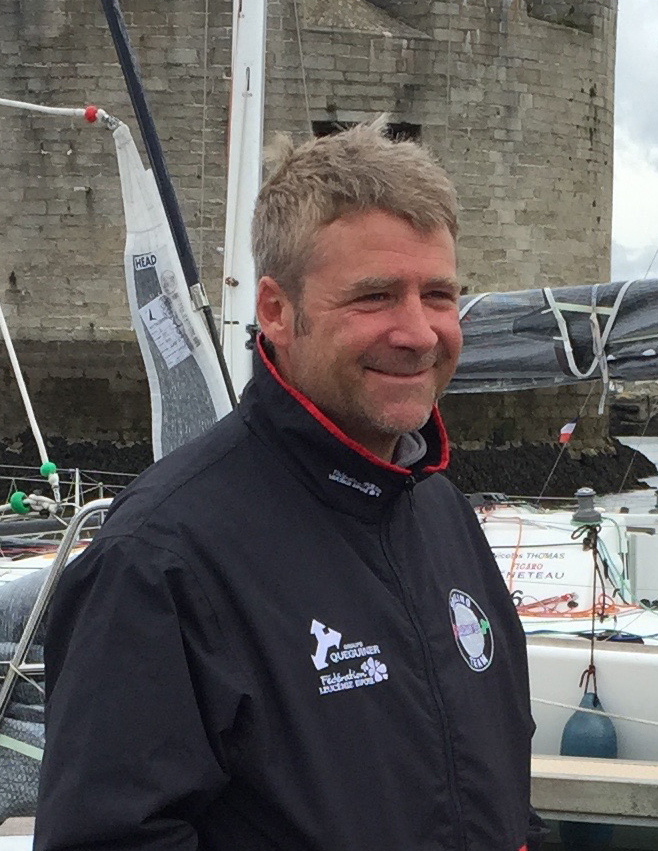
Yann Eliès (FRA)
Generali

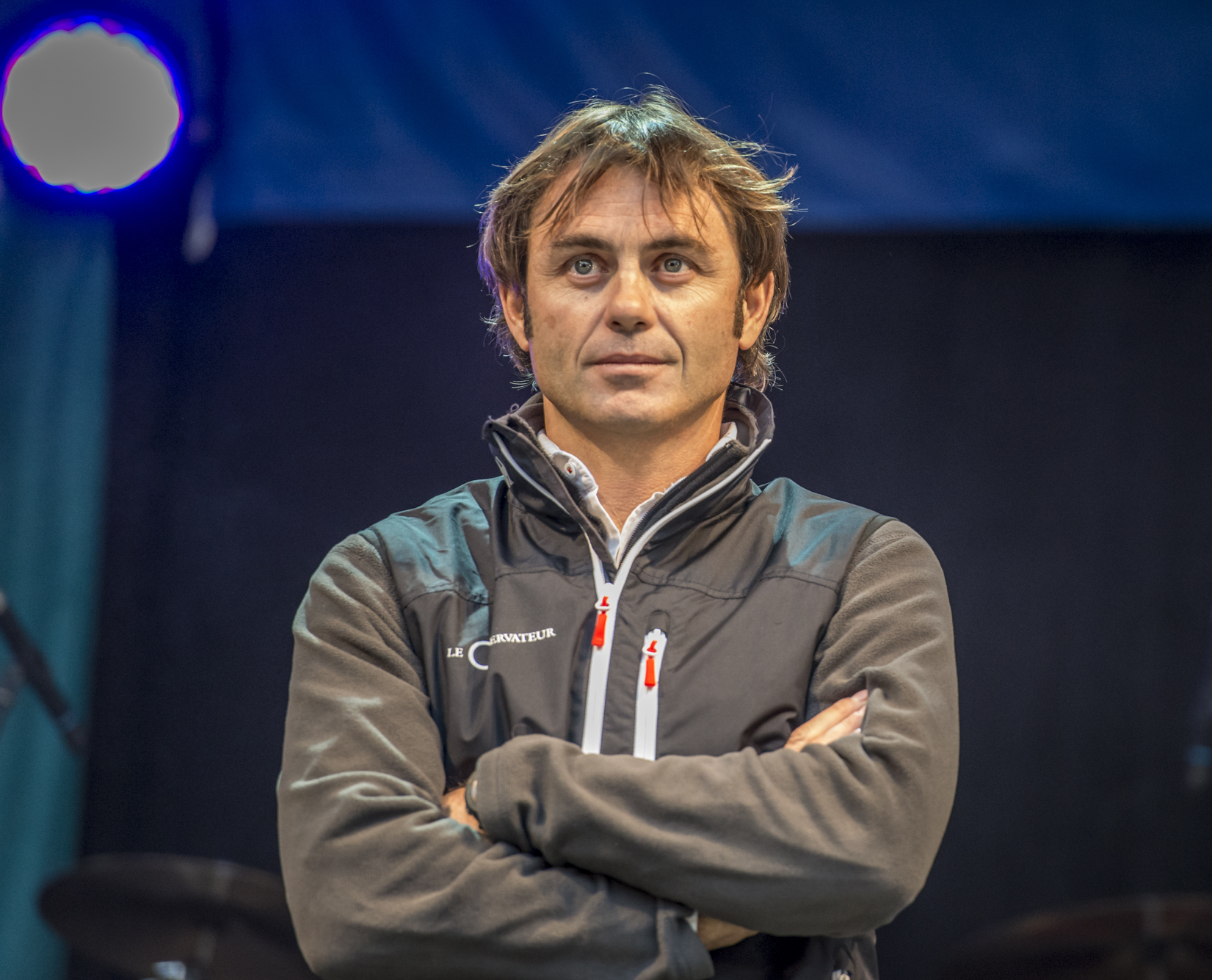
Yannick Bestaven (FRA)
Aquarelle.com – Charente Maritime

=== Participant facts equipment ===
Thirty skippers started the race a qualification passage was required to validate the registration of each boat, this course could have been carried out as part of another sailing race.

List of participants and equipment used
Skipper	Prev. participation (Start/Finish)	Name of boat	Sail no.	Naval architect	Builder	Launch date	Ref.
Alex Thomson (GBR)	1 / 0	Hugo Boss 2	GBR 99	Finot-Conq	Carrington/Hutton (Lymington, GBR)	2007	
Armel Le Cléac’h (FRA)	0 / 0	Brit Air	FRA 62	Finot-Conq	Multiplast	2007	
Arnaud Boissières (FRA)	0 / 0	Akena Vérandas	FRA 14	Finot-Conq	Kirié	1998	
Bernard Stamm (SUI)	1 / 0	Cheminées Poujoulat (3)	SUI 7	Farr Yacht Design	Cookson Boats (NZL)	2003	
Brian Thompson (GBR)	0 / 0	Bahrain Team Pindar	GBR 32	Juan Kouyoumdjian	Cookson Boats	2007	
Dee Caffari (GBR)	0 / 0	Aviva	GBR 222	Owen Clarke Design Group	Hakes Marine (NZL)	2008	
Derek Hatfield (CAN)	0 / 0	Algimouss-Spirit of Canada	CAN 84	Owen Clarke Design Group	Ocean Challenges	2007	
Dominique Wavre (SUI)	2 / 2 (4th)	Temenos II	SUI 9	Owen Clarke Design Group	Southern Ocean Marine (NZL)	2006	
Jean Le Cam (FRA)	1 / 1 (2nd)	VM Matériaux	FRA 118	Marc Lombard	JMV Industries (FRA)	2004	
Jean-Baptiste Dejeanty (FRA)	0 / 0	Groupe Maisonneuve	FRA 8	Angelo Lavranos – Artech Design Team	Artech	2005	
Jean-Pierre Dick (FRA)	1 / 1 (6th)	Paprec-Virbac 2	FRA 06	Farr Yacht Design	Southern Ocean Marine (NZL)	2007	
Jérémie Beyou (FRA)	0 / 0	Delta Dore	FRA 35	Farr Yacht Design	JMV Industries (FRA)	2006	
Jonny Malbon (GBR)	0 / 0	Artemis 2	GBR 100	Rogers Yacht Design Ltd	Hutton (GBR)	2008	
Kito de Pavant (FRA)	0 / 0	Groupe Bel	FRA 360	VPLP-Verdier	Indiana Yachting (ITA)	2007	
Loïck Peyron (FRA)	2 / 1 (2nd)	Gitana Eighty	FRA 80	Farr Yacht Design	Southern Ocean Marine (New Zealand)	2007	
Marc Guillemot (FRA)	0 / 0	Safran (2)	FRA 25	VPLP-Verdier	Larros – Thierry Eluère	2007	
Marc Thiercelin (FRA)	3 / 2 (2nd)	DCNS	FRA 1000	Finot-Conq	Multiplast (coque et intégration), Chantier naval de Larros (pont)	2008	
Michel Desjoyeaux (FRA)	1 / 1 (1st)	Foncia	FRA 101	Farr Yacht Design	CDK Technologies	2007	
Mike Golding (GBR)	2 / 2 (3rd)	Ecover 3	GBR 03	Owen Clarke Design Group	Hakes Marine (Wellington, NZL)	2007	
Norbert Sedlacek (AUT)	1 / 0	Nauticsport-Kapsch	AUT 36	Joubert-Nivelt-Sedlacek	Garcia / N. Sedlacek	1995 / 2003	
Raphaël Dinelli (FRA)	3 / 1 (12th)	Fondation Océan Vital	FRA 77	Nándor Fa	Fa Hajó	1996	
Rich Wilson (USA)	0 / 0	Great American III	USA 37	Nivelt	Thierry Dubois	1999	
Roland Jourdain (FRA)	2 / 1 (3rd)	Véolia Environnement	FRA 29	Marc Lombard	JMV Industries	2004	
Steve White (GBR)	0 / 0	Toe In The Water	GBR 55	Finot-Conq	JMV Industries	1998	
Samantha Davies (GBR)	0 / 0	Roxy	FRA 40	Finot-Conq	MAG France Fontenay le Comte	2000	
Sébastien Josse (FRA)	1 / 1 (5th)	BT	EUR 888	Farr Yacht Design	Offshore Challenges, Cowes, GBR	2007	
Unaï Basurko (ESP)	0 / 0	Pakea Bizkaia	ESP 26	Murray-Burns & Dovell	Jarkan – Kanga Birtles	2005	
Vincent Riou (FRA)	1 / 1 (1st)	PRB 3	FRA 85	Farr Yacht Design	CDK Technologies	2006	
Yannick Bestaven (FRA)	0 / 0	Aquarelle.com – Charente Maritime	FRA 01	Finot-Conq	Thierry Eluère	1996	
Yann Éliès (FRA)	0 / 0	Generali	FRA 22	Finot-Conq	Multiplast	2007	
