= Unai Basurko =

French offshore sailor and navigator

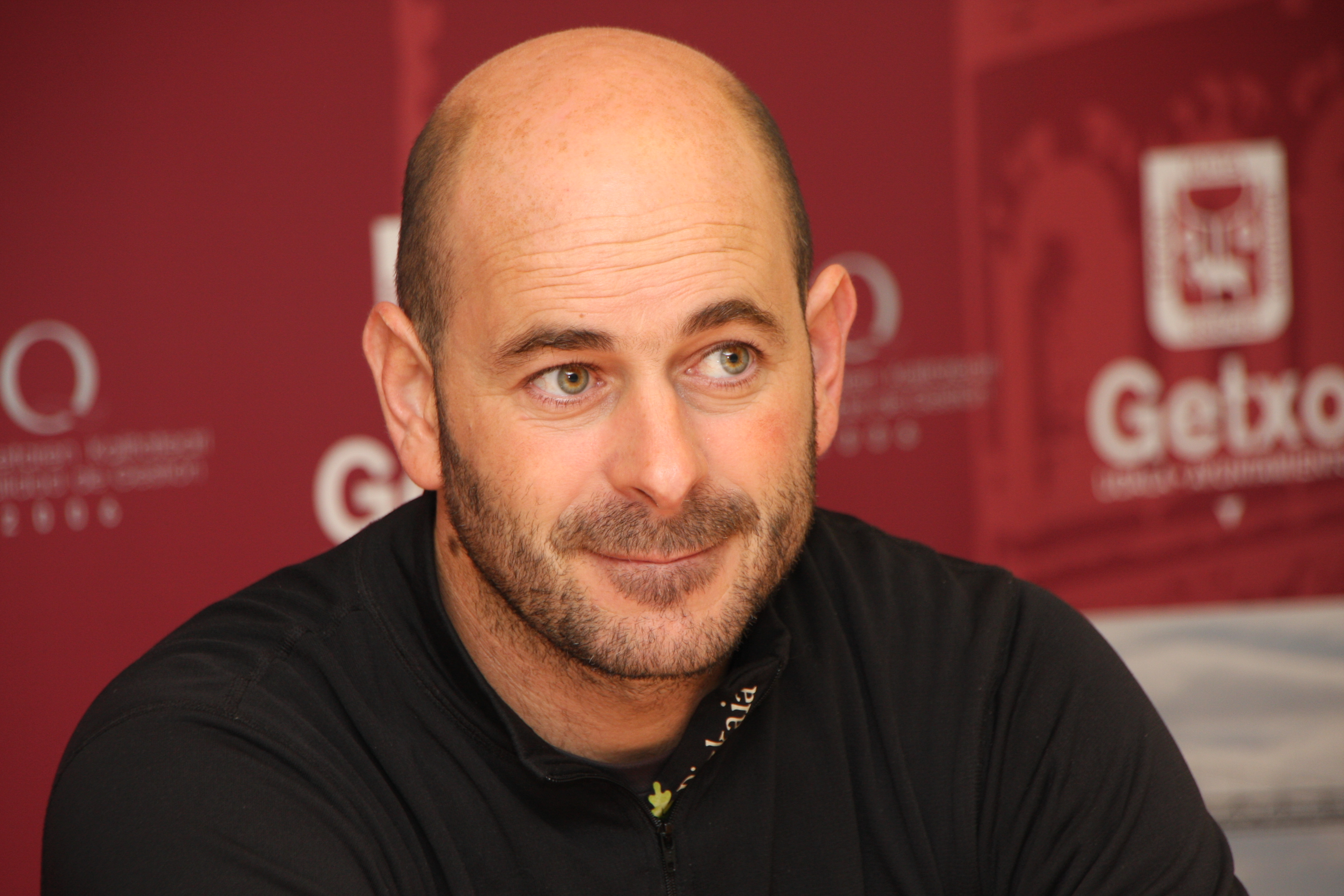

Personal information
- Nationality: Spanish
- Born: 2 April 1973 (age 53) Portugalete

Sailing career
- Sport: Sailing

Unai Basurko is a Spanish professional sailor born on 2 April 1973 in Portugalete which is on the Biscay.

He is a participant of the 2008–2009 Vendée Globe retired during the first part of the race going down the Atlantic Ocean due to a broken rudder.

== Results ==
2009

- Pakea Bizkaia The Solitaire du Figaro.

1997:

- 1st of the Commodores Cup

1998:

- 1st plymouth Regatte-San Sebascion
- 1st of the Trans-Tasman Race
- Tour of Spain sailing

1999:

- 2nd World IMS Championships

2003:

- Solitaire du Figaro

2004:

- Bilbar record (Bilbao-Barcelona)

2007:

- 15th in the Transat Jacques-Vabre in the IMOCA category on Pakea Bizkaia 2003 with Gonzalo Gandarias
- 3rd of the Velux 5 Oceans Race onboard IMOCA 60 – Pakea-Bizkaia

2008

- RET 2008–2009 Vendée Globe onboard IMOCA 60 - Pakea-Bizkaia
