= IMOCA 60 Gartmore =

Round the World Offshore Racing Yachts

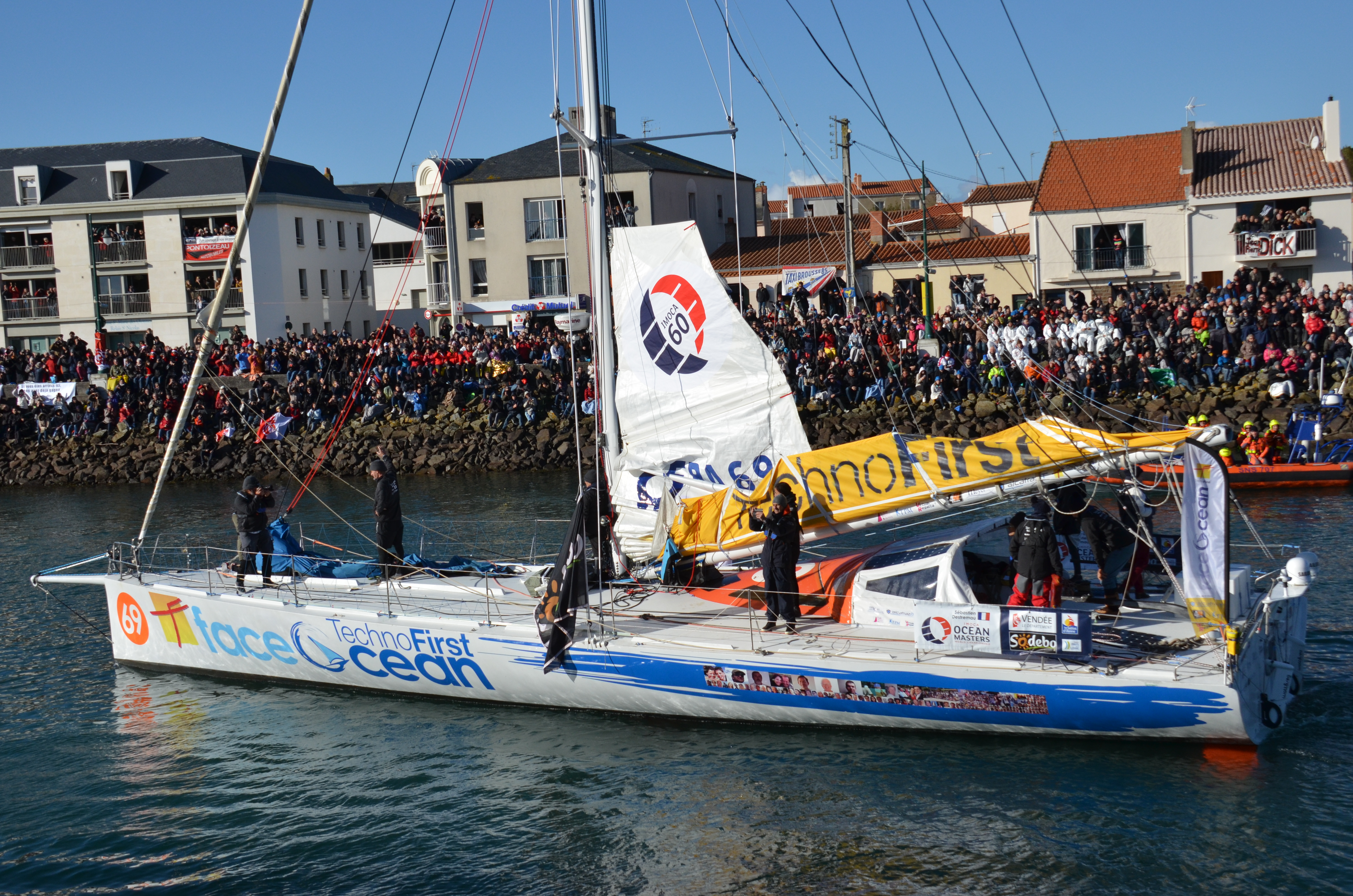

Development
- Designer: Group Finot, Finot-Conq
- Year: 1 June 1998
- Builder: JMV Industries

Racing
- Class association: IMOCA 60

The IMOCA 60 class yacht Gartmore Investment, GBR 55 was a development class monohull sailing yacht designed by Finot-Conq, made by JMV Industries in Cherbourg, France, and launched in May 1998. Note during 1996-1997 the IMOCA 60 Coyote was branded Gartmore while this boat was being built.

== Racing results ==
Pos	Year	Race	Class	Boat name	Skipper	Notes	Ref
Round the world races
18 / 30	2017	2016–2017 Vendée Globe	IMOCA 60	Techno First–face Ocean, FRA 69	Sébastien Destremau (FRA)	124d 12h 38m	
8 / 30	2009	2008–2009 Vendée Globe	IMOCA 60	Toe in The Water	Steve White (GBR)	109d 00h 36m	
4 / 6	2003	Around Alone Race	IMOCA 60	Pindar	Emma Richards (GBR)	131d 21h	
9 / 24	2001	2000–2001 Vendée Globe	IMOCA 60	RBP Gartmore	Josh Hall (GBR)	111d 19h	
DNF	1998	Around Alone Race	IMOCA 60	Gartmore	Josh Hall (GBR)	Broke Mast	
Transatlantic Races
2 / 17	2018	Route De Rhum	IMOCA 60	Alacatraz IT - Faceocean	Sébastien Destremau (FRA)	17d 07h 25m	
DNF	2003	Transat Jacques Vabre	IMOCA 60	OBJECTIF 3	Javier Sanso (ESP); Charles Hedrich (FRA)		
4 / 12	2001	Transat Jacques Vabre	IMOCA 60	SME - NEGOCEANE	Javier Sanso (ESP); Eric Dumont (FRA)	17d 01h 23m	
7	1999	Transat Jacques Vabre	IMOCA 60	Gartmore	Josh Hall (GBR)		
Other Races
