= Steve White (sailor) =

French offshore sailor and navigator

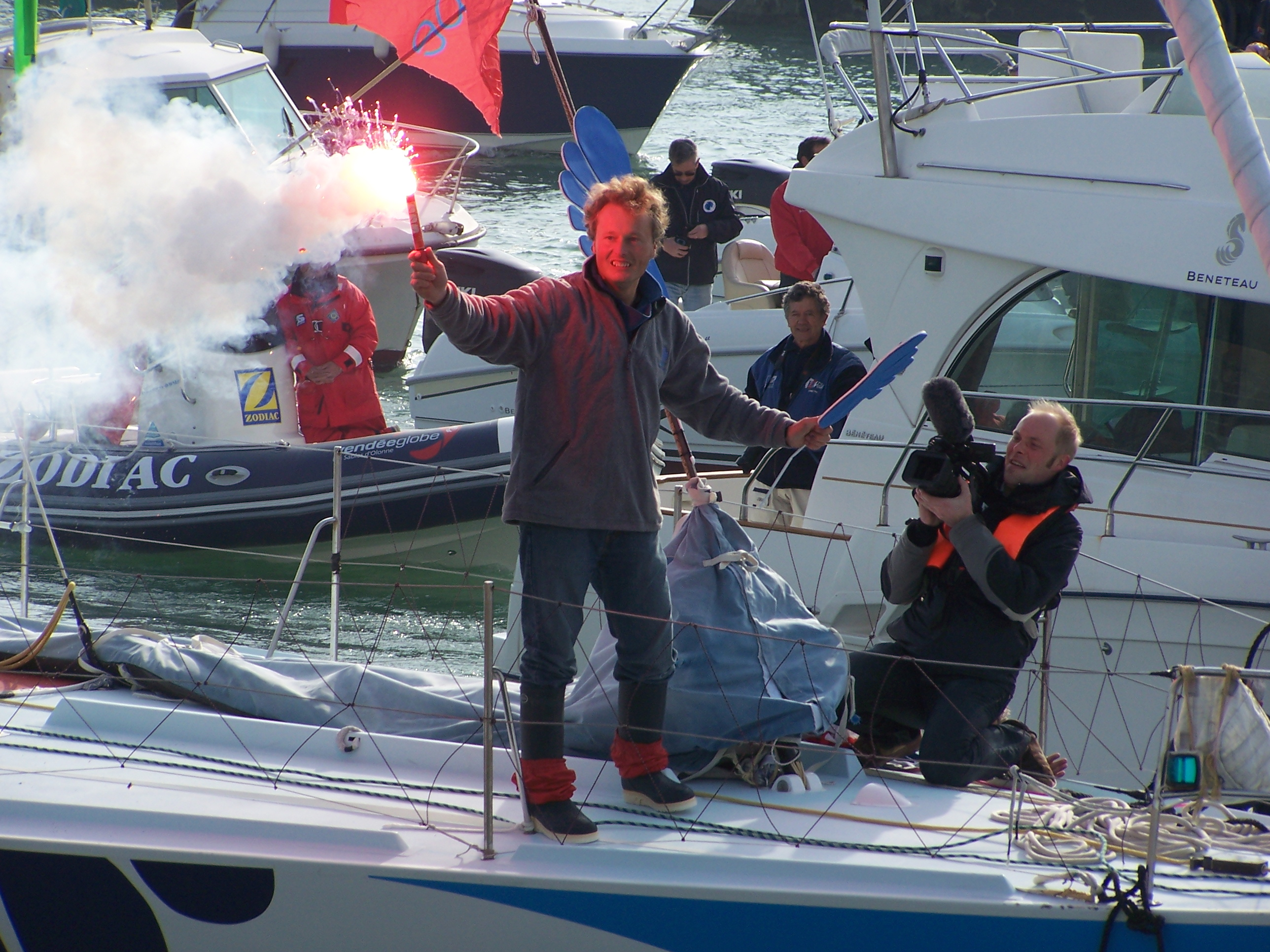

Personal information
- Nationality: British
- Born: 1972 (age 53–54)

Sailing career
- Sport: Sailing

Steve White is a British skipper born in 1972 he finished 8th in the 2008-2009 Vendée Globe

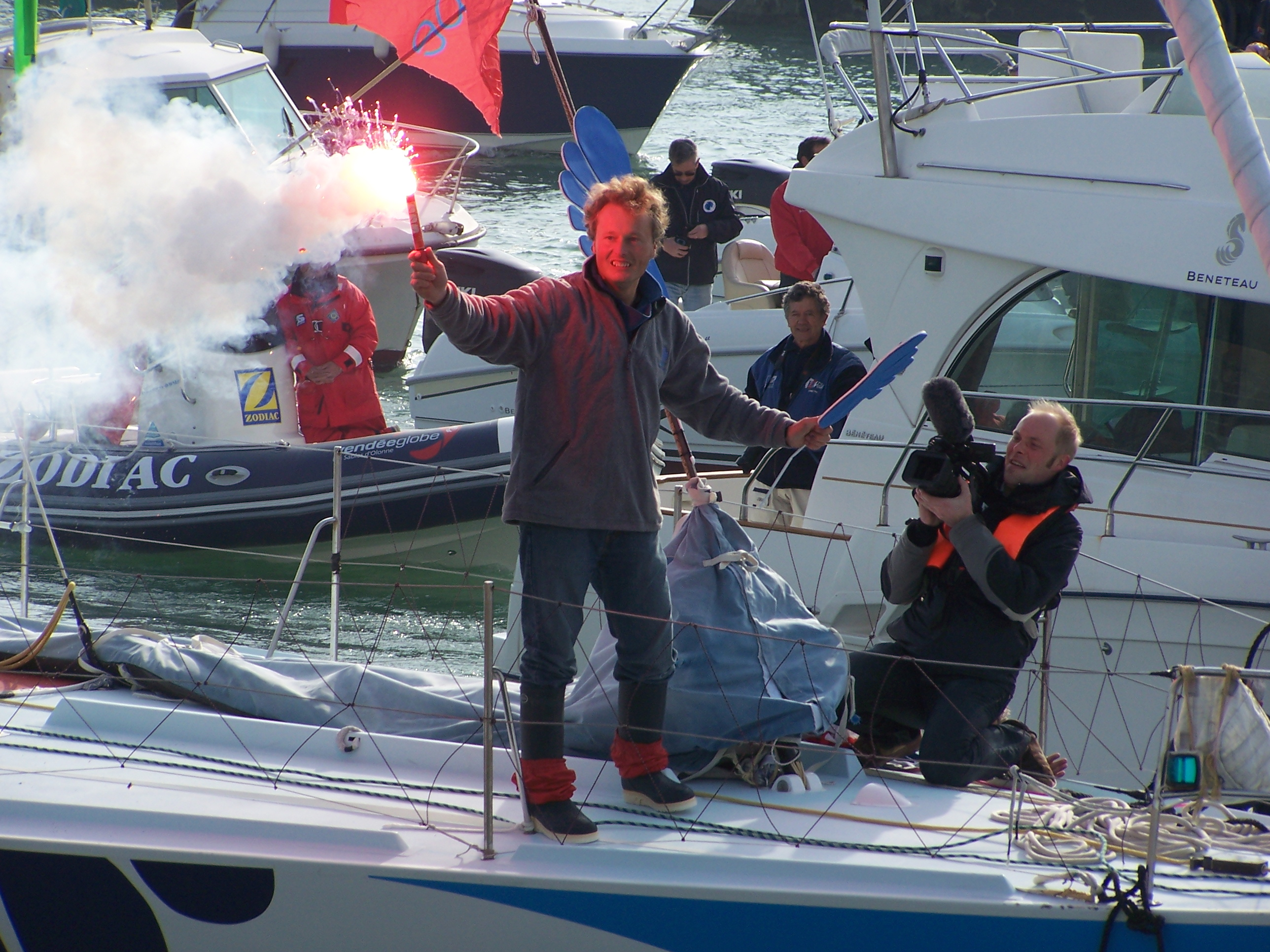

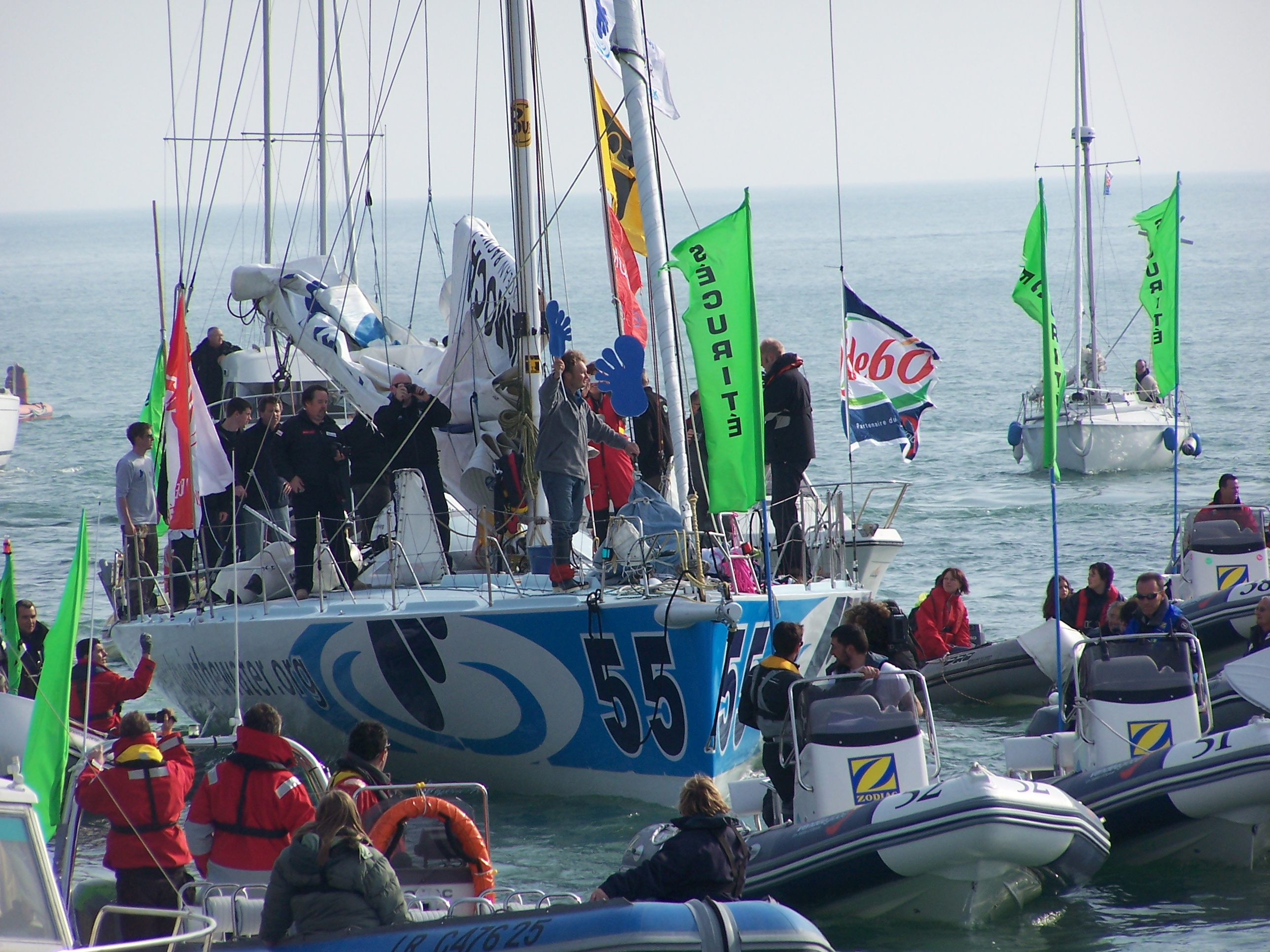
