= Jonny Malbon =

French offshore sailor and navigator

Personal information
- Nationality: British
- Born: 11 July 1974 (age 51)

Sailing career
- Sport: Sailing

Jonny Malbon is a British professional sailor.

== Personal life ==
He was born on 11 July 1974. He earned a degree from Greenwich University.

== Career ==
He clocked up more than 300,000 miles sailing the world oceans. He worked alongside Chay Blyth on the BT Global Challenge where he was in charge of crew training. He gained experience of IMOCA 60's by doing boat preparation for Mike Golding, Dee Caffari, Ellen MacArthur and Brian Thompson.

His sailing highlight was competing in the 2008-2009 Vendee Globe aboard Artimist Ocean Racing II. It was the only IMOCA 60 design by Simon Rodger. He had an eventful race that ended in him retired when he got to New Zealand due to severe mainsail damage. Before that he hit a whale.
