= Swan 43 =

Sailboat class

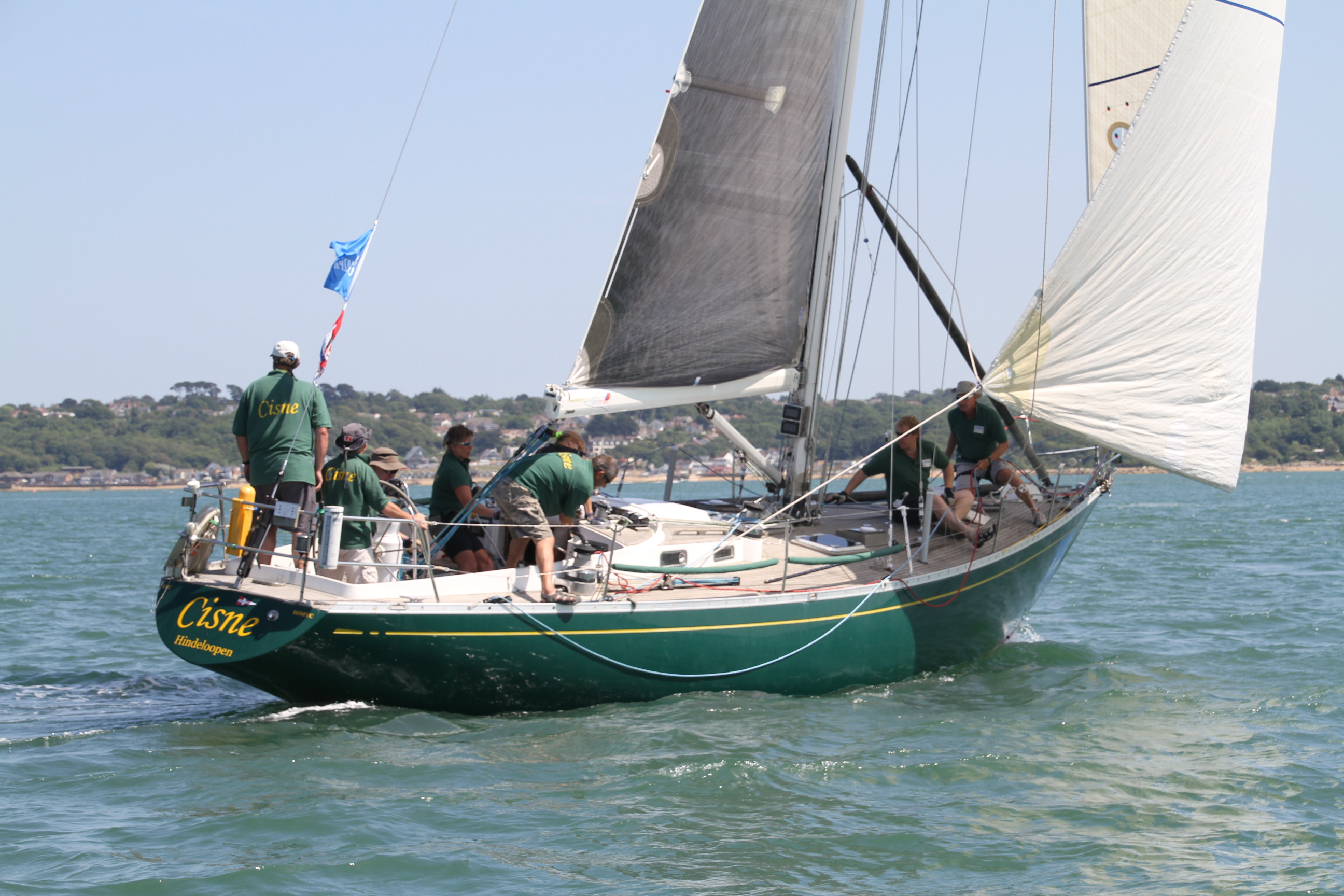

Development
- Designer: Olin Stephens of Sparkman & Stephens
- Location: Finland
- Year: 1967
- No. built: 67
- Builder: Oy Nautor AB
- Role: Cruiser-Racer
- Name: Swan 43

Boat
- Displacement: 19,850 lb (9,004 kg)
- Draft: 7.16 ft (2.18 m)

Hull
- Type: monohull
- Construction: glassfibre
- LOA: 42.78 ft (13.04 m)
- LWL: 31.00 ft (9.45 m)
- Beam: 11.67 ft (3.56 m)
- Engine: Volvo Penta MD2B 25 hp (19 kW) diesel engine

Hull appendages
- Keel: fin keel
- Ballast: 10,400 lb (4,717 kg)
- Rudder: Skeg-mounted rudder

Rig
- Rig type: Bermuda rig
- I foretriangle height: 51.54 ft (15.71 m)
- J foretriangle base: 17.54 ft (5.35 m)
- P mainsail luff: 46.04 ft (14.03 m)
- E mainsail foot: 16.04 ft (4.89 m)

Sails
- Sailplan: Masthead sloop
- Mainsail area: 369.24 sq ft (34.304 m^{2})
- Jib/genoa area: 452.01 sq ft (41.993 m^{2})
- Total sail area: 821.25 sq ft (76.297 m^{2})

Racing
- PHRF: 96-114

The Swan 43 is a Finnish sailboat that was designed by Olin Stephens of Sparkman & Stephens as a Royal Ocean Racing Club rule cruiser-racer and first built in 1967. The boat is Sparkman & Stephens' design #1973.

The design was originally marketed by the manufacturer as the Swan 43, but is now usually referred to as the Swan 43 S&S to differentiate it from the unrelated 1985 Swan 43 Holland design. It was also sold in the United States as the Palmer Johnson 43.

== Production ==
The design was built by Oy Nautor AB in Finland, from 1967 to 1982 and was the second boat built by the company. A total of 67 boats were completed over its 25-year production run, an average of 2.68 boats per year, but it is now out of production.

== Design ==
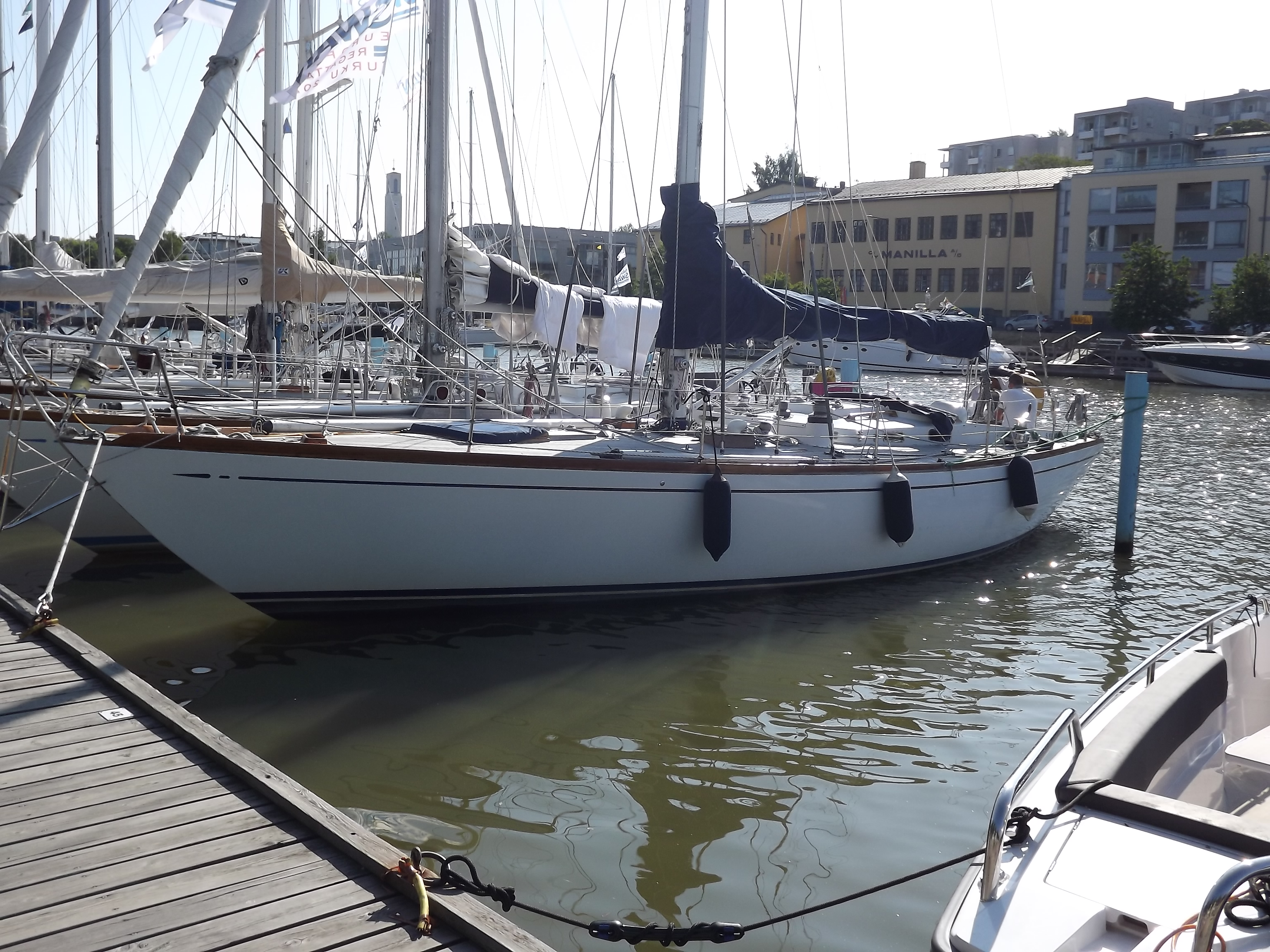
A Swan 43 showing the sharpley raked stem

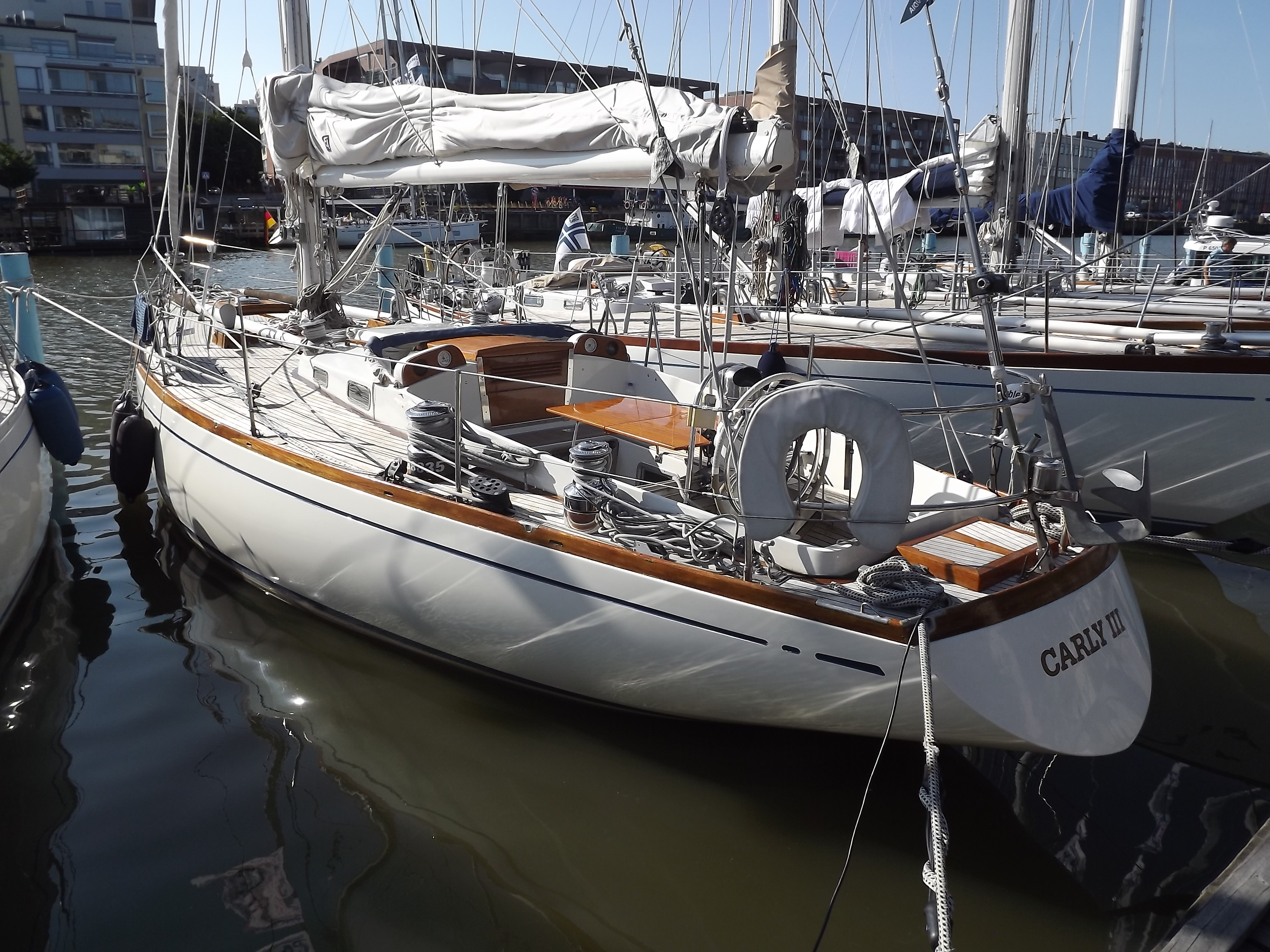
A Swan 43 showing the raised counter reverse transom and hull tumblehome

The Swan 43 is a recreational keelboat, built predominantly of glassfibre, with wood trim. It has a masthead sloop rig; a raked stem, a raised counter, reverse transom; a skeg-mounted rudder controlled by a wheel and a fixed, swept fin keel. It displaces 19,850 lb (9,004 kg) and carries 10,400 lb (4,717 kg) of lead ballast. The boat was delivered with a keel-mounted trim tab.

The boat has a draft of 7.16 ft (2.18 m) with the standard keel. A short mast was a factory option with a mast about 1 ft (0.30 m) lower than standard.

The boat is fitted with a Swedish Volvo Penta MD2B diesel engine of 25 hp (19 kW) for docking and manoeuvring. The fuel tank holds 40 U.S. gallons (150 L; 33 imp gal) and the fresh water tank has a capacity of 50 U.S. gallons (190 L; 42 imp gal).

The design has sleeping accommodation for eight people, with a double "V"-berth in the bow cabin, two straight settee berths and two pilot berths in the main cabin and an aft cabin, two single berths. The galley is located on the starboard side just forward of the companionway ladder. The galley is L-shaped and is equipped with a three-burner stove, an ice box and a sink. A navigation station is opposite the galley, on the port side. The head is located just aft of the bow cabin on the port side.

For sailing downwind the design may be equipped with a symmetrical spinnaker or an asymmetrical spinnaker.

The design has a hull speed of 7.46 kn (13.82 km/h) and a PHRF handicap of 96 to 114.

== Operational history ==
In a 2016 article on a Swan 43 restoration project for Yachting Monthly, Pip Hare wrote, "the Swan 43 was only the second Olin Stephens design to be produced at the Nautor's Swan yard, but its overhanging ends, short coachroof, low freeboard, sheer and tumblehome established the classic Swan lines."

== See also ==
- List of sailing boat types
