= IMOCA 60 L'Occitane =

IMOCA 60 Racing Yachts

Development
- Designer: Sam Manuard
- Year: 31 January 2020
- Builders: Black Pepper Yachts, Pauger Composites (HUN)

Hull
- Hull weight: Carbon Sandwich

Hull appendages
- Keel: Canting Keel
- Rudder: Twin Rudders

Rig
- Rig type: Rotating Mast with Deck Spreaders

Racing
- Class association: IMOCA 60

The IMOCA 60 class yacht L'Occitane en Provence, FRA 2, was designed by Sam Manuard and launched on 31 January 2020 after being assembled by Black Pepper Yachts based in Nantes, France. Pauger Composites in Hungary did the hull moulding.

The boat was the last to be completed for the 2020 Vendée Globe but the hull moulds were then used for Initiative Coeur 4 and OceansLab.

== Design ==
This is the first IMOCA 60 of the designer and the builders and incorporates a lot of thinking of the designer on Mini 6.5 and Class 40 yachts. It is the first SCOW-design hull and had a different approach to the foil configuration than other designs, the main difference being the ability to retract the foils.

IMOCA 60 L’Occitane is the sistership to Oceans Lab and Initiatives-Cœur 4.

== Names and ownership ==
Jack In The Box (name during development)

L'Occitane en Provence (2019-2021)

- Skipper: Armel Tripon
- Sail No.: FRA 2

Bureau Vallée 3 (since 2021)

- Skipper: Louis Burton
- Sail No.: FRA 2

== Racing results ==
Pos	Year	Race	Class	Boat name	Crew	Notes	Ref
Round the world races
dnf / 40	2024	2024–2025 Vendée Globe	IMOCA 60	Bureau Vallée 3	Louis Burton (FRA)	Rigging Damage	
11 / 33	2020	2020–2021 Vendée Globe	IMOCA 60	L'Occitane En Provence	Armel Tripon (FRA)	84d 17h 07m 50s	
Transatlantic Races
DNF	2021	Transat Jacques Vabre	IMOCA 60	Bureau Vallée 3	Louis Burton (FRA); Davy Beaudart (FRA)	Dismasted	
Other Races
	2021	Volvo Ocean Race Europe	IMOCA 60	Bureau Vallée 3	Skipper Louis Burton (FRA); Crewed by Davy Beaudart (FRA); Servane Escoffier (FRA); Thibault Hector (FRA); Christophe Bachmann (FRA); Pip Hare (GBR); Jean-René Guilloux (FRA); Arthur Hubert (FRA); Baptiste Hulin (FRA); Clément Commagnac (FRA)		
