= Sun Odyssey 490 =

Sailboat class

Development
- Designer: Philippe Briand; Jean-Marc Piaton; Jeanneau Design Office
- Location: France
- Year: 2018
- Builder: Jeanneau
- Role: Cruiser
- Name: Sun Odyssey 490

Boat
- Displacement: 24,890 lb (11,290 kg)
- Draft: 7.33 ft (2.23 m)

Hull
- Type: monohull
- Construction: fiberglass
- LOA: 48.50 ft (14.78 m)
- LWL: 43.42 ft (13.23 m)
- Beam: 14.67 ft (4.47 m)
- Engine: Yanmar 57 or 80 hp (43 or 60 kW) diesel engine

Hull appendages
- Keel: fin keel
- Ballast: 6,327 lb (2,870 kg)
- Rudder: dual spade-type rudders

Rig
- Rig type: Bermuda rig
- I foretriangle height: 54.50 ft (16.61 m)
- J foretriangle base: 18.67 ft (5.69 m)
- P mainsail luff: 55.08 ft (16.79 m)
- E mainsail foot: 19.00 ft (5.79 m)

Sails
- Sailplan: fractional rigged sloop masthead sloop
- Mainsail area: 622 sq ft (57.8 m^{2})
- Jib/genoa area: 577 sq ft (53.6 m^{2})
- Other sails: Code 0: 996 sq ft (92.5 m^{2})
- Upwind sail area: 1,199 sq ft (111.4 m^{2})
- Downwind sail area: 1,618 sq ft (150.3 m^{2})

The Sun Odyssey 490 is a French sailboat that was designed by Philippe Briand, Jean-Marc Piaton and the Jeanneau Design Office as an offshore cruiser and first built in 2018.

== Production ==
The design has been built by Jeanneau in France, since 2018 and remained in production in 2023.

== Design ==
The Sun Odyssey 490 is a recreational keelboat, built predominantly of fiberglass, with wood trim. It has a fractional sloop rig, with a bowsprit, a deck-stepped mast, two sets of swept spreaders and aluminum spars with discontinuous 1X19 stainless steel wire rigging. The hull has a plumb stem, a reverse transom with a drop-down tailgate swimming platform, dual internally mounted spade-type rudders controlled by twin wheels and a fixed fin keel or optional shoal-draft keel. The fin keel model displaces 24,890 lb (11,290 kg) empty and carries 6,327 lb (2,870 kg) of cast iron ballast, while the shoal draft version displaces 25,646 lb (11,633 kg) empty and carries 7,038 lb (3,192 kg) of cast iron ballast.

The helm wheels are leather-covered stainless steel, with an option of composite wheels instead. A mast furling mainsail is an option.

A "Performance" version has a taller mast and 9% larger sail area.

The boat has a draft of 7.33 ft (2.23 m) with the standard keel and 5.33 ft (1.62 m) with the optional shoal draft keel.

The boat is fitted with a Japanese Yanmar diesel engine of 57 or 80 hp (43 or 60 kW) for docking and maneuvering. The fuel tank holds 63 U.S. gallons (240 L; 52 imp gal) and the fresh water tank has a capacity of 169 U.S. gallons (640 L; 141 imp gal).

The design has sleeping accommodation for four to eleven people, in two to six cabins for private or yacht charter use. The galley is located on the port side, amidships. The galley is U-shaped and is equipped with a three-burner stove, a refrigerator, freezer and a double sink. A navigation station is aft of the galley, on the starboard side. Two to four heads may be fitted, with two forward and two aft. Cabin headroom is 78 in (198 cm).

For sailing downwind the design may be equipped with a code 0 sail of 996 sq ft (92.5 m^{2}) or optional gennaker.

The design has a hull speed of 8.83 kn (16.35 km/h).

== Operational history ==
The boat is supported by an active class club, the Jeanneau Owners Network.

In a 2018 review for boats.com, Zuzana Prochazka wrote, "standing aft at one of the twin wheels, you can walk all the way to the bow without stepping or climbing over anything, least of all, a cockpit coaming. You can then walk all the way aft down the other side and arrive at the other wheel, again, without obstacles. The deck slopes gently up and onto the main side deck. Drains by the pedestals are there to gather up any water spraying up over the bow and rushing down that slope toward the driver (In particularly snotty conditions, you'll want to drive from the high side just in case that drain doesn't quite get it all)."

In a 2019 Yachting World review, Pip Hare wrote, "personally, I don't find the Sun Odyssey 490 a pretty boat – it is bullish and reminds me of a fist punching through waves – however beauty can be found in function as well as form. This design is about easy living and easy sailing, and it offers a lot for the price. It is a big boat and will deliver fast and fun sailing in the right conditions. It is user friendly, versatile and has a stylish interior that offers no compromise on comfort."

In June 2024, the Sun Odyssey 490, along with the 440 and 410, was recalled due to faulty bow thrusters resulting in some cases of sinking.

== See also ==
- List of sailing boat types
