= Louis Burton =

French yachtsman

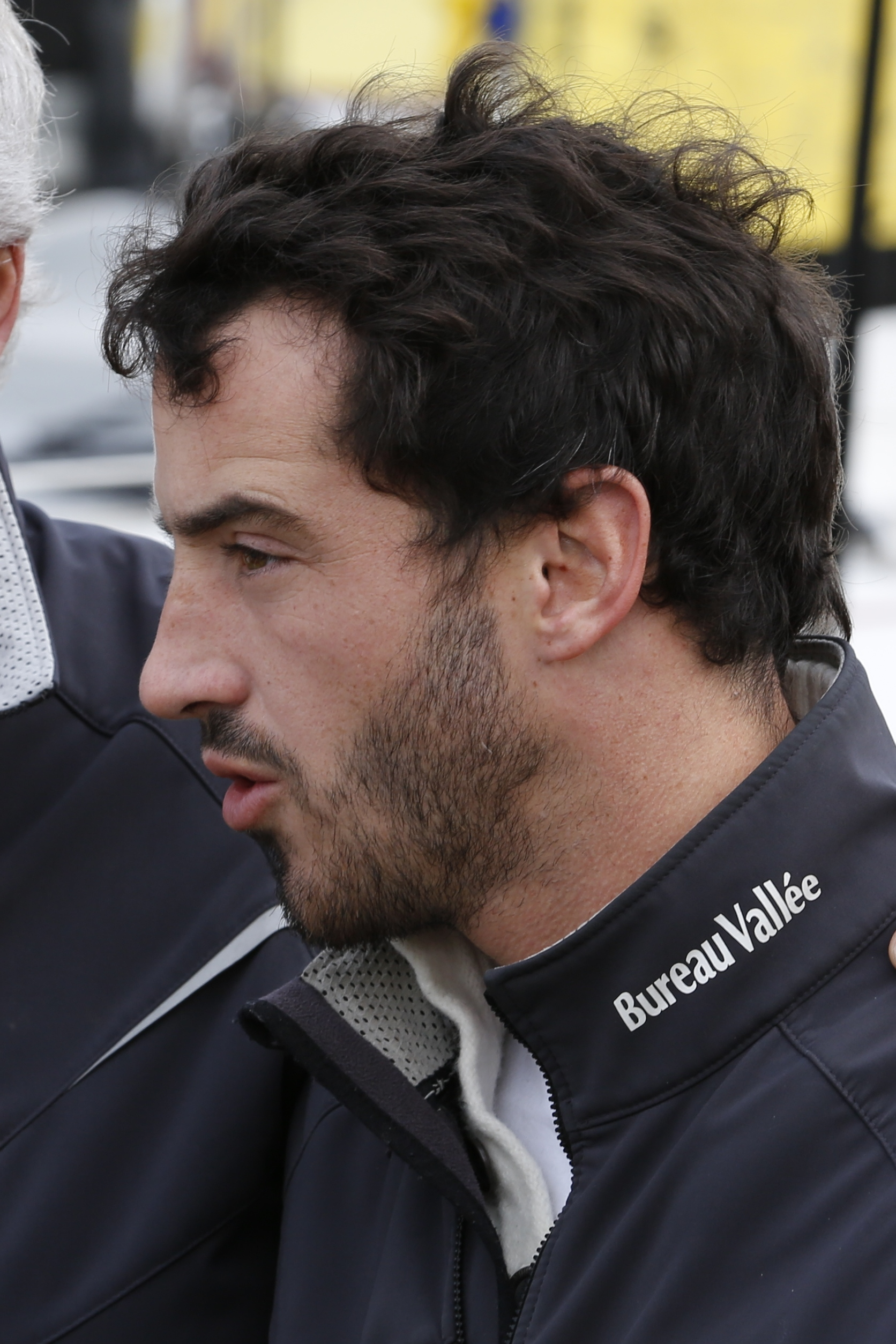
- start of the 2013 Transat Vabre

Personal information
- Nationality: French
- Born: 4 June 1985 (age 40) Ivry-sur-Seine

Sport

Sailing career
- Class: IMOCA 60 / Classe Mini

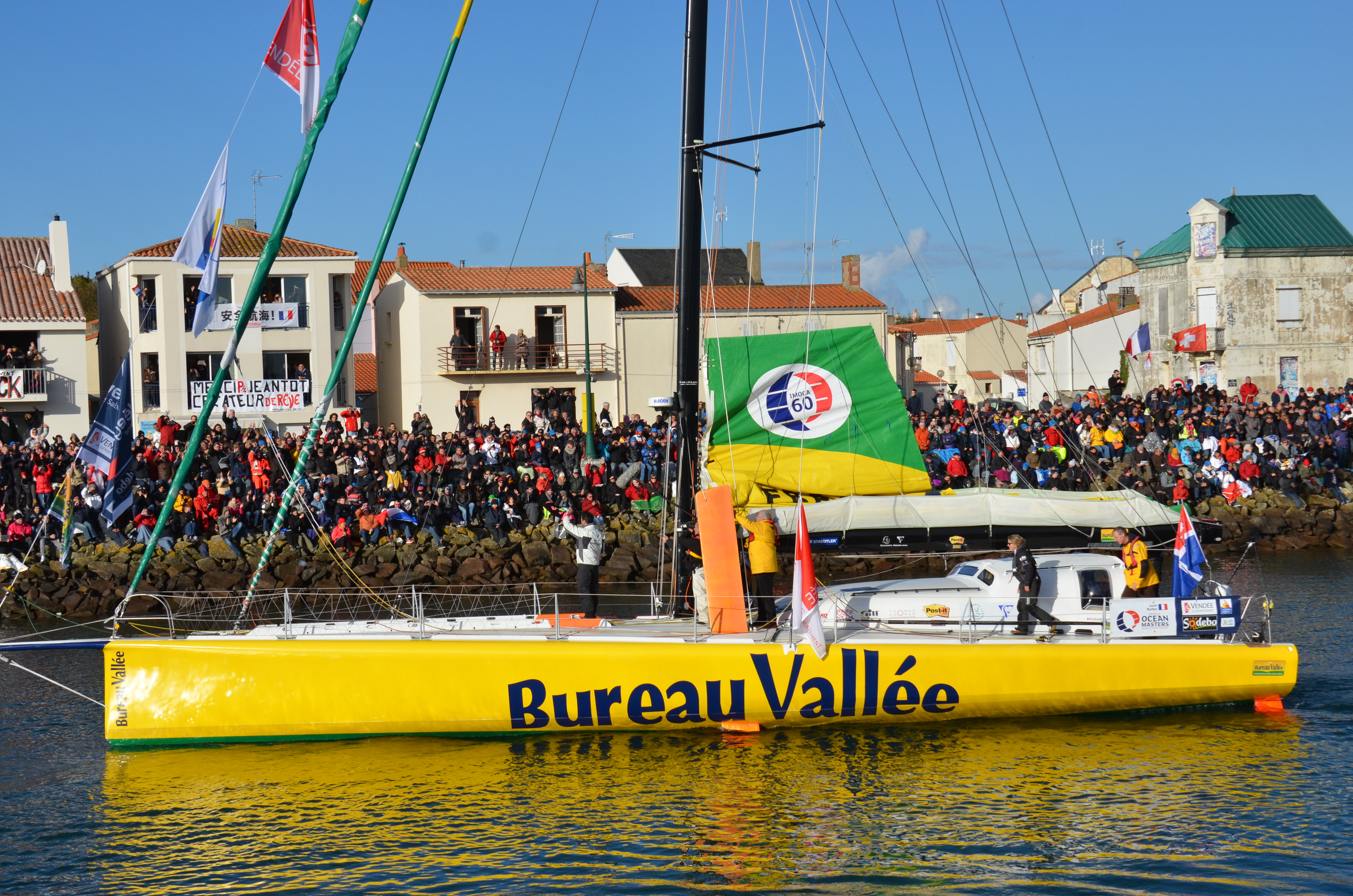
Thumbnailed image

Louis Burton (born 4 June 1985 in Ivry-sur-Seine, France) is a French yachtsman who competes in ocean racing. Burton was the youngest skipper of the fleet at the start of the Vendée Globe 2012.

== Race result highlights ==
Pos.	ear	Event	Class	Boat name	Notes	Ref.
Round the World Races
DNF	2025	Vendée Globe	IMOCA 60	Bureau Vallée (3)	Retired unaided to Cape Town (Rigging damage)	
3	2021	Vendée Globe	IMOCA 60	Bureau Vallée (2)	80d 10h 25m 12s	
7	2016	Vendée Globe	IMOCA 60	Bureau Vallée (1)	87 d 21 h 45 min 49 s	
RET	2012	Vendée Globe	IMOCA 60	Bureau Vallée (1)	Day 3: collision with a fishing boat	
Transatlantic Races
TBC	2023	Retour à la base	IMOCA 60	Bureau Vallee 3		
16	2023	Transat Jacques Vabre	IMOCA 60	Bureau Vallee 3	with Davy Beaudart (FRA)	
DNF	2022	Route du Rhum	IMOCA 60	Bureau Vallee 3	Dismasted	
DNF	2021	Transat Jacques Vabre	IMOCA 60	Bureau Vallee 3	Dismasted with Davy Beaudart (FRA)	
10	2019	Transat Jacques Vabre	IMOCA 60	Bureau Vallée 2	with Davy Beaudart (FRA)	
7	2017	Transat Jacques Vabre	IMOCA 60	Bureau Vallée 2	with Servane Escoffier (FRA)	
9	2015	Transat Jacques Vabre	IMOCA 60	Bureau Vallée	with Romain Attanasio (FRA)	
5	2013	Transat Jacques Vabre	IMOCA 60	Bureau Vallée	with Guillaume Le Brec (FRA)	
7	2011	Transat Jacques Vabre	IMOCA 60	Bureau Vallée	with Nelson Burton (FRA)	
RET	2018	Route du Rhum	IMOCA 60	Bureau Vallée 2		
5	2014	Route du Rhum	IMOCA 60	Bureau Vallée		
7	2011	Transat B to B				
20	2010	Route du Rhum				
Other Races
5/5	2021	Ocean Race Europe	IMOCA 60	Bureau Vallée 3	crewed by Davy Beaudart (FRA); Servane Escoffier (FRA); Thibault Hector (FRA); Christophe Bachmann (FRA); Pip Hare (GBR); Jean-René Guilloux (FRA); Arthur Hubert (FRA); Baptiste Hulin (FRA); Clément Commagnac (FRA)	
10	2019	Défi Azimut				
3	2019	Rolex Fastnet Race				
8	2018	Monaco Globe series				
RET	2018	Bermuda 1000 Race				
6	2017	Rolex Fastnet Race	IMOCA 60	Bureau Vallée 2	with Servane Escoffier (FRA)	
