= IMOCA 60 Cheminees Poujoulat =

Sailboat

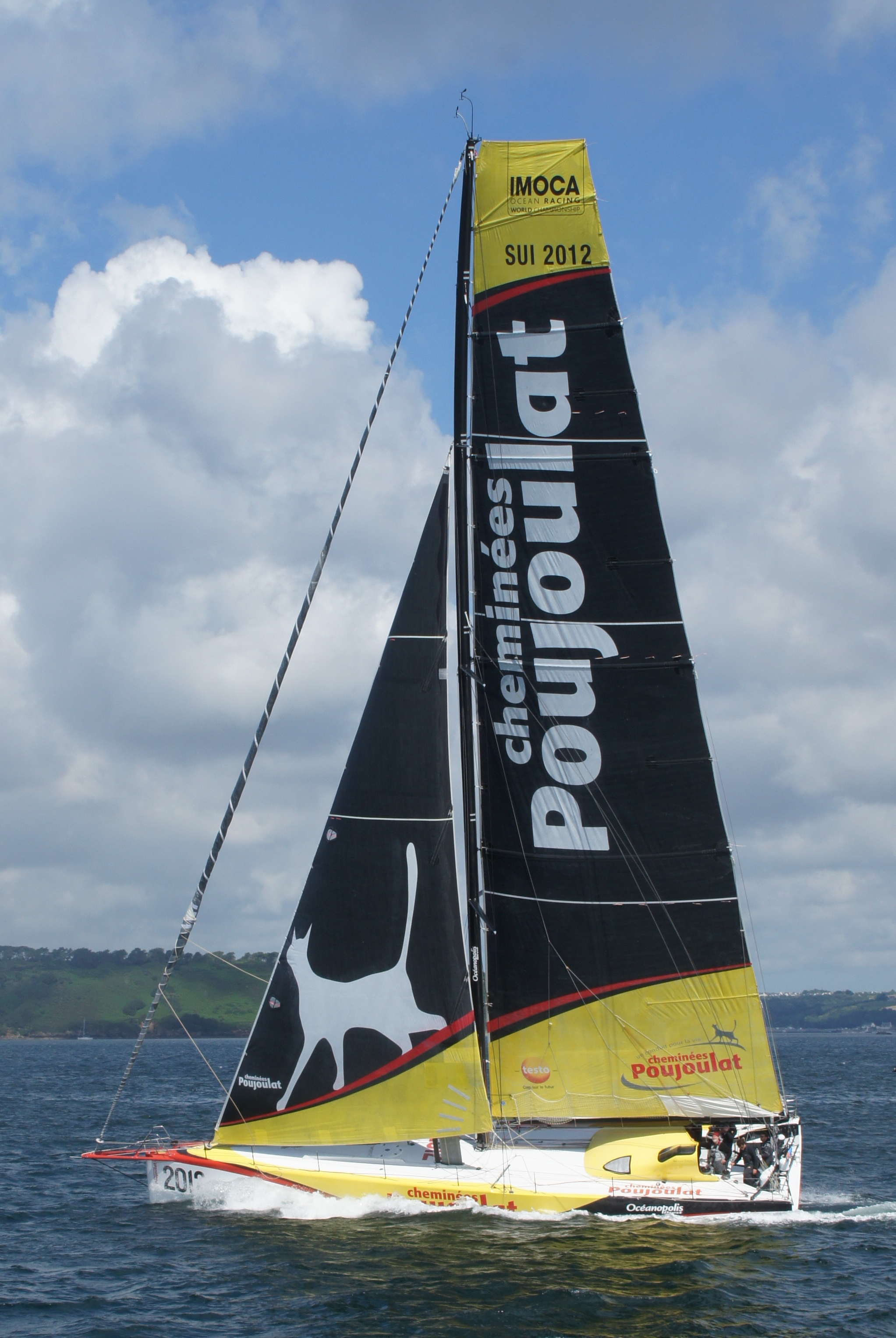

Development
- Designer: Juan Kouyoumdjian
- Builder: Decision Groupe Carboman (SUI)

Racing
- Class association: IMOCA 60

The IMOCA 60 class yacht Cheminées Poujoulat (5) was designed by Juan Kouyoumdjian built by Decision SA in Lausanne, Switzerland and launched in the year 2011. The boat was written off on 24 December 2013 after breaking apart on the return journey from the Transat Jacque Vabre.

== Loss of boat and rescue ==
Bernard Stamm and crewmember Damien Guillou were rescued at 0600 on the 24 Dec 2013 after the boat broke up and they activate there EPIRB. The boat was 170 miles off the Scilly Isles when the event happened at 18:50 on the 23 December 2013. The rescue operation involved two helicopters and a fixed wing aircraft from the UK and France. The boat was in storm force 9 conditions with 10 meter waves that prevailed in the Western Approaches. The crew of Bernard Stamm and Damien Guillou were rescued by a Norwegian cargo vessel the Star Isfjord at 06:14 on the 24th in an exercise that took over two hours. The cause of the incident is thought to be corrosion of the core in the hull laminate.

== Racing results ==
Pos	Year	Race	Class	Boat name	Skipper	Notes	Ref
Round the world races
DNF	2012	2012–2013 Vendée Globe	IMOCA 60	Cheminées Poujoulat (5)	Bernard Stamm (SUI)		
Transatlantic Races
DNF	2011	Transat Jacques Vabre	IMOCA 60	Cheminées Poujoulat (5)	Bernard Stamm (SUI); François Cuzon (FRA)		
4 / 10	2011	Transat Jacques Vabre	IMOCA 60	Cheminées Poujoulat (5)	Bernard Stamm (SUI); Philippe Legros	17d 12h 19m	
Other Races
DNS	2013	Défi Azimut	IMOCA 60	Cheminées Poujoulat (5)	Bernard Stamm (SUI)		
3 / 7	2013	Trophée Azimut	IMOCA 60	Cheminées Poujoulat (5)	Bernard Stamm (SUI)		
4 / 7	2013	Fastnet	IMOCA 60	Cheminées Poujoulat (5)	Bernard Stamm (SUI)	2d 19h 33m	
6 / 6	2014	Artemis Challenge (Cowes Week	IMOCA 60	Cheminées Poujoulat (5)	Bernard Stamm (SUI)		
4 / 7	2012	Europa Warm-Up; Barcelone-Cascais-La Rochelle	IMOCA 60	Cheminées Poujoulat (5)	Bernard Stamm (SUI)		
3 / 6	2012		IMOCA 60	Cheminées Poujoulat (5)	Bernard Stamm (SUI)		
2 / 4	2011		IMOCA 60	Cheminées Poujoulat (5)	Bernard Stamm (SUI)		
