= IMOCA 60 Paprec =

Sailboat

Development
- Designer: Farr Yacht Design
- Year: April 2003
- Builder: Cookson Boats (NZL) Ltd

Racing
- Class association: IMOCA 60

The IMOCA 60 class yacht Virbac, also referred to as Virbac-Paprec, after the names of the companies Virbac and Paprec, was designed by Farr Yacht Design and launched in 2003 after being built by Cookson Boats in their New Zealand yard. The boat was lost during the 2008-2009 Vendée Globe when it stopped at Kerguelen Islands but washed ashore by a gust of wind. It was eventually recovered and put on the "Marion Dufresne" and brought back to Reunion Island before being written of and destroyed.

== Racing results ==
Pos	Year	Race	Class	Boat name	Skipper	Notes	Ref
Round the world races
DNF	2008	2008–2009 Vendée Globe	IMOCA 60	Cheminées Poujalat (3), SUI 7	Bernard Stamm (SUI)		
6 / 20	2005	2004–2005 Vendée Globe	IMOCA 60	Paprec-Virbac	Jean-Pierre Dick (FRA)	98d 04h	
Transatlantic Races
Other Races
