= Bernard Stamm =

Swiss sailor, skipper and navigator

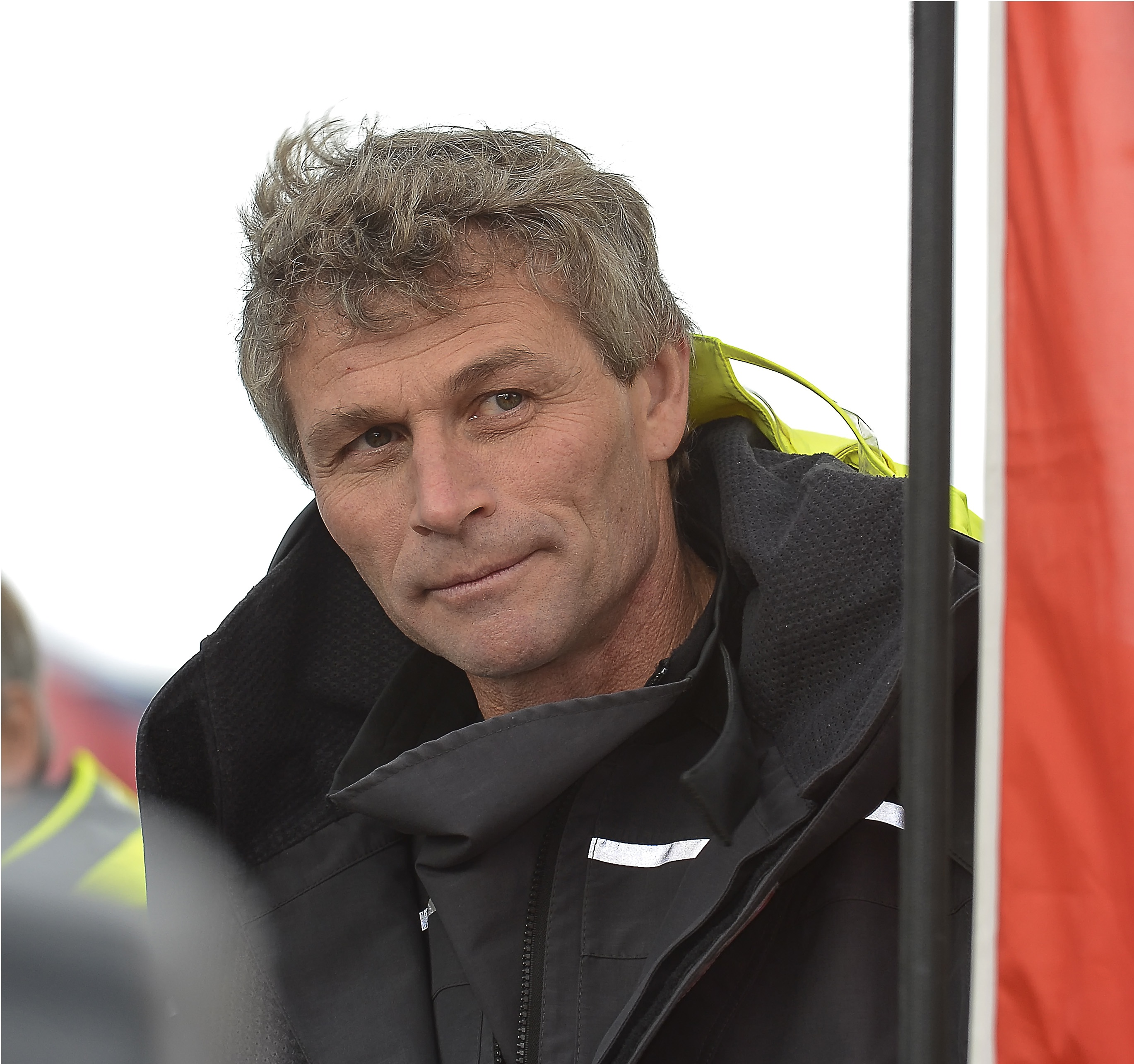
- At the start of Vendée Globe 2012

Personal information
- Nationality: Swiss
- Born: 29 November 1963 (age 62) Geneva

Sport

Sailing career
- Class: IMOCA 60

Bernard Stamm, is a Swiss professional yachtsman, born on 29 November 1963 in Geneva, Switzerland.

He is an offshore sailor who has started the Vendée Globe three times but never officially completed the course. He did not have any luck starting in the 2000-2001 edition of the race where he retired after a week of racing because of auto pilot failure. In 2004-2005, he lost his keel in the Transat race five months before the start so didn't make the start. In the 2008-2009 he collided with a cargo vessel on the first night and had to return to repair his bowsprit and mast. Setting out again three and a half days after his rivals, he got halfway round before discovering a problem with his rudder bearings and attempted to find safe harbor in the Kerguelens but bad weather made it impossible to moor despite outside help, and the boat had to be abandoned. In 2012-2013 edition he did complete the course but was disqualified from the race before the finish.

He was rescued in 2013 after his boat was hit by a large wave in severe weather on the way back from the Transat Jacques Vabre.

== Gallery ==
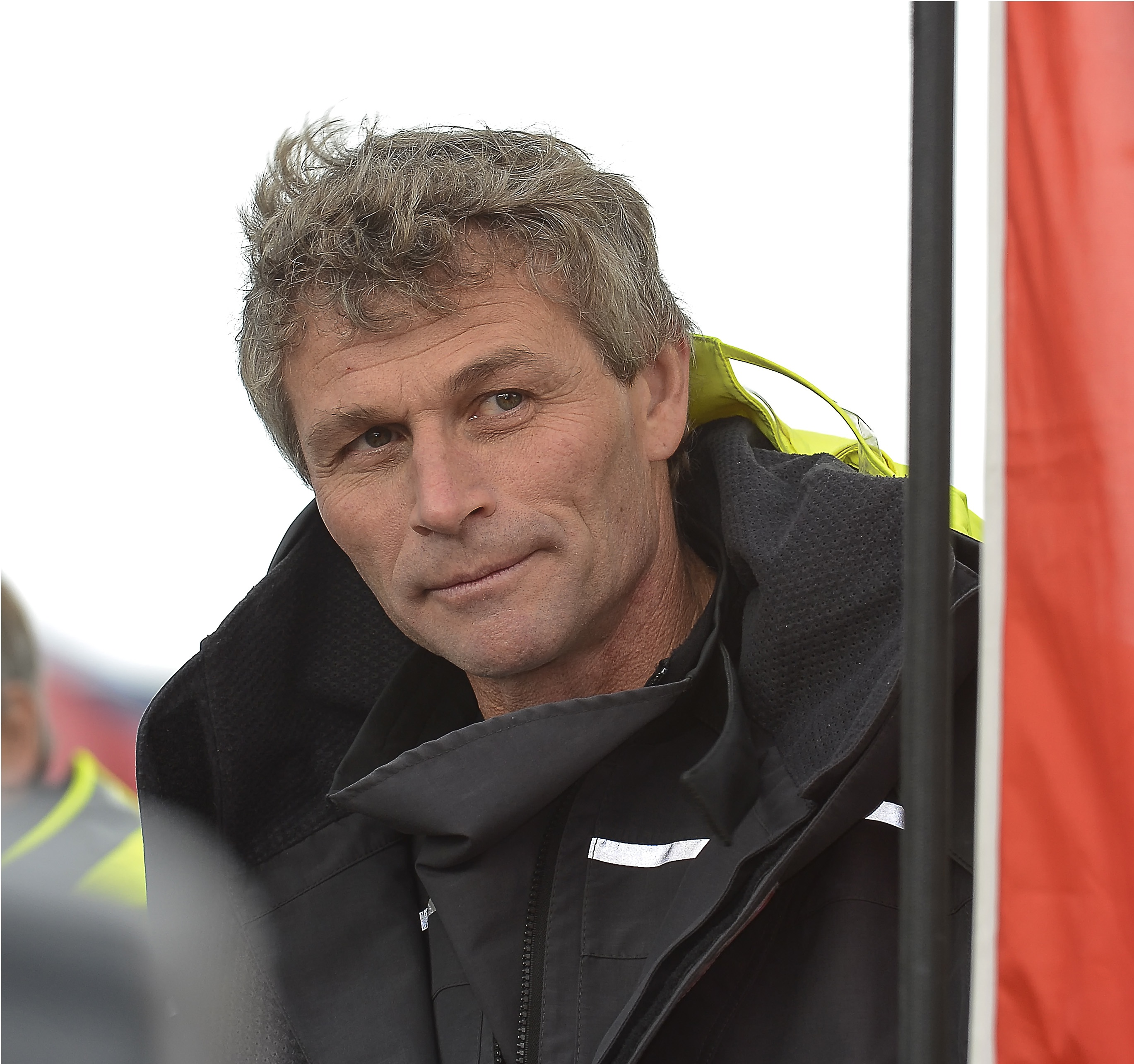

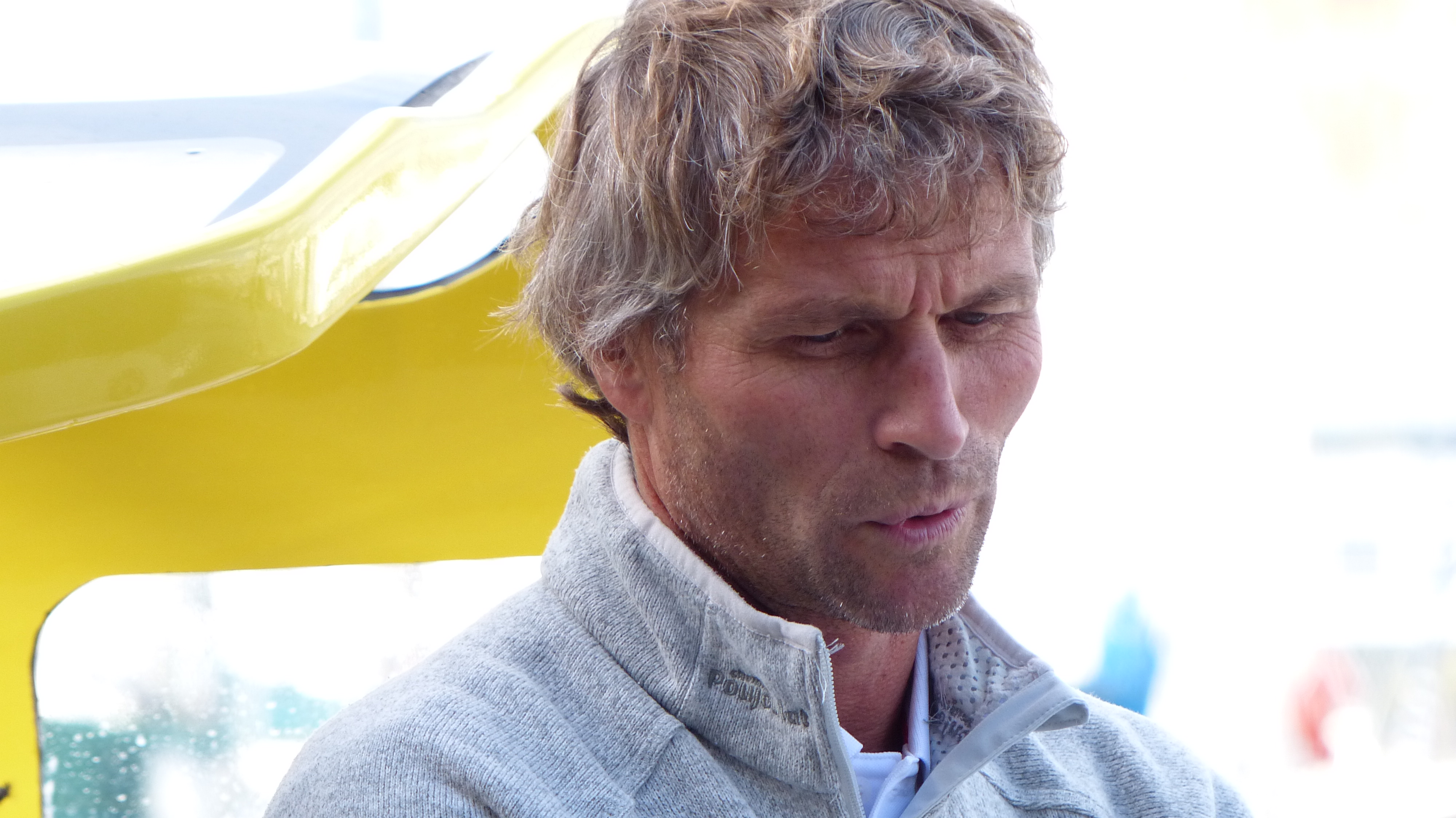

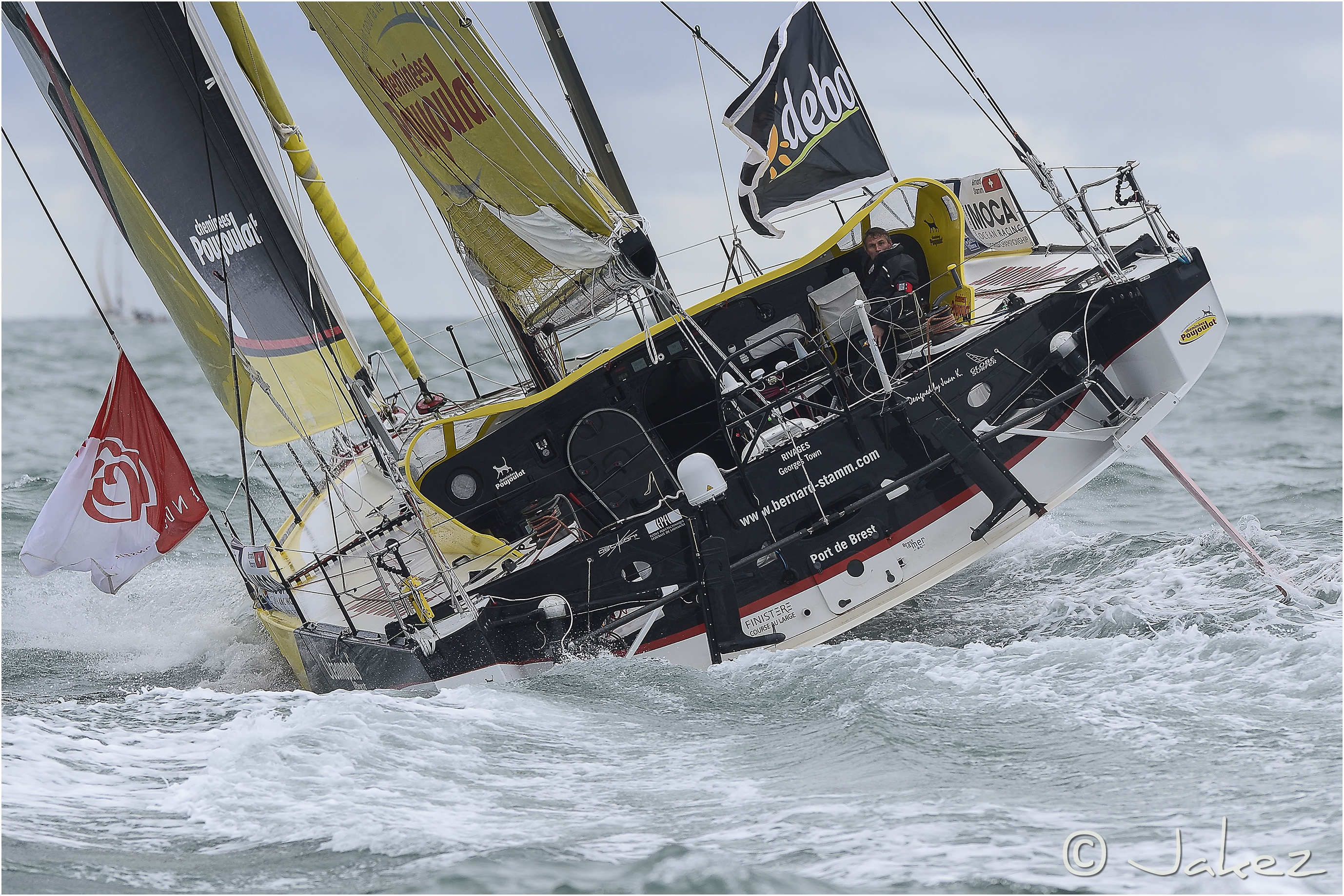

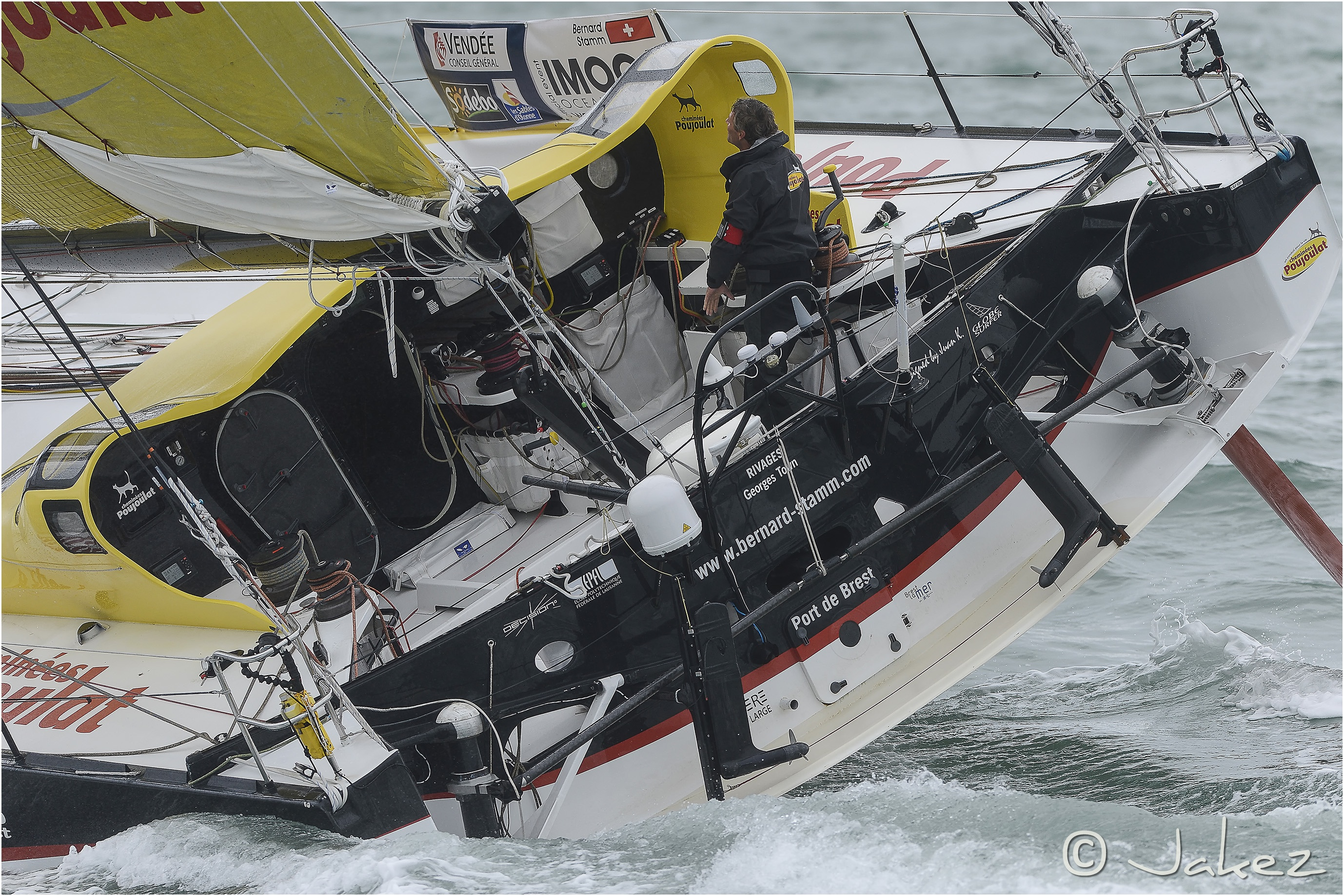

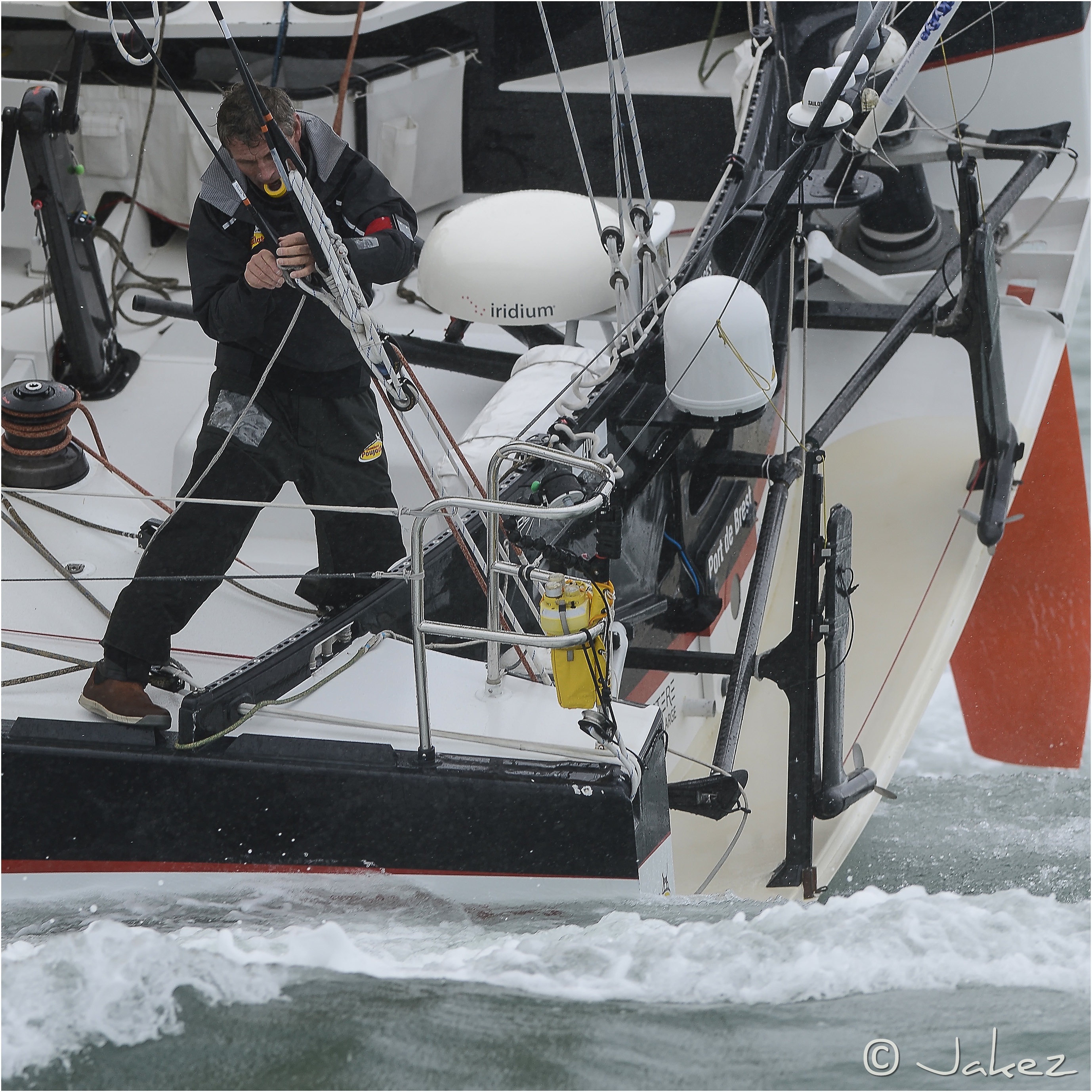

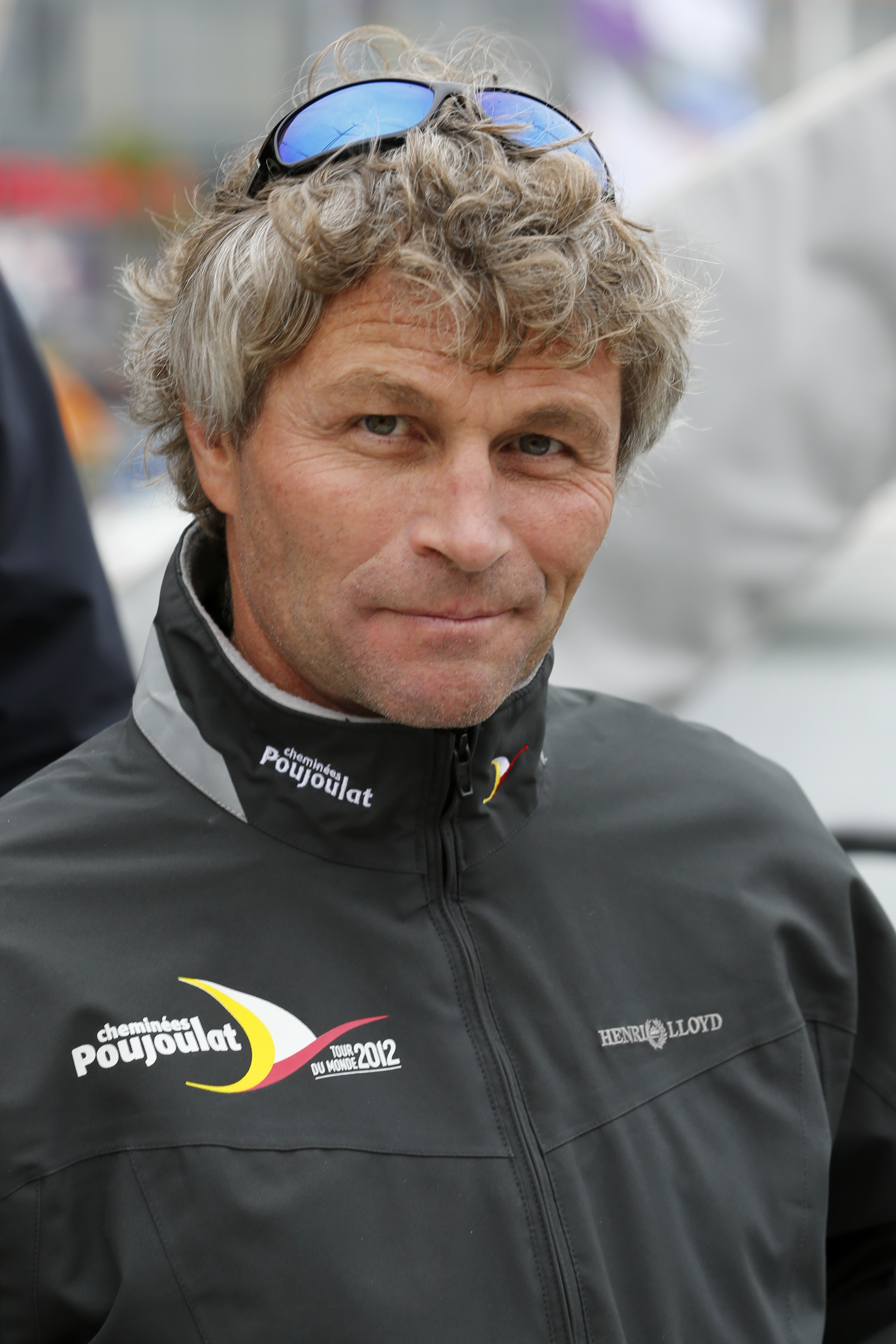

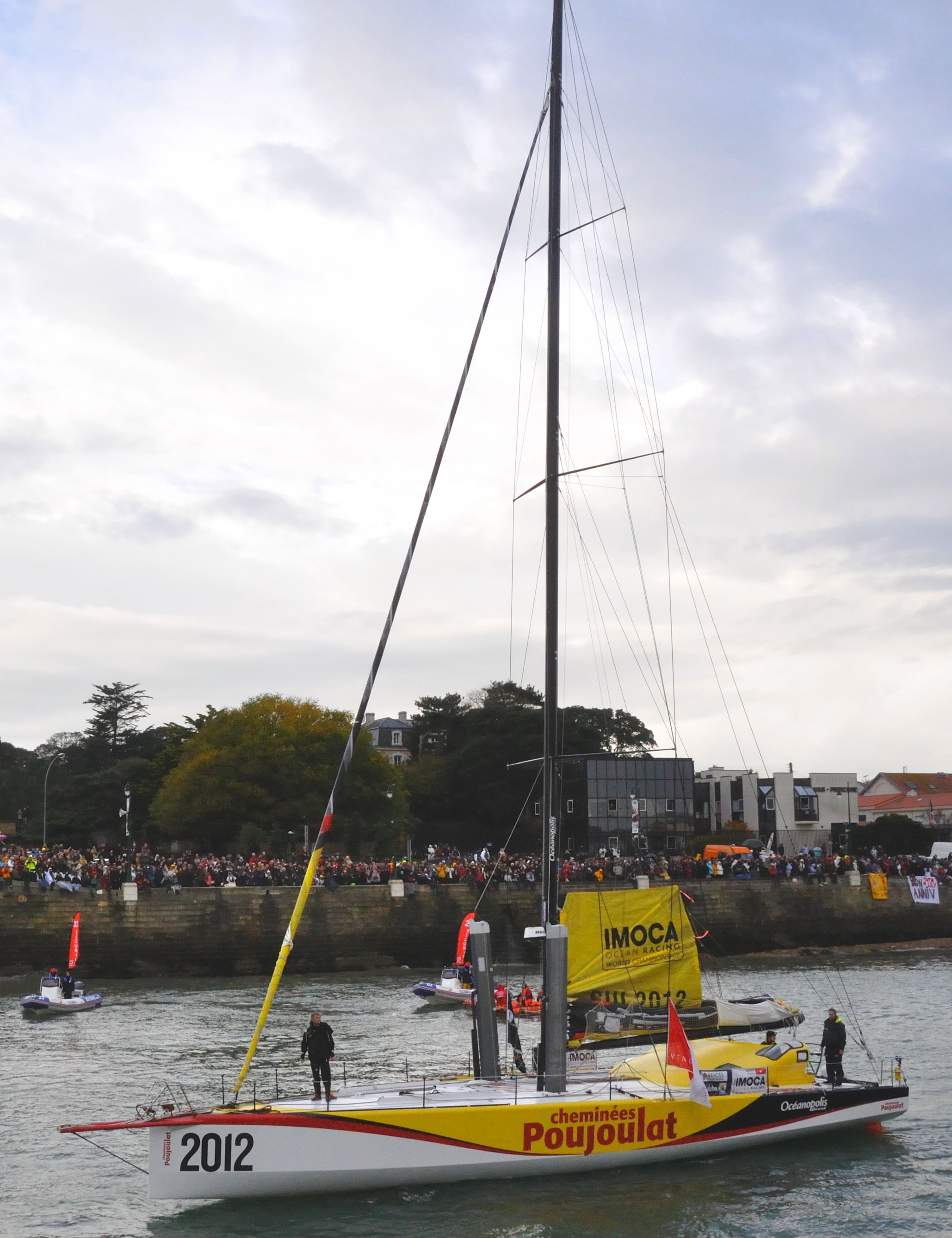

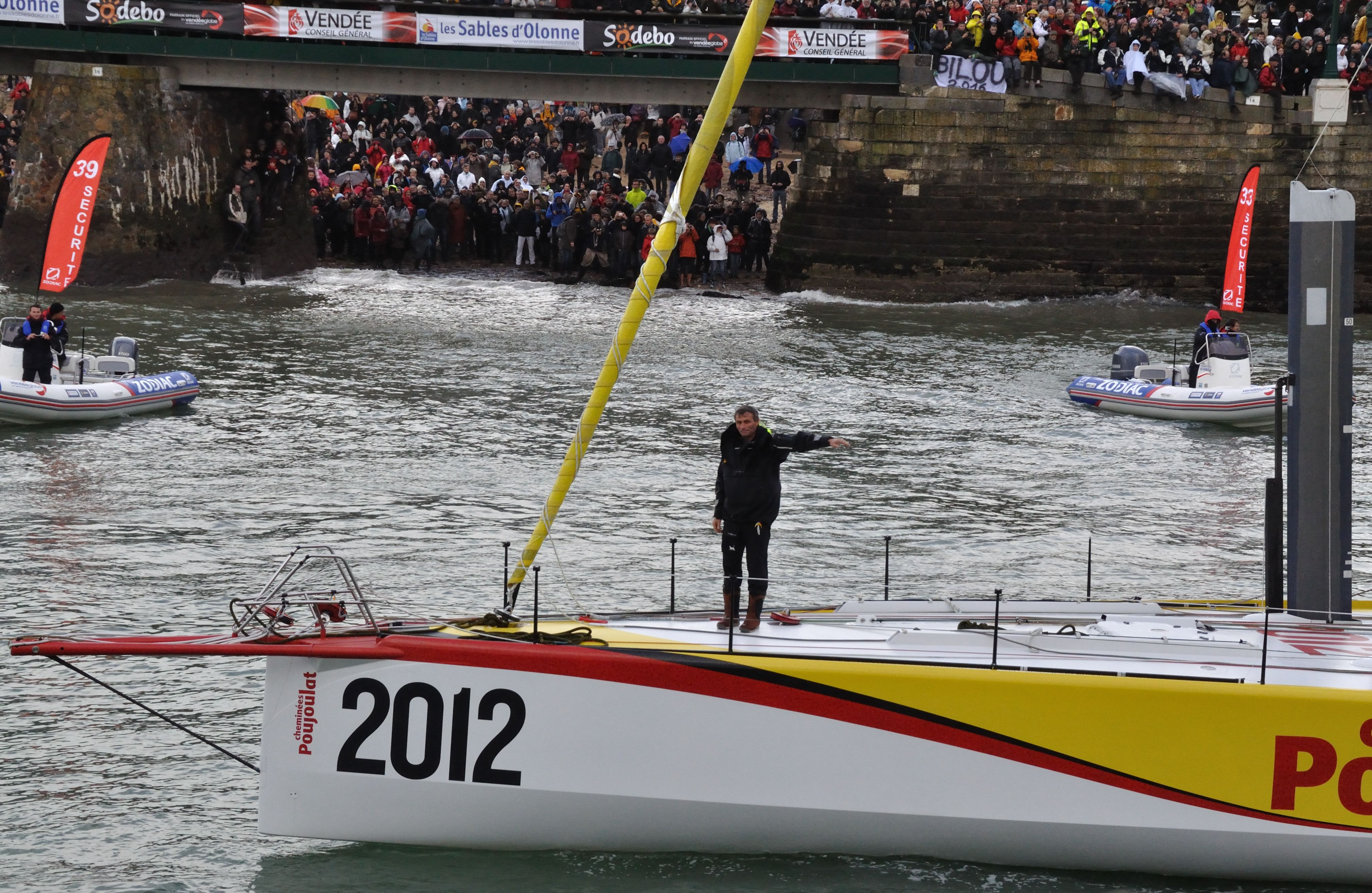

== Race result highlights ==
Pos	Year	Race	Class	Boat	Notes	Ref
Round the World Races
WR	2017	Round the World Record; Jules Verne Trophy	Maxi Trimaran	IDEC Sport	skipper by Francis Joyon in 40 days 23 hours 30 minutes 30 seconds	
1st	2015	2014–2015 Barcelona World Race	IMOCA 60	Cheminées Poujoulat (5)	with Jean Le Cam	
DSQ	2013	2012–2013 Vendée Globe	IMOCA 60	Cheminées Poujoulat (4)		
RET	2008	2008–2009 Vendée Globe	IMOCA 60	Cheminées Poujoulat (3)	Boat written off	
1st	2007	Velux 5 Oceans Race	IMOCA 60	Cheminées Poujoulat (3)		
World; Record	2005	Around the World Record and the Jules Verne Trophy	N/A	Maxi Cat - Orange II	skipper by Bruno Peyron in 50 days 16 hours 20 minutes 4 seconds	
1st	2002	Around Alone Race	IMOCA 60	Bobst Group - Armor Lux		
RET	2001	2000–2001 Vendée Globe	IMOCA 60	Super Bigou		
Trans Oceanic Races
4th	2013	Transat Jacques Vabre	IMOCA 60	Cheminées Poujoulat	with Philippe Legros	
3rd	2007	Transat Jacques Vabre	IMOCA 60	Cheminées Poujoulat	with Tanguy Cariou	
WR	2006	World Record North Atlantic Crossing (4 day 8:23:54)	Maxi Cat	Orange II	skipper by Bruno Peyron	
6th	2007	Transat B to B		Cheminées Poujoulat	15d 16h 24min 34s	
8th	2001	Transat Jacques Vabre			with Vincent Riou	
3rd	1995	Mini Transat Race	Mini Transat 6.50			
Other Races
9th	2007	Calais Round Britain Race	IMOCA 60			
1	1996	Mini Fastnet	Mini Transat 6.50			

== IMOCA 60 Owned ==
Name	Sail No.	Years Owned	Year Launched	Launched Name	Builder	Designer	Key Races	Ref
Cheminées Poujoulat (5)	SUI 1	2014 - 2015	2007	Foncia	CDK	Farr	2014–2015 Barcelona World Race	
Cheminées Poujoulat (4)	SUI 2012	2011-2013	New Build		Decision (SUI)	Kouyoumdjian	2012–2013 Vendée Globe	
Cheminées Poujoulat (3)	SUI 7	2007 - 2009	2003	Virbac	Cookson (NZL)	Farr	2008–2009 Vendée Globe ]Velux 5 Oceans Race	
Cheminees Poujoulat - Armor Lux - Pindar		2004	2001	Hexagon	Southern Ocean Marine	Owen Clark	never raced although planned the 2004 Vendee	
Cheminées Poujoulat - Armor Lux / Bobst Group - Armor Lux / Super Bigou		2000 - 2009	New Build		Stamm	Rolland	2002 Around Alone Race; 2000–2001 Vendée Globe	
