= IMOCA 60 Super Bigou =

Sailboat

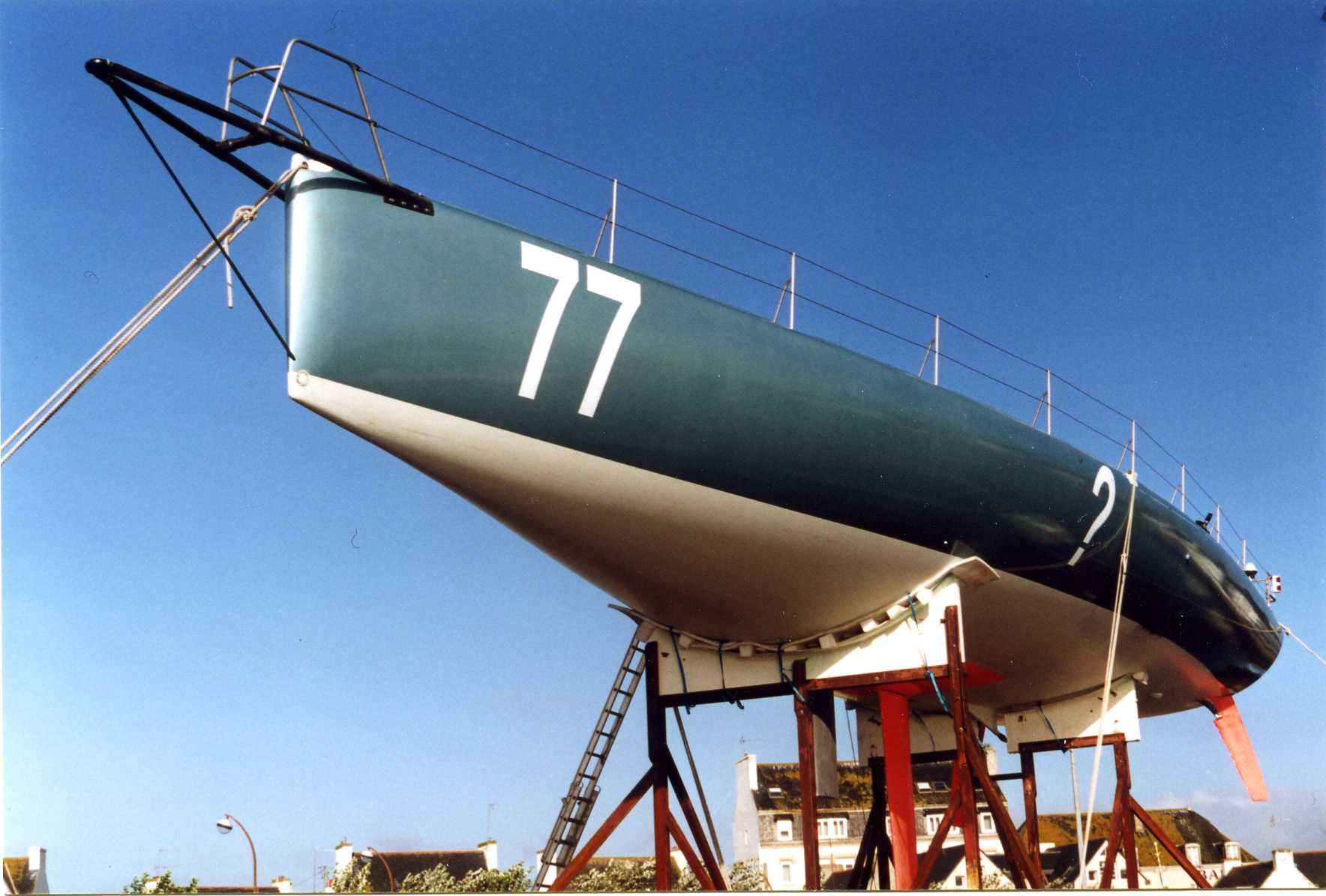

Development
- Designer: Pierre Rolland
- Year: July 2000
- Builder: Bernard Stamm

Boat
- Draft: 4.5 m (15 ft)

Hull
- Hull weight: Carbon Airex Sandwich
- Beam: 5.7 m (19 ft)

Hull appendages
- Keel: Canting Keel
- Ballast: 3,100 kg (6,800 lb); 2500 lt Ballast
- Rudder: Twin Rudders

Rig
- Rig type: 3 spreader Sloop Rig

Sails
- Upwind sail area: 290 m^{2} (3,100 sq ft)
- Downwind sail area: 550 m^{2} (5,900 sq ft)

Racing
- Class association: IMOCA 60

The IMOCA 60 class yacht Super Bigou designed by Pierre Rolland and launched in the year 2000. What makes the boat rare is that it was constructed by Bernard Stamm the boats original skipper and owner rather than an established yard.

== Racing results ==
Pos	Year	Race	Class	Boat name	Skipper	Notes	Ref
Round the world races
19 / 33	2020	2020–2021 Vendée Globe	IMOCA 60	Medallia, GBR 77	Pip Hare (GBR)	95d 11h 37m 30s	
12 / 29	2016	2016–2017 Vendée Globe	IMOCA 60	La Fabrique	Alan Roura (FRA)	105d 20h 10m 32s	
1	2007	Velux 5 Oceans Race	IMOCA 60	Cheminées POUJOULAT, SUI 7	Bernard Stamm (FRA)		
1	2003	Around Alone	IMOCA 60	BOBST Group - ARMOR LUX	Bernard Stamm (FRA)		
DNF	2000	2000–2001 Vendée Globe	IMOCA 60	SUPER BIGOU - ARMOR LUX 77	Bernard Stamm (FRA)		
Transatlantic Races
24 / 29	2019	Transat Jacques Vabre	IMOCA 60	Pip Hare Ocean Racing, GBR 77	Pip Hare (GBR); Ysbrannt Endt (NED)		
Other Races

== Gallery ==
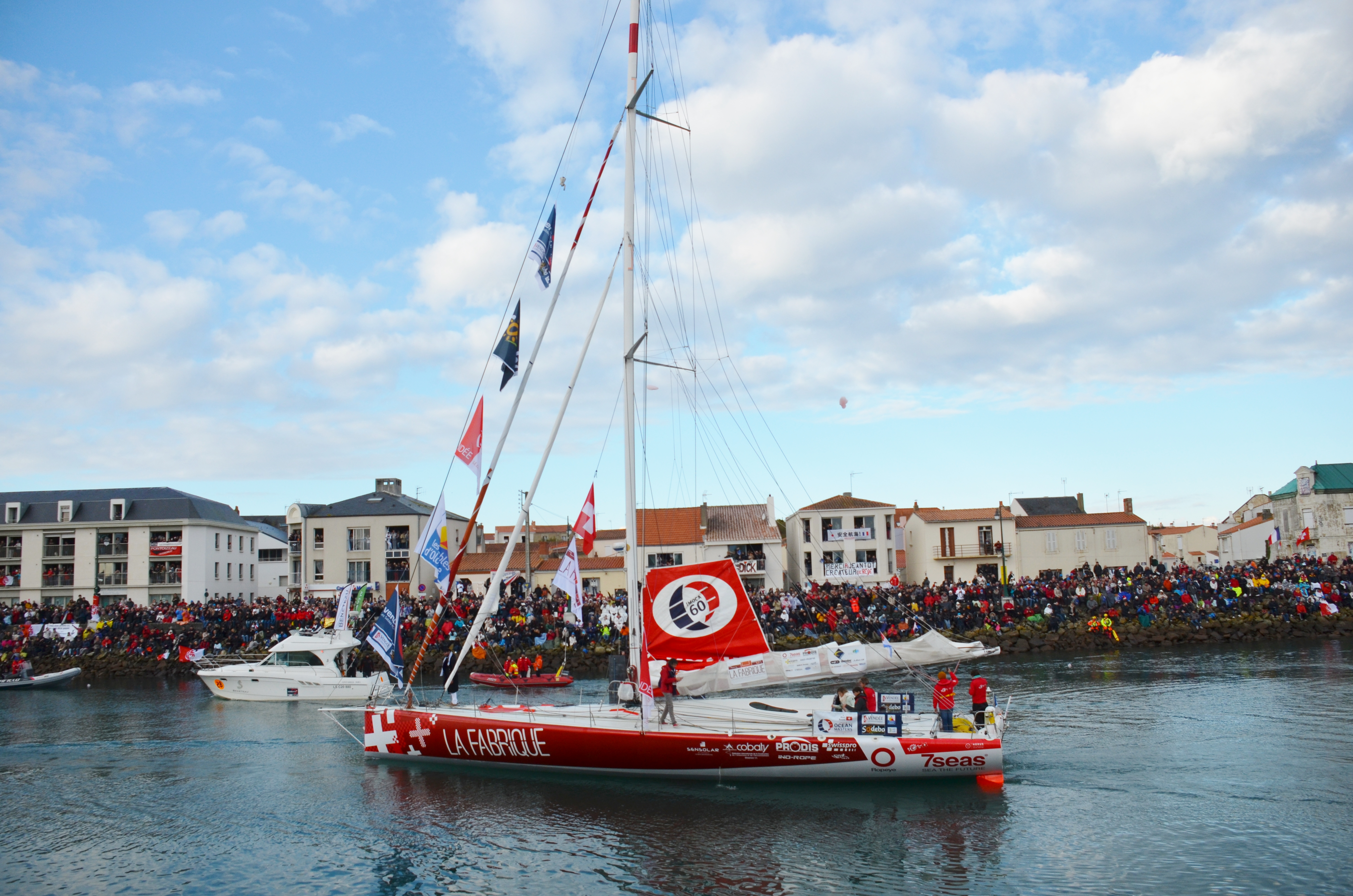

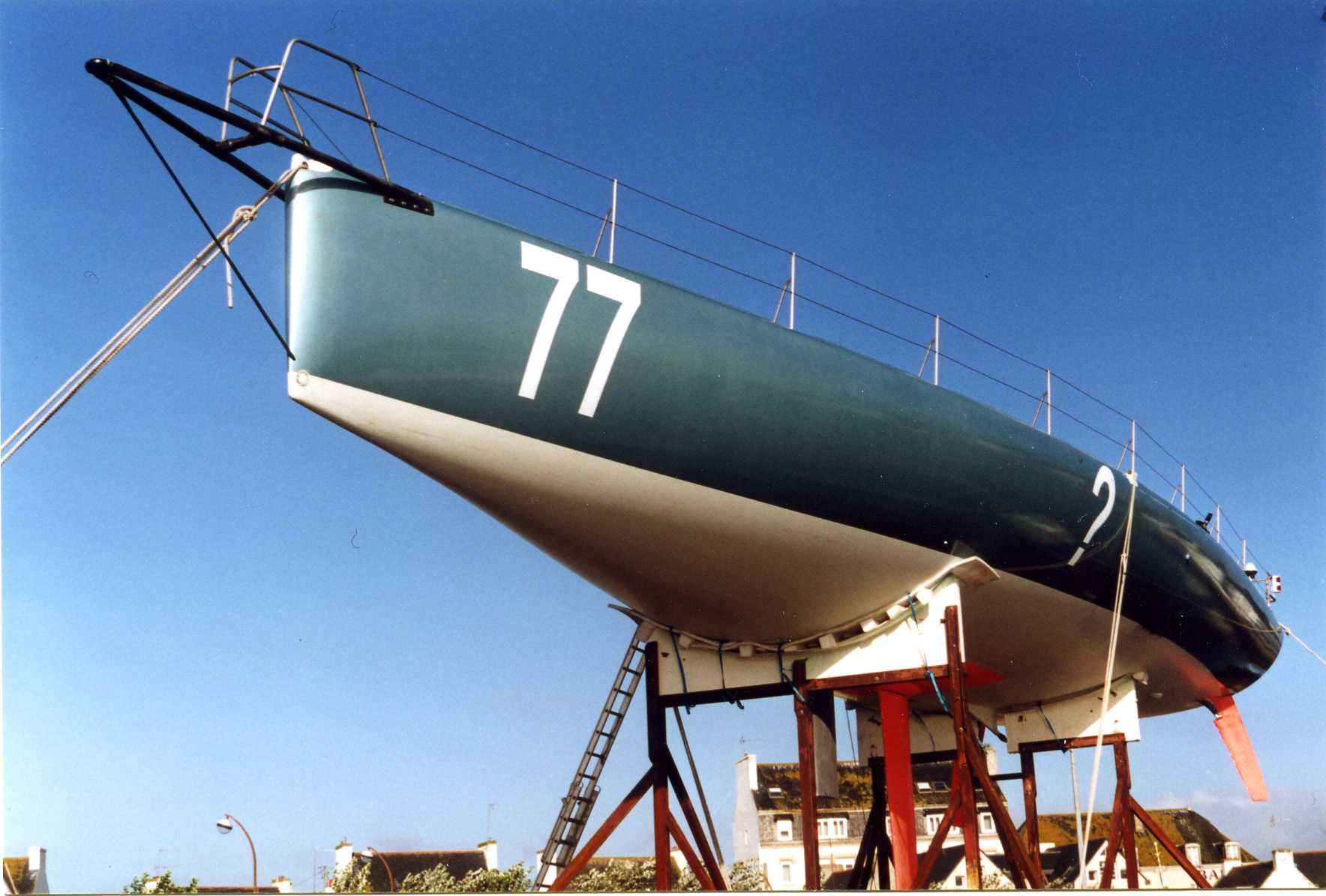

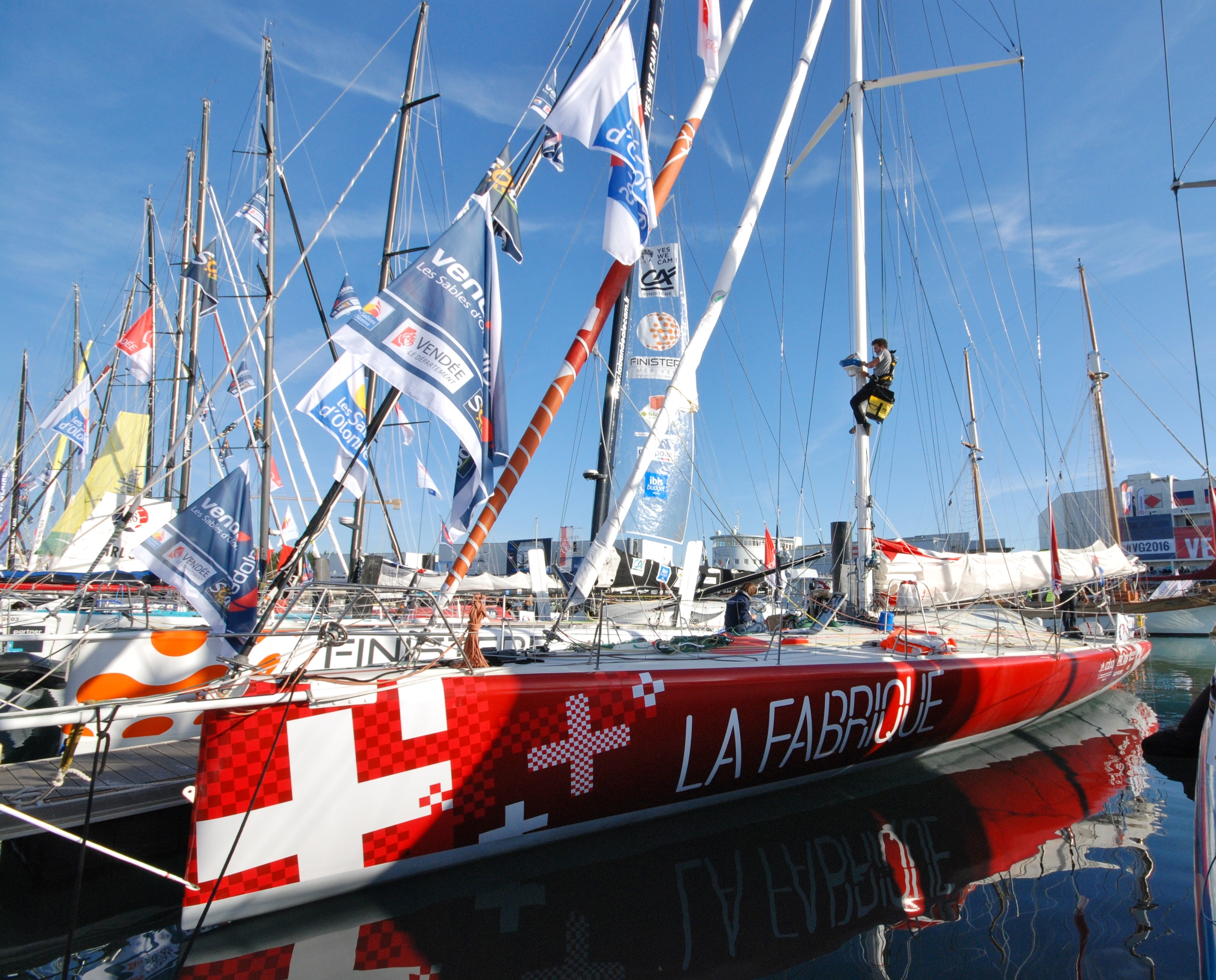

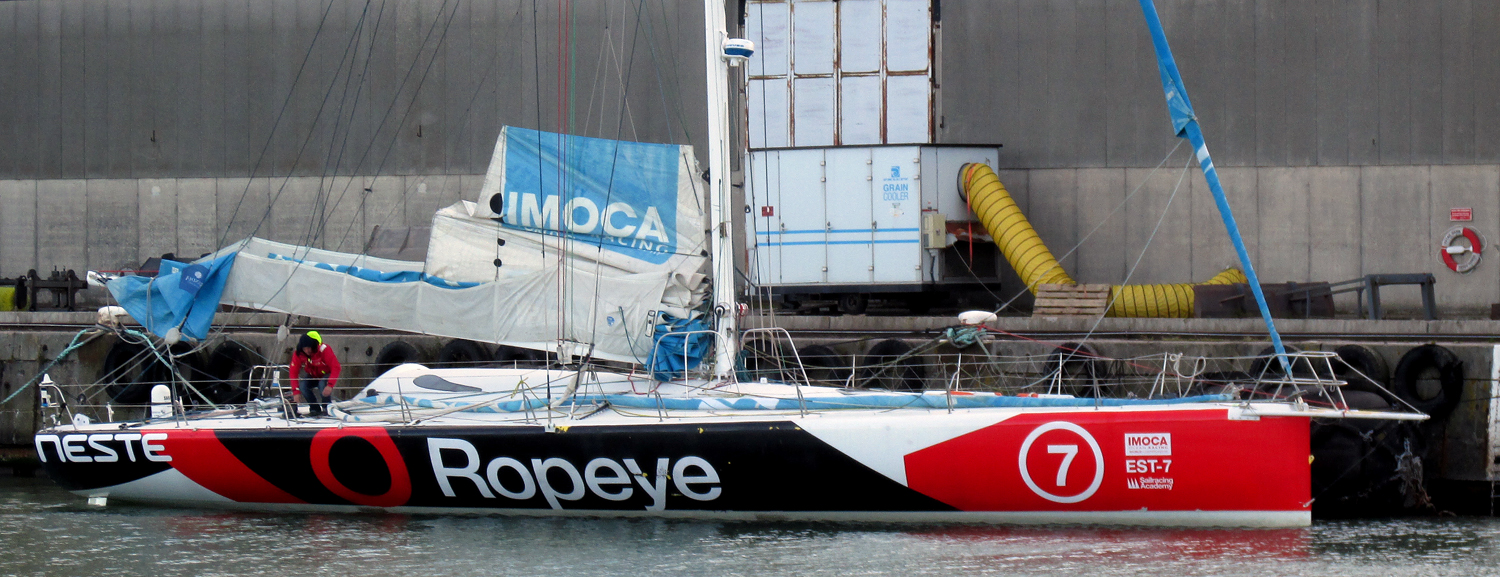

== Name and ownership ==
=== Pip Hare Ocean Racing ===
In 2018 the boat was chartered by Pip Hare to compete in 2020-2021 Vendée Globe.

==== Medallia ====
In 2020 Hare secured title sponsorship for her 2020-2021 Vendée Globe, renaming the boat Medallia for her sponsor.
