= Swan 43 Holland =

Sailboat class

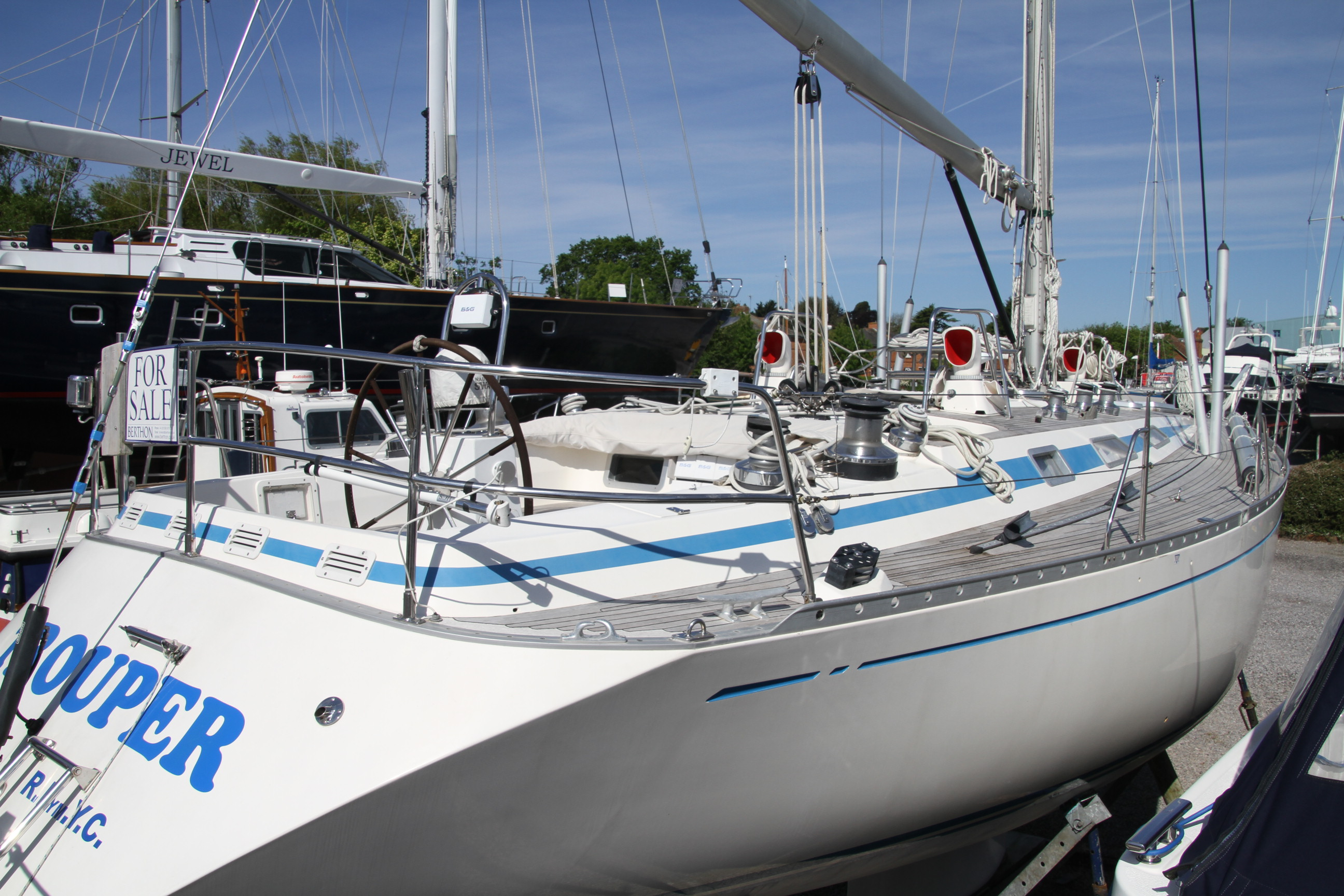

Development
- Designer: Ron Holland
- Location: Finland
- Year: 1985
- No. built: 28
- Builder: Oy Nautor AB
- Role: Cruiser
- Name: Swan 43 Holland

Boat
- Displacement: 24,432 lb (11,082 kg)
- Draft: 6.20 ft (1.89 m)

Hull
- Type: monohull
- Construction: glassfibre
- LOA: 42.83 ft (13.05 m)
- LWL: 34.12 ft (10.40 m)
- Beam: 13.12 ft (4.00 m)
- Engine: Volvo Penta 45 hp (34 kW) diesel engine

Hull appendages
- Keel: fin keel
- Ballast: 9,040 lb (4,100 kg)
- Rudder: spade-type rudder

Rig
- Rig type: Bermuda rig
- I foretriangle height: 56.93 ft (17.35 m)
- J foretriangle base: 17.48 ft (5.33 m)
- P mainsail luff: 50.00 ft (15.24 m)
- E mainsail foot: 15.26 ft (4.65 m)

Sails
- Sailplan: Masthead sloop
- Mainsail area: 381.50 sq ft (35.443 m^{2})
- Jib/genoa area: 497.57 sq ft (46.226 m^{2})
- Total sail area: 879.07 sq ft (81.668 m^{2})

The Swan 43 Holland or Swan 432, is a Finnish sailboat that was designed by Ron Holland as a blue water cruiser and first built in 1985.

The design was originally marketed by the manufacturer as the Swan 43, but is now usually referred to as the Swan 43 Holland or the Swan 432, to differentiate it from the unrelated Sparkman & Stephens 1967 Swan 43 design.

== Production ==
The design was built by Oy Nautor AB in Finland, from 1985 until 1990, with 28 boats completed. Production averaged just 4.7 boats per year.

== Design ==
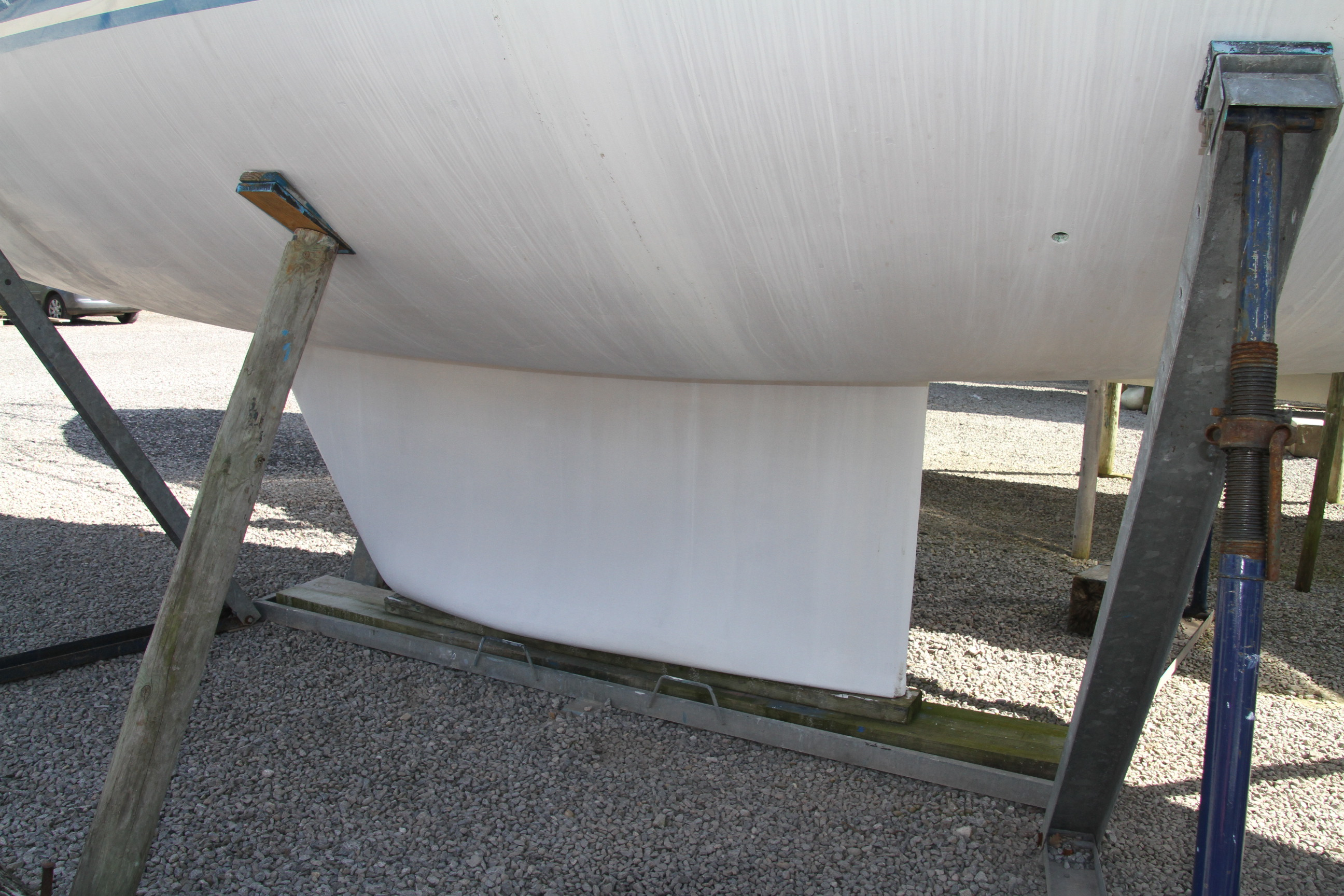
Swan 43 Holland Sheel keel

The Swan 43 Holland is a recreational keelboat, built predominantly of glassfibre, with wood trim. It has a masthead sloop rig, a raked stem, a reverse transom, an internally mounted spade-type rudder controlled by a wheel and a fixed Sheel keel or optional deep-draft keel. It displaces 24,432 lb (11,082 kg) and carries 9,040 lb (4,100 kg) of lead ballast.

The boat has a draft of 6.20 ft (1.89 m) with the standard Sheel keel and 7.7 ft (2.3 m) with the optional deep draft keel.

The boat is fitted with a Swedish Volvo Penta diesel engine of 45 hp (34 kW) for docking and manoeuvring. The fuel tank holds 70 U.S. gallons (260 L; 58 imp gal) and the fresh water tank has a capacity of 85 U.S. gallons (320 L; 71 imp gal).

The design has sleeping accommodation for four people, with a double berth in the bow cabin, a U-shaped settee and a straight settee in the main cabin and an aft cabin with a double berth. The galley is located on the port side just aft of the companionway ladder. The galley is slightly curved and is equipped with a three-burner stove, an ice box and a double sink. A navigation station is opposite the galley, on the starboard side. There are two heads, one in the bow cabin on the port side and one on the starboard side forward of the aft cabin.

The design has a hull speed of 7.83 kn (14.50 km/h).

== Operational history ==
A Sailboat Lab review reported, "The Swan 43 holland is a moderate weight sailboat which is a reasonably good performer. It is stable / stiff and has a good righting capability if capsized. It is best suited as a bluewater cruising boat. The fuel capacity is average. There is a short water supply range."

== See also ==
- List of sailing boat types
