= IMOCA 60 Banque Populaire 8 =

Sailboat

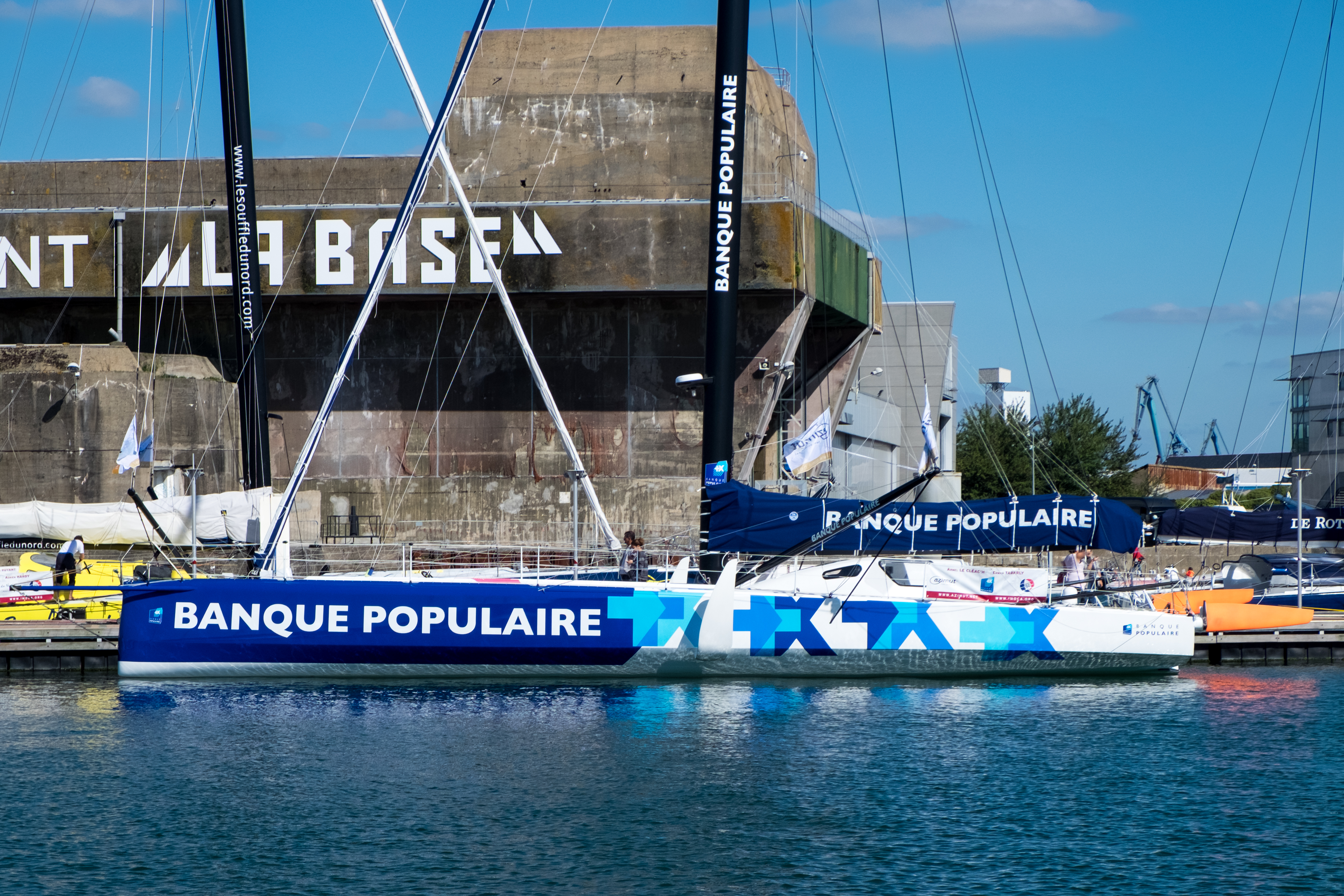

Development
- Designer: Guillaume Verdier Design Office, VPLP Design, Guillaume Verdier
- Year: 9 June 2015
- Builder: CDK Technologies
- Previous Name: Bureau Vallée 2 (2017-2021); Medalia 2(2021 Onwards)
- Launch Name: Banque Populaire 8 (New - 2017)

Racing
- Class association: IMOCA 60

The IMOCA 60 class yacht Banque Populaire VIII was launched on 9 June 2015. It was designed by Guillaume Verdier and VPLP and constructed by CDK Technologies in France.

== Ownership ==
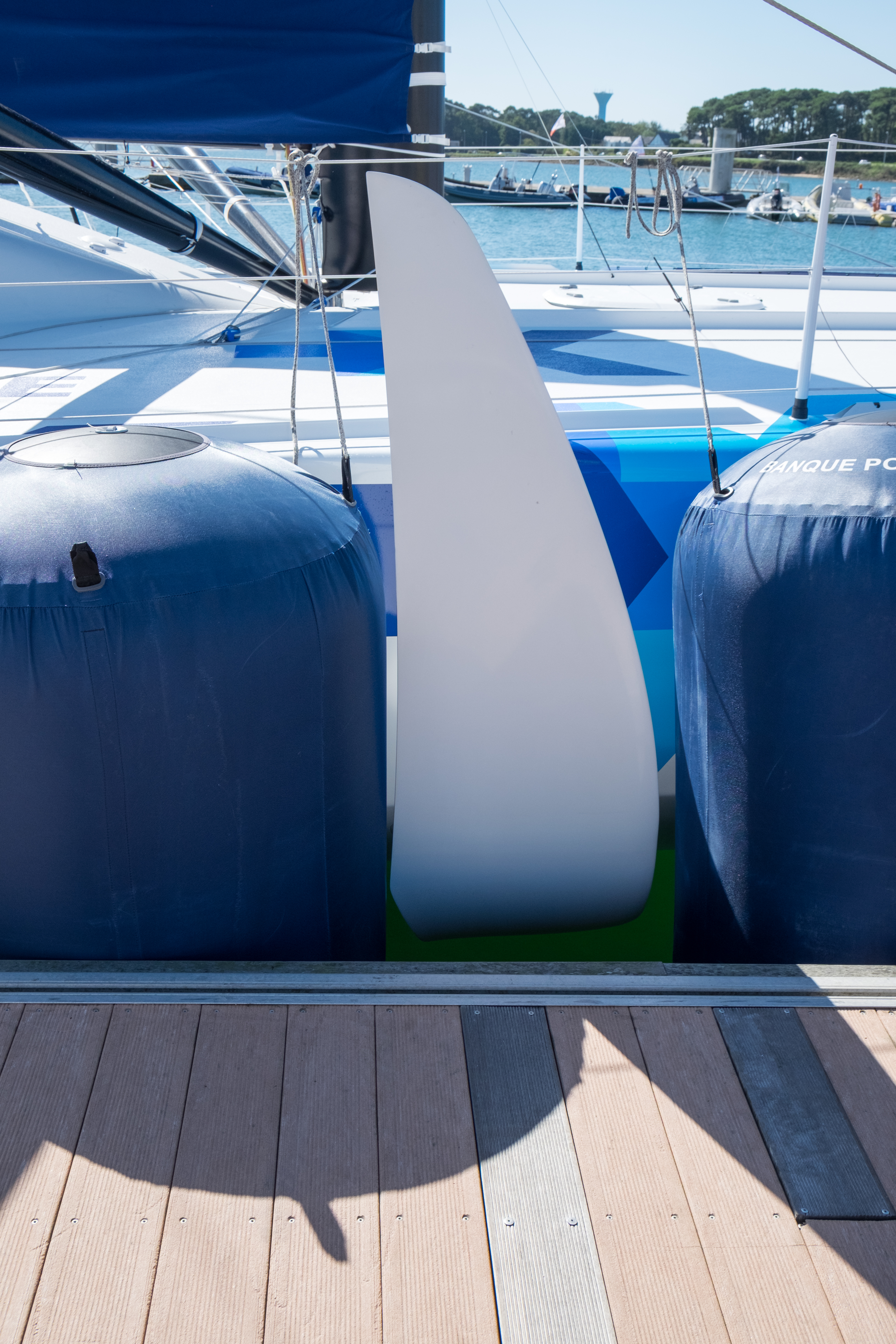

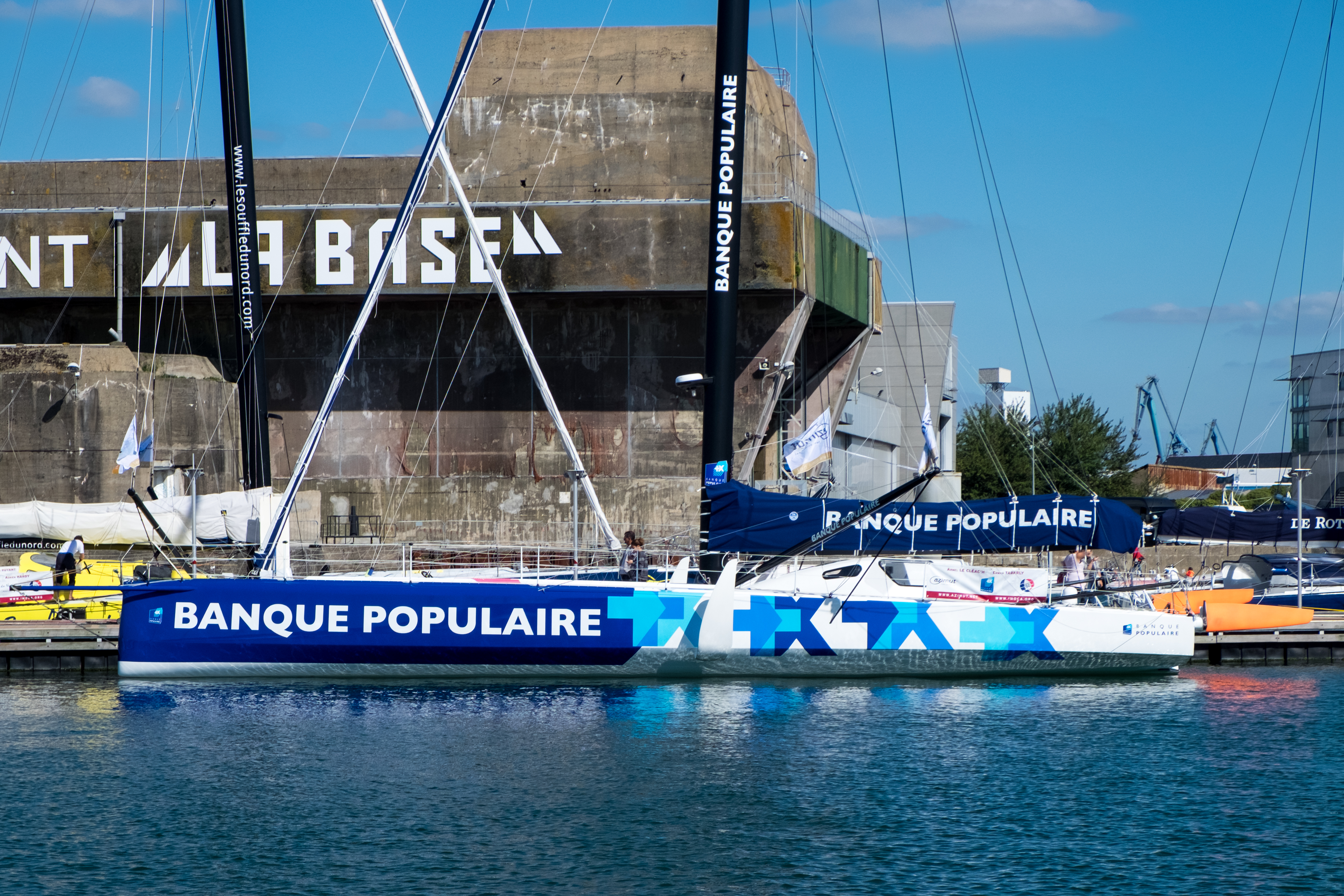

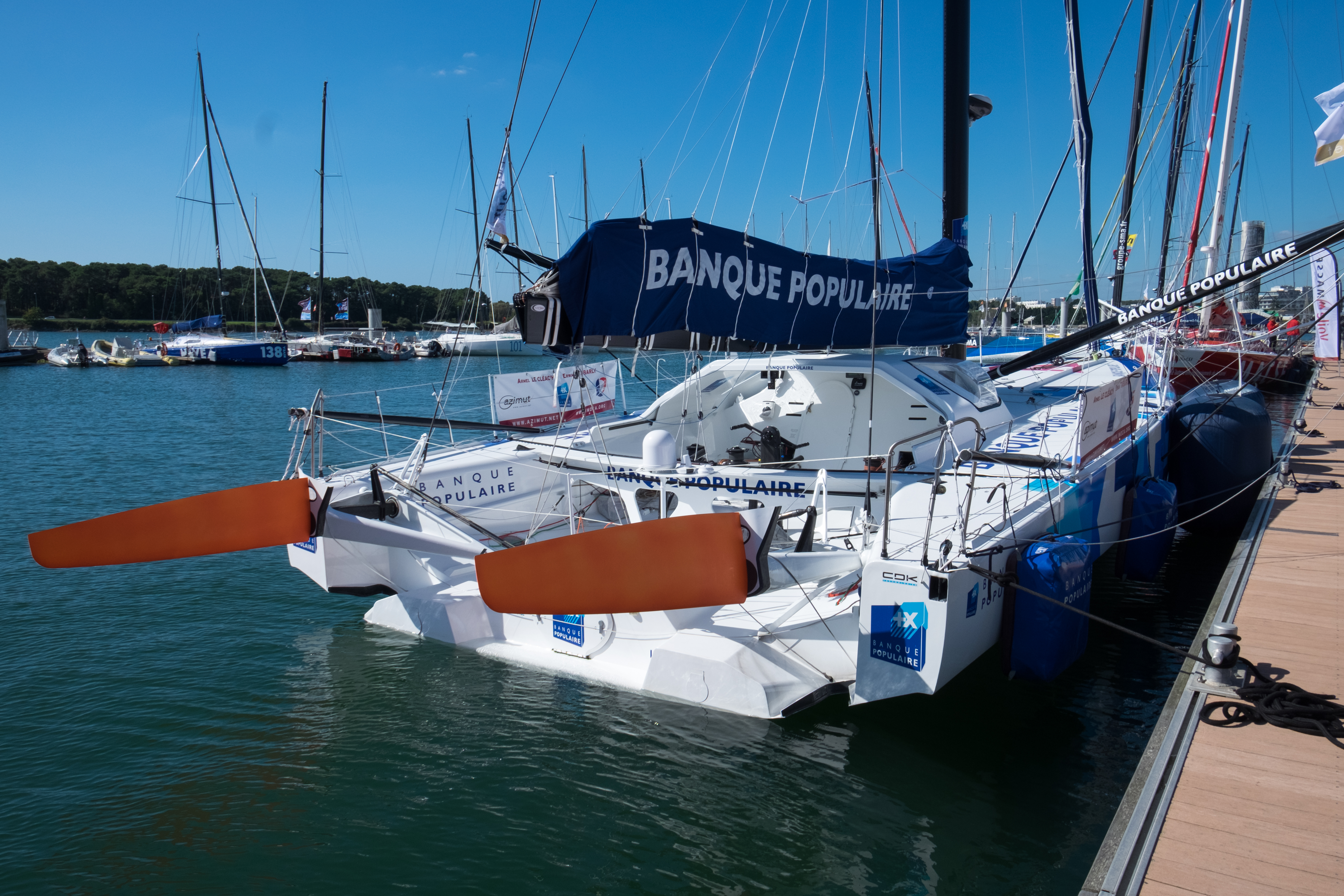

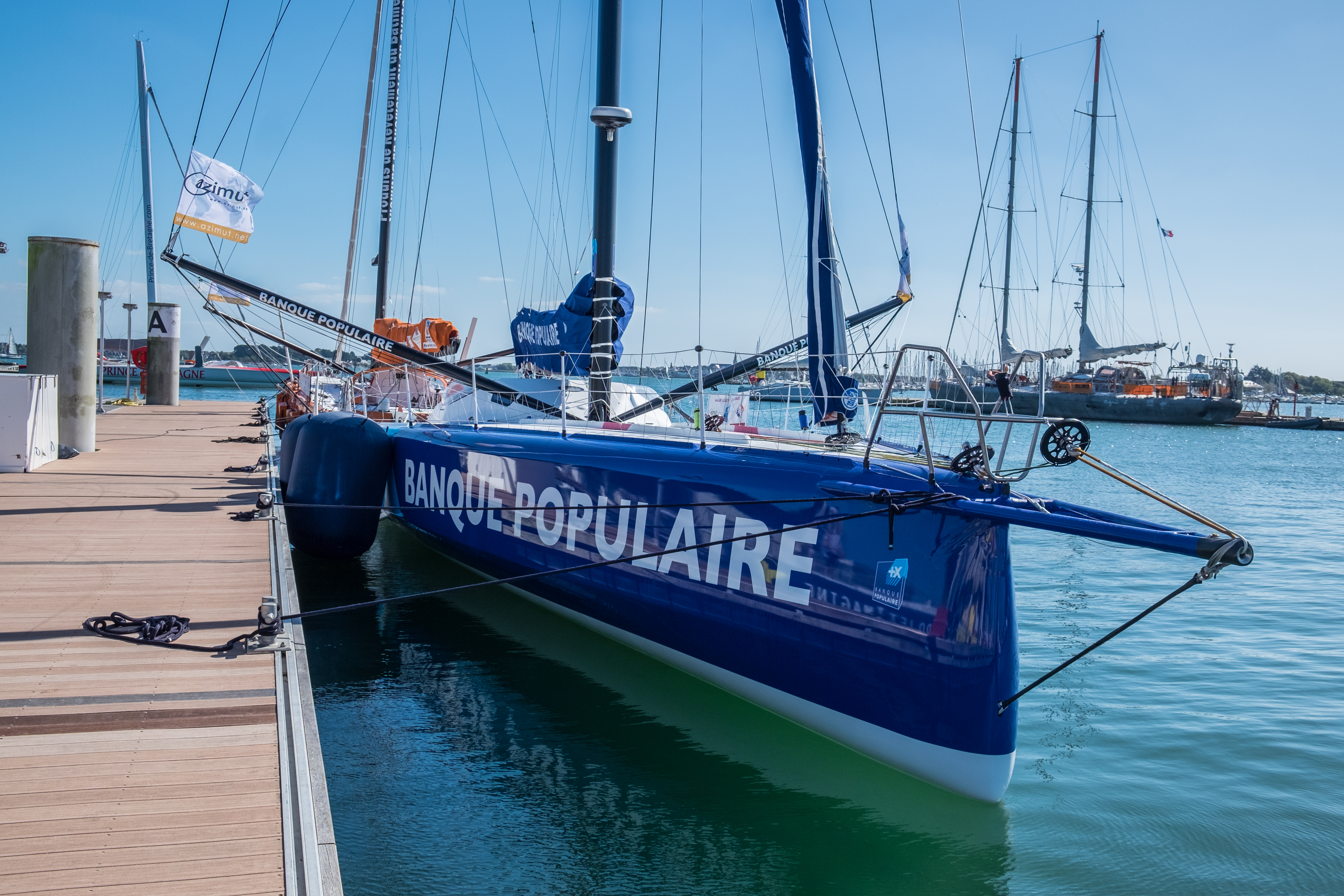

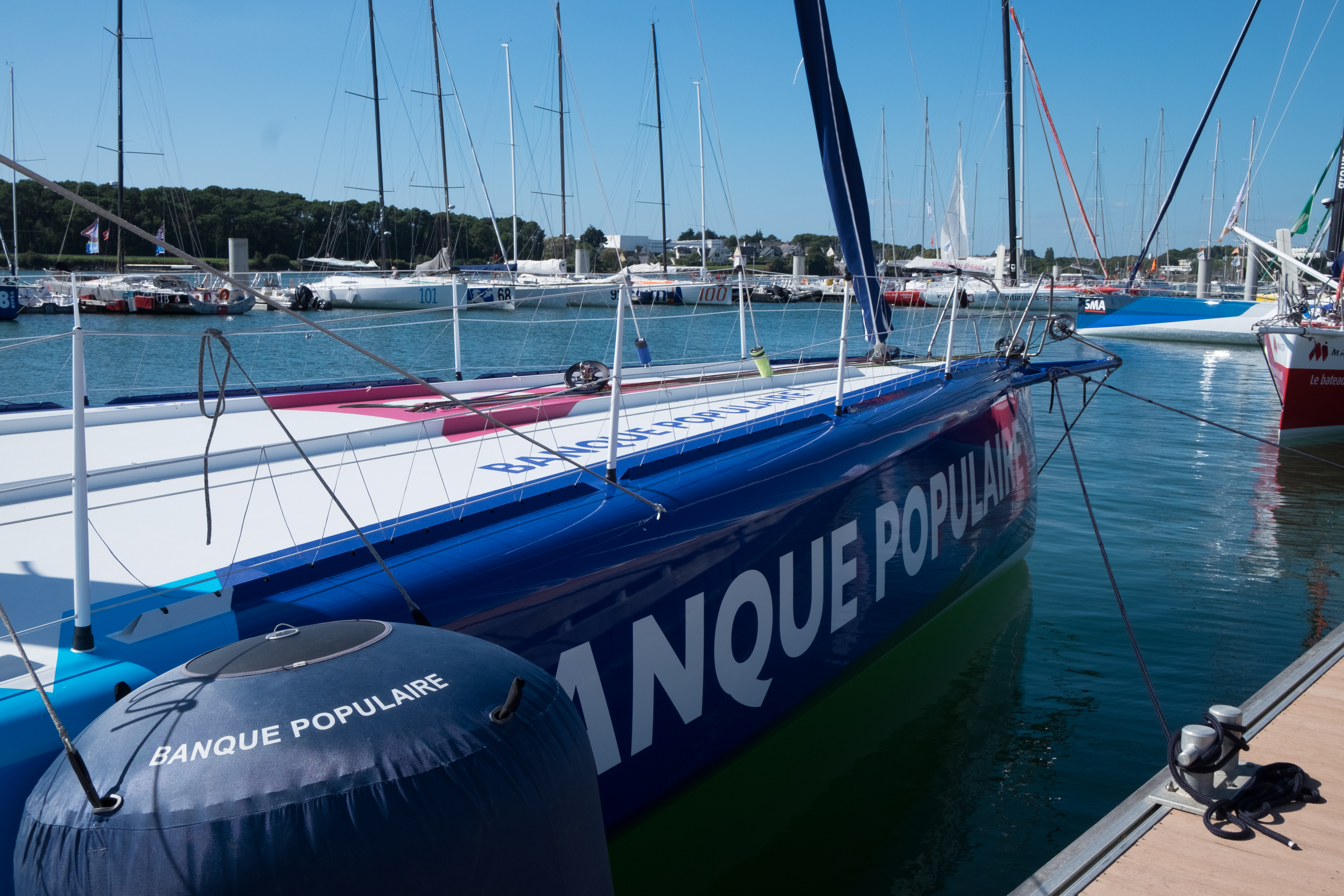

=== Banque Populaire VIII ===
The boat was commissioned by Banque Populaire Sailing Team for the 2016–2017 Vendée Globe.

=== Bureau Vallée 2 ===
In 2017 the boat was purchased by Louis Burton and based in St Malo with the intention of competing in the 2020-2021 Vendée Globe

=== Medalia 2 ===
In May 2021 the boat was purchased by Pip Hare and based in Poole to compete in the 2024-2025 Vendée Globe.

== Racing results ==
Pos	Year	Race	Class	Boat name	Skipper	Notes	Ref
Round the world races
ABD		2024-2025 Vendée Globe	IMOCA 60	Medallia 2	Pip Hare (GBR)	Dismasted approximately 700 miles of the coast of Australia	
3 / 33	2020	2020–2021 Vendée Globe	IMOCA 60	Bureau Vallée 2	Louis Burton (FRA)		
1 / 29	2016	2016–2017 Vendée Globe	IMOCA 60	Banque Populaire VIII	Armel Le Cléac'h (FRA)		
Transatlantic Races
9	2024	Transat New York Vendée	IMOCA 60	Medallia 2	Pip Hare (GBR)	Qualified for 2024-2025 Vendée Globe	
11	2024	Transat Jacques Vabre	IMOCA 60	Medallia 2	Pip Hare (GBR)		
12	2023	Retour à la Base (Transat B to B)	IMOCA 60	Medallia 2	Pip Hare (GBR)		
12	2022	Route du Rhum	IMOCA 60	Medallia 2	Pip Hare (GBR)		
13	2022	Vendée Arctique	IMOCA 60	Medallia 2	Pip Hare (GBR)		
17	2022	1000 Race	IMOCA 60	Medallia 2	Pip Hare (GBR)		
10	2019	Transat Jacques Vabre	IMOCA 60	Bureau Vallée 2	Louis Burton (FRA); Erwan Tabarly (FRA)		
2	2015	Transat Jacques Vabre	IMOCA 60	Banque Populaire VIII	Armel Le Cléac'h (FRA); Davy Beaudart (FRA)		
DNF	2018	Route du Rhum	IMOCA 60	Bureau Vallée 2	Louis Burton (FRA)		
Other Races
26	2023	Fastnet Race	Medallia 2	Pip Hare (GBR)			
	2022	Round Britain and Ireland Race	Medallia 2	Pip Hare (GBR)			
	2019	Fastnet Race	Bureau Vallée 2	Louis Burton (FRA)			
