= Pip Hare =

British yachtswoman (born 1974)

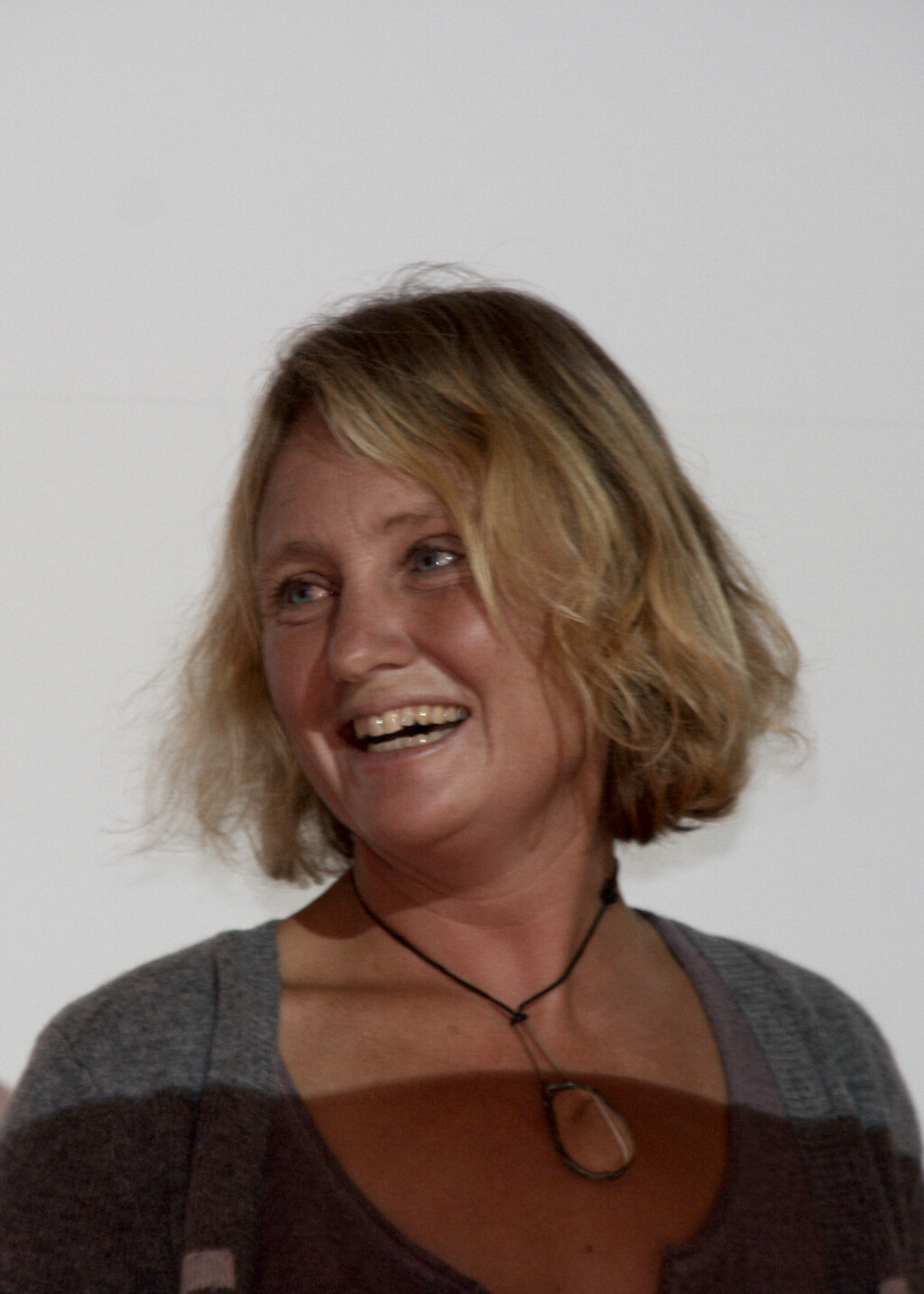
- Pip Hare
- Born: 7 February 1974 (age 52)
- Occupations: Yachtswoman, sailing coach, journalist
- Organization: Pip Hare Ocean Racing
- Spouse: Laurence Hildesley (divorced)
- Website: www.piphareoceanracing.com

Pip Hare, earlier known as Pip Hildesley, is a British yachtswoman, journalist and sailing coach. She was an entrant in the 2020 and 2024 Vendée Globe round-the-world yacht races.

== Early life ==
Hare grew up in East Anglia and began sailing at the age of 16.

== Career ==
Hare is a professional sailing coach and a writer for Yachting World. In 2013 she wrote and presented a YouTube series for the magazine, entitled “Sail Faster Sail Safer”.

Hare has competed in international yacht races such as the Transat Jacques Vabre and the Rolex Fastnet race. In 2009 she competed in the OSTAR transatlantic race. In 2017 Hare's team came third in the Three Peaks Yacht Race, despite Hare breaking her ankle 6 miles from the finish.

=== Vendée Globe ===
In October 2018, after being offered the 1999 IMOCA 60 vessel Superbigou (on rental from fellow sailor Jaanus Tamme), Hare announced her campaign to enter the 2020-2021 Vendée Globe race. The race commenced in November 2020, and Hare was one of four entrants from the United Kingdom. Hare had chosen to base her campaign in Poole. She was sponsored in part by Smartsheet. Her target was to break the then-current female record of 94d 4h 25m set by Ellen MacArthur in 2001. Hare finished the race on 12 February 2021 in 95d 11h 37m 30s, in 19th place; the same race saw the female record broken by Clarisse Crémer in a time of 87d 2h 24m.

In May 2021 Pip Hare purchased the IMOCA 60 Banque Populaire 8 which had raced in the two previous editions of the Vendee Globe (2016/17 as Banque Populaire and 2020/21 as Bureau Vallée) and based in Poole to compete in the 2024–2025 Vendée Globe. In 2023 the Pip Hare Ocean Racing team underwent an extensive refit to adapt the boat to compete with the latest designs. In November 2024 Hare competed in the 10th Vendée Globe but was dismasted approximately 800 miles south of Australia and subsequently abandoned the race.

== Racing results ==
Pos	Year	Race	Class	Boat name	Notes	Ref
Round the world races
DNF	2024	2024-2025 Vendée Globe	IMOCA 60	Medallia 2	Retired on 16/12/24 after dismasting in the Southern Ocean.	
19 / 33	2020	2020–2021 Vendée Globe	IMOCA 60	Medallia		
Ocean Races
		The Ocean Race Europe 2025	IMOCA 60	Canada Ocean Racing - Be Water Positive	Scott Shawyer (skipper) (CAN)	
Transatlantic Races
9	2024	Transat New York Vendée	IMOCA 60	Medallia 2	Qualified for 2024-2025 Vendée Globe	
11	2024	Transat Jacques Vabre	IMOCA 60	Medallia 2		
11	2023	Retour à la Base (Transat B to B)	IMOCA 60	Medallia 2		
12	2022	Route du Rhum	IMOCA 60	Medallia 2		
13	2022	Vendée Arctique	IMOCA 60	Medallia 2		
17	2022	1000 Race	IMOCA 60	Medallia 2		
24	2019	Transat Jacques Vabre	IMOCA 60	Medallia		
15	2019	1000 Race	IMOCA 60	Medallia		
9	2015	Transat Jacques Vabre	Class40			
15	2015	Newport Bermuda Race				
16	2013	Mini Transat Race				
17	2011	Mini Transat Race				
Other Races
