= The Ocean Race Europe =

Yacht race

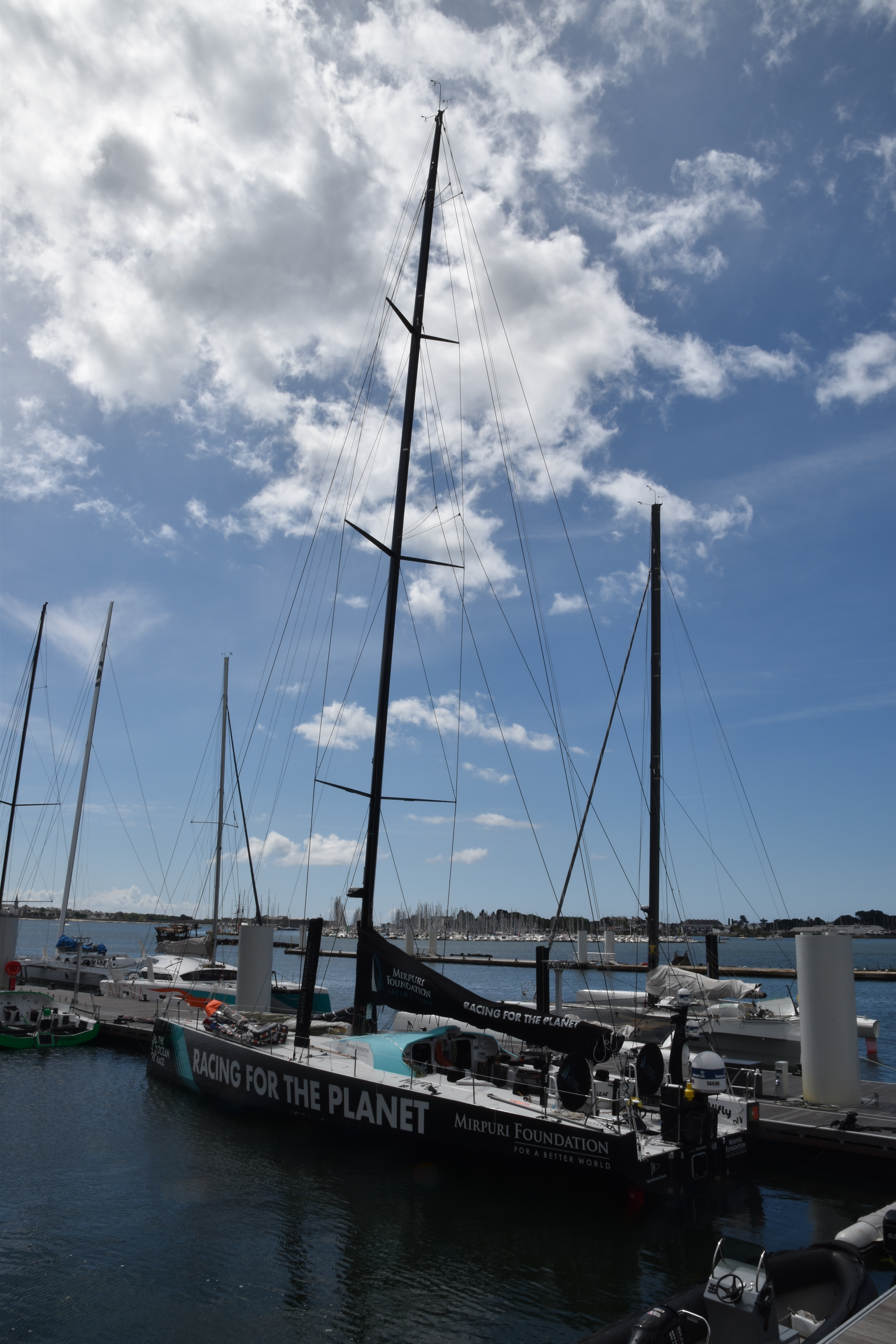
- The Mirpuri Foundation Racing Team's VO65 docked in Lorient, France before the start of the 2021 Ocean Race Europe.
- First held: 25 May 2021
- Organiser: The Ocean Race
- Yachts used: IMOCA 60, Volvo Ocean 65 (VO65)
- Start: Lorient, France (2021)
- Finish: Genoa, Italy (2021)
- Competitors: 12
- Legs: 4
- Website: www.theoceanrace.com/en/the-ocean-race-europe

The Ocean Race Europe is an offshore yacht race around Europe created and run by the organisers of The Ocean Race. Its inaugural edition is the 2021 Ocean Race Europe, which began 25 May 2021 as a three-leg course from Lorient, France to Genoa, Italy. A second edition started on 10 August 2025

The Ocean Race Europe is planned to take place every four years, with a two-year interval between installments of The Ocean Race Europe and The Ocean Race. This would allow teams to take part in an Ocean Race-related competition every two years.

== Background ==
In 2018, The Ocean Race was taken under new ownership by The Ocean Race 1973 SLU, a successor company to Atlant Ocean Racing. This ended the twenty-year-long period of ownership of The Ocean Race by the Volvo Group and Volvo Cars, although Volvo was retained as a sponsor and premier partner. A ten-year plan confirming future editions of The Ocean Race on a four-year cycle was announced in July 2020.

After the 2021 Ocean Race was postponed to 2022–23 because of the COVID-19 pandemic, the event's owners carried out a feasibility study on a potential European race in 2021. The 2021 Ocean Race Europe was announced in October 2020, with entries opening in January 2021. Twelve teams were announced for the 2021 Ocean Race Europe; seven teams competed in Volvo Ocean 65s (VO65s), while five others competed in IMOCA 60s.

== Yachts ==
The 2021 Ocean Race Europe used foiling IMOCA 60s and the one-design VO65s. The two classes compete at the same time and along the same route, with separate winners and prizes in each class. All boats are fully-crewed and have female crew members on board. Both the IMOCA 60s and VO65s will contest the 2023 Ocean Race.

== Overview ==
Edition	Class	Legs	In-port races	Entries	Start	Finish	Winning yacht	Winning skipper
2021	IMOCA 60	3	2	5	(France) Lorient	(Italy) Genoa	Offshore Team Germany	Robert Stanjek
2021	Volvo Ocean 65	3	2	7	(France) Lorient	(Italy) Genoa	Mirpuri Foundation Racing Team	Yoann Richomme
2025	IMOCA 60	5	1	7	(Germany) Kiel	(Montenegro) Boka Bay	Biotherm	Paul Meilhat

== 2021 edition ==
The 2021 Ocean Race Europe began 25 May 2021 on a three-leg course from Lorient to Genoa, with stops in Cascais, Portugal and Alicante, Spain.

Route
#	event	start date	start place → finish place
01	Leg 1	29 May 2021	(France) Lorient → (Portugal) Cascais
02	In-port race	5 June 2021	(Portugal) Cascais "Mirpuri Foundation Sailing Trophy"
03	Leg 2	6 June 2021	(Portugal) Cascais → (Spain) Alicante
04	Leg 3	13 June 2021	(Spain) Alicante → (Italy) Genoa
05	In-port race	19 June 2021	(Italy) Genoa "Genova Coastal Race"

A ten-day, four-leg race from Klaipėda, Lithuania to the South Swedish Waypoint was organised by four of the seven VO65 teams in the lead-up to the 2021 Ocean Race Europe. Team Childhood 1 took overall victory.

The first leg of the 2021 Ocean Race Europe, from Lorient to Cascais, commenced on 29 May 2021. It was won in the IMOCA 60 class by CORUM L'Épargne, and in the VO65 class by The Austrian Ocean Race Project.

The first of two coastal races was held in Cascais on 5 June 2021. It was won in the IMOCA 60 class by Offshore Team Germany, and in the VO65 class by Mirpuri Foundation Racing Team.

The second leg of the 2021 Ocean Rage Europe, from Cascais to Alicante, commenced on 6 June 2021. 11th Hour Racing Team were forced to return to Cascais after a collision that damaged their port foil. The team resumed racing later that same day after their damaged foil was removed.

	Skipper	Leg 1 (France) (Portugal)	In-port race (Portugal)	Leg 2 (Portugal) (Spain)	Leg 3 (Spain) (Italy)	In-port race (Italy)	Total
Volvo Ocean 65 class
(Portugal) Mirpuri Foundation Racing Team	Yoann Richomme	1	3	7	7	3	21
Sailing Poland	Bouwe Bekking	4	1	5	5	2	17
(Netherlands) AkzoNobel Ocean Racing	Chris Nicholson	3	2	6	6	0	17
(Sweden) (Netherlands) Team Childhood I	Simeon Tienpont	5	0	3	4	0	12
(Austria) The Austrian Ocean Race Project	Gerwin Jansen	7	0	2	1	0	10
(Mexico) Viva México	Erik Brockmann	2	0	3	3	1	9
(Lithuania) Ambersail 2	Rokas Milevičius	6	0	1	2	0	9
IMOCA 60 class
Offshore Team Germany	Robert Stanjek	2	3	4	5	2	16
(United States) 11th Hour Racing Team	Charlie Enright	4	2	3	3	3	15
(France) LinkedOut	Thomas Ruyant	3	1	5	4	1	14
(France) CORUM L' Épargne	Nicolas Troussel	5	0	1	1	0	7
(France) Bureau Vallée	Louis Burton	1	0	2	2	0	5

== 2025 edition ==
The second edition started on 10 August 2025 in Kiel, Germany, and ended with a coastal race in Boka Bay, Montenegro, on 20 September 2025.

At the start in Kiel, the boats of Holcim-PRB and Allagrande Mapei Racing were involved in an accident and could not finish the leg. The jury decided that it was Allagrande's fault and Holcim received the average points of their other leg results for leg 1.

Route
#	Start date	Start place → finish place
1	10 August 2025	(Germany) Kiel to (United Kingdom) Portsmouth
2	17 August 2025	(United Kingdom) Portsmouth via (Portugal) Matosinhos* to (Spain) Cartagena
3	26 August 2025	(Spain) Cartagena to (France) Nice
4	31 August 2025	(France) Nice to (Italy) Genova
5	7 September 2025	(Italy) Genova to (Montenegro) Boka Bay
6	20 September 2025	Coastal race in Boka Bay
* Intermediate Scoring

Participants and results
Skipper	Yacht	SG* 1	Leg 1	SG 2	Leg 2.1	Leg 2.2	SG 3	Leg 3	SG 4	Leg 4	SG 5	Leg 5	Coastal	Total
(France) Paul Meilhat	(France) Biotherm	2	7	2	7	7	2	7	2	5	0	7	7	55
(France) Yoann Richomme	(France) Paprec Arkéa	1	5	1	6	5	1	4	0	6	2	3	6	40
(Netherlands) Rosalin Kuiper	(Switzerland) Holcim-PRB	0	5.5^{(x)}	0	5	6	0	6	1	4	0	6	5	38.5
(Germany) Boris Herrmann	(Germany) (Monaco) Malizia-Seaexplorer	0	6	0	4	3	0	3	0	2	0	5	4	27
(Italy) Ambrogio Beccaria	(Italy) Allagrande Mapei Racing	0	0	0	3	4	0	5	0	7	1	4	2	26
(Canada) Scott Shawyer	Canada Ocean Racing – Be Water Positiv	0	4	0	2	2	0	2	0	3	0	2	3	18
(Switzerland) Alan Roura	(Switzerland) (Saudi Arabia) Team Amaala	0	3	0	1	1	0	1	0	1	0	1	1	9
*SG: Scoring gate		(x) Average points from other legs												

== See also ==
- List of Volvo Ocean Race sailors
