= Volvo Ocean 65 Turn the Tide on Plastic =

Turn the Tide on Plastic
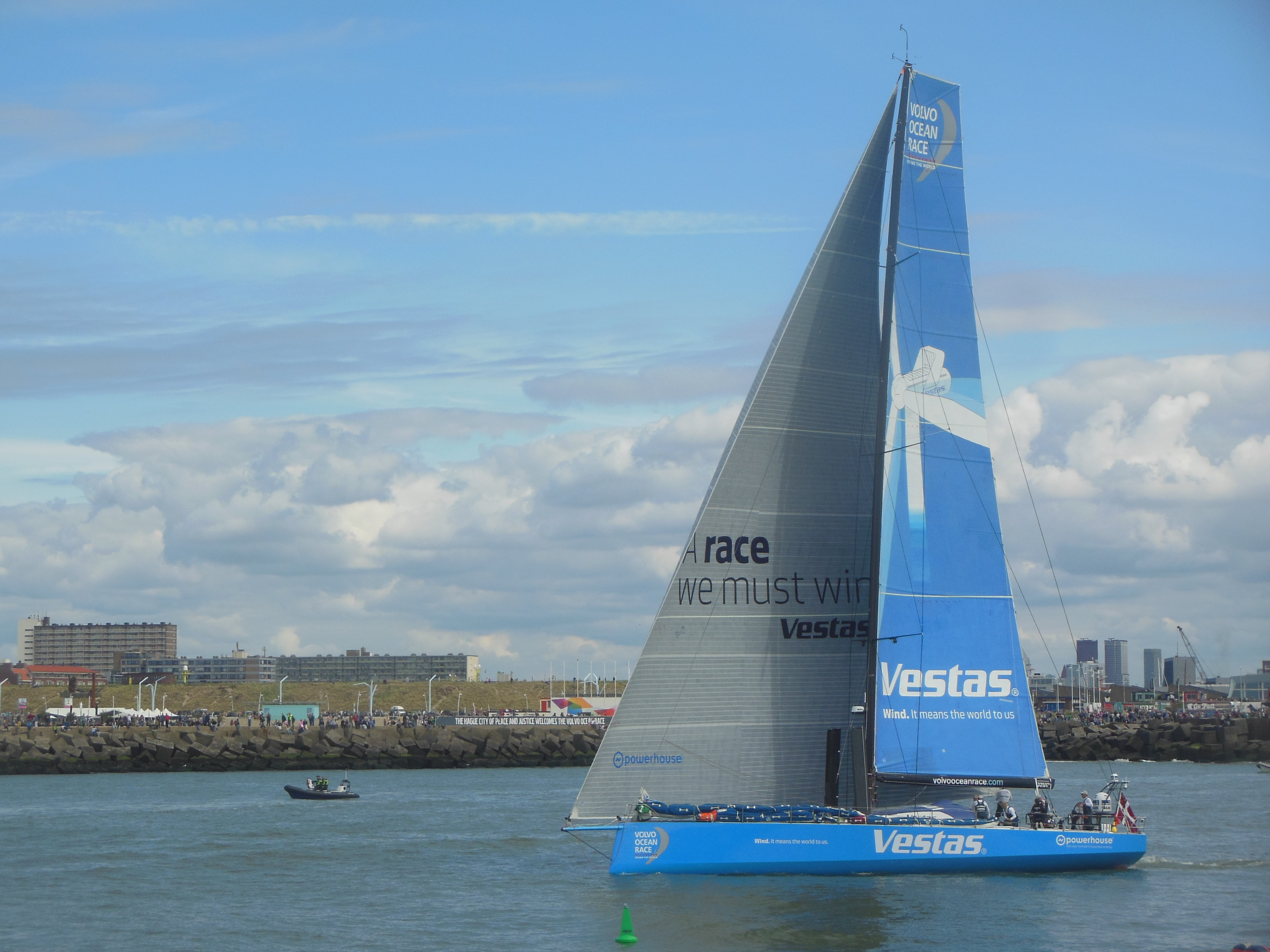
- Team Vestas Wind in 2015.
- Class: Volvo Ocean 65
- Designer(s): Farr Yacht Design

Racing career
- Skippers: Chris Nicholson; Dee Caffari

Turn the Tide on Plastic is a Volvo Ocean 65 yacht. As Team Vestas Wind, she finished seventh in the 2014–15 Volvo Ocean Race skippered by Chris Nicholson.

Following the race, the boat was refitted for the 2017–18 Volvo Ocean Race and renamed.

== 2017-2018 Volvo Ocean Race ==
The crew was:

- Dee Caffari (skipper)
- Nico Lunven
- Martin Strömberg
- Liz Wardley
- Annalise Murphy
- Francesca Clapcich
- Bianca Cook
- Lucas Chapman
- Bleddyn Mon
- Bernardo Freitas
- Henry Bomby
- Frederico Melo
- Elodie Mettraux

== 2014-2015 Volvo Ocean Race ==
As Team Vestas Wind, this was the 7th boat to announce it is participation to the race on September 1, 2014, following a press release from Alicante, Spain.

The yacht finished last overall as she only completed 3 of the 9 legs in the race due to the grounding incident.

The crew was:

=== Crew ===
- Chris Nicholson, Australia. Skipper. 5th Volvo Ocean Race.
- Nicolai Sehested, Denmark. Boat captain.
- Peter Wibroe, Denmark.
- Tony Rae, New Zealand. 5th Volvo Ocean Race
- Simeon Tienpont, Netherlands, crew member.
- Tom Addis, Australia, Navigator.
- Robert Salthouse, New Zealand, 4th Volvo Ocean Race
- Tom Johnson, Australia, number 1, Coxswain.
- Wouter Verbraak, Netherlands. Navigation. 3rd Volvo Ocean Race
- Maciel Cicchetti, Argentina. Coxswain. 2nd Volvo Ocean Race.
- Brian Carlin, Ireland. Reporter.

=== Grounding ===
On November 30, 2014, during a night navigation, the yacht grounded on a coral atoll of St. Brandon. This happened 10 days after leaving Cape Town, on the way to Abu Dhabi. The yacht was damaged and repaired the race for the last 2 legs. The grounding was because the atoll was not visible on the low scale chart. The crew was rescued by the Mauritius coast guard the next morning. The cause of the grounding was a combination of human error and the features of the navigation software. The software did not show the atoll on the route planning display at low or medium zoom levels, while the atoll would have been shown in the navigation chart display at those zoom levels. The crew on watch did not notice there was a wrong chart display on.

After the grounding the yacht was salvaged and repaired and managed to compete in the final legs 8 and 9 with a new navigator crew.
