= Brad Jackson (sailor) =

New Zealand sailor

Brad Jackson is a New Zealand sailor that has sailed in multiple Volvo Ocean Races.

== Sailing career ==
Jackson sailing career began with NZ Endeavour in the 1993-94 Whitbread Round the World Race. He then joined Merit Cup for the 1997-98 Whitbread Round the World Race, followed by Team Tyco in the 2001-02 Volvo Ocean Race.

He was a member of ABN Amro I in 2005-06, Ericsson 4 in 2008-09 and Mar Mostro in 2011-12.

He coached Team SCA in the 2014-15 edition.

For the 2017–18 Volvo Ocean Race, Jackson was initially appointed as a watch captain for Team AkzoNobel but was promoted to skipper after Simeon Tienpont. Tienpont was then reinstated by an arbitration panel, resulting in Jackson's withdrawal from leg 1.
