= 2023 The Ocean Race =

Around-the-world yacht race

The Ocean Race 2022–23
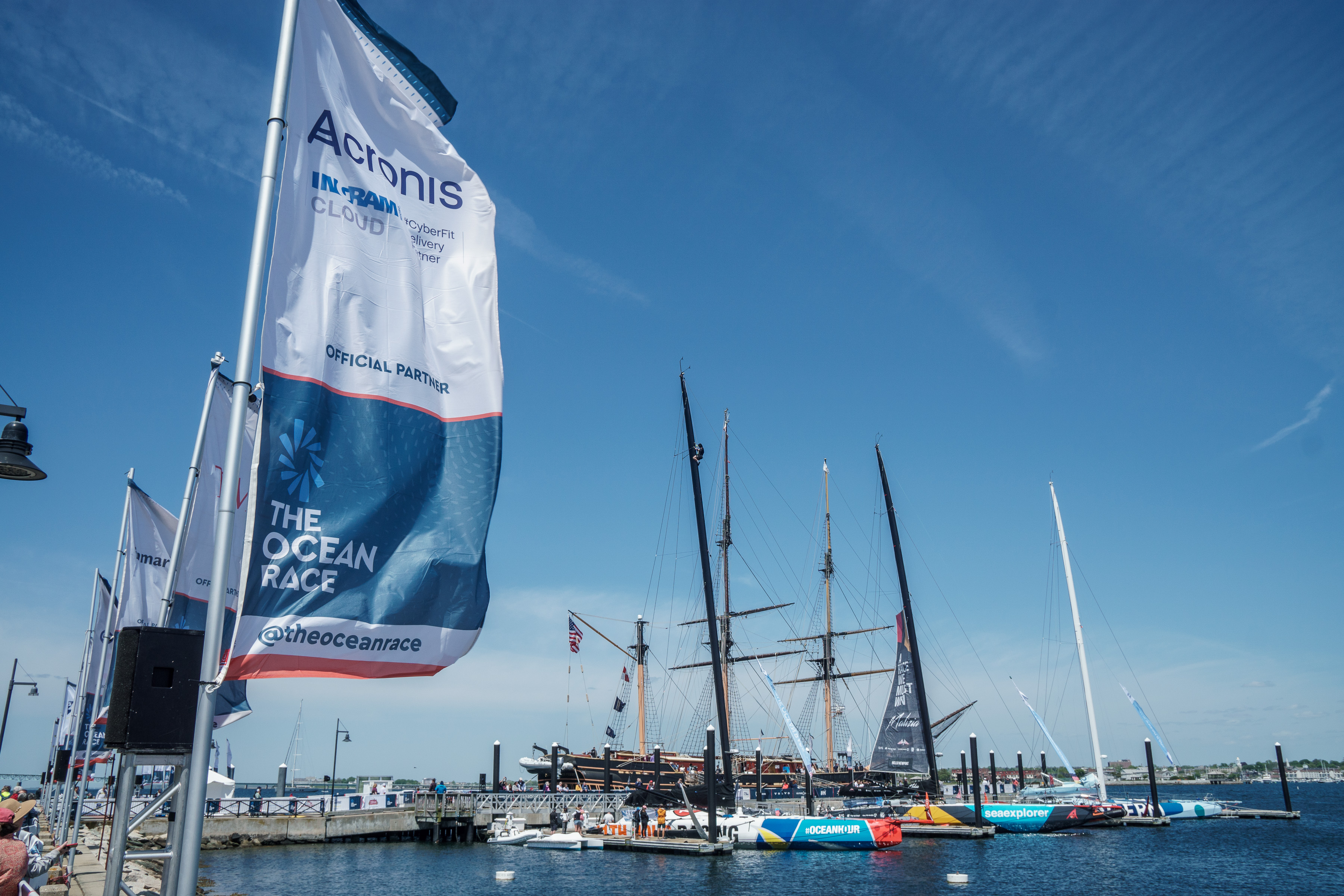
- 11th Hour, Malizia, and Biotherm at Newport, Rhode Island

Event title
- Edition: 14th
- Dates: 8 January 2023 – 1 July 2023
- Yachts: IMOCA 60; Volvo Ocean 65

Competitors
- Competitors: 11 teams 5 teams in the IMOCA 60 class, 6 teams in the Volvo Ocean 65 class

Results
- Winner: IMOCA 60 class: (United States) 11th Hour Racing Team Volvo Ocean 65 class: (Poland) WindWhisper Racing Team

The Ocean Race 2023 was the 14th edition of the round-the-world The Ocean Race. It started in Alicante, Spain.

The COVID-19 pandemic forced the organizers to delay the race planned for 2021–22.

== Participants ==
A total of 11 boats participated in the race, 5 in the IMOCA 60 class and 6 in the Volvo Ocean 65 class.

IMOCA

| (United States) 11th Hour Racing | GUYOT environnement - Team Europe | (Switzerland) Holcim - PRB |
|---|---|---|
| (United States) Charlie Enright (skipper) (Switzerland) Justine Mettraux (crew member) (United Kingdom) Simon Fisher (navigator) (Italy) Francesca Clapcich (crew member) (Australia) (United Kingdom) Jack Bouttell (watch leader) (United States) Amory Ross (onboard reporter) | (France) Benjamin Dutreux (skipper) (Germany) Robert Stanjek (skipper) (United Kingdom) Annie Lush (crew Member) (Germany) Phillip Kasüske (crew member) (France) Sébastien Simon (crew member) (Spain) Támara Echegoyen (crew member) (France) Charles Drapeau (onboard reporter) | (France) Kevin Escoffier (skipper) (United Kingdom) Abby Ehler (crew member) (United Kingdom) Sam Goodchild (crew member) (France) Fabien Delahaye (crew member) (Germany) Susann Beucke (crew member) (France) Tom Laperche (crew member) (France) Julien Champolion (onboard reporter) |
| (Germany) Team Malizia | (France) Biotherm Racing | |
| (Germany) Boris Herrmann (skipper) (United Kingdom) Will Harris (crew member) (France) Nicolas Lunven (crew member) (Netherlands) Rosalin Kuiper (crew member) (France) Axelle Pillain (crew member) (France) Yann Eliès (crew member) (France) Antoine Auriol (onboard reporter) | (France) Paul Meilhat (skipper) (France) Anthony Marchand (crew member) (France) Amélie Grassi (crew member) (France) Damien Seguin (crew member) (United Kingdom) Samantha Davies (crew member) (France) Ronan Gladu (onboard reporter) (France) Anne Beaugé (onboard reporter) (China) Zhang Minghao (onboard reporter) | |

VO65

| (Portugal) Mirpuri Foundation Racing Team | (Netherlands) Team JAJO | (Mexico) Viva México |
|---|---|---|
| (Portugal) António Fontes (skipper) (Portugal) Frederico Pinheiro de Melo (crew member) (Portugal) Matilde Pinheiro de Melo (crew member) (Portugal) Mariana Lobato (crew member) (Portugal) Francisca Pinho (crew member) (Portugal) Hélder Basílio (crew member) (Portugal) Diogo Cayolla (crew member) (Portugal) Francisco Maia (crew member) (Portugal) Francisco Cai-Água (crew member) (Portugal) Paulo Mirpuri (crew member) (Portugal) Robin Christol (onboard reporter) | (Netherlands) Jelmer van Beek (skipper) (Netherlands) Rutger Vos (crew member) (Netherlands) Jorden van Rooijen (crew member) (Netherlands) Bouwe Bekking (crew member) (Poland) Maja Micińska (crew member) (United Kingdom) Greg Lowden (crew member) (Netherlands) Laura van Veen (crew member) (Netherlands) Max Deckers (crew member) (Spain) Simbad Quiroga (crew member) (United Kingdom) Joy Eilish Fitzgerald (crew member) (Netherlands) Brend Schuil (onboard reporter) | (Mexico) Erik Brockmann (skipper) (Spain) Roberto Bermúdez (crew member) (Spain) Jaime Arbones (crew member) (Mexico) Juan Varela (crew member) (Netherlands) Annemieke Bes (crew member) (Spain) Carlos Bermúdez (crew member) (Mexico) Tania Elías Calles (crew member) (Mexico) Juan Luís Medina (crew member) (Uruguay) Dominique Knüppel (crew member) |
| (Lithuania) Ambersail II | (Poland) WindWhisper Racing Team | (Austria) (Italy) Austrian Ocean Racing p/b Team Genova |
| (Lithuania) Rokas Milevičius (skipper) (Lithuania) Saulius Pajarskas (crew member) (Poland) Wiktor Kobryń (crew member) (Lithuania) Deimantė Jarmalavičiūtė (crew member) (Ukraine) Anastasia Kolesnichenko (crew member) (Lithuania) Martin Volkovicki (crew member) (Lithuania) Jonas Drąsutavičius (crew member) (Lithuania) Domantas Juškevičius (crew member) (Ukraine) Sofiia Naumenko (crew member) (Lithuania) Martynas Karpavičius (crew member) (Lithuania) Sigitas Babilius (onboard reporter) | (Spain) Pablo Arrarte (skipper) (Poland) Stan Bajerski (crew member) (Poland) Szymon Cierzan (crew member) (Australia) Liz Wardley (crew member) (Poland) Marcin Sutkowski (crew member) (Poland) Mateusz Gwóźdź (crew member) (Poland) Magdalena Kwaśna (crew member) (Spain) Willy Altadill (crew member) (Norway) Aksel Magdahl (crew member) (Netherlands) Arianne van de Loosdrecht (crew member) (Spain) Antonio Cuervas-Mons (crew member) (Poland) Tomasz Piotrowski (onboard reporter) | (Netherlands) Gerwin Jansen (skipper) (Netherlands) Jolbert van Dijk (crew member) (United Kingdom) Ruaridh Wright (crew member) (Belgium) Michiel Goegebeur (crew member) (United Kingdom) Deborah Blair (crew member) (Italy) Alberto Riva (crew member) (Austria) Oliver Kobale (co-skipper/boat captain) (Austria) Anna Luschan (crew member) (Canada) Daniel Dagenais-Gaw (crew member) (Italy) Cecilia Zorzi (crew member) (Austria) Stefan Leitner (onboard reporter) |

== Route ==
The route and stopover dates for the 2023 edition have been announced in December 2021. The VO65 class boats only participate in the first and the last two legs, for "The Ocean Race VO65 Sprint Cup".

| # | event | start date | start place → finish place | distance |
|---|---|---|---|---|
| 01 | In-port race | 8 January 2023 | (Spain) Alicante | |
| 02 | Leg 1 | 15 January 2023 | (Spain) Alicante → Cape Verde | 1,900 nmi (3,500 km) |
| 03 | Leg 2 (IMOCA 60 only) | 25 January 2023 | Cape Verde → (South Africa) Cape Town | 4,600 nmi (8,500 km) |
| 04 | In-port race (IMOCA 60 only) | 24 February 2023 | (South Africa) Cape Town | |
| 05 | Leg 3 (IMOCA 60 only) | 26 February 2023 | (South Africa) Cape Town → (Brazil) Itajaí | 12,750 nmi (23,610 km) |
| 06 | In-port race (IMOCA 60 only) | 21 April 2023 | (Brazil) Itajaí | |
| 07 | Leg 4 (IMOCA 60 only) | 23 April 2023 | (Brazil) Itajaí → (United States) Newport, Rhode Island | 5,550 nmi (10,280 km) |
| 08 | In-port race (IMOCA 60 only) | 20 May 2023 | (United States) Newport, Rhode Island | |
| 09 | Leg 5 (IMOCA 60 only) | 21 May 2023 | (United States) Newport, Rhode Island → (Denmark) Aarhus | 3,500 nmi (6,500 km) |
| 10 | In-port race | 4 June 2023 | (Denmark) Aarhus | |
| 11 | Leg 6 | 8 June 2023 | (Denmark) Aarhus → (Netherlands) The Hague | 800 nmi (1,500 km) |
| 12 | In-port race | 13 June 2023 | (Netherlands) The Hague | |
| 13 | Leg 7 | 15 June 2023 | (Netherlands) The Hague → (Italy) Genoa | 2,200 nmi (4,100 km) |
| 14 | In-port race | 1 July 2023 | (Italy) Genoa | |

nmi: nautical miles.

== Results ==
=== Overall standings ===
| | Leg 1 (Spain) (Cape Verde) | Leg 2 (Cape Verde) (South Africa) | Leg 3* (South Africa) (Brazil) | | Leg 4 (Brazil) (United States) | Leg 5 (United States) (Denmark) | Leg 6 (Denmark) (Netherlands) | Leg 7 (Netherlands) (Italy) | Penalty | Total |
|---|---|---|---|---|---|---|---|---|---|---|
Volvo Ocean 65 class
| (Poland) WindWhisper Racing Team | 6 | not part of the Volvo Ocean 65 route | | | | | 6 | 6 | 0 | 18 |
| (Netherlands) Team JAJO | 5 | not part of the Volvo Ocean 65 route | | | | | 4 | 5 | 0 | 14 |
| (Austria) Austrian Ocean Racing p/b Team Genova | 4 | not part of the Volvo Ocean 65 route | | | | | 3 | 3 | 0 | 10 |
| (Mexico) Viva México | 2 | not part of the Volvo Ocean 65 route | | | | | 2 | 4 | 0 | 8 |
| (Portugal) Mirpuri Foundation Racing Team | 0 RET | not part of the Volvo Ocean 65 route | | | | | 5 | 2 | 0 | 7 |
| (Lithuania) Ambersail 2 | 3 | not part of the Volvo Ocean 65 route | | | | | 0 DNS | 0 DNS | 0 | 3 |
IMOCA 60 class
| (United States) 11th Hour Racing Team | 4 | 3 | 3 | 3 | 5 | 10 | 5 | 4 RED | 0 | 37 |
| (Switzerland) Holcim - PRB | 5 | 5 | 5 | 4 | 0 RET | 8 | 4 | 3 | 0 | 34 |
| (Germany) Team Malizia | 3 | 2 | 4 | 5 | 4 | 6 | 3 | 5 | 0 | 32 |
| (France) Biotherm Racing | 2 | 4 | 2 | 2 | 3 | 4 | 2 | 4 | 0 | 23 |
| GUYOT environnement - Team Europe | 1 | 1 | 0 RET | | 0 RET | 0 DNS | 1 | 0 RET | -1 | 2 |

*Leg 3 was scored two times.
RET - Team retired from the leg
DNS - Did not start
RED - Redress

=== In-port series ===
| | Ali (Spain) | CT (South Africa) | Ita (Brazil) | NP (United States) | Aar (Denmark) | Hag (Netherlands) | Gen (Italy) | Total |
|---|---|---|---|---|---|---|---|---|
Volvo Ocean 65 class
| (Poland) WindWhisper Racing Team | 6 | not part of the Volvo Ocean 65 route | | | 6 | 5 | 2 | 19 |
| (Netherlands) Team JAJO | 0 DNF | not part of the Volvo Ocean 65 route | | | 5 | 6 | 6 | 17 |
| (Portugal) Mirpuri Foundation Racing Team | 0 DNF | not part of the Volvo Ocean 65 route | | | 3 | 4 | 5 | 12 |
| (Mexico) Viva México | 0 DNF | not part of the Volvo Ocean 65 route | | | 4 | 2 | 4 | 10 |
| (Austria) Austrian Ocean Racing p/b Team Genova | 0 DNF | not part of the Volvo Ocean 65 route | | | 2 | 3 | 3 | 8 |
| (Lithuania) Ambersail 2 | 0 DNF | not part of the Volvo Ocean 65 route | | | 0 DNS | 0 DNS | 0 DNS | 0 |
IMOCA 60 class
| (United States) 11th Hour Racing Team | 4 | 4 | 5 | 4 | 3 | 4 | 5 | 29 |
| (Germany) Team Malizia | 5 | 3 | 3 | 5 | 2 | 3 | 4 | 25 |
| (France) Biotherm Racing | 3 | 0 DNS | 4 | 2 | 5 | 2 | 3 | 19 |
| (Switzerland) Holcim - PRB | 0 DNF | 5 | 2 | 3 | 4 | 1 | 2 | 17 |
| GUYOT environnement - Team Europe | 2 | 2 | 1 | 0 DNS | 0 DNS | 5 | 0 DNS | 10 |

DNF - Did not finish

== See also ==
See also

- The Ocean Race Europe
- Ocean Globe Race, a retro race to celebrate the 50th anniversary of the first Whitbread Round the World Race.
