= Samantha Davies (sailor) =

English yachtswoman (born 1974)

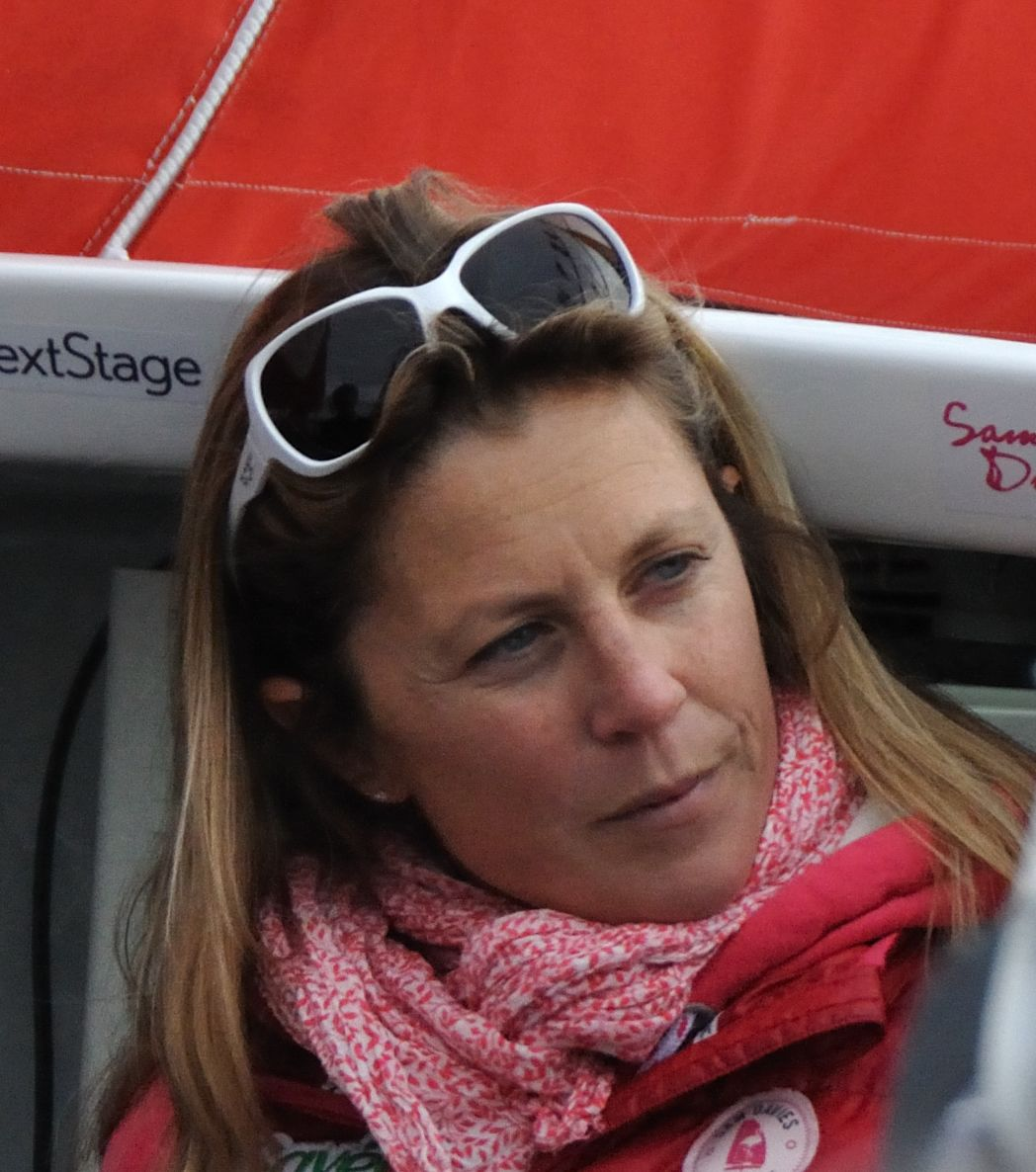
- Davies in 2012

Personal information
- Born: 23 August 1974 (age 51) Portsmouth, England

Sport
- Sport: Sailing
- Team: SCA

Samantha "Sam" Davies (born 23 August 1974 in Portsmouth) is an English yachtswoman.

== Personal life ==
Davies went to school at Portsmouth High School and received a degree in mechanical engineering from St John's College, Cambridge. She now lives in Kerlin (Trégunc), Brittany, France. She has a son, Ruben, whom she shares with her ex-partner, fellow offshore sailor Romain Attanasio.

== Biography ==
Samantha Davies came into the limelight with her 2008-2009 single-handed world circumnavigation in the Vendée Globe race, where she placed fourth. She was the third to cross the finish line, but owed a time allowance of 50 Hr to competitor Marc Guillemot, who crossed the line 48:40' after her. The time allowance was applied following both competitors' diversion to assist injured skipper Yann Eliès, but Marc Guillemot benefited from a larger handicap because of his forward position in the race. In 2009 she was awarded Yachtsman of the year by the yachting journalist association.

During the 2020-2021 Vendee Globe, she was forced to retire on day 26 with keel damage following collision with an unidentified floating object. She sailed to Cape Town where the damage was fully accessed and repaired and she continued outside the race and completed her circumnavigation in a time of 109d, 23h, 40m.

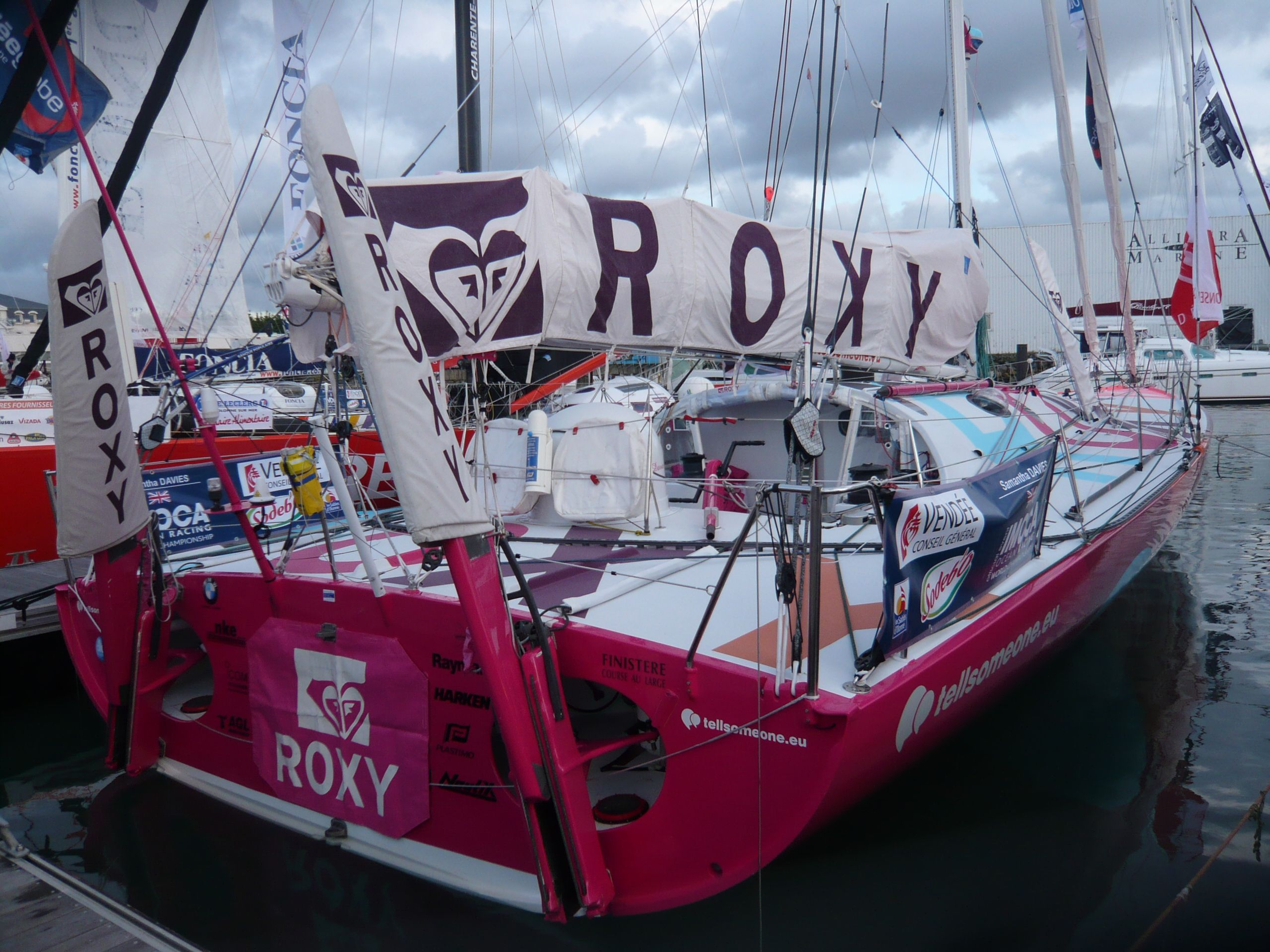
Roxy - 2008-2009 Vendée Globe

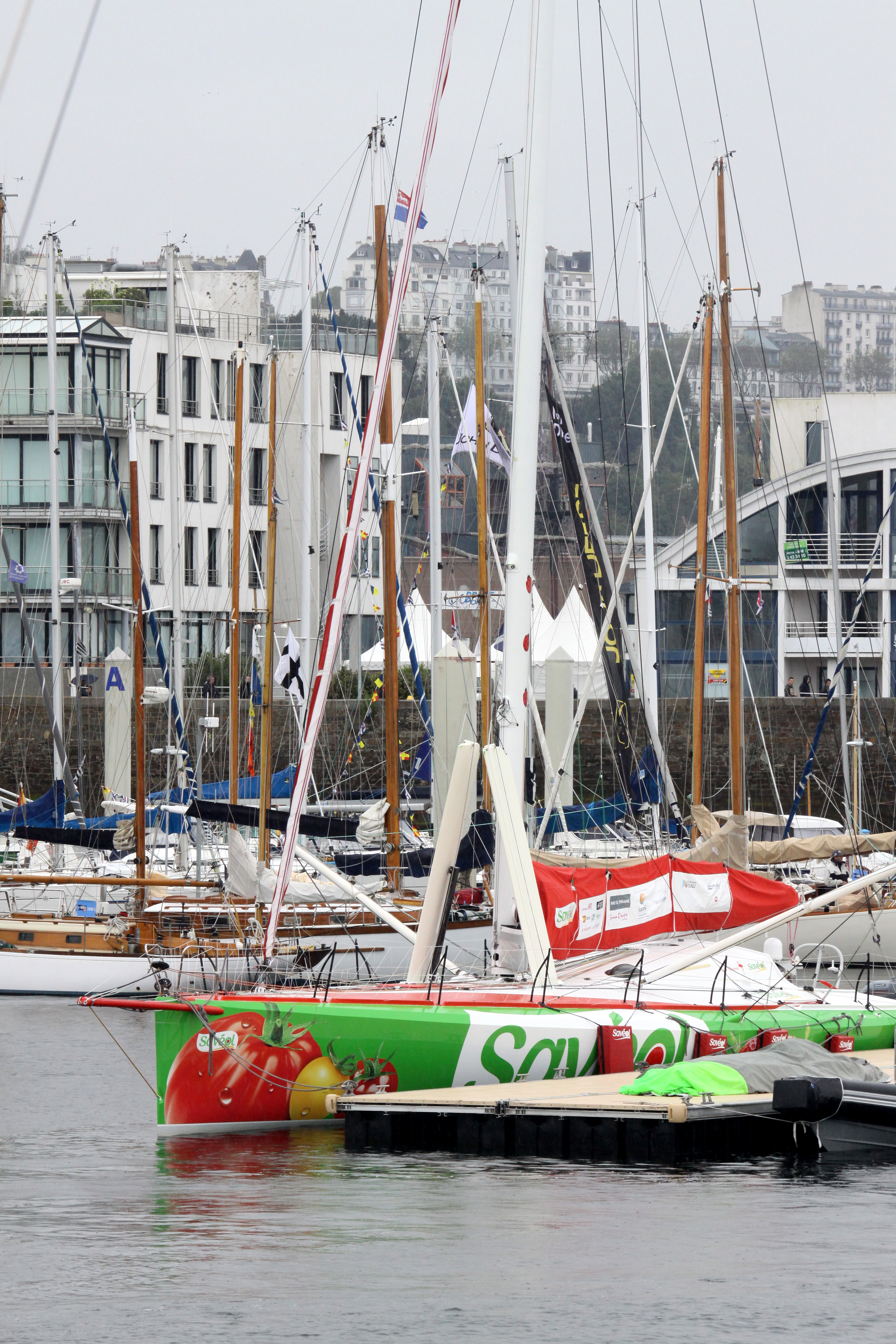
Savéol- 2012-2013 Vendée Globe

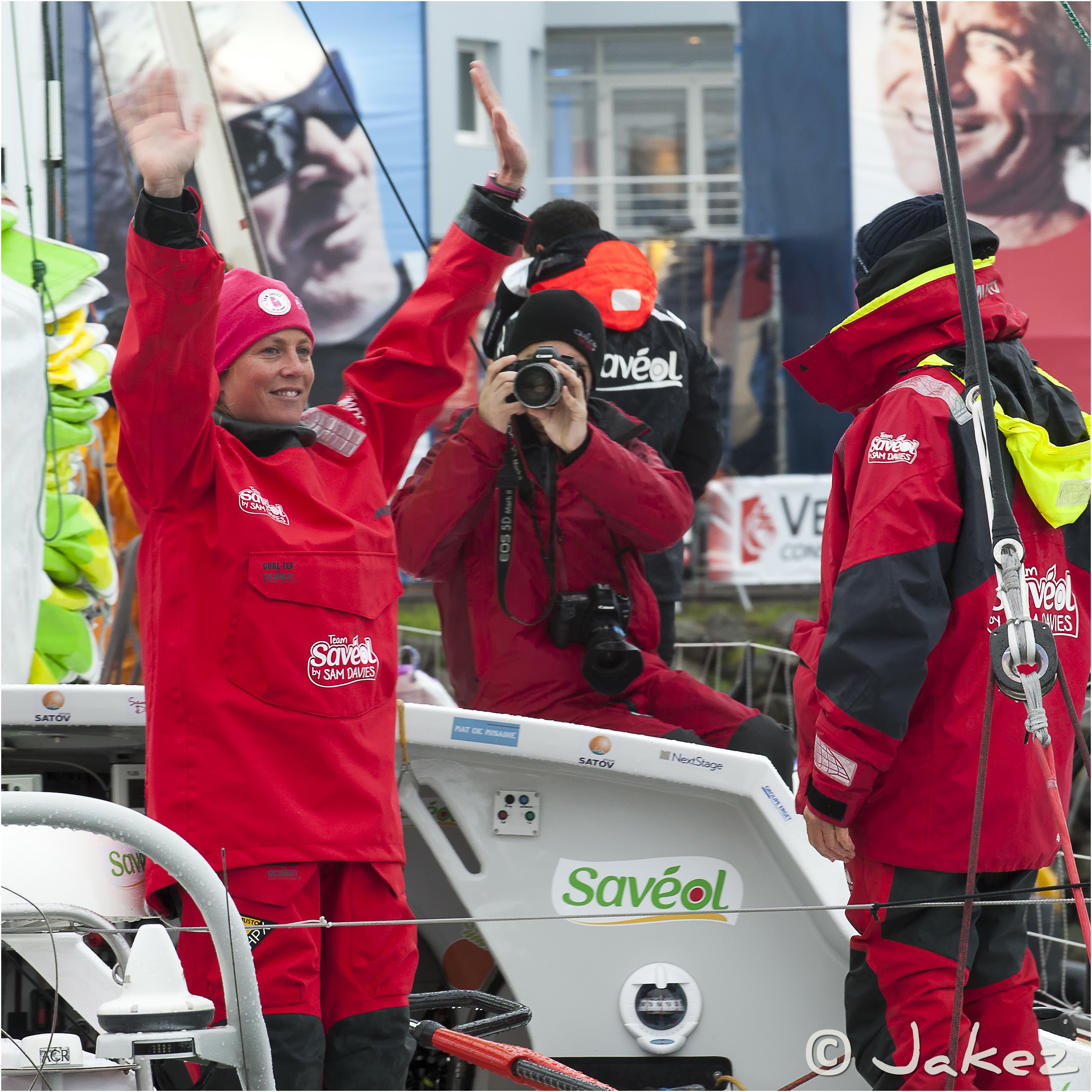
Savéol- 2012-2013 Vendée Globe

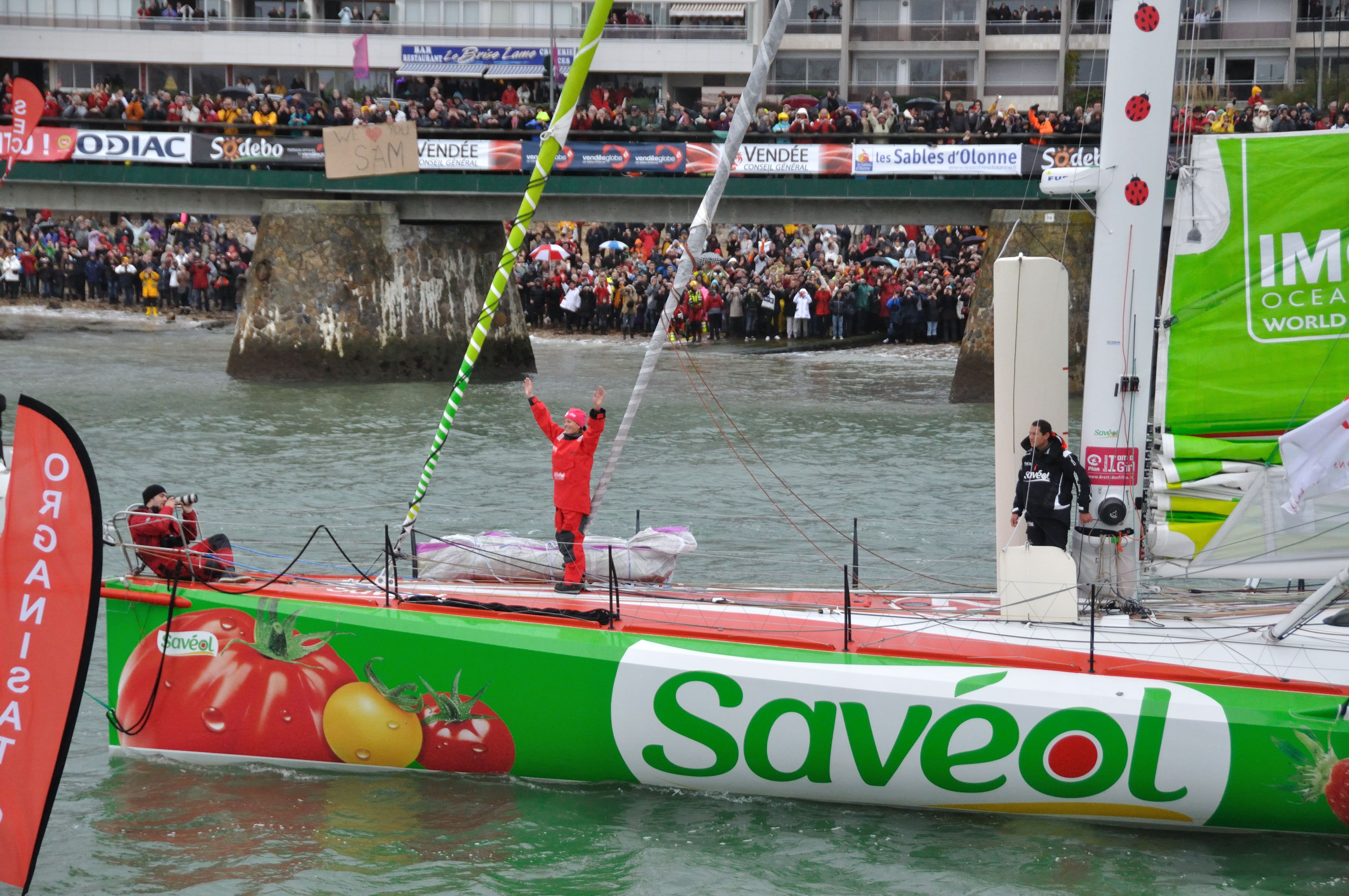
Savéol- 2012-2013 Vendée Globe

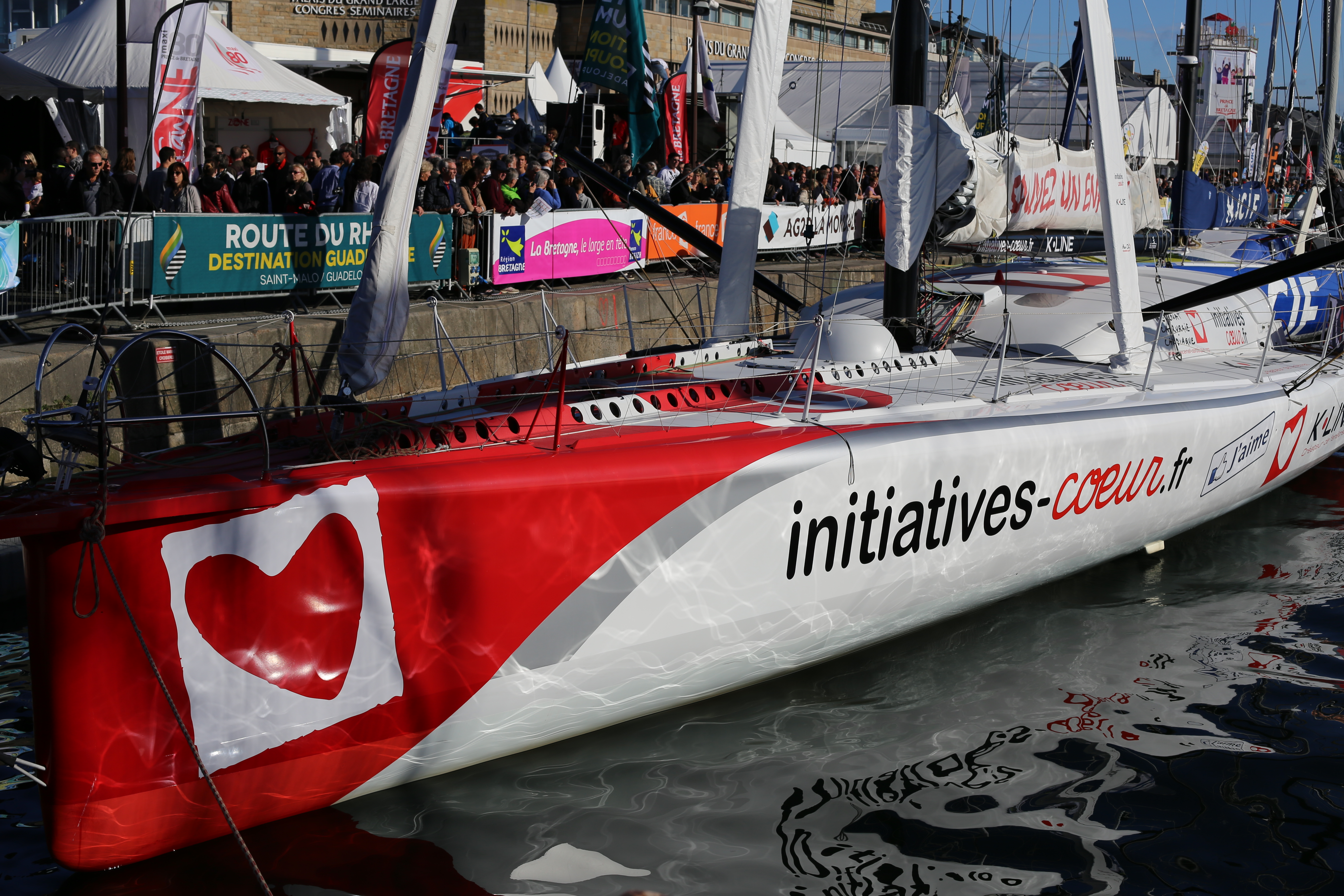
Initiatives-Cœur

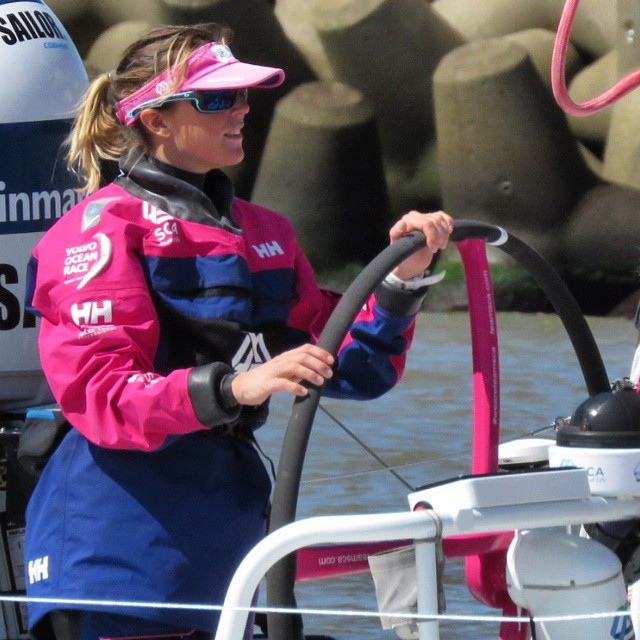
Volvo Ocean Race

== Record of achievement ==
Pos.	Year	Event	Class	Boat	Time	Notes	Ref.
Round the world races
13 / 40	2025	2024–2025 Vendée Globe	IMOCA 60	Initiatives-Cœur (4)	80d 22h 13m 39s		
DNF	2021	2020–2021 Vendée Globe	IMOCA 60	Initiatives-Cœur (3)	Collision with UFO but completed course		
6 / 7	2015	2014–2015 Volvo Ocean Race	Volvo Ocean 65	Team SCA		Skipper. Rotated Crew: Libby Greenhalgh (navigator) (GBR); Abby Ehler (GBR); Annie Lush (GBR); Carolijn Brouwer (NED); Elodie-Jane Mettraux (SUI); Justine Mettraux (SUI); Liz Wardley (PNG) (AUS); Sally Barkow (USA); Sophie Ciszek (AUS) (USA); Stacey Jackson (AUS); Dee Caffari (GBR); Sara Hastreiter (USA) Corinna Halloran (onboard reporter); Anna-Lena Elled (reserve onboard reporter); Richard Mason (shore manager)	
DNF	2013	2012–2013 Vendée Globe	IMOCA 60	Saveol	Dismasted Day 5		
4 / 30	2009	2008–2009 Vendée Globe	IMOCA 60	Roxy (2)	96d 12h 39m 01s		
Trans-Atlantic Races
6 / 28	2024	Transat New York Vendée	IMOCA 60	Initiatives-Cœur (4)	12d 10h 48min 29s		
3 / 33	2024	The Transat CIC	IMOCA 60	Initiatives-Cœur (4)	8d 12h 41m 37s		
6 / 32	2023	Retour à la base	IMOCA 60	Initiatives-Cœur (4)	10d 00h 36m 29s		
5 / 40	2023	Transat Jacques Vabre	IMOCA 60	Initiatives-Cœur (4)	12d 08h 43m 39s	with Jack Bouttell (AUS)	
5 /	2023	1000 Race	IMOCA 60	Initiatives-Cœur (4)			
28 / 38	2022	Route du Rhum	IMOCA 60	Initiatives-Cœur (4)	16d 06h 35m 17s		
5 / 22	2021	Transat Jacques Vabre	IMOCA 60	Initiatives-Cœur (3)	20d 17h 30m 10s	with Nicolas Lunven (FRA)	
7 / 29	2019	Transat Jacques Vabre	IMOCA 60	Initiatives-Cœur (3)	14d 09h 30m 44s	with Paul Meilhat (FRA)	
6 / 13	2017	Transat Jacques Vabre	IMOCA 60	Initiatives-Cœur (3)	15d 07h 40m 39s	with Tanguy De Lamotte (FRA)	
5 / 20	2015	Transat Jacques Vabre	IMOCA 60	Initiatives-Cœur (2)	18d 07h 09m 14s	with Tanguy De Lamotte (FRA)	
4 / 25	2010	Transat Ag2r	Beneteau Figaro 2	SAVEOL	22d 19h 44m 22s	with Romain Attanasio (FRA)	
10 / 14	2009	Transat Jacques Vabre	IMOCA 60	Artemis (2)		with Sidney Gavignet (FRA)	
5 / 13	2008	The Artemist Transat (OSTAR)	IMOCA 60	Roxy (2)	15d 10h 00m 51s		
10	2007	Transat Jacques Vabre	IMOCA 60	Roxy (2)		with Jeanne Grégoire (FRA)	
7 / 15	2007	Transat B to B	IMOCA 60	Roxy (2)	17d 17h 38m 46s		
12 / 28	2006	Transat Ag2r	Beneteau Figaro 2	ROXY	20d 06h 52m 45s	with Alexia Barrier (FRA)	
5 / 31	2004	Transat Ag2r	Beneteau Figaro 2	TROPHEE BPE SAINT-NAZAIRE - CUBA	20d 18h 40m 52s	with Jeanne Grégoire (FRA)	
6 / 17	2003	Transat Jacques Vabre	IMOCA 60	Team Cowes	18d 19h 57m 35s	with Nick Moloney (AUS)	
11	2003	Mini Transat Race	Mini Transat 6.50	No. 276 - Aberdeen Asset Management			
Other Races
5 / 18	2024	Défi Azimut-Lorient Agglomération	IMOCA 60	Initiatives-Cœur (4)	1d 20h 25m 41s		
5 / 34	2023	Défi Azimut-Lorient Agglomération	IMOCA 60	Initiatives-Cœur (4)	2d 01h 44m 46s	with Jack Bouttell (AUS)	
5 / 25	2023	Rolex Fastnet Race	IMOCA 60	Initiatives-Cœur (4)	2d 08h 01m 00s	with Anne Beaugé (FRA)	
7 /	2022	Défi Azimut-Lorient Agglomération	IMOCA 60	Initiatives-Cœur (4)			
6 /	2021	Défi Azimut-Lorient Agglomération	IMOCA 60	Initiatives-Cœur (3)			
5 / 13	2021	Rolex Fastnet Race	IMOCA 60	Initiatives-Cœur (3)	2d 23h 17m 43s	with Nicolas Lunven (FRA)	
2 /	2020	Défi Azimut-Lorient Agglomération	IMOCA 60	Initiatives-Cœur (3)			
4 / 20	2020	Vendée Arctique - Les Sables d'Olonne	IMOCA 60	Initiatives-Cœur (3)	10d 06h 58m 55s		
5 / 20	2019	Rolex Fastnet Race	IMOCA 60	Initiatives-Cœur	2d 02h 26m 49s	with	
4 / 9	2017	Rolex Fastnet Race	IMOCA 60	Initiatives-Cœur	2d 18h 14m 48s	with Tanguy De Lamotte (FRA)	
5 / 9	2015	Rolex Fastnet Race	IMOCA 60	Initiatives-Cœur	3d 02h 33m 42s	with Tanguy De Lamotte (FRA)	
22	2005	Solitaire du Figaro	Beneteau Figaro 2	Skandia			
19	2004	Solitaire du Figaro	Beneteau Figaro 2	Skandia			
19	2003	Solitaire du Figaro	Beneteau Figaro 2				
14	2001	Yngling World Championship	Yngling (keelboat)			Helm - Shirley Robertson (GBR); Bow - Craig Mitchell (GBR)	
	1999	Mumm 30 World Championship	Farr 30				
	1995	Mumm 36 World Championship	Mumm 36				
	1990s	Ultra 30	Ultra 30	Hoya			
Record Attempts
	2014	Female Round Britain and Ireland World Record	Volvo Ocean 65	SCA	4d 21h 39s	+ Crew	
	2009	Female Round Britain and Ireland World Record	IMOCA 60	Aviva	6d 11h 30s with	Dee Caffari (GBR); Miranda Merron (GBR); Alex Sizer (GBR)	
DNF	1998	Round the World Record / Jules Verne Trophy Attempt	Maxi Cat.	Royal Sun Alliance	Skippered by Tracy Edwards (GBR)		
