= Volvo Ocean 65 Mapfre =

MAPFRE
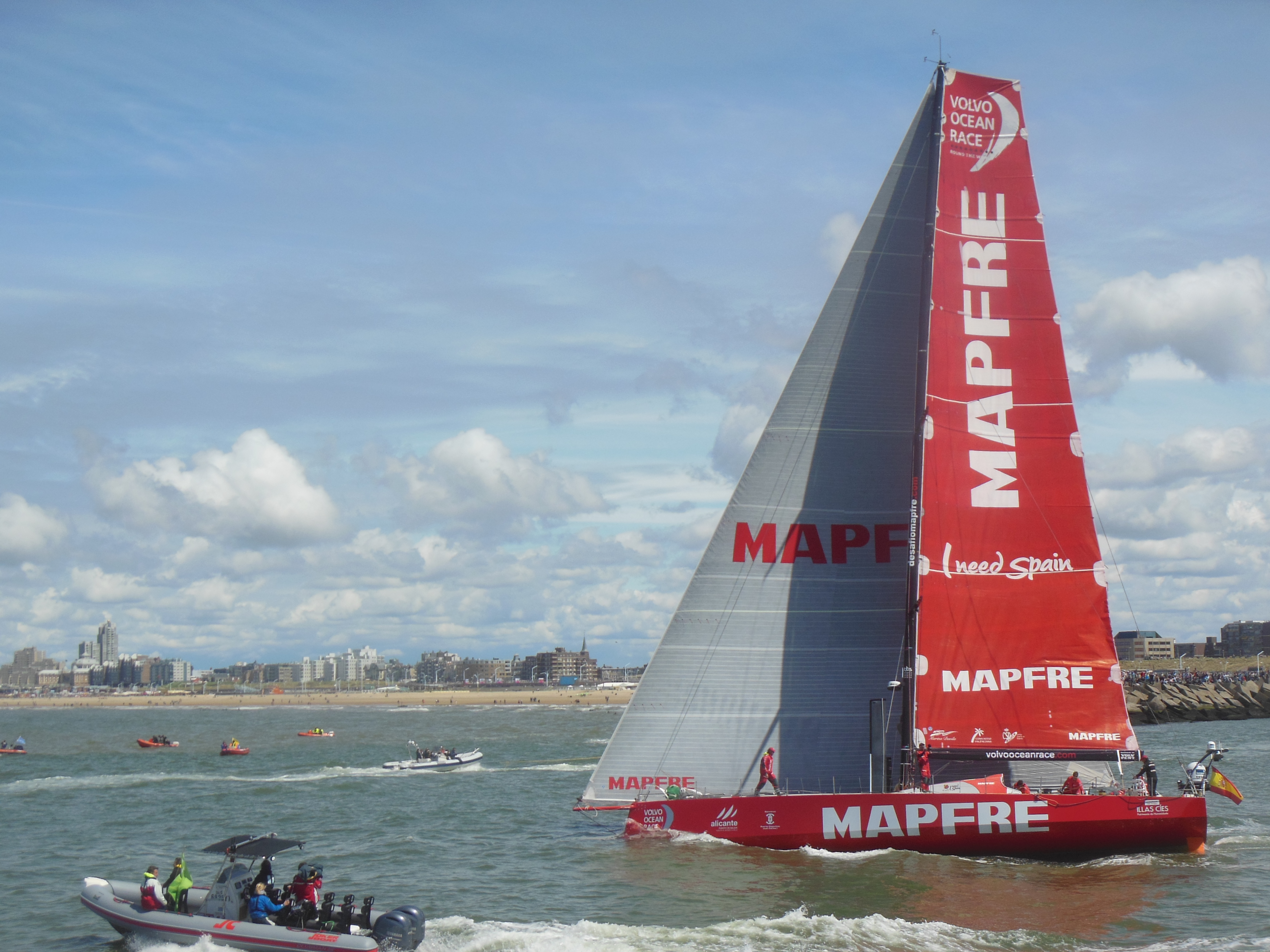
- Mapfre in 2015.
- Nation: Spain
- Class: Volvo Ocean 65
- Designer(s): Farr Yacht Design

Racing career
- Skippers: Iker Martínez (2014-2015), Xabi Fernández (Co-skipper 2014-15, skipper 2017-2018)

MAPFRE is a Volvo Ocean 65 yacht. She finished fourth in the 2014–15 Volvo Ocean Race skippered by Iker Martínez and by Xabi Fernández in the 2017–18 Volvo Ocean Race.

The chief executive officer of the team is Pedro Campos Calvo-Sotelo and Neal McDonald is the Sports and Performance Director.

== 2017-2018 Volvo Ocean Race ==
Crew
Position	Sailor
Captain	Xabi Fernández
Navigator	Joan Vila
Watch captain	Pablo Arrarte
Trimmer/helmsman	Blair Tuke
	Robert Greenhalgh
	Antonio "Ñeti" Cuervas-Mons
	Willy Altadill
	Sophie Ciszek
	Támara Echegoyen
	Louis Sinclair

== 2014-15 crew ==
- Iker Martínez, skipper
- Xabi Fernández, watch captain, stand-in skipper legs 3, 4, 8
- Jean-Luc Nélias, navigator
- André Fonseca “Bochecha”, watch captain
- Antonio Cuervas-Mons, bowman
- Rob Greenhalgh, watch captain
- Carlos Hernández, trimmer/helmsman
- "Rafa" Rafael Trujillo Villar, trimmer/helmsman
- Willy Altadill, trimmer
- "Willy" Guillermo Altadill Fisher, trimmer
- Francisco Vignale, onboard reporter
- Anthony Marchand, trimmer/helmsman
- Sam Goodchild, trimmer/helmsman
- Nico Lunven, navigator, leg 1
- Michel Desjoyeaux, watch captain, leg 1
