= Liz Wardley =

Papua New Guinean and Australian sailor

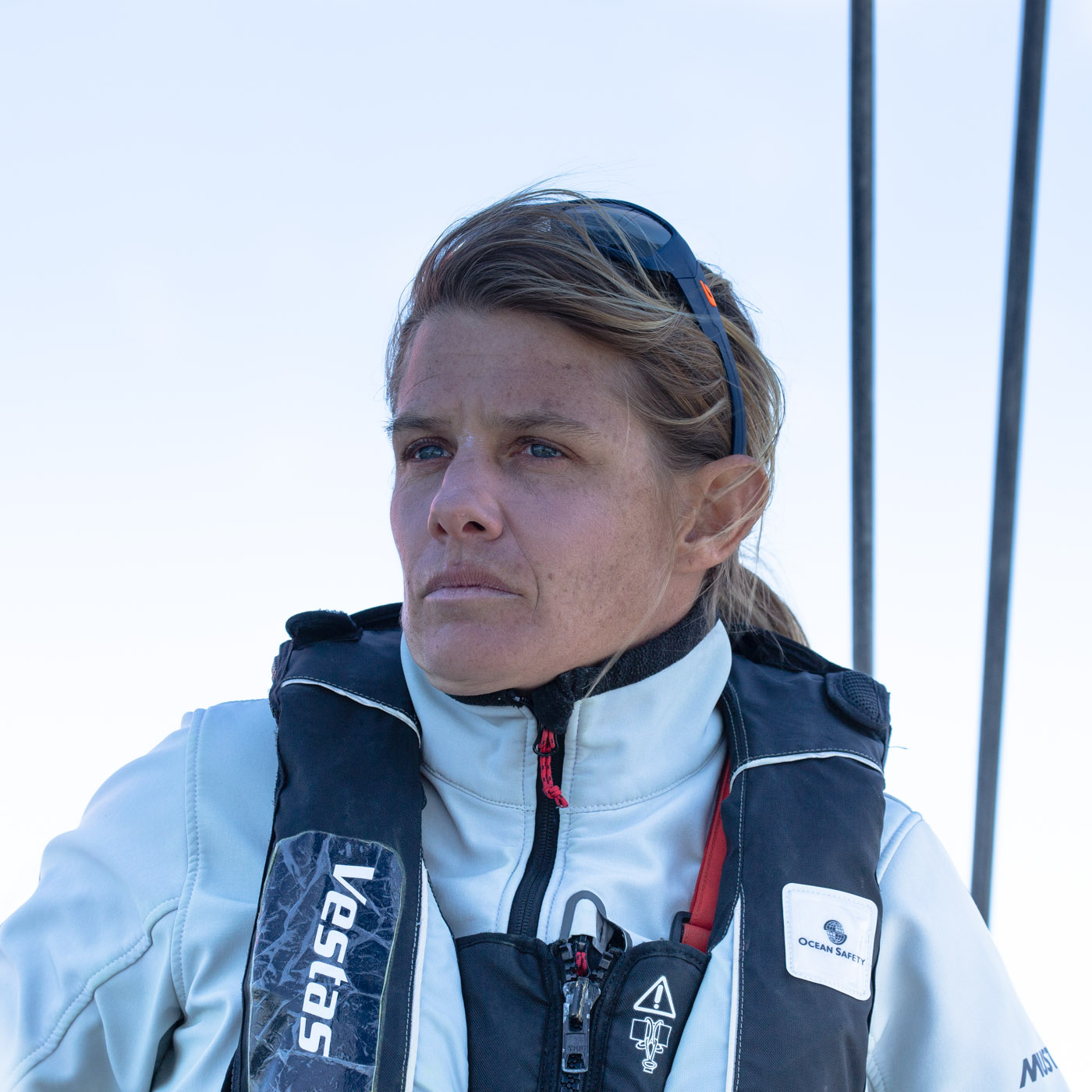
- Liz Wardley in June 2016

Personal information
- Nationality: Papua New Guinea; Australia
- Born: 6 December 1979 (age 46) Kokopo, Papua New Guinea

Sailing career
- Sport: Sailing
Medal record
Hobie 16 World Championship
Representing Papua New Guinea
Bronze medal – third place	1997 Sotogrande	Event
Representing Australia
Silver medal – second place	1998 Airlie Beach	Event
- Updated on 2023-07-18

Liz Wardley (born 6 December 1979) is a Papua New Guinean and Australian sailor. She has competed under both nationalities. Wardley started by racing in the Hobie 16 class and is now known as an experienced crew sailor, having taken part in 4 editions of The Ocean Race.

== Biography ==
Wardley started her sailing career by racing in the Hobie 16 category, winning a bronze medal at the 1997 World Championship in Sotogrande and a silver medal at the 1998 World Championship in Airlie Beach.

In 1998 she became the youngest female skipper to take part in the 1998 Sydney to Hobart Yacht Race onboard Dixie Chicken. In 1999 she won the race in the PHS Div 2 class onboard Phillip's Foote

Wardley competed in 4 editions of the Volvo Ocean Race. In 2001-2002 she was part of the all-female crew of Amer Sports Too. In 2014-2015 she was again part of an all-female crew onboard Team SCA. In 2017-2018 she was part of the Turn the Tide on Plastic crew. In 2023 she won as part of the VO65 crew of WindWhisper Racing Team.

In 2009 she won the Fastnet Race onboard the Class40 Initiatives Saveurs – Novedia Group with skipper Tanguy de Lamotte.

In 2024 she won the women's solo division of the World's Toughest Row, taking fifteen days off the previous record.

== Personal life ==
She lives in La Forêt-Fouesnant in Finistère, France, and has also lived in Sydney, Australia.

== Honours ==
She was named the Papua New Guinean Sportswomen of the Year in 1999 and 2000.

- 1998 : 2nd in the Hobie Cat World Championships
- 1999 : 1st in the Australian National Championships – 1st in the Sydney-Hobart PHS Div 2, on Elliot 36 ft Phillip’s Foote
- 2001-2002 : Amer Sports Too Volvo Ocean Race
- 2002 : 2nd in the Overhand Open
- 2004 : 50th in the Solitaire du Figaro – 24th in the Generali Solo
- 2005 : 25th in the Solitaire du Figaro
- 2006 : 24th in the Solitaire du Figaro – 20th in the Transat AG2R – 17th in the Solitaire de la Méditerranée
- 2007 : 4th in the BPE Trophy 8th French long course Championships
