= Iker Martínez de Lizarduy =

Spanish sailor

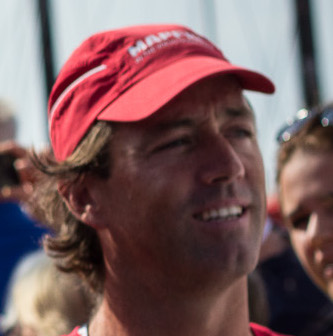

Personal information
- Full name: Iker Martínez de Lizarduy Lizarribar
- Born: 16 June 1977 (age 49) San Sebastián, Spain

Sport

Sailing career
- Class: 49er
Medal record
Representing Spain
Sailing
Olympic Games
Gold medal – first place	2004 Athens	49er
Silver medal – second place	2008 Beijing	49er
49er World Championships
Gold medal – first place	2002 Kāneʻohe	49er
Gold medal – first place	2004 Athens	49er
Gold medal – first place	2010 Port Lucaya	49er
Silver medal – second place	2001 Malcesine	49er

Iker Martínez de Lizarduy Lizarribar (born 16 June 1977) is a Basque Spanish sailor and olympic champion. Martínez de Lizarduy won a gold medal in the 49er class with Xabier Fernández at the 2004 Summer Olympics in Athens. The same pairing won the silver medal at the 2008 Summer Olympics.

Iker Martínez was skipper for Team Telefónica in the 2011-2012 edition of the Volvo Ocean Race, with Fernandez also being a team member. They were also named ISAF Rolex World Sailors of the Year 2011, finding out while they were competing in the first leg of the Volvo Ocean Race.

He also skippered Spanish yacht MAPFRE in the 2014–2015 edition of the Volvo Ocean Race, albeit he skipped a few legs to prepare himself for the 2016 Rio Olympics.

He won his 1st Medal in the 49er World Championships

== Main achievements ==
2001

- World Championship Malcesine (Italy), 2nd position;
- European Championship Brest (France), 2nd position;

2002

- World Championship Kāneʻohe (United States of America), 1st position;
- European Championship Grimstad (Norway), 1st position;

2003

- European Championship Laredo (Spain), 3rd position;

2004

- Olympic Games Athens (Greece), 1st position;
- World Championship Athens (Greece), 1st position;

2006

- European Championship Weymouth (United kingdom), 3rd position;

2007

- European Championship Marsala (Italy), 1st position;

2008

- European Championship S'Arena (Spain), 1st position;
- Olympic Games Beijing (China), 2nd position;

2009

- Volvo Ocean Race (RTW), 3rd position;

2010

- Barcelona World Race (RTW), 2nd position (with Xabi Fernandez);
