= Volvo Ocean 65 Ambersail II =

Ambersail II
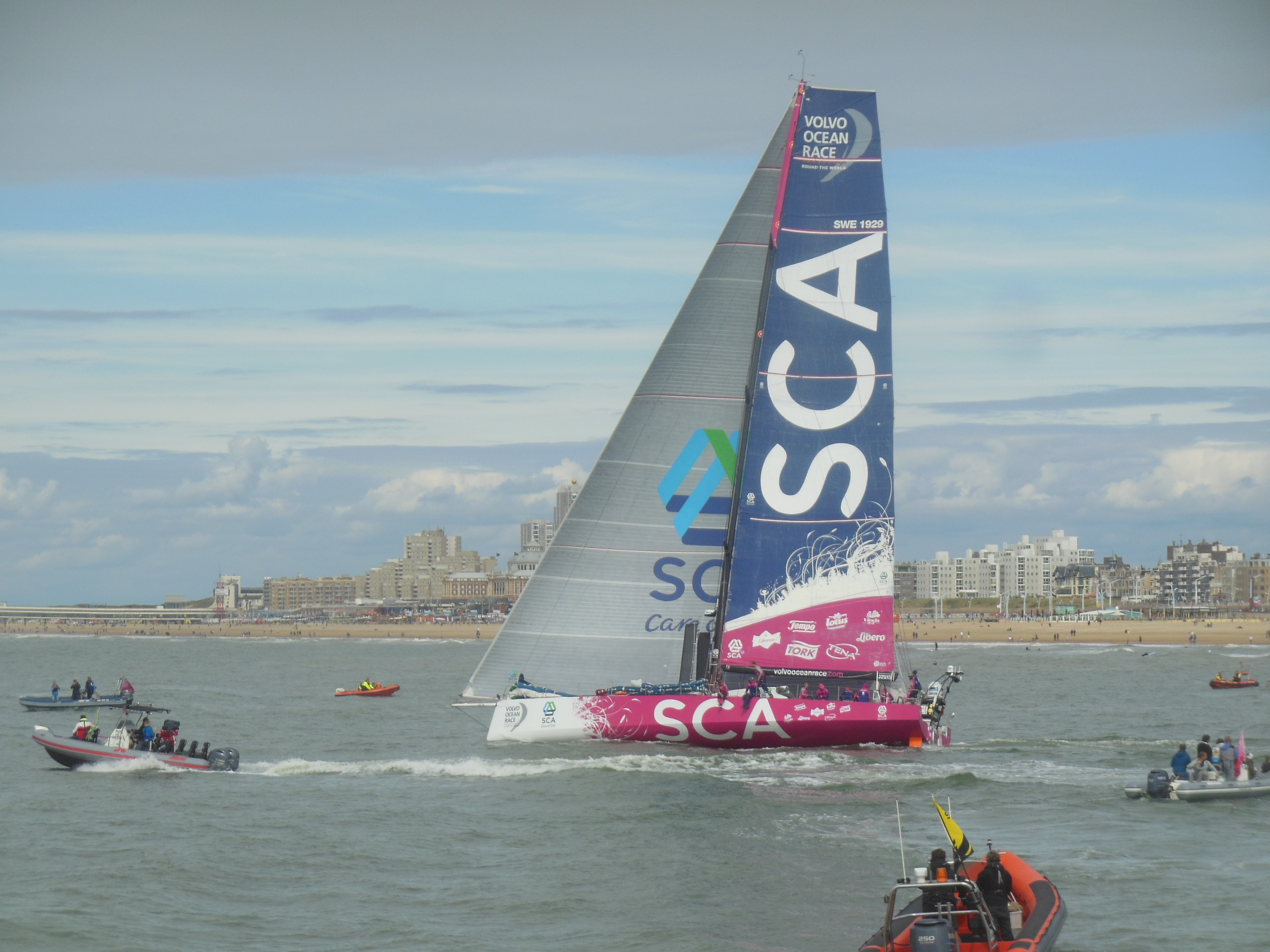
- Team SCA in 2015.
- Nation: Lithuania
- Class: Volvo Ocean 65
- Designer(s): Farr Yacht Design

Racing career
- Skippers: Samantha Davies (2014-15); Rokas Milevičius (2023)
- Notable victories: 2014-15 Volvo Ocean Race: Leg 8

Team SCA is a Volvo Ocean 65 yacht. She finished sixth in the 2014–15 Volvo Ocean Race skippered by Samantha Davies.

Following the race, the boat was refitted for the 2017–18 Volvo Ocean Race but did not compete.

The boat was renamed Ambersail II for the 2023 The Ocean Race.

== 2014-2015 Volvo Ocean Race ==
Team SCA rotated members for each leg of the race.

=== Crew ===
- Samantha Davies (skipper)
- Libby Greenhalgh (navigator)
- Abby Ehler
- Anna-Lena Elled (reserve onboard reporter)
- Annie Lush
- Carolijn Brouwer
- Elodie-Jane Mettraux
- Justine Mettraux (under 30)
- Liz Wardley
- Sally Barkow
- Sophie Ciszek (under 30)
- Stacey Jackson
- Corinna Halloran (onboard reporter)
- Dee Caffari
- Sara Hastreiter
- Richard Mason (shore manager)

Libby Greenhalgh won the B&G navigator prize, for best use of navigation equipment. This award is voted on by the other navigators in the race. The team finished third on the In-Port Series, winning leg 3 in Abu Dhabi and 5 in Auckland.

=== Results ===
Team SCA finished sixth in the overall standings and third in the in-port series.

Overall standings

	Leg 1 (Spain) (South Africa)	Leg 2 (South Africa) (United Arab Emirates)	Leg 3 (United Arab Emirates) (China)	Leg 4 (China) (New Zealand)	Leg 5 (New Zealand) (Brazil)	Leg 6 (Brazil) (United States)	Leg 7 (United States) (Portugal)	Leg 8 (Portugal) (France)	Leg 9 (France) (Sweden)	Penalty/ Redress	Total
Team SCA	6	6	6	6	5	6	6	1	7	2	51

In-port series

	Ali (Spain)	CT (South Africa)	AD (United Arab Emirates)	San (China)	Auc (New Zealand)	Ita (Brazil)	NP (United States)	Lis (Portugal)	Lor (France)	Got (Sweden)	Total
Team SCA	6	3	1	5	1	4	4	4	5	2	35

== 2023 The Ocean Race ==
=== Crew ===
The crew consisted of:

- (Lithuania) Rokas Milevičius (skipper)
- (Lithuania) Saulius Pajarskas (crew member)
- (Poland) Wiktor Kobryń (crew member)
- (Lithuania) Deimantė Jarmalavičiūtė (crew member)
- (Ukraine) Anastasia Kolesnichenko (crew member)
- (Lithuania) Martin Volkovicki (crew member)
- (Lithuania) Jonas Drąsutavičius (crew member)
- (Lithuania) Domantas Juškevičius (crew member)
- (Ukraine) Sofiia Naumenko (crew member)
- (Lithuania) Martynas Karpavičius (crew member)
- (Lithuania) Sigitas Babilius (onboard reporter)
