= Rokas Milevičius =

Lithuanian sailor (born 1986)

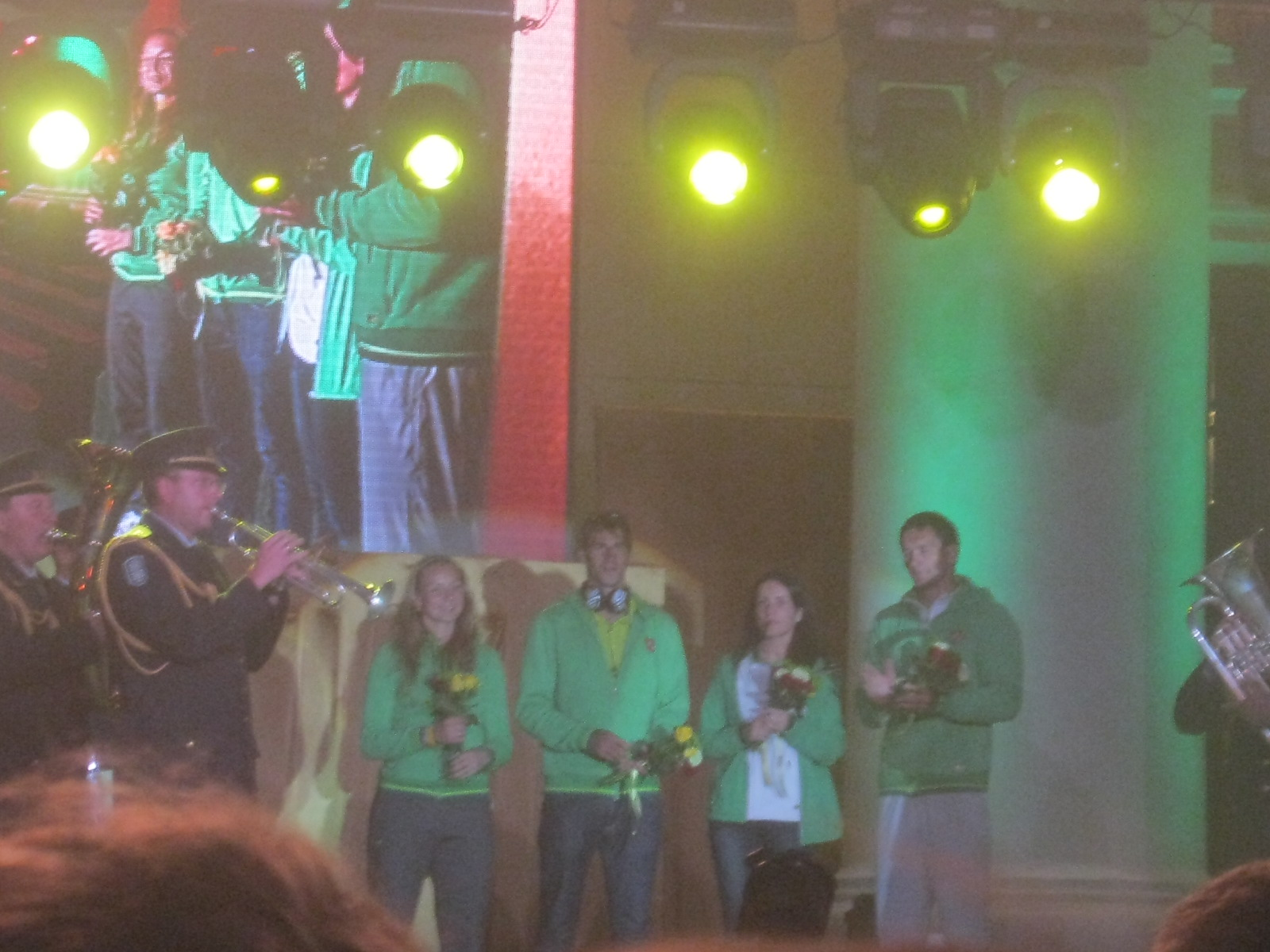
- Milevičius (in green; middle-left) in 2021

Personal information
- Nationality: Lithuania
- Born: 10 December 1986 (age 39) Kaunas, Lithuanian SSR, Soviet Union

Sailing career
- Sport: Sailing

Rokas Milevičius (born 10 December 1986 in Kaunas) is a yacht sailor from Lithuania.

== Biography ==
Studied in Lithuanian Academy of Physical Education.

In 2014 Milevičius joined Dutch sailing team Brunel for the 2014–15 Volvo Ocean Race. In 2023 Milevičius led team Ambersail II at the 2023 The Ocean Race.

=== Achievements ===
- 2010 European championships – 88th;
- 2012 World championships – 42nd;
- 2012 Summer Olympics, Laser Class - 42nd
