= Volvo Ocean 65 Vestas 11th Hour Racing =

Vestas 11th Hour Racing
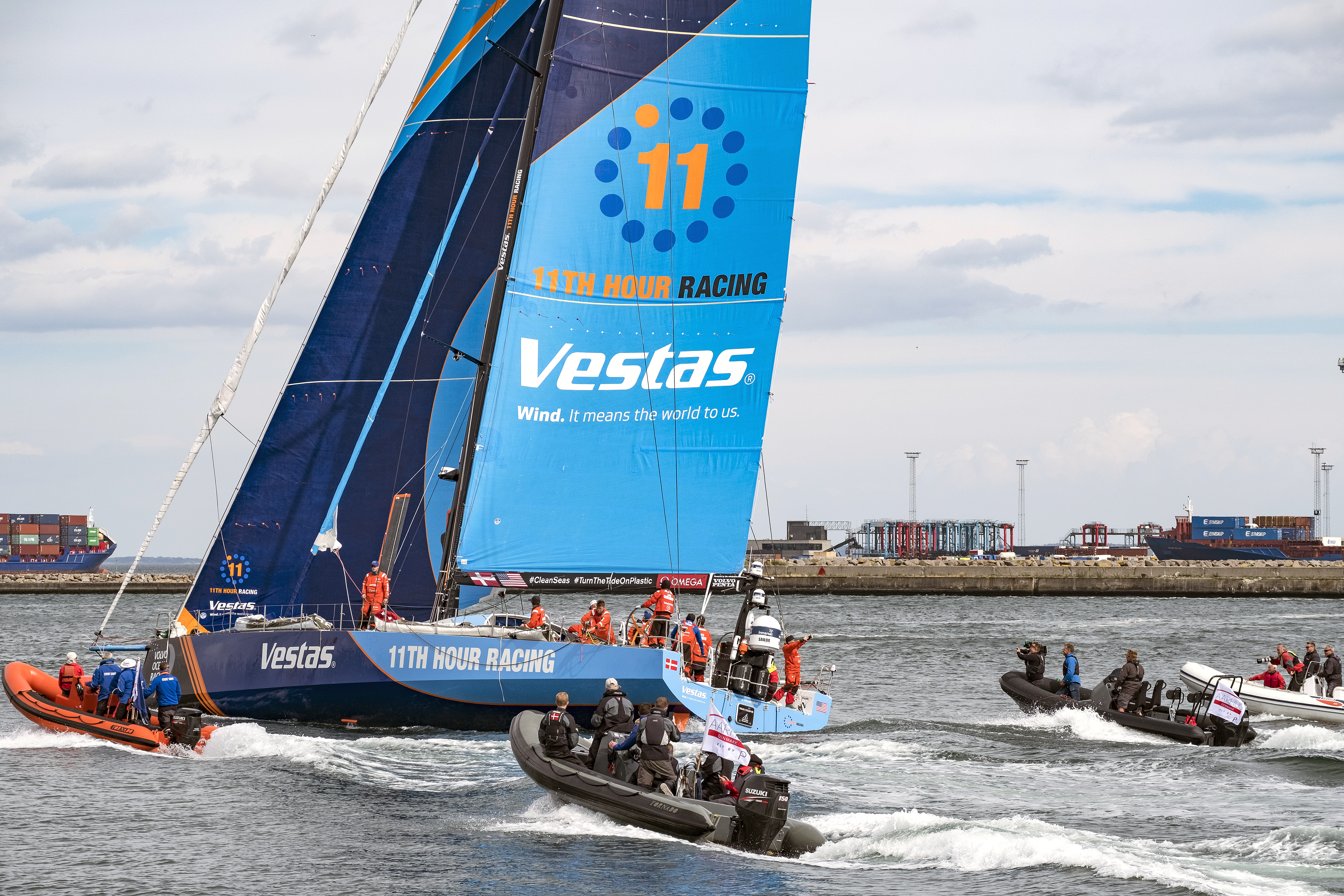
- Vestas 11th Hour Racing in June 2018
- Class: Volvo Ocean 65

Racing career
- Skippers: Charlie Enright

Specifications
- Length: 65 feet

Vestas 11th Hour Racing was a Volvo Ocean 65 class yacht team competing in the 2017–2018 Volvo Ocean Race. It was named after 11th Hour Racing, a program of The Schmidt Family Foundation and its then title sponsors: a wind turbine manufacturer Vestas Wind Systems A/S. After the COVID-19 pandemic disruption the team changed yacht class to IMOCA 60 and no longer had Vestas as a sponsor. It now competes in the 2023 The Ocean Race as 11th Hour Racing.

The team finished fifth in the 2017–18 Volvo Ocean Race and in the 2014–15 Volvo Ocean Race, when she was known as Team Alvimedica and skippered by Charlie Enright.

Between the two races, Vestas 11th Hour Racing was extensively refitted along with the other Volvo Ocean 65's.

== 2017-2018 Volvo Ocean Race ==
- Charlie Enright (skipper)
- Simon Fisher
- Mark Towill (Team director)
- Damian Foxall
- Nick Dana
- Tom Johnson
- Tony Mutter
- Stacey Jackson
- Hannah Diamond
- Roberto Bermúdez de Castro Muñoz
- Jena Hansen

== 2014-2015 Volvo Ocean Race ==
- Charlie Enright (skipper & team co-founder)
- Mark Towill (team co-founder)
- Will Oxley (Navigator)
- Alberto Bolzan
- Nick Dana
- Ryan Houston
- Dave Swete
- Amory Ross (On-Board Reporter)
- Sébastien Marsset / Stu Bannatyne
