= Volvo Ocean 65 Team AkzoNobel =

Yacht built for the 2017-18 Volvo Ocean Race

Team AkzoNobel
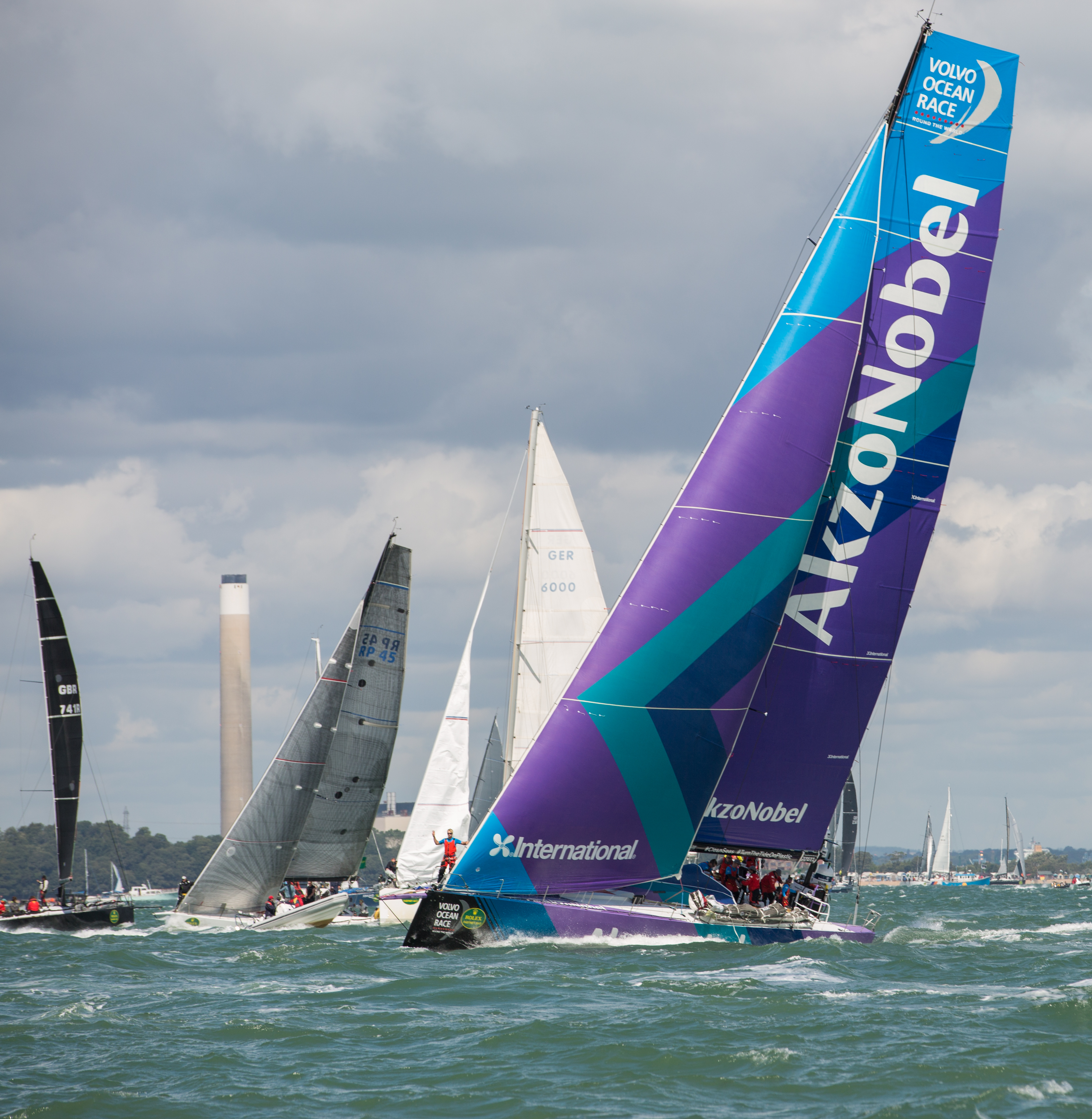
- Team AkzoNobel at the Fastnet weekend 2017
- Nation: Netherlands
- Class: Volvo Ocean 65

Racing career
- Skippers: Simeon Tienpont

team AkzoNobel is a Volvo Ocean 65 yacht. She was the only new yacht built for the 2017–18 Volvo Ocean Race.

== 2017-18 Volvo Ocean Race ==
=== Team ===
- Simeon Tienpont - skipper
- Jules Salter - navigator
- Chris Nicholson
- Peter van Niekerk
- Brad Farrand
- António Fontes (loaned from Team Sun Hung Kai/Scallywag)
- Martine Grael
- Luke Molloy
- Ross Monson
- Emily Nagel
- Nicolai Sehested
- Álex Pella
- Justin Ferris

=== Leadership dispute ===
On October 13, the day before the first scoring race, it was announced that, due to a breach of contract by his company, STEAM Racing, Tienpont's contract as skipper was terminated by Team AkzoNobel. Watch captain Brad Jackson was promoted to skipper in the place of Tienpont. Two hours before the start of leg 1, Tienpont was re-instated by an arbitration panel. As a result, Jackson, Jules Salter, Joca Signorini and Rome Kirby opted not to sail in leg 1 of the race.

== 2021 The Ocean Race Europe ==
=== Team ===
- Chris Nicholson - Skipper
- Lucas Chapman - Watch leader
- Trystan - Seal Bowman
- Rosalin Kuiper - Sail trimmer / Onboard Reporter
- Rory Hunter - Trimmer / helmsman
- Charlie Wyatt - Trimmer / helmsman
- Giulio Bertelli - Trimmer / helmsman
- Liz Wardley - Boat captain
- Will Harris - Navigator
