= 2017–2018 Volvo Ocean Race =

Around-the-world yacht race

2017–18 Volvo Ocean Race
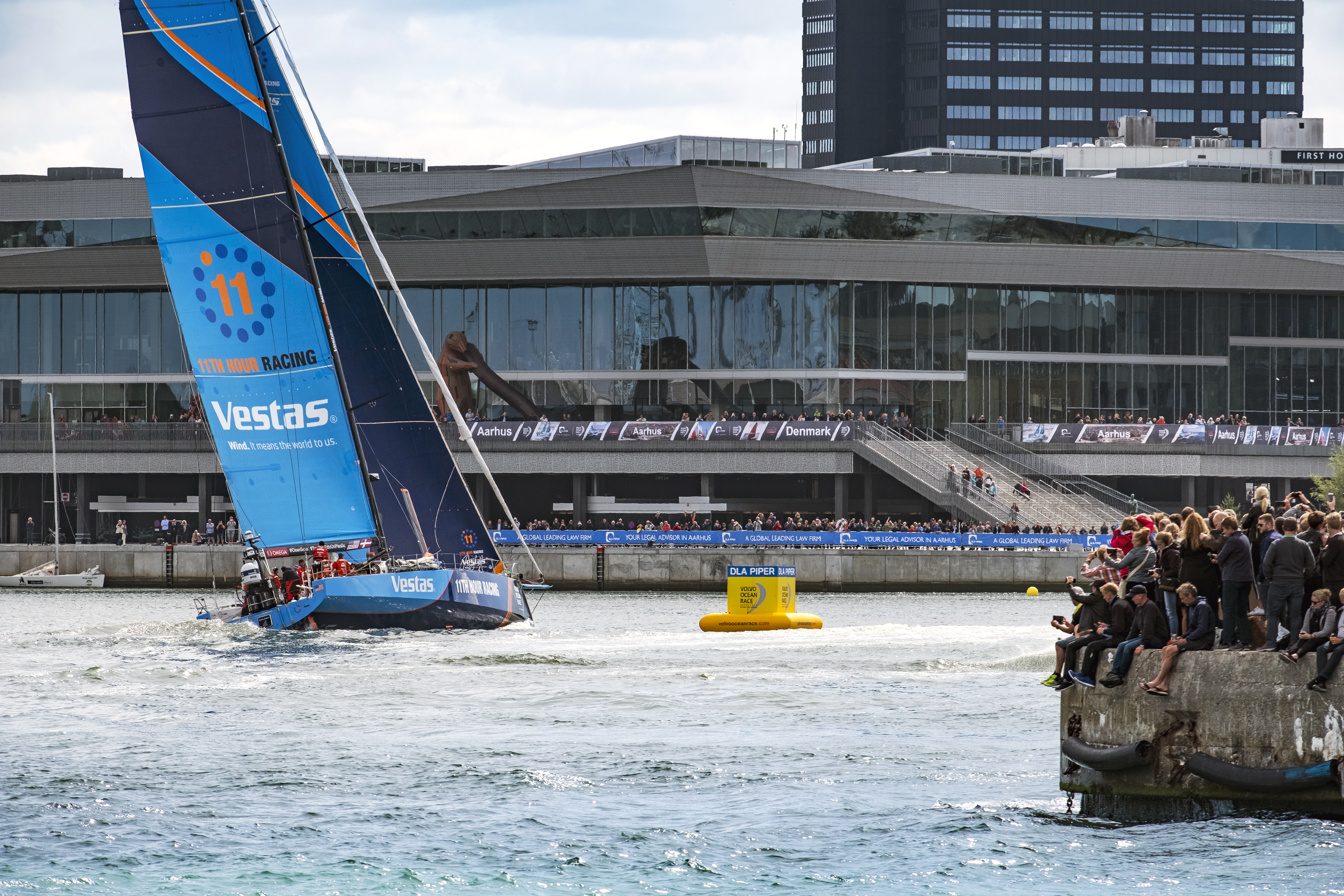

Event title
- Edition: 13th
- Dates: 14 October 2017 – 30 June 2018
- Yachts: Volvo Ocean 65

Competitors
- Competitors: 7

Results
- Winner: (China) Dongfeng Race Team

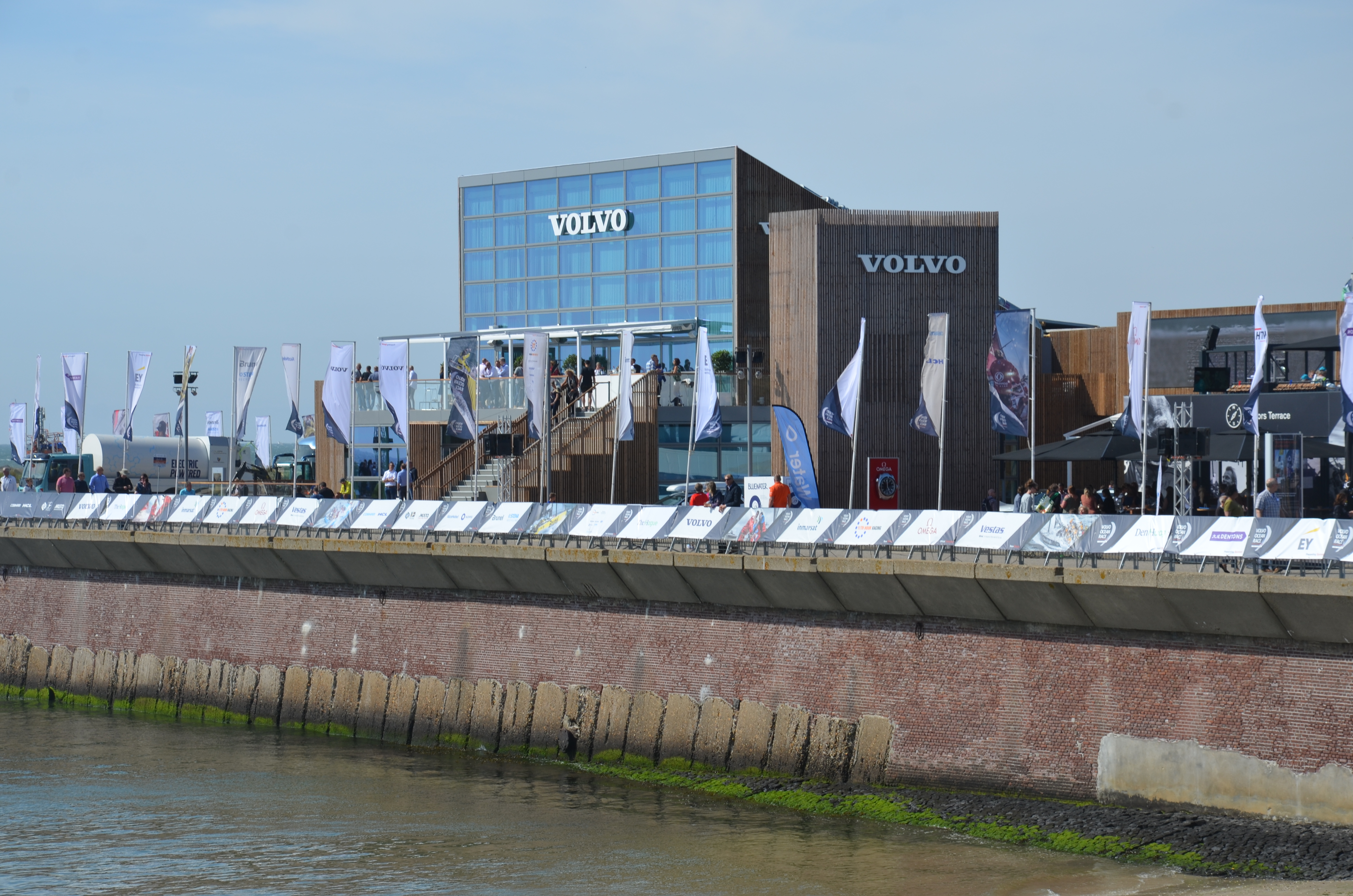
Volvo Ocean Race finish Scheveningen The Hague

The 2017–18 Volvo Ocean Race was the 13th edition of the round-the-world Volvo Ocean Race. It started in Alicante, Spain, and concluded in The Hague, Netherlands. GAC Pindar provides logistic support for the race. At the stopovers, teams had premium bases for better fan interaction.

Volvo made a number of changes to this edition. Sailors were able to provide social media updates, new male/female ratios were introduced, Onboard Reporters rotated between teams, a new scoring system was used, the yachts were upgraded with Hydro generators for back-up power and all teams sailed the 2017 Fastnet Race.

During Leg 7 of the race, John Fisher, 47, a British citizen who lived in Adelaide, was swept overboard from Sun Hung Kai/Scallywag and lost at sea 1400 miles west of Cape Horn.

== Yachts ==
For the second edition running, the race was one-design, racing the Volvo Ocean 65. The VO65 was designed by Farr Yacht Design to be a cheaper and safer alternative to the ageing and expensive Volvo Open 70.

All Volvo 65's have undergone repairs and refits by The Boatyard. This ensured that all the yachts are the same. The estimated cost of the refit was 1 million euros per boat.

== Participants ==
Despite an eighth boat being produced for this edition, only seven teams participated, as in the previous edition:

Team	Skipper
(Netherlands) Team AkzoNobel	(Netherlands) Simeon Tienpont^{1}
(China) Dongfeng Race Team	(France) Charles Caudrelier
(Spain) MAPFRE	(Spain) Xabi Fernández
(Denmark) (United States) Vestas 11th Hour Racing	(United States) Charlie Enright
(Hong Kong) Team Sun Hung Kai/Scallywag	(Australia) David Witt
(United Nations) Turn the Tide on Plastic	(United Kingdom) Dee Caffari
(Netherlands) Team Brunel	(Netherlands) Bouwe Bekking

- ^1 — Skipper Simeon Tienpont was released from Team AkzoNobel on 13 October, one day before the first in-port race, and replaced by Brad Jackson. Two hours before the start of leg 1, Tienpont was re-instated by an arbitration panel.

== Route ==
The full route for this edition was announced in June 2016, with the announcement of the addition of Melbourne in January 2017.

This edition of the race included "Leg 0", a set of 4 offshore races to help generate interest. They included the 2017 Round the Island Race, and the 2017 Fastnet Race.

Event	Start date	Finish date	Start	Finish	Distance
In-Port Race	14 October 2017		(Spain) Alicante		
Leg 1	22 October 2017	28 October	(Spain) Alicante	(Portugal) Lisbon	1,650 nm
In-Port Race	3 November 2017		(Portugal) Lisbon		
Leg 2	5 November 2017	24 November	(Portugal) Lisbon	(South Africa) Cape Town	7,000 nm
In-Port Race	8 December 2017		(South Africa) Cape Town		
Leg 3	10 December 2017	27 December	(South Africa) Cape Town	(Australia) Melbourne	6,500 nm
Leg 4	2 January 2018	19 January	(Australia) Melbourne	Hong Kong	6,000 nm
In-Port Race	27 & 28 January 2018		Hong Kong		
Leg 5 (non-scoring)	1 February 2018		Hong Kong	(China) Guangzhou	100 nm
In-Port Race	3 February 2018		(China) Guangzhou		
Leg 5 (non-scoring)	5 February 2018		(China) Guangzhou	Hong Kong	100 nm
Leg 6	7 February 2018	27 February 2018	Hong Kong	(New Zealand) Auckland	5,600 nm
In-Port Race	10 March 2018		(New Zealand) Auckland		
Leg 7	18 March 2018	3 April 2018	(New Zealand) Auckland	(Brazil) Itajaí	7,500 nm
In-Port Race	20 April 2018		(Brazil) Itajaí		
Leg 8	22 April 2018	8 May 2018	(Brazil) Itajaí	(United States) Newport	5,500 nm
In-Port Race	19 May 2018		(United States) Newport		
Leg 9	20 May 2018	29 May 2018	(United States) Newport	(Wales) Cardiff	3,300 nm
In-Port Race	8 June 2018		(Wales) Cardiff		
Leg 10	10 June 2018	14 June 2018	(Wales) Cardiff	(Sweden) Gothenburg	1,230 nm
In-Port Race	17 June 2018		(Sweden) Gothenburg		
Leg 11	21 June 2018	24 June 2018	(Sweden) Gothenburg	(Netherlands) The Hague	520 nm
In-Port Race	30 June 2018		(Netherlands) The Hague		

Notes (134 sailing days for race winners and 10 In-port racing days):

== Results ==
As opposed to the previous edition, scoring was based on a high-points system, with the winner of every leg scoring one bonus point (7+1 bonus point for a win, 6 for second, 5 for third, etc.). The two Southern Ocean legs – from Cape Town to Melbourne, and Auckland to Itajaí, plus the North Atlantic leg near the end of the race, Newport to Cardiff – all scored double points. There was a bonus point for the first team to round Cape Horn in a nod to the historic significance of this turning point in the race. A further bonus point was awarded for the team with the best total elapsed time overall in the race. The In-Port Series didn't count in the overall points but remained the tiebreaker should teams be tied on points at the finish in The Hague.

=== Overall Leg standings ===
	Leg 1 (Spain) (Portugal)	Leg 2 (Portugal) (South Africa)	Leg 3 (South Africa) (Australia)	Leg 4 (Australia) (Hong Kong)	Leg 5 (Hong Kong) (China)	Leg 6 (China) (New Zealand)	Leg 7 (New Zealand) (Brazil)	Leg 8 (Brazil) (United States)	Leg 9 (United States) (Wales)	Leg 10 (Wales) (Sweden)	Leg 11 (Sweden) (Netherlands)	Bonus	Total
Dongfeng	5	6	12	6	1	4	12	4	10	4	7	2 ^{3}	73
MAPFRE	6	7	14	4	1	5	6	7	6	6	5	3	70
Team Brunel	2	4	8	3	1	2	14	6	14	7	4	4 ^{4}	69
AkzoNobel	4	3	2	5	1	7	10	3	12	5	6	1	59
Vestas 11th Hour	7	5	10	Ret ^{2}	DNS	DNS	Ret	5	8	2	1	1	39
Turn the Tide on Plastic	1	1	4	2	1	3	8	2	4	3	3	-	32
Sun Hung Kai/Scallywag	3	2	6	7	1	6	Ret	1	2	1	2	1	32

- ^2 — Retired from leg after damage sustained from collision with commercial fishing vessel approximately 30 miles from the finish in Hong Kong. The collision resulted in the loss of the fishing vessel and the fatality of one of the crew members several hours later in a local hospital. Vestas 11th Hour Racing issued a Mayday distress call on behalf of the other vessel and undertook a search and rescue mission immediately following the incident.
- ^3 — 1 point for leg win, 1 point for elapsed time.
- ^4 — 3 points for leg win, 1 point for first around Cape Horn.

=== In-port series ===
	Ali (Spain)	Lis (Portugal)	CT (South Africa)	HK (Hong Kong)	Gzu (China)	Auc (New Zealand)	Ita (Brazil)	NP (United States)	Car (Wales)	Got (Sweden)	DH (Netherlands)	Total
MAPFRE	7	6	6	6	7	5	7	6	6	5	3	64
Dongfeng	6	5	7	7	2	7	5	3	7	1	6	56
Team Brunel	4	7	2	4	6	3	3	7	5	2	7	50
AkzoNobel	2	4	5	5	5	6	6	2	4	6	5	50
Vestas 11th Hour	5	3	4	DNS	DNS	4	2	5	3	7	2	35
Turn the Tide on Plastic	1	1	3	2	3	1	4	1	1	4	4	25
Sun Hung Kai/Scallywag	3	2	1	3	4	2	DNS	4	2	3	1	25

== Overall Results ==
Pos	Sail Number	Yacht	Country	Yacht Type	LOA (Metres)	Skipper	Points
1	CHN 1969	Dongfeng Race Team	China	Farr Volvo Ocean 65	20.37	Charles Caudrelier	73
2	ESP 1	MAPFRE	Spain	Farr Volvo Ocean 65	20.37	Xabier Fernández	70
3	NED 8	Team Brunel	Netherlands	Farr Volvo Ocean 65	20.37	Bouwe Bekking	69
4	NED 65	Team AkzoNobel	Netherlands	Farr Volvo Ocean 65	20.37	Simeon Tienpont	59
5	USA 11	Vestas 11th Hour Racing	United States; Denmark	Farr Volvo Ocean 65	20.37	Charlie Enright	39
6	UN 65	Turn the Tide on Plastic	United Nations	Farr Volvo Ocean 65	20.37	Dee Caffari	32
7	HKG 65	Team Sun Hung Kai-Scallywag	Hong Kong	Farr Volvo Ocean 65	20.37	David Witt	32
