= Volvo Ocean 65 =

Monohull racing yachts

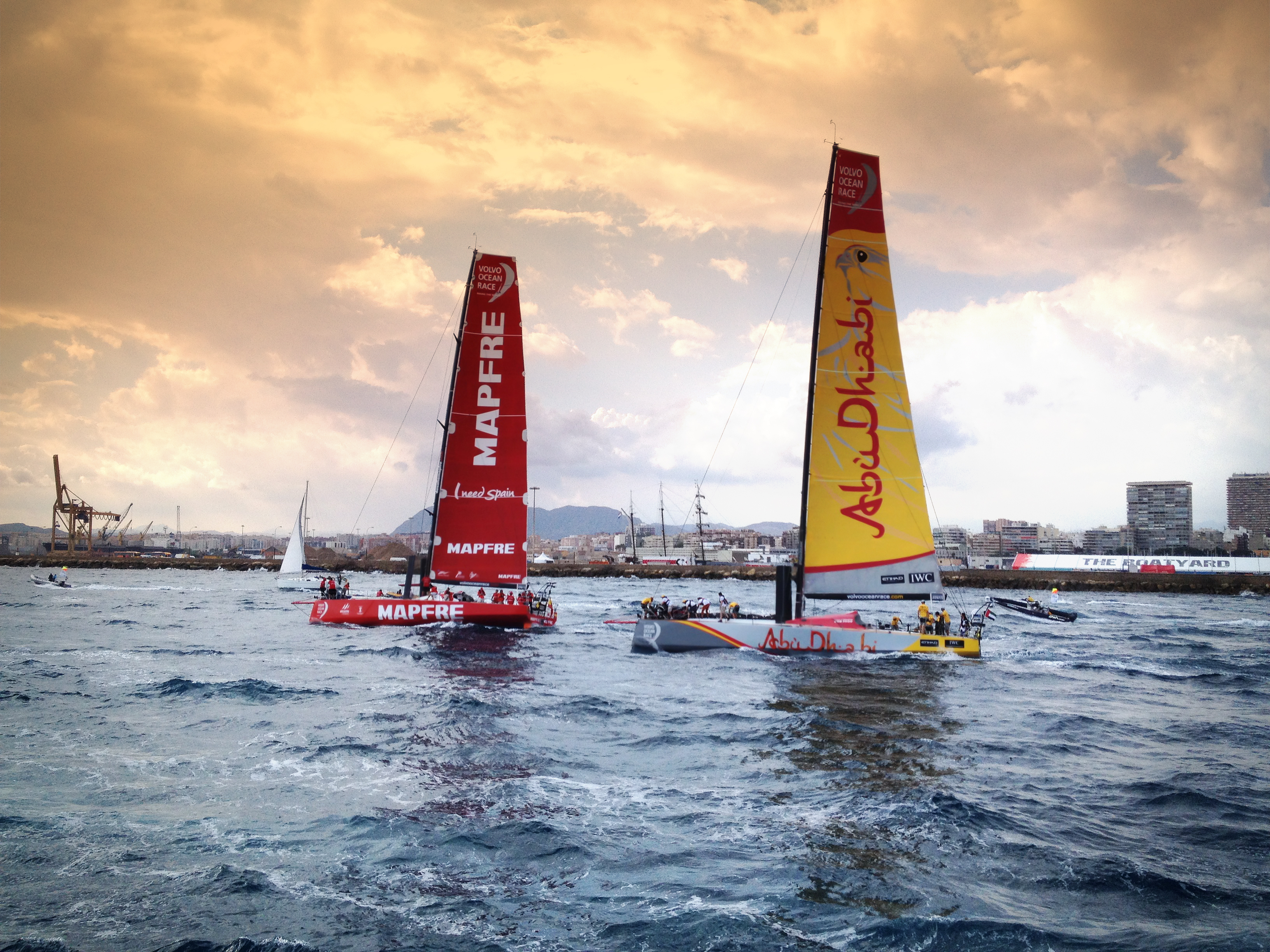
- The Volvo Ocean 65 Mapfre and Azzam at the start of the 2014–15 Volvo Ocean Race in Alicante in October 2014

Development
- Designer: Farr Yacht Design

Boat
- Draft: 4.78 m (15.7 ft)

Hull
- LOA: 22.14 m (72.6 ft)
- LWL: 20.00 m (65.62 ft)
- Beam: 5.60 m (18.4 ft)

The Volvo Ocean 65 is a class of monohull racing yachts. It is the successor to the Volvo Open 70 yacht used in past editions of the Volvo Ocean Race. It was announced at a conference in Lorient, France, during a stopover in the 2011–12 Volvo Ocean Race. The yacht was used for the 2014–2015, the 2017–2018 and the 2023 editions. The 2014–2015 Volvo Ocean Race was the first one-design event.

== Design ==
The yacht was designed, by Farr Yacht Design, to be a cheaper and safer alternative to the expensive and highly stressed Volvo Open 70.

After many safety concerns in the 2011–12 Volvo Ocean Race, many began doubting the safety of the Volvo Open 70, due to many designers opting for fast designs while failing to meet safety requirements. Former Volvo Ocean Race CEO, and four time competitor Knut Frostad hinted at a new boat design to address the current safety concerns in a statement he made during a press conference on April 4, 2012, stating: "It's important that we don't leap to any conclusions about why these breakages have happened. Some of them are clearly not related. However, we will take the current issues into account as we make decisions on rules and technology we will be using in the future." Frostad also went on to say "We have already put in a lot of work, discussing with teams, designers and all other stakeholders about the boats and the rules we will use in the future, and we expect to be in a position to announce a decision on that before the end of the current race."

On June 28, 2012, Knut Frostad revealed the design at a press conference in Lorient during a stopover in the 2011–12 Volvo Ocean Race. In becoming a one-design event, the new boats are hoped to "significantly reduce the cost of mounting a campaign and bring the size of the fleet to 8–10 boats for future editions." Frostad went on to state an entire campaign for future editions of the race would be around €15 million, and a "ready to sail" boat, including pre-race and race sails would be around €4.5 million in comparison to the €30–40 million region a current campaign can fall into.

== Construction ==
It takes 7 months and 36000 man hours to build, assemble, and paint a Volvo Ocean 65. There are 120 boatbuilders who work with 70 suppliers to outfit the boat.

== Yachts ==
There are currently eight Volvo Ocean 65's. They have all been brought to the same standard between the 2014–2015 and the 2017–2018 race at an estimated upgrade cost in the €1 million range.

Volvo Ocean 65's and teams
Yacht MMSI	2014–2015 Team	2017–2018 Team	2021 Team*	2023 Team
224530860	(Spain) Mapfre	(Spain) Mapfre	Sailing Poland	
470437000	(United Arab Emirates) Abu Dhabi Ocean Racing	(Hong Kong) Sun Hung Kai/Scallywag	(Mexico) Viva México	(Mexico) Viva México
235101548	(Sweden) Team SCA		(Lithuania) Ambersail II	(Lithuania) Ambersail II
319081500	(Denmark) Team Vestas Wind	(United Nations) Turn the Tide on Plastic		
319060300	(China) Dongfeng Race Team	(China) Dongfeng Race Team	(Portugal) Mirpuri Foundation Racing	(Portugal) Mirpuri Foundation Racing
244780246	(Netherlands) Team Brunel	(Netherlands) Team Brunel	(Netherlands) Team Childhood I	(Netherlands) Team JAJO
367616310	(United States) (Turkey) Team Alvimedica	(Denmark) (United States) Vestas 11th Hour Racing	(Austria) Austrian Ocean Racing	(Austria) (Italy) Austrian Ocean Racing p/b Team Genova
319119500	N/A (built new for 2017)	(Netherlands) Team AkzoNobel		(Poland) WindWhisper Racing Team

*The Ocean Race Europe

== Changes for 2017–2018 race ==
The yachts featured a 500W Watt & Sea hydrogenerator to reduce emissions and wear on the Volvo Penta Marine engine.

== Partners and equipment ==
Suppliers and Equipment
Supplier	Equipment
North Sails.	Sails
Southern Spars	Mast
Future Fibres Rigging Systems	ECsix carbon rigging
Future Fibres Rigging Systems	TorqueLite 2.0 Furling cables
North Technology Group	Forestays in the removable furling sail
Inmarsat	data and voice transmission equipment
Gottifredi Maffioli	3000 meters of running rigging
Equiplite	Main halyard block, barberhaul blocks, and lead blocks
Mastervolt	alternators, regulators, batteries, chargers and power management systems
Diverse Yacht Services	system integrator for electrical systems
Cariboni	Keel Canting mechanisms and keel bearings
Harken	Winch systems
Iron Brothers	Keel and bulb
Volvo Penta Marine Engines	75 horsepower Volvo Penta D2-75
KZ Racefurlers	furlers
Spinlock	Clutches and jammers
Watt & Sea	Hydrogenerator

== Specifications ==
Features	Measurements / Notes
Hull length	20.37 m (defined as 66 ft)
Length waterline (design)	20.00 m (defined as 65 ft)
Length overall (incl. bowsprit)	22.14 m (defined as 72 ft)
Hull beam	5.60 m (18.4 ft)
Max draft	4.78 m (15.8 ft)
Boat weight (empty)	12,500 kg (27,557 lb)
Keel arrangement	Canting keel to ±40° with 5° of incline at axis
Daggerboards	Twin, reversible, retracting asymmetric daggerboards
Rudders	Twin under hull with spare that may also be transom hung
Aft Water Ballast	Twin 800L ballast tanks under cockpit sides at transom
Forward Water Ballast	Single centerline 1000L ballast tank forward of mast
Rig Height	30.30 m (99.4 ft)
Rig Arrangement	Deck stepped, twin backstays with deflectors
Bowsprit Length	2.14 m (7 ft)
Mainsail Area	163 m^{2} (3 reefing points, 6 battens)
Working Headsail (J1) Area	133 m^{2} (Fixed with hanks on the permanent forestay; horizontal battens)
Upwind Sail Area	296–451 m^{2} (Mainsail and Jib 1 or Masthead Code 0, plus Jib 2 or Jib 3)
Downwind Sail Area	578+ m^{2} (Mainsail and A3 gennaker, additional staysails are permitted)

== Comparison to Volvo Open 70 ==
Features	Ocean 65	Volvo Open 70
Length	19.80 m (65 ft)/20.37 (66 ft)	21.50 m (70.5 ft)
Beam	5.60 m	5.70 m
Max Draft	4.78 m	4.50 m
Boat Weight	12,500 kg	14,000 kg
Righting moment (RM 25) including stacking and Water Ballast	33,000 kg/m	40,000 kg/m
Cant Angle	40°	40°
Rig Height	30.30 m (99.4 ft)	31.50 m (103.3 ft)
Freeboard at Mast	1.72 m	1.60 m
Mainsail Area	151 m^{2}	175 m^{2}
Working Headsail Area	135 m^{2} (J1)	200 m^{2} (G1)
Bowsprit length	2.15 m (7 ft)	1.82 m (6 ft)
Number of sails (including storm sails)	7	10
Water Ballast	1x1000L (Centerline, Fwd) 2x800L (Aft Wing Tanks)	1x1600L (Centerline, Aft)

== Reception ==
After unveiling the boat design, the reception was mostly positive.

=== Positive ===
Former competitor and skipper, Grant Dalton stated the new design "attacks the single problem that surrounds our sport at the moment, and that is ridiculous cost."

=== Negative ===
The most negative feedback to the announcement of a one-design came from yacht designer Juan Kouyoumdjian whose designs had won the previous three editions of the race (2005–06, 2008–09 and 2011–12). He stated his disapproval of the Volvo Ocean Race becoming a one-design event. Juan addressed the main issue of Volvo Open 70's being expensive stating that he could "definitely confirm" the boats he designed fell into the €5 million range, and that despite trying to make the race more accessible to sponsors and more of a testament to a sailors skill, rather than budget, "the richest will always win." Despite his criticism, he also went on to confirm that in the event that the Volvo Ocean Race became a one-design event, he had already been approached to optimize the Volvo 65 design for a "potential future team."

== Further information ==
Class Rules and Specifications.

Refit Scope for 2017.

== See also ==
- IMOCA 60
