= 2014–2015 Volvo Ocean Race =

2014–15 Volvo Ocean Race

Event title
- Edition: 12th
- Dates: 19 Oct 2014 – 27 June 2015
- Yachts: Volvo Ocean 65

Competitors
- Competitors: 7

Results
- Winner: Abu Dhabi Ocean Racing

The 2014–15 Volvo Ocean Race was the 12th edition of the round-the-world Volvo Ocean Race. It started on 19 October 2014 in Alicante, Spain, and concluded in June 2015 in Gothenburg, Sweden. After 38,739 nautical miles of ocean racing, Abu Dhabi Ocean Racing led by skipper Ian Walker claimed the overall trophy.

== Yachts ==
For the first time, the race is a one-design event. The Volvo Ocean 65 was designed by Farr Yacht Design in response to concerns about safety and cost. The Volvo Ocean Race ensures a minimum of eight boats are built.

The aim was to reduce participation cost to around 15 million euros per entry.

The boats are maintained by a common team, The Boatyard. They manage the spares, repairs, and maintenance for all the teams.

=== Onboard reporters ===
For this edition of the race, each yacht had an onboard reporter. They are responsible for producing 4 minutes of video, 200 words, and 8 photographs a day. These media assets are sent to the Volvo Ocean Race Media Center in Alicante for editing and wide dissemination. OBRs were allowed to perform additional activities beyond producing content, however, they may not assist in the sailing of the boat.

== Participants ==
Seven teams are participating in this edition of the Volvo Ocean Race. One of them, Team SCA, is a women-only team.

| Team | Flag and Sail | Skipper |
|---|---|---|
| Team SCA | (Sweden) SWE 1929 | (United Kingdom) Samantha Davies |
| Abu Dhabi Ocean Racing | (United Arab Emirates) UAE 2 | (United Kingdom) Ian Walker |
| Dongfeng Race Team | (China) CHN 1969 | (France) Charles Caudrelier |
| Team Brunel | (Netherlands) NED 1 | (Netherlands) Bouwe Bekking |
| Team Alvimedica | (United States) (Turkey) USA 4 | (United States) Charlie Enright |
| MAPFRE | (Spain) ESP 1 | (Spain) Iker Martinez |
| Team Vestas Wind | (Denmark) | (Australia) Chris Nicholson |

Sailors by nationality

| Country | Sailors |
|---|---|
| France | 12 |
| United Kingdom | 10 |
| Australia | 8 |
| United States | 8 |
| Spain | 7 |
| China | 6 |
| Netherlands | 6 |
| New Zealand | 5 |
| Denmark | 3 |
| Argentina | 2 |
| Switzerland | 2 |
| Belgium | 1 |
| Brazil | 1 |
| Ireland | 1 |
| Italy | 1 |
| Lithuania | 1 |
| Sweden | 1 |
| United Arab Emirates | 1 |

== Route ==
| Event | Start date | Finish date | Start | Finish | Distance |
|---|---|---|---|---|---|
| In-Port Race | 4 October 2014 | | (Spain) Alicante | | |
| Leg 1 | 11 October 2014 | 5 November 2014 | (Spain) Alicante | (South Africa) Cape Town | 6,487 nm |
| In-Port Race | 15 November 2014 | | (South Africa) Cape Town | | |
| Leg 2 | 19 November 2014 | 13 December 2014 | (South Africa) Cape Town | (United Arab Emirates) Abu Dhabi | 5,185 nm |
| In-Port Race | 2 January 2015 | | (United Arab Emirates) Abu Dhabi | | |
| Leg 3 | 3 January 2015 | 27 January 2015 | (United Arab Emirates) Abu Dhabi | (China) Sanya | 4,642 nm |
| In-Port Race | 7 February 2015 | | (China) Sanya | | |
| Leg 4 | 8 February 2015 | 28 February 2015 | (China) Sanya | (New Zealand) Auckland | 5,264 nm |
| In-Port Race | 14 March 2015 | | (New Zealand) Auckland | | |
| Leg 5 | 18 March 2015^{1} | 5 April 2015 | (New Zealand) Auckland | (Brazil) Itajaí | 6,776 nm |
| In-Port Race | 18 April 2015 | | (Brazil) Itajaí | | |
| Leg 6 | 19 April 2015 | 7 May 2015 | (Brazil) Itajaí | (United States) Newport | 5,010 nm |
| In-Port Race | 16 May 2015 | | (United States) Newport | | |
| Leg 7 | 17 May 2015 | 27 May 2015 | (United States) Newport | (Portugal) Lisbon | 2,800 nm |
| In-Port Race | 6 June 2015 | | (Portugal) Lisbon | | |
| Leg 8 | 7 June 2015 | 11 June 2015 | (Portugal) Lisbon | (France) Lorient | 647 nm |
| In-Port Race | 14 June 2015 | | (France) Lorient | | |
| Leg 9 | 17 June 2015 | 22 June 2015 | (France) Lorient | (Sweden) Gothenburg | 960 nm |
| Pit stop | 19 June 2015 | | (Netherlands) The Hague | | |
| In-Port Race | 27 June 2015 | | (Sweden) Gothenburg | | |

Notes (157 sailing days for race winners and 10 In-port racing days):

- ^1 Originally scheduled to begin on 15 March 2015, but delayed because of Cyclone Pam.

== Results ==
The point standings are done via low points. The winner of each leg/in-port race will receive 1 point, runner up will receive 2 points, and so on down to the final finisher who will receive 7 points. Failure to finish a leg is counted as 8 points. The overall winner will be the one the lowest number of leg points, with the in-port points being used for tie-breaking.

=== Overall Leg standings ===
| | Leg 1 (Spain) (South Africa) | Leg 2 (South Africa) (United Arab Emirates) | Leg 3 (United Arab Emirates) (China) | Leg 4 (China) (New Zealand) | Leg 5 (New Zealand) (Brazil) | Leg 6 (Brazil) (United States) | Leg 7 (United States) (Portugal) | Leg 8 (Portugal) (France) | Leg 9 (France) (Sweden) | Penalty/ Redress | Total |
|---|---|---|---|---|---|---|---|---|---|---|---|
| Abu Dhabi Ocean Racing | 1 | 3 | 2 | 2 | 1 | 2 | 5 | 3 | 5 | | 24 |
| Team Brunel | 3 | 1 | 5 | 5 | 4 | 3 | 1 | 5 | 2 | | 29 |
| Dongfeng Race Team | 2 | 2 | 1 | 3 | DNF^{2} | 1 | 4 | 7 | 4 | 1^{5} | 33 |
| MAPFRE | 7 | 4 | 4 | 1 | 2 | 4 | 2 | 4 | 3 | 3^{4} ^{5} | 34 |
| Team Alvimedica | 5 | 5 | 3 | 4 | 3 | 5 | 3 | 6 | 1 | -1^{3} | 34 |
| Team SCA | 6 | 6 | 6 | 6 | 5 | 6 | 6 | 1 | 7 | 2^{5} | 51 |
| Team Vestas Wind | 4 | DNF^{1} | DNS | DNS | DNS | DNS | DNS | 2 | 6 | | 60 |

Notes:

- ^1 - Team Vestas Wind was grounded on the Cargados Carajos Shoals near Mauritius. They re-joined the race for leg 8.
- ^2 - Dongfeng suffered a broken mast near Cape Horn and had to abandon leg 5.
- ^3 - Team Alvimedica finished leg 2 in fifth place, but were awarded 1 point redress for standing by the grounded Team Vestas Wind
- ^4 - MAPFRE finished leg 5 in second position, but were given two points penalty for rules breaches.
- ^5 - MAPFRE and Dongfeng (1 point each) and SCA (2 points) were handed penalty points after leg 7 for infringing sailing rules.

=== In-port series ===
| | Ali (Spain) | CT (South Africa) | AD (United Arab Emirates) | San (China) | Auc (New Zealand) | Ita (Brazil) | NP (United States) | Lis (Portugal) | Lor (France) | Got (Sweden) | Total |
|---|---|---|---|---|---|---|---|---|---|---|---|
| Abu Dhabi Ocean Racing | 2 | 1 | 3 | 2 | 6 | 2 | 3 | 2 | 4 | 6 | 31 |
| Team Brunel | 4 | 2 | 2 | 4 | 2 | 1 | 5 | 5 | 6 | 1 | 32 |
| Team SCA | 6 | 3 | 1 | 5 | 1 | 4 | 4 | 4 | 5 | 2 | 35 |
| MAPFRE | 3 | 7 | 6 | 6 | 3 | 5 | 1 | 1 | 2 | 3 | 37 |
| Team Alvimedica | 1 | 6 | 5 | 3 | 5 | 6 | 2 | 3 | 1 | 5 | 37 |
| Dongfeng Race Team | 5 | 4 | 4 | 1 | 4 | 3 | 6 | 6 | 3 | 4 | 40 |
| Team Vestas Wind | 7 | 5 | DNS | DNS | DNS | DNS | DNS | 7 | 7 | 7 | 73 |

== Overall Results ==
| Pos | Sail Number | Yacht | Country | Yacht Type | LOA (Metres) | Skipper | Points |
|---|---|---|---|---|---|---|---|
| 1 | UAE 2 | Abu Dhabi Ocean Racing-Azzam | United Arab Emirates | Farr Volvo Ocean 65 | 20.37 | Ian Walker | 24 |
| 2 | NED 1 | Team Brunel | Netherlands | Farr Volvo Ocean 65 | 20.37 | Bouwe Bekking | 29 |
| 3 | CHN 1969 | Dongfeng Race Team | China | Farr Volvo Ocean 65 | 20.37 | Charles Caudrelier | 33 |
| 4 | ESP 1 | MAPFRE | Spain | Farr Volvo Ocean 65 | 20.37 | Iker Martínez | 34 |
| 5 | USA 4 | Team Alvimedica | United States; Turkey | Farr Volvo Ocean 65 | 20.37 | Charlie Enright | 34 |
| 6 | SWE 1929 | Team SCA | Sweden | Farr Volvo Ocean 65 | 20.37 | Samantha Davies | 51 |
| 7 | DEN 65 | Team Vestas Wind | Denmark | Farr Volvo Ocean 65 | 20.37 | Chris Nicholson | 60 |

== Media ==
The race was chronicled in a daily show hosted by Genny Tulloch called Inside Tack - Life at the Extreme, and a weekly show -Life at the Extreme.
