= Pablo Arrarte =

Spanish sailor

Personal information
- Nationality: Spanish
- Born: 11 November 1980 (age 44); Santander, Spain

Sport
- Sport: Sailing

Pablo Arrarte (born 11 November 1980) is a Spanish sailor. He competed in the Star event at the 2004 Summer Olympics.
