= Farr Yacht Design =

Racing yacht design firm

- Type: Privately Held Company
- Industry: Yacht Design
- Founded: 1981
- Founders: Bruce Farr, Russell Bowler
- Headquarters: Annapolis, Maryland, United States,
- Key people: Britton Ward (Principal)
- Website: FarrDesign.com

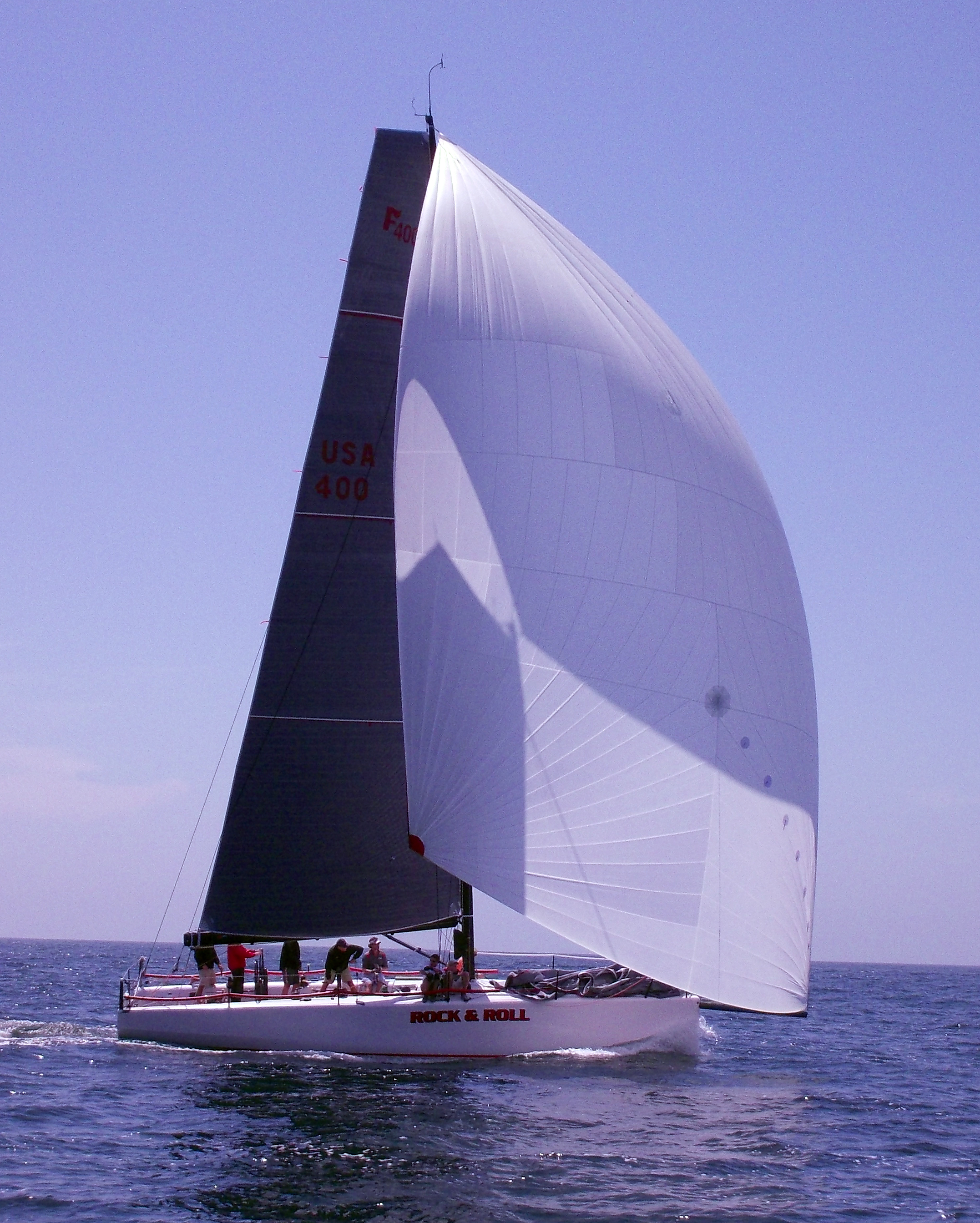
Farr 400 Rock and Roll sailing off Newport Beach California

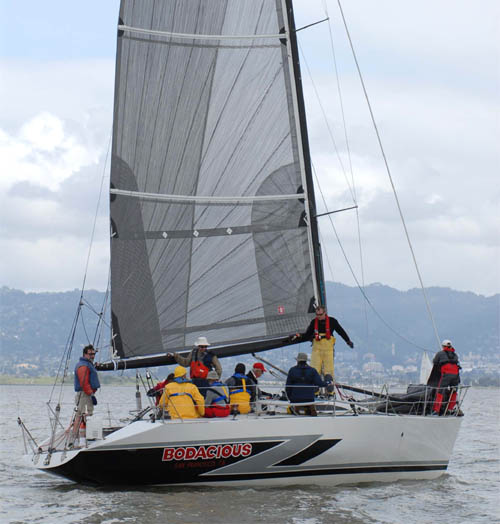
Farr 40 1 Ton Bodacious racing on San Francisco Bay

Farr Yacht Design, founded by Bruce Farr in Auckland, New Zealand, is a racing yacht design firm based in Annapolis, Maryland, United States. Today the firm is led by Britton Ward. Its yachts measure from 25 feet (7.6 m) to 125 feet (38 m). Farr develops custom and production yachts, including interiors, sails, and hull design. Farr uses outside research and development with tank testing and wind tunnels. Farr-designed yachts have won and placed well in a broad range of races.

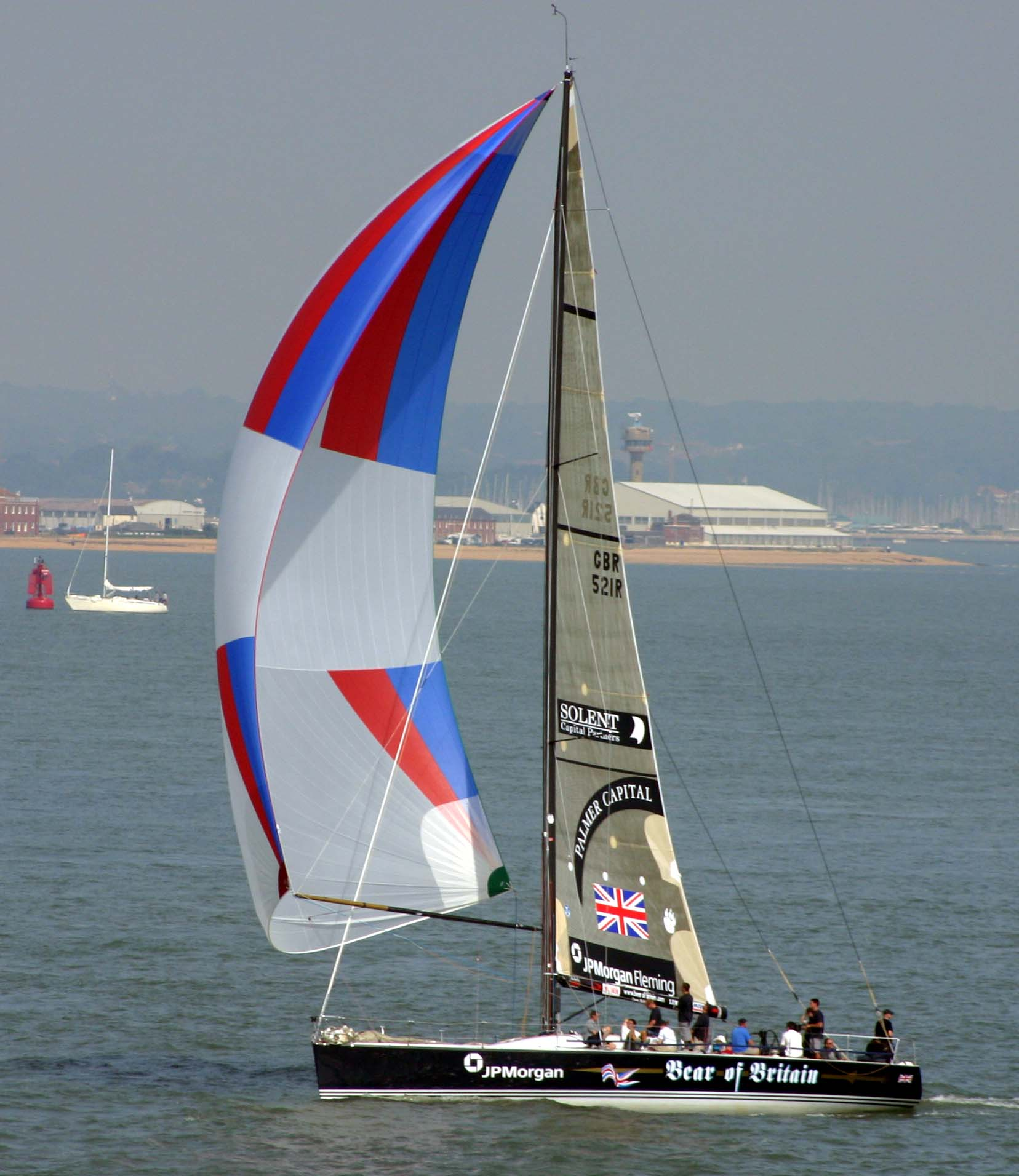
Bear of Britain, a Farr 52 with masthead spinnaker in front of Calshot Spit

== History ==
Bruce Farr first achieved acclaim as a sailboat designer in the highly competitive 18 ft Skiff class, popular in Australia and New Zealand. Farr designs won the 18 ft Skiff Giltinan World title several times in the early 1970s. Starting in 1973, Bruce was able to focus full-time on designing sailboats. Another New Zealander active as both a designer and sailor in the 18 ft fleet, Russel Bowler, a civil engineer by training, introduced the fiberglass-foam sandwich construction technique to the 18 ft class in 1977 with a boat 1/3 lighter and possessing a lower wetted area than the competition. Starting in 1976, Bowler provided structural engineering services to Farr as a consultant, and joined him full-time in 1980. Within a year, they moved the office to Annapolis in order to get better access to the northern hemisphere yacht market.

== Farr designed boats ==
The yachts designed by Farr are primarily light-displacement, fractional rig, wide sterned, shallow hulled yachts. Many of Bruce Farr's early designs were comparatively skiff-like in appearance, with shallow hulls, wide sterns and light displacement. The result is a quicker, faster hull than more traditional racing yacht designs. Over the years more and more designers have incorporated these ideas. The Volvo Open 70 class yachts are examples of this trend.

In addition to one design yachts (table), Farr Yacht Design has designed a various yachts for Volvo Ocean Race (and earlier Whitbread) teams under the Volvo Open 70, Volvo Ocean 60 and Whitbread 60 rule. The company has also designed the Volvo Ocean 65 used in the 2014-15 edition of the race and 2017-18 edition.

Major yacht builders such as Bavaria Yachtbau and Beneteau have commissioned Farr-designed yachts for their cruising lines of production sailboats. This includes Bavaria's Vision and Cruiser lines and Beneteau's First line.

Designs have been also made by Farr Yacht Design under the GP42 and TP 52 (yacht) rule and for racing based on IRC (sailing), International Measurement System rating.

Other notable design include (super) Maxi's and America's Cup yachts (for Team BMW Oracle Racing (2007, 2003), Young America (2000) Tag Heuer (1995), New Zealand (1992, 1988, 1987)) and the 30m maxi yacht Leopard3.

Design	PHRF
Farr 10/20 ODR	108
Farr 12-20	81
Farr 30½ ton	156
Mumm 30 (after 2007 Farr 30 (yacht))	54
Farr 33	102
Farr 36	96
Mumm 36	42
Farr 38	83
Farr 38-1	84
Farr 395	24
Farr 40 1 ton	69
Farr 40 ODR	6
Farr 42	66
Farr 44	48
Farr 46	66
Farr 52	
Farr 68	-39
Farr 727	192
Farr 740 Sport	162

- Note: PHRF rating shown is the Northern California Base Rate full keel with standard mast unless otherwise described.

== Sources ==
- Flying 18s Giltinan History
- Flying 18s News
- Farr 727
