= List of Clipper Round the World Yacht Race results =

Results of episodes of the Clipper Round The World Yacht Race

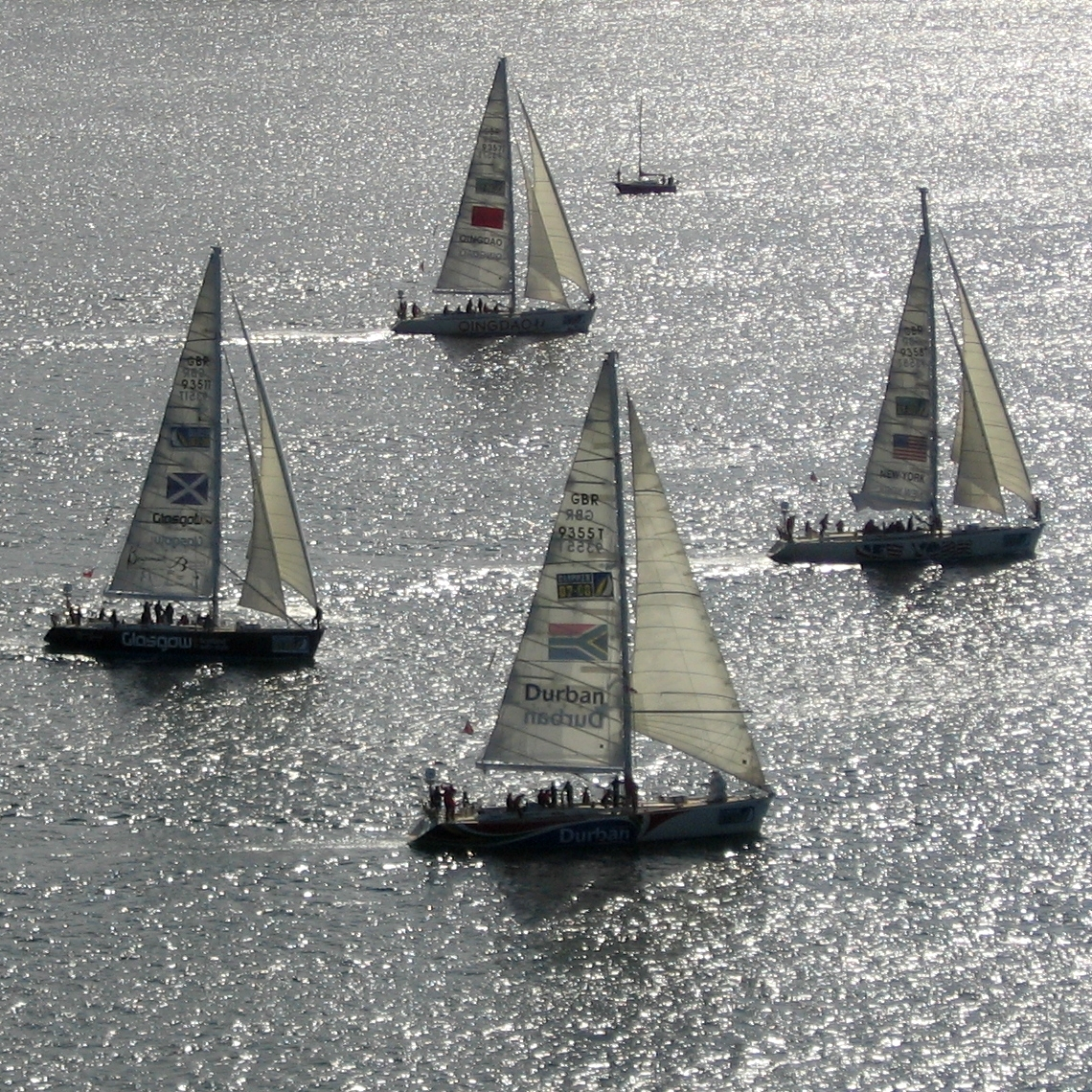
Approaching the starting line on a leg of the Clipper Round the World Yacht Race in Halifax, Nova Scotia, 12 June 2008

The Clipper Round the World Yacht Race was conceived in 1995 by Sir Robin Knox-Johnston and together with William Ward (CEO), founded Clipper Ventures, a company that would run the race. The race takes paying amateur crews on one or more legs of a circumnavigation of the globe in specially designed yachts owned by Clipper Ventures. Three different classes of yacht have been used throughout the race, the Clipper 60, Clipper 68 and Clipper 70s. The race ran every two years between 1996 and 2002, and then skipped a year, with subsequent races beginning in 2005, 2007, 2009, 2013, 2015, 2017 and 2019.

== Clipper 1996 ==
=== Route ===
The first race took a route starting from Plymouth and then sailing to Madeira, Fort Lauderdale, Panama, Galapagos, Hawaii, Yokohama, Shanghai, Hong Kong, Singapore, Seychelles, Durban, Cape Town, Salvador (Brazil), the Azores and back to Plymouth.

=== Results ===
Clipper '96 Results
Position	Boat	Skipper	Points
1	Ariel	Ras Turner	24
2	Mermerus	Jim Thom	47
3	Taeping	Adrian Faiers	61
4	Chrysolite	Colin de Mowbray	64
5	Blackadder	Andrew Spedding	77
6	Serica	Bluey Neale	82
7	Thermopylae	Mervyn Wheatley	91
8	Antiope	Charlie Osborne	93

The overall scores were calculated based on the number of points awarded for each race, with first place scoring one point, second scoring two points and so on.

== Clipper 1998 ==
=== Fleet ===
Seven boats raced, with Blackadder not competing.

=== Route ===
The route was largely the same as the '96 race, but called briefly at Nassau in the Bahamas before going to Marina Hemingway, five miles to the west of Havana, a direct course between the USA and Cuba being impossible.

=== Results ===
The race was won, convincingly, by Alex Thomson, who was the youngest skipper to win a round the world yacht race at just 24. Thomson used the win to springboard him into the international racing scene on his Open 60 Hugo Boss.

Clipper '98 Results
Position	Boat	Skipper	Points
1	Ariel	Alex Thomson	24.5
2	Antiope	Keith Harris	50
3	Chrysolite	Tim Hedges	58.5
4	Mermerus	Barney Sollars	67
5	Taeping	Nick Fleming	71.5
6	Serica	Rupert Dean	76
7	Thermopylae	Malcolm Todd	82.5

== The Times Clipper 2000 Race ==
This was the only race to have a title sponsor, with the UK daily broadsheet The Times sponsoring the race and trophy.

=== Fleet ===
All eight Clipper 60 yachts took part, and were renamed after cities in the UK (Portsmouth, Plymouth, Bristol, Glasgow, Leeds, London, Jersey and Liverpool), with the crews, where possible, drawn from the city their boat was named for.

=== Route ===
The race started and finished in Portsmouth Harbour. The stop in the Azores was replaced by one in New York City and to compensate for the extra distance the Seychelles to Durban to Cape Town leg was reduced to Mauritius to Cape Town.

The race attempted to make it from Yokohama to Shanghai but a fierce storm east of Tokyo Bay in March 2001 caused damage to several of the boats and by the time they had returned to Japan for repair, the entry visas to China had lapsed. Instead, the fleet raced from Yokohama to Naha, the capital of the Japanese island, Okinawa.

Another diversion took place in May 2001 when mechanical problems to Bristol Clipper’s generator meant the fleet spent two days in Christmas Island and the crews got an unexpected Australian stamp in their passports.

In another modification to the Clipper ‘96 and Clipper ‘98 route, stops were included in Vilamoura (Portugal), Singapore and Mauritius with the penultimate race going from New York to the Channel Island port of St. Helier.

=== Results ===
The point scoring method was altered, with the races now scoring 8 points for a win, 7 for second and so on.

The Times Clipper 2000 Results
Position	Boat	Skipper	Points
1	Bristol	Bob Beggs	97.4
2	Jersey	Paul de la Haye	96
3	London	Stuart Gibson	82
4	Liverpool	Rupert Dean	77
5	Plymouth	Matt Baker	75
6	Portsmouth	Martin Clough	72
7	Leeds	Simon Rowell	40
8	Glasgow	Ed Green	38

== Clipper 2002-03 Race ==
=== Fleet ===
This was to be the fourth and final circumnavigation for the Clipper 60 fleet. Three of the boats were renamed, and international cities were now added to the race, Hong Kong, Cape Town and New York.

=== Route ===
The start point was moved to Liverpool, and an estimated 40,000 spectators came to see the boats off despite a 24-hour delay due to storms in the Irish Sea. 100 mph (160 km/h) gusts turned the local waters into a boiling maelstrom and the start was postponed from the Sunday until the next day.

The race continued to go westwards. As in 2000, the attempt to race into Shanghai failed – this time thanks to the promised berthing facilities being withdrawn. Further along the route, the fleet was challenged by the SARS virus and the yachts were forced to find an alternative location close to Singapore. The popular Indonesian island of Batam provided the facilities and the stop proved so popular, it was a catalyst for Singapore to enter a yacht in the next running of the race.

=== Results ===
Clipper 2002 Results
Position	Boat	Skipper	Points
1	Jersey	Johnathan Brockhouse / Ed Green / Simon Rowell	97.5
2	Bristol	Richard Butler	95.5
3	Liverpool	Adam Kyffin	74
4	Hong Kong	Justin Taylor	71
5	Glasgow	Rupert Parkhouse	65
6	London	Rory Gillard	57.5
7	New York	Sam Fuller / Ross Daniel	55
8	Cape Town	Roger Steven-Jennings	30

== Clipper 2005–06 Race ==
=== Fleet ===
The 2005 race was the first to feature the larger Clipper 68 yachts.

After the initial three international boats from the 2002 race, the race was made fully international, with boats sponsored by Victoria, British Columbia, Canada, Qingdao, Durban, New York City, Singapore and Western Australia as well as the home teams of Liverpool, Glasgow, Cardiff and Jersey.

=== Route ===
The 2005 race was the first to circumnavigate from east to west. The route was altered to take account of the faster boats, and to take in stopovers at many of the sponsoring cities. For the first time there was a leg across the Southern Ocean between Durban and Fremantle, and a leg across the North Pacific between Qingdao and Victoria, British Columbia, Canada.

The race schedule was significantly altered when Glasgow Clipper reported keel problems in the South China Sea, and diverted to Subic Bay in the Philippines, followed by the rest of the fleet that were showing symptoms, causing an enforced 6 week stopover. The revised schedule dropped the planned stopover in Yokohama from the route, and moved the Caribbean stopover from Curaçao to Jamaica.

=== Results ===
Clipper 05–06 Leg Results
	Start	Liverpool	Cascais	Salvador	Durban	Fremantle	Singapore	Subic Bay	Qingdao	Victoria	Panama	Jamaica	New York	Jersey	Holyhead
	End	Cascais	Salvador	Durban	Fremantle	Singapore	Subic Bay	Qingdao	Victoria	Panama	Jamaica	New York	Jersey	Holyhead	Liverpool
CV1	Liverpool '08	1	2	Jt. 5	6	5	-	1	3	3	9	8	6	1	3
CV2	Glasgow: Scotland with Style	10	10	9	10 (-1)	9	-	8	8 (-2)	8 (-4)	10	4	9	7	9
CV3	Uniquely Singapore	4	6	Jt. 5.	9	6	-	4 (-1)	9 (-1)	1	4	1	7	4	6
CV4	westernaustralia.com	2	1	1	3	2	-	9	5	7	2	2	2	2	1
CV5	Jersey	9	7	10	5	8	-	10 (-2)	10 (-1)	10 (-4)	7	10	5	9	8
CV6	Durban	3	5	8	1 (-1)	1	-	3	2 (-1)	2	1	6	8	3	7
CV7	New York	6	4	2	7	3	-	6	7 (-1)	4	3	3	1	5	2
CV8	Qingdao	7	9	4	4	7	-	7	6	9	5	5	4	6	5
CV9	Victoria	8	8 (-1)	7	2	4	-	2 (-1)	1	6	8	7	3	10	4
CV10	Cardiff	5	3 (-1)	3	8	10	-	5 (-1)	4	5	6	9	10	8	10

Races score first = 10 points, second = 9 points, etc. However, Race 1 (Liverpool to Cascais) and Race 13 (Holyhead to Liverpool) were scored at half points. In addition, the race committee did sometimes apply points penalties, invariably for excessive sail damage. The penalty points are shown in brackets after the result.

The original race 6, from Singapore to Qingdao was abandoned when the fleet diverted to Subic, and no points were awarded.

Liverpool and Singapore were awarded a tie in Race 3, after Liverpool had a GPS failure, and could not confirm its finish time with sufficient accuracy to determine whether it was ahead or behind Singapore. 5.5 points were awarded to each boat.

Clipper 05–06 Results
Position	Boat	Skipper	Points
1	westernaustralia.com	Dave Pryce/Mark Preedy	94.5
2	Durban	Craig Miller	85.0
3	New York	Joff Bailey	82.0
4	Liverpool '08	Tim McGee (Sam Fuller Jamaica->New York)	80.5
5	Uniquely Singapore	Richard Falk	68.5
6	Victoria	Ewan Hind	65.0
7	Qingdao	Danny Watson	59.0
8	Cardiff	Conor Fogherty (Mervyn Wheatley Victoria->Panama)	51.5
9	Jersey	Mark Taylor/Simon Rowell/Richard Franklin/Mervyn Wheatley	25.5
10	Glasgow: Scotland with Style	Graeme Johnston/Rory Gillard	23.5

== Clipper 2007–08 Race ==
The Clipper 07–08 race started on 16 September 2007 in Liverpool.

=== Fleet ===
Once again, 10 Clipper 68s took part. There were some changes to the lineup with Victoria, Jersey and Cardiff replaced by Jamaica, Hull & Humber and Nova Scotia.

=== Route ===
The race had some changes compared to the 05–06 route. La Rochelle was the first stop, replacing Cascais, and the route for Leg 5 changed, with the race leaving Qingdao and heading to Santa Cruz, California via Hawaii, eliminating the stopovers in Yokohama and Victoria. The final leg also changed, with an extra stop in Halifax, and the final pitstop in Cork, rather than Jersey and then finished in Liverpool in July 2008.

=== Results ===
Clipper 07–08 Leg Results
	Start	Liverpool	La Rochelle	Salvador	Durban	Fremantle	Singapore	Qingdao	Hawaii	Santa Cruz	Panama	Jamaica	New York	Halifax	Cork
	End	La Rochelle	Salvador	Durban	Fremantle	Singapore	Qingdao	Hawaii	Santa Cruz	Panama	Jamaica	New York	Halifax	Cork	Liverpool
CV1	Liverpool '08	2	4	2	9	2	8	7	7	6	5	3	9	4	5
CV2	Glasgow: Scotland with Style	3	2	3	6	6	3	3	5	5	3	5	2	7	6
CV4	Uniquely Singapore	7	7	8	7	7	7	4	1	7	6	7	8	5	2
CV3	westernaustralia2011.com	9	6	6	2	3	6	RTD	DNC	9	10	2	1	9	9
CV5	Jamaica	RTD	10	9	8	9	5	8	6	8	8	6	10	6	7
CV6	Durban 2010 and Beyond	5	1	7	1	5	2	6	DNC	RTD	7	10	7	8	8
CV7	Hull & Humber	1	5	4*	4	4	4	1	4	1	1	8	4	3	3
CV8	Qingdao	6	8	5	3	10	10	5	8	2	4	4	3	2	4
CV9	New York	8	9	1	10	1	1	2	3	3	2	1	6	1	1
CV10	Nova Scotia	4	3	10	5	8	9	9	2	4	9	9	5	10	10

- In Race 3, Hull and Humber crossed the line first, but had a four-hour penalty applied for using her motor during a casualty evacuation near the start of the race. As New York were six minutes behind, and Liverpool and Glasgow also finished within four hours, Hull and Humber dropped to fourth place in that race.
- In Race 8, Western Australia and Durban did not compete after losing their masts in Race 7. The race committee awarded them points for the race based on their average position in races 1–7. Durban got 7 points, Western Australia got 5.

RTD = Retired, DNC = Did not compete

Clipper 07–08 Results
Position	Boat	Skipper	Points
1	New York	Jerry Crew/Duggie Gillespie	103.5
2	Hull & Humber	Danny Watson	98.0
3	Glasgow: Scotland with Style	Hannah Jenner	87.0
4	Qingdao	Marcus Cholerton-Brown	77.5
5	Liverpool '08	Ben Galloway	75.5
6	Durban 2010 and Beyond	Ricky Chalmers	70.0
7	Uniquely Singapore	Mark Preedy	69.0
8	westernaustralia2011.com	Martin Silk	65.0
9	Nova Scotia	Rob McInally	50.5
10	Jamaica	Simon Bradley	40.5

Where two teams are equal on points, their relative position is determined using the countback rule. That is, the team with the most first-place finishes is placed higher; if those are equal, look at second-place finishes, and so forth.

Points have been deducted for sail damage: Glasgow & Hull and Humber 4, Nova Scotia & Jamaica 3, Liverpool 1.

Race 1 was for half points.

== Clipper 2009–10 Race ==
The Clipper 2009–10 race started from Kingston upon Hull on the Humber Estuary on 13 September 2009. The race was won by Spirit of Australia on 17 July 2010, when the yachts returned to Hull Marina for a gala celebration.

=== Fleet ===
The same fleet of Clipper 68s took part. The yachts were named Hull and Humber, Qingdao, Uniquely Singapore, Cape Breton Island, Spirit of Australia, California, Edinburgh Inspiring Capital, Jamaica Lightning Bolt, Team Finland and Cork.

On 15 January 2010, Cork Clipper ran aground on the Gosong Mampango reef in the Java Sea at 3°35.1195′S 109°10.9′E. In 1992 it was reported that the reef and its associated light lie 0.9 nmi (1.7 km) east of their charted positions. The crew successfully evacuated the yacht and were aided by competitors Team California and Team Finland. Cork Clipper was abandoned a few days later after the decision was made that any attempt to salvage her would be uneconomical. A Challenge 67' yacht Aurora of London was chartered and prepared and re-branded as Cork in Antigua. She rejoined the race in Panama in May 2010, where she was skippered by Hannah Jenner - former 07/08 skipper of Glasgow - Scotland With Style. The Cork yacht was able to finish the race in style as they achieved line honours into their home port of Kinsale, and won the final race from IJmuiden to Hull; winning a second coveted yellow pennant.

=== Results ===
For this race, stealth mode was introduced along with scoring gates.

Clipper 09–10 Leg Results
	Start	Hull	La Rochelle	Rio de Janeiro	South Africa	Western Australia	Singapore	Qingdao	California	Panama	Caribbean	New York	Cape Breton Island	Cork	IJmuiden	Gate Points
	End	La Rochelle	Rio de Janeiro	South Africa	Western Australia	Singapore	Qingdao	California	Panama	Caribbean	New York	Cape Breton Island	Cork	IJmuiden	Hull	Gate Points
CV1	Edinburgh Inspiring Capital	3	2	3	5	2	3	5	5	4	6	4	5	2	3	1
CV2	Jamaica Lightning Bolt	6	8	6	8	8	9	9	9	6	3	3	9	3	6	5
CV3	Uniquely Singapore	4	3	8	4	4	7	7	2	5	10	7	1	5	4	7
CV4	Cork	8	6	10	1	0	4.6	4.6	4.6	3	1	1	4	1	10	3
CV5	Team Finland	10	10	9	10	7	1	8.3	7	7	4	5	10	10	2	5
CV6	Qingdao	2	5	4	6	3	8	8	8	2	8	2	8	4	5	1
CV7	Cape Breton Island	7	7	2	7	10	5	10	6	8	9	8	2	8	7	8
CV8	Hull & Humber	5	4	7	7	5	4	6	4	9	7	10	7	9	9	5
CV9	Spirit of Australia	9	9	5	9	9	10	10	10	10	5	9	6	7	8	12
CV10	California	1	1	1	3	6	6	1	3	1	2	6	3	6	1	1

Clipper 09–10 Results
Position	Boat	Skipper	Points
1	Spirit of Australia	Brendan Hall	128
2	Team Finland	Eero Lehtinen / Rob McInally	105.3
3	Cape Breton Island	Jan Ridd	104
4	Hull & Humber	Piers Dudin / Justin Taylor	98
5	Jamaica Lightning Bolt	Pete Stirling	98
6	Uniquely Singapore	Jim Dobie	76
7	Qingdao	Chris Stanmore-Major	74
8	Cork	Richie Fearon / Hannah Jenner	56.8
9	Edinburgh Inspiring Capital	Matt Pike	53
10	California	Pete Rollason	42

== Clipper 2011-12 Race ==
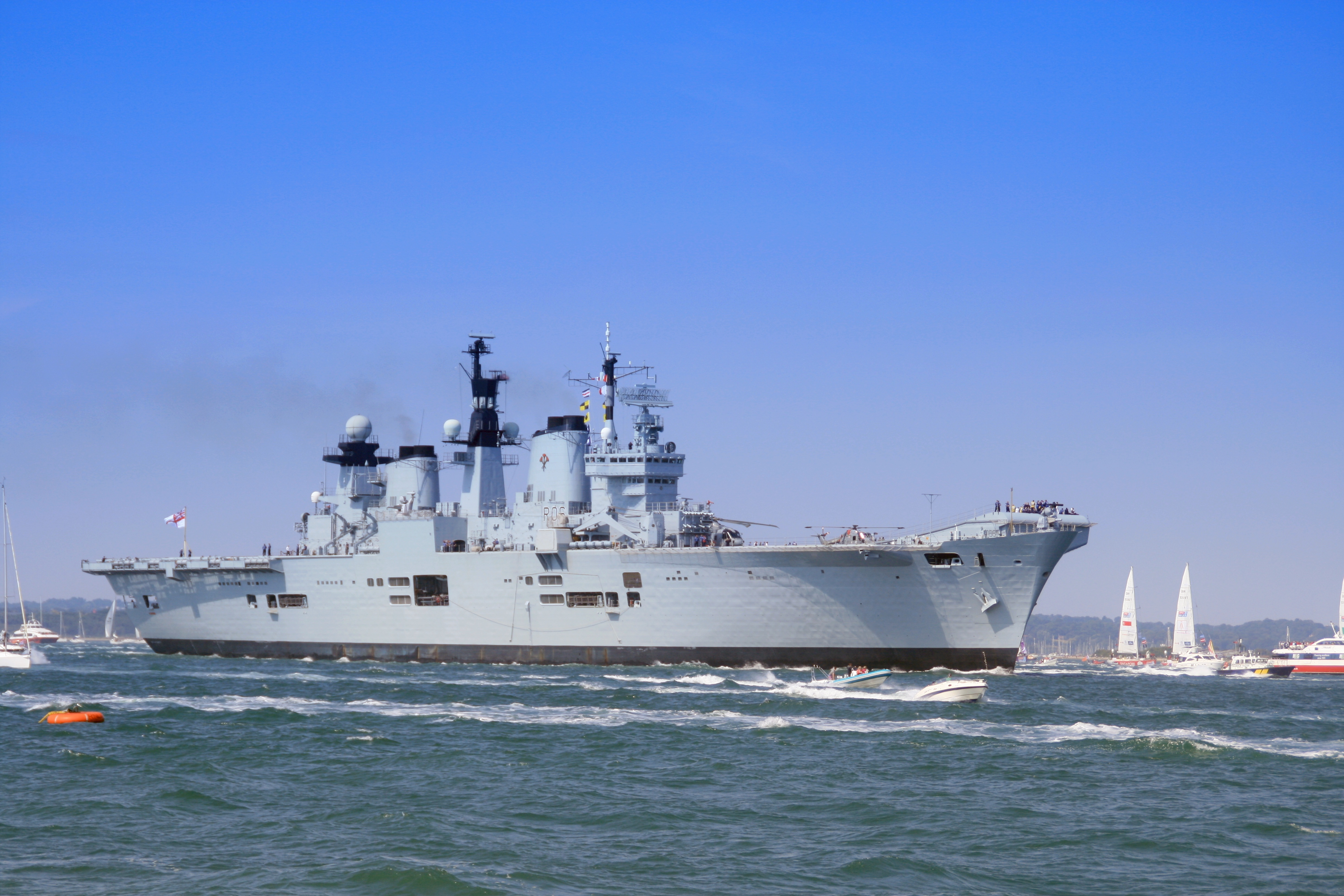
Aircraft carrier HMS Illustrious leading the contestants in the 2011-12 race down Southampton Water to the start line off Cowes, IoW, 31 July 2011, as seen from Calshot Spit.

The fleet departed from Ocean Village on 31 July 2011 and the race started in the Solent. The race lasted a full year and covered an estimated 40,000 nautical miles (74,000 km).

=== Fleet ===
In this edition of the race the fleet included a newly built Clipper 68 to replace the yacht lost at sea. The race saw several yachts suffering steering gear failures, the most severe causing Singapore to retire during the leg to New Zealand. During race 9 from Qingdao to California, an incident on the Geraldton Western Australia yacht made international headlines when the US Coastguard Cutter Bertholf rescued two of the four injured crew from the yacht.

=== Route ===
The route was again modified with yachts visiting Eastern Australia and New Zealand for the first time before sailing up to Singapore.

=== Results ===
Scoring gates and stealth mode were again features of the 11-12 race.

Clipper 11-12 Leg Results
	Start	Southampton	Madeira	Rio de Janeiro	Cape Town	Western Australia	New Zealand	Eastern Australia	Singapore	Qingdao	California	Panama	New York	Nova Scotia	Londonderry	Netherlands	Gate Points
	End	Madeira	Rio de Janeiro	Cape Town	Western Australia	New Zealand	Eastern Australia	Singapore	Qingdao	California	Panama	New York	Nova Scotia	Londonderry	Netherlands	UK	
CV2	New York	8	7	3	8	8 (-2)	3 (-1)	4	4	8 (-2)	3	3	5	4	7	4	3
CV3	Welcome to Yorkshire	5	9	4	4	4 (-2)	7 (-1)	2	2	6 (-1)	9	4	8	8	3	5	10
CV5	Gold Coast Australia	10	10	10	10 (-5)	10 (-2)	9	10	8 (-2)	10 (-5)	10	10	10	10	8	10	20
CV6	Geraldton Western Australia	2	4	2	6	5	2	8	9	1 (-1)	5	7	4 (-3)	7	5	6	8
CV8	De Lage Landen	4	3	8	9	6 (-1)	8	5	10	4	7	8	3	3	4	8	10
CV10	Derry-Londonderry	7	1	6	3	7 (-1)	1	9	5 (-1)	7 (-2)	6	1	1	2	1	7	2
CV1	Edinburgh Inspiring Capital	1	2	1	2	3 (-1)	4	1	3	3 (-1)	1	6 (-2)	7	5	2	2	1
CV7	Uniquely Singapore	6	8	7	1	1	6	6	7	9	4	5 (-1)	6	9	10	9	8
CV9	Qingdao	3	5	5	5	2	5	7	1	5	2	2	2	1	6	3	4
CV11	Visit Finland	9	6	9	7	9 (-2)	10	3	6 (-1)	2	8	9	9	6	9	1	3

Clipper 11-12 Results
Position	Boat	Skipper	Points
1	Gold Coast Australia	Richard Hewson	151
2	Visit Finland	Oli Osborne	103
3	Singapore	Ben Bowley	101
4	De Lage Landen	Mat Booth / Stuart Jackson	99
5	Welcome to Yorkshire	Rupert Dean	86
6	New York	Gareth Glover	77
7	Geraldton Western Australia	Juan Coetzer	77
8	Derry-Londonderry	Mark Light	62
9	Qingdao	Ian Conchie	58
10	Edinburgh Inspiring Capital	Gordon Reid / Flavio Zamboni / Piers Dudin	40

== Clipper 2013-14 Race ==
=== Fleet ===
For this edition, the fleet was expanded to 12 brand new identical Tony Castro designed Clipper 70 yachts. In a break from tradition, 5 of the yachts are sponsored by companies rather than cities or countries.

=== Route ===
The race set off from London's St. Katherine Docks on Sunday 1 September, with the start taking place offshore at Southend the following morning. The fleet then raced to Brest and onwards to Rio de Janeiro, Cape Town, Albany, Sydney, Hobart, Brisbane, Singapore, Qingdao, San Francisco, Panama, Jamaica, New York, Derry/Londonderry, and Den Helder, before finishing back in London.

=== Skippers ===
On 10 April 2013, the skippers for the Clipper 13-14 Round the World Yacht Race were announced as follows:

Clipper 13–14 Skippers
Name	Nationality	Age
Damian Parnham	Australian (East Coast)	48
Pete Stirling	British (Hampshire)	47
Patrick van der Zijden	Dutch (Vogelenzang)	43
Simon Talbot	British (Essex)	43
Gareth Glover	British (Manchester)	36
Chris Hollis	Australian (East Coast)	33
Eric Holden	Canadian (Vancouver)	33
Sean McCarter	Irish (Derry)	31
Vicky Ellis	British (Bristol)	30
Oliver Cotterell	British (Hampshire)	27
Richard Gould	British (Hampshire)	26
Matt Mitchell	British (Berkshire)	26

Clipper 13-14 Results

Placing	Boat No.	Boat name	Skipper
1	CV21	Henri Lloyd	Eric Holden
2	CV26	Great Britain	Simon Talbot
3	CV20	One DLL	Olly Cotterell
4	CV30	Derry Londonderry Doire	Sean McCarter
5	CV24	Switzerland	Vicky Ellis
6	CV29	Old Pulteney	Patrick Van der Zijden
7	CV22	Qingdao	Gareth Glover
8	CV31	Jamaica	Pete Stirling
9	CV28	PSP Logistics	Chris Hollis
10	CV27	Garmin	Damian Parnham/Jan Ridd
11	CV25	Invest Africa	Rich Gould
12	CV23	Mission Performance	Matt Mitchell

== Clipper 2015-16 Race ==
=== Fleet ===
The 2015-16 edition of the race featured the same matched fleet of twelve Clipper 70 yachts as took part in the 2013-14 Race. GREAT Britain, Derry-Londonderry-Doire and Qingdao return as sponsors, with other the sponsors announced during 2015 being (in order of announcement): ClipperTelemed+, Mission Performance, Unicef, IchorCoal, Garmin, Da Nang - Viet Nam, LMAX Exchange, PSP Logistics, and Visit Seattle.

=== Route ===
The 2015-16 edition of the race set sail on Sunday 30 August 2015, once again from London's St Katharine Docks, with the actual start of the first race taking place offshore at Southend at 1230 BST on Monday 31 August. The fleet will race to Rio de Janeiro, Cape Town, Albany, Sydney, Hobart, the Whitsunday Islands, Da Nang, Qingdao, Seattle, Panama, New York, Derry/Londonderry, and Den Helder, before finishing back in London.

=== Skippers ===
On 18 March 2015, the skippers for the Clipper 15-16 Round the World Yacht Race were announced as follows:

Clipper 15–16 Skippers
Hull #	Team	Name	Nationality	Age
CV20	Garmin	Ashley Skett	British (Newquay)	31
CV21	IchorCoal	Darren Ladd	British (Somerset)	49
CV21	IchorCoal	Rich Gould		29
CV22	PSP Logistics	Max Stunell	British (Portsmouth)	34
CV23	Visit Seattle	Huw Fernie	British (Falmouth)	31
CV24	LMAX Exchange	Olivier Cardin	French (Saint Aubin sur Mer)	45
CV25	Da Nang - Viet Nam	Wendy Tuck	Australian (Sydney)	50
CV26	ClipperTelemed+	Diane Reid	Canadian	42
CV26	ClipperTelemed+	Matt Mitchell	British	28
CV27	GREAT Britain	Peter Thornton	British (Gorran Haven)	36
CV28	Qingdao	Igor Gotlibovych	Ukrainian/German	27
CV28	Qingdao	Bob Beggs	British	55
CV29	Derry-Londonderry-Doire	Daniel Smith	British (West Kilbride)	31
CV30	Unicef	Jim Prendergast	British (Sheffield/Gosport)	40
CV30	Unicef	Paul Atwood	British/Australian	60
CV30	Unicef	Martin Clough	British (Lancashire)	58
CV31	Mission Performance	Greg Miller	British (Gosport)	39

=== Results ===
On 29 July 2016, the winners of the Clipper 2015-16 Round the World Yacht Race were announced as follows:

Clipper 2015-16 Results
Placing	Boat No.	Boat name	Skipper	Points
1	CV24	LMAX Exchange	Olivier Cardin	152
2	CV29	Derry-Londerry-Doire	Dan Smith	145
3	CV27	GREAT Britain	Pete Thornton	126
4	CV20	Garmin	Ash Skett	125
5	CV28	Qingdao	Bob Beggs	79
6	CV31	Mission Performance	Greg Miller	78
7	CV25	Da Nang - Viet Nam	Wendy Tuck	77
8	CV23	Visit Seattle	Huw Fernie	76
9	CV26	ClipperTelemed+	Matt Mitchell	74
10	CV30	Unicef	Martin Clough	65
11	CV21	IchorCoal	Rich Gould	54
12	CV22	PSP Logistics	Max Stunell	45

== Clipper 2017-18 Race ==
=== Fleet ===
The 2017-18 edition of the race featured the same matched fleet of twelve Clipper 70 yachts as took part in the 2015-16 Race. CV24, Greenings, retired from the race entirely when it ran aground on October 31, 2017 off the coast of Cape Town.

=== Route ===
The 2017-18 edition of the race set sail on Sunday 20 August 2017, Liverpool’s Albert Dock. This was the fourth time Liverpool has hosted the Clipper race, making it the most frequented Clipper Race stopover port. The fleet raced to Punta del Este, Cape Town, Freemantle, Sydney, Hobart, the Whitsunday Islands, Sanya, Qingdao, Seattle, Panama, New York, Derry/Londonderry, before finishing back in Liverpool on Saturday, July 28, 2018.

=== Results ===
The race was won by Wendy Tuck, who was the first female skipper to win a round the world yacht race. In second place came Nikki Henderson, to date the youngest skipper of the Clipper Round the World Yacht Race.

The results of the Clipper 2017-18 Round the World Yacht Race were announced as follows:

Clipper 2017-18 Results
Placing	Boat No.	Boat name	Skipper	Points
1	CV27	Sanya Serenity Coast	Wendy Tuck	143
2	CV26	Visit Seattle	Nikki Henderson	139
3	CV29	Qingdao	Chris Kobusch	135
4	CV28	PHP Logistics	Matt Mitchell	125
5	CV22	Garmin	Gaetan Thomas	121
6	CV25	Dare To Lead	Dale Smyth	108
7	CV21	Unicef	Bob Beggs	106
8	CV30	Great Britain	David Hartshorn	90
9	CV20	Liverpool 2018	Lance Shepherd	79
10	CV23	Hotelplanner.com	Conall Morrison	69
11	CV31	Nasdaq	Rob Graham	61
12	CV24	Greenings	David Hartshorn	retired

== Clipper 2019-20 Race ==
=== Route ===
The race started at London and continued to Portimao, Punta del Este, Cape Town, Fremantle, Whitsundays and Subic Bay. The COVID-19 pandemic forced the organisers to cancel visits to Chinese ports and suspend the remaining legs. The race resumed in March 2022, when the sailors parted from Subic Bay and travelled to Seattle, Panama, Bermuda, New York, Derry and finally back to London.

=== Results ===
Clipper 2019-20 Results
Placing	Boat	Name	Points
1	CV30	Qingdao	145
2	CV25	Punta del Este	135
3	CV26	Ha Long Bay, Vietnam	127
4	CV23	WTC Logistics	121
5	CV31	Unicef	117
6	CV29	Visit Sanya, China	107
7	CV21	GoToBermuda	104
8	CV20	Imagine Your Korea	79
9	CV28	Zhuhai	74
10	CV22	Seattle	65
11	CV27	Dare To Lead	64

== Clipper 2023-24 Race ==
=== Route ===
- Race 1 (3-9 September): Portsmouth, United Kingdom - Puerto Sherry, Spain
- Race 2 (15 September - 12 October): Puerto Sherry, Spain - Punta del Este, Uruguay
- Race 3 (22 October - 6 November): Punta del Este, Uruguay - Cape Town, South Africa
- Race 4 (16 November - 8 December): Cape Town, South Africa - Fremantle, Australia
- Race 5 (19 December - 1 January): Fremantle, Australia - Newcastle, Australia
- Race 6 (10-16 January): Newcastle, Australia - Whitsunday Islands, Australia
- Race 7 (22 January - 16 February): Whitsundays, Australia - Ha Long Bay, Vietnam
- Race 8 (27 January - 2 March): Ha Long Bay, Vietnam - Zhuhai, China
- Race 9 (9-18 March): Zhuhai, China - Qingdao, China
- Race 10 (25 March - 19 April): Qingdao, China - Seattle, United States
- Race 11 (2-27 May): Seattle, United States - Panama City, Panama
- Race 12 (5-17 June): Panama City, Panama - Washington, D.C., United States
- Race 13 (25 June - 16 July): Washington, D.C., United States - Oban, United Kingdom
- Race 14 (21-27 July): Oban, United Kingdom - Portsmouth, United Kingdom

=== Results ===
Clipper 2023–24 Results
Placing	Boat	Name	Points
1	CV31	Ha Long Bay, Viet Nam	138
2	CV23	Perseverance	137
3	CV25	Zhuhai	134
4	CV28	UNICEF	116
5	CV20	Dare To Lead	107
6	CV27	Qingdao	102
7	CV21	Our Isles and Oceans	98
8	CV26	Yacht Club Punta del Este	90
9	CV29	PSP Logistics	73
10	CV30	Washington DC	53
11	CV22	Bekezela	41
