= 1989–1990 Whitbread Round the World Race =

1989–90 Whitbread Round the World Race
Event title
- Edition: 5th
- Yachts: Multi-class

Competitors
- Competitors: 23

Results
- Winner: Steinlager 2

The 1989–90 Whitbread Round the World Race was run from Southampton to Southampton in 1989–90. It was run with several classes of yacht.

Steinlager 2 skippered by Peter Blake won the race easily. For the first time since 1981–82 (when the race comprised just four legs), the victor won every leg in their division (albeit closely chased by both Grant Dalton's Fisher & Paykel NZ and Pierre Fehlmann's Merit entries). The vast difference in speed and capability of the many different boats involved in the 1989 to 1990 race lead to the creation of a committee to examine the commission of a Whitbread class boat for use in future races. Many of the Maxi yachts in this year's race were nearly twice the size (LOA) of the smallest, and carried well over twice the sail area. The net result of this was that many of the smaller boats finished the longer legs more than ten days after the leg winner. In the overall results, the last finisher was some 52 days behind Blake's Steinlager 2 128-day aggregate time. In addition, the cost of the big yachts was becoming too expensive to fund - even for the well sponsored teams like Steinlager, Rothmans and Merit. Eventually, the new class would be called the Whitbread 60.

The race included the first all-woman crew on Tracy Edwards's yacht Maiden. Although a much smaller boat than many of those taking part, Maiden achieved two leg victories in Division D. Edwards was named yachtsman of the year and appointed MBE. In 2018 a documentary was made about the team's participation in the race. Another unique entry was Fazisi, the first and only global racing yacht entered by the Soviet Union.

== Route ==
Race route

Event	Start date	Start	Finish	Distance (nmi)	Winner
Leg 1	2 September 1989	(United Kingdom) Southampton	(Uruguay) Punta del Este	5,938	Steinlager 2
Leg 2	28 October 1989	(Uruguay) Punta del Este	(Australia) Fremantle	7,260	Steinlager 2
Leg 3	23 December 1989	(Australia) Fremantle	(New Zealand) Auckland	3,272	Steinlager 2
Leg 4	4 February 1990	(New Zealand) Auckland	(Uruguay) Punta del Este	6,255	Steinlager 2
Leg 5	17 March 1990	(Uruguay) Punta del Este	(United States) Fort Lauderdale	5,475	Steinlager 2
Leg 6	5 May 1990	(United States) Fort Lauderdale	(United Kingdom) Southampton	3,818	Steinlager 2

== Results ==
Pos	Class	Class Pos	Sail Number	Yacht	Country	Yacht Type	LOA (Metres)	Skipper	Elapsed Time d:hh:mm:ss
1	A	1	KZ 2	Steinlager 2	New Zealand	Farr 84 Ketch Maxi	25.60	Peter Blake	128:09:40:30
2	A	2	KZ 400	Fisher & Paykel	New Zealand	Farr 82 Ketch Maxi	25.30	Grant Dalton	129:21:18:22
3	A	3	Z 3333	Merit	Switzerland	Farr 81 Sloop Maxi	24.60	Pierre Fehlmann	130:10:10:14
4	A	4	K 100	Rothmans	(United Kingdom) Great Britain	Humphreys 81 Sloop Maxi	24.54	Lawrie Smith	131:04:54:23
5	A	5	US 42624	The Card	Sweden	Farr 79 Ketch Maxi	24.17	Roger Nilson	135:07:15:43
6	A	6	F 8992	Charles Jourdan	France	Ribadeau Dumas 72 Sloop Maxi	21.95	Max-Philippe Couteau; Alain Gabbay	136:15:14:51
7	A	7	E 1992	Fortuna Extra Lights	Spain	Visiers 77 Sloop Maxi	23.47	Jan Santana	137:08:14:11
8	A	8	I 11441	Gatorade	Italy	Farr 80 Sloop Maxi	24.38	Giorgio Falck	138:14:30:12
9	A	9	L 8008	Union Bank of Finland	Finland	Joubert-Nivelt 82 Sloop Maxi	24.99	Ludde Ingvall	138:16:38:12
10	A	10	L 8009	Belmont Finland II	Finland	Farr 80 Sloop Maxi	24.29	Harry Harkimo	139:04:31:13
11	A	11	SR 1989	Fazisi	Soviet Union	Murnikov-Design Group VTK 82 Sloop Maxi	24.99	Alexei Greschenko; Skip Novak	139:09:01:04
12	A	12	IR 1992	NCB Ireland	(Republic of Ireland) Ireland	Holland 81 Sloop Maxi	24.69	Joe English	139:19:22:38
13	A	13	K 303	Satquote British Defender	(United Kingdom) Great Britain	Francis-Faroux 81 Sloop Maxi	24.69	Colin Watkins	143:12:42:23
14	C	1	H 400	Equity and Law II	Netherlands	Judel Vrolijk 63 Sloop	19.11	Dirk Nauta	148:23:50:33
15	A	14	K 1996	Liverpool Enterprise	(United Kingdom) Great Britain	Farr 80 Sloop Maxi	24.38	Bob Salmon	151:04:52:22
16	Cruiser	1	K 808	Creighton's Naturally	(United Kingdom) Great Britain	Williams-Peterson Ocean 80 Sloop Maxi	24.54	John Chittenden	162:06:34:58
17	D	1	F 1789	L'Esprit de Liberté	France	Briand 58 Sloop	17.58	Patrick Tabarly	164:21:36:16
18	D	2	K 1418	Maiden	(United Kingdom) Great Britain	Farr 58 Sloop	17.75	Tracy Edwards	167:03:06:53
19	D	3	G 944	Schlüssel von Bremen	West Germany	Judel Vrolijk Baltic 63 Sloop	19.20	Rolf Renken; Harm Müller-Röhlck	167:19:07:34
20	Cruiser	2	K 3566	With Integrity	(United Kingdom) Great Britain	Gurney 77 Sloop Maxi	23.52	Andrew Coghill	170:16:19:07
21	D	4	F 9302	La Poste	France	Frers First 51 Beneteau Sloop	15.54	Daniel Mallé	181:22:56:17
DNF	D	5	B 763	Rucanor Sport	Belgium	Ribadeau Dumas 58 Sloop	17.63	Bruno Dubois	Retired-Leg 4
DNF	A	15	L 9000	Martela O.F.	Finland	Frers 81 Sloop Maxi	24.60	Markku Wiikeri	Retired-Leg 4

Alexei Grischenko, co-skipper of Fazisi, committed suicide during the first stopover in Uruguay.

The boat Creighton's Naturally suffered a serious broach on leg 2, at about 3 am. Crew members Anthony (Tony) Philips and Bart van den Dwey were swept over board. They were both pulled back on deck. Van den Dwey successfully resuscitated, but, after three hours of trying, crewmembers were unable to revive Philips. A few days later, by radio agreement with relatives ashore, Philips was buried at sea.

Martela OF lost its keel and capsized 350 nautical miles from the finish of leg 4. The unharmed crew was picked up from the overturned hull by Charles Jourdan and Merit. Union Bank of Finland also broke off the race to participate in the rescue.
