= Joey Allen =

New Zealand sailor

Joey Allen is a New Zealand sailor who competed in multiple America's Cups.

Born in Te Awamutu, Allen sailed in the 1981–82 Whitbread Round the World Race on the winner, Flyer II.

In 1984 Allen finished second in the 470 World Championships alongside Chris Dickson. He crewed boats that won the ISAF Open Match Racing World Championship in 1988 and 1990. He sailed on Yamaha in the 1993–94 Whitbread Round the World Race.

He then joined Team New Zealand and was the bowman on NZL 32 when it won the 1995 America's Cup.

Allen was part of Team New Zealand's successful defence at the 2000 America's Cup.

He then became a coach and was with the team for their 2003 and 2007 America's Cup campaigns. He joined Oracle Racing for their 2010 America's Cup campaign, before returning to coach Team New Zealand at the 2013 America's Cup.
