= Drum (yacht) =

UK racing yacht

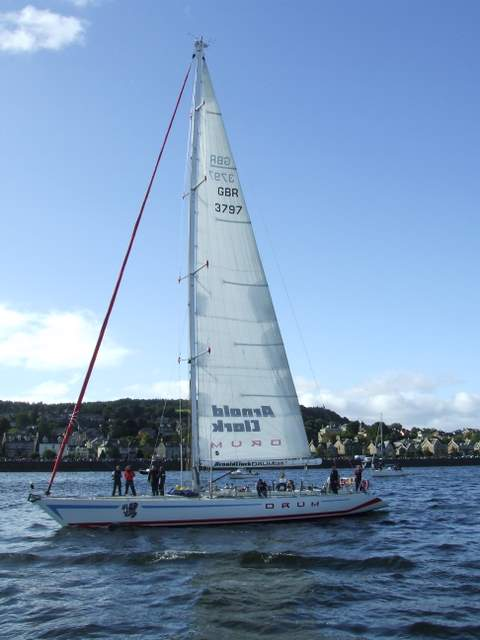
- Drum in Arnold Clark livery, off Greenock in the Firth of Clyde (2008)
- Nation: United Kingdom
- Class: Maxi
- Designer(s): Ron Holland
- Owner(s): Mitsubishi Motors; Simon Le Bon, & Paul & Michael Berrow; Sir Arnold Clark

Racing career
- Skippers: Skip Novak

Drum is a maxi yacht owned by Scottish car sales group Arnold Clark Automobiles, formerly co-owned by lead singer of Duran Duran Simon Le Bon who was rescued from the vessel while competing in 1985 Fastnet Race.

== Design ==
The yacht that became Drum was designed by boat designer Ron Holland and commissioned by Rob James to be sailed in the Whitbread Round the World Race with Mitsubishi both sponsoring and setting up Mitsubishi Marine to build the yacht, originally to be named Colt Cars. However Rob James drowned in a sailing accident on 22 March 1983 – prior to any construction starting.

Then, with Jeff Houlgrave (Rob James's second in command) as the new skipper, the project got under way to the stage of finishing the hull and deck as separate units in Plymouth, Devon – before Mitsubishi pulled the sponsorship (unknown reason).

Rob Lipsett, who had been in charge of building it at Mitsubishi, then set up Vision Yachts in the Isle Of Wight – taking part of the team with him – and after Simon Le Bon and the Berrow brothers bought it, completed the build.

== Career ==
=== Fastnet, 1985 ===
Drum competed in the 1985 Fastnet Race. It was one of the favourites to win the race, but the boat lost its keel because the keel supplier failed to heat treat the structure holding the keel to the yacht as specified by the designer, a necessary step after welding aluminium. When the structure failed, Drum capsized. Its crew were all rescued. Le Bon had not insured the vessel.

=== 1985–86 Whitbread ===
Drum was re-fitted and competed in the 1985–86 Whitbread Round the World Race, finishing in 3rd place on elapsed time – with a 50-minute documentary released on video in 1987; "Drum – An Extraordinary Adventure" (UK)/"Drum – The Journey Of A Lifetime" (USA).

=== Fastnet, 2005 ===
20 years after the original race Drum competed in the 2005 Fastnet Race with most of the surviving members of the original crew, however the yacht was becalmed & did not finish; with Simon Le Bon having to be airlifted off the yacht by helicopter for him to fly to Japan on 12 August for a scheduled Duran Duran performance at the Summer Sonic Festival, Tokyo on the 13th. The reunion was the subject of a 62-minute documentary "Drum – Unfinished Business" by Jacaranda Films; which, along with DVD-Rs for internal use within Arnold Clark, had a limited direct to consumer official DVD release.

== Current status ==
Drum was purchased by Scottish businessman Arnold Clark in the late 1980s. In 1988 Drum was again accorded media attention when it was involved in a collision with a Royal Navy submarine, around 5 miles off the Mull of Kintyre.
