= Ocean Globe Race =

Race to celebrate 50 years of the Whitbread Round the World

Ocean Globe Race 2023
Event title
- Name: Ocean Globe Race 2023

Event details
- Start location: Southampton
- Finish location: Cowes
- Course: Southampton–Cape Town–Auckland–Punta del Este–Cowes
- Key people: Don McIntyre – founder & race director

Competitors
- Competitors: 14
- Competing nations: 8

The Ocean Globe Race was the 50th-anniversary celebration of the original Whitbread Round the World Race, the first fully crewed round-the-world race in 1973. It was founded by Australian adventurer and circumnavigator, Don McIntyre. Except for safety equipment, no modern technology was allowed. The Ocean Globe Race set sail with 14 teams on September 10, 2023, from Ocean Village in Southampton (UK), to circumnavigate the globe with 3 stopovers: Cape Town (South Africa), Auckland (New Zealand), and rounding Cape Horn, Punta del Este (Uruguay), before returning to Cowes (UK) in April 2024. It was won by Maiden, a boat that had taken part in the 1989–1990 Whitbread Round the World Race with an (unprecedented at that time) all-female crew.

== Rules ==
Each crew was to consist of at least 70% non-professional sailors, one woman and one sailor under 24 years old. For this reason, the OGR was defined as a global adventure for ordinary sailors on standard yachts. A distinctive feature of the OGR was the limited use of modern technology on board: computers, satellites, GPS, and high-tech materials were prohibited. Teams navigated using sextants and received weather forecasts through radio fax. The OGR was considered a testament to human endeavor, emphasizing team spirit and sheer determination.

== Entrants ==
At the start, the fleet consisted of 14 teams from France, Italy, Spain, Finland, the UK, the US, South Africa, and Australia. There was an approximate 30% quota of female sailors. The entrants were:

- in the Flyer class: Translated 9 (Italy), Pen Duick VI (France), Maiden (UK), L'Esprit d'équipe (France), Neptune (France),
- in the Sayula class: Evrika (France), Spirit of Helsinki (Finland), White Shadow (Spain), Explorer (Australia), and
- in the Adventure class: Triana (France), Outlaw (Australia), Sterna (South Africa), Godspeed (USA), Galiana WithSecure (Finland).

== Results ==
The main prize was the Ocean Globe Race Winners perpetual IRC Trophy awarded to the yacht with the lowest International Rating Certificate (IRC) corrected sailing time. Other prizes were the IRC prizes per class (Flyer, Sayula and Adventure), the Line Honours prize per leg (first boat without considering handicap) and the Spirit of the OGR prize, attributed to the most deserving entrant across the fleet.

Maiden clinched the ultimate victory, claiming the top spot in the IRC standings and making history as the first all-female crew to triumph in a round-the-world sailing competition. The skipper was Heather Thomas. Maiden had taken part in the 1989–1990 Whitbread Round the World Race with an (unprecedented at that time) all-female crew.

By winning leg 1 and leg 2, Translated 9 was the yacht that won more legs. Translated 9 was co-skippered by Marco Trombetti (also shipowner), Vittorio Malingri, Simon Curwen, and Nico Malingri. Translated 9 was leading leg 3 when it retired due to a crack on the hull, but managed to repair it and join the fourth leg. After taking the lead in leg 4 they again retired due to the hull problem. Triana, the French boat skippered by the entrepreneur and sailor Jean d'Arthuys won the 3rd leg. Leg 4 was won by Pen Duick VI skippered by Marie Tabarly.

=== Line honours ===
Line honours (real-time) rewards the fastest boat in the fleet for each leg without considering the different shapes of the yachts. Leg 1 was won by Spirit of Helsinki, skippered by Jussi Paavoseppä. Leg 2 was won by Translated 9, co-skippered by Marco Trombetti and Vittorio Malingri. Leg 3 and Leg 4 was won by Pen Duick VI, skippered by Marie Tabarly.
