= Flyer II =

Flyer II may refer to:

- Flyer II (yacht), the yacht with which the Dutch skipper Conny van Rietschoten won the 1981–82 Whitbread Round the World Race, which was his second win in the race
- Ravine Flyer II, a hybrid wooden roller coaster located at Waldameer Park in Erie, Pennsylvania, United States
- Wright Flyer II, the second powered aircraft built by Wilbur and Orville Wright in 1904
