= Onne van der Wal =

Dutch marine photographer

- Born: Netherlands
- Occupations: Author; Marine photographer; Sailor
- Known for: photography
- Website: vanderwal.com

Onne van der Wal is a Dutch marine photographer and writer.

Onne van der Wal Photography Gallery is named after him.

== Early life and career ==
Born in the Netherlands, Onne van der Wal relocated to South Africa with his family as a toddler in 1959. He lived in the then apartheid-governed country until he completed his education in 1979. He is trained as a machinist.

His career began in sailing, but after a pivotal encounter with a Sail Magazine editor in 1981. He was on board Flyer II which won the 1981–1982 Whitbread Round the World Race.

In 1980, van der Wal visited Newport, Rhode Island with a friend and decided to settle there by 1985.

Following an initial stint in the marine trade, he pivoted towards professional photography, encouraged by fellow sailor, Jim Adams. In 1987, he founded Onne van der Wal Photography, establishing his first Newport gallery in the early 2000s, later relocating to Banister's Wharf. His business includes conducting photography workshops with plans for future international expeditions.

In 2013, van der Wal published Sailing, a book comprising sailing photographs. A later work, Nautical Newport, contained curated images exclusive to Newport.

== Personal life ==
Onne van der Wal lives in Jamestown, Rhode Island with his wife, Tenley, and three children.

== Award ==
- Photographic Society of America Award (2013)

== Bibliography ==
- van der Wal, Onne (14 May 2004). Wind and Water: Boating Photographs From Around The World. Bulfinch. ISBN 9780821228449.
- van der Wal, Onne; Jobson, Gary (29 October 2013). Sailing. Rizzoli. ISBN 9780847838844.
- van der Wal, Onne; McCormick, Herb (22 October 2019). Sailing America. Rizzoli. ISBN 9780847863587.
