= Maiden (yacht) =

58 foot (18 m) aluminium ocean racing yacht

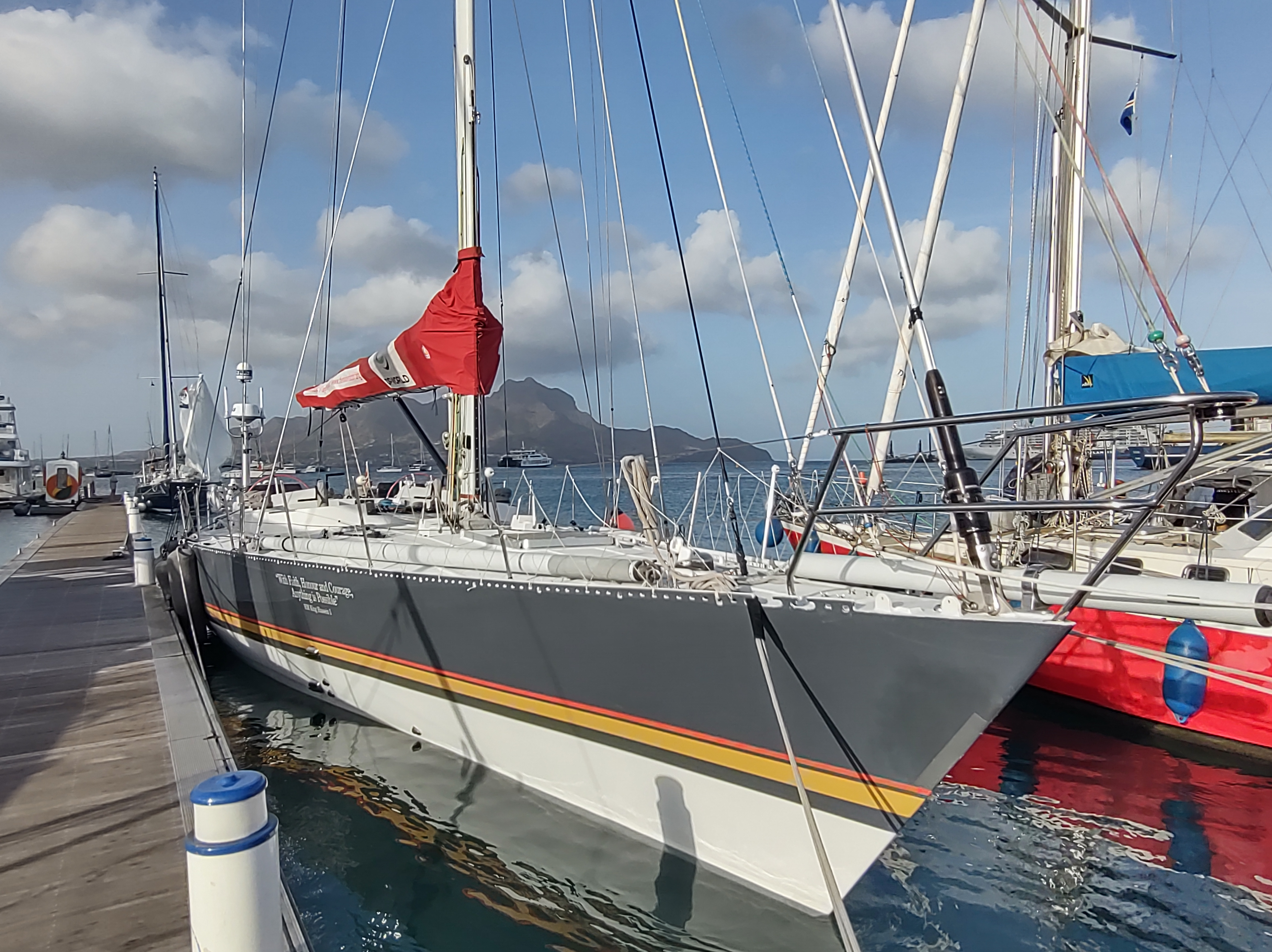
- Maiden in Mindelo, Cape Verde, 2022
- Other names: Disque D'Or 3 Stabilo Boss; Prestige
- Nation: United Kingdom
- Designer(s): Bruce Farr
- Launched: 1979

Racing career
- Skippers: Pierre Fehlmann, Bertie Reed, Tracy Edwards

Specifications
- Type: Single-hull (aluminium)
- Displacement: 21.773 tonnes
- Length: 58 feet (18 m)
- Beam: 16 feet (4.9 m)
- Draft: 10 feet (3.0 m)
- Mast height: 75 feet (23 m)
- Sail area: Bermuda rig
- Crew: 1 to 12

Maiden is a 58 foot (18 m) aluminium ocean racing yacht built in 1979, designed by Bruce Farr and raced by Pierre Fehlmann, Bertie Reed, Tracy Edwards and John Bankart. Edwards bought the yacht in 1987 to compete in the 1989–90 Whitbread Round the World Race with an all-female crew. The yacht achieved good results and broke records, leading to Edwards becoming the first female winner of the Yachtsman of the Year Trophy, changing the perception of women in ocean racing.

Edwards sold Maiden after the race; the yacht subsequently had several different owners. The last of these abandoned her in the Seychelles. She was brought back to England by Edwards in 2017 after a fundraising drive. After a major refit, the boat set off on a global voyage in 2018 to raise funds and awareness for girls' education under the foundation "The Maiden Factor". A second world tour began in 2021.

In 2018, a documentary titled Maiden was made about Edwards and the crew competing in the race; its first showing was at the 2018 Toronto International Film Festival.

Finishing in April 2024, Maiden won the 2023 Ocean Globe Race, winning the circumnavigation race with an all-female crew.

== Racing career ==
=== 1979–1987 ===
The 58 foot (18 m) aluminium-hulled racing yacht was commissioned by the Swiss Ocean Racing Club. Designed by Bruce Farr and named Disque D'Or 3 (or Disque D'Or III) in 1979, she came fourth in the 1981–82 Whitbread Round the World Race, skippered by Swiss sailor Pierre Fehlmann. She was renamed Stabilo Boss for the 1986–87 BOC single-handed challenge, and came seventh, skippered by South African Bertie Reed.

=== Whitbread 1989–90 ===
Whitbread race route in 1989-90

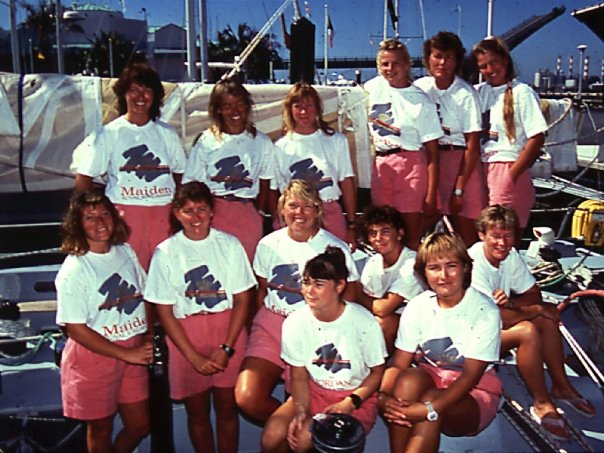
1989 Maiden crew

The boat, then named Prestige, was bought by Tracy Edwards in 1987 with the intention of entering the first all-female Whitbread crew in the 1989–90 Whitbread Round the World Race; in the previous race, only five women had been among the 200 sailors. Edwards remortgaged her house to buy the boat, and was supported by King Hussein of Jordan and sponsorship from Royal Jordanian Airlines. Edwards recruited a 12-woman crew; the boat nearly sank in the River Hamble on the way to the boatyard, but they rebuilt the boat from scratch in 1988. She was christened Maiden by Sarah, Duchess of York. The 1989 Fastnet Race was intended to be a warm-up for Maiden and crew, but was abandoned after the start owing to an injury to crew member Jo Gooding. In the Whitbread race, Maiden finished second in her class (which included Rucanor Sport (BEL), Esprit de Liberté (FRA) and La Poste (FRA)), and was winner in Division D on two out of six individual legs of the race (including the longest leg, the iceberg strewn 7,260 nmi leg in the Southern Ocean), the best finish by a British boat for 17 years. Edwards was awarded the Yachtsman of the Year Trophy, the first woman to receive it, and made an MBE.

The crew (not all for the whole race) were Tracy Edwards (skipper), Mandi Swan (Amanda Swan Neal), Mikaela Von Koskull, Claire Warren, Michele Paret, Tanja Visser, Sally Creaser (not leg 3), Dawn Riley, Nancy Hill, Jeni Mundy, Jo Gooding (from Leg 2), Sarah Davies (leg 3), Kristin Harris (Leg 1) and Angela Farrell.

In the same race was Fazisi, equally unique that year in being the first (and last) global race entrant from the Soviet Union, with a mostly-Soviet crew.

=== After Whitbread ===
Having taken out loans to buy the boat, Edwards sold her after the race. In 1990 Edwards published an account in Maiden, co-authored with Tim Madge. There were several subsequent owners. In 1996/97 she was chartered by Stuart Bowen Davies and skippered by John Bankart and was successfully campaigned in the Hong Kong Round the World yacht Race which was organized by Jimmy Cornell. The last of this series of owners abandoned the yacht in a marina in the Seychelles. The marina seized the boat and offered it to Edwards, who was reunited with the boat after a break of 27 years and was shocked at her condition. Nevertheless, the intention, after fundraising and some restoration work in Cape Town, was to sail her back to England with original crew members and use her for fundraising to promote girls' education under the banner "Maiden Rescue". In the event, the yacht, considered unfit to be sailed, left Cape Town on 26 March 2017 by cargo ship. The shipping was arranged by Peters and May, who had worked with the Maiden team in the Whitbread race.

=== Return to England ===
Maiden arrived in Southampton in April 2017 and the original crew reunited. The yacht was refitted by Hamble Yacht Services in Hamble, near Southampton, in the same shed where she had been refitted in 1988. She was re-rigged by Ocean Yacht Systems, the same firm that had rigged her in the 1980s.

== World Tour 2018–20 ==
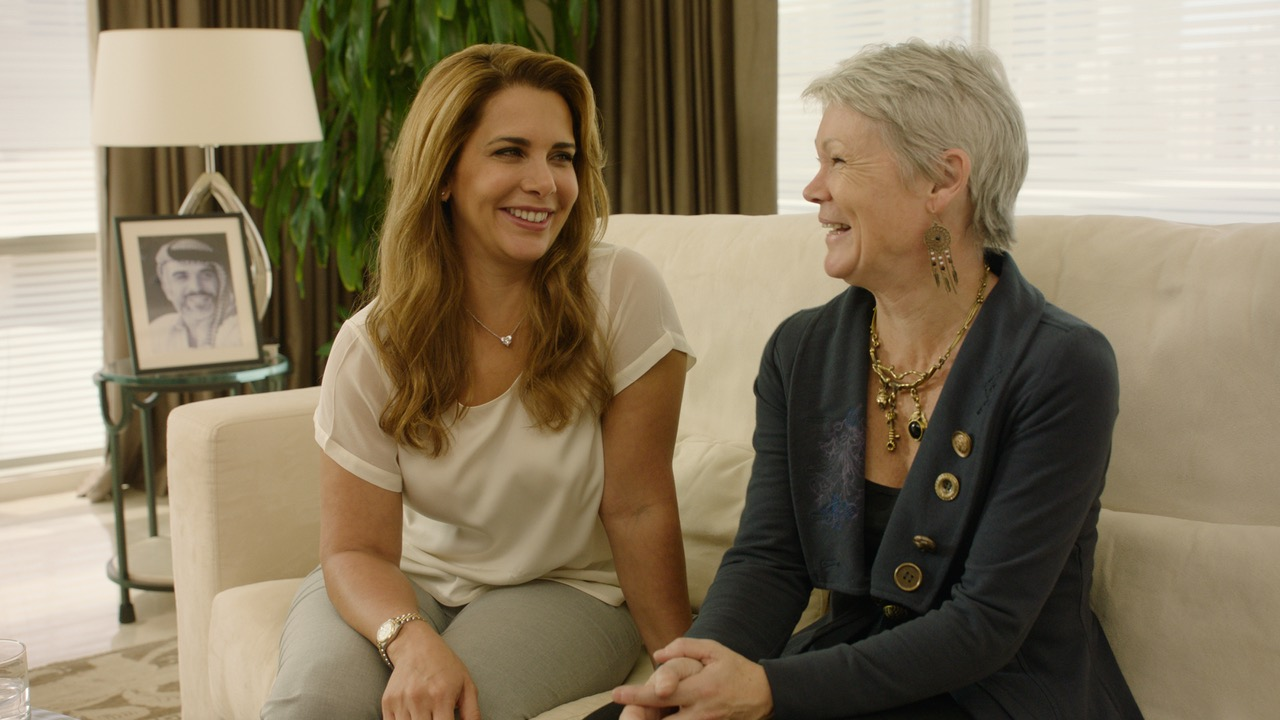
Princess Haya of Jordan (left) with Tracy Edwards, 2017

Maiden was re-launched in the summer of 2018 and in September 2018 departed from Southampton Boat Show with a new crew of women, to prepare for a three-year world tour on behalf of the charity "The Maiden Factor Foundation", which was set up by Edwards with the support of the late King Hussein of Jordan's daughter, Princess Haya. A principal project of the charity is to use Maiden to raise funds and awareness for girls' education globally. The yacht left Hamble in November, and called into Plymouth for repairs. Their first scheduled stop was Kerala, India. They were headed for the Strait of Gibraltar on 26 November. On the voyage, crews and skippers were rotated; among the guest skippers planned were Dee Caffari, Sharon Ferris and Wendy Tuck; the first is Nikki Henderson.

The yacht arrived in Malta on 13 December 2018, and was passing through the Suez Canal in February 2019. Skippered by Wendy Tuck, Maiden reached Auckland, New Zealand, on 1 May 2019.

In November 2019, having crossed the Pacific Ocean via Hawaii to North America, she visited Vancouver, Seattle, San Francisco, Los Angeles and San Diego, all centres for yachting and opportunities for fundraising. She passed through the Panama Canal, skippered by Liz Wardley, bound for Antigua. At each stop-off, hundreds of schoolgirls visited the boat and crew members gave talks in schools. Edwards commented: "We can't keep up with the number of schools that want us. Teachers love it."

== World Tour 2021–22 ==
After a shakedown voyage from Dubai and passing through the Suez Canal, in March 2022 Maiden was in Palma, Majorca, a maintenance stop on the first leg of the new tour, this time for three years, first crossing the Atlantic to Miami, Florida. Numerous other Atlantic stops would see Maiden arrive in Cape Town later in 2022. In partnership with DP World, the Tour sees a resumption of fundraising and an emphasis on education for females, particularly in STEM subjects. In June 2022 she was in Brooklyn and in August was in Newport, Rhode Island.

== 2023 Ocean Globe Race ==
Maiden was in Southampton in September 2023 to take part as the British entry in the 27,000-mile Ocean Globe Race. With an all-female crew, she won the race, making history as the first all-female crew to triumph in a round-the-world sailing competition. The skipper was Heather Thomas.

== See also ==
- List of Volvo Ocean Race sailors
