= 1985–1986 Whitbread Round the World Race =

1985–86 Whitbread Round the World Race
Event title
- Edition: 4th
- Yachts: Multi-class

Competitors
- Competitors: 15

Results
- Winner: L'Esprit d'Équipe

The 1985–86 Whitbread Round the World Race was the fourth edition of the Whitbread Round the World Race (now known as the Ocean Globe Race). Fifteen boats started out from Southampton on 28 September 1985 for the around-the-world race.

L'Esprit d'Équipe, skippered by Lionel Péan, won the race in a corrected time of 111 days 23 hours. Philips Innovator was second, and Swan 651 Fazer Finland third. UBS Switzerland was named first on elapsed time, with Lion New Zealand as runner-up. Drum (carrying its owner, the pop star Simon Le Bon) finished just a breath behind.

== Route ==
Ports visited

Event	Start date	Start	Finish	Distance (nmi)	Winner
Leg 1	28 September 1985	(United Kingdom) Portsmouth	(South Africa) Cape Town	7,350	L'Esprit d'Equipe
Leg 2	4 December 1985	(South Africa) Cape Town	(New Zealand) Auckland	7,300	Philip's Innovator
Leg 3	15 February 1986	(New Zealand) Auckland	(Uruguay) Punta del Este	6,215	L'Esprit d'Equipe
Leg 4	9 April 1986	(Uruguay) Punta del Este	(United Kingdom) Portsmouth	5,875	L'Esprit d'Equipe

== Results ==
Overall Pos	Line Honours Pos	Sail Number	Yacht	Country	Yacht Type	LOA (Metres)	Skipper	Elapsed Time d:hh:mm:ss	Corrected time d:hh:mm:ss
1	7	F 8333	L'Esprit d'Equipe	France	Briand 58 Sloop	17.58	Lionel Péan	132:00:15:19	111:23:09:49
2	5	H 400	Philips Innovator	Netherlands	Judel Vrolijk 63 Sloop	19.11	Dirk Nauta	127:03:00:40	112:21:31:37
3	6	L 71	Fazer Finland	Finland	Frers Swan 651	19.98	Michael Berner	128:05:25:01	115:00:49:10
4	1	Z 3333	UBS Switzerland	Switzerland	Farr 80 Sloop Maxi	24.29	Pierre Fehlmann	117:14:31:42	117:04:47:03
5	10	B 763	Rucanor Tristar	Belgium	Ribadeau Dumas 58 Sloop	17.63	Gustaaf Versluys	139:10:26:21	118:09:29:12
6	8	E 2342	Fortuna Lights	Spain	Visiers 62 Sloop	18.87	Jorge Brufau; Antonio Guiu	137:21:22:56	120:19:06:37
7	2	KZ 5555	Lion New Zealand	New Zealand	Holland 78 Sloop Maxi	23.77	Peter Blake	122:06:31:58	121:07:38:18
8	3	K 3797	Drum	(United Kingdom) Great Britain	Holland 77 Sloop Maxi	23.47	Skip Novak	122:18:54:31	122:06:19:29
9	11	H 3040	Equity and Law	Netherlands	Peterson Baltic 55	16.76	Pleun van der Lugt	145:19:07:38	123:06:43:44
10	4	B 762	Cote d'Or	Belgium	Joubert-Nivelt 82 Sloop Maxi	24.99	Éric Tabarly	126:08:27:33	125:19:01:50
11	12	Z 1941	Shadow of Switzerland	Switzerland	Sparkman & Stephens Swan 57	17.37	Nora & Otto Zehender-Müller	154:14:54:50	128:11:55:19
12	9	K 3566	Norsk Data GB	(United Kingdom) Great Britain	Gurney 77 Sloop Maxi	23.50	Bob Salmon	138:01:15:36	136:01:12:10
13	13	D 1181	SAS Baia Viking	Denmark	Elvstrom-Klerulf 49 Sloop	15.00	Jesper Norsk	170:18:53:29	144:18:54:05
DNF	14	KZ 6000	NZI Enterprise	New Zealand	Farr 80 Sloop Maxi	24.32	Digby Taylor	Retired-Leg 3	
DNF	15	US 33881	Portatan-Atlantic Privateer	United States	Farr 80 Sloop Maxi	24.32	Peter Kuttel	Retired-Leg 1	

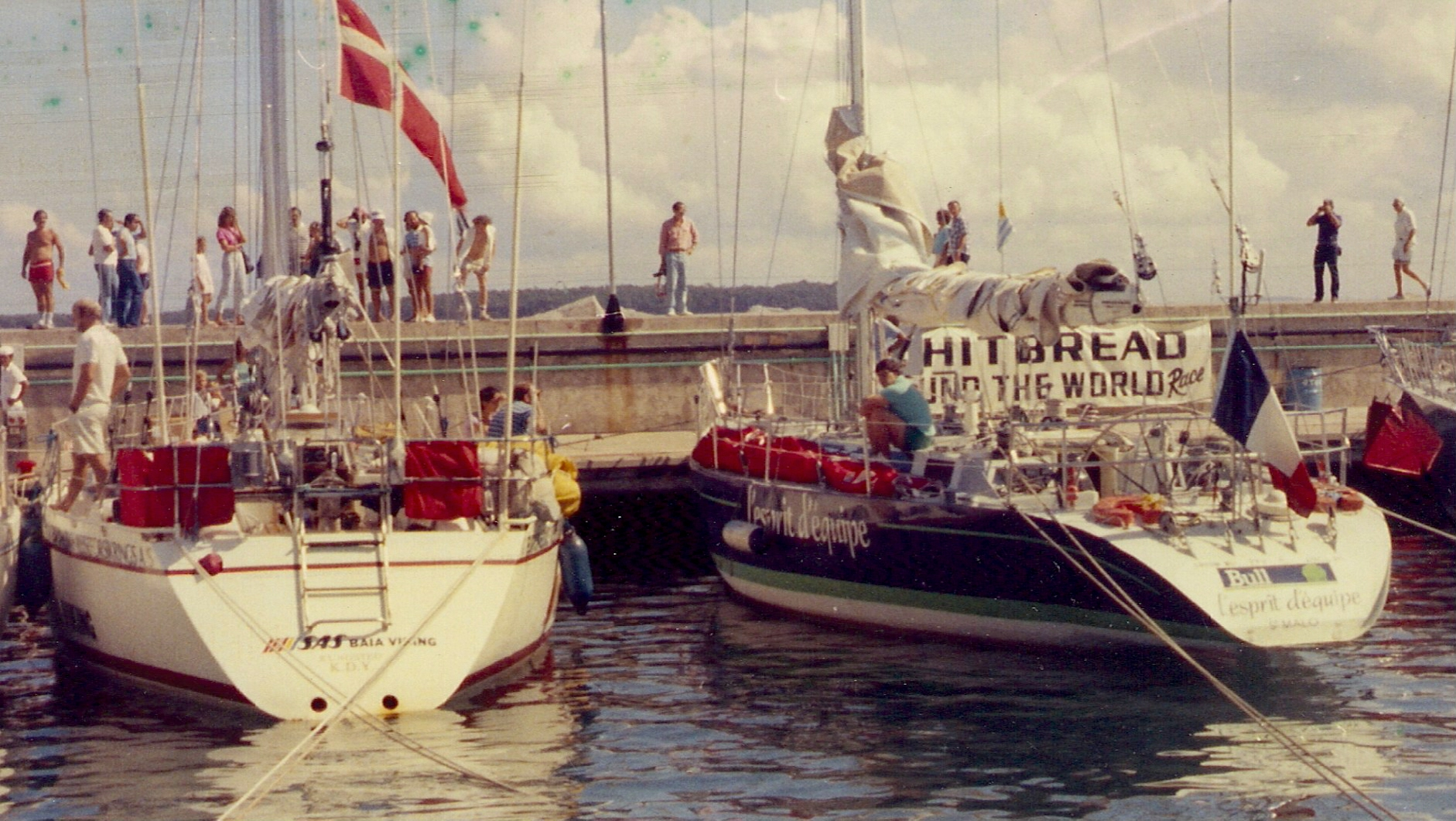
L'Esprit d'équipe and SAS Baia Viking in Punta del Este, 1986.
