= Digby Taylor =

New Zealand sailor

Digby Taylor MBE
Personal information
- Full name: Digby Fergusson Taylor
- Born: 24 October 1941 Auckland, New Zealand
- Died: 18 April 2017 (aged 75) Rotorua, New Zealand

Sport
- Country: New Zealand
- Sport: Sailing
- Events: Whitbread Round the World; Sydney to Hobart; Whangarei to Noumea; Melbourne to Osaka

Digby Fergusson Taylor MBE (24 October 1941 – 18 April 2017) was a New Zealand sailor who skippered yachts in both the 1981–82 and 1985–86 Whitbread Round the World Races.

Taylor built and skippered the 51-foot sloop Outward Bound, designed by Laurie Davidson, which competed in the 1981–82 Whitbread Round the World Race. In that race, Outward Bound won the trophy for best small yacht, and finished fifth overall.

In 1982, Taylor sailed in the Whangarei to Nouméa yacht race, winning handicap honours.

Taylor was awarded the Blue Water Medal for outstanding seamanship by the Royal Akarana Yacht Club in 1982. In the 1983 New Year Honours, he was appointed a Member of the Order of the British Empire, for services to ocean yacht racing.

For the 1985–86 Whitbread, Taylor built and skippered the 80-foot, Bruce Farr-designed, maxi yacht, NZI Enterprise (originally called Enterprise New Zealand). After finishing fourth and second on the first two legs, NZI Enterprise lost her mast 380 nautical miles south-east of the Chatham Islands, and had to withdraw from the race. Taylor later skippered the renamed Castaway Enterprise in the 1986 Sydney to Hobart Yacht Race.

Taylor skippered the 52-foot Castaway Fiji in the inaugural two-handed Melbourne to Osaka yacht race in 1987, with crewman Colin Akhurst. Taylor and Akhurst were both thrown overboard when their yacht hit a submerged object, lost her keel and overturned. Akhurst drowned, but Taylor was rescued 18 hours later, 750 nautical miles north-east of Sydney.

Taylor died in Rotorua on 18 April 2017.
