= Lionel Péan =

French sailor (born 1956)

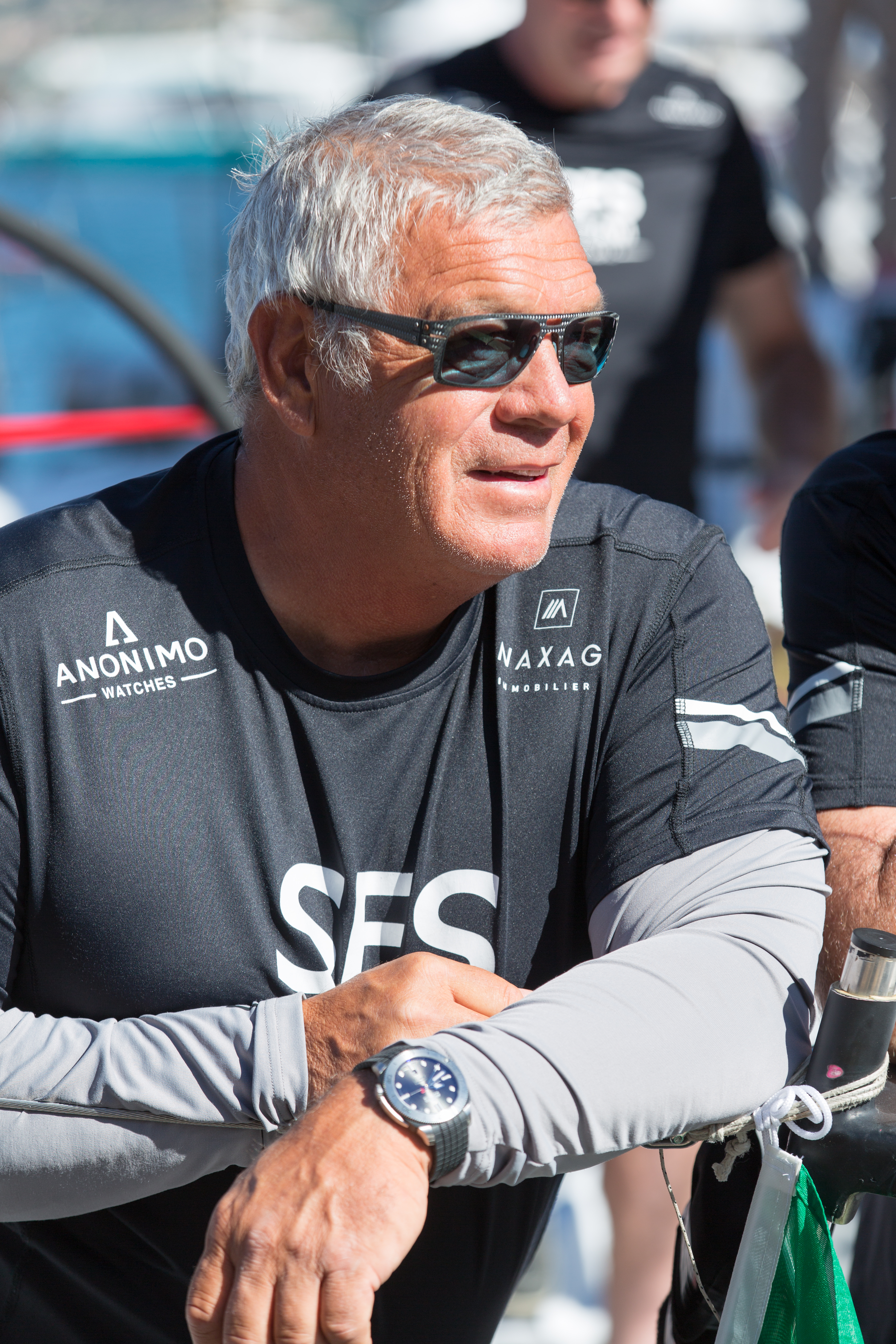
Lionel Péan

Lionel Péan (born 17 September 1956 in Saint-Germain-en-Laye) is a French sailor who won the Whitbread Round the World Race and the 1983 Solitaire du Figaro solo race.

Péan skippered L'Esprit d'équipe in the 1985–86 Whitbread Round the World Race. The boat won three of the four legs and won the race with a corrected time of 111 days 23 hours. At age 29, he was the youngest winning skipper in the race’s history.

He competed in a legends regatta before the 2011–12 Volvo Ocean Race with the same crew, and again won the regatta.
