= Lion New Zealand (sailing yacht) =

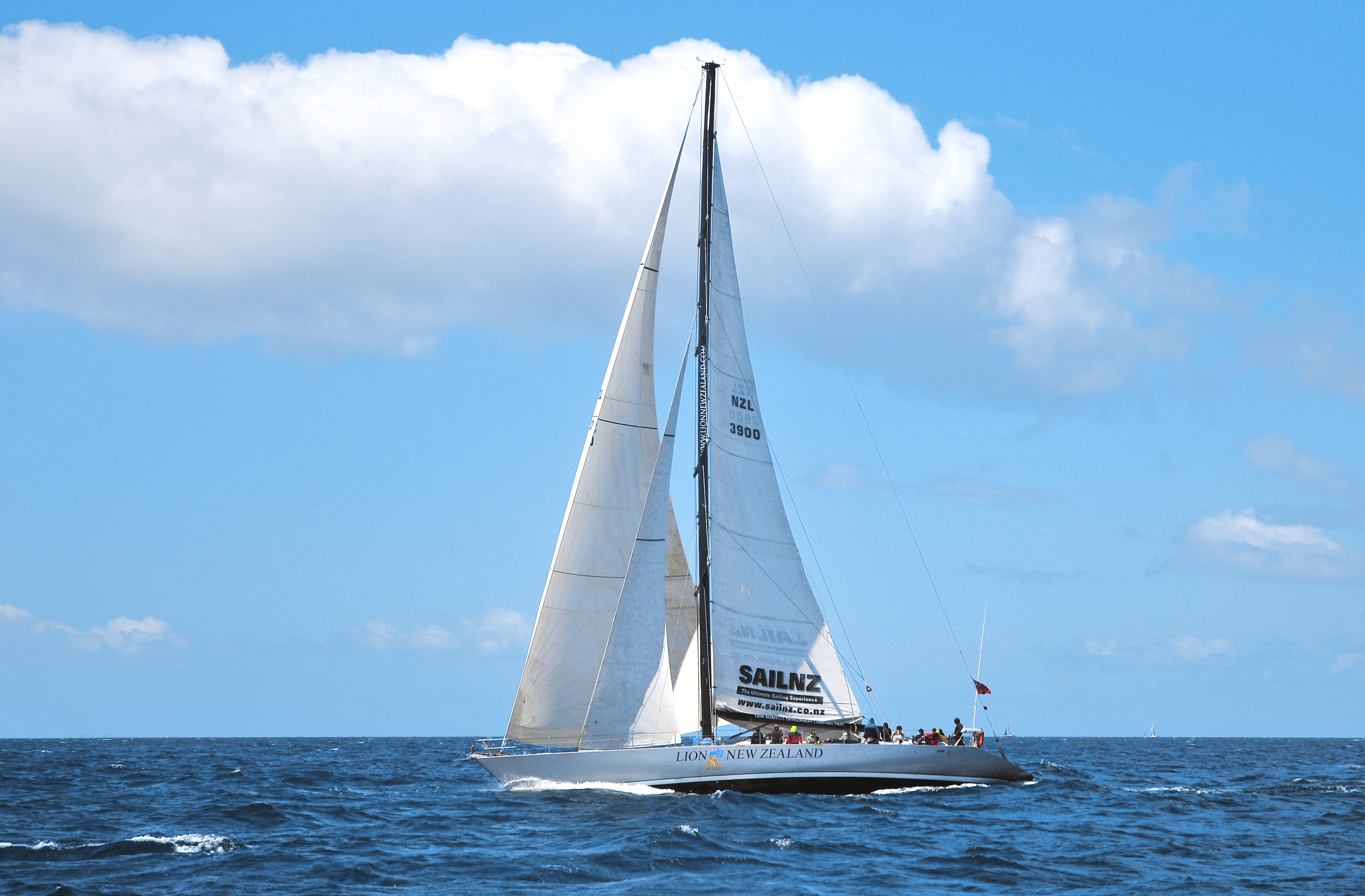
- Lion New Zealand
- Nation: New Zealand
- Sail no: NZL3900
- Designer(s): Ron Holland
- Owner(s): NZ Sailing Trust

Racing career
- Skippers: Sir Peter Blake
- Notable victories: 1984 Sydney-Hobart Yacht Race (line honours)

Specifications
- Type: Maxi
- Length: (LOA) 23.76 m/77.95 ft

Notes
- Nicknamed the "Urban Assault Vehicle"

Lion New Zealand is a former New Zealand racing maxi designed for the 1985-86 Whitbread Round the World Yacht Race and winner (line honours) of the 1984 Sydney to Hobart Yacht Race.

Following the spectacular conditions of the Sydney to Hobart, which the yacht not only survived but also won, the boat was nicknamed the "Urban Assault Vehicle".
