= Colin de Mowbray =

Royal Navy officer

Colin John de Mowbray MBE

Personal details
- Born: 12 April 1945 High Wycombe, Buckinghamshire, England
- Died: 11 July 2010 Lymington, Hampshire, England
- Awards: Member of the Order of the British Empire

Military service
- Allegiance: United Kingdom
- Branch/service: Royal Navy
- Years of service: 1963–1994
- Rank: Lieutenant-Commander
- Commands: 845 Naval Air Squadron
- Battles/wars: Falklands War

Lieutenant-Commander Colin John de Mowbray, MBE (12 April 1945 – 11 July 2010) was a helicopter pilot and veteran of the Falklands War; in retirement he sailed in, and organised, round-the-world yacht races.

== Early life and education ==
De Mowbray was the son of a Royal Navy captain. He attended Stowe School and from September 1963 the Britannia Royal Naval College in Dartmouth, Devon before going to the Royal Naval Air Station in Arbroath.

== Military career ==
In the 1960s he served as a "jungly" in Borneo, flying the Royal Marines of 45 Commando to and from jungle locations that he was advised to "memorise then forget".

In 1976 he attended the staff course at the Royal Naval College, Greenwich.

In the late 1970s served on the British naval staff in Washington, DC.

In 1982 during the Falklands War he was Executive Officer and First-Lieutenant (second in command) of HMS Alacrity.

From 1984 until 85 he commanded 845 Naval Air Squadron.

He was appointed MBE in 1992 and retired from the Navy in 1994.

== Retirement ==
In 1996 De Mowbray was the skipper of Crysolite in the first Clipper Round the World Yacht Race. He went on to become race director from 1998 until 2003, and then operations director, responsible for liaison with sponsor cities and host ports. He continued to work for Clipper Ventures until shortly before his death.

== Clipper Race Yacht Club ==
De Mowbray was the founder and first Commodore of the Clipper Race Yacht Club. He described it as "a logical way to bring some gentle order to this special group of adventurers". On 24 April 2009 the club was officially launched at a ceremony at St Katharine's Dock. The purpose of the club is to create an association of Clipper alumni to the mutual advantage of all parties and for the purpose of having fun. Membership is open to individuals who have completed at least one leg of the Clipper Round the World yacht race, or competed with Clipper in another approved race, or have been associated with Clipper Ventures as a staff member.
