= Maiden (film) =

- Directed by: Alex Holmes
- Screenplay by: Alex Holmes
- Produced by: Victoria Gregory; Alex Holmes
- Cinematography: Chris Openshaw
- Edited by: Katie Bryer
- Music by: Robert Manning; Samuel Sim
- Production company: New Black Films
- Distributed by: Dogwoof
- Release dates: 6 September 2018 (TIFF); 8 March 2019 (United Kingdom)
- Running time: 93 minutes
- Country: United Kingdom
- Language: English
- Box office: $3.5 million

Maiden is a 2018 British documentary written and directed by Alex Holmes about Tracy Edwards and the crew of the ocean-racing yacht Maiden as they compete as the first all-woman crew in the 1989–1990 Whitbread Round the World Race. The film was produced by Victoria Gregory's New Black Films.

== Plot ==
The film begins with Edwards recalling her childhood in England: the death of her father due to a heart attack when she was 10, and her mother's remarriage to an abusive alcoholic who moved the family to Wales. After being expelled from school at the age of 16, Edwards ran away from home and traveled in Europe, ending up in Greece, where she became a stewardess aboard a yacht and learned to sail on her way to the Americas. She became passionate about the Whitbread Round the World Race and met King Hussein of Jordan, who encouraged her to sign on as a cook and the only woman on the crew of a yacht that competed in the 1985-86 race.

After the race, despite widespread skepticism, Edwards announced that she was putting together an all-female crew for the next round-the-world race in 1989-90. The international crew recalls their involvement and their difficulties with getting a sponsor that would provide an essential million pounds of funding. Edwards mortgaged her home to buy a second-hand yacht, renamed her Maiden, and remortgaged the boat to pay for her refitting, which was largely performed by her crew. King Hussein agreed to arrange their sponsorship by Royal Jordanian Airlines. Although their first race, the Fastnet, had to be abandoned after an injury that led to the dismissal of her first mate, Edwards went ahead with the Whitbread, acting as both skipper and navigator.

Maiden finished third in her class on the first leg of the race from England to Uruguay, but on the second and third legs through the turbulent, brutally cold Southern Ocean to Australia and New Zealand, she finished first, winning worldwide attention and praise. However, on the fourth leg back to Uruguay, the yacht began taking on water; required repairs meant that she finished a disappointing third on the fifth leg to Florida. The final leg back to England was plagued by a lack of wind. Maiden placed second in the race but she and her crew were welcomed home to great acclaim, opening the door to many more women in sailing and other sports. The film ends with Edwards winning the Yachtsman of the Year Trophy.

== Release ==
Maiden debuted at the 2018 Toronto International Film Festival and was later released by Sony Pictures Classics in New York and Los Angeles on 28 June 2019.

== Reception ==
Maiden received positive critical reviews. On Rotten Tomatoes, the film has an approval rating of 98% based on 118 reviews, with an average rating of 8.1/10. The website's consensus reads, "Enthralling viewing even for audiences with little to no knowledge of or interest in sailing, Maiden pays powerful tribute to a true pioneer." On Metacritic the film has a score of 82% based on reviews from 25 critics, indicating "Universal acclaim." In The New York Times, Manohla Dargis described it as "a sleek, exhilarating documentary"; in The Wall Street Journal, John Anderson called it "a documentary with all the nervous-making energy of a first-rate drama"; and in Rolling Stone, Peter Travers wrote, "Gender bias gets knocked backwards on its ass in this rousing doc." This Film as well was the Winner of the 2020 Cinema for Peace Women's Empowerment Award.
