= Philips Innovator =

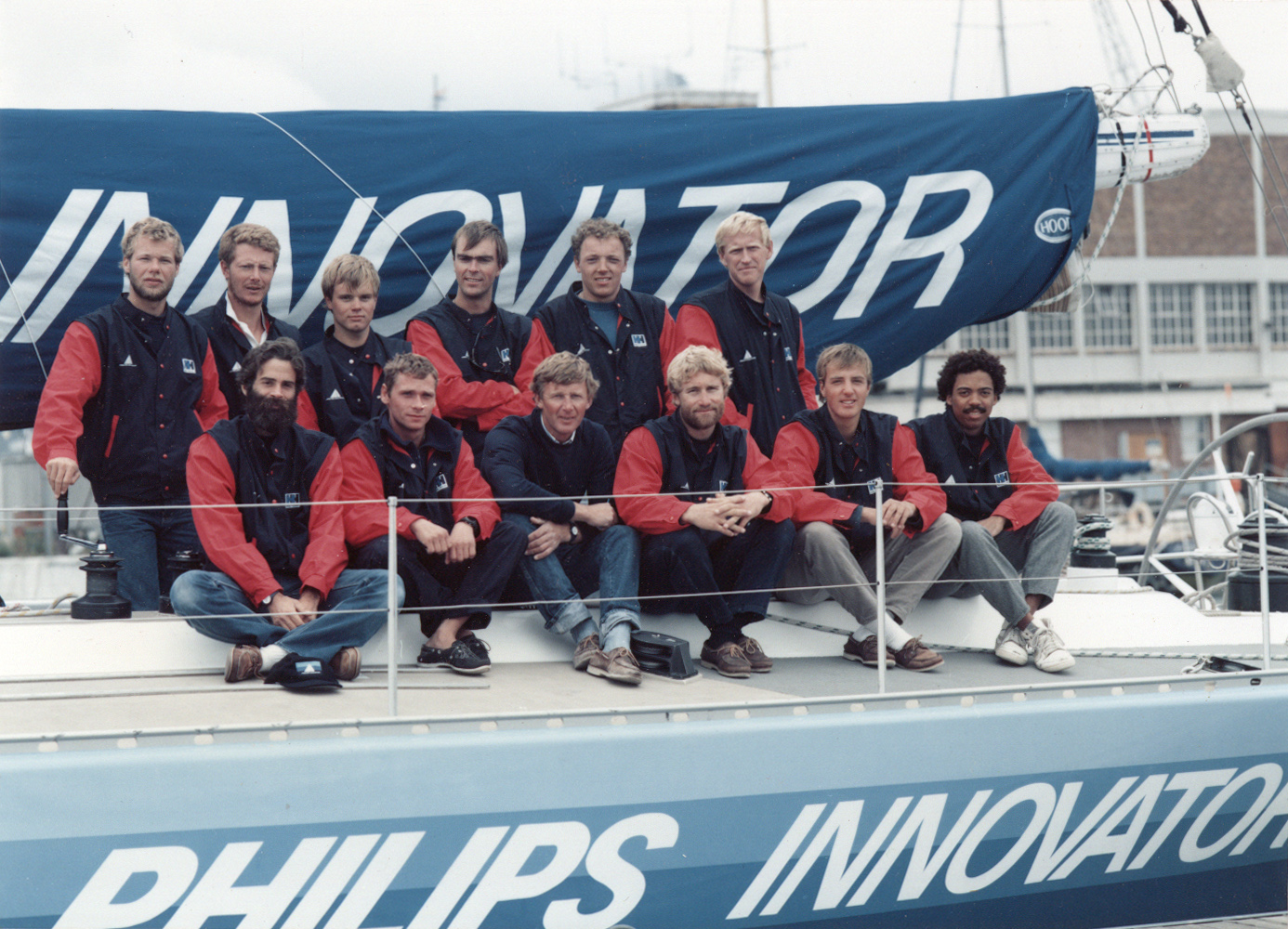
- Philips Innovator during the 1985–86 Whitbread Round the World Race.
- Other names: Equity & Law II
- Nation: Netherlands

Racing career
- Skippers: Dirk Nauta

Specifications
- Length: 63 feet

Philips Innovator (also Equity & Law II) is a 63-foot aluminium racing yacht designed by Rolf Vrolijk and built by Aluboot. She finished second in the 1985–86 Whitbread Round the World Race skippered by Dirk Nauta. After an extensive refit she participated in the 1989-90 Whitbread Round the World Race as Equity and Law II again skippered by Dirk Nauta.
