= Arnold Clark Automobiles =

Car dealership network in the United Kingdom

Arnold Clark Automobiles Limited
- Trade name: Arnold Clark
- Type: Private
- Industry: Automotive
- Founded: 1954; 72 years ago in Glasgow, Scotland
- Founder: Arnold Clark
- Headquarters: Glasgow, Scotland
- Key people: Eddie Hawthorne (CEO and Group Managing Director)
- Products: Vehicles
- Owner: Arnold Clark & Family
- Number of employees: 11,000 (2020)
- Divisions: The Phoenix Car Company
- Subsidiaries: Arnold Clark Finance; Harry Fairbairn
- Website: arnoldclark.com

Arnold Clark Automobiles Limited, trading as Arnold Clark, is a car dealer based in Glasgow, Scotland. As of 2025, the company has over 200 dealerships across the United Kingdom, and is one of the largest car dealerships in Europe. Annually, Arnold Clark sells in excess of 300,000 vehicles, and sells new vehicles from over 30 international countries.

== History ==
=== Founding and early history ===
The company was founded by Arnold Clark, who opened his first showroom in 1954 in Park Road in Glasgow. In 1963, Arnold Clark Finance was launched. In the 1960s the company began rental vehicles and in 1968 took over Grant, Melrose and Tennant giving the company an accident repair centre.

Clark took over other motor businesses such as the Glasgow dealership McHarg, Rennie and Lindsay. Clark's biggest branch was gained through the takeover of Ross of Lochrin in Edinburgh. By 1989, there were twenty two Arnold Clark branches across Central Scotland and one in England. The rental part of the business now had 1400 rental cars and 350 light commercial vehicles. The company also had vehicle contract hire operations in Liverpool and Sheffield. In December 1989, he gained a further 13 dealerships in the North East of Scotland, with the purchase of Ron Hutcheson Motors Ltd. This took the number of people employed by the company to 1300.

=== Expansion ===
In 1994, the company opened its first site in England, in Liverpool. In 1996, Clark agreed deal for site and assets of Glasgow-based H Prosser and Sons Ltd, unaware that the company was imminently to be put into receivership. By May 2002, Arnold Clark had 97 dealerships and with annual sales expected to reach £1 billion, with a claim to be Scotland's largest private company although Grampian Country Foods recorded larger sales for the four years following this.

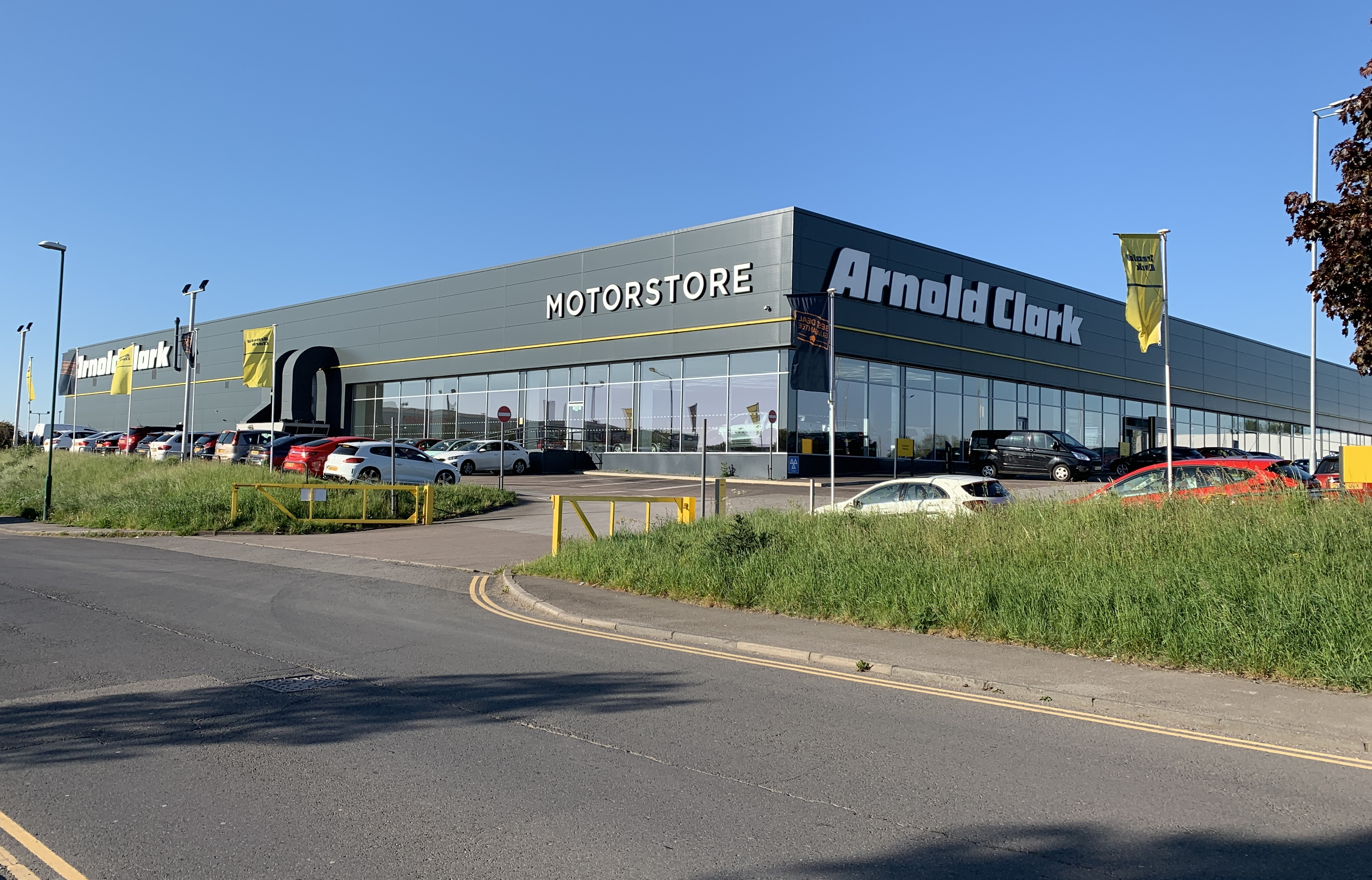
Arnold Clark Motorstore in Nottingham

In December 2003, Arnold Clark acquired the training company GTG. By the end of that year, the company employed 6,000 people and operated more than 120 showrooms across the United Kingdom. In April 2005, the company paid a first dividend to the family trust family that it is co owned by.

In May 2006, the company acquired the BMW and MINI specialist Harry Fairbairn, which had dealerships in Giffnock and Irvine. In August 2006, the company opened a car showroom in the regenerated Glasgow Harbour, Europe's largest. By November 2007, it was approaching a £2 billion turnover. In June 2007, it overtook Grampian Country Foods to again become Scotland's biggest private company.

With the announcement of the Vehicle scrappage scheme in August 2009, Arnold Clark expected to create 700 jobs.

By September 2012, the company was expanding through the acquisition of other dealerships. Fleet sales still accounted for a relatively small proportion of the company's business. The takeover of the Weir group in September 2012 also saw the company expand into the market of Mercedes-Benz. Acquisitions also included a site near Aberdeen, and a dealership and bodyshop in Blackpool.

=== Recent history ===
2014 was their sixtieth year of trading and this was marked with the company’s turnover reaching almost £3 billion, with a rise in used car sales partly responsible. They were involved with the 2014 Commonwealth Games as a partner organisation, helping look after the fleet of official vehicles.

In February 2015, the company undertook a rebranding of their buildings. In 2015, the company took over Ness Motors in Inverness, Elgin and Perth. By September 2016, the company had 200 dealerships and 24 franchises, with a staff of 10,000. Arnold Clark never retired from the company, remaining as chairman until his death on 10 April 2017, at the age of 89.

On 31 January 2019, Arnold Clark completed their takeover of The Phoenix Car Company. Phoenix was a family-run car retail group established in 1993, with dealerships of Kia, Hyundai, Honda, SsangYong and Mazda.

In 2022, in partnership with the FA, the Arnold Clark Cup was founded; an invitational international women’s football tournament hosted in England.

Starting in 2024 Arnold Clark started installing Electric vehicle Charging stations at its dealerships, in with more than 50 installed by late 2025.

== Locations ==
In December 2007, the company's Botanic Gardens Garage was designated a category A listed building. It had been built before 1912. The company had plans to demolish the building but later withdrew their plans, and in April 2014, one planning application was granted to convert it into a gym.

The company has a purpose-built head office in Hillington which houses a dealership of Renault, this was completed in 2016.

== Awards ==
In October 2009, the company won the "Glasgow Business Award" for Apprentice Employer of the Year.

In May 2016, the company's marketing department was named 'In-House Marketing Team of the Year' at The Drum Awards 2016.

In 2022, the company won Dealer Group of the Year as well as Retailer of the Year at the Automotive Management 2022 Awards.
