= Wendy Tuck =

Australian skipper

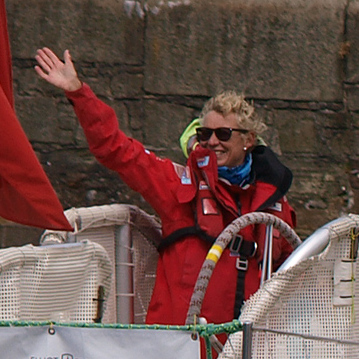
- Born: 1965 (age 60–61)

Wendy Tuck (born c. 1965) is a yachtswoman and previous chief instructor and principal at the Clipper Race training base in Sydney, Australia. She was the first female skipper to win a round-the-world yacht race.

== Sailing achievements ==
Tuck was born in Australia in 1965. Having begun sailing at the age of 24, she has competed in 13 Sydney Hobart Yacht races and was the first woman skipper to finish in 2017, earning the Jane Tate Memorial Trophy. She won her division in 2015 as Skipper of the Clipper Boat Danang Vietnam.

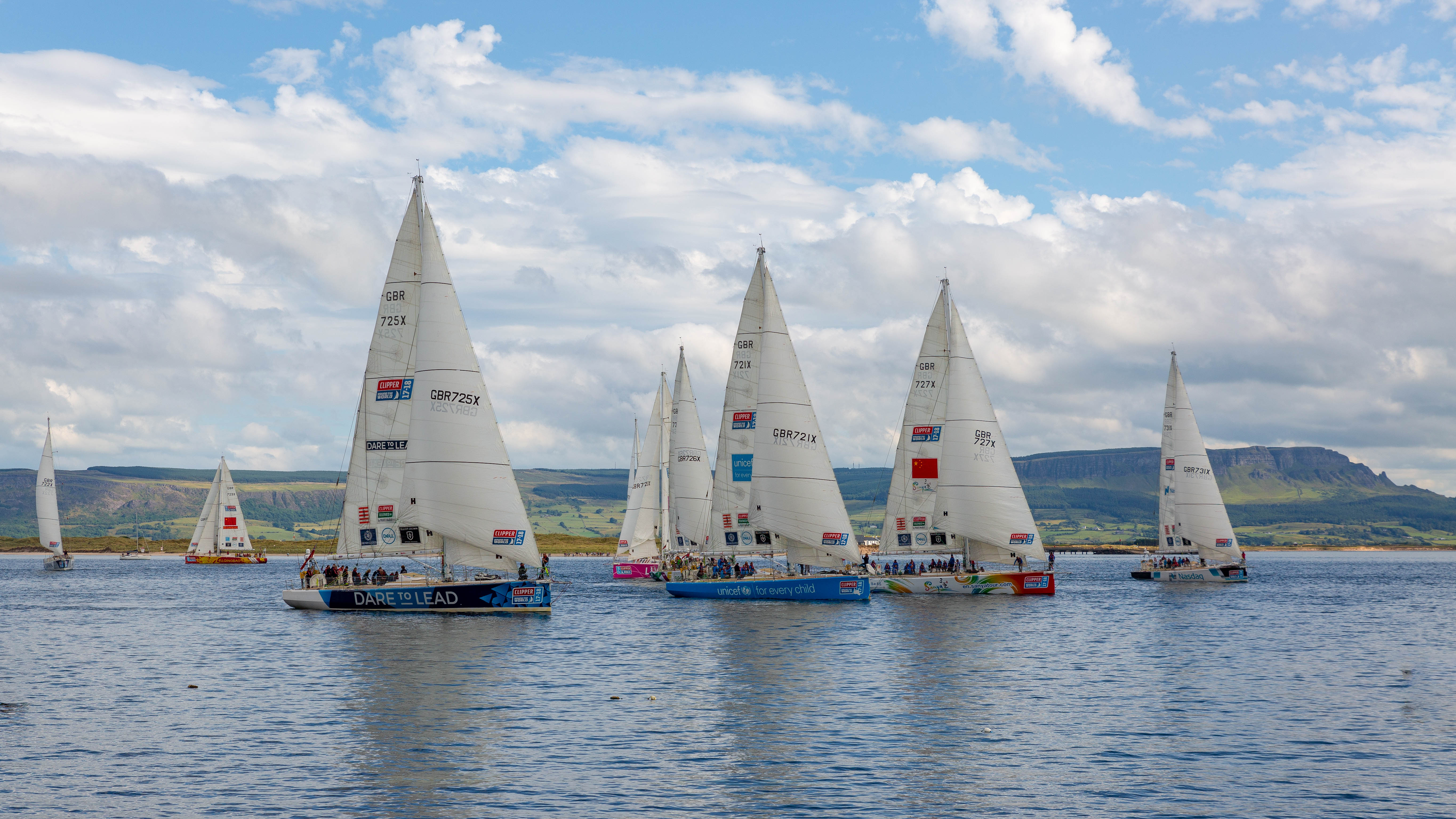
Clipper 70s setting out on the race on Lough Foyle.

Tuck first took part as a Skipper in the Clipper Round the World race in 2015–16, becoming the first Australian woman to do so. In 2017-2018 she became the only Australian to repeat the challenge skippering the 70-foot yacht, Sanya Serenity Coast, over 40,000 nautical miles and six oceans. The yachts are named after the tall ship clippers that raced tea to England. Tuck's crew was not constant and changed regularly throughout the race. On 27 July 2018 12.36 (UTC) she crossed the finish line becoming the first female skipper to win the Clipper Round the World race (or any Round the World yacht race). The second-placed yacht was also skippered by a woman, Nikki Henderson.

Interviewed after the race, she said, “If one little girl sees this, sees it can be done and has a go, that will be what matters to me.”

Tuck has spoken about how she has been inspired by other yachtswomen such as Ellen MacArthur and Kay Cottee.

She was a guest skipper on Maiden's global voyage in 2018 in support of The Maiden Factor Foundation. Captaining the boat from Sri Lanka to Los Angeles, stopping at Fremantle, Sydney, Auckland, Honolulu, Vancouver, Seattle, San Francisco and Los Angeles.
