= Flyer II (yacht) =

- Nation: Netherlands

Racing career
- Skippers: Conny van Rietschoten
- Notable victories: 1981–82 Whitbread

Flyer II is a yacht. She won the 1981–82 Whitbread Round the World Race skippered by Conny van Rietschoten.

== 1981–82 Flyer II crew ==
- Conny van Rietschoten – Skipper
- Aedgard Koekebakker – Watchleader
- Erle Williams – Watchleader/Shipwright
- Daniel Wlochovski – Navigator/Electrician
- Joey Allen
- Patrick Antelme – Cook
- Bill Biewenga
- Warwick Buckley
- Grant Dalton – Sailmaker
- Lobo Fischer
- Julian Fuller – Doctor
- Steve Harrison – Rigger
- George Hendy
- Roger Janes
- Russell Pickthall – Sailmaker
- Dirk Reidel
- Michel Santander
- Onne van der Wal – Engineer/Photographer
- John Vitali
