= Nikki Henderson =

British professional yachtswoman (born 1993)

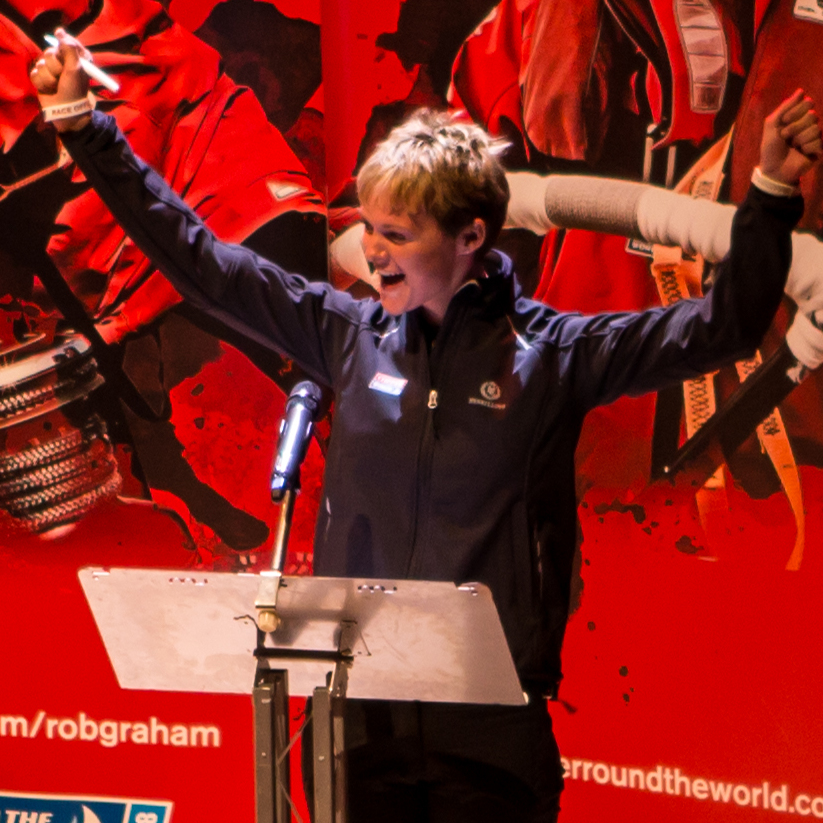
Nikki Henderson

Nicola Henderson (born 1993) is a British professional yachtswoman. In 2018, she became the youngest ever skipper to lead a team in the Clipper Round the World Yacht Race at the age of 25.

== Sailing career ==
Henderson began sailing aged 13. After spending a short period of time with the Sea Cadets, she decided to pursue a career in sailing. Following a season working with "Girls for Sail" (the UK's only all-female sailing school), Henderson skippered three ARC Trans Atlantic races, twice as youngest skipper in the race. She has raced three Caribbean seasons, skippered the RORC Caribbean 600, competed in two editions of the Fastnet Race, and gained further experience teaching and offshore racing in Europe. She was selected as skipper of Visit Seattle in the 2017/2018 Clipper Round the World Yacht Race.

Two days after her 25th birthday, Henderson skippered Visit Seattle to second place in the 2017/2018 Clipper Round the World Yacht Race. She was the youngest skipper in the Clipper Round the World Yacht Race history. The same race saw Wendy Tuck become the first woman to win a round the world race.

Henderson will be a guest skipper on Maiden's global voyage in 2018 in support of The Maiden Factor Foundation.

In June 2019, Henderson joined the winning team "Sail Like a Girl" to compete in the Race to Alaska, an engineless boat race from Port Townsend, Washington, to Ketchikan, Alaska.

In November 2019, she accompanied the environmental activist Greta Thunberg on her return voyage to Europe aboard the catamaran La Vagabonde.

== Personal life ==
Henderson is the daughter of former Conservative Minister of State for Skills and Apprenticeships Anne Milton.
