= Clipper Round the World Yacht Race =

Biennial yacht race to partially or fully circumnavigate the globe

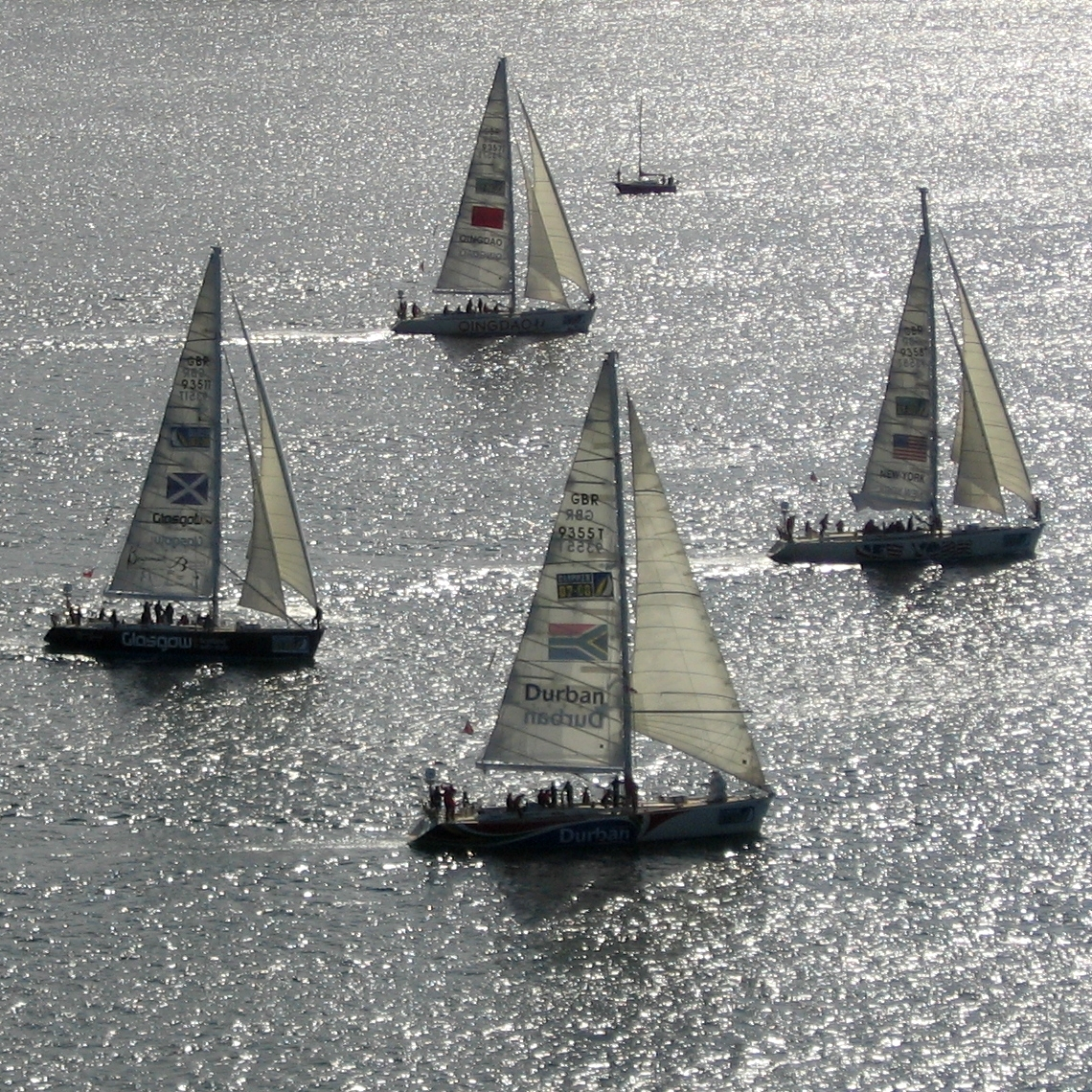
Approaching the starting line on a leg of the Clipper Round the World Yacht Race in Halifax, Nova Scotia, 12 June 2008

The Clipper Round the World Yacht Race is a biennial sailing race that takes paying amateur crews on one or more legs of a circumnavigation of the globe in 11 specially designed identical yachts owned by Clipper Ventures. Professional skippers and additional qualified persons (AQPs) lead each of the teams on the 10-month journey. All participants must complete a four-week training course before starting the race. The race was conceived in 1995 by Sir Robin Knox-Johnston and is run by Clipper Ventures plc. The race has been held every two years since 1996, although in 2004 there was not a race and biennial racing resumed in 2005.

In contrast to the now-defunct Global Challenge, the Clipper Race route follows the prevailing currents and winds and uses lighter, faster boats. The current fleet of 11 yachts are Clipper 70 yachts that were first used in the 2013–14 race. Previous race fleets were composed of eight Clipper 60s and ten Clipper 68s.

Initial races did not feature corporate or sponsor branding. But in 2000, The Times newspaper signed on as title sponsor and a portion of the fleet was sponsored by international cities. Since then, the yachts in the fleet have been sponsored by countries' tourism boards, port cities or corporate sponsors. Clipper Ventures gifted the naming of a yacht to UNICEF to help raise awareness and funds for the organisation.

In 2018, Wendy Tuck was the first female skipper to win the Clipper Round the World Yacht race with her team. That year also saw another record with Nikki Henderson being named as the youngest skipper ever at just 25 years of age. Nikki Henderson and her team came in second place in the 2018 race.

== Origin ==
The race was conceived in 1995 by Sir Robin Knox-Johnston who together with William Ward (CEO), founded Clipper Ventures, a company that would run the race. Jeremy Knight initially joined as Finance Director in 1998, but later became the chief operating officer.

The origins of the race name "Clipper" comes from the historic tea clippers. In the 1830s tea clippers were small, fast, cargo carrying sailing ships. Premium prices were paid for the season's first consignment of tea to reach London from China. In the Great Tea Race of 1866, four of these ships held an unofficial race, and this inspired the name of the modern day race. The eight Clipper 60 yachts were initially named after tea clippers including Ariel, Blackadder, Taeping and Thermopylae.

Since 1996, the Clipper Race has taken almost 5000 people from all walks of life and from all around the world and turned them into long distance racers. Almost 40% have no previous sailing experience.

== Trophy ==
Teams competed for the Times Clipper 2000 trophy, made of lead crystal. In 2015 the trophy was replaced with the Clipper 'Race Globe' trophy.

== Yachts ==
=== Clipper 60 ===
Clipper 60 Specifications
Hull type	Monohull
Builder	Colvic Craft
Displacement	24,000 kg
Designer	David Pedrick
Engine	Diesel 130 hp, Perkins M165
Length Overall	59 ft 11 in (18.26 m)
Length Water Line	52 ft 3 in (15.93 m)
Beam	15 ft 7 in (4.75 m)
Draft	7 ft 3 in (2.21 m)
IRC Handicap	1.067 (2011)

The fleet for the 1996, 1998, 2000 and 2002 races featured the "Clipper 60", a 60-foot yacht designed by David Pedrick and built by Colvic Craft. The design was based on the Camper and Nicholson Bluewater 58 cruising yacht. Modifications were made to the cruising version including a new deck layout better suited to ocean racing and an enlarged rig. Eight Clipper 60s were built. After the 2002-03 race, some of the Clipper 60s were initially retained for use in crew training and corporate events, but all have now been sold (for example Antiope now operates as a charter yacht based in Iceland).

==== Yacht names ====
Clipper 60 yacht names
Sail number	Callsign	MMSI	1996	1998	2000	2002	# Podium placings	New owners
GBR61L	MWEG5	234295000	Taeping	Taeping	Plymouth	Cape Town	1	Owned by Lewis Learning Ltd. Bought in March 2017 to replace Chrysolite scuttled in the Atlantic in February 2017. Previously owned by Blue Box Sailing.
GBR62L	MWEF5	235009160	Ariel	Ariel	London	London	3	Sold February 2012 to buyer in Hong Kong. Now Rizhao, sail number CHN 060626
GBR63L	MWED5	234293000	Thermopylae	Thermopylae	Leeds	Hong Kong	0	Discovery Sailing Project
GBR64L	MWEB5	234292000	Mermerus	Mermerus	Jersey	Jersey	3	Bought by a private owner and converted to cruising yacht, then purchased by Blue Box Sailing in December 2014. Since October 2018 Bluejay, owned by Rubicon 3
GBR65L	MWEA5	235011100	Serica	Serica	Bristol	Bristol	2	Blue Box Sailing. Now Starling owned by Rubicon 3
GBR66L	TFAQ	251771000	Antiope	Antiope	Liverpool	Liverpool	2	Now Aurora owned by Aurora Arktika
GBR67L	MWDY5	234289000	Chrysolite	Chrysolite	Glasgow	Glasgow	1	Scuttled in Atlantic Ocean 11 February 2017. At the time of loss it was named Clyde Challenger and owned by Lewis Learning Ltd. Several previous owners.
GBR68L	MWDX5	235009170	Blackadder	(did not compete)	Portsmouth	New York	0	Now Hummingbird, owned by Rubicon 3

=== Clipper 68 ===
Clipper 68 Specifications
Hull type	Monohull
Rig	Masthead Cutter
Builder	Shanghai Double Happiness Yacht Co. Ltd
Displacement	31.2 tonnes
Designer	Ed Dubois
Length	68 ft (21 m)
Mast height	89 ft 7 in (27.31 m)
IRC Handicap	1.246 (2010)

For the 2005 race, a new fleet of Clipper 68s was built to replace the Clipper 60s. The 68-foot yachts were designed by Ed Dubois, and the fleet increased from eight boats to ten. The Clipper 68's longer hull line, taller mast, lighter overall weight (two tons lighter than its predecessor), and a flatter bottom meant faster boat speeds. The Clipper 68s have logged downwind surfs approaching 30 knots. The yachts were built in China, the first time a fleet of racing yachts had been built in mainland China. Clipper Ventures managed the build themselves with Jeremy Knight heading up the project. In 2010 an additional Clipper 68 was built to replace one that was lost when it ran aground.

The Clipper 68s were retired after the 2011–12 race. Two of the yachts are now based in Australia where they are used for crew training and corporate sailing.

==== Yacht names ====
Clipper 68 yacht names
Hull #	Sail number	Callsign	MMSI	2005	2007	2009	2011	# Podium placings
CV1	GBR9350T	MGMX8	235021704	Liverpool	Liverpool	Edinburgh	Edingburgh Inspiring Capital	0
CV2	GBR9351T	MHAX6	235023621	Glasgow: Scotland with Style	Glasgow	Jamaica	New York	2
CV3	GBR9353T	MHBA9	235023623	westernaustralia.com	westernaustralia.com	Uniquely Singapore	Welcome to Yorkshire	2
CV4 (Now sunk)	GBR9352T	MGZR2	235023622	Uniquely Singapore	Uniquely Singapore	Cork	Did not compete, yacht sunk	1
CV5	GBR9354T	MHUD8	235026123	Jersey	Jamaica	Team Finland	Gold Coast	2
CV6	GBR9355T	MHUJ8	235026119	Durban	Durban	Qingdao	Geraldton	1
CV7	GBR9356T	MJVF8	235009370	New York	Hull and Humber	Cape Breton Island	Uniquely Singapore	4
CV8	GBR9357T	MJWC8	235009350	Qingdao	Qingdao	Hull and Humber	De Lage Landen	0
CV9	GBR9358T	MKJU6	235009770	Victoria	New York	Spirit of Australia	Qingdao	2
CV10	GBR9359T	MKHV5	235009780	Cardiff	Nova Scotia	California	Derry	1
CV11	GBR9352T	2ESG8	235087742	(did not compete)	(did not compete)	(did not compete)	Visit Finland	1

CV5 and CV10 were delivered to Australia where they are used by Clipper Ventures for crew training. CV1 and CV11 are for sale.

=== Clipper 70 ===
From Clipper 2013 onwards, the races feature the Clipper 70, designed by Tony Castro Naval Architects. The fleet of twelve Clipper 70s were built in Qingdao, China in a project headed up again by Jeremy Knight for use in the 2013–14 race.

Clipper 70 Specifications
Hull type	Monohull
Rig	Masthead Cutter
Builder	Nauticstar & Mazarin Yachts, Qingdao, China
Displacement	31.7 metric tonnes
Designer	Tony Castro Naval Architects
Length	23 m (75 ft)
Beam	5.65 m (18.5 ft)
Draft	3 m (9.8 ft)
Mast height	29 m (95 ft)

==== Yacht names ====
Clipper 70 yacht names
Hull #	Sail number	Callsign (old/new)	MMSI (old/new)	2013	2015	2017	2019	2023	2025
CV20	GBR720X	2GIE3	235097602	One DLL	Garmin	Liverpool 2018	Imagine Your Korea	Dare To Lead	Yacht Club Punta del Este
CV21	GBR721X	2GIE4	235097603	Henri Lloyd	IchorCoal	UNICEF	GoToBermuda	Our Isles And Oceans	Power of Seattle Sports
CV22	GBR722X	2GVY6	235100988	Qingdao	PSP Logistics	Garmin	Seattle	Bekezela Community Foundation	Scotland
CV23	GBR723X	2GQD9	235099583	Mission Performance	Visit Seattle	Hotelplanner.com	WTC Logistics	Perseverance	Tongyeong
CV24 (Now sunk)	GBR724X	2GVF2	235100807	Switzerland	LMAX Exchange	Greenings			
CV25	GBR725X	2GTZ4	235100519	Invest Africa	Da Nang – Viet Nam	Dare to Lead	Punta del Este	Zhuhai	London Business School
CV26	GBR726X	2GWE6	235101038	Great Britain	ClipperTelemed+	Visit Seattle	Ha Long Bay, Vietnam	Yacht Club Punta del Este	Washington, DC
CV27	GBR727X	2GVW9	235100974	Team Garmin	GREAT Britain	Sanya Serenity Coast	Dare to Lead	Qingdao	GOSH
CV28	GBR728X	2GWP8	235101124	PSP Logistics	Qingdao	PSP Logistics	Zhuhai	UNICEF	Qingdao
CV29	GBR729X	2GWQ8	235101133	Old Pulteney	Derry-Londonderry-Doire	Qingdao	Visit Sanya, China	PSP Logistics	Warrant
CV30	GBR730X	2GWS2	235101142	Derry-Londonderry-Doire	UNICEF	GREAT Britain	Qingdao	Washington DC	UNICEF
CV31	GBR731X	2GWT6	235101154	Jamaica	Mission Performance	Nasdaq	UNICEF	Ha Long Bay, Viet Nam	

== Races ==
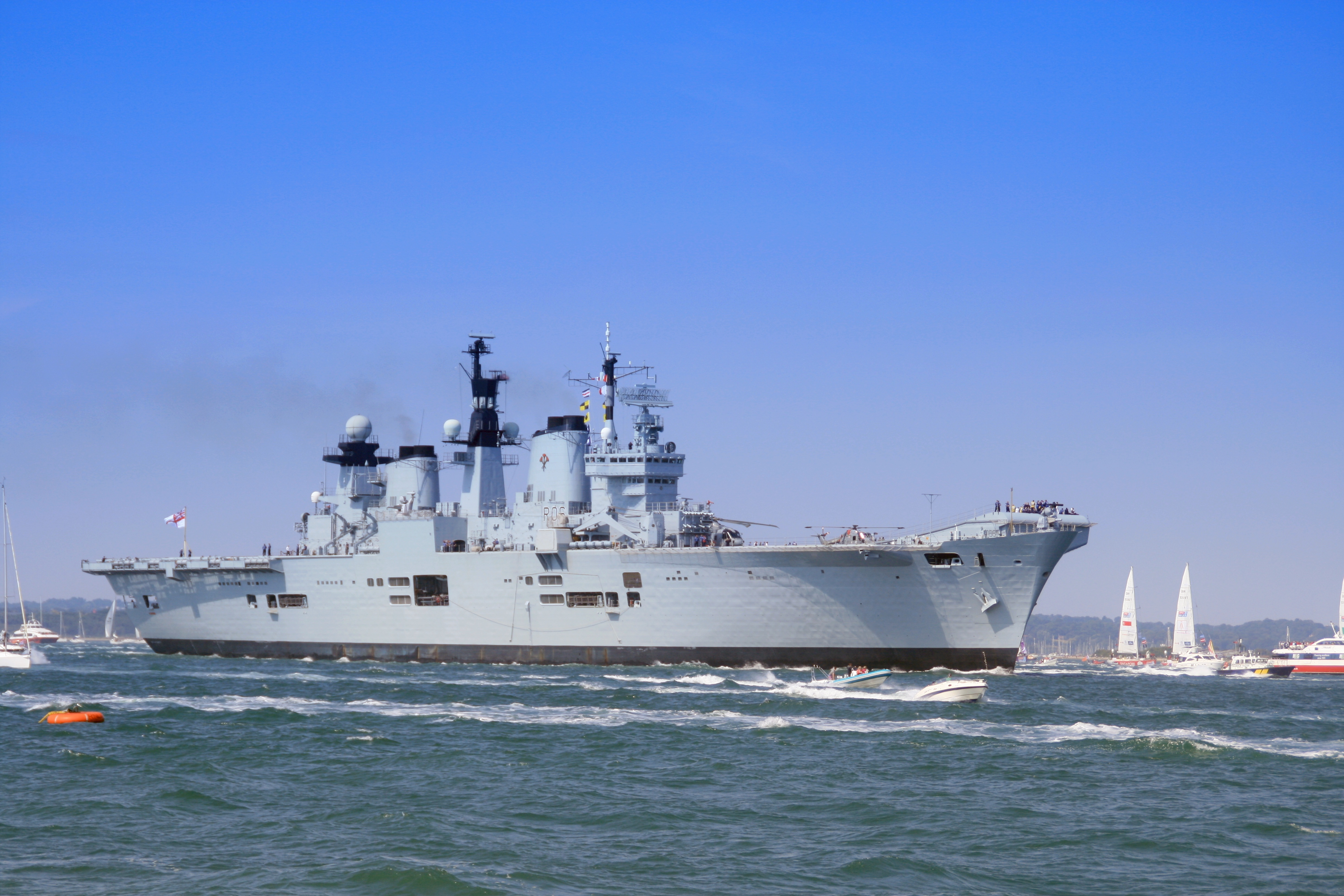
Aircraft carrier HMS Illustrious leading the contestants in the 2011–12 race down Southampton Water to the start line off Cowes, IoW, 31 July 2011, as seen from Calshot Spit.

The race ran every two years between 1996 and 2002, and then skipped a year, with subsequent races beginning in 2005, 2007, 2009, 2011, 2013, 2015, 2017 and 2019. The routes used for the races have varied slightly each race. The routes are selected to allow for a high proportion of downwind sailing, the most technically demanding point of sail. Other considerations include port stops in locations related to yacht or race sponsors.

The first race took place in 1996 with the Clipper 60 fleet departing from Plymouth for a westward circumnavigation with stops at Madeira, Fort Lauderdale, Panama, Galapagos, Hawaii, Yokohama, Shanghai, Hong Kong, Singapore, Seychelles, Durban, Cape Town, Salvador (Brazil), the Azores and back to Plymouth. The 1998 race largely followed the same route as the 1996 race. It was won by Alex Thomson, who was the youngest skipper to win a round the world yacht race at just 24. The 2000 race started in Portsmouth Harbour. The stop in the Azores was replaced by one in New York City, and to compensate for the extra distance the Seychelles to Durban to Cape Town leg was reduced to Mauritius to Cape Town. The 2002 race was the fourth and final circumnavigation for the Clipper 60 fleet. Three of the boats were renamed, and international cities Hong Kong, Cape Town and New York were added to the race. The start point was moved to Liverpool, and an estimated 40,000 spectators came to see the boats off despite a 24-hour delay due to storms in the Irish Sea.

The ten Clipper 68 yachts had their debut in the 2005–06 race in the first east to west circumnavigation. The boats were all sponsored by international cities for the first time, incorporating stops in sponsor cities. The race schedule was significantly altered when Glasgow Clipper reported keel problems in the South China Sea, and diverted to Subic Bay in the Philippines, followed by the rest of the fleet that were showing symptoms, causing an enforced six-week stopover. The 2007–08 race stopped at several different cities to the 2005–06 race due to different race sponsors but still maintained the east to west route. Two yachts were dismasted in the Pacific crossing with several crew evacuated via Coast Guard rescue. The Clipper 2009–10 race started from Kingston upon Hull on the Humber Estuary on 13 September 2009. The race was won by Spirit of Australia on 17 July 2010, when the yachts returned to Hull Marina for a gala celebration. On 15 January 2010, Cork Clipper ran aground on the Gosong Mampango reef in the Java Sea. The crew successfully evacuated the yacht and it was abandoned a few days later after the decision was made that any attempt to salvage her would be uneconomical. A Challenge 67' yacht "Aurora of London" was chartered to replace the Clipper 68 yacht in the race.

The 2011–12 race was the last for the Clipper 68 yachts, departing from Ocean Village in July 2011. The race started in the Solent lasting almost a year and covering an estimated 40,000 nautical miles (74,000 km). The race saw a number of injuries that required evacuation. Two crew were evacuated from Gold Coast Australia in Taiwan harbour after an attempted Coast Guard evacuation was abandoned due to inclement weather. An incident on the Geraldton Western Australia yacht saw two injured crew evacuated from the yacht by US Coastguard Cutter Bertholf in the Pacific.

The 2013–14 race was the first for the expanded fleet of twelve Clipper 70 yachts. For the first time, five of the yachts were sponsored by companies rather than cities. The race set off from London's St. Katherine Docks in September 2013. The 2015–16 race set sail on Sunday 30 August 2015, once again from London's St Katharine Docks. The race was once again sponsored by a mixture of cities and companies.

The 2015–16 race saw the first fatalities in the history of the Clipper race, both on the same boat CV21.

In the 2017–18 race, skipper Wendy Tuck became the first female skipper to win the Clipper race on-board Sanya Serenity Coast.

According to an article in The Times, the postponement of the 2019–20 race due to the COVID-19 pandemic led to the company making a loss of £1.5m on sales of £1m in the financial year to January 2022.

2019–20 race restarted in March 2022 after receiving the special event permit in Philippines. And the race finished next to Royal Albert Dock on Saturday 30 July 2022.

== Sponsorship ==
For the inaugural race the yachts did not feature sponsor's branding. In 2000, The Times newspaper came on board as title sponsor, featuring the race as its Millennium project. The event was renamed The Times Clipper 2000 Race and for the first time, the yachts were backed by UK cities. The city concept evolved in subsequent races with entries from international cities. The race now generated one of the highest returns on investment for sponsors compared to other sailing events.

== Publicity ==
The inaugural race was low-key with the start watched by only a handful of spectators, whereas the start of the 2009–10 race attracted an estimated 150,000 spectators, and the Red Arrows flew overhead.

== Incidents ==
=== Fatalities ===
There have been three fatalities in the 20-year history of the Clipper race. The first two incidents took place during the 2015–16 race, and on the same yacht. The Marine Accident Investigation Branch carried out an investigation into both those incidents, and their subsequent report made a number of recommendations for improved safety on board.

==== Andrew Ashman ====
At midnight on 5 September 2015 – day 7 of the first leg of the race – the fleet were off the coast of Portugal when Andrew Ashman (49), a watch leader aboard IchorCoal was knocked unconscious as he adjusted the mainsheet while reefing. Resuscitation attempts were not successful, and he died. The interim Marine Accident Investigation Branch report found that the injury took place during two uncontrolled gybes, with the boom swinging across the yacht due to a broken preventer.

==== Sarah Young ====
On 1 April 2016 – day 12 of the North Pacific leg, the crew of IchorCoal had just reefed her mainsail in 35–40 knots (65–74 km/h) of wind. Crewmember Sarah Young (40) was tidying the ropes in the cockpit when she was knocked from her position by a wave which swept her backward, under the guardrail and overboard. She had not been clipped on and was swept away in strong winds. The crew used the signal from her personal AIS transmitter to locate her in the water and then recovered her on board, but were unable to resuscitate her after an hour in the water. Young was buried at sea, with her family's permission, due to the boat's position and the time it would take to reach land.

==== Simon Speirs ====
On 18 November 2017 – day 18 of the Cape Town to Fremantle leg of the 2017-18 race – despite being clipped on, 60-year-old Simon Speirs was washed overboard during a headsail change on CV30 Great Britain. He was recovered from the sea within 36 minutes but did not regain consciousness. He was buried at sea the following morning. The MAIB's initial findings concluded that the hook at the end of his safety tether had deformed under load after being caught under a deck cleat and eventually released.

=== Loss of yachts ===
Two yachts have been shipwrecked during the race:

- On 15 January 2010, Cork Clipper ran aground on the Gosong Mampango reef in the Java Sea at 3°35.1195′S 109°10.9′E. In 1992 it was reported that the reef and its associated light lie 0.9 nmi (1.7 km) east of their charted positions. The crew successfully evacuated the yacht and were aided by competitors Team California and Team Finland. Cork Clipper was abandoned a few days later after the decision was made that any attempt to salvage her would be uneconomical.
- On 31 October 2017 at approximately 2140 UTC (2340 local time), Greenings ran aground on the rocky shoreline of the western side of the Cape Peninsula, roughly halfway between Cape Town and Cape Point. A Marine Accident Investigation Branch investigation concluded that the Clipper yacht grounding was caused by insufficient planning. The yacht was dismantled.

=== Discovery of 'ghost ship' ===
On 31 January 2016, while on Race 7 from Australia to Vietnam, LMAX Exchange came across a ghost ship — the private yacht Sayo, dismasted and adrift about 470 nmi (870 km) west of Guam. On investigation, the body of owner Manfred Fritz Bajorat of Germany was found dead aboard the yacht "in an advanced state of decomposition". On reporting the finding to authorities and being unable to provide any further assistance, the LMAX Exchange was permitted to continue on its way. The yacht and occupant were later discovered by fishermen in the Philippine Sea and made international headlines for the macabre nature of the discovery.

== Ownership ==
In November 2022, The Times reported that Knox-Johnston and Ward were seeking a high net worth individual with an interest in sailing to buy Clipper Ventures PLC, at a price of £60 million but were keen to stay on as president and executive chairman of the company.
