= 1981–1982 Whitbread Round the World Race =

1981–82 Whitbread Round the World Race
Event title
- Edition: 3rd
- Yachts: Multi-class

Competitors
- Competitors: 29

Results
- Winner: Flyer II

The 1981–82 Whitbread Round the World Race was the third edition of the around-the-world sailing event Whitbread Round the World Race. On 29 August 1981, 29 boats started out from Southampton for the Whitbread Round the World Race.

The maxi yacht Flyer II was designed by Germán Frers and built at the W. Huisman shipyard in 1981 for skipper Cornelius van Rietschoten. In an unusual feat, she won the race both on line honours and on handicap. Only 20 finished the race out of the 29 that started it.

== Legs ==
Ports visited

Leg	Start	Finish	Leg winner elapsed time	Leg winner corrected time
1	Southampton, England	Cape Town, South Africa	Flyer II	Kriter IX
2	Cape Town, South Africa	Auckland, New Zealand	Flyer II	Ceramco NZ
3	Auckland, New Zealand	Mar del Plata, Argentina	Flyer II	Mor Bihan
4	Mar del Plata, Argentina	Portsmouth, England	Flyer II	Ceramco NZ

== Results ==
Overall Pos	Line Honours Pos	Sail Number	Yacht	Country	Yacht Type	LOA (Metres)	Skipper	Elapsed Time d:hh:mm:ss	Corrected time d:hh:mm:ss
1	1	H 2869	Flyer II	Netherlands	Frers 76 Sloop Maxi	23.16	Cornelis van Rietschoten	120:06:34:14	119:01:12:48
2	2	F 15	Charles Heidsieck III	France	Vaton 67 Sloop	20.27	Alain Gabbay	131:21:34:35	120:07:55:29
3	4	F 8000	Kriter IX	France	Frers 62 Sloop	18.97	André Viant	134:07:37:42	120:10:50:26
4	8	Z 1418	Disque d'Or III	Switzerland	Farr 58 Sloop	17.75	Pierre Fehlmann	143:13:00:28	123:11:45:17
5	12	KZ 4525	Outward Bound	New Zealand	Davidson 50 Sloop	15.44	Digby Taylor	151:15:19:30	124:11:55:03
6	10	SA 73	Xargo III	South Africa	Frers Swan 65	19.68	Peter Kuttel	147:15:10:18	124:19:02:37
7	13	F 8292	Mor Bihan	France	Joubert-Nivelt 49 Prototype Sloop	14.81	Philippe Poupon; Eugene Riguidel	156:12:34:17	125:15:24:45
8	11	N 3000	Berge Viking	Norway	Sparkman & Stephens Swan 57	17.37	Peder Lunde	149:20:57:51	125:16:54:17
9	7	US 59707	Alaska Eagle	United States	Sparkman & Stephens 65 Sloop	19.86	Skip Novak; Neil Bergt	142:04:56:52	126:10:51:44
10	5	F 5999	Euromarché	France	Mauric 74 Ketch Maxi	22.17	Éric Tabarly	134:15:28:42	126:23:37:40
11	3	KZ 4400	Ceramco New Zealand	New Zealand	Farr 69 Sloop Maxi	20.88	Peter Blake	132:11:55:38	127:17:42:43
12	15	L 1700	Skopbank of Finland	Finland	C&C Yachts Baltic 51	15.47	Kenneth Gahmberg	158:09:54:32	128:15:06:47
13	14	I 9333	Rolly Go	Italy	Frers 51 Sloop	15.62	Giorgio Falck	157:12:41:33	129:20:52:12
14	16	EUR 1	Traité de Rome	Europe	Sparkman & Stephens 51 Sloop	15.60	Antonio Chioatto	166:10:40:09	130:23:58:41
15	17	B 711	Croky	Belgium	Vankeirsbilck 44 Sloop	13.33	Gustaaf Versluys	170:00:22:24	133:23:34:43
16	6	K 808	FCF Challenger	(United Kingdom) Great Britain	Williams-Peterson Ocean 80 Sloop Maxi	24.54	Leslie Williams	138:15:27:12	138:15:27:12
17	9	K 3566	United Friendly	(United Kingdom) Great Britain	Gurney 77 Sloop Maxi	23.52	Chay Blyth	143:22:23:50	141:10:06:55
18	19	G 909	Walross III Berlin	West Germany	Sparkman & Stephens Swan 55	16.03	Olaf Michel; Ekhart Hahn; Claus Reichardt	177:07:16:44	143:19:36:03
19	18	E 2043	Licor 43	Spain	Bazan 60 Sloop	18.29	Joaquin Coello	174:14:59:02	160:02:16:35
20	20	I 9469	Ilgagomma	Italy	Carozzo AC50 Cutter	15.24	Roberto Vianello	187:12:47:22	160:09:22:55
DNF	21	K 1024	Bubblegum	(United Kingdom) Great Britain	Peterson Contessa 43	12.95	Ian McGowan-Fyfe	Retired-Leg 3	
DNF	22	F 7777	Gauloises III	France	Holland 63 Sloop	19.13	Eric Loizeau	Retired-Leg 3	
DNF	23	I 9167	Save Venice	Italy	Scattolin 65 Sloop	19.74	Doi Malingri di Bagnolo	Retired-Leg 3	
DNF	24	S 8876	Swedish Entry	Sweden	Norlin 61 Sloop	18.47	Peder Silfverhielm	Retired-Leg 3	
DNF	25	B 969	European University Belgium	Belgium	Frers 46 Sloop	14.02	Jean Vincent Blondiau	Retired-Leg 2	
DNF	26	F 8333	33 Export	France	Briand 58 Sloop	17.58	Thomas Philippe; Philippe Schaff	Retired-Leg 2	
DNF	27	I 9564	Vivanapoli	Italy	Simeone 57 Schooner	17.30	Beppe Panada	Retired-Leg 1	
DNF	28	I 9488	La Barca Laboratorio	Italy	Giorgetti-Magrini 64 Sloop	19.38	Claudio Stampi	Retired-Leg 1	
DNF	29	S 7770	Scandinavian	Sweden	Sparkman & Stephens Swan 57	17.37	Reino Engqvist	Retired-Leg 1	
