= L'Esprit d'équipe =

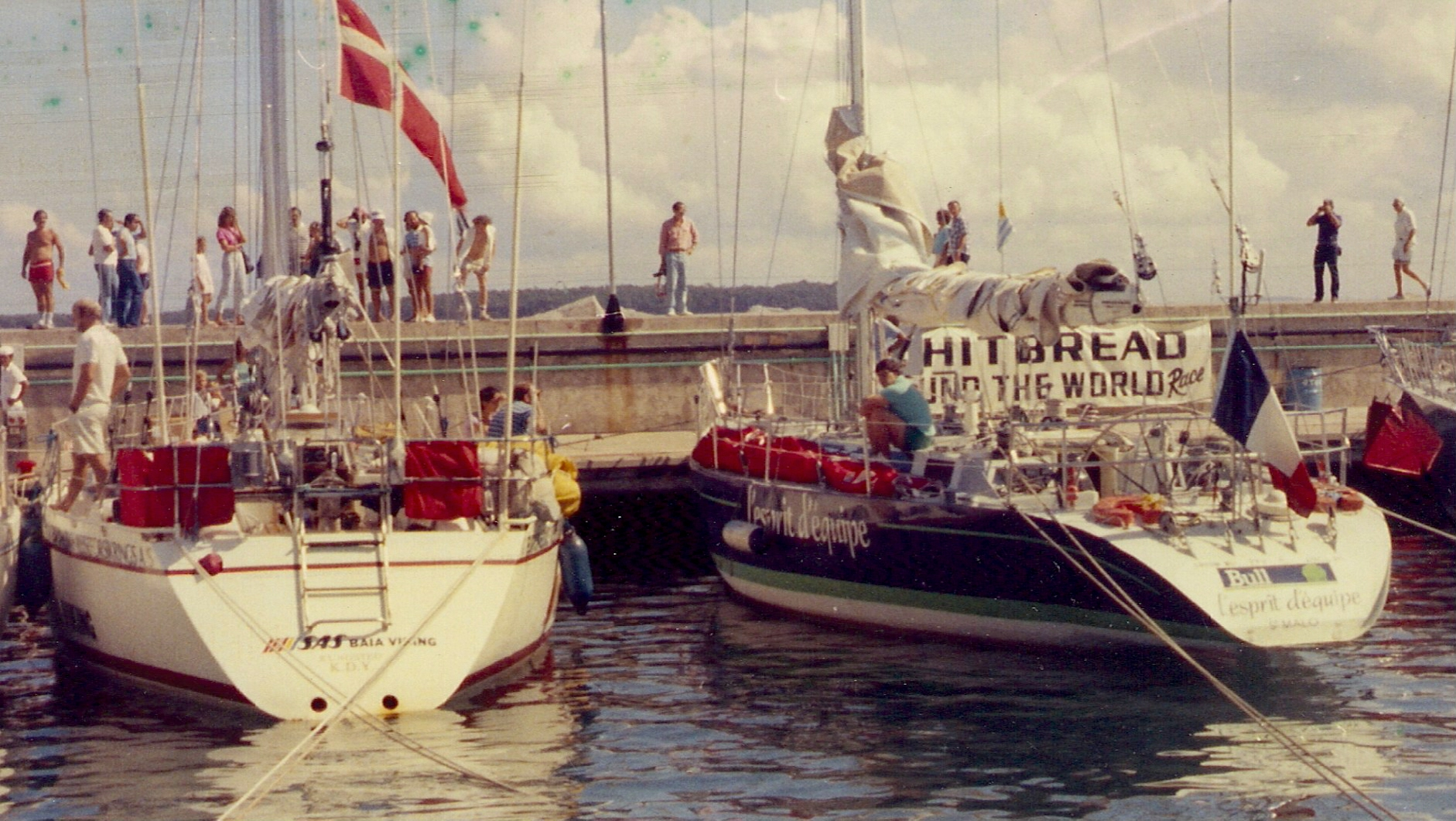
- SAS Baia Viking and L'Esprit d'équipe (right) during the 1985–86 Whitbread Round the World Race.
- Other names: 33 Export; Esprit de Liberté
- Nation: France

Racing career
- Skippers: Lionel Péan
- Notable victories: 1985–86 Whitbread

L'Esprit d'équipe (also 33 Export, Esprit de Liberté) is a yacht. She won her class in the 1985–86 Whitbread Round the World Race skippered by Lionel Péan.

She had earlier competed in the 1981–82 Whitbread Round the World Race as 33 Export but lost her mast in the Southern Ocean and did not finish the race.
