= Global Solo Challenge =

Non-stop, single-handed, round-the-world yacht race

- Type: single-handed non-stop round-the-world yacht race
- Start: Vigo, Galicia, Spain
- Finish: Vigo, Galicia, Spain
- Length: 26,000 nmi (48,000 km)
- Website: globalsolochallenge.com

The Global Solo Challenge is a single-handed (solo) non-stop round the world yacht race. The race was founded by Marco Nannini. The Second edition will be 2027-2028, starting and finishing in Vigo, Galicia, Spain.

== History ==
The race was founded by Marco Nannini, and first ran beginning on September 30, 2023. Nannini is a sailor, writer and consultant in marketing and communication with a financial background. After a career in banking in the City of London he decided to take part in the Global Ocean Race 2011/2012 taking second place overall.

== The race ==
The race was designed with the intent that budget alone would not be a deciding factor in how well each boat does. Each boat's departures date is set according to the boat's performance characteristics. Slower boats start earlier than faster boats. The faster boats then have to try to catch up with the slower boats. Once at sea, there are no classes. The first boat to cross the finish line wins.

During the race, boats may anchor, but outside assistance is restricted. Time penalties are imposed for infractions.

Making way under engine is not permitted except for emergency situations. The organizer may apply a time penalty if it is deemed that the participant has gained an unfair advantage as a result of using its motor.

All boats are monitored using satellite trackers.

External weather routing is permitted.

== Yachts ==
The race is open to monohull yachts with LOA greater than 32 ft, including one-off open designs and other racing boats such as Class40, Open 50 and IMOCA 60. Boats not meeting this criterion may still apply and may be accepted at the sole discretion of the Organizer.

== Course ==
The course is essentially a circumnavigation along the clipper route: from Vigo, Galicia, Spain, down the Atlantic Ocean to the Cape of Good Hope; then clockwise around Antarctica, keeping Cape Leeuwin and Cape Horn to port; then back to Vigo. There is an exclusion zone set around Antarctica where competitors are prohibited to sail due to risk of ice-bergs.

A circumnavigation by the three great capes is approximately 26,000 Nautical Miles long, and runs from August to the following August, timed to place the competitors in the Southern Ocean during the austral summer.

== Qualification ==
Skippers must be 18 years of age or older by departure date and are required to have taken medical and survival courses within 18 months of departure.

All skippers must have sailed a minimum qualification passage of 2,000 nautical miles single-handed and non-stop on the boat entered in the event by a passage route approved by the Organizer.

== Results ==
1st Edition, starting and finishing at A Coruña, Spain: 2023-2024
Pos.	Boat name	Skipper	Start time	Finish	Elapsed time	Distance sailed (NM)	Cause for retiring
1	Mowgli	Philippe Delamare (FRA)	2023-09-30-13:00	2024-02-24-14:03	147d 01h 03m	26,522	
2	First Light	Cole Brauer (USA)	2023-10-29-04:38	2024-03-07-07:23	130d 02h 45m	27,759	
3	Vento di Sardegna	Andrea Mura (ITA)	2023-11-18-13:00	2024-03-17-15:44	120d 02h 44m	27,146	
4	Obportus	Riccardo Tosetto (ITA)	2023-10-29-08:00	2024-03-30-08:04	153d 00h 04m	28,792	
5	Kawan 3 - Unicancer	François Gouin (FRA)	2023-10-29-09:25	2024-04-04-11:09	158d 01h 44m	27,881	
6	Koloa Maoli	David Linger (USA)	2023-10-29-09:45	2024-04-21-12:03	175d 2h 18m	27,040	
7	Le Souffle de la Mer III	Louis Robein (FRA)	2023-09-30-09:00	2024-07-03-14:32	277d 5h 32m	29,825	
8	Aspra	Alessandro Tosetti (ITA)	2023-10-29-08:13			17,850	Rigging problems
9	Roaring Forty	Kevin Le Poidevin (AUS)	2023-11-23-12:30			13,060	Late for Cape Horn
10	Phoenix	William MacBrien (CAN)	2023-10-21-13:00			18,524	Collision, flooded, rescued
11	Shipyard Brewing	Ronnie Simpson (USA)	2023-10-29-08:02			21,250	Dismasted, rescued
12	Espresso Martini	Pavlin Nadvorni (BUL)	2023-10-21-13:00			14,690	Medical
13	SolarWind	Édouard De Keyser (BEL)	2023-09-17-13:00			13,780	Rudder failure
14	ZEROchallenge	Ari Känsäkoski (FIN)	2023-10-21-13:00			11,460	Dismasted
15	Bendigedig	Dafydd Hughes (WAL)	2023-08-26-13:00			13,084	Autopilot issues
16	Sorolla	Juan Merediz (SPA)	2023-10-29-07:56			1,408	Autopilot issues

== See also ==
- Single-handed sailing
- Circumnavigation
- List of circumnavigations

Notable around the world races

- The Vendée Globe, a non-stop solo race, currently run using the IMOCA 60 Class.
- The Ocean Race, a stopping fully crewed race, currently using the Volvo Ocean 65 and IMOCA 60 class. Previously known as the Whitbread Round The World Race and the Volvo Ocean Race.
- The Clipper Round the World Yacht Race, a stopping crewed race for amateur crews using the Clipper 70 Class.
- The Golden Globe Race has returned since 2018 as a retro sailing race without the use of modern technology for navigation.
- The Jules Verne Trophy, a trophy for the fastest circumnavigation of the world by any type of yacht with no restrictions on the size of the crew.

Former races including

- The Sunday Times Golden Globe Race, held in 1968-1969, the first round-the-world yacht race.
- The BT Global Challenge, was a race held every four years and followed the westward route.
- The Race, was a race held in 2000, involving multihulls.
- The Oryx Quest, held in 2005, starting from Qatar.
- The Velux 5 Oceans Race, a stopping solo race, currently run using the IMOCA 60 Class previously known as the BOC Challenge, later as Around Alone.
- The Barcelona World Race, a non-stop two handed race, currently run using the IMOCA 60 Class.
