= Daedalus (yacht) =

Maxi-catamaran built in Canada in 1983

- Other names: Formule Tag; ENZA New Zealand (1993–94); Royal & SunAlliance; Team Legato; Doha; Spirit of Antigua
- Designer(s): Nigel Irens; Adrian Thomson (re-design)
- Builder: Canadair
- Launched: 1983

Racing career
- Skippers: Mike Birch; Peter Blake; Robin Knox-Johnston; Tracy Edwards; Tony Bullimore

Specifications
- Displacement: 14.5 t (14.3 long tons; 16.0 short tons)
- Length: 30.50 m (100.1 ft) (LOA)
- Beam: 12.80 m (42.0 ft)
- Draft: 3 m (9.8 ft)
- Mast height: 33 m (108 ft)
- Sail area: 300 m^{2} (3,200 sq ft) (upwind); 534 m^{2} (5,750 sq ft) (downwind)

Daedalus is a maxi-catamaran, that participated in numerous open-ocean races under various owners and names.

== History ==
Originally named Formule Tag, this maxi-catamaran was built by Canadair in Québec, Canada in 1983, under the supervision of Canadian skipper Mike Birch and British designer Nigel Irens. The yacht was built to compete in the inaugural Transat Québec-Saint-Malo—a trans-North Atlantic sailing race celebrating Jacques Cartier's 1534 voyage from Saint-Malo, France, to present day Québec City.

It was the largest sailing catamaran of its time, with a length of 85 feet, and participated in a number of races. In 1984 Birch and crew sailed her to a new record for a Day's run, sailing 512 nautical miles in 24 hours.

In 1993, Formule Tag was purchased by Robin Knox-Johnston and future two-time America's Cup winner Peter Blake. The two skippers renamed her ENZA New Zealand (ENZA an acronym for Eat New Zealand Apples). The two launched a 1993 attempt (thwarted by damage) on the Jules Verne Trophy for the fastest sail circumnavigation of the world. They captured the Jules Verne Trophy in 1994, circling the globe in 74 days 22 hours 17 minutes and 22 seconds.

By 1998, British skipper Tracy Edwards had bought the yacht and renamed her Royal & SunAlliance. Edwards and crew set a new record for an all-female crew sailing across the North Atlantic, at 9 days 11 hours 21 minutes and 55 seconds. Tracy and her crew broke a total of seven world records with the Royal & SunAlliance, including a Channel Record that stood for three years. During their attempt to win the Jules Verne Trophy, the Royal & SunAlliance was dismasted in the Southern Ocean.

In 2000, Tony Bullimore purchased the yacht, renamed her Team Legato, and lengthened her to 100 feet. Team Legato participated in the 2000/2001 circumnavigation sailing competition The Race, finishing fifth of the seven teams entered.

By 2005, Bullimore had renamed her Daedalus. While Daedalus finished second, of four yachts, in the 2005 Oryx Quest circumnavigation sailing competition, Bullimore set a record during the South Atlantic leg at 11 days 10 hours 22 minutes and 13 seconds.

In 2006, Tony Bullimore renamed her again to Doha, and took her into another attempt at the Jules Verne Trophy – abandoning the attempt due to mechanical failure.

By 2009, skipper Bullimore had renamed the yacht Spirit of Antigua.

The catamaran was entirely renovated in 2000 for The Race. It received new stems, making the hulls 4.6 metres longer.

Another renovation in 2017 converted the boat to a hydrogen-powered vessel, the Energy Observer.

== Records and races ==
- Under the name Enza in 1994 : Jules Verne Trophy (new record around the World), skippered by Peter Blake and Robin Knox-Johnston, in 74 days, 22 hours, 17 minutes et 22 seconds, with an average speed of 12 knots.
- Under the name Team Legato in 2000 : 5th position of The Race.
- Under the name Daedalus in 2005 : 2nd position of the Oryx Quest.

Records
Preceded by Explorer with Bruno Peyron	Jules Verne Trophy; 1994–1997	Succeeded by Sport Elec with Olivier de Kersauson
