= Doha 2006 (yacht) =

- Other names: Club Med; Maiden 2
- Designer(s): Gilles Ollier
- Builder: Multiplast
- Launched: 2000

Racing career
- Skippers: Grant Dalton; Tracy Edwards; Brian Thompson
- Notable victories: The Race

Specifications
- Displacement: 21 t (21 long tons; 23 short tons)
- Length: 33.50 m (109.9 ft) (LOA)
- Beam: 16.50 m (54.1 ft)
- Mast height: 40 m (130 ft)
- Crew: 13

Doha 2006 is a maxi-catamaran, that has participated in many offshore races under several names:

- Club Med, skippered by Grant Dalton, for The Race,
- Maiden 2, skippered by Tracy Edwards and Brian Thompson,
- Doha 2006, skippered by Brian Thompson for the Oryx Quest.

It is the sister-ship of Gitana 13, winner of the Jules Verne Trophy with Bruno Peyron.

== Records ==
- Under the name Club Med in 2000 : Winner of The Race.
- Under the names Club Med or Maiden 2 3 times between 2000 and 2002 : Winner of the 24 hours distance record, with, in 2002, 694.78 nautical miles (1,286.73 km).
- Under the name Doha 2006 in 2004 : Winner of the Oryx Quest.
