= IMOCA 60 Kingfisher =

Sailboat

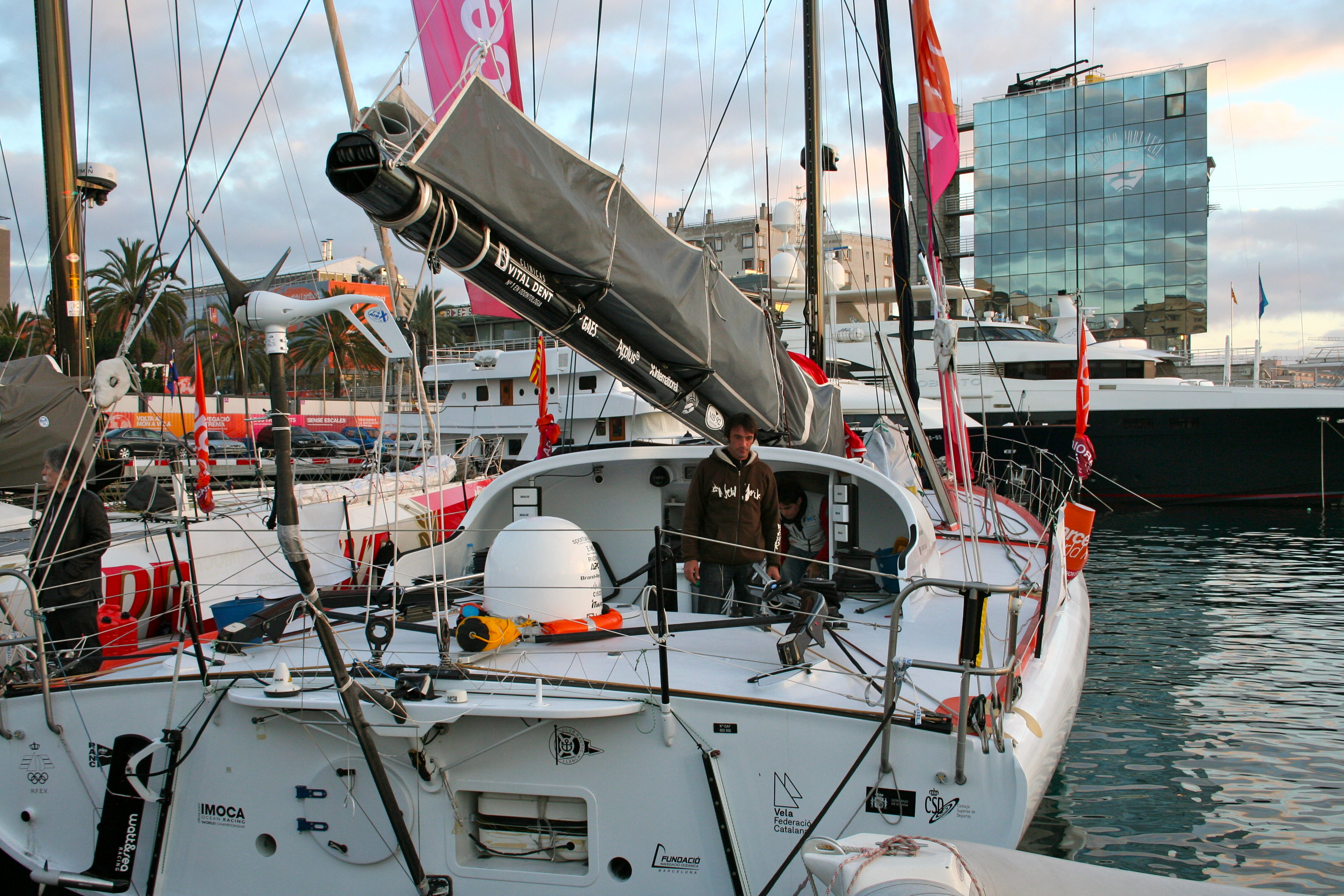

Development
- Designer: Owen Clarke Design; Humphries Yacht Design; Giovanni Belgranno
- Year: February 2000
- Builder: Marten Marine (NZL)
- Previous Name: Team 888; Team Cowes; Skandia; Safran; Educación Sin Fronteras; Fòrum Marítim Català; One Planet, One Ocean & Pharmaton
- Launch Name: Kingfisher

Racing
- Class association: IMOCA 60

Launched as Kingfisher is an IMOCA 60 monohull sailing yacht, designed by Owen Clarke Design, Rob Humphreys and Giovanni Belgranno and constructed by Marten Marine in New Zealand.

== Racing results ==
Pos	Year	Race	Class	Boat name	Skipper	Notes	Ref
Round the World Races
20 / 33	2020	2020–2021 Vendée Globe	IMOCA 60	One Planet One Ocean	Didac Costa (ESP)		
12 / 29	2016	2016–2017 Vendée Globe	IMOCA 60	One Planet, One Ocean & Pharmaton	Didac Costa (ESP)		
4 / 8	2016	Barcelona World Race	IMOCA 60	One Planet, One Ocean & Pharmaton	Didac Costa (ESP); Aleix Gelabert (FRA)		
8 / 14	2011	Barcelona World Race	IMOCA 60	Fòrum Marítim Català	Gerard Marín (FRA); Ludovic Aglaor (FRA)		
5 / 9	2007	Barcelona World Race	IMOCA 60	Educación Sin Fronteras	Albert Bargués (FRA); Servane Escoffier (FRA)		
DNF	2004	2004–2005 Vendée Globe	IMOCA 60	Skandia	Nick Moloney (AUS)		
2 /	2000	2000–2001 Vendée Globe	IMOCA 60	Kingfisher	Ellen MacArthur (GBR)		
Transadlantic Races
7 / 12	2006	Route du Rhum	IMOCA 60	Safran	Marc Guillemot (FRA)		
5 / 12	2005	Transat Jacques Vabre	IMOCA 60		Will Oxley (AUS); Brian Thompson (GBR)		
6 / 17	2003	Transat Jacques Vabre	IMOCA 60		Nick Moloney (AUS); Samantha Davies (GBR)		
1	2002	Route du Rhum	IMOCA 60	Kingfisher	Ellen MacArthur (GBR)		
3 / 12	2001	Transat Jacques Vabre	IMOCA 60	CASTO-BUT-DARTY	Mark Turner (GBR); Nick Moloney (AUS)		
1 / 19	2000	The Europe 1 New Man STAR, 2000	IMOCA 60	Kingfisher	Ellen MacArthur (GBR)		
Other Races
5	2003	Rolex Fastnet Race	IMOCA 60	SKANDIA SET SAIL	Nick Moloney (AUS) +Crew		

== Timeline ==
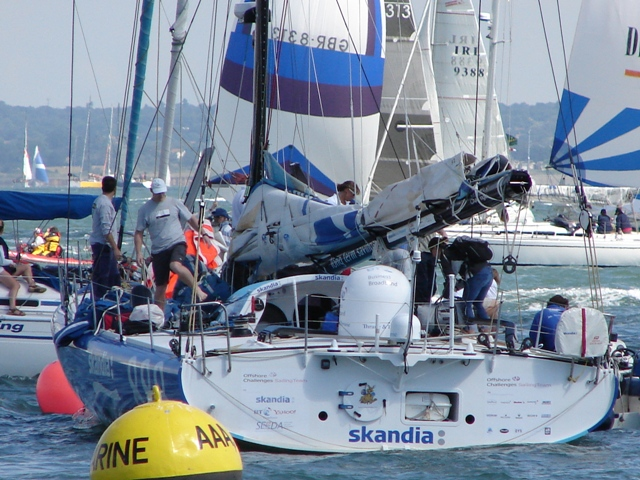

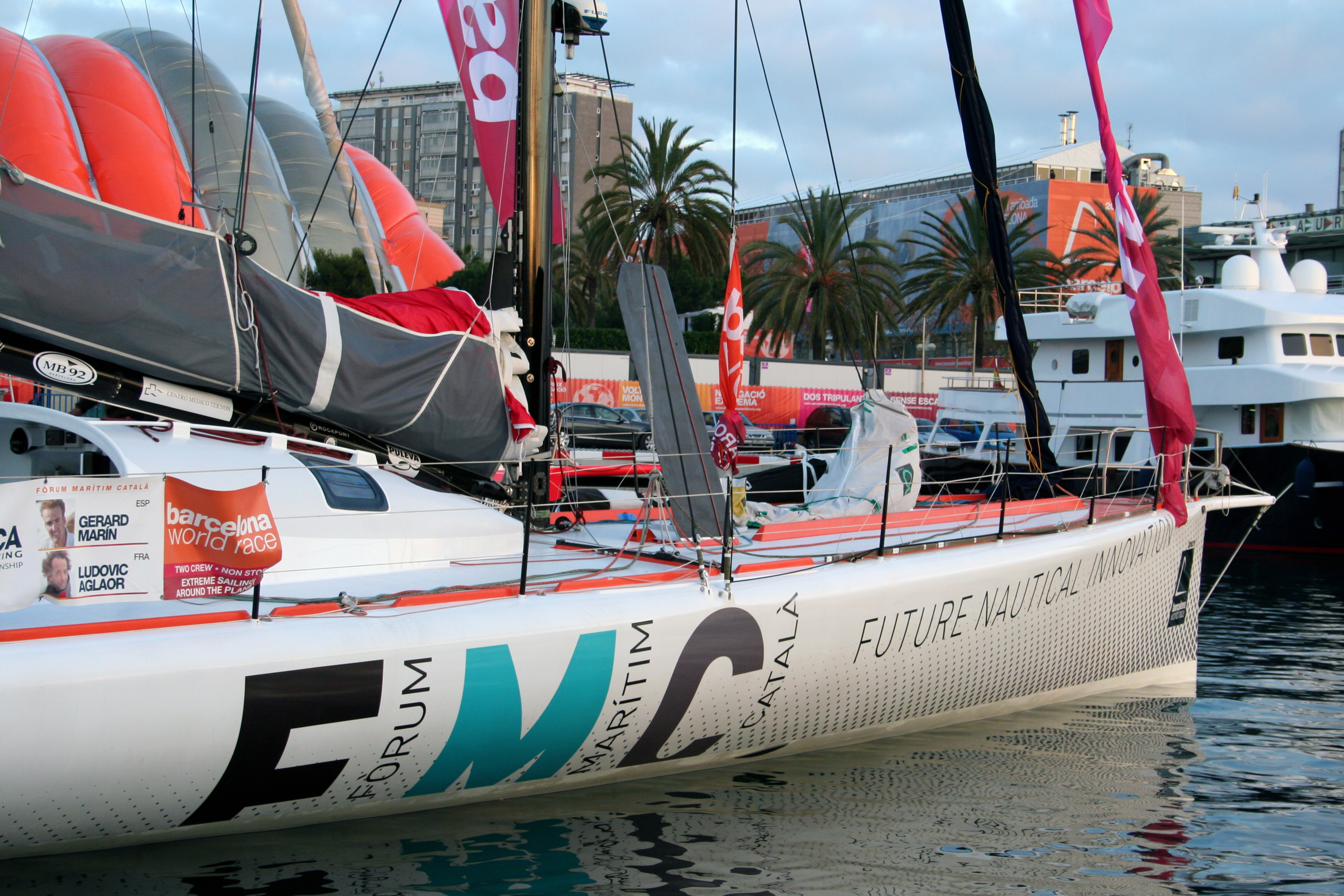

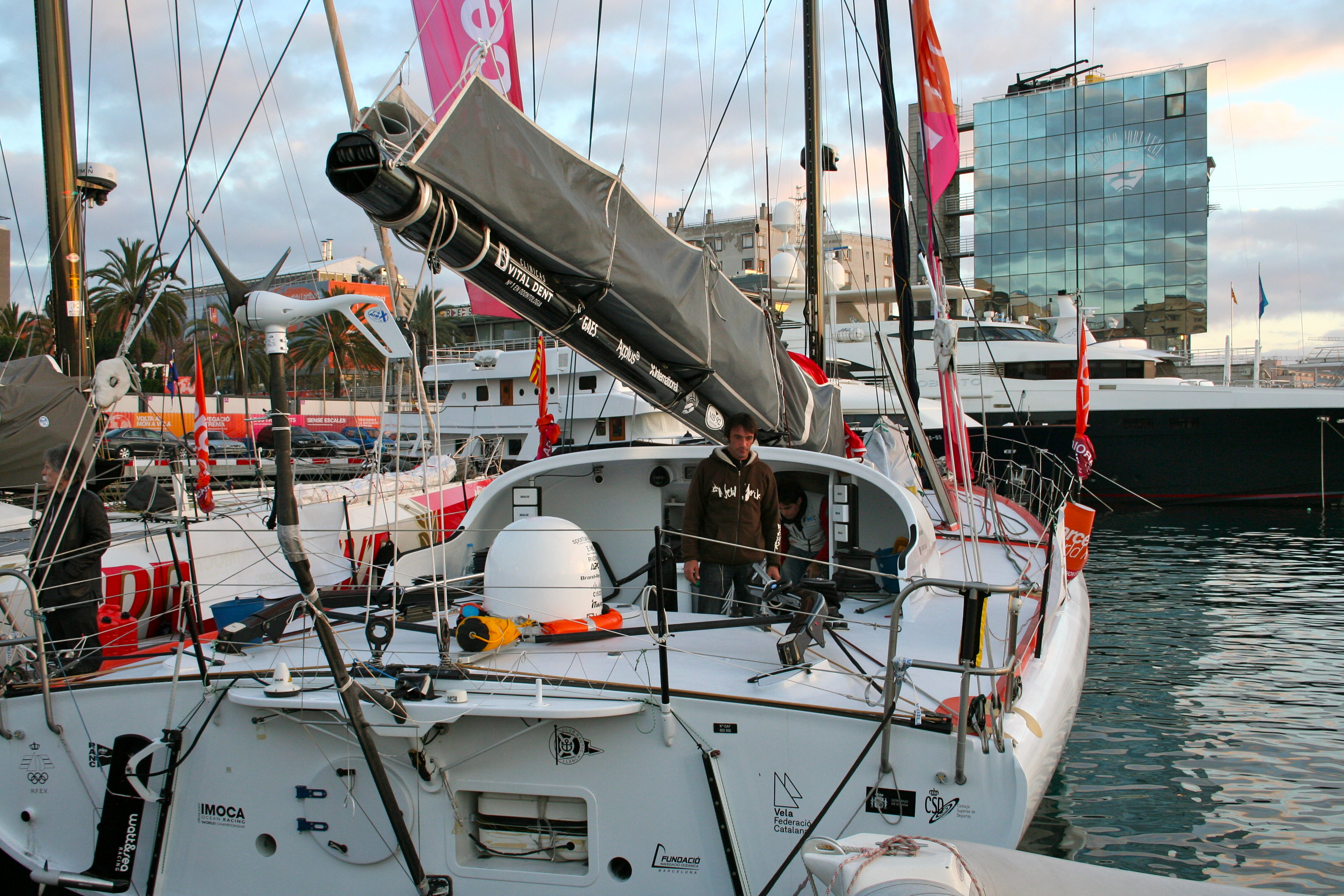

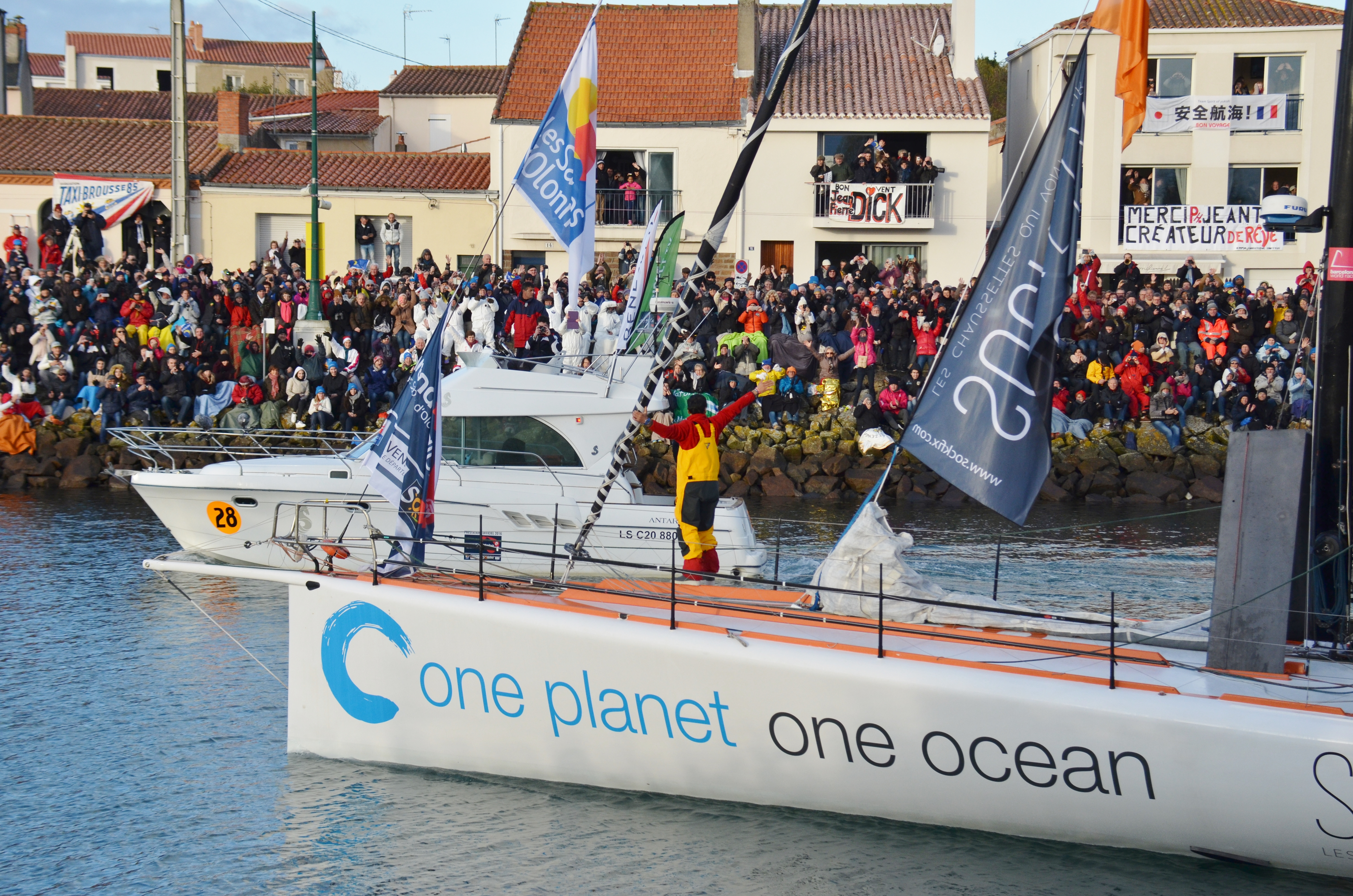

=== Kingfisher ===
The boat was commissioned by Offshore Challenges for Ellen for the 2000–2001 Vendée Globe.
