= Nick Moloney =

Australian yachtsman

Personal information
- Nationality: Australian
- Born: 5 May 1968 (age 57) Melbourne

Sport

Sailing career
- Class: IMOCA 60

Nick Moloney is an Australian professional yachtsman, born on 5 May 1968 in Melbourne, Australia. Having completed 3 circumnavigation and set 15 speed records and competed in pinnacle yachting events.

== Race result highlights ==
Pos	Year	Event	Class	Boat	Note	Ref
Round the World Race
7th	1997	1997–1998 Whitbread Round the World Race	Volvo 60	Toshiba	Skippered by Dennis Conner	
Abandon	2000	The Race	Maxi catamaran	PlayStation	Owned and skipper by Steve Fossett (USA)	
WR	2002	Jules Verne Trophy	Maxi catamaran	Orange	Skipper by Bruno Peyron (FRA)	
Abandon	2004	2004–2005 Vendée Globe	IMOCA 60	Skandia		
Trans Oceanic Races
3rd	2001	Transat Jacques Vabre	IMOCA 60	Casto-Darty-But	with Mark Turner (GBR)	
1	2002	Route du Rhum	IMOCA 50	Ashfield Healthcare		
5	2003	Défi Atlantique	IMOCA 60	Team Cowes		
6	2003	Transat Jacques Vabre	IMOCA 60	Team Cowes	with Samantha Davies (GBR)	
4	2004	2004 The Transat	IMOCA 60	Skandia		
Other Races
Eliminated	1992	1992 America's Cup Challenger Series	IACC	Team Australia		
Eliminated	1995	1995 America's Cup Challenger Series	IACC	One Australia	reached the challenger finals	
1st	1997	1997 Rolex Sydney-Hobart Race				
-	1998	First Person to Windsurfing across the Bass Strait in 22 hours				
1st	2001	2001 EDS Atlantic Challenge	IMOCA 60	Kingfisher	with Ellen MacArthur (GBR)	
6	2008	iShares Cup	Extreme 40	BT		
6	2009	iShares Cup	Extreme 40	BT		
-	2015	Windsurfing Hong Kong to Macau				

== Biography ==
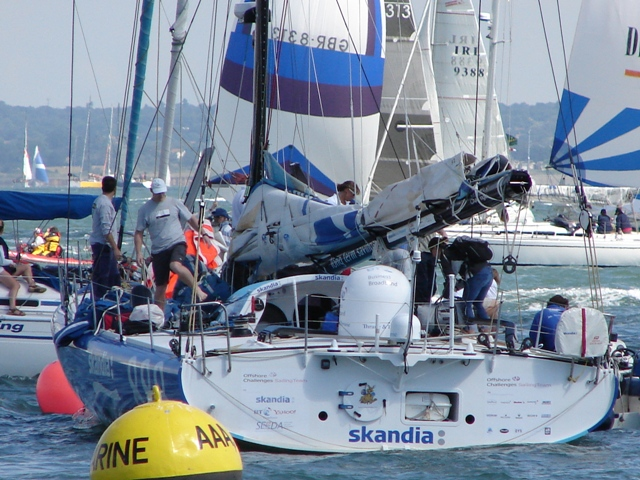
Skandia, 2005 Fastnet

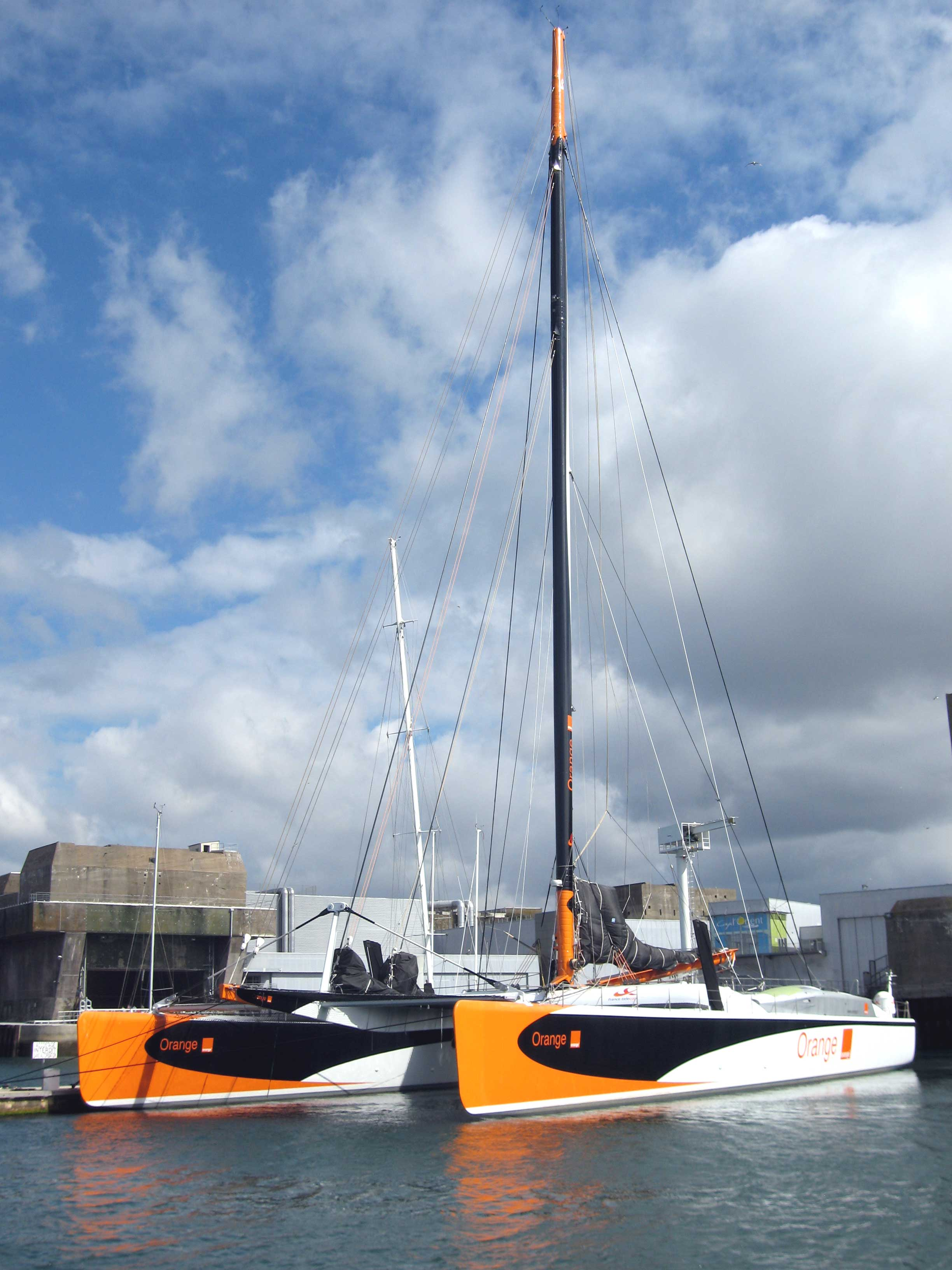
Orange II

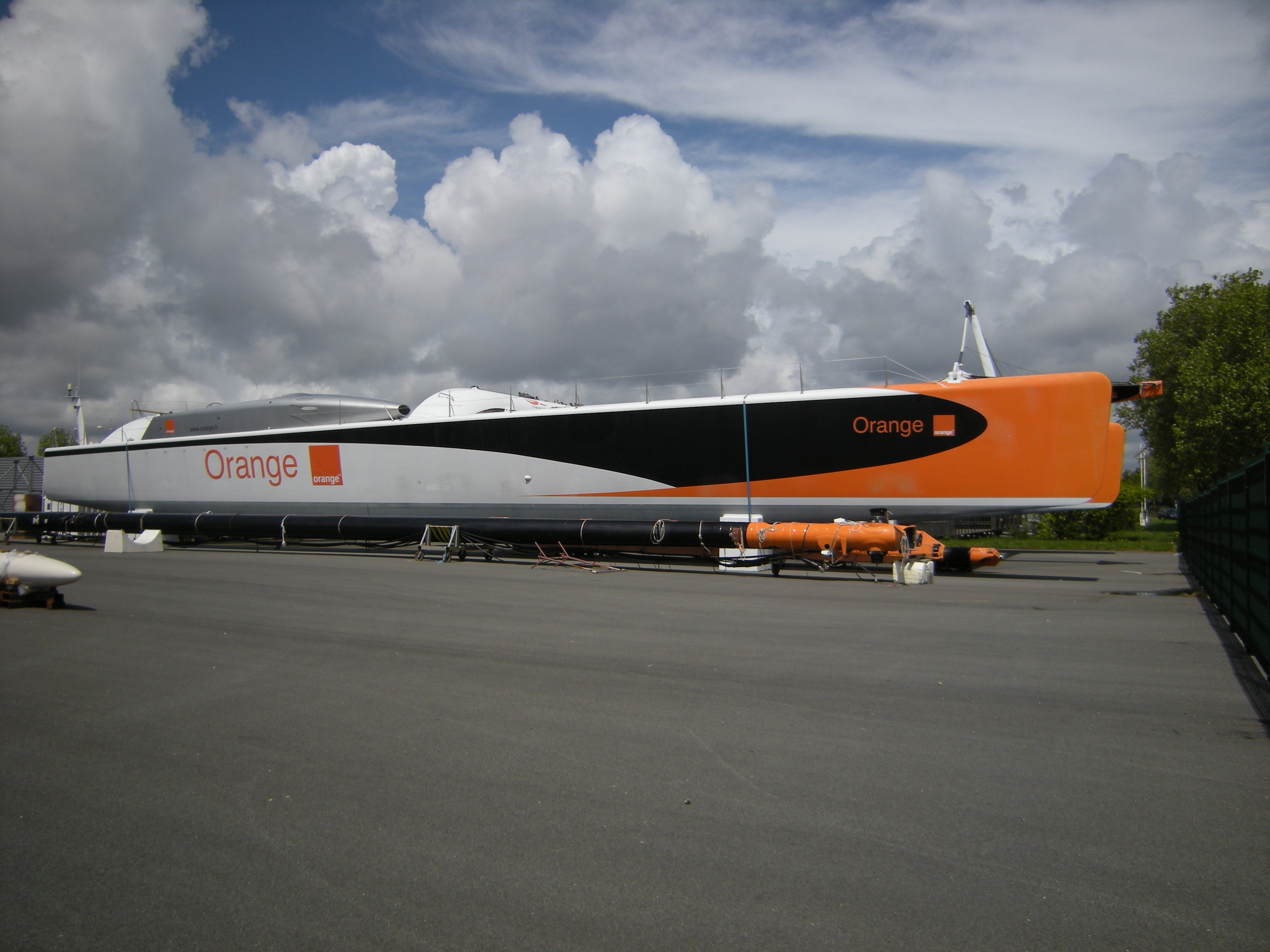
Orange II

He began his professional sailing career with two America's Cup campaigns in 1992 and 1995 alongside John Bertrand. At the Louis-Vuitton Cup in San Diego on 5 March 1995 the Australian boat One Australia sank during the fourth round.

He made his first round-the-world trip as a crew member on the American boat Toshiba a Volvo 60 competing in the 1997-98 Whitbread Round the World Race which was project managed by America Cup legend Dennis Conner who also became skipper for the later part of the race.

In 1998, he became the first to windsurfer across the Bass Strait, which lies between mainland Australia and Tasmania in a time of 22 hours.

In 2001, he won the EDS Atlantic Challenge on board the IMOCA 60, Kingfisher with Ellen MacArthur who skippered for the first three stages before Moloney himself took over skipper responsibilities. He later that year again on Kingfisher finished 3rd in the two person transatlantic race the Transat Jacques-Vabre.

In 2002 he was part of Bruno Peyron crew setting a new none stop round the world sailing record on the maxi catamaran Orange II. The time taken was 64 days 8 hours 37 minutes beating the previous record by more than a week and also claiming the Jules Verne Trophy.

In 2004 he started the 2004–2005 Vendée Globe on the IMOCA 60 called Skandia which previously completed the race under the name Kingfisher with Ellen MacArthur. He struggled with various technical issues culminating on 28 January 2005 having completed the majority of the race his keel fell off and he was forced to retire. He left the boat for repair in Brazil, then came back to pick up the boat several months later and unofficially complete the race course.

In 2020 at the age of 52 he announced he wanted to compete in proposed offshore mixed discipline at the 2024 Summer Olympics for Australia to be held in Marseille and was teaming up with high-profile offshore navigator Adrienne Cahalan.

== Books ==
Moloney, Nick (17 May 2004). Chasing the Dawn: Capturing the Trophee Jules Verne. Navigator Guides. p. 192. ISBN 978-1903872086.

== Film director ==
He directed a documentary Wild Colonial Boy released in Australia on 10 March 2000, which was filmed in Brittany and Gijon, Spain, recounting preparations for a crossing of the Atlantic.
