= Robert Janecki =

Polish yacht racer

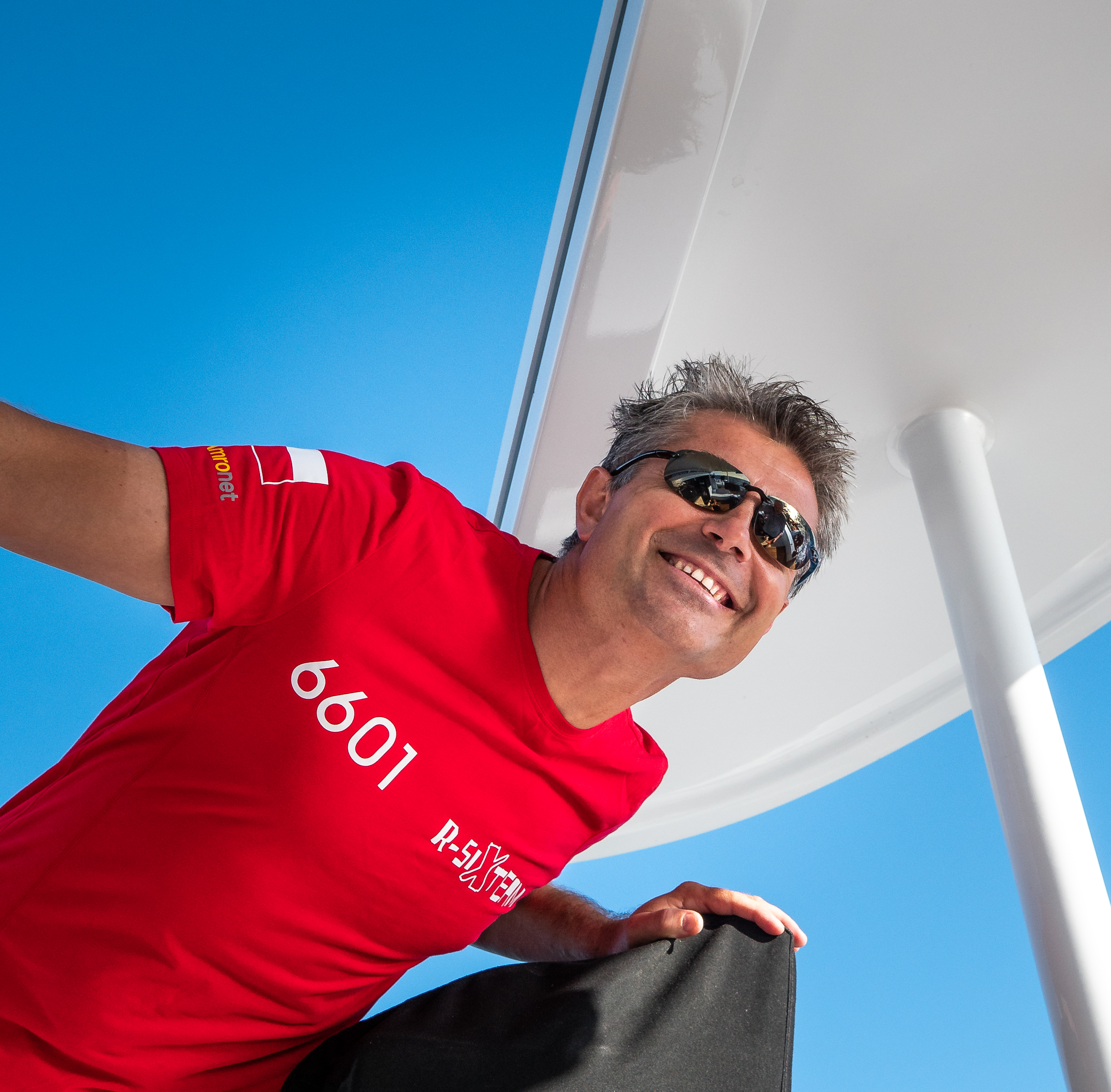
- Robert Janecki in 2017
- Born: July 27, 1974 (age 52); Mragowo

Robert Janecki (born 27 June 1974) is a Polish yachtsman.

He is an Ocean Yacht Master, Motorboat Master, navigator, routier. European champion class ILC 40 on the yacht MK Café with the crew led by Karol Jabłoński in 1998. Crew member of the catamaran Warta-Polpharma led by Roman Paszke in round the world yacht race The Race in 2000. Since 1999 member of the Race Team 2000 initiated by Roman Paszke. Between 2000 and 2004 journalist of the sailing magazine Rejs. Between 2005 and 2008 Polish National Sailing Team coach in Olympic class 470. Since 2010 has been leading the mountain biking team Renault Eco2 Team. He is also successful at other sports: mountain bike, long distance running, triathlon and ski running.

== Biography ==
Started sailing in 1983. In 1990 won the Polish Cup in Cadet class. In 1991 took 5th place in this class in the World Cup in Belgium. Between 1993 and 1995 was a crew member of the National Team in Olympic class 470 and represented the club BAZA Mrągowo, twice winning the Polish Junior Championship in class 470 during this time.

In 1998 he took first place in the European Championship in class ILC 40 in Italy on the yacht MK Café. In the same year and on the same yacht led by Karol Jabłoński took 5th place in the World Championship in Spain.

In 2000 he took part in the round the world sailing race The Race on the maxi-catamaran Warta-Polpharma. During sailing seasons 2002-2004 he was a helmsman in the Volkswagen Yacht Race Team. In class 730 he is a double Polish Champion and a triple Polish Cup winner. He is a four-time winner in Grand Prix class 730 (Match Racing formula). In 2004 he took part in the attempt to break the record in round the world sailing on the class VOR60 yacht Bank BPH.

Between 2005 and 2008 he was a Polish National Sailing Team coach in Olympic class 470.

He was helmsman and navigator on the yacht Gemini 3 led by Roman Paszke during the record passage under sail from Świnoujście to Gdynia (8 hours 55 minutes 50 seconds) in October 2009. Was helmsman and navigator on the yacht Gemini 3 led by Roman Paszke during the record passage under sail from Las Palmas to Guadelupe (8 days 2 hours 38 minutes 11 seconds) in January 2011.

In total, he is a four-time Polish Champion and a four-time winner of the Polish Cup in different classes. He has sailed altogether over 140,000 nautical miles in different passages, races and regattas.

Three-time winner of the 24-hour mountain biking marathon Mazovia 24H (2009–2011).

In 2013 he finished the Warsaw Marathon in 3 hours 17 minutes 14 seconds.

From 2016 skipper and helmsman on catamaran R-SIX.

== Achievements ==
Year	Achievement
1990	1st place Polish Cup Cadet Class.
1990	Wins 4 competitions Polish Cup Cadet Class
1991	2nd place Polish Cup Cadet Class
1991	5th place World Cup Cadet Class (Belgium)
1992	3rd place Polish Junior Championship Olympic Class 470
1992	10th place World Junior Championship Class 470 (Finland)
1993	1st place Polish Junior Championship Olympic Class 470
1993	1st place general scoring Polish Junior Cup Class 470
1995	1st place Polish Junior Championship Olympic Class 470
1995	3rd place Polish Senior Championship Olympic Class 470
1995	3rd place general scoring Polish Senior Cup Class 470
1997	Takes part in Olympic Campaign SYDNEY 2000 with Karol Jabłoński on catamaran TORNADO
1998	1st place European Championship Class ILC 40 (Italy, yacht MK CAFÉ)
1998	5th place World Championship Class ILC 40 (yacht MK CAFÉ)
1998	Record passage under sail from Świnoujście to Gdynia (13h 41min 11s, yacht ALKA_PRIM)
2000	Passage across Atlantic under sail (14 days 6h 30min 19s, catamaran POLPHARMA-WARTA)
2001	4th place round the world race The Race (catamaran Warta Polpharma, led by Roman Paszke)
2003-2004	Two-time winner Polish Championship Class 730
2002-2004	Three-time winner Polish Cup Class 730
2001-2004	Four-time winner Grand Prix Class 730 (Match Racing Formula)
2004	Attempt to break the record in round the world sailing on the VOR60 Class yacht Bank BPH (ex. Assa Abloy])
2005-2008	Polish National Sailing Team coach (men, women Olympic Class 470)
2016	1st place on catamaran R-SIX; Multihull Cup Mallorca
2017	3rd place on catamaran R-SIX; RORC Caribbean 600 - Antigua
2017	2nd place on catamaran R-SIX; Heineken Regatta - St. Maarten
2017	3rd place on catamaran R-SIX; Les Voiles De St. Barth - St. Barth
2017	1st place on catamaran R-SIX; Antigua Sailing Week - Antigua
2017	2nd place on catamaran R-SIX; class Multihull; Fastnet Race - Southampton
2018	2nd place on catamaran R-SIX; Les Voiles De St. Barth - St. Barth
2018	1st place on catamaran R-SIX; Antigua Sailing Week - Antigua
2018	2nd place on catamaran R-SIX; Multihull Cup - Mallorca
2018	1st place; s/y Husaria; class Section 02; Chicago-Mackinac Race
2019	2nd place on catamaran R-SIX; Caribbean Multihull Challenge - St.Maarten
2019	3rd place on catamaran R-SIX; Heineken Regatta - St. Maarten
2019	3rd place on catamaran R-SIX; Les Voiles De St. Barth - St. Barth
2019	1st place on catamaran R-SIX; Antigua Sailing Week - Antigua
2019	3rd place on catamaran R-SIX; Multihull Cup - Mallorca
2021	2nd place on catamaran R-SIX; Loro Piana - Porto Cervo
2021	3rd place on catamaran R-SIX; Multihull Cup - Mallorca
2022	2nd place on catamaran R-SIX; Multihull Cup - Mallorca

=== Records ===
Year	Record
1998	Record of Poland distance of 1 nm on the catamaran ALKA-PRIM
1998	Record route Świnoujście-Gdynia (along Polish coast) 13 hours 41min 11 seconds on the catamaran ALKA-PRIM
2009	Record Świnoujście-Gdynia (along Polish coast) 13 hours 07 minutes 40 seconds on the catamaran GEMINI 3
2009	Record Świnoujście-Gdynia (along Polish coast) 8 hours 55 minutes 50 seconds on the catamaran GEMINI 3
2011	Record on the Atlantic route from Las Palmas to Guadelupe 8 days 2 hours 38 minutes 11 seconds on the catamaran GEMINI 3

== Other achievements ==
Year	Achievement
2007	Technical Consultant of Maxi Catamran Bioton Project
2009	1st place – 24 hour mountain biking race, DUO (624 km, 26,3 km/h) – Mazovia 24H (Wieliszew)
2010	1st place – 24 hour mountain biking race, DUO (570 km, 22,3 km/h) – Mazovia 24H (Wieliszew)
2011	1st place – 24 hour mountain biking race, DUO (480 km, 20 km/h) – Mazovia 24H (Wieliszew)
2011	1st place team classification Poland Bike MTB Marathon
2012	4th place Polish Championship in the marathon MTB Medio cat.M3 (Dąbrowa Górnicza)
2012	3rd place Skandia Lang Team MTB distance MEDIO cat.M3 (Białystok)
2012	3rd place individual time trial, Mazovia MTB (Szczytno)
2013	Finished Warsaw Marathon - 3:17,14 s.
2014	Finished Warsaw Half marathon - 1:24,26 s.
2014	Finished Gdynia 10,000 metres - 37:24 s.
2014	Finished Garmin Iron Triathlon Goldap - 1/4 Ironman – 2:18,16 s.
2014	Finished Herbalife Triathlon Gdynia - 1/2 Ironman – 4:41,46 s.
2016	Technical Consultant of HH66 R-SIX Project

== Private life ==
Husband of Dorota, father of Gabriel and Michalina.
