= Energy Observer =

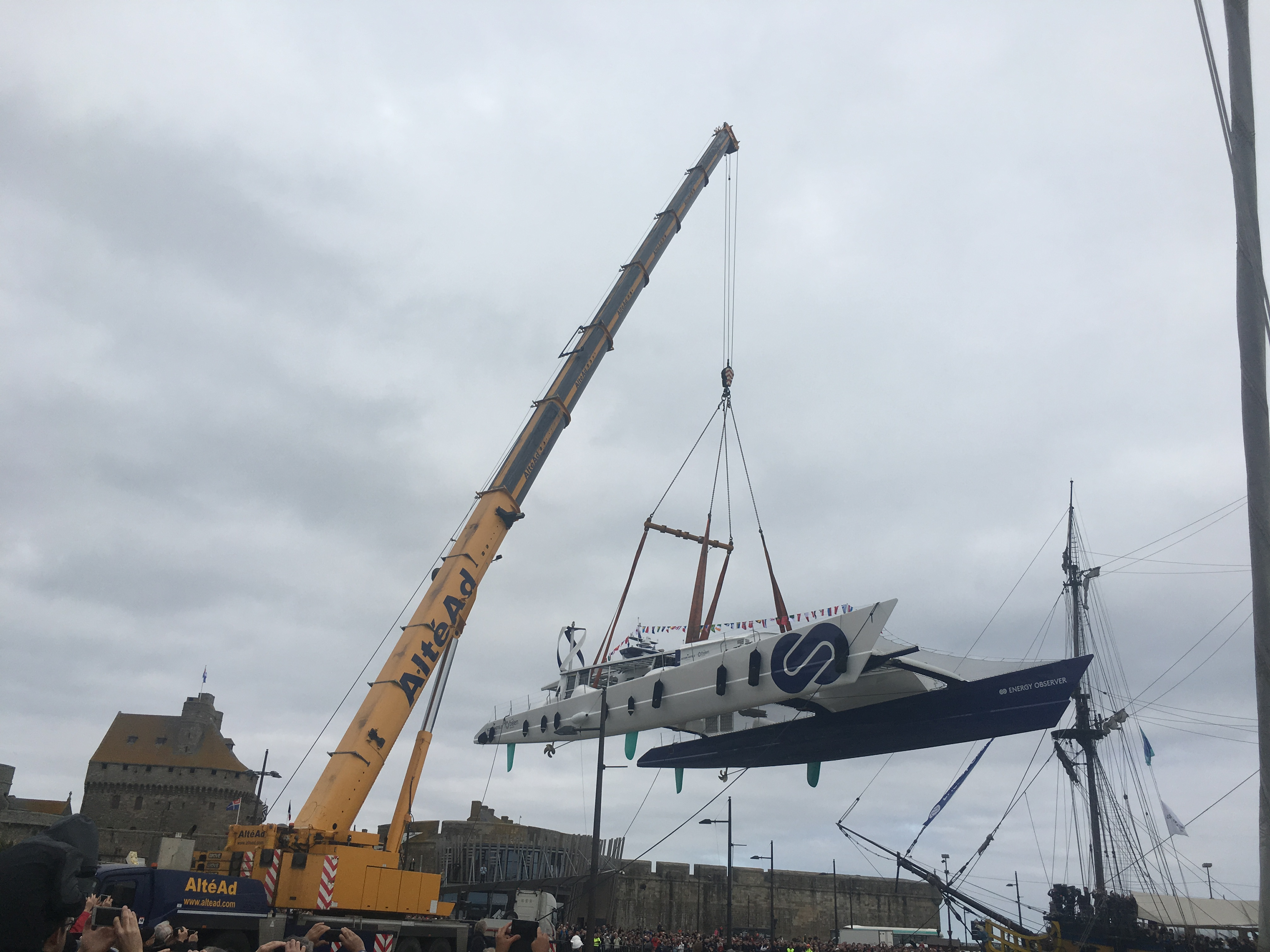
Energy Observer lifted during its launch in Saint-Malo, France

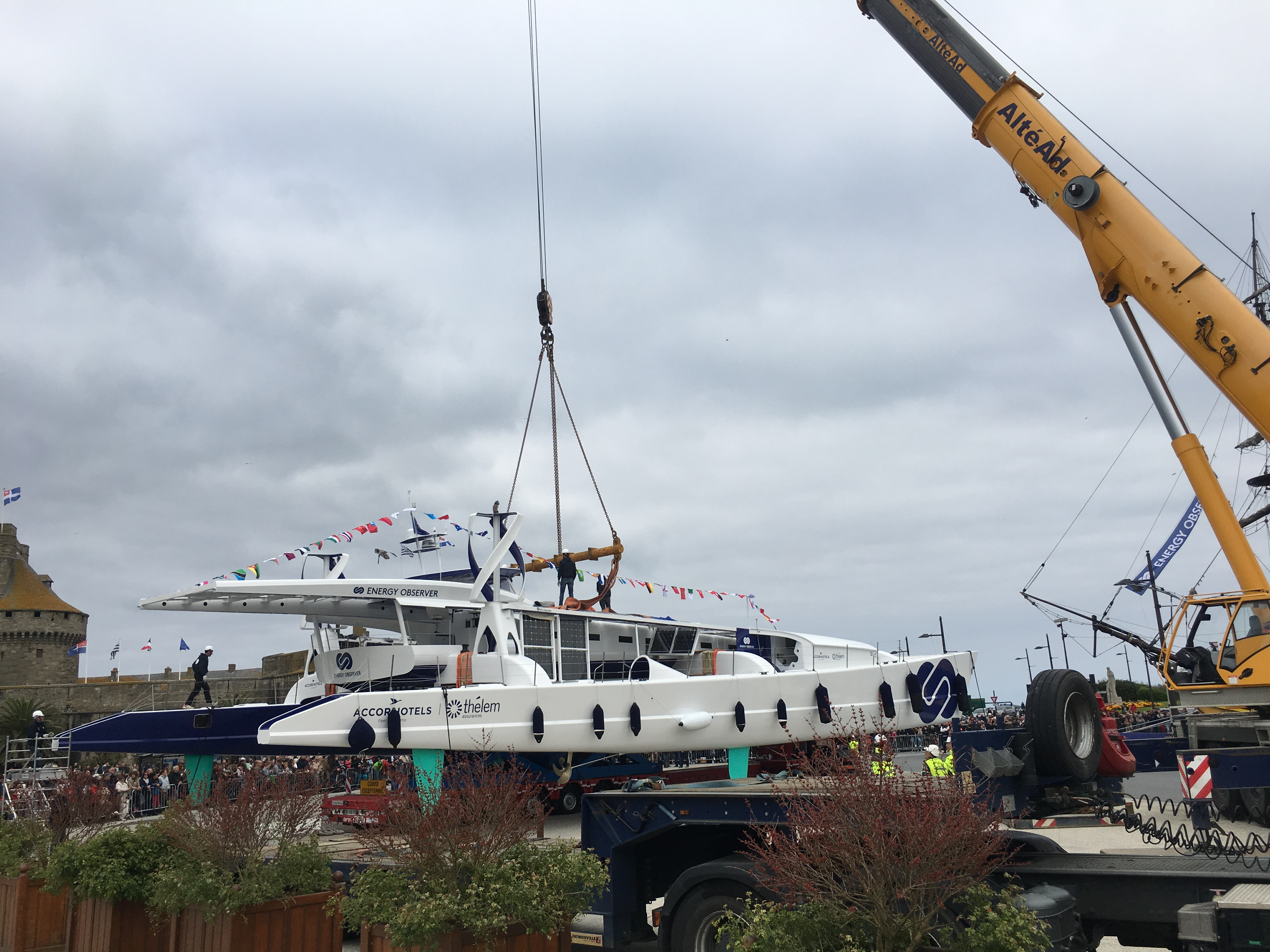
Energy Observer a few minutes before its launch in Saint-Malo, France.

Energy Observer, launched in April 2017, is the first vessel autonomous in energy thanks to a mix of renewable energy and renewable hydrogen produced onboard. Onboard hydrogeneration while sailing is possible, because 12 meter high Oceanwings have been mounted on the ship.

Energy Observer was developed in collaboration with engineers from the CEA-LITEN the boat will test and prove the efficiency of a full production chain that relies on the coupling of different renewable energies. Following its launch, the boat left in the Spring 2017 for a world tour lasting 7 years in order to optimize its technologies and lead an expedition that will serve durable solutions for energy transition. The boat was nominated first French ambassador of the Sustainable Development Goals by the French Ministry for an ecological and solidary transition.

== The project ==
=== The 1st hydrogen vessel around the world ===
Energy Observer is a project revolving around an experimental vessel and its expedition, that has for main purpose to find concrete, innovative, and successful solutions in favor of energy transition. Due to its technologies, it is the first vessel in the world capable of producing decarbonized hydrogen on board from sea water and using an energy mix relying on renewable energies. It is often nicknamed "Solar Impulse of the Seas", because the technologies developed hint to the solar project of Bertrand Piccard and André Borschberg, or even "Modern day Calypso", in regards to the displayed willingness of using the boat as a production platform for media content on ecology, sustainable development, and energy transition.

=== The scientific mission ===
Energy Observer is a floating laboratory, destined to test an innovative energy architecture in extreme conditions, to prove its feasibility onshore. The energy system encompasses 3 renewable energy sources (sun, wind and hydropower) and two types of storage (li-ion batteries for the short-term and hydrogen for the long-term). The ship can produce hydrogen directly onboard, through seawater electrolysis. The goal is to test and optimize these technological bricks, in order to have them working in harmony, and aim towards total energy autonomy. Each year, the vessel goes back to the shipyard to analyze the navigation and the evolution of the embarked technologies.

=== The team ===
Victorien Erussard, offshore racer and merchant naval officer, will lead the expedition, along with Jérôme Delafosse, professional diver and producer of wildlife documentaries.

By their side, a team of over 30 people, architects, designers, and engineers, spreading from Saint-Malo to Paris to Grenoble, have been working since 2015 on refurbishing the catamaran.

Energy Observer is a former race boat that has been reconditioned: Built in Canada in 1983 by naval architect Nigel Irens, under the supervision of sailor Mike Birch, the maxi-multihull marked the evolution of its successors. Baptised Formule TAG, it was the first racing sailboat to break the symbolic 500 miles limit in 24 hours in 1984. The boat has since been lengthened four times and now displays the following dimensions:

Length	30,5 metres
Width	12,80 metres
Weight	28 metric tons
Speed	8-10 knots

According to Victorien Erussard "Energy Observer is a conversion that has a double meaning: to recycle a reliable and lightweight catamaran which is an around the world record holder and to invest in research and development, instead of in composites".

== Technologies used ==
Designed in partnership with a naval architect team and the CEA-LITEN of Grenoble, this experimental vessel is going to be the first with autonomous means of producing hydrogen on board and without emitting greenhouse gas emissions using renewable energies. The boat will produce and store hydrogen using seawater thanks to an energy mix involving: 3 types of solar panels spreading over a surface of 130 square meters (21 kW peak), 2 vertical axis wind turbines (2 x 1 kW), 1 traction kite and 2 reversible electric motors (2x41 kW) of hydrogenation, 1 lithium battery (106 kWh), 1 desalinisator, 1 electrolyser, 1 compressor, 1 fuel cell (22 kW), and 62 kg of hydrogen. The complete hydrogen system weighs 2100 kilos. A new, lighter battery will be implemented in 2019.

== The expedition ==
Energy Observer launched in winter 2017 for a series of tests at sea before its big departure from Saint-Malo in the spring. It will call in at Paris for a first event where the boat will be officially baptised. This event will celebrate the start of a six-year expedition, scheduled from 2017 to 2022, visiting 50 countries and 101 ports of call including: historical ports, wildlife sanctuaries, natural reserves, endangered ecosystems, and international events. Expedition goals include reconciling ecology and technology, and proving that it is possible to reduce our impact on the environment without reducing our comfort.

== Similar projects ==
Energy Observer joins a vein of big projects for research and development sharing a calling for technology, society and the environment and carrying a message in favour of renewable energies. In this vein we can also name the polar schooner Tara, that has travelled across the oceans since 2007 for science and the protection of the environment, Solar Impulse, the first solar plane, or even Planet Solar which became the first solar electric vehicle ever to circumnavigate the globe in 2010. In October 2016, the foundation Race for Water Odyssey announced that it was introducing hydrogen technology to the Planet Solar catamaran utilising solely solar energy, for an expedition around the world with similar ambitions to the Energy Observer project.
Planned, but not yet realized ships with hydrogen fuel production aboard with renewable energies are the "orcelle". This ferry should be the "green flagship" of the Wallenius Wilhelmsen Logistics, a Norwegian-Swedish shipping Company. She uses sun and wave energy to produce hydrogen aboard for propulsion of the vessel. Another hydrogen ship, also not realized so far, is the deepsea yacht "eco trimaran", using also the energy of sun and waves. Wind energy is utilized not by sails, but by a wind turbine. So this energy source may also contribute to hydrogen production aboard, even in mooring times.
