= Cole Brauer =

American sailor (born 1994)

- Born: May 24, 1994 (age 32); Long Island, New York
- Education: University of Hawaiʻi at Mānoa
- Occupation: Sailor
- Known for: First American female single-handed non-stop circumnavigation of the globe

Cole Brauer (born May 24, 1994) is an American sailor. She was the first woman from the United States to race single-handed around the world nonstop.

== Early life ==
Brauer grew up on Long Island, New York, and graduated from East Hampton High School in 2012. She attended the University of Hawaiʻi at Mānoa, where she studied nutritional science and competed for the college's sailing team, later becoming the team's captain. Although she initially planned to become a doctor, she decided to become a sailor after learning the sport in college.

== Sailing ==
After graduating, Brauer moved to Boothbay, Maine, where she currently lives. There, she began teaching at Boothbay Harbor Yacht Club, and working as a sailor to deliver boats on the Atlantic Coast.

In 2018, Brauer earned her 100Ton Captain's License.

In June 2023, Brauer and her co-skipper, Cat Chimney, won both legs of the 668-nautical mile Bermuda One-Two race from Rhode Island to Bermuda and back, the first women to do so since the race's inception.

She finished 2nd in the 2023–2024 Global Solo Challenge on March 7, 2024, sailing a Class40 boat named First Light, making her the first woman from the United States to sail single-handed around the world nonstop and unassisted, and also setting a new around-the-world speed record for the class. She had started the race on October 29, 2023, and was the only woman and the youngest among the 16 competitors. During the 130 days on her boat, she injured a rib, suffered dehydration, and gave herself IV fluids. She was able to connect to the Internet via Starlink satellites, and established an influential social media presence, introducing a new audience to the sport.

She also trains in Newport, Rhode Island in the summer.

== Awards ==
Brauer received Mystic Seaport Museum’s America and the Sea Award for 2024. She also received US Sailing's 2024 Rolex Yachtswoman of the Year award.

== Other ==
She published her memoir, First Light: Sailing Solo But Not Alone, in 2026.
