= Warta Polpharma =

- Other names: Jet Service V Commodore Explorer; Explorer
- Designer(s): Gilles Ollier
- Builder: Multiplast
- Launched: 1987

Racing career
- Skippers: Serge Madec; Bruno Peyron; Roman Paszke

Specifications
- Displacement: 10.50 t (10.33 long tons; 11.57 short tons)
- Length: 26.30 m (86.3 ft) (LOA)
- Beam: 13.60 m (44.6 ft)
- Mast height: 31 m (102 ft)
- Sail area: 300 m^{2} (3,200 sq ft) (upwind); 777 m^{2} (8,360 sq ft) (downwind)
- Crew: 4

Warta Polpharma is a maxi-catamaran, that participated in many major offshore races.

Its different names were :

- Jet Service V (1987-1992), skippered by Serge Madec
- Commodore Explorer (from 1993), skippered by Bruno Peyron
- Explorer, skippered by Bruno Peyron
- Warta Polpharma (since 2000), skippered by Roman Paszke for The Race.

== Records ==
- Under the name Jet Service V: Transatlantic sailing record for 11 years, between 1988 and 2001.
- Under the name Commodore Explorer : Winner of the Jules Verne Trophy (fastest round the world) in 1993 in 79 days 6 hours 15 minutes and 56 seconds, with skipper Bruno Peyron and router Pierre Lasnier, with an average speed of 11.35 knots.
- Under the name Warta Polpharma : Finished 4th of The Race in 2000, with skipper Roman Paszke and crew: Robert Janecki, Mariusz Pirjanowicz, Wojciech Dlugozima, Ryszard Block, Dariusz Drapella, Zbigniew Gutkowski, Jaroslaw Kaczorowski, Piotr Cichocki.

Records
Preceded by First holder	Jules Verne Trophy; 1993–1994	Succeeded by ENZA New Zealand with Knox-Johnston & Blake
