= The Highlands School, Reading =

The Highlands School
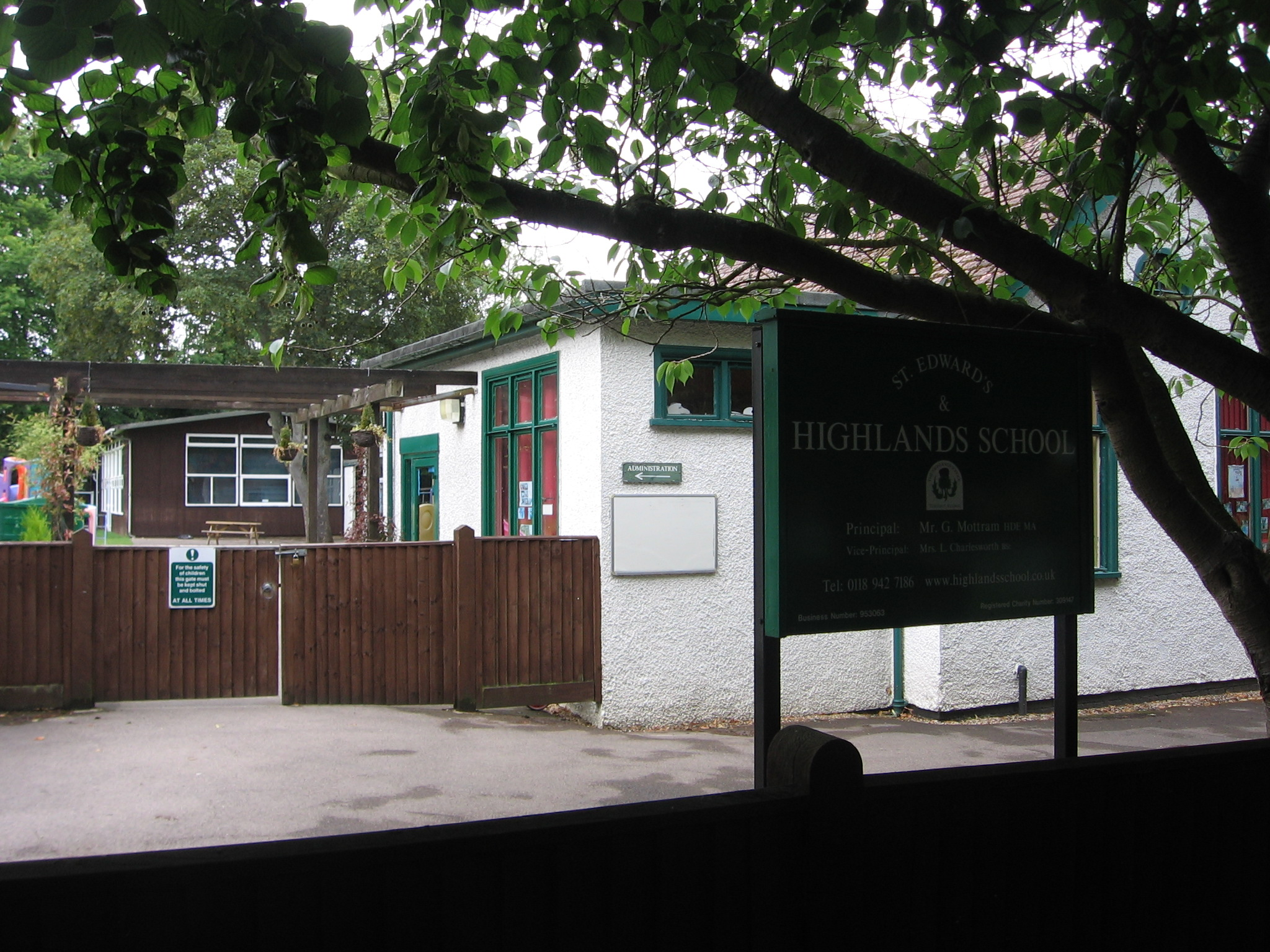
- Reading; England

Information
- Established: 1929
- Closed: 2011
- Colours: Emerald green, Purple
- Emblem: Thistle

The Highlands School was an independent primary school in Reading, Berkshire, England. For most of its history the school was located in Wardle Avenue, Tilehurst. Highlands admitted both boys and girls in the lower years, but the upper forms were girls only.

The school was founded in 1929 and closed in July 2011.

== Notable former pupils ==
Notable former pupils include Mike Oldfield, Minette Walters and Tracy Edwards.
