= Team Philips =

- Designer(s): Adrian Thomson and Paragon Mann
- Builder: Goss Challenge; Dartmouth, England
- Launched: 29 February 2000

Racing career
- Skippers: Pete Goss

Specifications
- Type: Catamaran

Team Philips was a catamaran sailing vessel built for a challenge to take yachtsman Pete Goss around the world in record time.

The design consisted of two thin, wave piercing hulls, each with its own sail, connected by high placed bridges between the hulls to minimise wave drag. It was built in Totnes, Devon, England to compete in The Race, a no-holds-barred drag race around the world. It was the biggest ocean racing yacht ever built, and there was enough space between the hulls to park 80 cars. Overall dimensions were 120 ft long (37 m), 70 ft wide (21 m) and 135 ft tall (41 m).

It pushed the boundaries and challenged the norms of ocean racing yachts in three main ways:

1. 40-foot (12 m) unsupported wave-piercing bow sections.
2. huge unstayed windsurfer-style rig.
3. two masts mounted abeam of each other (side by side), one on each hull.

It initially ran into trouble during its trials in March 2000 due to errors in the computer modelling of the composite hull. The first 40 feet (12 m) of the port hull broke off. It was repaired with the addition of internal bracing. It then suffered from problems with the pioneering bearings that supported the 130-foot-tall (40 m) masts which required further repairs.

It was abandoned during a freak storm in the mid-Atlantic in December 2000. 70-knot (130 km/h) winds and 10-metre (33 ft) waves started to produce cracks in the crew's central safety pod and forced Pete Goss to send out a mayday signal. The crew were forced to abandon the vessel, which broke up several days later.
