= Peter Blake (sailor) =

New Zealand yachtsman

Sir Peter Blake KBE
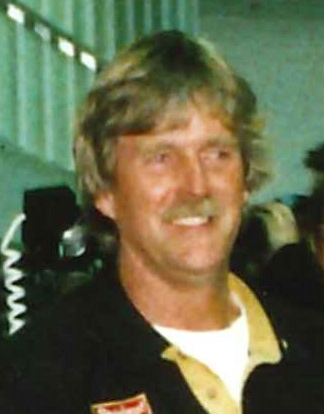
- Blake in 2000

Personal information
- Born: Peter James Blake; 1 October 1948 Auckland, New Zealand
- Died: 5 December 2001 (aged 53) Macapá, Brazil
- Spouse: Pippa Jane Glanville (m. 1979)

Sport
- Country: New Zealand
- Sport: Sailing
- Events: America's Cup; Whitbread Round the World
- Team: Team New Zealand

Sir Peter James Blake KBE (1 October 1948 – 5 December 2001) was a New Zealand yachtsman and adventurer who won the 1989–1990 Whitbread Round the World Race, held the Jules Verne Trophy from 1994 to 1997 by setting the around the world sailing record as co-skipper of ENZA New Zealand along with Sir Robin Knox-Johnston, and led New Zealand to successive victories in the America's Cup.

Blake was shot and killed by pirates while monitoring environment change on the Amazon River on 5 December 2001. He was 53 years old.

== Early life and education ==
Blake was born in 1948 in Auckland to artist and art director Brian Blake and photography engraver Joyce Wilson. He was the second of their four children. He grew up in the suburb of Bayswater on Auckland's North Shore, and was educated at Bayswater School, Belmont Intermediate and Takapuna Grammar School.

Blake was passionate about sailing from an early age; he began sailing at the age of five in the family dinghy. At age 18, he and his brother built a keel yacht and won the 1967/68 New Zealand Junior Offshore Group Championship.

From 1966 to 1969, Blake studied mechanical engineering at the Auckland Technical Institute, and gained the New Zealand Certificate of Engineering.

== Sailing career ==
In 1971, Blake began his international sailing career as watch leader on Ocean Spirit in the Cape Town to Rio de Janeiro race. Ocean Spirit won the race. The co-skippers of the yacht, Leslie Williams and Robin Knox-Johnston, recognised Blake's abilities in leadership and seamanship and invited him to join their team for the first Whitbread Round the World Race.

=== Whitbread Round the World Race ===
Blake raced in the 1973–1974 Whitbread Round the World Race as watch captain on board the Burton Cutter skippered by Leslie Williams and Alan Smith. In the 1977–1978 race, Blake rejoined Williams and co-skipper Johnston on board Heaths Condor. While refitting the yacht in England after the race, Peter met Philippa (Pippa) Glanville and they married in Emsworth in August 1979.

For the 1981–1982 race, Blake mounted his own campaign as skipper of Ceramco New Zealand, a 68-foot (21 m) sloop designed by an up-and-coming naval architect called Bruce Farr. The campaign started well, but Ceramco lost its mast on the first leg, and Blake's crew did well to finish the race in third place. He returned for the 1985–1986 race as one of the race favourites, skipper of Lion New Zealand, sponsored by the Lion Brewery, and came second.

He won the 1989–1990 Whitbread race, where he skippered Steinlager 2 to an unprecedented clean sweep of line, handicap and overall honours on each of the race's six legs.

=== Jules Verne trophy ===
In 1994, Blake and his co-skipper Robin Knox-Johnson succeeded in their second attempt at the Jules Verne Trophy, by achieving the fastest non-stop navigation of the world under sail on the yacht ENZA New Zealand. Their first attempt in 1993 had foundered after the yacht struck an unidentified floating object 26 days into the attempt. Their time was 74 days, 22 hours, 17 minutes and 22 seconds, and they were the first foreign skippers to win the French award.

=== America's Cup ===
Brought in at the last minute by Carl McKenzie to manage New Zealand's 1992 America's Cup challenge, Blake led the Kiwi team to the challenger finals with NZL-20. However, Italy emerged from the controversial series with the Louis Vuitton Cup, and went on to face America³ in the America's Cup match.

Blake was back for the 1995 America's Cup challenge, this time as the syndicate head of Team New Zealand. With NZL 32, "Black Magic", the team made a clean sweep, beating Dennis Conner 5–0. Blake's "lucky red socks" (a present from his wife) became something of a trademark. It was commonplace to see New Zealanders wear red socks or fly them from car aerials during the Cup races and a highly successful "fundraising edition" of official red socks emblazoned with the sail numbers of the two NZL yachts was produced to help fund the syndicate. Subsequently, following his murder, red socks became a badge of mourning to his many admirers.

In the 2000 America's Cup, Team New Zealand, still led by Blake, became the first non-American team to successfully defend the America's Cup, beating Prada 5–0. Following this defence, Blake stood down from the team.

Blake was inducted into the America's Cup Hall of Fame in 1996.

== Post racing ==
In 1997, Blake became the Cousteau Society's head of expeditions, and skipper of the Antarctic Explorer, which he later purchased from the Society and renamed Seamaster. After leaving the Society he led expeditions to Antarctica and the Amazon aboard Seamaster during 2001. The same year Blake was named Special Envoy for the UN Environment Programme. He began filming documentaries for 'blakexpeditions', a company he founded.

== Honours and awards ==
In the 1983 New Year Honours, Blake was appointed a Member of the Order of the British Empire (MBE), for services to ocean yacht racing. In the 1991 New Year Honours, he was promoted to Officer of the Order of the British Empire (OBE), for services to yachting, and he was further promoted to Knight Commander of the same Order (KBE) in the 1995 Queen's Birthday Honours.

Blake received an honorary doctorate in 1999 from Massey University, and another in 2000 from Auckland University of Technology.

== Death and legacy ==
On 5 December 2001, pirates shot and killed Blake while he was on an environmental exploration trip in South America, monitoring global warming and pollution for the United Nations. The two-month expedition was anchored off Macapá, Brazil, at the mouth of the Amazon delta, waiting to clear customs after a trip up the Amazon river. At around 9 p.m. a group of six to eight armed, masked robbers wearing balaclavas and crash helmets boarded the Seamaster. As one of the robbers held a gun to the head of a crewmember, Blake sprang from the cabin wielding a rifle. He shot one of the assailants in the hand before the rifle malfunctioned; he was then fatally shot in the back by assailant Ricardo Colares Tavares. The boarders injured two other crew members with knives, and the remaining seven were unhurt.

The only thing seized by the attackers was a 15 hp outboard motor and some watches from the crew. Authorities eventually captured the pirates and sentenced them to an average of 32 years in prison each; Tavares, the man who fired the fatal shots, received a sentence of 36 years. Prior to the attack, the yacht's crew had been very careful when travelling up the river and back down again; they always had crew members on watch. Only upon return to Macapa did they relax their guard.

Blake is survived by his wife Pippa, Lady Blake, and their two children Sarah-Jane and James. Blake's sister's daughter Anna Burnet is also a sailor and an Olympic Silver medallist. Blake's environmental and leadership legacy is continued by The Sir Peter Blake Trust, a non-profit organisation based in New Zealand.

Around 30,000 people attended a memorial service held for Blake at the Auckland Domain on 23 December 2001, and included tributes from Blake's family, the New Zealand Prime Minister Helen Clark, the Brazilian Ambassador, and Neil and Tim Finn. Helen Clark spent a night aboard the Seamaster three weeks prior to the attack. She called Blake a "living legend" and a "national hero". In her eulogy she said in part: "Our small nation went into shock. Peter Blake was a living legend. As an outstanding sailor, he had brought great honour and fame to New Zealand. His death was unthinkable."

Blake is buried at Warblington Cemetery, located opposite St Thomas a Becket Church near Emsworth on the south coast of England. Emsworth is where Pippa and Peter settled and raised their two children. His headstone bears the words of John Masefield's famous poem, Sea-Fever: "I must go down to the seas again, to the lonely sea and the sky, / And all I ask is a tall ship and a star to steer her by...".

In October 2002, the International Olympic Committee posthumously awarded the Olympic Order, one of its highest honours, to Blake. In December 2003, the Sir Peter Blake Trust was established, with the support of the Blake family, "to help New Zealanders make a positive difference for the planet through activities that encourage environmental awareness and action, and leadership development."

The Trust has a range of initiatives, including the annual Sir Peter Blake Leadership Awards. These awards consist of the Blake Medal, awarded each year to an outstanding New Zealand leader, and the Sir Peter Blake Emerging Leader Awards, presented annually to six people recognised as younger leaders of considerable potential. The winners of the Blake Medal, in order starting 2005, are John Anderson, Stephen Tindall, Paul Callaghan, Murray Halberg, John Hood (university administrator), Ray Avery, Margaret Bazley, John Graham, Mick Brown, Peter Jackson, Rob Fenwick, Peter Gluckman, Mason Durie and Tariana Turia.

Seamaster was originally built in France. After Blake's death she was eventually purchased by Étienne Bourgois and renamed Tara expedition. She continues to undertake successful expeditions.

In 2002, the Sir Peter Blake Marine Education and Recreation Centre was named in honour of Blake.

The Sir Peter Blake Regatta is held annually in celebration of Blake's life. It is the largest youth centreboard regatta in the southern hemisphere.

Blake Massif is named after Blake.

Awards
Preceded by Richard Hadlee	New Zealand's Sportsman of the Year; 1990	Succeeded by Martin Crowe
Preceded by Erin Baker	Halberg Awards – Supreme Award; 1990	Succeeded by Philippa Baker
Records
Preceded by Explorer with Bruno Peyron	Jules Verne Trophy; 1994–1997	Succeeded by Sport Elec with Olivier de Kersauson
