= The Race (yachting race) =

The Race was a round-the-world sailing race that started in Barcelona, Catalonia, Spain, on December 31, 2000.

The race was created by Bruno Peyron, and it was the first ever non-stop, no-rules, no-limits, round-the-world sailing event, with a $2 million US prize.

The stated objectives of this race were:

- to unite the different maritime cultures of the world
- to gather together the world's premiere yachtsmen and women in a common event
- to promote creativity in ocean sailing
- to ally high technology and the environment
- to create the most spectacular and most prestigious fleet of offshore racers that sailing has ever seen

A second race was planned for 2004, but was cancelled amid controversy that Tracy Edwards had organised a competing event called Oryx Quest.

== Results ==
The 2000–01 race was won by Club Med, skippered by Grant Dalton in 62d 6h 56' 33".

Pos	Boat name	Crew	Country	Time
1	Club Med	Grant Dalton	New Zealand	62d 6h 56m 33s
2	Innovation Explorer	Loick Peyron & Skip Novak	France	64d 22h 32m 38s
3	Team Adventure	Cam Lewis	United States	82d 20h 21m 02s
4	Warta Polpharma	Roman Paszke	Poland	99d 12h 31m
5	Team Legato	Tony Bullimore	Great Britain	104d 20h 52m
–	PlayStation	Steve Fossett	United States	DNF (Note: Damaged and forced to withdraw on day 16)
–	Team Philips	Pete Goss	Great Britain	DNS

Legend: DNF – Did not finish; DNS – Did not start;

== See also ==
- Jules Verne Trophy
