= Oryx Quest =

Round-the-world yacht race

Oryx Quest was the name of the first round-the-world yacht race to start and finish in the Middle East and was held in February 2005 in Qatar.

The race, organised by British sailor Tracy Edwards, was regarded as a follow-up to The Race of 2000 and was designed to complement existing Multihull races. It was hoped that the size of the prize and the potential speed of the participating boats would make it the most-exciting round-the-world race to date. Record prize money of $1 million was offered by Qatar Sports International which was headed by Sheikh Tamim bin Hamad bin Khalifa Al Thani, the Heir Apparent of Qatar, which hoped to gain publicity as a tourism destination. The prize money however, along with the £6 million sponsorship was never paid by Qatar Sports International.

On 5 February four multihulled yachts began the route, off Doha.

== Entries ==
The participants were:

- Doha 2006, catamaran, formerly Club Med (winner of The Race), skippered by Brian Thompson.
- Daedalus, catamaran, formerly Enza (winner of the 1995 Jules Verne Trophy), skippered by Tony Bullimore.
- Geronimo, trimaran, (winner of the 2004 Jules Verne Trophy), skippered by Olivier de Kersauson.
- Cheyenne, catamaran, formerly PlayStation, (holder of the world record for circumnavigations at the time of the start of Oryx Quest), skippered by David Scully.

== Results ==
Pos	Boat name	Crew	Country	Time
1	Doha 2006	Brian Thompson	Great Britain	62d 21h 1m 22s
2	Daedalus	Tony Bullimore	Great Britain	75d 0h 20m 48s
–	Cheyenne	David Scully	United States	DNF
–	Geronimo	Olivier de Kersauson	France	DNF

Legend: DNF – Did not finish;

== Race ==
Geronimo was the first elimination on 2 March, as a result of hull damage following a collision with flotsam. de Kersauson returned to Australia to have the boat repaired, and to break the record for the circumnavigation of the continent in July. A week later the mast of Cheyenne broke just after the boat had rounded Cape Horn. With two remaining boats, Doha 2006 won the race, finishing with an overall time of 62 days, 21 hours and 1 minute. The more-than-20-year-old Daedalus crossed the finishing line some 13 days later.

== Media coverage ==
Media coverage in the Middle East, Far East and Asia (Qatar's key target markets) was valued at $46 million and the weekly race programmes by APP were seen in 600 million homes, making it the most widely watched race in yachting history. The website made by Sycamore including the children's 'Ali the Albatross' education pages received over 20 million hits. Tracy and her team also put together Qatar's first Sports Education Programme to which over 10,000 Qatari school children signed up.

== Financial fiasco ==
HSBC paid £3 million towards the event and Edwards personally borrowed £8 million to pay suppliers, her team and each of the competitors was paid between $1 million and $2 million each to enter (the first time a yacht race has managed to do this). However, Qatar Sports International reneged on the £6 million sponsorship deal and $1 million prize money and Edwards was consequently forced into bankruptcy and lost her home. She was discharged in September 2005. Edwards' legal team in Qatar won the first stage of her legal action in Qatar on 31 January 2006. Legal action to recover monies owed to Quest, its suppliers and Edwards herself is still ongoing.

== Criticism ==
Organiser Edwards was criticised by Bruno Peyron for splitting the field of potential participants by insisting on her own event, so that as a result Peyron was not able to recruit enough participants for his own event: a second edition of The Race. He won the 2005 Jules Verne Trophy instead, improving the record for circumnavigation which had previously been held by Cheyenne.
