= Didac Costa =

Ocean racing yachtsman (born 1980)

Personal information
- Born: 20 December 1980 (age 45) Barcelona, Spain

Sport

Sailing career
- Class: IMOCA 60 / Classe Mini
- Club: Real Club Marítimo de Barcelona

Dídac Costa (born 22 December 1980 in Barcelona, Spain) is a yachtsman who competes in ocean racing. He was the first Catalan and the second Spanish yachtsman to finish the Vendée Globe, the non-stop solo round-the-world sailing world race. He was the first Spanish yachtsman to complete the two IMOCA 60 class round-the-world yacht races: solo in the 2016–2017 Vendée Globe and double-handed at the Barcelona World Race 2014–15. He is the protagonist of the feature documentary Open Ocean (2021), which chronicles his 2016-17 and 2020-21 Vendée Globe campaigns.

Nationality

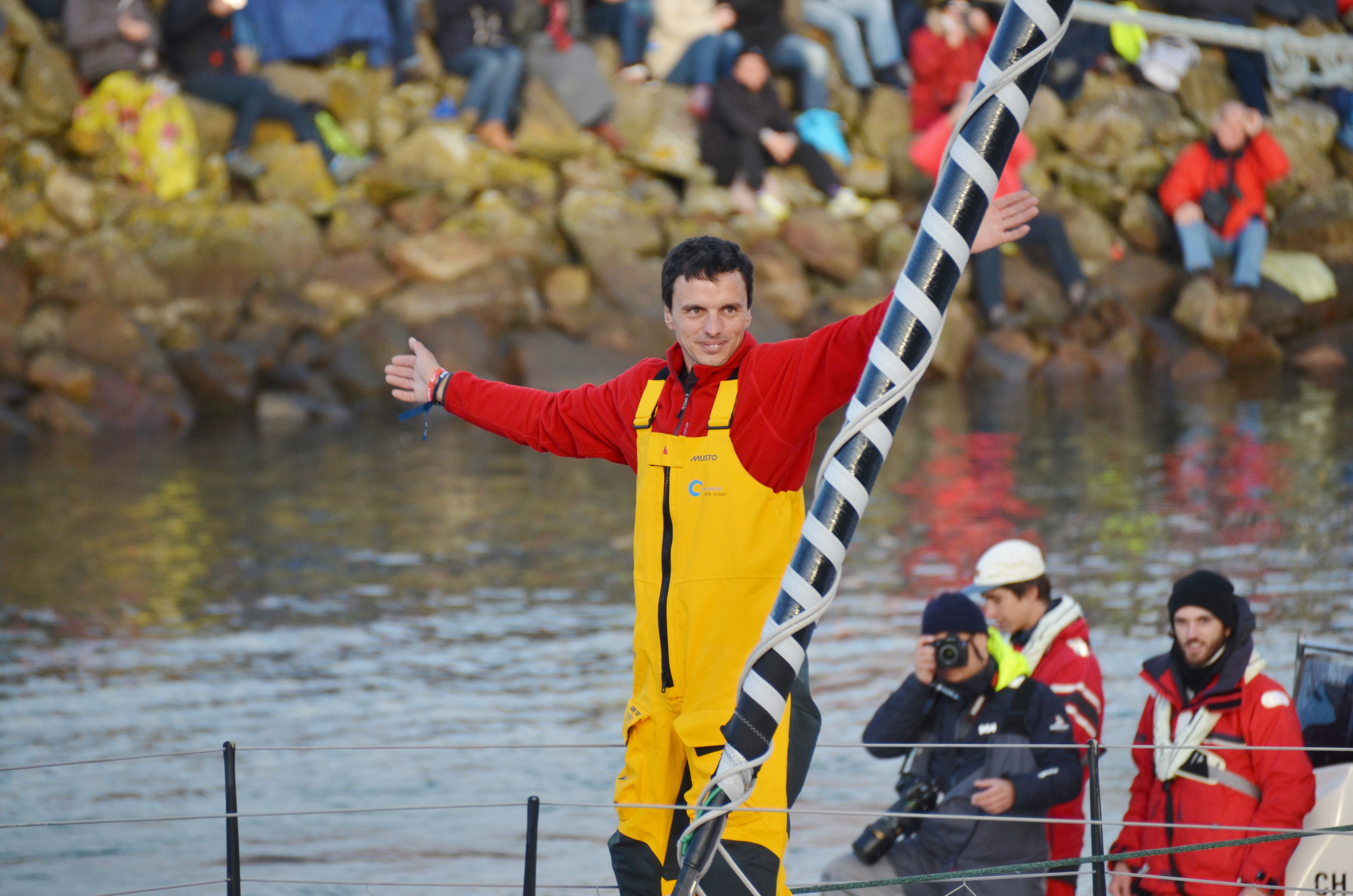
Departure of Didac Costa for the Vendée Globe 2016

== Racing career ==
He started his racing career in the Mini Class, taking part in 2011 in the Mini Transat 6.50, the solo transatlantic yacht race from La Rochelle to Salvador de Bahia where participants sail a 6.50 meter length yacht. He finished in 19th place. In 2014 he participated in the Barcelona World Race, the IMOCA 60 class double-handed non-stop round-the-world regatta. He sailed with Aleix Gelabert on the One Planet One Ocean yacht, formerly Kingfisher which was built for English yachtswoman Ellen MacArthur to race in the Vendée Globe in 2000. Costa and Gelabert finished in fourth place, sailing 27,791 nautical miles in 98 days, 9 hours, 12 minutes and 9 seconds.

In 2016, he took part in the eighth edition of the Vendée Globe, the only non-stop solo round the world race without assistance on IMOCA 60 class starting and finishing in Les Sables-d'Olonne. He raced aboard One Planet One Ocean again, under the insignia of the Royal Barcelona Maritime Club and Spanish ensign. 18 out of the 29 participants completed the race. Costa made it in 108 days, 19 hours, 50 minutes and 45 seconds, sailing 24,500 nautical miles and finishing in 14th place. He became the second Spanish yachtsman to complete the race, 24 years after José Luis Ugarte.

== Track record ==
- 2020: 20th, 2020–2021 Vendée Globe
- 2017: 14th, 2016–2017 Vendée Globe
- 2016: Winner, Mare Nostrum
- 2015: 4th, Barcelona World Race (co-skipper Aleix Gelabert)
- 2013: Winner, San Remo Mini Solo
- 2013: 3rd, Grand Premio d’Italia
- 2011: 19th, Mini Transat

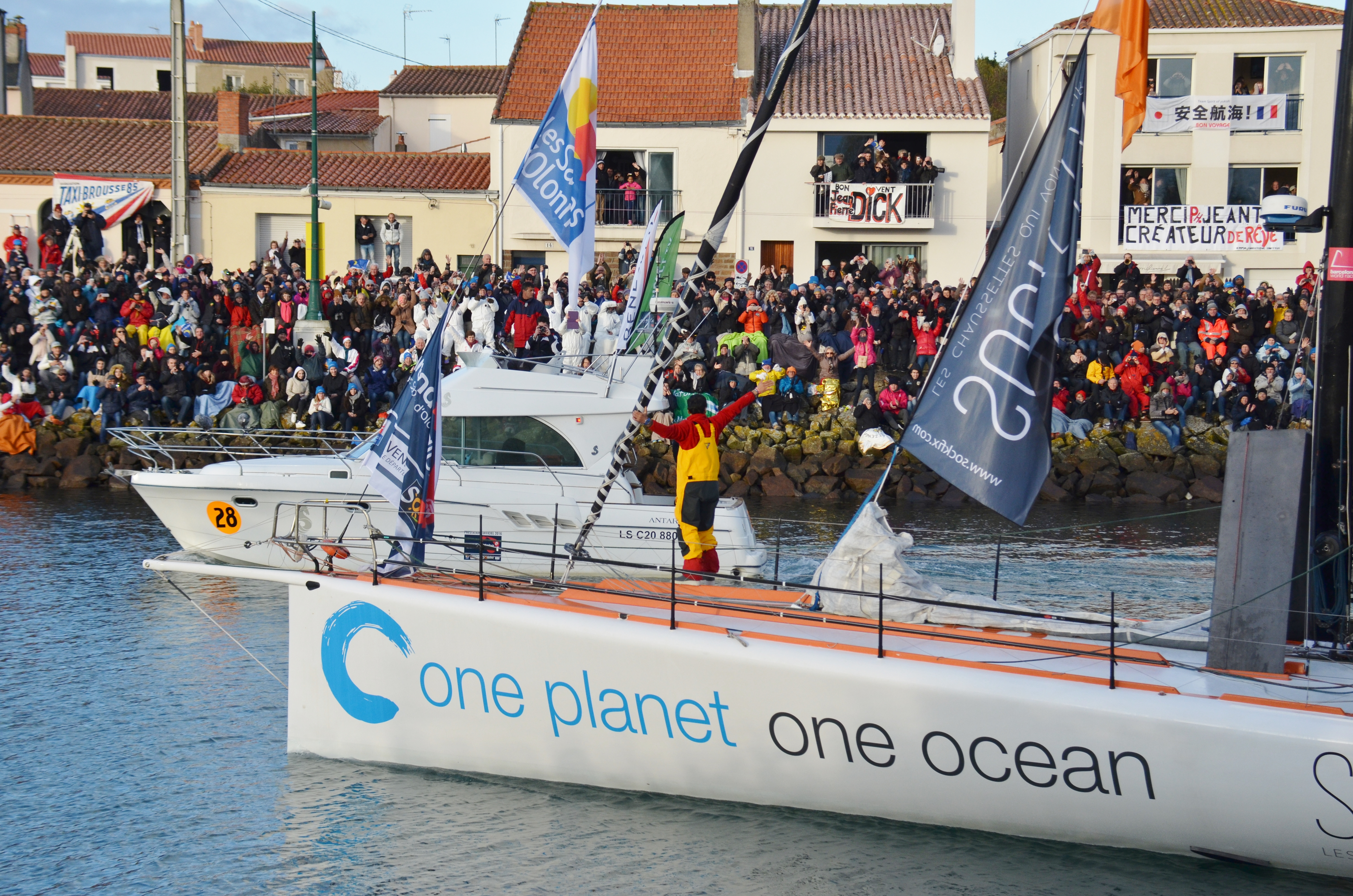
The One Planet One Ocean
