= Brian Thompson (sailor) =

British yachtsman (born 1962)

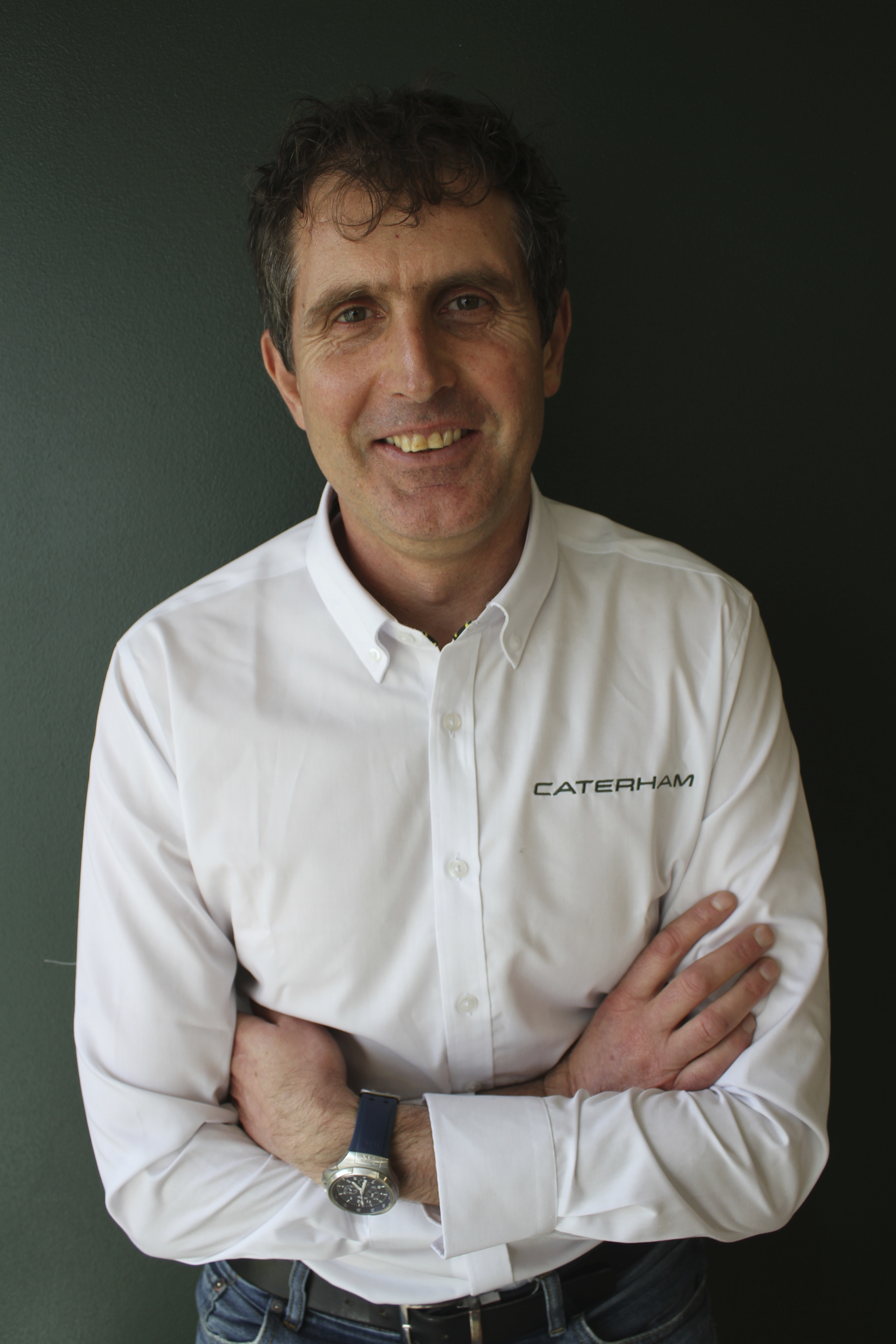
- Brian Thompson
- Born: 5 March 1962 (age 64); Scunthorpe, England
- Occupation: Professional off-shore sailor
- Children: 2

Brian Thompson (born 5 March 1962) is a British yachtsman. He was the first Briton to break the speed record twice for sailing around the world, and the first to sail non-stop around the world four times. He is a highly successful offshore racer on all types of high-performance yachts, from 21-foot Mini Transat racers to 140-foot Maxi Trimarans.

== Biography ==
He started his career in the OSTAR in 1992 with his own yacht. He sailed a lot on multihulls with Steve Fosset with whom he set several records, mainly the around the world sailing record in 2004.

In 2005, he won the Oryx Quest, round the world crewed race, in Doha 2006, ex-Club Med. In 2006, he won the Volvo Ocean Race on ABN AMRO One as a crewmember of Mike Sanderson. The same year, he finished 6th in the Route du Rhum, in IMOCA class. He finished 5th of the Vendée Globe 2008–2009 on a 60 feet IMOCA class Bahrain Team Pindar.

In 2012, he won the Jules Verne Trophy as helmsman and trimmer for Loïck Peyron, on the maxi-multihull Banque Populaire V. He then became the first British sailor with four non-stop laps of the world.

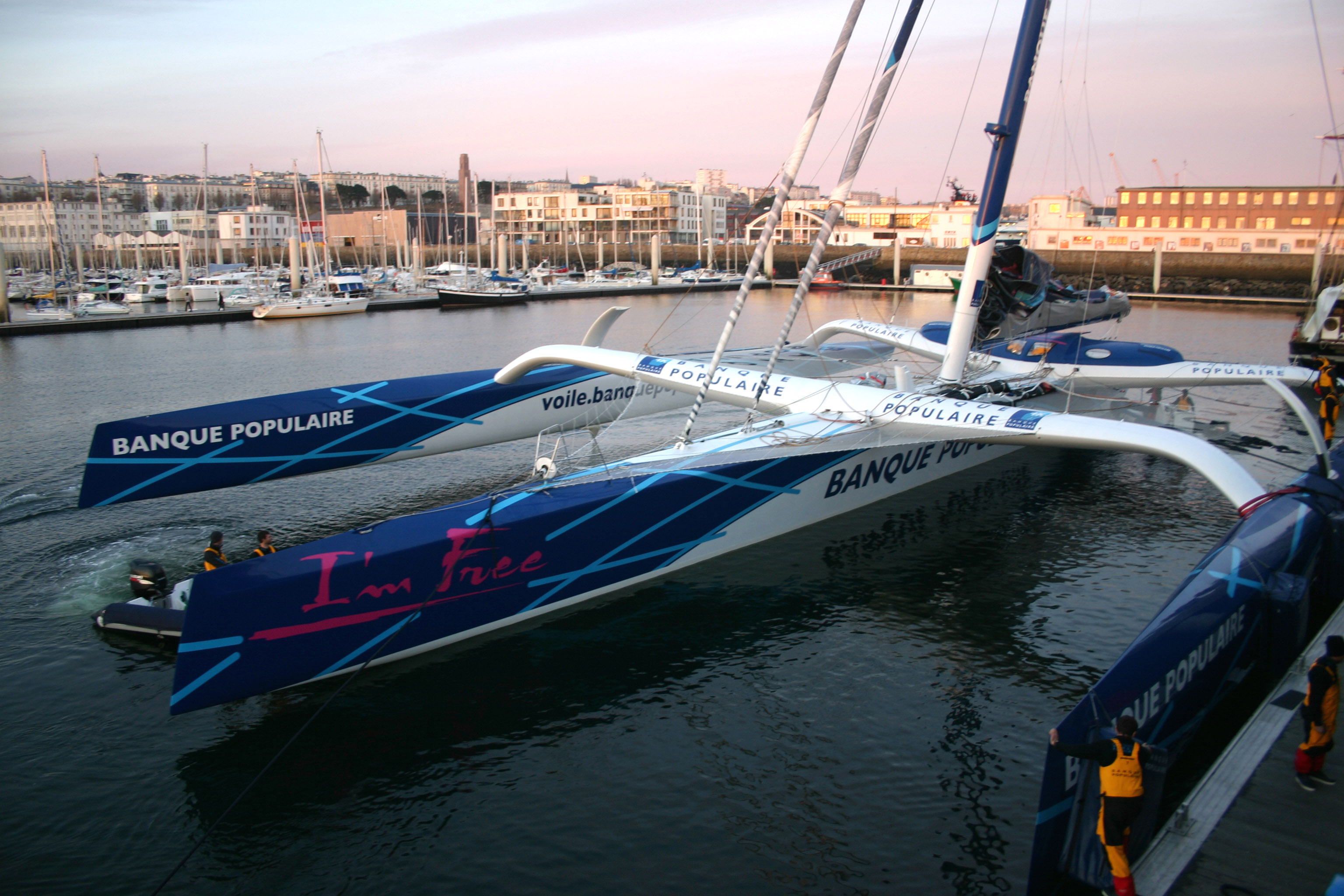
Banque Populaire V

== Caterham Challenge ==
Following the announcement in April that Brian had joined MGI in the role as sailing director, MGI announced on 15 May 2013 that Caterham Technology and Caterham Composites, part of the Caterham Group, have joined with MGI CEO Mike Gascoyne and MGI Sailing Director Brian Thompson to run a Class40 offshore racing campaign under the banner of "Caterham Challenge".

This two-year campaign follows on from Mike's successful 2012 solo transatlantic aboard a "Caterham Challenge" branded Class40. The Campaign objectives are to bring F1 standards of technology and logistics to off-shore racing, to encourage green, sustainable and reusable energy technologies in the marine, automotive and aerospace sectors and to utilize Caterham's extensive experience in F1, R&D, engineering, competitive sailing and sports marketing.

MGI built an Akilara RC3 Class40 and launched the racing boat in late August. Caterham Challenge was first on public display during the Southampton boat show 2013 followed by sailing and training in The Solent and the English Channel.

The racing calendar for "Caterham Challenge" includes the Transat Jacques Vabre 2013, the Grenada sailing week and the Caribbean 600 in early 2014, together with the Global Ocean Race, leaving from the Southampton Boatshow in September 2014 around the world.

Caterham Challenge started at the Transat Jacques Vabre on 7 November 2013 with Mike Gascoyne as skipper and Brian Thompson as co-skipper, leaving Le Havre, France for Itajai, Brazil.
