= Pete Goss =

British yacht racer

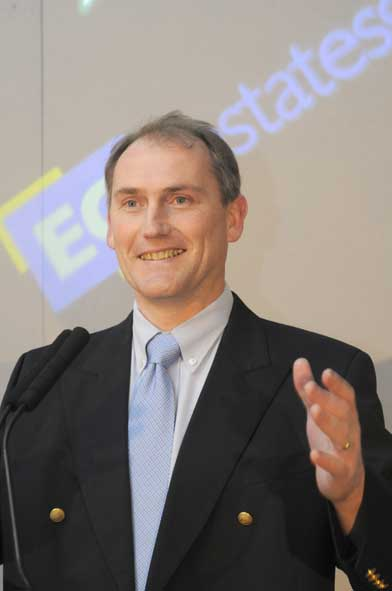
- Goss in 2010
- Born: 22 December 1961 (age 64); Yealmpton, Devon, England
- Awards: Legion of Honour – (1996)
- Website: PeteGoss.com

Pete Goss, MBE (born 22 December 1961) is a British yachtsman.

A former Royal Marine, he later became a competitive sailor, and developed the yacht Team Philips to try to break the world circumnavigation record. He was invested in the Legion d'Honneur for saving fellow sailor Raphaël Dinelli in the 1996 Vendée Globe solo around the world yacht race. During a severe storm in the Southern Ocean, he turned his boat around and spent two days sailing into hurricane-force winds, finally finding Dinelli in a life-raft that had been dropped by an Australian Air Force plane shortly before the yacht had sunk. Dinelli is said to have come aboard clutching a bottle of champagne.

He trained the original set of amateur crews for the British Steel Challenge, and competed in the race on board Hoffbräu Lager, coming 3rd overall.

Goss lives in Torpoint, Cornwall,, the couple have three children.

In June 2008, Goss launched a replica of a 19th-century wooden lugger called Spirit of Mystery. Four months later, he began a voyage from Cornwall to Australia on the boat, which has no modern electrical or navigation systems.

== Creative works ==
- Close to the Wind (1999)
