= Tracy Edwards =

British sailor (born 1962)

Tracy Edwards MBE
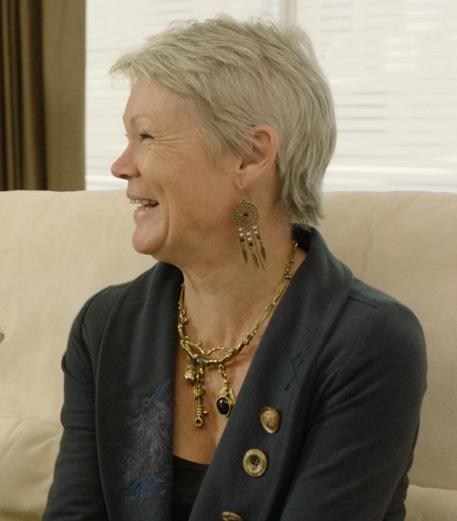
- Edwards in 2017
- Born: 5 September 1962 (age 63); Pangbourne, England
- Education: University of Roehampton
- Children: 1

Tracy Edwards, MBE (born 5 September 1962) is a British sailor. In 1989 she skippered the first all-female crew in the Whitbread Round the World Yacht Race in Maiden, becoming the first woman to receive the Yachtsman of the Year Trophy and was appointed MBE. She has written two books about her experiences.

== Early life ==
Edwards spent her early years in Pangbourne, England, with dreams of becoming a ballet dancer like her mother, but began to get into trouble after the death of her father when she was 10 and her subsequent relocation with her mother and stepfather to Wales. She was educated at The Highlands School, Reading and Gowerton Comprehensive School. She left home and backpacked across Europe at the age of 16 after her expulsion from school, then signed on as a stewardess of a yacht in Piraeus, which was her introduction to sailing.

== Sailing ==
During a stopover in the United States she met King Hussein I of Jordan, who encouraged her to pursue her idea of entering the Whitbread round-the-world yacht race with an all-female crew, and who would later arrange a sponsorship from Royal Jordanian Airlines, funding that allowed her yacht Maiden to compete in the race. Prior to this, Edwards served in several positions on other yachts, including deckhand and first mate, before entering her first Whitbread in the 1985–1986 competition. She began as the cook aboard the Norsk Data GB and in the second leg transferred to the Atlantic Privateer, also as cook.

Based on the small ratio of women in the race – five out of 200 – she determined to enter in 1989 with an entirely female crew. She recruited a 12-woman crew and mortgaged her home to buy a second-hand, 10-year-old, 58-foot yacht and refurbish it, renaming it Maiden. It finished second in its class, winning two out of six individual legs of the race. As a result, she garnered worldwide attention and praise and was awarded the Yachtsman of the Year Trophy and an MBE honour. In 1990, Edwards detailed her story in the book, Maiden, co-authored with Tim Madge.

Thereafter, Edwards started a family and began managing sailing programmes. In 2000 she undertook a new round-the-world sailing venture, Maiden 2, an attempt to claim the Jules Verne Trophy with a 110-foot maxi catamaran. This attempt ended with the boat being dismasted off of the coast of Chile. Edwards was then involved in the organisation of a new round-the world race, Oryx Quest, in 2005 in Qatar. This was the first time a round-the-world race had started and finished in the Middle East, based in Doha. After the successful event, which saw four of the fastest multihulls compete, Edwards was forced into bankruptcy when the Qatari sponsor dissolved their company and refused payment. She had personally borrowed £8m from the bank to help fund the event.

=== Recovery and restoration of Maiden ===
In 2014, Edwards discovered that Maiden was abandoned in poor condition in a marina in the Indian Ocean. She launched a successful public bid for funding to save the boat, with the intent to re-enact its Whitbread run before putting it in charitable use and displaying it in British maritime museums. Maiden returned to Southampton aboard a cargo ship in April 2017. Edwards and four of her Whitbread campaign crewmates were present to be reunited with their old boat. With external funding the boat was restored in Hamble, Southampton. With inspiration from King Hussein (and subsequently supported by his daughter, Princess Haya), Edwards founded "The Maiden Factor" which utilised Maiden to raise funds and awareness for girls' education. It was planned to re-launch Maiden in the summer of 2018 and in September 2018 depart from Southampton Boat Show with a new crew of women, on a three-year world tour.

Edwards and the crew of Maiden are the subject of the 2018 documentary film Maiden.

== Personal life ==
Edwards is single and has a daughter.

== Bibliography ==
- Maiden, with Tim Madge, Simon & Schuster, 1990 ISBN 978-0671710279
- Living Every Second Hodder & Stoughton, 2001 ISBN 978-0340770436
