= Tony Bullimore =

British businessman and yachtsman (1939–2018)

- Born: 15 January 1939; Southend-on-Sea, Essex, England
- Died: 31 July 2018 (aged 79)
- Education: Claremont High School, Kenton
- Occupations: Businessman, international yachtsman
- Spouse: Lalel Bullimore (m. 1960s)

Tony Bullimore (15 January 1939 – 31 July 2018) was a British businessman and international yachtsman. During the 1996–97 Vendée Globe solo round-the-world yacht race, his vessel lost its keel and capsized in the Southern Ocean. He survived for four days inside the upturned hull before being located and rescued by the Australian Navy.

== Early life and career ==
Born in Southend-on-Sea, Essex, he was educated at Claremont School.

Bullimore moved to Bristol in the early 1960s and married Lalel, a West Indian immigrant. In 1966 they opened the Afro-Caribbean-inspired Bamboo Club, which was billed as "Bristol's Premier West Indian Entertainment Centre", housed a restaurant, theatre workshop, football team and was the headquarters of the Bristol West Indian Cricket Club. The top floor housed the music venue, with DJs playing reggae and American soul music, and bands performed including Bob Marley and The Wailers, Jimmy Cliff, Ben E. King and Tina Turner. The club burned down in 1977, just before the Sex Pistols were due to play there. Bullimore had already opened The Granary club at Bristol's Granary building in the early 1970s, which after ten years he slowly sold off to concentrate on other business ventures. He also became a race relations advocate in Bristol.

== Sailing ==
Bullimore was rescued after capsizing during the 1996–97 Vendée Globe single-handed around-the-world race. The race was marked by a number of incidents, including the death of another competitor, Gerry Roufs.

On 5 January 1997, in the Southern Ocean near 52°S 100°E, around 2,500 kilometres (1,300 nmi) off the Australian coast and in winds of up to 160 kilometres per hour (100 mph; 90 kn), Bullimore's boat, Exide Challenger, capsized after the keel had snapped off. Bullimore managed to reach an air pocket in the upside-down boat in pitch darkness, having lost his food supplies, aside from a bar of chocolate. The Royal Australian Navy launched a rescue mission for Bullimore and another Vendée Globe capsized competitor, Thierry Dubois. On 9 January, Dubois was rescued by an Australian S-70B-2 Seahawk helicopter embarked on the frigate HMAS Adelaide.

Adelaide then proceeded further south to where the Exide Challenger had been located by a Royal Australian Air Force P-3 Orion. Adelaide dispatched a rigid-hulled inflatable boat to the Exide Challenger where Leading Seaman Clearance Diver Alan Rub knocked on the hull. Hearing the noise, Bullimore swam out from his boat and was quickly rescued. HMAS Adelaide then returned both Dubois and Bullimore to Perth.

In 2000 he was featured in a BBC documentary about crossing the Atlantic Ocean, with the comedian Lenny Henry.

Bullimore skippered a team that came second in the 2005 Oryx Quest. In 2007, he was involved in another sailing record attempt.

== Death ==
Bullimore died on 31 July 2018, aged 79, of a rare form of stomach cancer.

== Bibliography ==
- Saved, Time Warner Paperbacks, 1998, ISBN 0751523348
- Rescue in the Southern Ocean, Penguin Group Australia, 1997, ISBN 0140268375
- Yachting Yarns, Little, Brown Book Group Limited, 2000, ISBN 0316850446.
