= Nigel Irens =

British yacht designer

Nigel Irens RDI is a yacht designer. He is the designer of the Adventure which is a 35m trimaran motor yacht which completed a circumnavigation in 1998. He also designed the B&Q/Castorama which is a 23 m sailing trimaran used by Ellen MacArthur to break the world record for solo circumnavigation in 2005.

In addition to performance yachts, his design portfolio includes cruising designs such as Roxane, and other sailing designs of traditional appearance such as the Westernman cutters. He also designed the launch Rangeboat which is a 12m power craft of traditional appearance.

Irens' designs are recognized for their simplicity, efficiency, and, essential elegance. They synthesise traditional forms with modern materials and methods of construction, with Carbon fibre masts, laminated frames, and epoxied strip wood strongly in evidence.

The late Ed Burnett worked for Irens at the start of his career as a yacht designer. They collaborated on projects and worked together on designs such as Zinnia, a 30ft gaff cutter, Kilrush Nomad II, a 43ft gaff cutter, the Westernman cutters and the King Alfred dinghy to be built by King Alfred School in London. By 2012, the school had built three, and used them to introduce students to dinghy cruising.
