= Jules Verne Trophy =

Prize for fastest around-the-world yacht trip

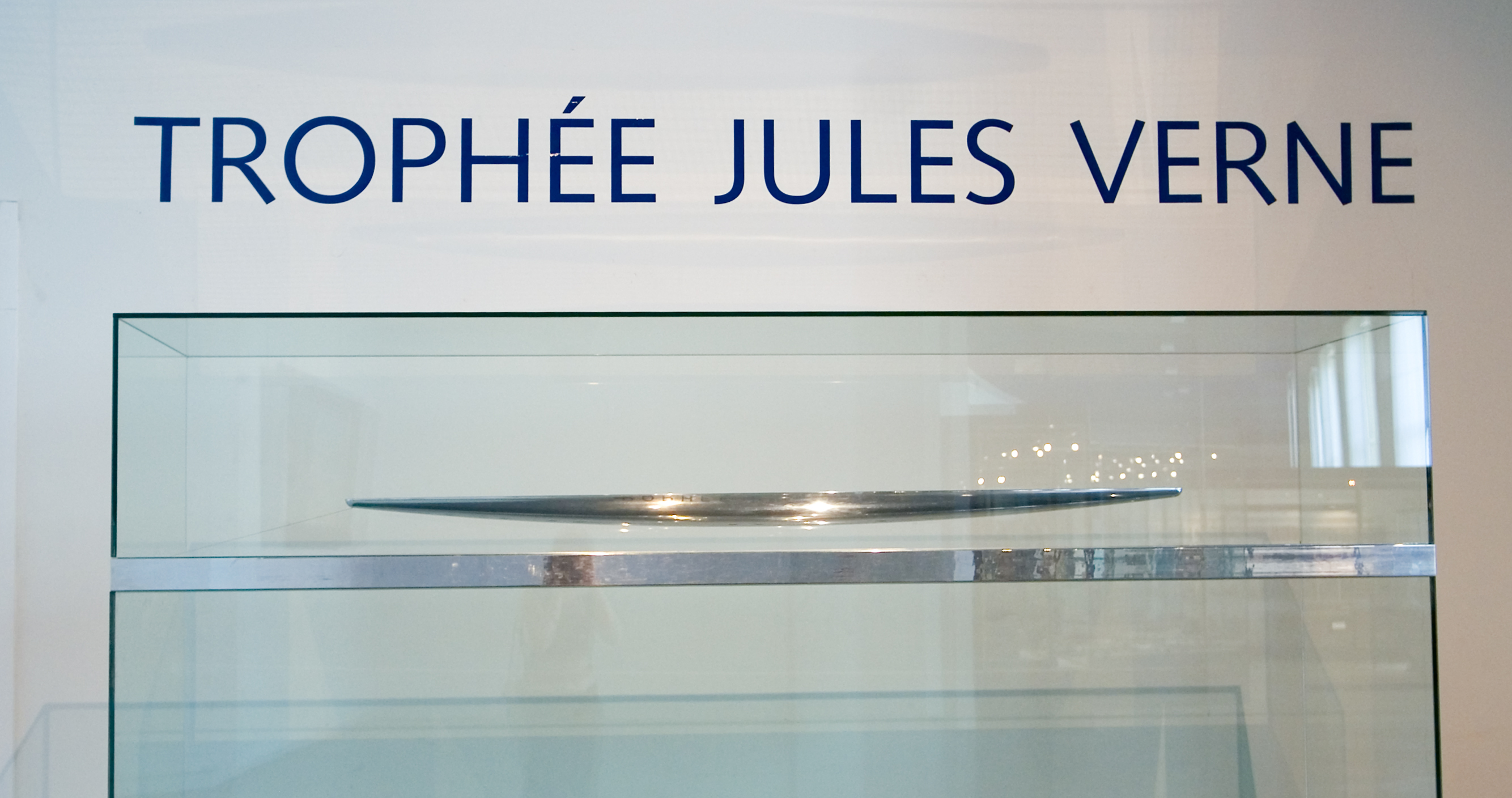
The Trophy, displayed at the National Maritime Museum, Paris

The Jules Verne Trophy is a prize for the fastest circumnavigation of the world by any type of yacht with no restrictions on the size of the crew provided the vessel has registered with the organization and paid an entry fee. A vessel holding the Jules Verne trophy will not necessarily hold the absolute round the world record. The trophy was first awarded to the first yacht which sailed around the world in less than 80 days. The name of the award is a reference to the Jules Verne novel Around the World in Eighty Days in which Phileas Fogg traverses the planet (albeit by railroad and steamboat) in 80 days. The current holder is Sodebo Ultim 3 skippered by Thomas Coville in 40 days 10 hours 45 minutes 50 seconds in 2026.

== Route ==
Starting line
- The Jules Verne Trophy's starting point is defined by a line between the Créac'h lighthouse on Ouessant (Ushant) Island, France, and the Lizard Lighthouse, UK. The boats have to circumnavigate the world leaving the capes of Good Hope, Leeuwin, and Horn to port and cross the starting line in the opposite direction.
- The starting line is open as of the official ratification of the trophy's rules by the World Sailing Speed Record Council.

== Rules ==
The Jules Verne Trophy is awarded to the challenger who breaks the previous Jules Verne record of the round the world voyage under sail. The winner holds the trophy until such time as his/her record has been bettered. The boats must solely be propelled by natural forces of the wind and of the crew, but the trophy is open to any type of boat with no restrictions. Crew size is not restricted either. The circumnavigation must be completed non-stop and with no physical outside assistance, although on-shore weather routing is allowed. The challengers must respect certain safety rules.

== History ==
The original idea for this competition has been attributed to Yves Le Cornec in 1985. The rules were defined in 1990. A committee was put in place to guarantee respect of the rules and fairplay. This committee included Peter Blake, Florence Arthaud, Jean-François Coste, Yvon Fauconnier, Gabrie Guilly, Robin Knox-Johnston, Titouan Lamazou, Yves Le Cornec, Bruno Peyron, Olivier de Kersauson, and Didier Ragot.

While the current holder of the trophy, Francis Joyon, also holds the around the world sailing record, this has not always been the case. In 2004 Steve Fossett broke the world record with the catamaran Cheyenne but was not awarded the trophy. According to reports, the trophy organizers requested a higher entrance fee from Fossett than from the other competitors, the difference which he refused to pay (€30,000 upfront versus €11,000 & only needed to pay if they won the trophy). The winner of the trophy that year was Olivier de Kersauson on Geronimo, with a time which was five days slower than Fossett's world record.

=== Summary of intermediate records ===
Passage	Date	Time	Skipper	Crew	Boat
Ushant-Equator	2019	4 d 19 h 57 min	Yann Guichard	14 people	Maxi Spindrift 2
Equator-Cape Agulhas	2021	5 d 20 h 39 min	Franck Cammas	6 people	fr:Maxi Edmond de Rothschild
Indian Ocean WSSRC	2016	5 d 21 h 09 min	Francis Joyon	6 people	IDEC sport
Pacific Ocean WSSRC	2017	7 d 15 h 15 min	François Gabart	singlehanded	Macif
Cape Horn-Equator	2017	6 d 22 h 15 min	François Gabart	singlehanded	Macif
Equator-Ushant	2017	5 d 19 h 21 min	Francis Joyon	6 people	IDEC sport

The best passage times are shared between 4 boats:

- Banque Populaire V , designed in 2006, launched in 2008 and renamed "Maxi Spindrift 2" in 2013
- Groupama 3 , designed in 2004, launched in 2006 and renamed IDEC sport in 2015
- Macif , designed in 2013, launched in 2015 and since then mainly singlehanded by François Gabart
- fr:Maxi Edmond de Rothschild designed in 2014, launched in 2017

Adding the record times of the various intermediate routes, gives a total record round the world in 36 days 22 hours and 36 minutes, or 4 days better than the record established in 2017 by Francis Joyon on IDEC sport .

=== 2016 record ===
Francis Joyon took possession of the former Groupama 3 on October 2, 2015, after three weeks of work at Multiplast, in Vannes. He chose an intermediate configuration between the initial power and a reduced rigging for solo races. Closer to the lightness and ergonomics sought alone, less versatile in particular in light winds, Joyon's choices paid off during his two passages in the southern seas at the end of 2015 and again at the end of 2016, earning him numerous records. With a crew reduced to six people, IDEC Sport was ready to attempt the Jules-Verne Trophy, held since 2011 by Loïck Peyron with a time of 45 days, 13 hours, 42 minutes and 53 seconds.

After an attempt in November 2016 met with unfavorable weather in the doldrums and the South Atlantic, and a shock that slightly damaged the boat's fin, Joyon set out again on December 16, 2016 to conquer the trophy. He arrived on January 26, 2017 with a new around the world sailing record of 40 days 23 h 30 min 30 s. During their 2016 attempt for the Jules-Verne Trophy, Francis Joyon and his crew broke numerous intermediate records: four have been formalized and are the subject of records duly certified by the WSSRC.

They made quick crossings of the southern seas starting with the Indian Ocean, covering 8091,73 miles in 10 days (an average of 809 miles per day). This episode began ahead of the front of a depression which moved at a speed corresponding to the boat's potential from South America to the Pacific Ocean. During 12 days, the wind remained port tack, blowing constantly at over 30 knots, an ideal configuration for speed records. Top speeds varied between 38 and 44 knots. Due to bad seas, their speed dropped temporarily (29 knots or 700 mi (1,100 km) per day) but soon climbed back above 800 mi (1,300 km) daily.

After passing New Zealand and the Antimeridian, sailing port tack 205 degrees longitude (25 degrees West to Antimeridian) in the southern seas, the crew jibed in the transition between two depressions, and managed to catch up with the weather system in front of them over the Pacific Ocean, setting off again at more than 30 knots daily average towards Cape Horn.

Joyon rounded Cape Horn, 16 days after hitting the first left South America, after a course of nearly 12,000 mi (19,000 km) above 30 knots average (730, 16 miles per day over 16 days). He then signs a performance increase of 30 to 40% compared to Loïck Peyron's record 5 years earlier. Leaving the southern seas with a lead of 4 days 6 hours 35 min over Peyron's previous record, Joyon and his crew regained 2,800 mi (4,500 km) on the record during this stretch.

The weather conditions allowed them to optimize their course, covering 26,412 mi (42,506 km) on the ground, at an average of 26.85 knots, for a theoretical course of 22,461 mi (36,147 km). Banque Populaire V, the previous recordholder, had to cover almost 2600 more miles (29,002 miles).

=== Distance records broken during the 2016 campaign ===
While the best day of Loïck Peyron's previous record was the only day above 800 miles (811 miles over 24 hours, or 33.79 knots average), Francis Joyon maintained a speed above 800 daily miles for 10 consecutive days.

It thus improved on a large number of progress records by a sailboat over a given period:

Skipper	Reference	Distance (miles)	speed (knots)	speed (miles/24 h)
Joyon	best 24h	894	37,3	894
	best 48 h	1 748,2	36,42	874,1
	best 72 h	2 617,7	36,36	872,57
	best 4 days	3 477,4	36,22	869,35
Joyon	best 5 days	4 312,57	35,94	862,51
	best 6 days	5 104,16	35,45	850,7
	best 8 days	6 525,14	33,99	815,64
	best 10 days	8 091,73	33,71	809,17
	best 12 days	9 369,03	32,53	780,75
Joyon	best 16 days	11 682,62	30,42	730,16

=== Other records broken during the 2016 campaign ===
- Boat record and the second longest distance covered by a sailboat in 24 hours with 894 miles.
- 6 consecutive days at an average of 850.7 miles / 24 h (35.45 knots)
- Ushant-Cape Leeuwin 17 d 06 h 59 min 45 (time of Loïck Peyron during the 2011 record: 17 d 23 h 57 min)
- Ushant-Tasmania 18 d 18 h 31 min (time of Loïck Peyron during the 2011 record: 20 d 07 h 11 min)
- Ushant-Antiméridien 20 d 07 h 01 (time of Loïck Peyron during the 2011 record: 22 d 11 h 34 min)
- Ushant-Cape Horn: 26 d 15 h 45 min (time of Loïck Peyron during the 2011 record: 30 d 22 h 19 min)
- Equator – Cape Leeuwin: 11 d 12 h (time of Loïck Peyron during the 2011 record: 12 d 9 h 2 min)
- Cape Agulhas-cape Leeuwin in 4 days 9 h 37 min 46 at an average speed of 35.08 knots over ground (3,705 miles) or 842 miles in 24 hours (6 days 8 min or 36% more for Loïck Peyron's previous record)
- Cape Leeuwin – Cape Horn in 9 d 08 h 46 min (12 d 22 h 22 min or 38% more for Loïck Peyron's previous record)
- Cape of Good Hope – Cape Horn in 13 d 20 h 13 min (19 d 00 h 31 min or 37% more for Loïck Peyron's previous record)
- Cape of Good Hope – Cape Leeuwin: 4 d 11 h 31 min (6 d 02 h 09 min or 36% more for Loïck Peyron's previous record in 2011)
- Cap Leeuwin – Cape Horn in 9 d 08 h 46 min (12 d 22 h 22 min or 38% more for Loïck Peyron's previous record)
- Indian Ocean: 5 d 21 h 7 min 45 s (WSSRC reference) (8 d 07 h 23 min or 41% more for Loïck Peyron during the 2011 record)
- Pacific Ocean: 7 d 21 h 13 min 31 s (WSSRC reference) (10 d 15 h 07 min or 39% more for Loïck Peyron during the 2011 record)
- Equator-Equator record: 29 d 9 h 10 min 55 s (WSSRC reference) (32 d 11 h 52 min or 11% more for Loïck Peyron during the 2011 record)
- North Atlantic return record: 5 d 19 h 21 min (7 d 10 h 58 min or 25% more for Loïck Peyron during the 2011 record)

=== Jules Verne Trophy records ===
Year	Skipper	Yacht	Type	Time
2026	(France) Thomas Coville	Sodebo Ultim 3	Trimaran	40 days 10 hours 45 minutes 30 seconds
2017	(France) Francis Joyon	IDEC Sport	Trimaran	40 days 23 hours 30 minutes 50 seconds
2012	(France) Loïck Peyron	Banque Populaire V	Trimaran	45 days 13 hours 42 minutes 53 seconds
2010	(France) Franck Cammas	Groupama 3	Trimaran	48 days 7 hours 44 minutes 52 seconds
2005	(France) Bruno Peyron	Orange II	Catamaran	50 days 16 hours 20 minutes 4 seconds
2004	(France) Olivier de Kersauson	Geronimo	Trimaran	63 days 13 hours 59 minutes 46 seconds
2002	(France) Bruno Peyron	Orange	Catamaran	64 days 8 hours 37 minutes 24 seconds
1997	(France) Olivier de Kersauson	Sport Elec	Trimaran	71 days 14 hours 22 minutes 8 seconds
1994	(United Kingdom) Robin Knox-Johnston (New Zealand) Peter Blake	ENZA New Zealand	Catamaran	74 days 22 hours 17 minutes 22 seconds
1993	(France) Bruno Peyron	Explorer	Catamaran	79 days 6 hours 15 minutes 56 seconds

=== Notable performances ===
During her Jules-Verne trophy record in 2011–2012, the Banque Populaire V skippered by Loïck Peyron covered 811.70 nautical miles in 24 hours on 3 December 2011 at 11:45 UT, posting 28 days over 600 miles, including 9 days over 700 miles and 1 day over 800 miles.

During her Jules-Verne trophy record in 2009–2010, the trimaran Groupama 3 skippered by Franck Cammas covered 798 nautical miles in 24 hours on 13 February 2010 at 5 p.m. UT, showing 17 days over 600 miles, including 10 days over 700 miles.

During her Jules-Verne trophy record in 2016–2017, the trimaran Idec sport skippered by Francis Joyon covered 894 nautical miles in 24 hours, and 10 consecutive days at 809 miles / 24 h. Francis Joyon rounds Cape Horn, 16 days after riding off of South America, and after a course of nearly 12,000 miles above an average of 30 knots (730.16 miles / 24 h over 16 days). He then signs a performance increase of between 30 and 40% compared to the record to be broken by Loïck Peyron 5 years earlier. Leaving the southern seas with a lead of 4 j 06 h 35 min over Loïck Peyron's previous record, Francis Joyon and his crew regained the equivalent of 2,800 miles on the record during this episode.

During the aborted attempt of 2019, Yann Guichard sets a new record crossing the equator in 4 days 19 h 57 min and, thanks to favorable weather conditions, lines up 4,812.1 miles from the 11th to 16th day, or 802 miles / day for 6 consecutive days.

During his record around the world Singlehanded in 2017, 24 hour distance record for François Gabart on Macif: 850,68 miles in 24h.

During his attempt for the Jules Verne Trophy on December 5, 2020, Thomas Coville on fr:Sodebo Ultim 3 covered 889.9 miles in 24 hours (37.1 knots average, top speed 48.9 knots).

During his attempt for the Jules Verne Trophy on December 21, 2024, François Gabart on SVR-Lazartigue covered 892.2 miles in 24 hours (37.2 knots average, top speed over 50 knots).

=== Passage records ===
Skipper	Date	Equator	Good Hope	Cape Agulhas	Cape Leeuwin	Tasmania	Anti méridian	Cape Horn	Equator return	Ushant
Thomas Coville	2025	4 d 04 h 02 min	10 d 23 h 55 min	11 d 03 h 10 min	17 d 1 h 17 min	18 d 16 h 34 min	20 d 10 h 54 min	26 d 4 h 46 min		
Thomas Coville	2024	5 d 03 h 21 min	11 d 15 h 11 min	11 d 18 h 34 min	resign on day 16 (rudder failure)					
Franck Cammas	2021	5 d 13 h 14 min	11 d 09 h 53 min	11 d 14 h 03 min	resign on day 13 (rudder failure)					
Thomas Coville	2020	5 d 09 h 50 min	12 d 02 h 05 min	12 d 03 h 45 min	resign on day 16 (rudder failure)					
Yann Guichard	2019	4 d 19 h 57 min	12 d 13 h 02 min	12 d 14 h 52 min	resign on day 16 (rudder failure)					
Francis Joyon	2016	5 d 18 h 59 min	12 d 19 h 28 min	12 d 21 h 22 min	17 d 06 h 59 min	18 d 18 h 31 min	20 d 07 h 04 min	26 d 15 h 45 min	35 d 04 h 09 min	40 d 23 h 30 min
Loïck Peyron	2011	5 d 14 h 55 min	11 d 21 h 48 min	11 d 23 h 49 min	17 d 23 h 57 min	20 d 07 h 11 min	22 d 11 h 34 min	30 d 22 h 19 min	38 d 02 h 46 min	45 d 13 h 42 min
Yann Guichard	2015	4 d 21 h 29 min	11 d 22 h 04 min	12 d 00 h 02 min	18 d 11 h 25 min	20 d 04 h 37 min	22 d 07 h 43 min	30 d 04 h 07 min	39 d 13 h 31 min	47 d 10 h 59 min
Francis Joyon	2015	5 d 05 h 01 min	13 d 05 h 11 min	13 d 09 h 15 min	18 d 20 h 37 min	20 d 08 h 18 min	22 d 09 h 48 min	31 d 01 h 47 min	40 d 14 h 53 min	47 d 14 h 47 min
Franck Cammas	2009	5 d 15 h 23 min	14 d 13 h 31 min	14 d 15 h 48 min	21 d 14 h 22 min	22 d 20 h 27 min	25 d 07 h 36 min	32 d 04 h 34 min	41 d 21 h 09 min	48 d 07 h 44 min
Bruno Peyron	2005	7 d 02 h 56 min	14 d 05 h 21 min	14 d 08 h 19 min	21 d 13 h	23 d 19 h 23 min	25 d 21 h 33 min	32 d 13 h 29 min	40 d 19 h 05 min	50 d 16 h 20 min
O. de Kersauson	2003	6 d 11 h 26 min	16 d 14 h 35 min		26 d 04 h 53 min		31 d 22 h 53 min	41 d 16 h 27 min	53 d 09 h 37 min	68 d 01 h 58 min
Bruno Peyron	2002	7 d 22 h	18 d 18 h 40 min		29 d 07 h 22 min		34 d 09 h 20 min	42 d 02 h 52 min	53 d 04 h 49 min	64 d 08 h 37 min

=== Intermediate records ===
Skipper	Date	Equator Good Hope	Good Hope Cape Leeuwin	Cape Leeuwin Cape Horn	Cape Horn Equator	Equator Ushant
Franck Cammas	2009	5 d 20 h 39 min				
Thomas Coville	2020	6 d 16 h 15 min				
Yann Guichard	2019	7 d 17 h 11 min				
Francis Joyon	2016	7 d 00 h 29 min	4 d 11 h 31 min	9 d 08 h 46 min	8 d 12 h 24 min	5 d 19 h 21 min
Loïck Peyron	2011	6 d 06 h 53 min	6 d 02 h 09 min	12 d 22 h 22 min	7 d 04 h 27 min	7 d 10 h 58 min
Yann Guichard	2015	7 d 00 h 35 min	6 d 13 h 21 min	12 d 06 h 03 min	9 d 09 h 24 min	7 d 21 h 28 min
Francis Joyon	2015	8 d 04 h 10 min	5 d 15 h 26 min	12 d 05 h 10 min	9 d 13 h 06 min	6 d 23 h 56 min
Franck Cammas	2009	7 d 02 h 23 min	7 d 00 h 51 min	10 d 14 h 12 min	9 d 16 h 35 min	6 d 10 h 44 min
Bruno Peyron	2005	7 d 05 h 23 min	7 d 07 h 39 min	12 d 00 h 29 min	8 d 05 h 36 min	9 d 21 h 15 min
Bruno Peyron	2002				11 d 01 h 57 min	11 d 03 h 48 min

Skipper	Date	Good Hope Cape Horn	Equator Equator	Equator Cape Horn	Cape Horn Ushant	Indian Ocean WSSRC	Pacific Ocean WSSRC
Francis Joyon	2016	13 d 20 h 13 min	29 d 09 h 10 min	20 d 20 h 46 min	14 d 07 h 45 min	5 d 21 h 09 min	7 d 21 h 14 min
Loïck Peyron	2011	19 d 00 h 31 min	32 d 11 h 51 min	25 d 07 h 23 min	14 d 15 h 25 min	8 d 07 h 23 min	10 d 15 h 07 min
Yann Guichard	2015	18 d 06 h 03 min	34 d 08 h 02 min	25 d 06 h 38 min	17 d 06 h 54 min	8 d 04 h 45	9 d 23 h 30 min
Francis Joyon	2015	17 d 20 h 36 min	35 d 13 h 52 min	26 d 00 h 46 min	16 d 13 h 02 min	7 d 00 h 00	10 d 23 h 10 min
Franck Cammas	2009	17 d 15 h 03 min	36 d 02 h 03 min	26 d 09 h 27 min	16 d 03 h 19 min	8 d 17 h 39 min	8 d 18 h 41 min
Bruno Peyron	2005	18 d 08 h 08 min	33 d 16 h 06 min	25 d 10 h 33 min	18 d 02 h 39 min	9 d 11 h 04 min	8 d 18 h 08 min
O. de Kersauson	2003	25 d 01 h 52 min					
Bruno Peyron	2002	23 d 08 h 12 min			22 d 05 h 45 min		

=== Failed record attempts ===
Year	Skipper	Yacht	Type	Notes
2021	(France) Franck Cammas	Gitana 17	Trimaran	rudder failure, 13 days after departure, south east of Cape Agulhas.
2020	(France) Thomas Coville	fr:Sodebo Ultim 3	Trimaran	rudder failure, 16 days after departure, south east of Kerguelen islands.
2020	(France) Franck Cammas	Gitana 17	Trimaran	Broken foil, Cape Verde 3 days after departure.
2019	(France) Yann Guichard	Spindrift 2 formerly Banque Populaire V	Trimaran	Rudder problem, about 50 miles West of Porto, Portugal on December 4, 2019 after 23 hours from departure.
2016	(France) Francis Joyon	IDEC 3 formerly Banque Populaire VII and Groupama 3	Trimaran	Turned around after one week due to weather window did not evolve as forecasted
2015	(France) Francis Joyon	IDEC 3 formerly Banque Populaire VII and Groupama 3	Trimaran	47 days 14 hours 47 minutes, record not broken, crossed the finish line on January 8, 2016
2015	(France) Yann Guichard (Switzerland) Dona Bertarelli	Spindrift 2 formerly Banque Populaire V	Trimaran	47 days 10 hours 59 minutes, record not broken, crossed the finish line on January 8, 2016
2011	(France) Pascal Bidégorry	Banque Populaire V	Trimaran	Damaged centerboard, west of the Cape of Good Hope
2009	(France) Franck Cammas	Groupama 3	Trimaran	Broken aft beam bulkhead, South Africa
2008	(France) Franck Cammas	Groupama 3	Trimaran	Loss of leeward float leading to capsize, New Zealand
2004	(France) Bruno Peyron	Orange II	Catamaran	Damaged starboard hull, Cap Verde islands
2004	(France) Bruno Peyron	Orange II	Catamaran	Damaged starboard crashbox, Spain
2004	(France) Olivier de Kersauson	Geronimo	Trimaran	Damaged gennaker, North Atlantic
2003	(France) Olivier de Kersauson	Geronimo	Trimaran	Circumnavigation achieved, record not broken
2003	(United Kingdom) Ellen MacArthur	Kingfisher 2 (formerly Orange)	Catamaran	Broken mast, South-East Kerguelen Islands
2002	(France) Olivier de Kersauson	Geronimo	Trimaran	Damaged rudder, Brazil
2002	(France) Bruno Peyron	Orange (formerly Innovation Explorer)	Catamaran	Damaged mast, Ouessant
1998	(United Kingdom) Tracy Edwards	Royal et SunAlliance (formerly ENZA New Zealand)	Catamaran	Broken mast, Southern seas
1996	(France) Olivier de Kersauson	Sport-Elec	Trimaran	Excessive delay
1995	(France) Olivier de Kersauson	Sport-Elec (formerly Lyonnaise des Eaux)	Trimaran	Extreme weather
1994	(France) Olivier de Kersauson	Lyonnaise des Eaux (formerly Charal)	Trimaran	Circumnavigation achieved, record not broken
1993	(New Zealand) Peter Blake (United Kingdom) Robin Knox-Johnston	ENZA New Zealand	Catamaran	Damaged hull, Indian Ocean
1993	(France) Olivier de Kersauson	Charal	Trimaran	Damaged outrigger hull, South of Cape Town

== The trophy ==
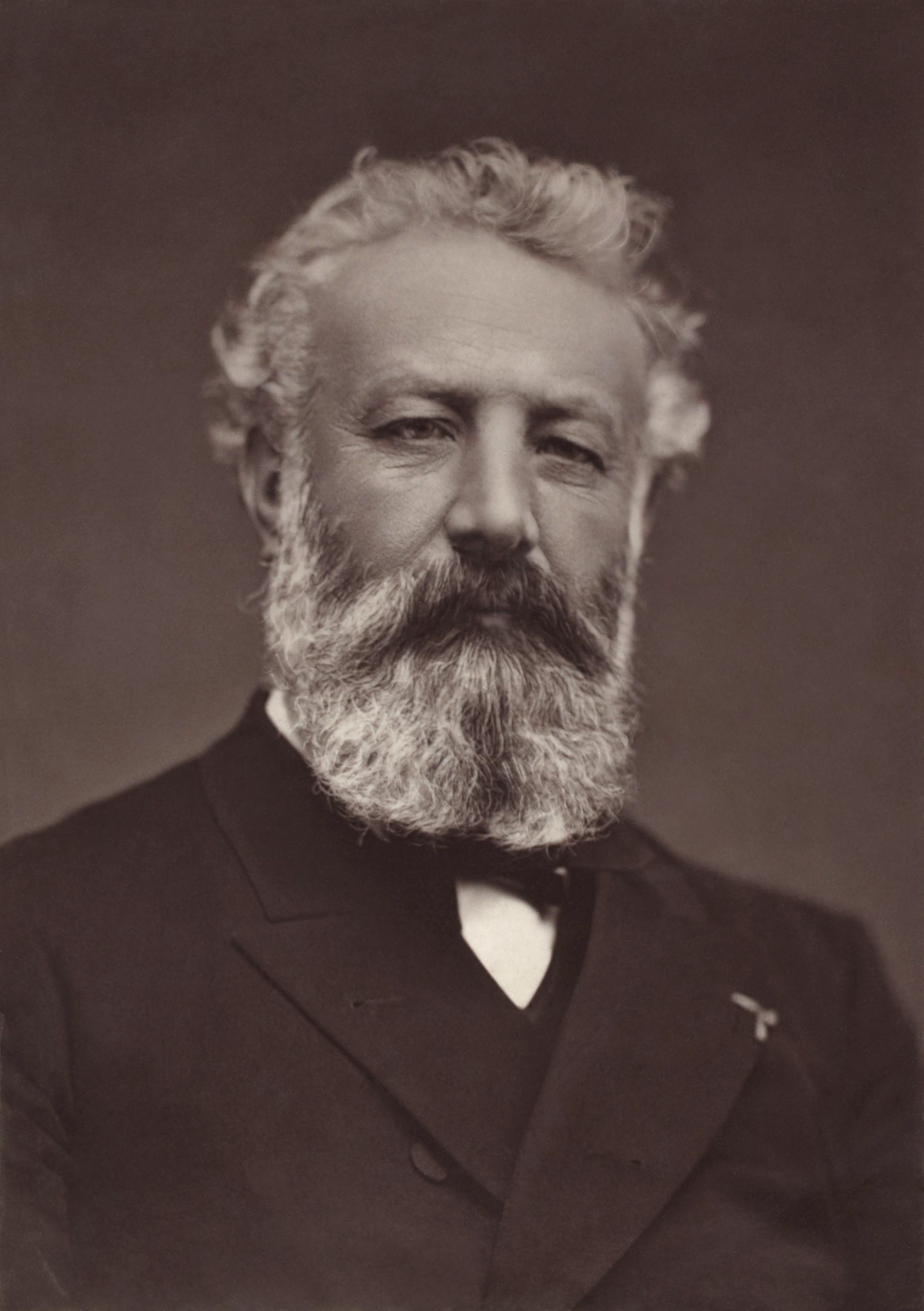
Jules Verne

The "Trophy Jules Verne" was the subject of a public order of the visual arts delegation with the American artist Tom Shannon and is patroned by the French Ministry of Culture.

The work is a floating hull on a magnetic field, much as an anchorage for a ship. All dimensions have symbolic meaning. The midship beam of the hull corresponds to the diameter of the Earth, the ray of each end is proportional to that of the moon and the radius of the curvature of the frames is that of the sun. The competitors of the Trophy Jules Verne race around the Earth against time, with only the sun and the moon as companions and time keepers.

The sculpture is placed on a cast aluminium base, on which the names of the sailors having won the Trophy are engraved. The Musée national de la Marine in Paris hosts and maintains the Trophy. Each winner receives a miniature of the Trophy, magnetized like the original one.

When a record is broken, an official ceremony is held for the previous record holders to hand over the trophy to the new record holders, who are given the hull and must place it in its magnetic field mooring.

== See also ==
- Circumnavigation
- List of circumnavigations
- List of youth solo sailing circumnavigations
- Around the world in 80 days

Competitions and prizes

- Global Challenge
- Jules Verne Trophy
- The race
- Oryx Quest
- Vendée Globe

Other speed sailing records

- Speed sailing record
- World Sailing Speed Record Council
- Transatlantic sailing record
- Around the world sailing record
