= 1977–1978 Whitbread Round the World Race =

Round the World Yacht Race

1977–78 Whitbread Round the World Race
Event title
- Edition: 2nd
- Yachts: Multi-class

Competitors
- Competitors: 15

Results
- Winner: Flyer

The 1977–78 Whitbread Round the World Race was the second edition of the around-the-world sailing event Whitbread Round the World Race. On 27 August 1977, 15 boats started out from Portsmouth for the Whitbread Round the World Race under a moderate Northerly breeze and light patchy rain. Most of the second Whitbread Race was dominated by a tight race between Swan 65 King's Legend and Flyer, the latter eventually winning the race. All 15 boats finished the 26,780-nautical-mile (49,600 km) race. Great Britain II was winner on elapsed time for the second race in succession. This race was notable for the fact that Clare Francis became the first woman to skipper a Whitbread entry, the Swan 65 ADC Accutrac.

== Legs ==
Leg	Start	Finish	Leg winner (elapsed time)	Leg winner (corrected time)
1	Portsmouth, England	Cape Town, South Africa	Flyer	Flyer
2	Cape Town, South Africa	Auckland, New Zealand	Heath's Condor	33 Export
3	Auckland, New Zealand	Rio de Janeiro, Brazil	Great Britain II	Gauloise II
4	Rio de Janeiro, Brazil	Portsmouth, England	Heath's Condor	Gauloise II

== Results ==
Overall Pos	Line Honours Pos	Sail Number	Yacht	Country	Yacht Type	LOA (Metres)	Skipper	Elapsed Time d:hh:mm:ss	Corrected time d:hh:mm:ss
1	2	H 2398	Flyer	Netherlands	Sparkman & Stephens 65 Ketch	19.86	Cornelis van Rietschoten	136:05:28:48	119:01:00:36
2	3	K 1220	King's Legend	(United Kingdom) Great Britain	Sparkman & Stephens Swan 65	19.68	Nick Ratcliffe	138:15:47:23	121:11:17:23
3	9	EUR 1	Traité de Rome	Europe	Sparkman & Stephens 51 Sloop	15.60	Philippe Hanin	154:20:58:12	121:18:50:59
4	4	Z 888	Disque d'Or	Switzerland	Sparkman & Stephens Swan 65	19.68	Pierre Fehlmann	142:00:47:48	122:10:56:23
5	6	K 1888	ADC Accutrac	(United Kingdom) Great Britain	Sparkman & Stephens Swan 65	19.68	Clare Francis	145:15:28:11	126:20:18:36
6	10	F 4279	Gauloises II	France	Tabarly 57 Ketch	17.45	Eric Loizeau	156:23:00:36	127:07:54:28
7	12	K 3138	Adventure	(United Kingdom) Great Britain	Camper-Nicholson 55 Sloop	16.76	James Watts; David Leslie; Ian Bailey-Willmot; Robin Duchesne	158:14:12:35	128:02:54:28
8	8	F 515	Neptune	France	Mauric 60 Sloop	18.30	Bernard Deguy	152:05:33:35	130:11:52:48
9	11	I 5555	B&B Italia	Italy	Gurney 54 Sloop	16.46	Corrado di Majo	157:05:34:48	132:02:22:47
10	15	F 4390	33 Export	France	Mauric 57 Yawl	17.37	Alain Gabbay	164:15:31:47	133:00:33:11
11	7	H 2422	Tielsa	Netherlands	Elsenga 67 Ketch	20.50	Dirk Nauta	148:13:22:11	133:00:36:00
12	1	K 3566	Great Britain II	(United Kingdom) Great Britain	Gurney 77 Sloop Maxi	23.52	Robert James	134:12:22:47	134:10:43:11
13	13	K 1218	Debenhams	(United Kingdom) Great Britain	Holman-Pye 57 Ketch	17.40	John Ridgway	161:05:05:23	135:19:49:48
14	14	F 7204	Japy-Hermés	France	McCurdy-Rhodes 63 Ketch	19.20	Jean-Michel Viant	164:01:29:23	143:06:00:00
15	5	K 707	Heath's Condor	(United Kingdom) Great Britain	Sharp 77 Sloop Maxi	23.48	Leslie Williams; Robin Knox-Johnston	143:01:41:59	144:00:09:35
