= List of yachts built by Royal Huisman =

This is a list of all the yachts built by Royal Huisman, sorted by year.

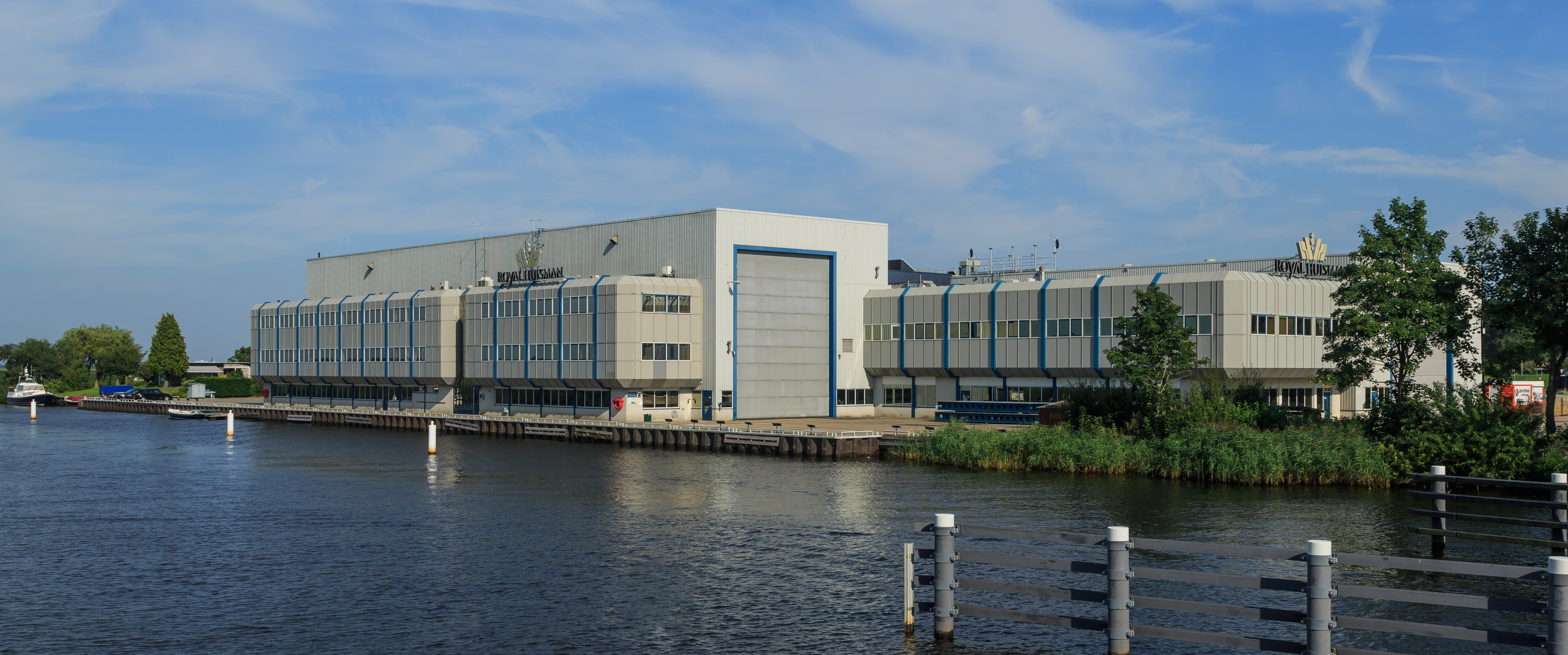
Royal Huisman yard in Vollenhove, The Netherlands

Was the longest yacht upon completion.

== 1965-1974 ==
Year	Length overall in metres	Name
1965	9.6	Sabina II
1965	9.6	Abeltje
1965	9.6	Ronduite
1966	9.6	Se Sa Plane
1966	9.6	Gof III
1967	9.6	Avenir
1967	9.6	Ellen
1967	9.6	Mamoura
1967	10.7	Arwin
1967	9.6	(Yard number 219)
1967	8.4	Alumaat
1967	13.4	(Yard number 231)
1968	8.4	Spinel
1968	9.6	(Yard number 222)
1968	9.6	(Yard number 223)
1968	9.6	(Yard number 224)
1968	10.6	Rasbora
1968	10.6	Sabina III
1968	8.4	Manta
1968	9.6	(Yard number 228)
1968	10.6	Catacumba
1968	9.6	(Yard number 230)
1968	9.6	Gioia
1968	12	Zeeridder
1968	10	March. Hare
1968	10	Doxy
1968	10	East Wind
1968	7.6	Ecume de Mer
1969	11.7	Easy Rider
1969	8.4	Goodewind II
1969	9.8	(Yard number 236)
1969	10	Hustler
1969	13.4	Caldara
1969	11.7	Pinta I
1969	9.8	Phaselas
1969	10	Windmill
1969	10	Margriet
1969	10	Kobold
1969	18.5	Running Tide
1970	13.6	Bethe-a-Belle III
1970	11	Senta
1970	12.1	Ruta Ria
1970	10	Nibelung III
1970	12.9	Scalpel
1970	15.5	Via Maris
1971	12.1	Saint Malo
1971	16.7	Kohinoor
1971	13.7	Prospect of Whitby I
1971	13	(Yard number 259)
1972	12	Goia II
1972	12	Sabina IV
1972	12.5	Pinta II
1972	12.7	Winsome
1972	14.2	Prospect of Whitby III
1972	11.2	Revolution
1972	11.8	America Jane II
1973	19.8	Benbow
1973	14.2	Saudade I
1973	12.7	Green Highlander III
1973	11.4	Ojala II
1973	13.4	Spirit of Delft
1973	11.7	Wanton II
1974	16	Noryema IX
1974	14.2	Struntje
1974	12.1	Vineta
1974	14.6	More Opposition
1974	13.5	Bollemaat
1974	14.7	Mandrake (later Azahara)
1974	10.8	Sumbra

== 1975-1984 ==
Year	Length overall in metres	Name
1975	9.4	Flamenca
1975	13.4	Prospect of Whitby III
1975	20	Gitana VI
1975	13.4	Dorothea
1975	15.6	Pinta III
1975	12.5	Deleste
1975	15.6	Saudade (II)
1975	18.3	Lady Irene
1975	16	Whistle Wing V
1976	16.4	Bestevaer
1976	14.4	Evrika
1976	15.3	Emeraude
1976	11	Sabina V
1976	10	Dumonveh
1976	10	Orion
1976	10	Stormy Petrel
1976	21	(Yard number 296)
1977	19.9	Flyer I
1977	10	Lovely Lady
1977	15.4	Su Chan
1977	16.2	Fantasque
1978	12.5	Spirit of Nemo
1978	12.9	(Yard number 303)
1978	13.4	Wanderwolf
1978	13.2	Surprise
1978	15.9	World of Love
1978	12.5	Ocean Bound
1979	12.5	Canisvliet
1979	12.5	Wanderer
1979	12.5	Jolly Duck
1979	12.5	Nessie
1979	12.7	Windsom Gold
1979	11.3	Pomacanthus
1979	11.3	Coracle
1979	11.3	Surveyor
1979	11.3	Bishy Bee
1979	15.3	Midnight Sun
1979	13.4	Aaron
1979	10.4	Schini
1980	11.3	Blue Bell
1980	17.1	Yonder I
1980	23.2	Helisara
1981	11.3	Klieuw
1981	11.3	Sandettie
1981	18	Fly
1981	23.2	Flyer II
1981	12.1	Marlijn
1981	12.1	Sabina VI
1981	24.72	Belle Fontaine
1982	24	Volador
1982	12.7	Bierkaai
1983	24.7	Huaso
1983	34	Thor III
1984	18.3	Seillan
1984	28.3	Cyclos II

== 1985-1994 ==
Year	Length overall in metres	Name	Reference
1985	13.5	Baya	
1985	21.3	Hetairos	
1986	31.45	Whirlwind XII	
1986	26	Ebb Tide	
1987	34	Acharné	
1987	23.3	Happy Joss	
1988	19.5	Yonder II	
1988	25.6	Foftein I	
1990	42.36	Cyclos III	
1991	22.3	Coro Coro	
1992	25.5	Metolius	
1993	43.58	Juliet	
1994	44	Borkumriff III	
1994	34.25	Saudade III	
1994	20.8	Deneb	
1994	15.4	Sayonara	

== 1995-2004 ==
Year	Length overall in metres	Name	Reference
1995	40.28	Anakena	
1995	19.3	Zwerver	
1997	41	Surama	
1998	47.42	Hyperion	
1999	30.21	Foftein II	
1999	34.2	Pamina	
2000	34.17	Spiip	
2002	50.58	Borkumriff IV	
2003	39.92	Maria Cattiiva	
2004	90	Athena	

== 2005-2014 ==
Year	Length overall in metres	Name	Reference
2005	40	Antares	
2006	35.8	Arcadia	
2006	32	Gliss	
2007	51.59	Meteor	
2009	58.04	Ethereal	
2009	42.1	Hanuman	
2010	57.49	Twizzle	
2012	55	Kamaxitha	
2012	36.58	Pumula	
2013	43.31	Blue Papillon	
2014	51.8	Elfje	
2014	47.65	Wisp	

== 2015-present ==
Year	Length overall in metres	Name	Reference
2015	43.31	Sea Eagle I	
2015	37.3	Action	
2017	20	Aileen II	
2017	58	Ngoni	
2018	56	Aquarius	
2020	81	Sea Eagle II	
2021	58.5	PHI	

== Under construction ==
Planned delivery	Length overall in metres	Name	Reference
2022	59.7	Project 404 / MM597	
2022	46	Project 405 / Nauta	
2023	52	Project 406	
TBA	65	Project 408	

== Concept ==
Name	Length overall in metres	Reference
Lotus + Lotus Companion	88 & 70	
Sangi	55	
Royal Huisman 43	43	
Royal Huisman 58	58	
Marlin	49	
Sailing Cat	33.5	
Power Cat	36.2	
Dart50	50	
Dart65	65	
Dart80	80	
Pura	38–43	
Pura Flybridge	38–43	
Apex 850	88	

== See also ==
- List of large sailing yachts
- Luxury yacht
- Sailing yacht
