= Condor of Bermuda =

Racing yacht

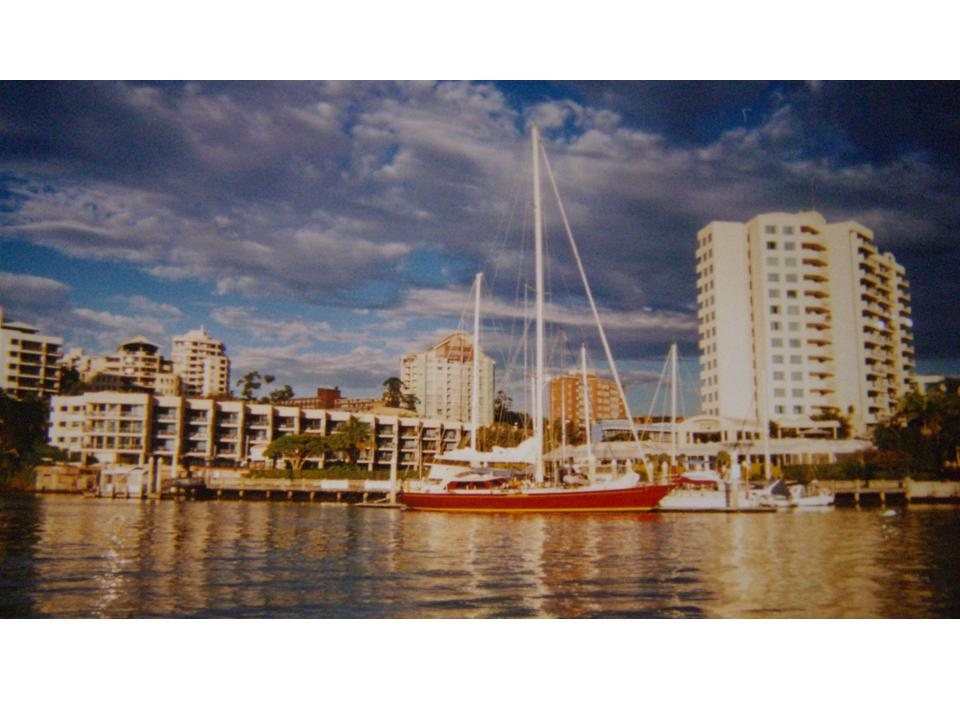
- Condor of Bermuda, in Brisbane, Australia, under cruising colours in 2004.
- Other names: Heath's Condor; Condor of Bermuda
- Nation: United Kingdom; Bermuda
- Class: Maxi
- Sail no: K–707, KB–87
- Designer(s): John Sharp; Bruce Farr (re-fit)
- Builder: Bowman Construction Ship Yard; Emsworth, UK
- Owner(s): Bob Bell

Racing career
- Skippers: Sir Peter Blake; Sir Robin Knox-Johnston
- Notable victories: 1981 Sydney–Hobart (l.h.); 1979 Fastnet (l.h.)

Condor of Bermuda is a maxi yacht campaigning under the leadership and funding of London-based international businessman Bob Bell. Originally called Condor but renamed Heath's Condor for the 1977–78 Whitbread Round the World Race after Bell's association with Heath's Insurance Co (London). There is no link with former British prime minister Edward Heath of Morning Cloud yachting fame. Condor was then later renamed Condor of Bermuda, as government policy in the UK during the 1970s effectively exiled the financing of such a campaign by making the funding and domiciling of such an endeavour from the home countries a practical impossibility.

Condor of Bermuda is a polished mahogany race boat; and is often confused with its successor, Condor (sometimes referred to as Condor II, which was of Kevlar and composite construction, and slightly larger, due to IOR rule changes. The two boats were colloquially known as The Grand Piano and Plastic Condor or the Brown Bus by those who had sailed on both.

Condor of Bermuda campaigned from 1977 to approximately 1983.

== Notable facts ==
- It was the first yacht to race with a carbon fibre mast in 1977 in the Whitbread Around the world Race.
- After developing a substantial lead, Heath's Condor was ultimately uncompetitive in the first leg (UK to Cape Town), due to a catastrophic rig failure.
  - Won the second leg (Cape Town to Auckland, New Zealand)
  - Second in the third leg (cracked mast)(Auckland to Rio de Janeiro)
  - First in the fourth (final leg) (Rio de Janeiro to Portsmouth)
  - Placed last on elapsed time due to first leg; subsequent races were amended to give yachts a better chance after a single leg mishap.
- Condor was the primary competition for Whitbread outsider Pen Duick VI – a French sponsored, uranium ballasted unrecognised entrant to the 1977–78 Whitbread Around the World Race.

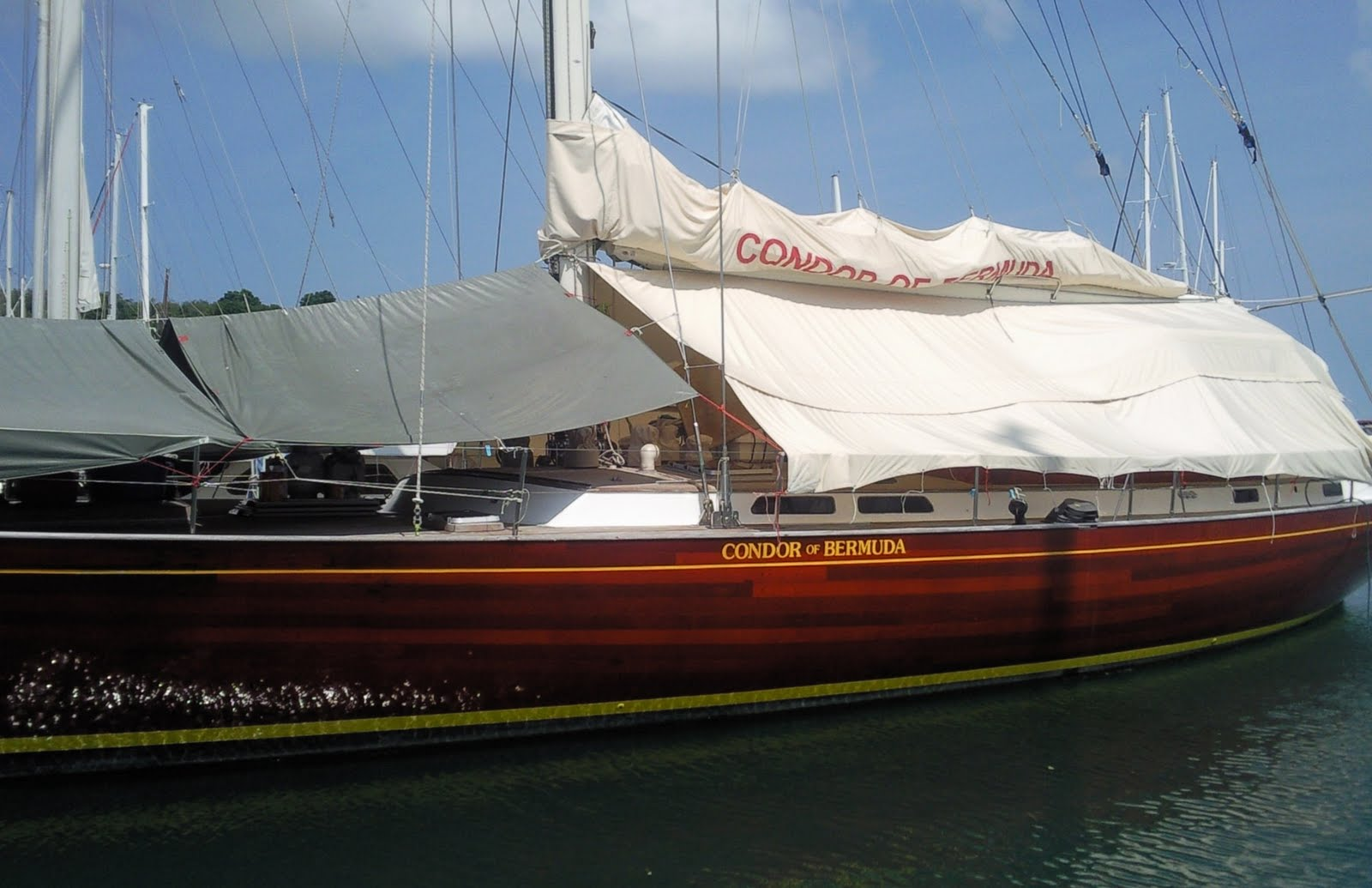
Condor of Bermuda moored in Asia – 2009

- Current record holder for:
  - Last British vessel to win a leg of the Around the World Yacht Race see Volvo Ocean Race
  - Narrowest margin for victory – 1981 Sydney to Hobart (see below)
- Won line honours (first boat to finish) in the tragic 1979 Fastnet race in record time.
- Won the Sydney to Hobart (1981) which was the closest ever finish, winning by just seven seconds against Apollo III during a gruelling match race up the River Derwent.
- Damaged on a reef in Tahiti in 1980. Salvaged, rebuilt, and re-campaigned. See: Marlon Brando's Island, Tetiaroa.
- Won Heather Cup – Auckland Anniversary Regatta (1979 & ??).
- 1984–87: Converted for cruising
- Sailed in the South Pacific, Great Barrier Reef, and completed several Sydney-Hobart's under the cruising category, with original owner Bob Bell.
- Last seen in Thailand, coming out of refit.
- Last seen in Viareggio in the Arpeca Spa yard.

== See also ==
- Yachting
