= Great Britain II =

Racing yacht

- Other names: United Friendly; Norsk Data GB; With Integrity; Whitbread Heritage
- Nation: United Kingdom
- Designer(s): Alan Gurney
- Launched: 21 May 1973

Racing career
- Skippers: Chay Blyth; Cecilia Unger; Rob James; Bob Salmon; Andy Coghill

Specifications
- Displacement: 55 Tons
- Length: 77.5 Feet
- Beam: 18 Feet
- Mast height: 100 Feet
- Sail area: An Acre (23 sails)

Great Britain II (also United Friendly, Norsk Data GB, With Integrity, Whitbread Heritage) is a Maxi racing yacht launched by Princess Anne on 21 May 1973 named after the SS Great Britain, built by Isambard Kingdom Brunel which was the world's first "iron clad" steam ship and whose salvage from the Falklands was underwritten by Sir Jack Hayward. Sir Jack also funded the building of GB II.

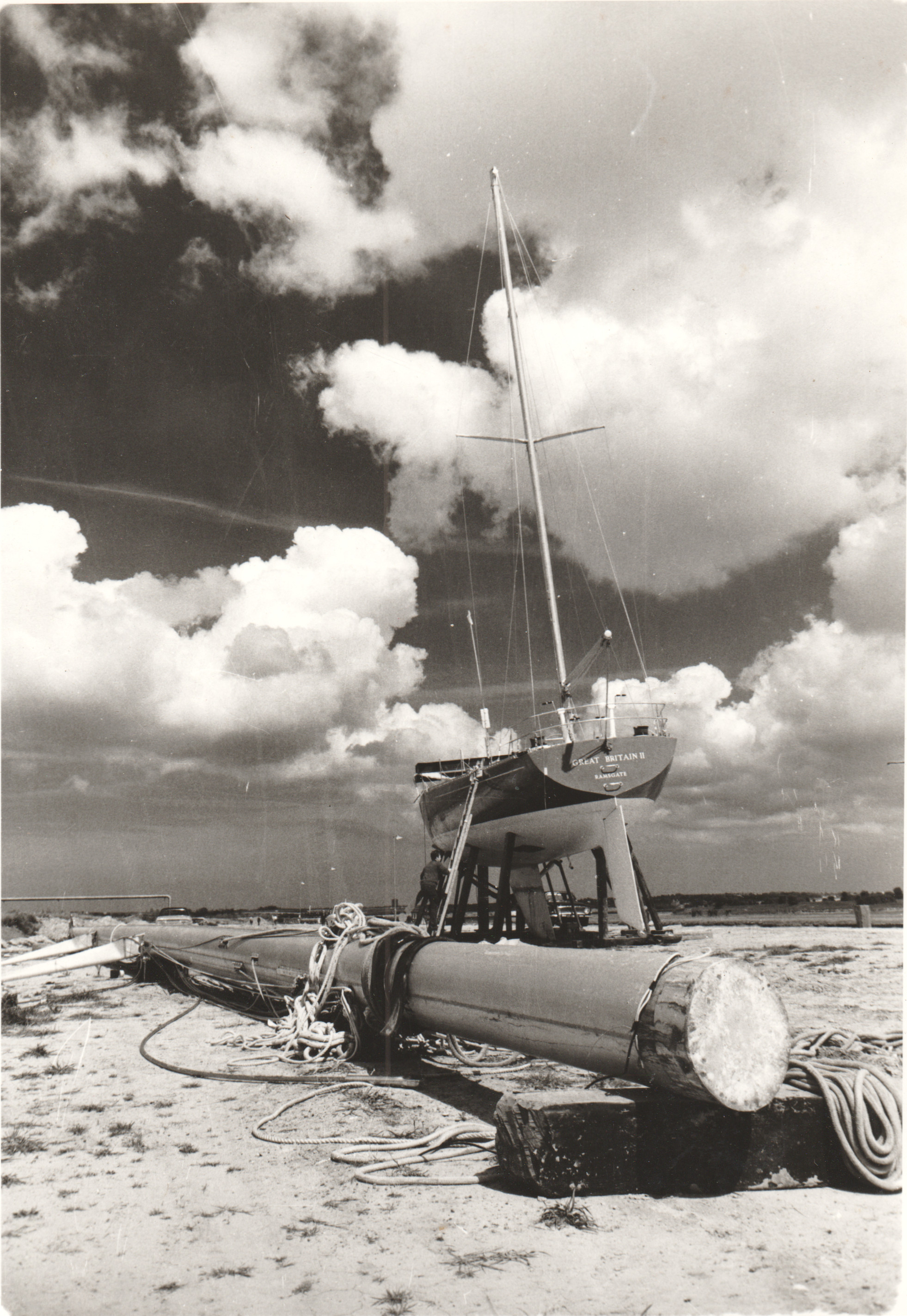
Great Britain II in Sandwich Kent. River Stour and Isle of Thanet in background.

== Background ==
She was originally designed to compete in the inaugural "Whitbread Round the World Race", by Alan Gurney, and was specifically built for Chay Blyth and a group of paratroopers, who would serve as the crew for the race.

She was constructed as a 77 ft sloop, and made of fiberglass and foam sandwich to achieve the lightest possible displacement.

Intended to be the fastest yacht in the world, she ultimately finished in second place on handicap, following behind the Mexican Swan 65 named Sayula II – which clinched the victory as the first winner of the Whitbread Round the World Race in 1973. It finished first when measured on elapsed time, having sailed 27,120 miles in 144 days 10 hours which set the world record for the circumnavigation of the world by a yacht. During the voyage one of the sailors (Bernie Hosking) was lost at sea.

Great Britain II has participated in all six Whitbread Round the World Races. Racing in the first five and "following" (not a registered participant) in the last, "transitional" Whitbread in 1993–94 under the name With Integrity, sailing with a shorthanded crew. The following year, the race became known as the Volvo Ocean Race.

The boat is currently named the Whitbread Heritage and has been in private ownership since 1996.

A model of the yacht is held at the National Maritime Museum, Greenwich.

In 2011, it sailed in the Volvo Ocean Race Legends Regatta but did not finish. The race was won by L’Esprit d'Équipe.

GB II is now being used as a charter vessel.
