= King's Legend =

Dutch-owned Swan65 sailing yacht

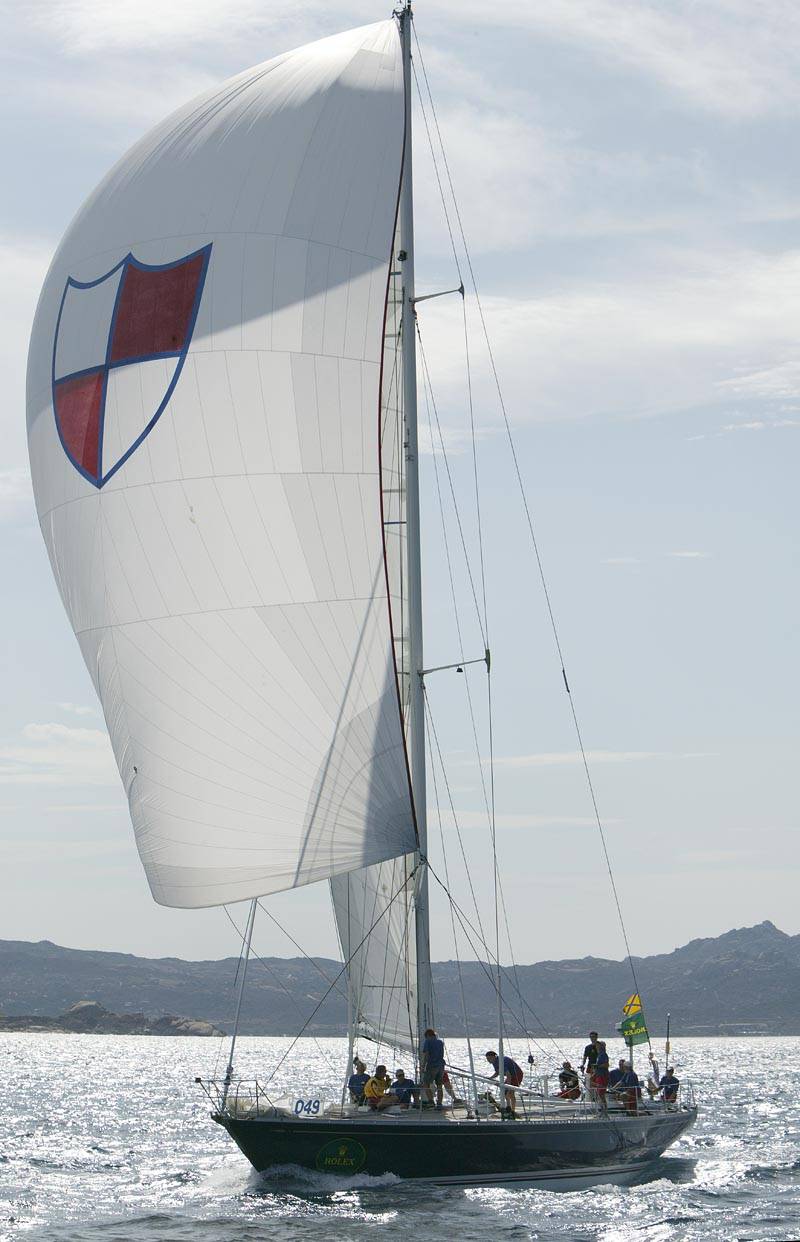
- King's Legend with spinnaker
- Class: Swan 65
- Sail no: NED–6572
- Builder: Sparkman & Stephens
- Launched: 1975
- Owner(s): Gijs van Liebergen

Specifications
- Displacement: 31,800 kg (70,100 lb)
- Length: 19.85 m (65.1 ft)
- Beam: 4.98 m (16.3 ft)
- Sail area: 200 m^{2} (2,200 sq ft)

King's Legend is a Swan 65 sailing yacht. She has competed in the Whitbread Around the World Race in '77-'78, in which she came second. She is owned by Dutchman Gijs van Liebergen, and is used for chartered cruises on the Caribbean, the Mediterranean Sea and northern Europe.

== Construction ==
King's Legend was constructed at the Finnish wharf Nautor's Swan in Jakobstad. She was commissioned by British businessman, Nick Ratcliff, who paid for the construction of the ship with his family's wealth. The yacht was designed by designer duo Sparkman & Stephens, who designed the majority of Nautor's Swan ships. Anticipating King's Legend's participation in the Whitbread Around the World Race two years later, the design deviated from the two-masted model that was standard at the time, using a single, somewhat taller mast instead. King's Legend was probably built in a year and a half, and upon completion, she was one of the fastest sailing yachts in the world.

King's Legend's first home port was in Cowes, on the Isle of Wight. This is where the ship's crew prepared for the Whitbread Race. Their training sessions went well, with the exception of a broken mast due to the forestay not being thick enough. The ship was sailed by a multinational crew of sailor friends, who were paid in room and board, but not in salary. One of the crew members was Skip Novak, a well-known sailor who later competed four times in the Volvo Ocean Race, the successor of the Whitbread Race. According to Novak, he was "in the right place at the right time" to join King's Legend's crew as its navigator, owing the position to meeting Ratcliff by chance at the bar of the Fountain Hotel in Cowes and "a handshake over a pint of ale."

== Career ==
=== Whitbread Race ===
On the 27th of August, 1977, the second Whitbread Race took off at Portsmouth, featuring fifteen competing yachts. Most of the second Whitbread Race was dominated by a head to head race between King's Legend and Flyer, a yacht representing the Netherlands and navigated by Conny van Rietschoten. Contrary to the current Volvo Ocean Race, the Whitbread Race was sailed by pioneers. Navigation was done by sextant and radio direction finder, and taking great risks could be rewarding, for example by passing the south pole as closely as possible.

Flyer and King's Legend left the other competitors far behind. During the first stage, a thousand nautical miles before Cape Town, both ships were still within visual range of each other, but in the end Flyer managed to win the first stage by 2 hours and 4 minutes. During the second stage, from Cape Horn to New Zealand, King's Legend managed to get ahead of the Flyer by 360 nautical miles, until a leak was discovered at the rudderpost. It took two days to get it under control. Novak described the event as "a stark reminder that these are desolate oceans populated only by albatross, whales and ice, with no shipping within thousands of miles."." The incident cost King's Legend a large portion of the lead.

During the third stage, between New Zealand and Brazil, the crew lost their SSB radio, completely cutting the ship off from the outside world. Without access to weather reports, King's Legend ended up lagging behind the competition.

Throughout the Whitbread Race, King's Legend was plagued by financial trouble. Reportedly, Conny van Rietschoten, Ratcliff's primary opponent, gave the crew financial support in order to keep the ship in the race. He allegedly paid an outstanding hotel bill in South Africa, and donated roughly $30,000 to King's Legend further on in the race. Ratcliff is also said to have refused to finish in England due to a consumption tax debt he still owed the British tax administration. Lowered morale among the crew eventually had Ratcliff back down. King's Legend finished in Portsmouth with a travel time of 121 days and 11 hours, earning her second place.

=== After the Whitbread Race ===
Nick Ratcliff's financial trouble after the race forced him to sell the ship. The buyer was a diamond trader from New York, who owned the ship for only a brief time and mainly used her for celebrations on the Hudson. In the first twenty years after the Whitbread Race, the ship changed ownership various times. King's Legend has been in Lebanese, Belgian and Norwegian hands, and has sailed all over the world, from Australia to South Africa and the Caribbean.

Since 1999, King's Legend belongs to a Dutch owner. She was bought from a Norwegian businessman, and was in a bad condition at the time. The ship was renovated in five months at a wharf in IJmuiden. She was outfitted with new sails and a new teak deck, among other changes. The ship's interior was sanded and lacquered, but is otherwise still in the original state. After this refit, King's Legend has been sailing around the Mediterranean Sea, the Caribbean and northern Europe. She is currently mainly a pleasure cruise ship, but she also competes in various competitions. King's Legend competed in the Antigua Sailing Week, Sint Maarten Heineken Regatta, Voiles de Saint-Tropez and both Swan Cups, and will be competing in the Fastnet Race and various other races in the future.

== Origin of the name King's Legend ==
The name King's Legend originates from an old English legend. A thousand years ago, three English kings were plagued by devastating raids by pillaging Vikings. The three kings decided to work together and devised a plan. They gathered up all their treasures, buried them separately on their lands and put a curse on them.

When the Vikings returned, the villagers led them to the first buried treasure. The Vikings loaded the treasure onto their ships and sailed off, happy with the abundant loot. On the way home, however, they ended up in a great storm and the entire fleet was lost to the waves.

The second time Viking raiders came, the villagers led them to the second buried treasure. The Vikings once again eagerly dug up the treasure, had a great feast and sailed home. Once home, they turned out to have been infected with a deadly disease that caused an epidemic in their village and nearly wiped it out altogether. The Vikings decided to avoid that part of England henceforth.

Years later, a nearly broke businessman decided to invest his last money in a racing horse, in an all-or-nothing last-ditch effort. He called this horse Kings' Legend, after the above legend. The horse won the race, and the businessman's luck changed for the better again. In honor of the three kings and their legend, he had a mansion built at the site where the last remaining treasure was believed to be buried. He named the mansion Kings' Legend as well. Upon his death in the late nineteenth century, the mansion was bought by the Ratcliff family.

When the young Nick Ratcliff bought a sailing yacht to compete in the Whitbread Race, he expected to need all the luck he could get. He named the ship Kings' Legend.

Over the years, the apostrophe in the name was accidentally shifted from Kings' Legend to King's Legend, yielding the ship's current name.

== Crew during the Whitbread Race ==
Name	Nationality
Ted Allison	United States
Chris Barker	New Zealand
Richard Bertie	South Africa
Dave Birchenough .	United States
Jean Blondiau	Belgium
Jack Bossert	United States
Mike Clancy	United States
Bryan Dawson	New Zealand
Chuck McKee	United States
Skip Novak	United States
Bill Porter	United Kingdom
Nick Ratcliff	United Kingdom
Hans Savamaki	Finland
Greg Tuxworth	United States

Note: This may not be a complete list.
