= Conny van Rietschoten =

Dutch yacht racer

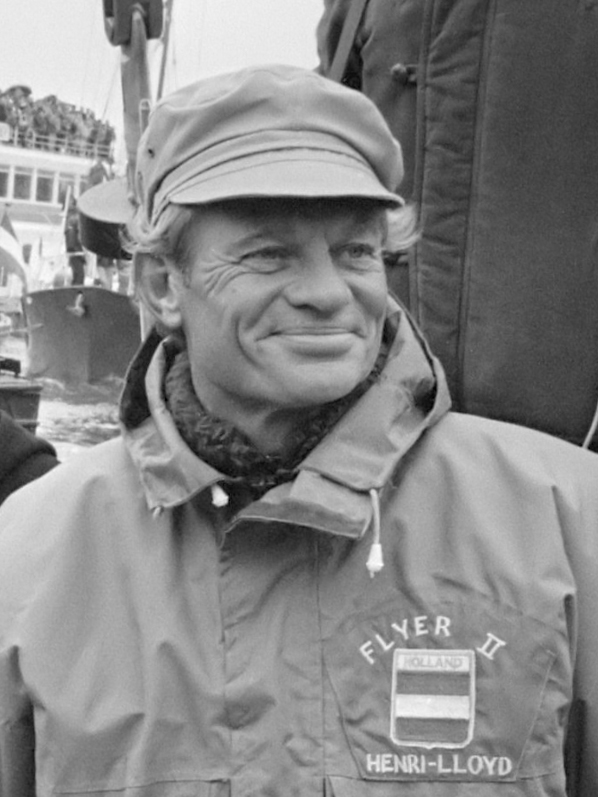
- Conny van Rietschoten (1982)

Personal information
- Full name: Cornelis van Rietschoten
- Nickname: The Flying Dutchman
- Nationality: Dutch
- Born: 26 March 1926 Rotterdam, Netherlands
- Died: 17 December 2013 (aged 87) Portugal

Sailing career
- Country: Netherlands
- Sport: Sailing
- Event: Whitbread Round The World Race

Cornelis "Conny" van Rietschoten (23 March 1926 – 17 December 2013) was a Dutch yacht skipper who was the only skipper to win the Whitbread Round the World Race (now known as The Ocean Race) twice: a feat that has not been matched since.

== Background ==
Born in Rotterdam, Van Rietschoten had been sailing since he was three, and continued until tuberculosis interrupted both his sailing and business career in the early 1960s. He spent a year recovering in a Swiss sanatorium, and then threw all his energies into developing the family electrical engineering business, Van Rietschoten & Houwens.

A circumnavigation was something his father, Jan Jacob, had always wanted to do but never found the time.

== Whitbread Round the World Race ==
At 45, the industrialist had retired from active business and was looking for a fresh challenge. He had read reports about the first Whitbread Race, saw it as the opportunity of a lifetime – and grabbed it with both hands. Van Rietschoten was unknown as a sailor even in his own waters before competing in the 1977–78 Whitbread Round the World Race.

What set Van Rietschoten ahead of the established sailing names like Sir Robin Knox-Johnston and Éric Tabarly was a professional business approach to his campaigns. His eight-year tenure at the top of the sport spelled the end of amateur gung-ho ocean racing entries. He may well have continued to see himself as an amateur, but he set levels of professionalism within the sport that were not repeated until Peter Blake also won every leg with his Steinlager 2 in the 1989–90 Whitbread Round the World Race.

Van Rietschoten was first to undertake extensive trials and crew training before the race, and invested in research to improve crew clothing, rigs and weather forecasting techniques.

For his first Whitbread yacht, Conny van Rietschoten turned to American designers Sparkman & Stephens to design a more modern version of the ketch-rigged Swan 65 production yacht Sayula II, which had won the first Whitbread race in 1973/74. Like the first, 20m / 65 ft Flyer, also the new Flyer was built in aluminium by Jachtwerf W. Huisman. Germán Frers was the designer for the 23m / 76 ft sloop design of Flyer II.

After winning the transatlantic race, the Flyer crew found their greatest rival to be another Swan 65, the sloop rigged British yacht King's Legend, with Nick Ratcliffe as the skipper and American Skip Novak as the navigator. 1,000 miles from Cape Town, the two crews found themselves within sight of each other, before Flyer pulled ahead to win the first leg of the race from Portsmouth by 2 hours 4 minutes. On the second leg to Auckland, New Zealand, King's Legend stole the upper hand, and soon had a 360mile lead over Flyer as the Whitbread fleet raced across the Southern Ocean, but then suffered a leak, which slowed her progress. At the finish, Conny van Rietschoten’s crew had cut King's Legend’s lead back to within 1 hour 15 minutes.

The third leg around Cape Horn to Rio de Janeiro proved something of an anti-climax as far as the race was concerned, for Kings Legend suffered a broach and water wiped out her radio. Without weather forecasts, Novak and his crew were at a distinct disadvantage and fell almost 60 hours behind Flyer.

On the final leg back to Portsmouth, Van Rietschoten and his crew had only to shadow Kings Legend home which they did, finishing 2 hours behind the British yacht, to win the Whitbread Race on handicap. Flyer was recently refitted by the original manufacturer

The 1981/82 Whitbread Race saw Conny van Rietschoten’s maxi sloop Flyer II matched against Peter Blake’s 68 ft Bruce Farr designed Ceramco New Zealand. Ceramco New Zealand was dismasted during the first leg to give Flyer II a run-away victory on this first stage of the race to Cape Town, but thereafter, the two yachts raced neck-and-neck around the rest of the world.

It was at the height of this competition when Conny van Rietschoten showed the steely side of his character. He suffered a heart attack when their yacht was deep into the Southern Ocean, en route to Auckland, New Zealand. Van Rietschoten swore his crew to secrecy, and would not even allow the Flyer II doctor Julian Fuller to call a cardiologist aboard their rival yacht Ceramco for advice. “The nearest port was 10 days away and the critical period is always the first 24–36 hours,” he recalled later. “Ceramco was already breathing down our necks. If they had known that I had a health problem, they would have pushed their boat even harder. When you die at sea, you are buried over the side. Perhaps those Ceramco boys might then have spotted me drifting by. And that I was determined would be the only thing they would see or hear from Flyer II on the matter!”

Flyer II pulled out a 9 hour lead by Auckland, but Ceramco New Zealand won the leg on handicap. The race from there to Cape Horn was one of constantly swapping places. Half way across the Pacific, they were within sight of each other, and also rounded Cape Horn together. Flyer II got to Mar del Plata first to take line honours, but the Ceramco New Zealand crew were rewarded with 2nd on handicap.

Conny van Rietschoten and his crew finished first again back at Portsmouth, followed by Ceramco New Zealand to take line honours for the Race, and with the rest of the fleet becalmed near the Azores, took handicap honours too – the first crew to win both line and handicap honours in the history of the Race. Van Rietschoten and his crew also set two world records: The fastest Noon to Noon run of 327 miles, and the fastest circumnavigation of 120 days

In 1948, Conny van Rietschoten and his friend Morin Scott sailed their Dragon class yacht Gerda from Cowes England across the North Sea to Arendal to compete in that year's Dragon Gold Cup world championship. They did not win, but Crown Prince Olaf of Norway proclaimed the two sailors the best at the regatta for sailing by far the furthest distance.

On 17 December 2013, Conny van Rietschoten died of a stroke in Portugal.

== Legacy ==
Since the 1980s, the Conny van Rietschoten Trophy has been awarded each year to recognise the best Dutch sailors.
