= 1979 Fastnet Race =

1979 yacht disaster south of Ireland

Coordinates: 50.550°N 6.971°W

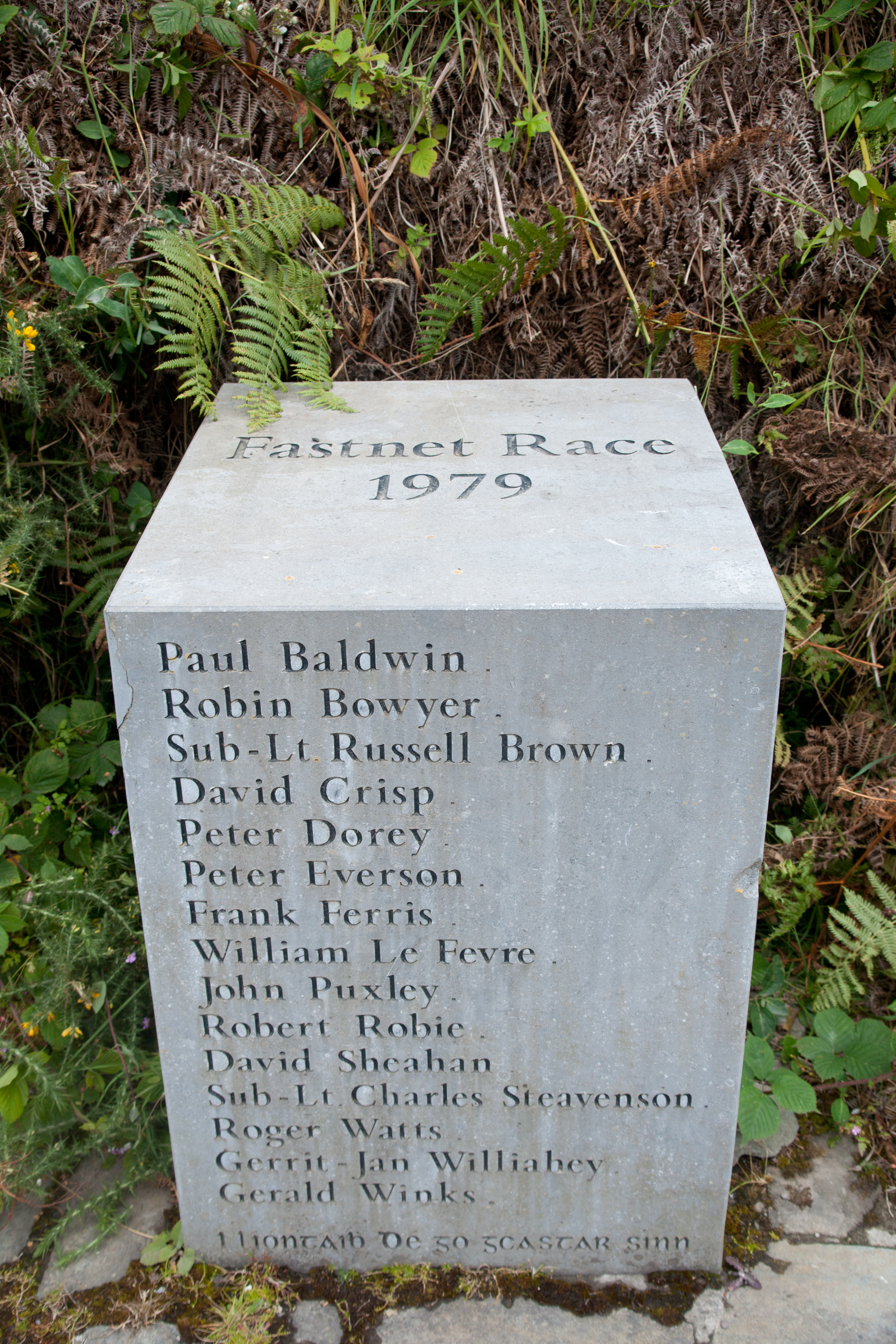
Memorial to the 15 competitors who died in the 1979 Fastnet Race, Lios Ó Móine (Lissamona), Cape Clear Island, Cork, Ireland; the 6 spectator names were added later.

The 1979 Fastnet Race was the 28th Royal Ocean Racing Club's Fastnet Race, a yachting race held generally every two years since 1925 on a 605-nautical-mile (1,120 km; 696 mi) course from Cowes direct to the Fastnet Rock and then to Plymouth passing south of the Isles of Scilly. In 1979, it was the climax of the five-race Admiral's Cup competition, as it had been since 1957. Immediately, and ever since, the 1979 race has been known worldwide as the deadliest in yachting history.

A worse-than-expected European windstorm on the third day of the race wreaked havoc on the 303 yachts that started the biennial race, resulting in 21 fatalities (15 yachtsmen and 6 spectators) during the early morning hours of 14 August in the Celtic Sea. Emergency services, naval forces, and civilian vessels from around the west side of the English Channel were summoned to aid what became the largest ever rescue operation in peace-time. This involved some 4,000 people, including the entire Irish Naval Service's fleet, lifeboats, commercial boats, and helicopters.

== Meteorological history ==
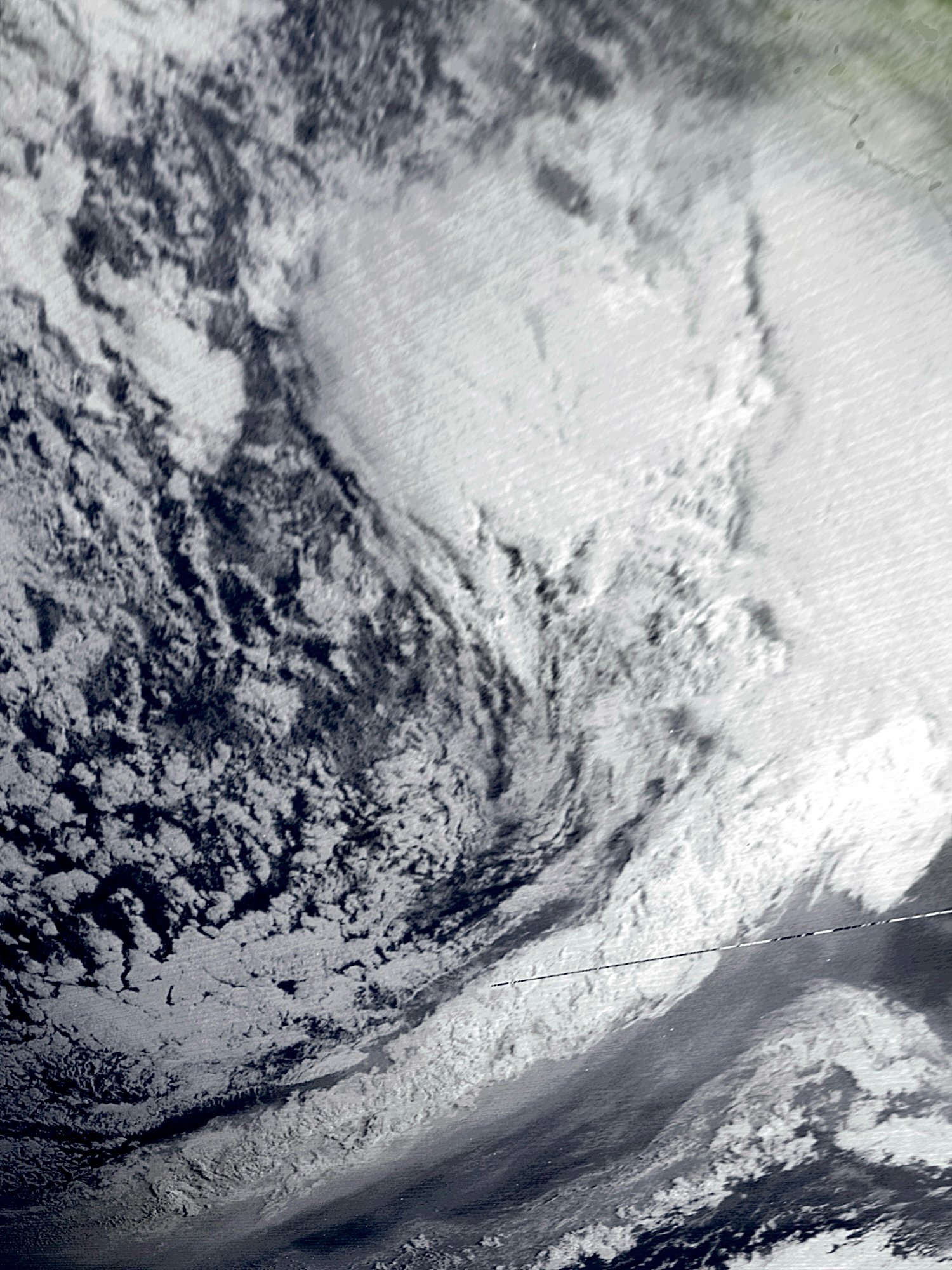
The windstorm responsible for the disaster approaching the British Isles, as seen on August 13 from SMS-2

The 1979 race started on 11 August. The BBC Radio Shipping Forecast, broadcast at 13:55 that day, predicted "south-westerly winds, force four to five increasing to force six to seven for a time." By 13 August, winds were reported at Force 6 with gusts of Force 7, and forecasters were predicting winds of Force 8. The leading boat, Kialoa, trailed closely by Condor of Bermuda, was on course to break the Fastnet record set eight years earlier.

A large depression named "low Y" formed over the Atlantic Ocean during the weekend of 11–12 August. On 13 August it began to intensify rapidly and turn northeastwards, reaching about 200 nautical miles (370 km; 230 mi) southwest of Ireland. By the 14th, the low was centred over Wexford. Land-based weather stations reported gale-force winds, with the strongest winds out to sea over the race area. The UK Meteorological Office assessed the maximum winds as Force 10 on the Beaufort scale; the majority of race competitors estimated the winds to have reached or exceeded Force 11. The official inquiry reported wind speeds reaching 60 knots (110 km/h; 70 mph) with little or no advance warning, and wave heights reaching 50 feet (15 m) in conflicting directions, conditions that were especially destructive for the smaller sailboats. The lowest recorded pressure was 979 hPa.

== Disaster and rescue mission ==
Over 13–14 August, of the 303 yachts that started, 24 were abandoned, of which five were lost and believed to be sunk, due to high winds and severe sea conditions. The Daily Telegraph (15 August 1979, p. 1) described the situation, where "Royal Navy ships, RAF Nimrod jets, helicopters, lifeboats, a Dutch warship HNLMS Overijssel and other craft picked up 125 yachtsmen whose boats had been caught in Force 11 violent storm strength gusts midway between Land's End and Fastnet". The effort also included tugs, trawlers, and tankers.

The coastguard requested support, resulting in a Nimrod aircraft from RAF Kinloss being ordered to the scene to act as the Scene of Search Coordinator. As the scale of the disaster became apparent, other rescue assets were requested and HMS Broadsword was ordered to the scene, taking over as the Scene of Search Coordinator on arrival at 17:30 on 14 August.

Fifteen competitors died in the race; at least 75 boats capsized and five sank. Adopting heaving to as a storm tactic proved to be a good preventive of capsize and turtling during the race. Lin Pardey wrote that none of the yachts which hove to were capsized or suffered any serious damage, but the official inquiry makes no such conclusion. One Fastnet participant, John Rousmaniere, wrote:

If there is a fault in this debate, it is that the factions sometimes say that one tactic or piece of gear is always right, regardless of the boat and the conditions. There is nothing always about a storm at sea except its danger.

The disaster resulted in a major rethink of racing, risks and prevention. Many safety improvements followed.

== Finishing yachts ==
The handicap winner was the yacht Tenacious, designed by Sparkman & Stephens and owned and skippered by Ted Turner. The winner of line honours was the 77-foot (23.5 m) SV Condor of Bermuda, skippered by Peter Blake, which gained around 90 minutes on the leader, the SV Kialoa, after rounding the Fastnet rock, by the calculated risk of setting a spinnaker sail in the high wind conditions. Jim Kilroy of the Kialoa had broken his ribs and there was damage to the yacht's runners. SV Condor of Bermuda broke the Fastnet record by nearly eight hours (71h 37m 23s).

=== Handicap results (first three in each class) ===
Class	Position	Yacht	Designer/Type/LOA (yacht type)	Owner (sailed by)	Corrected time hh:mm:ss
0	1	Tenacious	SS 61	Ted Turner	93:44:19
0	2	Condor of Bermuda	Sp 77	R. Bell	97:57:24
0	3	Kialoa		J. B. Kilroy	98:03:40
1	1	Red Rock IV	Fr	E. Mandelbaum	98:35:05
1	2	Acadia	Fr	B. Keenan	99:17:53
1	3	Gregal		M. Peche	99:52:39
2	1	Eclipse	PtR39	J. C. Rogers	97:05:27
2	2	Jubile VI	Pt 42	H. Hamon	97:40:15
2	3	Impetuous	Hd	G. Lambert and J. Crisp	97:53:53
3	1	Revolution	Fn 37	J. L. Fabry	97:42:53
3	2	Blue Bird	NI 34	A. Gerard	110:48:52
3	3	Ceil III	MW 40	W. Turnbull	116:33:18
4	1	Black Arrow	UFO 34	Royal Air Force S.A.	110:35:10
4	2	Samsara	Fr 33	Madame O. Trans-Van-Dom	110:44:19
4	2	Lorelei	SSH36	M. Catherineau	(Note: place awarded by Race Committee under rule 12 for loss of time in rescuing crew from yacht Griffin.)
4	3	Mahuri	UFO 34	G. M. Lowson	122:03:38
5	1	Assent (Note: Assent was the only Class 5 yacht to finish)	Contessa 32	W. and A. Ker	116:58:55

== Yachts that did not finish ==
Of the 303 starters, only 86 finished. There were 194 retirements and 24 abandonments (five of which were "lost believed sunk").

Early press reports were often confused. The Daily Telegraph (16 August 1979, p. 3) reported that 69 yachts did not finish.

- Accanito of France, broken rudder. Towed.
- Allamader. Abandoned.
- Alpha II
- Amanda Kulu
- Andiano Robin
- Angustura
- Animal
- Ariadne. Abandoned. *
- Arkadina
- Asteries
- Autonomy. Towed to Dunmore East.
- Ballydonna
- Battle Cry
- Billy Bones. Abandoned.
- Blue Dolphin
- Bonaventure of Britain. Abandoned.
- Cabadah Ocean Wave Option
- Callirhaex 3. Abandoned.
- Camargue of Britain. Abandoned.
- Casse Tete
- Charioteer of Britain. Sunk.
- Combat II. Retired to Cork.
- Corker
- Crazy Horse
- Détente
- Double O Two
- Enia
- Evergreen
- Farthing
- Fiestina Tertia. Abandoned. *
- Finndabar. Abandoned.
- Gan. Abandoned.
- Gekko
- Golden Apple of Ireland, disabled. Abandoned. Crew rescued by Royal Navy Wessex Helicopter.
- Golden Leigh
- Good in Tension A High Tension 36. Two knockdowns. Retired from race. Sailed to Crosshaven, Cork. Towed within the harbour by fishing vessel Mona Lisa.
- Griffin Abandoned – crew rescued from liferaft by Lorelei
- Grimalkin. Abandoned and subsequently recovered.
- Gringo. Reported as 'believed sunk'.
- Gunslinger. Broken rudder stock.
- Hestral. Abandoned. Crew of 6 rescued by Royal Navy helicopter.
- Hoodlum
- Impetuous
- Innovation
- Jan Pott of Flensburg, Germany. Broken mast.
- Juggernaut
- Kamisado, a UFO 34. Apart from two knockdowns Kamisado coped effectively with the storm and retired to Plymouth.
- Kestel. Abandoned.
- Korsar
- La Barbarelle
- Little Ella
- Magic of Britain. Sunk.
- Maligawa III. Abandoned.
- Marionette VII
- Mexxanini
- Mordicus Belgique, won 1981
- Morning Glory
- Mulligatawny
- Mutine
- Pachena
- Pegasus
- Ocean Wave
- Option2 of France, Granville
- Pepsi of Scotland. Broken rudder stock. Retired, no steerage. Several knockdowns. No communications. After 24 hrs towed by a French trawler into Kinsale.
- Pepsi of Holland
- Pinball Wizard
- Polar Bear of Britain. Sunk. Crew rescued.
- Polyhymnia. Retired and made her own way back to Plymouth.
- Regardless of Cork, broken rudder. Assisted by LÉ Deirdre (P20). Towed by Barnett-class lifeboat RNLB Ethel Mary.
- Samurai II
- Sandettie, a UFO 34 which was rolled, dismasted and swamped. However, Sandettie's crew were able to jury rig emergency rigging and sail to Land's End, whence they were towed to Penzance.
- Scaldis
- Scaramouche. Retired and made her own way back to Plymouth. Steve Cross remarked: "Although we hadn't the satisfaction of being one of the 88 which rounded 'the rock' we were content in knowing that we had brought the boat and ourselves back in one piece."
- Schuttevaer of Holland
- Silver Apple of Howth: lost steering, assisted by LÉ Deirdre (P20), made a jury steering rig, retired to Courtmacsherry under her own power.
- Sinndkabar
- Skat
- Sophia
- Sophie B
- Tam O'Shanter
- Tarantula of France
- Thunderer RAOC
- Trophy. Abandoned.
- Trumpeter. Retired after two knockdowns.
- Tiderace IV. Abandoned.
- Wild Goose of Singapore
- Yachtman of Spain
- Zap

== Craft that assisted the rescue mission ==
Over 4,000 people aided in the rescue efforts. The Royal Navy coordinated efforts to find around 80 vessels and rescue 136 crew members. Many organizations made key contributions:

=== Coastguard ===
- Maritime Rescue Co-ordination Centre, HMCG Land's End, UK
- MRCC Falmouth, UK
- MRCC Shannon, Ireland
- MRSC Brixham, UK
- Cross A, France

=== Royal Navy ===
- HMS Anglesey, Island class patrol vessel
- HMS Broadsword, frigate (Scene of Search Coordinator)
- HMSTY Dasher, yacht
- HMS Scylla (Leander-class frigate)
- RMAS Rollicker A502, ocean-going salvage tug
- RFA Tidespring, fast fleet tanker of the Royal Fleet Auxiliary
- 15 Royal Navy helicopters from RNAS Culdrose and RNAS Prestwick, including
  - Westland Sea Kings, 25 sorties for 110 hrs 45 mins
  - Westland Lynxes, 10 sorties for 20 hrs 55 mins
  - Westland Wessexes, 27 sorties for 62 hrs 35 mins

=== Royal Netherlands Navy ===
- HNLMS Overijssel, destroyer (race guardship)

=== Irish Naval Service ===
- LÉ Deirdre (P20), Deirdre class offshore patrol vessel

=== United States Navy ===
- USS Holland (AS-32), submarine tender, Holy Loch, Scotland

=== Lifeboats ===
These RNLI lifeboats spent 75 hours at sea in 60-knot (110 km/h) winds:

- RNLB Guy and Claire Hunter (ON 926), St Mary's, Isles of Scilly
- RNLB The Robert (ON 955), Baltimore, County Cork
- RNLB Ethel Mary (ON 949), Ballycotton, County Cork
- RNLB Sir Samuel Kelly,, Courtmacsherry Harbour, County Cork
- RNLB St Patrick (ON 1035), Dunmore East, County Waterford
- RNLB Solomon Browne (ON 954) Penlee Cornwall

Other RNLI Lifeboats called include St Ives, Clovelly, Falmouth, Sennen Cove, Padstow, Angle and The Lizard.

=== Royal Air Force ===
- Three helicopters
- Four Nimrods from RAF St Mawgan in Cornwall, and one from RAF Kinloss in Scotland

=== Irish Air Corps ===
- Beechcraft Kingair maritime patrol
- Alouette helicopter

=== Royal Ocean Racing Club ===
- Morningtown, Rodney Hill's Oyster 39 acted as the RORC escort and radio relay boat and was responsible for relaying the positions of the racing fleet.

== Fatalities and memorials ==
Between drowning and exposure, the storm killed 15 yachtsmen who were competing in the race, the deadliest in yachting history:

- Paul Baldwin
- Robin Bowyer
- SLt Russell Brown
- David Crisp
- Peter Dorey
- Peter Everson
- Frank Ferris
- William Le Fevre
- John Puxley
- Robert Robie
- David Sheahan
- SLt Charles Steavenson
- Roger Watts
- Gerrit-Jan Williahey or Willerink
- Gerald Winks

In addition, the storm killed 6 observers who were aboard two yachts shadowing the fleet to view the race:

- Olivia Davidson, John Dix, Richard Pendred, Peter Pickering (aboard Bucks Fizz)
- Denis Benson, David Moore (aboard Tempean)

The Fastnet Race Memorial at Holy Trinity Church, Cowes, Isle of Wight, was created in 2009 and lists 19 fatalities: the 15 competitors and the observers from Bucks Fizz. A similar memorial at Cape Clear Island harbour was first created in 2003, then updated in 2015 to list all 21 fatalities, including the observers from Tempean whose names were not widely publicized until then.

== See also ==
- 1998 Sydney to Hobart Yacht Race
