= Clare Francis =

British sailor and novelist (born 1946)

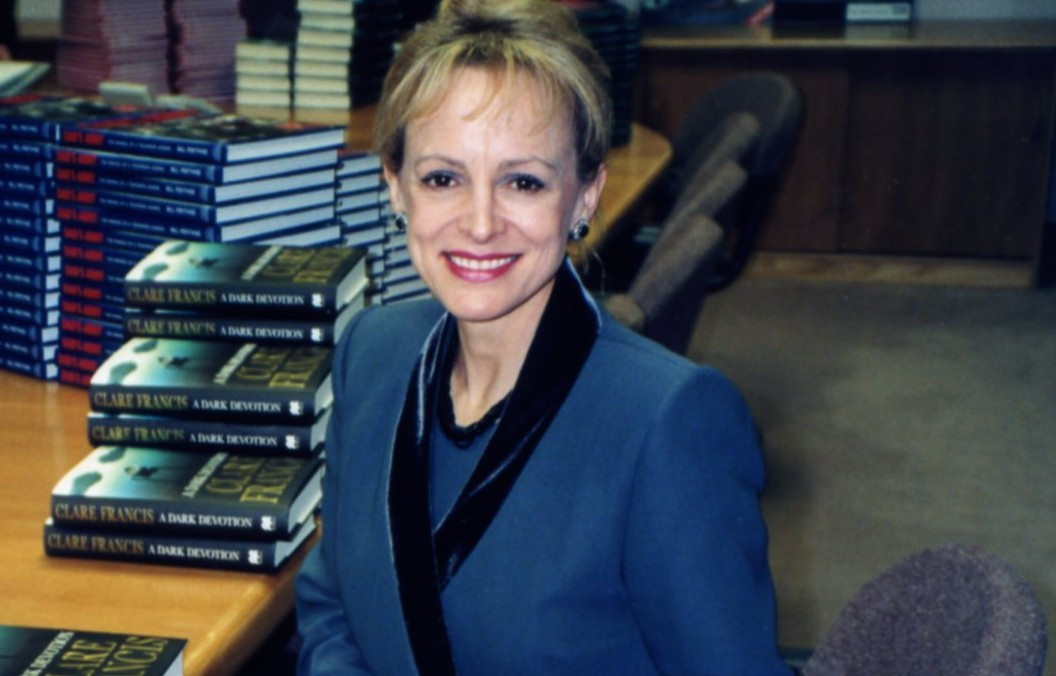
- book signing in 2008
- Born: 17 April 1946 (age 80); Thames Ditton, England
- Education: Royal Ballet School; University College London
- Occupation: writer
- Spouse: Jaques Robert Redon (m. 1977; div. 1986)
- Children: 1
- Website: https://www.clarefrancis.com/

Clare Mary Francis MBE (born 17 April 1946) is a British novelist who in her first career as a yachtswoman has twice sailed across the Atlantic on her own. She was the first woman to skipper a successful boat on the Whitbread Around the World race.

== Early life ==
Francis was born in Thames Ditton in Surrey and spent summer holidays on the Isle of Wight, where she learned to sail. She was educated at the Royal Ballet School, then gained a degree in economics at University College London.

== Sailing ==
In 1973, after working in marketing for three years, she took leave to sail singlehandedly across the Atlantic in the Nicholson 32 Gulliver G, departing from Falmouth in Cornwall and arriving, 37 days later, at Newport, Rhode Island. Following this, she received sponsorship to take part in the 1974 Round Britain Race with Eve Bonham, again in Gulliver G. They finished in third place. In 1975, she took part in the Azores and Back and the L'Aurore singlehanded races; and, in 1976, she competed in the Observer Singlehanded Transatlantic Race in her Ohlson 38 yacht Robertson's Golly, finishing thirteenth overall and setting a new women's single-handed transatlantic record. She also took part in that year's L'Aurore singlehanded race. During 1977 and 1978, she became the first woman to skipper a yacht in the Whitbread Round the World Race, finishing in fifth place in her Swan 65 ADC Accutrac.

== Personal life ==
Francis married a yachtsman Jacques Redon in 1977. He became a crew member on her yacht. They divorced in 1986; they had one child. Francis has chronic fatigue syndrome and is President of the UK charity Action for ME.

== Writing ==
After writing three accounts of her sailing experiences, she turned to fiction and is the author of eight best-sellers.

== Publications ==
=== Fiction ===
- Ciel de nuit, 1983 ((en) Night Sky (1983)
- Red Crystal (1985)
- Wolf Winter (1987)
- Requiem (1989)
- The Killing Winds (1992)
- Deceit (1993)
- Liaison fatale, 2022 ((en) Betrayal (1995)
- La maison de l'écluse, 2001 ((en) A Dark Devotion (1997)
- Keep Me Close (1999)
- A Death Divided (2001)
- Homeland (2003)
- Unforgotten (2008)

=== Short stories ===
- "The Holiday" (2005), published in The Detection Collection, edited by Simon Brett.

=== Non-fiction ===
- Woman Alone (1977)
- Victoire océane – Une femme, une transat, un record , 1992 ((en) Come Hell Or High Water / Come Wind Or Weather (1979)
- The Commanding Sea (1981)

=== As editor ===
- A Feast of Stories (1996 anthology; co-edited)
