= Swan 65 =

Finnish fibreglass sailing yacht

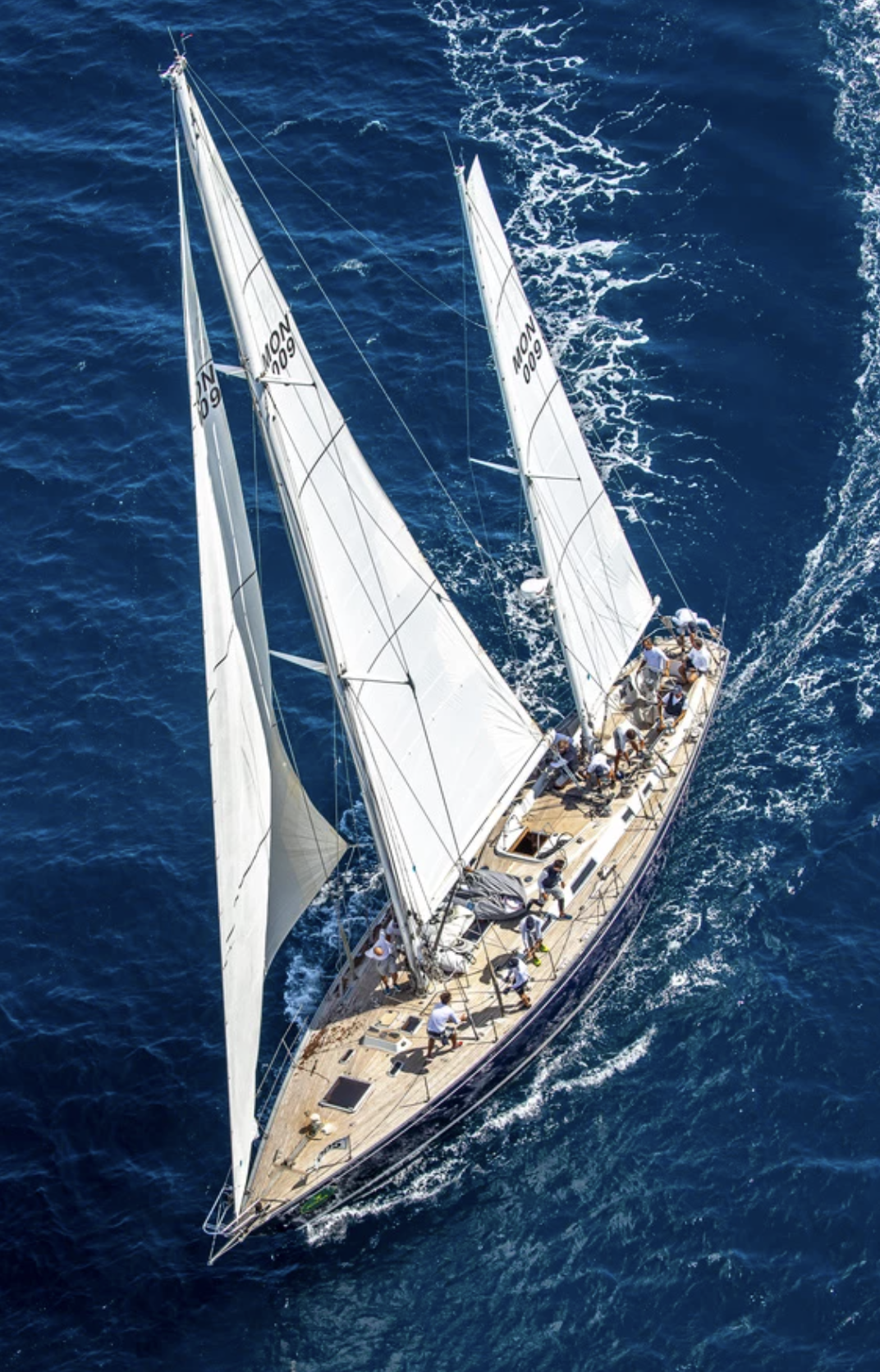
- Swan 65 - 009 (1974)

Development
- Designer: Sparkman & Stephens
- Year: 1971–1989
- No. built: 41
- Brand: Swan
- Builder: OY Nautor AB

Boat
- Displacement: 31,800 kg (70,100 lb)
- Draft: 2.9 m (9.5 ft)
- Air draft: 80 ft 0 in (24.38 m)

Hull
- Type: Monohull
- Construction: GRP
- LOH: 19.68 m (64.6 ft)
- LWL: 14.334 m (47.03 ft)
- Beam: 4.98 m (16.3 ft)
- Engine: Volvo Penta MD32 89 hp Perkins H6.354M 115 hp TMD41A, 148 hp

Hull appendages
- Ballast: 10,400 kg (22,900 lb) - 13,900 kg (30,600 lb)

Rig
- Rig type: Sloop or Ketch
- I foretriangle height: 24.38 m (80.0 ft) Sloop; 22.83 m (74.9 ft) Ketch
- J foretriangle base: 7.73 m (25.4 ft) Sloop; 7.38 m (24.2 ft) Ketch
- P mainsail luff: 22.25 m (73.0 ft) Sloop; 20.64 m (67.7 ft) Ketch
- E mainsail foot: 7.01 m (23.0 ft) Sloop; 5.58 m (18.3 ft) Ketch
- Rig other: 13.73 m (45.0 ft) Mizzen P 3.68 m (12.1 ft) Mizzen E

Sails
- Mainsail area: 839.5 sq ft (77.99 m^{2})
- Spinnaker area: 3,652 sq ft (339.3 m^{2})

The Swan 65 is a large fibreglass fin+keeled masthead ketch- or sloop-rigged sailing yacht design, manufactured by Nautor's Swan. It was introduced as the new flagship of Nautor in 1973. At the time of its launch it was the largest glass reinforced plastic (GRP) constructed yacht in the market and because of its excellent racing history, one of the most famous Swan models ever built. The first 65-footers were delivered to owners in 1973, and the production continued until 1989 with 41 hulls built in total.

The yacht was designed by Sparkman & Stephens which was considered by many, the number one yacht design company at the time. Swan 65 was designed to I.O.R Mk III to fulfil the continuously increasing demand for bigger sailing/racing yachts in the market. In order to meet this demand Nautor had asked Olin Stephens to design a beautiful, fast and safe sailing yacht to continue the development of Swan range. Stephens combined the requested characteristics in a fibreglass hull together with a luxurious interior and technical features that were then typical for successful racing boats.

Its main dimensions are: length overall (LOA) 19.9 m (65 ft), length of waterline (LWL) 14.33 m (47.0 ft), beam 4.98 m (16.3 ft). Up until the hull #019, the displacement was 31,800 kg (70,100 lb) of which 10,400 kg (22,900 lb) was ballast. From the hull #020 onwards the ballast was increased to 13,900 kg (30,600 lb) resulting in a displacement of 35,300 kg (77,800 lb). Therefore, for the first 19 hulls the ballast to weight ratio was 31% which was then increased to 39% for the rest of the production. Although it replaced Swan 55 as the flagship of Nautor, the yacht has no actual predecessor in the Nautors own range and according to the designers comments the design is based on a successful American aluminium yacht Dora IV.

A new Swan 65 was introduced in 2018 under the same name. It is commonly called the Swan 65 Frers to differentiate it from the earlier design.

== Racing success ==
After the breakthrough in 1968 Cowes Week, Swans continued to score victories in the early seventies by winning several famous races including the Bermuda Race in 1972 and 1992 by Swan 48 and especially in 1973–1974, when a brand new ketch rigged Swan 65 by the name Sayula II won the first ever Whitbread Round the World Race (known as The Ocean Race since 2019) skippered by Ramón Carlín. It took 133 days and 13 hours for Sayula II to sail the full race distance of 32,500 nautical miles. In 2016, this adventure was presented in a documentary film called The Weekend Sailor.

The success of Swan 65 in the Whitbread Round the World Race didn't end there as in the next Whitbread Round the World Race in 1977–1978 “Swan 65” scored 2nd, 4th (Disque d’Or), and 5th positions. This time the best result was presented by a sloop called King's Legend (121 days and 11 hours) skippered by Nick Ratcliffe and Skip Novak as the navigator, which finished in second place getting narrowly defeated by Conny van Rietschotens Flyer which was a 65 ft S & S designed purpose built racing yacht manufactured by Royal Huisman. In the same year Clare Francis the first female skipper to compete in the race, finished fifth in her Swan65 ADC Accutrac (126 days 20 hours). In 1981–1982 edition of the race Swan 65 made one final appearance at the top end of the round the world race scoreboard with Xargo III finishing sixth and this time beating a boat called Alaska Eagle (originally Flyer). Therefore, the accumulated score of Swan 65 in three different editions of Whitbread Around the World Race was positions 1st, 2nd, 4th, 5th and 6th.

Later on Swan 65 also won a number of less famous trans ocean races such as the Parmelia Yacht Race in 1979 when Independent Endeavour Skippered by Skip Novak took the line honours and the overall win. This racing success combined with the earlier achievements of Swan 36 significantly increased the Swan brand awareness around the world and secured its place as a successful Finnish industrial product. The legacy of Swan 65 was continued in 1982 by its German Frers designed successor Swan 651 which finished third (Fazer Finland) in 1985–86 Whitbread Round the World Race.

== Spars and rigging ==
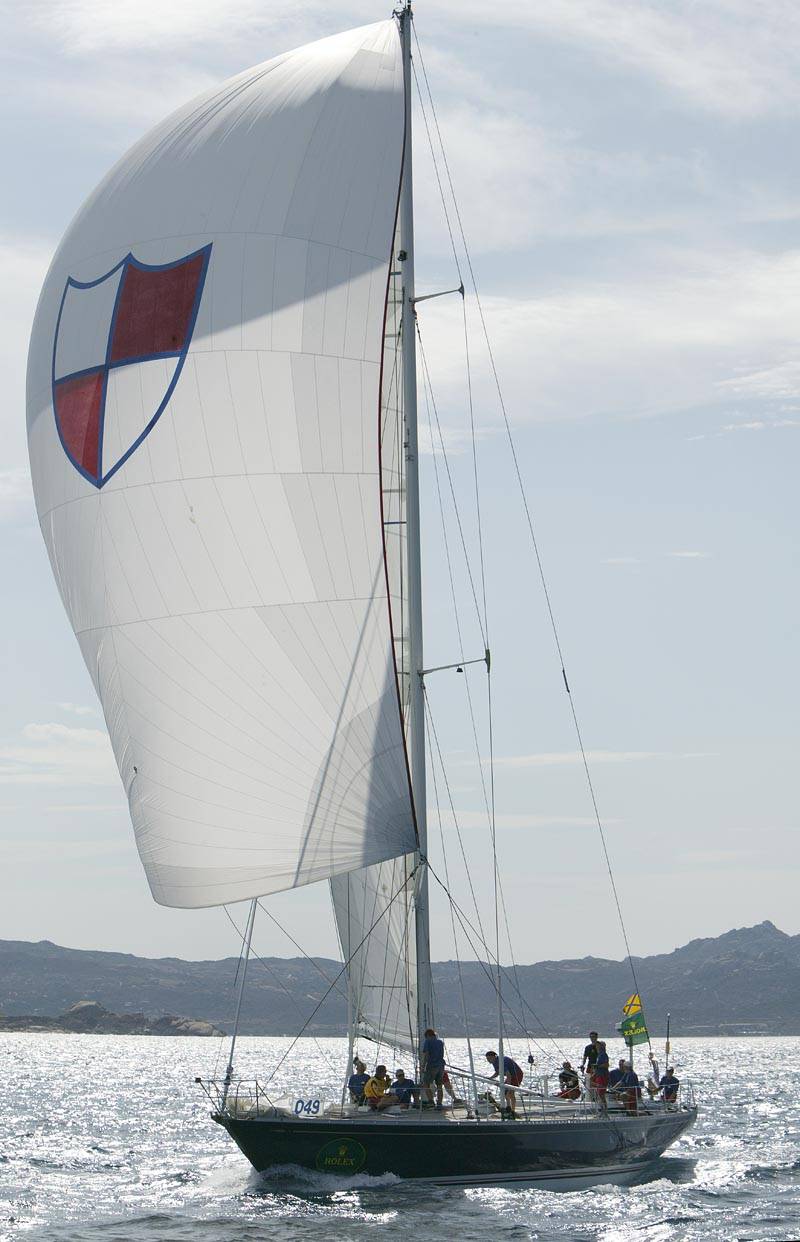
Swan 65 Sloop King's Legend

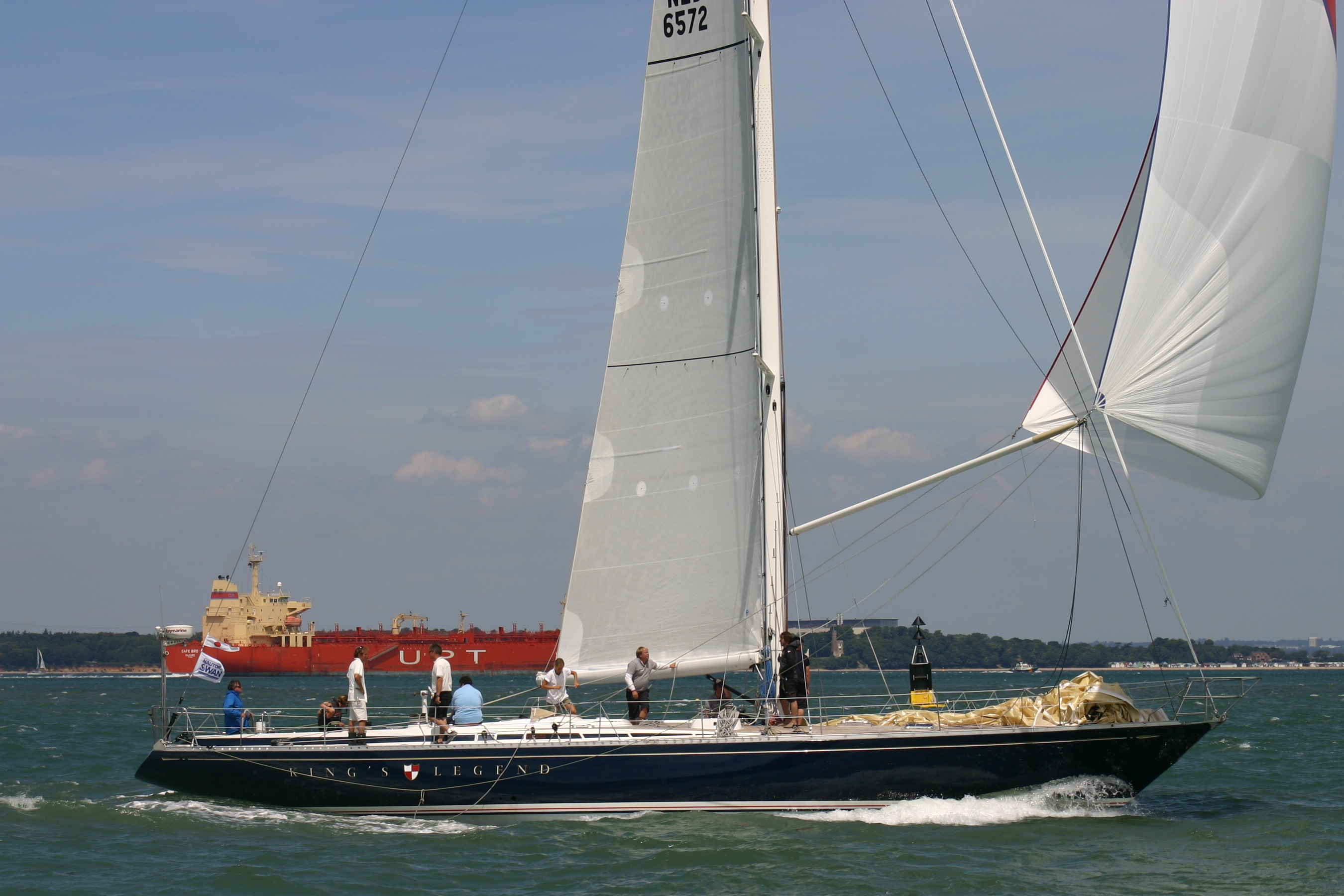
Swan 65 Sloop King's Legend NED6572 at the 2011 Swan Europeans in Cowes (GBR) held by the Royal Yacht Squadron

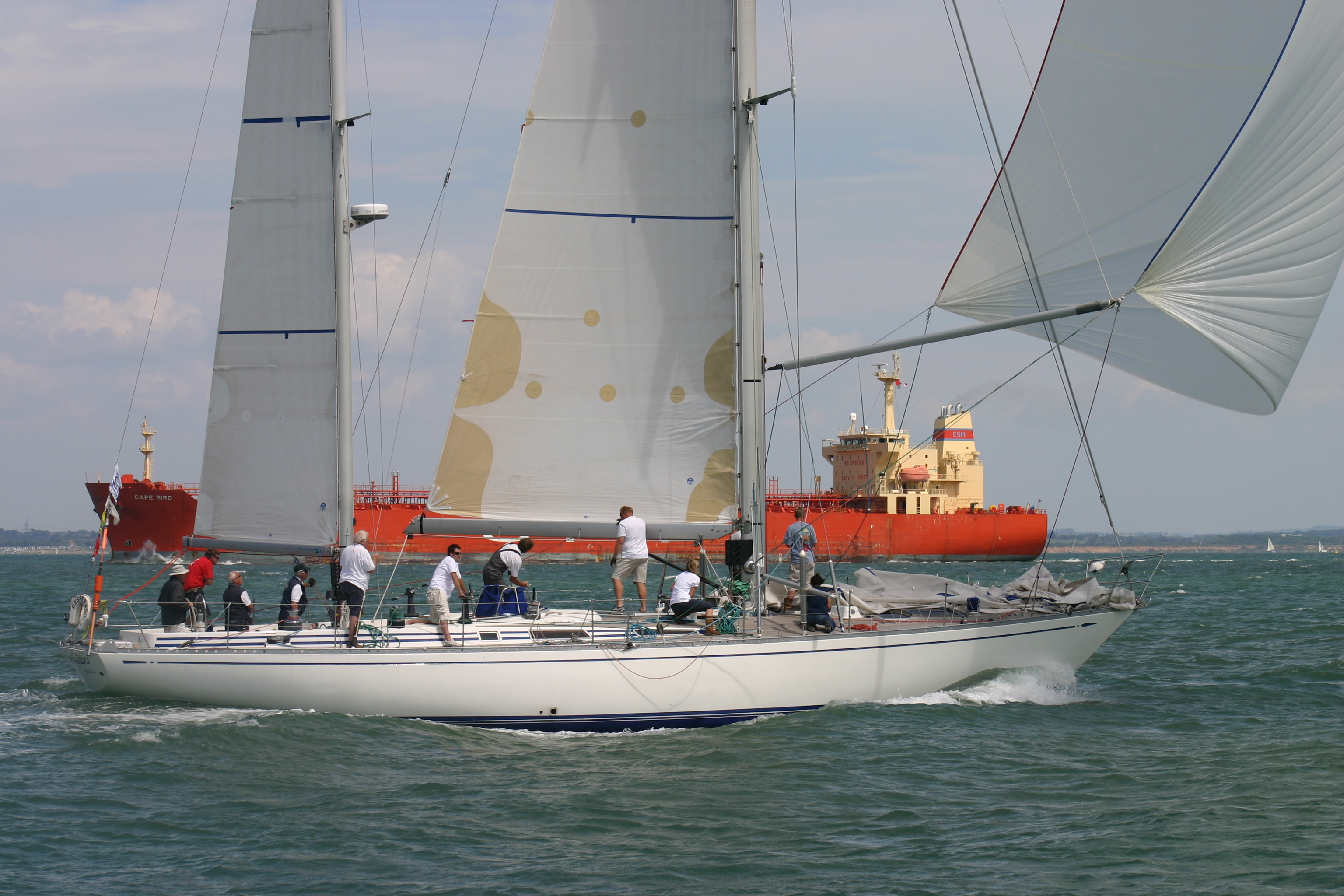
Swan 65-024 ketch - GBR 1665 - Desperado at the 2011 Swan Europeans in Cowes (GBR) held by the Royal Yacht Squadron

Ketch or sloop rig with aluminum spars and stainless steel standing and running rigging. Main (24m) mast has double aluminum in line spreaders and mizzen mast is with single spreaders. Standing rig with stainless steel wire rope with Norseman swageless terminals and consists of headstay, main backstay, the mizzen forward support is done using intermediate shrouds or a triatic stay, mizzen backstay, single upper shrouds and double lowers on main, single uppers and lowers on mizzen. Main, mizzen and spinnaker booms are aluminum. The original winches were manufactured by Lewmar and Barlow. Swan 65 has two spinnaker poles because gybeing large spinnakers by dipping the pole is considered too dangerous. With only one spinnaker pole operational ADC Accutrac performed gybes by lowering the spinnaker, repacking it and hoisting it up again on the other side. (Clare Francis 1978)

== Construction and main equipment ==
Molded polyester fiberglass hull with no core. Hull is hand laid woven rowing, mat and fiberglass cloth. Deck and deckhouse are foam cored sandwich structure between layers of glass and polyester resin. Additional reinforcement is provided through the use of fiberglass stiffeners. All construction was made according to Lloyd's Register. Because the boat was in production for such a long time the type of engine had to be changed three times. The first hulls were equipped with a Volvo MD32 engine which was soon changed to Perkins H6.354M. This type was used until the production of the engine was discontinued and the engine was changed back to Volvo but this time type was TMD41A. Much of the deck gear, blocks and fittings were manufactured in-house by Nautor simply because most of the parts available in the market were designed for much smaller boats and there were very little deck gear and other equipment available for a boat of this size.

== Accommodation ==
The Swan 65 sleeps 12 in four cabin spaces - two in forecastle in pipe cots, four in two forward cabins in pilot berths, three in main cabin in pilot berths and convertible settee, and three in a single and a double berth in the aft cabin. The saloon is roomy and not as dark as the narrow coach roof windows might suggest. Below the decks the sixty five offers very good combination of ocean going practicality and comfort as the berths are relatively small and secure, but the galley and chart table areas as well as the dining area are large, well equipped and very practical. A cut out in the bulkhead allows passing items and communication between the galley and the U- Shaped dining area. On some sixty fives this bulkhead is solid while on others it's completely open with just a pillar running from the lower part of the bulkhead to the deck head. Forward of the saloon are two matching guest cabins with upper and lower single berths parallel to the centerline. Two forward heads with WC lavatory and shower. The owners stateroom in the aft is very spacious, having a double and a single berth, dressing table, cupboards and wardrobes and with WC lavatory and shower. The U-Shaped galley is large, well ventilated and equipped with double stainless steel sink, pressure water system, water heater, top opening refrigerator and deep freeze range/oven and ample storage areas. Throughout the history of Nautor the yard has provided their customers with a chance to choose the interior materials and lay-out to suit their liking which is why some of the interior arrangements deviate from the standard. Some yachts like Sayula II has even a small workshop fitted inside the boat to make repairs at sea easier.

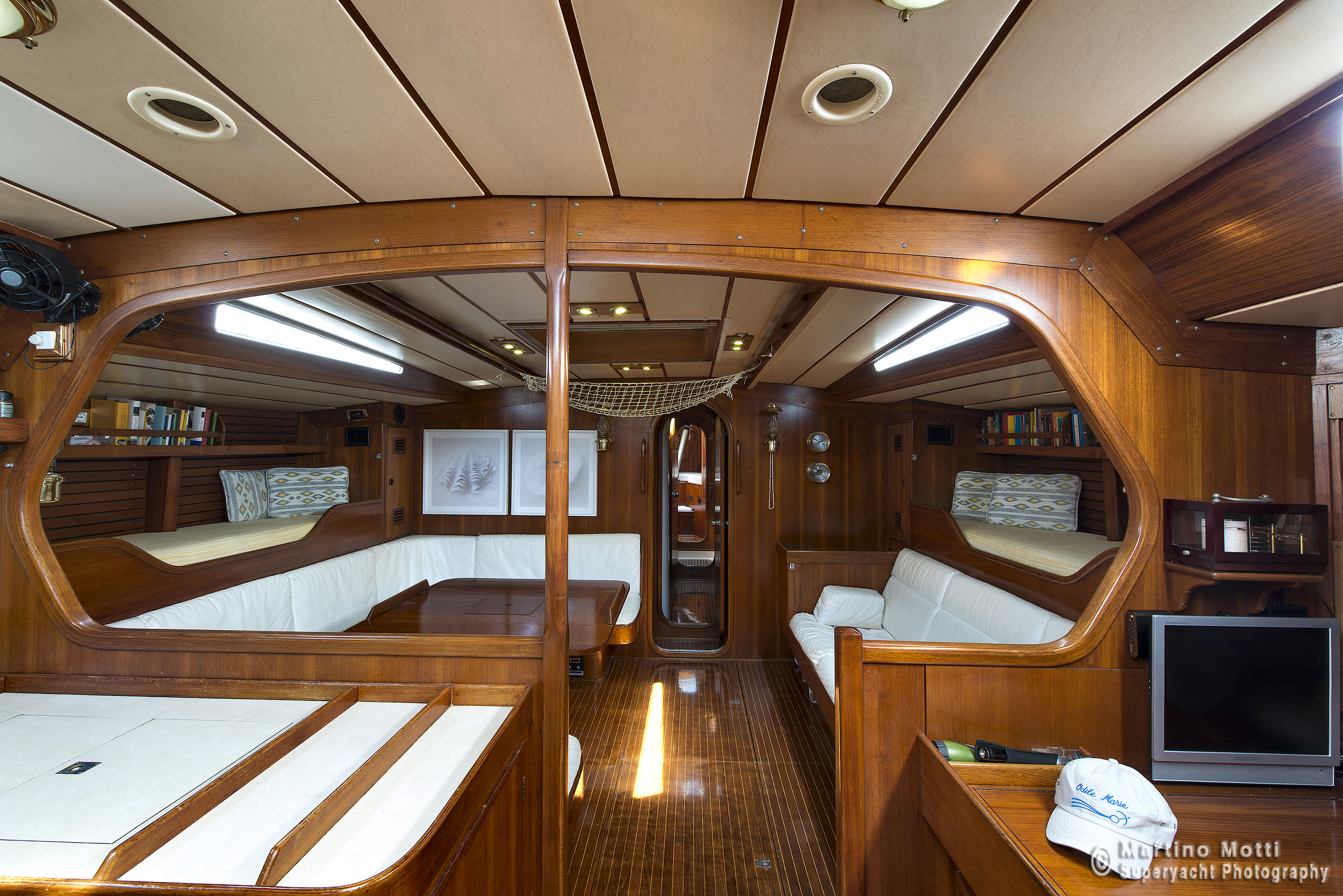
Swan 65 Odile Marie Saloon

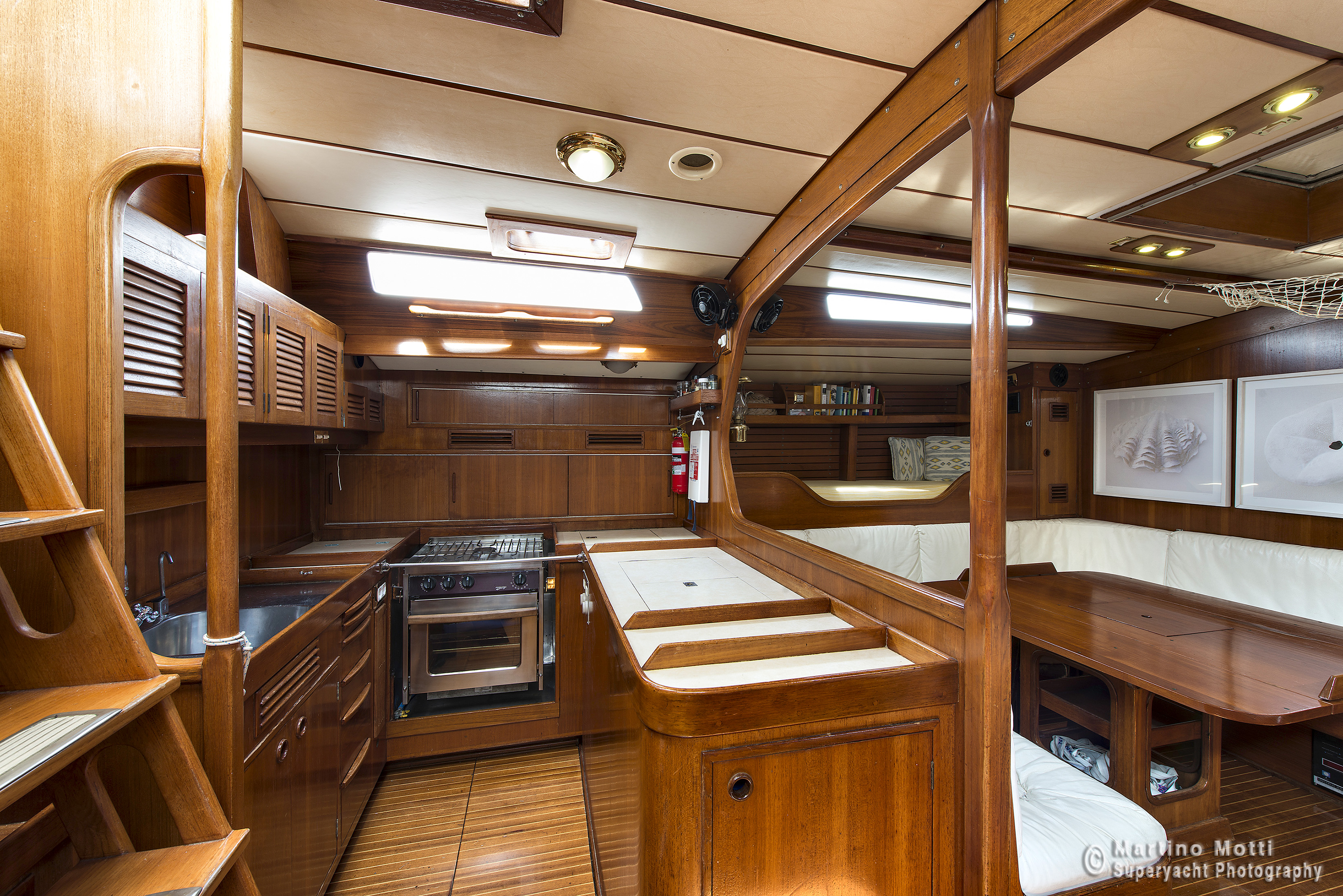
Swan 65 Odile Marie Pentry

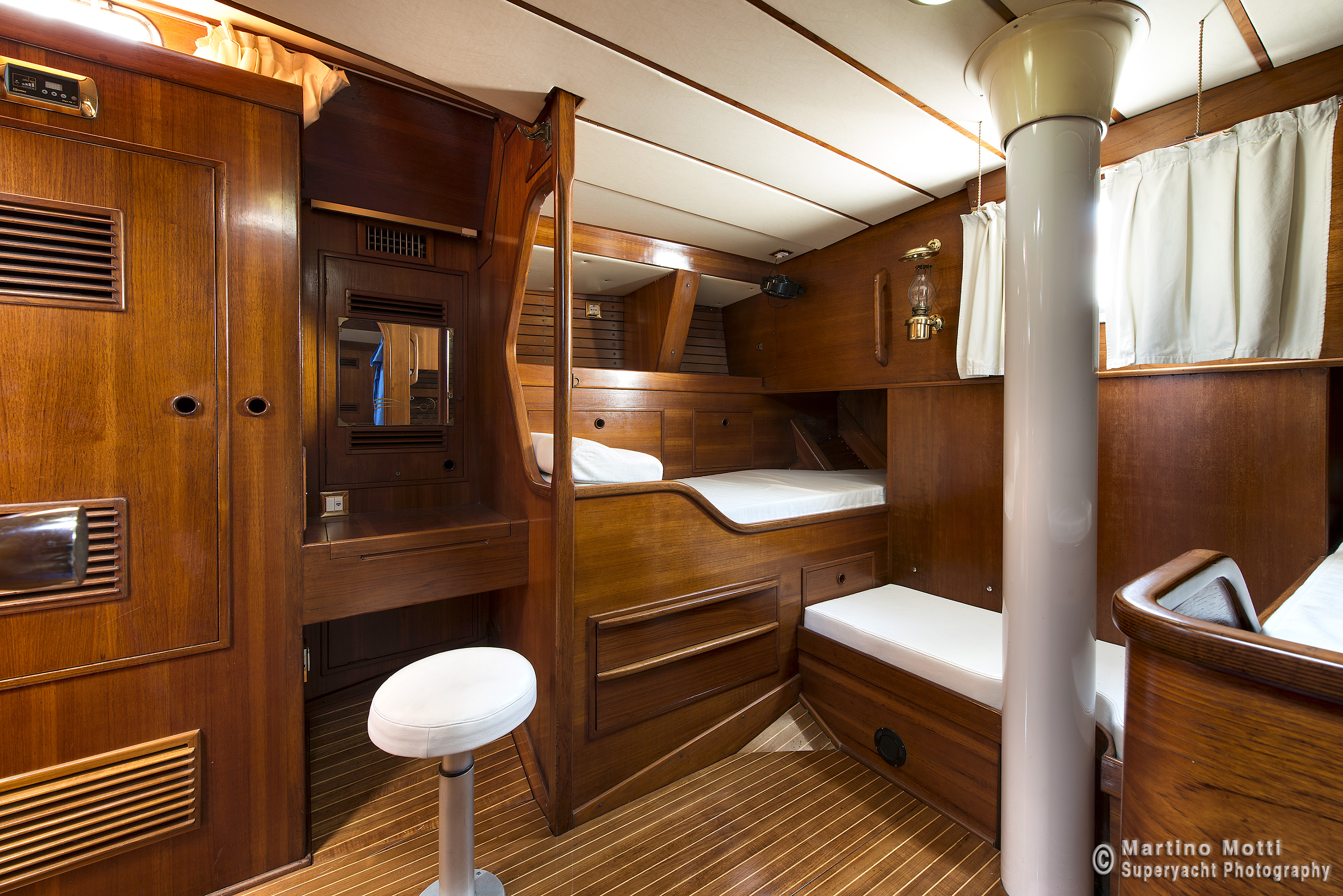
Swan 65 Odile Marie aft cabin

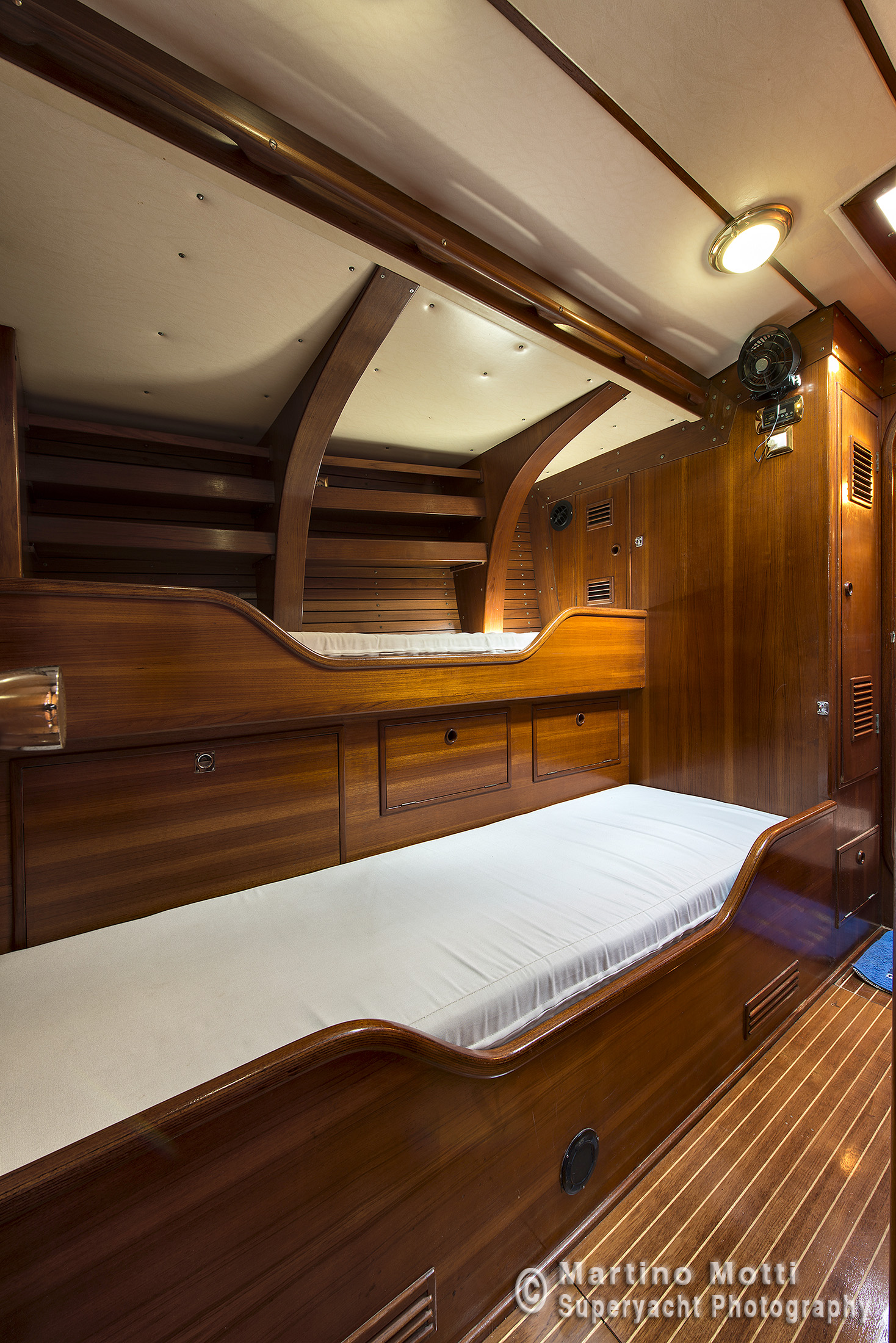
Swan 65 Odile Marie port cabin

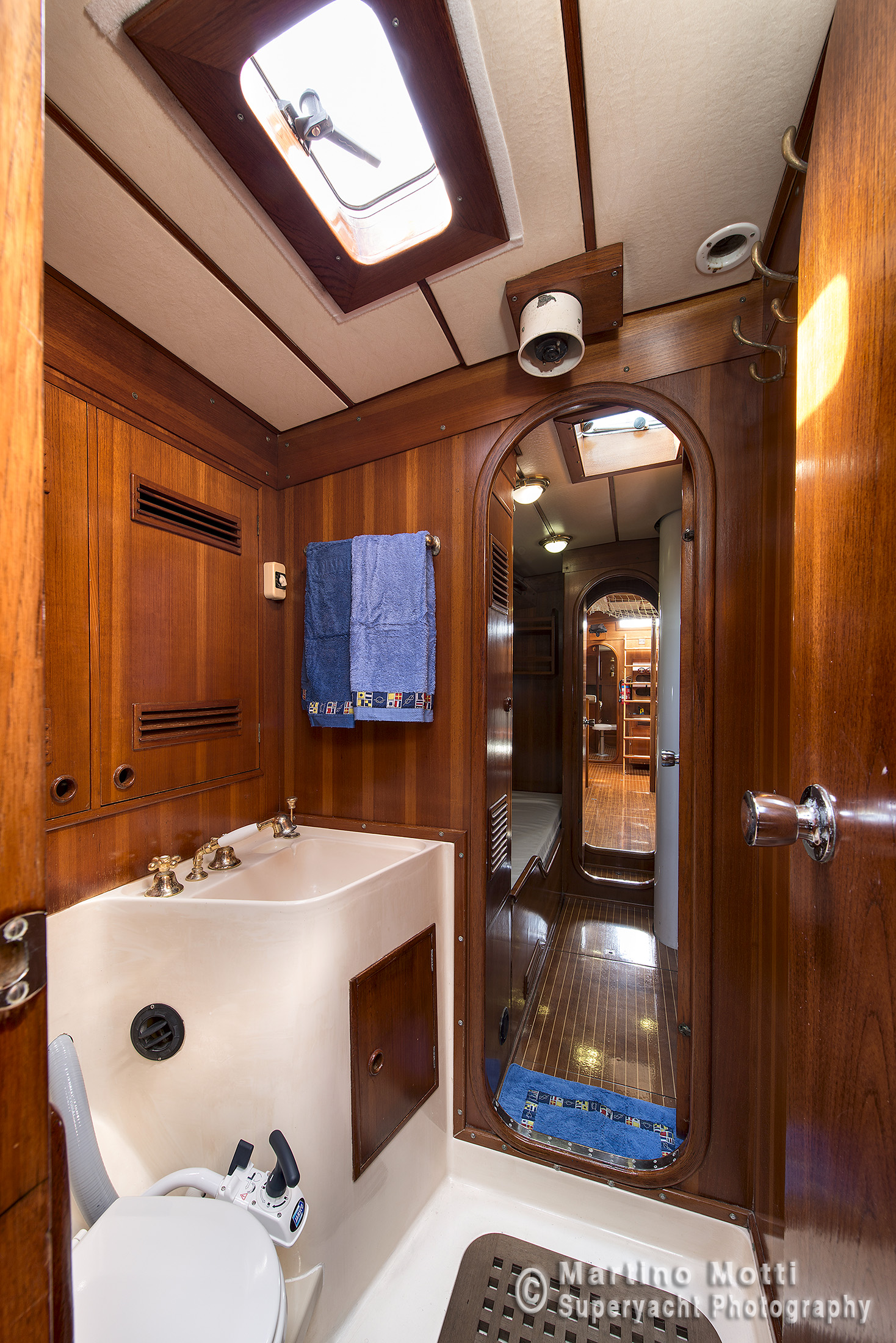
Odile Marie front head

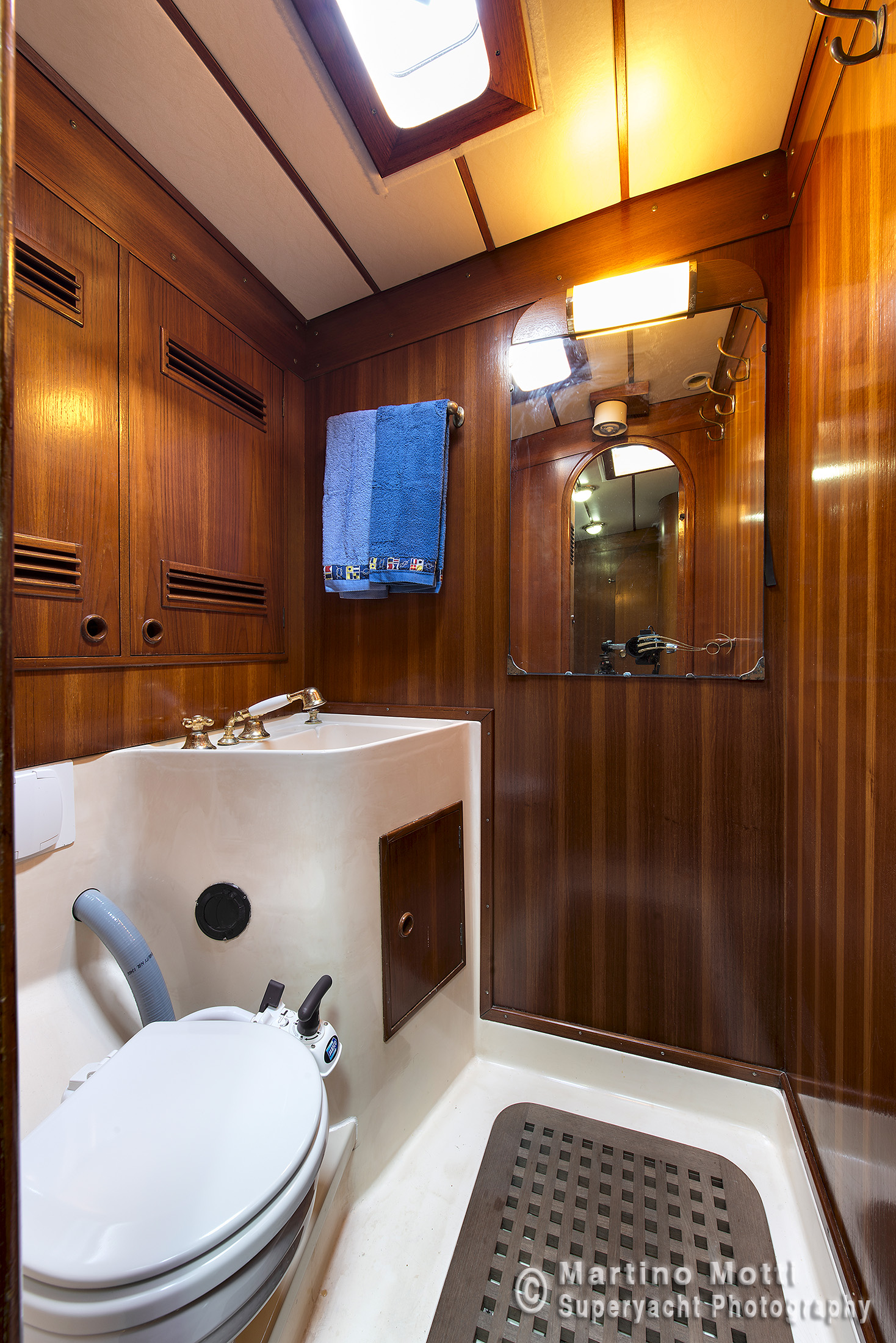
Odile Marie aft head

== Literature ==
- Clare Francis, Come Wind or Weather: ADC Accutrac Races Round the World, Pelham Books, London, 1978, ISBN 978-072-07-1104-2
- Cornelis Van Rietschoten, Barry Pickthall, Flyer: The Quest to Win the Round the World Race, W W Norton & Co Inc, 1980, ISBN 978-039-30-3248-2

== More information ==
- "The Weekend Sailor". theweekendsailor.com.
- Whitbread History, Krister.tv
- "Sparkman & Stephens: Design 2110 - Swan 65". sparkmanstephens.blogspot.fi.
- "Sailing Legends Monolingual by PPL Limited - issuu". Issuu. issuu.com.

== Videos ==
- "The Weekend Sailor teaser 2016 - YouTube". youtube.com. 25 December 2015.
- "A history of Nautor's Swan - YouTube". youtube.com. 30 March 2015.
- "The 1973-74 Whitbread Film Remastered | Volvo Ocean Race - YouTube". youtube.com.
- "Official Film: The Whitbread 1977-78 | Volvo Ocean Race Legends - YouTube". youtube.com.
