= Royal Huisman =

Dutch shipyard that builds and repairs sailing yachts

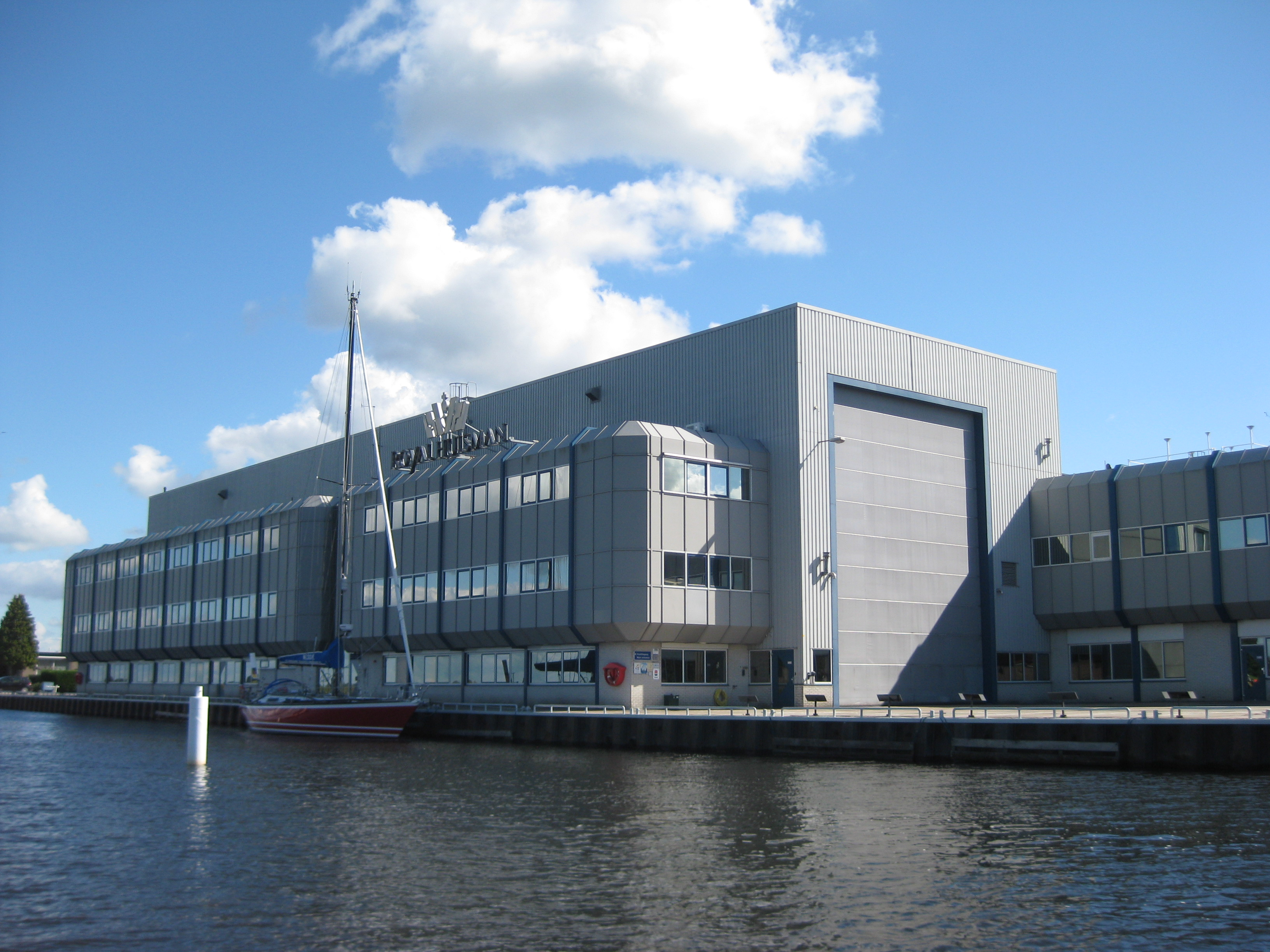
- Industry: Shipbuilding
- Founded: 1884; 142 years ago
- Headquarters: Vollenhove, The Netherlands
- Products: Yachts

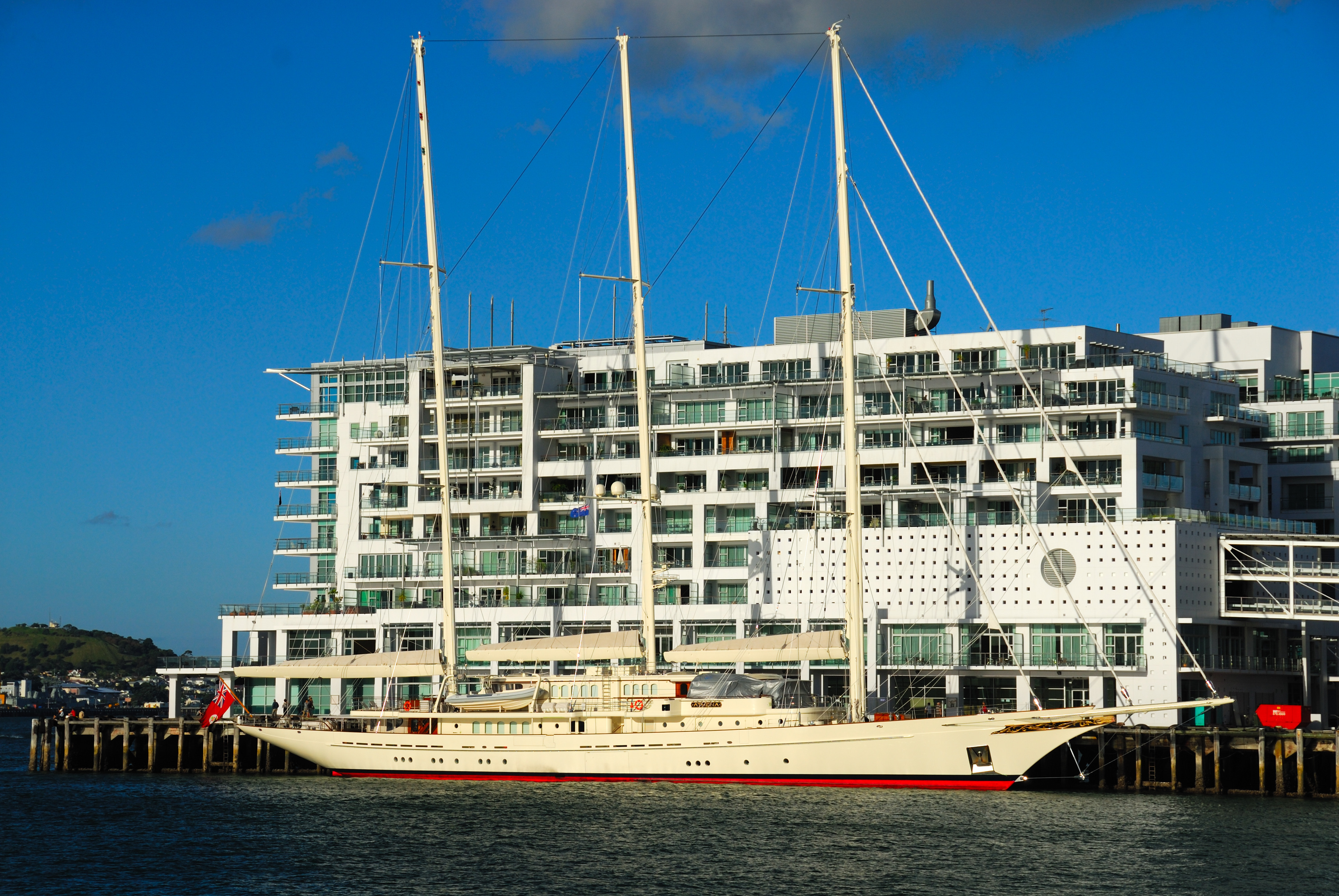

Royal Huisman is a Dutch shipbuilding company that specializes in the newbuild construction of sailing and (occasionally) unique motor yachts. "Huisfit by Royal Huisman" and "Rondal" are also part of the shipyard's group.

== History ==
The shipyard was established in 1884 in Ronduite as a builder of wooden workboats and fishing boats for the local, inland sea, the "Zuiderzee". In 1954 Jan Huisman specialised in steel sailing yachts, and his son Wolter transitioned to aluminium hulls in 1964 with the 30 ft Van de Stadt Avenir series. In the 1970s the development of extruded aluminum masts and cooperation with New York designers Sparkman & Stephens (S&S) enabled Huisman to tap into performance yachts and the international racing circuit: The shipyard launched its largest yacht to date, the prize-winning 60 ft S&S sloop Running Tide, at its new deep-water premises in Vollenhove in 1970. In 1973 Huisman built Albert Henri Karl Büll's first Saudade, the 47 ft S&S sloop which won the Admiral's Cup for Germany in the same year. In 1976, the shipyard built Conny van Rietschoten's 65 ft S&S ketch Flyer for the 1977–78 Whitbread Round the World Race, which she won. Their success was repeated in the 1981–82 Whitbread race with van Rietschoten's new 76 ft Frers-designed sloop Flyer II which took line honours in all four legs. Winning this race twice (now known as The Ocean Race) is a feat that has not been matched since.

In turn the shipyard developed successfully in Maxi yachts and large cruising yachts with designers Germán Frers and Ron Holland. Upon its hundredth anniversary in 1984 the shipyard was awarded a royal charter by Queen Beatrix and changed its name to Royal Huisman. In 1989 the shipyard set a new trend of large classic yacht revival by cooperating with designer Gerard Dijkstra to restore Elizabeth Meyer's prestigious 1934 J-class yacht Endeavour. The restoration as well as a number of Royal Huisman's subsequent projects received industry awards from yacht owners and the press. The shipyard launched the 112 ft sloop Pamina (nowadays Sassafras), the world's first yacht built from the high temper aluminium alloy Alustar, in the year 2000. The shipyard's flagship Athena was handed over in 2004 to repeat client, Dr. Jim Clark, who also ordered Hyperion (1998).

The shipyard had been taking care of superyacht refits occasionally during previous years when it broadened its business model with the official expansion of superyacht refit and repair in 2011. Huisfit, the new name for the services of this division was introduced. The Huisfit team has been taking care of various non-Royal Huisman yachts too. In 2014 Royal Huisman became a co-owner of the Bucket Regattas, and in the same year the shipyard affiliated with Royal Doeksen, another Dutch maritime service organisation owned and run by the fourth generation of the same family.

Construction takes place in a 30,000m² purpose-built facility with five building halls as well as various specialists manufacturing halls by a team of over 350 specialists along with various partners / co-makers. A selection are operated by the team of Rondal, a sister company of Royal Huisman specialized in rigs, winches, and carbonfiber sailing and motoryacht components. The shipyard facilities are extended to the Amsterdam region at the 12,000m premises of the former Holland Jachtbouw in 2019. This second location for Royal Huisman serves as an addition to the existing headquarters in Vollenhove, with focus on the superyacht refits, conversions and rebuilds of the worldwide superyacht fleet. The Dutch long-term investor O2 Capital Partners is the new owner of the Royal Huisman group since 2024.

== List of yachts built ==
Below is a list of all the yachts built by Royal Huisman:

== See also ==
- List of large sailing yachts
- Feadship - another Dutch shipyard with a royal charter
- Royal IHC - another Dutch shipyard with a royal charter
- Royal Bodewes - another Dutch shipyard with a royal charter
