= Frers =

Frers is a surname. Notable people with the surname include:

- Delfina Frers (born 1960), Argentine racing driver
- Germán Frers (sailor) (1899–1986), Argentine sailor
- Germán Frers (born 1941), Argentinian naval architect
- Greg Frers (born 1971), Canadian football player
