= Flyer (yacht) =

Racing yacht

- Nation: Netherlands; United States
- Launched: 1977

Racing career
- Skippers: Conny van Rietschoten
- Notable victories: 1977–78 Whitbread

Flyer (also known as Alaska Eagle 1981–2013) is a 20-metre (65 ft) one-off aluminium ocean racing ketch designed by Sparkman & Stephens and built by Jachtwerf W. Huisman. She won the 1977–78 Whitbread Round the World Race skippered by Conny van Rietschoten.

== 1977–78 Flyer crew ==
- Conny van Rietschoten – Skipper
- Gerard (Gerry) Dijkstra – Navigator/Watchleader
- Aedgard Koekebakker – Watchleader
- John Anderson
- Bruce Ashwood
- Bert Dykema – Doctor
- Adrian Ford – Sailmaker
- Billy Johnson
- Marcel Laurin – Cook
- Chris Moselen
- Ari Steinberg
- Rod White
- Hugh Wilson – Shipwright
