= The Ocean Race =

Yacht race around the world

- Formerly: Whitbread Round the World Race (1973–2001); Volvo Ocean Race (2001–2019)
- Sponsor: Volvo
- Partner: Inmarsat
- First held: 1973; 53 years ago
- Yachts used: Volvo Ocean 65; IMOCA 60 (Since 2021)
- Start: 2023 Alicante, Spain
- Finish: 2023 Genoa, Italy
- Competitors: 7
- Legs: 10
- Champion: 2023 11th Hour Racing Team (IMOCA 60); 2023 WindWhisper Racing Team (Volvo Ocean 65)
- Website: www.theoceanrace.com

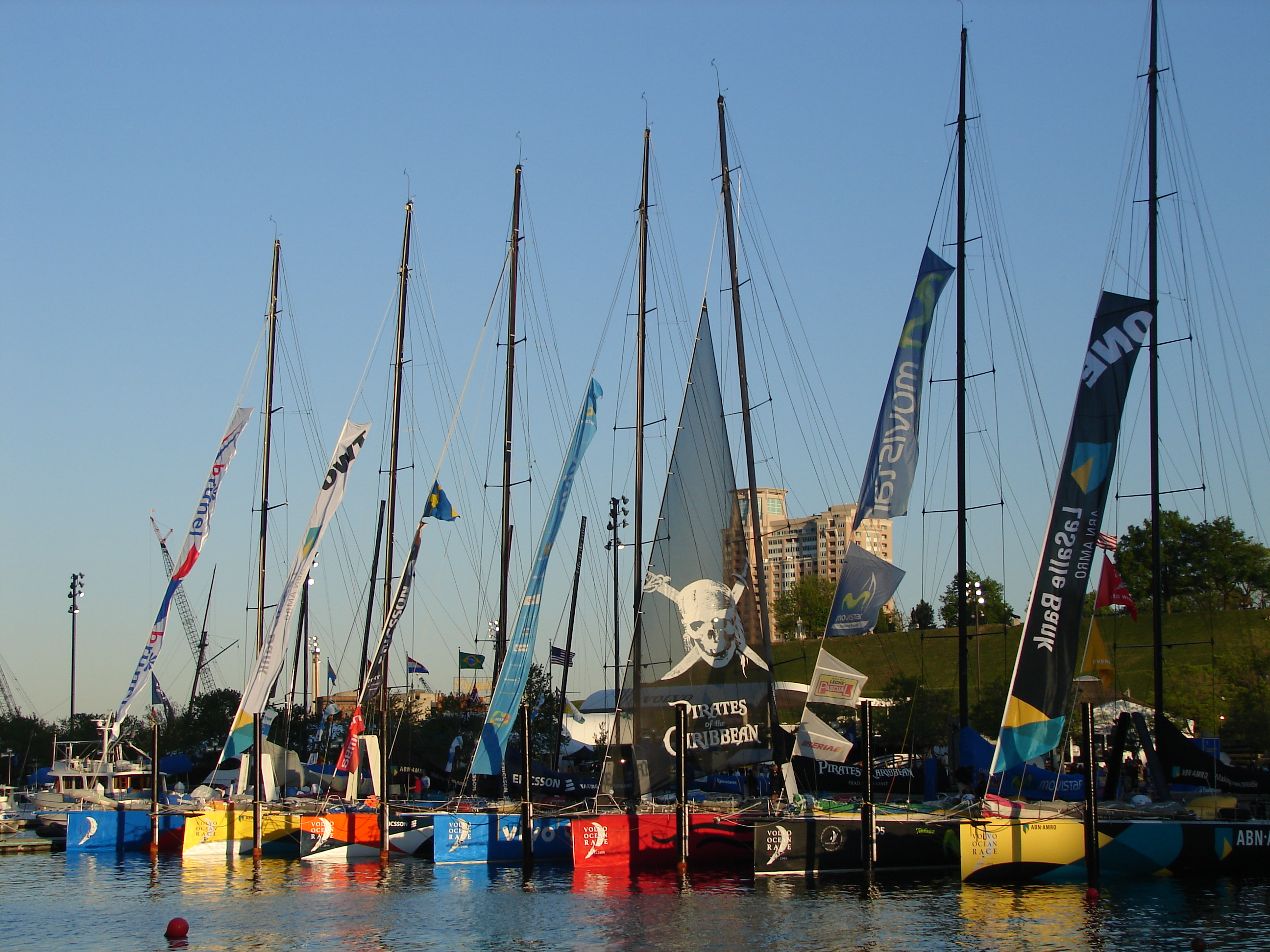
Race participants in Baltimore Inner Harbor, 2006

The Ocean Race is a yacht race around the world, held every three or four years since 1973. Originally named the Whitbread Round the World Race after its initiating sponsor, British brewing company Whitbread, in 2001 it became the Volvo Ocean Race after Swedish automobile manufacturer Volvo took up the sponsorship, and in 2019 it was renamed The Ocean Race.

Each of the entries has a sailing crew who race day and night for more than 20 days at a time on some of the legs. Since the 2008–2009 race there has also been a dedicated media crew member called the On Board Reporter (OBR), who does not contribute to the sailing of the boat, but is responsible for sending images and video to race headquarters via satellite from the middle of the ocean. In the 2017–2018 race, the number of crew ranged between 7 and 10 (plus the OBR) depending on the gender ratio, with the rules providing an incentive to having women sailors on board.

To minimize weight, crews overwhelmingly rely on freeze-dried fare for sustenance. Crews are also subjected to temperature variations from −5 to +40 degrees Celsius and will often take only one change of clothes.

== History ==
In 1972 England's Whitbread company and the British Royal Naval Sailing Association agreed to sponsor a globe-circling regatta, which would be called the 'Whitbread Round the World Yacht Race'.

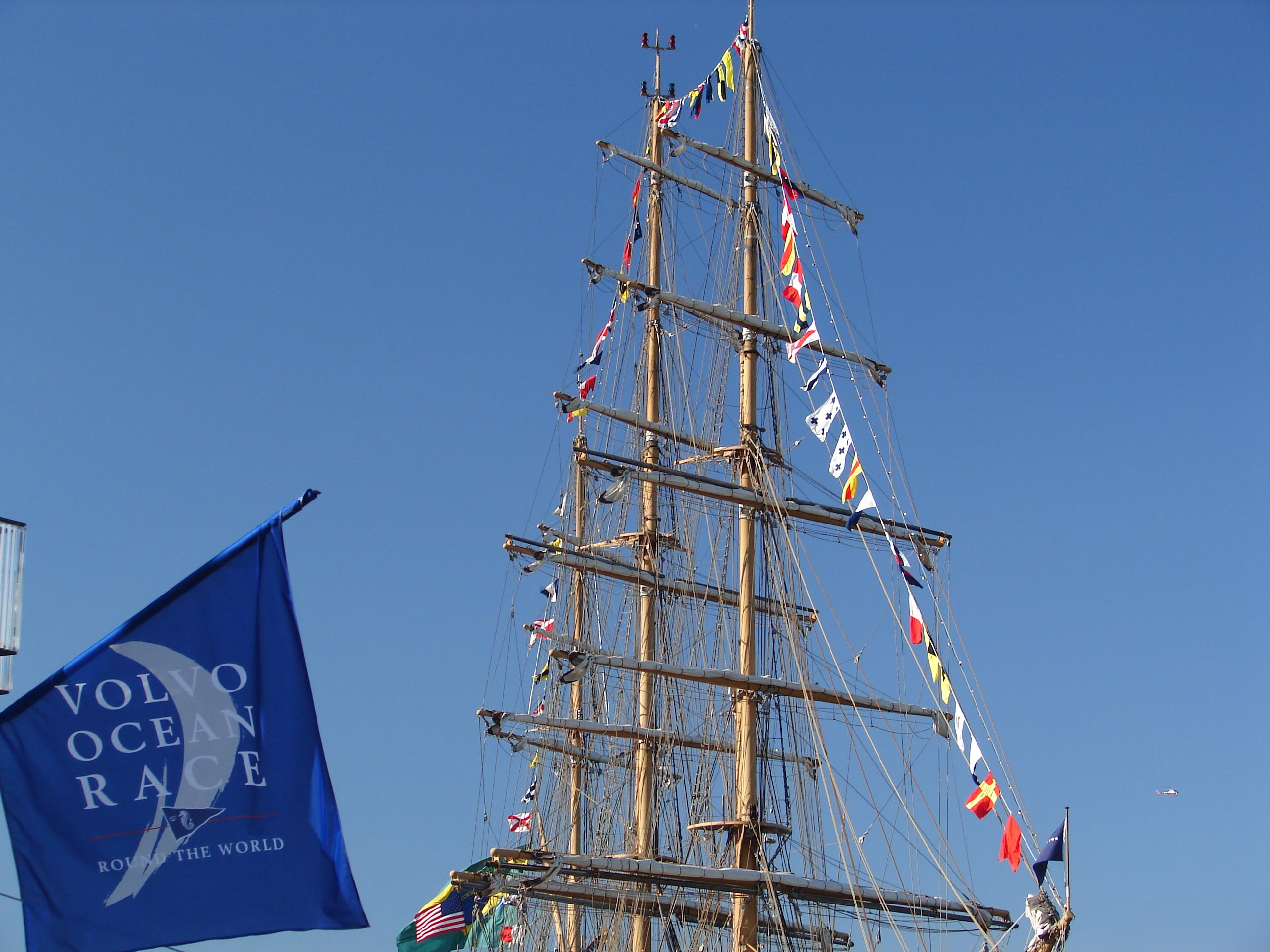
Volvo Ocean Race flag in Baltimore Inner Harbor, United States

Seventeen yachts and 167 crew started the first race of 27,500 nmi (50,900 km), which began from Portsmouth, United Kingdom, on 8 September 1973. Approximately 3000 spectator boats set out to witness the historic start. The first race was won by Mexican amateur Ramón Carlín in a Swan 65 yacht, Sayula II. Sayula II was followed by Adventure, Grand Louis and Kriter.

The original course was designed to follow the route of the square riggers, which had carried cargo around the world during the 19th Century.

From 2001 the ownership of the race was taken over by Volvo and Volvo Cars and the race was renamed the 'Volvo Ocean Race'. Stopover ports were added in Germany, France, and Sweden being Volvo's three biggest car markets in Europe.

Winning the race does not attract a cash prize, as the feat of competing is presented as sufficient reward.

Many of the crew in the Volvo Ocean Race race crew other professional teams in other high-profile events, such as the Olympic Games, Sydney to Hobart Yacht Race, the America's Cup, or the Fastnet Race.

The worst weather conditions are usually encountered in the Southern Ocean where waves sometimes top 150 feet (46 m) and winds can reach 70 knots (130 km/h).

The 2017–18 race covered 45,000 nautical miles, which is the longest route in its history.

== The yachts ==
Early races had a very wide range of boat types, but concerns after the 1989–1990 race led to the development of the Whitbread 60 single design. This was a reaction to increasing costs of the biggest, "maxi", boats, and their advantage over the rest of the field – Steinlager 2 won every leg in the maxi division and was the winner overall, with many of the smaller boats finishing legs more than ten days after the winner.

The Whitbread 60 design was used for all smaller boats in the 1993–1994 race, and for all in the 1997–1998 race. The race continued to be restricted to a single class for the next seven races – but moved to the Volvo Open 70, then the Volvo Ocean 65.

Two classes of boats were used for the 2023 edition of the race: the Volvo Ocean 65 and the IMOCA 60.

== The route ==
Though the route changes to accommodate various ports of call, the race typically departs Europe in October, and in recent editions has had either 9 or 10 legs, with in-port races at many of the stopover cities. The 2008–09 race started in Alicante, Spain, on October 11, 2008. The route for the 2008–2009 race was altered from previous years to include stopovers in India and Asia for the first time. The 2008–09 route covered nearly 39,000 nmi (72,000 km), took over nine months to complete, and reached a cumulative TV audience of 2 billion people worldwide.

During the nine months of the 2011–12 Volvo Ocean Race, which started in Alicante, Spain, in October 2011 and concluded in Galway, Ireland, in July 2012, the teams were scheduled to sail over 39,000 nmi (72,000 km) of the world's most treacherous seas via Cape Town, Abu Dhabi, Sanya, Auckland, around Cape Horn to Itajaí, Miami, Lisbon, and Lorient.

As in the previous editions, the 2014–15 Volvo Ocean Race started in Alicante, Spain, on October 11. Destination was Gothenburg, Sweden, scheduled for June 2015, with stopovers in the ports of Cape Town, Abu Dhabi, Sanya, Auckland, Itajaí, Newport, Lisbon, Lorient, and with a Pitstop at The Hague through the last leg.

== List of races ==
| Edition | Start | Finish | Class | Legs | In-Port Races | Entries | Winning yacht | Winning skipper |
|---|---|---|---|---|---|---|---|---|
| 1973–74 | (United Kingdom) Portsmouth | (United Kingdom) Portsmouth | 32–80 ft (9.8–24.4 m) | 4 | 0 | 17 | (Mexico) Sayula II | Ramón Carlín (MEX) |
| 1977–78 | (United Kingdom) Portsmouth | (United Kingdom) Portsmouth | 51–77 ft (16–23 m) | 4 | 0 | 15 | (Netherlands) Flyer | Conny van Rietschoten (NED) |
| 1981–82 | (United Kingdom) Portsmouth | (United Kingdom) Portsmouth | 43–80 ft (13–24 m) | 4 | 0 | 29 | (Netherlands) Flyer II | Conny van Rietschoten (NED) |
| 1985–86 | (United Kingdom) Portsmouth | (United Kingdom) Portsmouth | 49–83 ft (15–25 m) | 4 | 0 | 15 | (France) L'esprit d'équipe | Lionel Péan (FRA) |
| 1989–90 | (United Kingdom) Southampton | (United Kingdom) Southampton | 51–84 ft (16–26 m) | 6 | 0 | 23 | (New Zealand) Steinlager 2 | Sir Peter Blake (NZL) |
| 1993–94 | (United Kingdom) Southampton | (United Kingdom) Southampton | 85 ft (26 m) ketchs | 6 | 0 | 5 | (New Zealand) NZ Endeavour | Grant Dalton (NZL) |
| 1993–94 | (United Kingdom) Southampton | (United Kingdom) Southampton | Whitbread 60 | 6 | 0 | 10 | (Japan) Yamaha | Ross Field (NZL) |
| 1997–98 | (United Kingdom) Southampton | (United Kingdom) Southampton | Whitbread 60 | 9 | 0 | 10 | (Sweden) EF Language | Paul Cayard (USA) |
| 2001–02 | (United Kingdom) Southampton | (Germany) Kiel | Whitbread 60 | 9 | 0 | 8 | (Germany) Illbruck Challenge | John Kostecki (USA) |
| 2005–06 | (Spain) Vigo | (Sweden) Gothenburg | Volvo Open 70 | 9 | 7 | 7 | (Netherlands) ABN AMRO I | Mike Sanderson (NZL) |
| 2008–09 | (Spain) Alicante | (Russia) Saint Petersburg | Volvo Open 70 | 10 | 7 | 8 | (Sweden) Ericsson 4 | Torben Grael (BRA) |
| 2011–12 | (Spain) Alicante | (Republic of Ireland) Galway | Volvo Open 70 | 9 | 10 | 6 | (France) Groupama 4 | Franck Cammas (FRA) |
| 2014–15 | (Spain) Alicante | (Sweden) Gothenburg | Volvo Ocean 65 | 9 | 10 | 7 | (United Arab Emirates) Azzam | Ian Walker (GBR) |
| 2017–18 | (Spain) Alicante | (Netherlands) The Hague | Volvo Ocean 65 | 10 | 12 | 7 | (China) Dongfeng Race Team | Charles Caudrelier (FRA) |
| 2023 | (Spain) Alicante | (Italy) Genoa | IMOCA 60 | 7 | 7 | 5 | (United States) 11th Hour Racing Team | Charlie Enright (USA) |
| 2023 | (Spain) Alicante | (Italy) Genoa | Volvo Ocean 65 | 3 | 4 | 6 | (Poland) WindWhisper Racing Team | Pablo Arrarte (ESP); Daryl Wislang (NZL) |
| 2027 | (Spain) Alicante | (Saudi Arabia) Amaala | IMOCA 60 | A 15th edition has been announced with a start in Alicante in early 2027 | | | | |
| 2031 | (Portugal) Porto | | IMOCA 60 | A 16th edition has been announced with a start in early 2031 | | | | |

== Notable records ==
- Netherlands, only country to have three wins
- Conny van Rietschoten, only skipper to win the race twice
- Steinlager 2, only yacht to ever win all six legs

== Horrevoets Trophy ==
In May 2009, The Ocean Race launched the Hans Horrevoets Rookie Award to recognize the outstanding under-30 sailor in each edition of the race as nominated by the respective skippers.

Recipients:

- 2008–09 - Michael "Michi" Mueller - Puma Ocean Racing
- 2011–12 - David "Dave" Swete - Team Sanya
- 2014–15 - Sophie Ciszek - Team SCA
- 2017–18 - Bleddyn Mon - Turn the Tide on Plastic
- 2023–23 - Will Harris - Team Malizia

== See also ==
- List of Volvo Ocean Race sailors
- The Ocean Race Europe
- Ocean Globe Race, a retro race to celebrate the 50th anniversary of the first Whitbread Round the World Race.
