= List of The Ocean Race sailors =

This is a list of sailors who have started in at least one offshore leg of The Ocean Race.

Stu Bannatyne and Bouwe Bekking have both made eight appearances in the race.

== A ==
Sailor	Nationality	Year
Charles Abrahams	Great Britain	1973–74 Adventure
Stefan Abrahamsson	Sweden	1989–90 The Card
W. Abram	Great Britain	1977–78 Heath's Condor
Ed Adams	United States	2001–02 Illbruck Challenge
Maurice Adatto	Switzerland	1985–86 UBS Switzerland, 1989–90 Merit, 1993–94 Merit Cup
Peter Addeson	Rhodesia	1973–74 33 Export
Tom Addeson	Rhodesia	1973–74 33 Export
Tom Addis	Australia	2008–09 Telefónica Blue, 2011–12 Mar Mostro, 2014–15 Team Vestas Wind
Erick Ader	Netherlands	1977–78 Tielsa
Marco Adriani	Italy	1981–82 Save Venice
Richard Adsett	Great Britain	1977–78 Great Britain II
Trevor Agnew	New Zealand	1981–82 Ceramco New Zealand
Rosario Agosti	Italy	1981–82 Vivanapoli
Christian Aguesseau	France	1973–74 Concorde
Gian Ahluwalia	Canada	1989–90 Belmont Finland II
Roddy Ainslie	Great Britain	1973–74 Second Life
Phil Airey	New Zealand	2001–02 Amer Sports One, 2005–06 Brunel
Serguei Akatyev	Soviet Union	1989–90 Fazisi
Espen Aker	Norway	1981–82 Berge Viking, 1985–86 Drum
Pascal Allamand	Switzerland	1985–86 UBS Switzerland
David Alan-Williams	Great Britain	1973–74 Burton Cutter, 1977–78 Heath's Condor, 1981–82 FCF Challenger, 1989–90 Creighton's Naturally
Grahame Aldous	Great Britain	1989–90 Creighton's Naturally
Joshua Alexander	New Zealand	2001–02 Assa Abloy
Stuart Alexander	Great Britain	1989–90 British Satquote Defender
Valeri Alexeev	Soviet Union	1989–90 Fazisi
Yves Allemant	France	1973–74 Pen Duick III, 1977–78 33 Export
Anthony Allen	Great Britain	1989–90 Creighton's Naturally
David Allen	Australia	1989–90 The Card, 1997–98 Toshiba
Elizabeth Allen	Great Britain	1989–90 Creighton's Naturally
Joe Allen	New Zealand	1981–82 Flyer II, 1993–94 Yamaha
Ted Allison	United States	1977–78 King's Legend, 1981–82 Alaska Eagle, 1985–86 Philips Innovator
James Allsopp	United States	1997–98 Chessie Racing
Björn Alm	Sweden	1981–82 Swedish Entry
Jean-François Amalric	France	1981–82 Gauloises 3 & Mor Bihan
Bobo Almquist	Sweden	1989–90 The Card
Guillermo Altadill	Spain	1989–90 Fortuna Extra Lights, 1993–94 Fortuna & Galicia '93 Pescanova, 2001–02 Assa Abloy, 2005–06 Ericsson, 2008–09 Kosatka & Black Betty
Guillermo "Willy" Altadill Jr.	Spain	2014–15 Mapfre, 2017–18 Mapfre
Viannessey Ancellin	France	1985–86 Côte d'Or
Paul Andersen	Great Britain	1989–90 British Satquote Defender
Thomas Andersen	Sweden	1973–74 Keewaydin
John Anderson	Great Britain	1977–78 Flyer
Patrick Andersson	Finland	1985–86 Fazer Finland
Robert Andrews	Great Britain	1989–90 Creighton's Naturally
Gianroberto Anelli Monti	Italy	1981–82 Ilgagomma
Nicolas Angel	France	1981–82 Gauloises 3
Hein Anhold	Germany	1973–74 Peter von Danzig
Heber Ansorena	Uruguay	1993–94 Uruguay Natural
Patrick Antelme	France	1981–82 Flyer II
Heinz Aping	Germany	1981–82 Walross III Berlin
Gonzalo Araujo	Spain	2008–09 Telefónica Black
Jamie Arbonnes	Spain	1993–94 Galicia '93 Pescanova, 2008–09 Telefónica Black
Rodney Ardern	New Zealand	1993–94 Tokio, 1997–98 Swedish Match, 2001–02 Team SEB, 2005–06 Pirates of the Caribbean
Santiago Arlos	Spain	1985–86 Fortuna Lights
Alwin Arnold	Switzerland	1985–86 UBS Switzerland, 1989–90 Merit
Alick Armstrong	Great Britain	1989–90 Creighton's Naturally
Pablo Arrarte	Spain	2008–09 Telefónica Blue, 2011–12 Telefónica, 2014–15 Team Brunel, 2017–18 Mapfre
Daniele Arrigo	Italy	1981–82 Ilgagomma
Florence Arthaud	France	1989–90 Charles Jourdan
Luigi Arzenati	Italy	1973–74 Guia
P. R. G. Ash	Great Britain	1973–74 British Soldier
James Ashwood	Great Britain	1977–78 Flyer
Edwin Askew	New Zealand	1989–90 Belmont Finland II
Nils-Peter Aspestrand	Norway	1981–82 Berge Viking
Paul Audoire	France	1973–74 33 Export
Michael Austin	Great Britain	1973–74 Kriter
Isabelle Autissier	France	1997–98 EF Education
Gerad Auvray	Italy	1981–82 La Barca Laboratorio
M. Avery	South Africa	1973–74 Jakaranda
Paul Ayasse	France	1977–78 Neptune, 1989–90 Charles Jourdan

== B ==
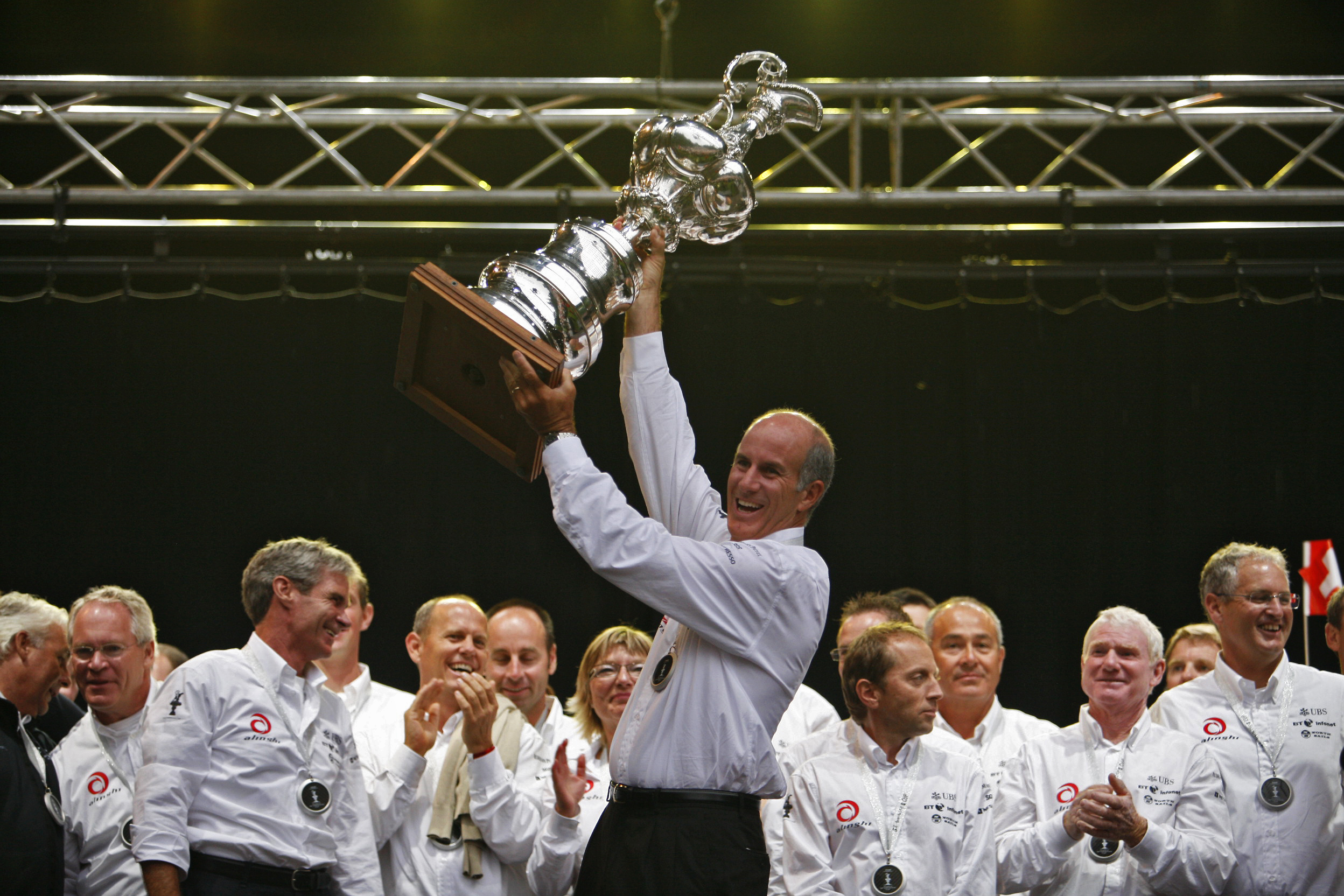
Ed Baird participated in the 1997–98 Whitbread Round the World Race.

Sailor	Nationality	Year
Bruno Bacilieri	Italy	1981–82 Rollygo
Dan Backlund	Finland	1989–90 Belmont Finland II
Par Backstrom	Finland	1989–90 Union Bank of Finland
A. C. Badrick	Great Britain	1973–74 British Soldier
Sam Badrick	Great Britain	1977–78 ADC Accutrac
Ed Baird	United States	1997–98 Innovation Kvaerner
Ian Bailey-Willmot	Great Britain	1977–78 Adventure
Louis George Baitier	France	1973–74 Tauranga
Louis Balcaen	Belgium	2014–15 Team Brunel
Louis Balcaen	Belgium	2017–18 Team Brunel
Jean-Luc Bale	France	1981–82 Euromarché
John Banfield	Great Britain	1989–90 Rothmans
Patrick Banfield	Great Britain	1985–86 Drum
Stu Bannatyne	New Zealand	1993–94 NZ Endeavour,
Stu Bannatyne	New Zealand	1997–98 Silk Cut
Stu Bannatyne	New Zealand	2001–02 Illbruck Challenge
Stu Bannatyne	New Zealand	2005–06 Movistar
Stu Bannatyne	New Zealand	2008–09 Ericsson 4
Stu Bannatyne	New Zealand	2011–12 Camper Lifelovers
Stu Bannatyne	New Zealand	2014–15 Team Alvimedica
Stu Bannatyne	New Zealand	2017–18 Dongfeng Race Team
Eric Bardaille	France	1981–82 La Barca Laboratorio
Bruno Barde	Switzerland	1977–78 Disque d'Or
Olivier Bardo	France	1989–90 Rucanor Sport
Alberto Bargues	Spain	1985–86 Fortuna Lights
Chris Barker	New Zealand	1977–78 Debenhams & King's Legend
Chris Barker	New Zealand	1981–82 Alaska Eagle
Chris Barker	New Zealand	1985–86 Drum
Chris Barker	New Zealand	1989–90 The Card
Sally Barkow	United States	2014–15 Team SCA
Guy Baron	Great Britain	1989–90 NCB Ireland
Michel Barre	France	1973–74 Pen Duick VI
Phil Barrett	Great Britain	1985–86 Drum, 1989–90 NCB Ireland
Luc Bartissol	France	1989–90 Rucanor Sport, 1993–94 La Poste
John Bartlett	Great Britain	1989–90 British Satquote Defender
Mark Barlett	Great Britain	2005–06 Brunel
Paolo Bartoli	Italy	1977–78 B&B Italia
R. G. Barton	Great Britain	1973–74 British Soldier
Paolo Bassani	Italy	1993–94 Brooksfield, 1997–98 Merit Cup
Michael Bastenie	South Africa	1981–82 Xargo III
Michael Bastenie	South Africa	1985–86 Atlantic Privateer
Michael Bastenie	South Africa	1989–90 Rothmans
Alvaro Basterra	Spain	1989–90 Fortuna Extra Lights
Nicholas Bate	Great Britain	1989–90 British Satquote Defender
Pete Bates	Great Britain	1973–74 Great Britain II
Steven Battley	Australia	1981–82 Bubblegum
Jean-Pierre Baudet	Switzerland	1985–86 UBS Switzerland
Gerard Baudraz	Switzerland	1977–78 Disque d'Or
Hans Bauer	Sweden	1981–82 Swedish Entry & Alaska Eagle, 1985–86 Drum
Philippe Bayle	France	1973–74 Kriter
Serge Bays	France	1973–74 Tauranga
Guy Beaumont	New Zealand	1985–86 Lion New Zealand
Scott Beavis	New Zealand	2001–02 Team SEB, 2005–06 ABN Amro II
Duro Bebelic	Slovenia	1993–94 Hetman Sahaidachny
Gerard Beck	France	1973–74 Grand Louis
Lynnath Beckley	South Africa	1997–98 EF Education
Wilhelm-Otto Beck	Germany	1989–90 Schlüssel von Bremen
Lisa Beecham	Australia	1993–94 Heineken
Guido Beekman	Netherlands	1985–86 Equity & Law
Peter Behncke	Germany	1989–90 Schlüssel von Bremen
Andreas Beilken	Germany	1989–90 Schlüssel von Bremen
Bouwe Bekking	Netherlands	1985–86 Philips Innovator
Bouwe Bekking	Netherlands	1993–94 Winston
Bouwe Bekking	Netherlands	1997–98 Merit Cup
Bouwe Bekking	Netherlands	2001–02 Amer Sports One
Bouwe Bekking	Netherlands	2005–06 Movistar
Bouwe Bekking	Netherlands	2008–09 Telefónica Blue
Bouwe Bekking	Netherlands	2014–15 Team Brunel
Bouwe Bekking	Netherlands	2017–18 Team Brunel
Oleg Belomylstev	Ukraine	1993–94 Hetman Sahaidachny
Josh Belsky	United States	1997–98 EF Language
Euan Belson	Great Britain	1985–86 Norsk Data GB
Alain Benech	France	1973–74 Kriter
Brian Bennett	New Zealand	1981–82 FCF Challenger
Andre Berenger	France	1977–78 Neptune, 1981–82 Charles Heidsieck III
Volkhard Berg	Germany	1989–90 Schlüssel von Bremen
Arend van Bergeijk	Netherlands	1997–98 BrunelSunergy
Yuan Berger	Switzerland	1989–90 Merit
Bohdan Berggrun	Poland	1973–74 Otago
Jens Bergmann	Germany	1989–90 Schlüssel von Bremen
Leif Bergstrom	Sweden	1989–90 The Card
Neil Bergt	United States	1981–82 Alaska Eagle
Sid Berkeley	Great Britain	1973–74 Burton Cutter
Roberto Bermúdez	Spain	1993–94 Galicia '93 Pescanova
Roberto Bermúdez	Spain	2001–02 Assa Abloy,
Roberto Bermúdez	Spain	2005–06 Brasil1
Roberto Bermúdez	Spain	2008–09 Black Betty
Roberto Bermúdez	Spain	2011–12 Camper Lifelovers
Roberto Bermúdez	Spain	2014–15 Azzam
Roberto Bermúdez	Spain	2017–18 Vestas 11th Hour Racing
Michael Berner	Finland	1985–86 Fazer Finland
Hans Bernhard	Switzerland	1977–78 Disque d'Or
Jean-Yves Bernot	France	2001–02 Djuice Dragons
Michael Berrow	Great Britain	1985–86 Drum
Paul Berrow	Great Britain	1985–86 Drum
Colin Berry	Great Britain	1973–74 Concorde
Colin Berry	Great Britain	1981–82 FCF Challenger
Colin Berry	Great Britain	1989–90 British Satquote Defender
Gilles Berthelin	France	1973–74 Grand Louis
Brice Berthier	France	1989–90 Charles Jourdan
Nicholas Berthoud	Switzerland	1989–90 Merit, 1993–94 Merit Cup
Richard Bertie	South Africa	1977–78 King's Legend
Tony Bertram	Great Britain	1977–78 ADC Accutrac, 1981–82 Xargo III
Paolo Bertoldi	Italy	1973–74 CS e RB
Annemieke Bes	Netherlands	2017–18 Team Sun Hung Kai/Scallywag
François Bessières	France	1973–74 Pen Duick VI, 1981–82 Alaska Eagle
John Best	Great Britain	1989–90 British Satquote Defender
Les Best	New Zealand	1977–78 Heath's Condor
Colin Bethell	Great Britain	1989–90 Creighton's Naturally
Stuart Bettany	New Zealand	1997–98 America's Challenge & Innovation Kvaerner, 2001–02 Illbruck Challenge
Jérémie Beyou	France	2017–18 Dongfeng Race Team
Alessandro Bezzola	Italy	1981–82 Ilgagomma
Piero Bianchessi	Italy	1973–74 Guia
Richard Bickford	Great Britain	1993–94 Reebok/Dolphin & Youth
Nick Bice	Australia	2005–06 ABN Amro II
Nick Bice	Australia	2008–09 Black Betty
Pascal Bidégorry	France	2001–02 Team SEB
Pascal Bidégorry	France	2014–15 Dongfeng Race Team
Pascal Bidégorry	France	2017–18 Dongfeng Race Team
Bill Biewenga	United States	1981–82 Flyer II
Bill Biewenga	United States	1985–86 Drum
Bill Biewenga	United States	1989–90 Charles Jourdan
Bill Biewenga	United States	1993–94 Winston
Luc Billard	France	1977–78 Japy-Hermés
Anabella Bini	Italy	1989–90 Gatorade
John Birchenough	Great Britain	1981–82 FCF Challenger
W. D. Birchenough Jr.	United States	1977–78 King's Legend
C. P. O. M. Bird	Great Britain	1973–74 Adventure
Hans Björnström	Sweden	1981–82 Swedish Entry
Michael Blair	Great Britain	1989–90 Liverpool Enterprise
James Blake	Great Britain/ New Zealand	2017–18 On-board reporter (Note: During the 17-18 race, the on-board reporters rotated between boats)
Peter Blake	New Zealand	1973–74 Burton Cutter
Peter Blake	New Zealand	1977–78 Heath's Condor
Peter Blake	New Zealand	1981–82 Ceramco New Zealand
Peter Blake	New Zealand	1985–86 Lion New Zealand
Peter Blake	New Zealand	1989–90 Steinlager 2
Jorge Blanc	Spain	1985–86 Fortuna Lights
Jorge Blanc	Spain	1989–90 Fortuna Extra Lights
David Blanchfield	Australia	1997–98 Toshiba
David Blanchfield	Australia	2001–02 Djuice Dragons
Uli Blank	Germany	1973–74 Peter von Danzig
Augusto Blasimme	Italy	1989–90 Gatorade
John Blassar	Finland	1989–90 Union Bank of Finland
Jan Blechineberg	Finland	1989–90 Martela OF
Curtis Blewett	Canada	1997–98 EF Language
Curtis Blewett	Canada	2005–06 Pirates of the Caribbean
Gregory Blomfield	New Zealand	1985–86 NZI Enterprise
Jan Blomme	Belgium	1981–82 Croky
Jan Blomme	Belgium	1985–86 Rucanor TriStar
Rene Blondel	Switzerland	1977–78 Disque d'Or
Jean Vincent Blondiau	Belgium	1977–78 King's Legend & Traité de Rome
Jean Vincent Blondiau	Belgium	1981–82 European University of Belgium
Hein Bloomers	Netherlands	1985–86 Equity & Law
Eric Blouet	France	1993–94 La Poste
Eric Blunn	Great Britain	1973–74 Great Britain II
Chay Blyth	Great Britain	1973–74 Great Britain II
Chay Blyth	Great Britain	1981–82 United Friendly
Geoffrey Boerne	South Africa	1981–82 Xargo III
Dietrich von Boetticher	Germany	1989–90 British Satquote Defender
Sergey Bogdanov	Russia	2008–09 Kosatka
Bogdan Bogdzinski	Poland	1973–74 Copernicus
Harald Bollen	Germany	1989–90 Schlüssel von Bremen
Andreas Bolte	Germany	1993–94 Hetman Sahaidachny
Alberto Bolzan	Italy	2014–15 Team Alvimedica, 2017–18 Team Brunel
Jack Bouttell	Australia	2014–15 Dongfeng Race Team
Jack Bouttell	Australia	2017–18 Dongfeng Race Team
Jack Bouttell	Australia	2023 11th Hour Racing
David Bongers	South Africa	1981–82 Xargo III
David Bongers	South Africa	1985–86 Atlantic Privateer
Eve Bonham	Great Britain	1977–78 ADC Accutrac
Charles Bonnay	France	1973–74 Pen Duick VI
Pierre Bonnet	France	1973–74 Kriter
Luca Bontempelli	Italy	1989–90 Merit
Gloria Borego	United States	1993–94 Heineken
Tom Borenius	Finland	1989–90 Union Bank of Finland
Sergei Borodinov	Soviet Union	1989–90 Fazisi
Xavier Borruat	Switzerland	1981–82 Disque d'Or 3
Alan Bose	Great Britain	1977–78 Debenhams
Franco Bosia	Italy	1977–78 B&B Italia
Serge Bosmorin	France	1977–78 Japy-Hermés
Jack Bossert	United States	1977–78 King's Legend
Rinze Botterweg	Netherlands	1985–86 Philips Innovator
Philippe Bougoim	France	1977–78 Japy-Hermés
Dominique Bourgeois	France	1981–82 Gauloises 3
Jan Bourgois	Belgium	1981–82 Croky
Hans Bouscholte	Netherlands	1997–98 BrunelSunergy
Richard Bouzaid	New Zealand	1993–94 Yamaha
Richard Bouzaid	New Zealand	1997–98 America's Challenge & Innovation Kvaerner
Richard Bouzaid	New Zealand	2005–06 Ericsson
Stig Bovbjerg	Denmark	1977–78 Traité de Rome
David Bowen	Australia	1973–74 Sayula II
A. Bowlingbroke	Great Britain	1973–74 Adventure
Michael Bradbury	Great Britain	1989–90 Liverpool Enterprise
Gavin Brady	New Zealand	1997–98 Chessie Racing, 2001–02 Team SEB
Tom Braidwood	Australia	2001–02 Team SEB
Tom Braidwood	Australia	2005–06 Ericsson
Tom Braidwood	Australia	2008–09 Green Dragon
M. Christiaan Brakman	Netherlands	1989–90 Liverpool Enterprise
Peter Brand	Australia	1977–78 Debenhams
Ralf Brauner	Germany	1989–90 Schlüssel von Bremen
Thierry Brault	France	1989–90 Charles Jourdan
Terry Bray	Great Britain	1977–78 Great Britain II
Terry Bray	Great Britain	1981–82 United Friendly
Laurent Bregeon	France	1989–90 L'Esprit de Liberté
Robert Bregeon	France	1989–90 L'Esprit de Liberté
Caj-Otso Bremer	Finland	1989–90 Martela OF
Jari Bremer	Finland	1989–90 Martela OF
Marco Bremer	Finland	1981–82 Skopbank of Finland
Christine Briand	France	1997–98 EF Education, 2001–02 Amer Sports Too
William Bridel	Great Britain	1989–90 With Integrity
François Brilliant	France	1977–78 Gauloises II
Richard Brisius	Sweden	1989–90 Gatorade, 1993–94 Brooksfield
Andrew Bristow	Great Britain	1989–90 British Satquote Defender
Caspar Brochmann	Norway	1981–82 Berge Viking
Jeff Brock	Canada	2001–02 Amer Sports One
Henry Bromby	Great Britain	2017–18 Turn the Tide on Plastic
David Brooke	New Zealand	1993–94 NZ Endeavour
Tony Brookes	Great Britain	1989–90 Belmont Finland II
Michael Broughton	Great Britain	1989–90 British Satquote Defender
Carolijn Brouwer	Netherlands	2001–02 Amer Sports Too
Carolijn Brouwer	Netherlands	2014–15 Team SCA
Carolijn Brouwer	Netherlands	2017–18 Dongfeng Race Team
B. Brown	Great Britain	1973–74 Adventure
Fraser Brown	New Zealand	2005–06 Brunel
A. E. Brown	Great Britain	1977–78 Adventure
Donal Browne	Ireland	1981–82 Traité de Rome, 1985–86 Shadow of Switzerland
Armand Broyelles	France	1973–74 Kriter
Alan Bruce	Great Britain	1985–86 Norsk Data GB
Jorge Brufau	Spain	1981–82 Licor 43, 1985–86 Fortuna Lights
Jose Brufau	Spain	1985–86 Fortuna Lights
Marc Brugger	Switzerland	1985–86 UBS Switzerland
Arnt Bruhns	Germany	1989–90 Schlüssel von Bremen
Arttu Brummer	Finland	1989–90 Martela OF
Henry Brummer	Finland	1989–90 Belmont Finland II
Karlo Brummer	Finland	1989–90 Belmont Finland II
Otso Brummer	Finland	1985–86 Fazer Finland
Andrea Bruno	Italy	1981–82 La Barca Laboratorio
Lucas Brun	Brazil	2005–06 ABN Amro II
Andrea Bruzzone	Argentina	1981–82 Vivanapoli
J. P. G. Bryans	Great Britain	1973–74 Adventure
Nick Bubb	Great Britain	2008–09 Kosatka
Warwick Buckley	New Zealand	1981–82 Flyer II
Barry Buchanan	Great Britain	1973–74 Burton Cutter, 1977–78 Heath's Condor
Robin Buchanan	Great Britain	1977–78 ADC Accutrac
D. Budge	Great Britain	1973–74 Adventure
Ian Budgen	Great Britain	2005–06 Pirates of the Caribbean, 2008–09 Green Dragon
Frederic Buffin de Chosal	Belgium	1981–82 La Barca Laboratorio
Mogens Bugge	Denmark	1981–82 Swedish Entry
Alejandre Bulajich	Mexico	1981–82 Alaska Eagle
Ian Bullivant	Great Britain	1989–90 Liverpool Enterprise
J. A. Bullock	Great Britain	1973–74 British Soldier
Gisela Bunck	Germany	1981–82 Walross III Berlin
Ivan Bunner	Great Britain	1989–90 Liverpool Enterprise
Ivan Bunner	Great Britain	1993–94 La Poste
Ivan Bunner	Great Britain	1997–98 BrunelSunergy
Joanna Burchell	Great Britain	2001–02 Amer Sports Too
Carsten Burfeind	Germany	1989–90 Schlüssel von Bremen
Conrad Burge	Australia	1973–74 Guia
Peter Burling	New Zealand	2017–18 Team Brunel
Tim Burrell	Great Britain	1981–82 FCF Challenger
Nick Burridge	New Zealand	2011–12 Camper Lifelovers
Geoffrey Bush	Great Britain	1973–74 Second Life
Killian Bushe	Ireland	1989–90 NCB Ireland
Alain Bussy	France	1977–78 Disque d'Or
Brad Butterworth	New Zealand	1989–90 Steinlager 2
Brad Butterworth	New Zealand	1993–94 Winston
Charles I. Butterworth	Great Britain	1973–74 Second Life
Michele Buzzi	Italy	1989–90 Charles Jourdan
Sandro Buzzi	Italy	1989–90 Charles Jourdan
G. I. Bye	Great Britain	1973–74 British Soldier
Gerry Byrne	Ireland	1989–90 NCB Ireland

== C ==
Sailor	Nationality	Year
João Cabeçadas	Portugal	1989–90 L'Esprit de Liberté, 1993–94 La Poste, 1997–98 BrunelSunergy
Daniel Cadene	France	1989–90 La Poste
R. C. Caesley	Great Britain	1977–78 Adventure
Dee Caffari	Great Britain	2014–15 Team SCA, 2017–18 Turn the Tide on Plastic
Matteo Caglieris	Italy	1981–82 Save Venice & Rollygo
Adrienne Cahalan	Australia	1993–94 Heineken, 2005–06 Brasil1
Benoit Caignaert	France	1993–94 La Poste
Bruno Caire	France	1977–78 Japy-Hermés
Gerard Caire	France	1977–78 Japy-Hermés
Domino Callahand	France	1981–82 Charles Heidsieck III
Jordi Calafat	Spain	2008–09 Telefónica Blue, 2011–12 Telefónica
Franck Cammas	France	2011–12 Groupama 4
Peter Cameron	Australia	1981–82 Bubblegum
Christopher Cann	Great Britain	1981–82 United Friendly
Andrew Cape	Australia	1993–94 Tokio, 1997–98 Toshiba, 2005–06 Movistar & Ericsson, 2008–09 Il Mostro, 2011–12 Telefónica, 2014–15 Team Brunel, 2017–18 Team Brunel
Paolo Caputo	Great Britain	1989–90 Gatorade
Horacio Carabelli	Brazil	2005–06 Brasil1, 2008–09 Ericsson 4
Loïc Caradec	France	1973–74 Grand Louis, 1977–78 Gauloises II
Jacques Caraes	France	1993–94 La Poste
Merritt Carey	United States	1993–94 Heineken
Philippe Cardis	Switzerland	1977–78 Disque d'Or, 1981–82 Disque d'Or 3
A. N. Carlier	Great Britain	1973–74 British Soldier
Brian Carlin	Ireland	2014–15 Team Vestas Wind (Note: On-board reporter)
Enrique Carlin Torios	Mexico	1973–74 Sayula II
Francisco Carlin	Mexico	1973–74 Sayula II
Paquita Carlin	Mexico	1973–74 Sayula II
Ramon Carlin	Mexico	1973–74 Sayula II
Carl-Ake Carlsson	Finland	1985–86 Fazer Finland
Richard Carlyle	Great Britain	1973–74 Second Life
François Carpente	France	1985–86 Côte d'Or, 1989–90 Charles Jourdan
Graham Carpenter	Great Britain	1977–78 Heath's Condor
Jean Michel Carpentier	France	1973–74 Grand Louis
Patrice Carpentier	France	1973–74 Grand Louis, 1977–78 Gauloises II
Marco Carpi	Italy	1981–82 Traité de Rome
Mariano Carrara	Italy	1977–78 B&B Italia
Jason Carrington	Great Britain	1993–94 Fortuna, 1997–98 Silk Cut, 2001–02 Assa Abloy, 2005–06 Ericsson
John Carter	Great Britain	1977–78 Heath's Condor
James Carroll	Ireland	2008–09 Green Dragon
Massimo Casali	Italy	1985–86 Norsk Data GB
John Casey	Great Britain	1989–90 Creighton's Naturally
Mark Cashen	New Zealand	1981–82 European University Belgium
Claudio Casiriaghi	Switzerland	1993–94 Merit Cup
Kent Cassels	United States	1985–86 Norsk Data GB
Ignacio Castaner de la Torre	Spain	1989–90 Fortuna Extra Lights
Jean Castenet	France	1977–78 Neptune
Manuel Castilla	France	1993–94 La Poste
Franco Cattai	Italy	1989–90 Gatorade
Alain Caudrelier	France	1977–78 Neptune
Charles Caudrelier	France	2011–12 Groupama 4, 2014–15 Dongfeng Race Team, 2017–18 Dongfeng Race Team
Christien Cavalier	France	1981–82 33 Export
Paul Cayard	United States	1997–98 EF Language, 2001–02 Amer Sports One, 2005–06 Pirates of the Caribbean
Claudio Celon	Italy	2001–02 Amer Sports One
Jean Philippe Chabaud	France	1973–74 Pen Duick VI
Bernard Challis	New Zealand	1981–82 Xargo III
Paolo Chamaz	Italy	1973–74 Tauranga
N. M. C. Chambers	Great Britain	1977–78 Adventure, 1993–94 Brooksfield
Bruno Champly	France	1981–82 Charles Heidsieck III
Keith Chapman	New Zealand	1981–82 Ceramco New Zealand, 1989–90 Fisher & Paykel
Lucas Chapman	Australia	2017–18 Turn the Tide on Plastic
Stephen Chapman	Australia	1985–86 Philips Innovator
Joel Charpentier	France	1973–74 Kriter
Didier Charton	Switzerland	1977–78 Disque d'Or
Pierre Chassin	France	1973–74 Concorde
Ying Kit Cheng	China	2014–15 Dongfeng Race Team
Sergei Cherbakov	Ukraine	1993–94 Hetman Sahaidachny
Neil Cheston	Great Britain	1985–86 Drum, 1989–90 Rothmans
Jean Chevalier	France	1993–94 Brooksfield
Marco Chiara	Italy	1973–74 Burton Cutter
Antonio Chioatto	Italy	1977–78 Traité de Rome, 1981–82 Traité de Rome
Joanne Chittenden	Great Britain	1989–90 Creighton's Naturally
John Chittenden	Great Britain	1989–90 Creighton's Naturally
Susan Chiu	United States	1993–94 Heineken
Zygmunt Choreń	Poland	1973–74 Otago
P. N. Chowns	Great Britain	1973–74 Adventure
Donald Crighton	Great Britain	1981–82 Save Venice
Stuart Childerley	Great Britain	2001–02 Team News Corp
Mark Christensen	New Zealand	1993–94 Winston, 1997–98 EF Language, 2001–02 Illbruck Challenge, 2005–06 ABN Amro I
Guo Chuan	China	2008–09 Green Dragon (Note: Media crew member)
Rodney Churchill	Great Britain	1985–86 Norsk Data GB
Maciel Cicchetti	Argentina	2008–09 Telefónica Black, 2014–15 Team Vestas Wind, 2017–18 Team Brunel
Witold Ciecholewski	Poland	1973–74 Otago
Sophie Ciszek	United States/Australia	2014–15 Team SCA, 2017–18 Mapfre
Michael Clancy	United States	1977–78 King's Legend
Francesca Clapcich	Italy	2017–18 Turn the Tide on Plastic
R. Clare	Great Britain	1973–74 Adventure
Derek Clark	New Zealand	1997–98 Chessie Racing
Latimer Clark	Great Britain	1989–90 British Satquote Defender
Sally Clark	Great Britain	1989–90 Creighton's Naturally
Richard Clarke	Canada	2001–02 Illbruck Challenge
Sean Clarkson	New Zealand	1993–94 NZ Endeavour, 1997–98 Toshiba, 2001–02 Team SEB
Carsten Claub	Germany	1981–82 Walross III Berlin
François Claude	France	1981–82 Charles Heidsieck III
Dennis Claus	United States	1981–82 FCF Challenger
Julian Clegg	Great Britain	1989–90 With Integrity, 1993–94 Hetman Sahaidachny
Marleen Cleyndert	Netherlands	1993–94 Heineken, 1997–98 EF Education
Jim Close	Australia	1989–90 The Card, 1993–94 Tokio, 1997–98 Innovation Kvaerner, 2001–02 Team Tyco
Justin Clougher	Australia	1997–98 EF Language, 2005–06 Pirates of the Caribbean
Tom Clout	Australia	2017–18 Team Sun Hung Kai/Scallywag
Alan Coad	Ireland	1989–90 Creighton's Naturally
Maurizio Cocco	Italy	1989–90 Gatorade
Joaquin Coello	Spain	1981–82 Licor 43
Andrew Coghill	Great Britain	1989–90 With Integrity
John Coleman	Great Britain	1981–82 Traité de Rome
Roddy Coleman	Great Britain	1977–78 Heath's Condor
David Collard	Great Britain	1989–90 Creighton's Naturally
Richard Collard	Great Britain	1989–90 Creighton's Naturally
Alain Collett	France	1981–82 Euromarché, 1985–86 Côte d'Or
Pierre Collet	France	1989–90 Charles Jourdan
George Collins	United States	1997–98 Chessie Racing
Ian Collison	Great Britain	1989–90 Creighton's Naturally
Patricia Colmant	France	1977–78 Traité de Rome
Andrea Colombo	Switzerland	1985–86 UBS Switzerland
Yves de Comimck	Belgium	1981–82 Croky, 1985–86 Rucanor TriStar
Georges Commarmond	France	1973–74 Kriter
Dominique Conin	France	1993–94 La Poste
Dennis Conner	United States	1993–94 Winston, 1997–98 Toshiba
Shaun Connolly	New Zealand	1985–86 Atlantic Privateer & Drum, 1989–90 Fisher & Paykel
Ray Conrady	United States	1973–74 Sayula II
Marco Constant	Netherlands	1985–86 Atlantic Privateer, 1993–94 Intrum Justitia, 1997–98 EF Language
Bianca Cook	New Zealand	2017–18 Turn the Tide on Plastic
Dean Cook	New Zealand	1985–86 Norsk Data GB
Gareth Cooke	New Zealand	2001–02 Team SEB, 2005–06 Brunel
Stefan Coppers	Netherlands	2014–15 Team Brunel
Laurent Cordelle	France	1989–90 Gatorade
Gerald Cordingley	Great Britain	1977–78 Great Britain II
Graeme Corlett	Australia	1973–74 Concorde
Anton Corominas	Spain	1993–94 Fortuna
Thomas Corness	Canada	1985–86 Atlantic Privateer
Nicolas Cortes Petersen	Mexico	1981–82 Alaska Eagl & Bubblegum
Jean François Coste	France	1981–82 Mor Bihan, 1985–86 Côte d'Or
Bertrand Costey	France	1981–82 33 Export
Ben Costello	New Zealand	2008–09 Kosatka & Black Betty
Steve Cotton	Australia	1993–94 Yamaha, 1997–98 Toshiba, 2001–02 Team News Corp & Team SEB
Philippe Court	France	1977–78 Neptune
Max Couteau	France	1989–90 Charles Jourdan
Mark Covell	Great Britain	2008–09 Kosatka
Thomas Coville	France	2001–02 Djuice Dragons, 2011–12 Groupama 4
John Covington	Great Britain	1977–78 Debenhams
Martin Cowell	Great Britain	1981–82 United Friendly
M. E. Cox	Great Britain	1973–74 British Soldier
Sue Crafer	Great Britain	1993–94 Heineken
Guy Craps	Switzerland	1985–86 UBS Switzerland, 1989–90 Merit
Godfrey Cray	New Zealand	1981–82 Outward Bound, 1985–86 Lion New Zealand, 1989–90 Steinlager 2, 1993–94 Yamaha & Winston
Sally Creaser	Great Britain	1989–90 Maiden
Keith Crellin	Great Britain	1985–86 Norsk Data GB
Jacimo Criado	Spain	1981–82 Licor 43
Donald Crichton	Great Britain	1981–82 Save Venice
Steven Crighton Boulter	Great Britain	1989–90 Charles Jourdan
Antoine Croyere	France	1973–74 Pen Duick VI
Jay Crum	United States	1989–90 Charles Jourdan
Mendez Crusat	Spain	1989–90 Fortuna Extra Lights
M. C. Cruz		1973–74 Pen Duick III
Roberto Cubas Carline	Mexico	1973–74 Sayula II
Harold Cudmore	Ireland	1977–78 Traité de Rome
M. Cuiklinski	France	1973–74 Pen Duick III
Andrew Culley	Great Britain	1973–74 Burton Cutter, 1977–78 Heath's Condor
Herve Cunnigham	France	2001–02 Djuice Dragons
Valerie Cunningham	Great Britain	1989–90 Creighton's Naturally
Simon Cunnington	Australia	1993–94 Reebok/Dolphin & Youth
J. A. Cuthill	Great Britain	1973–74 British Soldier

== D ==
Sailor	Nationality	Year
Pierre Dagreves	France	1973–74 Guia
Jean Pierre Dagues	France	1973–74 Pen Duick VI
Frederic Dahirel	France	1989–90 Charles Jourdan
Claes Dahlberg	Finland	1989–90 Belmont Finland II
Anders Dahlsjö	Sweden	2008–09 Ericson 3
Kevin Dakin	Great Britain	1981–82 Bubblegum
Arnaud Dalhenx	France	1973–74 Pen Duick VI
Pietro D'Alì	Italy	1993–94 Brooksfield
Tony Dallimore	Great Britain	1977–78 Debenhams
Butch Dalrymple-Smith	Great Britain	1973–74 Sayula II
Grant Dalton	New Zealand	1981–82 Flyer II, 1985–86 Lion New Zealand, 1989–90 Fisher & Paykel, 1993–94 NZ Endeavour, 1997–98 Merit Cup, 2001–02 Amer Sports One
W. J. Damerell	South Africa	1973–74 Jakaranda
Jens Dammeyer	Germany	1989–90 Schlüssel von Bremen
Nick Dana	United States	2011–12 Azzam, 2014–15 Team Alvimedica, 2017–18 Vestas 11th Hour Racing
Ed Danby	New Zealand	1985–86 Lion New Zealand, 1989–90 Fisher & Paykel
Yvon Daniel	France	1981–82 Euromarché, 1989–90 Charles Jourdan
Brian Daniels	Great Britain	1973–74 Great Britain II
Raymond Dardel	Switzerland	1989–90 Merit
Andre Darmon	Switzerland	1989–90 Merit
Brendan Darrar	Ireland	1993–94 Reebok/Dolphin & Youth
Alain D'Auzac	France	1973–74 Kriter
Etienne David	Switzerland	1993–94 Merit Cup
C. Davies	Great Britain	1973–74 British Soldier
Kenneth Davies	New Zealand	1985–86 NZI Enterprise, 1989–90 Fisher & Paykel
Samantha Davies	Great Britain	2014–15 Team SCA
Sarah Davies	Great Britain	1989–90 Maiden
Ramon (Ray) Davies	New Zealand	1997–98 Merit Cup, 2001–02 Illbruck Challenge
Greg Davis	South Africa	1985–86 Atlantic Privateer
Byran Dawson	New Zealand	1977–78 King's Legend
J. T. Day	Great Britain	1973–74 British Soldier
Alexis De Cenival	France	1993–94 Winston
Marc Decrey	Switzerland	1989–90 Merit
Roger Deakins	Great Britain	1977–78 Debenhams
David Dean	South Africa	1973–74 Concorde
John Dean	Australia	1973–74 Tauranga
John Deane	Great Britain	1977–78 Great Britain II
Carlo Degiorgis	Italy	1981–82 Vivanapoli
Daniele De Grassi	Italy	1989–90 Gatorade
Bernard Deguy	France	1973–74 Kriter & Pen Duick VI, 1977–78 Neptune
Karl Dehler	Germany	1989–90 Schlüssel von Bremen
Jan Dekker	South Africa	1997–98 Silk Cut, 2001–02 Team Tyco, 2005–06 ABN Amro I
Jean-Pierre Delaby	France	1985–86 L'Esprit d'équipe
Etienne Delacretaz	Switzerland	1989–90 Merit
Fabien Delahaye	France	2017–18 Dongfeng Race Team
Javier De La Gandara	Spain	1989–90 Fortuna Extra Lights, 1993–94 Galicia '93 Pescanova
Gian Del Bono	Italy	1981–82 Vivanapoli
Patrick Deloffe	France	1993–94 La Poste
Jacques Delorme	France	1989–90 Charles Jourdan, 1993–94 La Poste
Sylvie Delinondes	France	1977–78 33 Export
Maurice Demspey	Great Britain	1989–90 Creighton's Naturally
George De Neef	Netherlands	1981–82 Alaska Eagle
Kees De Nijs	Netherlands	1989–90 Rucanor Sport
Richard Deppe	Great Britain	1993–94 Fortuna, 1997–98 Chessie Racing, 2008–09 Il Mostro
Jean-Marc De Schotten	France	1981–82 Euromarché
Michel Desjoyeaux	France	1985–86 Côte d'Or, 1989–90 Charles Jourdan, 1993–94 La Poste, 2014–15 Mapfre
Olivier Despaigne	France	1981–82 Charles Heidsieck III
Beppe Dessi	Italy	1989–90 Gatorade
Hugues Destremau	France	1993–94 La Poste
Sebastien Destremau	France	1997–98 Innovation Kvaerner
Philippe De Troy	Belgium	1981–82 Croky
D. De Valero-Willis	Great Britain	1981–82 Xargo III
Brent Devenport	New Zealand	1989–90 Liverpool Enterprise
Vincent Devictor	France	1977–78 33 Export, 1981–82 Charles Heidsieck III
Susan Devine	Australia	1989–90 Creighton's Naturally
Eric Dewy	Australia	1989–90 Fisher & Paykel
Paul D'Hollander	Belgium	1985–86 Rucanor TriStar
Hannah Diamond	Great Britain	2017–18 Vestas 11th Hour Racing
Andrew Dibsdall	Great Britain	1989–90 Liverpool Enterprise
Chris Dickson	New Zealand	1993–94 Tokio, 1997–98 Toshiba
David Dickson	Great Britain	1977–78 Heath's Condor
Maniacco Diego	Italy	1981–82 La Barca Laboratorio
Marco Diena	Italy	1981–82 La Barco Laboratorio, 1989–90 Gatorade
Gerard Dijkstra	Netherlands	1977–78 Flyer
Adriano Di Majo	Italy	1977–78 B&B Italia
Corrado Di Majo	Italy	1977–78 B&B Italia, 1989–90 Gatorade
Richard Dinsdale	Great Britain	1981–82 Outward Bound
Herve Dispa	France	1989–90 Charles Jourdan
Richard Dodson	New Zealand	2001–02 Team Tyco
Tom Dodson	New Zealand	1997–98 Merit Cup
J. Doherty	Great Britain	1973–74 British Soldier
Jens Dolmer	Denmark	2008–09 Ericsson 3, 2014–15 Team Brunel
Jean Marc Domange	France	1977–78 Neptune
Jordi Domenech	Spain	1989–90 Fortuna Extra Lights
Ugo Dominici	Italy	1977–78 B&B Italia
Marc van Dongen	Netherlands	1985–86 Philips Innovator
Bernard Donnezan	France	1977–78 Neptune
José Doreste	Spain	1989–90 Fortuna Extra Lights
Peter Dorien	Australia	2001–02 Djuice Dragons & Team News Corp, 2005–06 Movistar
Oleg Doroshenko	Latvia	1993–94 Odessa
Yury Doroshenko	Ukraine	1989–90 Fazisi, 1993–94 Hetman Sahaidachny
Frederick Dovaston	Great Britain	1977–78 ADC Accutrac
Gregory Dowling	United States	1993–94 Hetman Sahaidachny
Noel Drennan	Ireland	2001–02 Illbruck Challenge, 2005–06 Movistar
Andreas Dreschler	Germany	1981–82 Walross III Berlin
Alexei Drosdovsky	Soviet Union	1989–90 Fazisi
Michel Drouart	Tahiti	1973–74 Guia
Anna Drougge	Sweden	1997–98 EF Education, 2001–02 Amer Sports Too
Eric Drouglazet	France	1997–98 BrunelSunergy
Pauline Duart	Great Britain	1989–90With Integrity
Jean Louis Duboc	France	1973–74 Kriter
Bruno Dubois	Belgium	1989–90 Rucanor Sport
Yves Dubos	France	1981–82 Ilgagomma
Robin Duchesne	Great Britain	1977–78 Adventure
Patrice Ducourtioux	France	1973–74 Tauranga
Damien Duke	Australia	2001–02 Team News Corp
Dolph Du Mont	United States	1993–94 Odessa
Nick Dunlop	Great Britain	1977–78 Great Britain II
Patrice Dumas	France	1977–78 33 Export
François Dumont	Belgium	1985–86 Côte d'Or
Cameron Dunn	New Zealand	2011–12 Sanya Lan
Daniel Dupont	France	1981–82 33 Export
Jean Noel Durand	France	1973–74 Tauranga
Anton Dusseljee	Netherlands	1977–78 Tielsa
Albert Dykema	Netherlands	1977–78 Flyer

== E ==
Sailor	Nationality	Year
Fernando Echavarri	Spain	2005–06 Movistar, 2008–09 Telefónica Black
Támara Echegoyen	Spain	2017–18 Mapfre
Finn Eckbo	Norway	1981–82 Berge Viking
Michael Eckstein	Great Britain	1989–90 Creighton's Naturally
Philip Eckstein	Great Britain	1989–90 Creighton's Naturally
C. Edge	Great Britain	1973–74 British Soldier
L. Edinger	Great Britain	1973–74 British Soldier
Jen Edney	United States	2017–18 On-board reporter
A. W. D. Edsor	Great Britain	1973–74 British Soldier
Chris Edwards	Great Britain	1973–74 Burton Cutter, 1977–78 Heath's Condor
Richard Edwards	Great Britain	2017–18 On-board reporter
S. A. Edwards	Great Britain	1973–74 British Soldier
Tracy Edwards	Great Britain	1985–86 Norsk Data GB & Atlantic Privateer, 1989–90 Maiden
Nicola Egger		1973–74 Pen Duick III
Abby Ehler	Great Britain	2014–15 Team SCA, 2017–18 Team Brunel
Mats Ehrnooth	Finland	1985–86 Fazer Finland
Urs Eiholzer	Switzerland	1977–78 Disque d'Or
Leif Ekman	Finland	1981–82 Skopbank of Finland
Nils Ekmark	Sweden	1981–82 Swedish Entry
Bill Elgie	Great Britain	1973–74 Burton Cutter
Anna-Lena Elled	Sweden	2014–15 Team SCA
Jeremy Elliot	Ireland	2008–09 Kosatka
Patrick Elies	France	1973–74 Grand Louis
Karl-Olof Elmdahl	Sweden	1973–74 Keewaydin
Pascal Emeriau	France	1973–74 Tauranga
David Endean	New Zealand	2001–02 Team Tyco, 2005–06 ABN Amro I, 2008–09 Ericsson 4
Donald England	New Zealand	1981–82 Ceramco New Zealand
Joe English (sailor)	Ireland	1989–90 NCB Ireland, 1993–94 Tokio, 1997–98 Toshiba
Charles Enright	United States	2014–15 Team Alvimedica, 2017–18 Vestas 11th Hour Racing
P. Enzer	Great Britain	1977–78 Adventure
Steve Erickson	United States	1997–98 EF Language
Berend Erling	Germany	1989–90 Schlüssel von Bremen
Kevin Escoffier	France	2014–15 Dongfeng Race Team, 2017–18 Dongfeng Race Team
Frank Esson	Great Britain	1989–90 British Satquote Defender

== F ==
Sailor	Nationality	Year
Oliosi Fabio	Italy	1981–82 La Barca Laboratorio
Marco Facca	Italy	1977–78 B&B Italia
Philippe Facque	France	1973–74 Grand Louis
James Fagan	Australia	1989–90 Liverpool Enterprise
Terence Fair	Great Britain	1985–86 Norsk Data GB
Tom Faire	New Zealand	1997–98 America's Challenge
Giorgio Falck	Italy	1973–74 Guia, 1981–82 Rollygo, 1989–90 Gatorade
Giovanni Falck	Italy	1981–82 Rollygo, 1989–90 Gatorade
Shannon Falcone	Netherlands Antilles	2008–09 Il Mostro, 2011–12 Mar Mostro
Jez Fanstone	Great Britain	1997–98 Silk Cut, 2001–02 Team News Corp
Michael Farley	United States	1981–82 Alaska Eagle
John Farmer	Great Britain	1989–90 Creighton's Naturally
A. J. Farnes	Great Britain	1977–78 Adventure
Paul Farr	Great Britain	1989–90 With Integrity
Brad Farrand	New Zealand	2017–18 team AkzoNobel
Angela Farrell	Ireland	1989–90 Maiden
Nicholas Farrimond	Great Britain	1989–90 Liverpool Enterprise
Gordon Farthing	Great Britain	1981–82 FCF Challenger, 1993–94 Hetman Sahaidachny
Romuald Favraud	France	1989–90 Charles Jourdan
Peter Fazer	Finland	1985–86 Fazer Finland
Pierre Fehlmann	Switzerland	1977–78 Disque d'Or
Pierre Fehlmann	Switzerland	1981–82 Disque d'Or 3 (later Maiden)
Pierre Fehlmann	Switzerland	1985–86 UBS Switzerland
Pierre Fehlmann	Switzerland	1989–90 Merit
Pierre Fehlmann	Switzerland	1993–94 Merit Cup
Klaus Feldmann	Germany	1989–90 Schlüssel von Bremen
Lars Fellman	Finland	1985–86 Fazer" Finland, 1989–90 Union Bank of Finland
Henrik Fenstrom	Finland	1985–86 Fazer Finland
Eric Ferguson	Great Britain	1989–90 Creighton's Naturally
Francisco Fernandez	Spain	1981–82 Licor 43, 1989–90 Fortuna Extra Lights, 1993–94 Galicia '93 Pescanova
Juan Fernandez	Spain	1989–90 Fortuna Extra Lights
Paco Fernández	Spain	1993–94 Galicia '93 Pescanova
Xabier Fernández	Spain	2005–06 Movistar
Xabier Fernández	Spain	2008–09 Telefónica Blue
Xabier Fernández	Spain	2011–12 Telefónica
Xabier Fernández	Spain	2014–15 Mapfre
Xabier Fernández	Spain	2017–18 Mapfre
Giovanni Ferreri	Italy	1993–94 Merit Cup
Vittorio Ferreri	Italy	1977–78 B&B Italia
Sharon Ferris	New Zealand	2001–02 Amer Sports Too
Justin Ferris	New Zealand	1997–98 EF Language
Justin Ferris	New Zealand	2005–06 Pirates of the Caribbean
Justin Ferris	New Zealand	2008–09 Il Mostro
Justin Ferris	New Zealand	2011–12 Azzam
Justin Ferris	New Zealand	2017–18 team AkzoNobel
Marcelo Ferreira	Brazil	2005–06 Brasil1, 2008–09 Black Betty
Campbell Field	New Zealand	1997–98 America's Challenge, 2001–02 Team News Corp, 2005–06 Brunel
Ross Field	New Zealand	1985–86 NZI Enterprise
Ross Field	New Zealand	1989–90 Steinlager 2
Ross Field	New Zealand	1993–94 Yamaha
Ross Field	New Zealand	1997–98 America's Challenge
Ross Field	New Zealand	2001–02 Team News Corp
John Fielder	Great Britain	1977–78 Great Britain II
Patrick Fierre	France	1973–74 33 Export
Gert Findel	Germany	1973–74 Peter von Danzig
Edgardo Fischer	Argentina	1981–82 Flyer II
Mark Fischer	United States	1997–98 Chessie Racing
Manuel Fischler	Switzerland	1989–90 Merit, 1993–94 Merit Cup
John Fisher	Great Britain	2017–18 Team Sun Hung Kai/Scallywag, Lost at sea
Jonathan Fisher	Great Britain	1989–90 With Integrity
Mark Fisher	Great Britain	1989–90 With Integrity
Simon Fisher	Great Britain	2005–06 ABN Amro II
Simon Fisher	Great Britain	2008–09 Telefónica Blue
Simon Fisher	Great Britain	2011–12 Azzam
Simon Fisher	Great Britain	2014–15 Azzam
Simon Fisher	Great Britain	2017–18 Vestas 11th Hour Racing
Joanne Fishman	United States	1981–82 FCF Challenger
Morris Fleege	Finland	1989–90 Union Bank of Finland
Timothy Fleming	United States	1981–82 Save Venice
Graham Fleury	New Zealand	1985–86 NZI Enterprise, 1989–90 Steinlager 2
Neville Flint	Australia	1989–90 Creighton's Naturally
Greg Flynn	New Zealand	1993–94 Yamaha, 1997–98 America's Challenge
Terence Flynn	New Zealand	1981–82 Outward Bound
Patrice Foillard	France	1989–90 L'Esprit de Liberté
Marie-Laure Fourlinnie	France	1977–78 33 Export
Daniel Fong	New Zealand	1997–98 America's Challenge & Toshiba
Ugo Fonollá	Spain	2017–18 On-board reporter
Andre Fonseca	Brazil	2005–06 Brasil1
Andre Fonseca	Brazil	2008–09 Black Betty
Andre Fonseca	Brazil	2014–15 Mapfre
António Fontes	Portugal	2017–18 team AkzoNobel and Sun Hung Kai/Scallywag
Colin Forbes	Great Britain	1973–74 Burton Cutter
Adrian Ford	New Zealand	1977–78 Flyer
Martin Ford	New Zealand	1989–90 Lion New Zealand
C. P. O. M. Forrest	Great Britain	1973–74 Adventure
Daniel Forster	Switzerland	1985–86 UBS Switzerland
Kenneth Forster	Great Britain	1985–86 Norsk Data GB
Massimo Fossati	Italy	1989–90 Gatorade
Y. B. Foucou	France	1977–78 33 Export
Marie-Laure Fourlinnie	France	1977–78 33 Export
Olivier Fourment	France	1981–82 Gauloises 3
Wessel de Fouw	Netherlands	1985–86 Equity & Law
Damian Foxall	Ireland	2001–02 Team Tyco
Damian Foxall	Ireland	2005–06 Ericsson
Damian Foxall	Ireland	2008–09 Green Dragon
Damian Foxall	Ireland	2011–12 Groupama 4
Damian Foxall	Ireland	2014–15 Dongfeng Race Team
Damian Foxall	Ireland	2017–18 Vestas 11th Hour Racing
Jean-Michel Foxonet	France	1989–90 La Poste
Clare Francis	Great Britain	1977–78 ADC Accutrac
Enrico Francolini	Italy	1977–78 B&B Italia
Nance Frank	United States	1993–94 Heineken
Jean Marc Frantz	Luxembourg	1977–78 Traité de Rome
Albino Fravezzi	Italy	1993–94 Brooksfield
Jason Freeborn	Great Britain	1989–90 With Integrity
Andrew Freeman	Great Britain	1985–86 Shadow of Switzerland
Richard Freeman-Cowan	Great Britain	1985–86 Drum
Wold Freitag	Germany	1981–82 Walross III Berlin
Bernardo Freitas	Portugal	2017–18 Turn the Tide on Plastic
Luc Frejacques	France	1985–86 Côte d'Or
Francis Freon	France	1977–78 Gauloises II
Jan Friberg	Sweden	1981–82 Swedish Entry
Konrad Frost	Great Britain	2017–18 On-board reporter
Knut Frostad	Norway	1993–94 Intrum Justitia
Knut Frostad	Norway	1997–98 Innovation Kvaerner
Knut Frostad	Norway	2001–02 Djuice Dragons
Knut Frostad	Norway	2005–06 Brasil1
Diego Fructuoso	Spain	2011–12 Telefónica
Julian Fuller	Great Britain	1981–82 Flyer II, 1985–86 Atlantic Privateer
Mark Fullerton	Australia	2005–06 Brunel
Angus Fyfe	Great Britain	1981–82 Bubblegum

== G ==
Sailor	Nationality	Year
Gianfranco Gabaldo	Italy	1981–82 Ilgagomma
Alain Gabbay	France	1977–78 33 Export, 1981–82 Charles Heidsieck III, 1989–90 Charles Jourdan
Philip Gadey	Belgium	1981–82 European University Belgium
Kenneth Gahmberg	Finland	1981–82 Skopbank of Finland
Stefan Gahmberg	Finland	1981–82 Skopbank of Finland
Didier Gainette	France	1989–90 Martela OF
Jamie Gale	New Zealand	2001–02 Illbruck Challenge
Kenneth Gale	Great Britain	1989–90 Creighton's Naturally
Marco Galimberti	Italy	1973–74 Tauranga
Tomas Gallart	Spain	1981–82 Licor 43
Amanda Gallow	Great Britain	1989–90 British Satquote Defender
Marco Galzenati	Italy	1981–82 Vivanapoli
Gerard Garcia	France	1981–82 Traité de Rome
Santiago Garcia-Cascon	Spain	1981–82 Licor 43
Mark Gardener	United States	1981–82 33 Export
Andres Gasser	Switzerland	1985–86 UBS Switzerland
Pascal Gateau	France	1981–82 Mor Bihan
Charles Gates	United States	1985–86 Drum
Donald Gautier	Switzerland	1977–78 Disque d'Or
Sidney Gavignet	France	1993–94 La Poste, 2001–02 Assa Abloy, 2005–06 ABN Amro I, 2008–09 Il Mostro, 2015–16 Dongfeng Race Team
Vincent Gazeau	France	1977–78 Gauloises II
Vincent Geake	Great Britain	1989–90 Rothmans, 1993–94 Fortuna, 1997–98 Silk Cut
Harry Gedda	Sweden	1973–74 Keewaydin
Alexander Geelen	Netherlands	1989–90 Equity & Law II
Greg Gendell	United States	1997–98 Chessie Racing
Arjen van Gent	Netherlands	1997–98 BrunelSunergy
Burkhard Gerling	Germany	1981–82 Traité de Rome
John Giblett	Great Britain	1977–78 Adventure, 1989–90 British Satquote Defender
Richard Gibson	Ireland	1989–90 NCB Ireland
Daniel Gilard	France	1985–86 L'Esprit d'équipe
Julian Gildersleeves	Great Britain	1977–78 Heath's Condor
D. M. Gill	Great Britain	1973–74 British Soldier
Daniel Gilles	France	1977–78 Neptune
Greg Gillette	United States	1981–82 Alaska Eagle
Karl Gillette	Great Britain	1985–86 Norsk Data GB
Vincent Gillioz	Switzerland	1989–90 Merit
Michel Girard	France	1973–74 Kriter
Pascal Girardin	Switzerland	1985–86 UBS Switzerland
Robert Girardin	France	1973–74 Tauranga, 1977–78 Traité de Rome
Etienne Giroire	France	1989–90 The Card
Beat Gittinger	Switzerland	1977–78 ADC Accutrac
Heinz Glahr	Germany	1989–90 Schlüssel von Bremen
G. H. Glasgow	Great Britain	1977–78 Adventure
Alain Glicksman	France	1973–74 Kriter
D. T. I. Glyn Owen	Great Britain	1973–74 British Soldier
Ryan Godfrey	Australia	2008–09 Ericsson 4, 2011–12 Mar Mostro
Christian Goecke	Germany	1989–90 Schlüssel von Bremen
Felipe Gomez	Uruguay	1993–94 Uruguay Natural
Joanna Gooding	Great Britain	1989–90 Maiden
John Goodwin	South Africa	1973–74 Jakaranda
Konstantin Gordeiko	Ukraine	1993–94 Hetman Sahaidachny
Jean Gosswiller	France	1989–90 Rucanor Sport
Alex Gough	Australia	2017–18 Team Sun Hung Kai/Scallywag
Terry Gould	New Zealand	1989–90 NCB Ireland
Martine Grael	Brazil	2017–18 team AkzoNobel
Torben Grael	Brazil	1997–98 Innovation Kvaerner, 2005–06 Brasil1, 2008–09 Ericsson 4
Bob Graham	New Zealand	1989–90 Lion New Zealand
Neil Graham	Australia	1989–90 Rothmans, 1993–94 Fortuna, 1997–98 Silk Cut
Jesper Gram	Denmark	1985–86 SAS Baia Viking
Kiell Granberg	Sweden	1981–82 Swedish Entry
S. Gray	Great Britain	1973–74 Adventure
Scott Gray	Great Britain	2008–09 Kosatka
Paolo Grazioli	Italy	1973–74 CS e RB
Alan Green	Great Britain	1977–78 Debenhams
Paul Green	Australia	1989–90 Liverpool Enterprise
P. J. C. Green	Great Britain	1973–74 British Soldier
Sam Greenfield	United States	2014–15 Dongfeng Race Team, 2017–18 On-board reporter (Note: OBR17)
Libby Greenhalgh	Great Britain	2014–15 Team SCA
Robert Greenhalgh	Great Britain	2005–06 ABN Amro I, 2008–09 Il Mostro, 2011–12 Azzam, 2014–15 Mapfre, 2017–18 Mapfre
Matthew Gregory	United States	2008–09 Black Betty
Yvan Griboval	France	1985–86 L'Esprit d'équipe
Theresa Griffiths	Great Britain	1981–82 United Friendly
Jean Claude Grigaux	France	1973–74 Pen Duick III
Wilhelm Griitter	South Africa	1973–74 Jakaranda
Alexei Grischenko	Soviet Union	1989–90 Fazisi
Stellan Gross	Sweden	1989–90 The Card
Jack Grout	France	1973–74 Kriter
Ariane Grout	France	1973–74 Kriter
Guido Grugnola	Italy	1981–82 Rollygo
Federico Grunewald	Argentina	1981–82 Bubblegum
Steve Gruver	United States	2001–02 Djuice Dragons
Rodolfo Guerrini	Italy	1993–94 Merit Cup
Michel Guez	France	1977–78 Gauloises II
Dominique Guillet^{†}	France	1973–74 33 Export
Martin Guldner	Germany	1989–90 Schlüssel von Bremen
Serge Guilhamou	France	1989–90 British Satquote Defender
Marc Guillemot	France	1989–90 Charles Jourdan, 1993–94 La Poste
Jean-François Guillet	Switzerland	1989–90 Merit, 1993–94 Merit Cup
Michel Guillot	France	1989–90 La Poste
Christine Guillou	France	1997–98 EF Education
Gabriel Guilly	France	1981–82 Mor Bihan
Zane Gills	Australia	2011–12 Telefónica, 1989–90 Charles Jourdan
Antonio Guiu	Spain	1981–82 Licor 43, 1985–86 Fortuna Lights
Raymond Gumley	Australia	1989–90 NCB Ireland
Sotero Gumerret	Spain	1981–82 Licor 43
Henrik Gummerus	Finland	1989–90 The Card
Jon Gunderson	New Zealand	2001–02 Team News Corp & Team SEB
Simon Gundry	New Zealand	1981–82 Ceramco New Zealand, 1985–86 Lion New Zealand
Fridtjof Gunkel	Germany	1989–90 Schlüssel von Bremen
Jan Gustafsson	Sweden	1985–86 Drum, 1989–90 The Card
Tony Gutteridge	Great Britain	1981–82 United Friendly
Espen Guttormsen	Norway	1997–98 Innovation Kvaerner, 2001–02 Djuice Dragons
Edoardo Guzzetti	Italy	1973–74 Tauranga

== H ==
Sailor	Nationality	Year
Kaj Haagensen	Norway	1981–82 Berge Viking
Petter Hagelund	Norway	1981–82 Berge Viking
Timo Hagoort	Netherlands	2015–16 Team Brunel
Ekhart Hahn	Germany	1981–82 Walross III Berlin
Paul Hailstone	Great Britain	1989–90 With Integrity
Ross Halcrow	New Zealand	1989–90 Fisher & Paykel, 1997–98 Innovation Kvaerner, 2001–02 Illbruck Challenge, 2005–06 Ericsson
Sarah-Jane Hall	Great Britain	1989–90 Creighton's Naturally
Corinna Halloran	United States	2014–15 Team SCA
Jacques Hamelle	France	1977–78 Neptune
Andreas Hanakamp	Austria	2008–09 Kosatka
Brian Hancock	South Africa	1981–82 Outward Bound, 1985–86 Drum, 1989–90 Fazisi
Chris Hancock	Great Britain	1985–86 Drum
Graeme Handley	Great Britain	1985–86 Lion New Zealand, 1989–90 NCB Ireland
Jena Hansen	Denmark	2017–18 Vestas 11th Hour Racing
Bob Hanenberg	Netherlands	1977–78 Tielsa
Philippe Hanin	Belgium	1977–78 Traité de Rome, 1981–82 Traité de Rome
Kim Hanlon	Australia	1981–82 Alaska Eagle
Aran Hansen	New Zealand	1985–86 Lion New Zealand
Bo Hansen	Denmark	1993–94 Intrum Justitia
Klavs Fisher Hansen	Denmark	1985–86 SAS Baia Viking
Fridolf Hanson	United States	1989–90 Martela OF
Chen Jinhao (Horace)	China	2014–15 Dongfeng Race Team, 2017–18 Dongfeng Race Team
Leslie Hardy	Great Britain	1989–90 British Satquote Defender
Ken Hara	Japan	1993–94 Tokio
Harry Harkimo	Finland	1981–82 Skopbank of Finland, 1989–90 Belmont Finland II
Roy Harkimo	Finland	1989–90 Belmont Finland II
Angus Harlow	United States	1993–94 Hetman Sahaidachny
Tony Harman	Australia	1997–98 Chessie Racing
Philip Harmer	Australia	2005–06 Brunel, 2008–09 Green Dragon, 2011–12 Groupama 4, 2014–15 Azzam
Kenneth Harper	Great Britain	1989–90 British Satquote Defender
Kelvin Harrap	New Zealand	1993–94 Tokio, 1997–98 Toshiba, 2011–12 Mar Mostro
John Harris	New Zealand	1989–90 The Card
John Harris	Great Britain	1989–90 Rothmans
Kristin Harris	Great Britain	1989–90 Creighton's Naturally
Philip Harris	New Zealand	1985–86 NZI Enterprise
Stephen Harrison	Australia	1981–82 Flyer II
Ian Hartless	Great Britain	1989–90 Liverpool Enterprise
Christoph Hartogs	Germany	1989–90 Schlüssel von Bremen
Bernt Hartwell	Finland	1981–82 Skopbank of Finland
Chris Harvey	South Africa	1981–82 FCF Challenger
Mick Harvey	Australia	1989–90 Liverpool Enterprise
Sara Hastreiter	United States	2014–15 Team SCA
Stig Hatlo	Norway	1981–82 Berge Viking
Mark Hauser	New Zealand	1985–86 NZI Enterprise, 1989–90 Fazisi, 1993–94 Yamaha
Alain Havelange	Belgium	1981–82 33 Export, 1985–86 Côte d'Or, 1989–90 Fisher & Paykel
Adam Hawkins	Australia	2005–06 Brunel
Eleanor Hay	Great Britain	2001–02 Amer Sports Too
Graeme Haygarth	South Africa	1985–86 Shadow of Switzerland
Steve Hayles	Great Britain	1993–94 Reebok/Dolphin & Youth, 1997–98 Silk Cut, 2001–02 Team Tyco, 2005–06 Ericsson, 2008–09 Green Dragon, 2017–18 Team Sun Hung Kai/Scallywag
F. O. M. J. Hayman	Great Britain	1973–74 British Soldier
J. A. Hearl	Great Britain	1977–78 Adventure
Benoit Hebert	France	1989–90 L'Esprit de Liberté
Richard Heberling	United States	1973–74 33 Export
Peter Heck	United States	1993–94 Tokio
Bill Heffernan	Ireland	1993–94 Fortuna
Martin Hehnn	Germany	1989–90 Schlüssel von Bremen
Roger Heidmann	Germany	1989–90 Schlüssel von Bremen
Frederick Heineman	Germany	1973–74 Peter von Danzig, 1977–78 Traité de Rome
Maximilian Heinemann	Germany	1973–74 Peter von Danzig
Roy Heiner	Netherlands	1997–98 BrunelSunergy, 2001–02 Assa Abloy
Mark Hejl	New Zealand	1981–82 Bubblegum
Palle Hemdorff	Denmark	1981–82 Traité de Rome, 1985–86 Philips Innovator
Jared Henderson	New Zealand	1997–98 America's Challenge & Merit Cup
Keryn Henderson	New Zealand	2001–02 Amer Sports Too
Robin Henderson	Great Britain	1989–90 Creighton's Naturally
George Hendy	New Zealand	1981–82 Flyer II
Harald Hennig	Germany	1989–90 Schlüssel von Bremen
Carl Hennix	Sweden	1989–90 The Card
Andrea Henriquet	Italy	1981–82 Rollygo
Jan Heogland	Netherlands	1977–78 Tielsa
Judith Herbert	Great Britain	1977–78 Traité de Rome
Dean Herbison	Great Britain	1993–94 Odessa
Boris Herrmann	Germany	2020-21 Malizia II, 2024-25 Malizia Seaexplorer
Carlos Hernández	Spain	2014–15 Mapfre
Andreas Hestermann	Germany	1989–90 Schlüssel von Bremen
Richard Hewitt	United States	1993–94 Hetman Sahaidachny
Luc Heymans	Belgium	1981–82 European University Belgium & 33 Export, 1985-86 Côte D'Or, 1989–90 The Card & Charles Jourdan
Stephen Hickey	Ireland	1993–94 Odessa
Russell A. Hide	South Africa	1981–82 Xargo III, 1985–86 Atlantic Privateer
Henri Hiddes	Netherlands	1985–86 Atlantic Privateer, 1989–90 Rothmans
Alex Higby	Great Britain	2014–15 Azzam
A. Higham	Great Britain	1973–74 Adventure
John Higham	Great Britain	1985–86 Philips Innovator
Nancy Hill	Great Britain	1989–90 Maiden
R. A. L. Hill	Great Britain	1973–74 British Soldier
Paul Hindmarch	Great Britain	1989–90 With Integrity
Wendy Hinds	Great Britain	1973–74 Second Life
Frans Hinfelaar	Netherlands	1985–86 Philips Innovator
Daniel Hirsch	France	1985–86 L'Esprit d'équipe
Marc Hodder	Great Britain	1981–82 United Friendly
Erik Hodne	Norway	1981–82 Berge Viking
Jan Hoe	Great Britain	1989–90 British Satquote Defender
Martin Hoetzel	Germany	1989–90 Schlüssel von Bremen
Willemien van Hoeve	Netherlands	2001–02 Amer Sports Too
A. M. Hogton	Great Britain	1973–74 British Soldier
Phil Holland	New Zealand	1985–86 Drum
Mark Hollier	New Zealand	1989–90 Liverpool Enterprise
Edgar Holmes	United States	1989–90 Liverpool Enterprise
Kai-Uwe Hollweg	Germany	1989–90 Schlüssel von Bremen
Alec Honey	Great Britain	1973–74 Great Britain II
Stan Honey	United States	2005–06 ABN Amro I
David Hooper	New Zealand	1993–94 Hetman Sahaidachny
Eddie Hope	Great Britain	1973–74 Great Britain II
Hamish Hooper	New Zealand	2011–12 Camper Lifelovers
Michael Hope	Great Britain	1989–90 Creighton's Naturally
S. Hope	Great Britain	1977–78 Adventure
Bernard Horeau	Seychelles	1981–82 Bubblegum (yacht) & Ilgagomma
Michel Horeau	France	1977–78 33 Export
Hans Horrevoets^{†}	Netherlands	1997–98 BrunelSunergy, 2005–06 ABN Amro II
Bernard Hosking^{†}	Great Britain	1973–74 Great Britain II
Jeffrey Houlgrave	Great Britain	1981–82 United Friendly
Ryan Houston	New Zealand	2008–09 Black Betty, 2011–12 Sanya Lan, 2014–15 Team Alvimedica
Mike Howard	United States	2001–02 Assa Abloy, 2005–06 Movistar
Iain Hudson	Zimbabwe	1985–86 Shadow of Switzerland
Carlo Huisman	Netherlands	2017–18 Team Brunel
Marc van Hulssen	Netherlands	1997–98 BrunelSunergy
Conrad Humphreys	Great Britain	1993–94 Odessa
Matthew Humphries	Great Britain	1989–90 With Integrity, 1993–94 Reebok/Dolphin & Youth, 1997–98 America's Challenge & Swedish Match, 2005–06 Brunel, 2001–02 Team SEB & Team News Corp
David Hurley	New Zealand	1993–94 Winston
John Hutchinson	Canada	1973–74 Sayula II
Terry Hutchinson	United States	2001–02 Djuice Dragons
Timo Huttunen	Finland	1981–82 Skopbank of Finland, 1989–90 Martela OF
Philip Hyde	Great Britain	1981–82 United Friendly
C. P. O. Hyland	Great Britain	1973–74 Adventure

== I ==
Sailor	Nationality	Year
Marcos Iglesias	Spain	1993–94 Galicia '93 Pescanova
Constance Imbert	France	1973–74 CS e RB
Jurg Immobersteg	Switzerland	1985–86 Shadow of Switzerland
Jon Inchaustegui	Spain	1985–86 Fortuna Lights
Pablo Iglesias	Spain	2008–09 Telefónica Black
Martin Ingold	Switzerland	1981–82 Disque d'Or 3
Ludde Ingvall	Finland	1985–86 Atlantic Privateer, 1989–90 Union Bank of Finland
Andrew Irons	Great Britain	1989–90 Creighton's Naturally
Enrique Irveta	Argentina	1989–90 L'Esprit de Liberté
Gordon Irving	Great Britain	1981–82 Bubblegum
Frederic Isabella	Switzerland	1985–86 UBS Switzerland
Peter Isler	United States	2001–02 Team News Corp
Toby Isles	Great Britain	1993–94 Reebok/Dolphin & Youth
Erwan Israel	France	2011–12 Groupama 4, 2014–15 Dongfeng Race Team

== J ==
Sailor	Nationality	Year
Brad Jackson	New Zealand	1993–94 NZ Endeavour
Brad Jackson	New Zealand	1997–98 Merit Cup
Brad Jackson	New Zealand	2001–02 Team Tyco
Brad Jackson	New Zealand	2005–06 ABN Amro I
Brad Jackson	New Zealand	2008–09 Ericsson 4
Brad Jackson	New Zealand	2011–12 Mar Mostro
Robert Jackson	Great Britain	1977–78 ADC Accutrac
Stacey Jackson	Australia	2014–15 Team SCA, 2017–18 Vestas 11th Hour Racing
Grégoire Jacquet	Switzerland	1993–94 Merit Cup
Richard Jakaus	United States	1989–90 Gatorade & Martela & Merit
Stanislaw Jakubczyk	Poland	1973–74 Otago
François Jallat	France	1981–82 Gauloises 3 & Euromarché
Jan Peter Jamaer	Germany	1973–74 Peter von Danzig
Phil James	New Zealand	2008–09 Ericsson International
Rob James	Great Britain	1973–74 Second Life, 1977–78 Great Britain II
Phil Jameson	New Zealand	2008–09 Ericsson 4
Herve Jan	France	1985–86 Shadow of Switzerland
Herve Jan	France	1989–90 Gatorade
Herve Jan	France	1993–94 Brooksfield
Herve Jan	France	1997–98 BrunelSunergy
Herve Jan	France	2001–02 Assa Abloy
Roger Janes	Australia	1981–82 Flyer II
Per Jangen	Sweden	1973–74 Keewaydin
Dieter Janssens	Belgium	1989–90 With Integrity
David Jarvis	Great Britain	2001–02 Djuice Dragons
Gaston Jaunsolo	Uruguay	1993–94 Uruguay Natural
Jorge Jaunsolo	Uruguay	1993–94 Uruguay Natural
Grant Jenkins	New Zealand	1985–86 NZI Enterprise
Jan Jensen	Norway	1981–82 Berge Viking
Kerstin Jensen	Sweden	1973–74 Keewaydin
Nils-Arne Jensen	Sweden	1973–74 Keewaydin
Pierre Baad Jensen	Denmark	1985–86 Philips Innovator
Yang Jiru (Wolf)	China	2014–15 Dongfeng Race Team
Thomas Johanson	Finland	2008–09 Ericsson 3, 2011–12 Mar Mostro
Christian Horn Johansson	Norway	1997–98 Innovation Kvaerner
Christian Horn Johansson	Norway	2001–02 Djuice Dragons
Berndt Johansson	Finland	1989–90 Martela OF
Jorgen Krogh Johansen	Denmark	1985–86 SAS Baia Viking
Tim Johnson	Great Britain	1981–82 United Friendly
Tom Johnson	Australia	2014–15 Team Vestas Wind, 2017–18 Vestas 11th Hour Racing
William Johnson	United States	1977–78 Flyer
A. Johnstone	Great Britain	1973–74 Adventure
Ben Jones	Australia	2005–06 Brunel
Ian Jones	Great Britain	1977–78 Heath's Condor
Elizabeth Jones	Great Britain	1989–90 With Integrity
Louis Jones	New Zealand	1989–90 Fisher & Paykel
Warwick Jones	New Zealand	1981–82 FCF Challenger
Hanne Jorgensen	Denmark	1985–86 SAS Baia Viking
Bengt Jörnstedt	Sweden	1981–82 Swedish Entry
Michael Joubert	South Africa	1997–98 BrunelSunergy, 2001–02 Assa Abloy, 2005–06 Movistar, 2008–09 Kosatka
John Jourdane	United States	1985–86 NZI Enterprise, 1989–90 Fisher & Paykel
Roland Jourdain	France	1985–86 Côte d'Or, 1989–90 Fazisi
Sebastien Josse	France	2005–06 ABN Amro II
Etienne Julien	France	1981–82 Gauloises 3 & Mor Bihan
Tom Jungell	Finland	1989–90 Union Bank of Finland
Bridget Juniper	Great Britain	1985–86 Norsk Data GB

== K ==
Sailor	Nationality	Year
Niels Kaae	Denmark	1985–86 Philips Innovator & SAS Baia Viking
Vesa Kaipanen	Finland	1989–90 Belmont Finland II
Eero Kairamo	Finland	1989–90 Martela OF
Erkki Kairamo	Finland	1989–90 Martela OF
Viktor Kamkin	Soviet Union	1989–90 Fazisi
Oscar Karlsson	Sweden	1997–98 Swedish Match
Susan Kavanagh	Ireland	1985–86 Norsk Data GB
Hans Kawerau	Germany	1981–82 Walross III Berlin
J. S. Kay	Great Britain	1977–78 Adventure
Larry Keating	New Zealand	1989–90 NCB Ireland
Rodney Keenan	New Zealand	2001–02 Team SEB
Michael Keeton	New Zealand	1981–82 Outward Bound, 1985–86 NZI Enterprise
Kester Keighley	Great Britain	1989–90 Creighton's Naturally
M. W. Kemmis-Betty	Great Britain	1977–78 Adventure
Graham Kendall	New Zealand	1985–86 NZI Enterprise
David Kenny	Great Britain	1985–86 Norsk Data GB
Gael de Kerangat	France	1981–82 Gauloises 3, 1989–90 Charles Jourdan
Coenraad Kerbert	Netherlands	1985–86 Philips Innovator
Olivier Kerkhofs	Belgium	1981–82 European University Belgium, 1985–86 Côte d'Or, 1989–90 Equity & Law II
Jacques Kermoal	France	1989–90 La Poste
Marc Kerry	Great Britain	1977–78 Great Britain II
Olivier de Kersauson	France	1973–74 Pen Duick VI
Timothy A. Kershaw	Great Britain	1973–74 Second Life
Martin Keruzoré	France	2017–18 On-board reporter
Glenn Kessels	Great Britain	1993–94 Reebok/Dolphin & Youth, 2001–02 Team SEB
Jere Keurulainen	Finland	1989–90 Belmont Finland II
Jack Keyhoe	United States	1977–78 Heath's Condor
Adil Khalid	United Arab Emirates	2011–12 Azzam, 2014–15 Azzam
Andrew Kidd	New Zealand	1989–90 Liverpool Enterprise
Marie-Claude Kieffer	France	1993–94 Heineken, 1997–98 EF Education
Anne Kierulf	Denmark	1985–86 SAS Baia Viking
Keith Kilpatrick	United States	2001–02 Amer Sports One
Nigel King	Great Britain	2001–02 Team News Corp
Simon King	Great Britain	1989–90 Creighton's Naturally
A. W. King-Harman	Great Britain	1973–74 Second Life
R. Kingsnorth	Great Britain	1973–74 Adventure
Jerry Kirby	United States	1997–98 Chessie Racing, 2005–06 Pirates of the Caribbean, 2008–09 Il Mostro
Rome Kirby	United States	2011–12 Mar Mostro
S. R. Kirby	Great Britain	1977–78 Adventure
Dietrich Kirchner	Germany	1989–90 Schlüssel von Bremen
Martin Kirketerp	Denmark	2011–12 Sanya Lan
J. Kiszely	Great Britain	1977–78 Adventure
Bernd Klatte	Germany	1989–90 Schlüssel von Bremen
Michel Kleinjans	Belgium	1985–86 Rucanor TriStar
Peter Klock	Sweden	1989–90 The Card
R. J. Knox	Great Britain	1973–74 British Soldier
Matt Knighton	United States	2014–15 Azzam
Robin Knox-Johnston	Great Britain	1977–78 Heath's Condor
Bernd Knuppel	Uruguay	1993–94 Uruguay Natural
Peter Koehurst	South Africa	1973–74 Jakaranda
Frits Koek	Netherlands	1997–98 BrunelSunergy, 2008–09 Black Betty
Edgar Koekebakker	Netherlands	1977–78 Flyer, 1981–82 Flyer II
Nicolas Koetschau	Germany	1989–90 Schlüssel von Bremen
Tony Kolb	Germany	2001–02 Illbruck Challenge, 2005–06 Ericsson
Morten Kolflaath	Norway	1981–82 Berge Viking
Wilfried Kollex	Germany	1973–74 Peter von Danzig
Kazunori Komatsu	Japan	1993–94 Yamaha
Gennadiy Korolkov	Soviet Union	1989–90 Fazisi, 1993–94 Odessa
Paavo Korpikuusi	Finland	1989–90 Martela OF
John Kostecki	United States	1997–98 Chessie Racing, 2001–02 Illbruck Challenge, 2005–06 Ericsson
Ivan Kostyuchenko	Ukraine	1993–94 Hetman Sahaidachny
Roberto Kramar	Italy	1981–82 Vivanapoli
Gunnar Krantz	Sweden	1989–90 The Card, 1993–94 Intrum Justitia & Tokio, 1997–98 Swedish Match, 2001–02 Team SEB
Martin Krite	Sweden	2008–09 Ericsson 3, 2011–12 Groupama 4
Tim Kroger	Germany	1993–94 Intrum Justitia, 1997–98 Swedish Match
Arno Kronenberg	Germany	1989–90 Schlüssel von Bremen
Philippe Kropf	Switzerland	1985–86 UBS Switzerland
Wim Krosenbrink	Netherlands	1997–98 BrunelSunergy
Vladimir Kulinichenko	Soviet Union	1989–90 Fazisi, 1993–94 Odessa & Hetman Sahaidachny
Kazimierz Kurzydlo	Poland	1973–74 Otago
Mikaela von Kuskull	Finland	1989–90 Maiden, 1993–94 Heineken
Wilhelm von Kuskull	Finland	1981–82 Swedish Entry, 1985–86 Fazer Finland
Igor Kutorkin	Ukraine	1993–94 Odessa
Edward W. Kuttel	South Africa	1985–86 Atlantic Privateer
Mike Kuttel	South Africa	1981–82 Xargo III
Peter Kuttel	South Africa	1981–82 Xargo III, 1985–86 Atlantic Privateer
Peter John Kuttel	South Africa	1985–86 Atlantic Privateer
Robert Kwekkeboom	Netherlands	1977–78 Tielsa

== L ==
Sailor	Nationality	Year
Alain Labbe	France	1977–78 Gauloises II
Jean Pierre Labbe	France	1977–78 Gauloises II
Dominique Lacroix	France	1977–78 Neptune
Luciano Ladavas	Italy	1973–74 Guia
Colin Ladd	Great Britain	1977–78 Debenhams
Jean-Jacques Laeser	Switzerland	1981–82 Disque d'Or 3
Jacques Laine	France	1981–82 Charles Heidsieck III & Euromarché
Hughes Lallement	France	1973–74 Kriter
Maxime Laloux	France	1977–78 33 Export
Torsti Lammi	Finland	1989–90 Union Bank of Finland
Cameron Lanceley	Australia	1981–82 Xargo III
Claus Landmark	Norway	1981–82 Berge Viking, 1989–90 The Card
Jon Landmark	Norway	1981–82 Berge Viking
Santiago Lange	Argentina	2001–02 Team SEB, 2008–09 Telefónica Black
Jon Langeland	Norway	1981–82 Berge Viking
Kyle Langford	Australia	2017–18 Team Brunel
Henrik Langhoff	Finland	1989–90 Union Bank of Finland
Chris Larson	United States	2001–02 Assa Abloy
Börje Larsson	Sweden	1989–90 The Card
Lage Larsson	Sweden	1989–90 The Card
Yngve Larsson	Norway	1981–82 Berge Viking
Bruno La Salle	France	1973–74 33 Export
Pascal Lassus	France	1989–90 La Poste
Gerhard Last	South Africa	1973–74 Jakaranda
Sergei Lastouetski	Ukraine	1993–94 Odessa
Koemraad Lasure	Belgium	1985–86 Rucanor TriStar
Julio Lattes	Italy	1977–78 B&B Italia
Monique Lattes	Italy	1977–78 B&B Italia
Reinhard Laucht	Germany	1973–74 Peter von Danzig
Marcel Laurin	France	1977–78 Flyer
Bernard Lauvray	France	1973–74 Kriter
Jean-Dominique Lavanchy	Switzerland	1993–94 Merit Cup
James Lavery	Great Britain	1989–90 Creighton's Naturally
Alexey Lavrenov	Ukraine	1993–94 Odessa
Kendal Law	Great Britain	1985–86 NZI Enterprise
Matthew Lawrence	United States	1981–82 Swedish Entry
T. Laycock	Great Britain	1973–74 Adventure
Dr. Robin Leach	Great Britain	1973–74 Second Life
Gianfrancesco Leati	Italy	1981–82 Ilgagomma
Michel le Berre	France	1973–74 Pen Duick VI
Bernard Le Boette	France	1981–82 Gauloises 3
Pierre Leboutet	France	1973–74 Pen Duick VI
Yves Lebouvier	France	1989–90 L'Esprit de Liberté
Jonathan Le Bon	Great Britain	1989–90 NCB Ireland
Simon Le Bon	Great Britain	1985–86 Drum
Yves Leblevec	France	2005–06 ABN Amro II
Jean Le Cam	France	1981–82 Euromarché
François Le Castrec	France	1993–94 La Poste
Jérémie Lecaudey	France	2017–18 On-board reporter
Frederick Leclere	France	1981–82 Bubblegum, 1985–86 L'Esprit d'équipe
Yves Le Cornec	France	1981–82 Euromarché, 1989–90 Charles Jourdan
Eric Lecotteley	France	1985–86 L'Esprit d'équipe
Jose Le Deliou	France	1973–74 33 Export
Thierry Ledoux	France	1981–82 Gauloises 3
Malcolm Lee	Great Britain	1989–90 Rothmans
Thibault Le Fournier	France	1977–78 33 Export, 1981–82 33 Export
Yves Le Gad	France	1981–82 Gauloises 3
Christophe Le Garff	France	1981–82 Mor Bihan
Max Le Grand	Great Britain	1977–78 Great Britain II
Eero Lehtinen	Finland	1989–90 The Card
Tapio Lehtinen	Finland	1981–82 Skopbank of Finland
Jean Le Huerou-Kerisel	France	1989–90 L'Esprit de Liberté
Abram Leibovich	Soviet Union	1989–90 Fazisi
J. R. Le Maitre	Great Britain	1973–74 British Soldier
Jean Le Menec	France	1981–82 Mor Bihan
Yann Le Nabour	France	1981–82 Euromarché
Stephen Lenartowicz	Great Britain	1977–78 Debenhams
Philippe Lengaigne	France	1977–78 Neptune
Pierre Lenormand	France	1973–74 Kriter
Eric Lenz	Belgium	1981–82 European University of Belgium
Jean Bernard Leonarde	France	1977–78 Japy-Hermés
Johan Lepoutre	Belgium	1981–82 European University Belgium
David A. Leslie	Great Britain	1973–74 British Soldier, 1977–78 Adventure
I. S. Leslie	Great Britain	1977–78 Adventure
Eric Letrosne	France	1977–78 33 Export, 1981–82 Charles Heidsieck III
Claude Letz	France	1977–78 Japy-Hermés
Anders Lewander	Sweden	2008–09 Ericsson 3
Hardley Lewin	Jamaica	1989–90 With Integrity
M. Lewin-Harris	Great Britain	1973–74 British Soldier
Andrew Lewis	United States	2005–06 ABN Amro II, 2011–12 Azzam
Cameron Lewis	United States	1997–98 Innovation Kvaerner
Nicholas Lewis	Great Britain	1981–82 Xargo III
Gustavo Lie	Norway	1981–82 Berge Viking
Håkon Lie	Norway	1981–82 Berge Viking
Edward van Lierde	Netherlands	2005–06 Brunel, 2008–09 Black Betty
Xue-Liu (Black)	China	2014–15 Donfeng Race Team, 2017–18 Dongfeng Race Team
Jan-Erik Lindgren	Sweden	1973–74 Keewaydin
Carl-Johan Lindholm	Finland	1985–86 Fazer Finland
Vanessa Linsley	United States	1993–94 Heineken
Anders Lilius	Finland	1989–90 Belmont Finland II
Carl Lindfors	Finland	1989–90 Belmont Finland II
Ann Lippens	Belgium	1981–82 Croky, 1985–86 Rucanor TriStar
William Lippens	Belgium	1981–82 Croky
R. J. Little	Great Britain	1973–74 British Soldier
Eugeno Llamas	Spain	1985–86 Fortuna Lights
Nicolas Loday	France	1977–78 Gauloises II
Andre Loepfe	Switzerland	1989–90 Merit, 1993–94 Merit Cup
Eric Loizeau	France	1977–78 Gauloises II, 1981–82 Gauloises 3
Alessandro Lojacono	Italy	1973–74 CS e RB
Francisclis Lokin	Netherlands	1985–86 Philips Innovator
Rutgerus Lokin	Netherlands	1989–90 Equity & Law II
Jeremy Lomas	New Zealand	1997–98 Merit Cup
L. S. J. Long	Great Britain	1973–74 Adventure
Fransesco Longanesi Cattani	Italy	1973–74 CS e RB
Fredrik Lööf	Sweden	2001–02 Amer Sports One, 2005–06 Pirates of the Caribbean
Edmundo Lopez	Uruguay	1989–90 Liverpool Enterprise
Gabriel Lopez	Uruguay	1989–90 Fortuna Extra Lights, 1993–94 Uruguay Natural
Pelayo Lopez de Merlo	Spain	1989–90 Fortuna Extra Lights
Hector Lopez Piqueras	Spain	1985–86 Fortuna Lights, 1989–90 Fortuna Extra Lights
Miguel Lopez Piqueras	Spain	1985–86 Fortuna Lights, 1989–90 Fortuna Extra Lights
Christopher A. J. Lord	Great Britain	1973–74 Second Life
Keith Lorence	United States	1973–74 Sayula II
Claude Lovera	France	1981–82 Charles Heidsieck III
Philip Lovett	Great Britain	1985–86 Norsk Data GB
Marc Lubken	Great Britain	1981–82 Traité de Rome
Ralph Lucas	New Zealand	1985–86 Lion New Zealand
Joachin Lucht	Germany	1981–82 Walross III Berlin
Rolf Luecke	Germany	1989–90 Schlüssel von Bremen
Pleun van der Lugt	Netherlands	1985–86 Equity & Law
Rodion Luka	Ukraine	2008–09 Kosatka
Mikael Lundh	Sweden	1997–98 Swedish Match, 2001–02 Djuice Dragons
Henrik Lundberg	Finland	1989–90 Union Bank of Finland
Bertil Lundin	Sweden	1973–74 Keewaydin
Peder Lunde Jr.	Norway	1981–82 Berge Viking
Benedicte Lunven	France	1977–78 Japy-Hermés
Bruno Lunven	France	1973–74 Grand Louis
Nicolas Lunven	France	2014–15 Mapfre, 2017–18 Turn the Tide on Plastic, 2023 Team Malizia
Thierry Lunven	France	1977–78 Japy-Hermés & 33 Export
Annie Lush	Great Britain	2014–15 Team SCA, 2017–18 Team Brunel
Jim Lutz	United States	1985–86 Atlantic Privateer, 1989–90 Liverpool Enterprise
Brendan Lyne	Ireland	1985–86 Equity & Law

== M ==
Sailor	Nationality	Year
Halvard Mabire	France	1981–82 Mor Bihan
Halvard Mabire	France	1985–86 Côte d'Or
Halvard Mabire	France	1989–90 Belmont Finland II
Halvard Mabire	France	1993–94 La Poste
Halvard Mabire	France	1997–98 America's Challenge
Richard Macalister	New Zealand	1981–82 Ceramco New Zealand
François Mach	Switzerland	1985–86 UBS Switzerland, 1993–94 Merit Cup
Paul MacDonald	New Zealand	1985–86 Lion New Zealand
Ross MacDonald	Canada	1997–98 Toshiba
Corin Mackenzie	Great Britain	1989–90 Creighton's Naturally, 1993–94 Odessa
Volker Mackeprang	Germany	1973–74 Peter von Danzig
Tom Macsweeney	Ireland	1989–90 NCB Ireland
Patrice Madillac	France	1973–74 Pen Duick VI
Edward Maertens	Belgium	1985–86 Rucanor TriStar
Massimo Maffezzini	Italy	1981–82 La Barca Laboratorio
Aksel Magdahl	Norway	2008–09 Ericsson 3, 2011–12 Sanya Lan
Gordon Maguire	Ireland	1989–90 Rothmans
Gordon Maguire	Ireland	1993–94 Winston
Gordon Maguire	Ireland	1997–98 Silk Cut
Gordon Maguire	Ireland	2001–02 Team News Corp
Fredy Mahlstedt	Germany	1989–90 Schlüssel von Bremen
Stefano Maida	Italy	1981–82 Rollygo & Ilgagomma, 1989–90 Gatorade
Sergei Maidan	Ukraine	1993–94 Hetman Sahaidachny
Chris Main	New Zealand	2008–09 Green Dragon, 2011–12 Sanya Lan
Guido Maisto	Italy	1989–90 Gatorade, 1993–94 Brooksfield, 1997–98 Merit Cup
A. Malcolmson	Great Britain	1977–78 Adventure
Philippe Maleszewski	Switzerland	1989–90 Merit
Carla Malingri	Italy	1973–74 CS e RB
Franco Malingri	Italy	1973–74 CS e RB
Doi Malingri di Bagnolo	Italy	1973–74 CS e RB, 1981–82 Save Venice
Michel Malinovsky	France	1973–74 Kriter
François Mallard	France	1981–82 Ilgagomma
Daniel Malle	France	1989–90 La Poste, 1993–94 La Poste
Kirk Mandt	Germany	1989–90 Schlüssel von Bremen
Marjorie Mann	Great Britain	1989–90 Creighton's Naturally
Markos Mannstrom	Finland	1989–90 Union Bank of Finland
Ewout Mante	Netherlands	1985–86 Equity & Law
A. R. Manton	Great Britain	1977–78 Adventure & Great Britain II
Stephane Marcelli	France	1985–86 Côte d'Or
Anthony Marchand	France	2014–15 Mapfre
Jacopo Marchi	Italy	1981–82 Rollygo, 1989–90 Gatorade
Michel Marie	France	1989–90 Rucanor Sport
Jaime Marina	Australia	1989–90 Fisher & Paykel
Brad Marsh	Great Britain	2011–12 Groupama 4
G. S. Marshall	Great Britain	1973–74 British Soldier
Olivier Marthe	Switzerland	1985–86 UBS Switzerland, 1989–90 Merit
Isidro Marti	Spain	1985–86 Fortuna Lights
Ian Martin	South Africa	1985–86 Atlantic Privateer
John Martin	South Africa	1985–86 Atlantic Privateer
Robert C. Martin	United States	1973–74 Sayula II
Paolo Martinoni	Italy	1977–78 B&B Italia, 1981–82 Rollygo
Sebastien Marsset	France	2014–15 Team Alvimedica
Iker Martínez de Lizarduy	Spain	2008–09 Telefónica Blue
Iker Martínez de Lizarduy	Spain	2011–12 Telefónica
Iker Martínez de Lizarduy	Spain	2014–15 Mapfre
Pascal Marty	France	1977–78 Neptune & 33 Export
Pierre Mas	France	1993–94 Intrum Justitia, 1997–98 Innovation Kvaerner
Paolo Mascheroni	Italy	1973–74 CS e RB
Christian Masilge	Germany	1981–82 Walross III Berlin
Matt Mason	New Zealand	1993–94 Winston
Michael Mason	Great Britain	1981–82 FCF Challenger
Richard Mason	New Zealand	2001–02 Assa Abloy
Richard Mason	New Zealand	2005–06 Ericsson
Richard Mason	New Zealand	2008–09 Ericsson 3
Richard Mason	New Zealand	2011–12 Sanya Lan
Roy Mason	New Zealand	1985–86 Lion New Zealand
Kaori Matsunaga	Japan	1993–94 Heineken
David Matthews	United States	1989–90 Fazisi
M. Matthews	Great Britain	1973–74 Adventure
Michael Matthiesen	Germany	1989–90 Schlüssel von Bremen
Aimo Mattila	Finland	1981–82 Skopbank of Finland
Zivko Matutinovic	Croatia	1993–94 Hetman Sahaidachny
Carlo Mauri	Italy	1973–74 CS e RB
Serge Maurin	France	1985–86 L'Esprit d'équipe
Christopher Mayers	Great Britain	1981–82 United Friendly
Frazer Maxwell	New Zealand	1985–86 Lion New Zealand
Jules Mazars	France	2001–02 Assa Abloy
Rafael Mbau	Spain	1981–82 Licor 43
Dick McCann	Great Britain	1977–78 Debenhams
TA McCann	United States	1993–94 Tokio
Monica McCants	United States	1981–82 FCF Challenger
Robert McCarthy	Ireland	1989–90 NCB Ireland
Mark McCloskey	United States	1981–82 Alaska Eagle
Fiona McCorkindale	New Zealand	1989–90 With Integrity
Lisa McDonald	United States	1997–98 EF Education, 2001–02 Amer Sports Too
Neal McDonald	Great Britain	1993–94 Fortuna
Neal McDonald	Great Britain	1997–98 Silk Cut
Neal McDonald	Great Britain	2001–02 Assa Abloy
Neal McDonald	Great Britain	2005–06 Ericsson
Neal McDonald	Great Britain	2008–09 Green Dragon
Neal McDonald	Great Britain	2011–12 Telefónica, 2014–15 Azzam
Phil McDonald	Great Britain	1985–86 Norsk Data GB
Andrew McLean	New Zealand	2008–09 Green Dragon, 2011–12 Camper Lifelovers
Tom McWilliam	Ireland	2005–06 Ericsson
Malcolm McEwen	Great Britain	1989–90 Creighton's Naturally
D. J. McGilp	Great Britain	1977–78 Adventure
Ian McGowan-Fyfe	Great Britain	1981–82 Bubblegum
Barry McKay	New Zealand	1989–90 Steinlager 2
Charles McKee	United States	1977–78 King's Legend
Jonathan McKee	United States	2008–09 Il Mostro
David McLoughlin	Ireland	1989–90 Liverpool Enterprise
Keryn McMaster	New Zealand	1997–98 EF Education
John McMullen	Australia	1993–94 Hetman Sahaidachny
Richard Meacham	New Zealand	2001–02 Team Tyco
Andre Mechelynck	Belgium	1985–86 Côte d'Or, 1989–90 Charles Jourdan
Michele Meda	Italy	1973–74 CS e RB
Eduardo Medina	Uruguay	1993–94 Uruguay Natural
Renee Mehl	United States	1993–94 Heineken
Ingo Meier	Germany	1981–82 Xargo III
Andrew Meiklejohn	New Zealand	2005–06 Brasil1, 2011–12 Sanya Lan
Eivind Melleby	Norway	2008–09 Ericsson 3
Frederico Melo	Portugal	2017–18 Turn the Tide on Plastic
Marina Menghi	Italy	1981–82 Vivanapoli
Barry Mercer	Great Britain	1989–90 Creighton's Naturally
Anthony Merrington	Australia	2001–02 Team SEB, 2005–06 Pirates of the Caribbean, 2008–09 Green Dragon
Peter Merrington	Australia	2001–02 Djuice Dragons
Miranda Merron	Great Britain	2001–02 Amer Sports Too
Torsten Messer	Germany	1989–90 Schlüssel von Bremen
Gideon Messink	Netherlands	1985–86 Philips Innovator, 1989–90 Equity & Law II, 1997–98 BrunelSunergy
Peter Metcalfe	Ireland	1985–86 Equity & Law, 1989–90 The Card
Elodie-Jane Mettraux	Switzerland	2014–15 Team SCA, 2017–18 Turn the Tide on Plastic
Justine Mettraux	Switzerland	2014–15 Team SCA
Patrick Meulemeester	France	1973–74 Pen Duick VI
Achim Meyer	Germany	1973–74 Peter von Danzig
Jurgen Meyer	Germany	1973–74 Peter von Danzig
Angelo Mezzanotte	Italy	1977–78 B&B Italia
Karl-Eckart Michael	Germany	1989–90 Schlüssel von Bremen
Adam Michel	Poland	1973–74 Otago
Olaf Michel	Germany	1981–82 Walross III Berlin
Pierre Michetti	Switzerland	1989–90 Merit, 1993–94 Merit Cup
Mikhail Mikhailov	Russia	1993–94 Odessa
Julian Miles	Great Britain	1989–90 Creighton's Naturally
Simon Miles	Great Britain	1989–90 Creighton's Naturally
Rokas Milevičius	Lithuania	2014–15 Team Brunel
Alastair Mill	Great Britain	1985–86 Equity & Law
Scott Miller	Great Britain	2008–09 Green Dragon
Daniel Millet	France	1973–74 33 Export
Jean Pierre Millet	France	1973–74 33 Export
Nicholas Milligan	Great Britain	1977–78 ADC Accutrac
A. R. Mills	Great Britain	1977–78 Adventure
Gian Milone	Italy	1989–90 Gatorade
Adam Minoprio	New Zealand	2011–12 Camper Lifelovers, 2015–16 Team Brunel
Igor Mironenko	Soviet Union	1989–90 Fazisi
I. Miskelly	Great Britain	1977–78 Adventure
Gerard Mitchell	Great Britain	1993–94 Reebok/Dolphin & Youth, 1997–98 Silk Cut, 2001–02 Team Tyco
Marco Mo	Italy	1981–82 La Barca Laboratorio
Vincent Moeyersoms	Belgium	1981–82 Traité de Rome & European University of Belgium
Sten-Erik Molander	Finland	1985–86 Shadow of Switzerland, 1989–90 Union Bank of Finland
Luke Molloy	Australia	2005–06 ABN Amro II, 2017–18 team AkzoNobel
Stuart Molloy	New Zealand	2008–09 Black Betty
Nick Moloney	Australia	1997–98 Toshiba
Bleddyn Mon	Great Britain	2017–18 Turn the Tide on Plastic
Philippe Monnet	France	1981–82 Vivanapoli
Pierre Monsaingeon	France	1973–74 Pen Duick VI
Ross Monson	Great Britain	2017–18 team AkzoNobel
Antonio Cuervas-Mons	Spain	2008–09 Telefónica Black, 2011–12 Telefónica, 2014–15 Mapfre, 2017–18 Mapfre
Michel Monseu	Belgium	1985–86 Côte d'Or
Christina Monti	Italy	1973–74 CS e RB
Jean Claude Montesinos	France	1973–74 Kriter
Wade Morgan	Australia	2011–12 Azzam
Graham Moody	Great Britain	1989–90 Creighton's Naturally
Martin Moody	Great Britain	1989–90 Creighton's Naturally
Ian Moore	Ireland	2001–02 Illbruck Challenge, 2008–09 Green Dragon
A. J. Moore	Great Britain	1977–78 Adventure
T. W. Moore	Great Britain	1973–74 Burton Cutter
Jose Mora	Spain	1981–82 Licor 43
Fortunato Moratto	Italy	1993–94 Brooksfield
Richard Morgan	Great Britain	1981–82 Traité de Rome
V. C. Morgan	Great Britain	1977–78 Adventure
Gustav Morin	Sweden	2008–09 Ericsson 3
Marco Morrosini	Italy	1981–82 La Barca Laboratorio
Julian Morris	Great Britain	1989–90 Creighton's Naturally
Robert Morris	New Zealand	1989–90 With Integrity
Timothy Morris	Great Britain	1989–90 British Satquote Defender
Vernon Morris	Great Britain	1989–90 Creighton's Naturally
Reiner Moritz	Germany	1989–90 Schlüssel von Bremen
Stafford Morse	United States	1977–78 Debenhams
Kym 'Shag' Morton	Australia	1985–86 Atlantic Privateer, 1989–90 Rothmans, 1993–94 Fortuna
Christopher Moselen	New Zealand	1977–78 Flyer
Anthony Moss	Great Britain	1989–90 With Integrity
Paul Mothe	France	1977–78 33 Export
Nicholas Mott	Great Britain	1981–82 United Friendly
W. B. Moulsdale	Great Britain	1973–74 Second Life
Michi Mueller	Germany	2008–09 Il Mostro, 2011–12 Mar Mostro
C. P. O. R. Mullender	Great Britain	1973–74 Adventure
Jorg Muller	Germany	1989–90 Schlüssel von Bremen
Peter Muller	Switzerland	1981–82 Disque d'Or
Stefan Muller	Germany	1989–90 Schlüssel von Bremen
Aki Muller-Deile	Germany	1973–74 Peter von Danzig
Claus Muller-Rohlck	Germany	1989–90 Schlüssel von Bremen
Harm Muller-Rohlck	Germany	1989–90 Schlüssel von Bremen
P. Mumford	Great Britain	1977–78 Adventure
David Munday	New Zealand	1993–94 Reebok/Dolphin & Youth
Jeni Mundy	Great Britain	1989–90 Maiden, 1993–94 Heineken
Fernando Munoz	Spain	1981–82 Licor 43, 1989–90 Fortuna Extra Lights
Annalise Murphy	Ireland	2017–18 Turn the Tide on Plastic
Christine Murphy	New Zealand	1989–90 With Integrity
David Murden	Great Britain	1989–90 Liverpool Enterprise
Christopher Murdoch	Great Britain	1989–90 Creighton's Naturally
Vladislav Murnikov	Soviet Union	1989–90 Fazisi
Paul Murray	New Zealand	1997–98 EF Language
Simon Murray Smith	New Zealand	1981–82 United Friendly
Vladimir Musatov	Ukraine	1993–94 Hetman Sahaidachny
Markus Mustelin	Finland	1985–86 Fazer Finland, 1989–90 Union Bank of Finland, 1993–94 Intrum Justitia
Tony Mutter	New Zealand	1997–98 Swedish Match
Tony Mutter	New Zealand	2001–02 Team SEB
Tony Mutter	New Zealand	2005–06 ABN Amro I
Tony Mutter	New Zealand	2008–09 Ericsson 4
Tony Mutter	New Zealand	2011–12 Mar Mostro
Tony Mutter	New Zealand	2017–18 Vestas 11th Hour Racing
James Myatt	Great Britain	1973–74 British Soldier
Kjell Myrann	Norway	1981–82 Berge Viking
Stefan Myralf	Denmark	2008–09 Ericsson 3

== N ==
Sailor	Nationality	Year
Jeffrey Nadler	United States	1985–86 Philips Innovator
Emily Nagel	Bermuda	2017–18 team AkzoNobel
Robbie Naismith	New Zealand	1989–90 NCB Ireland, 1993–94 Yamaha, 1997–98 Innovation Kvaerner, 2008–09 Il Mostro
Antonio Nappi	Italy	1981–82 Vivanapoli
Andrew Nash	Zimbabwe	1993–94 Fortuna
Dirk Nauta	Netherlands	1977–78 Tielsa, 1985–86 Philips Innovator, 1989–90 Equity & Law II
J. Nebout	France	1973–74 Pen Duick III
Jan Neergaard	Denmark	2008–09 Ericsson 3
Jean-Luc Nelias	France	3008-09 Green Dragon, 2011–12 Groupama 4, 2014–15 Mapfre
N. Netherclift	Great Britain	1973–74 Adventure
Paul Newall	Great Britain	1985–86 Philips Innovator, 1989–90 Equity & Law II
Leah Newbold	New Zealand	1993–94 Heineken, 1997–98 EF Education
John Newton	New Zealand	1981–82 Ceramco New Zealand
Jens Nickel	Germany	1989–90 Schlüssel von Bremen
Christopher Nichol	Great Britain	1989–90 With Integrity
Nick Nichols	United States	1993–94 Odessa
Chris Nicholson	Australia	2001–02 Amer Sports One, 2005–06 Movistar, 2008–09 Il Mostro, 2011–12 Camper Lifelovers, 2014–15 Team Vestas Wind, 2017–18 team AkzoNobel
Anthony Nicholson	New Zealand	1985–86 Norsk Data GB
Richard Nicolson	Great Britain	1989–90 British Satquote Defender
Peter van Niekerk	Netherlands	1997–98 BrunelSunergy, 2008–09 Black Betty, 2017–18 team AkzoNobel
Eva J. I. Nielsen	Denmark	1985–86 SAS Baia Viking
Piet van Nieuwenhuyzen	Netherlands	1997–98 BrunelSunergy
Ilpo Nikkari	Finland	1985–86 Fazer Finland, 1989–90 Union Bank of Finland
Roger Nilson	Sweden	1981–82 Alaska Eagle, 1985–86 Drum, 1989–90 The Card, 1993–94 Intrum Justitia, 1997–98 Swedish Match, 2001–02 Amer Sports One, 2008–09 Telefónica Black
Tage Nilsson	Sweden	1973–74 Keewaydin
Phillippe Nobileau	France	1985–86 Norsk Data GB
F. A. de la Noe	France	1973–74 Kriter
Sjerp Noorda Jr.	Netherlands	1989–90 Liverpool Enterprise
Sjerp Noorda Sr.	Netherlands	1977–78 Tielsa
G. Norman	Great Britain	1973–74 Adventure
Ross Norman	Great Britain	1985–86 Norsk Data GB
Thierry Norman	France	1977–78 Gauloises II & Japy-Hermés
Buster Norsk	Denmark	1985–86 SAS Baia Viking
Jesper Norsk	Denmark	1985–86 SAS Baia Viking
Anthony Nossiter	Australia	2001–02 Djuice Dragons, 2011–12 Azzam
Skip Novak	United States	1977–78 King's Legend, 1981–82 Alaska Eagle, 1985–86 Drum, 1989–90 Fazisi
Piter Ntzhegorodtcev	Ukraine	1993–94 Hetman Sahaidachny
Jean-Gabriel Nucci	France	1981–82 Euromarché
Heikki Nukari	Finland	1989–90 Martela OF
Giovanni Nustrini	Italy	1989–90 Gatorade
Lapo Nustrini	Italy	1993–94 Brooksfield
Craig Nutter	Great Britain	1997–98 Silk Cut
Klas Nylöf	Sweden	1997–98 EF Language, 2001–02 Assa Abloy, 2008–09 Ericsson 3

== O ==
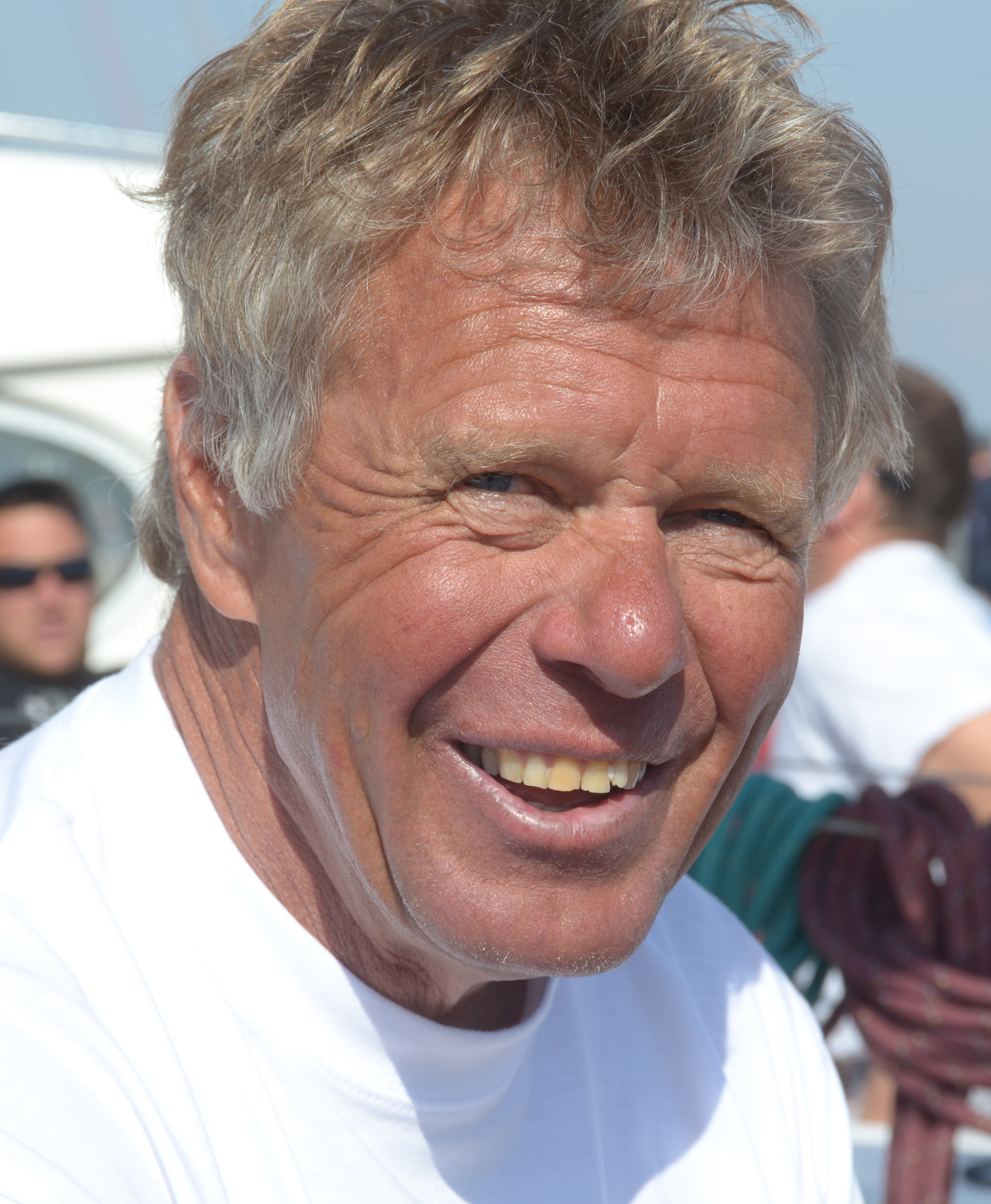
Magnus Olsson participated in six Volvo Ocean Race.

Sailor	Nationality	Year
Patrick O'Brien	Ireland	1989–90 NCB Ireland
Deidre O'Callaghan	Ireland	1989–90 With Integrity
Enda O'Coineen	Ireland	1989–90 With Integrity
Edwin O'Connor	Ireland	2008–09 Black Betty
Ger O'Rourke	Ireland	2008–09 Black Betty
Anders Odelberg	Sweden	1981–82 Swedish Entry
Aldo Oddone	Uruguay	1993–94 Uruguay Natural
Curt Oetking	United States	1997–98 EF Language
Henry Ogando	Uruguay	1993–94 Uruguay Natural
Elizabeth Ogilvy-Wedderburn	Great Britain	1977–78 ADC Accutrac
Jorg-Peter Ohmstedt	Germany	1989–90 Schlüssel von Bremen
Fabio Oliosi	Italy	1981–82 La Barca Laboratorio
Yves Olivaux	France	1973–74 Tauranga
Gabriele Olivo	Italy	2008–09 Telefónica Blue
Göran Olsson	Sweden	1989–90 The Card
Håkan Olsson	Sweden	1973–74 Keewaydin
Magnus Olsson	Sweden	1985–86 Drum, 1989–90 The Card, 1993–94 Intrum Justitia, 1997–98 EF Language, 2001–02 Assa Abloy, 2008–09 Ericsson 3
Michael Olsson	Sweden	1985–86 Drum
S. Omerod	Great Britain	1973–74 Adventure
Mark Orams	New Zealand	1989–90 Steinlager 2
Jochen Orgellmann	Germany	1989–90 Schlüssel von Bremen
Adolfo Orinday	Mexico	1973–74 Sayula II
Antoine Ortholan	France	1981–82 Euromarché
Ties van Os	Netherlands	1985–86 Equity & Law
John Osborne	New Zealand	1989–90 Belmont Finland II
Richard Ott	United States	1993–94 Odessa
Erik Otterstad	Norway	1981–82 Berge Viking
Vladimir Ovtcharenko	Ukraine	1993–94 Odessa
F. Owens	Great Britain	1973–74 Adventure
Will Oxley	Australia	2005–06 Brunel, 2011–12 Camper Lifelovers, 2014–15 Team Alvimedica

== P ==
Sailor	Nationality	Year
Marco Pace	Italy	1981–82 Save Venice
Justin Packshaw	Great Britain	1989–90 British Satquote Defender
Mat Padmos	Netherlands	1977–78 Tielsa
Marina Pagani	Italy	1977–78 B&B Italia
Christian Page	Switzerland	1985–86 UBS Switzerland
Laurent Pages	France	2008–09 Telefónica Blue, 2011–12 Groupama 4, 2014–15 Team Brunel
Corrdo Pahor	Italy	1981–82 Save Venice
Anthony Paine	New Zealand	1981–82 Outward Bound
Marc Pajot	France	1973–74 Pen Duick VI
Eric Pallier	France	1993–94 La Poste
Alfonso Palombo	Italy	1981–82 Vivanapoli
Michael Pammenter	South Africa	2008–09 Telefónica Black, 2011–12 Camper Lifelovers
Beppe Panada	Italy	1981–82 Vivanapoli
Kiny Parade	Switzerland	1997–98 EF Education
Michele Paret	France	1989–90 Maiden, 1993–94 Heineken
David Parish	Great Britain	1989–90 Charles Jourdan
G. S. Parisis	France	1977–78 33 Export
Jeremy Parker	Great Britain	1989–90 Liverpool Enterprise
Nicholas Parker	Great Britain	1989–90 Liverpool Enterprise
Luke Parkinson	Australia	2014–15 Azzam, 2017–18 Team Sun Hung Kai/Scallywag
Mikkel Passabant	Spain	2008–09 Telefónica Black
Marty Pascal	France	1981–82 Charles Heidsieck
Christian Paschen	Germany	1989–90 Schlüssel von Bremen
Erik Pascoli	Italy	1973–74 Tauranga
Zara Pascoli	Italy	1973–74 Tauranga
Dick Pasker	Netherlands	1989–90 Equity & Law II, 1993–94 Uruguay Natural
Mikel Passabant	Spain	2008–09 Telefónica Black
Alberto Passi	Italy	1973–74 CS e RB
Antón Paz	Spain	2008–09 Telefónica Black
M. G. Paterson	Great Britain	1977–78 Adventure
Helmut Paul	Germany	1989–90 Schlüssel von Bremen
Gary Paykel	New Zealand	1989–90 Fisher & Paykel
Nicholas Payne	Great Britain	1989–90 Liverpool Enterprise
Lionel Pean	France	1985–86 L'Esprit d'équipe
Graham Pearson	Great Britain	1977–78 Heath's Condor
William Pearson	United States	1989–90 British Satquote Defender
Nino Pecorari	Italy	1973–74 Guia
Franco Pecorari	Italy	1973–74 Guia
Giorgio Pecorari	Italy	1973–74 Guia
George Peet	United States	2005–06 ABN Amro II
Per Pehle	Germany	1981–82 Walross III Berlin
Álex Pella	Spain	2017–18 team AkzoNobel
David Pella	Spain	2008–09 Black Betty
Mauro Pelaschier	Italy	1993–94 Brooksfield
Henrique Pellicano	Brazil	2005–06 Brasil1
Alvaro Pellistri	Uruguay	1993–94 Uruguay Natural
Daniel Pellistri	Uruguay	1993–94 Uruguay Natural
Philippe Pelsmaeker	France	1977–78 Japy-Hermés
Peter Pendleton	United States	2001–02 Amer Sports One
Austin Perera	Argentina	1981–82 La Barca Laboratorio
Fernando Peres	Brazil	1981–82 La Barca Laboratorio
Michael Perkins	Great Britain	1985–86 Norsk Data GB
Zygfryd Perlicki	Poland	1973–74 Copernicus
Eric Peron	France	2014–15 Dongfeng Race Team
Jean Perraud	France	1989–90 La Poste
Herve Perrin	France	1989–90 Rucanor Sport
Scott Perry	New Zealand	1985–86 Norsk Data GB
Rainer Persch	Germany	1989–90 Schlüssel von Bremen
Roch Pescadere	France	1973–74 33 Export
Robin Peter	Switzerland	1981–82 Disque d'Or 3
Henrik Agner Petersen	Denmark	1985–86 SAS Baia Viking
Pelle Petterson	Sweden	1989–90 The Card
Katherine Pettibone	United States	1997–98 EF Education, 2001–02 Amer Sports Too
Frederic Pey	France	1977–78 Japy-Hermés
Patrick Phelipon	France	1973–74 Pen Duick VI
Thomas Philippe	France	1977–78 33 Export, 1981–82 33 Export
Anthony Phillips^{†}	Great Britain	1989–90 Creighton's Naturally
P. D. Phillips	Great Britain	1973–74 British Soldier
G. C. Philp	Great Britain	1973–74 British Soldier
Dean Phipps	New Zealand	1989–90 Steinlager 2, 1993–94 Winston
J. Phipps	Great Britain	1973–74 British Soldier
Guy Piazzini	Italy	1973–74 Tauranga
Michel Piazzini	Switzerland	1989–90 Merit
Frederic Pichonnat	France	1989–90 L'Esprit de Liberté
Andrew Pickett	Great Britain	1989–90 Liverpool Enterprise
Charles Russell Pickthall	Great Britain	1981–82 Flyer II, 1989–90 Rothmans, 1993–94 Fortuna
Toio Piegieggoli	Italy	1973–74 Guia
Iwona Pienkawa	Poland	1973–74 Otago
Zdzislaw Pienkawa	Poland	1973–74 Otago
Ben Piggott	Australia	2017–18 Team Sun Hung Kai/Scallywag
Dominique Pipat	France	1981–82 Euromarché & Charles Heidsieck III
Baron Joel Piquemal	France	1981–82 Charles Heidsieck III
Jacques Pirlet	Belgium	1981–82 European University of Belgium
Albert Pierrard	Belgium	1989–90 Rucanor Sport
Sebastian Piesse	Australia	1989–90 With Integrity, 1993–94 Odessa
Antonio Piris	Spain	1993–94 Galicia '93 Pescanova, 1997–98 Chessie Racing
Tony Pink	Great Britain	1989–90 Creighton's Naturally, 1993–94 Odessa
Javier de la Plaza	Spain	2008–09 Telefónica Black, 2014–15 Team Brunel
Eugene Platon	Ukraine	1989–90 Fazisi, 1993–94 Hetman Sahaidachny
Matteo Plazzi	Italy	1993–94 Winston
Sander Pluijm	Netherlands	2008–09 Black Betty
Jacques Pochon	France	1977–78 Traité de Rome
Denis Poffet	Switzerland	1985–86 UBS Switzerland
Viktor Pogrebnov	Soviet Union	1989–90 Fazisi
Ray Pogson	Great Britain	1981–82 FCF Challenger
Wilfrid Polome	Belgium	1981–82 Traité de Rome
J. Pommaret	France	1973–74 Pen Duick III
Jerome Poncet	France	1973–74 Guia, 1981–82 Rollygo
Gerd Jan Poortman	Netherlands	2005–06 ABN Amro II, 2008–09 Black Betty, 2014–15 Team Brunel
Marcelo Porta	Uruguay	1993–94 Uruguay Natural
Bill Porter	Great Britain	1973–74 Adventure, 1977–78 King's Legend
Santiago Portillo	Spain	1993–94 Galicia '93 Pescanova
Strempel Portillo	Spain	1989–90 Fortuna Extra Lights
Paolo Pottolini	Italy	1981–82 Rollygo
Stephane Poughon	France	1985–86 L'Esprit d'équipe
Philippe Poupon	France	1981–82 Mor Bihan
Timothy Powell	Great Britain	1993–94 Reebok/Dolphin & Youth, 1997–98 Silk Cut, 2001–02 Team Tyco, 2005–06 Ericsson
Mike Powers	United States	1997–98 Toshiba
Dave Powys	Australia	1989–90 Rothmans, 1993–94 Fortuna
Paola Pozzonlini	Italy	1977–78 G&B Italia
Alastair (Alby) Pratt	Australia	1993–94 Brooksfield, 1997–98 Innovation Kvaerner, 2001–02 Team News Corp
Len Price	Great Britain	1973–74 Great Britain II
Allan Prior	New Zealand	1977–78 Heath's Condor, 1989–90 Fisher & Paykel, 1993–94 NZ Endeavour
Michael Priou	France	1981–82 33 Export
Marco Profili	Italy	1989–90 Gatorade
Franck Proffit	France	1989–90 Belmont Finland II, 2001–02 Djuice Dragons
Andrea Proto	Italy	1989–90 Gatorade, 1993–94 Brooksfield
Alain Provost	France	1977–78 Gauloises II
Jean-Jacques Provoyeur	France	1985–86 Drum
Zbigniew Puchalski	Poland	1973–74 Copernicus
Karl Puetz	Germany	1989–90 Schlüssel von Bremen
Melissa Purdy	United States	1997–98 EF Education, 2001–02 Amer Sports Too
Herbert Putz	Germany	1989–90 Schlüssel von Bremen
Rudy Puystjens	Belgium	1985–86 Rucanor TriStar

== Q ==
Sailor	Nationality	Year
Alessandro Quaglia	Italy	1977–78 B&B Italia
Stuart Quarrie	Great Britain	1997–98 BrunelSunergy
Joaquin Quero	Spain	1981–82 Licor 43
Patrice Quesnel	France	1973–74 Kriter
Kino Qui Roga	Spain	1989–90 Fortuna Extra Lights
Mike Quilter	New Zealand	1985–86 Lion New Zealand, 1989–90 Steinlager 2, 1993–94 NZ Endeavour, 1997–98 Merit Cup, 2001–02 Team Tyco

== R ==
Sailor	Nationality	Year
Arthur Radford	South Africa	1981–82 Xargo III, 1985–86 Atlantic Privateer, 1989–90 NCB Ireland
Tony Rae	New Zealand	1985–86 Lion New Zealand, 1989–90 Steinlager 2, 1993–94 NZ Endeavour, 1997–98 Innovation Kvaerner, 2011–12 Camper Lifelovers, 2014–15 Team Vestas Wind
Abel Ram	Great Britain	1989–90 Liverpool Enterprise
Narberto Ramacciotti	Argentina	1981–82 La Barca Laboratorio
Juan Ramos	Spain	1981–82 Licor 43
Spike Ramsden	United States	1993–94 Reebok/Dolphin & Youth
Sebastian Rana	Uruguay	1993–94 Uruguay Natural
Sean Rankin	New Zealand	1985–86 Norsk Data GB
Thierry Rannou	France	1985–86 Côte d'Or, 1989–90 Fazisi
Jussi Rantanen	Finland	1989–90 Union Bank of Finland
Nicholas Ratcliffe	Great Britain	1977–78 King's Legend
Sven Rauschning	Germany	1989–90 Schlüssel von Bremen
Roberto Ravelli	Italy	1981–82 Ilgagomma
Nicholas Raynaud	France	1993–94 La Poste
J. M. Rayner	Great Britain	1977–78 Adventure
Ken Read	United States	2005–06 Ericsson, 2008–09 Il Mostro, 2011–12 Mar Mostro
Esko Rechardt	Finland	1989–90 Martela OF
Jacques Redier	France	1973–74 33 Export
Yvon Redier	France	1973–74 Tauranga & 33 Export
Jaques Redon	France	1973–74 Burton Cutter, 1977–78 ADC Accutrac, 1981–82 FCF Challenger
Vittorio Reggazola	Italy	1973–74 Tauranga
Bruno Regout	Belgium	1981–82 European University of Belgium
Claus Reichardt	Germany	1981–82 Walross III Berlin
Dirk Reidel	Netherlands	1977–78 Tielsa, 1981–82 Flyer II
William Reilly	United States	1985–86 Atlantic Privateer
Francis Reinhard	Switzerland	1977–78 Disque d'Or, 1981–82 Disque d'Or 3
Rolf Renken	Germany	1989–90 Schlüssel von Bremen
Jan Rens	Belgium	1977–78 Traité de Rome
Pieta Rens	France	1973–74 Grand Louis
Victor Renström	Sweden	1973–74 Keewaydin
Luca Repetto	Italy	1989–90 Gatorade, 1993–94 Brooksfield
Anthony Rey	United States	1997–98 Chessie Racing, 2001–02 Team SEB
Mark Reynolds	United States	2001–02 Team SEB
Alec Rhys	New Zealand	1989–90 Fisher & Paykel
Michel Ribet	France	1973–74 Tauranga
Pepe Ribes	Spain	2001–02 Amer Sports One, 2005–06 Movistar, 2008–09 Telefónica Blue, 2011–12 Telefónica
Herve Riboni	Switzerland	1993–94 Merit Cup
Serge Ricard	France	1989–90 La Poste
Emma Richards	Great Britain	2001–02 Amer Sports Too
Colin Richardson	South Africa	1993–94 Reebok/Dolphin & Youth
Toby Richardson	Australia	1989–90 NCB Ireland
Pierluigi Riches	Italy	1981–82 Rollygo
Dirk de Ridder	Netherlands	1997–98 Merit Cup, 2001–02 Illbruck Challenge, 2005–06 Pirates of the Caribbean, 2014–15 Team Brunel
Conny van Rietschoten	Netherlands	1977–78 Flyer, 1981–82 Flyer II
Pachi Rivero	Spain	2008–09 Telefónica Black
Ben de Ruyter	Netherlands	1977–78 Tielsa
John Ridgway	Great Britain	1977–78 Debenhams
Marie Christine Ridgway	Great Britain	1977–78 Debenhams
Claude Rigal	France	1977–78 Neptune
Eugene Riguidel	France	1981–82 Mor Bihan
Dawn Riley	United States	1989–90 Maiden, 1993–94 Heineken
Philip Riley	Great Britain	1989–90 Liverpool Enterprise
T. W. Rimmer	Great Britain	1973–74 British Soldier
Marie Riou	France	2017–18 Dongfeng Race Team
Yann Riou	France	2011–12 Groupama 4, 2014–15 Dongfeng Race Team
John Rist	Great Britain	1973–74 Great Britain II
A. Ritchie	Great Britain	1977–78 Adventure
E. Riviere	France	1973–74 Pen Duick III
Francisco Rivero	Italy	2008–09 Telefónica Black
Alberto Rizzi	Italy	1993–94 Brooksfield
Paolo Rizzi	Italy	1989–90 Gatorade
Stefano Rizzi	Italy	1993–94 Brooksfield, 2001–02 Amer Sports One
Arve Roas	Norway	2001–02 Djuice Dragons, 2008–09 Ericsson 3
Alvaro Robaina	Uruguay	1993–94 Uruguay Natural
John Roberts	Great Britain	1977–78 King's Legend
Sam Roberts	Great Britain	1989–90 Liverpool Enterprise
Len Robertson	Great Britain	1973–74 Great Britain II
Graham Robinson	Great Britain	1989–90 Creighton's Naturally
Jeremy Robinson	Great Britain	2001–02 Team News Corp
Marc Robinson	Great Britain	1981–82 United Friendly
Rene Rochas	Switzerland	1981–82 Disque D'Or 3
Stephane Roche	France	1985–86 Shadow of Switzerland
Vincenzo Rocco	Italy	1981–82 Vivanapoli
Thierry Rodrigues	France	1989–90 L'Esprit de Liberté
Gerald Rogivue	Switzerland	1981–82 Disque d'Or 3, 1985–86 UBS Switzerland, 1989–90 Merit, 1993–94 Merit Cup, 1997–98 BrunelSunergy
David Rolfe	New Zealand	1997–98 Swedish Match, 2001–02 Team SEB, 2005–06 Ericsson, 2011–12 Sanya Lan
Manolo Romagosa Caralt	Spain	1985–86 Fortuna Lights
Angelo Romanengo	Italy	1981–82 Rollygo, 1993–94 Brooksfield
Giovanni Romano	Italy	1981–82 Vivanapoli
Craig Rook	New Zealand	1989–90 With Integrity
Rorrie Roos	South Africa	1977–78 Heath's Condor
Tjerk M. Romke de Vries	Netherlands	1973–74 Sayula II
Didier Roquet	France	1973–74 Kriter
M. Rose	Great Britain	1973–74 Adventure
Amory Ross	United States	2011–12 Mar Mostro, 2014–15 Team Alvimedica
Euan Ross	Great Britain	1989–90 With Integrity
Murray Ross	New Zealand	1985–86 NZI Enterprise, 1989–90 Fisher & Paykel, 1993–94 Yamaha, 1997–98 Toshiba
Paul Rosser	New Zealand	1973–74 Burton Cutter
J. B. Rosson	Great Britain	1973–74 British Soldier
Hans Roth	Germany	1981–82 Walross III Berlin
Eddy Rothlisberger	Switzerland	1981–82 Disque d'Or 3
Kwan-Min Roubakine	Switzerland	1993–94 Merit Cup
Thomas Rouxel	France	2014–15 Dongfeng Race Team
Michael Rowe	Australia	1989–90 Liverpool Enterprise
Nick Rowe	Great Britain	1973–74 Burton Cutter
Bernard Rubenstein	France	1973–74 Pen Duick VI, 1977–78 Neptune
Mark Rudiger	United States	1997–98 EF Language, 2001–02 Assa Abloy, 2005–06 Ericsson
Tomas Ruether	Germany	1977–78 Traité de Rome
Gibert Rumo	Switzerland	1981–82 Disque d'Or 3
Roland Rupp	Germany	1989–90 Schlüssel von Bremen
Florent Ruppert	France	1993–94 La Poste
Claire Russell	Great Britain	1989–90 Maiden
Tomas H. Ruter	Germany	1973–74 Peter von Danzig
Owen Rutter	New Zealand	1981–82 Ceramco New Zealand
Dominic Ryan-Kidd	New Zealand	1989–90 With Integrity
R. S. Ryott	Great Britain	1977–78 Adventure
Ryszard Mackiewicz	Poland	1973–74 Copernicus

== S ==
Sailor	Nationality	Year
Jacques Saada	France	1981–82 Gauloises 3, 1989–90 Charles Jourdan
Jean Louis Sabarly	France	1977–78 33 Export & Japy-Hermés
Anne Maria Sabatier	France	1977–78 Japy-Hermés
David Saeys	Belgium	1989–90 Rucanor Sport
Valeri Safioullin	Soviet Union	1989–90 Fasizi
Kalle Saksela	Finland	1989–90 Martela OF
Mika Saksela	Finland	1985–86 Fazer Finland, 1989–90 Martela OF
Harri Saksi	Finland	1989–90 Belmont Finland II
Enrico Sala	Italy	1977–78 B&B Italia, 1981–82 Rollygo
Dante Salamon	Argentina	1981–82 La Barca Laboratorio
Spencer Salem	Canada	1989–90 The Card
Johan Salén	Sweden	1989–90 The Card
T. J. Sales	Great Britain	1973–74 Adventure
Bob Salmon	Great Britain	1985–86 Norsk Data GB, 1989–90 Liverpool Enterprise
Paul Salmon	New Zealand	1989–90 NCB Ireland
Russel Salmon	Great Britain	1985–86 Norsk Data GB
Matti Salo	Finland	1981–82 Skopbank of Finland
Markku Salovaara	Finland	1989–90 Union Bank of Finland
Guy Salter	Great Britain	2001–02 Team Tyco, 2008–09 Ericsson 4
Julian Salter	Great Britain	2005–06 Pirates of the Caribbean, 2008–09 Ericsson 4, 2017–18 team AkzoNobel
Robert Salthouse	New Zealand	2001–02 Team Tyco, 2008–09 Il Mostro, 2011–12 Camper Lifelovers, 2014–15 Team Vestas Wind
Alejandro Salustio	Uruguay	1993–94 Uruguay Natural
Carlos Sampredro	Spain	1993–94 Galicia '93 Pescanova
Serge Samuel	France	1981–82 33 Export
Jeremy Samuels	Great Britain	1981–82 FCF Challenger
Kim Sanders-Fisher	United States	1989–90 With Integrity
Mike Sanderson	New Zealand	1993–94 NZ Endeavour, 1997–98 Merit Cup, 2005–06 ABN Amro I, 2011–12 Sanya Lan
James Sanford	United States	1989–90 Liverpool Enterprise
Alain Sangier	France	1977–78 Neptune
Giuseppe Sanna	Italy	1981–82 Ilgagomma
David Sansom	Great Britain	1989–90 Liverpool Enterprise
Jan Santana	Spain	1989–90 Fortuna Extra Lights, 1993–94 Galicia '93 Pescanova
Michel Santander	France	1981–82 Kriter IX & Flyer
Alfonso Santori	Italy	1981–82 Save Venice
Jacques Sarasin	Switzerland	1977–78 King's Legend
Gaye Sarma	Great Britain	1981–82 Traité de Rome
Craig Satterthwaite	New Zealand	1997–98 Swedish Match, 2005–06 Pirates of the Caribbean, 2008–09 Il Mostro, 2011–12 Azzam
James Saunders	Great Britain	1989–90 Fazisi
Pascal Savatier	France	1985–86 Côte d'Or
Hans Savimaki	Finland	1977–78 King's Legend
Debbie Scaling	United States	1981–82 Xargo III
Jeremy Scantlebury	New Zealand	1985–86 NZI Enterprise
Kaspar Schadegg	Switzerland	1993–94 Merit Cup
Klaus Schafer	Germany	1981–82 Walross III Berlin
Philippe Schaff	France	1977–78 33 Export, 1981–82 33 Export
Niels Schakinger-Larsen	Denmark	1985–86 SAS Baia Viking
Bert Schandevyl	Belgium	2008–09 Black Betty, 2011–12 Sanya Lan
Guy Schelkens	Belgium	1989–90 Equity & Law II
Christian Scherrer	Switzerland	1993–94 Merit Cup
Wolf-Dietfried Schiel	Germany	1989–90 Schlüssel von Bremen
Phillippe Schiller	Switzerland	1989–90 Merit, 1993–94 Hetman Sahaidachny
Hans Schimmelpfennig	Germany	1981–82 Walross III Berlin
Klaus Schneider	Germany	1989–90 Schlüssel von Bremen
Arjan Schouten	Netherlands	1977–78 Tielsa
Roderick van Schreven	Switzerland	1977–78 Disque d'Or
Guy Schwartz	France	1973–74 Kriter
James Schwerdt	Great Britain	1989–90 Liverpool Enterprise
Patrick Schriber	Switzerland	1985–86 UBS Switzerland
Anke Schulz	Germany	1981–82 Walross III Berlin
Rasmus Schwandt	Germany	1989–90 Schlüssel von Bremen
David Scott	Great Britain	1997–98 Chessie Racing
Jeffrey Scott	New Zealand	1989–90 Fisher & Paykel, 1993–94 Yamaha, 1997–98 America's Challenge & Toshiba, 2001–02 Team News Corp & Djuice Dragons, 2005–06 Brunel
Abigail Seager	Great Britain	2001–02 Amer Sports Too
C. F. Seal	Great Britain	1973–74 Adventure
E. F. M. Searle	Great Britain	1977–78 Adventure
Richard Seay	United States	1981–82 Alaska Eagle
Joachim Seeling	Germany	1989–90 Schlüssel von Bremen
Bernhard Seger	Switzerland	1985–86 UBS Switzerland
Nicolai Sehested	Denmark	2014–15 Team Vestas Wind, 2017–18 team AkzoNobel
Pierre Seigneurin	France	1981–82 Euromarché
Yury Semenyuk	Ukraine	1993–94 Hetman Sahaidachny
Bertrand Seydoux	Switzerland	1993–94 Merit Cup
Freddie Shanks	Great Britain	2008–09 Green Dragon
Cole Sheehan	New Zealand	1985–86 Lion New Zealand, 1989–90 Steinlager 2, 1993–94 NZ Endeavour
Frank Sheehan	Great Britain	1973–74 Second Life
Mark Sheffield	Great Britain	1993–94 Reebok/Dolphin & Youth
M. C. Shirley	Great Britain	1973–74 Adventure
Kevin Shoebridge	New Zealand	1985–86 Lion New Zealand, 1989–90 Steinlager 2, 1993–94 NZ Endeavour, 1997–98 Merit Cup, 2001–02 Team Tyco
Pierre Sicouri	Italy	1977–78 B&B Italia, 1981–82 Rollygo, 1989–90 Gatorade, 1993–94 Brooksfield
Joao Signorini	Brazil	2005–06 Brasil1, 2008–09 Ericsson 4, 2011–12 Telefónica
Peder Silfverhielm	Sweden	1981–82 Swedish Entry
Pablo Silva	Uruguay	1993–94 Uruguay Natural
Louis Sinclair	Netherlands Antilles	2014–15 Azzam, 2017–18 Mapfre
Lars Sjögren	Sweden	1989–90 The Card
M. Skene	Great Britain	1973–74 Adventure
Dennis Skillicorn	Great Britain	1989–90 Creighton's Naturally
Justin Slattery	Ireland	2001–02 Team News Corp, 2005–06 ABN Amro I, 2008–09 Green Dragon, 2011–12 Azzam, 2014–15 Azzam
Hans Sluman	Netherlands	1989–90 Gatorade
Rupert Smalley	Great Britain	1981–82 United Friendly
Justin Smart	Great Britain	1977–78 Heath's Condor
Noel Smart	Great Britain	1977–78 Debenhams
Piet Smet	Belgium	1985–86 Rucanor TriStar
Alan Smith	Great Britain	1973–74 Burton Cutter
Alan Smith	New Zealand	1997–98 Toshiba
Andrew Smith	Great Britain	1989–90 Rucanor Sport
Casey Smith	Australia	2008–09 Il Mostro, 2011–12 Mar Mostro
Charles Smith	South Africa	1973–74 Jakaranda
Craig Smith	New Zealand	2001–02 Team News Corp
David Smith	Great Britain	1977–78 Great Britain II
Dee Smith	United States	1997–98 Chessie Racing, 2001–02 Amer Sports One
Garfield Smith	Great Britain	1989–90 British Satquote Defender
Jeremy Smith	New Zealand	2005–06 Pirates of the Caribbean
Lawrie Smith	Great Britain	1985–86 Drum, 1989–90 Rothmans, 1993–94 Fortuna & Intrum Justitia, 1997–98 Silk Cut
Matthew Smith	New Zealand	1981–82 Outward Bound, 1985–86 NZI Enterprise, 1989–90 Fisher & Paykel, 1993–94 Tokio
John Smullen	Ireland	1989–90 NCB Ireland
Tom Soderholm	Finland	1989–90 Belmont Finland II
Philippe Soetaert	France	1977–78 Traité de Rome & Gauloises II
Erik Soper	United States	1985–86 Atlantic Privateer
Andres Soriano	Spain	2011–12 Sanya Lan
Stig Sorensen	Denmark	1981–82 Traité de Rome
Torsten Worre Sorenson	Denmark	1985–86 SAS Baia Viking, 1989–90 NCB Ireland
Rafael Sosa	Uruguay	1993–94 Uruguay Natural
Ivor South	Great Britain	1981–82 FCF Challenger
David Sowry	Great Britain	1989–90 Creighton's Naturally
Glen Sowry	New Zealand	1985–86 Lion New Zealand, 1989–90 Steinlager 2, 1993–94 NZ Endeavour, 1997–98 Merit Cup
Barbara Span	United States	1993–94 Heineken
Grant Spanhake	New Zealand	1985–86 Lion New Zealand, 1989–90 Fisher & Paykel, 1997–98 Chessie Racing, 2001–02 Team Tyco
Stefano Spangaro	Italy	1993–94 Brooksfield
Tom Sperry	Great Britain	1985–86 Norsk Data GB
I. G. Spilstead	Great Britain	1977–78 Adventure
Joe Spooner	New Zealand	2001–02 Team News Corp
Dieter Stadler	Switzerland	1993–94 Merit Cup
Geoff Stagg	Great Britain	1981–82 Ceramco New Zealand
Hendrick Stahl	Germany	1989–90 Schlüssel von Bremen
Claudio Stampi	Italy	1981–82 La Barca Laboratorio
Paul Standbridge	Great Britain	1981–82 Xargo III, 1985–86 Atlantic Privateer, 1989–90 Rothmans, 1993–94 Fortuna & Intrum Justitia, 1997–98 Toshiba
Serguei Stanetsky	Soviet Union	1989–90 Fazisi
J. Stanyer	Great Britain	1977–78 Adventure
John Stapleton	Great Britain	1973–74 Second Life
Adrian Stead	Great Britain	1997–98 Silk Cut
David Steele	Great Britain	1989–90 Liverpool Enterprise
Rudiger Steinbeck	Germany	1973–74 Peter von Danzig
Ari Steinberg	United States	1977–78 Flyer
Philippe Steinmann	France	1989–90 Belmont Finland II
Maria Steffen	Netherlands	1985–86 Norsk Data GB
Tim Stephens	Great Britain	1985–86 Norsk Data GB
Olivier Stern-Veyrin	France	1973–74 Kriter & 33 Export, 1977–78 Disque d'Or
William Stern-Veyrin	France	1977–78 Disque d'Or
Mark Stevens	Great Britain	1989–90 British Satquote Defender
Ian Stewart	New Zealand	1993–94 Tokio, 1997–98 Merit Cup
Thomas Stolberger	Great Britain	1985–86 Norsk Data GB
Adolf Straub	Germany	1981–82 Walross III Berlin
Wolfgang Streit	Germany	1989–90 Schlüssel von Bremen
Martin Strömberg	Sweden	2008–09 Ericsson 3, 2011–12 Groupama 4, 2014–15 Dongfeng Race Team, 2017–18 Turn the Tide on Plastic
Jose Suarez	Uruguay	1993–94 Uruguay Natural
Martin Suarez	Uruguay	1993–94 Uruguay Natural
Bridget Suckling	New Zealand	1997–98 EF Education, 2001–02 Amer Sports Too
David Sundbaum	Sweden	1973–74 Keewaydin
Petter Sundt	Norway	1981–82 United Friendly
Charles Sutcliffe	Great Britain	1977–78 Great Britain II
Adrianus Swagemakers	Great Britain	1981–82 FCF Challenger
Jonathan Swain	South Africa	1997–98 Chessie Racing, 2001–02 Team Tyco, 2005–06 Movistar, 2008–09 Telefónica Blue, 2011–12 Mar Mostro
Mandi Swan (Amanda Swan Neal)	New Zealand	1989–90 Maiden
Dave Swete	Great Britain	2011–12 Sanya Lan, 2014–15 Team Alvimedica
Slava Sysenko	Ukraine	1993–94 Hetman Sahaidachny

== T ==
Sailor	Nationality	Year
Éric Tabarly	France	1973–74 Pen Duick VI, 1981–82 Euromarché, 1985–86 Côte d'Or, 1993–94 La Poste
Patrick Tabarly	France	1973–74 Pen Duick VI, 1989–90 L'Esprit de Liberté
Janus Tahir	Switzerland	1981–82 Vivanapoli
R. S. P. Tamlyn	Great Britain	1973–74 British Soldier
John Tanner	Great Britain	1973–74 Burton Cutter, 1977–78 ADC Accutrac
Peter Tans	Netherlands	1989–90 Equity & Law II, 1993–94 Brooksfield, 1997–98 BrunelSunergy
Alan Taphouse	Great Britain	1973–74 Second Life
Paul Taplin	Great Britain	1989–90 British Satquote Defender
Kieran Tarbett	Ireland	1989–90 NCB Ireland
Bronislaw Tarnacki	Poland	1973–74 Copernicus
Andrew Taylor	New Zealand	1985–86 Lion New Zealand, 1989–90 Fisher & Paykel
Digby Taylor	New Zealand	1981–82 Outward Bound, 1985–86 NZI Enterprise
Graham Taylor	Australia	2005–06 Brunel
Philip Taylor	New Zealand	1981–82 Bubblegum
Jesus Tello	Spain	1985–86 Fortuna Lights
Nodari Teneishvili	Soviet Union	1989–90 Fazisi
Henrik Tenstrom	Finland	1985–86 Fazer Finland, 1989–90 Union Bank of Finland
Edgar Terechin	Soviet Union	1989–90 Fazisi
Leonardo Testa	Italy	1981–82 Vivanapoli
Tom Thawley	United States	1993–94 Odessa
Henrik Thelen	Finland	1989–90 Belmont Finland II
Kenneth Thelen	Finland	1989–90 Belmont Finland II
François Thépaut	France	1973–74 Grand Louis
Patrick Therond	France	1977–78 Japy-Hermés
Barrie Thomas	Great Britain	1989–90 Rothmans
Mark Thomas	Australia	2005–06 Brunel
Ralph Thomas	South Africa	1985–86 Atlantic Privateer
Diana Thomas-Ellam	Great Britain	1977–78 Great Britain II
Brian Thompson	Great Britain	2005–06 ABN Amro I
Bob Thompson	Great Britain	1981–82 Alaska Eagle
Mike Thompson	Great Britain	1973–74 Great Britain II
S. G. Thompson	Great Britain	1977–78 Adventure
T. Thompson	Great Britain	1973–74 Adventure
Rafael Tibau	Spain	1989–90 Fortuna Extra Lights
Christopher Tibbs	Great Britain	1985–86 Norsk Data, 1989–90 Liverpool Enterprise
Tiger Teng Jiang He	China	2011–12 Sanya Lan Lan
Simeon Tienpont	Netherlands	2005–06 ABN Amro II, 2014–15 Team Vestas Wind, 2017–18 team AkzoNobel
Pierre Tocny	France	1989–90 L'Esprit de Liberté
Yury Tokovoy	Ukraine	1993–94 Hetman Sahaidachny
Rick Tomlinson	Great Britain	1985–86 Drum, 1989–90 The Card, 1993–94 Intrum Justitia, 1997–98 EF Education & EF Language
Chr Tommessen	Norway	1981–82 Berge Viking
C. M. Toner	Great Britain	1977–78 Adventure
Graham Tongue	Great Britain	1981–82 United Friendly
John Toon	New Zealand	1985–86 Drum
Alan Toones	Great Britain	1973–74 Great Britain II
Mike Toppa	United States	1997–98 Chessie Racing
Jose-Maria Torcida	Spain	1993–94 Galicia '93 Pescanova
Sveinung Torgersen	Norway	1997–98 Innovation Kvaerner
Ari Toroi	Finland	1989–90 Martela OF
Riccardo Tosti	Italy	1973–74 CS e RB
Jean Totot	France	1981–82 Euromarché
Joan Lee Touchette	United States	1997–98 EF Education
Mark Towill	United States	2014–15 Team Alvimedica, 2017–18 Vestas 11th Hour Racing
David Townsend	Great Britain	1989–90 Creighton's Naturally
Clive Tremain	New Zealand	1993–94 Hetman Sahaidachny
Dale Tremain	New Zealand	1981–82 Outward Bound, 1989–90 Fazisi, 1993–94 Hetman Sahaidachny
Paul Tremewan	New Zealand	1981–82 United Friendly
Steve Trevurza	New Zealand	1989–90 Fisher & Paykel, 1993–94 Yamaha
Marcel van Triest	Netherlands	1989–90 Equity & Law II, 1993–94 Intrum Justitia, 1997–98 Innovation Kvaerner, 2001–02 Team SEB, 2005–06 Brasil1
Luis Trigueros	Spain	1985–86 Fortuna Lights
H. Trotter	Great Britain	1973–74 Adventure
P. O. M. J. Trotter	Great Britain	1973–74 Adventure
Rafael Trujillo	Spain	2014–15 Mapfre
A. E. Truluck	Great Britain	1973–74 British Soldier
Edwin Trzos	Poland	1973–74 Otago
Jerome Tschudi	Switzerland	1981–82 Disque d'Or 3
Jumberi Tsomaya	Soviet Union	1989–90 Fazisi
Blair Tuke	New Zealand	2017–18 Mapfre
Mark Turner	Great Britain	1989–90 British Satquote Defender
R. A. S. Turner	Great Britain	1973–74 Adventure
Nigel Tuttle	France	1989–90 L'Esprit de Liberté
Gregary Tuxworth	United States	1977–78 King's Legend

== U ==
Sailor	Nationality	Year
Victor Unzueta	Spain	1993–94 Galicia '93 Pescanova
Cecelia Unger	Sweden	1981–82 United Friendly
Gillian Upchurch	Great Britain	1989–90 With Integrity

== V ==
Sailor	Nationality	Year
Gigi Vaicava	Italy	1973–74 Guia
Ulf Vagt	Germany	1989–90 Schlüssel von Bremen
Marina Valcke	France	1989–90 With Integrity
Bruce Valentine	Great Britain	1981–82 FCF Challenger
G. M. F. Vallings	Great Britain	1973–74 Adventure
Ville Valtonen	Finland	1989–90 Union Bank of Finland
Franck Van Beuningen	Belgium	1973–74 Grand Louis
S. Van der Byl	Great Britain	1973–74 Adventure
Yvonne Van der Byl	Great Britain	1973–74 Jakaranda & Sayula II
Henri Vanderhaeghen	Belgium	1985–86 Côte d'Or
Onne Vanderwal	Netherlands	1981–82 Flyer II
Paul Van Dyke	United States	1993–94 Fortuna, 1997–98 Chessie Racing
Robrecht Van Dyke	Belgium	1989–90 With Integrity
Bart Van Den Dwey	Belgium	1989–90 Creighton's Naturally
Lionel Van Der Houwen	France	1989–90 Rucanor Sport
Michel Vanek	France	1973–74 Grand Louis
Sylvie Vanek	France	1973–74 Grand Louis
Thierry Vanier	France	1973–74 Pen Duick VI & Tauranga
Bart Van Miert	Belgium	1989–90 Equity & Law II
Bastiaan Van Rijswijk	Belgium	1985–86 Rucanor TriStar
Roger Vanstone	Great Britain	1989–90 Creighton's Naturally
Richard Van Vereen	Belgium	1985–86 Côte d'Or, 1989–90 The Card
Herman Vanura	Germany	1977–78 Heath's Condor
Gustavo Vanzini	Uruguay	1993–94 Uruguay Natural
Eric Vassard	France	1981–82 Gauloises 3 & Mor Bihan
Gilles Vaton	France	1973–74 Kriter, 1977–78 Neptune
C. D. Vaughan	Great Britain	1977–78 Adventure
Clive Vaughan	Great Britain	1981–82 FCF Challenger
Roger Vaughan	United States	1989–90 Fazisi
Serge Vayrette	France	1977–78 Japy-Hermés
Charles Veillard-Baron	France	1981–82 Euromarché
Maurice Veluzat	Switzerland	1985–86 Shadow of Switzerland
Kennth Venn	South Africa	1997–98 Toshiba
Christophe Venthey	Switzerland	1981–82 Disque d'Or 3
David Vera	Spain	2008–09 Telefónica Black
Anatoly Verba	Ukraine	1989–90 Fazisi, 1993–94 Odessa
Giovanni Verbini	Italy	1973–74 Guia, 1981–82 Rollygo, 1989–90 Gatorade
Wouter Verbraak	Netherlands	2001–02 Djuice Dragons, 2008–09 Kosatka & Green Dragon & Black Betty, 2014–15 Team Vestas Wind
Sylvain Vergnot	France	1981–82 Euromarché
David Vernon	Great Britain	1989–90 Creighton's Naturally
Gustaaf Versluys	Belgium	1981–82 Croky, 1985–86 Rucanor TriStar
Luis Vial y de Vial	Spain	1981–82 Licor 43
Roberto Vianello	Italy	1981–82 Ilgagomma
Andre Viant	France	1973–74 Grand Louis, 1981–82 Kriter IX
Bènèdicte Viant	France	1973–74 Grand Louis
Françoise Viant	France	1977–78 Japy-Hermès, 1981–82 Kriter 1X
Jean Michel Viant	France	1973–74 Grand Louis, 1977–78 Japy-Hermés
Enrique Vidal Paz	Spain	1977–78 B&B Italia
Philipe Viellescase	France	1973–74 33 Export
Fransisco Vignale	Argentina	2014–15 Mapfre
Juan Vila	Spain	1989–90 Fortuna Extra Lights, 1993–94 Galicia '93 Pescanova, 1997–98 Chessie Racing, 2001–02 Illbruck Challenge, 2017–18 Mapfre
Ricardo Vilarosa	Italy	1973–74 Burton Cutter
Jacques Vincent	France	1989–90 The Card, 1993–94 Tokio, 1997–98 Innovation Kvaerner, 2001–02 Djuice Dragons
Peter Visick	Great Britain	1977–78 Heath's Condor
Javier Visiers	Spain	1985–86 Fortuna Lights
Bert Visser	Netherlands	1985–86 Philips Innovator
Edwin Visser	Netherlands	1989–90 Equity & Law II
Tanja Visser	Netherlands	1989–90 Maiden
John Vitali	Netherlands	1981–82 Flyer II
Peter Vitali	Netherlands	1993–94 Winston
Gigi Vivcava	Italy	1981–82 Rollygo
Gianspirito Vocchelli	Italy	1977–78 B&B Italia
Alar Volmer	Estonia	1989–90 Belmont Finland II

== W ==
Sailor	Nationality	Year
Jonas Wackenhuth	Sweden	2001–02 Djuice Dragons
Phil Wade	Great Britain	1985–86 Drum
James Wadson	Bermuda	1989–90 Fisher & Paykel
Georges Wagner	Switzerland	1985–86 UBS Switzerland, 1993–94 Merit Cup
Lawrence Wale	South Africa	1973–74 Sayula II
Ian (Barney) Walker	Australia	1997–98 Innovation Kvaerner & Toshiba, 2001–02 Team News Corp, 2005–06 Brunel & Ericsson
Ian Walker	Great Britain	2008–09 Green Dragon, 2011–12 Azzam, 2014–15 Azzam
Brian Wallis	New Zealand	1993–94 Odessa
The Hon Quentin Wallop	Great Britain	1977–78 Great Britain II
Marie Walsh	Great Britain	1989–90 With Integrity
P. L-C. Walters	Great Britain	1977–78 Adventure
Chris Ward	New Zealand	1997–98 Toshiba
Nigel Ward	Great Britain	1989–90 Liverpool Enterprise
Liz Wardley	Australia	2001–02 Amer Sports Too, 2014–15 Team SCA, 2017–18 Turn the Tide on Plastic
Peter Warren	New Zealand	1989–90 NCB Ireland
Thomas Warren	New Zealand	1989–90 Fisher & Paykel
Paul Waterhouse^{†}	Great Britain	1973–74 British Soldier & Tauranga
Colin Watkins	Great Britain	1989–90 British Satquote Defender
C. Watkins	Great Britain	1973–74 Adventure
Martin Watts	Great Britain	2008–09 Black Betty
Craig Watson	New Zealand	1989–90 Steinlager 2, 1993–94 NZ Endeavour
James H. Watts	Great Britain	1977–78 Adventure
Dominique Wavre	Switzerland	1981–82 Disque d'Or 3, 1985–86 UBS Switzerland, 1989–90 Merit, 1993–94 Intrum Justitia
Kim Weber	Finland	1989–90 Union Bank of Finland
Thomas Weber	Germany	1973–74 Peter von Danzig
A. K. Webster	Great Britain	1977–78 Adventure
R. K. Webster	Great Britain	1973–74 British Soldier
Dominique Weibel	Switzerland	1985–86 UBS Switzerland
Peter Weidner	Germany	1989–90 Schlüssel von Bremen
Gösta Werner	Sweden	1973–74 Keewaydin
Alain Wessner	Switzerland	1985–86 Shadow of Switzerland
David West	New Zealand	1985–86 NZI Enterprise
Paul West	Great Britain	1989–90 With Integrity
Stig Westergaard	Denmark	2001–02 Djuice Dragons, 2008–09 Kosatka
Emma Westmacott	Great Britain	1997–98 EF Education, 2001–02 Amer Sports Too
Grant Wharington	Australia	2001–02 Djuice Dragons, 2005–06 Brunel
Richard Wheeler	Great Britain	1981–82 Outward Bound
David White	New Zealand	1985–86 Shadow of Switzerland, 1989–90 Martela OF
Genevive White	Australia	2001–02 Amer Sports Too
Mitchel White	Australia	2005–06 Brunel
Morgan White	Australia	2008–09 Black Betty
Nick White	New Zealand	1993–94 Yamaha, 2001–02 Team News Corp
Richard White	New Zealand	1981–82 Ceramco New Zealand
Roderick White	Great Britain	1977–78 Flyer
Stephen White	Great Britain	1977–78 Great Britain II
A. Whitfield	Great Britain	1973–74 British Soldier
John R. Whitfield	Great Britain	1973–74 Second Life
David Whittles	Great Britain	1981–82 United Friendly
Kate Whowell	Great Britain	1989–90 Creighton's Naturally
Peter Wibroe	Denmark	2014–15 Team Vestas Wind
Nicholas Wigram	New Zealand	1985–86 Shadow of Switzerland
Markku Wiikeri	Finland	1981–82 Skopbank of Finland, 1989–90 Martela OF
Kari Wilen	Finland	1989–90 Union Bank of Finland
Brian Wilhoite	United States	2001–02 Amer Sports One
Donald Wilks	Great Britain	1981–82 FCF Challenger
Hamish Willcox	New Zealand	1989–90 Belmont Finland II
Paul Willcox	South Africa	2011–12 Azzam
Mark Willett	Australia	1985–86 Equity & Law, 1989–90 Rothmans
Nicholas Willetts	New Zealand	1993–94 NZ Endeavour, 1997–98 Innovation Kvaerner
Gareth Williams	Great Britain	1981–82 FCF Challenger
Erle Williams	New Zealand	1981–82 Flyer II, 1997–98 Swedish Match, 2001–02 Djuice Dragons, 2005–06 Pirates of the Caribbean, 2008–09 Il Mostro
Leslie Williams	Great Britain	1973–74 Burton Cutter, 1977–78 Heath's Condor, 1981–82 FCF Challenger
Anthony Wills	Great Britain	1981–82 FCF Challenger
Camron Wills	New Zealand	2008–09 Kosatka
Hugh Wilson	Great Britain	1977–78 Flyer
Stuart Wilson	New Zealand	1993–94 Fortuna, 1997–98 Chessie Racing, 2001–02 Assa Abloy, 2005–06 Brasil1, 2008–09 Black Betty
Steve Wilson	Australia	1985–86 NZI Enterprise
J. H. Wiltshire	Great Britain	1973–74 Adventure
Stefan Winberg	Sweden	1989–90 The Card
B. C. Winfield	Great Britain	1977–78 Adventure
Jan Winquist	Finland	1985–86 Fazer Finland, 1989–90 Union Bank of Finland
John Winquist	Finland	1989–90 Belmont Finland II
D. Wise	Great Britain	1977–78 Adventure
Daryl Wislang	New Zealand	2008–09 Telefónica Blue, 2011–12 Camper Lifelovers, 2014–15 Azzam, 2017–18 Dongfeng Race Team
Ian Wittewrongel	Belgium	1985–86 Rucanor TriStar
David Witt	Australia	1997–98 Innovation Kvaerner, 2017–18 Team Sun Hung Kai/Scallywag
Klaus Witting	Germany	1985–86 Norsk Data GB
Daniel Wloszczowski	France	1981–82 Flyer II
Henrik Wolontis	Finland	1989–90 Union Bank of Finland
Richard Wooders	New Zealand	1989–90 Liverpool Enterprise
Tom Woodfield	Great Britain	1977–78 Debenhams
Graeme Woodroffe	New Zealand	1989–90 Fisher & Paykel
Simon Woods	Great Britain	1993–94 Reebok/Dolphin & Youth
William Woods	Great Britain	1977–78 Great Britain II
Ian Worley	Great Britain	1977–78 Great Britain II
Kimo Worthington	United States	1997–98 EF Language
Magnus Woxén	Sweden	1997–98 Swedish Match, 2001–02 Team SEB, 2005–06 Ericsson, 2008–09 Ericsson 3
Benedict Wrede	Finland	1985–86 Fazer Finland, 1989–90 Martela OF
Donald Wright	New Zealand	1981–82 Ceramco New Zealand, 1989–90 Steinlager 2
Frank Wulfken	Germany	1989–90 Schlüssel von Bremen
P. Wykeham-Martin	Great Britain	1973–74 Adventure

== Y ==
Sailor	Nationality	Year
Jiru Yang	China	2014–15 Dongfeng Race Team
Victor Yasykov	Soviet Union	1989–90 Fazisi
Steven Yates	Great Britain	1989–90 Liverpool Enterprise
Paul Yeadon	Great Britain	1981–82 United Friendly
Alan Young	Great Britain	1989–90 Liverpool Enterprise
Robert Young	United States	1993–94 Hetman Sahaidachny

== Z ==
Sailor	Nationality	Year
Paul von Zalinski	New Zealand	1981–82 Ceramco New Zealand, 1985–86 Lion New Zealand
Juan Zarauza	Spain	1993–94 Galicia '93 Pescanova
Nora Zehender-Mueller	Switzerland	1985–86 Shadow of Switzerland
Otto Zehender-Mueller	Switzerland	1985–86 Shadow of Switzerland
Oleg Zherebtsov	Russia	2008–09 Kosatka
Jean-Pierre Zeigert	Switzerland	1989–90 Merit
Mario Zimmerman	France	1981–82 Charles Heidsieck III, 1985–86 Drum, 1989–90 Charles Jourdan
Ruedi Zimmerman	Netherlands	1977–78 Tielsa
Burkhard Zipfel	Germany	1981–82 Walross III Berlin
Aris Ziros	Greece	1981–82 FCF Challenger & Traité de Rome
Klaartje Zuiderbaan	Netherlands	2001–02 Amer Sports Too
Enrico Zulveta	Spain	1977–78 Great Britain II
Andries Zwaenepoel	Belgium	1981–82 Croky
