= 2001 Sydney to Hobart Yacht Race =

2001 annual yacht race in Australia

57th Sydney to Hobart Yacht Race
Event information
- Type: Yacht
- Dates: 26 – 30 December 2001
- Sponsor: None
- Host city: Sydney, Hobart
- Boats: 75
- Distance: 630 nautical miles (1,170 km)
- Website: Website archive

Results
- Winner (2001): Assa Abloy (Neal McDonald)

Succession
- Previous: Nicorette II (Ludde Ingvall) in 2000
- Next: Alfa Romeo (Neville Crichton) in 2002

The 2001 Sydney to Hobart Yacht Race, was the 57th annual running of the "blue water classic" Sydney to Hobart Yacht Race. As in past editions of the race, it was hosted by the Cruising Yacht Club of Australia based in Sydney, New South Wales. No sponsor was selected for this year. As with previous Sydney to Hobart Yacht Races, the 2001 edition began on Sydney Harbour, at noon on Boxing Day (26 December 2001), before heading south for 630 nautical miles (1,170 km) through the Tasman Sea, past Bass Strait, into Storm Bay and up the River Derwent, to cross the finish line in Hobart, Tasmania.

The 2001 Race was also part of Leg 3 of the 2001–02 Volvo Ocean Race which started in Sydney and finished in Auckland. The 2001 fleet comprised 75 starters of which 57 completed the race and 18 yachts retired.

== Results ==
=== Line Honours ===
Pos	Sail Number	Yacht	State/Country	Yacht Type	LOA (Metres)	Skipper	Elapsed time d:hh:mm:ss
1	SWE 1645	Assa Abloy	Sweden	Farr Volvo Ocean 60	19.44	Neal McDonald	2:20:46:43
2	SWE 11111	Nicorette	Sweden	Simonis-Voogd 79 Maxi	24.07	Ludde Ingvall	2:21:01:17
3	EUR 1	Amer Sports One	Italy	Frers Volvo Ocean 60	19.44	Grant Dalton	2:21:10:31
4	NOR2	Djuice Dragons	Norway	Davidson Volvo Ocean 60	19.44	Knut Frostad	2:21:27:55
5	AUS9011	Team News Corp	New South Wales	Farr Volvo Ocean 60	19.44	Ross Field	2:21:32:26
6	GER4014	Illbruck	Germany	Farr Volvo Ocean 60	19.44	John Kostecki	2:21:33:31
7	C1	Brindabella	New South Wales	Jutson 79	24.08	George Snow	2:23:17:27
8	8679	Line 7	New South Wales	Farr Volvo Ocean 60	19.44	Ian Treleaven	2:23:31:42
9	7441	Bumblebee 5	New South Wales	Murray Burns Dowell MBD 62	19.00	John Kahlbetzer	2:23:46:16
10	POL 7470	Lodka Bols	Poland	Frers 79 IOR Maxi	24.00	Gordon Kay	3:00:04:41
11	USA 69189	Icon	United States	Perry 65	19.81	Richard Robbins	3:03:40:29
12	6037	Eureka	Queensland	Murray Burns Dovell MBD 60	18.20	Leon Christianakis; Bob Robertson	3:07:27:51
13	AUS 70	Ragamuffin	New South Wales	Farr 50	15.05	Syd Fischer	3:09:58:37
14	NZL 6006	Starlight Express	New Zealand	Davidson 55	16.87	Stewart Thwaites	3:10:28:15
15	YC560	Rager	South Australia	Elliott 56	17.06	Gary Shanks	3:12:28:06
16	9797	Ninety Seven	New South Wales	Farr 47	14.30	Graham Gibson	3:13:10:58
17	7878	Aspect Computing	New South Wales	Lyons 52	16.20	David Pescud	3:13:53:44
18	8125	Valtair	New South Wales	Lyons 62	19.00	Matt Allen	3:14:59:29
19	1195	Valheru	Tasmania	Elliott 43 IMS Racer	13.00	Anthony Lyall	3:20:19:27
20	98	Zoe	Queensland	Murray MBD 41	12.53	Wayne Millar	3:20:36:30
21	6081	Next Prosail	New South Wales	Murray Burns Dowell Sydney 38 OD	11.78	Richard Holstein; Craig Malouf	3:21:37:58
22	SM2	Another Challenge	(Victoria (state)) Victoria	Murray Burns Dowell Sydney 38 OD	11.78	Lou Abrahams	3:21:42:17
23	8448	Loki	New South Wales	Frers Swan 48	14.83	Stephen Ainsworth	3:23:04:17
24	242	Sea Jay	New South Wales	Burns BH 41	12.46	Scott Wheelhouse	3:23:25:00
25	9407	Shipping Central	New South Wales	Farr Beneteau 40.7	11.92	Ashley Reed; Michael Spies	3:23:48:26
26	R133	Chutzpah	(Victoria (state)) Victoria	Murray Burns Dovell MBD 36	11.00	Bruce Taylor	4:00:36:46
27	6393	Mertsi Louise	New Zealand	Clark 72	21.90	Bryan Read	4:02:03:23
28	8402	More Witchcraft	New South Wales	Dibbley Eagle 46	13.94	John Cameron	4:03:48:28
29	SM377	Bacardi	(Victoria (state)) Victoria	Peterson 44	13.34	Graeme Ainley; John Williams	4:03:59:37
30	8338	AFR Midnight Rambler	New South Wales	Hick 35	10.53	Ed Psaltis; Bob Thomas	4:04:16:01
31	B52	B52	Tasmania	Murray Burns Dovell Sydney 41	12.49	Hughie Lewis	4:05:21:32
32	A8	Mirrabooka	Tasmania	Frers 47	13.40	John Bennetto	4:07:13:00
33	800	Vitesse	Tasmania	Farr Beneteau 40.7	11.92	Robert Howie	4:07:18:25
34	294	Love & War	New South Wales	Sparkman & Stephens S&S 47	14.21	Peter Kurts	4:07:25:52
35	5900	Wahoo	New South Wales	Frers Prestige 40	12.20	Brian Emerson	4:07:26:28
36	1987	Bright Morning Star	New South Wales	Peterson 50	15.50	Randal Wilson	4:07:31:11
37	4057	Aurora	New South Wales	Farr 40	12.19	Jim Holley	4:07:35:20
38	5527	Polaris of Belmont	New South Wales	Cole 43	13.24	John Quinn	4:07:37:50
39	SA998	Epsilon	South Australia	Van de Stadt Forna 37	11.50	Michael Tromp	4:07:50:14
40	S4440	Midnight Rambler II	(Victoria (state)) Victoria	Farr 40	12.24	Dennis Millikan	4:07:52:52
41	4924	She II	New South Wales	Mull Olsen 40	12.29	Peter Rogers	4:19:11:47
42	SM616	Magic	(Victoria (state)) Victoria	Sparkman & Stephens S&S 39	11.77	Philip Spey-Bailey	4:19:59:43
43	3709	Lady Penrhyn	New South Wales	Swarbrick 36	11.10	Paul Jones	4:21:18:33
44	8333	Red Rock Communications	New South Wales	Hick 30	8.90	Christopher Bowling	4:23:58:49
45	705	Spirit of Sydney	Tasmania	Lexcen Open 60	18.24	Gerald Fitzgerald	5:01:31:05
46	317	Kickatinalong	New South Wales	Adams 13	13.41	Mike De Berg	5:03:11:16
47	M2000	Kennard's Hire Solo Globe Challenger	New South Wales	Cole 43	13.25	Tony Mowbray	5:03:20:19
48	327	Zeus II	New South Wales	Joubert Currawong 30	9.00	James Dunstan	5:03:45:31
49	2557	Hogbreath Witchdoctor	New South Wales	Davidson 40 IOR Two Tonner	12.00	Maurie Cameron	5:07:16:28
50	SM596	Breakaway	(Victoria (state)) Victoria	Swanson 36	10.97	Martin Power	5:07:21:12
51	5891	Komatsu Blue Lady	New South Wales	Challenger 39	11.88	Shane Kearns; Jacqui Begbie	5:09:43:36
52	A113	Mark Twain	New South Wales	Sparkman & Stephens S&S 39	11.80	Hugh O'Neill	5:09:59:14
53	6911	Paea II	New Zealand	Mull 40	12.18	Rick Smith	5:11:08:29
54	371	Berrimilla	New South Wales	Joubert Brolga 33	10.10	Alex Whitworth	5:11:13:53
55	S110	Brindabella II	(Victoria (state)) Victoria	Adams 11	11.08	Roger Sayers	5:13:00:43
56	3644	Sorine	New South Wales	Carter 30	9.10	Ben Adamson	5:16:31:46
DNF	B400	Simply Red	(Victoria (state)) Victoria	Farr 40	12.25	Chris Bradbury	Retired-Rigging Damage
DNF	M10	Australian Skandia Wild Thing	(Victoria (state)) Victoria	Murray Burns Dovell MBD 83 Maxi	25.20	Grant Wharington	Retired-Mainsail Damage
DNF	M4	Cadibarra	(Victoria (state)) Victoria	Jones Hart 42	12.93	Nigel Jones	Retired-Sail Damage
DNF	8833	Sting	New South Wales	Farr 49	15.28	Terry Mullens	Retired-Rigging Damage
DNF	8889	Hollywood Boulevard	New South Wales	Farr 52	15.85	Ray Roberts	Retired-Mast Damage
DNF	SA3300	Secret Men's Business	South Australia	Murray MBD 42	12.75	Geoff Boettcher	Retired-Broken Mast
DNF	YC1000	SAP Ausmaid	South Australia	Farr 47	14.47	Kevan Pearce	Retired-Broken Mast
DNF	8848	Broomstick	New South Wales	Fa Steinman Open 60	18.28	Michael Cranitch	Retired-Rigging Damage
DNF	SWE1004	Rush	Sweden	Murray Burns Dovell Sydney Turbo 40	12.50	David Falt	Retired-Electrical Issues
DNF	8118	Faarst Forward	New South Wales	Farr Beneteau 40.7	12.50	Andrew Lygo	Retired-Rigging Damage
DNF	5995	Nips N Tux	New South Wales	Jeppersen IMX40	12.10	Howard de Torres	Retired-Engine Issues
DNF	8383	Krakatoa	New South Wales	Young 31	9.54	Rod Skellet	Retired-Crew Member Illness
DNF	A99	Grundig	New South Wales	Dovell MBD Open 66	20.11	Sean Langman	Retired-Hull Damage
DNF	4100	Terra Firma	New South Wales	Murray MBD 41	12.45	Stewart Niemann; Peter Bartels	Retired-Crew Member Injury
DNF	SWE 20001	Team SEB	Sweden	Farr Volvo Ocean 60	19.44	Gunnar Krantz	Retired-Rudder Damage
DNF	5438	Panache	New South Wales	Lavranos 36	11.15	Dennis Krawchuk	Retired-Electrical Issues
DNF	EUR 2	Amer Sports Too	Italy	Farr Volvo Ocean 60	19.44	Lisa McDonald	Retired-Broken Forestay
DNF	YC717	Liberator	South Australia	Farr 42	12.91	Geoff Catt	Retired-Broken Rudder
DNF	BER 2001	Team Tyco	Bermuda	Farr Volvo Ocean 60	19.44	Kevin Shoebridge	Retired-Disqualified ^{1}

Notes

^1 – Team Tyco were disqualified from the race and was scored as a DNF by the Race Committee due to breaching Sailing Instruction Rule 43.2 by failing to report into race control within one hour of passing the Green Cape mandatory safety check-in point before entering the Bass Strait on the second day of the race.

=== Overall Handicap ===
Pos	Division	Sail Number	Yacht	State/Country	Yacht Type	LOA (Metres)	Skipper	Corrected time d:hh:mm:ss
1	A	7441	Bumblebee 5	New South Wales	Murray Burns Dowell MBD 62	19.00	John Kahlbetzer	2:15:16:24
2	A	9797	Ninety Seven	New South Wales	Farr 47	14.30	Graham Gibson	2:18:15:49
3	A	AUS 70	Ragamuffin	New South Wales	Farr 50	15.05	Syd Fischer	2:19:08:50
4	B	9407	Shipping Central	New South Wales	Farr Beneteau 40.7	11.92	Ashley Reed; Michael Spies	2:19:32:39
5	A	6037	Eureka	Queensland	Murray Burns Dovell MBD 60	18.20	Leon Christianakis; Bob Robertson	2:20:10:20
6	B	R133	Chutzpah	(Victoria (state)) Victoria	Murray Burns Dovell MBD 36	11.00	Bruce Taylor	2:20:47:18
7	A	NZL 6006	Starlight Express	New Zealand	Davidson 55	16.87	Stewart Thwaites	2:20:48:49
8	B	8338	AFR Midnight Rambler	New South Wales	Hick 35	10.53	Ed Psaltis; Bob Thomas	2:21:03:50
9	B	SM2	Another Challenge	(Victoria (state)) Victoria	Murray Burns Dowell Sydney 38 OD	11.78	Lou Abrahams	2:21:08:41
10	B	6081	Next Prosail	New South Wales	Murray Burns Dowell Sydney 38 OD	11.78	Richard Holstein; Craig Malouf	2:21:13:55
11	B	98	Zoe	Queensland	Murray 41	12.53	Wayne Millar	2:21:41:16
12	C	SA998	Epsilon	South Australia	Van de Stadt Forna 37	11.50	Michael Tromp	2:22:40:18
13	A	C1	Brindabella	New South Wales	Jutson 79	24.08	George Snow	2:23:17:27
14	C	294	Love & War	New South Wales	Sparkman & Stephens S&S 47	14.21	Peter Kurts	2:23:53:05
15	C	327	Zeus II	New South Wales	Joubert Currawong 30	9.00	James Dunstan	3:00:16:30
16	C	4057	Aurora	New South Wales	Farr 40	12.19	Jim Holley	3:00:22:02
17	B	800	Vitesse	Tasmania	Farr Beneteau 40.7	11.92	Robert Howie	3:01:31:25
18	C	S4440	Midnight Rambler II	(Victoria (state)) Victoria	Farr 40	12.24	Dennis Millikan	3:01:49:05
19	B	B52	B52	Tasmania	Murray Burns Dovell Sydney 41	12.49	Hughie Lewis	3:04:44:20
20	B	8333	Red Rock Communications	New South Wales	Hick 30	8.90	Christopher Bowling	3:05:24:41
21	C	3709	Lady Penrhyn	New South Wales	Swarbrick 36	11.10	Paul Jones	3:05:28:58
22	C	A8	Mirrabooka	Tasmania	Frers 47	13.40	John Bennetto	3:06:07:29
23	C	SM596	Breakaway	(Victoria (state)) Victoria	Swanson 36	10.97	Martin Power	3:06:43:02
24	C	S110	Brindabella II	(Victoria (state)) Victoria	Adams 11	11.08	Roger Sayers	3:12:30:09
25	C	5891	Komatsu Blue Lady	New South Wales	Challenger 39	11.88	Shane Kearns; Jacqui Begbie	3:13:55:05
26	C	6911	Paea II	New Zealand	Mull 40	12.18	Rick Smith	3:18:44:59
DNF	A	M4	Cadibarra	(Victoria (state)) Victoria	Jones Hart 42	12.93	Nigel Jones	Retired-Sail Damage
DNF	A	8833	Sting	New South Wales	Farr 49	15.28	Terry Mullens	Retired-Rigging Damage
DNF	B	8889	Hollywood Boulevard	New South Wales	Farr 52	15.85	Ray Roberts	Retired-Mast Damage
DNF	A	YC1000	SAP Ausmaid	South Australia	Farr 47	14.47	Kevan Pearce	Retired-Broken Mast
DNF	A	SWE1004	Rush	Sweden	Murray Burns Dovell Sydney Turbo 40	12.50	David Falt	Retired-Electrical Issues
DNF	B	5995	Nips N Tux	New South Wales	Jeppersen IMX40	12.10	Howard de Torres	Retired-Engine Issues
DNF	A	4100	Terra Firma	New South Wales	Murray MBD 41	12.45	Stewart Niemann; Peter Bartels	Retired-Crew Member Injury
DNF	C	5438	Panache	New South Wales	Lavranos 36	11.15	Dennis Krawchuk	Retired-Electrical Issues
