= Volvo Baltic Race =

- First held: 2003
- Last held: 2004
- Classes: VO60
- Venue: Baltic Sea
- Champions: SonyEricsson; Thomas Blixt

Volvo Baltic Race was a yacht race held in the Baltic Sea, sponsored by Volvo. It has been held in 2003 and 2004 as training series for VO60 yachts, targeting the Volvo Ocean Race.

== 2003 ==
Seven yachts participated: Atea (1997–98 Whitbread Round the World Race Innovation Kvaerner), Challenge of Netsurvey (2001–02 Volvo Ocean Race Team News Corp), Elanders/Ten Celsius (1997–98 Whitbread Round the World Race Silk Cut), Nilörn (1993–94 Whitbread Round the World Race Winston), Pontona Youth (1997–98 Whitbread Round the World Race Heineken), RS (2001–02 Volvo Ocean Race Team SEB), SonyEricsson (Assa Abloy trial boat).

=== Legs ===
Date	Event	Distance
21 June	Eckenförde Race	25 NM
22 June	Kiel In-Port Race	8 NM
23–26 June	Kiel–Sandhamn	470 NM
29 June – 1 July	Accenture Gotland Runt	340 NM
2 July	Sandhamn In-Port Race	8 NM
2–5 July	Sandhamn–Marstrand	510 NM

=== Results ===
Results of individual races
Pos	Boat name	Crew	Club
1	RS	Erle Williams	Royal Swedish Yacht Club
2	SonyEricsson	Thomas Blixt	Royal Swedish Yacht Club
3	Challenge of Netsurvey	Matthew Humphries	Royal Swedish Yacht Club
4	Elanders/Ten Celsius	Hans Wallén	Royal Gothenburg Yacht Club
5	Nilörn	Frederik Frejme	Royal Swedish Yacht Club
6	Atea	Jan Mortensen	SGYF
7	Pontona Youth	Thomas Dahl Jensen	Aarhus Yacht Club

== 2004 ==
The 2004 Volvo Baltic Race, for the SEB Trophy was a three-week sprint version of Volvo Ocean Race. It was either taking part in, or be in port at the same time, as three of Northern Europe's biggest events: Kiel Week, Germany, the Swedish Match Cup in Marstrand, Sweden, and the Accenture Gotland Runt. Initiator was Viamare, the Swedish yacht and hotel conglomerate.

Five yachts participated: Avant (1997–98 Whitbread Round the World Race Swedish Match), AV-Teknik (1997–98 Whitbread Round the World Race Chessie Racing), JMS Next Generation (1997–98 Whitbread Round the World Race Silk Cut), SonyEricsson (2001–02 Volvo Ocean Race Assa Abloy), Team Elanders (2001–02 Volvo Ocean Race Team News Corp).

=== Legs ===
Date	Event
19 June	In-Port Race
20 June	Gothenburg–Copenhagen
23 June	Copenhagen–Kiel
25 June	In-Port Race
26 June	Kiel–Warnemünde–Sandhamn
4–6 July	Round Gotland Race
7 July	Sandhamn In-Port Race

=== Results ===
Results of individual races
Pos	Boat name	Crew	Club
1	SonyEricsson	Thomas Blixt	Royal Swedish Yacht Club
2	Team Elanders	Matthew Humphries	Royal Swedish Yacht Club
3	Avant	Mikael Lundh	Royal Swedish Yacht Club
4	JMS Next Generation	Kjell-Inge Heiberg	Royal Norwegian Yacht Club
5	AV-Teknik	Marko Murtic	Croatia

== See also ==
- Volvo Ocean Race
