= Stu Bannatyne =

New Zealand sailor

Stu Bannatyne (born 20 April 1971) is a New Zealand sailor who has competed in eight Volvo Ocean Races. He has won four of those eight.

Born in Christchurch, Bannatyne won the Volvo Ocean Race (then known as the Whitbread Round the World Race) in his first attempt, when he sailed on NZ Endeavour during the 1993–94 Whitbread Round the World Race.

In the 1997–98 race, Bannatyne sailed on Silk Cut which placed fourth. He sailed on Illbruck Challenge when it won the 2001–02 Volvo Ocean Race, before sailing on movistar in the 2005–06 event.

Bannatyne won the event for a third time when he sailed with Ericsson 4 during the 2008–09 race, before joining the Team New Zealand entry, Camper Lifelovers, for the 2011–12 Volvo Ocean Race.

He was the coach for Team Alvimedica in the 2014–15 Volvo Ocean Race, before joining the crew for leg 5 of the race. He sailed on Dongfeng Race Team when it won the 2017–18 Volvo Ocean Race.

He has also sailed in eight Fastnet Races, three Transpacific Yacht Races and in 11 Sydney to Hobart Yacht Races.

His brother, James Bannatyne, played for the New Zealand national football team, the All Whites. His other brother, Grant Bannatyne, is a successful architect, notably for his involvement on The Shard with Renzo Piano's office.
