= Neal McDonald =

British sailor (born 1963)

Neal McDonald (born 22 July 1963) is a British sailor who has competed in seven Volvo Ocean Races.

== Sailing career ==
Born in Brighton, McDonald is a qualified naval architect and a member of the Royal Corps of Naval Constructors. He represented Great Britain at the 1988 Summer Olympics, sailing a Flying Dutchman with Roger Yeoman. They placed sixth in the event.

He then won the 1989 International 14 World Championship with his brother, Duncan McDonald before campaigning in the 49er class, becoming European Champion.

McDonald first sailed in the Whitbread Round the World Race during the 1993-94 event on Fortuna. The boat broke its mast twice in the first 24 hours of the race, and ended up retiring.

At the 1995 Louis Vuitton Cup, McDonald was the mainsail trimmer and tactician for Sydney ’95.

He competed in the 1997–98 Whitbread Round the World Race on Silk Cut before sailing The Race in 2000/1 aboard Grant Dalton's Club Med. Club Med won The Race.

He then briefly joining GBR Challenge to help them prepare for the 2003 Louis Vuitton Cup. He left the team to concentrate on preparation for the 2001–02 Volvo Ocean Race, which he sailed with Assa Abloy. McDonald was promoted to skipper of Assa Abloy at the end of the first leg, replacing Roy Heiner. With co-skipper Mark Rudiger, Assa Abloy finished second, winning three of the legs - including leg 3 which was the 2001 Sydney to Hobart Yacht Race. His wife, Lisa McDonald, was the skipper of another entrant, Amer Sports Too.

For the 2005–06 Volvo Ocean Race, McDonald was the skipper of the Ericsson Racing Team. Ericsson Racing Team was beset by technical problems and, after three poor legs, McDonald was demoted to watch captain for leg 5, being replaced by John Kostecki. Following the leg, McDonald was promoted back to skipper for the rest of the race.

He then joined Victory Challenge for the 2007 Louis Vuitton Cup, where he was their traveller and strategist. He was then a watch captain with Green Dragon Racing Team for the 2008–09 Volvo Ocean Race.

McDonald completed his sixth Volvo Ocean Race with Team Telefónica in 2011-12, again as a watch captain. Following the race he announced his retirement.

He accepted an on-shore role for the 2014–15 Volvo Ocean Race, being appointed the performance manager for Azzam. However, he joined the sailing crew for leg 3, replacing an injured Phil Harmer.

He has been appointed the sports and performance director of Mapfre for the 2017–18 Volvo Ocean Race.
