= Matthew Humphries =

British sailor

Matt Humphries
Personal information
- Full name: Matthew Humphries
- Nationality: British
- Born: 21 July 1971 (age 54)

Sailing career
- Sport: Sailing
- Class(es): VO60, VO70

Matthew "Matt" Humphries (born 21 July 1971) is a British sailor. He participated in the Volvo Ocean Race five times: in 1989–90 with With Integrity, 1993–94 as skipper of Reebok/Dolphin & Youth, 1997–98 with America's Challenge and Swedish Match, 2001–02 with Team SEB and Team News Corp, and 2005–06 with Brunel.

He was 18 when he sailed With Integrity, becoming the youngest ever person to sail in the race.

In 2002, due to a conflict with skipper Gurra Krantz, Humphries was forced to resign the VOR Yacht team SOB.
