= Roger Nilson =

Swedish sailor and physician (born 1949)

Personal information
- Born: 5 March 1949 (age 77)

Sailing career
- Sport: Sailing
- Class: VO60

Roger Nilson (born 5 March 1949) is a Swedish sailor and physician. He has competed in the Volvo Ocean Race seven times: he sailed with Alaska Eagle in 1981–82, Drum in 1985–86, The Card in 1989–90, Intrum Justitia in 1993–94, Swedish Match in 1997–98, Amer Sports One in 2001–02, Telefónica Black in 2008–09.
