= Bouwe Bekking =

Dutch sailor

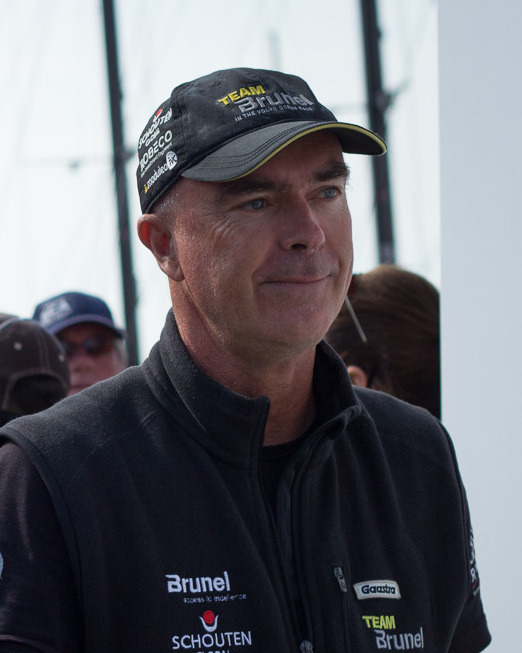

Personal information
- Full name: Bouwe Bekking
- Nationality: Dutch
- Born: 17 June 1963 (age 63) Deventer, Netherlands

Bouwe Bekking (born 17 June 1963) is a Dutch sailor who has sailed in eight Volvo Ocean Races.

Born in Deventer, Bekking first sailed the race during the 1985–86 Whitbread Round the World Race, on board Philips Innovator. He then sailed on Winston during the 1993–94 race, on Merit Cup during the 1997–98 race and on Amer Sports One during the 2001–02 Volvo Ocean Race.

He skippered movistar in the 2005–06 Volvo Ocean Race, finishing sixth, but tragedy struck when Bouwe had to make the call to abandon ship as the boat's keel started swinging on its mount in the Altlantic leg. The team expanded into a two boat challenge for the 2008–09 Volvo Ocean Race. Bekking skippered Telefónica Blue, which finished third.

He skippered Team Brunel in the 2014–15 Volvo Ocean Race, finishing second. In the 2017–18 Volvo Ocean Race, Bekking competed in his eighth Volvo Ocean Race, again skippering Team Brunel finishing third place. He has gained the title: 'The Volvo Ocean Race Legend'.
