= Jan Dekker (sailor) =

French/South African sailor

Jan Dekker is a French/South African sailor who has competed in multiple Volvo Ocean Races and America's Cups.

He sailed in the 1995 Louis Vuitton Cup in San Diego with the France America 95 challenge, before sailing on Silk Cut during the 1997–98 Whitbread Round the World Race. He then competed in The Race on the winner, Club Med.

He then sailed on Team Tyco in the 2001–02 Volvo Ocean Race, which also included the 2000 Sydney to Hobart Yacht Race.

For the 2005–06 Volvo Ocean Race, he was on board the winner ABN AMRO I. as well as bowman, he was the onboard medic.

He has had two attempts at the Jules Verne Trophy with Groupama 3. In 2008 the boat capsized, before they were successful in 2010.

In 2006 Dekker joined Alinghi. He was involved in their 2007 America's Cup victory, and sailed on Alinghi 5 when it lost the 2010 America's Cup.

He joined Oracle Racing in 2013, where he sailed on their AC45 and was a rescue diver during the 2013 America's Cup.
