= Rick Dodson =

New Zealand sailor

Personal information
- Full name: Richard Dodson
- Born: 19 February 1959 (age 67)

Sport
- Country: New Zealand
- Sport: Sailing

Richard Dodson (born 19 February 1959) is a visually impaired New Zealand sailor. He has won several world championships in sailing, including but not limited to two America's Cups and an Admiral's Cup. Dodson also competed in the 2016 Summer Paralympics.

== Accomplishments ==
Year	GOLD	Position	Name	Notes
1979	World Champion – Tonsberg			OK dinghy class.
1982	World Champion – Melbourne			OK dinghy class.
1987	Admiral's Cup	Skipper	Gold Corp	
1988	One Ton Cup – San Francisco	Skipper	Propaganda	
1990	Southern Cross Cup – Sydney	Skipper		
1992	One Ton Cup	Tactician	Propaganda	
1995	America's Cup – San Diego	Strategist	Black Magic	
1996	J Boats World Champion- Cowes	Tactician	Endeavour	
2000	Kenwood Cup- Hawaii	Skipper	Big Apple	
2000	America's Cup – Auckland	Strategist		

== Sailing career ==
Dodson joined Team New Zealand and sailed on NZL 32 in the afterguard during their 1995 America's Cup win. He sailed in Team New Zealand's 2000 America's Cup defense before joining OneWorld Challenge for the 2003 Louis Vuitton Cup.

While preparing for the 2003 America's Cup, he sailed on Team Tyco in leg 3 of the 2001–02 Volvo Ocean Race. Leg 3 included the 2001 Sydney to Hobart Yacht Race.

In 2013 he became involved with Kiwi Gold Sailing, a group of Paralympians qualifying in a Sonar for the 2016 Paralympics. The team originally included fellow America's Cup veteran David Barnes, who later had to withdraw.

As Skipper, he represented New Zealand at the 2016 Summer Paralympics, sailing with Andrew May and Chris Sharp in a Sonar. The team placed fourth in the event.

== Personal life ==
In 1997, Dodson found out he had multiple sclerosis. However, he only informed fellow sailor Jeremy Scantlebury during the 2000 campaign. Despite worsening eyesight, Dodson continued to sail, and has subsequently participated in the 2016 Summer Paralympics.
