= Sharon Ferris =

New Zealand and Canadian sailor

Sharon Marie Ferris (born 17 January 1974 in Scarborough, Ontario, Canada) is an Olympic sailor for New Zealand.

Ferris competed at the 1996 and 2004 Olympics.

She sailed on Amer Sports Too in the 2001–02 Volvo Ocean Race.
