= David Witt (sailor) =

Australian sailor (born 1971)

David Neil Witt (born 5 March 1971) is an Australian sailor who has competed in multiple Volvo Ocean Races.

Witt attended Newington College from 1984 until 1989.

== Sailing career ==
Born in Sydney, Witt sailed on Innovation Kvaerner during the 1997–98 Whitbread Round the World Race.

Winner of Multiple (unspecified) World Sailing Titles

He has appeared in over 20 Sydney to Hobart Yacht Races. He is the skipper of Scallywag, a 100 ft super maxi which he helped to design.

He is the skipper of Team Sun Hung Kai/Scallywag in the 2017–18 Volvo Ocean Race.

In 2025 race SHK Scallywag placed third in line honours with Witt commenting "I reckon I'm done. [...] That's it for me” after his 27th Sydney to Hobart Yacht Race.
