= Robert Salthouse =

New Zealand sailor

Robert Salthouse (born 5 December 1965) is a New Zealand sailor who has sailed in multiple Volvo Ocean Races and America's Cups.

Salthouse joined New Zealand Challenge and sailed in the 1987 Louis Vuitton Cup and on KZ 1 during the 1988 America's Cup. He sailed with the team again in the 1992 Louis Vuitton Cup.

He sailed with Team Tyco in the 2001–02 Volvo Ocean Race.

Salthouse joined Team New Zealand for the 2007 Louis Vuitton Cup.

He then sailed on Puma Racing's Il Mostro during the 2008–09 Volvo Ocean Race. He then briefly sailed with Mascalzone Latino in the Louis Vuitton Trophy regattas, before joining Team New Zealand's campaign for the 2011–12 Volvo Ocean Race, sailing on Camper Lifelovers.

He sailed with Team Vestas Wind in the 2014–15 Volvo Ocean Race. The boat was shipwrecked during the second leg of the race.

He managed Team New Zealand's fairings program in the 2013 America's Cup and their wing programme in the 2017 America's Cup.
