= Richard Meacham =

New Zealand sailor

Richard Meacham is a New Zealand sailor who has competed in multiple America's Cups.

A bowman and a sailmaker, he joined Team New Zealand before the 2000 America's Cup defence.

He then sailed with Team Tyco in the 2001–02 Volvo Ocean Race before re-joining Team New Zealand for the 2003 and 2007 America's Cup. He sailed on Rán during the 2009 Sydney to Hobart Yacht Race, and also raced with Team New Zealand in the 2011 Extreme Sailing Series, and the 2013 America's Cup.

He was the only one of three of the sailing team that remained with Team New Zealand after the 2013 event, sailing in the 2015–16 America's Cup World Series. He was the platform co-ordinator when Team New Zealand won the 2017 America's Cup.
