= Team Tyco =

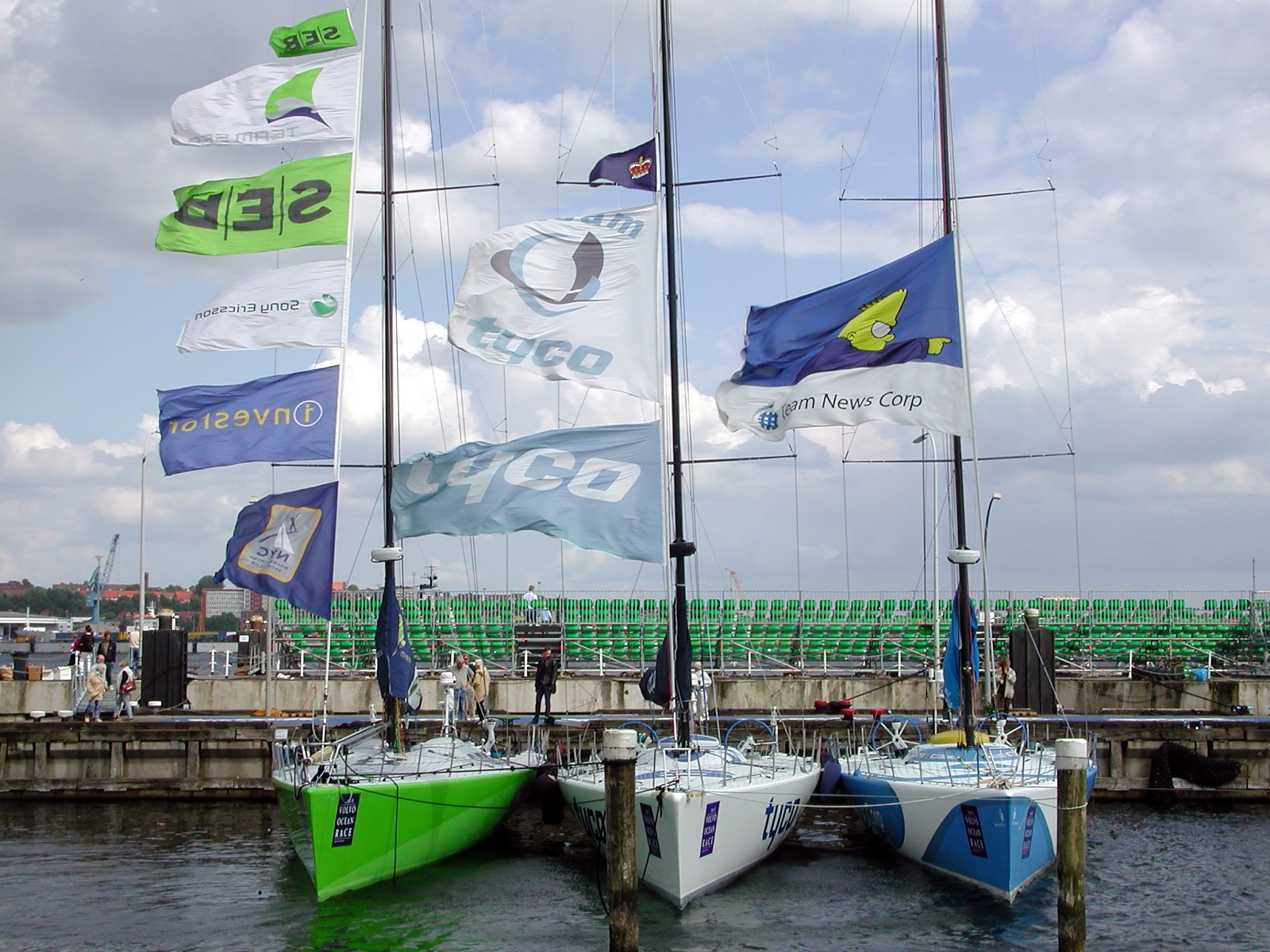
- Team SEB, Team Tyco (center) and Team News Corp during 2001–02 Volvo Ocean Race.
- Other names: Team Heiner 1
- Nation: Bermuda
- Class: Volvo Ocean 60
- Sail no: BER 2001
- Designer(s): Farr Yacht Design
- Builder: Eric Goetz Custom Sailboats

Racing career
- Skippers: Kevin Shoebridge

Specifications
- Displacement: 13,500 Kg/29,700 Lbs
- Length: 19.40 m/64 ft
- Beam: 5.25 m/17.2 ft
- Draft: 3.75 m/12.3 ft
- Crew: Jim Close, Jan Dekker, Richard Dodson, David Endean, Damian Foxall, Steve Hayles, Brad Jackson, Richard Meacham, Daniel Spanchis, Timothy Powell, Mike Quilter, Guy Salter, Rob Salthouse, Kevin Shoebridge (skipper), Grant Spanhake, Jonathan Swain

Team Tyco is a Bermudian Volvo Ocean 60 yacht, designed by Farr Yacht Design in 2000, and built by Eric Goetz Custom Sailboats in Rhode Island. She competed in the 2001–02 Volvo Ocean Race and finished fourth overall, skippered by Kevin Shoebridge.

The yacht is currently owned by Roy Heiner and has been brought back into racing condition, and now has the name "Team Heiner One". It is usually located in Den Helder (Netherlands), or Portimão (South Portugal). Team Heiner mostly uses the boat for corporate events and management training, but also for competitions such as the Antwerp Race or a spectacular round around Ireland.

Team ABN AMRO used the VO60 for training and preparations for the Volvo Ocean Race 2005-2006.

== Crew ==
Name	Country	Role
Jim Close	AUS	Helmsman/trimmer
Jan Dekker	FRA	Bow
Richard Dodson	NZL	
David Endean	NZL	Mast
Damian Foxall	IRL	Pit
Steve Hayles	GBR	Navigator
Brad Jackson	NZL	Watch Leader
Richard Meacham	NZL	
Daniel Spanchis	CHE	Helmsman/trimmer
Timothy Powell	GBR	Watch Leader
Mike Quilter	NZL	
Guy Salter	GBR	Bow
Rob Salthouse	NZL	Helmsman/trimmer
Kevin Shoebridge	NZL	Skipper
Grant Spanhake	NZL	Helmsman/trimmer
Jonathan Swain	RSA	Helmsman/trimmer
