= ABN AMRO I =

Volvo Open 70 yacht

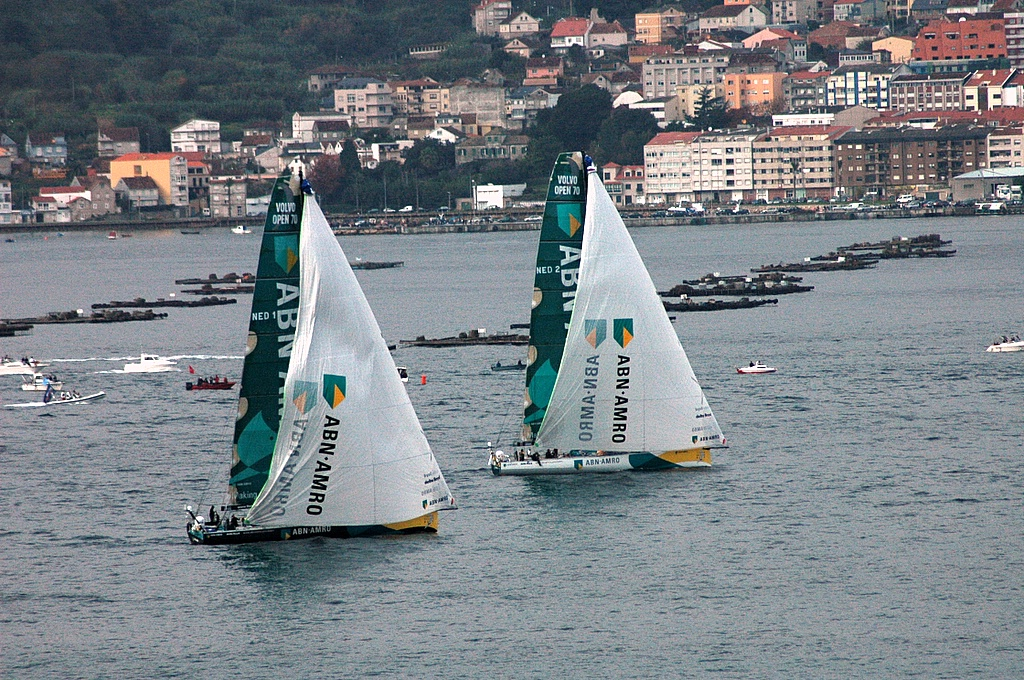
- ABN AMRO I (left) together with ABN AMRO II at the start of 2005–06 Volvo Ocean Race.
- Other names: Team Delta Lloyd
- Nation: Netherlands
- Class: Volvo Open 70
- Sail no: NED–1
- Designer(s): Juan Kouyoumdjian
- Builder: Killian Busche; Lelystad, Netherlands
- Launched: August 2005

Racing career
- Skippers: Mike Sanderson; Ger O'Rourke
- Notable victories: 2005–06 Volvo Ocean Race

ABN AMRO I (also Team Delta Lloyd) is a Volvo Open 70 yacht. She won the 2005–06 Volvo Ocean Race skippered by Mike Sanderson.

She also competed in the 2008–09 Volvo Ocean Race as Team Delta Lloyd skippered by Ger O'Rourke.

== 2005-06 crew ==
The line-up was led by skipper Mike Sanderson and technical director Roy Heiner and included Brad Jackson - Watch Captain (NZL) (New Zealand Endeavour/Merit Cup/Tyco), Tony Mutter - Helmsman Trimmer (NZL) (Swedish Match/Team SEB) David Endean - Trimmer Pitman (NZL) (Tyco) Jan Dekker - Bowman (FRA/RSA) (Merit Cup/Tyco) Robert Greenhalgh - Helmsman Trimmer (UK) Justin Slattery - Bowman (IRE) (News Corp) and Stan Honey - Navigator (USA). Replacement crew included Mark Christensen (NZL), Sidney Gavignet (FRA) and Brian Thompson (GBR).
