= Volvo Ocean 65 Team JAJO =

Team Brunel
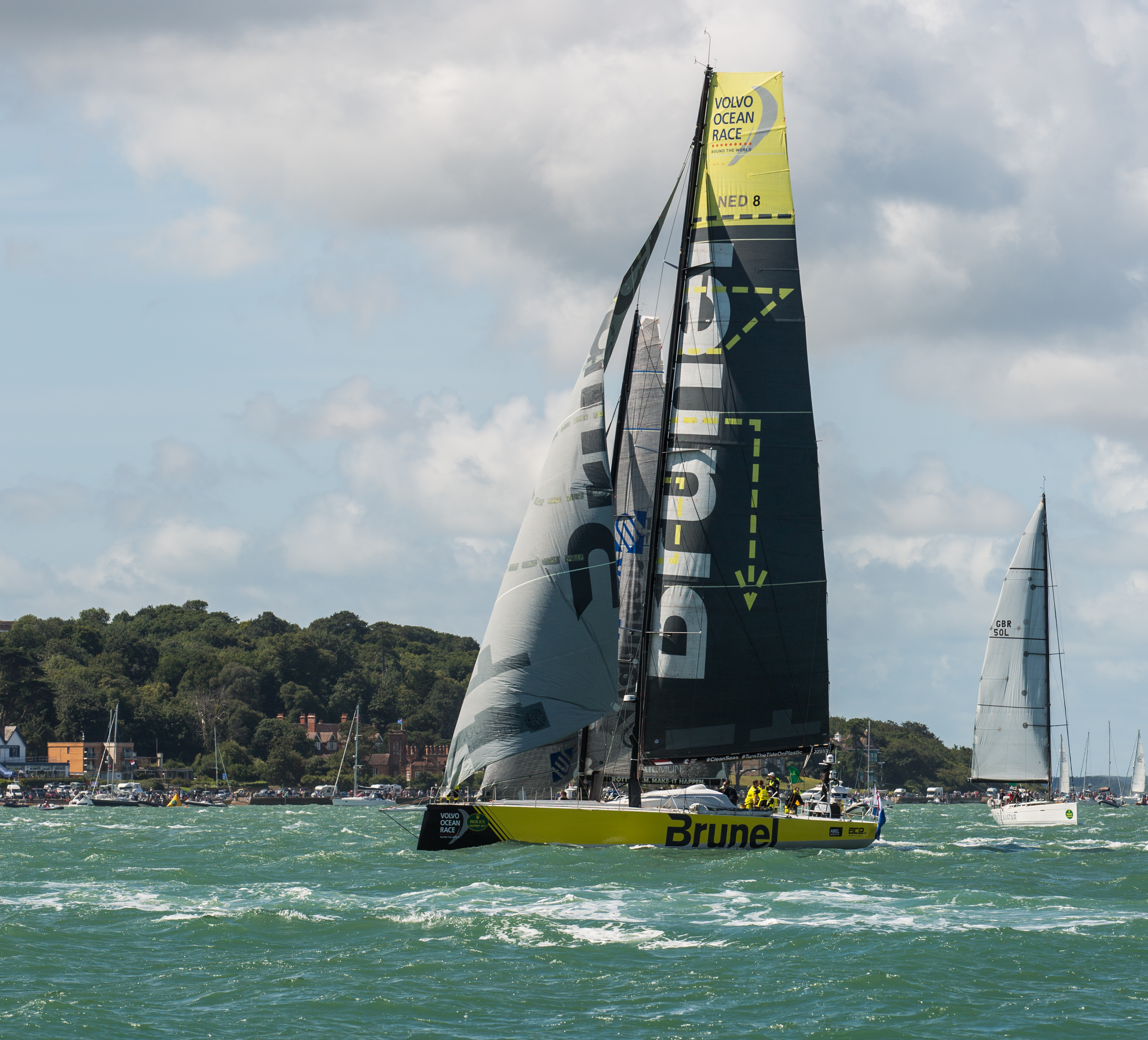
- Team Brunel at the Fastnet weekend 2017
- Nation: Netherlands
- Class: Volvo Ocean 65
- Sail no: NED 8
- Designer(s): Farr Yacht Design
- Builder: Green Marine LTD, Decision SA, Multiplast, Persico SPA
- Launched: 2014

Racing career
- Skippers: Bouwe Bekking (2014-15)(2017-18); Jelmer van Beek (2023)

Specifications
- Type: Monohull racing yacht
- Length: 20.37 m
- Mast height: 30.30 m
- Sail area: 163 m2
- Crew: 9

Team Brunel is a Volvo Ocean 65 yacht. She finished 3rd in the 2017–18 Volvo Ocean Race skippered by Bouwe Bekking and navigated by Andrew Cape.

She finished second in the 2014–15 Volvo Ocean Race, also skippered by Bouwe Bekking. The team is backed by Dutch project management company Brunel International, and sponsored by ACE, Abel Sensors and Embrace Tech Startups. Brunel International are Volvo Ocean Race veterans, having had their first involvement in 1997-98.

For the 2023 The Ocean Race she was renamed Team JAJO.

== Team Brunel ==
=== 2014–15 Volvo Ocean Race ===
==== Crew ====
The 2014-15 crew consisted of:

- (Netherlands) Bouwe Bekking (skipper)
- (New Zealand) Adam Minoprio (crew member)
- (Netherlands) Dirk de Ridder (crew member)
- (Australia) Andrew Cape (navigator)
- (Netherlands) Gerd-Jan Poortman (crew member)
- (Denmark) Jens Dolmer (crew member)
- (Belgium) Louis Balcaen (crew member)
- (Spain) Pablo Arrarte (crew member)
- (Lithuania) Rokas Milevičius (crew member)
- (Netherlands) Stefan Coppers, (onboard reporter)

==== Results ====
Team Brunel finished second in both the overall standings and the in-port series.

Overall standings

Leg 1 (Spain) (South Africa)	Leg 2 (South Africa) (United Arab Emirates)	Leg 3 (United Arab Emirates) (China)	Leg 4 (China) (New Zealand)	Leg 5 (New Zealand) (Brazil)	Leg 6 (Brazil) (United States)	Leg 7 (United States) (Portugal)	Leg 8 (Portugal) (France)	Leg 9 (France) (Sweden)	Total
3	1	5	5	4	3	1	5	2	29

In-port series

Ali (Spain)	CT (South Africa)	AD (United Arab Emirates)	San (China)	Auc (New Zealand)	Ita (Brazil)	NP (United States)	Lis (Portugal)	Lor (France)	Got (Sweden)	Total
4	2	2	4	2	1	5	5	6	1	32

=== 2017–18 Volvo Ocean Race ===
The 2017–18 crew consisted of:

Onboard

- (Netherlands) Bouwe Bekking (skipper)
- (United Kingdom) Annie Lush (trimmer)
- (United Kingdom) Abby Ehler (crew member)
- (Australia) Andrew Cape (Navigator)
- (Belgium) Louis Balcaen (helmsman)
- (New Zealand) Peter Burling (helmsman, watch captain and trimmer)
- (Australia) Kyle Langford (trimmer)
- (Netherlands) Carlo Huisman (helmsman, watch captain and trimmer)
- (Italy) Alberto Bolzan (helmsman, watch captain and trimmer)
- (Argentina) Maciel Cicchetti (helmsman, watch captain and trimmer)

On-shore

- (Netherlands) Anje-Marijcke van Boxtel (team coach)

==== Results ====
Team Brunel finished third in both the overall standings and the in-port series.

Overall standings

Leg 1 (Spain) (Portugal)	Leg 2 (Portugal) (South Africa)	Leg 3 (South Africa) (Australia)	Leg 4 (Australia) (Hong Kong)	Leg 5 (Hong Kong) (China)	Leg 6 (China) (New Zealand)	Leg 7 (New Zealand) (Brazil)	Leg 8 (Brazil) (United States)	Leg 9 (United States) (Wales)	Leg 10 (Wales) (Sweden)	Leg 11 (Sweden) (Netherlands)	Bonus	Total
2	4	8	3	1	2	14	6	14	7	4	4	69

In-port series

Ali (Spain)	Lis (Portugal)	CT (South Africa)	HK (Hong Kong)	Gzu (China)	Auc (New Zealand)	Ita (Brazil)	NP (United States)	Car (Wales)	Got (Sweden)	DH (Netherlands)	Total
4	7	2	4	6	3	3	7	5	2	7	50

== Team JAJO ==
=== 2023 The Ocean Race ===
The 2023 crew are:

- (Netherlands) Jelmer van Beek (skipper)
- (Netherlands) Laura van Veen (crew member)
- (Netherlands) Jorden van Rooijen (bowman)
- (Netherlands) Rutger Vos (boat captain, trimmer)
- (Netherlands) Max Deckers (navigator)
- (Netherlands) Bouwe Bekking (watch leader)
- (Poland) Maja Micińska (trimmer)
- (Spain) Simbad Quiroga (helmsman, trimmer)
- (United Kingdom) Joy Eilish Fitzgerald (crew member)
- (United Kingdom) Gregg Parker (grinder)
- (Netherlands) Brend Schuil (onboard reporter)
