= La Poste (yacht) =

- Nation: France
- Class: Maxi
- Designer(s): Bruce Farr
- Launched: 1993

Racing career
- Skippers: Daniel Mallé; Éric Tabarly; Giorgio Cerasuolo

La Poste is the name given to 2 sailing boats. The first is a Jeanneau First 51 mass production boat. The second one is a "Maxi" sailing boat designed by Bruce Farr and built for the French postal service. First one participated in the 1989-90 edition of the Whitbread race, with Daniel Mallé as a skipper, the second one participated in the 1993-94 edition with Daniel Mallé and Éric Tabarly who replaced Daniel Malle as skipper after the second leg in the Whitbread Round the World Race. The crew of the first La Poste was composed by postal service employees. During Leg 2 of the race while La Poste was leading, the team decided to turn around to answer a distress signal from another boat, Brooksfield, sailing into 50-knot winds.

In 2012 La poste participated in the Barcolana regatta with a team composed by member of Mascalzone Latino and 8 boys and girls with Down Syndrome..The documentary "The wind force", directed by Emilia Ricasoli and Alessio Muzi and aired on the Italian broadcaster La7, tells the team's preparation and the subsequent participation in the regatta. Since 2013 Giorgio Cerasuolo is the Captain of La Poste. In 2014 participated in the Gran Prix del Atlántico and set a record time from Lanzarote to Santa Marta in 15 days.

As of 2017 La Poste is in Linton Bay, Panama, and is for sale.
