= Reebok/Dolphin & Youth =

Volvo Ocean 60 yacht

- Nation: United Kingdom
- Class: Volvo Ocean 60

Racing career
- Skippers: Matt Humphries

Reebok/Dolphin & Youth is a Volvo Ocean 60 yacht. She finished eighth in the W60 class of the 1993–94 Whitbread Round the World Race skippered by Matt Humphries.
