= Galicia '93 Pescanova =

- Nation: Spain
- Class: Volvo Ocean 60

Racing career
- Skippers: Javier Gandara
- Notable victories: 1993 Fastnet Race (l.h.)

Galicia '93 Pescanova is a Volvo Ocean 60 yacht. She finished third in the W60 class of the 1993–94 Whitbread Round the World Race skippered by Javier Gandara.
