= Assa Abloy (yacht) =

Swedish yacht

- Other names: SonyEricsson
- Nation: Sweden
- Class: Volvo Ocean 60
- Designer(s): Bruce Farr
- Launched: 2001

Racing career
- Skippers: Roy Heiner; Neal McDonald
- Notable victories: 2001 Sydney–Hobart (l.h.); 2004 Volvo Baltic Race

Specifications
- Length: 18.3 m (60 ft) (LOA)

Assa Abloy (also known as SonyEricsson) is a Volvo Ocean 60 yacht that took part in the 2001–02 Volvo Ocean Race where she finished second. She is an 18.3 metres (60 ft) Farr Yacht Design launched in 2001.

Assa Abloy participated in the 2004 Volvo Baltic Race under her new name SonyEricson. She won the competition skippered by Thomas Blixt.
