= Mike Sanderson =

New Zealand sailor

Personal information
- Birth name: Mike Sanderson
- Nickname: Moose
- Born: 29 May 1971 (age 54); Whangārei, New Zealand
- Website: Mike-Sanderson.com

Sport
- Country: New Zealand
- Sport: Sailing

Mike Sanderson (born 29 May 1971) is a New Zealand sailor, perhaps best known for being awarded the prestigious ISAF World Sailor of the Year Award for winning the 2005–06 Volvo Ocean Race as skipper of ABN Amro I. At the age of 35, he became the youngest skipper to ever win a Volvo Ocean Race in the 2005–2006 edition of the race. (Lionel Péan had previously won the Whitbread Round the World Race in 1986, aged 29).

From 2007 to 2010, he was Team Director of Team Origin, a potential British challenger for the 2013 America's Cup.

He returned to skipper Team Sanya (the Irish-Chinese entry in the race) in the 2011–12 Volvo Ocean Race. The boat, formerly known as Telefónica Blue in the 2008–09 Volvo Ocean Race, has been plagued with instrument and hull failures. As of 30 March 2012 the boat is currently being shipped to Miami to be repaired so it can rejoin the race in Leg 7.

== Personal life ==
In 2006, he married British round-the-world yachtswoman Emma Richards in Cowes, UK. He also is the current CEO of Doyle Sails NZ.
