= Heineken (yacht) =

Volvo Ocean 60 Class Yacht

- Other names: Yamaha 1 Pontona Youth
- Nation: United States; Denmark
- Class: Volvo Ocean 60
- Designer(s): Farr Yacht Design
- Builder: Cookson Boats, New Zealand

Racing career
- Skippers: Dawn Riley; Thomas Dahl Jensen

Specifications
- Displacement: 13,500 kg (29,800 lb)
- Length: 18.2 m (60 ft) (LOA)
- Beam: 5.2 m (17 ft)
- Draft: 3.7 m (12 ft)
- Crew: 12

Heineken (also Yamaha 1, Pontona Youth) is a Volvo Ocean 60 yacht. She finished ninth in the W60 class of the 1993–94 Whitbread Round the World Race skippered by Dawn Riley.

== Career ==
Yamaha 1 was the first Whitbread 60 ever built and was used as a trial boat for Ross Field's team. It was built by Cookson Boats in New Zealand. When Yamaha was finished the yacht was leased to American skipper Dawn Riley, who finished ninth among the W60s of the 1993–94 Whitbread Round the World Race having an all-women crew.

Yamaha 1 competed in the 2003 Volvo Baltic Race with the name Pontona Youth and crewed by a Danish youth team skippered by Thomas Dahl Jensen.
