= Odessa (yacht) =

- Nation: Ukraine
- Class: Volvo Ocean 60

Racing career
- Skippers: Anatoly Verba

Odessa (Ukrainian: Одеса 200) is a Volvo Ocean 60 yacht. She finished tenth in the W60 class of the 1993–94 Whitbread Round the World Race skippered by Anatoly Verba.
