= Tokio (yacht) =

- Nation: Japan
- Class: Volvo Ocean 60

Racing career
- Skippers: Chris Dickson

Tokio is a Volvo Ocean 60 yacht. She finished fifth in the W60 class of the 1993–94 Whitbread Round the World Race skippered by Chris Dickson.
