= Volvo Ocean 65 Viva México =

Volvo Ocean 65 yacht

Viva México
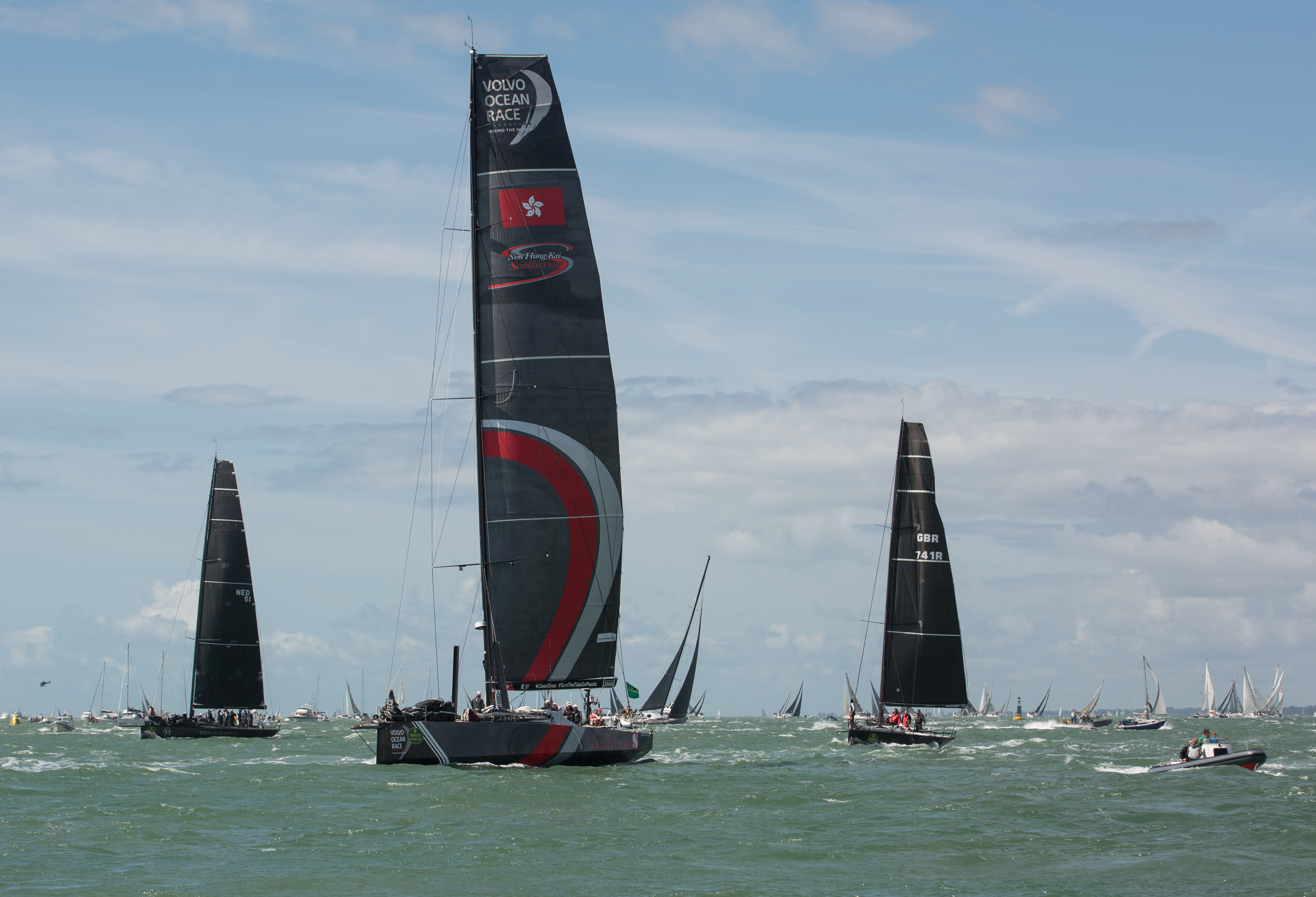
- As Scallywag at the Fastnet weekend 2017
- Nation: Mexico
- Class: Volvo Ocean 65
- Designer(s): Farr Yacht Design
- Builder: Green Marine; Hythe, UK
- Launched: 5 March 2017

Racing career
- Skippers: Ian Walker (2014-15); David Witt (2017-18); Erik Brockmann (2023)
- Notable victories: 2014-15 Volvo Ocean Race; 2017-18: Leg 4

Specifications
- Displacement: 12,500 kg (27,600 lb)
- Length: 20.37 m (66.8 ft) (LOA); 20.00 m (65 ft) (LWL)
- Beam: 5.60 m (18.4 ft)
- Draft: 4.78 m (15.7 ft)
- Mast height: 30.30 m (99.4 ft)
- Crew: 8 (+1 onboard reporter)

The Volvo Ocean 65 class yacht Azzam was built for the Abu Dhabi Ocean Racing to compete at the 2014–15 Volvo Ocean Race. Following this, the boat was refitted and renamed for the 2017–18 Volvo Ocean Race where it competed as Sun Hung Kai/Scallywag. For the 2023 The Ocean Race she was renamed again to Viva México.

== Abu Dhabi Ocean Racing ==
=== 2014–2015 Volvo Ocean Race ===
Skippered by British Olympic medalist Ian Walker the boat won the overall race.

== Sun Hung Kai/Scallywag ==
=== 2017–2018 Volvo Ocean Race ===
The crew consisted of:

- David Witt (AUS) (skipper)
- Alex Gough
- Annemieke Bes (NED)
- Ben Piggotth (AUS)
- John 'Fish' Fisher (GBR)
- Luke Parkinson (GBR)
- Steve Hayles (GBR)
- Tom Clout (AUS)
- António Fontes
- Libby Greenhalgh (GBR)
- Trystan Seal (GBR)

At approximately 13:42 UTC on March 26, 2018, some 1400 nm west of Cape Horn, the team's safety officer John Fisher was knocked overboard when the boat experienced a sudden chinese gybe. It took the team 10 minutes to resolve it. John was knocked overboard by the mainsheet. His teammates' search for him in the harsh conditions of the Southern Ocean was suspended after four hours. He was declared lost at sea. The death of Fisher greatly impacted the rest of the fleet, in particular his skipper, who hadn't sailed without him in 12 years. Fisher's loss was the first tragedy seen by the Ocean Race since Hans Horrevoets' death in the 2005–06 edition.

== Viva México ==
=== 2023 The Ocean Race ===
The crew consisted of:

- (Mexico) Erik Brockmann (skipper)
- (Spain) Jaime Arbones
- (Spain) Carlos Bermúdez
- (Spain) Roberto Bermúdez
- (Netherlands) Annemieke Bes
- (Mexico) Tania Elías Calles
- (Uruguay) Dominique Knüppel
- (Mexico) Juan Luís Medina
- (Mexico) Juan Varela
