= Gunnar Krantz (sailor) =

Swedish sailor

Personal information
- Nickname: Gurra
- Born: Erik Gunnar Krantz; 20 April 1955 (age 71) Sweden

Sailing career
- Sport: Sailing
- Class: VO60

Erik Gunnar "Gurra" Krantz is a Swedish sailor. He skippered the Swedish America's Cup Challenge at the 1992 Louis Vuitton Cup, Swedish Match in the 1997–98 Whitbread Round the World Race and Team SEB in the 2001–02 Volvo Ocean Race

== Achievements ==
As of 27 September 2015

Year	Competition	Venue	Position	Event
1995	Mumm 36 World Championships	Hamble, UK	10th	Mumm 36 class
