= Djuice Dragons =

Norwegian yacht

- Nation: Norway
- Class: Volvo Ocean 60
- Designer(s): Laurie Davidson
- Builder: Cooksons, New Zealand

Racing career
- Skippers: Knut Frostad

Djuice Dragons is a Norwegian Volvo Ocean 60 yacht. She competed in the 2001–02 Volvo Ocean Race and finished sixth, skippered by Knut Frostad.

Djuice Dragons was designed by Laurie Davidson.
