= Brooksfield =

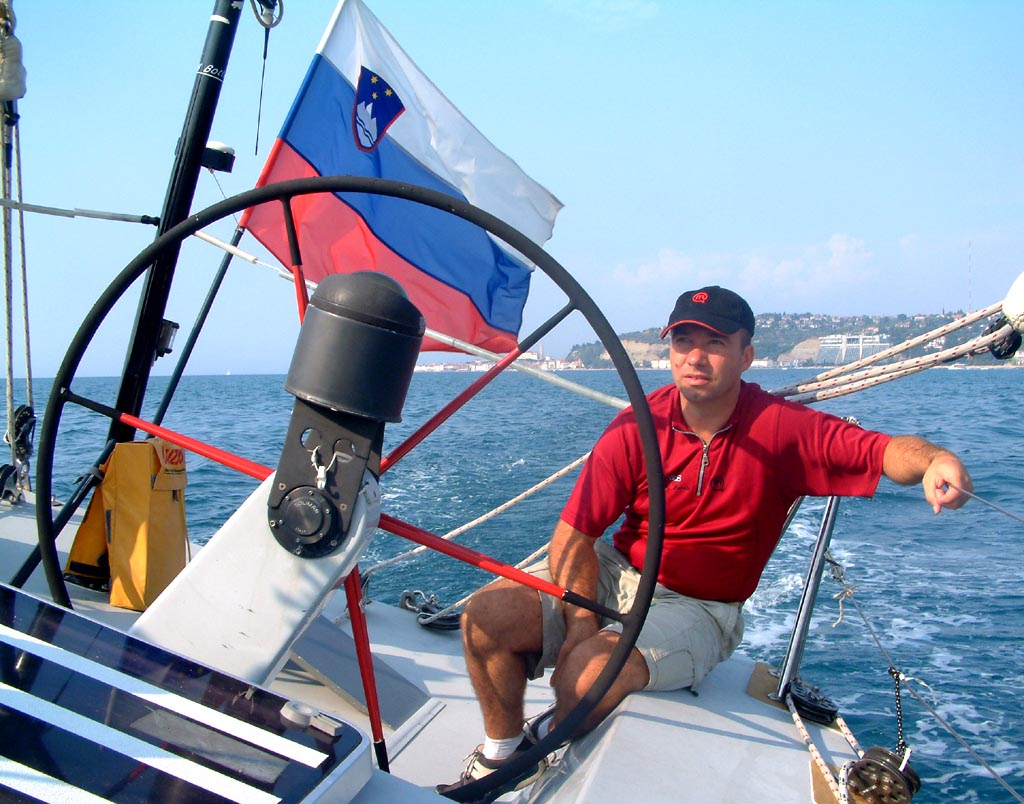
- Other names: Nafta watch Veliki viharnik Clean Sport Too
- Yacht club: Pirat Portorož
- Nation: Italy; Slovenia
- Class: Volvo Ocean 60
- Sail no: SLO–031
- Launched: Venice, Italy, 1992
- Owner(s): Jure Orel
- Fate: active

Racing career
- Skippers: Guido Maisto; Dušan Puh

Specifications
- Displacement: 13 tons
- Length: 19.2 m (63 ft)
- Beam: 5.2 m (17 ft)
- Mast height: 28.0 m (91.9 ft)

Brooksfield is a Volvo Ocean 60 yacht. She finished sixth in the W60 class of the 1993–94 Whitbread Round the World Race skippered by Guido Maisto.

Since 2000, the owner was Mobitel (Slovenian Telekom), who renamed it Veliki viharnik, but currently it is owned by Slovenian businessman Dejan Kovačič.

In 2019 it was bought by Slovene skipper Jure Orel's firm CleanSport Group and renamed Clean Sport Too, to be renamed back in Veliki Viharnik in 2023.

== Career ==
2nd Jadranska regata/Adriatic race (2008) Skipper Dušan Puh Position 1 Group MAXI Finish time 2.5.2008. 20:59:40 Sailed time 32:59:40

4th Jadranska regata/Adriatic race (2010) Skipper Dušan Puh Position 1 Group MAXI Finish time 1.5.2010. 01:00:41 Sailed time 38:00:41

5th Jadranska regata/Adriatic race (2011) Skipper Dušan Puh Position 3 Group MAXI Finish time 30.4.2011. 06:40:54 Sailed time 43:40:54

== Current status ==
After two years long-term storage at the Marina of Portorož, the yacht was moved to the Marina of Koper; the current main sponsor is the town of Koper. Brooksfield won the Diplomatic Regatta 2015 and Skipper Cup 2015, and was 2nd at the Jabuka Regatta 2015 and 3rd at Bernetti 2015.

== Brooksfield on YouTube ==
- Brooksfield (Veliki viharnik) on Fiumanka regatta 2004
- Brooksfield (Veliki viharnik) on Adriatic race 2011
