= 1993–1994 Whitbread Round the World Race =

1993–94 Whitbread Round the World Race
Event title
- Edition: 6th
- Yachts: Whitbread 60; Maxi

Competitors
- Competitors: 15

Results
- Winner: NZ Endeavour

The 1993–94 Whitbread Round the World Race was the sixth edition of the around-the-world sailing event. The race was won by Grant Dalton the maxi 'New Zealand Endeavour'.

As with prior races, the 1993-1994 Whitbread was run to "mixed class" rules. However a new purpose-built Whitbread boat—the W60 was introduced. As with previous years a handicap was applied to different boats based on their race rating. Some W60 competitors were not keen on running both Maxis and W60s together once it became evident some of the old Maxis were only as fast as the W60 class. Some W60 competitors wished to ban Maxis, however this was never realistic given the large investments the Maxi owners had made in the expectation of being able to race. There were also concerns over whether enough new W60 boats would be ready.

Despite the closeness of the finishes, some W60 skippers claimed to be in a 'completely different boat race' to Grant Dalton skippering a maxi.

== Participants ==
Boat	Nation	Class	Skipper
Brooksfield	Italy	Whitbread 60	(Italy) Guido Maisto
Fortuna	Spain	Maxi	(United Kingdom) Lawrie Smith
Heineken	United States	Whitbread 60	(United States) Dawn Riley
Hetman Sahaidachny	Ukraine	Whitbread 60	(Ukraine) Eugene Platon
Galicia '93 Pescanova	Spain	Whitbread 60	(Spain) Javier de la Gandara
Intrum Justitia	Europe	Whitbread 60	(Sweden) Roger Nilson (United Kingdom) Lawrie Smith
La Poste	France	Maxi	(France) Éric Tabarly
Merit Cup	United Kingdom	Maxi	(Switzerland) Pierre Fehlmann
NZ Endeavour	New Zealand	Maxi	(New Zealand) Grant Dalton
Reebok/Dolphin Youth	United Kingdom	Whitbread 60	(United Kingdom) Matthew Humphries
Tokio	Japan	Whitbread 60	(New Zealand) Chris Dickson
Odessa	Ukraine	Whitbread 60	(Ukraine) Anatoly Verba
Uruguay Natural	Uruguay	Maxi	(Uruguay) Gustavo Vanzini
Winston	United States	Whitbread 60	(United States) Dennis Conner (New Zealand) Brad Butterworth
Yamaha	Japan	Whitbread 60	(New Zealand) Ross Field

- Intrum Justitia was originally skippered by Roger Nilson, who was injured on the first leg.

== Route ==
Race route

Event	Start date	Start	Finish	Distance (nmi)	Winner
Leg 1	25 September 1993	(United Kingdom) Southampton	(Uruguay) Punta del Este	5,938	NZ Endeavour
Leg 2	13 November 1993	(Uruguay) Punta del Este	(Australia) Fremantle	7,558	Intrum Justitia
Leg 3	8 January 1994	(Australia) Fremantle	(New Zealand) Auckland	3,272	NZ Endeavour
Leg 4	19 February 1994	(New Zealand) Auckland	(Uruguay) Punta del Este	5,914	NZ Endeavour
Leg 5	2 April 1994	(Uruguay) Punta del Este	(United States) Fort Lauderdale	5,475	Yamaha
Leg 6	21 May 1994	(United States) Fort Lauderdale	(United Kingdom) Southampton	3,818	Tokio

== Results ==
Pos	Class	Class Pos	Sail Number	Yacht	Country	Yacht Type	LOA (Metres)	Skipper	Elapsed Time d:hh:mm:ss
1	Maxi	1	NZL 1	New Zealand Endeavour	New Zealand	Farr 85 Ketch Maxi	26.00	Grant Dalton	120:05:09:23
2	Whitbread 60	1	II	Yamaha	Japan	Farr Whitbread 60	19.81	Ross Field	120:14:55:00
3	Maxi	2	SUI 3333	Merit Cup	Switzerland	Farr 85 Ketch Maxi	25.90	Pierre Fehlmann	121:02:50:47
4	Whitbread 60	2	EUR 1	Intrum Justitia	Europe	Farr Whitbread 60	19.81	Roger Nilson; Lawrie Smith	121:05:26:26
5	Whitbread 60	3	ESP 1993	Galicia '93 Pescanova	Spain	Farr Whitbread 60	19.81	Javier de la Gándara	122:06:12:23
6	Whitbread 60	4	USA 1	Winston	United States	Farr Whitbread 60	19.81	Dennis Conner; Brad Butterworth	122:09:32:09
7	Maxi	3	FRA 1994	La Poste	France	Farr 85 Ketch Maxi	25.90	Daniel Mallé; Éric Tabarly	123:22:54:58
8	Whitbread 60	5	KZ 7	Tokio	Japan	Farr Whitbread 60	19.81	Chris Dickson	128:16:19:48
9	Whitbread 60	6	ITA 12555	Brooksfield	Italy	Bouvet-Petit Whitbread 60	19.19	Guido Maisto	130:04:29:27
10	Whitbread 60	7	UKR 1	Hetman Sahaidachny	Ukraine	Farr Whitbread 60	19.81	Eugene Platon	135:23:17:52
11	Whitbread 60	8	GBR 760R	Dolphin & Youth Challenge-Reebok	(United Kingdom) Great Britain	Humphreys Whitbread 60	19.90	Matthew Humphries	137:21:03:17
12	Whitbread 60	9	US 1	US Women's Challenge-Heineken	United States	Farr Whitbread 60	19.81	Nance Frank; Dawn Riley	138:16:30:51
13	Maxi	4	URU 9000	Uruguay Natural	Uruguay	Frers 81 Sloop Maxi	24.60	Gustavo Vanzini Pons	144:20:17:44
14	Whitbread 60	10	UKR 200	Odessa	Ukraine	Sidenko Whitbread 60	19.60	Anatoly Verba	158:04:34:40
DNF	Maxi	5	E 1992	Fortuna	Spain	Visiers 81 Ketch Maxi	24.80	Lawrie Smith	Retired-Leg 1

Fortuna broke its mast twice in the first 24 hours of the race, and ended up retiring.
