= Eric Goetz =

- Born: January 1, 1949 (age 76)
- Website: GoetzBoats.com

Erich Goetz (born 1949) is a builder of sailing vessels used in the America's Cup, owner of Goetz Custom Boats, and co-founder of the Resolute Racing Shells company. Eric has been known throughout his career as a leader in boatbuilding technology and was one of the first builders to use carbon fiber to increase stiffness and remove weight from racing sailing vessels.

Erich Goetz founded Eric Goetz Custom Sail Boats Inc. d.b.a. "Goetz" in 1975.
