= Knut Frostad =

Norwegian sailor

Knut Mauritz Frostad (born 4 June 1967 in Harstad, Norway) is a Norwegian yachtsman, who has participated in a broad range of world championship level sailing events, including the Volvo Ocean Race and the Olympic Games, the latter in windsurfing.

He has twice participated in the Olympic Games (1988 and 1992) and four times the Volvo Ocean Race, twice as skipper.

In 2004, he won the Scandinavian Nokia Oops Cup and, in 2005, he finished second.

In 2024, he was appointed Executive Chairman of Henri Lloyd.

== Volvo Ocean Race ==
His first participation in 1993-94 VOR was in the Swedish Intrum Justitia which finished second.

In the 1997-98 VOR he was skipper and project founder/director at the Norwegian Innovation Kværner and in the 2001-02 VOR in the Norwegian Djuice Dragons.

In the 2005-06 VOR he was watchplan captain on Southern Ocean legs in the Brazilian Brasil 1.

He was the chief executive for the 2008–09 and the 2011-2012 Volvo Ocean Race, and has returned as the CEO for the 2014-2015 race.

For the 2014-2015 race he led the transformation of the race from an open class rule to a strict one-design class boat race.
