= Team SEB =

Swedish Volvo Ocean 60 yacht

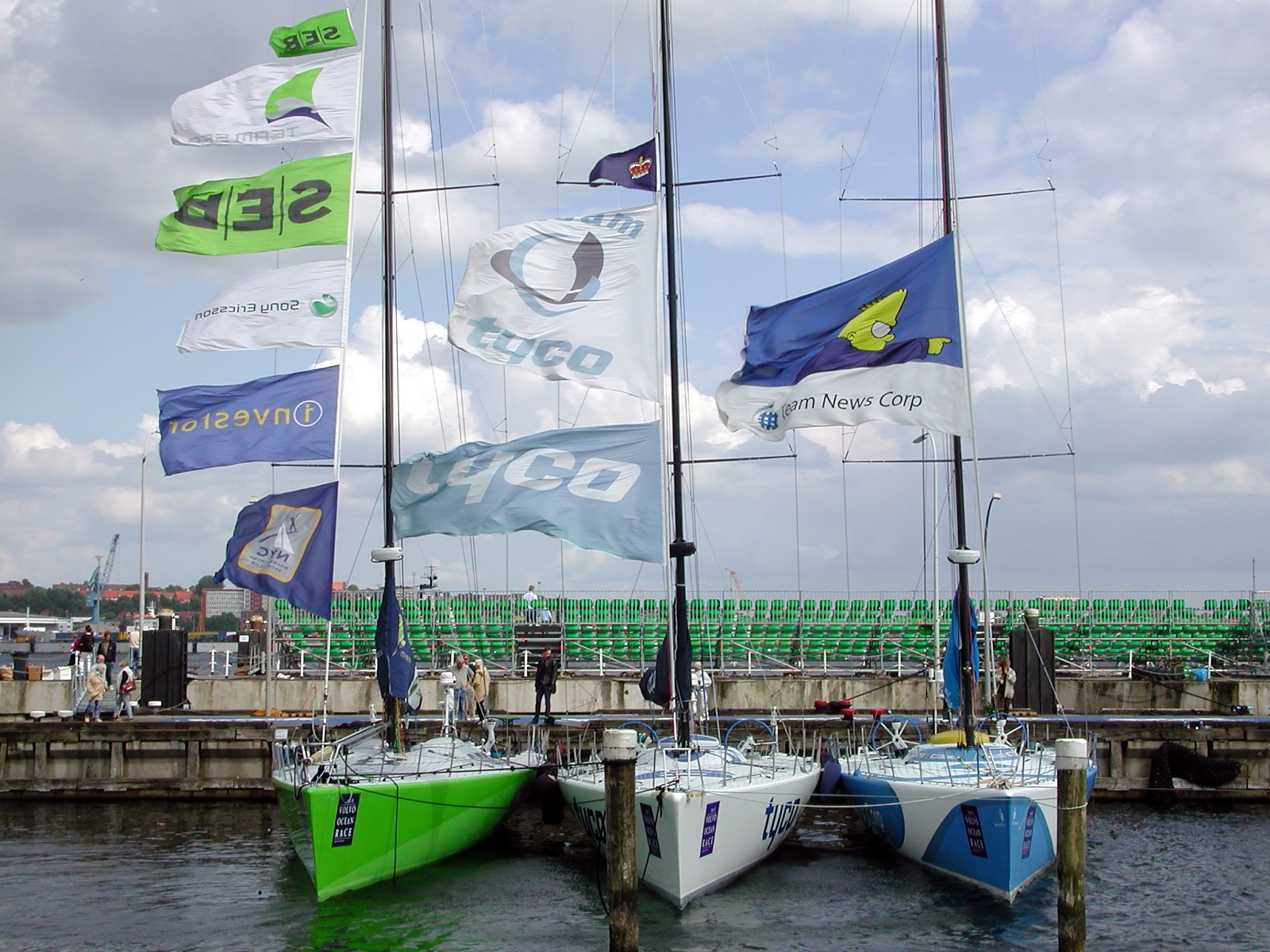
- Team SEB (left), Team Tyco and Team News Corp during 2001–02 Volvo Ocean Race.
- Other names: RS
- Nation: Sweden
- Class: Volvo Ocean 60

Racing career
- Skippers: Gunnar Krantz
- Notable victories: 2003 Volvo Baltic Race

Team SEB (also RS) is a Swedish Volvo Ocean 60 yacht.

== Career ==
She competed in the 2001–02 Volvo Ocean Race and finished 7th skippered by Gunnar Krantz.

The boat was renamed RS and participated in the 2003 Volvo Baltic Race skippered by Erle Williams. RS won the competition.
