= Innovation Kvaerner =

Yacht

- Other names: Atea
- Nation: Norway; Denmark
- Class: Volvo Ocean 60
- Sail no: NOR–2
- Designer(s): Bruce Farr
- Builder: Kvaerner Mandal

Racing career
- Skippers: Knut Frostad

Innovation Kvaerner (also known as Atea) is a yacht. She finished fourth in the 1997–98 Whitbread Round the World Race skippered by Knut Frostad.

== Career ==
Innovation Kvaerner was designed by Bruce Farr and built by Kvaerner Mandal.
