= Intrum Justitia (yacht) =

Volvo yacht

- Class: Volvo Ocean 60

Racing career
- Skippers: Lawrie Smith

Intrum Justitia is a Volvo Ocean 60 yacht. She finished second in the W60 class of the 1993–94 Whitbread Round the World Race skippered by Lawrie Smith.
