= 2005–2006 Volvo Ocean Race =

2005–06 Volvo Ocean Race
Event title
- Edition: 9th
- Dates: 5 November 2005 – 17 June 2006
- Yachts: Volvo Open 70

Competitors
- Competitors: 7

Results
- Winner: ABN AMRO I

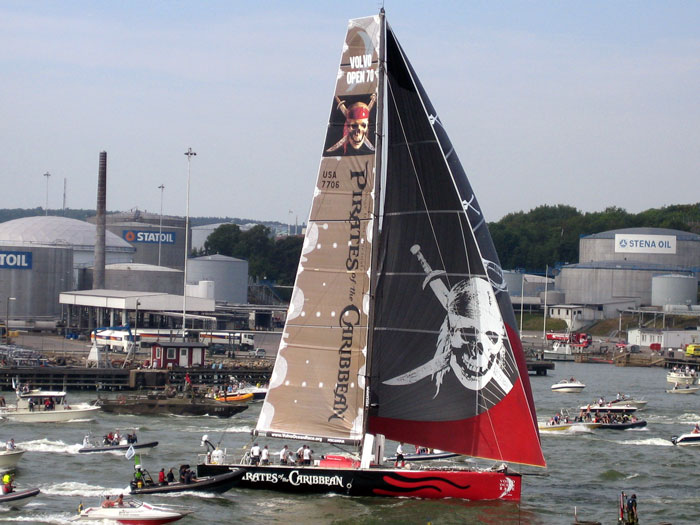
Pirates wins the final leg

The 2005–06 Volvo Ocean Race was held between 5 November 2005 and 17 June 2006. Seven boats took part in the race and made ten stops in nine countries.

The 2005–06 race was the first to not begin in the United Kingdom. The course of 31,000 nautical miles (57,000 km) was divided into 9 legs, and would take over 8 months to complete. A new class of boat, the Volvo Open 70 was introduced: The new boats were 2m longer and about 1,000 kg lighter than the VO60's used in the previous race. They were also allowed to have more sail area and include the use of canting keels.

During Leg 7 of the race, Hans Horrevoets, 32, of the Netherlands was swept overboard from ABN AMRO II. Although he was recovered from the water, attempts to resuscitate him were not successful. CPR was stopped at 0420GMT, 18 May 2006.

The crew of Movistar abandoned ship after the aft end of their keel pivot broke away from their hull in the night of 20 May 2006, and transferred to ABN AMRO II which had been standing by and was escorted by HMS Mersey back to land. Although a search was carried out for the yacht, it is believed she sank due to the damage sustained.

The 2005–06 race had tighter restrictions on the number of crewmembers allowed than previous races. An all-male crew was restricted to ten, while a crew with at least 5 women could have eleven members, and an all-female crew, (of which there were none in the race), could have twelve. The only woman who served as crew was Adrienne Cahalan of Brasil 1, who was replaced after the first leg. The skipper of each team could nominate one additional person for the in-port races.

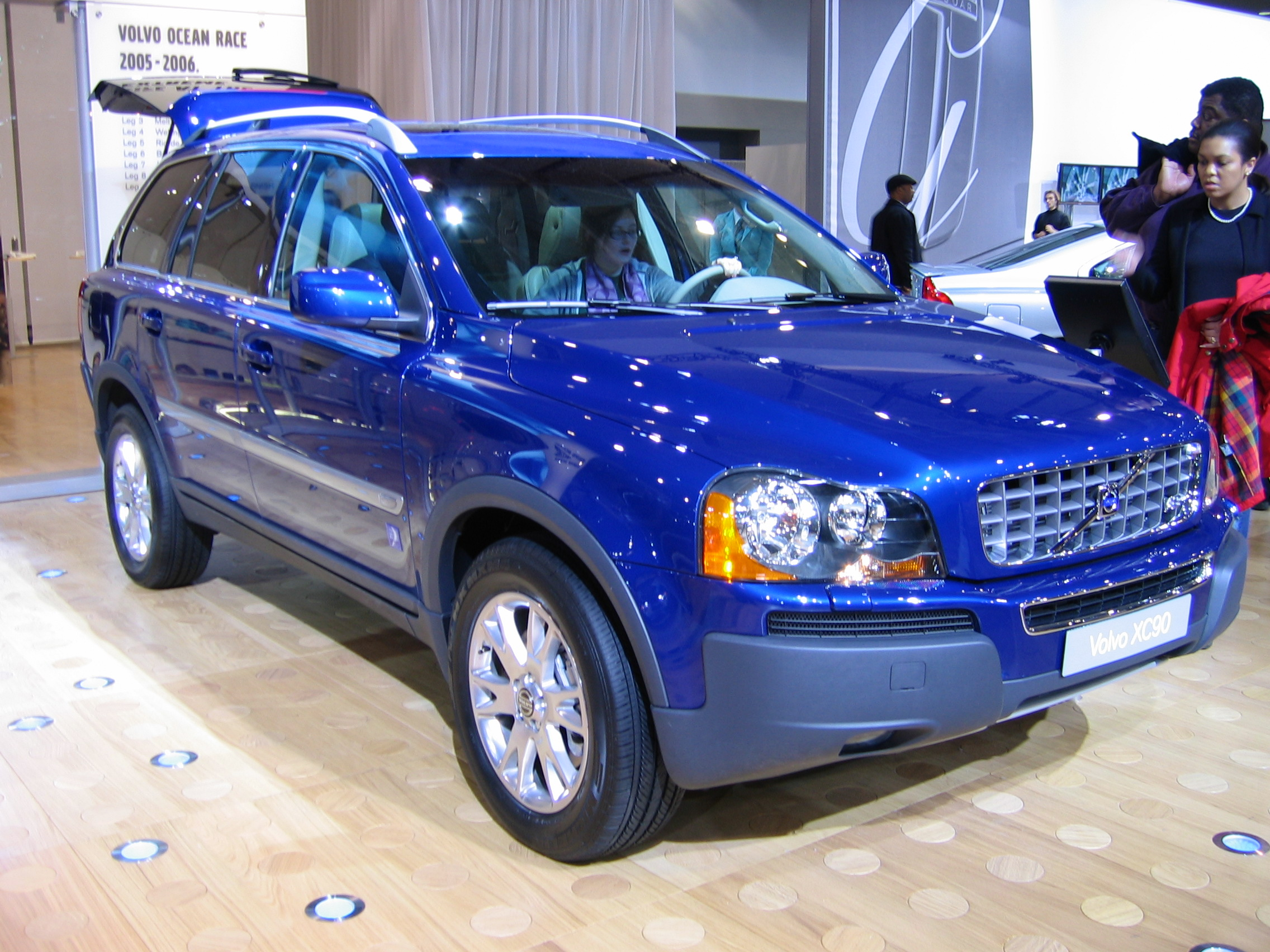
Volvo XC90 Ocean Race with the 2005 VOR route displayed in the background

In early 2005 Volvo released a limited model called the V70 Ocean Race Edition and the XC90 Ocean Race Edition.

== Participants ==
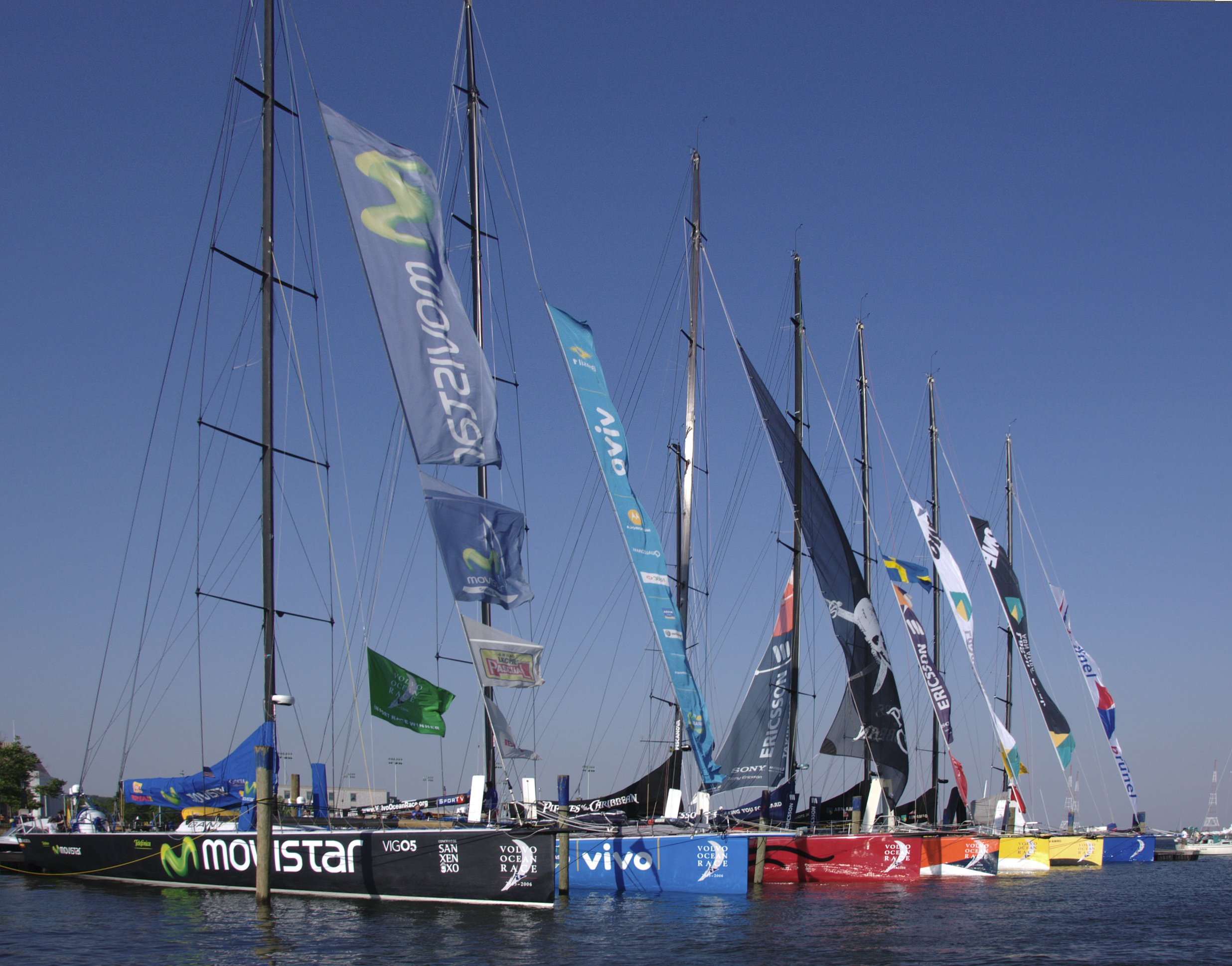
The competitors at port in Annapolis.

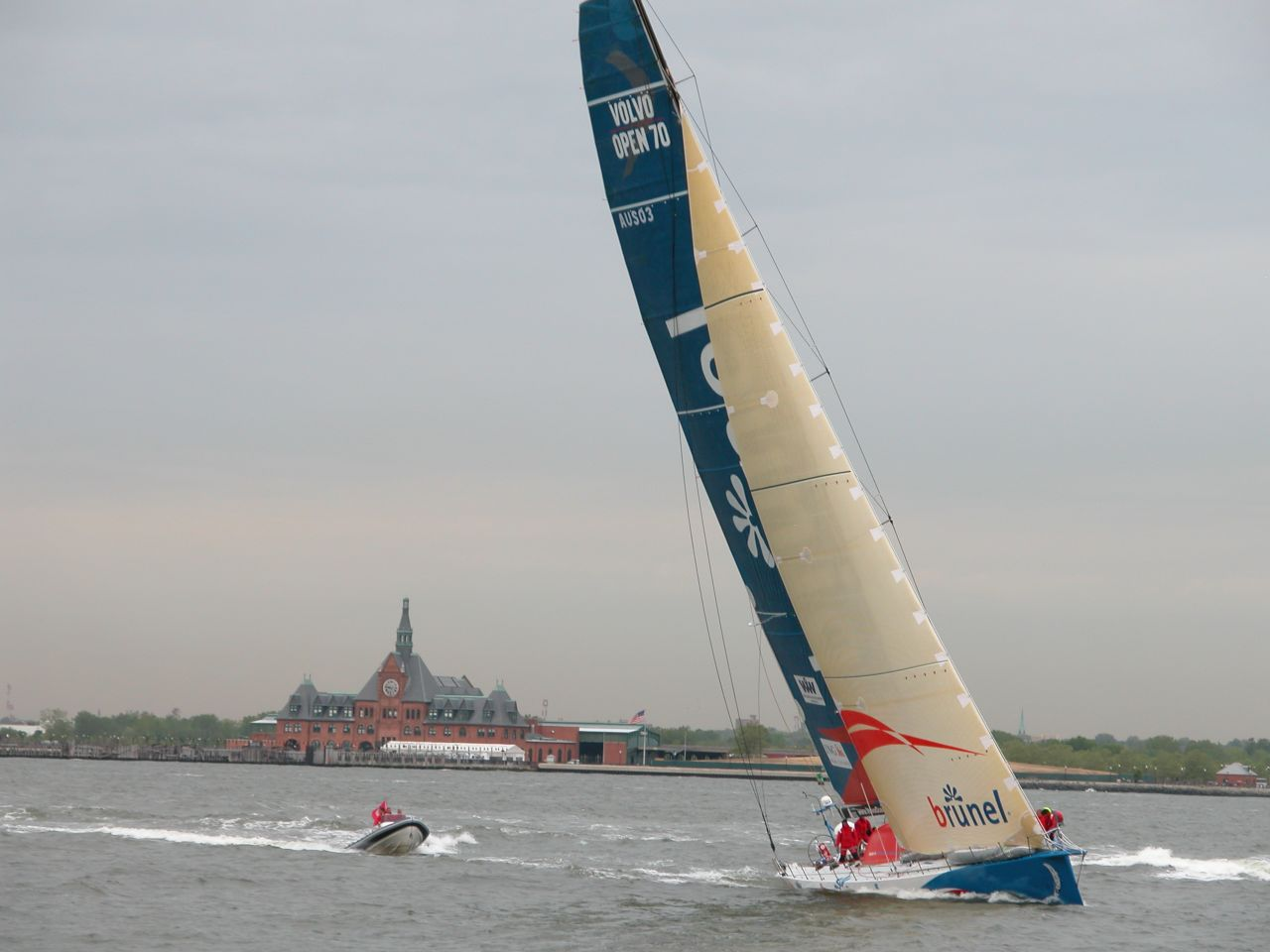
Brunel finishing the New York leg

Yacht	Flag & Sail	Designer	Builder	Skipper
ABN AMRO I	(Netherlands) NED 1	Juan Kouyoumdjian	Killian Bushe	Mike Sanderson
ABN AMRO II	(Netherlands) NED 2	Juan Kouyoumdjian	Killian Bushe	Sébastien Josse
Brasil1	(Brazil) BRA 1	Farr Yacht Design	ML Boatworks	Torben Grael
Brunel (Sunergy and Friends)	(Australia) AUS 03	Don Jones	Hart Marine	Grant Warington
Ericsson Racing Team	(Sweden) SWE 1876	Farr Yacht Design	Green Marine	Neal MacDonald; John Kostecki
movistar	(Spain) ESP 1	Farr Yacht Design	Boatspeed	Bouwe Bekking
Pirates of the Caribbean	(United States) USA 7706	Farr Yacht Design	Green Marine	Paul Cayard

== Route ==
Event	Starting date	Start	Finish	Distance (nmi)	Winner
Race 1	5 November 2005	(Spain) Sanxenxo		In-Port Race	Ericsson Racing Team
Leg 1	12 November 2005	(Spain) Vigo	(South Africa) Cape Town	6,400	ABN AMRO I
Race 2	26 December 2005	(South Africa) Cape Town		In-Port Race	ABN AMRO I
Leg 2	2 January 2006	(South Africa) Cape Town	(Australia) Melbourne	6,100	ABN AMRO I
Race 3	4 February 2006	(Australia) Melbourne		In-Port Race	ABN AMRO I
Leg 3	12 February 2006	(Australia) Melbourne	(New Zealand) Wellington	1,450	movistar
Leg 4	19 February 2006	(New Zealand) Wellington	(Brazil) Rio de Janeiro	6,700	ABN AMRO I
Race 4	25 March 2006	(Brazil) Rio de Janeiro		In-Port Race	ABN AMRO I
Leg 5	2 April 2006	(Brazil) Rio de Janeiro	(United States) Baltimore	5,000	ABN AMRO I
Race 5	29 April 2006	(United States) Baltimore		In-Port Race	movistar
Leg 6	2 May 2006	(United States) Annapolis	(United States) New York City	400	ABN AMRO I
Leg 7	11 May 2006	(United States) New York City	(United Kingdom) Portsmouth	3,200	ABN AMRO I
Race 6	29 May 2006	(United Kingdom) Portsmouth		In-Port Race	ABN AMRO I
Leg 8	2 June 2006	(United Kingdom) Portsmouth	(Netherlands) Rotterdam	1,500	Brasil1
Race 7	11 June 2006	(Netherlands) Rotterdam		In-Port Race	ABN AMRO I
Leg 9	15 June 2006	(Netherlands) Rotterdam	(Sweden) Gothenburg	500	Pirates of the Caribbean

== Leg Results ==
#	Boat	Leg 1 (Spain) (South Africa)	Leg 2 (South Africa) (Australia)	Leg 3 (Australia) (New Zealand)	Leg 4 (New Zealand) (Brazil)	Leg 5 (Brazil) (United States)	Leg 6 (United States) (United States)	Leg 7 (United States) (United Kingdom)	Leg 8 (United Kingdom) (Netherlands)	Leg 9 (Netherlands) (Sweden)	Total
1	ABN AMRO I	10.5	14	6	10.5	10	7	10.5	6	2	76.5
2	Pirates of the Caribbean	1 DNF	8.5	5	9	7.5	6	9	4	7	57
3	Brasil1	7.5	2 DNF	4	6.5	5.5	5	7.5	7	5	50
4	ABN AMRO II	8	12	3	7	3	1	4.5	3	6	47.5
5	Ericsson Racing Team	7	1 DNF	2	4.5	5	4	9	5	3	40.5
6	Movistar	1 DNF	9.5	7	3	9.5	3	1 DNF	0 DNS	0 DNS	34
7	Brunel-Sunergy and Friends	4.5	6	0 DNS	0 DNS	0 DNS	2	4.5	2	4	23

== In-Port Race Results ==
#	Boat	IP1 (Spain)	IP2 (South Africa)	IP3 (Australia)	IP4 (Brazil)	IP5 (United States)	IP6 (United Kingdom)	IP7 (Netherlands)	Total
1	ABN AMRO I	1	3.5	3.5	3.5	1	3.5	3.5	19.5
2	Brasil1	3	2	1.5	2	3	2.5	3	17
3	Pirates of the Caribbean	2.5	1.5	3	1	2.5	3	2.5	16
4	Ericsson Racing Team	3.5	1	2	2.5	2	1.5	2	14.5
5	Movistar	2	3	2.5	3	3.5	0 DNS	0 DNS	14
6	ABN AMRO II	1.5	2.5	1	1.5	1.5	2	1	11
7	Brunel-Sunergy and Friends	0 DNS	0.5	0.5	0 DNS	0.5	1	1.5	4

== Overall Results ==
Pos	Sail Number	Yacht	Country	Yacht Type	LOA (Metres)	Skipper	Points
1	NED 1	ABN AMRO One	Netherlands	Juan-K Volvo Open 70	21.49	Mike Sanderson	96
2	USA 7706	Pirates of the Caribbean	United States	Farr Volvo Open 70	21.49	Paul Cayard	73
3	BRA 1	Brasil 1	Brazil	Farr Volvo Open 70	21.49	Torben Grael	67
4	NED 2	ABN AMRO Two	Netherlands	Juan-K Volvo Open 70	21.49	Sébastien Josse	58.5
5	SWE 1876	Ericsson Racing Team	Sweden	Farr Volvo Open 70	21.49	Neal McDonald; John Kostecki	55
6	ESP 1	Movistar	Spain	Farr Volvo Open 70	21.49	Bouwe Bekking	48
7	AUS 03	Brunel-Sunergy and Friends	Australia	Jones Volvo Open 70	21.49	Grant Wharington	27
