= Swedish Match (yacht) =

Volvo Ocean 60 yacht

- Other names: Nokia; Avant
- Nation: Sweden; Denmark
- Class: Volvo Ocean 60
- Sail no: SWE–2000
- Designer(s): Bruce Farr
- Builder: Cookson Boats

Racing career
- Skippers: Gunnar Krantz; Stefan Myralf; Michael Spies
- Notable victories: 1999 Sydney–Hobart (l.h.)

Specifications
- Displacement: 13,500 kg (29,800 lb)
- Length: 19.5 m (64 ft) (LOA)
- Beam: 5.25 m (17.2 ft)
- Draft: 3.75 m (12.3 ft)

Swedish Match (also known as Nokia, Avant) is a Volvo Ocean 60 yacht that won, as Nokia, the Sydney to Hobart ocean yacht race in world record time in 1999. She also competed in the 1997–98 Whitbread Round the World Race and the 2003 Volvo Baltic Race.

== Career ==
Swedish Match was designed by Bruce Farr and built by Cookson Boats.

Swedish Match competed in the 1997–98 Whitbread Round the World Race and finished 3rd. She was skippered by Gunnar Krantz.

She was given a new name, Nokia, and competed in the 1999 Sydney to Hobart Yacht Race. She won line honours in the 1999 Sydney to Hobart Yacht Race skippered by Stefan Myralf and Michael Spies. The winning time, 1 day, 19 hours, 48 minutes, and 2 seconds stood as a record until Wild Oats XI beat it in the 2005 edition.

In 2003, she competed in the Volvo Baltic Race under the name Avant.
