= Illbruck Challenge =

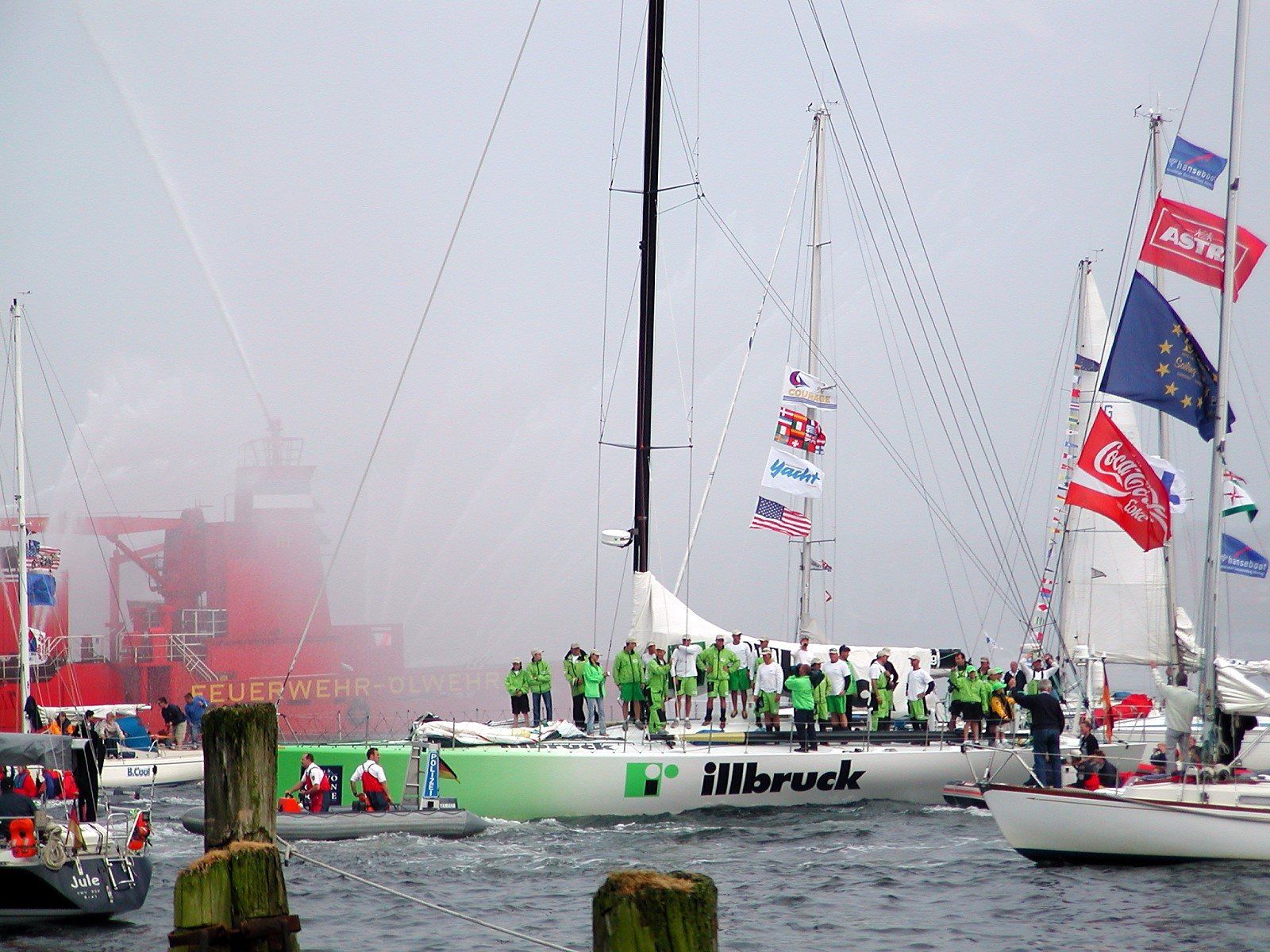
- Illbruck Challenge in Kiel during 2001–02 Volvo Ocean Race
- Nation: Germany
- Class: Volvo Ocean 60
- Designer(s): Bruce Farr
- Builder: Killian Bushe
- Launched: 2001

Racing career
- Skippers: John Kostecki
- Notable victories: 2001–02 Volvo Ocean Race

Specifications
- Displacement: 13,500 kg (29,800 lb)
- Length: 19.40 m (63.6 ft) (LOA); 17.30 m (56.8 ft) (LWL)
- Beam: 5.25 m (17.2 ft)
- Draft: 3.75 m (12.3 ft)

Illbruck Challenge is a Volvo Ocean 60 yacht. She won the 2001–02 Volvo Ocean Race skippered by John Kostecki.

Illbruck Challenge was launched in 2001.
