= Amer Sports One =

2002-2003 Volvo Ocean Race Yacht by Frers

Nautor Challenge - Amer Sports One is a Volvo Ocean 60 yacht the build started after securing back backing from Nautor Swan and named Nautor Challenge but later secured funding from Amer Sports and UBS Bank. She finished third in the 2001–02 Volvo Ocean Race skippered by Grant Dalton who had insisted on a Farr designed boat Amer Sports Too.

== Later life ==
The yacht was purchased by Canadian Derek Hatfield, and renamed Spirit of Adventure. In 2010, Hatfield set a new record for the Halifax to Saint Pierre Ocean Race, in 29h, 43min, and 56sec.

In 2016, the yacht is acquired by Gilles Barbot, and renamed Esprit de Corps IV. She was to be skippered by Derek Hatfield who joined Atlas Ocean Racing but Hatfield died in July 2016.

At 4am AST on 22 May 2019 while bound for Lunenburg from the Caribbean, the Esprit de Corps IV was shipwrecked on Cross Island, NS.
