= Chessie Racing =

Yacht designed by Bruce Farr and built by Eric Goetz Custom Boats

- Other names: AV-Teknik
- Nation: United States; Croatia
- Class: Volvo Ocean 60
- Sail no: USA–60
- Designer(s): Bruce Farr
- Builder: Eric Goetz Custom Boats

Racing career
- Skippers: George Collins

Chessie Racing (also AV-Teknik) is a yacht. She finished sixth in the 1997–98 Whitbread Round the World Race skippered by George Collins.

== Career ==
Chessie Racing was designed by Bruce Farr and built by Eric Goetz Custom Boats.
