= Team News Corp =

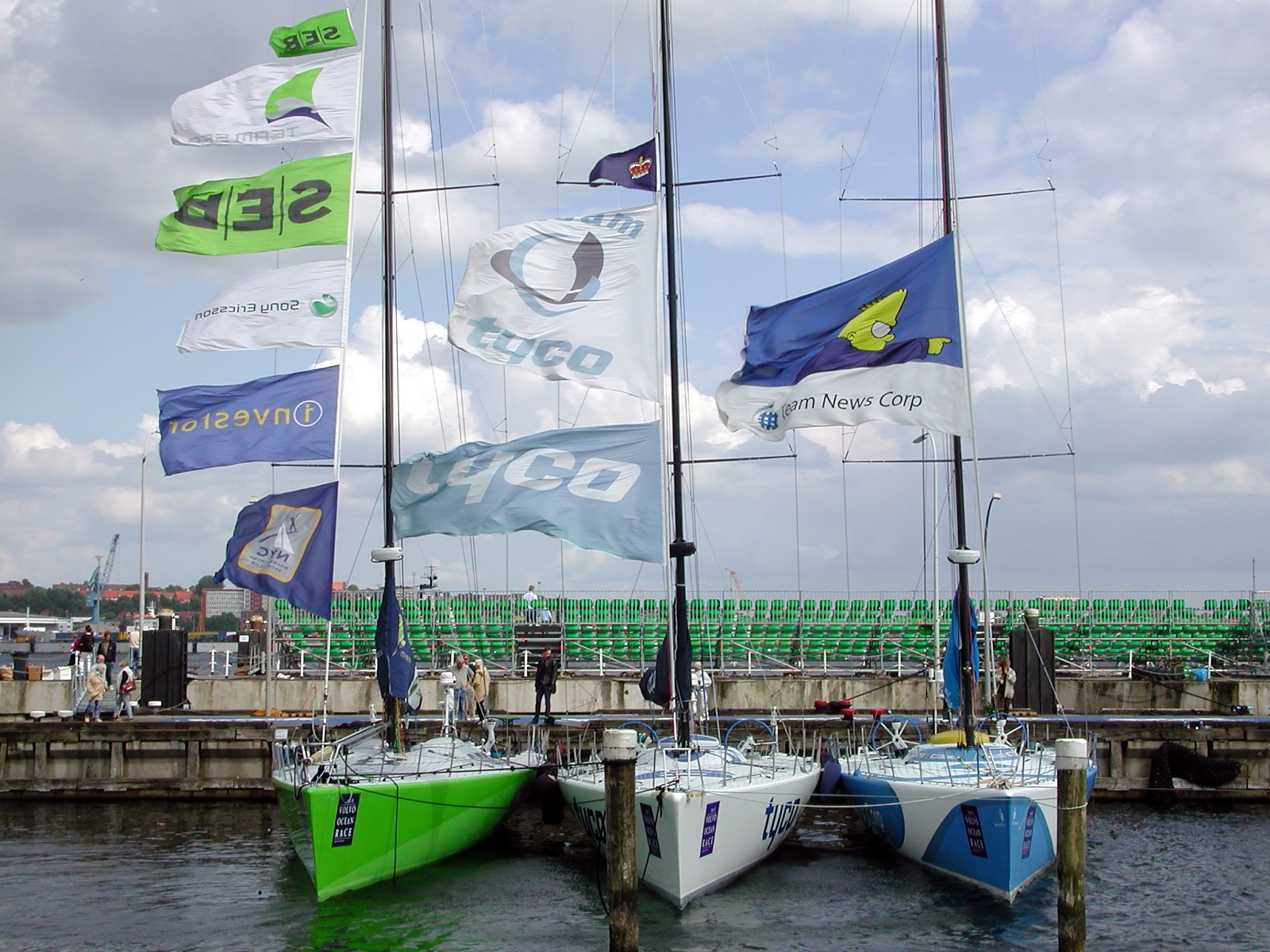
- Team SEB, Team Tyco and Team News Corp (right) during 2001–02 Volvo Ocean Race.
- Other names: Challenge of Netsurvey; Team Elanders
- Nation: Australia; Sweden
- Class: Volvo Ocean 60

Racing career
- Skippers: Jez Fanstone

Team News Corp (also Challenge of Netsurvey, Team Elanders) is an Australian Volvo Ocean 60 yacht. She competed in the 2001–02 Volvo Ocean Race and finished 5th skippered by Jez Fanstone.
