= Silk Cut (yacht) =

Volvo Ocean 60 yacht

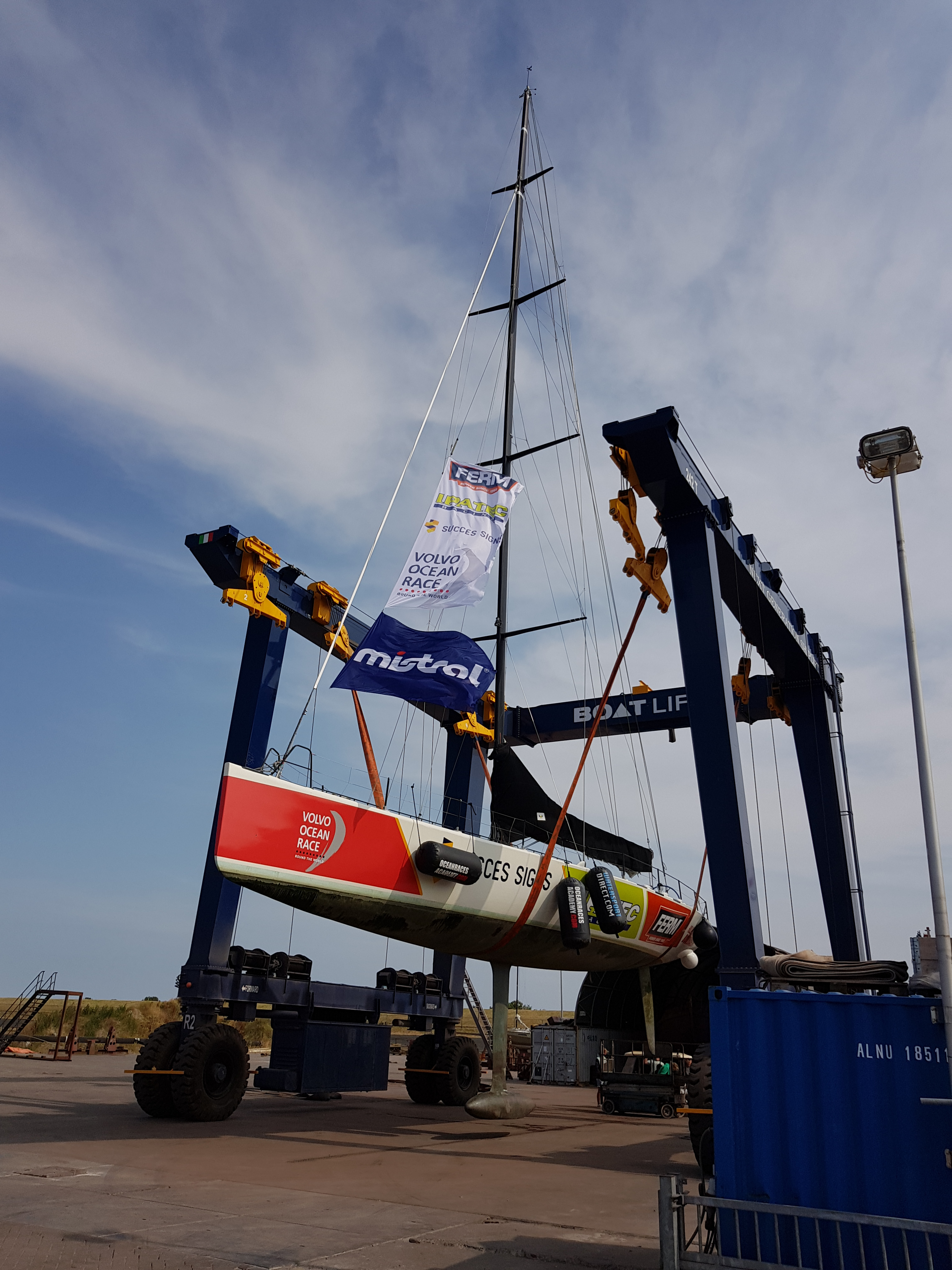
- Boudragon hauled out of the water in Lauwersoog
- Other names: Elanders/Ten Celsius; JMS Next Generation; Boudragon
- Nation: United Kingdom; Sweden; Norway; Netherlands
- Class: Volvo Ocean 60
- Sail no: GBR–1; SWE-20002
- Designer(s): Bruce Farr
- Builder: McConaghy Boats
- Owner(s): Oceanraces Academy

Racing career
- Skippers: Lawrie Smith; Hans Bouscholte

Silk Cut (also Elanders/Ten Celsius, JMS Next Generation) is a Volvo Ocean 60 yacht. She finished fifth in the 1997–98 Whitbread Round the World Race skippered by Lawrie Smith.

== Career ==
Silk Cut was designed by Bruce Farr and built by McConaghy Boats.

She finished fifth in the 1997–98 Whitbread Round the World Race skippered by Lawrie Smith.

Elanders/Ten Celsius competed in the 2003 Volvo Baltic Race helmed by Hans Wallén.

JMS Next Generation competed in the 2004 Volvo Baltic Race.

Boudragon is currently owned by the Oceanraces Academy.
