= Amer Sports Too =

Amer Sports Too is a Volvo Ocean 60 yacht. It was notable as the only all-female crew in the race, and was given special permission to sail with an extra crew member. She finished eighth in the 2001–02 Volvo Ocean Race skippered by Lisa McDonald.

- Lisa McDonald (USA) also United Kingdom Skipper
- Genevieve White (AUS) Navigator
- Anna Drougge (SWE) Trimmer and Sailmaker
- Emma Westmacott (GBR) also Australia Watch Captain
- Katie Pettibone (USA) Watch Captain
- Bridget Suckling (NZL) Bow
- Keryn Henderson (NZL) Foredeck, Helm and Medic
- Sharon Ferris (NZL) Trimmer and Helm
- Abigail Seager (GBR) Bow and Boat Captain
- Eleanor Hay (GBR) Pit and Trimmer
- Willenien Van Hoeve (NED) also Ireland Trimmer
- Klaartje Zuiderbaam (NED) Trimmer and Helm
- Melissa Purdy (USA) Trimmer and Helm
