= 2001–2002 Volvo Ocean Race =

2001–02 Volvo Ocean Race
Event title
- Edition: 8th
- Dates: 23 Sept 2001 – 9 June 2002
- Yachts: Volvo Ocean 60

Competitors
- Competitors: 8

Results
- Winner: Illbruck Challenge

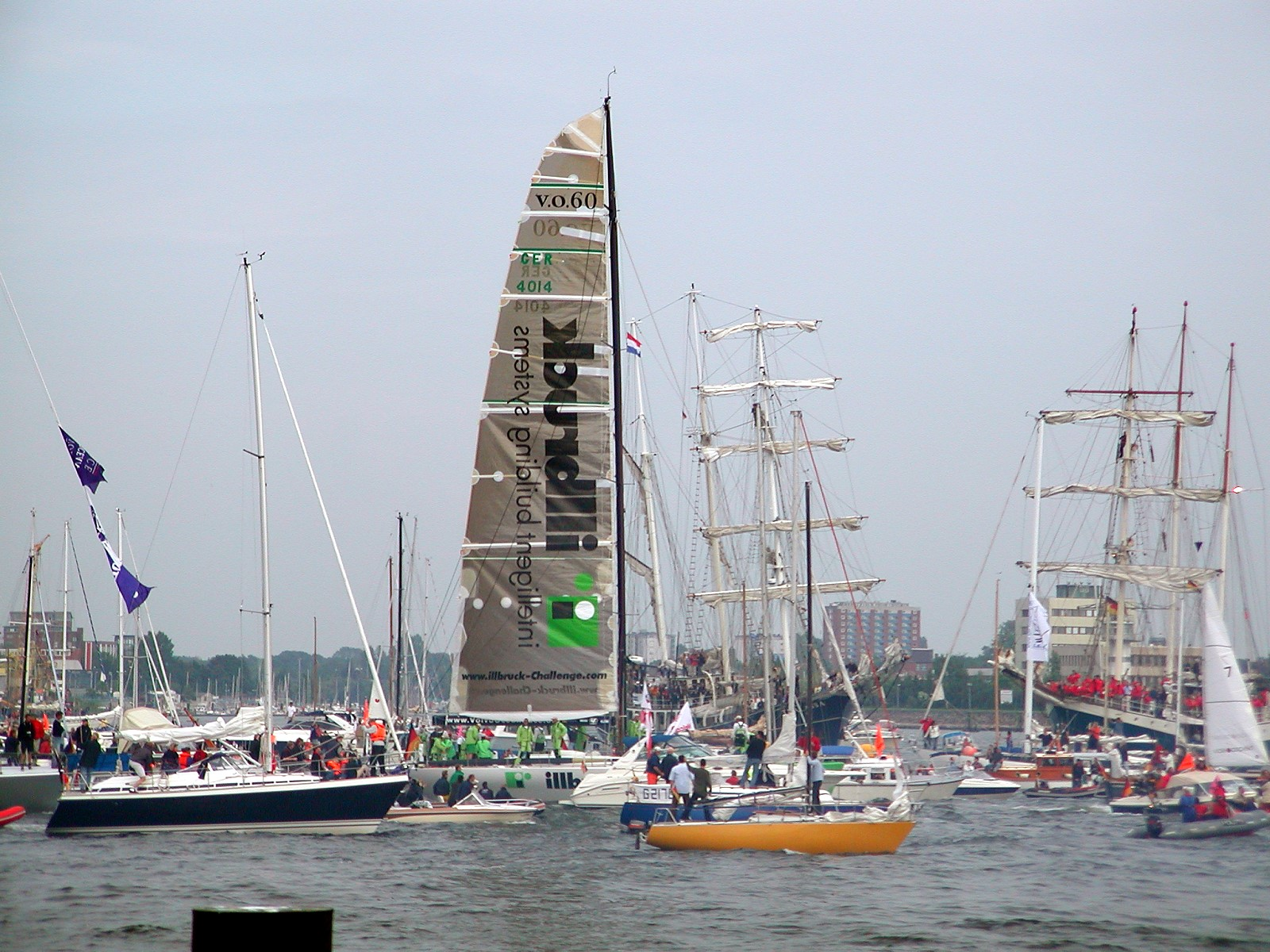
Illbruck Challenge in Kiel

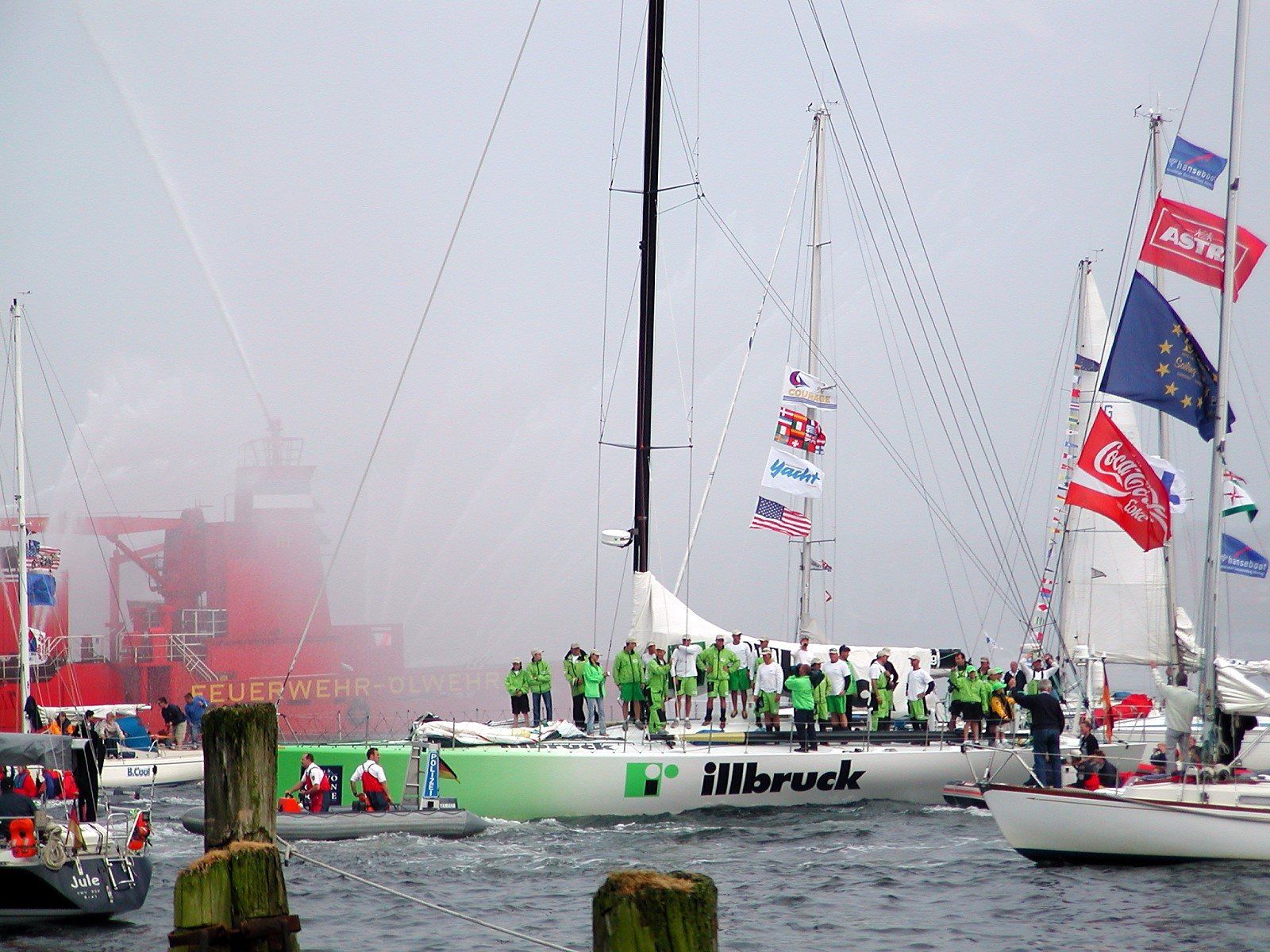
Illbruck Challenge in Kiel

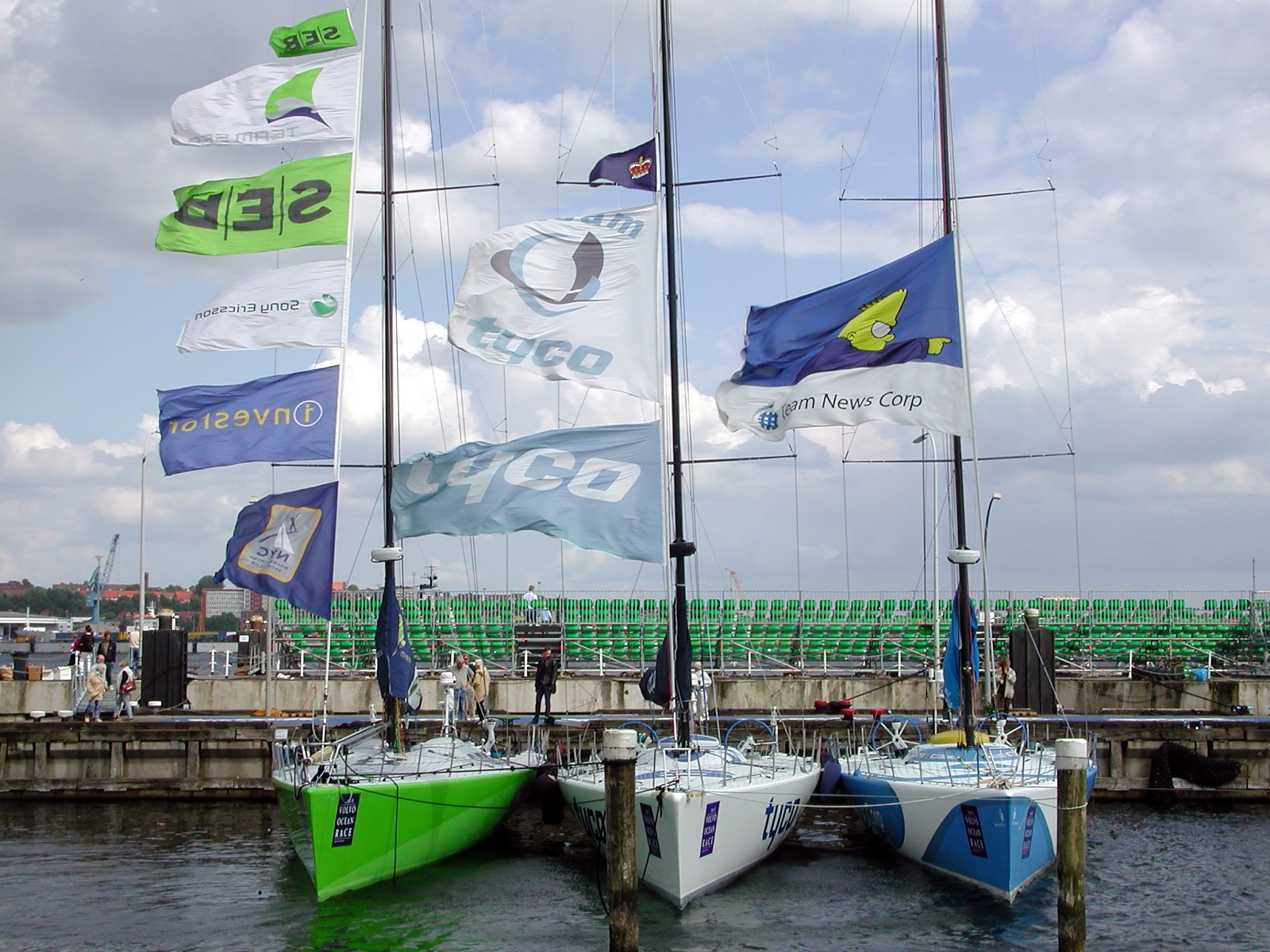
Team SEB, Team Tyco and News Corp in Kiel

The 2001–02 Volvo Ocean Race was the eighth edition of the around-the-world sailing event Volvo Ocean Race, and the first under the name Volvo Ocean Race. For the 2001–02 the sponsorship of the race was taken over by Volvo and Volvo Cars. The race was renamed the Volvo Ocean Race. Stopovers were added in Germany, France, and Sweden being the Volvo's three biggest car markets in Europe. In addition the points system had been modified significantly in an effort to keep the race competitive until the final leg. The previous "points" race having been effectively won two full legs before the final gun.

John Kostecki, who had co-skippered with George Collins on Chessie Racing in the 1997 to 1998 Whitbread to great effect, captained his first Volvo Ocean race winner in 2002. Assa Abloy's new composite mold technique proved very quick, but not quite quick enough, while long time Whitbread skipper Grant Dalton's two boat syndicate suffered badly from a lack of preparation time (the Amer boats were last in the water).

For Leg 3, yachts joined the iconic Australian 2001 Sydney to Hobart Yacht Race that begins on Boxing Day (the day after Christmas Day).

== Participants ==
Boat	Nation	Designer	Skipper
Amer Sports One	New Zealand	Mani Frers	(New Zealand) Grant Dalton
Amer Sports Too	United Kingdom	Farr Yacht Design	(United Kingdom) Lisa McDonald
Assa Abloy	Sweden	Farr Yacht Design	(Netherlands) Roy Heiner (United Kingdom) Neal McDonald
Djuice Dragons	Norway	Laurie Davidson	(Norway) Knut Frostad
Illbruck Challenge	Germany	Farr Yacht Design	(United States) John Kostecki
Team News Corp	Australia	Farr Yacht Design	(United Kingdom) Jez Fanstone
Team SEB	Sweden	Farr Yacht Design	(Sweden) Gurra Krantz
Team Tyco	Bermuda	Farr Yacht Design	(New Zealand) Kevin Shoebridge

Lisa and Neal McDonald, skippers of rival boats, are husband and wife.

== Route ==
Event	Start date	Finish date	Start	Finish	Distance (nmi)	Winner
Leg 1	23 September 2001	23 October 2001	(United Kingdom) Southampton	(South Africa) Cape Town	7,350	Illbruck Challenge
Leg 2	11 November 2001	4 December 2001	(South Africa) Cape Town	(Australia) Sydney	6,550	Illbruck Challenge
Leg 3	26 December 2001	3 January 2002	(Australia) Sydney	(New Zealand) Auckland	2,050	Assa Abloy
Leg 4	27 January 2002	19 February 2002	(New Zealand) Auckland	(Brazil) Rio de Janeiro	6,700	Illbruck Challenge
Leg 5	22 March 2002	27 March 2002	(Brazil) Rio de Janeiro	(United States) Miami	4,450	Assa Abloy
Leg 6	14 April 2002	17 April 2002	(United States) Miami	(United States) Baltimore	875	Team News Corp
Leg 7	28 April 2002	11 May 2002	(United States) Annapolis	(France) La Rochelle	3,400	Illbruck Challenge
Leg 8	25 May 2002	31 May 2002	(France) La Rochelle	(Sweden) Gothenburg	1,075	Assa Abloy
Leg 9	8 June 2002	9 June 2002	(Sweden) Gothenburg	(Germany) Kiel	250	Djuice Dragons

== Leg Results ==
#	Boat	Leg 1 (United Kingdom) (South Africa)	Leg 2 (South Africa) (Australia)	Leg 3 (Australia) (New Zealand)	Leg 4 (New Zealand) (Brazil)	Leg 5 (Brazil) (United States)	Leg 6 (United States) (United States)	Leg 7 (United States) (France)	Leg 8 (France) (Sweden)	Leg 9 (Sweden) (Germany)	Total
1	Illbruck Challenge	8	8	5	8	7	5	8	5	7	61
2	Assa Abloy	4	3	8	5	8	6	7	8	6	55
3	Amer Sports One	7	4	7	4	3	7	4	4	4	44
4	Team Tyco	5	1 DNF	6	6	6	3	6	7	2	42
5	Team News Corp	6	6	4	3	4	8	3	6	1	41
6	Djuice Dragons	2	5	3	7	2	2	2	2	8	33
7	Team SEB	3	7	1 DNF	1 DNF	5	4	5	3	3	32
8	Amer Sports Too	1	2	2	2	1	1	1 DNF	1	5	16

== Overall Results ==
Pos	Sail Number	Yacht	Country	Yacht Type	LOA (Metres)	Skipper	Points
1	GER 4014	Illbruck Challenge	Germany	Farr Volvo Ocean 60	19.40	John Kostecki	61
2	SWE 1645	Assa Abloy	Sweden	Farr Volvo Ocean 60	19.40	Roy Heiner; Neal McDonald	55
3	EUR 1	Amer Sports One	Italy	Frers Volvo Ocean 60	19.40	Grant Dalton	44
4	BER 2001	Team Tyco	Bermuda	Farr Volvo Ocean 60	19.40	Kevin Shoebridge	42
5	AUS 9011	Team News Corp	Australia	Farr Volvo Ocean 60	19.40	Jez Fanstone	41
6	NOR 2	Djuice Dragons	Norway	Davidson Volvo Ocean 60	19.40	Knut Frostad	33
7	SWE 20001	Team SEB	Sweden	Farr Volvo Ocean 60	19.40	Gunnar Krantz	32
8	EUR 2	Amer Sports Too	Italy	Farr Volvo Ocean 60	19.40	Lisa McDonald	16
