= Volvo Ocean 60 =

Class of ocean racing yacht

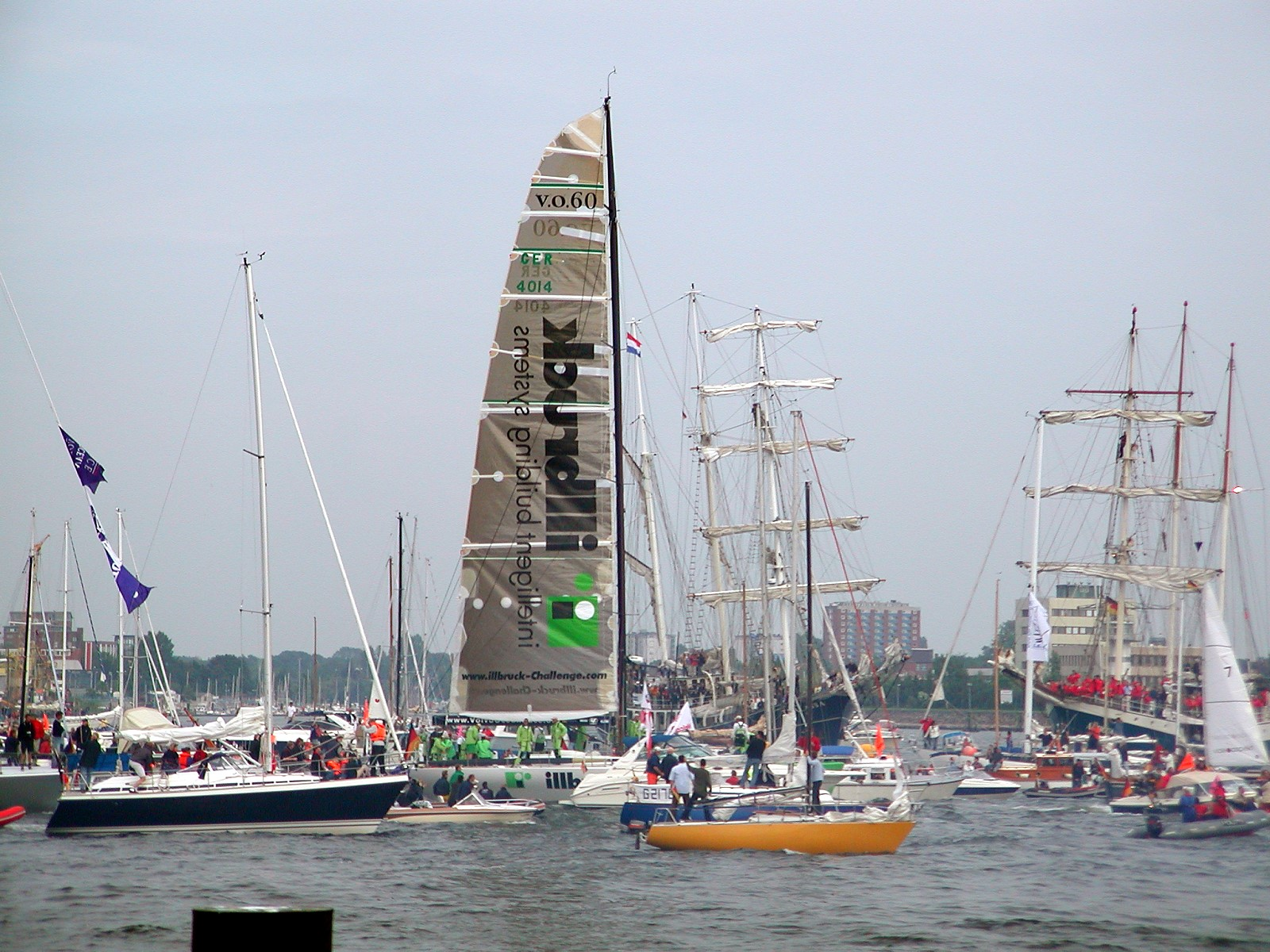
Illbruck Challenge in Kiel during 2001–2002 Volvo Ocean Race

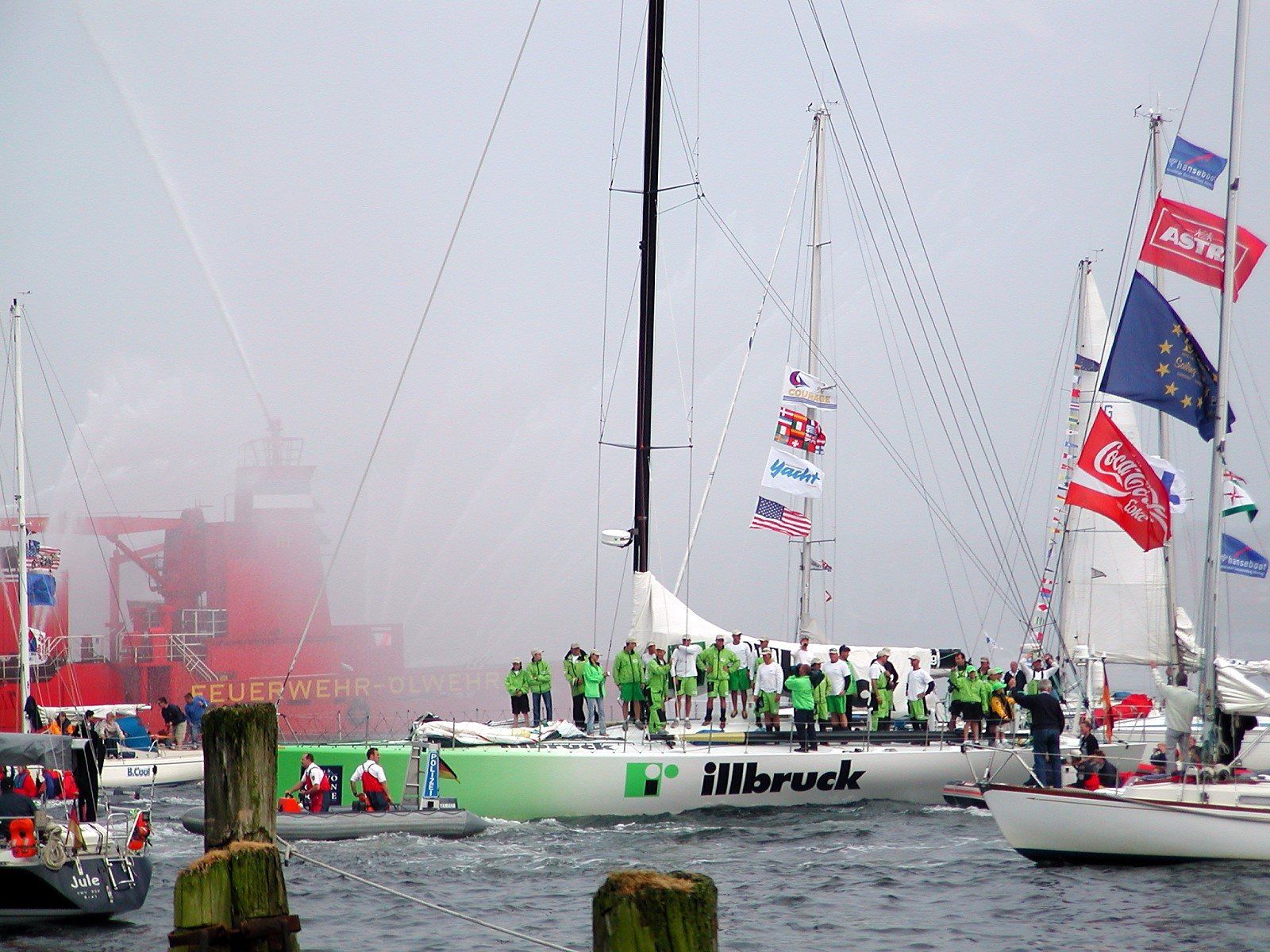
Illbruck Challenge in Kiel during 2001–2002 Volvo Ocean Race

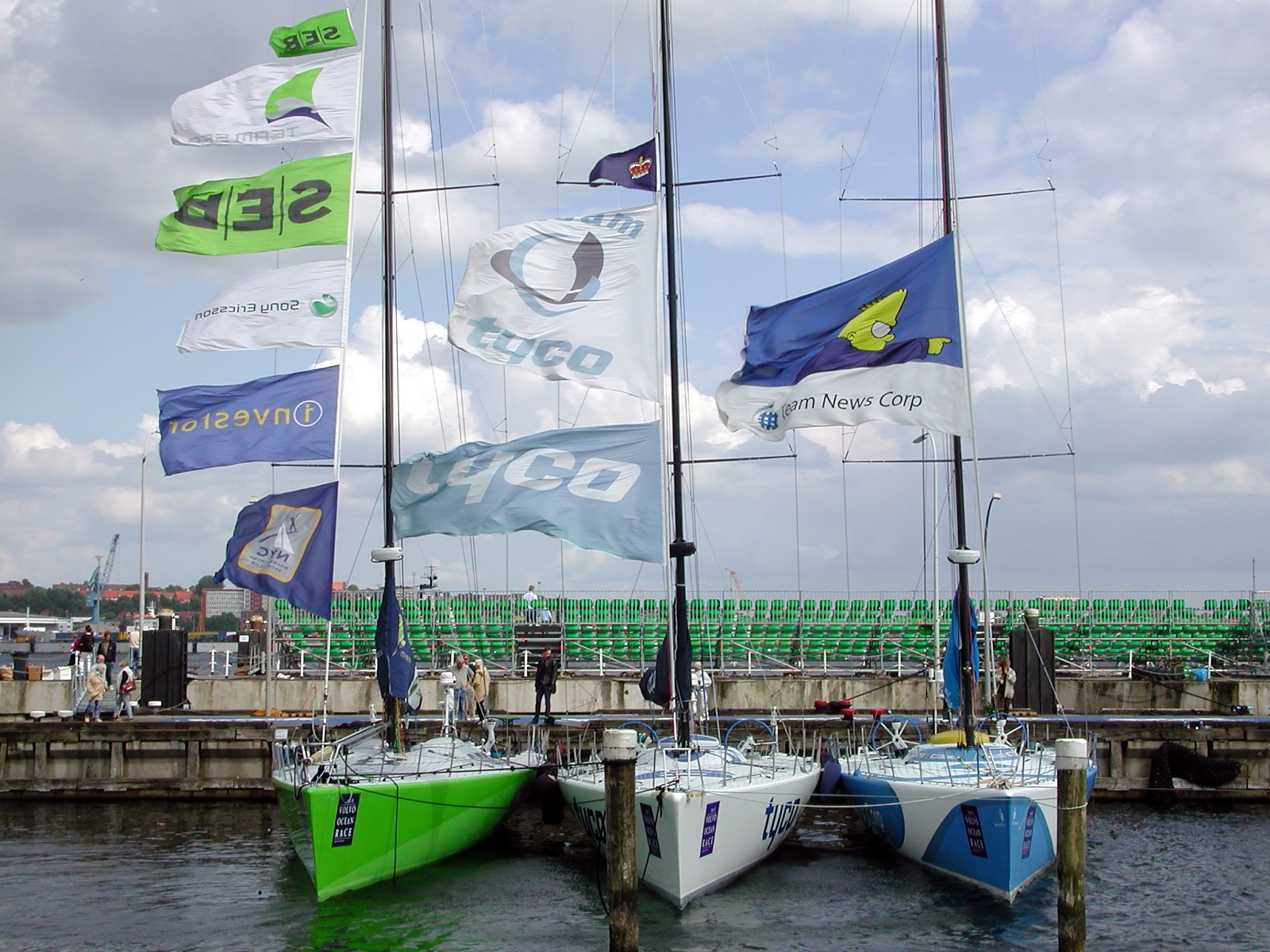
Team SEB, Team Tyco and News Corp in Kiel during 2001–2002 Volvo Ocean Race

The Whitbread 60 (W60), later known as the Volvo Ocean 60 (VO60), was a class of ocean racing yacht built to a "box rule" specifying key design parameters of the 10 smaller yachts which took part the 1993–94 Whitbread Round the World Race.

The class raced with such success that the following race was restricted to Whitbread 60s only. Its design was used for the last time in the 2001–02 Volvo Ocean Race, replaced thereafter by the sophisticated, canting keel Volvo Open 70, built to a new box rule.

== Box Rule specifications ==
	Ocean 60
Overall Length:	19.50 m (64 ft)
Beam:	5.25 m (17 ft)
Draught:	3.75 m (12 ft)
Air Draught:	26.00 m (85 ft)
Displacement:	13,500 kg (29,762 lb)

== Yachts ==
A total of 32 Volvo Ocean 60s were built for the three editions the class was used by the race. 28 of these competed in the race with 4 boats being built as training boats for two boat testing although race organizers tried to discourage this.

Whitbread 60s/Volvo Ocean 60s
1993–1994	1997–1998	2001–2002
Brooksfield	America's Challenge	Amer Sports One
Heineken	Brunel Sunergy	Amer Sports Too
Hetman Sahaidachny	Chessie Racing	Assa Abloy (2)
Galicia '93 Pescanova	EF Education	Djuice Dragons
Intrum Justitia	EF Language	Illbruck Challenge
Reebok/Dolphin & Youth	Innovation Kvaerner	Team News Corp
Tokio	Merit Cup (1)	Team SEB
Odessa	Silk Cut	Team Tyco
Winston	Swedish Match	
Yamaha	Toshiba	
Tune Up Boats
Tokio II	Merit Cup (2)	Assa Abloy (1)
		Djuice Dragons (1)

=== Designers ===
Whitbread 60s/Volvo Ocean 60s Designers
Designer	1993–1994	1997–1998	2001–2002	Total
Bruce Farr	7	8(1)	6	22
John Swarbrick	(1)			1
Bouvet-Petit	1			1
Sidenko	1			1
Humphreys	1			1
Alan Andrews		1		1
Judel Vroljik		1		1
Laurie Davidson			1(1)	2
German Frers			1	1
Total	10(1)	10(1)	8(2)	32

== Comparison of Ocean 60 and Open 70 ==
	Ocean 60	Open 70
Overall Length:	19.50 m (64 ft)	21.50 m (71 ft)
Beam:	5.25 m (17 ft)	5.70 m (19 ft)
Draught:	3.75 m (12 ft)	4.50 m (15 ft)
Air Draught:	26.00 m (85 ft)	31.50 m (103 ft)
Displacement:	13,500 kg (29,762 lb)	14,000 kg (30,865 lb)
Ballast	Water Ballast	
Keel	Fixed	Canting
