= 2014 Sydney to Hobart Yacht Race =

2014 annual yacht race in Australia

70th Sydney to Hobart Yacht Race
Event information
- Type: Yacht
- Dates: 26–31 December 2014
- Sponsor: Rolex
- Host city: Sydney, Hobart
- Boats: 117
- Distance: 628 nautical miles (1,163 km)
- Website: Website archive

Results
- Winner (2014): Wild Oats XI (Mark Richards)

Succession
- Previous: Wild Oats XI (Mark Richards) in 2013
- Next: Comanche (Ken Read) in 2015

The 2014 Sydney to Hobart Yacht Race, sponsored by Rolex and hosted by the Cruising Yacht Club of Australia in Sydney, New South Wales, was the 70th annual running of the "blue water classic" Sydney to Hobart Yacht Race. The 2014 edition began on Sydney Harbour at 1pm on Boxing Day (26 December 2014), before heading south for 628 nautical miles (1,163 km) through the Tasman Sea, past Bass Strait, into Storm Bay and up the River Derwent, to cross the finish line in Hobart, Tasmania.

Line honours were claimed by Wild Oats XI in a time of 2 days, 2 hours, 3 minutes and 26 seconds. It was the yacht's eighth win, breaking the record for most line honours victories. The previous record had been set by Morna (now Kurrewa IV) with 7 victories in 1960. Wild Rose (Roger Hickman) was awarded the Tattersall's Cup.

117 boats started the race and 103 finished.

== Results ==
=== Line Honours ===
| Pos | Sail Number | Yacht | State/Country | Yacht Type | LOA (Metres) | Skipper | Elapsed time d:hh:mm:ss |
|---|---|---|---|---|---|---|---|
| 1 | 10001 | Wild Oats XI | New South Wales | Reichel Pugh 100 | 30.48 | Mark Richards | 2:02:03:26 |
| 2 | 12358 | Comanche | United States | Verdier VPLP 100 Supermaxi | 30.48 | Ken Read | 2:02:52:44 |
| 3 | SYD100 | Ragamuffin 100 | New South Wales | Dovell 100 | 30.48 | Syd Fischer | 2:13:26:00 |
| 4 | USA2121 | Rio 100 | United States | Bakewell White 100 | 30.48 | Manouch Moshayedi | 2:13:37:05 |
| 5 | 52570 | Black Jack | Queensland | Juan-K Volvo Open 70 | 21.50 | Peter Harburg; Mark Bradford | 2:13:39:16 |
| 6 | 52566 | Alive | Tasmania | Reichel Pugh 66 | 22.00 | Philip Turner; Duncan Hine | 2:14:45:38 |
| 7 | CAY65 | Caro | Cayman Islands | Botin 65 | 20.00 | Max Klink | 2:15:12:07 |
| 8 | AUS01 | Ichi Ban | New South Wales | Carkeek 60 | 19.50 | Matt Allen | 2:15:25:17 |
| 9 | AUS03 | Southern Excellence II | New South Wales | Jones 70 | 21.50 | Andrew Wenham | 2:15:59:02 |
| 10 | AUS8899 | Onesails Racing | New South Wales | Farr 55 | 16.76 | Ray Roberts | 2:16:11:24 |
| 11 | SM11 | Scarlet Runner | (Victoria (state)) Victoria | Reichel Pugh 52 | 15.99 | Robert Date | 2:16:31:02 |
| 12 | 7771 | Balance | New South Wales | Farr TP 52 | 15.85 | Paul Clitheroe | 2:17:07:31 |
| 13 | 5200 | Cougar II | Tasmania | Farr TP 52 | 15.85 | Anthony Lyall | 2:17:52:50 |
| 14 | 10007 | Pretty Fly III | New South Wales | Farr Cookson 50 | 15.24 | Colin Woods | 2:18:17:02 ^{1} |
| 15 | AUS5299 | Victoire | New South Wales | Farr Cookson 50 | 15.20 | Darryl Hodgkinson | 2:18:28:35 |
| 16 | 360 | Patrice | New South Wales | Ker 46 | 13.90 | Tony Kirby | 2:18:31:40 |
| 17 | AUS47 | Indian | Western Australia | Carkeek 47 | 14.30 | Craig Carter | 2:18:31:52 |
| 18 | SM24 | Terra Firma | (Victoria (state)) Victoria | Farr Cookson 50 | 15.20 | Nicholas Bartels | 2:18:36:49 |
| 19 | GBR5211L | Frantic | New South Wales | Donovan TP 52 | 15.85 | Michael Martin | 2:19:12:54 |
| 20 | 6953 | Sailors with disAbilities | New South Wales | Nelson Marek TP 52 | 15.85 | David Pescud; Kirk Watson | 2:19:17:02 |
| 21 | 421 | ADA Celestial | New South Wales | Rogers 46 | 14.00 | Sam Haynes | 2:19:30:33 |
| 22 | NOR2 | Spirit of Mateship | Queensland | Davidson Volvo Ocean 60 | 19.44 | Russell McCart | 2:20:43:54 |
| 23 | A5 | PMA Yeah Baby | New South Wales | Welbourn 50 | 15.20 | Marc & Louis Ryckmans | 2:21:07:34 |
| 24 | R33 | Chutzpah | (Victoria (state)) Victoria | Reichel Pugh Caprice 40 | 12.35 | Bruce Taylor | 2:21:49:08 |
| 25 | GBR72L | Louise | (United Kingdom) Great Britain | Berret-Racoupeau Custom 72 | 22.00 | Grant Gordon | 2:22:18:30 |
| 26 | 93 | Merlin | New South Wales | Kaiko 51 | 15.60 | David Forbes; Joseph Earl | 2:22:34:29 |
| 27 | GBR6821R | Titania of Cowes | (United Kingdom) Great Britain | Frers Swan 68 | 21.60 | Richard Dobbs | 2:22:40:51 |
| 28 | SM42 | Simply Fun | (Victoria (state)) Victoria | Judel Vrolijk HH42 | 12.60 | Philip Coombs | 2:23:17:39 |
| 29 | R420 | Cadibarra 8 | (Victoria (state)) Victoria | Jones 42 | 12.90 | Paul Roberts | 3:00:05:35 |
| 30 | CR1 | Optimus Prime | Western Australia | Reichel Pugh Marten 49 | 15.05 | Trevor Taylor | 3:00:25:26 |
| 31 | 8338 | St George Midnight Rambler | New South Wales | Ker 40 | 12.20 | Bob Thomas; Ed Psaltis; Michael Bencsik | 3:00:26:59 |
| 32 | S777 | Primitive Cool | (Victoria (state)) Victoria | Reichel Pugh RP51 | 15.61 | John Newbold | 3:00:41:18 |
| 33 | 8778 | After Midnight | New South Wales | Farr 40 Mod | 12.40 | Mark & Greg Tobin | 3:01:05:13 |
| 34 | RQ64 | Ocean Affinity | Queensland | Reichel Pugh Marten 49 | 15.00 | Stewart Lewis | 3:01:17:54 |
| 35 | 46 | Khalessi | New South Wales | Mills DK46 | 14.10 | Andrew & Pauline Dally | 3:01:49:51 |
| 36 | G4646R | Extasea | (Victoria (state)) Victoria | Mills DK46 | 14.10 | Paul Buchholz | 3:02:09:12 |
| 37 | RF5095 | Dare Devil | New South Wales | Farr Cookson 47 | 14.30 | Sibby Ilzhofer | 3:02:21:21 |
| 38 | NZL1 | Art Equity Mahligai | New South Wales | Murray Burns Dovell Sydney 46 | 14.30 | Murray Owen; Jenny Kings | 3:02:54:31 |
| 39 | ESP6100 | Duende | New South Wales | Judel Vrolijk TP 52 | 15.39 | Damien Parkes | 3:02:58:45 |
| 40 | 11011 | Anger Management | New South Wales | Corby 43 | 13.10 | Richard & Phil Arnall | 3:03:26:34 |
| 41 | F107 | Endorfin | Western Australia | Murray Burns Dovell Sydney 47 | 14.20 | Michael Giles | 3:03:37:45 |
| 42 | 40021 | Guilty Pleasures VI | Queensland | Farr 40 | 12.40 | Joel Bruce; Greg Dorries; Leon Thomas | 3:03:52:40 |
| 43 | B330 | Hartbreaker | (Victoria (state)) Victoria | Reichel Pugh 46 | 14.20 | Antony Walton; Alan Breidahl | 3:04:04:40 |
| 44 | 6037 | Eureka II | Queensland | Murray Burns Dovell Sydney 60 | 18.20 | Malcolm Robertson; Chris Stockdale | 3:04:05:49 |
| 45 | H101 | Tevake II | (Victoria (state)) Victoria | Radford 13.7 | 13.70 | Angus Fletcher | 3:04:48:35 |
| 46 | 3838 | Zen | New South Wales | Murray Burns Dovell Sydney 38 | 11.80 | Gordon Ketelbey | 3:05:06:01 |
| 47 | M45 | Obsession | Tasmania | Mills MAT 1245 | 12.50 | David Creese | 3:05:12:03 |
| 48 | 4545 | Audere | Tasmania | Briand Beneteau First 45 | 13.70 | Michael Pritchard | 3:05:21:38 |
| 49 | A140 | Ariel | New South Wales | Farr Beneteau First 40 | 12.24 | Ron Forster; Phil Damp | 3:05:25:12 |
| 50 | 99 | Pazazz | New South Wales | Farr Cookson 12 | 11.90 | Rob Drury | 3:05:27:33 |
| 51 | MH60 | TSA Management | New South Wales | Murray Burns Dovell Sydney 38 | 11.80 | Tony Levett | 3:05:29:02 |
| 52 | 35 | Imagination | New South Wales | Farr Beneteau First 47.7 | 14.50 | Robin & Annette Hawthorn | 3:05:29:16 |
| 53 | R39 | Jaffa | Western Australia | Runnalls 39 | 12.00 | Terry Posma | 3:05:54:53 |
| 54 | GER6262 | Passion 4 C | Germany | Tripp 56 | 12.00 | Stefan Lehnert | 3:05:40:20 |
| 55 | 6686 | St Jude | New South Wales | Murray Burns Dovell Sydney 47 | 14.20 | Noel Cornish | 3:05:46:40 |
| 56 | 7027 | The Goat | New South Wales | Murray Burns Dovell Sydney 38 | 11.80 | Bruce Foye | 3:05:52:39 |
| 57 | 2001 | Quetzalcoatl | New South Wales | Jones 40 | 12.33 | Antony Sweetapple | 3:05:57:39 |
| 58 | 4343 | Wild Rose | New South Wales | Farr 43 | 13.11 | Roger Hickman | 3:07:04:43 |
| 59 | 370 | She's The Culprit | New South Wales | Inglis-Jones 39 Modified | 11.96 | Glen Bulmer | 3:07:34:00 |
| 60 | 88888 | Samurai Jack | Queensland | Farr 39ml Mod | 12.00 | Michael Lazzarini | 3:07:35:57 |
| 61 | 6841 | Papillon | New South Wales | Joubert-Nivelt Archambault 40RC | 12.00 | Phil Molony | 3:07:38:00 |
| 62 | 6834 | Breakthrough | New South Wales | Farr Beneteau First 40 | 12.24 | Jonathan Stone; Mathew Vadas | 3:07:39:07 |
| 63 | 33345 | Black Sheep | New South Wales | Briand Beneteau 45 | 13.70 | Derek & Martin Sheppard | 3:08:01:40 |
| 64 | B44 | Twitch | (Victoria (state)) Victoria | Farr Beneteau First 44.7 | 13.40 | Tony Ellis | 3:08:05:58 |
| 65 | 7209 | Katharsis II | Poland | Humphrey Oyster 72 | 21.00 | Mariusz Koper | 3:08:29:03 ^{2} |
| 66 | 6515 | Mistraal | Tasmania | Farr Beneteau 57 | 17.80 | Jacinta & Brett Cooper | 3:08:49:26 ^{3} |
| 67 | RQ2404 | Not A Diamond | Queensland | Farr Beneteau First 40 | 12.30 | David Redfern | 3:09:19:46 |
| 68 | B40 | Concubine | South Australia | Farr Beneteau First 40 | 12.30 | Jason Ward; Shevaun Bruland | 3:10:59:09 |
| 69 | 248 | Wax Lyrical | New South Wales | Jeppesen X50 | 15.20 | Les Goodridge | 3:11:08:39 ^{3} |
| 70 | 6755 | Ausreo | New South Wales | Farr Beneteau 47.7 | 14.00 | Ian Creak | 3:11:14:35 |
| 71 | 262 | Helsal 3 | Tasmania | Adams 20 | 20.00 | Rob Fisher; John Davis | 3:11:21:20 ^{3} |
| 72 | HY3600 | Kraken | Western Australia | Andrieu Jeanneau Sunfast 3600 | 10.80 | Todd Giraudo | 3:11:22:38 ^{3} |
| 73 | 5612 | Abracadabra | New South Wales | Tripp 47 | 14.33 | James Murchison | 3:11:24:13 |
| 74 | 294 | Love & War | New South Wales | Sparkman & Stephens S&S 47 | 14.21 | Simon Kurts | 3:11:49:48 ^{3} |
| 75 | 4883 | Lets Go | New South Wales | Adams-Radford 52 | 15.20 | Danielle Ovenden | 3:12:01:59 |
| 76 | M762 | Inner Circle | New South Wales | Farr 40 IOR | 12.24 | Darren Cooney | 3:12:03:16 ^{3} |
| 77 | L77 | Whistler | Tasmania | Murray Burns Dovell MBD36 | 11.00 | John Hyslop | 3:12:14:44 |
| 78 | SA346 | Enchantress | South Australia | Muirhead 11 | 11.00 | John Willoughby | 3:12:24:26 ^{3} |
| 79 | S9797 | Ninety Seven | (Victoria (state)) Victoria | Farr 47 | 14.30 | Alan Saunders | 3:15:34:36 |
| 80 | R880 | Alien | (Victoria (state)) Victoria | Lidgard 36 | 10.90 | Justin Brenan | 3:15:42:46 |
| 81 | 1236 | Local Hero | New South Wales | Murray Burns Dovell BH36 | 10.97 | Peter Mosely | 3:15:46:00 |
| 82 | 9359T | Clipper Ventures 10 | (United Kingdom) Great Britain | Dubois Clipper 68 | 20.77 | Piers Dudin | 3:15:55:35 |
| 83 | SM360 | Wild Side | (Victoria (state)) Victoria | Murray Burns Dovell Sydney 36 CR | 10.97 | Martin Vaughan | 3:16:31:08 |
| 84 | 6723 | Geomatic Allegro | New South Wales | Warwick 67 | 20.30 | Adrian Lewis | 3:17:29:11 |
| 85 | 7075 | Martela | Tasmania | Jeppesen IMX 38 | 11.30 | Anthony Williams | 3:17:53:16 |
| 86 | SM117 | Tilting at Windmills | (Victoria (state)) Victoria | Joubert Modified 42 | 12.80 | Thorry Gunnersen; John Alexander | 3:17:55:08 |
| 87 | 2170 | Ray White Spirit of Koomooloo | Queensland | Sparkmans & Stephens S&S 48 | 14.50 | Mike Freebairn | 3:18:15:00 |
| 88 | 8339 | Luna Sea | New South Wales | Hick 35 | 10.50 | James Cameron | 3:19:47:29 |
| 89 | G54 | Moody Buoys | (Victoria (state)) Victoria | Dixon Moody DS54 | 17.20 | Trevor & Steven Richardson | 3:20:13:02 |
| 90 | 6891 | Takani | New South Wales | Judel Vrolijk Hanse 495 | 15.40 | James Whittle | 3:20:14:56 |
| 91 | SM377 | Bacardi | (Victoria (state)) Victoria | Peterson 44 | 13.40 | Martin Power | 3:21:08:00 |
| 92 | TYC4 | Magic Miles | Tasmania | Briand Dynamique 62 | 18.70 | Michael Crew | 3:21:16:15 |
| 93 | 8975A | Zora | New South Wales | J&J Yachts Salona 45 | 13.55 | Phil King | 3:21:49:14 |
| 94 | POL8855 | Selma Expeditions | Poland | Azueppe-Brenner 67 | 20.30 | Krzysztof Jasica; Piotr Kuzniar | 3:22:34:01 |
| 95 | 6654 | Isabella | New South Wales | Judel Vrolijk Hanse 400E | 12.10 | John Nolan | 3:23:35:17 |
| 96 | 7551 | Flying Fish Arctos | New South Wales | Radford McIntyre 55 | 15.36 | Gregor McGowan | 3:23:50:59 |
| 97 | 3430 | Quikpoint Azzurro | New South Wales | Sparkman & Stephens S&S 34 | 10.10 | Shane Kearns | 3:23:51:09 |
| 98 | B1 | Trybooking.com | (Victoria (state)) Victoria | Dixon Moody DS54 | 17.20 | Grant Dunoon | 3:23:54:48 |
| 99 | C444 | Namadgi | Australian Capital Territory | Humphreys Elan 444 | 13.90 | Paul Jones | 4:00:05:06 |
| 100 | F111 | C.Q.R.iT Inca | Australian Capital Territory | Lavranos Vickers 41 MkII | 12.50 | Noel Sneddon | 4:00:11:54 |
| 101 | A19 | Maluka of Kermandie | Tasmania | Gale Ranger 30 | 9.01 | Sean Langman | 4:00:43:09 |
| 102 | RQ1920 | Charlie's Dream | Queensland | Holland Cole Lowe Bluewater 450 | 13.70 | Peter Lewis | 4:00:43:12 |
| 103 | SA06 | Southern Myth | South Australia | Giles Design Sloop 41 | 12.50 | Peter Riddell | 4:02:01:34 |
| DNF | 6461 | A Cunning Plan | (Victoria (state)) Victoria | Farr Cookson 12 | 12.00 | Jon Lechte | Retired-Rig Damage |
| DNF | MH115 | Bear Necessity | New South Wales | Jackett C&C 115 | 11.50 | John Blair | Retired-Rudder Damage |
| DNF | 10000 | Brindabella | New South Wales | Jutson 80 | 24.08 | Jim Cooney | Retired-Rudder Bearing Damage |
| DNF | 8824 | Chancellor | New South Wales | Farr Beneteau 47.7 | 14.80 | Edward Tooher | Retired-Disqualified ^{4} |
| DNF | NZL70000 | Giacomo | New Zealand | Juan-K Volvo Open 70 | 21.50 | Jim Delegat | Retired-Dismasted |
| DNF | 554 | Landfall | New South Wales | Sparkman & Stephens S&S 54 | 13.40 | Michael Strong | Retired-Sail Damage |
| DNF | 8975 | Last Tango | New South Wales | J&J Yachts Salona 44 | 13.60 | Phillip King; Wendy Tuck | Retired-Sail Damage |
| DNF | 8008 | Occasional Coarse Language Too | New South Wales | Ker Sydney GTS 43 | 13.10 | Warwick Sherman | Retired-Steering Damage |
| DNF | SYD 1000 | Perpetual Loyal | New South Wales | Juan Yacht Design Juan-K 100 | 30.48 | Anthony Bell | Retired-Hull Damage |
| DNF | 9242 | Sextant | New South Wales | Jeppesen XC42 | 12.80 | Denis Doyle; Lynne Smith | Retired-Undisclosed Reasons |
| DNF | S3 | Tina of Melbourne | (Victoria (state)) Victoria | Sparkman & Stephens S&S 37 | 11.20 | Andy Doolan | Retired-Hull Damage |
| DNF | 6377 | Triton | New South Wales | Lyons-Cawse LC60 | 18.30 | Michael Cranitch; David Gotze | Retired-Forestay Damage |
| DNF | AUS11888 | Wedgetail | Queensland | Reichel Pugh RP55 | 16.80 | Bill Wild | Retired-Mast Damage |
| DNF | 335 | Willyama | New South Wales | Farr Beneteau First 40 | 12.24 | Richard Barron | Retired-Torn Mainsail |

Notes

^1 – Pretty Fly III were given a 13 minutes redress to be subtracted off their elapsed time under RRS 62 by the International Jury due to an incident where their provided assistance after Patrice encouraged rudder problems on the third day of the race.
^2 – Envy Scooters were given a 5 minutes penalty to be added onto their elapsed time by the International Jury due to breaching RRS Rule 12 in a collision with Imagination at the start of the race in Sydney Harbour.
^3 – Mistraal, Wax Lyrical, Helsal 3, Kraken, Love & War, Inner Circle & Enchantress were all given a 105 minutes redress to be subtracted off their elapsed time under RRS 62 by the International Jury due to an incident where their provided assistance after a light aircraft crashed into the ocean near Storm Bay on the fourth day of the race.
^4 – Chancellor were disqualified from the race and was scored as a DNF by the Race Committee due to breaching Sailing Instruction Rules 44.1 & 44.2 by failing to report into race control within one hour of passing the Green Cape mandatory safety check-in point before entering the Bass Strait during the race

=== Overall Handicap ===
| Pos | Division Number | Sail Number | Yacht | State/Country | Yacht Type | LOA (Metres) | Skipper | Elapsed time d:hh:mm:ss |
|---|---|---|---|---|---|---|---|---|
| 1 | 4 | 4343 | Wild Rose | New South Wales | Farr 43 | 13.11 | Roger Hickman | 3:10:47:43 |
| 2 | 2 | R33 | Chutzpah | (Victoria (state)) Victoria | Reichel Pugh Caprice 40 | 12.35 | Bruce Taylor | 3:11:26:01 |
| 3 | 3 | A140 | Ariel | New South Wales | Farr Beneteau First 40 | 12.24 | Ron Forster; Phil Damp | 3:11:32:10 |
| 4 | 3 | 8778 | After Midnight | New South Wales | Farr 40 Mod | 12.40 | Mark & Greg Tobin | 3:11:41:04 |
| 5 | 3 | 3838 | Zen | New South Wales | Murray Burns Dovell Sydney 38 | 11.80 | Gordon Ketelbey | 3:12:39:32 |
| 6 | 3 | MH60 | TSA Management | New South Wales | Murray Burns Dovell Sydney 38 | 11.80 | Tony Levett | 3:13:09:17 |
| 7 | 4 | 294 | Love & War | New South Wales | Sparkman & Stephens S&S 47 | 14.21 | Simon Kurts | 3:13:10:17 |
| 8 | 3 | 4545 | Audere | Tasmania | Briand Beneteau First 45 | 13.70 | Michael Pritchard | 3:13:29:00 |
| 9 | 1 | 360 | Patrice | New South Wales | Ker 46 | 13.90 | Tony Kirby | 3:13:29:18 |
| 10 | 3 | 7027 | The Goat | New South Wales | Murray Burns Dovell Sydney 38 | 11.80 | Bruce Foye | 3:13:30:34 |
| 11 | 2 | 421 | ADA Celestial | New South Wales | Rogers 46 | 14.00 | Sam Haynes | 3:13:32:03 |
| 12 | 3 | 6834 | Breakthrough | New South Wales | Farr Beneteau First 40 | 12.24 | Jonathan Stone; Mathew Vadas | 3:13:33:18 |
| 13 | 4 | A19 | Maluka of Kermandie | Tasmania | Gale Ranger 30 | 9.01 | Sean Langman | 3:13:53:12 |
| 14 | 3 | 35 | Imagination | New South Wales | Farr Beneteau First 47.7 | 14.50 | Robin & Annette Hawthorn | 3:14:09:59 |
| 15 | 2 | R420 | Cadibarra 8 | (Victoria (state)) Victoria | Jones 42 | 12.90 | Paul Roberts | 3:14:17:43 |
| 16 | 2 | 93 | Merlin | New South Wales | Kaiko 51 | 15.60 | David Forbes; Joseph Earl | 3:14:18:46 |
| 17 | 3 | 6841 | Papillon | New South Wales | Joubert-Nivelt Archambault 40RC | 12.00 | Phil Molony | 3:14:24:08 |
| 18 | 2 | 8338 | St George Midnight Rambler | New South Wales | Ker 40 | 12.20 | Bob Thomas; Ed Psaltis; Michael Bencsik | 3:14:25:57 |
| 19 | 4 | SA346 | Enchantress | South Australia | Muirhead 11 | 11.00 | John Willoughby | 3:14:25:59 |
| 20 | 2 | SM42 | Simply Fun | (Victoria (state)) Victoria | Judel Vrolijk HH42 | 12.60 | Philip Coombs | 3:14:54:27 |
| 21 | 4 | HY3600 | Kraken | Western Australia | Andrieu Jeanneau Sunfast 3600 | 10.80 | Todd Giraudo | 3:15:12:45 |
| 22 | 3 | 99 | Pazazz | New South Wales | Farr Cookson 12 | 11.90 | Rob Drury | 3:15:17:47 |
| 23 | 4 | M762 | Inner Circle | New South Wales | Farr 40 IOR | 12.24 | Darren Cooney | 3:15:19:57 |
| 24 | 2 | 46 | Khalessi | New South Wales | Mills DK46 | 14.10 | Andrew & Pauline Dally | 3:15:20:31 |
| 25 | 3 | M45 | Obsession | Tasmania | Mills MAT 1245 | 12.50 | David Creese | 3:15:37:23 |
| 26 | 2 | F107 | Endorfin | Western Australia | Murray Burns Dovell Sydney 47 | 14.20 | Michael Giles | 3:15:48:20 |
| 27 | 3 | 40021 | Guilty Pleasures VI | Queensland | Farr 40 | 12.40 | Joel Bruce; Greg Dorries; Leon Thomas | 3:15:51:59 |
| 28 | 1 | SM11 | Scarlet Runner | (Victoria (state)) Victoria | Reichel Pugh 52 | 15.99 | Robert Date | 3:15:52:21 |
| 29 | 2 | G4646R | Extasea | (Victoria (state)) Victoria | Mills DK46 | 14.10 | Paul Buchholz | 3:16:01:12 |
| 30 | 3 | RQ2404 | Not A Diamond | Queensland | Farr Beneteau First 40 | 12.30 | David Redfern | 3:16:04:47 |
| 31 | 1 | SM24 | Terra Firma | (Victoria (state)) Victoria | Farr Cookson 50 | 15.20 | Nicholas Bartels | 3:16:07:47 |
| 32 | 2 | GBR6821R | Titania of Cowes | (United Kingdom) Great Britain | Frers Swan 68 | 21.60 | Richard Dobbs | 3:16:21:04 |
| 33 | 4 | 3430 | Quikpoint Azzurro | New South Wales | Sparkman & Stephens S&S 34 | 10.10 | Shane Kearns | 3:16:28:19 |
| 34 | 1 | A5 | PMA Yeah Baby | New South Wales | Welbourn 50 | 15.20 | Marc & Louis Ryckmans | 3:16:37:11 |
| 35 | 4 | L77 | Whistler | Tasmania | Murray Burns Dovell MBD36 | 11.00 | John Hyslop | 3:16:37:35 |
| 36 | 1 | 7771 | Balance | New South Wales | Farr TP 52 | 15.85 | Paul Clitheroe | 3:16:38:08 |
| 37 | 3 | B44 | Twitch | (Victoria (state)) Victoria | Farr Beneteau First 44.7 | 13.40 | Tony Ellis | 3:16:45:01 |
| 38 | 1 | AUS47 | Indian | Western Australia | Carkeek 47 | 14.30 | Craig Carter | 3:17:05:07 |
| 39 | 3 | R39 | Jaffa | Western Australia | Runnalls 39 | 12.00 | Terry Posma | 3:17:17:46 |
| 40 | 3 | 33345 | Black Sheep | New South Wales | Briand Beneteau 45 | 13.70 | Derek & Martin Sheppard | 3:17:28:16 |
| 41 | 3 | 6755 | Ausreo | New South Wales | Farr Beneteau 47.7 | 14.00 | Ian Creak | 3:17:34:10 |
| 42 | 2 | CR1 | Optimus Prime | Western Australia | Reichel Pugh Marten 49 | 15.05 | Trevor Taylor | 3:17:35:18 |
| 43 | 3 | B40 | Concubine | South Australia | Farr Beneteau First 40 | 12.30 | Jason Ward; Shevaun Bruland | 3:17:42:28 |
| 44 | 0 | 10007 | Pretty Fly III | New South Wales | Farr Cookson 50 | 15.24 | Colin Woods | 3:17:48:53 |
| 45 | 0 | AUS5299 | Victoire | New South Wales | Farr Cookson 50 | 15.20 | Darryl Hodgkinson | 3:17:52:34 |
| 46 | 1 | 5200 | Cougar II | Tasmania | Farr TP 52 | 15.85 | Anthony Lyall | 3:17:55:37 |
| 47 | 1 | 6953 | Sailors with disAbilities | New South Wales | Nelson Marek TP 52 | 15.85 | David Pescud; Kirk Watson | 3:18:01:33 |
| 48 | 1 | GBR5211L | Frantic | New South Wales | Donovan TP 52 | 15.85 | Michael Martin | 3:18:28:17 |
| 49 | 1 | AUS8899 | Onesails Racing | New South Wales | Farr 55 | 16.76 | Ray Roberts | 3:18:30:28 |
| 50 | 4 | R880 | Alien | (Victoria (state)) Victoria | Lidgard 36 | 10.90 | Justin Brenan | 3:19:13:17 |
| 51 | 2 | 6686 | St Jude | New South Wales | Murray Burns Dovell Sydney 47 | 14.20 | Noel Cornish | 3:19:14:00 |
| 52 | 2 | RF5095 | Dare Devil | New South Wales | Farr Cookson 47 | 14.30 | Sibby Ilzhofer | 3:19:18:32 |
| 53 | 2 | 11011 | Anger Management | New South Wales | Corby 43 | 13.10 | Richard & Phil Arnall | 3:19:53:21 |
| 54 | 4 | 1236 | Local Hero | New South Wales | Murray Burns Dovell BH36 | 10.97 | Peter Mosely | 3:19:58:46 |
| 55 | 4 | SM360 | Wild Side | (Victoria (state)) Victoria | Murray Burns Dovell Sydney 36 CR | 10.97 | Martin Vaughan | 3:20:03:35 |
| 56 | 4 | 2170 | Ray White Spirit of Koomooloo | Queensland | Sparkmans & Stephens S&S 48 | 14.50 | Mike Freebairn | 3:20:14:08 |
| 57 | 0 | CAY65 | Caro | Cayman Islands | Botin 65 | 20.00 | Max Klink | 3:20:20:17 |
| 58 | 4 | 8339 | Luna Sea | New South Wales | Hick 35 | 10.50 | James Cameron | 3:21:32:08 |
| 59 | 4 | 7075 | Martela | Tasmania | Jeppesen IMX 38 | 11.30 | Anthony Williams | 3:21:39:47 |
| 60 | 4 | SM117 | Tilting at Windmills | (Victoria (state)) Victoria | Joubert Modified 42 | 12.80 | Thorry Gunnersen; John Alexander | 3:22:03:19 |
| 61 | 4 | SA06 | Southern Myth | South Australia | Giles Design Sloop 41 | 12.50 | Peter Riddell | 3:22:47:28 |
| 62 | 1 | GBR72L | Louise | (United Kingdom) Great Britain | Berret-Racoupeau Custom 72 | 22.00 | Grant Gordon | 3:23:03:25 |
| 63 | 0 | AUS01 | Ichi Ban | New South Wales | Carkeek 60 | 19.50 | Matt Allen | 3:23:11:44 |
| 64 | 4 | SM377 | Bacardi | (Victoria (state)) Victoria | Peterson 44 | 13.40 | Martin Power | 3:23:22:07 |
| 65 | 2 | 6037 | Eureka II | Queensland | Murray Burns Dovell Sydney 60 | 18.20 | Malcolm Robertson; Chris Stockdale | 3:23:57:30 |
| 66 | 1 | B330 | Hartbreaker | (Victoria (state)) Victoria | Reichel Pugh 46 | 14.20 | Antony Walton; Alan Breidahl | 4:01:09:05 |
| 67 | 2 | 7209 | Katharsis II | Poland | Humphrey Oyster 72 | 21.00 | Mariusz Koper | 4:01:32:49 |
| 68 | 2 | 4883 | Lets Go | New South Wales | Adams-Radford 52 | 15.20 | Danielle Ovenden | 4:02:24:10 |
| 69 | 2 | GER6262 | Passion 4 C | Germany | Tripp 56 | 12.00 | Stefan Lehnert | 4:02:24:39 |
| 70 | 1 | S777 | Primitive Cool | (Victoria (state)) Victoria | Reichel Pugh RP51 | 15.61 | John Newbold | 4:02:25:12 |
| 71 | 0 | 10001 | Wild Oats XI | New South Wales | Reichel Pugh 100 | 30.48 | Mark Richards | 4:02:48:47 |
| 72 | 0 | 52566 | Alive | Tasmania | Reichel Pugh 66 | 22.00 | Philip Turner; Duncan Hine | 4:03:02:10 |
| 73 | 0 | 12358 | Comanche | United States | Verdier VPLP 100 Supermaxi | 30.48 | Ken Read | 4:03:37:15 |
| 74 | 4 | 6654 | Isabella | New South Wales | Judel Vrolijk Hanse 400E | 12.10 | John Nolan | 4:03:53:22 |
| 75 | 2 | S9797 | Ninety Seven | (Victoria (state)) Victoria | Farr 47 | 14.30 | Alan Saunders | 4:06:54:09 |
| 76 | 3 | POL8855 | Selma Expeditions | Poland | Azueppe-Brenner 67 | 20.30 | Krzysztof Jasica; Piotr Kuzniar | 4:07:10:21 |
| 77 | 0 | AUS03 | Southern Excellence II | New South Wales | Jones 70 | 21.50 | Andrew Wenham | 4:07:31:33 |
| 78 | 0 | USA2121 | Rio 100 | United States | Bakewell White 100 | 30.48 | Manouch Moshayedi | 4:09:58:59 |
| 79 | 2 | 9359T | Clipper Ventures 10 | (United Kingdom) Great Britain | Dubois Clipper 68 | 20.77 | Piers Dudin | 4:10:12:54 |
| 80 | 0 | 52570 | Black Jack | Queensland | Juan-K Volvo Open 70 | 21.50 | Peter Harburg; Mark Bradford | 4:10:50:50 |
| 81 | 0 | SYD100 | Ragamuffin 100 | New South Wales | Dovell 100 | 30.48 | Syd Fischer | 4:21:49:45 |
| DNF | 3 | 6461 | A Cunning Plan | (Victoria (state)) Victoria | Farr Cookson 12 | 12.00 | Jon Lechte | Retired-Rig Damage |
| DNF | 4 | MH115 | Bear Necessity | New South Wales | Jackett C&C 115 | 11.50 | John Blair | Retired-Rudder Damage |
| DNF | 3 | 8824 | Chancellor | New South Wales | Farr Beneteau 47.7 | 14.80 | Edward Tooher | Retired-Disqualified ^{1} |
| DNF | 0 | NZL70000 | Giacomo | New Zealand | Juan-K Volvo Open 70 | 21.50 | Jim Delegat | Retired-Dismasted |
| DNF | 2 | 8008 | Occasional Coarse Language Too | New South Wales | Ker Sydney GTS 43 | 13.10 | Warwick Sherman | Retired-Steering Damage |
| DNF | 0 | SYD 1000 | Perpetual Loyal | New South Wales | Juan Yacht Design Juan-K 100 | 30.48 | Anthony Bell | Retired-Hull Damage |
| DNF | 4 | S3 | Tina of Melbourne | (Victoria (state)) Victoria | Sparkman & Stephens S&S 37 | 11.20 | Andy Doolan | Retired-Hull Damage |
| DNF | 1 | 6377 | Triton | New South Wales | Lyons-Cawse LC60 | 18.30 | Michael Cranitch; David Gotze | Retired-Forestay Damage |
| DNF | 1 | AUS11888 | Wedgetail | Queensland | Reichel Pugh RP55 | 16.80 | Bill Wild | Retired-Mast Damage |
| DNF | 3 | 335 | Willyama | New South Wales | Farr Beneteau First 40 | 12.24 | Richard Barron | Retired-Torn Mainsail |

Notes

^1 – Chancellor were disqualified from the race and was scored as a DNF by the Race Committee due to breaching Sailing Instruction Rules 44.1 & 44.2 by failing to report into race control within one hour of passing the Green Cape mandatory safety check-in point before entering the Bass Strait during the race.
