= 2013 Sydney to Hobart Yacht Race =

2013 annual yacht race in Australia

69th Sydney to Hobart Yacht Race
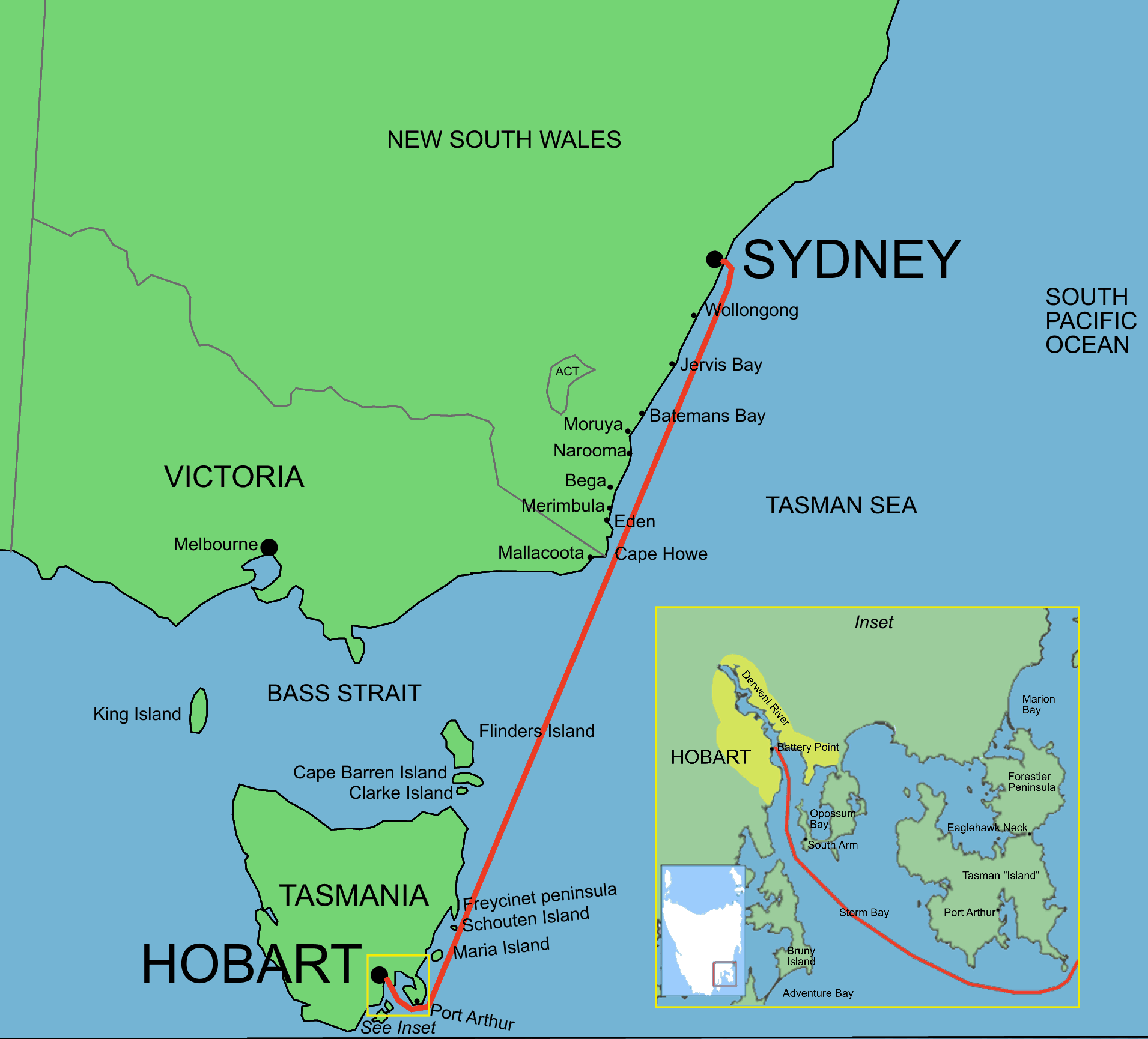
- The Sydney to Hobart route

Event information
- Type: Yacht
- Dates: 26–31 December 2013
- Sponsor: Rolex
- Host city: Sydney, Hobart
- Boats: 94
- Distance: 628 nautical miles (1,163 km)
- Website: Website archive

Results
- Winner (2013): Wild Oats XI (Mark Richards)

Succession
- Previous: Wild Oats XI (Mark Richards) in 2012
- Next: Wild Oats XI (Mark Richards) in 2014

The 2013 Sydney to Hobart Yacht Race, sponsored by Rolex and hosted by the Cruising Yacht Club of Australia in Sydney, New South Wales, is the 69th annual running of the "blue water classic" Sydney to Hobart Yacht Race. The 2013 edition began on Sydney Harbour at 1pm on Boxing Day (26 December 2013), before heading south for 628 nautical miles (1,163 km) through the Tasman Sea, past Bass Strait, into Storm Bay and up the River Derwent, to cross the finish line in Hobart, Tasmania.

Line honours were claimed by Wild Oats XI in a time of 2 days, 6 hours, 7 minutes and 27 seconds. It was the yacht's seventh win, equaling Morna's (now Kurrewa IV's) 1960 record for most line honours victories. Victoire was awarded the Tattersall's Cup.

94 starters left the harbour and 84 crossed the finish line.

== Results ==
=== Line Honours ===
Pos	Sail Number	Yacht	State/Country	Yacht Type	LOA (Metres)	Skipper	Elapsed time d:hh:mm:ss
1	10001	Wild Oats XI	New South Wales	Reichel Pugh 100	30.48	Mark Richards	2:06:07:27
2	SYD 1000	Perpetual Loyal	New South Wales	Juan Yacht Design Juan-K 100	30.48	Anthony Bell	2:09:19:56
3	SYD 100	Ragamuffin 100	New South Wales	Elliot 100 Maxi	30.48	Syd Fischer	2:10:48:00
4	52570	Black Jack	Queensland	Juan-K Volvo Open 70	21.50	Peter Harburg	2:15:09:34
5	HKG 1997	Beau Geste	Hong Kong	Botin 80	24.40	Karl Kwok	2:15:10:45
6	NZL70000	Giacomo	New Zealand	Juan-K Volvo Open 70	21.50	Jim Delegat	2:15:11:51
7	AUS 10	Wild Thing	New South Wales	Jones-Barrett 100 Supermaxi	30.48	Grant Wharington	2:15:38:22
8	AUS 01	Ichi Ban	New South Wales	Carkeek 60	19.50	Matt Allen	2:17:04:24
9	AUS5299	Victoire	New South Wales	Farr Cookson 50	15.20	Darryl Hodgkinson	2:19:00:32
10	GER6700	Varuna	Germany	Ker 51	15.00	Jens Kellinghusen	2:19:30:01
11	GBR8200R	Nikata	(United Kingdom) Great Britain	Frers Swan 82	24.80	Tom Brewer	2:22:24:09
12	AUS03	Southern Excellence II	New South Wales	Jones 70	21.50	Andrew Wenham	2:23:11:38
13	MLT10010	Zefiro	Cyprus	Farr 100	30.20	Gerhard Ruether	3:00:06:19
14	10007	Pretty Fly III	New South Wales	Farr Cookson 50	15.24	Colin Woods	3:00:06:55
15	421	Celestial	New South Wales	Rogers 46	14.00	Sam Haynes	3:01:08:22
16	SM602	Veloce	(Victoria (state)) Victoria	Elliott 44CR	13.70	Phil Simpfendorfer	3:02:36:11
17	10000	Brindabella	New South Wales	Jutson 80	24.08	Jim Cooney	3:03:18:37
18	S777	Primitive Cool	(Victoria (state)) Victoria	Reichel Pugh RP51	15.61	John Newbold	3:03:20:01
19	RQ5050	Kerumba	Queensland	Kers 50 C/R	15.20	Tam Faragher	3:03:23:09
20	M497	Venture 2	New South Wales	Elliott 50	15.20	Stephan Chapman	3:05:07:48
21	GBR5211L	Frantic	New South Wales	Donovan TP 52	15.85	Michael Martin	3:05:45:25
22	NOR2	Spirit of Mateship	Queensland	Davidson Volvo Ocean 60	19.44	Russell McCart	3:05:50:43
23	R33	Chutzpah	(Victoria (state)) Victoria	Reichel Pugh Caprice 40	12.35	Bruce Taylor	3:06:57:20
24	RQ64	Ocean Affinity	Queensland	Reichel Pugh Marten 49	15.00	Stewart Lewis	3:09:05:17
25	8338	Midnight Rambler	New South Wales	Ker 40	12.20	Bob Thomas; Ed Psaltis; Michael Bencsik	3:13:42:08
26	67	ColorTile	New South Wales	Sayer 44.9	13.70	Warren & Kristy Buchan	3:13:52:33
27	6837	Minerva	New South Wales	Reichel Pugh DK43	13.00	Timothy & William Cox	3:16:10:17
28	GBR730X	Derry-Londonderry-Doire	(United Kingdom) Great Britain	Castro Clipper 70	21.33	Sean McCarter	3:16:42:28
29	SIN4321	Zanzibar	Singapore	Humphreys 42	12.78	Jonathan Mahony	3:18:27:36
30	7878	Faceboat Sailors with disABILITIES	New South Wales	Lyons 54	16.20	David Pescud; Kirk Watson	3:18:28:50
31	G14	Senna	(Victoria (state)) Victoria	Briand Beneteau First 45	13.60	Chris Manton; Brendan Garner	3:19:08:49
32	9988	Brannew	New South Wales	Farr Beneteau First 40 CR	12.24	Chris Bran	3:19:28:28
33	HY161	Knee Deep	Western Australia	Farr 49	16.54	Philip Childs	3:19:49:46
34	NZL1	Art Equity Mahligai	New South Wales	Murray Burns Dovell Sydney 46	14.30	Murray Owen; Jenny Kings	3:19:55:38
35	YC1545	Shining Sea	South Australia	Briand Beneteau First 45	13.60	Andrew Corletto	3:20:04:34 ^{1}
36	GBR9359T	CV10	(United Kingdom) Great Britain	Dubois Clipper 68	20.77	James Dobie	3:20:15:15
37	S390	Jazz Player-Think Pink Foundation	(Victoria (state)) Victoria	Bakewell-White 39	11.92	Andrew Lawrence	3:20:23:56
38	GBR726X	GREAT Britain	(United Kingdom) Great Britain	Castro Clipper 70	21.33	Simon Talbot	3:20:43:08
39	GBR729X	Old Pulteney	(United Kingdom) Great Britain	Castro Clipper 70	21.33	Patrick Van Der Zijden	3:20:55:28
40	GBR720X	One DLL	(United Kingdom) Great Britain	Castro Clipper 70	21.33	Oliver Cotterell	3:21:03:43
41	6686	St Jude	New South Wales	Murray Burns Dovell Sydney 47	14.20	Noel Cornish	3:21:11:27
42	GBR6821R	Titania of Cowes	(United Kingdom) Great Britain	Frers Swan 68	21.60	Richard Dobbs	3:06:12:35 ^{2}
43	4100	The Banshee	New South Wales	Murray Burns Dovell MBD41	12.50	Corinne Feldmann; Rob Francis	3:21:24:54
44	GBR724X	Switzerland	(United Kingdom) Great Britain	Castro Clipper 70	21.33	Victoria Ellis	3:21:59:14
45	4343	Wild Rose	New South Wales	Farr 43	13.11	Roger Hickman	3:22:59:38
46	33345	Black Sheep	New South Wales	Briand Beneteau 45	13.70	Derek & Martin Sheppard	3:23:04:25
47	7771	Balance	New South Wales	Briand Beneteau 45	13.68	Paul Clitheroe	3:23:16:12
48	GBR728X	PSP Logistics	(United Kingdom) Great Britain	Castro Clipper 70	21.33	Christopher Hollis	3:23:31:39
49	GBR731X	Jamaica Get All Right	(United Kingdom) Great Britain	Castro Clipper 70	21.33	Peter Stirling	3:23:35:57
50	3838	Zen	New South Wales	Murray Burns Dovell Sydney 38	11.80	Gordon Ketelbey	3:23:42:42
51	6841	Papillon	New South Wales	Joubert-Nivelt Archambault 40RC	12.00	Phil Molony	3:23:43:00
52	GBR722X	Qingdao	(United Kingdom) Great Britain	Castro Clipper 70	21.33	Gareth Glover	3:23:58:38
53	GBR9354T	CV5	(United Kingdom) Great Britain	Dubois Clipper 68	20.77	Piers Dudin	4:00:00:57
54	ESP6100	Duende	New South Wales	Judel Vrolijk TP 52	15.39	Damien Parkes	4:00:24:24
55	GBR723X	Mission Performance	(United Kingdom) Great Britain	Castro Clipper 70	21.33	Matthew Mitchell	4:01:35:08 ^{3}
56	SM381	Mille Sabords	(Victoria (state)) Victoria	Murray Burns Dovell Sydney 38	11.80	Stephane Howarth	4:01:40:57
57	A140	Ariel	New South Wales	Farr Beneteau First 40	12.24	Ron Forster; Phil Damp	4:01:56:35
58	5656	Mondo	Queensland	Murray Burns Dovell Sydney 38	11.80	Ray Sweeney	4:02:13:01
59	8975	Last Tango	New South Wales	J&J Yachts Salona 44	13.60	Phillip King	4:02:14:42
60	262	Helsal 3	Tasmania	Adams 20	20.00	Paul Mara; Paul Jackson	4:02:16:59
61	6834	Breakthrough	New South Wales	Farr Beneteau First 40	12.24	Jonathan Stone; Mathew Vadas	4:02:21:04
62	GBR727X	Team Garmin	(United Kingdom) Great Britain	Castro Clipper 70	21.33	Mark Burkes	4:02:27:53
63	6755	Pennant Hills Ford	New South Wales	Farr Beneteau 47.7	14.00	Ian Creak	4:02:32:52
64	MH60	TSA Management	New South Wales	Murray Burns Dovell Sydney 38	11.80	Tony Levett	4:02:32:52
65	A169	Nautical Circle	New South Wales	Nivelt Archambault 40	12.00	Ian Prentice	4:02:55:50
66	R75	Halcyon	(Victoria (state)) Victoria	Farr Beneteau First 40	12.24	Chris Tucker	4:03:11:48
67	GBR725X	Invest Africa	(United Kingdom) Great Britain	Castro Clipper 70	21.33	Richard Gould	4:04:27:55
68	M495	Geomatic	(Victoria (state)) Victoria	Judel Vrolijk Hanse 495	15.40	Adrian Lewis	4:04:37:51
69	B331	Audacious	(Victoria (state)) Victoria	Murray Burns Dovell Sydney 38	11.80	Glen Clinnick	4:04:55:20
70	7075	Martela	Tasmania	Jeppesen IMX 38	11.30	Anthony Williams	4:05:01:46
71	N40	One For The Road	New South Wales	Joubert Nivelt Archambault 40	12.00	Kym Butler	4:05:35:00
72	6689	Copernicus	New South Wales	Radford 12	11.99	Greg Zyner	4:06:47:02
73	TYC4	Magic Miles	Tasmania	Briand Dynamique 62	18.70	Michael Crew	4:07:01:03
74	11407	Shepherd Centre	New South Wales	Farr Beneteau First 40.7	11.92	Hugh Torode	4:07:03:18
75	370	She's The Culprit	New South Wales	Inglis-Jones 39 Modified	11.96	Glen Picasso	4:07:13:23
76	SM117	Tilting at Windmills	(Victoria (state)) Victoria	Joubert Modified 42	12.80	Thorry Gunnersen; John Alexander	4:08:24:00
77	5356	Illusion	New South Wales	Davidson 34	10.30	Kim Jaggar; Travis Read	4:09:18:06
78	8824	Chancellor	New South Wales	Farr Beneteau 47.7	14.80	Edward Tooher	4:11:31:12
79	4924	She	New South Wales	Mull Olsen 40	12.23	Peter Rodgers	4:11:55:37
80	7551	Flying Fish Arctos	New South Wales	Radford McIntyre 55	15.36	Russell Bonner	4:15:18:19
81	SM377	Bacardi	(Victoria (state)) Victoria	Peterson 44	13.40	Martin Power	4:19:48:06
82	FRA8995	41 SUD	New Caledonia	Nivelt Archambault 40	12.00	Jean-Luc Esplaas	4:21:56:16
83	R166	Deja Vu	(Victoria (state)) Victoria	Dufour 38	11.60	Steven Carey	5:05:33:15
84	C444	Namadgi	Australian Capital Territory	Humphreys Elan 444	13.90	Paul Jones	5:09:57:33
DNF	A5	Audi Sunshine Coast	Queensland	Welbourn 50	15.20	Rodney Jones	Retired-Rig Damage
DNF	F255	Black Adder	Western Australia	Thomas Sigma 41	12.50	James Clayton	Retired-Time Constraints
DNF	MH85	Canute	New South Wales	Mills King 40	12.10	Peter Horn; Mitchell Miller	Retired-Rudder Bearing
DNF	HKG2238	Dodo	New South Wales	Andrews TP 52	15.85	Adrian Dunphy; Martin Hoogland	Retired-Mainsail Damage
DNF	GBR721X	Henri Lloyd	(United Kingdom) Great Britain	Castro Clipper 70	21.33	Eric Holden	Retired-Rudder Damage
DNF	8339	Luna Sea	New South Wales	Hick 35	10.50	James Cameron	Retired-Rudder Damage
DNF	360	Patrice	New South Wales	Ker 46	13.90	Tony Kirby	Retired-Minor Hull Damage
DNF	B45	Rush	(Victoria (state)) Victoria	Farr 45	13.81	John Paterson	Retired-Injured Crew Member
DNF	AUS11888	Wedgetail	Queensland	Reichel Pugh RP55	16.80	Bill Wild	Retired-Dismasted
DNF	7004	Wilparina	New South Wales	Sparkman & Stephens S&S 34	10.10	Nick Cannar	Retired-Crew Seasickness

Notes

^1 – Shining Sea were given a 20 minutes penalty to be added onto their elapsed time by the International Jury due to failing to maintain a continuous listening watch on the race radio frequencies for the duration of their race as required by Sailing Instruction 40.7 (Radio Transmissions).
^2 – Titania of Cowes were penalised 20% of their placing by the International Jury due to failing to lodge a declaration within six hours of their finish time as required by Sailing Instruction 27.1 (Declarations).
^3 – Mission Performance were given a 20 minutes penalty to be added onto their elapsed time by the International Jury due to failing to maintain a continuous listening watch on the race radio frequencies for the duration of their race as required by Sailing Instruction 40.7 (Radio Transmissions).

=== Overall Handicap ===
Pos	Division Number	Sail Number	Yacht	State/Country	Yacht Type	LOA (Metres)	Skipper	Elapsed time d:hh:mm:ss
1	0	AUS5299	Victoire	New South Wales	Farr Cookson 50	15.20	Darryl Hodgkinson	3:18:27:43
2	2	SM602	Veloce	(Victoria (state)) Victoria	Elliott 44CR	13.70	Phil Simpfendorfer	3:19:32:17
3	2	421	Celestial	New South Wales	Rogers 46	14.00	Sam Haynes	3:20:35:40
4	1	GER6700	Varuna	Germany	Ker 51	15.00	Jens Kellinghusen	3:21:13:04
5	2	R33	Chutzpah	(Victoria (state)) Victoria	Reichel Pugh Caprice 40	12.35	Bruce Taylor	3:22:30:35
6	2	RQ5050	Kerumba	Queensland	Kers 50 C/R	15.20	Tam Faragher	3:22:59:10
7	1	GBR8200R	Nikata	(United Kingdom) Great Britain	Frers Swan 82	24.80	Tom Brewer	4:01:26:13
8	1	AUS 01	Ichi Ban	New South Wales	Carkeek 60	19.50	Matt Allen	4:01:32:42
9	0	10007	Pretty Fly III	New South Wales	Farr Cookson 50	15.24	Colin Woods	4:02:04:36
10	4	4343	Wild Rose	New South Wales	Farr 43	13.11	Roger Hickman	4:02:41:55
11	3	9988	Brannew	New South Wales	Farr Beneteau First 40 CR	12.24	Chris Bran	4:02:53:02
12	3	G14	Senna	(Victoria (state)) Victoria	Briand Beneteau First 45	13.60	Chris Manton; Brendan Garner	4:04:37:34
13	2	RQ64	Ocean Affinity	Queensland	Reichel Pugh Marten 49	15.00	Stewart Lewis	4:05:11:52
14	1	S777	Primitive Cool	(Victoria (state)) Victoria	Reichel Pugh RP51	15.61	John Newbold	4:05:51:04
15	2	6837	Minerva	New South Wales	Reichel Pugh DK43	13.00	Timothy & William Cox	4:06:16:44
16	2	8338	Midnight Rambler	New South Wales	Ker 40	12.20	Bob Thomas; Ed Psaltis; Michael Bencsik	4:06:19:42
17	3	YC1545	Shining Sea	South Australia	Briand Beneteau First 45	13.60	Andrew Corletto	4:07:46:11
18	3	6841	Papillon	New South Wales	Joubert-Nivelt Archambault 40RC	12.00	Phil Molony	4:07:51:09
19	2	67	ColorTile	New South Wales	Sayer 44.9	13.70	Warren & Kristy Buchan	4:07:54:35
20	4	5356	Illusion	New South Wales	Davidson 34	10.30	Kim Jaggar; Travis Read	4:08:02:17
21	0	NZL70000	Giacomo	New Zealand	Juan-K Volvo Open 70	21.50	Jim Delegat	4:08:12:46
22	1	MLT10010	Zefiro	Cyprus	Farr 100	30.20	Gerhard Ruether	4:08:33:10
23	1	GBR5211L	Frantic	New South Wales	Donovan TP 52	15.85	Michael Martin	4:08:44:19
24	2	GBR6821R	Titania of Cowes	(United Kingdom) Great Britain	Frers Swan 68	21.60	Richard Dobbs	4:01:36:21 ^{1}
25	3	3838	Zen	New South Wales	Murray Burns Dovell Sydney 38	11.80	Gordon Ketelbey	4:09:11:14
26	4	7075	Martela	Tasmania	Jeppesen IMX 38	11.30	Anthony Williams	4:09:16:22
27	3	6834	Breakthrough	New South Wales	Farr Beneteau First 40	12.24	Jonathan Stone; Mathew Vadas	4:09:37:45
28	3	6755	Pennant Hills Ford	New South Wales	Farr Beneteau 47.7	14.00	Ian Creak	4:10:02:15
29	3	A140	Ariel	New South Wales	Farr Beneteau First 40	12.24	Ron Forster; Phil Damp	4:10:04:20
30	3	33345	Black Sheep	New South Wales	Briand Beneteau 45	13.70	Derek & Martin Sheppard	4:10:17:32
31	2	S390	Jazz Player-Think Pink Foundation	(Victoria (state)) Victoria	Bakewell-White 39	11.92	Andrew Lawrence	4:10:32:09
32	0	10001	Wild Oats XI	New South Wales	Reichel Pugh 100	30.48	Mark Richards	4:10:47:13
33	0	SYD 1000	Perpetual Loyal	New South Wales	Juan Yacht Design Juan-K 100	30.48	Anthony Bell	4:11:23:00
34	3	R75	Halcyon	(Victoria (state)) Victoria	Farr Beneteau First 40	12.24	Chris Tucker	4:11:31:45
35	3	SM381	Mille Sabords	(Victoria (state)) Victoria	Murray Burns Dovell Sydney 38	11.80	Stephane Howarth	4:11:32:54
36	0	52570	Black Jack	Queensland	Juan-K Volvo Open 70	21.50	Peter Harburg	4:11:37:25
37	3	7771	Balance	New South Wales	Briand Beneteau 45	13.68	Paul Clitheroe	4:11:45:01
38	3	5656	Mondo	Queensland	Murray Burns Dovell Sydney 38	11.80	Ray Sweeney	4:12:14:06
39	3	MH60	TSA Management	New South Wales	Murray Burns Dovell Sydney 38	11.80	Tony Levett	4:12:24:09
40	3	A169	Nautical Circle	New South Wales	Nivelt Archambault 40	12.00	Ian Prentice	4:12:42:56
41	4	11407	Shepherd Centre	New South Wales	Farr Beneteau First 40.7	11.92	Hugh Torode	4:13:14:18
42	4	SM117	Tilting at Windmills	(Victoria (state)) Victoria	Joubert Modified 42	12.80	Thorry Gunnersen; John Alexander	4:13:18:24
43	2	6686	St Jude	New South Wales	Murray Burns Dovell Sydney 47	14.20	Noel Cornish	4:13:29:57
44	4	6689	Copernicus	New South Wales	Radford 12	11.99	Greg Zyner	4:13:34:03
45	2	SIN4321	Zanzibar	Singapore	Humphreys 42	12.78	Jonathan Mahony	4:13:38:15
46	0	HKG 1997	Beau Geste	Hong Kong	Botin 80	24.40	Karl Kwok	4:14:45:11
47	0	M497	Venture 2	New South Wales	Elliott 50	15.20	Stephan Chapman	4:15:13:17
48	3	B331	Audacious	(Victoria (state)) Victoria	Murray Burns Dovell Sydney 38	11.80	Glen Clinnick	4:15:31:09
49	2	GBR9359T	CV10	(United Kingdom) Great Britain	Dubois Clipper 68	20.77	James Dobie	4:15:32:07
50	3	N40	One For The Road	New South Wales	Joubert Nivelt Archambault 40	12.00	Kym Butler	4:16:02:47
51	0	AUS03	Southern Excellence II	New South Wales	Jones 70	21.50	Andrew Wenham	4:17:16:10
52	0	SYD 100	Ragamuffin 100	New South Wales	Elliot 100 Maxi	30.48	Syd Fischer	4:17:46:41
53	0	AUS 10	Wild Thing	New South Wales	Jones-Barrett 100 Supermaxi	30.48	Grant Wharington	4:18:25:25
54	1	GBR730X	Derry-Londonderry-Doire	(United Kingdom) Great Britain	Castro Clipper 70	21.33	Sean McCarter	4:18:31:18
55	2	HY161	Knee Deep	Western Australia	Farr 49	16.54	Philip Childs	4:19:58:50
56	2	GBR9354T	CV5	(United Kingdom) Great Britain	Dubois Clipper 68	20.77	Piers Dudin	4:20:04:59
57	3	8824	Chancellor	New South Wales	Farr Beneteau 47.7	14.80	Edward Tooher	4:23:14:23
58	4	SM377	Bacardi	(Victoria (state)) Victoria	Peterson 44	13.40	Martin Power	4:23:30:26
59	1	GBR726X	GREAT Britain	(United Kingdom) Great Britain	Castro Clipper 70	21.33	Simon Talbot	4:23:42:00
60	1	GBR729X	Old Pulteney	(United Kingdom) Great Britain	Castro Clipper 70	21.33	Patrick Van Der Zijden	4:23:57:56
61	1	GBR720X	One DLL	(United Kingdom) Great Britain	Castro Clipper 70	21.33	Oliver Cotterell	5:00:08:35
62	1	GBR724X	Switzerland	(United Kingdom) Great Britain	Castro Clipper 70	21.33	Victoria Ellis	5:01:20:15
63	1	GBR728X	PSP Logistics	(United Kingdom) Great Britain	Castro Clipper 70	21.33	Christopher Hollis	5:03:19:34
64	1	GBR731X	Jamaica Get All Right	(United Kingdom) Great Britain	Castro Clipper 70	21.33	Peter Stirling	5:03:25:07
65	1	GBR722X	Qingdao	(United Kingdom) Great Britain	Castro Clipper 70	21.33	Gareth Glover	5:03:54:24
66	1	GBR723X	Mission Performance	(United Kingdom) Great Britain	Castro Clipper 70	21.33	Matthew Mitchell	5:05:58:58
67	1	GBR727X	Team Garmin	(United Kingdom) Great Britain	Castro Clipper 70	21.33	Mark Burkes	5:07:07:05
68	3	FRA8995	41 SUD	New Caledonia	Nivelt Archambault 40	12.00	Jean-Luc Esplaas	5:08:11:54
69	1	GBR725X	Invest Africa	(United Kingdom) Great Britain	Castro Clipper 70	21.33	Richard Gould	5:09:42:02
DNF	1	A5	Audi Sunshine Coast	Queensland	Welbourn 50	15.20	Rodney Jones	Retired-Rig Damage
DNF	3	MH85	Canute	New South Wales	Mills King 40	12.10	Peter Horn; Mitchell Miller	Retired-Rudder Bearing
DNF	1	GBR721X	Henri Lloyd	(United Kingdom) Great Britain	Castro Clipper 70	21.33	Eric Holden	Retired-Rudder Damage
DNF	4	8339	Luna Sea	New South Wales	Hick 35	10.50	James Cameron	Retired-Rudder Damage
DNF	1	360	Patrice	New South Wales	Ker 46	13.90	Tony Kirby	Retired-Minor Hull Damage
DNF	2	B45	Rush	(Victoria (state)) Victoria	Farr 45	13.81	John Paterson	Retired-Injured Crew Member
DNF	1	AUS11888	Wedgetail	Queensland	Reichel Pugh RP55	16.80	Bill Wild	Retired-Dismasted

Notes

^1 – Titania of Cowes were penalised 20% of their placing by the International Jury due to failing to lodge a declaration within six hours of their finish time as required by Sailing Instruction 27.1 (Declarations).
