= Mar Mostro =

Volvo Open 70 yacht

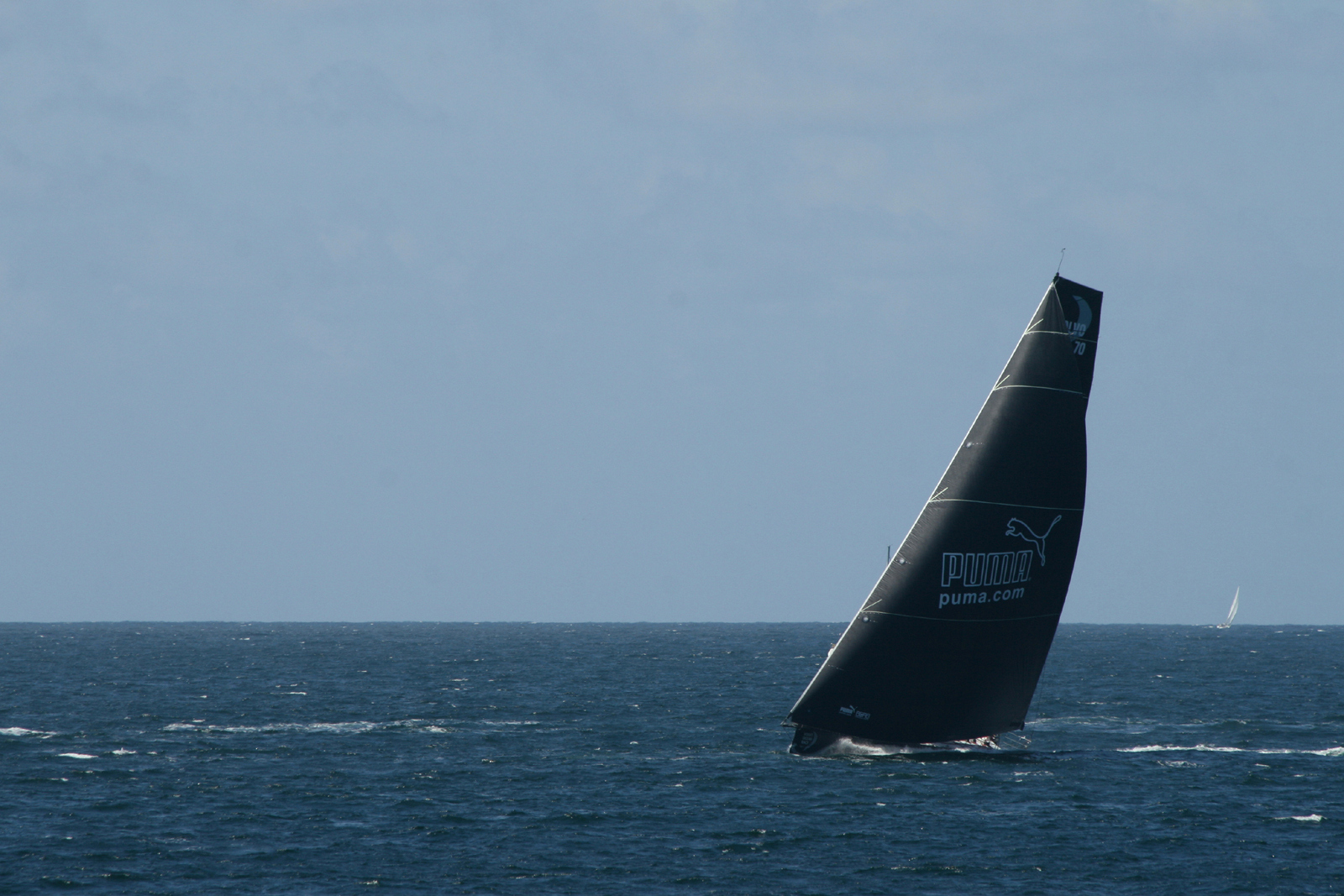
- Mar Mostro during the 2011–12 Volvo Ocean Race.
- Nation: United States
- Class: Volvo Open 70

Racing career
- Skippers: Ken Read

Mar Mostro is a Volvo Open 70 yacht. She finished third in the 2011–12 Volvo Ocean Race skippered by Ken Read.
