= Camper Lifelovers =

Racing yacht

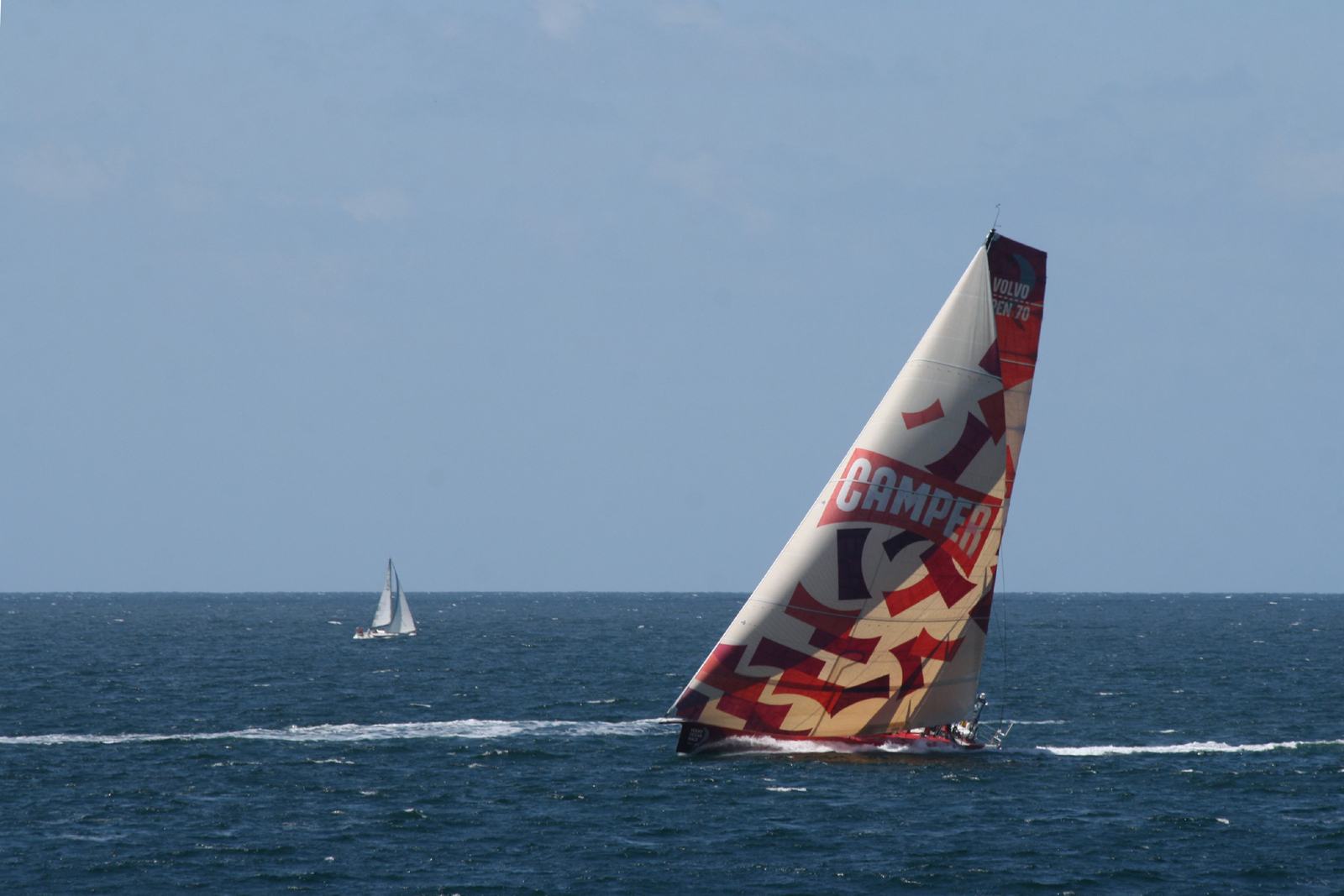
- Camper Lifelovers during the 2011–12 Volvo Ocean Race.
- Nation: New Zealand
- Class: Volvo Open 70
- Designer(s): Emirates Team New Zealand design team
- Builder: Cookson Boats, New Zealand

Racing career
- Skippers: Chris Nicholson

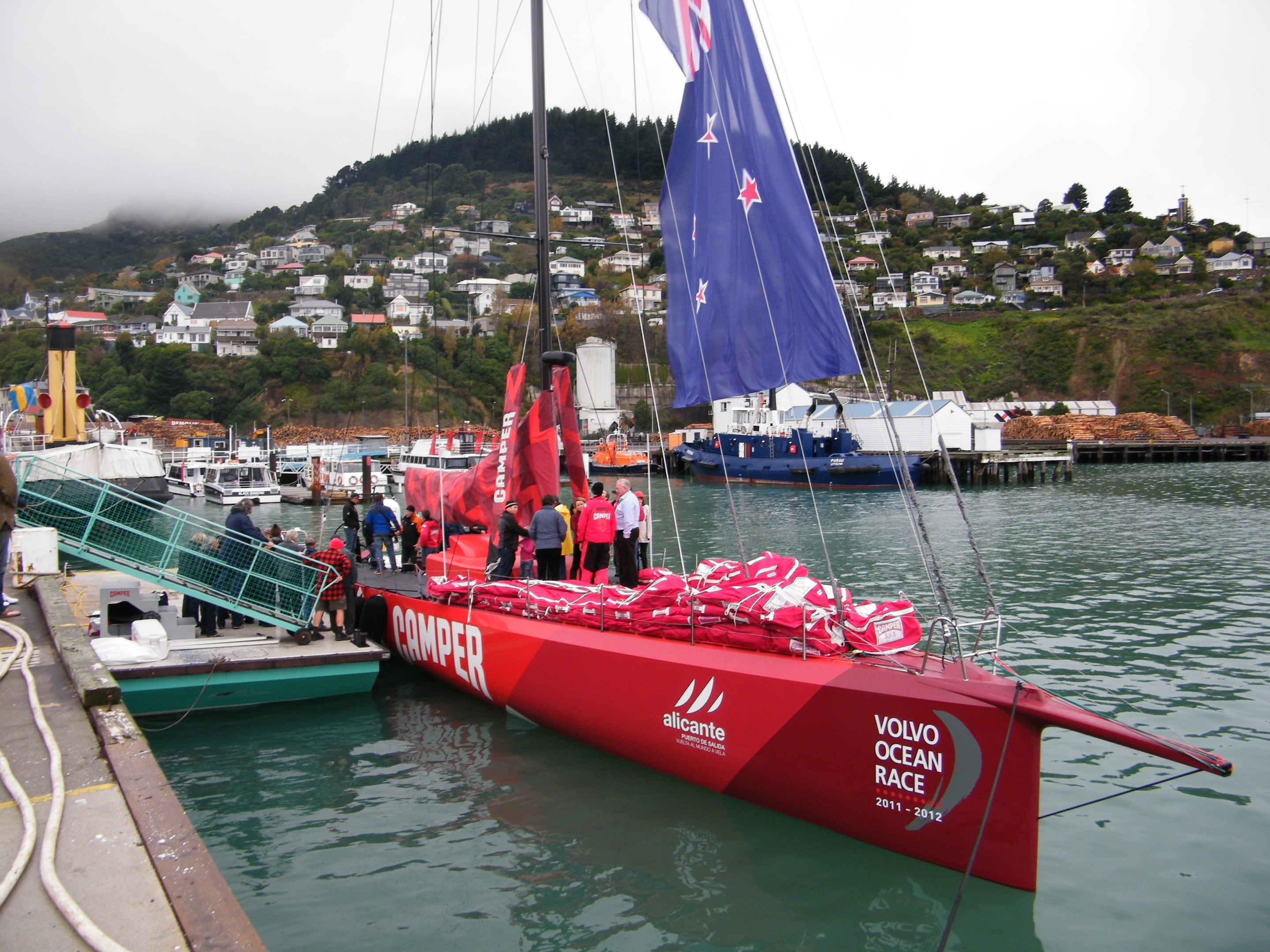
Camper Lifelovers in 2011.

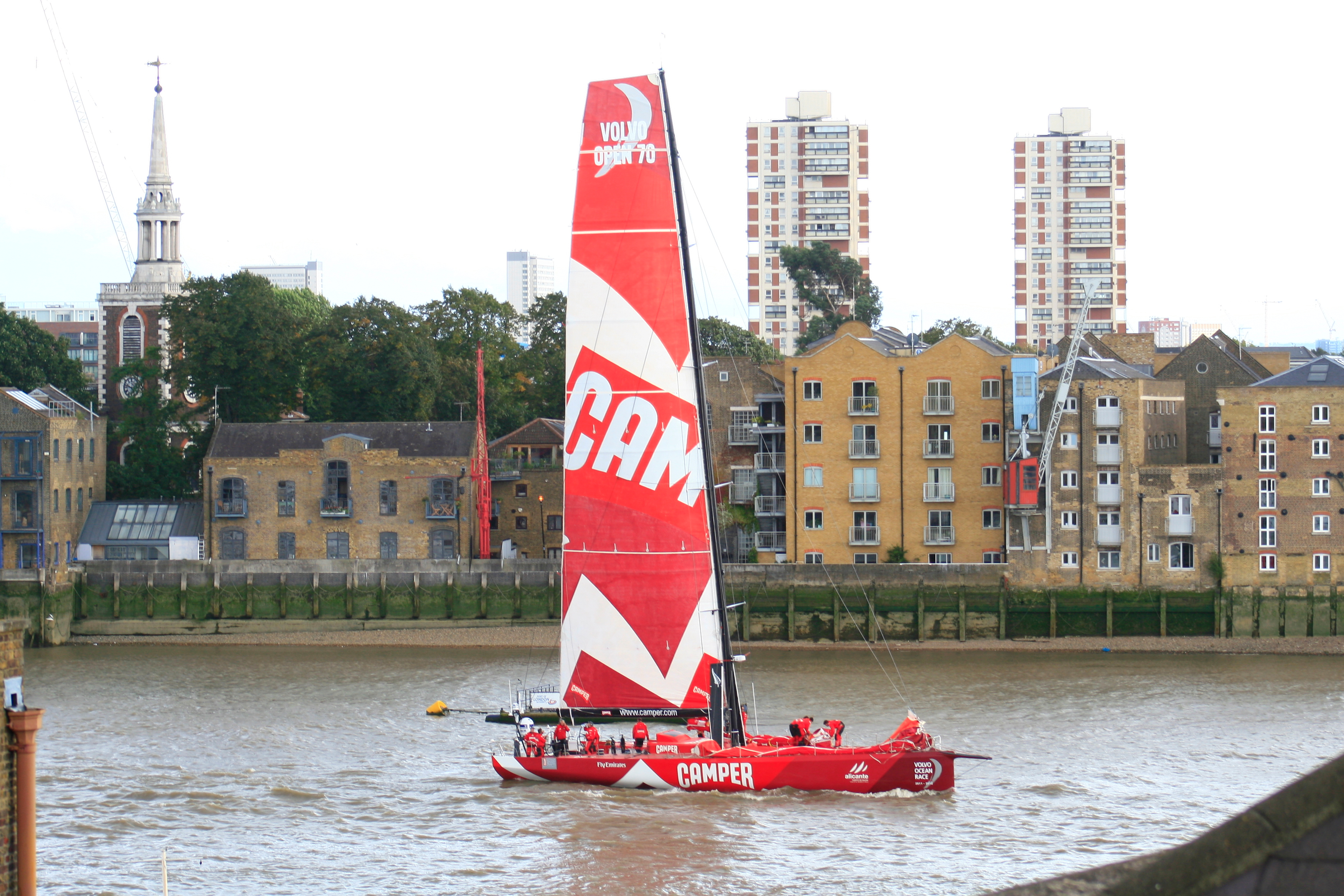
Camper Lifelovers in 2011.

Camper Lifelovers is a Volvo Open 70 yacht. She finished second in the 2011–12 Volvo Ocean Race skippered by Chris Nicholson.

== Career ==
The Emirates Team New Zealand design team joined with Camper sports company of Spain to develop and build Camper Lifelovers at Cookson Boats in New Zealand. The graphic elements of the boat was designed by Mark Farrow.

The yacht competed in the 2011–12 Volvo Ocean Race skippered by Australian Chris Nicholson, where she finished second after Groupama 4.
