= Telefónica (disambiguation) =

Telefónica most often refers to:

- Telefónica, a Spanish-multinational telecommunications company

Telefónica may also refer to:

== Buildings ==
- Distrito Telefónica, worldwide headquarters of Telefónica
- Telefónica Building, flagship store and former headquarters

== Businesses ==
- Telefónica Germany, German subdivision of Telefónica
- Telefônica Vivo, Brazilian subdivision of Telefónica
- Telefónica Europe, former European subdivision of Telefónica

== Sailing ==
- Telefónica Blue, an Ocean Race yacht
- Telefónica (yacht), an Ocean Race yacht
