= Azzam (2011 yacht) =

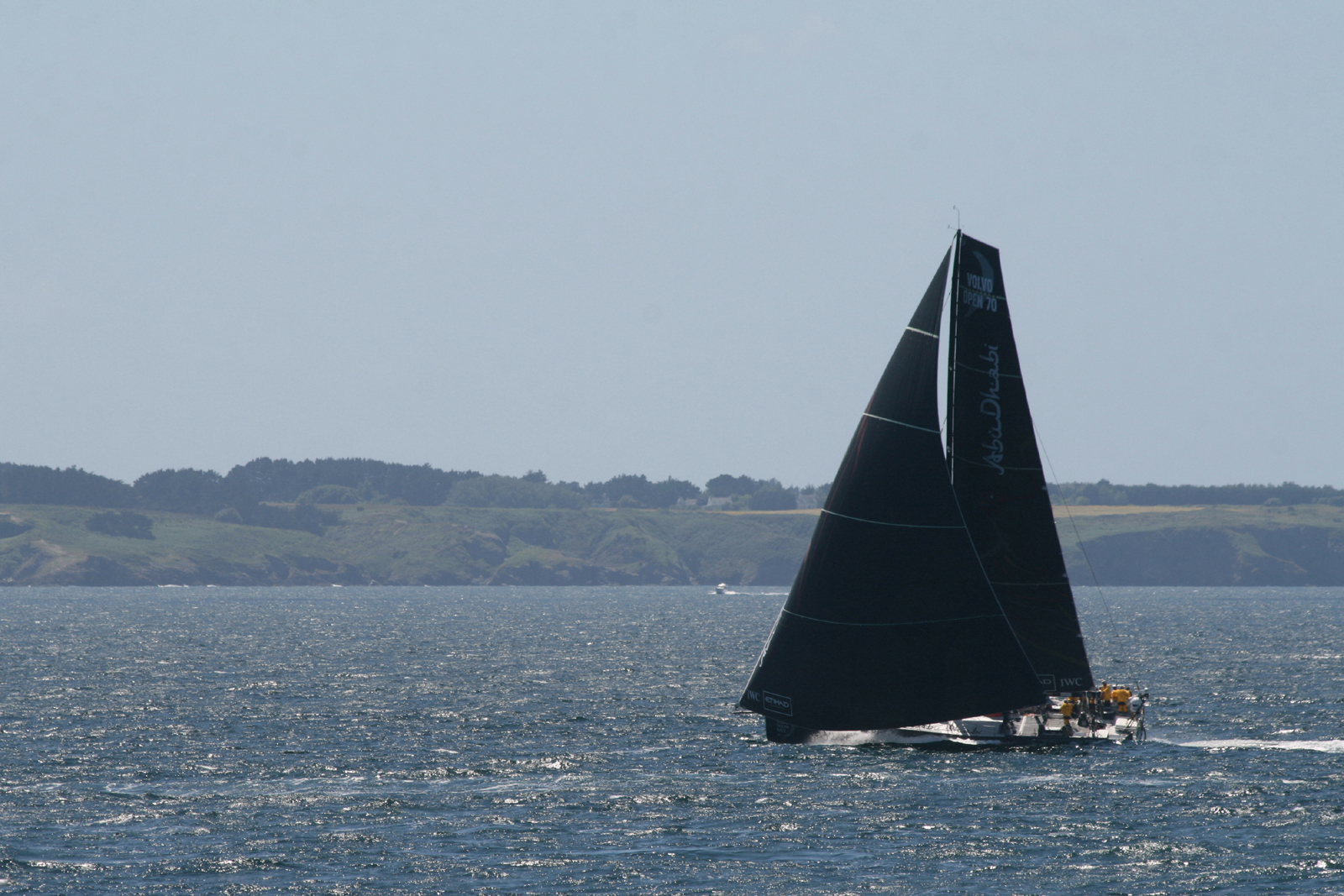
- Azzam during the 2011–12 Volvo Ocean Race.
- Nation: United Arab Emirates
- Class: Volvo Open 70

Racing career
- Skippers: Ian Walker

Azzam was a Volvo Open 70 yacht by Farr Yacht Design. Skippered by Ian Walker, she finished fifth in the 2011–12 Volvo Ocean Race.

On 16 January 2015 the yacht was completely destroyed by fire in France.

== See also ==
- Azzam (2014 yacht)
