= Chris Nicholson (sailor) =

Australian sailor

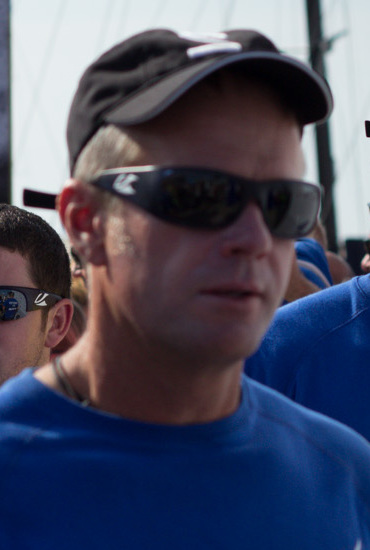
- Nicholson at the Volvo Ocean Race 2014

Personal information
- Full name: Christopher John Nicholson
- Born: 18 June 1969 (age 57) Newcastle, New South Wales

Sailing career
- Sport: Sailing

Christopher John Nicholson (born 18 June 1969) is an Australian sailor who has competed in multiple Summer Olympics and Volvo Ocean Races and has won six World championships.

== Sailing career ==
In 1992, Chris and his brother Darren won the 505 World Championships in Santa Cruz. The pair also won the 1994 World Championships in Durban and the 2002 World Championships in Fremantle.

Nicholson then started competing in the 49er class with Daniel Phillips. Nicholson and Phillips won the 1997 Kiel Week event and then won the 1997 49er World Championships in Perth. Nicholson defended the title twice, winning the 1998 event in Bandol together before Nicholson won the 1999 event in Melbourne with Ed Smyth. Nicholson and Phillips then won the 2000 European Championships.

Nicholson represented Australia at the 2000 Summer Olympics, sailing a 49er with Phillips and placing sixth in the competition. He then competed in his first Volvo Ocean Race, sailing in the 2001–02 event as a watch captain on Amer Sports One.

Nicholson again represented Australia at the 2004 Summer Olympics, sailing in the 49er class with Gary Boyd. They placed seventh in the event.

He then returned to the Volvo Ocean Race, sailing with Movistar in 2005–06 and then with Il Mostro in 2008–09.

In 2009, Nicholson returned to compete in the 505 World Championships, placing third with Casey Smith.

For the 2011–12 Volvo Ocean Race, Nicholson skippered Camper Lifelovers, placing second. He was the skipper of Team Vestas Wind, which was a late entry for the 2014–15 Volvo Ocean Race. On 30 November 2014, during a night navigation, Team Vestas Wind grounded on a coral atoll of St. Brandon. Team Vestas Wind was able to rejoin the race for the final two legs. He then competed in the 2016 Sydney to Hobart Yacht Race on Perpetual Loyal.

In 2017 he is a crew member of the Team AkzoNobel in 2017–18 Volvo Ocean Race starting from the leg 2.
