= 2011–2012 Volvo Ocean Race =

2011–12 Volvo Ocean Race

Event title
- Edition: 11th
- Dates: 29 October 2011 – 7 July 2012
- Yachts: Volvo Open 70

Competitors
- Competitors: 6

Results
- Winner: Groupama

The 2011–12 Volvo Ocean Race was the 11th edition of the round-the-world Volvo Ocean Race, yacht race which started with an in-port race in Alicante, Spain on 29 October 2011 with six Volvo Open 70 yachts at the start line and ended with an in-port race in Galway, Ireland on 7 July 2012. The 39,270 NM route involved stopovers and in-port races in Cape Town, Abu Dhabi, Sanya, Auckland, Itajaí, Miami, Lisbon, Lorient, and finally Galway. The race consisted of nine ocean races and ten in-port races.

== Participants ==
Six teams started and finished the race. Of the teams only Team Sanya raced a second-hand boat, Telefónica Blue, which had taken third place in the 2008-09 race.

Team & Boat name	Flag & Sail	Design Firm	Builder	Skipper	Boat
Puma Ocean Racing powered by Berg Propulsion; Mar Mostro	(United States) USA15	Juan Kouyoumdjian	New England Boatworks	Ken Read	
Camper with Emirates Team New Zealand; Camper Lifelovers	(New Zealand)	Botin Partners	Cookson Boatbuilders	Chris Nicholson	
Team Telefónica; Telefónica	(Spain) ESP1	Juan Kouyoumdjian	King Marine	Iker Martinez	
Groupama Sailing Team; Groupama 4	(France) FRA17	Juan Kouyoumdjian	Multiplast	Franck Cammas	
Abu Dhabi Ocean Racing; Azzam	(United Arab Emirates) UAE1	Farr Yacht Design	Persico Marine	Ian Walker	
Team Sanya; Sanya Lan (formerly Telefónica Blue)	(China) CHN99	Farr Yacht Design	King Marine	Mike Sanderson	

=== Team Telefónica ===
- Team Telefónica announced their participation in the Volvo Ocean Race 2011-12 on 12 April 2011. The company will sponsor Pedro Campos’ team for the third consecutive time. The team could not use the former Telefónica boats as training boats, because the deadline for using second generation boats as training boats ended in March 2011. Their new boat was built at the King Marine shipyard in Valencia, Spain and is skippered by Iker Martinez.

=== Groupama ===
- Groupama was a French team skippered by Franck Cammas. The team acquired Ericsson 4, the second generation Volvo Open 70 that won the 2008-09 event, for training purposes. Their new boat Groupama 4 was built at the Multiplast shipyard in Vannes, France.

=== Team Abu Dhabi ===
- Team Abu Dhabi acquired Puma Avanti (formerly ABN Amro Two, a first generation Volvo Open 70) as a training boat was led by Ian Walker. Their new boat Azzam was built at the Persico Marine shipyard in Bergamo, Italy.

=== Puma Ocean Racing powered by Berg Propulsion ===
- Puma Ocean Racing, powered by BERG Propulsion was skippered again by Ken Read. Their training boat, Il Mostro is Puma's boat from the 2008-2009 race, which placed second in that event. Their new boat Mar Mostro was built by New England Boatworks in Newport, Rhode Island.

=== Camper with Emirates Team New Zealand ===
- Camper with Emirates Team New Zealand was skippered by Chris Nicholson with a new Volvo Open 70 boat that was built by Cookson Boatbuilders in Auckland, New Zealand.

=== Team Sanya ===
- Team Sanya was skippered by Mike Sanderson (skipper of ABN Amro One, 2005-06 event winner). This team announced their entry on 17 June 2011 and are racing in the refitted second generation boat Sanya Lan (formerly Telefonica Blue).

== Route ==
the 39,270 nautical mile- 9 leg- race around the world

The race used a scoring system where the overall winner was the team with the most points at the end of the race. All races counted with no discards allowed. The boats were awarded points in every race, six to one in in-port races and 30 to 5 points (30, 25, 20, 15, 10 and 5) for ocean races (legs). The race had a total of nine ocean legs and ten in-port races. Due to piracy the legs to and from Abu Dhabi were given two scores with the same total as the other legs. The scores were to be divided 80+20% and 20+80% respectively.

In addition to the ocean and in-port races, there were no-score pro-am races in every port where sponsors and guests were given an experience as close to that of true professional sailing as possible.

=== Summary ===
The race began in Alicante on 29 October 2011 and ended in Galway on 7 July 2012.

Event	Start Date	Finish Date	Start	Finish	Distance	Points					
Event	Start Date	Finish Date	Start	Finish	Distance	Abu Dhabi	Camper	Groupama	Puma	Sanya	Telefónica
In-Port Race	29 October 2011		(Spain) Alicante			6	4	2	5	3	1
Leg 1	5 November 2011	25 November 2011	(Spain) Alicante	(South Africa) Cape Town	6,500nmi	0 (DNF)	25	20	0 (DNF)	0 (DNF)	30
In-Port Race	10 December 2011		(South Africa) Cape Town			3	5	2	4	1	6
Leg 2	11 December 2011	4 January 2012	(South Africa) Cape Town	(Maldives) Malé	5,430nmi	8	20	12	16	4	24
Leg 2	11 December 2011	4 January 2012	(United Arab Emirates) Sharjah	(United Arab Emirates) Abu Dhabi	5,430nmi	2	4	6	3	1	5
In-Port Race	13 January 2012		(United Arab Emirates) Abu Dhabi			6	4	5	3	2	2
Leg 3	14 January 2012	4 February 2012	(United Arab Emirates) Abu Dhabi	(United Arab Emirates) Sharjah	106nmi	6	2	4	5	1	3
Leg 3	14 January 2012	4 February 2012	(Maldives) Malé	(China) Sanya	3,051nmi	8	16	20	12	4	24
In-Port Race	18 February 2012		(China) Sanya			4	3	2	5	1	6
Leg 4	19 February 2012	8 March 2012	(China) Sanya	(New Zealand) Auckland	5,220nmi	10	15	30	25	5	20
In-Port Race	17 March 2012		(New Zealand) Auckland			2	6	4	5	3	1
Leg 5	18 March 2012	4 April 2012	(New Zealand) Auckland	(Brazil) Itajaí	6,705nmi	0 (DNF)	15	20	30	0 (DNF)	25
In-Port Race	21 April 2012		(Brazil) Itajaí			3	5	6	4	0 (DNS)	2
Leg 6	22 April 2012	6 May 2012	(Brazil) Itajaí	(United States) Miami	4,800nmi	10	25	20	30	0 (DNS)	15
In-Port Race	19 May 2012		(United States) Miami			6	3	5	4	2	1
Leg 7	20 May 2012	31 May 2012	(United States) Miami	(Portugal) Lisbon	3,590nmi	30	10	25	20	5	15
In-Port Race	9 June 2012		(Portugal) Lisbon			3	4	6	5	2	1
Leg 8	10 June 2012	17 June 2012	(Portugal) Lisbon	(France) Lorient	1,940nmi	15	25	30	20	5	10
In-Port Race	30 June 2012		(France) Lorient			2	5	6	4	1	3
Leg 9	1 July 2012	3 July 2012	(France) Lorient	(Republic of Ireland) Galway	485nmi	5	30	25	20	10	15
In-Port Race	7 July 2012		(Republic of Ireland) Galway			2	5	3	6	1	4
In-port Race Series						37	44	41	45	16	27
Total score						131	231	253	226	51	213

=== Alicante In-Port Race ===
On 29 October 2011 Abu Dhabi won the first In-Port race with Puma second and Camper third. The winds were very light on the race day.

=== Alicante to Cape Town ===
The 6,500 NM leg started 5 November 2011 at 1300 UTC.

Camper with Emirates Team New Zealand led the fleet out of Alicante and through the Gibraltar straits.

On 5 November 2011, Abu Dhabi Ocean Racing lost its mast within hours of the race's beginning during heavy winds and high seas near Alicante. On 6 November 2011 Team Sanya was forced to head to port after damaging its hull. Team Sanya withdrew from the first leg on 7 November after an assessment of the damage.

The fleet were led round the turning mark near the archipelago of Fernando de Noronha by Puma Ocean Racing, powered by BERG Propulsion on 17 November. Several days later at 1500 hours on 21 November their mast failed, splitting into three bits. They retired from the first leg on 22 November and headed to Tristan da Cunha.

Telefónica won the first leg, followed by Camper with Emirates Team New Zealand. Groupama placed third, several days after the leaders, as they missed the lowpressure system Telefónica and Camper used to cross the southern Atlantic at high speed.

=== Cape Town In-Port Race ===
On 10 December 2011 Telefónica won the In-Port race with Camper second and Puma third.

=== Cape Town to Abu Dhabi ===
The 5,430 NM leg started on 11 December 2011. Abu Dhabi Ocean Racing led the fleet out of Cape Town. Team Sanya were forced to suspend racing following a rigging failure and missed the cargo ship from the secret port to Abu Dhabi.

Due to the threat of piracy around Somalia, the fleet headed from Cape Town to a secret port, later revealed to be Malé, and were then transported by ship to Abu Dhabi, closer to the finish line for a sprint into Abu Dhabi. The first part of the leg gave 80% of the points (24, 20, 16, 12, 8 and 4 points) and the second part 20% (6, 5, 4, 3, 2 and 1 points) for the same total of 30 to 5 points as the other ocean legs. Team Telefónica were the first boat into the secret port while Groupama Sailing Team won the sprint leg. Telefónica won overall points on the leg.

Team Sanya resumed racing on 6 January with a six-man crew and finally finished the first part of leg 2 on 19 January, also scoring points for the sprint part of leg 2 and the in port race that they had missed.

=== Abu Dhabi In-Port Race ===
Was held on 13 January 2012 and was won by Abu Dhabi Ocean Racing, with Groupama coming second, and Camper third.

=== Abu Dhabi to Sanya ===
The 4,600 NM leg started on 14 January 2012. Due to the threat of piracy around Somalia, the fleet was transported once again by ship to Male from where the third leg of the race began. From the new port they will then head through the Bay of Bengal and then pass the Malacca Strait. The first part give 20% of the points (6, 5, 4, 3, 2 and 1 points) and the second part 80% (24, 20, 16, 12, 8 and 4 points) for the same total of 30 to 5 points as the other ocean legs.

=== Sanya In-Port Race ===
On 18 February 2012 Team Telefónica took their second in-port victory in perfect sailing conditions with flat waters and winds gusting up to 20 knots. Team Puma came in second, followed by Abu Dhabi, Camper, Groupama and Sanya.

=== Sanya to Auckland ===
The 5,220 NM leg started on 19 February 2012.

=== Auckland In-Port Race ===
Held on 17 March 2012 and won by Camper.

=== Auckland to Itajaí ===
The 6,705 NM leg started 18 March 2012. This leg, the longest in the race, included safety waypoints which were designed to keep the boats north of the main areas of iceberg risk.

Team Sanya suffered rudder and hull damage on 22 March and were forced to return to New Zealand. They rejoined the race in Miami. Both Team New Zealand and Abu Dhabi stopped in Puerto Montt, Chile. Team New Zealand repaired the boat and continued on while Abu Dhabi was shipped from there to Itajai, Brazil.

After 17 days at sea, with 677 nautical miles to go to the finish line, Groupama (Franck Cammas/FRA) dismasted 60 nautical miles (nm) south of Punta del Este. Groupama motored to Punta del Este and following the creation of a jury rig rejoined the race and was placed third.

=== Itajaí In-Port Race ===
Was held on 21 April 2012 and won by Groupama.

=== Itajaí to Miami ===
The 4,800 NM leg started on 22 April 2012 and was won by Puma.

=== Miami In-Port Race ===
Was held on 19 May 2012 and won by Abu Dhabi.

=== Miami to Lisbon ===
The 3,590 NM leg started on 20 May 2012.

=== Lisbon In-Port Race ===
Was held on 9 June 2012.

=== Lisbon to Lorient ===
The 1,940 NM leg started on 10 June 2012. From Lisbon the fleet travelled to a turning point at São Miguel Island before heading to Lorient.

=== Lorient In-Port Race ===
Was held 30 June 2012.

=== Lorient to Galway ===
The 485 NM leg started on 1 July 2012. This leg was the shortest offshore leg in the race.

=== Galway In-Port Race ===
Was held on 7 July 2012.

== Overall Results ==
Pos	Sail Number	Yacht	Country	Yacht Type	LOA (Metres)	Skipper	Points
1	FRA 17	Groupama 4	France	Juan-K Volvo Open 70	21.49	Franck Cammas	253
2	NZL 70	Camper with Emirates Team New Zealand	New Zealand	Botin Volvo Open 70	21.49	Chris Nicholson	231
3	USA 15	PUMA Ocean Racing by BERG-Mar Mostro	United States	Juan-K Volvo Open 70	21.49	Ken Read	226
4	ESP 1	Telefónica	Spain	Juan-K Volvo Open 70	21.49	Iker Martínez	213
5	UAE 1	Abu Dhabi Ocean Racing-Azzam	United Arab Emirates	Farr Volvo Open 70	21.49	Ian Walker	131
6	CHN 99	Sanya Lan	China	Farr Volvo Open 70	21.49	Mike Sanderson	51
