= Telefónica Blue =

Volvo Open 70 yacht

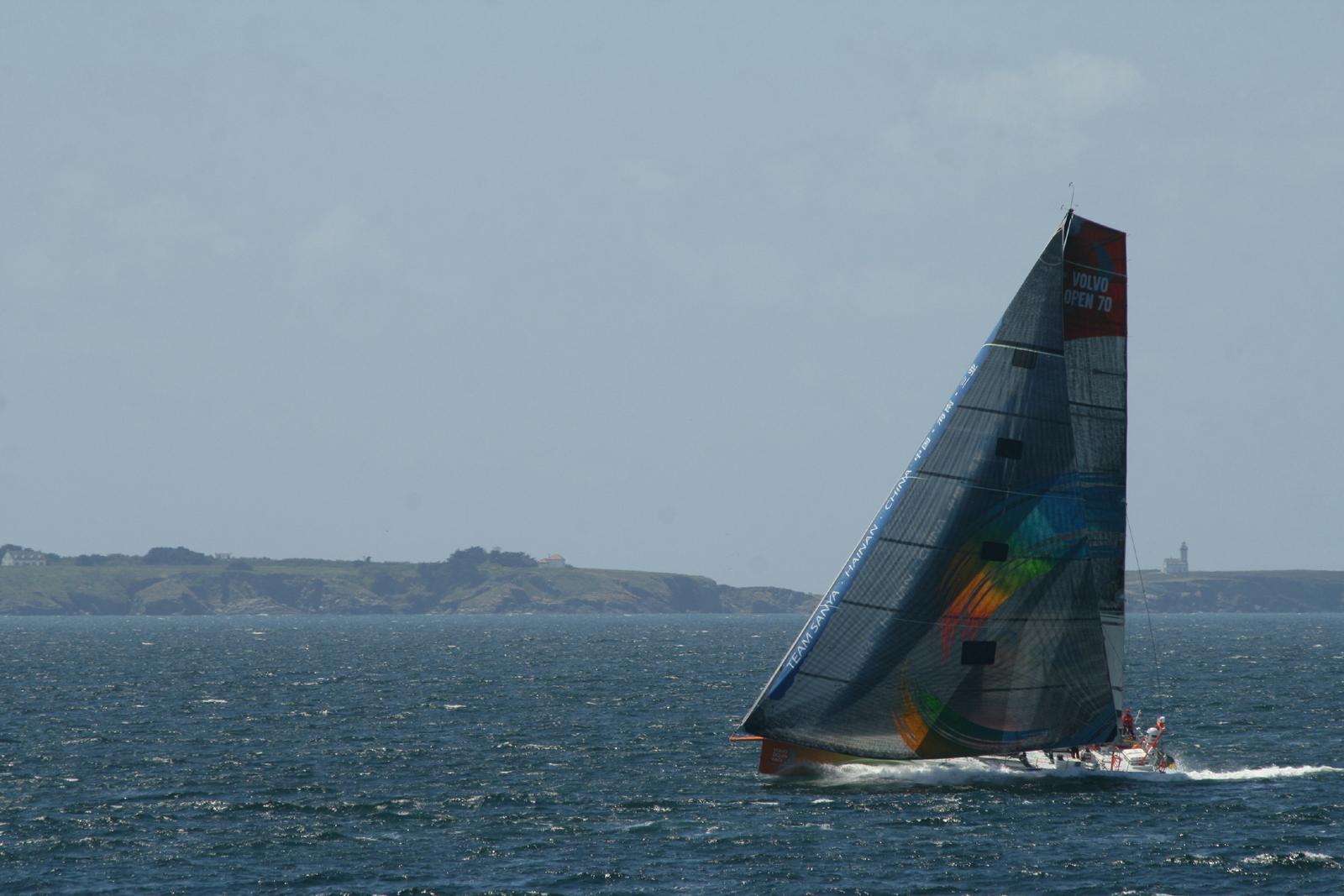
- Sanya Lan during the 2011–12 Volvo Ocean Race.
- Other names: Sanya Lan
- Nation: Spain; China
- Class: Volvo Open 70

Racing career
- Skippers: Bouwe Bekking; Mike Sanderson

Telefónica Blue (also Sanya Lan, now Ocean Breeze) is a Volvo Open 70 yacht.

== Career ==
She finished third in the 2008–09 Volvo Ocean Race skippered by Bouwe Bekking.

She finished sixth in the 2011–12 Volvo Ocean Race skippered by Mike Sanderson.
