= Berg Propulsion =

- Industry: Manufacturing & Service
- Founded: 1912
- Headquarters: Hönö, Gothenburg, Sweden
- Products: Marine Propulsion Systems
- Number of employees: 200+ (2020)
- Website: www.bergpropulsion.com

Berg Propulsion is a Swedish company that designs and manufactures controllable-pitch propellers for the marine industry. The company produces customized main propellers, azimuth thrusters, transverse thrusters and manoeuvre systems.

Berg Propulsion has production facilities in Sweden, and sales & service offices in Shanghai, Guangzhou, Dubai, Singapore, and Sweden.

Caterpillar Inc. bought Berg Propulsion, in 2013.

Caterpillar Inc. sold Caterpillar Propulsion group back to Berg Propulsion, on 30 June 2020.

== Involvement ==
Berg Propulsion was a title sponsor of the Puma Ocean Racing, powered by Berg Propulsion racing team for the 2011–12 Volvo Ocean Race.

Berg Propulsion is a corporate partner of the Royal Institution of Naval Architects.
