= Ken Read (sailor) =

American yachtsman (born 1961)

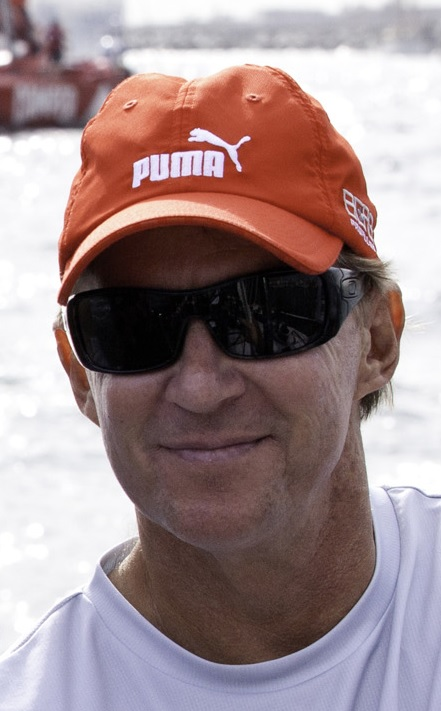
- Read in October 2011

Personal information
- Full name: Kenneth Wheaton Read II
- Born: June 24, 1961 (age 65) Providence, Rhode Island, U.S.
- Height: 6’ 1”
- Weight: 195 lb (88 kg)

Sailing career
- Sport: Sailing
- College team: Boston University
- Club: Barrington Yacht Club New York Yacht Club, Ida Lewis Yacht Club, Sail Newport, Fifth Ward Cruising Club

Kenneth Wheaton Read II (born June 24, 1961) is an American yachtsman who is considered one of the world's most accomplished and celebrated sailors. He was named United States Rolex Yachtsman of the Year twice (1985 and 1995), and has won more than 50 world, North American, and national championships in a variety of classes, with eleven of those being World Championships titles in the J/24, Etchells 22 and yacht classes.

== College ==
While sailing at Boston University (Boston, MA. USA), Read was a three-time collegiate All American (1981, 1982 and 1983) and is now a member of the Boston University Hall of Fame. He won the 1982 ICSA Coed Dinghy National Championship and the ICSA Match Racing National Championship, receiving the "Everett B. Morris Trophy", awarded to the ICSA College Sailor of the Year.

== America's Cup ==
Read was helmsman aboard two (2000, 2003) of Dennis Conner's Stars & Stripes America's Cup campaigns. He also served as strategist and coach with America's Cup entry Young America in 1995.

For the 2013, 2017 and 2021 America's Cup Read has served as global TV broadcast color commentator and is considered one of the best spokesmen for the sport of sailing in the world.

== Volvo Ocean Race ==
Read first began racing offshore when he joined the Ericsson Racing Team for the last four legs of the 2005–2006 Volvo Ocean Race.

Read was skipper and CEO of Puma Ocean Racing Team's il Mostro in the 2008–2009 Volvo Ocean Race—his first complete circumnavigation. Read took a sabbatical from his job as vice president of sailmaking company North Sails to skipper PUMA Ocean Racing's entry in the race. PUMA's il mostro finished 2nd Overall.

On October 29, 2011, Read returned as skipper for a second time to lead PUMA Ocean Racing powered by Berg's entry Mar Mostro in the 2011–2012 Volvo Ocean Race.

In July 2012, Mar Mostro finished its circumnavigation in Galway, Ireland in third place, securing a third place overall victory in the 2011–12 edition of the Volvo Ocean Race. Alongside a third place podium finish, Read led PUMA Ocean Racing powered by BERG to a first place overall victory in the In-Port Series. Read stated the 2011–12 Volvo Ocean Race would be his last.

== General Sailing ==
His career started in sail making where his multiple wins of the J/24 World Championship led directly to success in the sail making.

Since completing his Volvo Ocean Race campaigns, Read has often acted as skipper for Dr. James H. Clark's latest yachts Hanuman and IRC supermaxi Comanche. In 2015, Read skippered Comanche to Victory in the 2015 Sydney to Hobart Yacht Race.

== Other ==
Read worked in management at North Sails since 1996 and has taken four sabbaticals to take part in global yacht racing events. In 2012 he took over as president of North Sails. and in 2021 Read was also named as President of North Technology Group, a group of marine companies which includes North Sails, Southern Spars, Future Fibres, Hall Spars, North Action Sports, and North Performance Apparel.
