= Groupama 4 =

VO70 Groupama 4
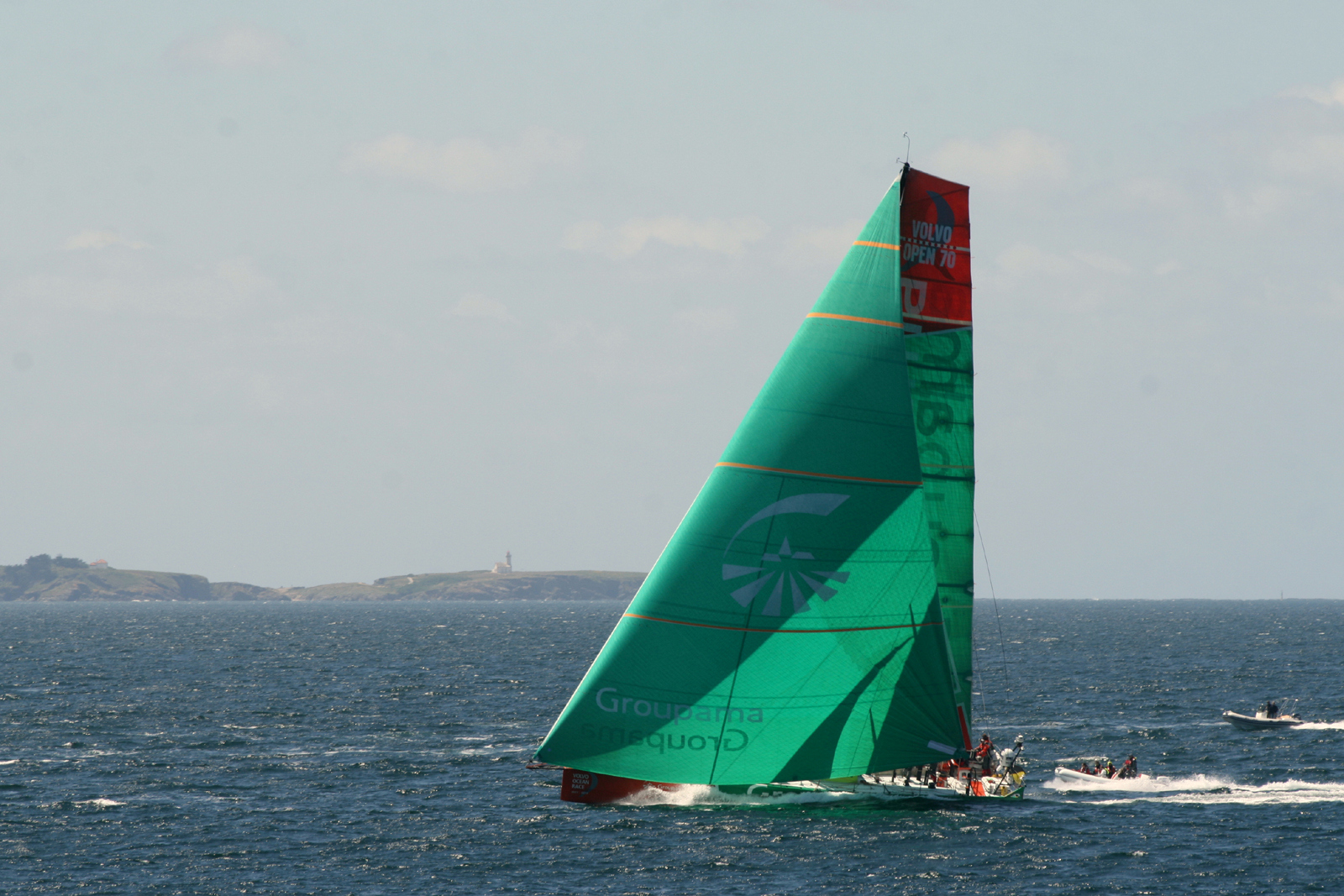
- Groupama 4 in 2012.
- Other names: Giacomo; Wizard
- Nation: France
- Class: Volvo Open 70
- Designer(s): Juan Kouyoumdjian
- Builder: Multiplast; Vannes, France
- Launched: 14 May 2011
- Owner(s): Groupama Sailing Team

Racing career
- Skippers: Franck Cammas
- Notable victories: 2011–12 Volvo Ocean Race 2016 Sydney to Hobart Yacht Race

Specifications
- Displacement: 14,000 kg (31,000 lb)
- Length: 21.50 m (70.5 ft) (LOA)
- Beam: 5.70 m (18.7 ft)
- Draft: 4.50 m (14.8 ft)
- Mast height: 31.50 m (103.3 ft)
- Crew: 11

Groupama 4 (also Giacomo and Wizard) is a Volvo Open 70 yacht designed by Juan Kouyoumdjian. She won the 2011–12 Volvo Ocean Race skippered by Franck Cammas.

== Career ==
=== Groupama 4 ===
Groupama 4 was launched on 14 May 2011.

=== Giacomo ===
Renamed to Giacomo, it won the 2016 Sydney to Hobart Yacht Race. It has since been sold to David and Peter Askew and renamed Wizard. In 2019, the American Volvo 70 Wizard won RORC Caribbean 600 Trophy, scoring the best corrected time under IRC. Wizard put in a near faultless performance to complete the 600-mile non-stop race in 43 hours 38 minutes and 44 seconds.

=== Wizard ===
Wizard is also the overall IRC winner of the 2019 Rolex Fastnet Race.

=== Tschuss 2 ===
Renamed 'Tschuss 2' in 2023. Winner of the RORC St Malo Race, The Round the Island Race 2023. 2024 Season - Gotland Runt Overall Win, RORC Baltic 600 overall win. 2025 Season - RORC Transatlantic Race Overall win, RORC Caribbean 600 Overall win, NYYC Transatlantic race Overall win, Rolex Fasnet race Class win in IRC Super zero

=== Pace ===
Renamed Pace In 2026 - Won the RORC Round Britain and Ireland Race Overall
