= Telefónica (yacht) =

Volvo Open 70 yacht

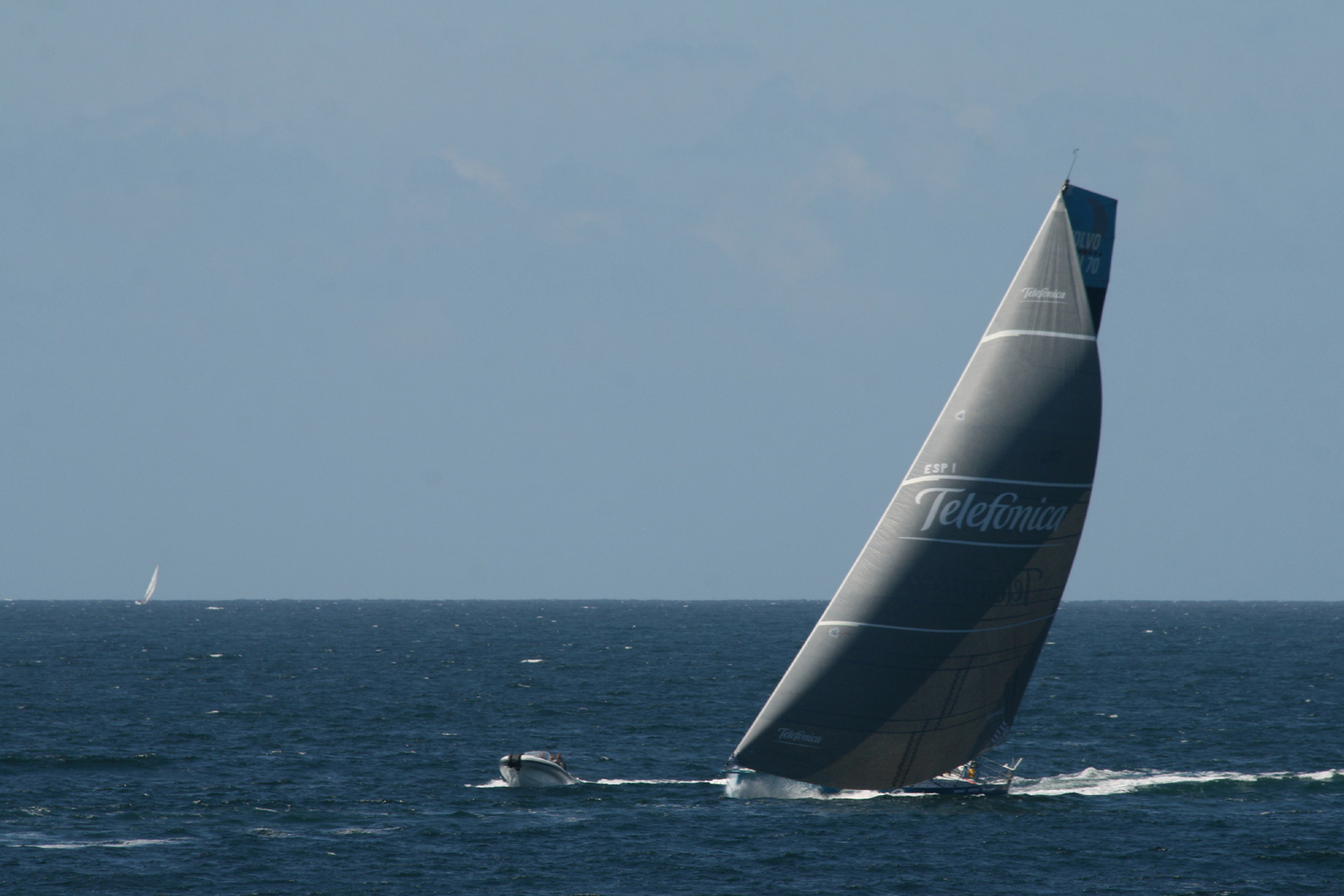
- Telefónica during the 2011–12 Volvo Ocean Race.
- Other names: Black Jack "Kraken"
- Nation: Spain
- Class: Volvo Open 70

Racing career
- Skippers: Iker Martínez Lance Shepherd

Telefónica (also Black Jack) is a Volvo Open 70 yacht. She finished fourth in the 2011–12 Volvo Ocean Race skippered by Iker Martínez.
