= Volvo Open 70 =

Class of racing yachts designed for the Volvo Ocean Race

- Class symbol

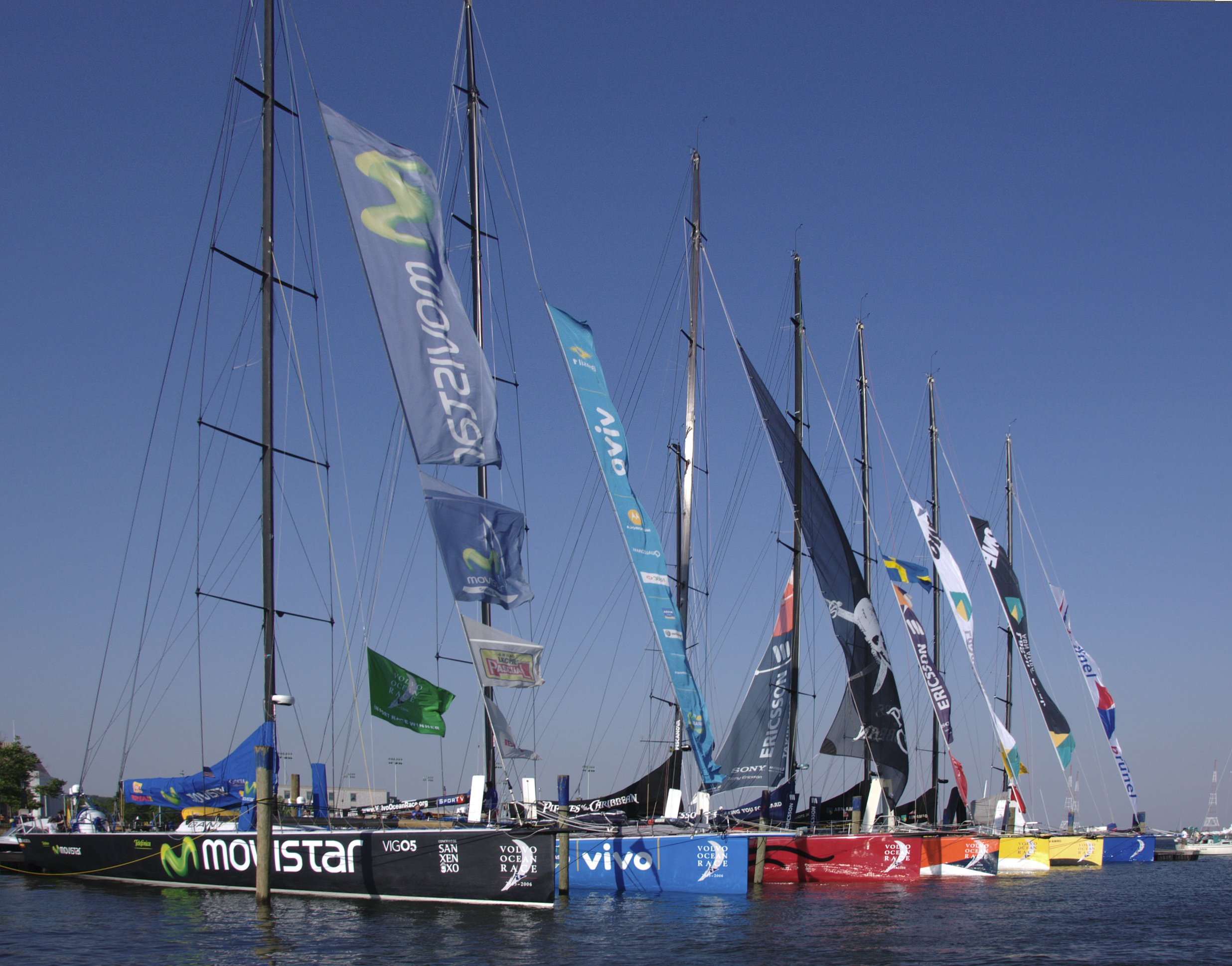
- Competitors of the 2005–2006 Volvo Ocean Race

Development
- Design: Development class

Boat
- Draft: 4.5 m (15 ft)

Hull
- LOA: 21.5 m (71 ft)
- Beam: 5.7 m (19 ft)

Rig
- Mast height: 31.5 m (103 ft)

Sails
- Mainsail area: 175 m^{2} (1,880 sq ft)
- Jib/genoa area: 94 m^{2} (1,010 sq ft)

The Volvo Open 70 (sometimes referred to as a Volvo Ocean 70) is the former class of racing yachts designed for the Volvo Ocean Race. It was first used in the 2005–06 race (replacing the Volvo Ocean 60 yachts which were first used in 1993).

According to the VO70 rule, the yachts can be made from glass fibres, aramid fibres, or carbon fibres (which were not allowed for VO60s). It uses a canting keel which is capable of canting transversely up to an angle of 40 degrees.

The Volvo Open 70 is not a singular yacht design or boat but rather a set of design rules to which competing boats must adhere. This is similar to the concept to the design and construction rules that define a racing car. Competing teams design and build boats within the scope of this rule to try to come up with the fastest boat for the expected conditions of the race.

Version 2 of the VO70 rule which “has been further developed to apply the lessons learned on the last event and ensure the continuing evolution of this outstanding class” was released in September 2006. A revised VO70 rule, version 3, was released in 2011.

The boat proved expensive and fragile, with numerous structural failures during races. On June 28, 2012, during a stopover in Lorient, France during the 2011–2012 Volvo Ocean Race, it was announced the boat would be replaced by the Volvo Ocean 65 for future editions of the race .

== Measurements ==
Attribute	Metric	Imperial
Length Overall	21.5 m	70.5 ft
Beam	5.7 m	18.7 ft
Draft	4.5 m	14.8 ft
Mast	31.5 m	103.3 ft
Displacement	14,000 kg	30,870 lb
Depth (canting keel)	4.5 m	14.8 ft
Ballast	7,400 kg	16,320 lb
Mainsail	175 m^{2}	1,883 sq'
Storm Jib	35 m^{2}	376 sq'
Jib	94 m^{2}	1,011 sq'
Spinnaker (Masthead)	500 m^{2}	5,381 sq'
Spinnaker (Fractional Rig)	350 m^{2}	3,767 sq'
Storm Trysail	41 m^{2}	441 sq'

== Records ==
In 2010 the VO70 Delta Lloyd (former ABN Amro I) established a new English Channel record with skipper Bouwe Bekking. In 2010 the VO70 Groupama 70 (former Ericsson 4) broke the record for the Round Britain and Ireland Race in 5 days 21:26:55. (This record was broken by the VO65 Abu Dhabi in the 2014 race with 4 days 13:10:28.) In July 2011 the VO70 Puma Mar Mostro won the TR 2011 on handicap, finishing second only to Rambler 100. At the 2011 Fastnet Race the three first monohulls were all VO70s and they all broke the existing monohull record. The record now stands at 1d 18hrs and 39 min set by VO70 Abu Dhabi.

WARRIOR owned by the US Merchant Marine Academy and Skippered by Stephen Murray Jr. holds the monohull record for the Vineyard Race of 17 hours, 42 minutes and 9 seconds set in 2017.

== Past records ==
A VO70 first broke the world monohull speed record in 2005, with other V70s resetting the record in subsequent years, such that the VO70s held the record for 10 consecutive years.

In April 2005, the VO70 Movistar broke the 24 hour world monohull speed record when she sailed 530 nautical miles. In 2006 ABN Amro II broke that record when she sailed 562.96 nautical miles. This record was broken in October 2008 by Ericsson 4 with 596.6 nm Ericsson 4 skipper Torben Grael and his crew made the record on the first leg of the 2008–2009 Volvo Ocean Race, when a strong cold front hit the fleet, bringing winds approaching 40 knots, and propelling the yacht at an average speed of 24.8 knots.

This record stood for 7 years until the supermaxi Comanche, a boat 30 feet longer than the VO70s, established a new record of 618.01 nautical miles on July 10–11, 2015 in the Transatlantic Race.

=== Pictures ===
Stopover Stockholm 2009

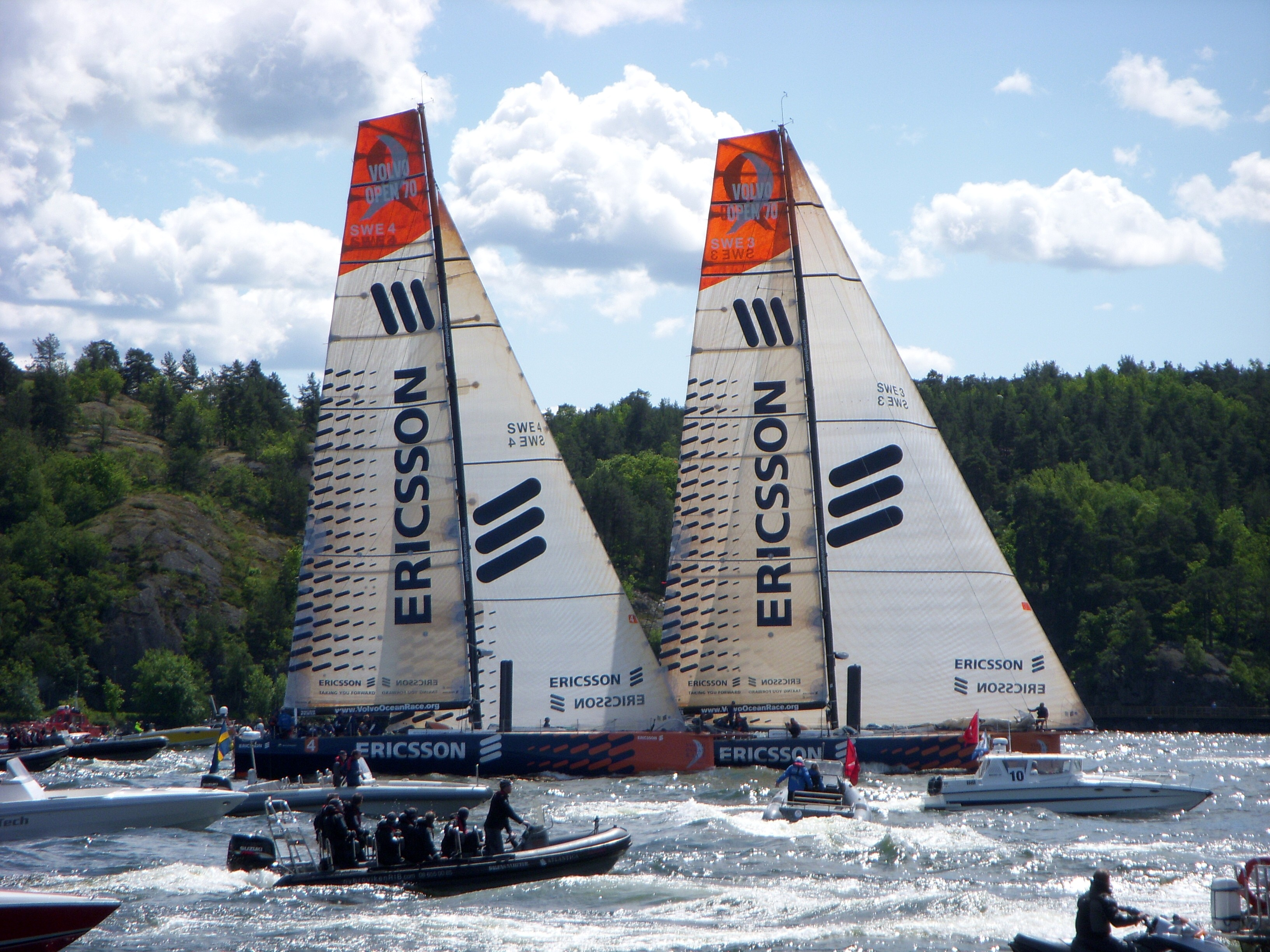
Ericsson 3 and Ericsson 4

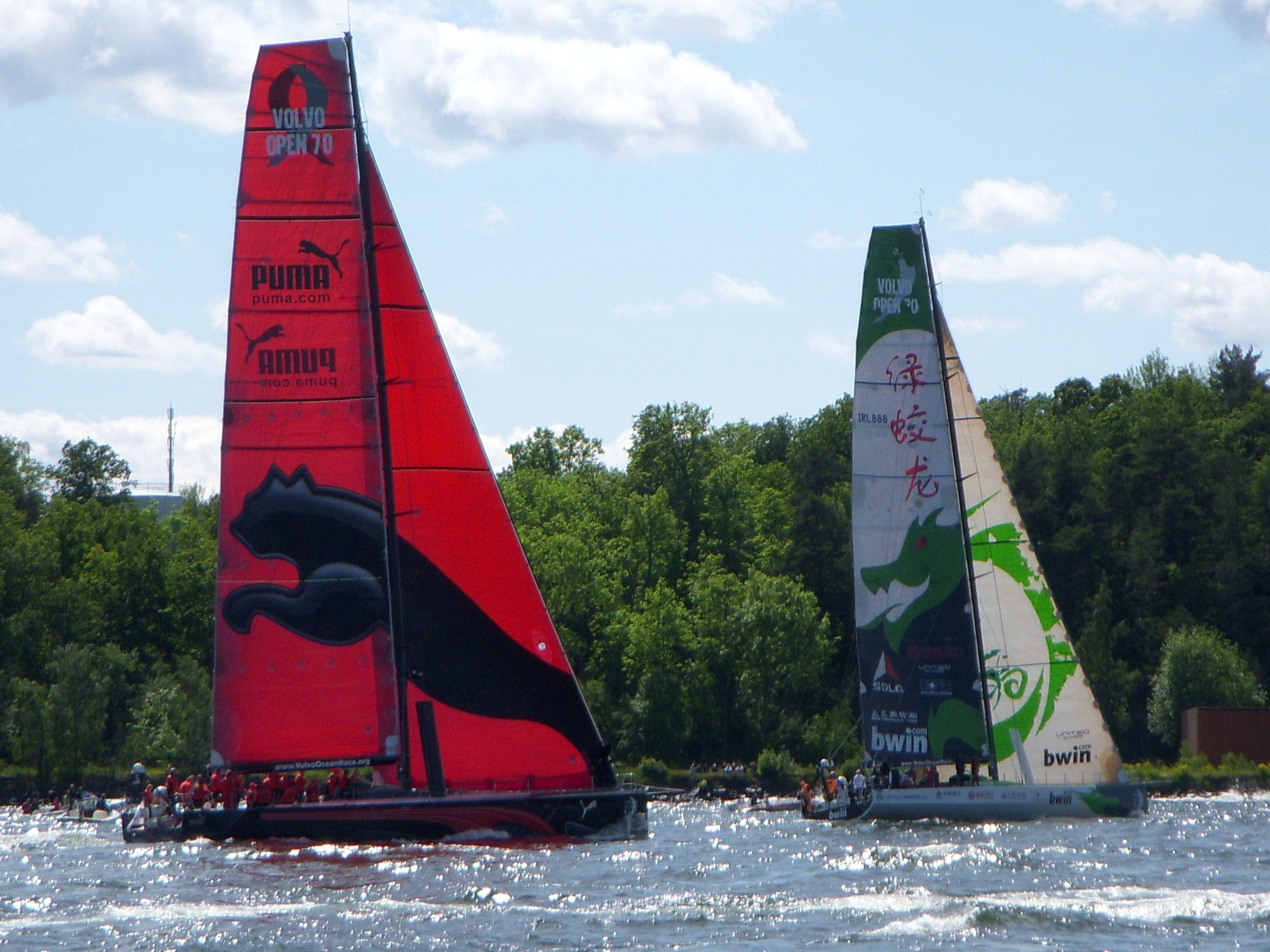
Puma and Green Dragon

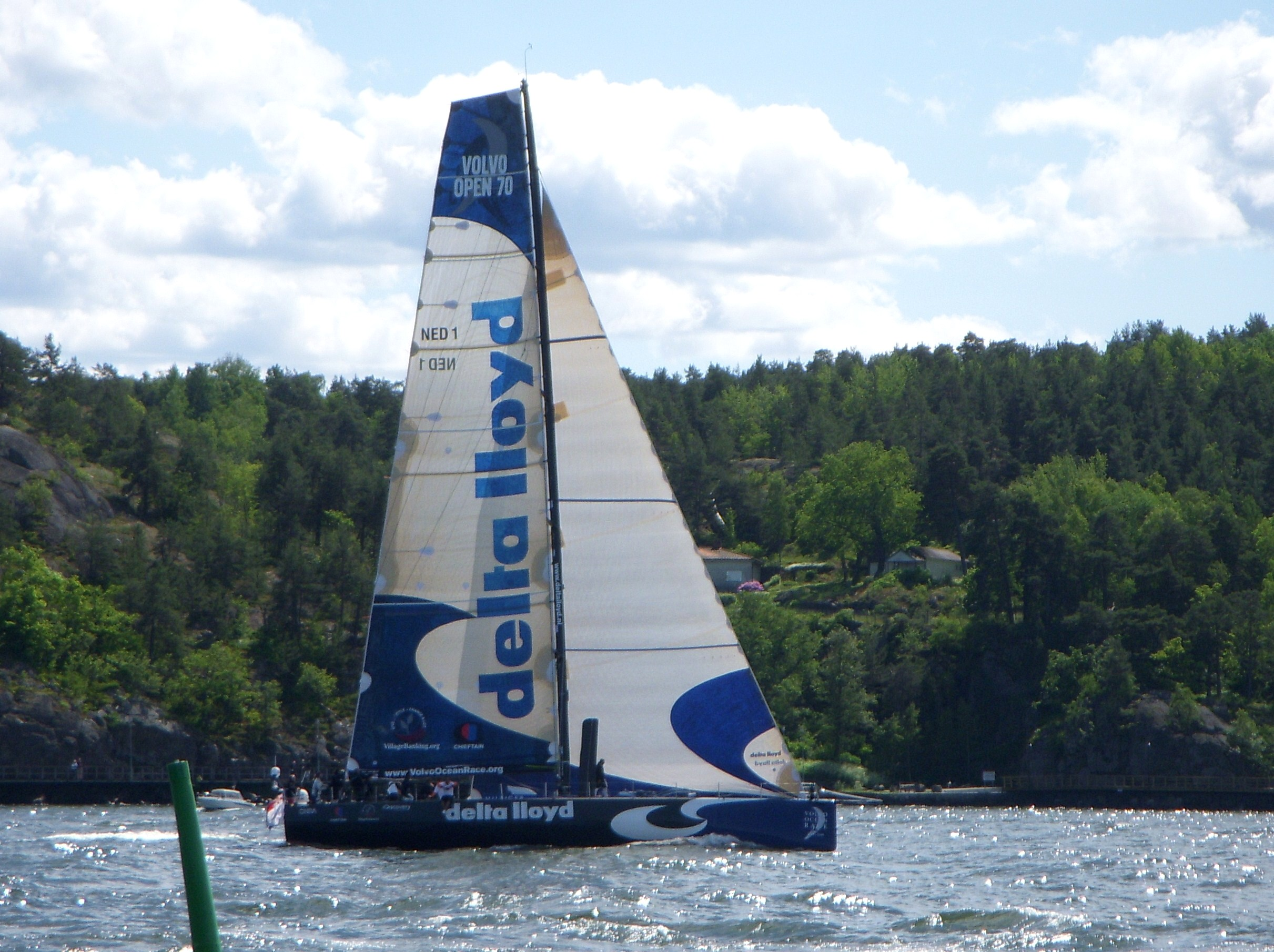
Delta Lloyd

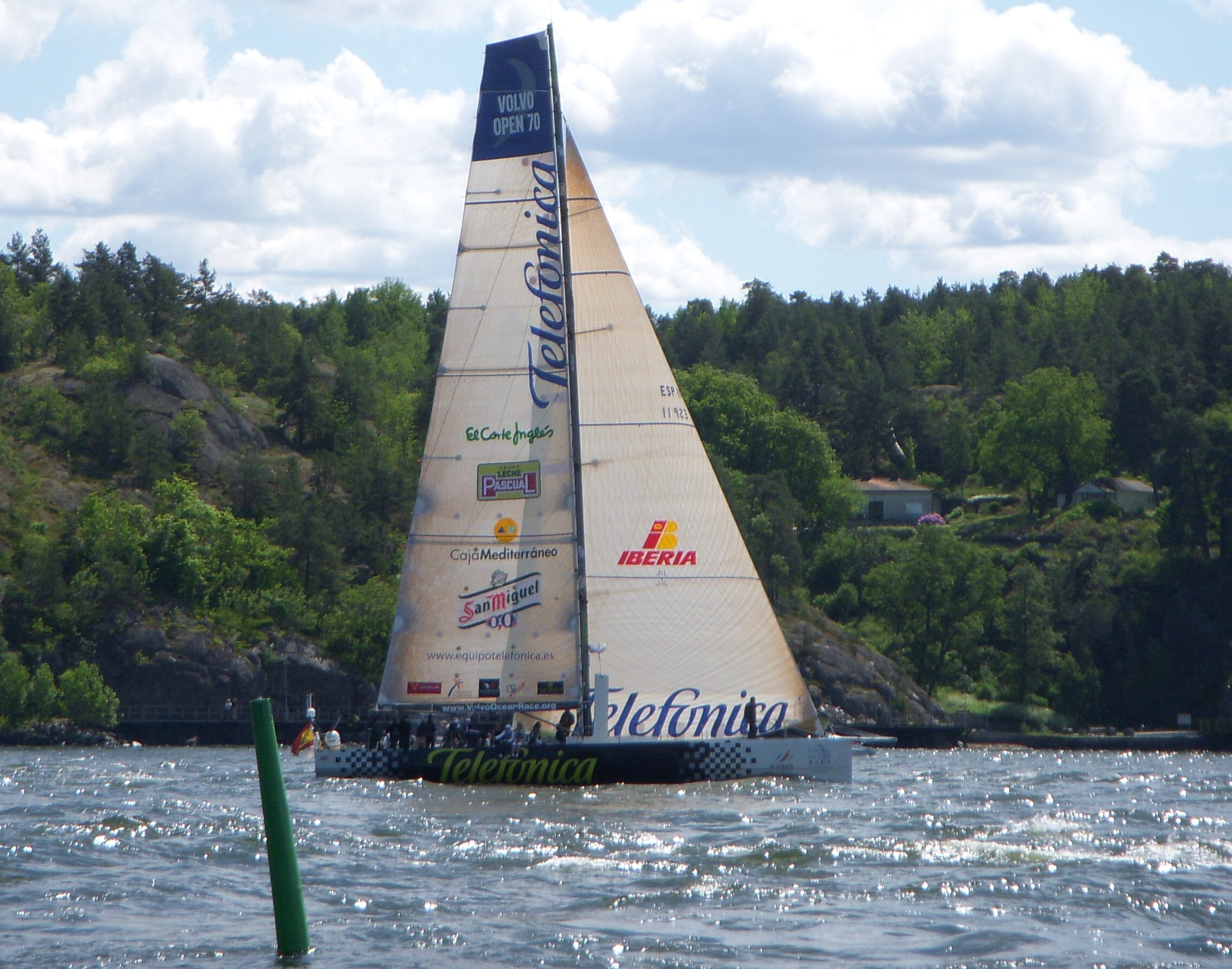
Telefónica Black
