= Nicorette (disambiguation) =

Nicorette is a brand of nicotine-replacement products.

Nicorette may refer to:

- Nicorette (1989 yacht), maxi yacht
- Nicorette (1996 yacht), Ericsson 80 yacht
- Nicorette II, maxi yacht
- Nicorette III, maxi yacht
