= 2000 Sydney to Hobart Yacht Race =

2000 annual yacht race in Australia

56th Sydney to Hobart Yacht Race
Event information
- Type: Yacht
- Dates: 26 December 2000 - 2 January 2001
- Sponsor: Telstra
- Host city: Sydney, Hobart
- Boats: 82
- Distance: 628 nautical miles (1,163 km)
- Website: Rolex Sydney Hobart

Results
- Winner (2000): Nicorette II (Ludde Ingvall)

Succession
- Previous: Nokia (Stefan Myralf & Michael Spies) in 1999
- Next: Assa Abloy (Neal McDonald) in 2001

The 2000 Sydney to Hobart Yacht Race, sponsored by Telstra, was the 56th annual running of the "blue water classic" Sydney to Hobart Yacht Race. As in past editions of the race, it was hosted by the Cruising Yacht Club of Australia based in Sydney, New South Wales. As with previous Sydney to Hobart Yacht Races, the 2000 edition began on Sydney Harbour, at noon on Boxing Day (26 December 2000), before heading south for 630 nautical miles (1,170 km) through the Tasman Sea, past Bass Strait, into Storm Bay and up the River Derwent, to cross the finish line in Hobart, Tasmania.

The 2000 fleet comprised 82 starters of which 58 completed the race and 24 yachts retired.

== Results ==
=== Line Honours ===
Pos	Sail Number	Yacht	State/Country	Yacht Type	LOA (Metres)	Skipper	Elapsed time d:hh:mm:ss
1	SWE11111	Nicorette	Sweden	Simonis-Voogd 79 Maxi	24.07	Ludde Ingvall	2:14:02:09
2	M10	Wild Thing	(Victoria (state)) Victoria	Murray Burns Dovell 83 Maxi	25.20	Grant Wharington	2:19:23:41
3	GER4014	Illbruck	Germany	Farr Volvo Ocean 60	19.44	John Kostecki	2:20:03:47
4	BER2000	Tyco	Bermuda	Farr Volvo Ocean 60	19.44	Kevin Shoebridge	2:20:49:46
5	8679	News Corp	New South Wales	Farr Volvo Ocean 60	19.44	Ross Field; Jez Fanstone	3:01:35:35
6	HKG1997	Assa Abloy Semcon R&D	Hong Kong	Farr Volvo Ocean 60	19.44	Richard Brisius; Mark Rudiger	3:03:58:12
7	DEN2001	Nokia	Denmark	Farr Volvo Ocean 60	19.44	Stefan Myralf	3:08:46:59
8	YC1000	SAP Ausmaid	South Australia	Farr 47	14.47	Kevan Pearce	3:09:44:43
9	1836	Yendys	New South Wales	Farr 49	15.07	Geoff Ross	3:11:25:30
10	AUS6606	Quest	(United Kingdom) Great Britain	Nelson Marek 46	14.30	Chris Bull	3:12:58:10
11	AUS70	Ragamuffin	New South Wales	Farr 50	15.05	Syd Fischer	3:13:55:26
12	8448	Loki	New South Wales	Frers Swan 48	14.83	Stephen Ainsworth	3:16:33:16
13	RQ160	Cruz Control	Queensland	Smith Santa Cruz 52	16.19	Maynard Smith	3:16:58:46
14	9797	Ninety Seven	New South Wales	Farr 47	14.32	Graham Gibson	3:17:00:45
15	6037	Eureka	Queensland	Murray Burns Dovell MBD 60	18.20	Bob Robertson	3:17:57:03
16	3105	Doctor Who	Tasmania	Davidson 52	15.70	Roger Jackman	3:20:27:31
17	4100	Terra Firma	(Victoria (state)) Victoria	Murray 41	12.45	Peter Bartels; Stewart Niemann	3:22:26:07
18	558	Interum	Tasmania	Lyons 41	12.16	Craig King	4:02:34:08
19	GBR49040	Aera	(United Kingdom) Great Britain	Frers Swan 46	14.36	Nicholas Lykiardopulo	4:02:59:26
20	SM541	Kaos	(Victoria (state)) Victoria	Inglis 40	12.00	Peter Blake	4:03:06:51
21	R930	Sorbent Helsal II	(Victoria (state)) Victoria	Adams 20 Pocket Maxi	20.40	William Rawson	4:03:09:03
22	SM377	Summit Bacardi	(Victoria (state)) Victoria	Peterson 44	13.34	Graeme Ainley; John Williams	4:03:31:27
23	NZL6006	Starlight Express	New Zealand	Davidson 55	16.87	Stewart Thwaites	4:06:26:48
24	R33	Chutzpah	(Victoria (state)) Victoria	Murray Burns Dovell MBD 36	10.99	Bruce Taylor	4:06:28:24
25	5527	Polaris of Belmont	New South Wales	Cole 43	13.24	John Quinn	4:06:40:34
26	546	Why Do I Do It	Tasmania	Lyons Jarkan 38	11.70	Wayne Banks-Smith	4:07:21:04
27	A8	Mirrabooka	Tasmania	Frers 47	13.40	John Bennetto	4:08:08:45
28	705	Spirit of Sydney	New South Wales	Lexcen Open 60	18.40	David Pryce	4:08:30:00
29	242	Sea Jay	New South Wales	Burns BH 41	12.46	Scott Wheelhouse	4:08:50:47
30	8338	AFR Midnight Rambler	New South Wales	Hick 35	10.53	Ed Psaltis; Bob Thomas	4:09:19:45
31	RP999	Frontier Economics	Queensland	Jutson 43	12.88	Brian Graves	4:09:19:45
32	SM2	Another Challenge	(Victoria (state)) Victoria	Murray Burns Dowell Sydney 38 OD	11.78	Lou Abrahams	4:10:55:17
33	4057	Aurora	New South Wales	Farr 40	12.19	Jim Holley	4:11:47:35
34	B400	Simply Red	(Victoria (state)) Victoria	Farr 40	12.25	Chris Bradbury	4:12:33:23
35	533	Pippin	New South Wales	Farr 37	11.40	David Taylor	4:18:06:46
36	1124	Hot Property	Tasmania	Farr 37 IOR Custom	11.17	David Hansen	4:19:32:42
37	B52	B52	Tasmania	Murray Burns Dovell Sydney 41	12.49	Hughie Lewis	4:21:10:10
38	B370	By Order Of The Secretary	(Victoria (state)) Victoria	Davidson Cavalier 37	11.20	Rex Billing; John Porter	4:22:17:50
39	MH106	Impeccable	New South Wales	Peterson 3/4 Tonner IOR	10.20	John Walker	5:02:11:23
40	GBR2183	Sunstone	(United Kingdom) Great Britain	Sparkman & Stephens S&S 39	12.47	Tom & Vicky Jackson	5:04:23:15
41	M19	Simsion Bowles	(Victoria (state)) Victoria	Davidson 36	10.90	Wayne Reynolds	5:05:33:14
42	4924	She II	New South Wales	Mull Olsen 40	12.29	Peter Rogers	5:07:00:00
43	S85	Raffles	(Victoria (state)) Victoria	Sayer 35 Cruiser-Racer	10.60	Paul Roberts	5:07:39:29
44	SA998	Epsilon	South Australia	Van de Stadt Forna 37	11.50	Michael Tromp	5:07:48:59
45	3807	Alexander	Australian Capital Territory	Swarbrick S36	11.16	Warren Hellwig	5:09:24:25
46	2557	Hogbreath Witchdoctor	New South Wales	Davidson 40 IOR Two Tonner	12.00	Maurie Cameron	5:09:49:56
47	A113	Mark Twain	New South Wales	Sparkman & Stephens S&S 39	11.80	Hugh O'Neill	5:15:13:32
48	M236	Santana	New South Wales	Holland Swan 43	13.09	Mike Kelaher	5:16:48:44
49	B247	Amaya	(Victoria (state)) Victoria	Farr 11.6	12.04	David Bingham	5:19:52:44
50	8333	Urban Guerilla	New South Wales	Hick 30	8.90	Christopher Bowling	5:22:43:33
51	5891	Komatsu Blue Lady	New South Wales	Challenger 39	11.88	Shane Kearns; Jacqui Begbie	6:01:05:22
52	S521	Not Negotiable	(Victoria (state)) Victoria	Holman & Pye UFO 34	10.46	Michael Dolphin	6:03:39:32
53	5659	Antipodes of Sydney	New South Wales	Dixon Taswell 56	17.07	Geoffrey Hill	6:03:48:25
54	371	Berrimilla	New South Wales	Joubert Brolga 33	10.10	Alex Whitworth	6:04:09:27
55	SM596	Breakaway	(Victoria (state)) Victoria	Swanson 36	10.97	Martin Power	6:04:56:33
56	327	Zeus II	New South Wales	Joubert Currawong 30	9.00	James Dunstan	6:06:02:42
57	47	Kemenys	New South Wales	Adams Zeston 40	12.30	Gabor Kemeny	6:08:36:43
58	5664	Delta Wing	New South Wales	Boden 44 Cruiser	13.52	William Koppe	7:00:40:24
DNF	7878	Aspect Computing	New South Wales	Lyons 52	16.20	David Pescud	Retired-Rigging Problems
DNF	6572	Icefire	New South Wales	Mummery 45	13.80	Terry Mullens	Retired-Torn Mainsail
DNF	ITA12821	Orsa Maggiore	Italy	Vallicelli 93 Ketch Maxi	28.30	Paolo Saccenti	Retired-Skipper's Discretion
DNF	NZL80	Shockwave	New Zealand	Reichel Pugh 80 Maxi	24.40	Neville Crichton	Retired-Skipper's Discretion
DNF	A99	Xena	New South Wales	Dovell MBD Open 60	18.18	Sean Langman	Retired-Torn Mainsail
DNF	7181	Swifty	(Victoria (state)) Victoria	Hick 43	13.00	Robert Hick	Retired-Undisclosed Reasons
DNF	C1	Brindabella	New South Wales	Jutson 75	22.85	George Snow	Retired-Bow Delamination Issues
DNF	4862	Crane Metals	New South Wales	Smith Compass 38	11.38	Tim Cowdery	Retired-Undisclosed Reasons
DNF	278	Galatea	New South Wales	Swarbrick S111	11.10	Bill Killinger	Retired-Undisclosed Reasons
DNF	8402	More Witchcraft	New South Wales	Dibbley Eagle 46	13.94	John Cameron	Retired-Undisclosed Reasons
DNF	S1	Valtair	New South Wales	Lyons 66	20.30	Matt Allen	Retired-Radio Problems
DNF	52001	Loco	New South Wales	Farr 52 OD	16.00	David Coe	Retired-Disqualified ^{1}
DNF	4000	Sagacious V	(Victoria (state)) Victoria	Farr 40 IOR	12.90	Ian Paterson	Retired-Crew Member Injury
DNF	38	Southerly	New South Wales	Peel 35	10.58	Don Mickleborough	Retired-Undisclosed Reasons
DNF	RQ2000	Ocean Designs	Queensland	Murray Burns Dovell Sydney 41	12.46	Stephen Bean	Retired-Disqualified ^{1}
DNF	6296	Comvergent Telecommunications	New South Wales	Elliott 40	12.18	James Murchison	Retired-Radio Problems
DNF	1317	Kickatinalong	New South Wales	Adams 13	13.41	Mike De Berg	Retired-Radio Problems
DNF	7441	Bumblebee 5	New South Wales	Murray Burns Dowell MBD 62	19.00	John Kahlbetzer	Retired-Damaged Keel
DNF	8118	Shipping Central	New South Wales	Farr Beneteau 40.7	11.92	Michael Spies	Retired-Broken Rudder
DNF	YC560	Doctel Rager	South Australia	Elliott 56	17.06	Gary Shanks	Retired-Boat Damage
DNF	3809	Lady Penrhyn	New South Wales	Swarbrick S36	11.10	Greg Stewart	Retired-Crew Member Injury
DNF	RQ23	Boomaroo Morse Fans	Queensland	Sparkman & Stephens S&S 34	10.30	John McIntosh	Retired-Lost Liferaft
DNF	S4440	Midnight Rambler II	(Victoria (state)) Victoria	Farr 40	12.24	Dennis Millikan	Retired-Undisclosed Reasons
DNF	YC717	Liberator	South Australia	Farr 42	12.91	Geoff Catt	Retired-Undisclosed Reasons

Notes

^1 – Loco and Ocean Designs were both disqualified from the race and was scored as a DNF by the Race Committee due to breaching Sailing Instruction Rule 43.2 by failing to report into race control within one hour of passing the Green Cape mandatory safety check-in point before entering the Bass Strait during the race.

=== Overall Handicap ===
Pos	Division	Sail Number	Yacht	State/Country	Yacht Type	LOA (Metres)	Skipper	Corrected time d:hh:mm:ss
1	A	YC1000	SAP Ausmaid	South Australia	Farr 47	14.47	Kevan Pearce	2:19:13:38
2	A	AUS6606	Quest	(United Kingdom) Great Britain	Nelson Marek 46	14.30	Chris Bull	2:21:14:30
3	A	1836	Yendys	New South Wales	Farr 49	15.07	Geoff Ross	2:21:35:35
4	A	9797	Ninety Seven	New South Wales	Farr 47	14.32	Graham Gibson	2:22:28:16
5	A	AUS70	Ragamuffin	New South Wales	Farr 50	15.05	Syd Fischer	3:00:12:07
6	A	4100	Terra Firma	(Victoria (state)) Victoria	Murray 41	12.45	Peter Bartels; Stewart Niemann	3:00:32:43
7	B	8338	AFR Midnight Rambler	New South Wales	Hick 35	10.53	Ed Psaltis; Bob Thomas	3:00:34:56
8	B	3105	Doctor Who	Tasmania	Davidson 52	15.70	Roger Jackman	3:00:41:27
9	B	R33	Chutzpah	(Victoria (state)) Victoria	Murray Burns Dovell MBD 36	10.99	Bruce Taylor	3:02:11:26
10	B	558	Interum	Tasmania	Lyons 41	12.16	Craig King	3:03:20:46
11	B	546	Why Do I Do It	Tasmania	Lyons Jarkan 38	11.70	Wayne Banks-Smith	3:04:49:52
12	B	4057	Aurora	New South Wales	Farr 40	12.19	Jim Holley	3:05:07:33
13	B	SM2	Another Challenge	(Victoria (state)) Victoria	Murray Burns Dowell Sydney 38 OD	11.78	Lou Abrahams	3:06:05:43
14	C	GBR2183	Sunstone	(United Kingdom) Great Britain	Sparkman & Stephens S&S 39	12.47	Tom & Vicky Jackson	3:06:23:20
15	C	B370	By Order Of The Secretary	(Victoria (state)) Victoria	Davidson Cavalier 37	11.20	Rex Billing; John Porter	3:06:29:25
16	B	B400	Simply Red	(Victoria (state)) Victoria	Farr 40	12.25	Chris Bradbury	3:07:06:18
17	B	A8	Mirrabooka	Tasmania	Frers 47	13.40	John Bennetto	3:07:24:40
18	A	6037	Eureka	Queensland	Murray Burns Dovell MBD 60	18.20	Bob Robertson	3:08:01:13
19	B	242	Sea Jay	New South Wales	Burns BH 41	12.46	Scott Wheelhouse	3:08:50:49
20	C	1124	Hot Property	Tasmania	Farr 37 IOR Custom	11.17	David Hansen	3:09:05:22
21	A	NZL6006	Starlight Express	New Zealand	Davidson 55	16.87	Stewart Thwaites	3:13:22:08
22	C	SA998	Epsilon	South Australia	Van de Stadt Forna 37	11.50	Michael Tromp	3:13:47:25
23	C	327	Zeus II	New South Wales	Joubert Currawong 30	9.00	James Dunstan	3:14:29:09
24	B	B52	B52	Tasmania	Murray Burns Dovell Sydney 41	12.49	Hughie Lewis	3:16:48:10
25	C	3807	Alexander	Australian Capital Territory	Swarbrick S36	11.16	Warren Hellwig	3:17:51:27
26	C	S521	Not Negotiable	(Victoria (state)) Victoria	Holman & Pye UFO 34	10.46	Michael Dolphin	3:19:05:37
27	B	S85	Raffles	(Victoria (state)) Victoria	Sayer 35 Cruiser-Racer	10.60	Paul Roberts	3:19:07:20
28	B	8333	Urban Guerilla	New South Wales	Hick 30	8.90	Christopher Bowling	3:20:20:37
29	C	SM596	Breakaway	(Victoria (state)) Victoria	Swanson 36	10.97	Martin Power	3:21:18:45
30	C	5891	Komatsu Blue Lady	New South Wales	Challenger 39	11.88	Shane Kearns; Jacqui Begbie	4:00:18:37
31	A	5659	Antipodes of Sydney	New South Wales	Dixon Taswell 56	17.07	Geoffrey Hill	4:16:43:56
DNF	A	C1	Brindabella	New South Wales	Jutson 75	22.85	George Snow	Retired-Bow Delamination Issues
DNF	A	52001	Loco	New South Wales	Farr 52 OD	15.85	David Coe	Retired-Disqualified ^{1}
DNF	B	4000	Sagacious V	(Victoria (state)) Victoria	Farr 40 IOR	12.90	Ian Paterson	Retired-Crew Member Injury
DNF	C	38	Southerly	New South Wales	Peel 35	10.58	Don Mickleborough	Retired-Undisclosed Reasons
DNF	A	7441	Bumblebee 5	New South Wales	Murray Burns Dowell MBD 62	19.00	John Kahlbetzer	Retired-Damaged Keel
DNF	B	8118	Shipping Central	New South Wales	Farr Beneteau 40.7	11.92	Michael Spies	Retired-Broken Rudder
DNF	C	3809	Lady Penrhyn	New South Wales	Swarbrick S36	11.10	Greg Stewart	Retired-Crew Member Injury
DNF	C	RQ23	Boomaroo Morse Fans	Queensland	Sparkman & Stephens S&S 34	10.30	John McIntosh	Retired-Lost Liferaft

Notes

^1 – Loco were disqualified from the race and was scored as a DNF by the Race Committee due to breaching Sailing Instruction Rule 43.2 by failing to report into race control within one hour of passing the Green Cape mandatory safety check-in point before entering the Bass Strait during the race.
