= Pieter van Nieuwenhuyzen =

Dutch sailor (born 1971)

Pieter van Nieuwenhuijzen (born 1971) is a Dutch sailor who has competed in multiple America's Cups.

He sailed in the 1997–98 Whitbread Round the World Race aboard the Dutch entry, Brunel Sunergy.

van Nieuwenhuijzen was with AmericaOne for the 2000 Louis Vuitton Cup, where he was on the shore team. He then joined Alinghi as a grinder in October 2000.

He sailed with Alinghi when they won the 2003 America's Cup. He was the first Dutchman to be on a winning boat.

van Nieuwenhuijzen was part of Alinghi's successful 2007 America's Cup defence and their victory in the 2008 iShares Cup. He sailed in the Louis Vuitton Pacific Series and the 2009 World Match Racing Tour. He was a bowman on Alinghi 5 when it lost the 2010 America's Cup.

Later that year, van Nieuwenhuijzen joined Oracle Racing and sailed with Jimmy Spithill when they won the 2010 RC44 World Championships. He sailed with Oracle in the 2011–13 America's Cup World Series.

In 2012, he joined the Quantum Racing team as their grinder. Quantum Racing won the 52 Super Series in 2013, 2014 and 2016 and the TP52 World Championships in 2014. He also sailed with Artemis Racing in the 2016 RC44 Bermuda Cup.
