= Kevin Shoebridge =

New Zealand sailor

Kevin Shoebridge is a New Zealand sailor who has competed in multiple Volvo Ocean Races and America's Cups.

In the 1985–86 Whitbread Round the World Race, Shoebridge sailed on board Lion New Zealand.

In 1987, Shoebridge joined the New Zealand Challenge for the America's Cup and sailed on board KZ 7 in the 1987 Louis Vuitton Cup.

He then returned to sail the 1989–90 Whitbread Round the World Race as a watch leader, on eventual winner Steinlager 2, before winning the 1993–94 Whitbread Round the World Race on NZ Endeavour.

Shoebridge then joined Team New Zealand and was part of the crew on NZL 32 when it won the 1995 America's Cup. He later sailed in the 1997–98 Whitbread Round the World Race as a watch captain on Merit Cup.

He skippered Team Tyco in the 2000 Sydney to Hobart Yacht Race and the 2001–02 Volvo Ocean Race, placing fourth in both races. He joined America's OneWorld challenge in the 2003 Louis Vuitton Cup as a trimmer before rejoining Team New Zealand for the 2007 America's Cup as the sailing and operations manager.

He served as Chief Operating Officer for Camper Lifelovers in the 2011–12 Volvo Ocean Race. In 2017, he was appointed as Chief Operating Officer of Emirates Team New Zealand for their successful 35th America's Cup challenge in Bermuda (2017). He continued in the role during the team's successful defence of the 36th America's Cup in Auckland (2021) and its subsequent defence for the 37th America's Cup in Barcelona (2024). He is currently involved in preparations for the 38th America's Cup, scheduled to take place in Naples in 2027.
