= 1993 Sydney to Hobart Yacht Race =

1993 annual yacht race in Australia

49th Sydney to Hobart Yacht Race
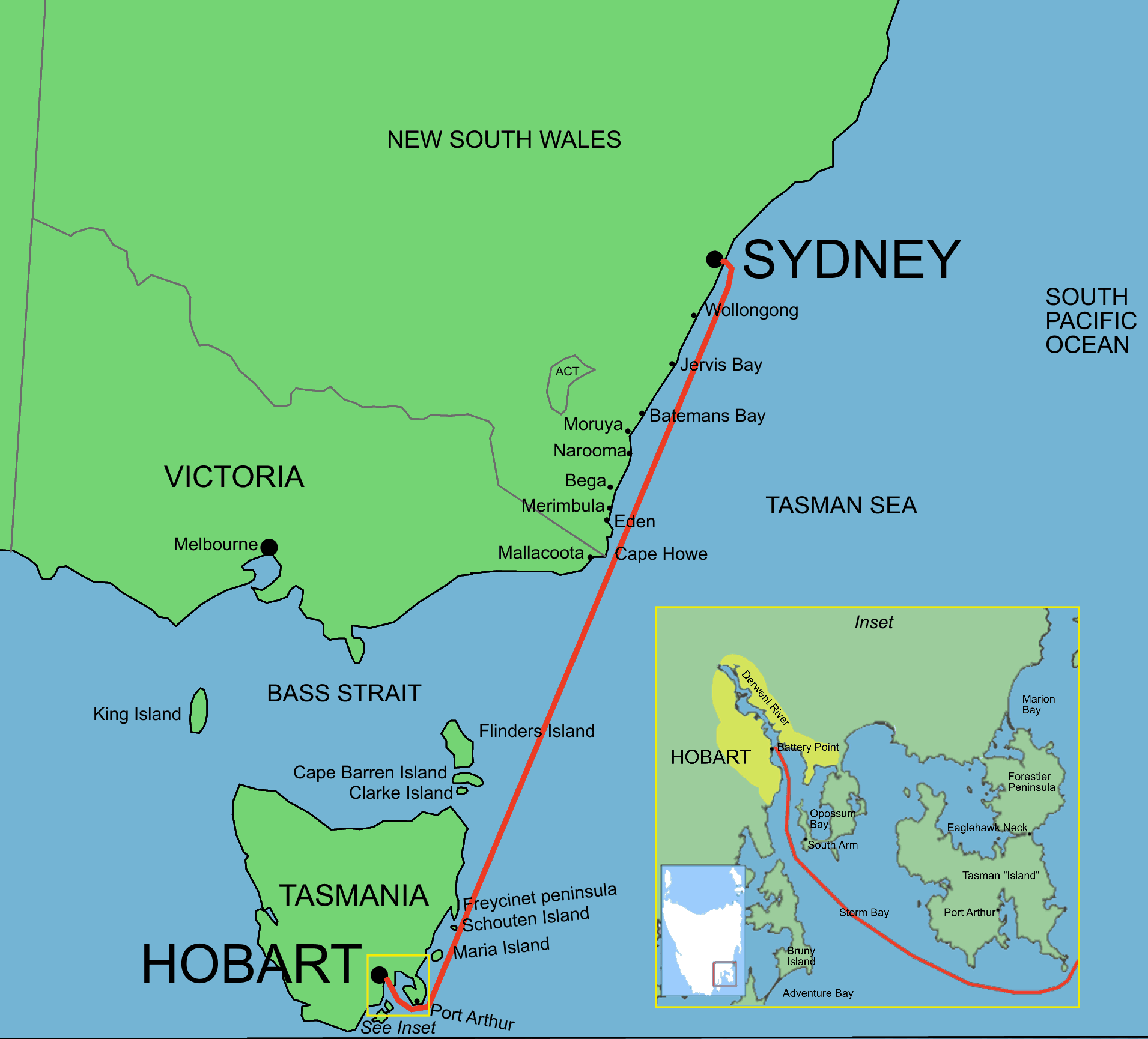

Event information
- Type: Yacht
- Dates: 26 December 1993 - 3 January 1994
- Sponsor: Kodak
- Host city: Sydney, Hobart
- Boats: 104
- Distance: 628 nautical miles (1,163 km)
- Website: Rolex Sydney Hobart

Results
- Winner (1993): Ninety Seven (Andrew Strachan)

Succession
- Previous: New Zealand Endeavour (Grant Dalton) in 1992
- Next: Tasmania (Robert Clifford) in 1994

The 1993 Sydney to Hobart Yacht Race, sponsored by Kodak, was the 49th annual running of the Australian "blue water classic" Sydney to Hobart Yacht Race. It was hosted by the Cruising Yacht Club of Australia based in Sydney.

The 1993 race, as in every year, began on Port Jackson (Sydney Harbour), at noon on Boxing Day (26 December 1993) before heading south for 630 nautical miles (1,170 km) through the Tasman Sea, past Bass Strait into Storm Bay and up the River Derwent to cross the finish line in Hobart, Tasmania.

== Race calamity ==
The 1993 fleet comprised 104 starters. Of those 104 starters, only 38 of them completed the race due to severe weather conditions which struck the fleet near the south-eastern Australian coast as they entered Bass Strait at night. This race was arguably the toughest in recent history as the lowest number of completing yachts attests as does a staggering attrition rate. Fortunately there were no fatalities (in contrast to the 1998 yacht race, in which six died).

An unusually strong low pressure depression of 986 hpa developed, that a CSIRO Oceanography satellite photograph (unusual at the time) revealed as a spiral cloud stretching down the Queensland coast across the Tasman Sea to the south island of New Zealand back across to Tasmania and corkscrewing in to the storm center in Bass Strait, where the fleet were centred. The weather built into an exceptionally strong storm (which had similar strength winds to a lower-category hurricane reaching up to 70 knots and estimated 12-meter seas, resulting in two yachts abandoned and a man overboard incident. Additionally a record 66 yachts retired from the race or sank. The winning yacht Ninety Seven recorded 78 knots (144 km/h) of wind either side of the eye of the low off Gabo Island on the night of 27 December.

The April/May 1994 edition of Offshore (the official journal of CYCA) contained articles in a retrospective analysis of the 1993 Hobart race. David Lyons, the designer and crew aboard Cuckoos Nest, the IMS handicap winner, made the following personal comment, when asked why so many yachts had failed to complete, he said; 1. Yacht structural designs being inadequate for the conditions. 2. A misunderstanding of ABS approval processes. 3. Refined rig designs that fail to meet the race loads. 4. Poor maintenance. 5. Yachts pushed beyond design limits. 6. Crews retiring due to own limitations when tired and seasick, which goes to adequacy of experience.

In an article on helmsmanship during the race, John Gray, an AYF Offshore Yachtmaster aboard Sea-U-Later, a 12m admirals cup yacht, described how they discovered only 3 out of 8 crew were capable of helming in those conditions at night, without endangering the boat or crew, and then for only one hour at a time. Early recognition of this and altering watches to cater was central to their survival and completion of the race. Only one of the three had previous Hobart experience, but all three were seasoned offshore racers.

They were also critical of the races on water weather forecasting, which during the three days of storm, did not alter its forecast for a following SE wind change, which never eventuated. But probably lured yachts further south and away from Tasmania than necessary before tacking due west to close the coast. Sea-U-Later along with other yachts tracked down the 151-degree east longitude, becoming becalmed for 20 hours around 42 degrees south, in the centre of the weakened low, that all weather reports had said had moved well into the Tasman Sea. Whilst a respite the delay cost them dearly, Sea-U-Later was 37th to complete the race. The official explanation of the meteorology during the period was in the same edition, but somehow this was not communicated to yachts at sea at the time.

As a response to the record retirement rate the Cruising Yacht Club of Australia issued an extensive questionnaire to yacht owners seeking comment on suitability of storm sails, adequacy of radio communications and suitability of CYCA's standard safety equipment. They were also asked to comment "As a result of your experience in this race is there anything you would do before starting, in say, the 1994 race to lessen the possibility of retiring should the same weather and sea conditions be anticipated'’.

In the 1993 Offshore race issue the CYCA had been "predicting a massive fleet of 200 yachts from around the world to mark this nautical milestone in yachting history" (the 50th anniversary race). The commodores message expanded, " I hope that all owners and skippers will back up again at the end of 1994 to make the 50th. Anniversary bash to Hobart one of the largest long ocean race fleets in the history of yachting, we believe a fleet in excess of 200 yachts is highly likely."

As the official Sydney to Hobart Yacht Race records now show, there were 371 starters and 309 finishers in 1994. It was not until 1998 that similar weather conditions returned with devastating results. Some of the lessons of 1993 had apparently not been learnt. has been the occasion for many sailboat capsizes, turtlings and fatalities.

== Race progress ==
The race began with an enticing spinnaker run, once out of the Sydney Heads increasing to about 20 knots (37 km/h) for the first 8 hours until around Port Kembla. There was a south bound current running at about 2 knots (3.7 km/h) off the NSW coast so when the southerly change came through it raised peaky seas and as the effect of the low increased the waves had no backs in them. South westers that had been blowing in Bass strait for several days cancelling the start of the Melbourne to Tasmania yacht races, had lumped up big seas that awaited the Hobart yachts. Through 27 December, the day after the start 29 boats retired, two of them abandoned sinking and a man lost overboard after the webbing of his harness snapped. Many yachts broke off racing to answer flares and three Mayday distress calls, some of the drama of the race included;

John Quinn 49 owner/skipper of the J/35 yacht MEM went overboard without lifejacket, about 11–30 pm when a wave flattened the yacht, and was miraculously rescued by an oil tanker the Ampol Sorrel who heard his crews radio call. In the dark of night in horrific conditions, they steamed to the search area then turned on a Searchlight and found him almost immediately. After being in the water 5 and ½ hrs He was picked up by the yacht Atari who had joined the search after losing her mast, and was nearby.

The crew of Adjuster abandoned her in sinking condition for the life raft which overturned and they spent the last hour clinging to it before rescue by Kingurra. The yacht Clwyd was swamped and eventually overturned when the keel fell off, the crew were rescued by Nynja Go then transferred to the radio relay vessel. The NZ yacht Swuzzlebubble VIII was rolled 360 degrees by a breaking wave, turtled, dismasted and swamped. On deck crew harnessed on were all recovered. The crew then cut the rig off, put out a No 3 headsil as a sea anchor and bailed her out while other yachts stood nearby. They managed to start the engine and motored into Eden. Meanwhile, Prime Factor of Adelaide came off a big wave at speed when the mast and the main bulkhead to which it was fastened pulled straight out of the deck of the boat and disappeared over the side. Two crew members of Advantaged were injured when the yacht capsized, snapping the mast off at the base, four crew were flung overboard but quickly recovered. The navigator was thrown through a bulkhead, head first. On Atara the mast slammed through the port side and it began taking water, but reached Eden where many sought shelter and carried out repairs. Brindabella a new Jutson 75 was retired with delamination at the bow, possibly after hitting a whale. By the end of 28 December 56 yachts had retired, a further 11 by the 30th see list below. At least one of the smallest yachts sheltered in NSW ports during the worst conditions and managed to complete the race within time.

This left Ninety Seven out in front with Cuckoos Nest a 40 footer crossing tacks during the race several times, Ninety seven eventually crossed 2 hours and 1 minute ahead of her rival. The IOR winner was Wild Oats.

== Fleet ==
Only 38 of the 104 yachts which started in the 1993 Sydney to Hobart Yacht Race finished. These yachts are listed below:

Yacht / LOA	Nation	Skipper	Crew	Overall, Division, Place
Ninety Seven, 14.3m	NSW	Andrew Strachan	J. de Sevier, P. Hutcheon, M.Green, S. Kulmar, D. Ellis, B. Stephens, R. Jacobs, J. Guluzd, P. Gale, N.Vidal, P. Morgan.	1st, IMS A, 1st.
Micropay Cuckoos Nest, 12.2m	NSW	Nigel Holman	P. West, G. Hyde, H. Treharne, D. Lyons, Andrew MF Miller, others TBA	2nd, IMS C, 1st.
Wild Thing 14.8m	Vic.	Grant Warrington	N. Abbott, S. Gilbert, S. Ruse, J. Graham, D. Evans, M. Mattson, T. Brown, P. Atkins, G. Cropley, N. Williamson, M. Auotti, D. Thorne.	3rd, TPHS A, 3rd.
Sword of Orion, 13.3m	Vic.	Peter Sajet / Charles Mehrmann	J.Collings, P. Dowdney, G. Rose, N. Drennan, S. Holding, J. Pelkovsek, W. Mehrmann, R. Bath, M. Malony, R. Grimes.	4th, IMS A, 2nd.
Bobsled Societe Generale, 20.7m	FRA	Kerry Spencer	Y. Pajot, R. Bird, R. Jones, A. Fox, G. Dews, P. Hermann, D. Evans, R. Galliot, J. Nevd, F. Xavier, F. Postel, E. Cordelle, C. Mody, C. Mathey, E. Croc, L. Cossais, M. Studer.	5th. TPHS A, 5th.
Solbourne Wild Oats, 13.1m	NSW	Bruce Foye/Roger Hickman/Lance Peckman	K.Batt, L. Wilson, D. Richards, A. Crowe, S. White, S. Hunt, C. Knox, P. Goldsworthy, L. Jamison.	6th, IOR A, 1st.
Hartz Mineral Waters, 13.3m	NSW	Robert Mulkearns	M. Spies, A. Roxburgh, J. Ogalvie, D. O'Rooke, M. Chatarnoskvi, T. Clear, J. Hurley, G. Harland, K. Hansford, G. Kohn, J. Gibson, D. Barnhill.	7th, IMS B, 2nd.
Liberator, 11.9m	SA	Doug Curlewis	P. Kane, G. Melody, J. Mooney, T. Alcott, M. Wilson, M. Critchley, R. Tyson, P. Dorien.	8th, IMS C, 2nd.
Mirrabooka, 14.3m	Tas.	John and Peter Bennetto	P. Foster, H. Bain, P Weatherhead, S. Wilson, L. Nibbs, S. Firth, T. Richardson, M. Grainger, G. Linacre.	9th, IMS B, 3rd.
Collex Onyx, 15.6m	NSW	Alyn Ovenden	P. Hewson, R. Gallimar, Others TBA	10th, IMS A, 3rd.
Team Fujitsu	NSW	Gunns & Zanelli		11th, IOR A, 2nd.
Helsal II, 20.0m	SA	Keith Flint	I. Flint, J. Howell, C. Wall-Smith, J. Champ, T. Cudmore, N. Smiley, T. Deslandes, P. Strangway, R. Knill, B. Magor, L. Doston, N. Butcher, B. Weatherall, N. Fleming, B. Moore, J. Butler.	12th, IOR A, 3rd.
Bacardi, 13.3m	Vic.	Graham Ainley/ John Williams	S. Charles, others TBA	13th, IMS B, 1st.
Bright Morning Star, 15.5m	NSW	Ian Treharne	P. Murray, F. Holmes, N. Easton, C. Henson, G. Bussell, B. Thomas, G. Hartley, D. Mair, R. Tedder, B. Waipole.	14th. TPHS A, 2nd.
Pilgrim,	NSW	Des Quirk	J. Murrant, C. Quirk, R. Lewis, P. Fletcher, S. Kent, others TBA	15th, IMS B, 4th.
Iceberg, 15.9m	NSW	Graham Gibson	J. Forbes, J. Holley, G. Morgan, P. Sainsbury, R. Kellet, M. O'Dea, P. Heinonen, D. Notley, M. Konopka, H. Peper, J. McCulloch, M. Capon.	16th. IMS B, 5th.
Sheraton Hobart, 12.2m	Tas.	Ian Smith	Others TBA	17th. IOR B, 2nd.
Telecom Mobilenet, 12.2m	NSW	Kerry Goudge	J. Torney, C. Caffery, A. Carr, C. Josling, K. Ewels, M. Kotecki, J. Gribble, B. Ryrie, B. Canham, W. O'Neil, A. Sherry, K. Holtz.	18th. IOR B, 4th.
Impeccable, 10.2m	NSW	John Walker	G. Cramp, R. Moore, D. Thomas, P. Beales, J. Nixon, F. Nelson, N. Elliot.	19th. IOR B, 1st.
Marara, 10.3m	NSW	Bill Ratcliff	B. Simpson, P. Taylor, J. Smith, G. Johnston, B. Lee.	20th. IMS D, 1st.
Mark Twain, 11.8m	NSW	Hugh O'Neil	B. Mills, B. Kenyon, C. Maclurcan, S. Gray, others TBA	21st. IMS D, 3rd.
Nynja Go, 11.0m	NSW	Dennis Pomfret	R. Howard, J. Howard, G. Marsden, G. Coolam, R. Hughes, others TBA	22nd. IMS D, 4th.
Witchdoctor, 12.2m	NSW	Rum Consortium	M. Cameron, C. Troup, J. Dodd, P. Reuter, T. Craven, J. Wuhrer, L. Meyer, B. McPherson, P. Franks, S. McBurnie.	23rd. IMS B, 8th.
Courtesan, 11.8m	SA	Graham Williams	A. Love, R. Greig, C. Pearman, C. Williams, M. Dennis, A. Leitch, A. Brinkworth.	24th. IMS B, 7th.
She II, 12.2m	NSW	T. Seccombe	A. Reed, J. Miller, A. Gruzman, T. Hannah, D. Ellis, C. Burges, K. Williams, F. Muirfield, P. Rodgers.	25th. IMS B, 6th.
All That Jazz, 12.0m	NSW	James Davern	D. Williams, V. Dudley, C. Oh, T. Osborne, S. Kelly, L. Tomaszewski, S.Mitchell.	26th. IMS D, 9th.
Fly By Night, 10.1m	Vic.	John Drake	R. Case, J. Last, C. McLean, C. Martin, A. Leape, G. Higgins.	27th. IOR B, 3rd.
Zeus II, 9.2m	NSW	Jim Dunstan	G. Thornton, P. Kerrigan, R. McConnell, P. Colvin, A. Robertson.	28th. IMS D, 2nd.
Charisma, 13.0m	NSW	James M Lawler	J. V. Lawler, R. Lawler, T. Cosh, P. Robinson, B. Loudon, K. Radford.	29th. TPHS A, 1st.
Utopia, 17.0m	QLD	John Fletcher	M. McLeod, S. Carter, others TBA	30th. TPHS A, 6th.
Take Time, 10.2m	NSW	Graham Smith	Daryl Holmes, Wayne Holmes, Dave Stock, P. Strusnel, John Clarke.	31st. IMS D, 8th.
Scorpio II, 10.4m	Vic.	Michael Haller,	K. Shimmin, L. Higgins, C. Higgins, O. Tuxan, A. Cousens.	32nd. TPHS A, 4th.
The Old Lion, 12.2m	SA	William Gryst	D. Strudwick, M.Woodard, S. Schmidt, P. Knott, T. Goldsworthy, D. Costa, W. Gryst, G. Shorland.	33rd. IMS D, 10th.
Katinka, 9.2m	NSW	Des O'Connell	Paul O'Connell, Peter O'Connell, others TBA	34th. IMS D, 7th.
Tiercel, 9.2m	Tas.	John Copeland	P. Bird, R. Beaumont, others TBA	35th. IMS D, 6th.
Boomaroo Morse Fans, 10.1	QLD	John McIntosh	G. Alexander, T. Avery, A. McIntosh, others TBA	36th. IMS D, 5th.
Sea-U-Later, 12.1m	QLD	John Mawer	Dave Irvine, John Gray, Richard Ames, Lester James, Ian Lydiard, Mark Irwin, Max Raabe	37th. IOR B, 5th.
Kingurra, 13.1m	Vic.	Peter Joubert	I. Plum, T. Vautin, C. Oldfield, D. Rout, W. Anderson, R. Broomhall, D. Parish, B. Waters, J. Scott.	38th. IMS B, NRR

== Retirements ==
The following is known of the 66 other yachts (listed in order of retirement date) that started but did not finish:

Yacht name	Owner/Charterer	Nationality	Date of retirement	Reason for retirement
Oz Fire	J. Wertheimer		27th.	rigging damage
Philips Lightning	J. Veeneklaas		27th.	sail damage
Star Ferry	J. Conroy		27th.	dismasted
Clwyd	J. Hyslop		27th.	abandoned and sank
Surefoot	D. Millikan		27th.	mast problems
Morning Mist III	A. Neate		27th.	damaged mast
Cassiopeia	C. Burnett	USA	27th.	gear damage
Kings Cross - Sydney	R. Stone		27th.	cracked mast
Dictator	R. Fidock		27th.	mast damage
Devil Woman	I. Griffiths		27th.	structural damage
Second Term	K. Court		27th.	no reason known
Amazon	P. Walker		27th.	torn sails
Salamanca Inn	J. Fuglsang		28th.	hull damage
Swuzzlebubble VIII	I. Gibbs	NZ	28th.	dismasted
Hammer of Queensland	A. Bloore		28th.	dismasted
Atara	J. Storey	IRE	28th.	dismasted
Fast Forward	P. Meikle		28th.	rudder damage
Innkeeper Petaluma Wines	A. Short		28th.	damaged headfoil
Toxic Waste	H. Hertzberg		28th.	no reason known
Adantedge	R. Egerton		28th.	no reason known
Assassin	R. Crawford		28th.	torn sails
Amacon Raw Talent	J. Simpson		28th.	no reason known
Flying Colours	J. Lake		28th.	no reason given
Georgia Express	J. Farmer		28th.	no reason known
Cadibarra 7	N. Jones		28th.	no reason known
Once More Dear Friends	J. & M. Stephen		28th.	no reason known
Mem	John Quinn		28th.	man overboard
She's Apples II	David Strong		28th.	hull damage
Rager	P. Bush		28th.	no reason known
Telecom Flexi Plans	P. Hansen		28th.	no reason given
Transocean Rookie III	B. Woods	NZ	28th.	rigging damage
Alona	T. Woodward		28th.	no reason known
Cougar	J. McCarthy		28th.	no reason known
Sir Thomas Sopwith	Ocean Youth Club of Australia		28th.	hull damage
Maglieri Wines Prime Factor	G. Vercoe		28th.	hull damage
Lindemans Ultimate Challenge	Lou Abrahams		28th.	hull damage
Adjuster	L. Emerson		28th.	sank after being abandoned
Hall Chadwick Nuzulu	Psaltis, Ward & Bencsik		28th.	rig failure
Silhouette	G. Hogarth		28th.	hull damage
Freight Train	Damien Parkes		28th.	minor problems
Ragamuffin	Syd Fischer		28th.	sail damage
Alexander of Cresswell	Dept of Defence (Navy)		28th.	mast damage
The Regency Heights Gambler	I. Kenny		28th.	no reason known
Savage	B. Eddington		28th.	no reason known
JLW Chutzpah	B. Taylor		28th.	dismasted
Double or Nothing	J. Bush		28th.	structural damage
CUB Sangaree	G. Creese		28th.	broken forestay
Elusive	G. Lavis		28th.	rigging problem
Maxi Ragamuffin	A. Starling		28th.	damaged mast
Never a Dull Moment	Colin Wilson		28th.	no reason known
Antira V	Sir G. Barwick		28th.	torn sails
Apollo II	J. Duffin		28th.	torn sails
Raptor	A. Eichenauer		28th.	mast damage
Rising Sun	N. Sneddon		28th.	hull damage
Shenandoah III	J. Charody		28th.	no reason known
Kingurra	Peter Joubert		28th.	cracked mast
Brindabella	George Snow		29th.	bow damage
Easy Touch	R. Green & P. Newman		29th.	no reason known
The Alice	Alice Springs Yacht Club		29th.	no reason known
Herman Miller	Peter Stronach		29th.	no reason known
Icarus	A. Ridley		29th.	dismasted
Myuna	T. Stokoe		29th.	no reason given
Magic	B. Rawson		29th.	no reason known
Rapaz	A. Petit		29th.	no reason known
Adria	G. Gjergja		29th.	mast damage
Wang	J. Saul		30th.	keel problems
City Limits	M. Carr		30th.	no reason known

== Results ==
=== Line Honours results (Top 10) ===
Position	Sail number	Yacht	State/Country	Yacht type	LOA (Metres)	Skipper	Elapsed time d:hh:mm:ss	Ref
1	AUS 9797	Ninety Seven	New South Wales	Farr IMS 47	14.30	Andrew Strachan	4:00:54:11	
2	MYC 2	Micropay Cuckoo's Nest	New South Wales	Lyons IMS 40	12.20	Nigel Holman	4:02:54:59	
3	M 101	Wild Thing	New South Wales	Inglis 47	14.80	Grant Wharington	4:07:44:30	
4	B 2000	Sword of Orion	(Victoria (state)) Victoria	Reichel Pugh 44 Sloop	13.30	Peter Sajet; Charles Mehrmann	4:10:17:02	
5	5444	Bobsled-Société Générale	Queensland	Steinman Pocket Maxi	20.70	Yves Pajot	4:14:33:45	
6	4343	Solbourne Wild Oats	New South Wales	Farr 43	13.10	Bruce Foye; Roger Hickman	4:16:48:48	
7	5180	Hartz Mineral Water	New South Wales	Dubois Two Tonner	13.30	Robert Mulkearns; Michael Spies	4:16:56:34	
8	B 200	Liberator	South Australia	Jutson IMS 39	11.90	Doug Curlewis	4:16:58:55	
9	A 8	Mirrabooka	Tasmania	Frers 47 Cruiser-Racer	14.30	John Bennetto	4:17:15:34	
10	4883	Collex Onyx	New South Wales	Adams-Radford 15	15.60	Alyn Ovenden	4:18:46:34	

=== Handicap results (Top 10) ===
==== IMS Division ====
Position	Sail number	Yacht	State/Country	Yacht type	LOA (Metres)	Skipper	Corrected time d:hh:mm:ss	Ref
1	MYC 2	Micropay Cuckoo's Nest	New South Wales	Lyons IMS 40	12.20	Nigel Holman	3:18:45:10	
2	AUS 9797	Ninety Seven	New South Wales	Farr IMS 47	14.30	Andrew Strachan	3:21:52:50	
3	1317	Marara	New South Wales	Sparkman & Stephens S&S 34	10.30	Bill Ratcliff	4:04:33:08	
4	B 200	Liberator	South Australia	Jutson IMS 39	11.90	Doug Curlewis	4:04:55:13	
5	SM 377	Bacardi	(Victoria (state)) Victoria	Peterson 44	13.30	Graeme Ainley; John Williams	4:05:22:14	
6	5180	Hartz Mineral Water	New South Wales	Dubois Two Tonner	13.30	Robert Mulkearns; Michael Spies	4:05:26:36	
7	A 8	Mirrabooka	Tasmania	Frers 47 Cruiser-Racer	14.30	John Bennetto	4:06:18:22	
8	B 2000	Sword of Orion	(Victoria (state)) Victoria	Reichel Pugh 44 Sloop	13.30	Peter Sajet; Charles Mehrmann	4:07:31:08	
9	327	Zeus II	New South Wales	Joubert Currawong 30	9.20	Jim Dunstan	4:07:46:45	
10	5091	Pilgrim	New South Wales	Farr Beneteau 46	13.90	Des Quirk	4:11:02:07	

==== IOR Division ====
Position	Sail number	Yacht	State/Country	Yacht type	LOA (Metres)	Skipper	Corrected time d:hh:mm:ss	Ref
1	4343	Solbourne Wild Oats	New South Wales	Farr 43	13.10	Bruce Foye; Roger Hickman	3:20:36:30	
2	4056	Team Fujitsu	New South Wales	Farr 43	13.10	Steve Gunns; Tony Zanelli	4:00:50:37	
3	MH 106	Impeccable	New South Wales	Peterson Three-Quarter Tonner	10.20	John Walker	4:01:26:42	
4	4117	Sheraton Hobart	Tasmania	Farr 40	12.20	Ian Smith	4:04:06:12	
5	B 133	Fly By Night	(Victoria (state)) Victoria	Humphreys Three Quarter Tonner	10.10	John Drake	4:09:13:30	
6	4040	Telecom Mobilenet	New South Wales	Farr 40	12.20	Kerry Goudge	4:09:26:45	
7	SA 93	Helsal II	South Australia	Adams Pocket Maxi	20.00	Keith Flint	5:00:33:18	
8	69	Seaulater	Queensland	Dubois 40 Sloop	12.10	John Mawer	5:14:59:09	

== See also ==
- 1979 Fastnet race
- 1998 Sydney to Hobart Yacht Race
- Fastnet race
- Turtling
