= Murray Ross (sailor) =

New Zealand sailor

Murray Ross (born in Whangarei, New Zealand, in 1950) is a New Zealand sailor and yacht designer who competed at the Summer Olympics and in the Whitbread Around the World race.

Ross sailed a Flying Dutchman with Jock Bilger, coming second at the 1971 Flying Dutchman World Championships before sailing at the 1972 Olympics, finishing 9th. They again finished second at the 1975 World Championships before competing at the 1976 Olympics, finishing 12th. New Zealand boycotted the 1980 Summer Olympics and so Ross did not compete.

Ross has competed in four Whitbread Around the World races, in 1985–86 he sailed with NZI Enterprise, in 1989–90 he was on the second place Fisher & Paykel NZ, in 1993–94 he spent one leg on board eventual W60 winner Yamaha, and in the 1997–98 race he was on Toshiba with Dennis Conner.

In 1999 Ross joined Connor's Stars & Stripes in a support role for the 2000 Louis Vuitton Cup. He played a similar role for Luna Rossa Challenge for the 2003 Louis Vuitton Cup.

He has designed a series of boats, including the Ross 930.
