= 1992 Sydney to Hobart Yacht Race =

1992 annual yacht race in Australia

48th Sydney to Hobart Yacht Race
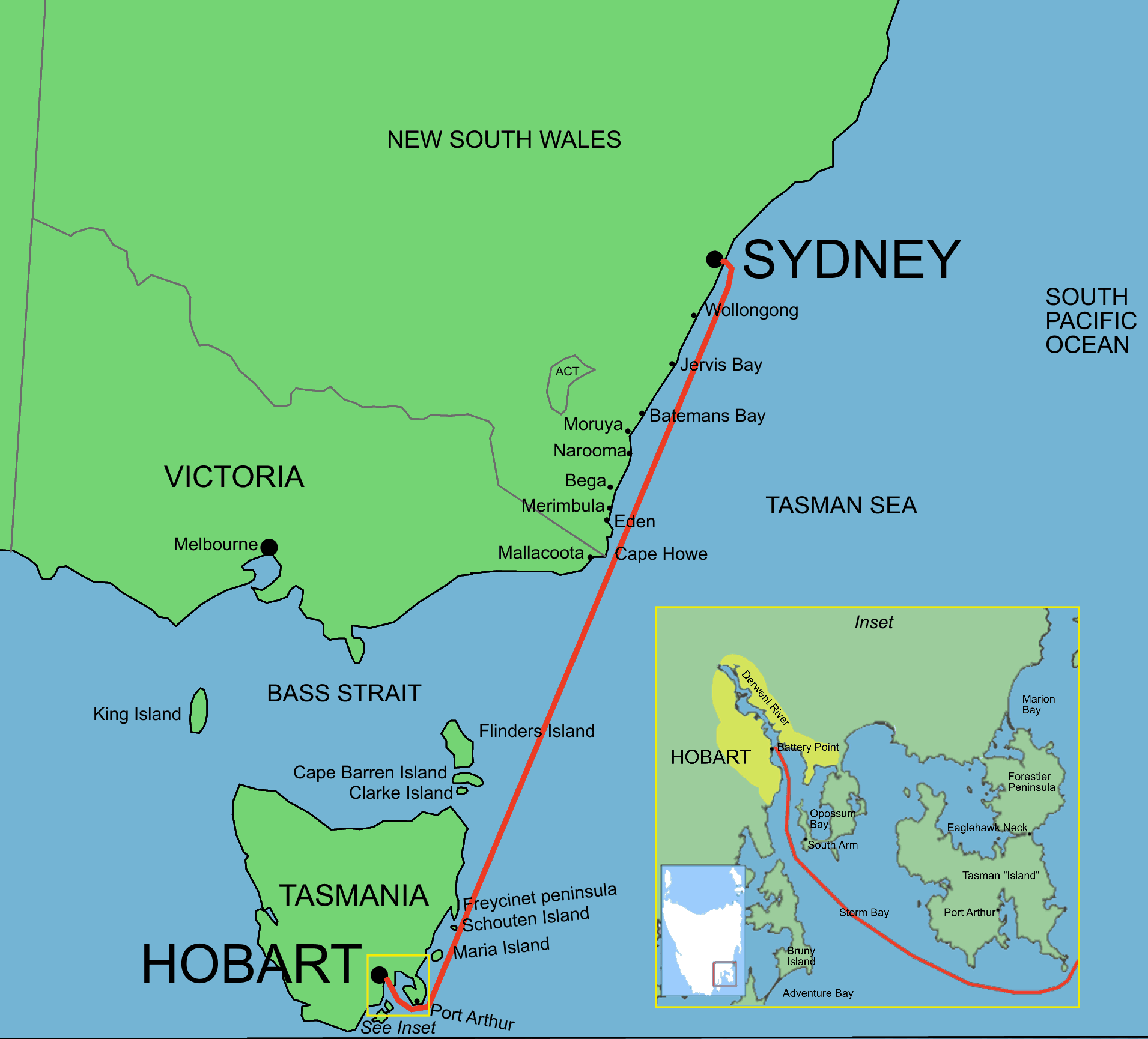

Event information
- Type: Yacht
- Dates: 26–31 December 1992
- Sponsor: Kodak
- Host city: Sydney, Hobart
- Boats: 110
- Distance: 628 nautical miles (1,163 km)
- Website: Rolex Sydney Hobart

Results
- Winner (1992): New Zealand Endeavour (Grant Dalton)

Succession
- Previous: Brindabella (George Snow) in 1991
- Next: Ninety Seven (Andrew Strachan) in 1993

The 1992 Sydney to Hobart Yacht Race, sponsored by Kodak, was the 48th annual running of the "blue water classic" Sydney to Hobart Yacht Race. As in past editions of the race, it was hosted by the Cruising Yacht Club of Australia based in Sydney, New South Wales. As with previous Sydney to Hobart Yacht Races, the 1992 edition began on Sydney Harbour, at noon on Boxing Day (26 December 1992), before heading south for 630 nautical miles (1,170 km) through the Tasman Sea, past Bass Strait, into Storm Bay and up the River Derwent, to cross the finish line in Hobart, Tasmania.

The 1992 fleet comprised 110 starters of which 102 completed the race and 8 yachts retired.

== Results ==
=== Line Honours results (Top 10) ===
| Position | Sail number | Yacht | State/Country | Yacht type | LOA (Metres) | Skipper | Elapsed time d:hh:mm:ss | Ref |
|---|---|---|---|---|---|---|---|---|
| 1 | KZ 1 | New Zealand Endeavour | New Zealand | Farr Maxi Ketch | 26.00 | Grant Dalton | 2:19:19:18 | |
| 2 | 8888 | Amazon | New South Wales | Steinman Pocket Maxi | 20.70 | Peter Walker | 2:22:41:22 | |
| 3 | KZ 6717 | Kodak Express | New Zealand | Elliott 17 | 17.00 | Ian Margan | 3:01:11:52 | |
| 4 | 5444 | Bobsled-Société Générale | Queensland | Steinman Pocket Maxi | 20.10 | Kerry Spencer | 3:01:21:37 | |
| 5 | C1 | Brinabella | Australian Capital Territory | Farr Pocket Maxi | 19.60 | George Snow | 3:01:40:03 | |
| 6 | KB 80 | Condor | New South Wales | Holland Maxi | 24.50 | Anthony Paola | 3:01:49:39 | |
| 7 | M 250 | Morning Mist III | (Victoria (state)) Victoria | Farr 50 IMS | 14.00 | Alfred Neate | 3:03:30:26 | |
| 8 | 70 | Ragamuffin | New South Wales | Farr 50 | 15.20 | Syd Fischer | 3:06:35:37 | |
| 9 | M 16 | Oz Fire | New South Wales | Mummery 45 | 13.70 | Douglas Coulter | 3:07:29:07 | |
| 10 | 5222 | Freight Train | New South Wales | Frers Pocket Maxi | 18.90 | Damien Parkes | 3:08:30:39 | |

=== Handicap results (Top 10) ===
==== IMS Division ====
| Position | Sail number | Yacht | State/Country | Yacht type | LOA (Metres) | Skipper | Corrected time d:hh:mm:ss | Ref |
|---|---|---|---|---|---|---|---|---|
| 1 | 9999 | Assassin | New South Wales | Farr 40 IMS | 12.10 | Robin Crawford | 2:15:44:57 | |
| 2 | M 250 | Morning Mist III | (Victoria (state)) Victoria | Farr 50 IMS | 14.00 | Alfred Neate | 2:16:47:26 | |
| 3 | J 4737 | Zero III | Japan | Elliott 12 IMS | 12.10 | Shigetaka Tsumura | 2:18:07:14 | |
| 4 | M 16 | Oz Fire | New South Wales | Mummery 45 | 13.70 | Douglas Coulter | 2:18:08:31 | |
| 5 | A 33 | Invincible | Tasmania | Farr 1104 | 11.00 | Harold & June Clark | 2:18:14:40 | |
| 6 | 5223 | Ryobi | New South Wales | Juston NS-X 36 | 11.60 | Ron Jacobs | 2:18:26:07 | |
| 7 | KZ 6572 | Icefire | New Zealand | Mummery 45 | 13.70 | Peter Taylor | 2:20:18:04 | |
| 8 | B10 | Adria | (Victoria (state)) Victoria | Johnstone J44 | 13.70 | Giorgio Gjergja | 2:20:42:14 | |
| 9 | 3105 | Doctor Who | Tasmania | Davidson 51 | 15.70 | Roger Jackman | 2:20:46:58 | |
| 10 | R 4233 | Mobile Net Cotton Blossom | (Victoria (state)) Victoria | Farr 55 | 16.70 | Eddie Barron | 2:21:02:17 | |

==== IOR Division ====
| Position | Sail number | Yacht | State/Country | Yacht type | LOA (Metres) | Skipper | Corrected time d:hh:mm:ss | Ref |
|---|---|---|---|---|---|---|---|---|
| 1 | 70 | Ragamuffin | New South Wales | Farr 50 | 15.20 | Syd Fischer | 2:21:21:04 | |
| 2 | KZ 1 | New Zealand Endeavour | New Zealand | Farr Maxi Ketch | 26.00 | Grant Dalton | 2:23:11:09 | |
| 3 | IR 8000 | Atara | (Republic of Ireland) Ireland | Farr 43 | 13.10 | Bill Sykes | 3:00:11:38 | |
| 4 | KA 4000 | Salamanca Inn | Tasmania | Farr One Tonner | 12.10 | John Fuglsang | 3:00:25:26 | |
| 5 | R 33 | JLW Chutzpah | (Victoria (state)) Victoria | Davidson 34 | 10.20 | Bruce Taylor | 3:01:48:32 | |
| 6 | A 40 | Intrigue | Tasmania | Castro One Tonner | 12.20 | Donald Calvert | 3:02:03:54 | |
| 7 | 4117 | Sheraton Hobart | Tasmania | Farr 40 | 12.20 | Ian Smith | 3:02:10:56 | |
| 8 | 4343 | Wild Oats | New South Wales | Farr 43 | 13.10 | Bruce Foye; Roger Hickman; Lance Peckman | 3:02:17:46 | |
| 9 | 621 | King Cross | New South Wales | Davidson 36 | 10.90 | Ray Stone | 3:02:52:48 | |
| 10 | KA SM2 | Penfold Ultimate Challenge | (Victoria (state)) Victoria | Dubois One Tonner | 12.20 | Lou Abrahams | 3:02:56:07 | |
