= 1991 Sydney to Hobart Yacht Race =

1991 annual yacht race in Australia

47th Sydney to Hobart Yacht Race
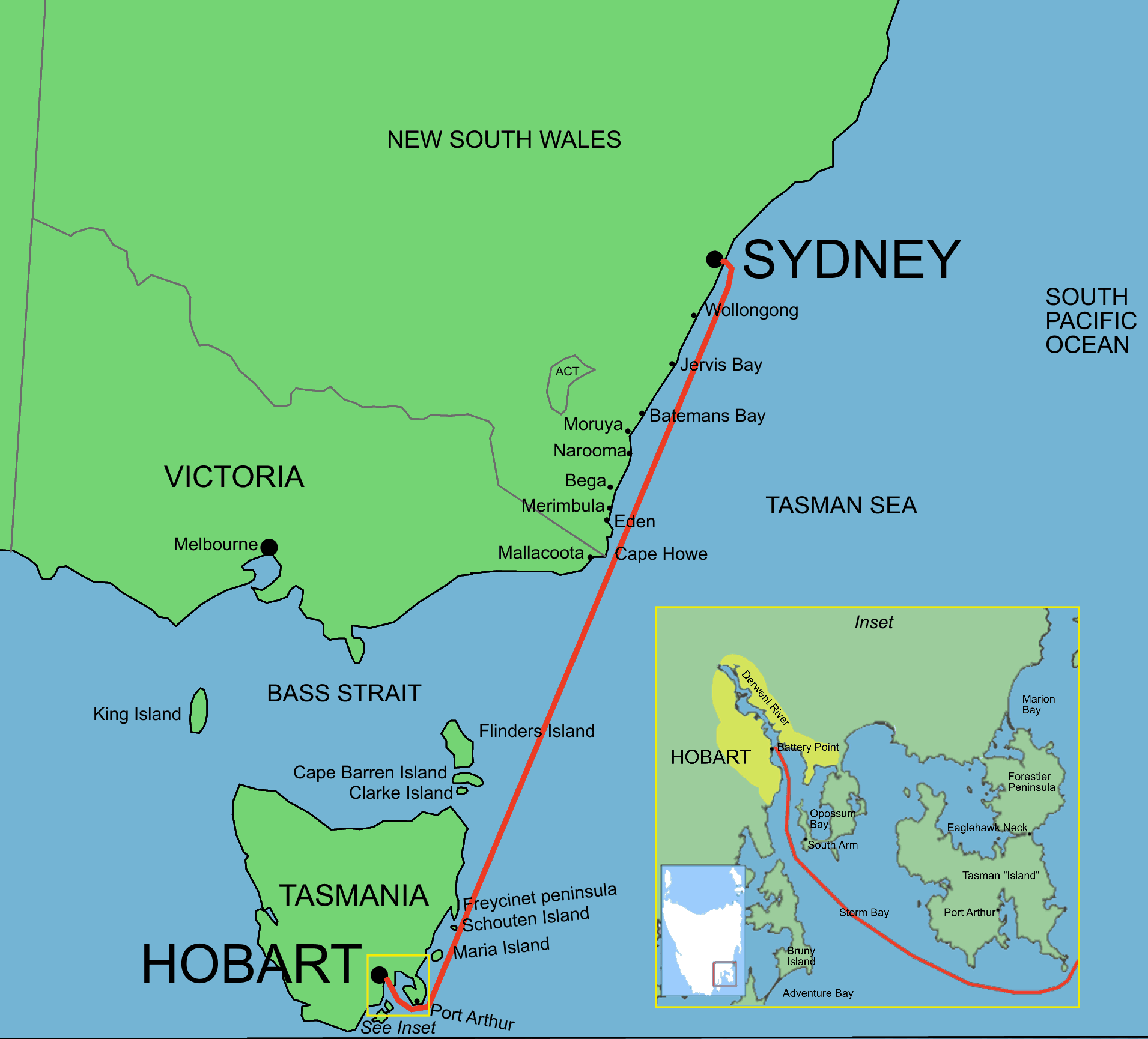

Event information
- Type: Yacht
- Dates: 26–31 December 1991
- Sponsor: Kodak
- Host city: Sydney, Hobart
- Boats: 99
- Distance: 628 nautical miles (1,163 km)
- Website: Rolex Sydney Hobart

Results
- Winner (1991): Brindabella (George Snow)

Succession
- Previous: Ragamuffin (Syd Fischer) in 1990
- Next: New Zealand Endeavour (Grant Dalton) in 1992

The 1991 Sydney to Hobart Yacht Race, sponsored by Kodak, was the 47th annual running of the "blue water classic" Sydney to Hobart Yacht Race. As in past editions of the race, it was hosted by the Cruising Yacht Club of Australia based in Sydney, New South Wales. As with previous Sydney to Hobart Yacht Races, the 1991 edition began on Sydney Harbour, at noon on Boxing Day (26 December 1991), before heading south for 630 nautical miles (1,170 km) through the Tasman Sea, past Bass Strait, into Storm Bay and up the River Derwent, to cross the finish line in Hobart, Tasmania.

The 1991 fleet comprised 99 starters of which 91 completed the race and 8 yachts retired.

== Results ==
=== Line Honours results (Top 10) ===
Position	Sail number	Yacht	State/Country	Yacht type	LOA (Metres)	Skipper	Elapsed time d:hh:mm:ss	Ref
1	C1	Brinabella	Australian Capital Territory	Farr Pocket Maxi	19.60	George Snow	3:01:14:09	
2	7	Hammer of Queensland	Queensland	Steinman Pocket Maxi	20.51	Arthur Bloore	3:02:30:56	
3	KA 1400	Apollo	Queensland	Lexcen Maxi	24.00	Vincent D'Emilio	3:04:51:00	
4	5444	2UE-Mitre 10	New South Wales	Steinman Pocket Maxi	20.12	Peter Sorenson	3:05:01:25	
5	SA 93	Helsal II	South Australia	Adams Pocket Maxi	20.03	Keith Flint	3:05:32:23	
6	5600	Rager	New South Wales	Elliott Pocket Maxi	17.00	Willi Knobelspies	3:06:09:51	
7	262	Helsal III	New South Wales	Adams Pocket Maxi	20.00	James Yonge	3:06:49:24	
8	KZ 6572	Icefire	New Zealand	Mummery 45	13.70	Peter Taylor	3:06:57:35	
9	M 16	Oz Fire	New South Wales	Mummery 45	13.70	Douglas Coulter	3:07:46:38	
10	5222	Freight Train	New South Wales	Frers Pocket Maxi	18.82	Damien Parkes	3:09:29:00	

=== Handicap results (Top 10) ===
==== IMS Division ====
Position	Sail number	Yacht	State/Country	Yacht type	LOA (Metres)	Skipper	Corrected time d:hh:mm:ss	Ref
1	4527	She's Apples II	New South Wales	King Jarkan 12.5	12.73	David Strong	2:21:15:03	
2	RQ 144	Phoenix	Queensland	Johnstone J44	13.70	Stephen Everett	2:21:44:55	
3	M 16	Oz Fire	New South Wales	Mummery 45	13.70	Douglas Coulter	2:22:56:03	
4	KZ 6572	Icefire	New Zealand	Mummery 45	13.70	Peter Taylor	2:23:07:56	
5	3105	Doctor Who	Tasmania	Davidson 51	15.70	Roger Jackman	2:23:29:11	
6	3663	Northwest Airlines	New South Wales	Holland Two Tonner	12.80	Robert Steel	3:00:52:04	
7	B 23	Kingurra	(Victoria (state)) Victoria	Joubert 43 Cruiser-Racer	13.01	Peter Joubert	3:01:17:40	
8	1137	Fascination III	Tasmania	Dubois One Tonner	12.14	Andrew Blakney	3:01:28:36	
9	4715	Never A Dull Moment	New South Wales	King Jarkan 12.5	12.50	Colin Wilson	3:01:41:28	
10	1979	Vendetta	New Zealand	Giles Moody 44	13.04	Charles Reid	3:01:48:30	

==== IOR Division ====
Position	Sail number	Yacht	State/Country	Yacht type	LOA (Metres)	Skipper	Corrected time d:hh:mm:ss	Ref
1	IR 8000	Atara	(Republic of Ireland) Ireland	Farr 43	13.10	Harold Cudmore; John Storey	2:20:05:11	
2	KA SM2	Ultimate Challenge	(Victoria (state)) Victoria	Dubois One Tonner	12.20	Lou Abrahams	2:20:07:01	
3	400	Sanctuary Cove Queensland Maid	Queensland	Farr One Tonner	12.20	Robert Robertson	2:20:15:44	
4	KA 4000	Salamanca Inn	Tasmania	Farr One Tonner	12.10	John Fuglsang	2:21:10:23	
5	4440	Another Concubine	New South Wales	Farr One Tonner	12.22	John Parker	2:21:16:27	
6	4117	Sheraton Hobart	Tasmania	Farr 40 One Tonner	12.20	Ian Smith	2:21:45:47	
7	A 40	Intrigue	Tasmania	Castro One Tonner	12.20	Donald Calvert	2:21:45:52	
8	4918	Nuzulu	New South Wales	Steinman Half Tonner	9.66	Ed Psaltis; Peter Ward	2:22:20:51	
9	4343	Wild Oats	New South Wales	Farr 43	13.10	Bruce Foye; Roger Hickman; Lance Peckman	2:22:25:25	
10	F 611	Emeco Once A Jolly Swagman	Western Australia	Davidson One Tonner	12.12	Alan Brierty	2:22:32:23	
