= Peter van Niekerk =

Dutch sailor (born 1971)

Personal information
- Full name: Petrus Reininus Johannes van Niekerk
- Nationality: Dutch
- Born: 30 November 1971 (age 54) Hazerswoude
- Height: 195 cm (6 ft 5 in)

Sailing career
- Sport: Sailing
- Class(es): Soling; Star; 5.5 Metre
Medal record
Sailing
5.5 Metre World Championships
Gold medal – first place	2001 Glücksburg	5.5m
Silver medal – second place	2006 Medemblik	5.5m
- Updated on 15 February 2014

Petrus Reininus Johannes "Peter" van Niekerk (born 30 November 1971 in Hazerswoude) is a sailor from the Netherlands, who represented his country for the first time at the 2000 Summer Olympics in Sydney. With Roy Heiner as helmsman and Dirk de Ridder as fellow crew member, Van Niekerk took the 4th place in the Soling. In the 2004 Olympics in Athena Van Niekerk made his second Olympic appearance. This time in the Star with Mark Neeleman as helmsman. They took 14th place.

In 1997–98, he was a crewmember on Volvo 60 yacht Brunel Sunergy in the Whitbread Round the World Race and in 2008–09 on yacht Delta Lloyd in the Volvo Ocean Race.

He sailed for ALL4ONE Challenge in the 2010 Louis Vuitton Trophy Dubai.
