= 1995 Sydney to Hobart Yacht Race =

1995 annual yacht race in Australia

51st Sydney to Hobart Yacht Race
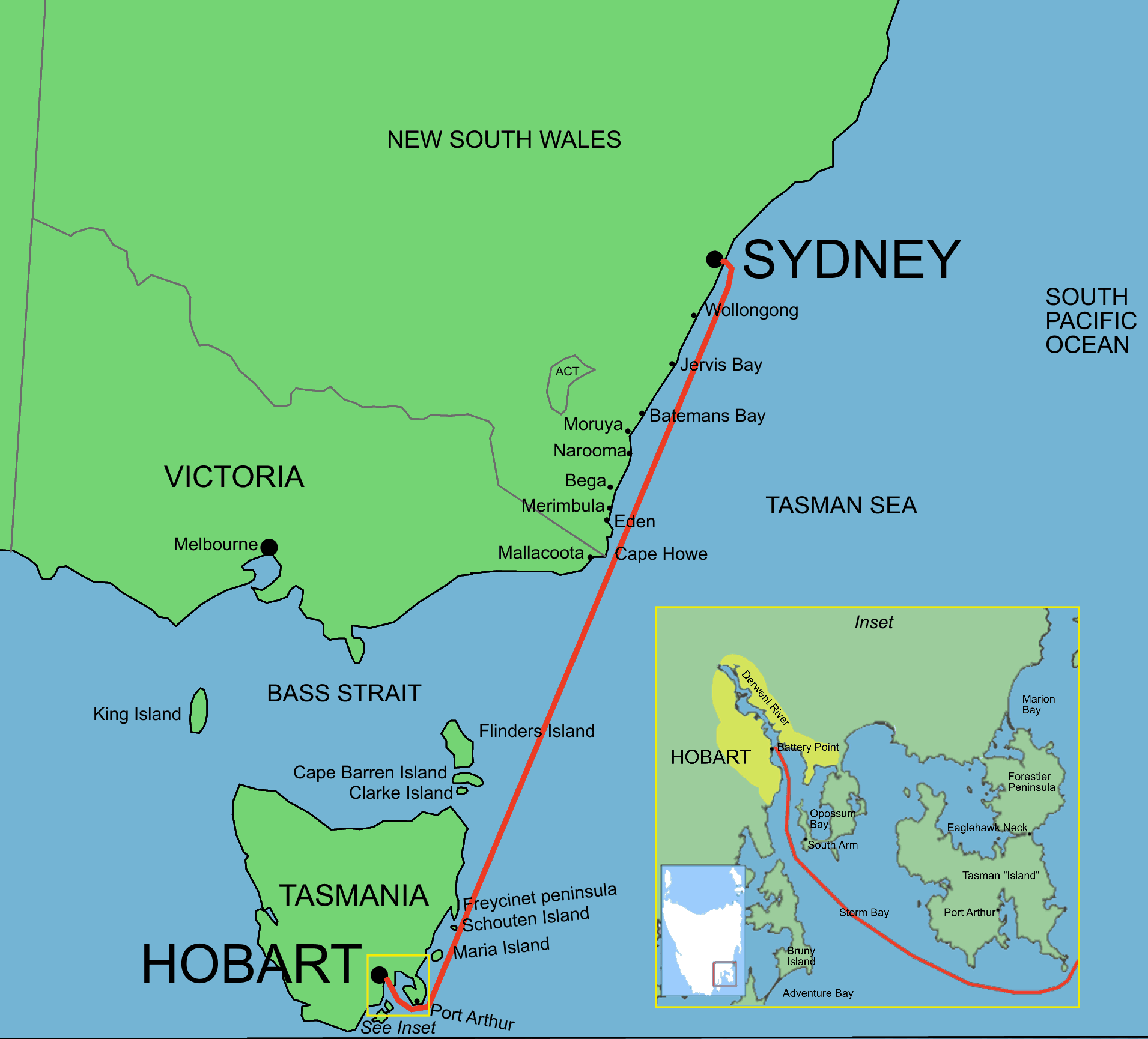

Event information
- Type: Yacht
- Dates: 26 December 1995 - 3 January 1996
- Sponsor: Telstra
- Host city: Sydney, Hobart
- Boats: 98
- Distance: 628 nautical miles (1,163 km)
- Website: Rolex Sydney Hobart

Results
- Winner (1995): Sayonara (Larry Ellison)

Succession
- Previous: Tasmania (Robert Clifford) in 1994
- Next: Morning Glory (Hasso Plattner) in 1996

The 1995 Sydney to Hobart Yacht Race, sponsored by Telstra, was the 51st annual running of the "blue water classic" Sydney to Hobart Yacht Race. As in past editions of the race, it was hosted by the Cruising Yacht Club of Australia based in Sydney, New South Wales. As with previous Sydney to Hobart Yacht Races, the 1995 edition began on Sydney Harbour, at noon on Boxing Day (26 December 1995), before heading south for 630 nautical miles (1,170 km) through the Tasman Sea, past Bass Strait, into Storm Bay and up the River Derwent, to cross the finish line in Hobart, Tasmania.

The 1995 fleet comprised 98 starters of which 92 completed the race and 6 yachts retired.

== Results ==
=== Line Honours results (Top 10) ===
| Position | Sail number | Yacht | State/Country | Yacht type | LOA (Metres) | Skipper | Elapsed time d:hh:mm:ss | Ref |
|---|---|---|---|---|---|---|---|---|
| 1 | US17 | Sayonara | United States | Farr ILC Maxi | 23.80 | Larry Ellison | 3:00:53:35 | |
| 2 | C1 | Brindabella | New South Wales | Jutson 75 Maxi | 22.85 | George Snow | 3:02:53:59 | |
| 3 | 8888 | Foxtel Amazon | New South Wales | Steinman Pocket Maxi | 20.75 | Peter Walker | 3:04:54:39 | |
| 4 | 8388 | Fudge | New South Wales | Cook Edmunds Duncan Maxi | 25.80 | Anton Starling | 3:05:48:56 | |
| 5 | 70 | Ragamuffin | New South Wales | Farr 51 | 15.40 | Syd Fischer | 3:09:38:04 | |
| 6 | SM 250 | Bartercard Morning Mist III | (Victoria (state)) Victoria | Farr IMS 50 | 15.70 | Alfred Neate | 3:11:36:21 | |
| 7 | 5474 | Infinity III | New South Wales | Farr Pocket Maxi | 19.70 | Martin James | 3:11:36:37 | |
| 8 | AUS 9797 | Ninety Seven | New South Wales | Farr 47 | 14.30 | Andrew Strachan | 3:13:00:35 | |
| 9 | B1 | Ausmaid | (Victoria (state)) Victoria | Farr IMS 47 | 14.24 | Giorgio Gjergja | 3:13:03:18 | |
| 10 | SA 93 | Helsal II | South Australia | Adams Pocket Maxi | 20.00 | Keith Flint | 3:14:04:09 | |

=== Handicap results (Top 10) ===
| Position | Sail number | Yacht | State/Country | Yacht type | LOA (Metres) | Skipper | Corrected time d:hh:mm:ss | Implied Wind Calculation | Ref |
|---|---|---|---|---|---|---|---|---|---|
| 1 | R 4100 | Terra Firma | (Victoria (state)) Victoria | Murray 41 IMS Racer | 12.50 | Scott Carlile; Dean Wilson | 3:10:22:36 | 12.7282 | |
| 2 | 9090 | Quest | New South Wales | Nelson Marek 43 | 13.00 | Bob Steel | 3:10:30:18 | 12.6645 | |
| 3 | 5597 | Stewart Toyota | New South Wales | Bashford BH41 | 12.50 | Ray Roberts | 3:15:36:12 | 12.3004 | |
| 4 | YC 498 | Maglieri Wines | South Australia | Jutson 42 | 12.90 | Geoffrey Vercoe | 3:11:43:18 | 12.0927 | |
| 5 | 9999 | Assassin | New South Wales | Farr 40 IMS | 12.10 | Robin Crawford | 3:11:45:20 | 12.0798 | |
| 6 | 38 | Southerly | New South Wales | Peel 35 | 10.60 | Don Mickleborough | 4:07:58:28 | 11.8846 | |
| 7 | 70 | Ragamuffin | New South Wales | Farr 51 | 15.40 | Syd Fischer | 3:12:11:52 | 11.8837 | |
| 8 | IR 8000 | Atara | (Republic of Ireland) Ireland | Lyons IMS 41 | 13.00 | John Storey | 3:12:23:06 | 11.8036 | |
| 9 | 4343 | AMP Wild Oats | New South Wales | Farr 43 | 13.10 | Bruce Foye | 3:12:24:48 | 11.7917 | |
| 10 | AUS 9797 | Ninety Seven | New South Wales | Farr 47 | 14.30 | Andrew Strachan | 3:12:32:11 | 11.7398 | |
