= 1994 Sydney to Hobart Yacht Race =

1994 annual yacht race in Australia

50th Sydney to Hobart Yacht Race
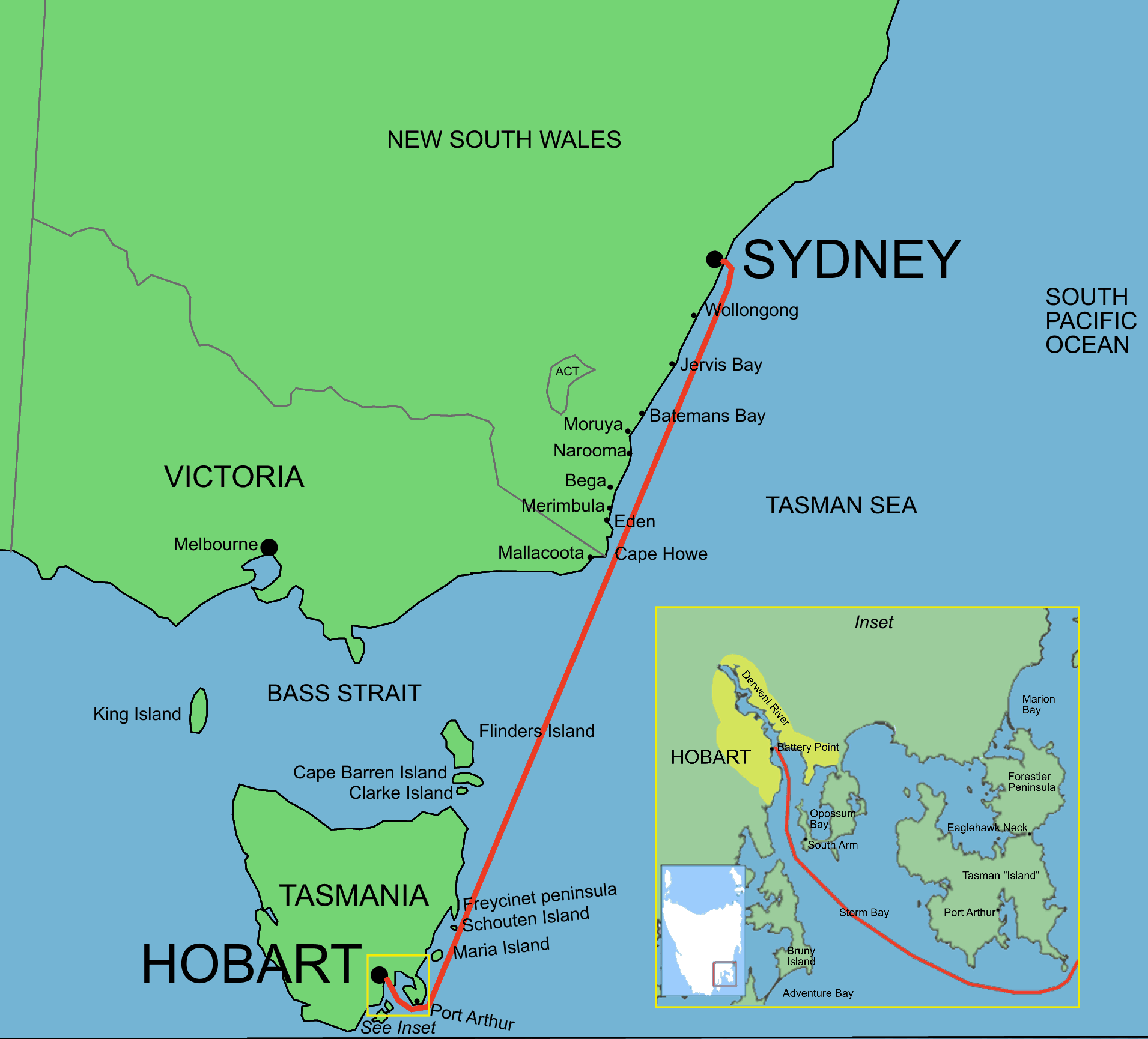

Event information
- Type: Yacht
- Dates: 26 December 1994 - 3 January 1995
- Sponsor: Kodak Gold
- Host city: Sydney, Hobart
- Boats: 371
- Distance: 628 nautical miles (1,163 km)
- Website: Rolex Sydney Hobart

Results
- Winner (1994): Tasmania (Robert Clifford)

Succession
- Previous: Ninety Seven (Andrew Strachan) in 1993
- Next: Sayonara (Larry Ellison) in 1995

The 1994 Sydney to Hobart Yacht Race, sponsored by Kodak Gold, was the 50th annual running of the "blue water classic" Sydney to Hobart Yacht Race. As in past editions of the race, it was hosted by the Cruising Yacht Club of Australia based in Sydney, New South Wales. As with previous Sydney to Hobart Yacht Races, the 1994 edition began on Sydney Harbour, at noon on Boxing Day (26 December 1994), before heading south for 630 nautical miles (1,170 km) through the Tasman Sea, past Bass Strait, into Storm Bay and up the River Derwent, to cross the finish line in Hobart, Tasmania.

The 1994 fleet comprised 371 starters of which 308 completed the race and 63 yachts retired.

== Results ==
=== Line Honours results (Top 10) ===
Position	Sail number	Yacht	State/Country	Yacht type	LOA (Metres)	Skipper	Elapsed time d:hh:mm:ss	Ref
1	T1	Tasmania	Tasmania	Farr Whitbread Maxi	25.73	Robert Clifford	2:16:48:04	
2	C1	Brindabella	New South Wales	Jutson 75 Maxi	22.85	George Snow	2:16:55:15	
3	HKG 88	Exile	Hong Kong	Reichel Pugh Pocket Maxi	20.00	Warwick Millar	2:18:15:03	
4	US 7177	Sorcery	United States	Mull Maxi	25.10	Jake Wood	2:19:59:35	
5	G 4152	Epsom Broomstick	New South Wales	Simonis Maxi	21.30	Anthony Beilby	2:21:00:31	
6	7	Hammer of Queensland	Queensland	Steinmann Maxi	22.50	Arthur Bloore	2:21:30:20	
7	K 1611R	Longobarda	Tasmania	Farr Maxi	24.30	David Stephenson	2:21:58:02	
8	6060	Volkswagen Sailability	(Victoria (state)) Victoria	Swarbrick Whitbread 60	19.81	Roger McKenzie	2:23:38:42	
9	USA 6	Congere	United States	Pedrick Maxi	25.10	Bevin Koeppel	3:00:25:27	
10	KB 80	Condor of Currabubula	New South Wales	Holland Maxi	24.30	Tony Paola	3:01:13:27	

=== Handicap results (Top 10) ===
Position	Sail number	Yacht	State/Country	Yacht type	LOA (Metres)	Skipper	Corrected time d:hh:mm:ss	Ref
1	GER 4411	Raptor	Germany	Murray 41	12.40	Andreas Eichenauer	2:11:41:00	
2	AUS 9797	Ninety Seven	New South Wales	Farr 47	14.30	Andrew Strachan	2:13:23:09	
3	B 214	Indec Prime Example	(Victoria (state)) Victoria	Davidson 52	15.80	David Gotze	2:13:38:49	
4	B 1	Ausmaid	(Victoria (state)) Victoria	Farr IMS 47	14.40	Giorgio Gjergja	2:13:39:26	
5	NZL 6006	Thai Airways International Starlight Express	New Zealand	Davidson 55	16.70	Chris Packer	2:14:01:58	
6	294	Love & War	New South Wales	Sparkman & Stephens S&S 47	14.20	Peter Kurts	2:14:05:27	
7	HKG 88	Exile	Hong Kong	Reichel Pugh Pocket Maxi	20.00	Warwick Millar	2:14:41:45	
8	R 3333	Atria	(Victoria (state)) Victoria	Ford IMS 30	9.00	Gilbert Ford	2:15:00:38	
9	R 33	JLW Chutzpah	(Victoria (state)) Victoria	Hick 35	10.50	Bruce Taylor	2:15:07:02	
10	6336	2KY Racing Radio	New South Wales	Jutson NSX 36	10.80	Bob Mulkearns	2:15:14:23	
