= Kelvin Harrap =

New Zealand sailor

Kelvin Harrap (born 1970) is a New Zealand sailor who has represented his country at the Summer Olympics and sailed in multiple America's Cups and Volvo Ocean Races.

Harrap was born 1970 in Napier, New Zealand. He sailed the 1993–94 Whitbread Round the World Race as part of the crew on Chris Dickson's Tokio before joining his Tag Heuer Challenge team at the 1995 Louis Vuitton Cup.

Harrap represented New Zealand at the 1996 Summer Olympics, sailing a Soling with Sean Clarkson and Jamie Gale. The team finished 14th in the fleet race competition.

Harrap again joined Dickson for the 1997–98 Whitbread Round the World Race, this time on Toshiba. He then joined the America True syndicate for the 2000 Louis Vuitton Cup. He was then part of the One World Challenge for the 2003 Louis Vuitton Cup before joining Team New Zealand for the 2007 America's Cup.

He sailed for Ken Read's Puma Ocean Racing on Mar Mostro in the 2011–12 Volvo Ocean Race. He sailed with Read, Daryl Wislang, Warwick Fleury and James Spithill on board Comanche in the 2015 Sydney to Hobart Yacht Race.
