= Chris Ward (sailor) =

New Zealand sailor

Chris Ward is a New Zealand sailor.

He sailed in the 1992 Louis Vuitton Cup with New Zealand Challenge. He then sailed on Toshiba during the 1997–98 Whitbread Round the World Race.

Ward then joined Team New Zealand in 1995 he then sailed as a grinder in the 2000 America's Cup, America's Cup 2003 and 2007 America's Cups.

He sailed in the Louis Vuitton Trophy regattas and TP52 Audi MedCup with Team New Zealand. He was lost overboard during a 2013 Louis Vuitton Cup race. He was a grinder on board Aotearoa when it lost the 2013 America's Cup.

His contract was not renewed following the 2013 event and he subsequently re-trained as a teacher.

Ward now teaches at Rosmini College.
