= Dirk de Ridder (sailor) =

Dutch sailor (born 1972)

Personal information
- Born: 29 December 1972 (age 53) Oudewater, Netherlands
- Height: 1.87 m (6.1 ft)

Sailing career
- Sport: Sailing
- Class: Soling

Dirk de Ridder (born 29 December 1972) is a Dutch sailor.

Born in Oudewater, Netherlands, he represented his country at the 2000 Summer Olympics in Sydney. With Roy Heiner as helmsman and Peter van Niekerk as fellow crew member, they took the fourth place in the Soling event.

He has sailed in four editions of the Volvo Ocean Race, in 1997–98 on Merit Cup, 2001–02 on the winning Illbruck Challenge, in 2005–06 on Pirates of the Caribbean and in 2014–15 on Team Brunel.

He was a member of Oracle Racing on USA 17 in the 2010 America's Cup. He sailed for the 2011–13 America's Cup World Series but was banned from the 2013 America's Cup due to being a part of Oracle's cheating during the World Series. De Ridder maintained his innocence, and his original five-year ban was reduced to 18 months on appeal. He was part of the winning crew for the 2022 6-metre class World Championships.
