= Ray Davies (sailor) =

New Zealand sailor

Ramon "Ray" Davies is a New Zealand sailor who has competed in multiple Volvo Ocean Races and America's Cups. His career as a professional sailor has lasted over 23 years including 16 years in the Team New Zealand fulfilling a variety of roles like helmsman, designer, strategist and even as the coach of the New Zealand team.

Davies was on the second-placed Merit Cup in the 1997–98 Whitbread Round the World Race. He then sailed with America One in the 2000 Louis Vuitton Cup, before helming the winning Illbruck Challenge in the 2001–02 Volvo Ocean Race. He joined Team New Zealand as a part of their weather team for the 2003 America's Cup. He was a member of New Zealand's afterguard for both the 2007 and 2013 America's Cups and backup helmsman for the 2017 America's Cup.

He has been a member of the Mean Machine sailing team since 1999.
