= BIL (yacht) =

- Class: Ericsson 80
- Designer(s): Bruce Farr

Racing career
- Skippers: Ross Field
- Notable victories: 1997 Fastnet Race (l.h.)

BIL is a 24.5 metres (80 ft) Ericsson 80 yacht.

== Career ==
BIL won the Fastnet Race line honours in 1997 with skipper Ross Field, Matthew Humphries, Halvard Mabire and Michel Lefebvre, Jr.
