= Farr Maxi One Design =

Sailboat type

Hull
- LOA: 24.5 m (80 ft)

Farr Maxi One Design (formerly Grand Mistral 80, Ericsson 80) is a 24.5 metres (80 ft) one-design yacht designed by Bruce Farr. The type was originally developed as the Grand Mistral 80 for Pierre Fehlmann with the intention of creating a one-design round-the-world race. Five yachts were originally built.

They sailed the Adecco World Championships in 1999, a total of eight yachts competing including skippers Ernesto Bertarelli, Hans Bouscholte, Ross Field, Guido Maisto, Geoffrey Meek, Gunnar Krantz, Ludde Ingvall, Jules Mazars.

== Yachts ==
- Nicorette

AnemosII Weddel Idrusa Ushuaia
