= 1997–1998 Whitbread Round the World Race =

1997–98 Whitbread Round the World Race
Event title
- Edition: 7th
- Yachts: Whitbread 60

Competitors
- Competitors: 10

Results
- Winner: EF Language

The 1997–98 Whitbread Round the World Race was the seventh edition of the around-the-world sailing event Whitbread Round the World Race. The Whitbread Round the World Race ran for the first time with all W60 boats and to a "points vs time" (instead of aggregate leg time) scoring system to enhance the value of the shorter race legs.

Also, in an effort to attract additional media coverage, the Whitbread race committee divided the race into no less than 9 legs for the 1997 to 1998 race, therefore increasing the number of ports visited.

Volvo had its first major association with the race in 1997 to 1998 by sponsoring the trophy (thus the race was officially known as the Whitbread 'round the world race for the Volvo Trophy) and some of the media coverage. For the first time running to W60-only specification, this year's Whitbread attracted just 10 entries—the fewest to date.

== Participants ==
Boat	Nation	Designer	Skipper
America's Challenge	United States	Alan Andrews	(United States) Ross Field
Brunel Sunergy	Netherlands	Judel/Vrolijk	(Netherlands) Roy Heiner
Chessie Racing	United States	Farr Yacht Design	(United States) George Collins
EF Education	Sweden	Farr Yacht Design	(France) Christine Guillou
EF Language	Sweden	Farr Yacht Design	(United States) Paul Cayard
Innovation Kvaerner	Norway	Farr Yacht Design	(Norway) Knut Frostad
Merit Cup	Monaco	Farr Yacht Design	(New Zealand) Grant Dalton
Silk Cut	United Kingdom	Farr Yacht Design	(United Kingdom) Lawrie Smith
Swedish Match	Sweden	Farr Yacht Design	(Sweden) Gunnar Krantz
Toshiba	United States	Farr Yacht Design	(United States) Dennis Conner (United Kingdom) Paul Standbridge

=== America's Challenge ===
Led by Neil Barth and skippered by Ross Field, the team bought Yamaha before building America's Challenge. The team struggled for funding and withdrew from the race in Cape Town. The crew included a group of New Zealanders, including Jared Henderson, and the UK's Matthew Humphries.

=== Brunel Sunergy ===
Skippered for the first six legs by Hans Bouscholte, the crew included Gerald Rogivue and Peter van Niekerk. Because of bad results, Hans Bouscholte was replaced by the Team director Roy Heiner in the last three legs.

=== Chessie Racing ===
Skippered by 57-year-old George Collins, the crew included John Kostecki, Juan Vila, Gavin Brady and Ken Read.

=== EF Education and EF Language ===
EF Language was skippered by Paul Cayard and included a core crew from his AmericaOne challenge for the 2000 America's Cup. Lawrie Smith was originally intended to lead the boat, until transferring to Silk Cut. The crew included Steven Erickson and Magnus Olsson

The team's second boat, EF Education, had an all-female crew and was led by French woman Christine Guillou and included Isabelle Autissier. Leslie Egnot joined the crew on leg 4.

=== Innovation Kvaerner ===
Skippered by Knut Frostad, the crew included Marcel van Triest, Ross Halcrow, Tony Rae, Ed Baird, Torben Grael and Pierre Mas.

=== Merit Cup ===
Merit Cup was a Monaco flagged boat skippered by Grant Dalton. One of only two team's that built two boats, the crew included watch captain Kevin Shoebridge, Ian Stewart, Mike Sanderson, Jeremy Lomas, Dirk de Ridder, Ray Davies and Mike Quilter.

=== Silk Cut ===
Led by Lawrie Smith, Silk Cut was the last boat in the fleet designed by Bruce Farr. The crew included Jez Fanstone, Neil Graham, Gordon Maguire, Neal McDonald, Jan Dekker and Stu Bannatyne.

=== Swedish Match ===
Swedish Match was skippered by Gunnar Krantz and included Roger Nilson and Erle Williams. Matthew Humphries joined the crew following the withdrawal of America's Challenge.

=== Toshiba ===
Led by Dennis Conner and Paul Standbridge, Toshiba was originally skippered by Chris Dickson but Dickson was fired after Leg 1. Other crew members included Ross MacDonald, Murray Ross, Chris Ward, Alan Smith and Kelvin Harrap.

The crew had 13 Whitbread and 28 America's Cup campaigns between them.

== Route ==
Ports visited

Event	Start date	Start	Finish	Distance (nmi)
Leg 1	21 September 1997	(United Kingdom) Southampton	(South Africa) Cape Town	7,340
Leg 2	11 November 1997	(South Africa) Cape Town	(Australia) Fremantle	4,600
Leg 3	13 December 1997	(Australia) Fremantle	(Australia) Sydney	2,250
Leg 4	4 January 1998	(Australia) Sydney	(New Zealand) Auckland	1,270
Leg 5	1 February 1998	(New Zealand) Auckland	(Brazil) São Sebastião	6,670
Leg 6	14 March 1998	(Brazil) São Sebastião	(United States) Fort Lauderdale	4,750
Leg 7	19 April 1998	(United States) Fort Lauderdale	(United States) Baltimore	870
Leg 8	3 May 1998	(United States) Baltimore	(France) La Rochelle	3,390
Leg 9	22 May 1998	(France) La Rochelle	(United Kingdom) Southampton	450

== Leg Results ==
#	Boat	Leg 1 (United Kingdom) (South Africa)	Leg 2 (South Africa) (Australia)	Leg 3 (Australia) (Australia)	Leg 4 (Australia) (New Zealand)	Leg 5 (New Zealand) (Brazil)	Leg 6 (Brazil) (United States)	Leg 7 (United States) (United States)	Leg 8 (United States) (France)	Leg 9 (France) (United Kingdom)	Total
1	EF Language	125	72	105	70	135	101	81	55	92	836
2	Merit Cup	110	48	70	105	78	66	50	66	105	698
3	Swedish Match	36	125	92	60	91	89	92	44	60	689
4	Innovation Kvaerner	97	110	60	40	65	77	70	33	81	633
5	Silk Cut	84	84	40	50	26; DNF	115	60	101	70	630
6	Chessie Racing	72	60	81	81	105	55	40	89	30	613
7	Toshiba	60	97	50	92	0 DSQ	44	20; PEN	115	50	528
8	Brunel Sunergy	12	24	30	30	119	33	105	22	40	415
9	EF Education	24	36	20	20	26; DNF	22	30	77	20	275
10	America's Challenge	48	0 DNS	0 DNS	0 DNS	0 DNS	0 DNS	0 DNS	0 DNS	0 DNS	48

== Overall Results ==
Pos	Sail Number	Yacht	Country	Yacht Type	LOA (Metres)	Skipper	Points
1	SWE 13000	EF Language	Sweden	Farr Whitbread 60	19.51	Paul Cayard	836
2	MON 700	Merit Cup	Monaco	Farr Whitbread 60	19.51	Grant Dalton	698
3	SWE 2000	Swedish Match	Sweden	Farr Whitbread 60	19.51	Gunnar Krantz	689
4	NOR 2	Innovation Kvaerner	Norway	Farr Whitbread 60	19.51	Knut Frostad	633
5	GBR 1	Silk Cut	(United Kingdom) Great Britain	Farr Whitbread 60	19.51	Lawrie Smith	630
6	USA 60	Chessie Racing	United States	Farr Whitbread 60	19.51	George Collins	613
7	USA 1	Toshiba	United States	Farr Whitbread 60	19.51	Dennis Conner; Chris Dickson; Paul Standbridge	528
8	NED 11	Brunel Sunergy	Netherlands	Judel Vrolijk Whitbread 60	19.51	Hans Bouscholte; Roy Heiner	415
9	SWE 300000	EF Education	Sweden	Farr Whitbread 60	19.51	Christine Guillou	275
10	USA 11	America's Challenge	United States	Andrews Whitbread 60	19.51	Ross Field	48
