= Mean Machine (sailing team) =

Career
- Established: 1985
- Nation: Monaco

Yachts
- Sail no.: Boat name

Mean Machine is the name of the yachts and the sailing team owned by Dutch businessman Peter de Ridder.

The team has a core of crew members who have been with the team for the last 15 years. Alongside de Ridder, at the heart of the Mean Machine team are internationally renowned sailors who also sail in classes such as the America's Cup or the Volvo Ocean Race; Tom Dodson and Ray Davies from New Zealand, and Briton Jules Salter.

== History ==
The Mean Machine team starts sailing in 1985 with the Mean Machine one-tonner. Peter de Ridder and an almost entirely amateur team sail into sixth place in the World Championships of the class in the Spanish Island of Mallorca. Since then, with 22 years of sailing history behind them, Mean Machine have notched up some of the most prestigious World and Continental titles, placing them near the top of the world rankings in the sport.

== Boats ==
The team is well known for its trademark characteristics: over the last few years the boats have all had black hulls, with pink flames rising up the bow.

Name	Design	Builder	Designer	Launched	Brought	Sold	Notes
	One Tonner						
Mean Machine 1	One Tonner			Secondhand			
Mean Machine 2	One Tonner	Neville Hutton (GBR)	Farr Yacht Design	New Build	1987		
Mean Machine 3	J/24						
Mean Machine 4	One Tonner		Judel/Vrolijk				
Mean Machine 5	X-119	X-Yachts	Nils				
Mean Machine 6							
Mean Machine 7							
Mean Machine 8	Dragon						
Mean Machine 9	Mumm 36		Farr Yacht Design				
Mean Machine 10	ILC 46		Judel/Vrolijk				
Mean Machine 11	ILC 40						Sisterships to Pinta
Mean Machine 12	ILC 30						2nd 1998 ILC30 Worlds
Mean Machine 13	Mumm 36		Farr Yacht Design	Secondhand	1999		Actual Mean Machine 9 Refitted
Mean Machine 14	IMX 45	X-Yachts		New	2001	????	
Mean Machine 15	Dragon (keelboat)	Petticrow (GBR)		NEW	2000	2004	
Mean Machine 16	Mumm 36				2003	2006	
Mean Machine 19	Transpac 52	Hakes Marine (NZL)	Judel/Vrolijk	New	2006	2007	
Mean Machine 17	Mumm 30	Ovington Boats (GBR)	Farr Yacht Design				
Mean Machine 18	Maxi Dolphin 65	Maxi Dolphin	Luca Brenta				
Mean Machine 19	Transpac 52	Cooksons (NZL)	Judel/Vrolijk	New	2008	2008	
Mean Machine 20	Volvo 70	Green Marine (GBR)	Farr Yacht Design	Secondhand			

== Achievements ==
Some of their achievements include: 2006 winners of the Breitling MedCup Circuit (pro and amateur categories); third place in the TP 52 Global Championships, celebrated on the Italian island of Sardinia in September 2007.

In Autumn 2007, the team finished building its newest addition - a Farr 40 One-Design, number 21 in the series of Mean Machine competition sailing boats. Winter 2007/08 saw the launch of a new Mean Machine, a TP 52 to replace the one that Peter de Ridder and crew sailed to victory on in the 2006 MedCup circuit.

=== 2007 ===
- Hyéres Trophy - 6th
- 2007 Breitling MedCup - 5th
- TP52 Rolex Global Championship - 3rd
- Trofeo Portugal - 1st on the Overall Classification and also 1st on the Corinthian
- Regatta Breitling - 9th
- Copa del Rey Trophy - 9th
- Trofeo Alicante - 1st in Corinthian and 2nd on the overall classification
- North Sea Regatta - Winner & Record Breaker VO70
- Key West Race Week - 2nd Mumm 30 Class
- Acura Miami Race Week - Winners Mumm 30 Class
- Hublot Palmavela - Winners TP 52 Class

=== 2006 ===
- Winner Miami Race Week Mumm30
- Punta Ala Trophy 2nd TP52 class
- Trofeo Castellon 3rd TP52 class
- Winner Breitling Trophy TP52 class
- Copa del Rey 5th TP52 class
- Winner Athens Trophy TP52 class
- Winner Trofeo Ibiza TP52 Class
- Overall Winner of TP52 Breitling MedCup Circuit
- Mumm30 Worlds 4th overall

For further results see team website Mean Machine
