= 1990 Sydney to Hobart Yacht Race =

1991 annual yacht race in Australia

46th Sydney to Hobart Yacht Race
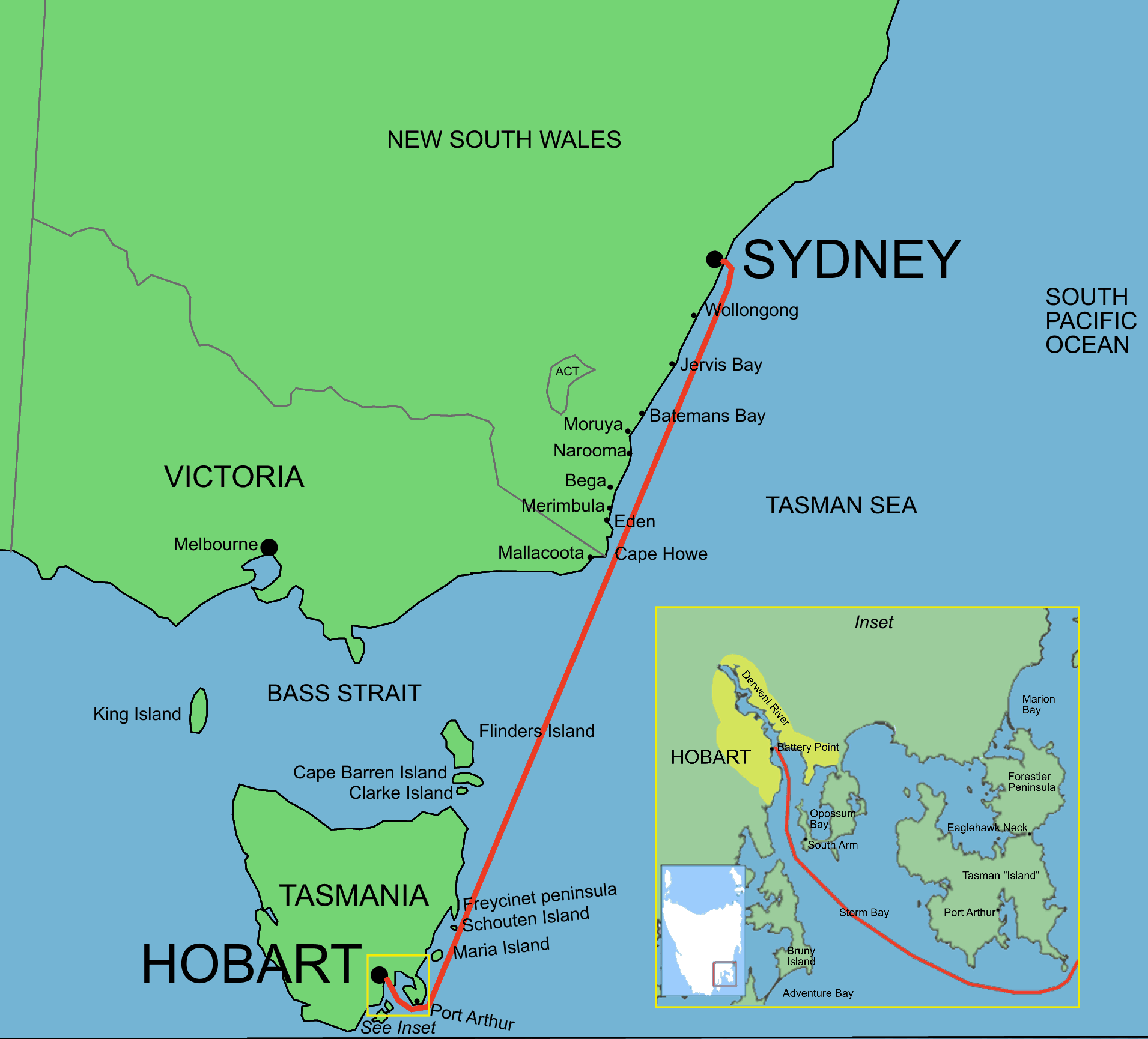

Event information
- Type: Yacht
- Dates: 26 December 1990 - 3 January 1991
- Sponsor: Nortel
- Host city: Sydney, Hobart
- Boats: 105
- Distance: 628 nautical miles (1,163 km)
- Website: Rolex Sydney Hobart

Results
- Winner (1990): Ragamuffin (Syd Fischer)

Succession
- Previous: Drumbeat (Alan Bond & Peter Gilmore) in 1989
- Next: Brindabella (George Snow) in 1991

The 1990 Sydney to Hobart Yacht Race, sponsored by Nortel, was the 46th annual running of the "blue water classic" Sydney to Hobart Yacht Race. As in past editions of the race, it was hosted by the Cruising Yacht Club of Australia based in Sydney, New South Wales. As with previous Sydney to Hobart Yacht Races, the 1990 edition began on Sydney Harbour, at noon on Boxing Day (26 December 1990), before heading south for 630 nautical miles (1,170 km) through the Tasman Sea, past Bass Strait, into Storm Bay and up the River Derwent, to cross the finish line in Hobart, Tasmania.

The 1990 fleet comprised 105 starters of which 86 completed the race and 19 yachts retired.

== Results ==
=== Line Honours results (Top 10) ===
Position	Sail number	Yacht	State/Country	Yacht type	LOA (Metres)	Skipper	Elapsed time d:hh:mm:ss	Ref
1	KA 70	Ragamuffin	New South Wales	Frers Maxi	24.13	Syd Fischer	2:21:05:33	
2	KB 80	Condor	New South Wales	Holland Maxi Sloop	24.50	Anthony Paola	2:21:53:08	
3	KA C1	Brinabella	Australian Capital Territory	Farr Pocket Maxi	19.60	George Snow	2:22:33:07	
4	5444	Bobsled	New South Wales	Steinman ULDB Pocket Maxi	20.12	Geoffrey Bush; Nick Feros	2:23:12:01	
5	7	Hammer of Queensland	Queensland	Steinman Pocket Maxi	20.51	Arthur Bloore	3:02:46:12	
6	SA 93	Helsal II	South Australia	Adams Pocket Maxi	20.03	Keith Flint	3:03:27:50	
7	262	Helsal III	Tasmania	Adams Pocket Maxi	20.00	John Wertheimer	3:04:29:58	
8	B 4233	Cotton Blossom II	(Victoria (state)) Victoria	Farr 55	16.71	Eddie Barren	3:05:42:21	
9	5222	Freight Train	New South Wales	Frers Pocket Maxi	18.82	Damien Parkes	3:06:02:02	
10	3105	Doctor Who	Tasmania	Davidson 51	15.70	Roger Jackman	3:07:23:02	

=== Handicap results (Top 10) ===
Position	Sail number	Yacht	State/Country	Yacht type	LOA (Metres)	Skipper	Corrected time d:hh:mm:ss	Ref
1	KA 4000	Sagacious V	New South Wales	Farr One Tonner	12.08	Gary Appleby	2:19:44:32	
2	R33	Chutzpah	(Victoria (state)) Victoria	Davidson 34	10.20	Bruce Taylor	2:23:18:20	
3	SM 80	Illusion	(Victoria (state)) Victoria	Davidson 34	10.21	Gino Knezic	2:23:18:38	
4	4186	Anduril	New South Wales	Dubois Older One Tonner	11.27	David Kennedy	2:23:29:11	
5	WP 10	Western Port Venture	(Victoria (state)) Victoria	Dubois One Tonner	12.13	Peter Grant	2:23:29:50	
6	MH 9	Fujitsu Dealers	New South Wales	Davidson 36	10.93	John Eyles	2:23:31:37	
7	KA 5500	Beyond Thunderdome	(United Kingdom) Great Britain	Davidson One Tonner	12.20	Peter Wheeler	2:23:53:24	
8	KA C1	Brinabella	Australian Capital Territory	Farr Pocket Maxi	19.60	George Snow	3:00:03:17	
9	K 100	Rothmans	(United Kingdom) Great Britain	Humphreys Maxi	24.39	Lawrie Smith	2:22:55:22^{1}	
10	KA 70	Ragamuffin	New South Wales	Frers Maxi	24.13	Syd Fischer	3:00:57:17	

Notes

^1 – Rothmans were penalised 10% of their placing on corrected time and were stripped of the line honours award due to Breaching Rule 26 (Advertising) by flying a spinnaker with an illegal advertising logo on it.
