= EF Language =

Volvo Ocean 60 yacht

- Other names: Illbruck; Magnavox 2UE; Nokia 2UE; Nokia; DHL
- Nation: Sweden; Australia
- Class: Volvo Ocean 60
- Sail no: SWE–1
- Designer(s): Bruce Farr
- Builder: Richard Gilles and Tim Smythe
- Launched: 1997

Racing career
- Skippers: Paul Cayard
- Notable victories: 1997–98 Whitbread

Specifications
- Displacement: 13,500 kg (29,800 lb)
- Length: 19.5 m (64 ft) (LOA)
- Beam: 5.25 m (17.2 ft)
- Draft: 3.75 m (12.3 ft)

EF Language (also known as Illbruck, Magnavox 2UE, Nokia 2UE, Nokia, DHL) is a Volvo Ocean 60 yacht that won the 1997–98 Whitbread Round the World Race.

== Career ==
EF Language was designed by Bruce Farr and built by Richard Gilles and Tim Smythe.

She won the 1997–98 Whitbread Round the World Race skippered by Paul Cayard.

She competed in the 2000 Sydney to Hobart Yacht Race as illbruck and in the 2003 Sydney to Hobart Yacht Race as Nokia 2UE
