= Peter de Ridder =

Dutch businessman and sailor (born 1946)

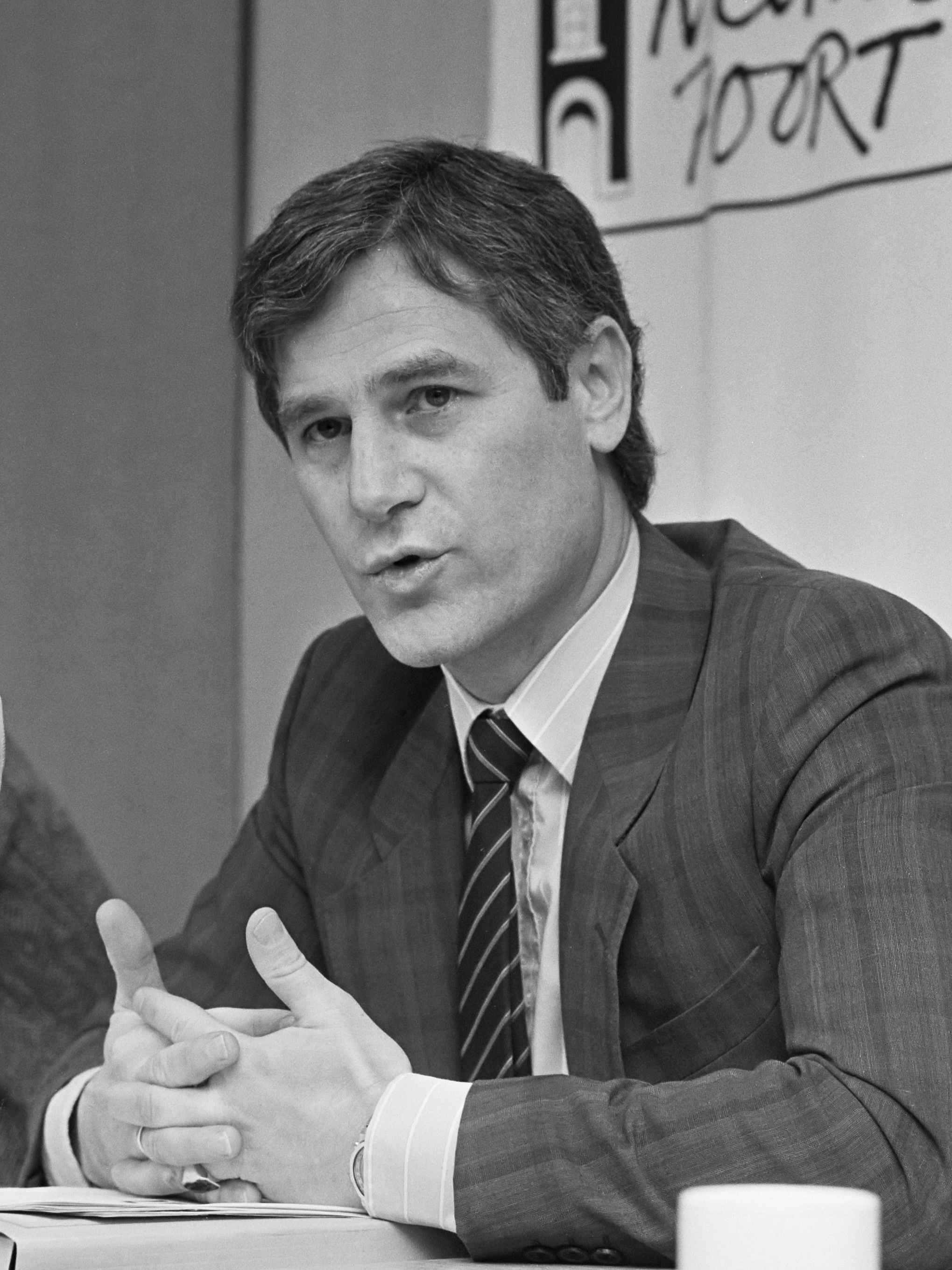
Peter de Ridder

Peter de Ridder is a Dutch businessman and sailor. Born in The Hague on May 18, 1946, this amateur sailor has beaten the world's best sailors, such as New Zealand's Dean Barker or Russell Coutts.

Among the international titles Peter de Ridder has in his prize cabinet are: Admiral's Cup 1999, One Ton European Championships 1988 and 1997, IMS European Championships 1997, Mumm 30 Champions in 2004 and 2005, 2nd runner-up in Farr 40 World Championships in 2005, 3rd place in the TP52 Global Championships 2007, and Winners of the Breitling MedCup 2006, both in the pro and amateur categories.

Peter de Ridder is also the founder and skipper of the Mean Machine team, and has been sailing at the helm of this successful team since 1985.
