= America's Challenge =

- Nation: United States
- Class: Volvo Ocean 60
- Sail no: USA–11
- Designer(s): Alan Andrews
- Builder: Eric Goetz Custom Boats

Racing career
- Skippers: Ross Field

America's Challenge is a yacht that participated in the 1997–98 Whitbread Round the World Race skippered by Ross Field, but did not finish.

== Career ==
America's Challenge was designed by Alan Andrews for Neil Barth's syndicate and built by Eric Goetz Custom Boats.

America's Challenge participated in the 1997–98 Whitbread Round the World Race skippered by Ross Field, but did not finish.
