= Nicorette II =

- Nation: Sweden
- Designer(s): Simonis & Voogd

Racing career
- Skippers: Ludde Ingvall

Nicorette II is a 24 metres (80 ft) sailing yacht built in 1999 in South Africa. The yacht was designed by Simonis & Voogd. She won line honours in the 2000 Sydney to Hobart Yacht Race skippered by Ludde Ingvall.
