= Nicorette (1989 yacht) =

- Other names: Charles Jourdan, CJ Legend; Royal Blue
- Nation: France; Sweden; Germany
- Designer(s): Guy Ribadeau-Dumas
- Builder: MAG-Nordhal Mabire

Racing career
- Skippers: Ludde Ingvall
- Notable victories: 1995 Fastnet Race; 1997 Fastnet Race

Nicorette (also known as Charles Jourdan, Royal Blue) is a maxi yacht designed by Guy Ribadeau-Dumas and built by MAG-Nordhal Mabire.

== Career ==
Charles Jourdan participated in the 1989–90 Whitbread Round the World Race. She was heavily modified by Jussi Mannerberg design team in 1994, and as Nicorette won the 1995 Fastnet Race helmed by Ludde Ingvall. Royal Blue won the 1997 Fastnet Race, helmed by Gunnar Ekdahl.

== See also ==
- Nicorette (1996 yacht)
