= Ross 930 =

Class of fast cruiser-racer yachts

Development
- Designer: Murray Ross
- Year: 1982
- Design: One-Design
- Name: Ross 930

Boat
- Draft: 1.92 m (6 ft 4 in)

Hull
- Type: Monohull
- Hull weight: 2,200 kg (4,900 lb)
- LOA: 9.29 m (30.5 ft)
- Beam: 2.81 m (9 ft 3 in)

Hull appendages
- Keel: Fixed; 794 kg (1,750 lb)

Rig
- Mast height: 12.21 m (40.1 ft)

Sails
- Mainsail area: 21.2 m^{2} (228 sq ft)
- Jib/genoa area: 13.8 m^{2} (149 sq ft)
- Spinnaker area: 1: 65 m^{2} (700 sq ft); 2: 37.8 m^{2} (407 sq ft)

The Ross 930 is a class of fast cruiser-racer yachts named after its designer, New Zealander Murray Ross. The design is marked by light weight and moderate sail area, with a sail-area-to-displacement (SA/D) ratio of about 24, and displacement-to-length (D/L) ratio of 98. The bow section is quite narrow, providing relatively low wave-making resistance and reducing pounding while sailing upwind in waves, and the stern section is wide and flat, making the boat easy to control sailing fast downwind. The interior of the Ross 930 is comfortable, including (and requiring for racing) fitted berths for five, a two-burner stove, galley with sink, and a head. The standard engine is an outboard in a well (this must not be removed for racing), but a few boats were built with small inboard diesel engines.

The prototype was launched in New Zealand in 1982, and since then, over 50 boats have been built to this design.

A few were imported into the US in the mid-80's, and several now reside in the Pacific Northwest region. The boat is fractionally rigged, with a conventional spinnaker pole and symmetric spinnaker. An unusual feature of the rig, required for class racing, is that the jib is sheeted to a self-tacking traveler car. The Ross 930 has a PHRF rating between 96 and 120, depending on region.

== Ross 930 Modified ==
Some Ross 930s have been modified to increase their performance down wind, with a prod (sometimes articulating) and gennakers. A common trend is to also fit a mast head spinnaker halyard so mast head spinnakers and gennakers can be hoisted.

In order to control these more powerful sails, heavier and deeper keels must also be fitted. This will also increase the boat's heavy weather upwind performance. The mast loading is also considerably increased so carbon fibre masts are becoming common place among modified 930s too.

With the use of gennakers and the heavier keels, speeds in excess 20 knots can easily be sustained for long periods of time with the correct wind angle and strength

A 'Box' rule is under development for the Ross 930 Modified so that these can be run as their own class alongside the standard 930 fleet, as currently these boats are sailed as a sort of "outlaw" class.
