= Nicorette (1996 yacht) =

- Other names: Skandia
- Nation: Sweden
- Designer(s): Bruce Farr

Racing career
- Skippers: Ludde Ingvall

Nicorette (also known as Skandia) is a 24.5 metres (80 ft) Ericsson 80 yacht.

== Career ==
Nicorette won Round Gotland Race and broke the record as the fastest monohull yacht over the Atlantic. She broke the 92-year-old record of Atlantic in 1997.

Nicorette was later renamed Skandia and competed in the Adecco World Championships.

== See also ==
- Nicorette (1989 yacht)
