= Ross Field (sailor) =

New Zealand sailor

Ross Field (born 1949) is a New Zealand sailor who competed in Whitbread Round the World Races.

Field, a one-time police detective from Wanganui, started sailing full time in 1985. He first sailed in a Round the World Race on NZI Enterprise under skipper Digby Taylor. The boat did not finish the 1985–86 Whitbread Round the World Race. He was on Steinlager 2 when it won the 1989–90 Whitbread Round the World Race. For the 1993–94 Whitbread Round the World Race, Field skippered Yamaha. Yamaha won the Whitbread 60 class and finished second overall. Field won the 1997 Fastnet Race on BIL. He skippered America's Challenge during the 1997–98 Whitbread Round the World Race. His son Campbell sailed with the boat, losing his index finger during an onboard accident. The team, unable to acquire proper funding, withdrew from the race in Cape Town. In 1999, Field won the Fastnet Race on RF Yachting. Then he became skipper for Jez Fanstone on Team News Corp for the 2001–02 Volvo Ocean Race, alongside his son. Leg 3 of the race included the 2001 Sydney to Hobart Yacht Race. Field acted as co-skipper for the race but stood down from the sixth leg of the race due to a back injury. Field entered the two-person 2011–12 Global Ocean Race with his son, sailing the Buckley Systems. His team was forced to withdraw following an accident in leg 3. Field has 5 grandchildren.
