= Brunel Sunergy =

- Nation: Netherlands
- Class: Volvo Ocean 60
- Sail no: NED–11
- Designer(s): Judel/Vrolijk
- Builder: Holland Composites

Racing career
- Skippers: Hans Bouscholte; Roy Heiner

Brunel Sunergy is a yacht. She finished eight in the 1997–98 Whitbread Round the World Race skippered by Hans Bouscholte and Roy Heiner.

== Career ==
Brunel Sunergy was designed by Judel/Vrolijk and built by Holland Composites.
