= Ludde Ingvall =

Finnish sailor

Ludvig "Ludde" Ingvall (born 8 January 1956) is a Finnish-Australian sailor competing in offshore races.

== Career ==
In his youth, Ingvall sailed in the Flying Junior, 420 and 505 classes. He participated in the 1985–86 Whitbread Round the World Race as crew and in the 1989–90 Whitbread Round the World Race as skipper.

Ingvall won the 1995 Fastnet Race with the yacht Nicorette. With his second yacht named Nicorette, he broke the record of fastest monohull yacht over the Atlantic. He also won line honours in the 2000 and 2004 Sydney to Hobart Yacht Race. In 2016 Ingvall returned to the Sydney to Hobart with a rebuilt and lengthened Nicorette now renamed CQS and crossed the line in 7th position with a time of 2:03:13:12.

== Personal life ==
Ingvall was born in Helsinki, Finland. He and his South African wife moved to Australia in 2001, and he has dual citizenship of Australia and Finland.
