= Toshiba (yacht) =

US sailing yacht

- Nation: United States
- Class: Volvo Ocean 60
- Sail no: USA–1
- Designer(s): Bruce Farr
- Builder: New England Boat Works

Racing career
- Skippers: Dennis Connor; Paul Standbridge

Specifications
- Length: 64ft

Toshiba is a yacht. She finished seventh in the 1997–98 Whitbread Round the World Race skippered by Dennis Connor and Paul Standbridge. During the race she achieved the 24hour distance record for monohulls, covering 434.4nm at an average of 18.1kts.

== Career ==
Toshiba was designed by Bruce Farr and built by New England Boat Works.
