= Grant Dalton =

New Zealand sailor

Grant Dalton OBE
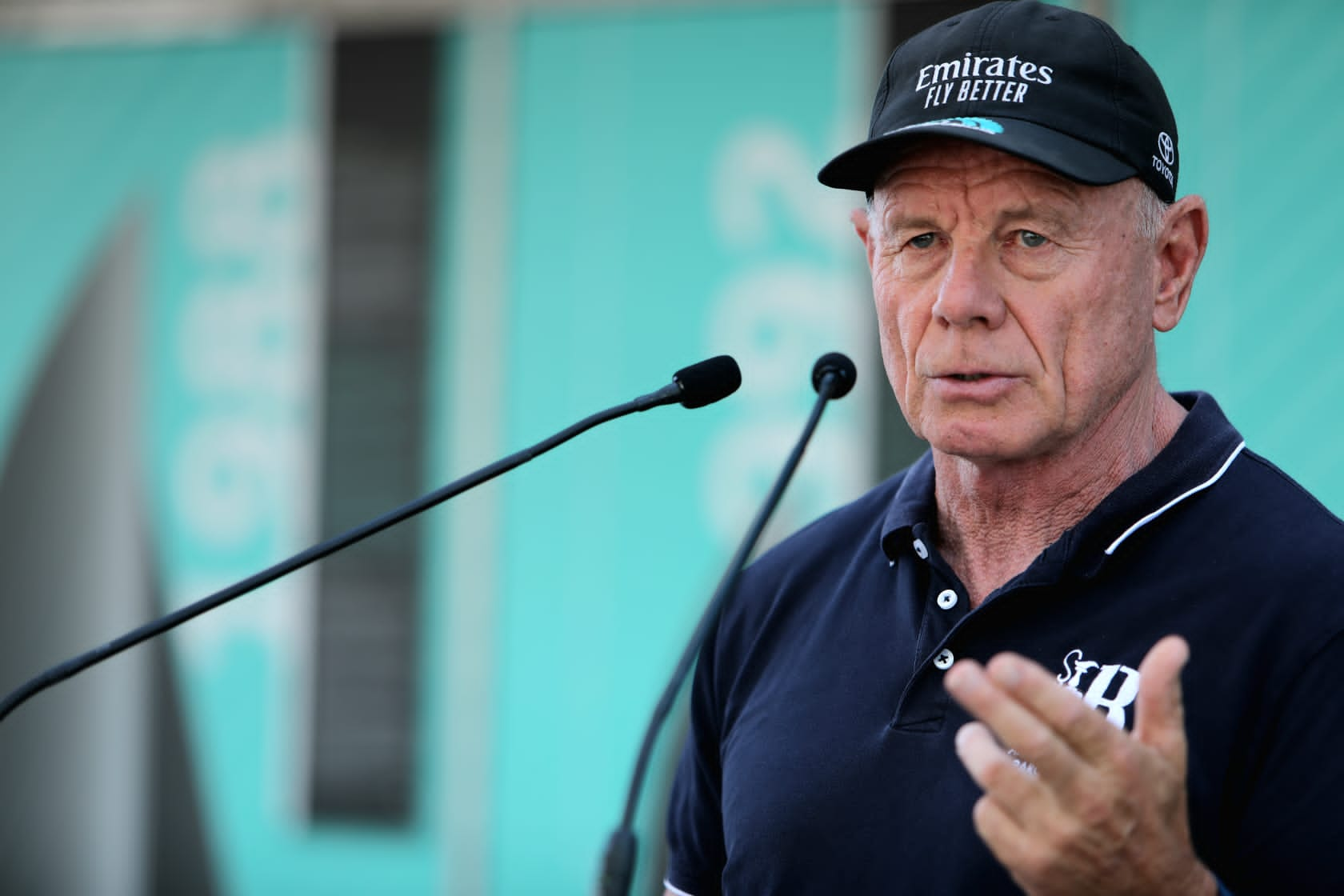
- Born: Auckland, New Zealand
- Occupation: Sailor
- Known for: CEO of Team New Zealand

Grant Stanley Dalton OBE is a New Zealand sailor who has competed in five Whitbread Round the World Races and was appointed manager of Team New Zealand in 2003, and as of 2024 is CEO of the team. He is also passionate about motor racing and is an avid F1 fan. In 2014 he started racing on the New Zealand motor racing circuit.

== Early years ==
Grant Stanley Dalton started sailing at the age eight in the P Class, and soon started racing as a member of Maraetai Sailing Club.

== Sailing career ==
=== Offshore racing ===
Dalton has raced around the world seven times; the first five as part of the Whitbread Round the World Race later to be called the Volvo Ocean Race. This race has evolved through this time from a race of adventurers to a grand prix yachting event. Dalton has participated in the following major events:

- 1981–82 Whitbread in Flyer II
- 1983 Southern Cross Cup
- 1985 Admiral's Cup
- 1985–86 Whitbread in Lion New Zealand
- 1987 Admiral's Cup
- 1989–90 Whitbread in Fisher & Paykel a Maxi Ketch designed by Farr Yacht Design
- 1991 Fastnet
- 1993–94 New Zealand Endeavour
- 1997–98 Merit Cup – Volvo Ocean 60
- 2001–02 Amer Sports One – Volvo Ocean 60 designed by German Frers

He then skippered and won The Race, a sprint around the world on maxi catamaran Club Med. The race started on 1 January 2001 and finished on 3 March. Club Med broke several records along the way including the distance sailed in 24 hours (656 nautical miles) and the fastest circumnavigation (62 days and 7 hours).

=== America's Cup ===
Dalton was called in as manager to restructure and revitalise Team New Zealand after its loss of the America's Cup in February 2003.

- 2017: 35th America's Cup Team New Zealand CEO Winning Team
- 2021: 36th America's Cup Team New Zealand CEO Winning Team
- 2024: 37th America's Cup Team New Zealand CEO Winning Team

== Motorcycle road racing career ==
=== Manx GP & Classic TT ===
In 2014, at 57 years old, Dalton entered the Manx Grand Prix as a newcomer, and also the F1 Classic TT, saying "I've done seven laps around the world and a few America's Cups, but this is the most extreme thing I’ve ever done". He lacked relevant experience, and his best lap in qualifying on his F1 Suzuki was 87.799 mph and he did not finish the Classic F1 TT, which was won by fellow Kiwi Bruce Anstey at a race average speed of 121.597 mph.

However, Dalton was back in 2015 and this time qualified for the F1 TT with a lap of 100.047 mph. He gained a coveted finisher's medal for the 2015 Classic F1 TT, with an overall race average speed for the four laps, which includes the time spent stationary in the pits for a gravity-fed refuelling stop, of 97.047 mph.

== Awards and honours ==
Dalton was appointed an Officer of the Order of the British Empire in the 1995 New Year Honours, for services to yachting.

He was shortlisted in 2001 by the International Sailing Federation for the ISAF World Sailor of the Year Awards.

In September 2023, Dalton was awarded the Premio Impulso Ciudades (Impulse Cities) in the inaugural Premios Vanguardia, presented at the National Museum of Art of Catalonia in Barcelona in 2023 by the King Felipe of Spain.
