= Merit Cup =

- Nation: Monaco
- Class: Volvo Ocean 60
- Sail no: MON–7000
- Designer(s): Bruce Farr
- Builder: Martin Marine

Racing career
- Skippers: Grant Dalton

Specifications
- Displacement: 13,500 kg (29,700 lb)
- Length: 19.5 m (64 ft) (LOA)
- Beam: 5.25 m (17.2 ft)
- Draft: 3.75 m (12.3 ft)

Merit Cup is a yacht. She finished second in the 1997–98 Whitbread Round the World Race skippered by Grant Dalton.

== Career ==
Merit Cup was designed by Bruce Farr and built by Martin Marine.
