= NZ Endeavour =

New Zealand yacht

- Nation: New Zealand

Racing career
- Skippers: Grant Dalton
- Notable victories: 1993–94 Whitbread; 1992 Sydney–Hobart; 1994 Sydney–Hobart

NZ Endeavour is a yacht. She won the 1993–94 Whitbread Round the World Race skippered by Grant Dalton.
