= Greg Elliott =

New Zealand sailing yacht designer

Greg Elliott is a New Zealand sailing yacht designer. He is most notable for the Elliott 6m, an Olympic-class keelboat selected for the women's match racing event for the 2012 Olympics.

He has designed yachts that have won all four Blue Water Classic races, the Fastnet Race, the Transpacific Yacht Race, the Sydney to Hobart Yacht Race, and the Transatlantic Race. He has also designed several yachts that hold or held world records, including Mari-Cha IV.

== Early career ==
Greg started his career with a boat building apprenticeship in Auckland. He then started building boats to his own designs and due to their success in races around New Zealand, started receiving commissions for other designs.

== Royal New Zealand Yacht Squadron Youth Scheme ==
In 1987 the Royal New Zealand Yacht Squadron recognised they didn't have enough crew to compete in the America's Cup. They commissioned a fleet of Elliott 5.9s for their Youth Keelboat Programme. Many of New Zealand's successful America's Cup sailors learned their craft on these boats and examples of their successor the Elliott 6m. The success of the Elliott 5.9m for youth sailing schemes led to its adoption around New Zealand.

== Elliott 6m ==
The Elliott 6m is an Olympic-class keelboat, designed by Elliott. It was selected for the women's match racing event at the 2012 Summer Olympics. The Elliott 6m carries a spinnaker pole and symmetric spinnaker, which is considered more suitable for match racing.

== Mari-Cha IV ==
Mari-Cha IV is a sailing superyacht built as a two-masted schooner. The boat was ordered by Robert Miller with the particular goal of winning sailing records. The yacht has a waterline length of 40.2 m, a width of 9.6 m, and a displacement of 50 t. It was equipped with a canting keel with a 10 t keel bulb, which is able to exert a much larger righting moment then a conventional keel.

On October 9, 2003, Mari-Cha IV improved the previous record for fastest west–east transatlantic passage by a sailing monohull by more than two days, with a total time of 6 days, 17h, 15m and 39s. During the run, she also won the record for longest distance sailed in24 hours, covering 525.5 nautical miles. This record was only broken 13 years later, in 2016, by Comanche.

Mari-Cha IV gained particular distinction in 2005, when she broke the 100-year-old record for fastest monohull Atlantic crossing under regatta conditions (as opposed to solo runs, where the team can wait for optimal weather projections), previously established by Atlantic under Charlie Barr during the 1905 Kaiser's Cup. During the 2005 Rolex Transatlantic Challenge she beat out another Greg Elliott design, Maximus, for line honours and set the new record of 9 days, 15 hours, 55 minutes and 23 seconds.

== Maximus ==
Maximus is a 100 ft maxi yacht built by TP Cookson for Charles St. Clair Brown; The boat was designed by Greg Elliott and Clay Oliver and was launched in Auckland in February 2005. For the 2005 summer sailing season in the UK, Maximus was sponsored by ICAP. She won line honours in the Fastnet Race with a time of 68 hours 2 minutes 7 seconds, though Iromiguy won on corrected time. Despite the very calm conditions, her tall rotating rigging allowed higher wind speeds some distance above the water's surface to be accessible, giving her an advantage over rivals.

ICAP sponsored Maximus again for the 2006 season.

Maximus was acquired by Sydney accountant Anthony Bell and renamed Investec LOYAL. After undergoing modifications by Elliott, she came second to Wild Oats XI in the 2010 Sydney to Hobart Yacht Race and won line honours in the following year's Sydney to Hobart, in a very close race.

== Designs ==
- Elliott 6m
- Mari-Cha IV
- Maximus
- Elliott 1350
- Elliott 5.9m
- Elliott 35SS
- Elliott 1050

== See also ==
- Bruce Farr
- Ron Holland
- Bruce Nelson
- Doug Peterson
- Laurie Davidson
- Juan Kouyoumdjian
- Frank Bethwaite
