= Mari-Cha IV =

Schooner superyacht

Mari-Cha IV is a schooner superyacht, built for American billionaire Robert Miller with the goal of winning sailing records. The designers were Philippe Briand, Greg Elliott and Clay Oliver. The yacht has a waterline length of 40.2 m, a width of 9.6 m, and a displacement of 50 t. It was equipped with a canting keel, with a 10 t keel bulb, which is able to exert a much larger righting moment than a conventional one.

In 2015 the yacht was renamed Samurai and converted to a fast luxury cruiser. The canting keel was replaced by a simpler retracting keel, and the ship was given a new cabin and interior.

== Records ==
On October 9, 2003, Mari-Cha IV improved the previous record for fastest west-east transatlantic passage by a sailing monohull by more than two days, with total time of 6 days, 17h, 15m and 39s. During the run she also won the record for longest distance sailed in 24 hrs. with 525.5 nautical miles. This was only broken 13 years later, in 2016, by Comanche.

Mari-Cha IV gained particular distinction in 2005, when she broke the 100-year-old record for fastest monohull Atlantic crossing under regatta conditions (as opposed to solo runs, where the team can wait for optimal weather projections), previously established by Atlantic under Charlie Barr during the 1905 Kaiser's Cup. During the 2005 Rolex Transatlantic Challenge she beat out Maximus for line honours and set the new record of 9 days, 15 hours, 55 minutes and 23 seconds.

In July 2004, the yacht also won the record for the fastest passage from the US west coast to Hawaii.
