= Atlantic Yacht Club =

Yacht club in New York CIty

Coordinates: 40.697098°N 73.992420°W

- Burgee
- Short name: AYC
- Founded: 1866
- Location: 3 Monroe Place, Brooklyn, NY 11201United States
- Website: www.atlanticyachtclub.com

The Atlantic Yacht Club is a family-oriented yacht club located on the shores of Gravesend Bay in south Brooklyn. A storied member of the New York sailing community, the club is perhaps best known for its contributions to New York sailing in the late 19th and early 20th centuries, when it featured prominently as one of the leading yacht clubs of its day.

The Atlantic Yacht Club's facilities have moved several times over its history: the first facility was located at the foot of Court Street on Gowanus Bay in Gowanus, Brooklyn; it subsequently moved to a site at the foot of 55th Street in the neighborhood that subsequently became known as Sunset Park, Brooklyn. In 1898 it moved to perhaps its most famous club-house, located in Seagate. Seagate is located on the western end of Coney Island, and the club facilities were located on the northern, inland, side of Coney Island facing Gravesend Bay. For many years, the Atlantic Yacht Club was one of the largest and most prestigious yacht clubs in New York City. The club's current location on Gravesend Bay faces out toward its former Sea Gate site. A family oriented sailing club, the Atlantic Yacht Club sponsors an active junior sailing program.

== History ==
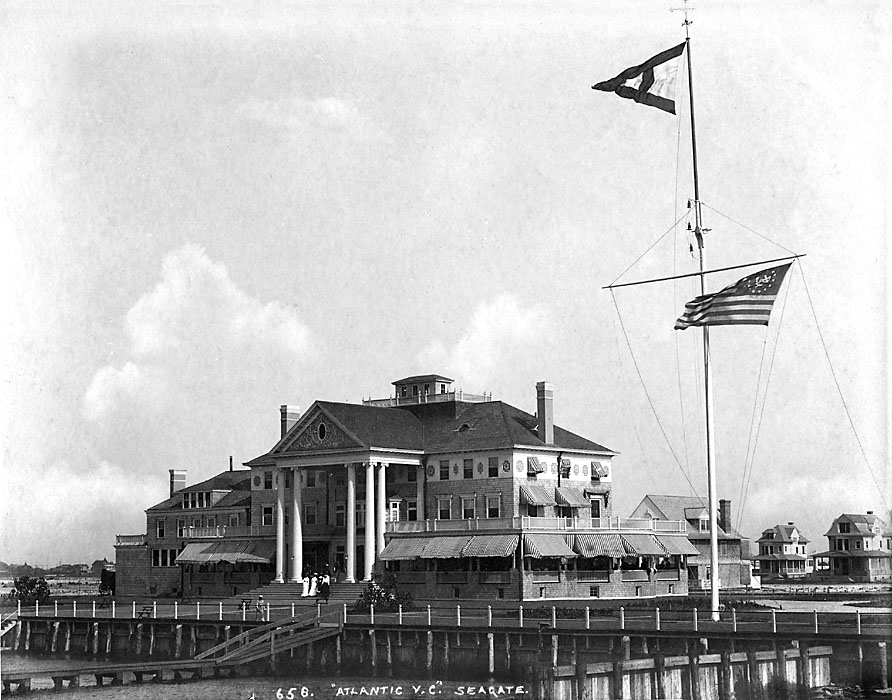
Clubhouse of the Atlantic Yacht Club at Seagate, as it appeared in the 1890s. Photo by John S. Johnston.

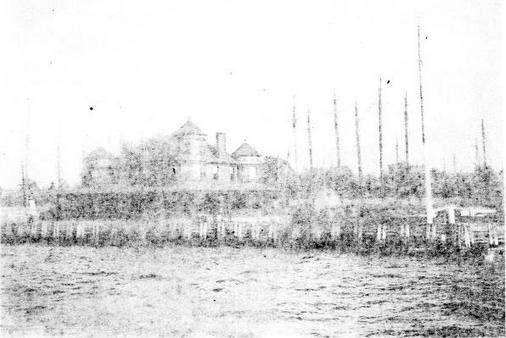
Atlantic Yacht Club House c 1894

The Atlantic Yacht Club was organized in 1866 by a breakaway group from the earlier Brooklyn Yacht Club. Within five years its membership rolls eclipsed those of the Brooklyn Yacht Club, and the club developed a reputation as an active corinthian sailing organization that attracted many of Long Island's most prominent citizens and soon drew in members from throughout the region, as well as prominent sailors who frequented the active New York sailing season. The Atlantic Yacht Club rapidly developed into one of the most active yacht clubs in New York, hosting regular regattas and competing against the leading yacht clubs in the region. The club's annual Atlantic Race Week and Lipton Cup regatta regularly drew sailors from around the world, competing in multiple classes. The club was also a driving force behind the formation of the United States Power Squadrons in 1914.

The club's original clubhouse was a barge that was moored at the foot of Court Street at the end of Gowanus Creek, facing Gowanus Bay. Gowanus Creek, and the Erie Basin in Red Hook, Brooklyn served for several decades as a center of the New York sailing and yachting community, and several important boat yards were located in the area. As time passed, however, increasing industrialization in the area led many to relocate to other sites around New York Harbor and, indeed, locations in Long Island Sound. In the early 1880s, the club acquired a waterfront farm property on 55th Street in Yellow Hook, Brooklyn. The neighborhood subsequently assumed the name of Bay Ridge, a name suggested by club-member, former Commodore and leading Brooklyn florist, James Weir. The converted clubhouse was soon replaced by a larger facility constructed at the end of the club's new pier at the end of 55th Street. A marina and anchorage were established at the same site at that time.

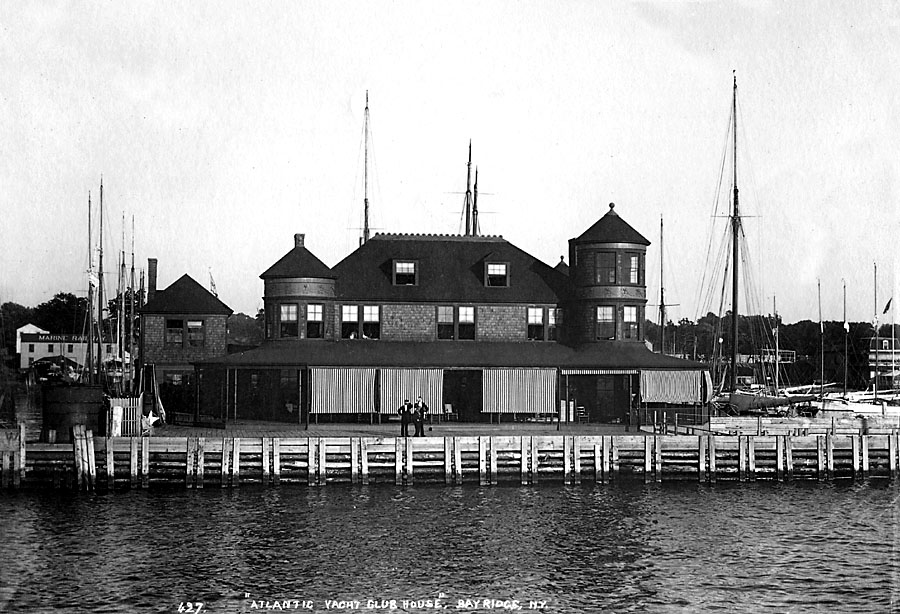
Clubhouse of the Atlantic Yacht Club at 55th Street in Bay Ridge, Brooklyn, as it appeared in the early 1890s. Photo by John S. Johnston.

A new clubhouse at Seagate was designed by Frank Tallman Cornell and built in 1898 on Poplar Avenue overlooking Gravesend Bay (the site of the old clubhouse becoming the main yard of the Morse Dry Dock and Repair Company). The move to the new clubhouse was driven in large part by Commodore George Jay Gould I, the prominent financier and a son of Jay Gould. The club attracted New York socialites and aristocrats, including prominent members of the Auchincloss, Dodge, Elsworth, Fish, Gould, Hoagland, Iselin, Vermilye and Voorhees families, among many others. Sir Thomas Lipton, J.P. Morgan and the Earl of Dunraven (the British challenger for the America's Cup, with his yacht Valkyrie) were among the club's prominent members. Known for corinthian sailing, for many years the club sponsored one of the most active racing programs in New York Harbor, holding races almost weekly through the summer season. Sir Thomas Lipton, a five-time unsuccessful British challenger for the America's Cup, typically stayed at the club during his America's Cup campaigns. His yacht Shamrock docked at the Atlantic Yacht Club during the Cup campaigns.

The Atlantic Yacht Club played a major role with respect to the famous Kaiser's Cup transatlantic race of 1905. The race was initially proposed on September 18, 1903, at the Sea Gate club-house during a dinner to commemorate the retirement as club Commodore of Robert E Tod. Initially intended as a snub directed at the New York Yacht Club's largely steam-powered yachting fleet, at Lipton's recommendation the regatta was encharged to the New York Yacht Club. In due course, the regatta was won by the yacht Atlantic, sponsored by the New York Yacht Club, and skippered by Charlie Barr. Barr, a three-time winner of the America's Cup, was one of the leading sailors of his day. The Atlantic sailed to victory in record time, establishing trans-Atlantic mono-hull records that stood for 100 years. The AYC's entry, the yacht Thistle, a schooner built in 1901 by New York's Townsend & Dourney, and owned and skippered by Robert E Tod, finished 10th. Tod, a New York investment banker, was the only owner-skipper in the regatta.

The Atlantic Yacht Club's Seagate clubhouse burned down in 1933. The club soldiered on for a number of years thereafter, becoming inactive in the 1950s. The club was revived several decades later, in the early 21st century. Today, the AYC operates as a sailing club located off Bay Parkway, directly across Gravesend Bay from its earlier Sea Gate location, with a social facility in Brooklyn Heights.
