= Paul Ricard (trimaran) =

- Designer(s): Alain De Bergh

Specifications
- Length: 16.50 meters

Paul Ricard was a hydrofoiled trimaran. In 1980, Éric Tabarly sailed the vessel to beat Charlie Barr's transatlantic record on Atlantic, which had stood for 75 years.

== See also ==
- List of multihulls
- Single-Handed Trans-Atlantic Race
