= Pen Duick =

French racing yacht series

Pen Duick is the name best known for a series of ocean racing yachts sailed by French yachtsman Eric Tabarly. Meaning coal tit in Breton, it was the name Tabarly's father gave to the 1898 Fife gaff cutter he purchased, and that his son learned to sail. He thereafter used the name for a series of successful racing yachts through the '60s and '70s.

- The YRA 36 ft linear rater Pen Duick (formerly Yum) was designed by William Fife III and built in 1898 by Gridiron & Marine Motor Works at Carrigaloe in Cork Harbour, Ireland for Cork yachtsman W. J. C. Cummins. The gaff-rigged cutter was quickly noted as a successful racer in Irish, British and French waters. Tabarly's father acquired her when Éric was seven years old, and the boy learnt to sail on her. After World War II, she was put on sale, but finding no takers, Éric convinced his father in giving her to him. Years later, he was told her wooden hull was rotten, and being unable to hire a yard to salvage her, proceeded to save her himself, making a mould to build her a new fiberglass hull: It was the largest of its kind at the time. He refitted her entirely, with a loftier rig for the southern climes. In the night of June 12 to 13 1998, Éric Tabarly fell overboard and was lost in the Irish Sea, while sailing the hundred-year-old cutter en route to the Fife Regatta in Largs, Scotland.
- The wooden ketch Pen Duick II won the 1964 Singlehanded Transatlantic Race with Éric Tabarly.
- The 17.45 m schooner Pen Duick III, with her distinctive clipper bow, was designed entirely by Tabarly, and was built in aluminium. The yacht won the Sydney to Hobart Yacht Race in 1967.
- Pen Duick IV was a 20.50m aluminium trimaran with a ketch rig and rotating masts. She was designed by André Allègre. During the 1968 Singlehanded Transatlantic Race, Pen Duick IV collided with a ship and Tabarly was forced to withdraw from the race. Later, Pen Duick IV was sold to French yachtsman Alain Colas, who rechristened her Manureva and won the 1972 Singlehanded Transatlantic Race with her. In 1978, Manureva sank at sea with her owner.
- The 10.60 m sloop Pen Duick V, featuring novel ballast tanks, was designed by architects Michel Bigoin and Daniel Duvergie for the 1969 Singlehanded San-Francisco to Tokyo Race, which Tabarly also won.
- The 22.25 m ketch Pen Duick VI was built in 1973 to an André Mauric design. She entered the 1973–74 Whitbread Round the World Race, but endured mast breakage on two occasions. Tabarly also entered Pen Duick VI in the 1976 Plymouth to Newport Singlehanded Transatlantic Race, which he won, although the boat was designed for a crew of twelve and competitors endured five consecutive ocean storms. Pen Duick VI later competed against the carbonfiber-masted Heath's Condor in the 1977–78 Whitbread Round the World Race (see Volvo Ocean Race) as an unofficial entrant, due to its own exotic material - depleted uranium ballasted keel. Pen Duick VI is now sailed by Eric Tabarly's Daughter, Marie Tabarly, who is racing it in the 2023 Ocean Globe Race (OGR), a 50th anniversary celebration of the 1973–74 Whitbread Round the World Race.

All Pen Duick yachts, apart from the lost Pen Duick IV, still race in classic events.

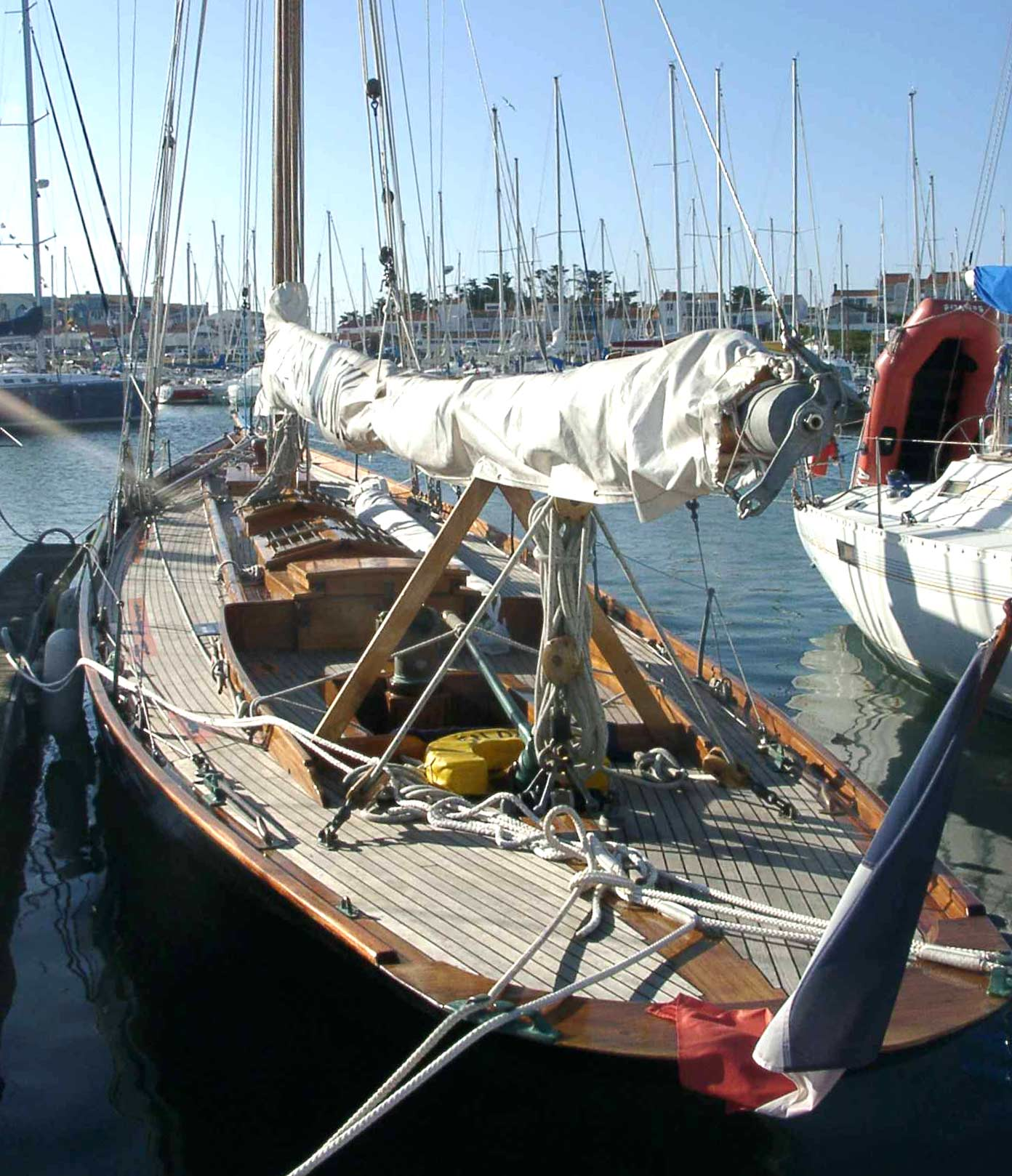
Pen Duick (formerly Yum, 1898)

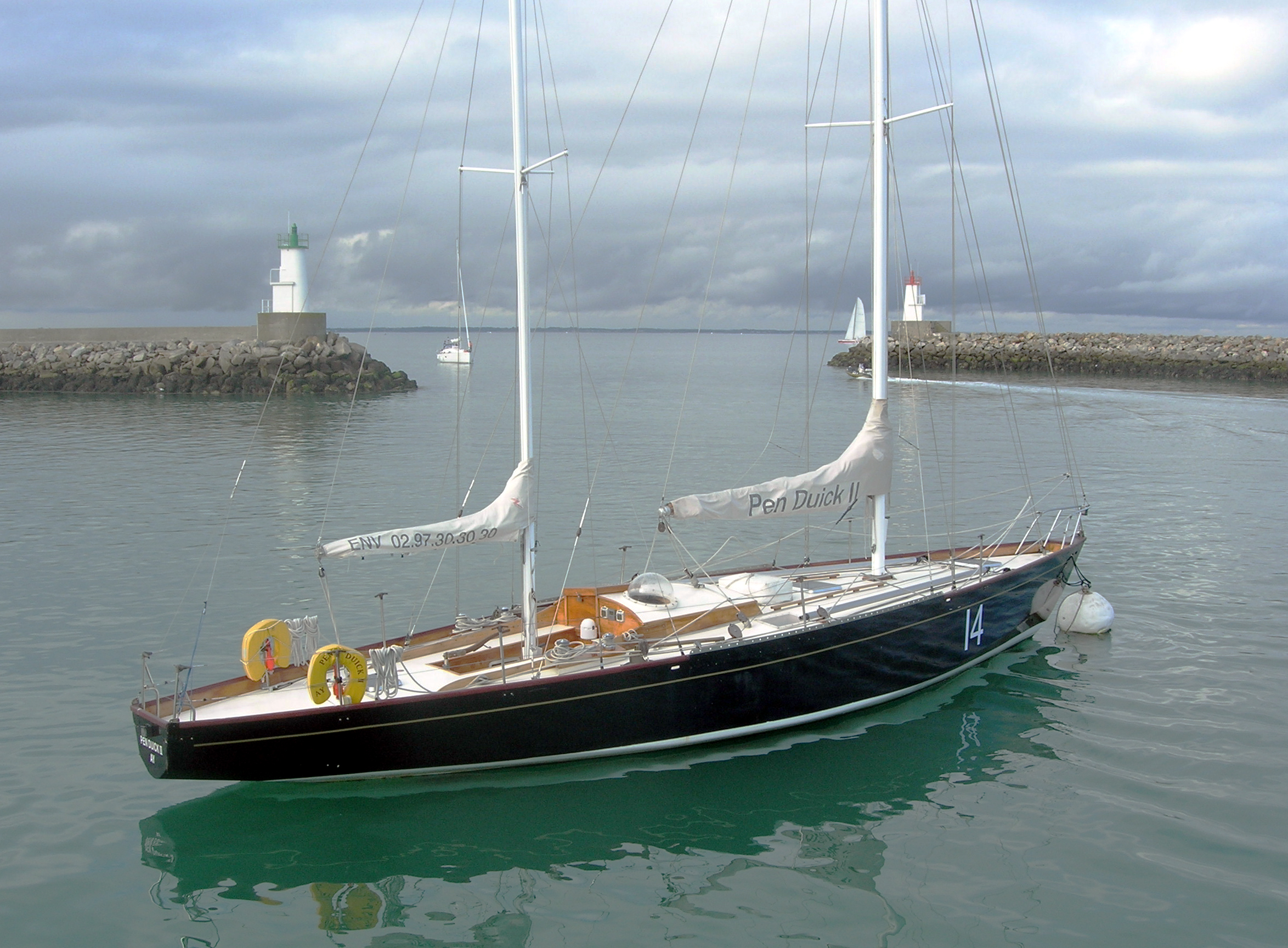
Pen Duick II (1964)

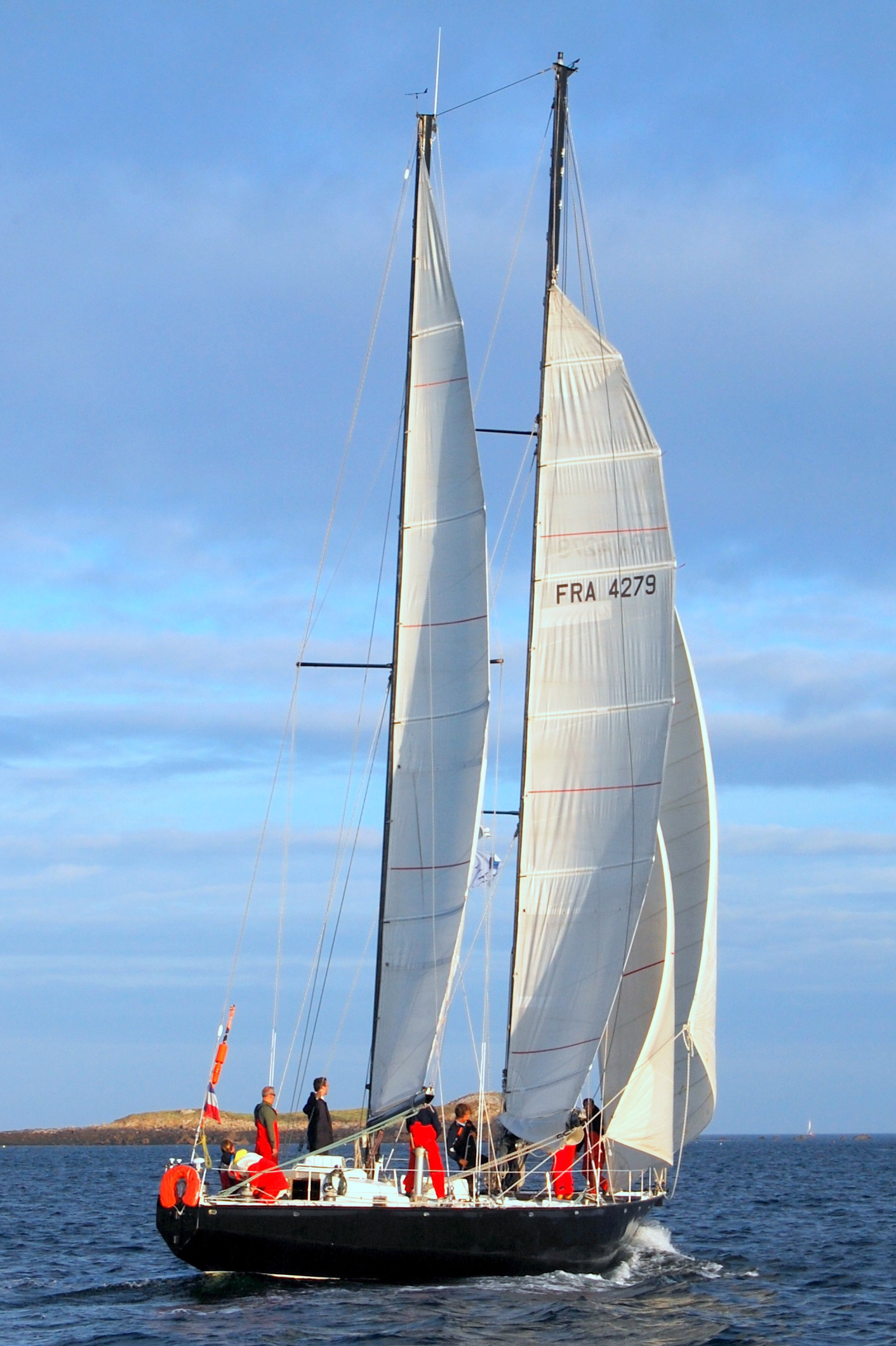
Pen Duick III (1967)

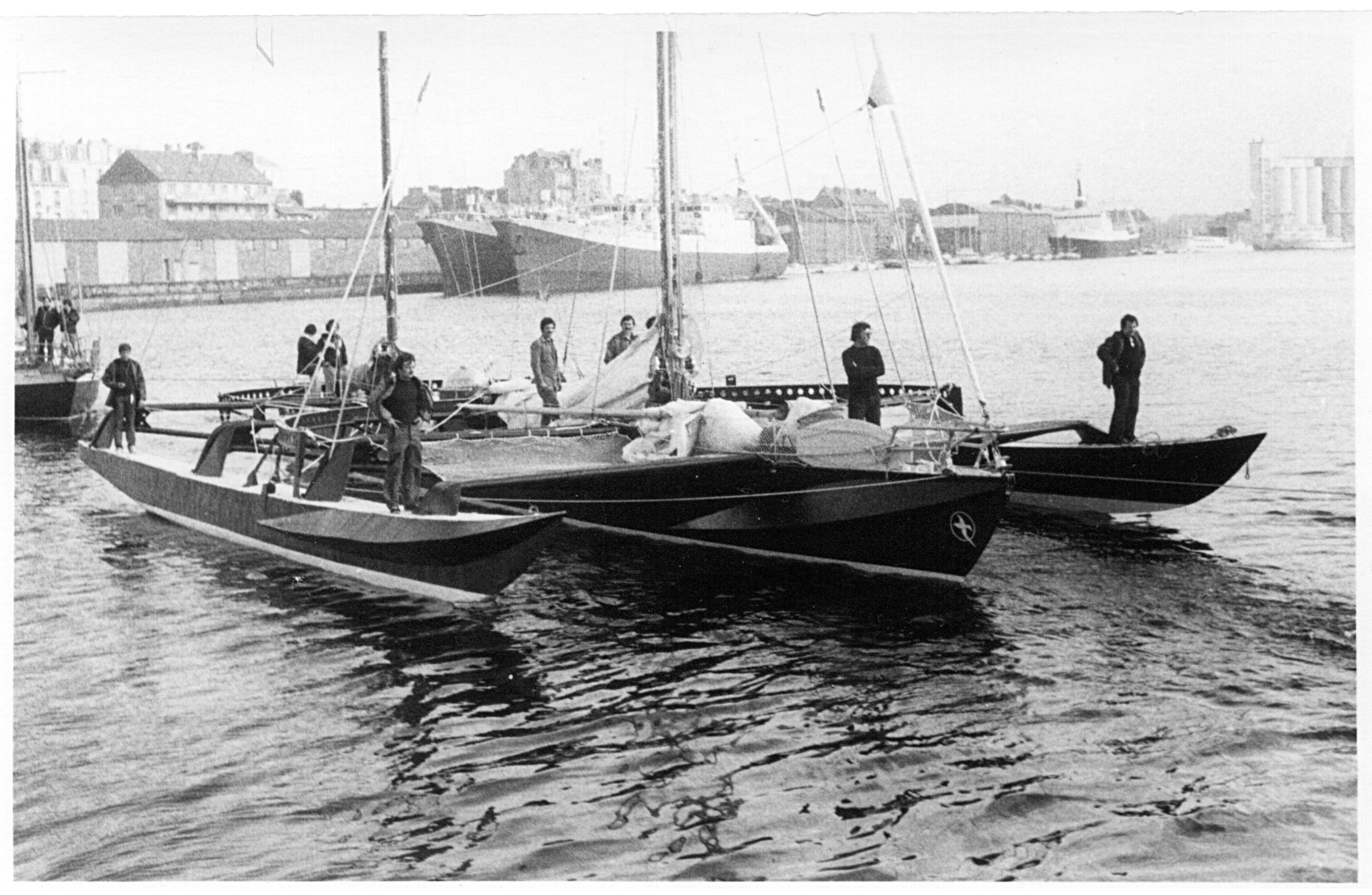
Manureva (formerly Pen Duick IV, 1968)

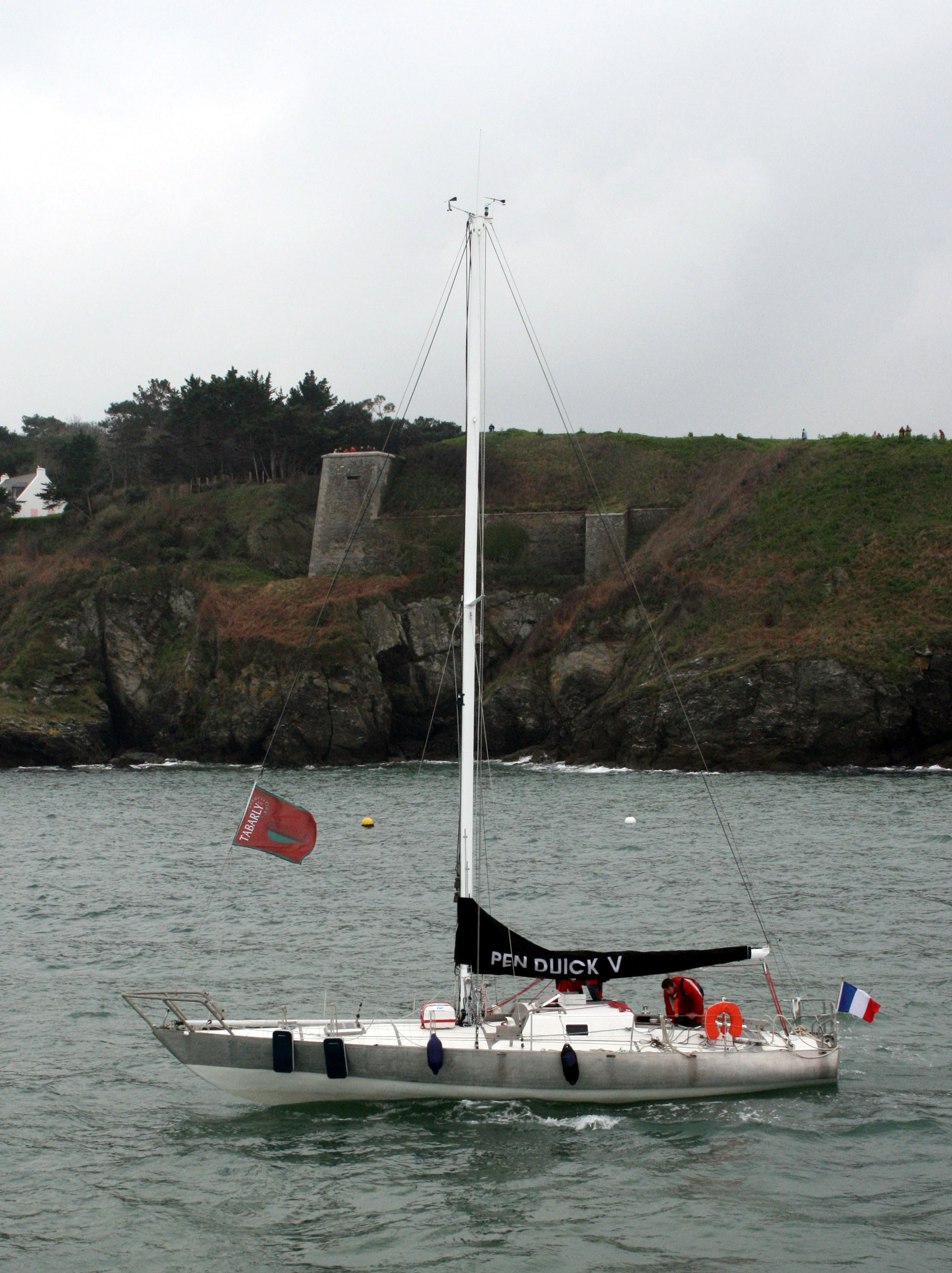
Pen Duick V 1969)

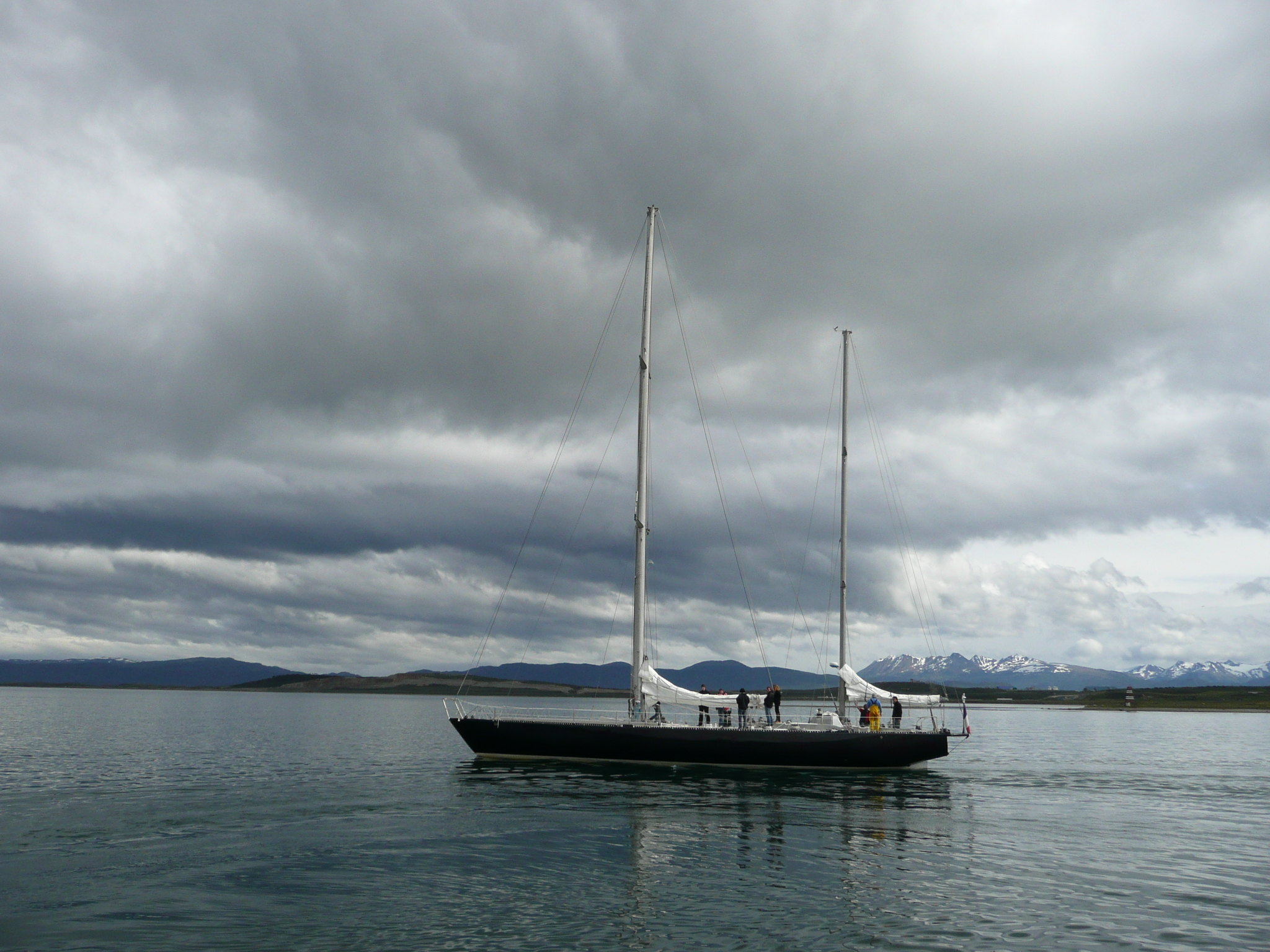
Pen Duick VI (1973)

== External sources ==
- An obituary of Tabarly.
- Pen Duick
- 2008 tribute: Tabarly, a documentary film directed by Pierre Marcel, with musical soundtrack by Yann Tiersen (in French).
- (in French) Légendes - authored by Daniel Gilles
- (in French)Line drawings of the Pen duick fleet - authored by François Chevalier
