= Meteor III =

Meteor III may refer to

- a mark of the Mormon Meteor
- the RV Meteor (1986)
- the Kaiser's yacht, Meteor III (yacht)
