= Shooters Island =

Island in Newark Bay in New York and New Jersey, United States

Coordinates: 40°38′36″N 74°09′35″W

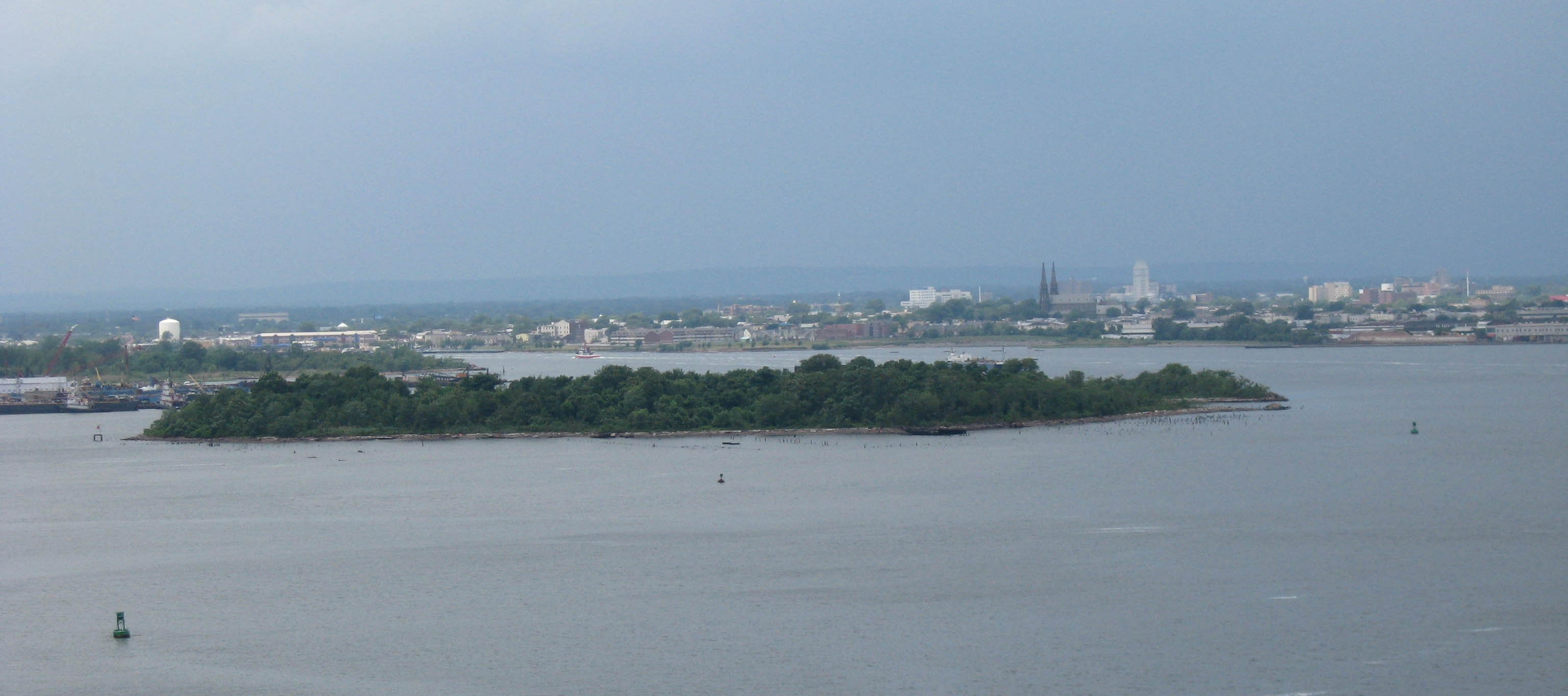
From Bayonne Bridge

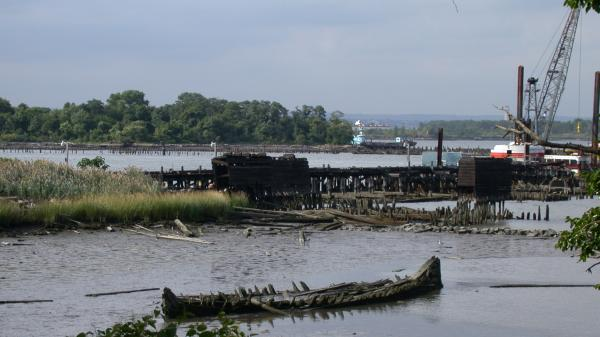
The eastern end of Shooter's Island (background, forested) as seen from the waterfront of Staten Island

Map of Shooters Island with the state and city boundaries

Shooters Island is a 43-acre (17 ha) uninhabited island at the southern end of Newark Bay, off the North Shore of Staten Island in New York City. The boundary between the modern states of New York and New Jersey runs through the island, with a small portion on the north end of the island belonging to the nearby cities of Bayonne and Elizabeth in New Jersey and the rest since 1898, as a part of the borough of Staten Island in New York City of New York.

During the colonial era, Shooters Island was used as a hunting preserve for colonists of nearby provinces. During the American Revolutionary War (1775–1783), Commanding General George Washington and his Continental Army used the island as a drop-off point for messages, and the place became a haven for spies.

The island's large oyster beds were heavily harvested following the war; they were ultimately exhausted from overharvesting by the 19th century.

== Shipyard ==
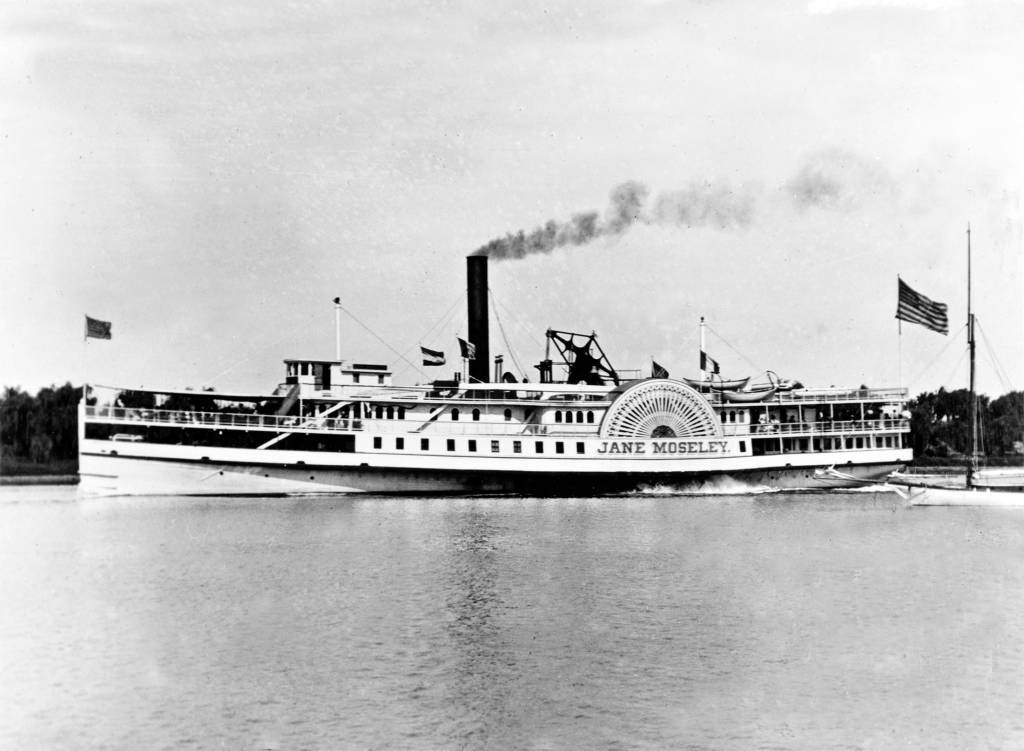
Jane Moseley, built in 1873, renamed Minerva 1911–1932

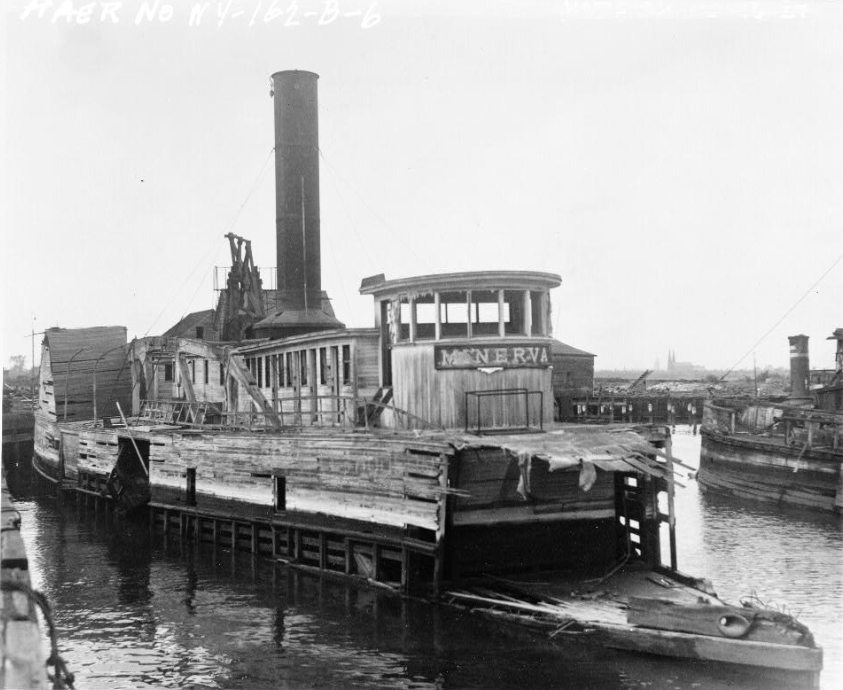
S.S. Minerva seen abandoned in the boat basin off Shooters Island, c. 1936

The first shipyard on Shooters Island was established in 1860 by David Decker. From 1898 until 1910, the island was home to a major shipyard, the Townsend-Downey Shipbuilding Company. Theodore E. Ferris, who later designed ships used by the American government in the First World War, was an employee of the firm. By the late 19th century the island was occupied by many industrial facilities, shops, docks, and offices.

The Townsend-Downey Company built a yacht, Meteor, for Kaiser Wilhelm II of the German Empire (Germany). Its launch in February 1902 was attended by many hundreds of spectators, including President Theodore Roosevelt, and his guests Prince Henry of Prussia (1862–1929). The president's daughter Alice Roosevelt christened the boat. Thomas Edison sent a cameraman to make a newsreel recording of the event. The next day a reception was held at the White House in Washington for Mr. Downey, the owner of the shipbuilding yard, and representatives of the German government.

In 1904, the schooner Atlantic was also built and launched at the yard. The following year, it raced across the Atlantic Ocean and won the Kaiser's Cup and set a speed record for the crossing under sail which stood unbroken for almost 90 years. The brigantine yacht Carnegie was built for the Carnegie Institution of Washington, D.C. for use in magnetic surveys in the Pacific Ocean. Constructed entirely of wood and non-ferrous metals so as not to interfere with the taking of magnetic measurements, she was named after industrialist and philanthropist Andrew Carnegie, of Pittsburgh, Pennsylvania and New York City, who also was a friend of Mr. Downey.

In November 1903, the island came under control of the Tidewater Oil Company. In 1905, the eight buildings of the plant and the surrounding industrial complex were purchased by the Colonial Trust Company for $516,000. At the time, the shipyard was valued at two million dollars. The shipyard was later home to the Standard Shipbuilding Company, which bought the entire island in 1915.

The island continued to be used for industrial and shipbuilding operations through 1922. Abandoned and broken vessels began to accumulate around the perimeter of the island in Newark Bay, near Staten Island by 1930.

== Bird sanctuary ==
Shooters Island began to support nesting wading birds, cormorants and gulls in the early 1970s. At its peak in 1995, the island supported 400 nesting pairs of herons, egrets, ibis and 121 nesting pairs of double-crested cormorants.

Nine acres of the island's 43 acres are part of New Jersey (7.5 acres in Bayonne and 1.5 in Elizabeth) while the remainder is part of New York state, New York City and Staten Island. New York state paid New Jersey $30,000 for the right to manage the island in perpetuity, and it was assigned to the city's Department of Parks and Recreation to manage as a bird sanctuary. The island is closed to the general public; wildlife research is provided by the New York Audubon Society.

The island and decayed remnants of old piers are visible to users of the Bayonne Bridge between Staten Island and Bayonne, New Jersey.

== See also ==
- Geography of New York Harbor
