= 2005 Rolex Transatlantic Challenge =

The 2005 Rolex Transatlantic Challenge was celebrated at the 100th anniversary of the 1905 race for the Kaiser's Cup also known as "The Great Ocean Race". In this race, there was a skipper named Charlie Barr who raced the 3-masted schooner called Atlantic across the ocean for nearly 3,000 nautical miles (6,000 km) of the North Atlantic to set a monohull unbeaten record for the 1905 course of exactly only 12 days, 4 hours, 1 minute and 19 seconds.

In the years that followed, other yachts made the same west-east Atlantic crossing in much faster times but not, however, in any official race, this was not to happen until the 2005 Rolex Transatlantic Challenge. The Atlantic held her title for 100 years, making it the oldest record recognized by the World Sailing Speed Record Council of the ISAF.

== Four records were up for grabs in the 2005 Rolex Transatlantic Challenge ==
- The Atlantic's record, for yachts which do not use a powered sailing system.
- The NYYC organised Ambrose Tower to The Needles Race, open to all entrants.
- The monohull transatlantic passage record.
- The transatlantic powered sailing systems record.

In addition to some official records, there were also a number of impressive silver cups to be passed along for various titles and classes, and some major pre- and post-race festivities held respectively by the New York Yacht Club and the Royal Yacht Squadron at Cowes, on the Isle of Wight.

== The Race Course ==
The 2005 Rolex Transatlantic Challenge began May 22 at a point near Ambrose Tower off Sandy Hook, New Jersey, in the vicinity of the former Sandy Hook Lightship. Though she is no longer with us, the old Lightship Ambrose was a starting point for many transatlantic record attempts. Entrants raced north and eastward toward The Lizard, on the southwestern tip of Cornwall. There was a northern course boundary of sorts, established by the International Ice Patrol.

Yachts were required to pass through a "gate" (imaginary line) extending from the Lizard Point Lighthouse to a point four miles (6 km) offshore. The course then ran another 142 nautical miles (263 km) farther to the second finish near the Needles Channel entrance at the western end of The Isle of Wight. Yachts

The 2005 Rolex Transatlantic Challenge was open to monohull yachts whose deck lengths were 70 feet (21 m) long or greater. There was no upper size limit. The 21 entries in the 2005 Rolex Transatlantic Challenge ranged in size from the 70-foot (21 m) Swan sloop Stay Calm up to the 252-foot (77 m) square-rigged clipper ship Stad Amsterdam.

Four divisions started: "Classic" (including the Fife-designed ketch Sumurun), "Performance Cruising", "Classes 1 and 2" (including the luxurious ketch Tiara) and "Grand Prix" (the line-honours prize for the match between the maxi yachts Mari-Cha IV and Maximus). The Classic division's handicap system was a modification of a previous NYYC Cruising Rule.

Performance Cruising and Grand Prix divisions operated under Americap II and IRC handicap systems.
