= Éric Tabarly =

French Navy officer and yachtsman (1931–1998)

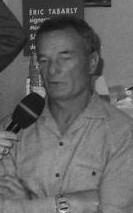
- Tabarly in 1997
- Born: Éric Marcel Guy Tabarly; 24 July 1931; Nantes, France
- Died: 13 June 1998 (aged 66); Pen Duick, Irish Sea, off Wales
- Spouse: Jacqueline Tabarly
- Children: Marie Tabarly
- Military career
- Allegiance: France
- Service years: 1953–1985
- Rank: Commander
- Known for: Sailing career, innovations in naval architecture
- Conflicts: First Indochina War

Éric Marcel Guy Tabarly (24 July 1931 – 13 June 1998) was a French naval officer and yachtsman, a naval architect and boat designer too. He developed a passion for offshore racing very early on and won several ocean races such as the Ostar in 1964 and 1976, ending English domination in this specialty. Several of his wins broke long standing records. He owed his successes to his exceptional mastery of sailing and of each one of his boats, to both physical and mental stamina and, in some cases, to technological improvements built into his boats. Through his victories, Tabarly inspired an entire generation of ocean racers and contributed to the development of nautical activities in France.

Although very attached to the boat given to him early on by his parents – the Pen Duick — he played a pioneering role in successive innovations in naval architecture, including the development of the multihull via the design of his trimaran, Pen Duick IV (1968). His was one of the first offshore racing multihulls and confirmed the supremacy of this type of boat relative to monohulls. Many of the boats that embodied his innovations carried the name of Pen Duick.

== Early life and career ==
Éric Tabarly discovered sailing at the age of three aboard Annie, the family boat. In 1938, his father Guy Tabarly purchased the gaff-rigged cutter Pen Duick, built in 1898 and designed by William Fife. The previous owners had renamed it Pen Duick, which means coal tit in Breton.

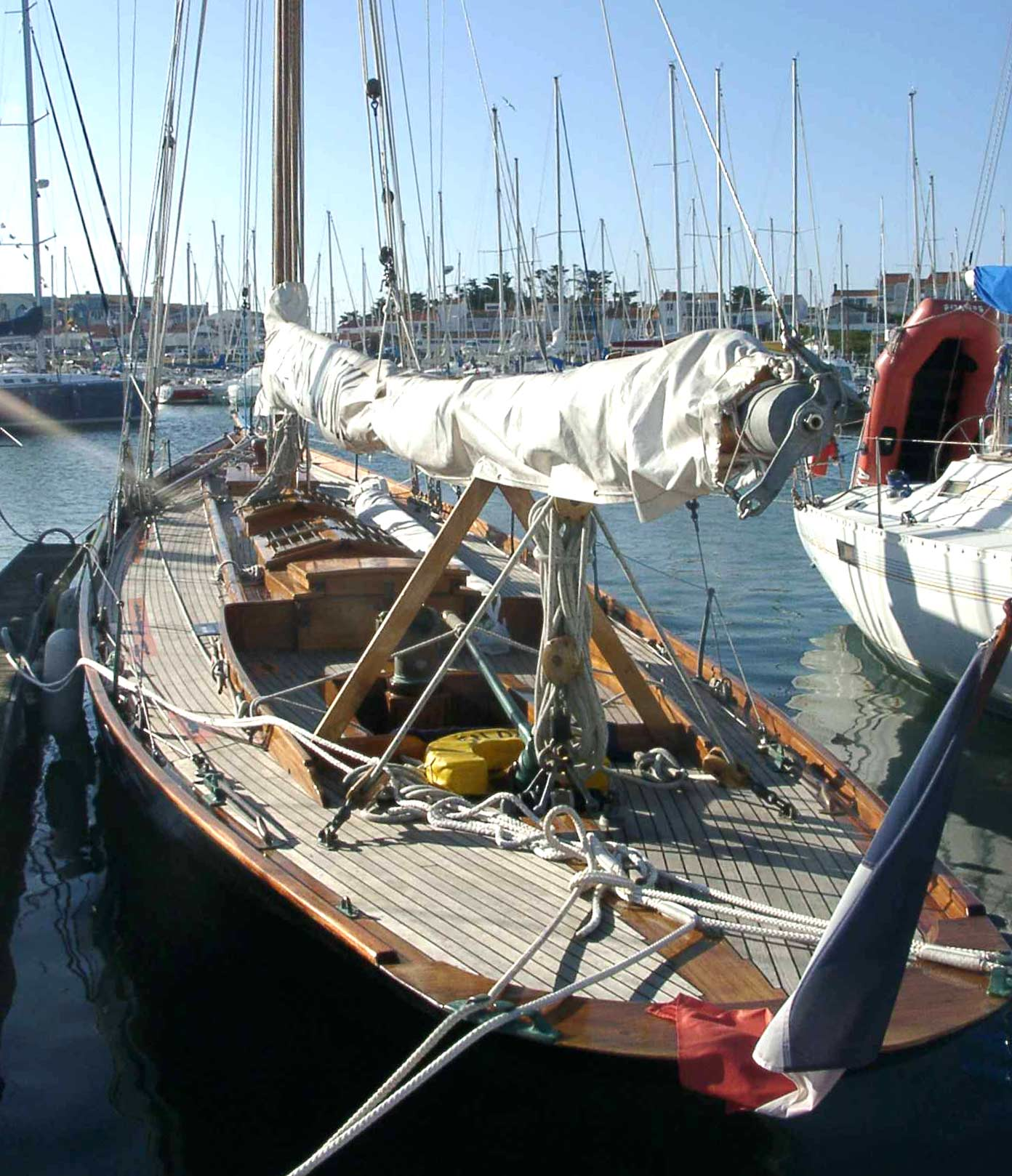
Tabarly's cutter, the Pen Duick, purchased by his parents and later given to him

Tabarly enlisted in the Navy as a volunteer in 1953 and joined the French Aéronavale. He served at Saint-Mandrier airbase before transferring to French airbases in Morocco. After earning his pilot licence and the rank of Second Maître de deuxième classe in December 1954, he fought in the First Indochina War, appointed to Tan Son Nhut Air Base.

In August 1956, Tabarly started refitting Pen Duick in his spare time. She was in a state of disrepair since the Second World War, during which she had been decommissioned for fear of being requisitioned, and her wooden hull had rotted. Tabarly endeavoured to rebuild her using polyester resin. The conversion was completed, and Pen Duick was launched in April 1958.

In September 1957, he was appointed to Lann-Bihoué airbase, near Lorient.

In 1958, Tabarly entered the École Navale; he was promoted to Aspirant the next year, and Enseigne de Vaisseau de deuxieme Classe in 1959. On 16 November 1960, Tabarly embarked on the school cruiser Jeanne d'Arc, for the ritual circumnavigation that is part of the practical teaching at the École Navale. Jeanne d'Arc returned to Brest on 8 June 1961 and the same month, Tabarly was appointed to the Minesweeper Castor with the rank of Enseigne de Vaisseau de Premiere Classe. He was later given command of the landing craft EDIC 9092.

== Careers in racing and in the navy ==
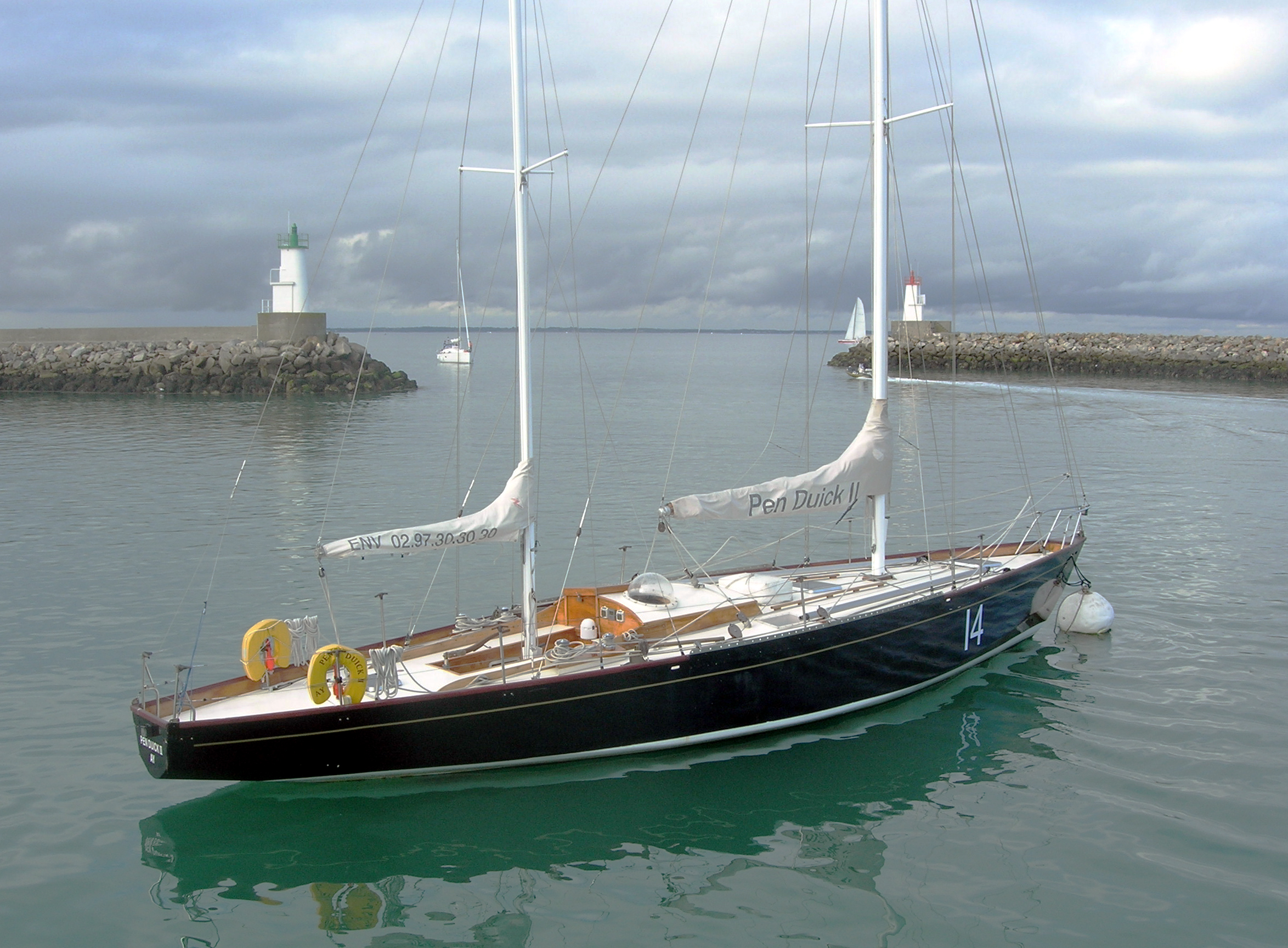
Pen Duick II

In 1964, Tabarly won the Single-Handed Trans-Atlantic Race on Pen Duick II. Tabarly had intended to sail the Margilic V, then in autumn 1963, realizing he was capable of handling a larger boat, began building the Pen Duick II, the first sailboat designed specifically for a single-handed trans-Atlantic race. He won with a time of twenty-seven days and three hours, which was 3 days in advance of the runner-up. This achievement earned Tabarly instant fame and the rank of Chevalier de la Légion d'honneur. He received the Blue Water Medal for his victory.

In 1965, he earned his Commandos Marine certification. The same year, he transformed Pen Duick II into a wishbone schooner. The next year, Pen Duick II was shortened to match the regulations of the Cruising Club of America, and Tabarly single-handedly sailed her to New York. He achieved a 5th position in the Bermuda Race, and raced in the Bermuda-Copenhagen race, but had to abandon with a ruptured rudder. In October 1966, he was promoted to Lieutenant de Vaisseau.

The Ministry of Defence then detached Tabarly to the Ministry of Youth Affairs and Sports, allowing him to concentrate on his racing career. In 1967, Tabarly won the Channel Race, Round Gotland Race, and Sydney to Hobart Yacht Race on Pen Duick III.

In 1968, Tabarly raced the Single-Handed Trans-Atlantic Race again, on Pen Duick IV, a brand-new trimaran that was competitive in all wind conditions. The new Pen Duick IV was damaged by Hurricane Brenda on 11 June, and never finished the race.

In 1969, Tabarly shadowed the Transpacific Yacht Race (from Los Angeles to Hawaii) on Pen Duick IV. He had originally intended to enter the race but was unaware that multihulls were not invited. Having started with all other participants, Tabarly and his crew set an unofficial record of 8 days and 13 hours, almost a day ahead of the official winner and record-setter Blackfin.

Tabarly returned to naval service in February 1971 and was appointed to the Technical Inspection for Physical Education and Sports. The same year, he won the Falmouth-Gibraltar on Pen Duick III and the Middle Sea Race, and the following year, the Transpac.

In 1973, he sailed in the first edition of the Whitbread. Tabarly was promoted to lieutenant commander in 1976.

In 1980, Tabarly sailed the hydrofoil trimaran Paul Ricard on a transatlantic race, beating Charlie Barr's long-standing transatlantic record. Tabarly was deeply involved with the development of this revolutionary trimaran. In 1975, he worked with a team of naval architects and another team from Dassault company on the design of a foiler-type trimaran (equipped with foils). Subsequently, he searched for financing to build this vessel for four years. In 1979, he met Paul Ricard who agreed to finance him. This 16.50-meter aluminium trimaran displacing 7 tonnes is characterized by its unique, streamlined connecting arm which rests on two small floats, themselves fitted with foils (submerged streamlined carrier surfaces). Tabarly then sailed the Paul Ricard and beat the record for crossing the North Atlantic, held since 1905 by Charlie Barr's fully manned schooner Atlantic, thereby launching a race for crossing records by multihulls.

In June 1980, Tabarly joined the Académie de Marine. He was promoted to Capitaine de Corvette in 1982.

== Retirement and fatal accident ==
Tabarly retired from active service in July 1985. He was promoted to Capitaine de Fregate of the naval reserves in August 1988. In 1994, he raced the Whitbread again. In 1997, Tabarly won the Fastnet Race on Aquitaine Innovations.

In June 1998, the Pen Duick was en route from Cornwall to Scotland to participate in a rally of boats designed by William Fife, which included the Pen Duick. The crew consisted of Tabarly and four other people. While in transit in the Irish Sea, during the night of 12 to 13 June, a spar threw Tabarly overboard and he drowned. A detailed account of the accident was made by people who were on the boat with Tabarly when it occurred.

His body was recovered by the trawler An Yvidig on 20 July. An autopsy confirmed the identity of the body and the cause of death as drowning.

== Career wins ==
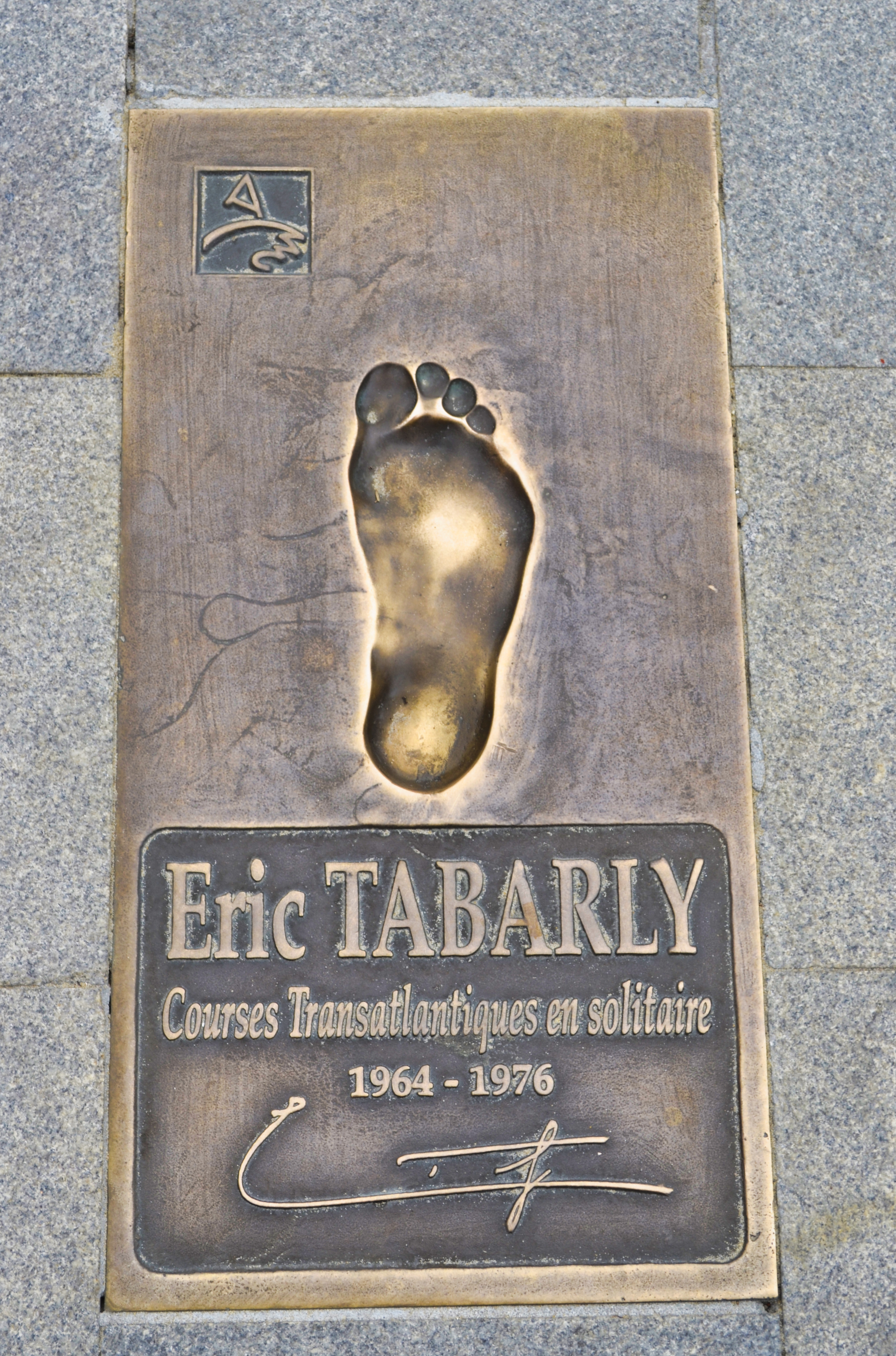
- Tabarly's footprint memorialized in his honor at Arcachon
  OSTAR (Plymouth-Newport) : 1964 on Pen Duick II and 1976 on Pen Duick VI
- Morgan Cup : 1967 on Pen Duick III
- Round Gotland Race : 1967 on Pen Duick III
- Channel Race : 1967 on Pen Duick III
- Fastnet Race : 1967 on Pen Duick III and 1997 on Aquitaine Innovations
- Plymouth-La Rochelle : 1967 on Pen Duick III
- Sydney-Hobart : 1967 on Pen Duick III (and second in handicap time)
- Transpac San Francisco-Tokyo (Transpacific) : 1969 on Pen Duick V (with an 11-day lead over the runner-up)
- Falmouth-Gibraltar : 1971 on Pen Duick III
- Los-Angeles-Tahiti : 1972 on Pen Duick III
- 2nd leg of the Whitbread Round the World Race Volvo Ocean Race Cape Town-Sydney : 1973 on Pen Duick VI
- Bermuda-England : 1974 on Pen Duick VI
- Triangle Atlantique : 1975 on Pen Duick VI
- 2nd of the Transat en double Lorient-Bermuda-Lorient : 1979 (with Marc Pajot) on Paul Ricard
- Transatlantic sailing record from West to East (New York-Cape Lizard), on the multihull Paul Ricard in 1980 in 10 days 5 hours 14 minutes and 20 seconds (previous record was in 1905 held by Charlie Barr on a 50-crewman schooner)
- 4th of the Transat en solitaire : 1984 on Paul Ricard
- 2nd of the Transat Le Point-Europe 1 Lorient-Saint-Pierre-et-Miquelon-Lorient: 1987 on Côte d'Or
- Transat en double Le Havre-Carthagène (with Yves Parlier) : 1997 on Aquitaine Innovations

== Memoirs or writings of Éric Tabarly ==
- Victoire en solitaire, Atlantique 1964, Arthaud, Paris, 1992. Pocket format en 1995. New edition in 2007, 288 pages, ISBN 978-2-08-125992-8
- Mémoire du large, édition de Fallois, juin 1997, 352 pages. EAN 9782877062992. Reedition Le Livre de Poche, L.G.F., Paris, mai 1998, 304 pages, ISBN 978-2-253-14448-9 ou ISBN 978-2-253-14448-9.

== Citations and references ==
Citations

References

- Taillemite, Étienne (2002). Dictionnaire des Marins français. Tallandier. ISBN 2-84734-008-4.

External links

Media related to The Pen Duick at Wikimedia Commons

- Pen Duick
- 2008 tribute: Tabarly, a documentary film directed by Pierre Marcel, with musical soundtrack by Yann Tiersen (in French).

== Bibliography ==
- Gilles Pernet, Tabarly, une vie d'homme libre, Calmann-Lévy, 1977, 126 pages. (Life as free man)
- Benoit Heimermann, Tabarly, l'homme de granit, Essais et documents, Grasset, 2002, 380 pages. (Breton sailor, described as a man of granite)
- Jacqueline Tabarly & Daniel Gilles, À Éric, édition du Chêne, Paris, reedition 2008
- Jean Guichard, Vincent Guigueno et Jacqueline Tabarly, Tabarly de mémoire, Éditions de La Martinière, Paris, 2018, 240 pages.
- Pierre Bazantay, Tabarly, collection Icônes, Éditions François Bourin, Paris, 2019, 142 pages.

== See also ==
- List of people who disappeared mysteriously at sea
- Among his sailing teammates, Alain Colas, Olivier de Kersauson, Titouan Lamazou, Marc Pajot, Yves Parlier, Philippe Poupon etc.
- Florence Artaud
- Isabelle Autissier
- Clarisse Crémer
- Michel Desjoyeaux
- Jean Le Cam
- Armel Le Cléac’h
- Bernard Moitessier
- Jean-Luc Van Den Heede
