= Maxi yacht =

Large racing yacht, at least 21 metres in length

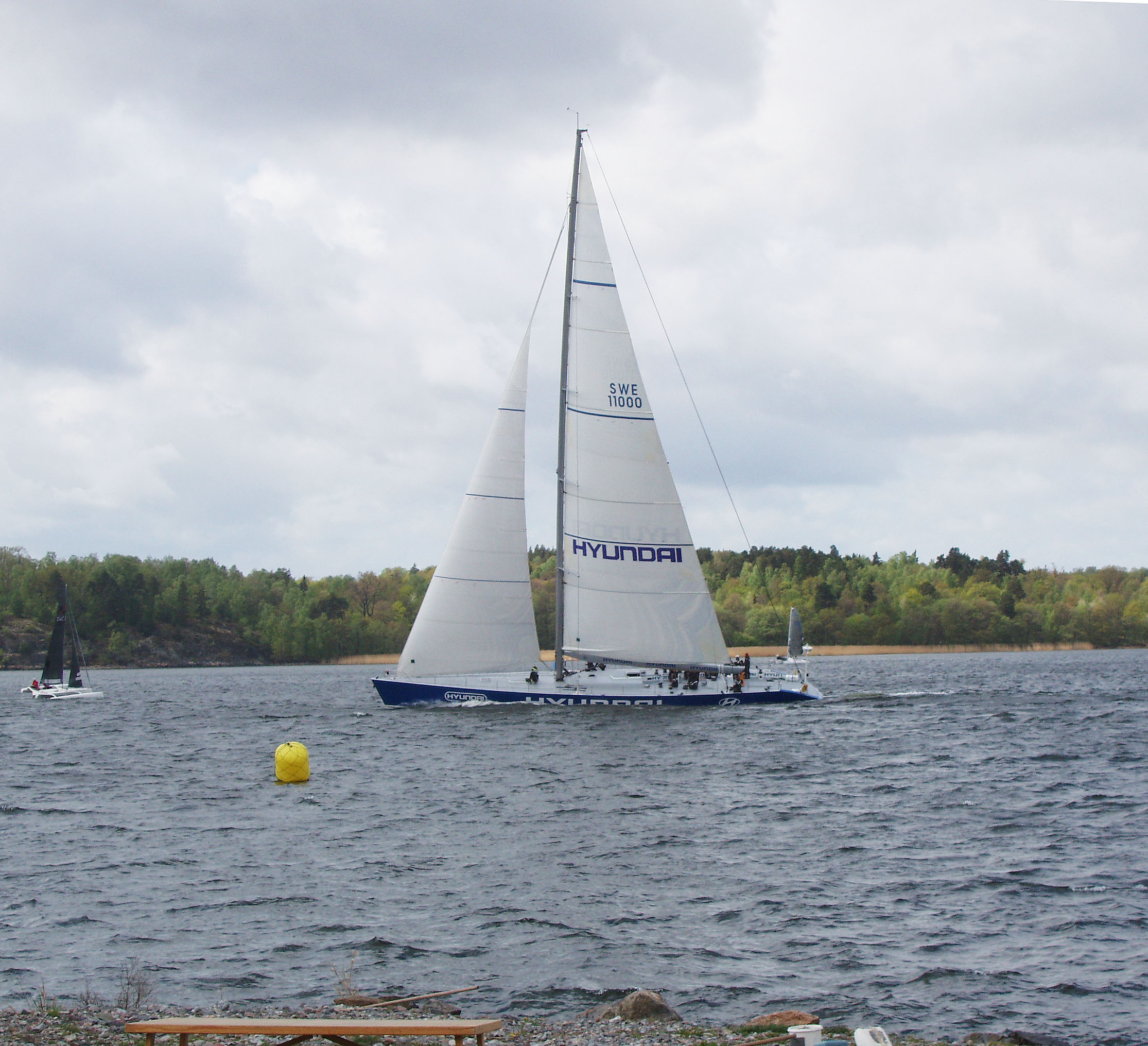
Hyundai, May 2009

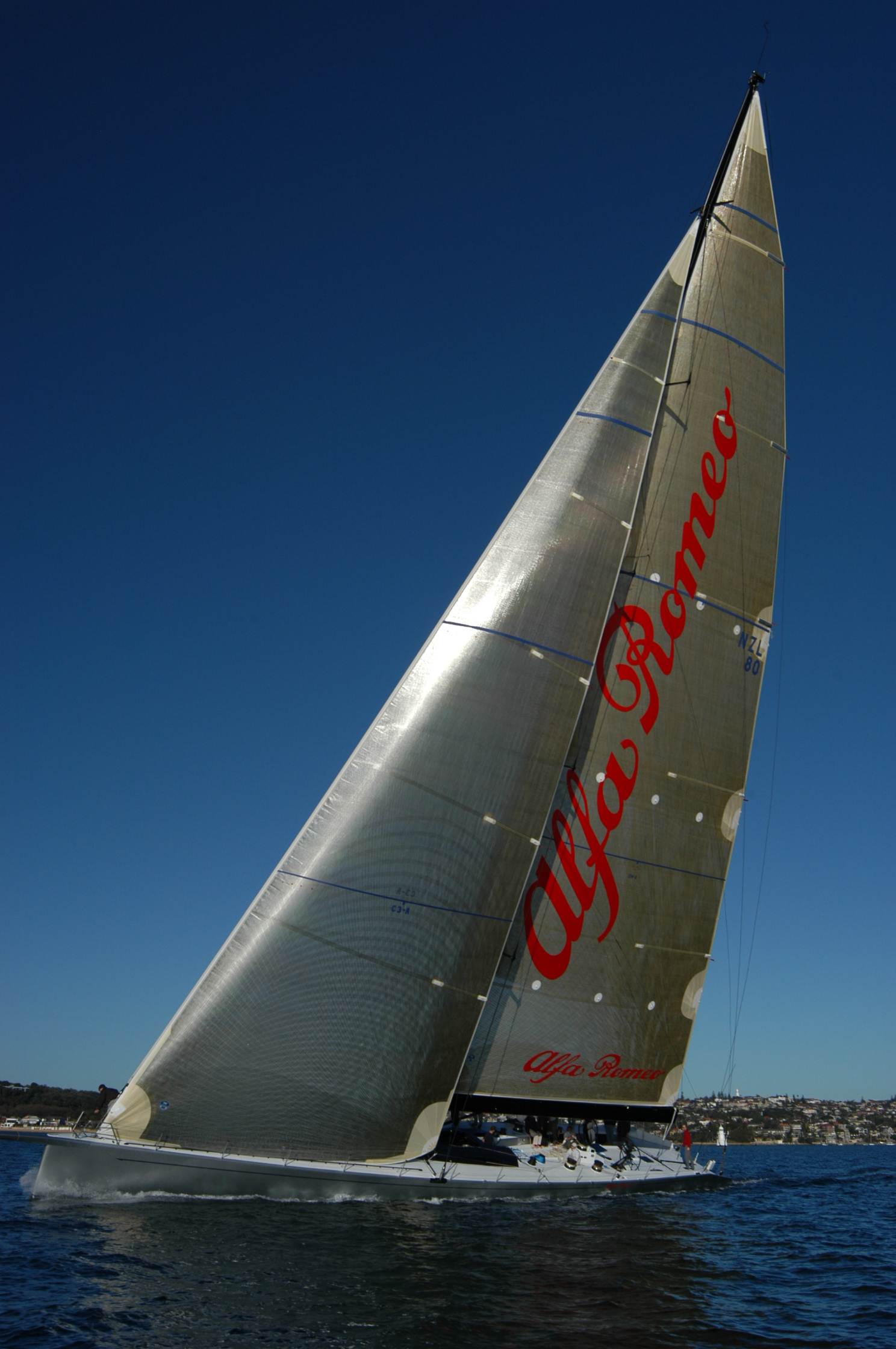
Alfa Romeo II on sea trials, 2005

A maxi yacht usually refers to a racing yacht of at least 21 metres (70 ft) in length.

== Origin ==
The term maxi originated with the International Offshore Rule (IOR) rating system, which in the 1970s and 1980s measured offshore racing yachts and applied a single-number rating to each boat. This number was approximately equal to the sailing waterline length in feet, plus or minus speed enhancing or reducing factors in the design. A yacht with a rating of 12 metres (40 ft) was generally about 14 to 16 metres (47 to 52 ft) in length overall. The IOR had upper and lower rating limits of 4.9 metres (16 ft) and 21 metres (70 ft), so a yacht designed and built to exceed the maximum limit of 21 metres (70 ft) rating was known as a maxi.

Being the biggest sailing yachts afloat, Maxis have always had the best chance of finishing first. They were sufficiently fast and seaworthy to cross oceans and became the craft of choice of pioneers of the Whitbread Round the World Race. The racing giants in the Maxi Yacht Rolex Cup 2005 are the modern descendants of those early aquatic thoroughbreds.

— Charles St. Clair Brown, EPS / Maximus

== Competition ==
The IOR Maxis were generally 23 to 25 metres (75 to 82 ft) long overall, and raced boat-for-boat without handicap, unlike the rest of the IOR fleet which raced with a time correction factor depending on the boat's rating. In the 1980s they were the most glamorous, exciting, expensive and high-visibility racing yachts in the world, with regular appearances at most of the great races such as the Fastnet, Sydney-Hobart, Bermuda Race, and their own private series of regattas in the Mediterranean and Caribbean seas. The maxis were also prominent as line honour contestants in the Whitbread Round the World Race from 1973 to 1993.

== Modern maxis ==
Modern maxi yachts are usually custom-designed and built to the IRC rule but regardless of handicap in order to achieve line honour victories. In 2001 however two 26 m (86 ft) Reichel/Pugh boats were built to the "maxZ86" class in order to match boat speed evenly, but the class did not generate further interest. For the 2009 Sydney to Hobart Yacht Race, the Cruising Yacht Club of Australia increased the IRC rating upper limit for length of hull from 29.9 to 30.5 m (98 to 100 ft), and most 29.9 m (98 ft) yachts have been lengthened to this size. In order to achieve higher speeds, maxi yachts were early adopters of modern materials and technologies such as carbon fibre, thermoformed sails, rotating wingmasts, water ballasts, canting keels, and hydrofoils. Previous smaller maxi yachts are still raced with corrected time class victories in mind whilst the 22 m (72 ft) "mini-maxi" yachts now have a class of their own. Maxi yachts are raced in both inshore and offshore races.

=== List of largest maxi yachts ===
Yacht	Year	LOA	Designer	Shipyard	Notes
Stealth	1996	28 m (93 ft)	Germán Frers	(United Kingdom) Green Marine	Owned by Gianni Agnelli, won the 2001 Fastnet race
Cap Gemini	1999	30 m (100 ft)	Ron Holland	(United Kingdom) Pendennis	Renamed Hyundai, now Light One
Leopard 2	2000	29 m (96 ft)	Reichel/Pugh	(United Kingdom) Green Marine	Now Maria Alba II
Alfa Romeo I	2002	27 m (90 ft)	Reichel/Pugh	(Australia) McConaghy Boats	Renamed Shockwave, then Rambler, now La Bête, won the 2002 Sydney-Hobart, the 2003 Fastnet race and four Middle Sea Races
Bols	2003	27 m (90 ft)	Hugh Welbourn	(New Zealand) Boatspeed	Now Med Spirit
Zana	2003	30 m (98 ft)	Brett Bakewell-White	(New Zealand) Hakes Marine	Renamed Konica Minolta, now Lahana, redesigned in 2014 at the TP Cookson yard as 30 m (100 ft) Rio 100
Skandia	2003	30 m (98 ft)	Don Jones, Fred Barrett	(Australia) Hart Marine	Triple Moving Foil, now Wild Thing, won the 2003 Sydney-Hobart
Mari-Cha IV	2003	43 m (140 ft)	Greg Elliott, Clay Oliver, Philippe Briand	(France) JMV Industries	Schooner built for Robert Warren Miller, redesigned in 2015 at Royal Huisman as cruiser Samurai
Nicorette III	2004	27 m (90 ft)	Alex Simonis, Marten Voogd	(New Zealand) Boatspeed	Triple Moving Foil owned by Ludde Ingvall, Renamed Aapt, then YuuZoo, won the 2004 Sydney-Hobart. Redesigned in 2016 by Brett Bakewell-White at the Southern Ocean Marine yard as 30 m (98 ft) CQS
Genuine Risk	2004	27 m (90 ft)	Edward George Dubois	(Australia) McConaghy Boats	Canting Ballast Twin Foil, purchased in 2021 by Meridian Capital. Won 2004 and 2008 Chicago Yacht Club Race to Mackinac, 2010 Newport Bermuda Race, 2011 Fort Lauderdale Montego Bay Race, 2011 Antigua Sailing Week, 2012 and 2014 Rolex China Sea Race - including line honors and race record, 2013 Hong Kong Vietnam Race (record), 2014 Okinawa Tokai Race (record), 2015 Subic Bay Boracay Race (record)
Maximus	2005	30 m (98 ft)	Greg Elliott, Clay Oliver	(New Zealand) TP Cookson	Canting Ballast Twin Foil. Renamed Investec Loyal. Redesigned in 2014 by Andrew Dovell at the Innovation Composite yard as Ragamuffin 100ft. Now Scallywag. Won the 2005 Fastnet race and the 2011 Sydney-Hobart
Alfa Romeo II	2005	30 m (98 ft)	Reichel/Pugh	(Australia) McConaghy Boats	Canting Ballast Twin Foil, now 30 m (100 ft) Black Jack IV, won the 2009 Transpac, the 2009 Sydney-Hobart and three Middle Sea Races
Wild Oats XI	2005	30 m (98 ft)	Reichel/Pugh	(Australia) McConaghy Boats	Development of Alfa Romeo II, now 30 m (100 ft) and completely modernised, won eight Sydney-Hobarts (Line Honours) and the 2015 Transpac
Leopard 3	2007	30 m (98 ft)	Farr Yacht Design	(Australia) McConaghy Boats	Now 30 m (100 ft), won two Fastnet races and the 2009 Middle Sea Race
LawConnect	2008	30 m (98 ft)	Juan Kouyoumdjian	(New Zealand) TP Cookson	Speedboat renamed Virgin Money, Rambler 100, Perpetual Loyal, Infotrack and now 30 m (100 ft) LawConnect, won the 2011 Caribbean 600, the 2011 Newport-Lizard Point race and the 2016, 2023 and 2024 Sydney-Hobart. When the yacht was named Rambler 100 it famously had a keel failure in the 2011 Rolex Fastnet Race, leading to the boat capsizing.
Beau Geste	2013	24 m (80 ft)	Botin Partners	(New Zealand) TP Cookson	Renamed Stefan Racing, now 30 m (100 ft) Wild Thing 100
Rambler 88	2014	27 m (88 ft)	Juan Kouyoumdjian	(United States) New England Boatworks	Now Lucky formerly owned by George David, won the 2015 Middle Sea Race
Comanche	2014	30 m (100 ft)	VPLP, Guillaume Verdier	(United States) Hodgdon Yachts	Holder of the New York-Lizard Point monohull record and former holder of 24hrs monohull record, winner of the 2017 and 2019 Sydney-Hobart
Skorpios	2021	37 m (120 ft)	Juan Kouyoumdjian	(Finland) Nautor Swan	Owned by Dmitry Rybolovlev. Skorpios is the largest Modern Supermaxi yach built. The yacht won Monohull Line Honours in the 2021 Rolex Fastnet Race. Skorpios was the first yacht to have a mast taller than the Fastnet Rock Lighthouse, being 4 metres taller than the structure. Skorpios also has the highest IRC rating ever issued.

• LH designates the length of hull as measured by IRC, excluding bowsprits
