= Manureva =

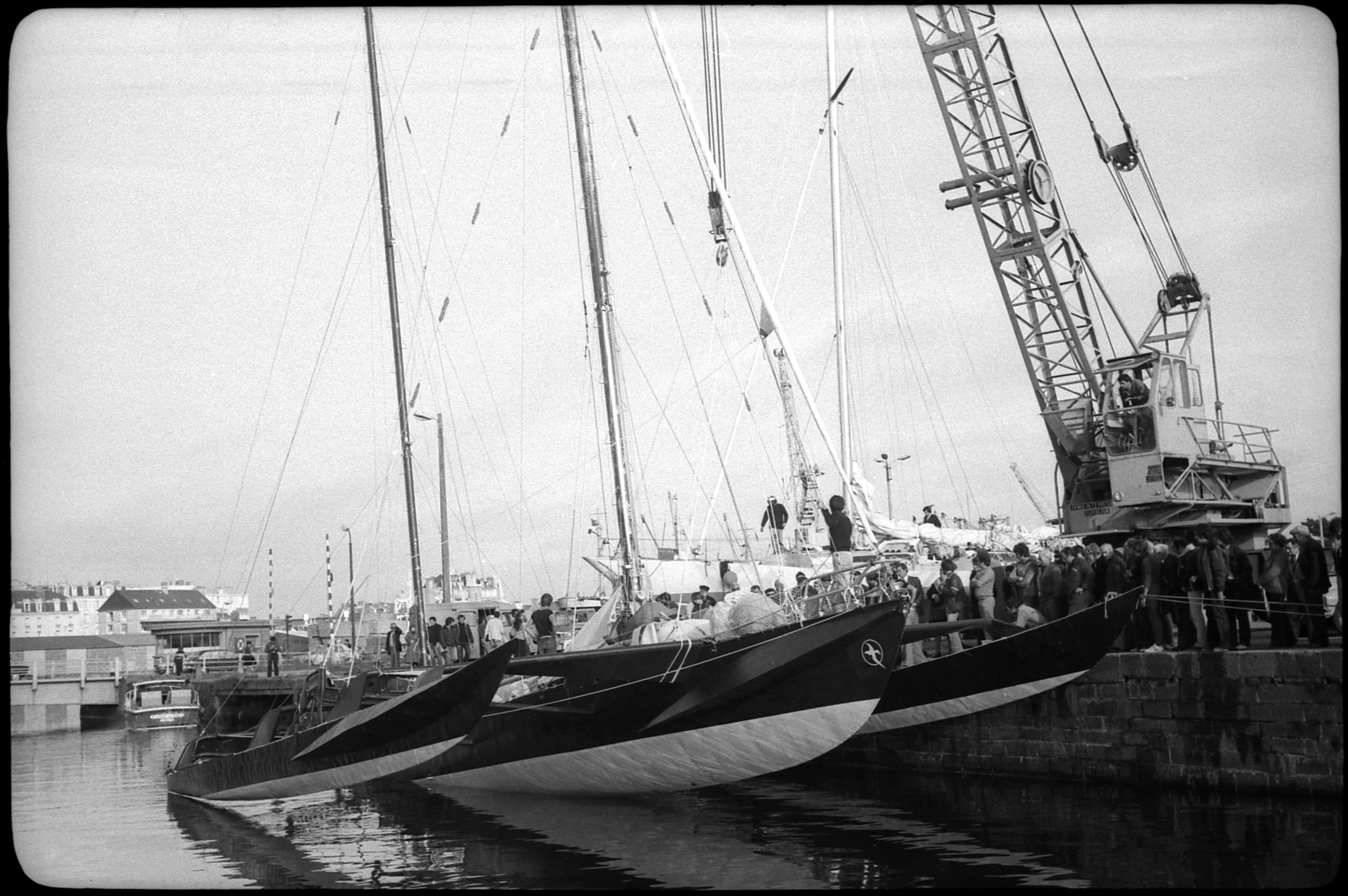
- Manureva some days before the start of the first Route du Rhum.
- Other names: Pen Duick IV
- Designer(s): André Allègre
- Builder: La Perrière; Lorient, France
- Launched: 1968
- Owner(s): Éric Tabarly, Alain Colas
- Fate: Vessel lost at sea 1978

Racing career
- Skippers: Éric Tabarly, Alain Colas

Specifications
- Length: 20.80 m (68.2 ft) (LOA)

Manureva (originally named Pen Duick IV) was a custom-built racing trimaran famous for being the first oceangoing multihull racing sailboat, opening the path to the supremacy in speed of this kind of boat over monohulls. She won the 1972 Single-Handed Trans-Atlantic Race, skippered by Alain Colas, and was lost at sea with Colas during the first "Route du Rhum" transatlantic solo race in 1978.

== Construction ==
Pen Duick IV was the brainchild of Éric Tabarly, who had sailed in 1966 on a small trimaran designed by architect Derek Kelsall and had become convinced that multihulls had finally made decisive progress in being competitive in all wind situations. Looking to repeat his 1964 win, Tabarly commissioned Pen Duick IV for the 1968 Single-Handed Trans-Atlantic Race (OSTAR) on a design by French architect André Allègre.

With composite materials still in their infancy, Pen Duick IV's hulls were made of AG4 aluminium alloy. Unlike the present multihulls, which have flotation compartments or materials in the hulls to make them unsinkable, Pen Duick IV only featured foam filling in some of its compartments. This setup nonetheless proved adequate to keep the boat afloat when Tabarly collided with a cargo on the first night of the 1968 OSTAR and managed to limp back to England with structural damage. The hulls were linked by a tubular steel frame. Pen Duick IV was a pure racing machine, with Spartan amenities and even an unpainted hull that soon earned her the nickname "la pieuvre d’aluminium" (the aluminum octopus). It was designed for single-handed sailing and could be raced at its full potential with as few as three crew.

Tabarly rigged the boat as a Marconi ketch (Bermuda rig) on the basis of his 1964 win with the same rig on Pen Duick II. However, Pen Duick IV featured another radical innovation in the form of swiveling masts, decades before the technology became mainstream. These masts did eventually prove too weak and were soon replaced with conventional ones.

Construction started in 1967 at La Perrière shipyard in Lorient, France. Work was slowed down by the social unrest of May 1968 and the boat was finished only two weeks before the start of the OSTAR.

After Alain Colas bought Pen Duick IV from Tabarly in 1970, he eventually carried out extensive modifications in 1973 to better handle the Southern Ocean in his upcoming round-the-world record attempt. Larger masts and a second forward cross-member were fitted, the front hulls were widened, the boat was painted for the first time and was renamed Manureva. No other major modifications would be carried out before the boat was lost at sea in 1978.

== Racing history ==
Despite its lack of readiness, Pen Duick IV showed such speed in its accelerated trials before the 1968 OSTAR that Tabarly had high hopes of a win. However, a collision with a cargo on the first night put an early end to the dream. Tabarly ran a few other Atlantic races that year but had to retire after dismasting. He then decided to participate in two Pacific races in 1969: San Francisco to Tokyo on a new Pen Duick V and the Transpacific Yacht Race immediately afterwards on Pen Duick IV. To this end, he sailed the trimaran to San Francisco through the Panama Canal in the spring of 1969. Tabarly was not aware that multihulls were not eligible to participate in the Transpac but shadowed the race anyway, starting with the official participants. With Alain Colas and Olivier de Kersauson as crew, he finished more than 20 hours ahead of official winner Blackfin and set an unofficial course record of 8 days, 13 hours.

Colas bought Pen Duick IV from Tabarly in 1970 and sailed it back to France single-handed to gain experience for the 1972 Single-Handed Trans-Atlantic Race. The preparation paid off; Colas and Pen Duick IV won the OSTAR handily. On the way back to France, Colas attempted to break the record set in 1905 by Atlantic but fell short with a time of 17 days and 8 hours, more than five days off the mark.

After refitting the boat and renaming her Manureva, meaning "bird of journey", Colas embarked in 1973 on an attempt to break the record for a single-handed circumnavigation with a stop in Sydney and succeeded, completing the journey in 169 days at sea.

For the 1976 OSTAR, Colas commissioned the purpose-built Club Méditerranée. His brother Jean-François entered to run on Manureva but was unable to participate due to damage to one of the hulls.

== Disappearance ==
Colas returned to Manureva for the first edition of the Route du Rhum in 1978. This race runs 3,510 miles (5,650 km) on a great circle route from Saint-Malo (France) to Pointe-à-Pitre (Guadeloupe, France) and takes place every four years, in the month of November. After the start on 5 November, and after having passed the Azores on the 16th, the skipper sent his last radio message in which he reported that he was having a good trip. He was sailing at the head of the race, among the leaders and he also mentioned a storm was approaching. He was lost at sea with his boat.

== Song ==
A song "Manureva" was written by Serge Gainsbourg in French and interpreted by Alain Chamfort, in tribute to the trimaran and its skipper. The song was released as a single on 15 September 1979, and on the album Poses later the same year. It is one of Alain Chamfort's greatest successes. The song also boosted the fame of the trimaran. In 2022, French singer Calogero, in his album Centre Ville (deluxe version), sings the song "Manureva", as a reference to the disappearance of the boat.

== See also ==
- List of multihulls

== Sources ==
- Éric Tabarly
- Alain Colas
