= Bulb keel =

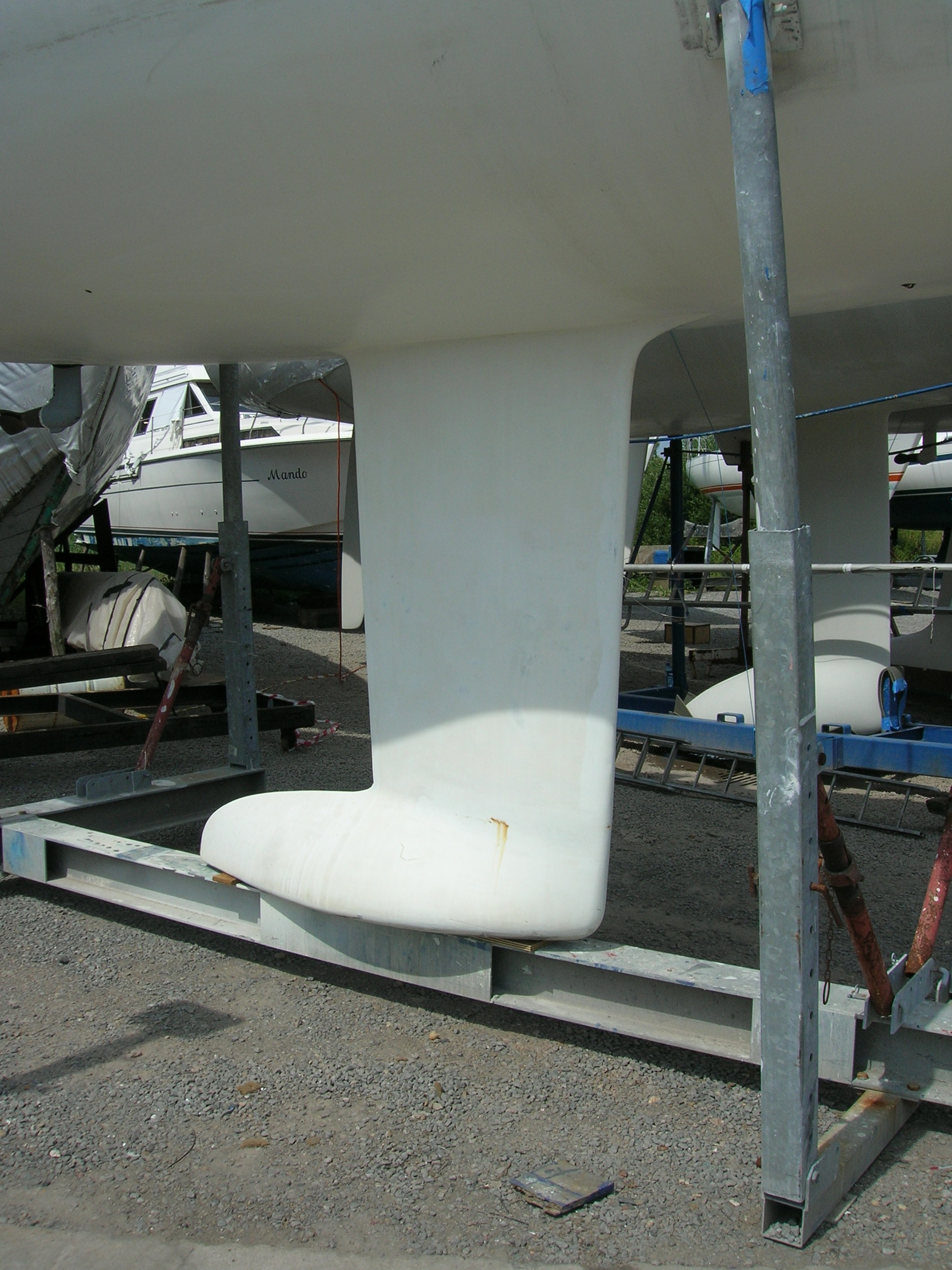
Flat Keel bulb

A bulb keel is a keel, usually made with a high aspect ratio foil, that contains a ballast-filled bulb at the bottom, usually teardrop shaped. The purpose of the bulb keel is to place the ballast as low as possible, therefore gaining the maximum possible amount of leverage and thus the most righting moment. An example of a class of boats that use a bulb keel is the International 110 racing class, which uses a 300 lb (136 kg) cast iron bulb keel on a boat whose minimum racing weight is 910 lb (414 kg).

Since bulb keels work best on long, thin keels or daggerboards, they are generally not used on sailboats intended for shallow waters, but are most often found on offshore racing craft. Daggerboards built like bulb keels are often referred to as "lifting keels", and they can be retracted into the boat to reduce the draft, and to allow the boat to be loaded onto a trailer. Lifting keels are also more likely to be found on craft built for speed, as a winch or a set of pulleys is required to provide purchase to lift the heavy keel.

Some boats with lifting keels go so far as to allow the keel to be canted side to side, allowing the bulb to be placed to windward to reduce heel in high winds; this type of keel is called a canting keel, and is used in the newest Volvo Ocean Race's Volvo Open 70 class yachts. It is also possible to shape the bulb into a horizontal foil, called a winged keel.

When the bulb protrudes past the leading edge of the keel, it is called a "T-bulb". It offers better performance (like required for racing), but is prone to hook into flotsam (like kelp or discarded fishing nets).

== See also ==
- Bulbous bow
