= Alain Colas =

French sailor (1943–1978)

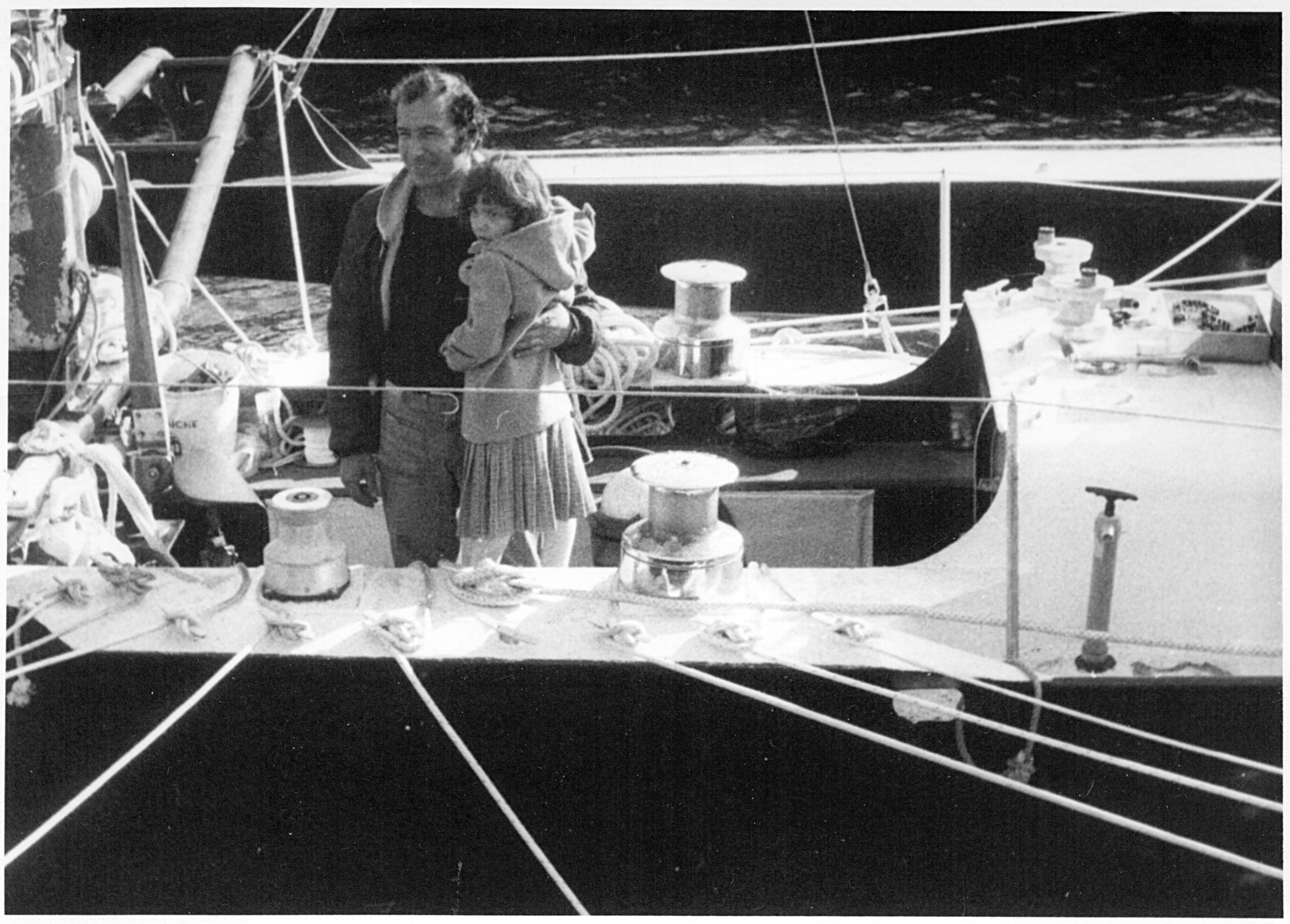
- Manureva, a few days before the start of the first Route du Rhum
- Born: 16 September 1943; Clamecy, Nièvre, France
- Disappeared: at sea
- Status: Missing for 47 years, 10 months and 13 days

Alain Colas (16 September 1943 – 16 November 1978) was a French sailor, the first to complete a solitary round-the-world race in a multihull. He met Éric Tabarly in Sydney in 1967, and bought Pen Duick IV from him in 1970, and won the "Transat" in 1972. The same year, he started the construction of a 72m (236 feet) 4-masted monohull for the 1976 "Transat".

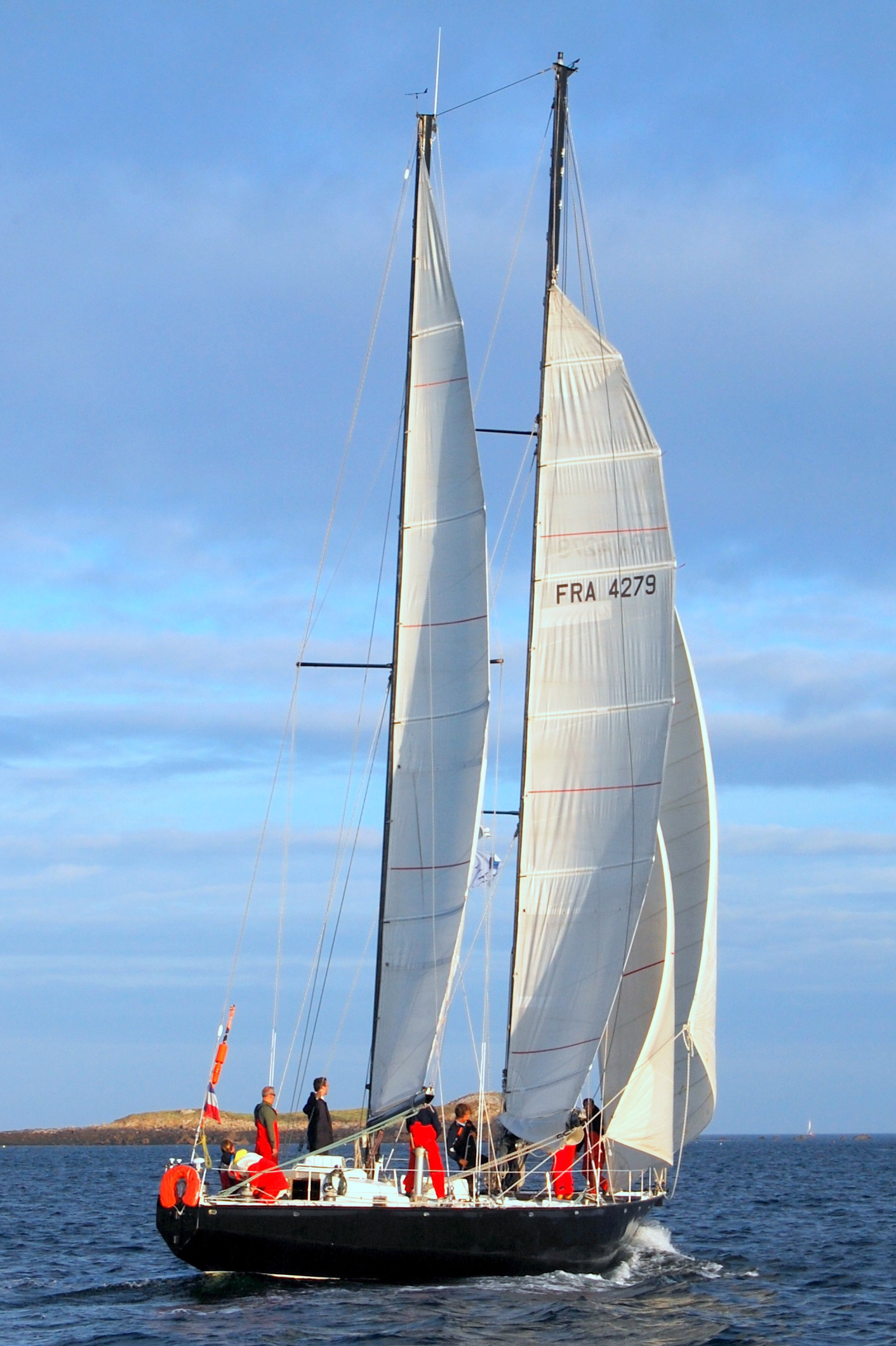
Pen Duick III in 2008

He broke his right ankle, underwent 22 surgeries, and got back on his feet for the solitary transatlantic race. Éric Tabarly won, and Alain Colas arrived 2nd, but was classed 5th. On 5 November 1978, he took part in his last race, the first Route du Rhum. On 16 November 1978, as he passed the Azores, he sent his last radio message, saying that everything was alright and sailing well. Neither his boat Manureva nor his body were ever found.

== Honours ==
- Chevalier (Knight) of the Order of the Legion of Honour

== See also ==
- List of people who disappeared mysteriously at sea
- Manureva (Pen Duick IV)
- Phocéa
- INA (French video archives) on Alain Colas
