= CBTF Technology =

US marine technology company

- Industry: Marine Technology
- Founded: San Diego, US (1991)
- Founder: Matt Brown, Bill Burns, Alberto Calderon, Peter Isler, Chuck Robinson
- Headquarters: San Diego, United States
- Products: CBTF
- Website: www.cbtfco.com

CBTF Technology is the patent holder of canting keel technology used in the design of some notable racing yachts in recent years, including Wild Oats XI and Alfa Romeo. The company licenses its canting ballast, twin foil technology to yacht designers who choose to incorporate it into their designs.
