= Meteor III (yacht) =

Schooner

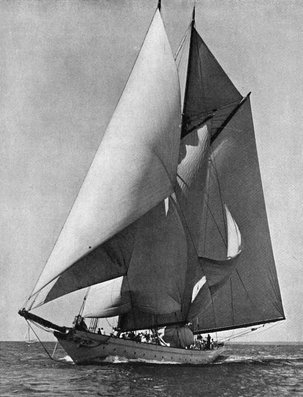

The launch of the Imperial German royal yacht Meteor III was filmed by cameraman James H. White (1872–1944), for the Edison Manufacturing Company, sent by famous scientist / inventor Thomas Edison (1847–1931), as an early newsreel and motion pictures / film

Meteor was the third Imperial German royal yacht of that name to be owned by German Emperor Wilhelm II (1859–1941, reigned 1888–1918). It was a schooner designed by A. Carey Smith and H. G. Barbey and built at the Townsend & Downey shipyard on Shooters Island off Newark Bay and the North Shore of Staten Island, on the western coast of Upper New York Bay / New York Harbor.

It was launched at a grand ceremony on 25 February 1902 in which it was christened by eldest first daughter at age 18 years old of Alice Roosevelt (1884–1980), before a crowd of hundreds which included her father, 26th President Theodore Roosevelt (1858–1919, served 1901–1909), and Prince Heinrich (Henry) of Prussia (and Imperial Germany, 1862–1929), younger brother of the Kaiser Wilhelm II.

The yacht was used occasionally for racing but was not successful and was eventually sold to Dr Harries only seven years later in 1909 who changed its name to the Nordstern. It then passed through the hands of a series of owners including the press baron Maurice Bunau-Varilla. In 1940, it was requisitioned by the United States Navy and was then scrapped after the Second World War (1939/1941-1945). The final name that she carried was the Aldebaran.
