= Kaiser's Cup =

Transatlantic yacht race

Kaiser's Cup was a yachting race across the Atlantic between Sandy Hook, New Jersey (USA) and The Lizard (Cornwall, England). This was a famous sailing race of the day, and was won by the yacht Atlantic which held the record for nearly a century

In 1905 out of eleven contenders, it was won by the yacht Atlantic, which set a record time of 12 days and 4 hours. for the crossing. The race was the subject of the 1905 silent film Start of Ocean Race for Kaiser's Cup, and the book, Atlantic: The Last Great Race of Princes. Second place was taken by the yacht Hamburg. Third place went to the RSY Valhalla who despite being by far the largest participant, came in a respectable ‘’easy third’’, having crossed the Atlantic under sail in 14 days and 2 hours. News of the race was published in the New York Times the London Times , and the Los Angeles Herald newspapers.

The Imperial German aviso SMS Pfeil greeted the competitors at the end of the race, and the yachts crossed between land and the ship. The Atlantic was captained by Charlie Barr and directed by navigator and tactician Frederick Maxfield Hoyt, who also helped design her and was sailed to victory with a clear lead – the next contender did not come in for another day. This was roughly a 3000 nautical mile race, and Atlantic had averaged about 10 knots. This record for a sailing monohull on this route stood until 2002.

Some of the back history of this type of racing goes back to the 1860s, when some sailing yacht clubs raced across the Atlantic Ocean, so the type of race had some popularity, and yacht racing was popular among European heads of state. In this case, the Kaiser of Germany wanted to sponsor a race of this type and his entry would be the yacht Hamburg (previously known as Rainbow). He put no restrictions on size or rig, and there was no handicap. In this type of racing, the yacht and crew were sponsored by the patron who did not necessarily go on the voyage, rather their boats and crews competed against each other. The yachts were not necessarily stripped down racers; one contender had amenities such as a grand piano, a dining room for 30, and fireplaces. Even the Atlantic, which was commissioned in 1903 was intended for taking the owner for trips around Europe - fast but also well equipped with steam heating and refrigeration, steam-powered winches, a mahogany interior, and three interior bathrooms, with a crew of about 40.

== Contenders ==
The race had 11 contenders with different types of sailing vessels.

Contenders:

- Ailsa
- Apache
- Atlantic
- Endymion
- Fleur de Lys
- Hamburg
- Hildegarde
- Sunbeam
- Thistle
- Utowana
- Valhalla
- Volunteer

== Centenary ==
The 2005 Rolex Transatlantic Challenge celebrated the 100th anniversary of the race, and a new record was set by the Mari-Cha IV.
