= Middle Sea Race =

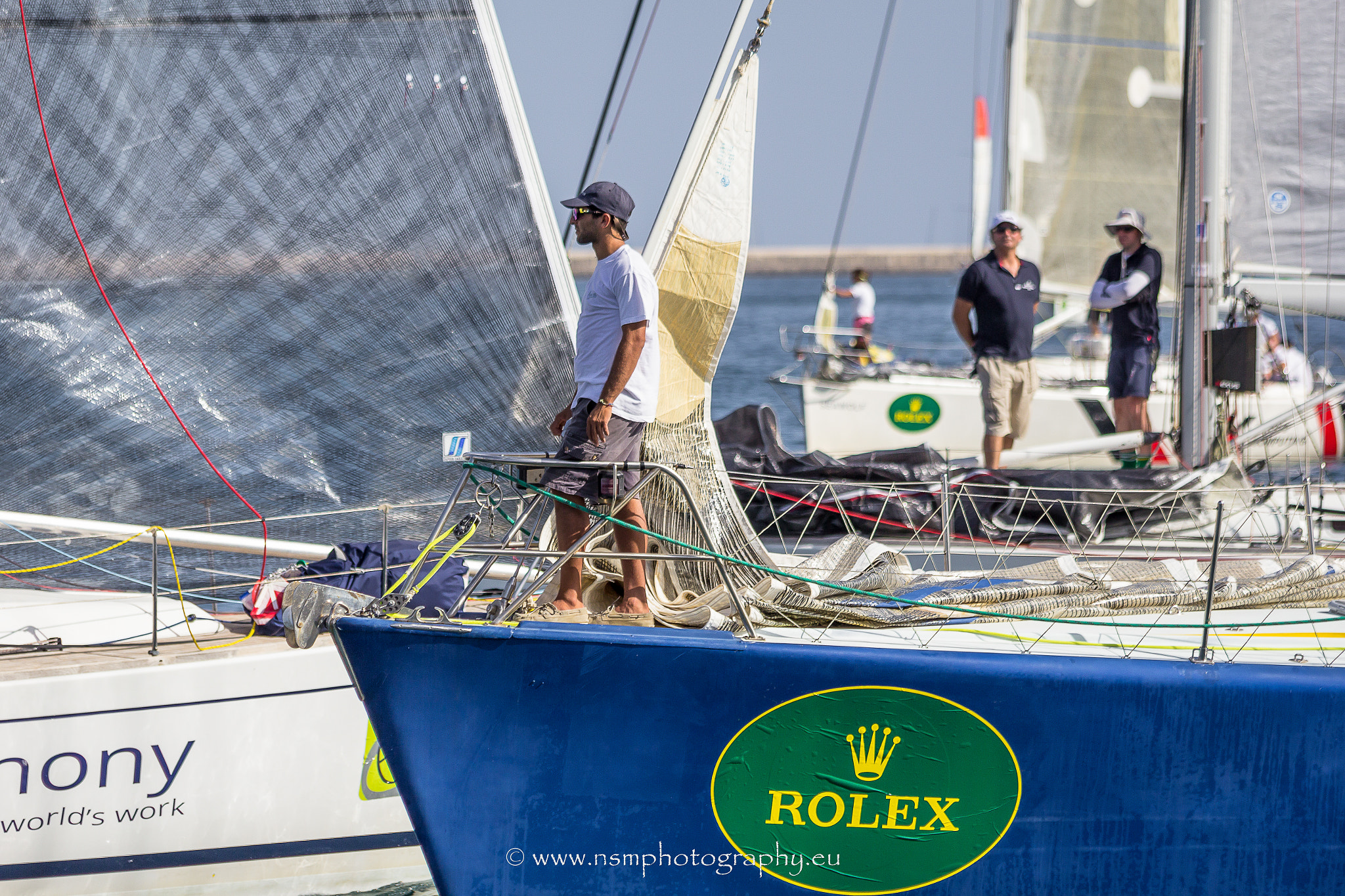
On board a yacht during the 2014 Middle Sea Race

The Middle Sea Race, or Rolex Middle Sea Race for sponsorship reasons, is a yacht race organised by the Royal Malta Yacht Club. The race was co-founded in 1968 by the Royal Malta Yacht Club and the Royal Ocean Racing Club.

The Rolex Middle Sea Race was created as the result of sporting rivalry between two British yachtsmen residing in Malta, Alan Green and Jimmy White, and two Maltese sailors, Paul and John Ripard. both members of the Royal Malta Yacht Club.

Alan (who would go on to become Secretary of the Royal Ocean Racing Club) and Jimmy proposed a longer course than was typical in the region, and one designed to offer an exciting competition in windier autumn conditions. The original suggestion was for a course that would start in Malta and finish in Syracuse, Sicily, in one year and then start in Syracuse and finish in Malta, the next.

In an inspired moment, Paul insisted that the race should be centred on Malta, both starting and finishing there. The course was now, essentially, a clockwise circumnavigation of Sicily including Lampedusa, Pantelleria and the Egadi and Aeolian islands. It would be slightly longer than the RORC’s own famous offshore event, the Fastnet Race, sponsored by Rolex since 2001.

The 607-mile (977 km) race starts and finishes in Malta, and takes the fleet in anti-clockwise around Sicily, Italy.
