= Canting keel =

Form of sailing ballast

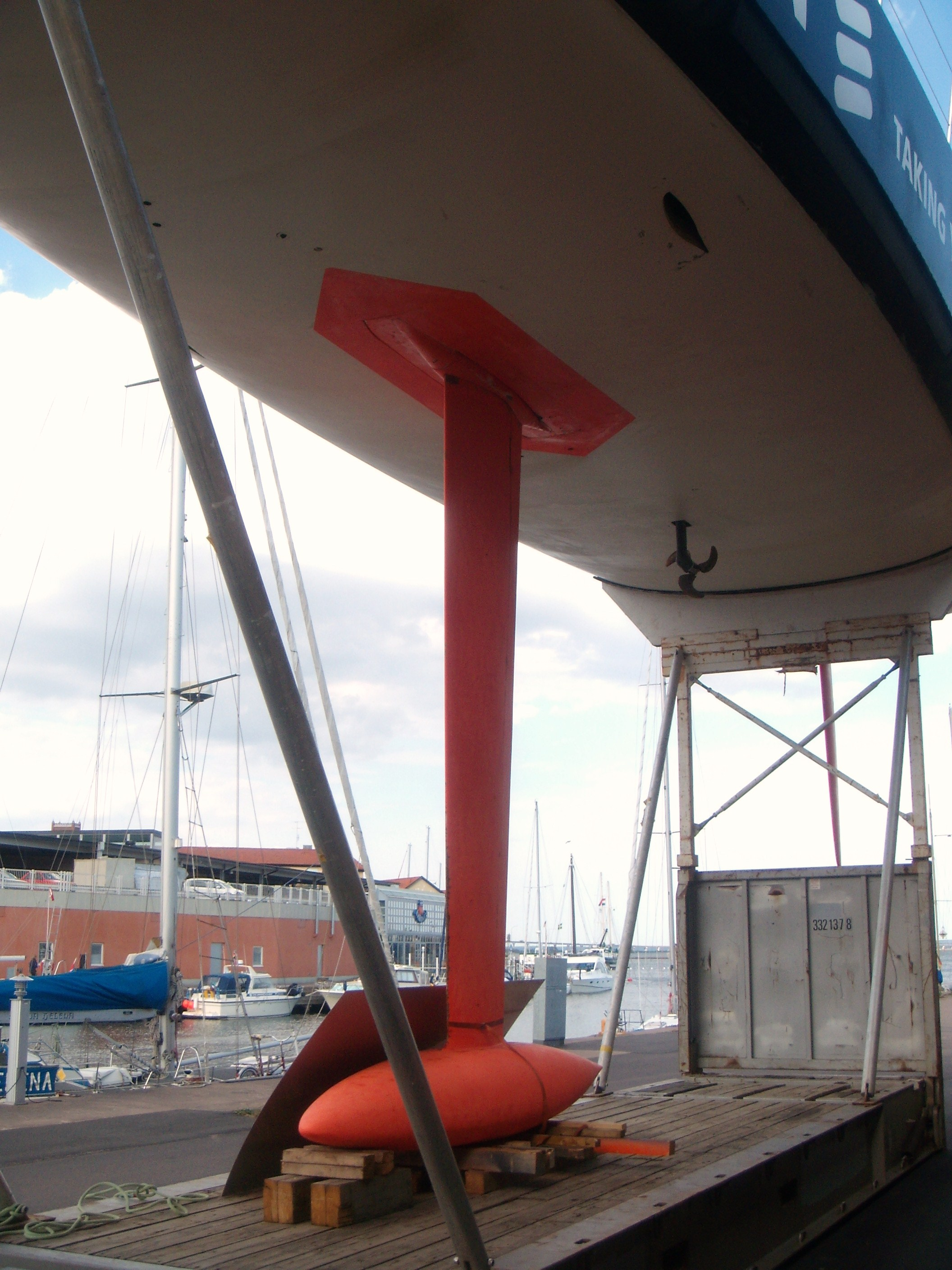
A canting keel on the VO 70 from Ericsson Racing Team

A canting keel is a form of sailing ballast, suspended from a rigid canting strut beneath the boat, which can be swung to windward of a boat under sail, in order to counteract the heeling force of the sail. The canting keel must be able to pivot to either port or starboard, depending on the current tack.

== Purpose and history ==
The traditional yacht keel performs four functions:

- the development of lateral water force to resist lateral aerodynamic force from sails and superstructure,
- the physical housing of ballast load as low as possible,
- roll-damping to resist energy inputs from waves and disturbed water, and
- a contribution to directional stability.

The traditional fin keel, pointing straight down from the boat, provides no righting moment when the boat is level. The heeling force of the wind on the sails is therefore not counteracted until the boat has heeled over by a certain amount, moving the fixed keel to windward of the centerline. The purpose of the canting keel is to allow the boat to sail closer to level which generates maximum speed, by swinging the keel to windward and developing an adequate righting moment to keep the boat's angle of heel closer to level.

With the canting keel handling the ballast functions, lateral resistance and steering can be managed separately with a foil (or pair of foils, either on each side or fore and aft), such as daggerboards. This allows for much quicker maneuverability than traditional keelboats, with about half the weight usually required for ballast.

The first patent for a canting keel device was granted by Douglas Beardy on 8 May 1900.

The first yacht to have a canting keel was the "Fiery Cross" designed by Jim Young (New Zealand) in 1959. In this canting keel device, the lever was mounted inside the fin at an angle and at the top it was connected to a vertical shaft. When the shaft was twisted around its axis, a curved lever pressed against the inner walls of the fin and tilted it.

A version of the technology was invented and patented by CBTF Technology in the 1990s. The canting keel's first use in an offshore race was the 1991 Mini Transat on number 29 Fouesnant la Foret and then in the Vendee Globe of 1996-7 which Pete Goss completed in a 50 ft, Adrian Thompson-designed yacht named Aqua Quorum. Development of the yacht and the events of the Race are described in detail in Pete's subsequent book Close to the Wind. Subsequent use in major competition was in September 2004, when five boats using the canting keel in the Maxi Yacht Rolex Cup placed ahead of the previously unbeaten world champion Alfa Romeo. Alfa Romeo II, designed by Reichel/Pugh features a canting keel and fore-and-aft twin foils (CBTF).

A variation of the canting keel is the 3d keel invented by François Lucas in 1998, which allows movement in three directions (side to side, forward and aft, and side to side).

== Current use ==
Originally used in large maxi yachts such as the maxZ86, canting keels are now beginning to appear in smaller boats such as the Open 60, and the VO70 and Volvo Ocean 65 (Volvo Ocean 65) ocean racing classes, and the even smaller Schock 40 and Classe Mini. The Schock 40 owned by Tom Schock famously lost its keel and capsized, illustrating the fundamental problem with complicated keel design: without a keel, most boats cannot float upright.

The Volvo Open 70 class boats in the 2006 around-the-world Volvo Ocean Race are perhaps the most well known boats to use canting keels for ballast. While previous years' boats showed a few percent improvement in speed each race (the race is held every three years) the VO70 class are showing a 30% improvement in speed. The 6.5 ton ballast bulb, hanging over 16 feet (4.9 meters) below the water and capable of canting up to 40 degrees, produces a tremendous amount of righting moment (over 130,000 ft·lbf, or 176,000 N·m with the hull level), allowing the boat to reach speeds of over 30 knots.

== Disadvantages ==
The current canting keel technology is far from perfect. One area in particular, the plates sealing the opening through which the keel passes, are prone to leaks. Unlike a centerboard or daggerboard trunk, the opening for a canting keel must allow significant lateral motion, which requires sliding seals.

The boat movistar had problems on Leg 4 of the Volvo Ocean Race, 200 miles off Cape Horn, during the night on 2 March 2006. It sprung a significant leak when the sliding plates that covered the keel opening fell off in the middle of the night. This was a problem that had occurred earlier. movistar's aft keel pivot broke loose and began flooding the boat. They made repairs in Ushuaia on the Beagle Channel. Later on, in Leg 7 the same problem occurred in the north Atlantic. This time the decision was made to abandon ship, and the crew transferred to ABN AMRO TWO. movistar continued to broadcast its position for several days, but an aerial search failed to find the vessel, and it was lost.

In the 2006/2007 Velux 5 Oceans Race (a single-handed, round the world race), the Open 60 yacht Hugo Boss, skippered by Alex Thomson, had to be abandoned in the Southern Ocean due to the snapping of the hydraulic rams that controlled the keel, which caused the catastrophic failure of the keel. When this failure caused the yacht to nearly capsize, the boat was abandoned; Thomson was rescued by fellow competitor Mike Golding. On 25 November 2006, the boat's Sat C transponder stopped transmitting. The abandoned hull was found washed up on the shores of Patagonia 9 years later.

In December 2016, Wild Oats XI has retired from the 72nd Sydney to Hobart yacht race, citing a broken hydraulic ram. Race spokesman Bruce Montgomery said Wild Oats XI was unable to move its keel after a hydraulic ram broke. "It's the gear that operates its canting keel, which is the keel that swings under the boat," he said.

== America's Cup ==
There were rumors that the 2007 International America's Cup Class yacht Alinghi might have had a canting keel. This would have given Alinghi an advantage over its challenger for the 2007 America's Cup, unless the challenger, Emirates Team New Zealand, also had a swinging keel. The America's Cup Class Committee, chaired by Ken McAlpine, issued a ruling on 8 May 2007 which stated that canting keels and other movable appendages were specifically prohibited.

== Alternative designs ==
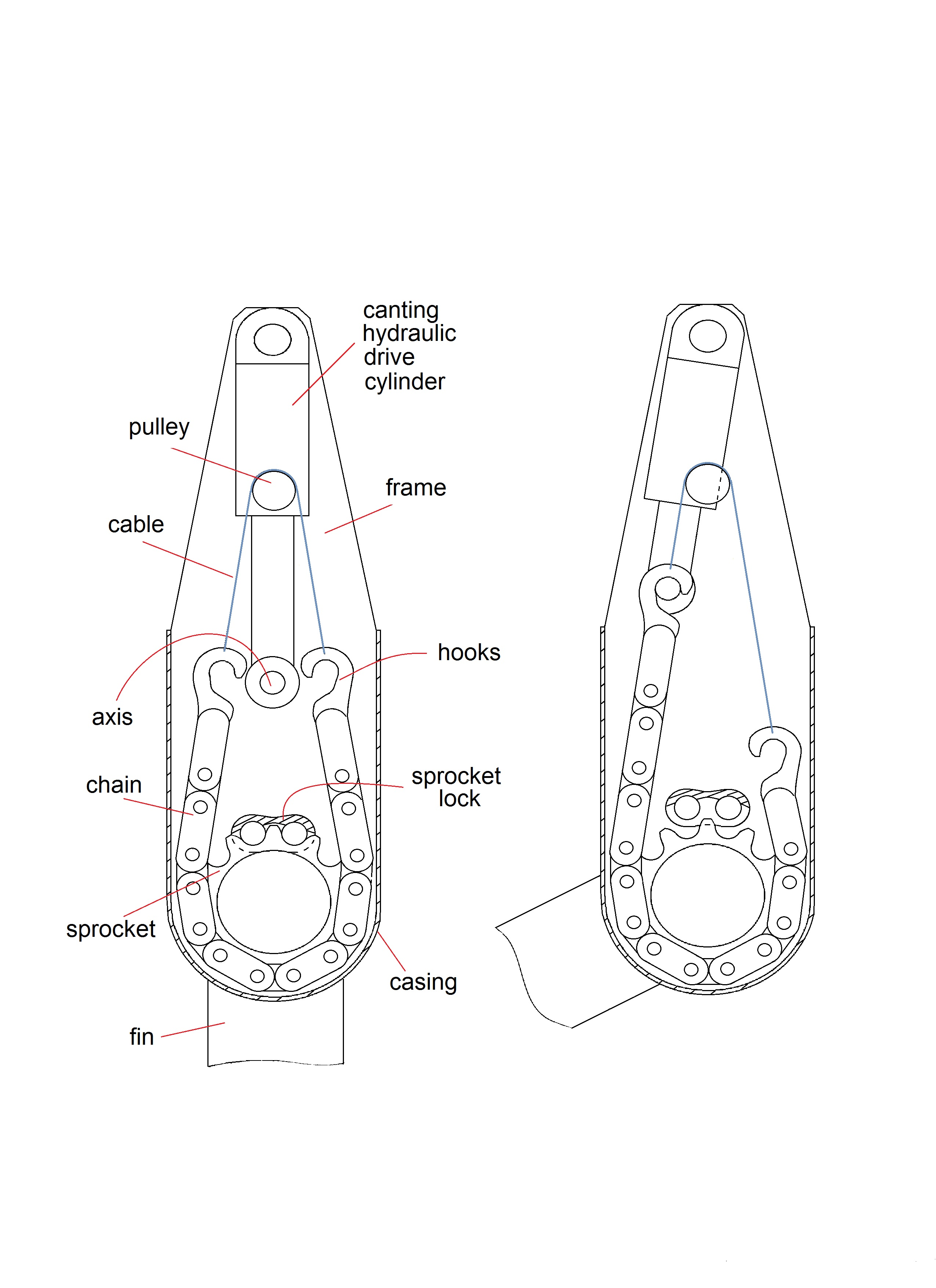
canting keel with chain and tilt the fin 90 degrees or more

In recent years, canting keel devices have been proposed in which the drive is not a lever, as it was before, but something else. One of these devices is a canting keel with a chain drive, which is able to tilt the fin 90 degrees or more. The author of this invention is Boris Kuchukov. The fin and ballast keel must be in the air when a yacht equipped with such a device is moving. In theory, this should increase the speed of the yacht.
