= Atlantic (yacht) =

Three-masted schooner

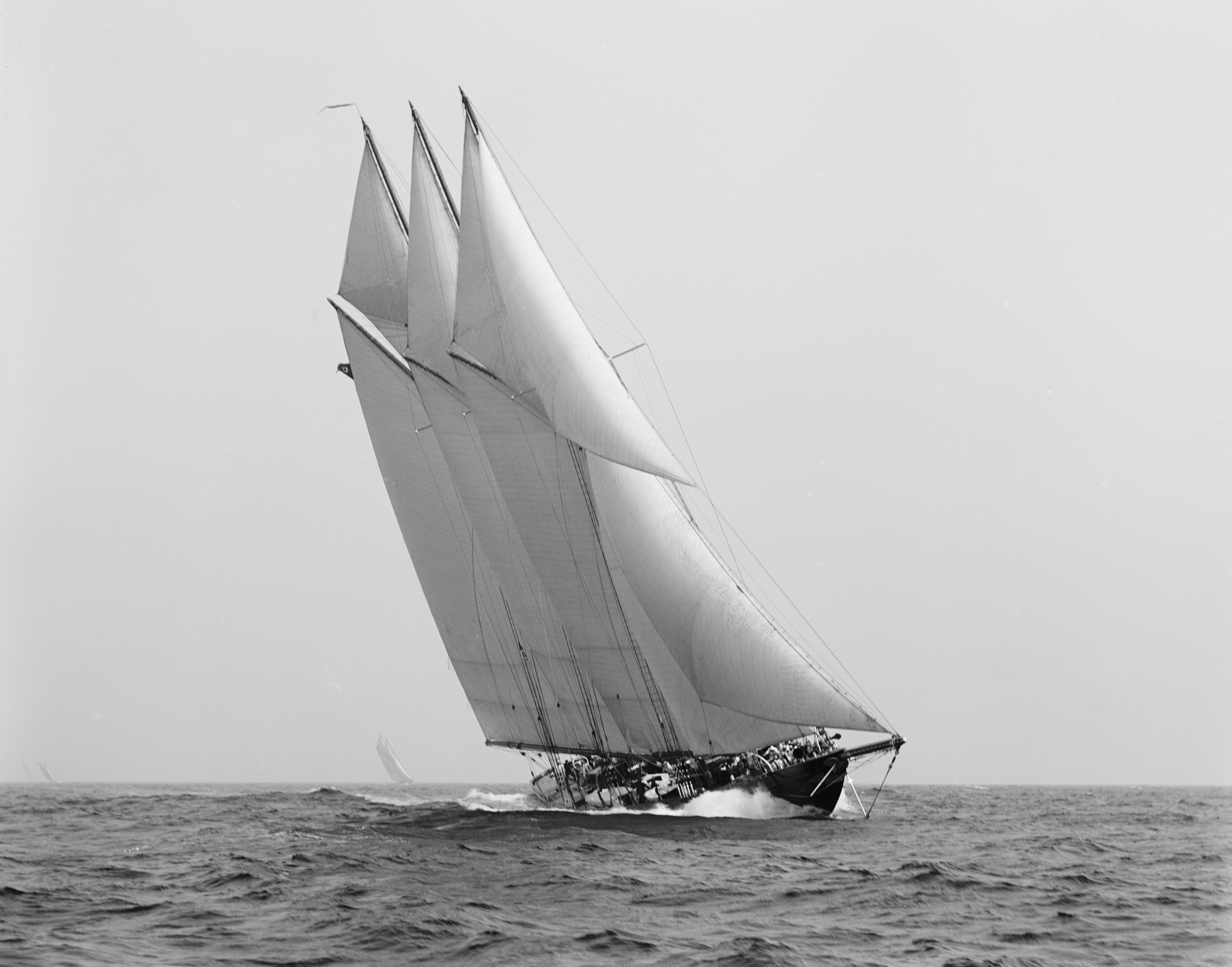

History

United States
- Owner: Wilson Marshall
- Builder: Townsend & Downey
- Launched: 1903-07-28
- Honours and awards: Kaiser's Cup, 1905
- Fate: Scrapped (1982-01-30)

General characteristics
- Type: three mast gaff-rigged schooner
- Displacement: 303 tonnes
- Length: 69.40 m (227.7 ft)
- Beam: 8.85 m (29.0 ft)
- Draught: 4.90 m (16.1 ft)
- Installed power: steam and sail
- Sail plan: 1,720 m^{2} (18,500 sq ft)

The Atlantic was a three-masted schooner built in 1903 by Townsend and Downey shipyard on Shooters Island, New Jersey. She was designed by William Gardner, and Frederick Maxfield Hoyt for Wilson Marshall.

Atlantic was skippered by Charlie Barr, accompanied by navigator and tactician Frederick Maxfield Hoyt, when she set the record for fastest transatlantic sail passage in the 1905 Kaiser's Cup race. The monohull record remained unbroken for nearly 100 years.

Her speed and elegance have made her the subject of a book.

== Trans-Atlantic record ==
In 1905, Kaiser Wilhelm II of Germany proposed a sailing race across the North Atlantic and put forward a solid gold cup to be presented to the winner. Eleven boats including the Kaiser's yacht Hamburg, George Lauder Jr's schooner the Endymion which was the record holder going into the race, and the schooner Atlantic skippered by Charlie Barr, with navigator and tactician Frederick Maxfield Hoyt took part.

The competitors encountered strong winds and gales which ensured a fast passage time, and all eleven boats finished the race. Atlantic won, breaking the existing record with a time of 12 days, 4 hours, 1 minute and 19 seconds. The record stood for 75 years until broken by Eric Tabarly sailing the trimaran Paul Ricard. However, Atlantic's monohull record stood until broken in 1997 by the yacht Nicorette completing a solo crossing in 11 days 13 hours 22 minutes.

For vessels competing in an organized regatta (as Atlantic had, as opposed to alone, where a challenger can wait for optimal sailing conditions), the record held for nearly 100 years, until broken by Mari-Cha IV’s crossing during the 2005 Rolex Transatlantic Challenge.

== United States Navy Service ==
Following the United States declaration of war on Germany in April 1917, Atlantic was acquired by the Navy on 10 June 1917 and commissioned as USS Atlantic II (SP 651) on 28 July 1917.

She was assigned to Patrol Force, Atlantic Fleet, and cruised along the east coast until November 1917 when she was assigned duty as a guard ship at Yorktown, Va., and tender to a squadron of submarine chasers. In January 1919, she was assigned to the 5th Naval District.

She was decommissioned on 11 June 1919 at the Norfolk Navy Yard in Portsmouth, Virginia. She was sold to a private owner on 24 July 1919.

== Coast Guard Service ==
Atlantic was acquired by the Coast Guard and commissioned on 1 April 1941. She was assigned hull number WIX-271. She was assigned to Coast Guard Headquarters but was stationed at the United States Coast Guard Academy in New London, Connecticut where she was used for cadet training. She was decommissioned on 27 October 1947 and sold to a private owner on 10 September 1948.

== Later years ==
In 1953, the ship was towed to Wildwood, New Jersey where it was kept as a floating tea room, museum, and tourist attraction. She was neglected and sank in 1963 during a storm but was refloated in 1970. She deteriorated and sank at the dock in Norfolk, Virginia. In 1982, the wreckage was removed for the installation of a floating dry dock at Metro Machine Shipyard.

Her rudder is located at the Museum of Yachting in Newport, Rhode Island.

== Honors and awards ==
- Kaiser's Cup
- World War I Victory Medal
- American Defense Service Medal
- American Campaign Medal
- World War II Victory Medal

== Replica ==
Ed Kastelein commissioned a full-sized replica of Atlantic, built at the Van der Graaf BV shipyard (consulting engineer: Doug Peterson) in Hardinxveld-Giessendam (Netherlands). She was launched in March 2008, and the schooner was completed in June 2010.

Sophie Kastelein-Bouakel contributor, designed and built the interior of the Atlantic replica.

Michael Vedder designed and built the interior of the Atlantic replica.

== See also ==
- Yacht racing
- 2005 Rolex Transatlantic Challenge
- List of large sailing yachts
- List of schooners
