= Charlie Barr =

Sailing skipper

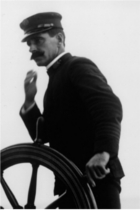
A picture of Charles Barr in 1903

Charles Barr (11 July 1864 – 24 January 1911), was an accomplished sailing skipper who three times captained winning America's Cup yachts.

== Early life ==
Charlie Barr was born in Gourock, Scotland in 1864 and first apprenticed as a grocer before working as a commercial fisherman. In 1884, he took a job with his older brother John, delivering a sailing yacht, Clara, to America. Clara's racing success was such that in 1887, John was selected to skipper the Scottish challenger, Thistle, the representative of the Royal Clyde Yacht Club; Charlie served as a member of the crew. Thistle was soundly defeated by Volunteer. In the process, however, the brothers Barr were introduced to Nathanael Herreshoff, and Charlie Barr's yachting career was launched. Charlie Barr would sail Herreshoff designs for much of the rest of his professional sailing life.

== America's Cup success ==
Captain Charles Barr was skipper of the yacht Columbia in 1899 and defeated Sir Thomas Lipton's Shamrock. Two years later, in 1901, Charlie Barr was again at the helm against a Lipton sponsored yacht, Shamrock II, a 137 ft (42 m) Watson-designed cutter. In 1903, Barr was the captain of the winning yacht Reliance, one of the most famous racing yachts to be designed by Nathanael Herreshoff. Barr was inducted into the America's Cup Hall of Fame in 1993 and into the National Sailing Hall of Fame at San Diego yacht club, Point Loma, California, on 23 October 2011.

== Atlantic record ==
He is best known for setting the record for the fastest crossing by a sailing yacht of the Atlantic Ocean on the schooner Atlantic in the 1905 Kaiser's Cup Transatlantic Race. Barr made his crossing in 12 days, 4 hours, 1 minute, 19 seconds, an outright racing record that stood 75 years until Eric Tabarly's 1980 crossing on his aluminium trimaran Paul Ricard. Barr's monohull record stood for nearly 100 years until beaten in 1997 by the yacht Nicorette completing the crossing in 11 days 13 hours 22 minutes.

Barr died whilst visiting Southampton, England on 24 January 1911; he is buried in Southampton Old Cemetery.

Barr was inducted into the National Sailing Hall of Fame in 2011.
