= Barcola =

Barcola Barkovlje
- Neighbourhood
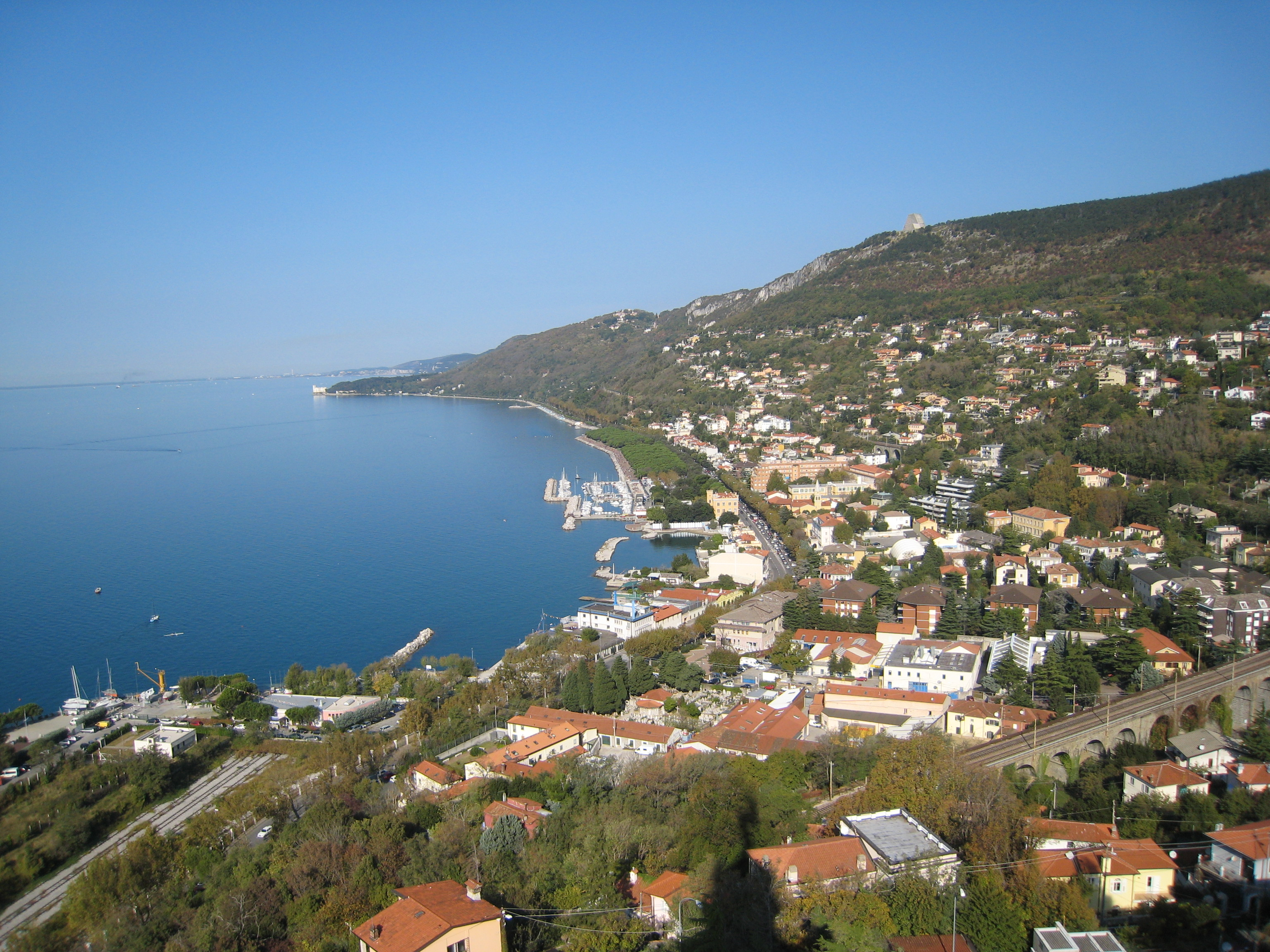
- View of Barcola from the Vittoria Light.

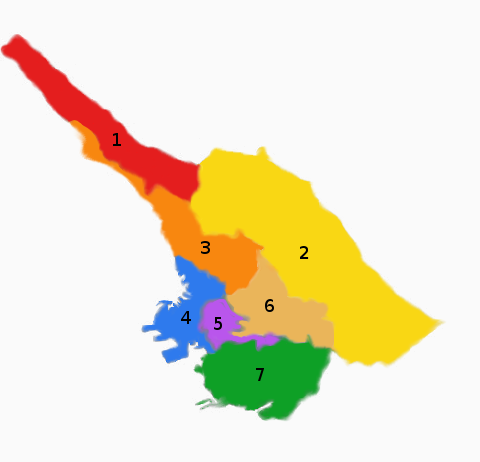
- Sections of Trieste, Barcola is located in section 3

- Location within Italy
- Coordinates: 45°40′46″N 13°45′16″E
- Country: Italy
- Region: Friuli-Venezia Giulia
- Municipality: Trieste

Population (2011)
  - Total: 2 801
- Postal code: 34136
- Area code: 040

Barcola (Slovene: Barkovlje) is a maritime neighbourhood of Trieste, Italy. It is a popular tourist destination with beaches and long promenades, near the Habsburg-established Miramare Castle.

Barcola is highly valued for the high quality of life and the free access to the sea. The long and partly shady 5 km long waterfront of Barcola serves as a recreation area and city bathing beach of Trieste and is connected to the city center, Miramare, Sistiana but also partly to Grado by bus lines and regular shipping services. Barcola has several small ports, especially Porticciolo di Barcola, where local professional fishermen also work and liner shipping operates.

The place is the center of the Barcolana regatta, currently the largest sailing race in the world. Known in Roman times as "Vallicula" or later as "Valcula", Barcola is known for its exclusive houses, the view from the green hills of the Gulf of Trieste, its long coastal promenade with extensive bathing and sports facilities and its hedonistically relaxed sporty mood. It is often referred to as the Adriatic Malibu.

== Geography ==
The Karst Plateau of the Trieste coastal region, on the edge of which is Barcola, is also considered the foothills of the Alps. The area of Barcola has a special microclimate (protected from cold winds by the mountains, early temperature increase in spring and long summer), the benefits of which have been valued since ancient times. Barcola is located between the suburb of Miramare and the Trieste district of Roiano. Together with Grignano, Miramare, Gretta, Roiano, Scorcola, Cologna and part of Guardiella, Barcola forms the administrative district 3 of the municipality of Trieste (Circoscrizione III). Barcola is reached from the centre of Trieste by taking viale Miramare in the direction of Venice. Barcola is about 3 km from the train station. There is no adequate continuous cycle path from the center to Barcola.

== Economy ==
=== Fishing ===
Since the settlement, the locals have been fishing because of its location on the Gulf of Trieste. While tuna and sardines used to be caught and processed, today the anchovies from Barcola (sardoni barcolani) are particularly in demand. These fish, which only appear at Sirocco, are in demand because of their particularly fine taste and fetch the highest prices. The fish larvae begin their growth in rivers such as the Po, later continue to mature in the central Adriatic, and then arrive as popular annual fish in the waters off Barcola in May or June.

For thousands of years, tuna have been caught by the locals in the upper Adriatic Sea, and thus also off Barcola. The swarms mostly consisted of little tunny (Euthynnus alletteratus). Increasing fishing prevented the migration of large schools of fish, often thousands of specimens, into the Gulf of Trieste. The last major local tuna catch was made in 1954 by the fishermen of Santa Croce, Contovello and Barcola.

Fishing in Barcola was often practiced by Slovenes, who had settled on the shores of the Adriatic since the eighth century AD. They also used the Cupa, a simply hollowed-out tree trunk, until World War II. Only when storm-proof harbors could be built under Habsburg administration in the 19th century did fishing experience a strong boom and fishermen increasingly bought their own larger fishing boats. After the First World War, the Slovenian fishermen were systematically disadvantaged by the Italian fascist policy and the Slovenian fishing cooperatives were abolished. Expropriations were carried out and the influx of non-local fishermen from Naples was financially supported. Today there are only a few local professional fishermen left.

On Viale Miramare 291 is the old fisherman's house, formerly a defensive structure of the city of Trieste, which is now used as a restaurant.

=== Tourist resort ===
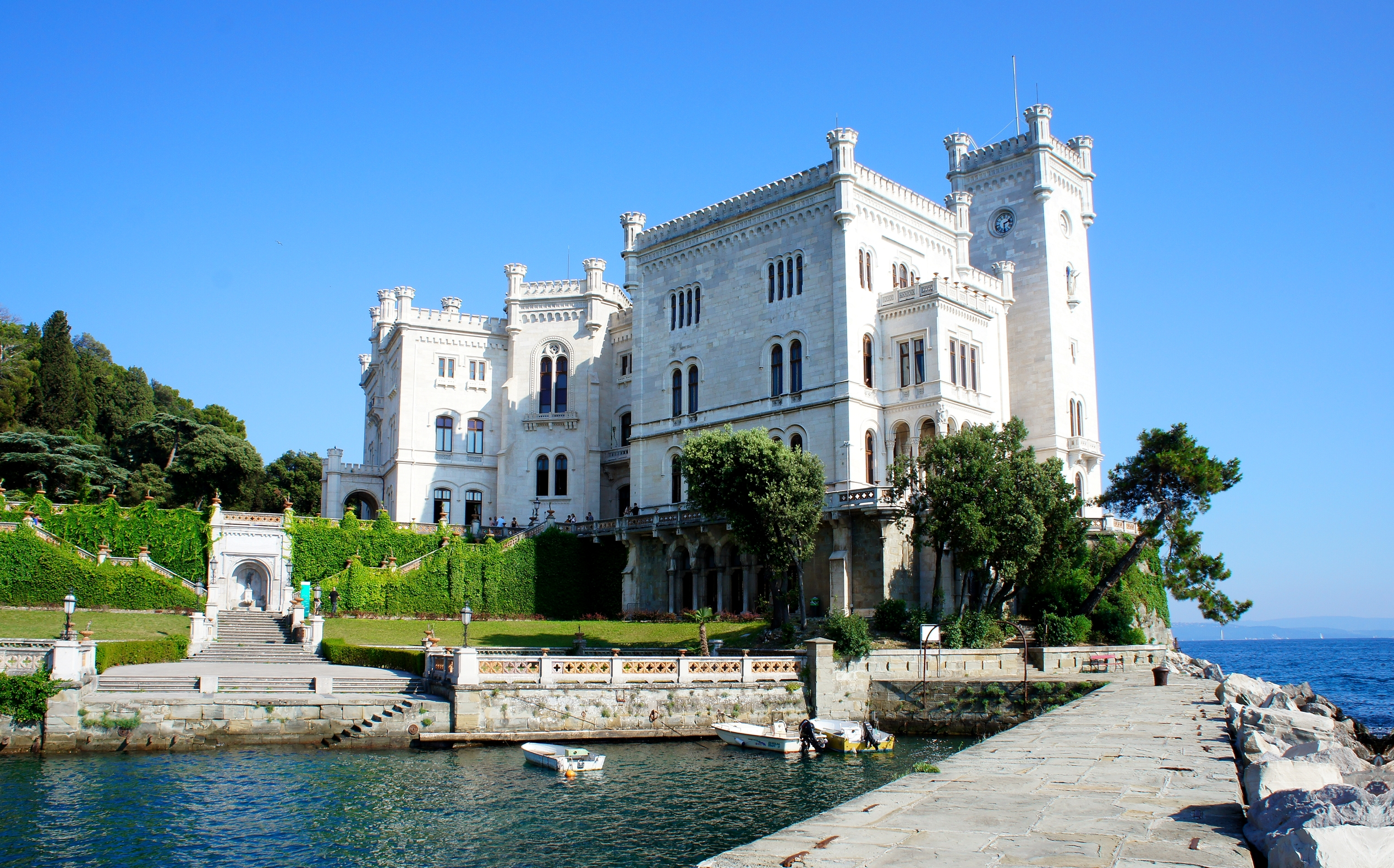
Miramare Castle

At the end of the 19th century, in Barcola, between the cemetery and the San Bartolomeo church, at about Viale Miramare 48, the remains of a magnificent Roman villa by the sea, worthy of a prince, were discovered. This complex of buildings, now known as Villa Maritima of Barcola, with a first construction phase in the second half of the first century BC, stretched along the coast and was divided into terraces into a representation area in which luxury and power were displayed, a separate one living area, a garden, some facilities open to the sea and a thermal bath. Extensions and renovations can be dated to the second half of the first century AD. The works of art and mosaics found are now in the Lapidario Tergestino Museum in the San Giusto Castle, although comparable works can only be found in Rome and Campania.

Fishing and the cultivation of wine and olives dominated the area until the 19th century. In 1826 Barcola had 418 inhabitants and people from Trieste increasingly began to build their summer residences in the settlement, including Archduke Maximilian's famous Miramare Castle, completed in 1860. At the end of the 19th century, Barcola increasingly took on the characteristics of a recreational area and there were inns and wine bars with arbor gardens and views of the sea.

== Culture and attractions ==
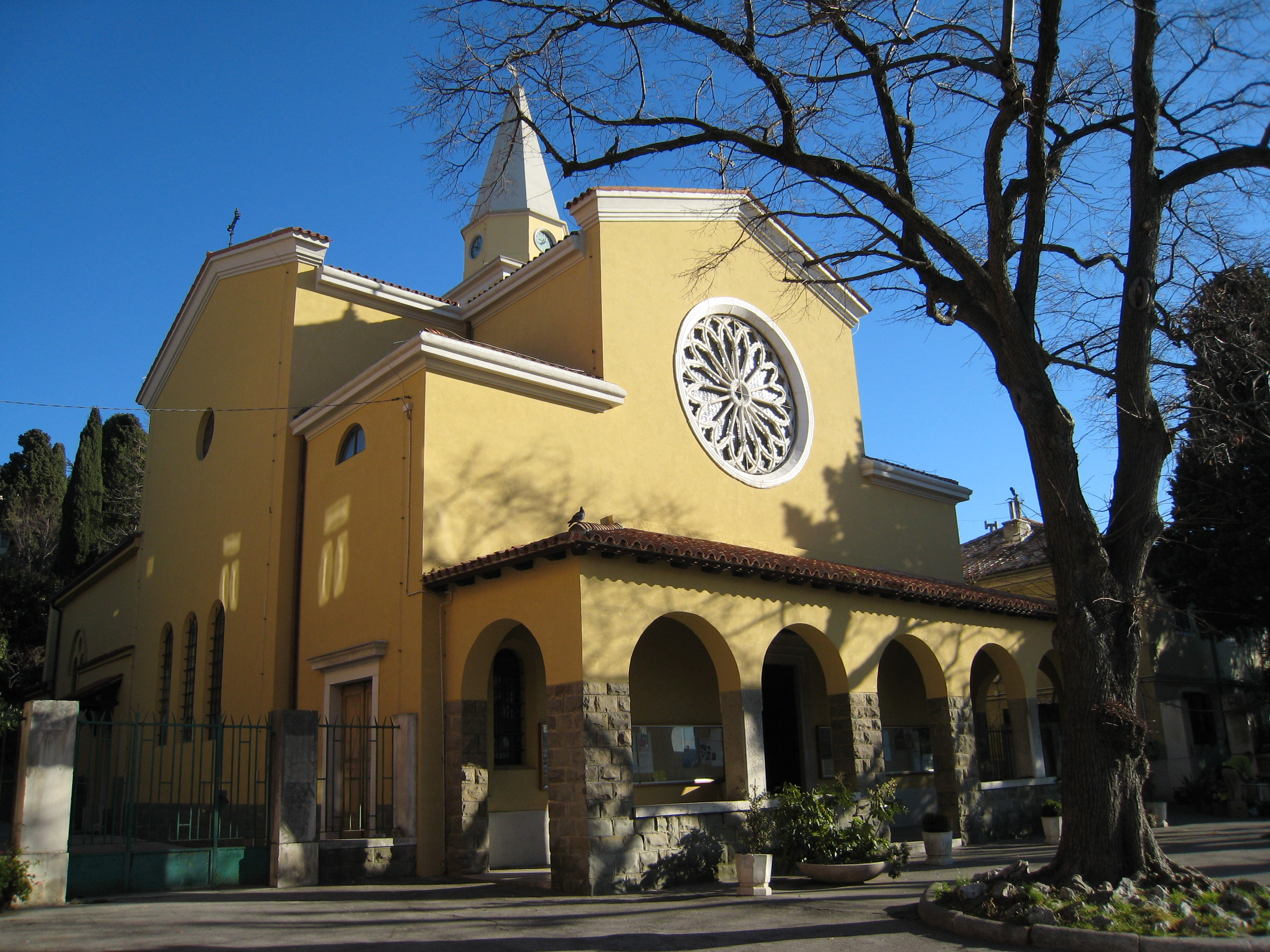
Church in Barcola

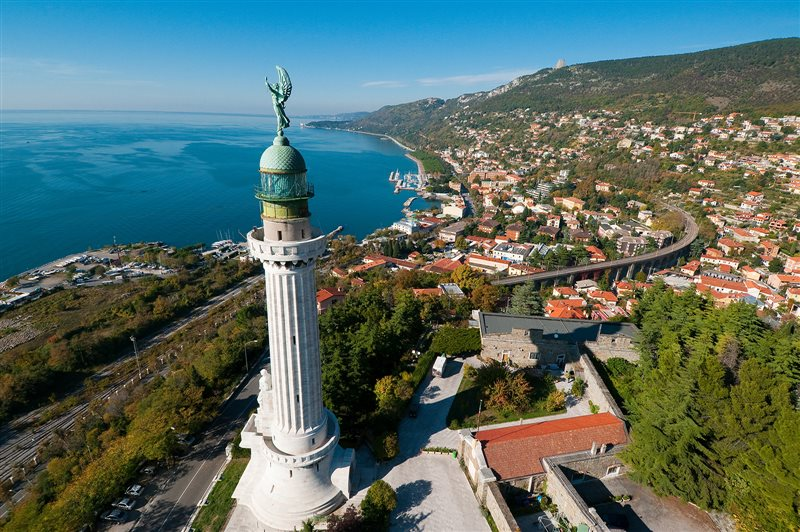
Vittoria Lighthouse panorama

In 1886 the Excelsior lido, which still exists today, was founded, followed by rowing clubs and other beach establishments, some of which still exist. The history of this model for many beach resorts began in 1886 when the Di Salvore family, who owned land in Barcola, received the concession to use the area around the former Roman Villa Maritima of Barcola. In 1890, the architect Edoardo Tureck was commissioned by Alessandro Cesare di Salvore, a shipowner, city councilor and theater director, to build a bathing facility at the natural sandbar, and in 1895 the hotel of the same name was also built across the street. The then well-known and flourishing bathhouse Excelsior, which passed on to other owners in the following years, was expanded several times, so in 1909 a small theater and a restaurant were integrated. According to a local story, the world champion in underwater fishing Claudio Martinuzzi learned in the 1980s at the Excelsior lido to swim. The beach complex, located on a historic Roman soil, has been converted into apartments or bath huts with a unique sandy beach in Trieste. A unique peculiarity for Italy is that due to the unique overlap of Habsburg and Italian law in the area of this historic beach complex, the beach is not public state property, but private property.

Above Barcola in Gretta is the Vittoria Lighthouse, which was built from 1923 to 1927 on top of the former imperial and royal fortification of Kressich. This fortification has various underground rooms and tunnels, protected from artillery attacks, all the way to Barcola. The lighthouse is one of the tallest lighthouses in the world.

In 1928 the Strada Costiera, which leads from Barcola to Sistiana, was opened. According to a ranking by the UNWTO, this part of the connecting road from Trieste to Venice is one of the most beautiful coastal roads in the world because of its panoramic views.

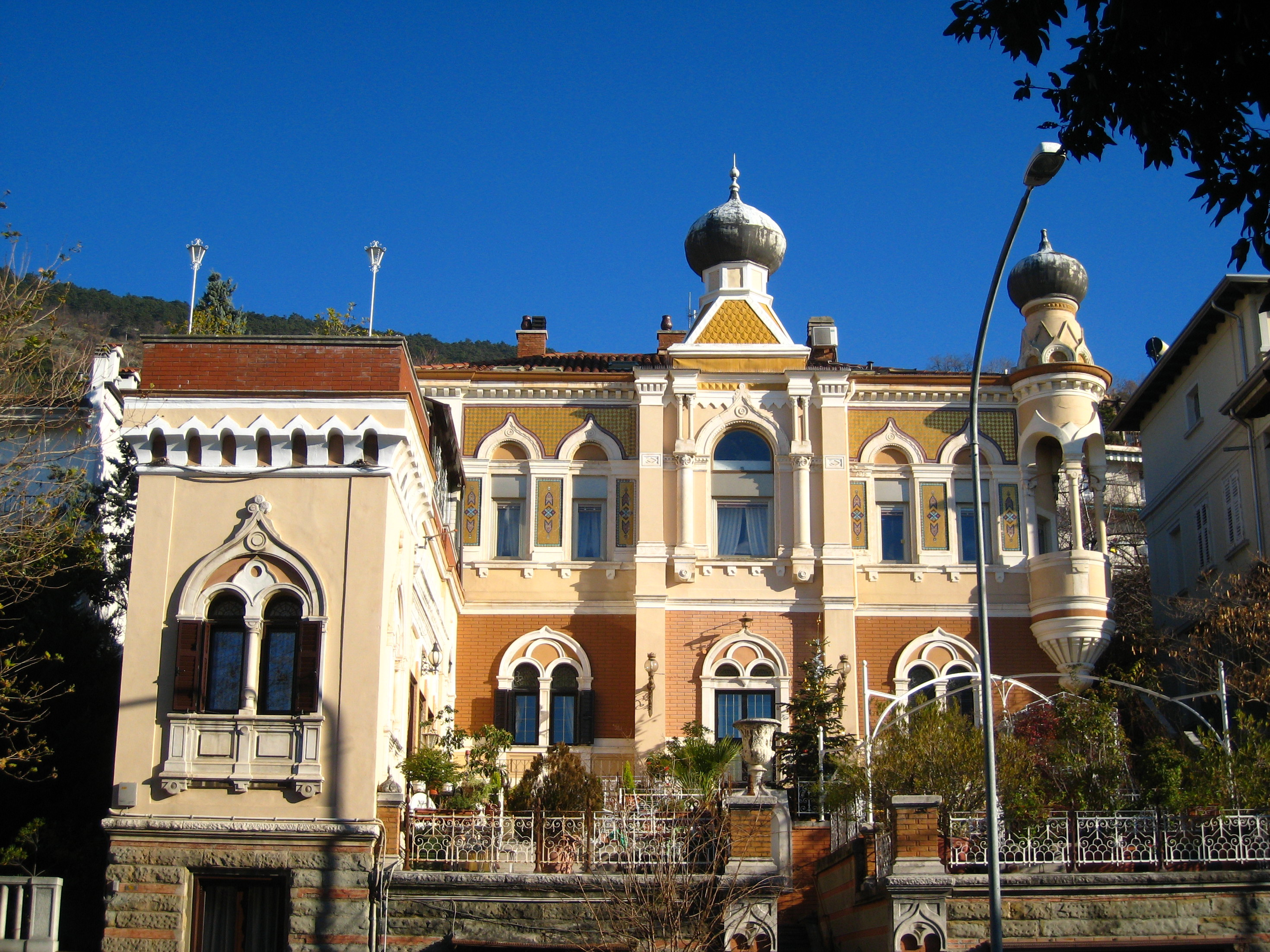
Casa Jakic

In the 1950s, the Pineta area was developed. The "Pineta di Barcola", with its 25,400 square meters of pine forest, today houses numerous bars and sports areas for bathers. In addition to many villas in rich Trieste, the building at Viale Miramare 229 with its distinctive onion turrets is particularly eye-catching. This villa, the Casa Jakic, dates from 1896 and initially belonged to a Russian Orthodox priest who was said to be a tsarist spy and was later used as an arcade and brothel. Until 1969, Barcola was connected to the center by tram line 6. There are always initiatives in Trieste and especially to Barcola to run a tram again.

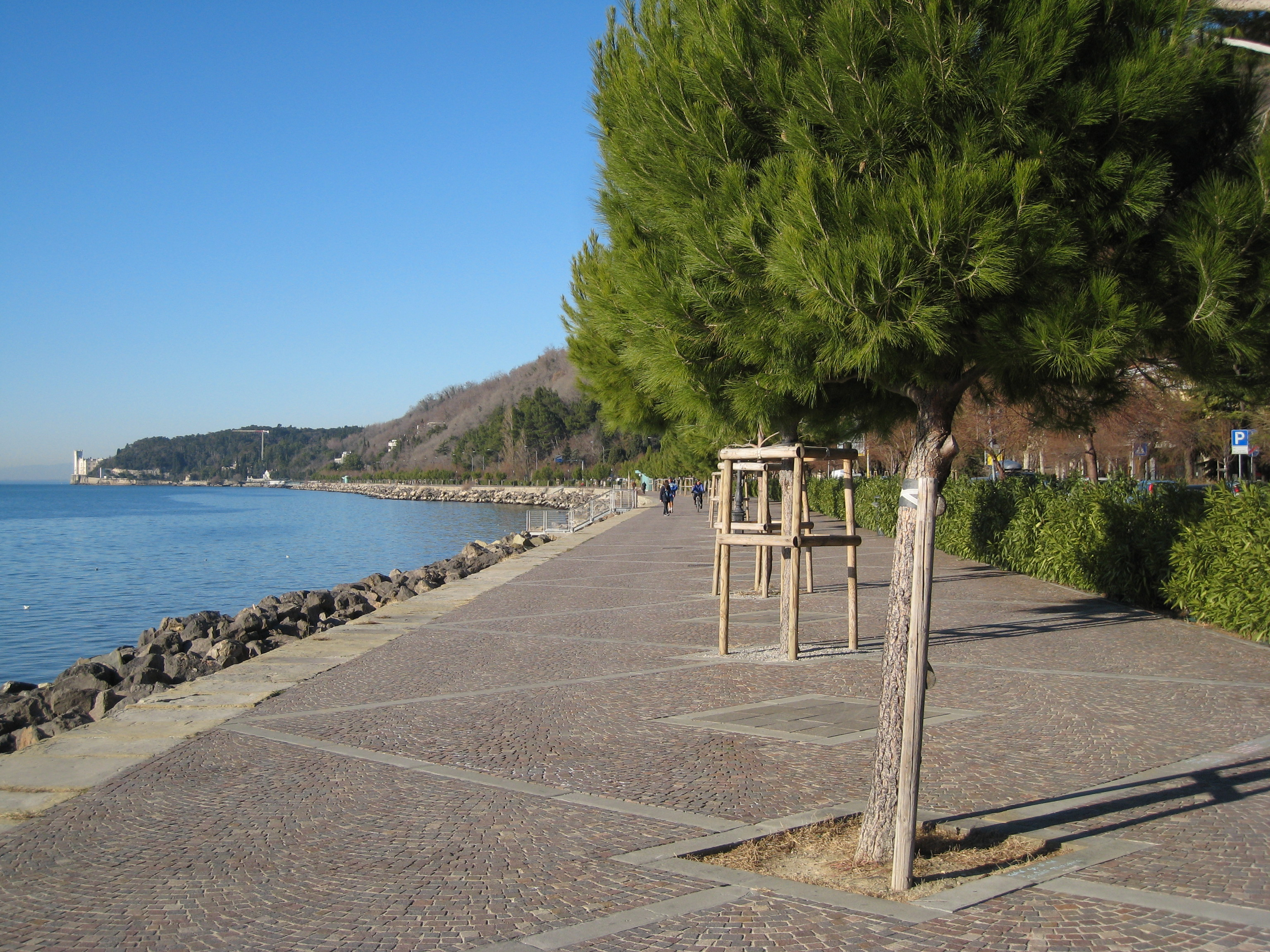
Urban beach for locals in Barcola

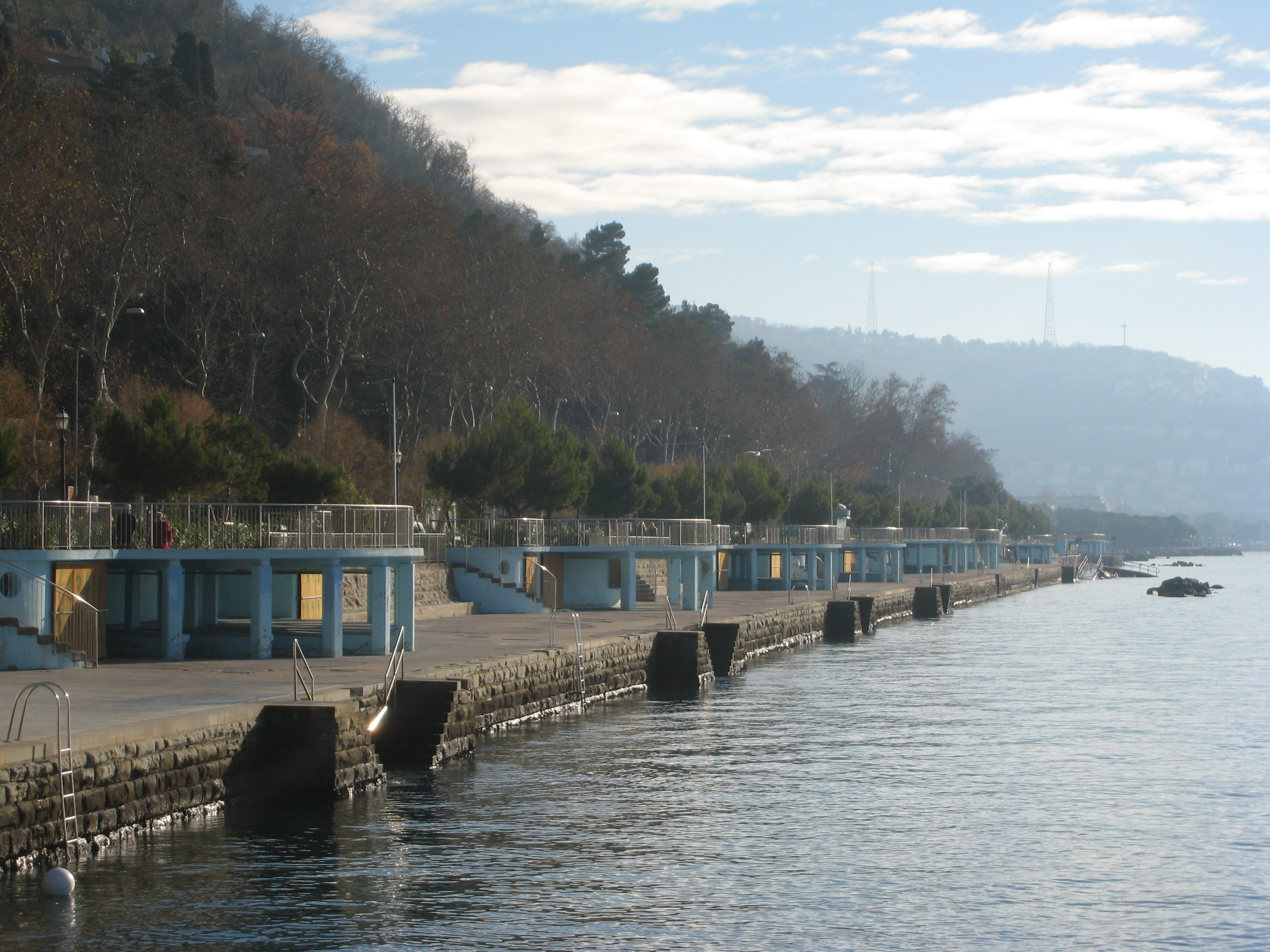
Topolini

The beach, the promenade and the pine forest of Barcola, all classic resorts of Trieste, are particularly busy in summer. The scholar Claudio Magris bathed here as a child with his mother. The extensive redesign of the waterfront with the paving made of porphyry stones and sandstone slabs took place in the years 2000 to 2001. The ten popular semicircular building blocks on the shore, consisting of a viewing platform, sanitary facilities and changing rooms, are popularly known as Topolini (plural of the Walt Disney character "Mickey Mouse"- because of the characteristic shape from above). There is a wide range of restaurants and extensive parking spaces. The bronze sculpture Mula di Trieste ("The Girl from Trieste") by Nino Spagnoli has stood in the small marina of Barcola since 2005 and is supposed to symbolize the Trieste youth, colloquially referred to as mula. In the pine forest of Barcola there is the bronze sculpture la Nuotatrice, especially known as la Sirenetta ("The Little Mermaid") by the sculptor Ugo Cara as an homage to the Trieste swimmers. In 2020 there are plans to solve the traffic and parking problems in the summer through structural measures and the creation of an original beach, corresponding to the time before the road was built in the 19th century.

Barcola is a well-known windsurfing and kite spot because of the offshore bora.

The experiences and stories of the local captains, skippers and fishermen from Trieste and Barcola (with their stories in local bars such as Skipper Point) are recorded by the author Paolo Rumiz in his book Il Ciclope.

Since 2001 there has been a weather station of the Italian Air Force in Barcola.

=== Barcolana regatta ===
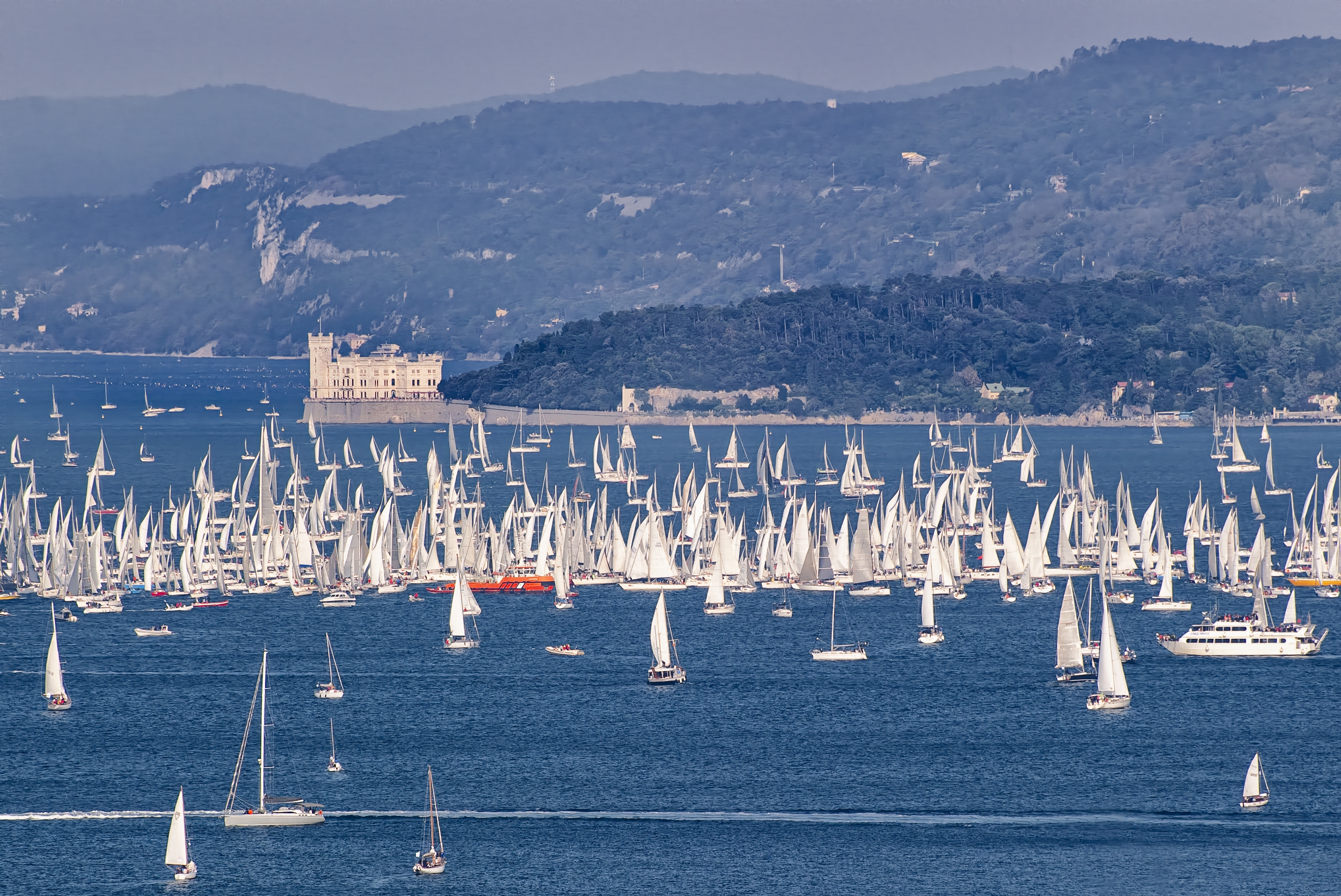
Barcolana regatta is the largest in the world

It is best known for the Barcolana regatta, a European sailing race that happens every year in October. The Barcolana was founded in 1969 thanks to the initiative of the yacht club Società Velica di Barcola e Grignano. It is one of the most crowded regattas in the world. The Barcolana became the Guinness World Record holder in February 2019 when it was named "the greatest sailing race" with its 2,689 boats and over 16,000 sailors on the starting line.

=== Slovenes ===
According to the last Austro-Hungarian census of 1911, more than 73% of the population of the suburb were of Slovene ethnicity. After the annexation to Italy in 1920, the ratio of Slovene speakers fell significantly; however, Barcola is still an important center of the Slovene minority in Italy. Traditionally, the Karst dialect of Slovene has been spoken in Barcola, differently from most other ethnic Slovene villages around Trieste, where the Inner Carniolan dialect is spoken. It is known as 'Barkovlje' in Slovene.
