= Monkey dey work, baboon dey chop =

West African proverb

Monkey dey work, baboon dey chop ("The monkey is working but the baboon is eating") is a proverb in Nigerian pidgin. It is commonly used to describe situations where one performs the labour while another reaps the benefits.

The saying is widely used in Nigeria to criticise exploitation and social inequality. It often appears painted on walls and vehicles, especially in large urban areas. In Lagos, it is frequently seen on danfo trucks, with drivers using it to express frustration at perceived injustices such as extortion by touts and traffic officers, with one driver lamenting: "I chose this slogan because it expresses the anger I feel everyday on the road. I work tirelessly each day like a monkey, while the baboon [referring to the touts and traffic officers] stand somewhere and just chop [eat] from us." In 2011, workers at Nigerdock staged a protest against unfair labour practices and racism of the all-white management, carrying placards with the saying and similar variations like "We work like elephants and eat like ants."

It has also been used to criticise political corruption, as well as colonial and post-colonial exploitation. In 1983, Nigerian author and later Nobel laureate Wole Soyinka released Unlimited Liability Company, a two-sided musical composition, in which he adopted the saying to criticise the political environment under President Shehu Shagari's administration, particularly the perceived hypocrisy and corruption of the ruling circles. Historian and social critic Bala Usman used the saying in his 1979 work For the Liberation of Nigeria to attack global oil companies operating in Nigeria, arguing the industry is set up to priotise their interests, often to the detriment of the country. The saying was popularly used by Fela Kuti in his songs. In his Unnecessary Begging (1976), he delivers a revolutionary message and warns of retribution for injustice:

Nigerian pidgin

Everyday, everyday, I dey hungry
Everyday, everyday, no house to stay
Monkey dey work, baboon dey chop
Baboon dey hold the key of store
Monkey dey cry, baboon dey laugh
The day monkey eye come open now-
Baboon dey vex
Monkey refuse to work
Baboon dey vex and craze
Then he start to beg and beg-
Unnecessary begging, as we dey call am for area...

Translation:
English

Everyday I am hungry
Everyday, I have no place to live
The monkey works, the baboon eats
The baboon holds the key of the store
The monkey cries, the baboon laughs
The day the monkey's eyes open-
The baboon worries
Monkey refuses to work
Baboon worries and becomes agitated
Then he starts to beg and beg-
That is unnecessary begging, as we call it in this area...

During the 2011 Liberian presidential election, incumbent Ellen Johnson Sirleaf played on the saying in her campaign slogan: "ugly baboon wait small, small monkey still working."
