= Simčič =

Simčič is a South Slavic surname. Notable people with the surname include:

- Anna Simcic (born 1971), New Zealand swimmer
- Igor Simčič (born 1954), Slovenian sports businessman
- Vasja Simčič (born 1983), Slovenian footballer
- Zorko Simčič (born 1921), Slovenian poet, writer and publicist

== See also ==
- Vasyl Symchych - Ukrainian transliteration of the surname
