= MSC Group =

Global transport company

- Industry: Transport, logistics, healthcare, shipping, passenger
- Founded: 1970, 55 years ago in Brussels, Belgium
- Founder: Gianluigi Aponte
- Headquarters: Geneva, Switzerland
- Key people: Gianluigi Aponte (Executive Chairman), Diego Aponte (Group President), Alexa Aponte Vago (Group Chief Financial Officer)
- Owner: Diego Aponte, Alexa Aponte Vago
- Number of employees: 200,000+ (2024)
- Website: www.mscgroup.com

MSC Group is a global business focused on cargo transport, logistics, healthcare, shipping, and passenger transport. The company was founded in 1970 by Captain Gianluigi Aponte in Brussels, Belgium, as Mediterranean Shipping Company (MSC). MSC Group was developed as the parent company after the Aponte family began to invest in new business areas. The company's headquarters are located in Geneva, Switzerland. It currently employs over 200,000 employees and operates in 155 countries. MSC Group is the parent company of Mediterranean Shipping Company (MSC) and MSC Cruises, a cruise line for passengers.

== History ==
MSC Group was founded in 1970 in Brussels, Belgium, by Captain Gianluigi Aponte. Aponte began the company with one ship, MV Patricia. Later that same year, the company formed its first business, MSC Mediterranean Shipping Company, and added an additional vessel, Rafaela. Through the use of the two cargo ships, in 1971, MSC began a shipping line operating between the Mediterranean and Somalia.

In 1988, MSC Group launched MEDLOG to manage the land transport of goods. The following year, in 1989, the company acquired the Lauro cruise lines, which were later renamed MSC Cruises in 1995.

MSC Group then launched Explora Journeys, a luxury cruise line, in 2021. The company began with four ships, all of which set sail in 2023. Also in 2021, MSC Group purchased a controlling stake in Log-In, a coasting trade company and integrated logistics operator headquartered in Brazil.

In 2022, Africa Global Logistics (AGL) joined MSC Group as a multimodal logistics operator for port, logistics, sea, and rail in Africa. Later that year, MSC Air Cargo was launched. It was announced in August 2022 that MSC Group would be acquiring Mediclinic Group, an international private hospital group.

In 2024, MSC Group acquired a 50% stake in Italo, the first Italian private operator on the high-speed rail network. That year, Gram Car Carriers (GCC) joined MSC Group as the world's third-largest tonnage provider, with its 19 vessels within the Pure Car Truck Carriers (PCTCs) segment. MSC Group announced in August 2024 that its subsidiary SNAV received a new ferry from Intermarine, an Italian shipbuilding company. Also in 2024, MSC Group completed the acquisition of a 49.9% minority stake in HHLA.

MSC Group integrated its tugboat business with the Boluda Group in February 2025. In March, MSC Group's terminal operator TiL partnered with investment group BlackRock to purchase terminals in Panama from CK Hutchison for $22.8 billion. MSC Group also acquired Wilson Sons in Brazil for $760 million in May 2025.

In November 2025, MSC Group and the MSC Foundation supported the transportation of hurricane relief efforts in Jamaica by delivering essential supplies in coordination with local authorities and partners.

In March 2026, MSC Group signed a 45-year concession agreement with Nigerdock for a new a container terminal at Snake Island Port in Lagos, as part of a planned investment of more than $1 billion in Nigeria's infrastructure and logistics sector. In April 2026, it was announced that the Aponte family had completed a transfer of ownership of the company from founder Gianluigi Aponte to his two children, Diego Aponte and Alexa Aponte Vago. Both heirs, who are Italian nationals residing in Switzerland, hold leadership roles; Diego serves as Group President, and Alexa serves as Group Chief Financial Officer. Gianluigi Aponte will remain as Executive Chairman. Also in April, it was reported that MSC Group's subsidiary, MSC Mediterranean Shipping Company, became the first container shipping line with a fleet of 1,000 vessels. The following month, construction began on the Sparrows Point Container Terminal in Maryland, as a partnership between Terminal Investment Limited (TiL), a subsidiary of MSC Group, and Tradepoint Atlantic. According to CBS News, the168-acre facility is expected to increase the Port of Baltimore's container capacity by 70%, create 8,000 jobs, and generate $1.5 billion for the region.

== Subsidiaries ==
=== Mediterranean Shipping Company (MSC) ===
Mediterranean Shipping Company (MSC) is the world's largest shipping container line with 1000 vessels and operations across 155 countries, as of 2025.

=== MSC Cruises ===
MSC Cruises is the world's largest privately held cruise company, and operates 23 ships across terminals in the United States and Europe.

=== MEDLOG ===
MEDLOG provides inland logistics.

=== Terminal Investment Limited (TiL) ===
TiL secures and manages port terminal access. It has become one of the largest terminal operators in the world.

=== Africa Global Logistics (AGL) ===
AGL expands MSC Group's port and terminal network by providing multimodal transport and infrastructure development.

=== WEC Lines ===
WEC Lines provides shortsea container shipping services throughout Europe and North Africa with a fleet of 14 vessels.

=== Log-In Logística Intermodal ===
Log-In Logística Intermodal trades in Brazil and the Mercosur region through coastal shipping, road transport, and terminal services.

=== Boluda ===
In February 2025, Boluda acquired MedTug, which provides harbor towage services and invests in fleet modernization.

=== MSC Air Cargo ===
MSC Air Cargo runs air freight services that integrate with MSC Group's global shipping network.

=== Gram Car Carriers (GCC) ===
GCC is the world's third-largest provider of PCTC tonnage and has a fleet of seventeen vessels, as of 2025.

=== Messina Line ===
Messina Line provides specialized shipping services throughout the regions of the Mediterranean and Africa.

== The MSC Foundation ==
The MSC Foundation is a private non-profit organization that was founded in 2018. The foundation works towards marine conservation, community support, education, and emergency relief.

In 2016, MSC Group acquired a private island, Ocean Cay, which the foundation restored. In 2020, the foundation partnered with the University of Miami and Nova Southeastern University to develop a program to contribute research to help restore coral reefs worldwide.

In April 2024, it was announced that MSC Group, the foundation, and Mercy Ships would be partnering to build a hospital vessel that would provide free surgery and yearly training to individuals in Africa.

The foundation opened a Marine Conservation Center on Ocean Cay in April 2025.
