= Barcolana =

Italian sailing regatta

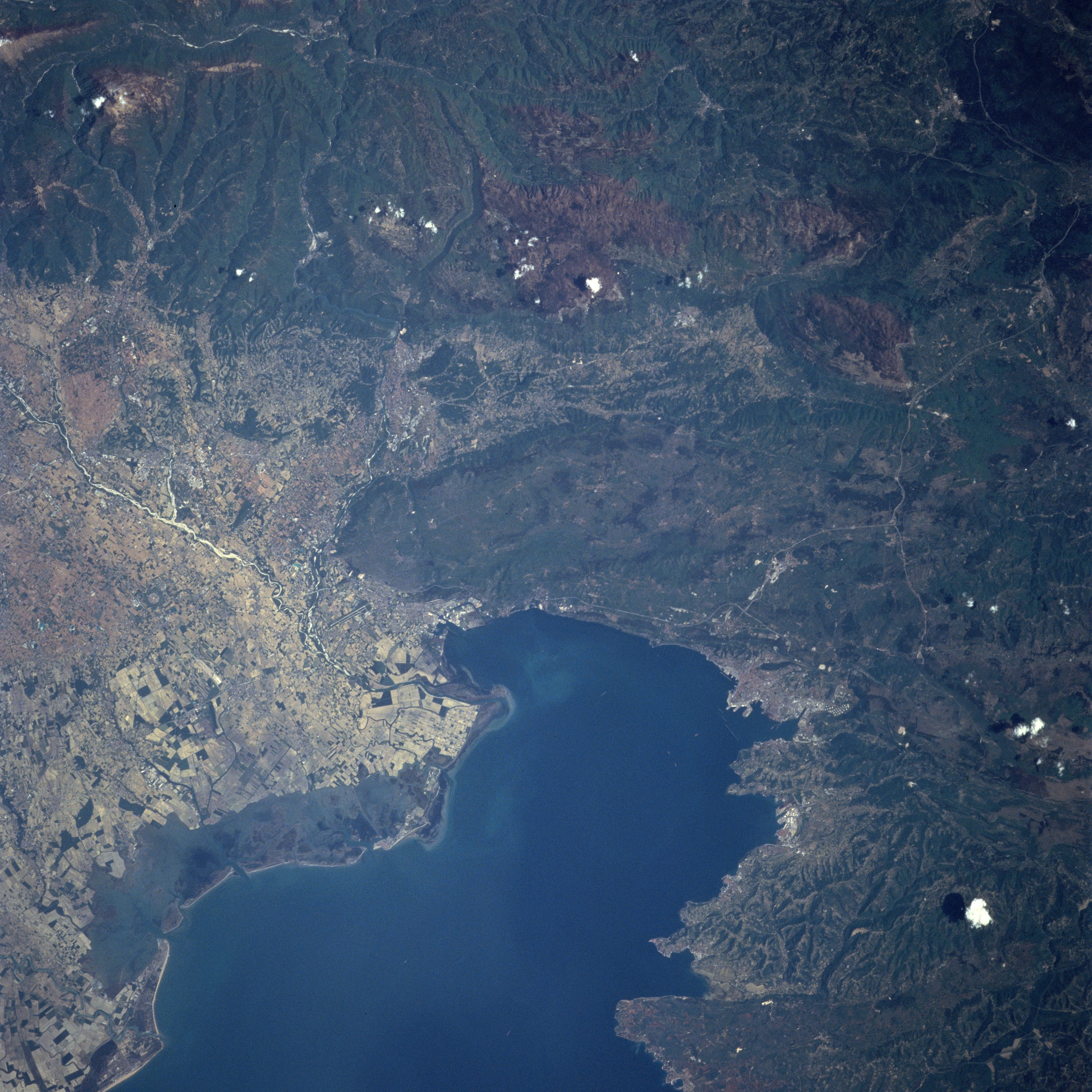
- NASA satellite image of the Gulf of Trieste
- First held: 1969
- Organizer: Società Velica di Barcola Grignano
- Length: 13 nmi (24 km; 15 mi)
- Website: www.barcolana.it

The Barcolana (Slovene: Barkovljanka) is a historic international sailing regatta organized by the Sailing Club of Barcola and Grignano (Società Velica di Barcola e Grignano). It takes place every year in the Gulf of Trieste on the second Sunday of October. The Barcolana is one of the most crowded regattas in the world. The Barcolana became the Guinness World Record holder in February 2019 when it was named "the greatest sailing race" with its 2,689 boats and over 16,000 sailors on the starting line.

The Barcolana is a unique event on the international sailing stage: on the same starting line expert sailors and sailing lovers race, side by side, on boats of different sizes divided into several divisions according to their overall length.

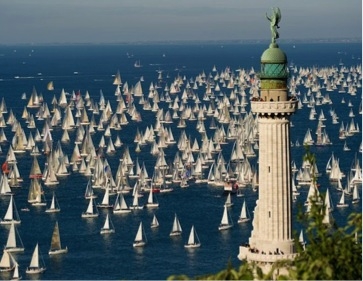
Victory Lighthouse in the foreground above Barcola and the ships of the Barcolana in the background

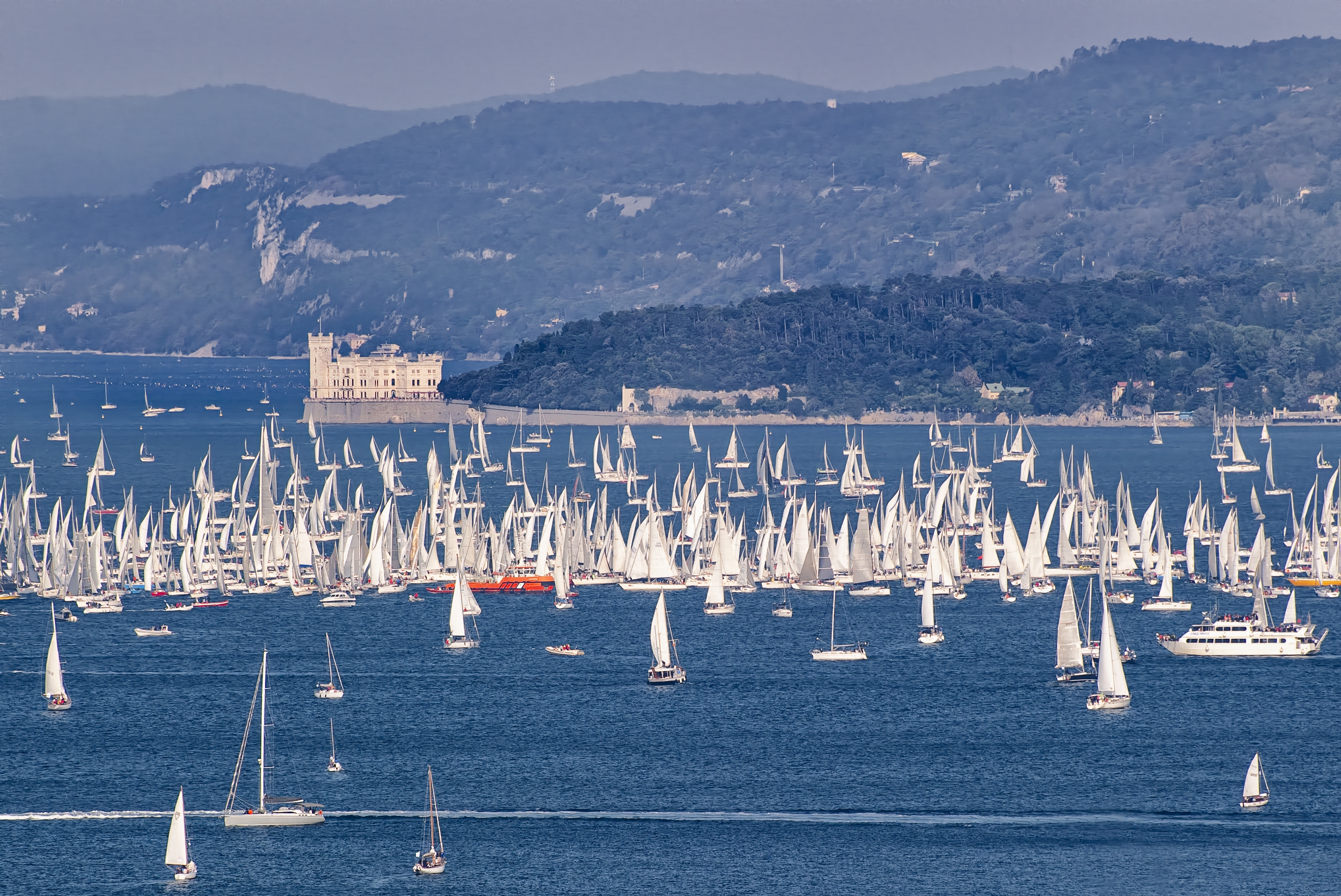
Barcolana 2018

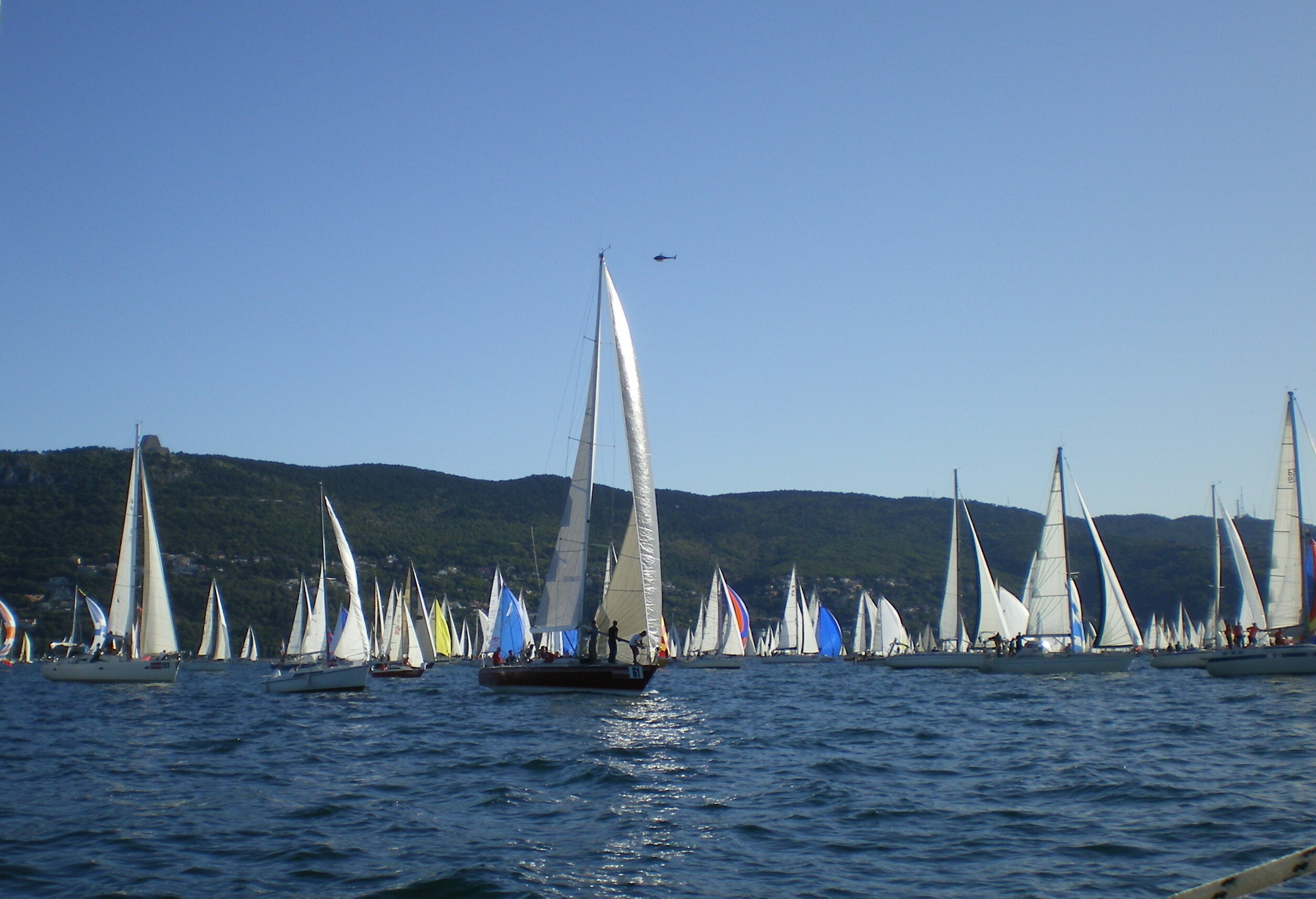
Sailing the first side of the route during the 41st Barcolana

== History ==
The Barcolana was founded in 1969 thanks to the initiative of the yacht club Società Velica di Barcola e Grignano in Trieste. It has always taken place on the second Sunday of October to end the season of the yacht club, and therefore its full name is Barcolana Autumn Cup Regatta. During the first edition of the regatta, only 51 sailing boats from yacht clubs of Trieste took part in the race.

Today, the Barcolana is known for its distinctive format: boats of very different sizes and performance levels share the same starting line and sail the same course, creating a unique spectacle in the Gulf of Trieste. Unlike traditional sailing regattas reserved for professional or highly competitive crews, the event is open to both experienced sailors and amateurs. Over the years, it has also become one of the city's most important annual events, attracting large numbers of participants and visitors.

== The course ==
The race takes place on a 15-mile four-sided, fixed mark course. The starting line is between the Miramare Castle and the seat of the Società Velica di Barcola e Grignano and for the first time in 2014 the finish line will be in the waters just off Piazza Unità d'Italia. Over the years the route has undergone several changes and for many years one buoy has floated in Slovenian waters.

== Participation ==
The Barcolana is not an event for sailors only, but it involves the whole city of Trieste attracting tourists from abroad. Every year about 25,000 sailors take part in the race and more than 250,000 spectators watch the Barcolana from the Trieste seafront, known as the Rive, and from the Karst highland. Thanks to the particular conformation of the territory around the Gulf of Trieste, spectators can enjoy the race from numerous observation points as if sitting in a natural “sailing stadium”.

== Side events ==
The Barcolana is not only the regatta on Sunday morning, but includes several events involving the sea and the city for ten days. In recent years several races and side events have taken place:

- Land Rover Extreme 40: for the first time in 2014, the catamarans Extreme 40 of the Extreme Sailing Series will race for several days in the Gulf of Trieste;
- Barcolana Young: a race on Optimist Class Boats dedicated to athletes aged between 8 and 15;
- Barcolana Classic: a race for vintage and classic boats;
- Barcolana by Night: the Ufo 28 one-design class boats will race by night just off Piazza Unità d'Italia;
- Barcolana FUN: kitesurfers and windsurfers will race in the Bacino San Giusto, just off Piazza Unità d'Italia.

The Barcolana also includes several events on land:

- Barcolanda Village: a village of stands along the Rive of Trieste offering food and wine areas, areas dedicated to the sponsors and exhibitions of technical equipment;
- Barcolana in Music: several night concerts before the Barcolana;
- FuoriRegata: local businesses organize events and activities including tastings, cultural and commercial events.

== Cups and trophies ==
Several prizes are awarded during the prize-giving ceremony which usually takes place at the end of November. The spirit of many prizes goes beyond the mere sporting result and enhances sporting values and the origin of the event.

- Barcolana Trophy (permanent trophy): to the overall winner;
- President of the Republic Trophy: to the overall winner;
- Generali Trophy: to the winner in the Cruiser Class, the trophy is not awarded to race boats but only to “cruisers”;
- Cups: to the first, the second and the third in each category; to the first, the second and the third in each Cruiser Class; to the first monotype boat belonging to a class with over 10 participants;
- Fondazione CRTRIESTE Trophy: to the skipper of the first boat of the Trieste Province;
- Port of Trieste Trophy: to the Italian boat that beats the highest number of boats in its category;
- Italo-Austrian Friendship Trophy: to the first Austrian boat in the overall ranking;
- City of Trieste Trophy: to the sailing club within the zone 13 with the highest number of entrants (excluding SVBG);
- Fulvio Molinari Trophy: to the first boat owner in the overall ranking who participated in at least 20 Barcolana regattas;
- IYFR Trophy (International Yachting Fellowship of Rotarians): to the first boat with a crew consisting of a Rotary member and at least one disabled member of a Paralympic Federation;
- Giovanni Sigovich Trophy: to the first boat of the IX category (up to 6.45 m in length);
- Fair Play Barcolana Trophy: to the boatowner who during the Barcolana distinguished himself/herself for fair play actions which best express the seafaring spirit of the event;
- “Rose in the Wind” Trophy: to the first helmswoman of a boat with a mixed crew;
- Boatowner of the Italian Navy League: to the first boat of the Italian Navy League.

== Walk of Fame ==
Edition	Sailboat	Skipper	Club
1969	Betelgeuse	Napp	Società Triestina della Vela
1970	Marie	Pesle	Yacht Club Adriaco
1971	Carla	Sigovich	Circolo Velico Torri del Benaco
1972	Sandra	Toffaloni	Yacht Club Adriaco
1973	Vento di mare	Rizzi	Società Triestina della Vela
1974	Kaiten	Zalukar	Società Velica di Barcola e Grignano
1975	El Raguseo	Colonna	Società Triestina della Vela
1976	El Raguseo	Colonna	Società Triestina della Vela
1977	Papillon	Drioli	Yacht Club Adriaco
1978	El Cid	Bartoli-Zago	Società Triestina della Vela
1979	El Cid	Bartoli-Zago	Società Triestina della Vela
1980	Rupe	Hoffmeister-Stadler	Yacht Club de Monaco
1981	White Shadow	Drioli	Società Velica di Barcola e Grignano
1982	Condor	Battiston	Yacht Club Lignano
1983	White Shadow	Drioli	Società Velica di Barcola e Grignano
1984	Condornonsisamai	Becchetti	Yacht Club Lignano
1985	Blue Eyed Princess	Bardelli	Società Velica di Barcola e Grignano
1986	La Fenice di Venezia	Venerucci	Circolo Nautico Chioggia
1987	Il Moro di Venezia	Ferruzzi-Nava	Circolo Velico Ravennate
1988	Uragan	Battiston	Yacht Club Lignano
1989	Il Moro di Venezia 2	Ferruzzi-Nava	Circolo Velico Ravennate
1990	Fanatic	Zizala-Battiston	Yacht Club Lignano
1991	Satanasso Calbre	Gaburri-Poli	Associazione Nautica Sebina
1992	Il Moro di Venezia	Ferruzzi-Chieffi	Yacht Club Italiano
1993	Fanatic	Zizala-Battiston	Yacht Club Lignano
1994	Fanatic	Zizala-Puh	Yacht Club Lignano
1995	Gaia Legend	Kosmina	Jadralni Klub Jadro
1996	Gaia Legend	Kosmina	Jadralni Klub Jadro
1997	Gaia Legend	Kosmina	Jadralni Klub Jadro
1998	Riviera di Rimini	Benvenuti-Cian	CV Rimini
1999	@DRIACOM	Cilenti	CDV Pd
2000	@DRIACOM	Cilenti	CDV Pd
2001	Cometa	Pfizer-Favini	CVMM
2002	Uniflair	Cilenti-Bressani	CVV
2003	Alfa Romeo I	Neville Crichton	Cruising Yacht Club of Australia
2004	Alfa Romeo I	Neville Crichton	Cruising Yacht Club of Australia
2005	Provincia di Trieste	Lorenzo Bressani	
2006	Alfa Romeo II	Neville Crichton	Cruising Yacht Club of Australia
2007	Alfa Romeo II	Neville Crichton	Cruising Yacht Club of Australia
2008	Alfa Romeo II	Neville Crichton	Cruising Yacht Club of Australia
2009	Maxi Jena	Mitja Kosmina	Jahtni Klub
2010	Esimit Europa 2	Igor Simčič	Yacht Club de Monaco
2011	Esimit Europa 2	Igor Simčič	Yacht Club de Monaco
2012	Esimit Europa 2	Jochen Schümann	Yacht Club de Monaco
2013	Esimit Europa 2	Jochen Schümann	Yacht Club de Monaco
2014	Esimit Europa 2	Igor Simčič	Yacht Club de Monaco
2015	Robertissima III	Vasco Vascotto	Yacht Club Costa Smeralda
2016	Alfa Romeo	Furio Benussi	Yacht Club Adriaco
2017	Spirit of Portopiccolo	Furio Benussi	Yacht Club Portopiccolo
2018	Spirit of Portopiccolo	Furio Benussi	Yacht Club Portopiccolo
2019	Way of Life	Gašper Vinčec	Sailing Planet
2020			
2021	Arca SGR	Furio Benussi	Yacht Club Adriaco
2022	Deep Blue	Wendy Schmidt	New York Yacht Club
2023	Arca SGR	Furio Benussi	Yacht Club Adriaco
2024	Arca SGR	Furio Benussi	Yacht Club Adriaco
2025	Arca SGR	Furio Benussi	Yacht Club Adriaco
2026	Arca SGR	Furio Benussi	Yacht Club Adriaco

== See also ==
- Miramare Biosphere Reserve and Marine Reserve
