= SLAM (clothing) =

Italian sportswear company

SLAM S.p.A.
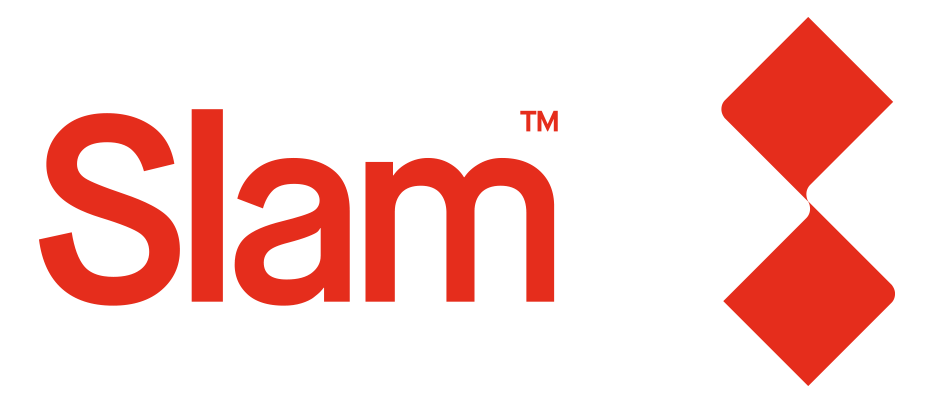
- The SLAM logo, featuring a stylized greyhound (levriero).
- Company type: Società per azioni (S.p.A.)
- Industry: Apparel, Sportswear
- Genre: Technical sailing gear, Lifestyle fashion
- Founded: 1979; 47 years ago
- Founders: Pietro Passaleva, Franco Degan, et al.
- Headquarters: Genoa, Italy
- Key people: Federico De Brabant (CEO)
- Products: Sailing apparel, footwear, accessories
- Owner: MSC Cruises
- Parent: MSC Group
- Website: www.slam.com

SLAM S.p.A. is an Italian sportswear company specializing in technical sailing apparel and nautical-inspired lifestyle clothing. Founded in 1979 in Genoa, the company is recognized for its high-performance gear designed for professional sailors and recreational boaters.

Over its history, SLAM has been involved in numerous high-profile sailing events, including the America's Cup and the Barcolana regatta, providing technical kits to various professional teams. As of October 2025, the company is owned by MSC Cruises.

== History ==
=== Foundation ===
SLAM was founded in 1979 in Genoa by a group of sailing enthusiasts, including Pietro Passaleva and Franco Degan. Their objective was to create functional, durable, and comfortable sailing apparel by testing new materials and technologies directly on the water. The company's name is not an acronym but was chosen for its impactful sound, similar to a slamming sail.

The brand's logo, a stylized greyhound (levriero in Italian), was chosen to represent speed and elegance.

=== Growth and Challenges ===
During the 1980s and 1990s, SLAM grew significantly, becoming a well-known brand within the international sailing community. It established itself by sponsoring world-renowned sailors and major sailing syndicates. The company developed several proprietary fabric technologies for its waterproof and breathable jackets, trousers, and mid-layers.

Despite its strong brand recognition in the sailing niche, the company faced significant financial difficulties in the 2010s. By 2017, SLAM filed for concordato preventivo, an Italian form of bankruptcy protection or composition with creditors, leading to a period of uncertainty for the brand.

=== Relaunch and New Ownership ===
In 2021, SLAM was acquired by VAM Investments, a private equity firm, in partnership with the company's new management, including CEO Federico De Brabant. The acquisition aimed to relaunch the historic brand by preserving its technical sailing heritage while also expanding its "lifestyle" and urban wear collections.

The new strategy included a focus on sustainability in materials and production, as well as strengthening its international distribution and e-commerce presence.

=== Acquisition by MSC ===
In October 2025, it was announced that MSC Cruises, a division of the MSC Group, had acquired SLAM from Vam Investments. According to the announcement, the acquisition is intended to support SLAM's international expansion and visibility.

As part of the new ownership, SLAM is expected to continue its core sportswear business while also developing a new professional division focused on the business-to-business (B2B) sector. This new division will include the design and production of uniforms and apparel for other MSC Group companies.

== Products ==
SLAM's product line is divided into two main categories:

- Technical Sailing Gear: This includes high-performance foul-weather gear (jackets and trousers), drysuits, mid-layers, base layers, and footwear designed for professional racing and offshore sailing. These items often feature multi-layer waterproof, breathable membranes and technical details like watertight cuffs and high-visibility hoods.
- Lifestyle and Sportswear: A broader collection of casual wear inspired by the brand's nautical origins. This line includes polo shirts, t-shirts, knitwear, shorts, and casual jackets, often featuring the brand's greyhound logo.

== Sponsorships and Partnerships ==
SLAM has a long history of involvement in professional sailing. It has served as the official technical supplier for numerous sailing teams and events.

Notable sponsorships have included:

- America's Cup: The company has supplied gear to various syndicates over the years, including the Swiss team Alinghi and the Italian Luna Rossa Challenge in some of its past campaigns.
- Barcolana: SLAM has been a long-time sponsor and official supplier for the Barcolana regatta in Trieste, one of the largest sailing races in the world.
- Individual Sailors: The brand has sponsored prominent solo sailors, such as Giovanni Soldini.
- Regattas: SLAM is often a technical partner for other major Mediterranean regattas, such as the Maxi Yacht Rolex Cup.
