= Alfa Romeo II =

Maxi yacht

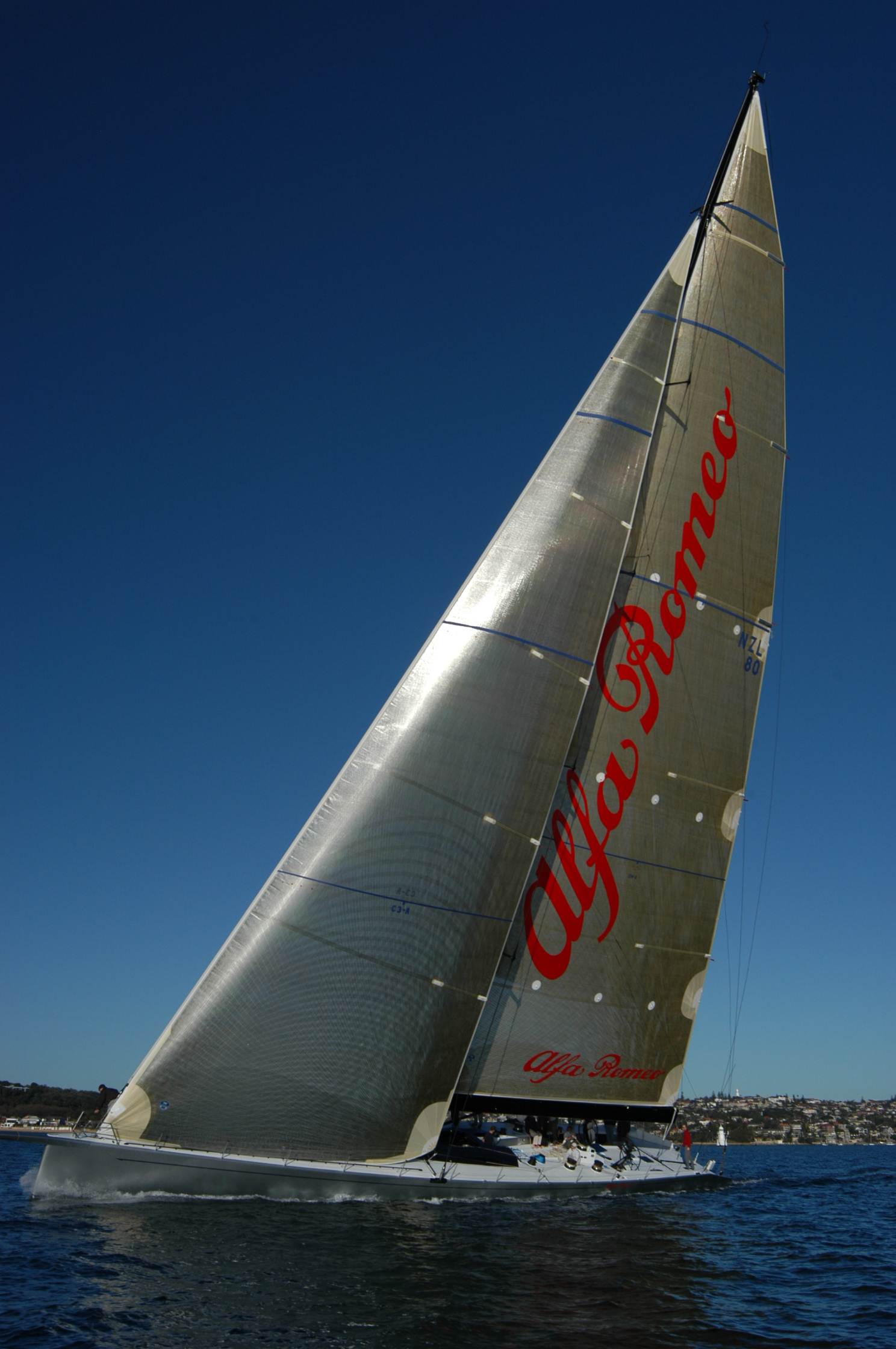
- Alfa Romeo II on her first sail.
- Other names: Black Jack IV
- Designer(s): Reichel/Pugh
- Builder: McConaghy; Sydney, Australia
- Launched: 2005
- Owner(s): Neville Crichton; Igor Simčič

Racing career
- Notable victories: 2009 Transpac; 2009 Sydney–Hobart (l.h.)

Specifications
- Type: maxi yacht
- Length: 30.48 m (100.0 ft) (LOA)
- Beam: 5.19 m (17.0 ft)
- Draft: 5.08 m (16.7 ft)
- Sail area: mainsail 314 m^{2} (3,380 sq ft) genoa 208 m^{2} (2,240 sq ft) asymmetrical spinnaker 805 m^{2} (8,660 sq ft)

Alfa Romeo II (rechristened Black Jack IV) is a maxi yacht designed in 2005 by Reichel/Pugh for yachtsman Neville Crichton. First-to-finish in the 2009 Transpacific Yacht Race ("the Transpac"), she also set a new elapsed-time Transpac race record for monohulls.

Alfa Romeo II is a "Reichel/Pugh 100" design measuring 30.48 m (100.0 ft) overall. She features a 44 m (144 ft) carbon fibre mast built by Southern Spars, water ballast, and a canting keel. She is thought to be capable of 35 knots (40 mph; 60 km/h) downwind in a fresh breeze. Some of the boat's systems are operated via PLCs, automatically stepping up engine speed as power is required to operate the hydraulic ram actuating the canting keel, or disengaging the propeller when it is retracted into the hull to reduce drag.

== History ==
=== 2009 Transpac Race ===
Total crew of about seventeen sailors included Stanley Honey, navigator; Olympian Ben Ainslie, English Gold Medalist Finn sailor of the 2008 Summer Olympics; and members of the Ericcson 4 crew, recently victorious in the Volvo Ocean Race. According to the 7 July 2009 morning report, Alfa Romeo II broke the Transpac race record for most miles covered in one day, set in the 2005 race by Morning Glory, by sailing 399 nautical miles (459 mi; 739 km) in 24 hours. She improved that on both following days; on 8 July 2009, Alfa Romeo II reported 420 nautical miles (480 mi; 780 km); on 9 July 2009, she reported 431 nautical miles (496 mi; 798 km). She was first to finish the 2009 Transpac race, in which she set a new elapsed-time record of 5 days, 14 hours, 36 minutes, 20 seconds. She has been first to finish in at least 140 races.

=== 2009 Sydney to Hobart Yacht Race ===
In 2009, she was the first to finish the Sydney to Hobart Yacht Race.

== Sponsorship ==
The Alfa Romeo yachts owned by Neville Crichton are sponsored by Alfa Romeo Automobiles S.p.A. of Turin, Italy. They own the Alfa Romeo name and other intellectual properties such as logos, emblems (used on Alfa Romeo III), and manner of depicting the name as shown on the mainsail of Alfa Romeo II in the infobox.

In 2006 the team is also sponsored by SLAM, an Italian company producer of technical sailing sportswear, that provides the team of technical clothing.

== See also ==
- Alfa Romeo I
- Alfa Romeo III
- Wild Oats XI
