= Snake Island Port =

Port facility in Lagos, Nigeria

Coordinates: 6.425°N 3.340°E

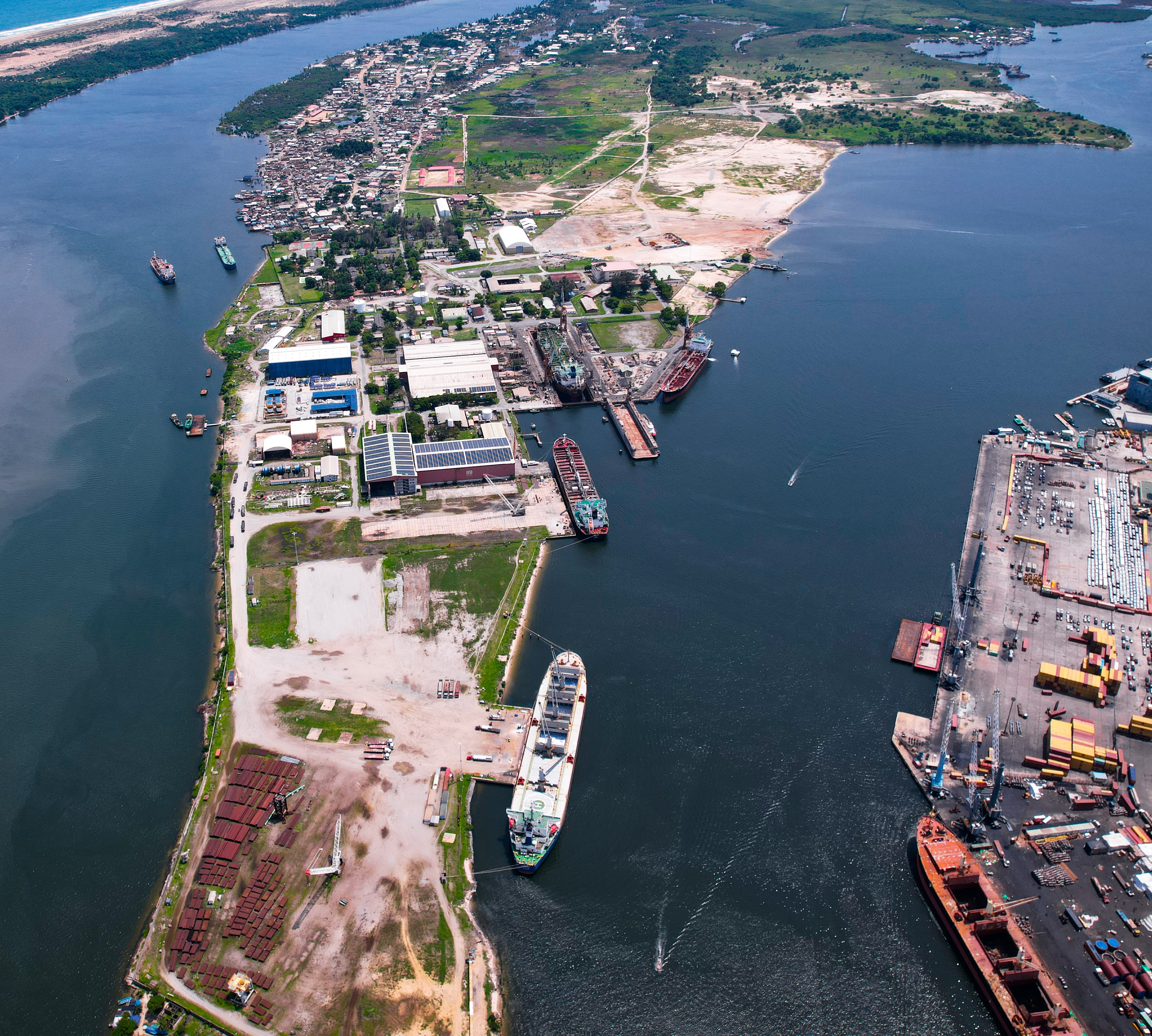
Aerial view of Snake Island Port

Snake Island Port is a multipurpose port facility located within Snake Island Integrated Free Zone in Lagos, Nigeria.

The port covers an area of 85 hectares and includes three terminals with a total quay length of 2.5 kilometres.

== Government approval and development ==
The development of Snake Island Port was approved by the Federal Executive Council of Nigeria on 26 May 2023.

Snake Island Port entered into a 45-year concession agreement with the Nigerian Ports Authority on 27 November 2024.

Nigerdock, in collaboration with the Snake Island Integrated Free Zone, is responsible for managing the port's construction and operations.

== Economic impact ==
The port is projected to attract approximately $1 billion in foreign direct investment (FDI).

== History ==
In 2005, Nigerdock, a Nigerian maritime and logistics company, was granted Free Zone and Port Status by the Presidency, leading to the establishment of the Snake Island Integrated Free Zone (SIIFZ). The company had previously been privatised in 2001 and acquired by the Jagal Group in 2003.

Subsequent developments included approvals from the Nigerian Ports Authority (NPA) and the Nigeria Customs Service in 2017 for direct shipping operations, with the NPA authorising cargo handling activities in 2021.

== Recent news ==
In May 2023, Nigerdock secured approval for the commencement and development of Snake Island Port from the Federal Executive Council of Nigeria. This was followed by a 45-year concession agreement with the Nigerian Ports Authority (NPA) in November 2024 to oversee the port's development and operations.

In March 2026, Mediterranean Shipping Company (MSC) signed a 45-year sub-concession agreement with Nigerdock to develop and operate an exclusive container terminal spanning 30 hectares within Snake Island Port.
