= Paolo Rumiz =

Italian journalist and writer

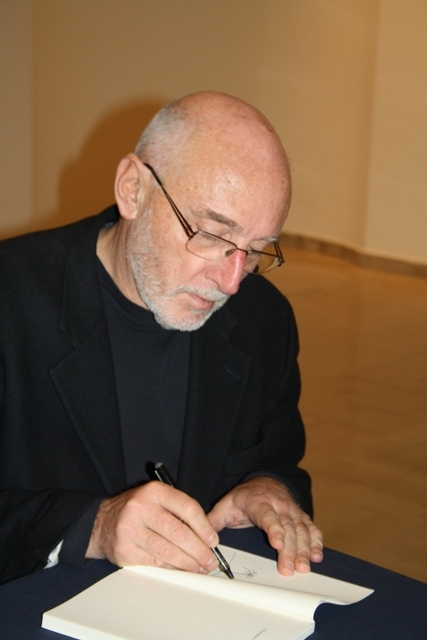
Paolo Rumiz.

Paolo Rumiz (born 20 December 1947) is an Italian journalist and writer.

He was born in Trieste and worked a journalist for the local Il Piccolo newspaper. Later he was editorialist for La Repubblica national newspaper.He wrote reports on the political dissolution of Yugoslavia, the fall of communism in Eastern Europe, and the rise of populism in these areas. Since November 2001, he has been a correspondent in Islamabad and Kabul, witnessing the war in Afghanistan.

Starting from 1986, he mostly dealt with the situation in the Balkan area and wrote several articles on the War in Yugoslavia, and won the Hemingway Prize for his works on Bosnia. He also worked from Kabul after it was invaded by US troops. His reportages on the Yugoslavian area include Maschere per un massacro (1996) and La linea dei mirtilli (1997).

He is the author of several travelling reportages on the Adriatic Coast, the former territories of the Republic of Venice, Jerusalem, places of the Italian Wars of Independence, the Po River, the Italian front of World War I and others.

His works include Storie di una nuova Europa (1990), La leggenda dei monti naviganti (2007), Tre uomini in bicicletta (with Altan, 2008), L'Italia in seconda classe (2009), Trans Europa Express (2012), Morimondo (2013), Come cavalli che dormono in piedi (2014), La cotogna di Istanbul (2015), Il Ciclope (2015), Appia (2016), La regina del silenzio (2017), Il filo infinito (2019), Il veliero sul tetto. Appunti per una clausura (2020), Canto per Europa (2021).

In 1998, he received the prize "Archivio Disarmo - Golden Doves for Peace" from IRIAD.
