= Igor Simčič =

Slovenian sports businessman (born 1954)

Igor Simčič is a Slovenian sports businessman, winemaker, and owner of the yacht Esimit Europa 2 (formerly Alfa Romeo 2), which in 2010 won all attended regattas, including the 42nd Barcolana regatta sailing race.

Simčič is, representing his work as aimed towards promotion of the United Europe, supported by the Slovenian Ministry of Foreign Affairs and the President of the Italian region Friuli-Venezia Giulia, and by the Russian energy company Gazprom. The aim is to deepen relations between the nations of Europe as well as between Europe and Russia.
