= Yacht Club de Monaco =

Monegasque sailing club

- Burgee of the Yacht Club de Monaco
- Full name: Yacht Club de Monaco
- Short name: YCM
- Founded: 1953
- Location: Monaco
- Commodore: Albert II, Prince of Monaco (president)
- Focus: Yachting and sailing
- Website: Official website

The Yacht Club de Monaco (YCM) is a yacht club in Monaco. Founded in 1953 by Rainier III, Prince of Monaco, it is closely associated with the Fédération Monégasque de Voile, the national governing body for sailing in Monaco, recognised by the International Sailing Federation. The club's current clubhouse, designed by Norman Foster of Foster + Partners, opened in 2014.

New building of the club

== History ==
The club was founded in 1953 by Prince Rainier III. Before acquiring permanent premises, it was housed by the Société des Bains de Mer in a former pottery workshop, while its trophies were displayed at the Hôtel de Paris.

In 1966, the club moved to Quai Antoine Ier. Its premises were renovated in 1987 and later extended as the club's activities expanded. In April 1984, Prince Albert became president of the club. Under his presidency, the YCM expanded its sporting programme, including the regatta that became the Primo Cup, and promoted classic yachting through the launch of Monaco Classic Week in 1994 and the acquisition of Tuiga in 1995, which became the club's flagship.

In 2005, the club launched the La Belle Classe label. In 2014, it opened a new clubhouse on Quai Louis II, designed by Norman Foster.

In 2024 and 2025, the Yacht Club de Monaco and its La Belle Classe Academy obtained accreditation as a Royal Yachting Association (RYA) training centre, enabling the delivery of RYA-certified training programmes including powerboat, dinghy sailing and personal watercraft courses.

== Famous sailors ==
See Category:Monegasque sailors

=== Olympic sailing ===
See Category:Olympic sailors for Monaco

=== Offshore sailing ===
See Category:Monegasque yacht racers
