= Vittoria Light =

Vittoria
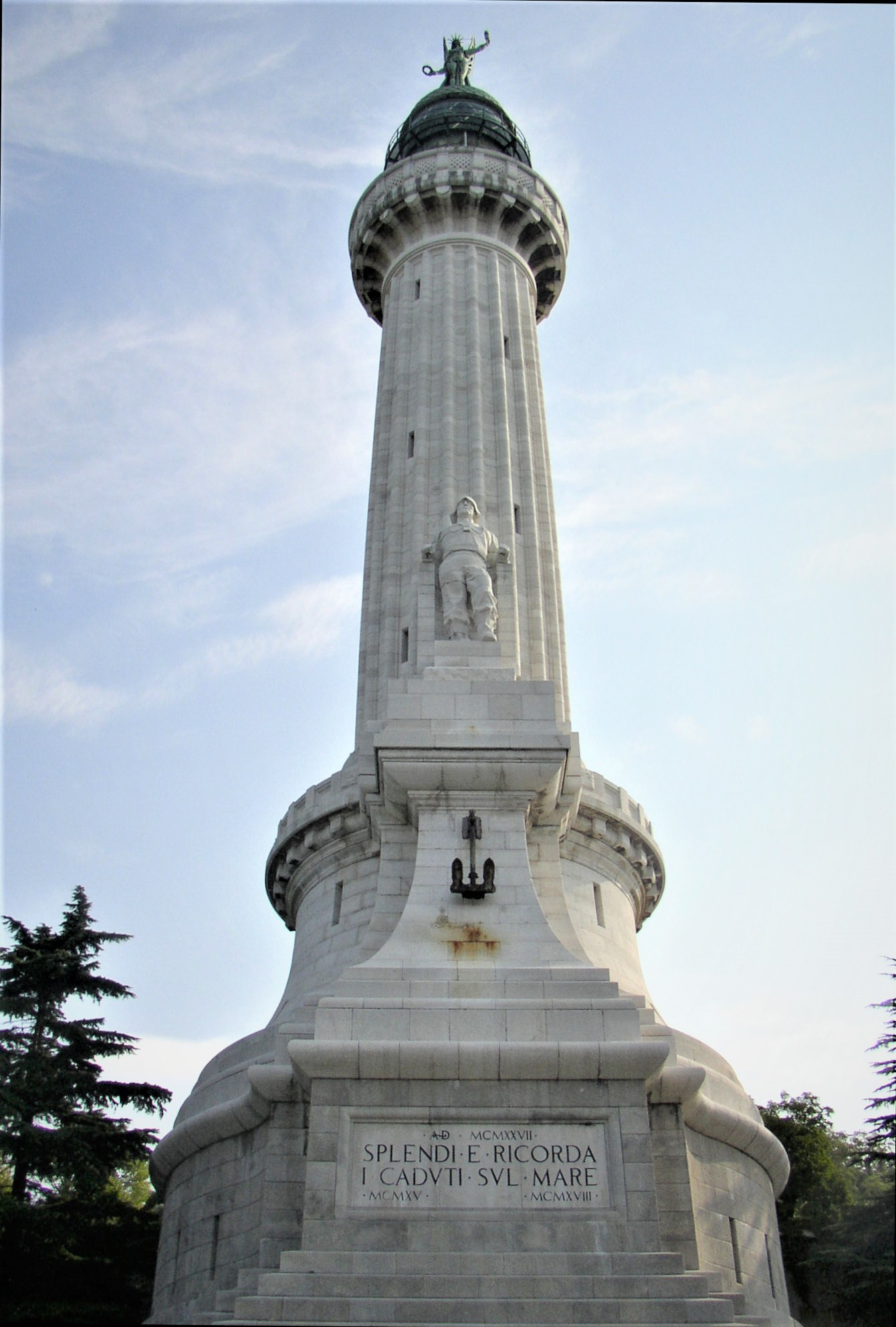
- Vittoria Light in 2005.
- Location: Trieste, Friuli-Venezia Giulia, Italy
- Coordinates: 45°40′32″N 13°45′25″E

Tower
- Constructed: 1927
- Foundation: earthwork
- Construction: stone tower
- Height: 67.85 metres (222.6 ft) (Note: According to "Provincia di Trieste". "Victory lighthouse - Trieste" and "Spifferi di Trieste" give a height of 68.85 metres (225.9 ft). List of Lights gives a height of 223 feet (68 m).)
- Shape: tapered cylindrical tower, crowned by a bronze statue
- Markings: white tower, bronze figure
- Power source: mains electricity
- Operator: Marina Militare

Light
- Focal height: 115 metres (377 ft) (Note: According to "Provincia di Trieste". "Victory lighthouse - Trieste" gives a focal height of 116 metres (381 ft). List of Lights gives a focal height of 378 feet (115 m).)
- Lens: Fresnel lens (original), Type OR 500 (current)
- Intensity: 1,250,000 cd
- Range: main: 22 nautical miles (41 km; 25 mi) reserve: 18 nautical miles (33 km; 21 mi)
- Characteristic: Fl 8"9 W 10s.
- Italy no.: 4376 E.F.

Vittoria Light (Italian: Faro della Vittoria, Slovene: Svetilnik zmage) also known as the Victory Lighthouse, is an active lighthouse in Trieste, Italy, serving the Gulf of Trieste. It is located on the Hill of Gretta (Poggio di Gretta), off the Strada del Friuli. At a height of 223 feet (68 m) it is one of the tallest lighthouses in the world.

== History ==
The idea to raise a monument in the vicinity arose during World War I, following the Italian capture from Austria-Hungary of Kobarid in the Battles of the Isonzo and following the Battle of the Piave River. Originally the lighthouse was to rise on the coast of Istria near Pula. However, the location eventually chosen was the Hill of Gretta, due to its ideal height — 60 metres (197 ft) above sea level — and the solid foundations of the former Austro-Hungarian fort Kressich, built there by the Austrian Empire between 1854 and 1857. One of the reasons for building such a high monument was the Italian desire to build a victory monument higher than the Berlin Victory Column, which was 62.3 metres (204 ft) high.

Plans for the lighthouse took shape in December 1918, following the end of World War I. It was designed by Triestine architect Arduino Berlam, whose design was modified, after a heated debate, by the architect Guido Cirilli, who directed the construction. Eng. Beniamino Battigelli designed the reinforced concrete works and the entire load-bearing structure of the lighthouse; all the technical projects bear his signature and he was always present on the site to supervise the construction. Work started in 1923 and was completed on May 24, 1927, with the dedication of the lighthouse in the presence of the King of Italy, Vittorio Emanuele III.

The structure celebrates the Italian victory in World War I and commemorates those killed at sea during that war, as testified by the inscription "SPLENDI E RICORDA I CADUTI SUL MARE MCMXV–MCMXVIII" ("Shine and Remind of the Fallen at Sea 1915–1918").

In 1979 the lighthouse closed for restoration, which took seven years. It reopened to the public on May 18, 1986.

== Structure ==
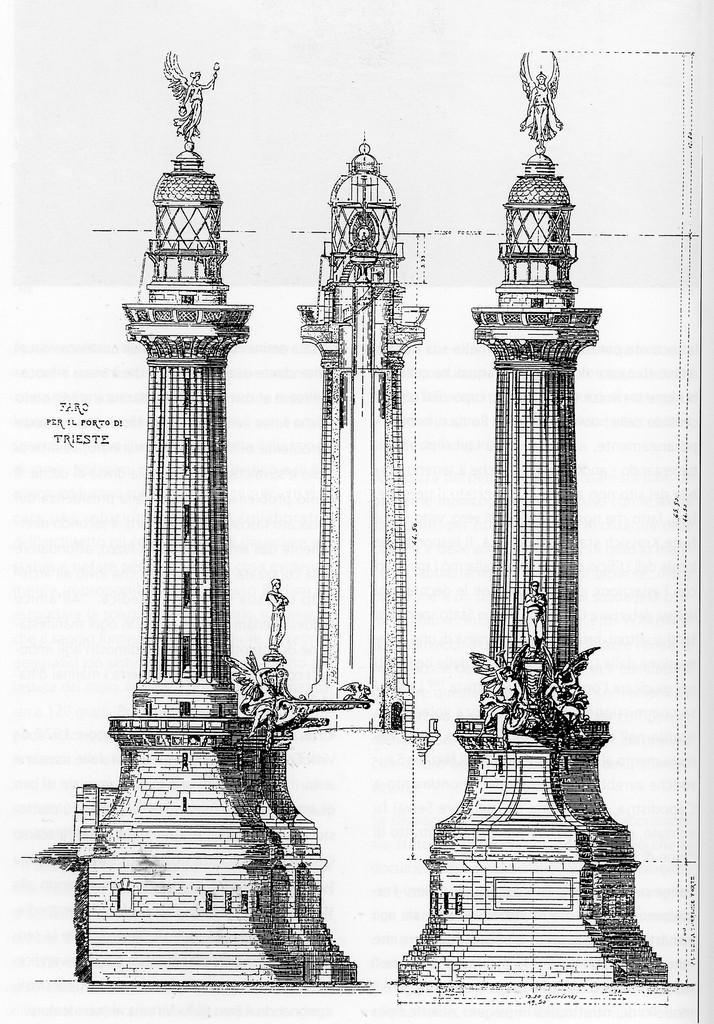
Sketch of Vittoria Light.

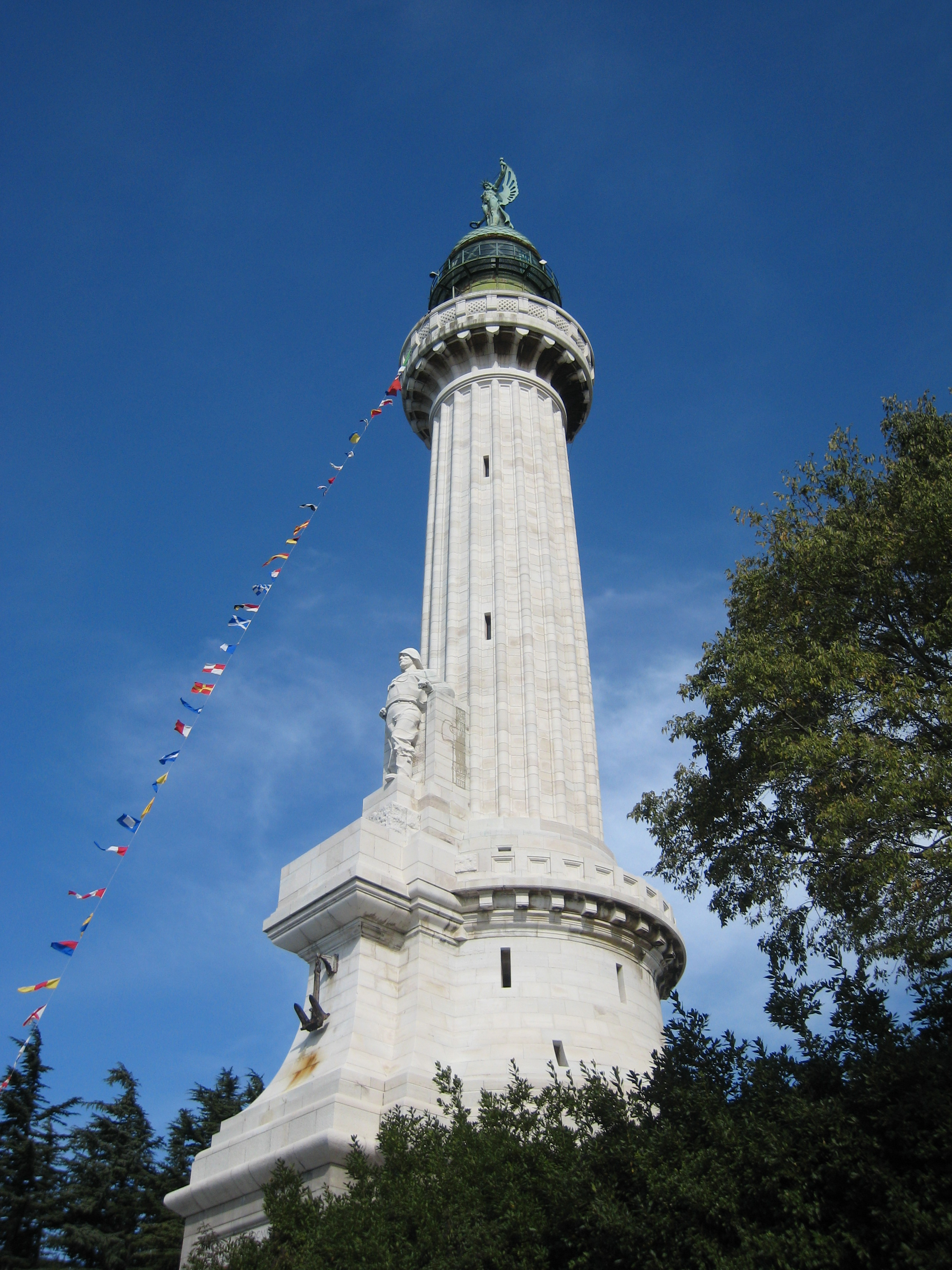
Vittoria Light on 13 October 2008, displaying flags for the 40th Barcolana.

The large base of the lighthouse includes the earthwork of the Austro-Hungarian fort. The bottom of the structure is covered by stone from Gabrie in Carso and the top is covered by stone from Vrsar on Istria. It weighs about 8,000 tonnes (7,900 long tons; 8,800 short tons), and construction involved the use of either 1,300 or 1,500 cubic metres (46,000 or 53,000 cu ft) of stone), 2,000 cubic metres (71,000 cu ft) of concrete, and 100 tonnes (98 long tons; 110 short tons) of iron.

Above the column is a capital and a crow's nest, in which the bronze crystal cage of the lantern is inserted. The cage is topped by a copper dome with a scale-like motif, on top of which is the 7.2-metre-tall (24 ft) statue of a winged Victory by sculptor Giovanni Mayer made of embossed copper and weighing about 7 tonnes (6.9 long tons; 7.7 short tons). The lighthouse was constructed during the period of Fascist rule in the Kingdom of Italy, and it was designed so that its overall shape resembles that of an upside-down fasces, the symbol of Italian fascism.

A 8.6-metre-tall (28 ft) statue of a seaman, also by sculptor Giovanni Mayer, adorns the front of the lighthouse, made from 100 tonnes (98 long tons; 110 short tons) of stone from Vrsar, under which is attached the anchor of the destroyer Audace, which on November 3, 1918, became the first Italian ship to enter the port of Trieste. Two shells from the Austro-Hungarian Navy battleship Viribus Unitis are placed on both sides of the lighthouse entry.

The light itself has been an electrical light since it was first lit. The current light is a 1,000-watt halogen bulb.

== Administration ==
Like all other Italian lighthouses on the Adriatic Sea, Vittoria Light is controlled and managed by the Lighthouse Area Command of the Italian Navy (Marina Militare) based in Venice, which overseas its operation as a navigational aid. Since July 1, 2026, when the management of cultural functions in Italy was transferred from the provinces, the FVG Autonomous Region has managed the lighthouse site as a cultural resource.

== Visiting ==
The site of the lighthouse is open to the public. The lighthouse itself is open Saturday and Sunday 3 pm to 7 pm, from the last Saturday of April to the second Sunday of October. Reaching the top requires climbing 285 steps.

Until the lighthouse closed for renovation in 1979, the public could visit the structure's upper section, which houses its navigational equipment. Since the lighthouse reopened to public in 1986, visitors have had access only to the lower, monumental portion of the structure. For safety reasons, no more than 15 people are allowed inside the lighthouse at a time, always under the supervision of an employee. Groups of up to 40 people must arrange visits in advance.

== Gallery ==
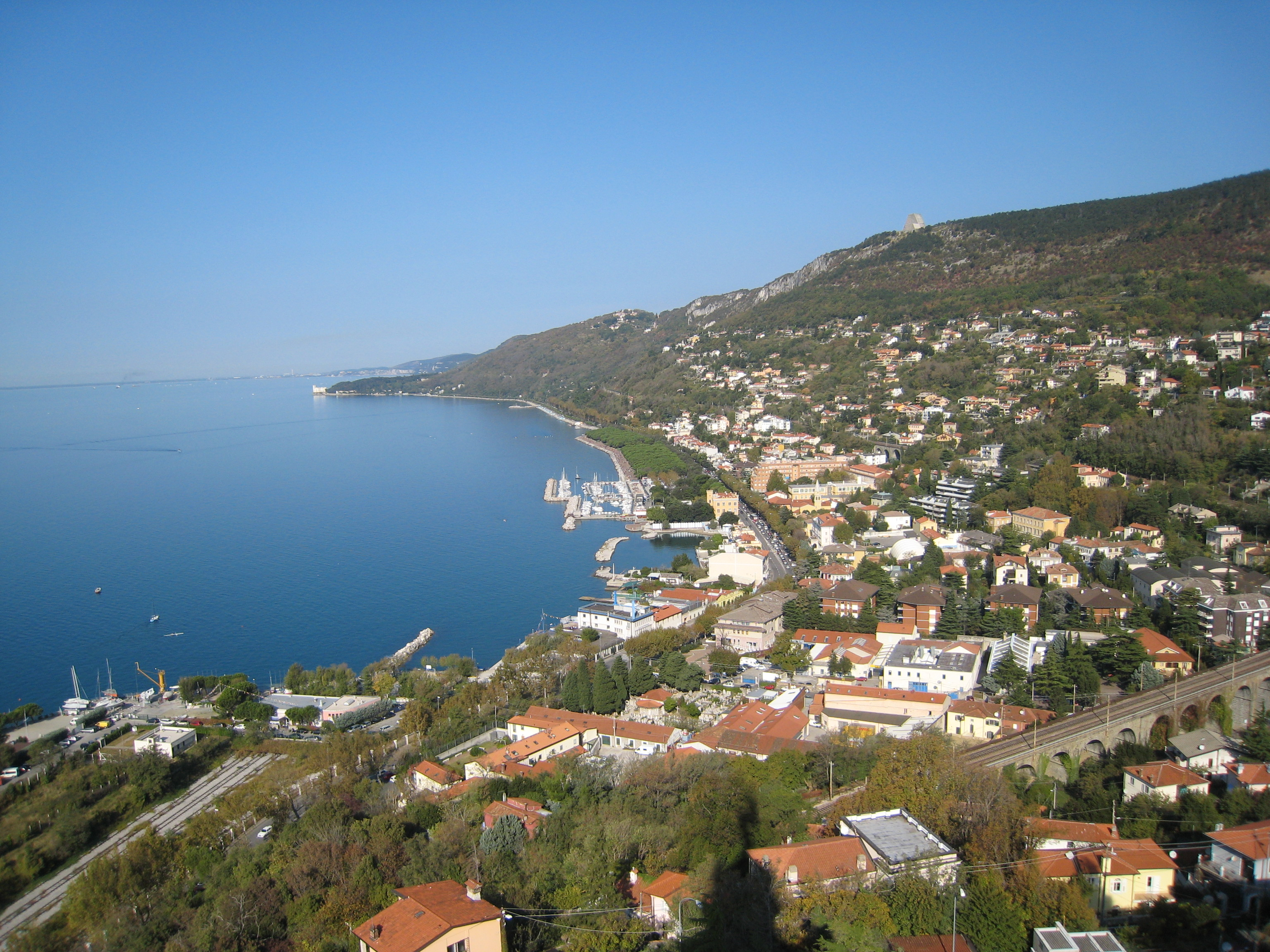
The view from Vittoria Light.

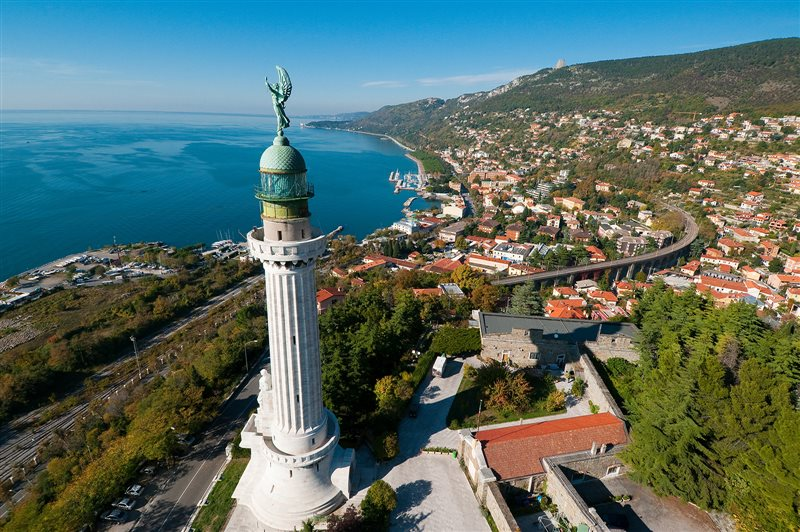
Vittoria Light.

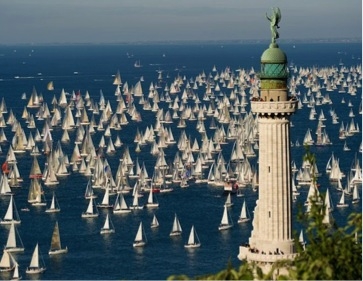
The light with the Barcolana taking place in the background

== See also ==
- List of tallest lighthouses in the world
- List of lighthouses in Italy
