= Snake Island Integrated Free Zone =

- Economic development area
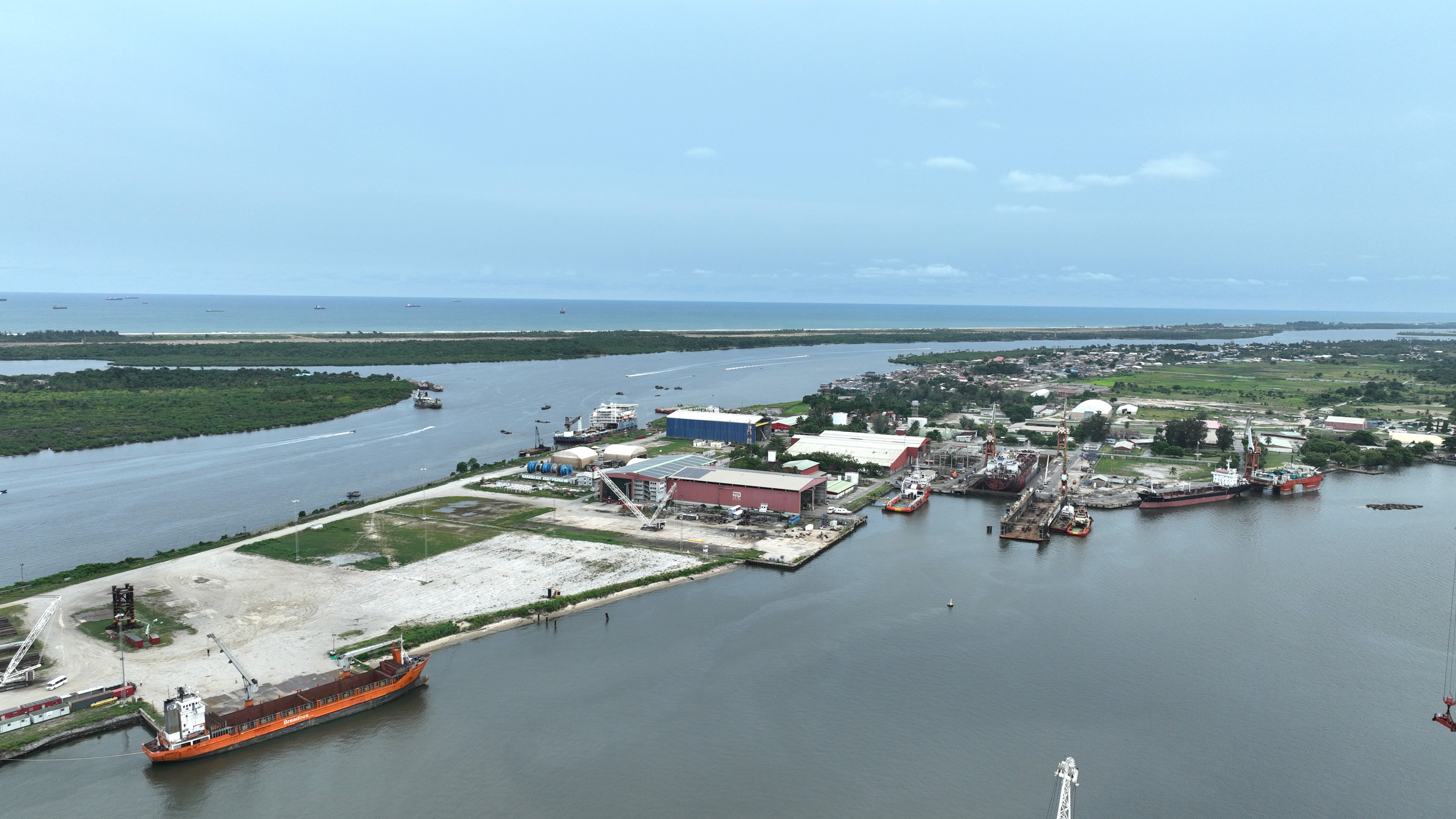
- Aerial view of Snake Island Integrated Free Zone
- Country: Nigeria
- Nearest city: Lagos

Snake Island Integrated Free Zone (SIIFZ) is a West African economic development area, established and operated by Nigerdock. It is strategically located on 252 hectares of land and infrastructure within the main harbour of Lagos, Nigeria and along the main navigation channel adjacent to Tin Can Island and Apapa ports, with immediate access to the open sea.

SIIFZ offers an integrated platform for logistics, trading, and manufacturing companies to establish operations in Nigeria with a low cost of entry, while benefiting from available seaport, land, and power infrastructure to handle international and regional operations. It also offers opportunities for investors looking to establish a base for the West African market.

== History ==
As diversification intensified in the Nigerian economy, the development of free zones to enable international entrepreneurs and organisations to participate in Nigerian and West African Deepwater Projects and many more, while enhancing the country, became of great importance.

Snake Island Integrated Free Zone (SIIFZ) was established and incorporated in Apapa following the acquisition of presidential approval for the Free Zones in January 2005 and finally became operational on 4 July 2005.

Established in 2005, it is the first registered and operational privately owned free zone in Nigeria and operates under the Nigeria Export Processing Zones Authority (NEPZA) Decree 1992, Decree No. 63 as recorded in the Federal Republic of Nigeria Official Gazette No. 67 Vol. 79, dated 21 December 1992.

Snake Island Integrated Free Zone is currently managed by Snake Island Management Company (SIMCO) and has generated over US

$600m investment within the zone. SIIFZ is open 24/7/365 and can be accessed through the commercial centres of Lekki, Ikoyi, Ikorodu, Festac, Apapa and Victoria Island by ferry and boat.

Aerial Views of Snake Island Integrated Free Zone

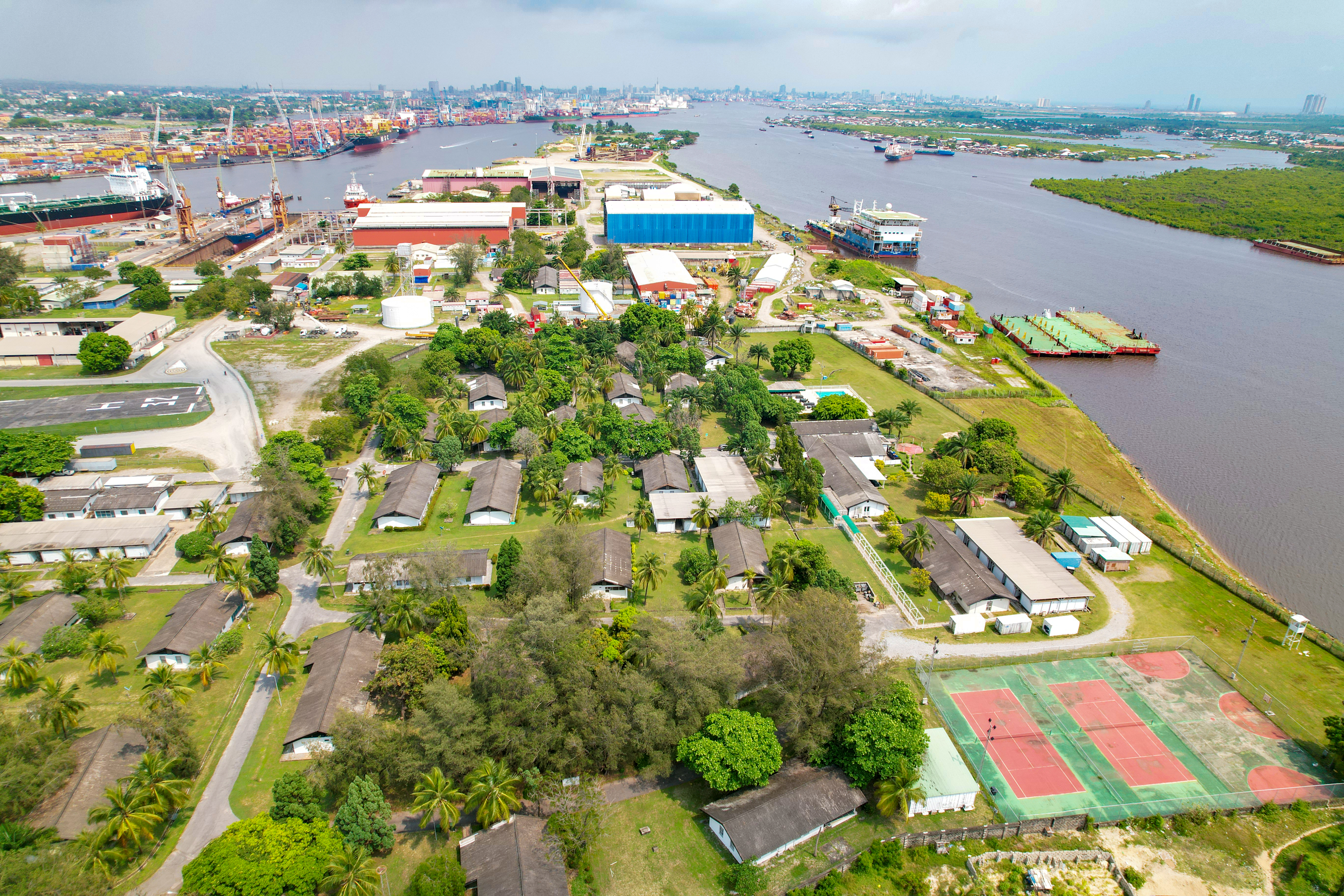

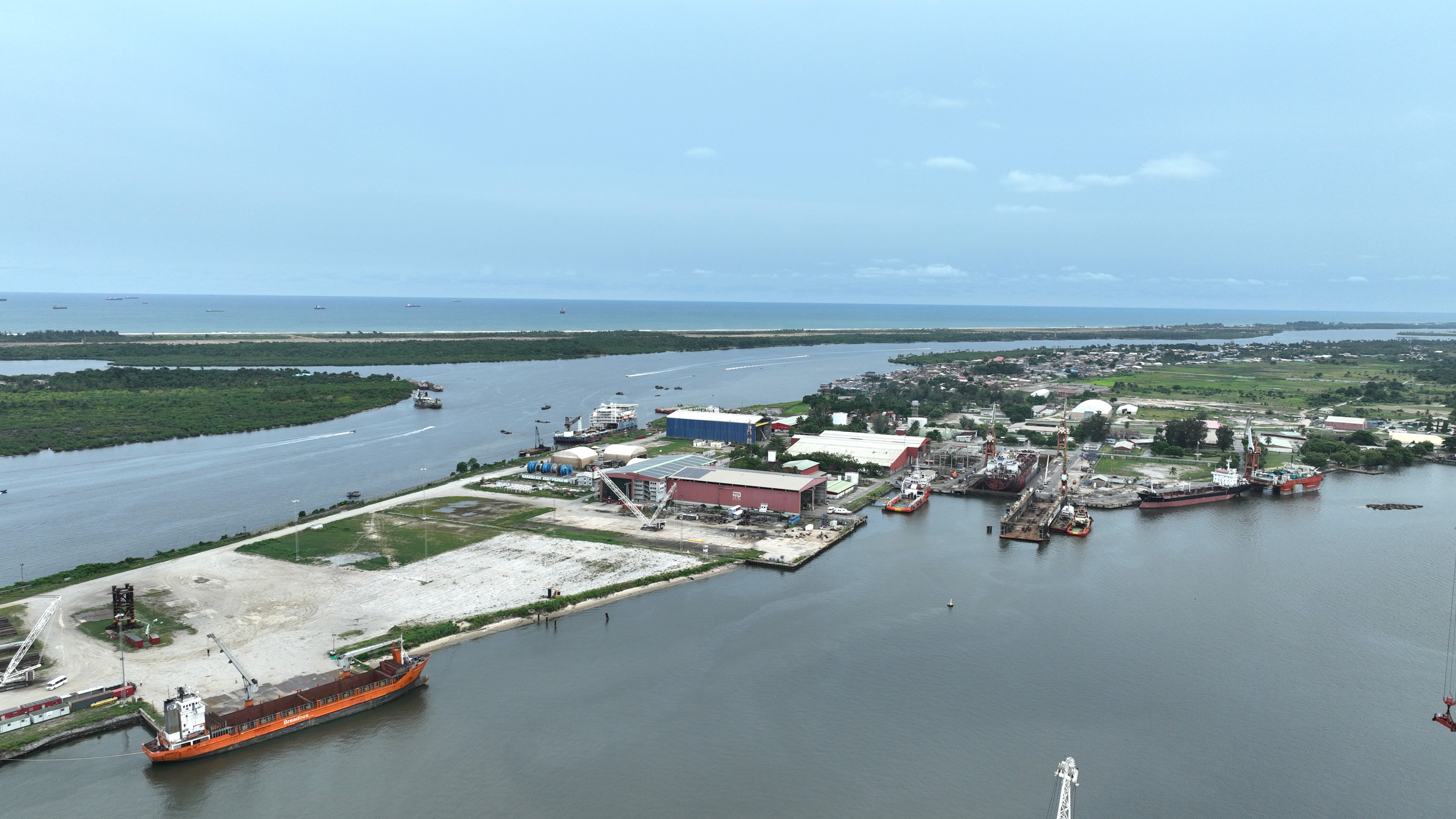

== Services and Operations ==
Snake Island Integrated Free Zone has 10 free zone enterprises currently operating within the zone. These enterprises provide a wide range of activities including waste management, banking services, forklift services, engineering, port operation and maritime, HR business support and outsourcing services amongst others. These enterprises operating in Snake Island Integrated Free Zone have added significant value to the Free Zone and the Nigerian Economy.

It is also home to Snake Island Port, an 85-hectare multipurpose port facility with three terminals.

=== Key services within SIIFZ include ===
- Marine Services
- Terminal Operations
- Industrial Estate Solutions

== Achievements ==
- Generated over 10,000 direct and indirect jobs within the zone.
- In 2016, SIIFZ supported the engineering and fabrication projects for the Egina FPSO vessel.
- Delivered over 27,000 training programmes facilitated by some of the FZEs on site, including Nigerdock.
- Registered as an active member of the Africa Economic Zones Organization (AEZO)
- Registered as a Voting Member of the World Free Zones Organization (World FZO)
- SIIFZ and Nigerdock received approval from the Federal Government of Nigeria for the commencement and expansion of Snake Island Port.
