= Nigerdock =

Nigerian maritime and logistics company

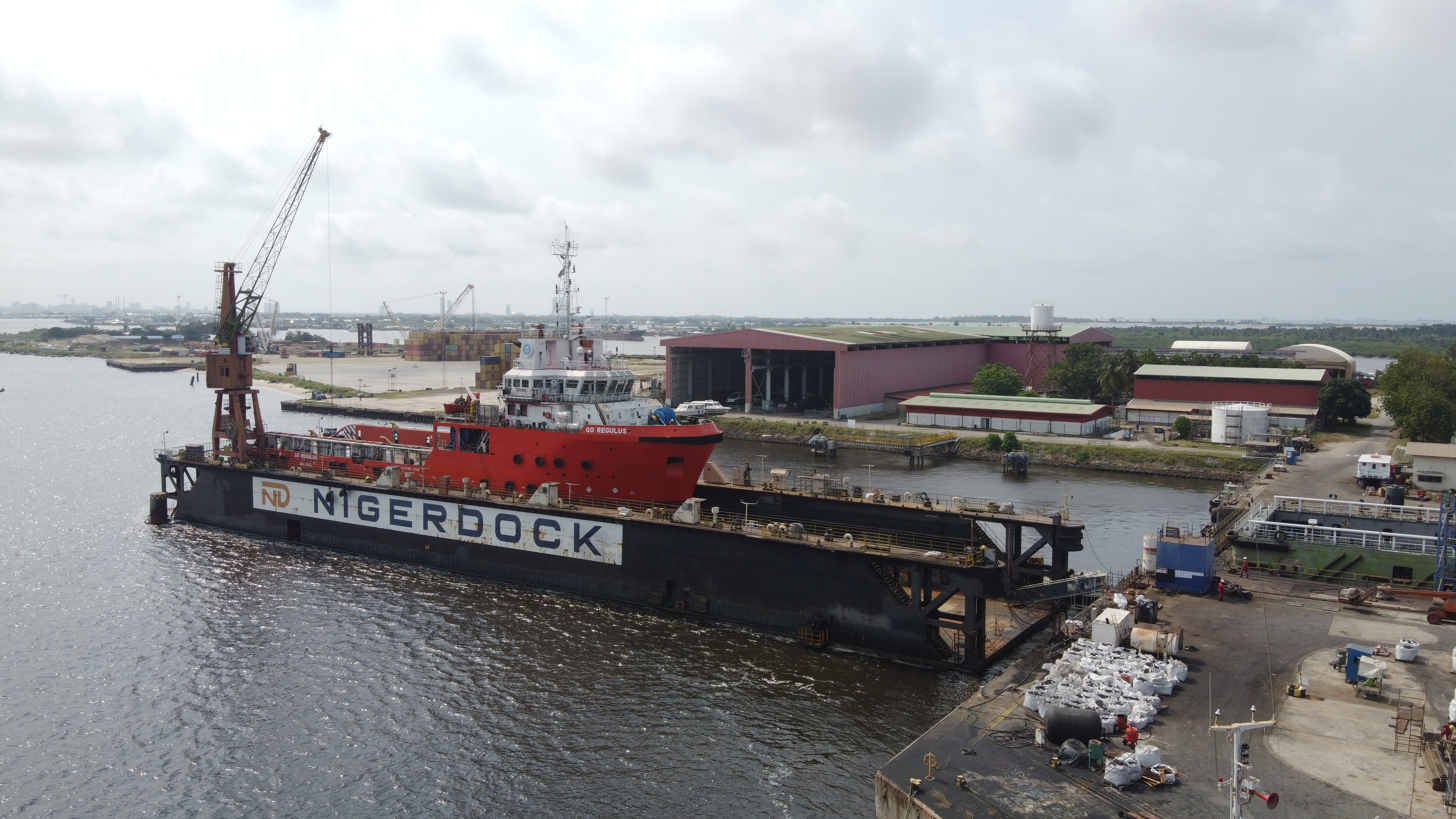
- Nigerdock Aerial View 1 NIgerdock Aerial View

Nigerdock is a Nigerian maritime and logistics company that operates an integrated port and free zone in Lagos, providing terminal operations, marine services, logistics, and free zone solutions.

== History ==
Established by the Federal Government of Nigeria in 1986, Nigerdock was privatized in 2001 under the administration of President Olusegun Obasanjo and subsequently acquired by Jagal Group in 2003.

In 2005, Nigerdock gained Free Zone and Port status, leading to the establishment of the Snake Island Integrated Free Zone. The company began direct shipping in 2017 after approvals from the Nigerian Ports Authority and Customs.

== Community investment ==
In 2024, Nigerdock completed community development projects worth over ₦1.5 billion in Igbologun, Lagos. The projects included the construction of junior and senior secondary school buildings, a police station, a 1.5-kilometre access road, a jetty and the donation of buses to the community. The projects formed part of the company's long-term engagement with its host communities and were handed over to the Lagos State Government and relevant authorities.

== Awards and recognition ==
- In 2023, Nigerdock received the Leadership Award (Category A) at the ECOWAS Quality Awards, organised by the Economic Community of West African States (ECOWAS) and the United Nations Industrial Development Organization (UNIDO). The award recognised the company's contributions to quality management, operational excellence and economic development in West Africa.
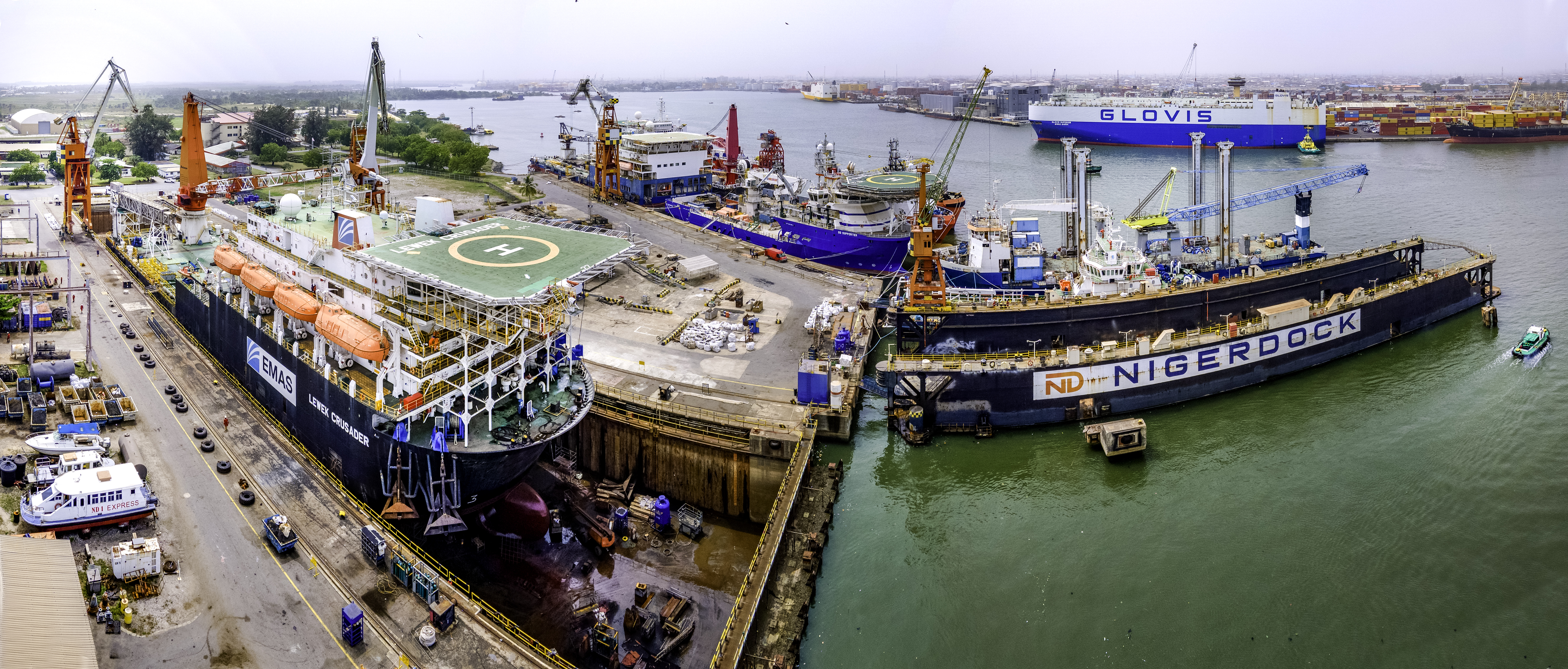

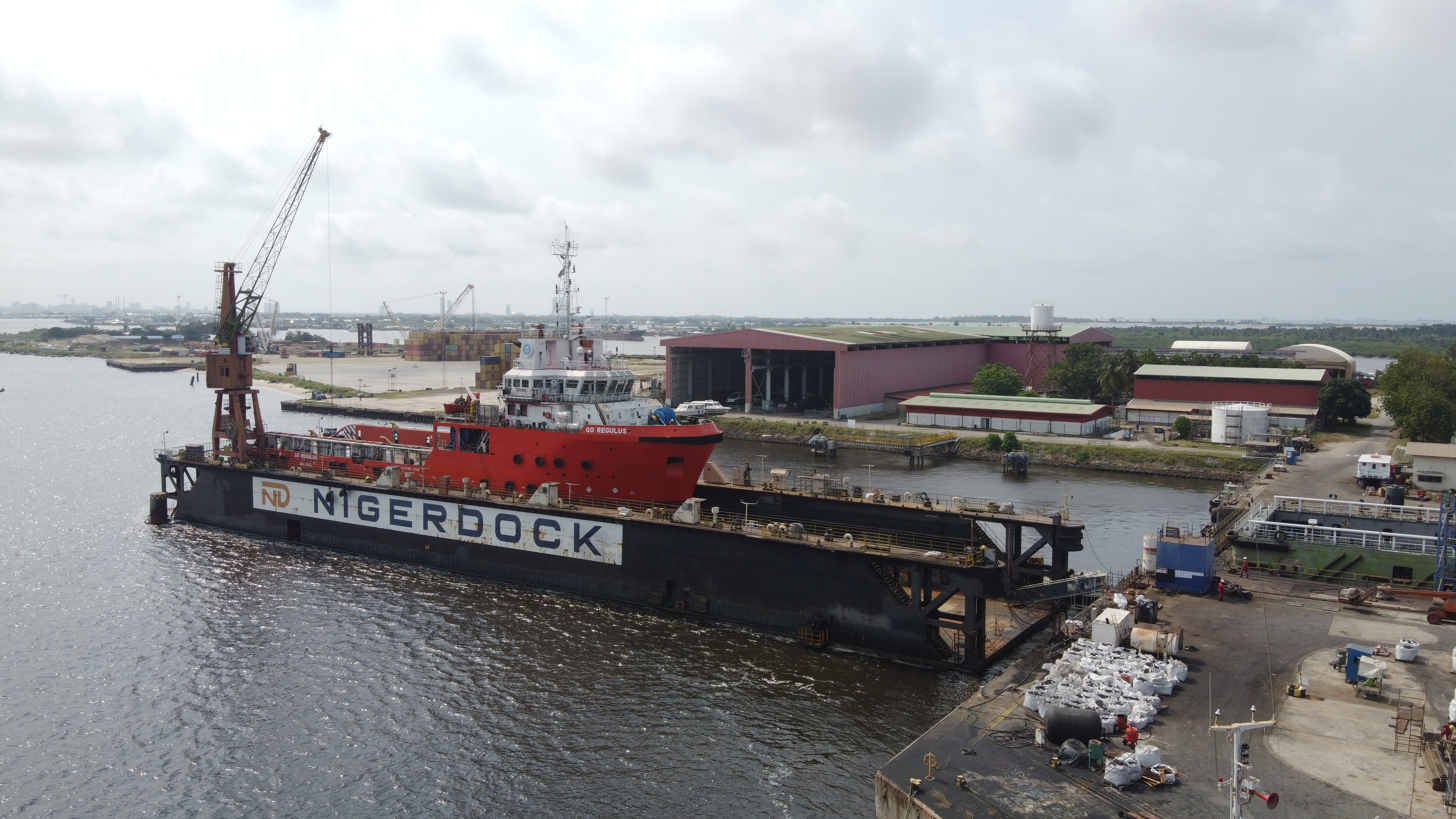
