= Round Ireland Yacht Race =

- First held: 1980
- Start: Wicklow
- Finish: Wicklow
- Website: http://roundireland.ie

The Round Ireland Yacht Race is Ireland’s premier offshore yacht race and is held every two years by Wicklow Sailing Club in association with the Royal Irish Yacht Club and Royal Ocean Racing Club. The 704 nautical mile race was first held in 1980 and still retains the original course; “leave Ireland and all its islands excluding Rockall to starboard.” The latest edition of the race started on 20th June 2026.

== History ==
The concept of a race around Ireland began in 1975 with a double-handed race starting and finishing in Bangor organized by Ballyholme Yacht Club with stopovers in Crosshaven and Killybegs. That race only had four entries. In 1980 Michael Jones put forward the idea of a non-stop race and was held in that year from Wicklow Sailing Club. Sixteen pioneers entered that race with Brian Coad’s Raasay of Melfort returning home after six days at sea to win the inaugural race.

== Records ==
The outright Round Ireland race record of 38 h 37 min 7 s is held by MOD-70 trimaran Musandam-Oman Sail and was set in June 2016.

The monohull Round Ireland race record of 50 h 24 min and 9 s is held by George David's Rambler 88 from Newport, RI, USA was also set in the 2016 race.

The previous record (65 h 48 min 47 s) was held by Mike Slade’s ICAP Leopard set in 2008, a race dominated by gale-force winds, the 100 foot super maxi knocked over 10 hours off the previous race record, set in 1998 by Colm Barrington's Jeep Cherokee.

In a close fought race for line honours in the 2016 race, Musandam-Oman Sail finished just minutes before Ned Collier-Wakefield's Concise-10 and Lloyd Thornburg's Phaedo-3. All three boats broke the previous record of 40 h 51 min 57 s also set by Musandam-Oman Sail in 2015 , which had replaced the long-standing 1993 record of 44 h 42 min 20 s set by Steve Fossett's 60 foot trimaran Lakota. (Both of which were set in scheduled (i.e. non-race) attempts)

== Winners ==
Year	Winner	Skipper	Line Honours	Skipper	Time	Starters	Finishers
2020	Race cancelled due to COVID-19						
2018	Baraka GP	Niall Dowling	Baraka GP	Niall Dowling	3:23:20:44	48	41
2016	Rambler 88	George David	Rambler 88	George David	2:02:24:09	50	37
2014	Tanit	Richard Harris	Monster Project	David Ryan	4:04:25:25	36	33
2012	Inis Mor	Bernard & Laurent Gouy	Green Dragon	Enda O'Coineen	3:17:01:16	37	37
2010	Tonnerre de Breskens 3	Piet Vroon	Tonnerre de Breskens 3	Piet Vroon	3:16:03:50	37	36
2008	Ireland West	Aodhan Fitzgerald	ICAP Leopard	Mike Slade	2:17:48:47	41	30
2006	Cavatina	Eric Lisson	Konica Minolta Zara		4:04:57:30	39	36
2004	Calyx Voice & Data	Eamon Crosbie	O2 Team Spirit	David Nixon	3:04:48:39	47	37
2002	Cavatina	Eric Lisson	Team Tonic	Nick Hewson	3:11:34:50	28	24
2000	Imp	George Radley	Fenix	R Balding	5:12:41:10	28	26
1998	Jeep Cherokee	Colm Barrington	Jeep Cherokee	Colm Barrington	3:04:23:57	38	27
1996	Big Ears	Michael Boyd	Bridgestone	Mike Slade	3:15:58:58	55	55
1994	Bridgestone	Peter Wilson	Virgin City Jet	Dix/Power/Barrington	3:16:30:33	53	36
1992	Whirlpool	Colm Barrington	Whirlpool	Colm Barrington	4:00:43:06	46	33
1990	Rothmans	Laurie Smith	Rothmans	Laurie Smith	3:12:56:06	61	35
1988	Lightning	Liam Shanahan	Moonduster	Denis Doyle	4:20:15:46	52	42
1986	Spirit	R. Burrows	Mazda Drum	M. O'Leary/T. Power	4:03:35:43	27	27
1984	Moonduster	Denis Doyle	Moonduster	Denis Doyle	4:03:45:25	17	13
1980	Raasay of Melfort	B. Coad	Force Ten-Sion	A.J. Vernon/J.S. Morris	5:15:02:27	16	10
