= Fastnet Race =

Biennial offshore yacht race

- Official logo of the 2011 Fastnet Race
- First held: 1925
- Start: Cowes
- Finish: Plymouth (1925–2019); Cherbourg (since 2021)
- Champion: Lann Ael 2; Concise 10 (line honours)
- Website: rolexfastnetrace.com

The Fastnet Race is a biennial offshore yacht race organized by the Royal Ocean Racing Club (RORC) of the United Kingdom with the assistance of the Royal Yacht Squadron in Cowes and the City of Cherbourg in France.

The race is named after the Fastnet Rock off southern Ireland, which the race course rounds. Along with Sydney to Hobart Yacht Race and the Newport-Bermuda Race, it is considered one of the classic big offshore races with each distance approximately 625 nautical miles (719 mi; 1,158 km), testing both inshore and offshore skills, boat and crew preparation and speed potential. From its inception, the Fastnet Race has proven highly influential in the growth of offshore racing and remains closely linked to advances in yacht design, sailing technique and safety equipment.

The Fastnet Race has been sponsored by the Swiss watch manufacturing company Rolex since 2001. The Race prize is known as the Fastnet Challenge Cup.

The race's main focus is on monohull handicap racing, which is presently conducted under the Royal Ocean Racing Club's own IRC Rating Rule, which is awarded the overall trophy. However, the race has recently opened to more classes, including multihulls and providing one design class starts for the Volvo Ocean Race Class, IMOCA 60 and Class40. It has also seen an increase in participation in double-handed racing.

== Course ==
The Fastnet is a challenging race. Taking place in August, the race is often provided with Westerlies that are strong to gale force in strength. The succession of low pressure systems which advance on Ireland and Britain across the North Atlantic Ocean provide a constantly moving weather pattern for which Fastnet navigators must plan. These depressions are mostly centered north of the English Channel. Knowledge of where meteorological disturbances are likely to occur, and how best to use them, is key to success in the race.

=== 1925 to 2019 course ===
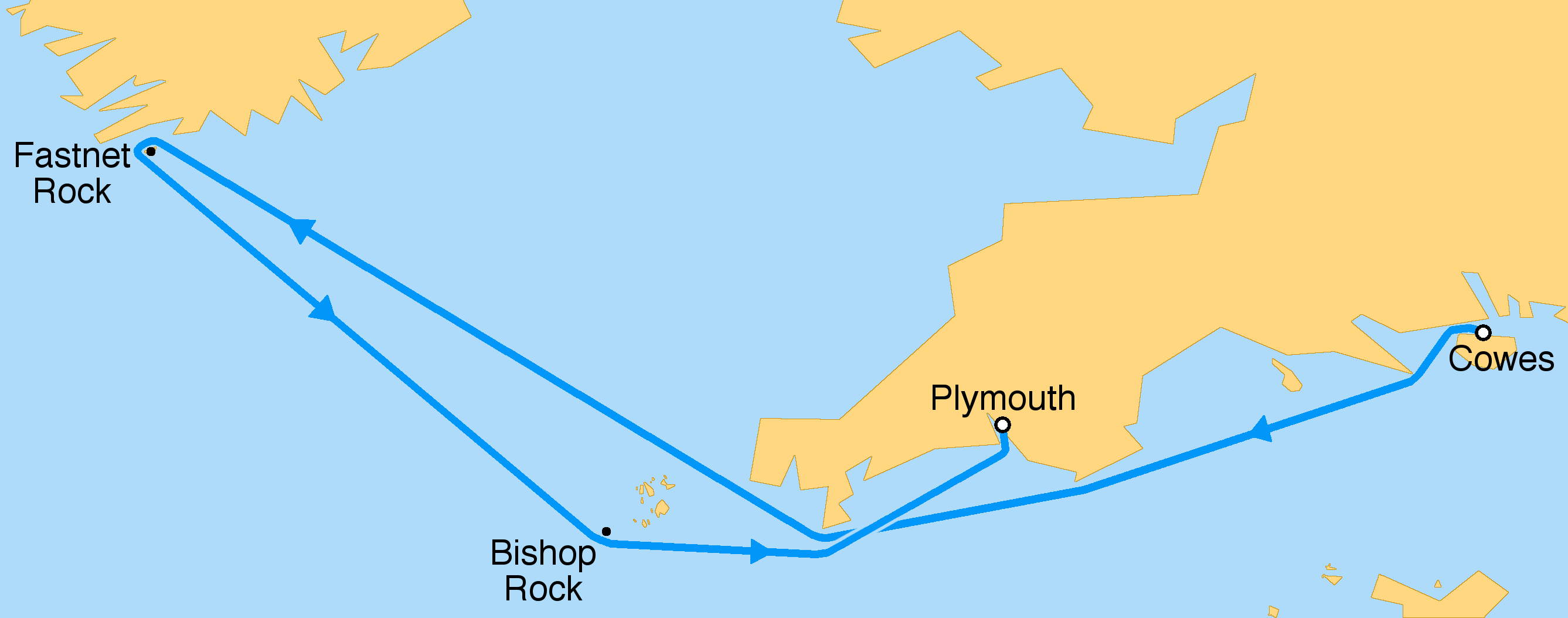
Original course (1925–2019)

The Fastnet Race took place every two years over a course of 608 nautical miles (1,126 km; 700 mi). The race started off Cowes on the Isle of Wight on the south coast of England at the Royal Yacht Squadron. Leaving the Solent through the Needles Channel, the race followed the southern coastline of England westward down the English Channel before rounding Land's End. After crossing the Celtic Sea, the race rounded the Fastnet Rock off the southwest coast of Ireland. Returning on a largely reciprocal course, the race rounded the Isles of Scilly before finishing at Plymouth.

The Royal Western Yacht Club, which supported the RORC with the finish of the race in Plymouth, now runs a race on the original course.

=== 2021 course ===
Beginning in 2021 the course finishes at Cherbourg instead of Plymouth. The remainder of the course is the same. The finish was changed to Cherbourg from Plymouth in order to accommodate increased fleet sizes. Facilities at Plymouth were cited by organizers as one of the main reasons for the change. This was not universally welcomed due to the nearly 100 year heritage of the course and race. This change also increases the course distance to over 700 nautical miles (1,300 km).

Coastal landmarks passed along the route include: The Needles, Portland Bill, Start Point, The Lizard, Land's End, the Fastnet Rock, Bishop's Rock off Scilly, and Cherbourg breakwater.

== History ==
Weston Martyr, a British yachtsman, conceived the idea of the race after having competed in Bermudian yacht races. Entered by seven vessels, the inaugural Fastnet Race was won by Jolie Brise in 1925. Hugh Grosvenor, 2nd Baron Stalbridge won in 1927 with Tally Ho over a field of 15 starters which was eventually whittled down by stormy weather to two finishers. The race ran annually until 1931, and subsequently biennially apart from a break after 1939 during World War II, resuming in 1947. The original rules limited the class to Thames Measurement, and size to between 30 ft and 50 ft WL maximum. Yachts of the International Class rule were specifically excluded because they were regarded as unsuitable for the blue waters of the Atlantic Ocean.

=== 1979 Fastnet Race ===
A severe European windstorm during the 1979 race resulted in the deaths of 21 people (15 competing yachtsmen and 6 observers) and the involvement of some 4,000 others in what became the largest-ever rescue operation in peacetime. The disaster led to a major overhaul of the rules and the equipment required for the competition. Several books have since been written about the 1979 race, which remains notorious in the yachting world for its loss of life. In the 1979 race, "15 sailors died, five boats sank, and at least 75 boats flipped upside down".

=== Capsize of Drum (1985) ===
The race drew further attention from outside the sport in 1985 when the maxi yacht Drum capsized after the keel sheared off due to a design error. The boat was helmed by the New Zealander Phil Holland, brother of its designer Ron Holland. Pop star Simon Le Bon from Duran Duran, co-owner and crew member of Drum, was trapped under the hull with five other crew members for twenty minutes, until being rescued by the Royal Navy. The Search and Rescue Diver was Petty Officer Air Crewman (POACMN) Larry "Scouse" Slater of 771 Naval Air Squadron who appeared on This Is Your Life on 9 April 1986.

=== 1999 Fastnet Race ===
Many of the fleet contestants experienced a total solar eclipse in the Celtic Sea on the way to the Fastnet Rock.

=== 2007 Fastnet Race ===
The RORC in 2007 set an entry limit of 300 boats for the first time. The start of the 2007 Race was postponed by 25 hours, due to a severe weather warning. This was the first time this had been done in the race's 83-year history. Overnight gale force winds and resulting extreme seas forced over three-quarters of the boats to retire, sheltering in ports along the south coast of England, including Torbay, Plymouth and Weymouth.

By 10:00hrs on 16 August, 207 boats of the 271-strong field had retired with at least three suffering rig problems.

Despite the conditions, Mike Slade's Icap Leopard 3, launched in June 2007, set a new record of 44 hours 18 min, taking almost 9 hours off the previous record set in 1999. Ger O'Rourke's Chieftain was the overall winner on corrected time.

=== Capsize of Rambler 100 (2011) ===
A record number of 320 boats entered the 2011 race – the largest total since the ill-fated 1979 race (303 entries). A total of nineteen nations were represented, with the bulk of entries still from Britain and France.

In 2011, the 100-foot canting keel racing sloop Rambler 100 designed by Juan Kouyoumdjian turtled after her keel broke off between Fastnet Rock and the Pantaenius Buoy (a temporary race mark placed southwest of the Fastnet Rock). "Shortly after the turn her canting keel snapped off just below the hull exit causing her to capsize, in less than 60 seconds." All 21 crew were rescued safely. Sixteen were rescued from the upturned hull, by the RNLI Baltimore Lifeboat Hilda Jarrett. A further 5 crewmembers, including the American owner/skipper George David, had floated away from the vessel, but managed to link themselves together. They were in the water for approximately 2.5 hours, before being rescued by a Baltimore, Ireland based diving vessel, Wave Chieftain. One of these crewmembers, Wendy Touton, suffered hypothermia and was taken by helicopter to Tralee General Hospital. Four crew-members had been below decks at the time of capsize and were not adequately dressed for egress into the sea. All uninjured crew were taken to Baltimore. The Naval Service patrol ship LÉ Aoife remained with the hull, worth $10,000,000 before the capsize, before it was towed to Barleycove by the Castletownbere-based tug Ocean Bank. On 25 October 2011 US Sailing published an inquiry into the failure, which recommended "changes to the ISAF Offshore Special Regulations to require boats with movable ballast to have ready escape capability and safety equipment accessible if the boat becomes inverted." It also recommended "several changes to offshore racing regulations and procedures including full implementation of required ISAF Survival Training in the US for offshore sailors."

The Fastnet Monohull Race record was set at 42hrs 39min by Volvo Open 70 Abu Dhabi, skippered by Ian Walker.

=== 2013 Fastnet Race ===
Plymouth Yacht Haven was selected as host port. RORC increased the number of entries to meet demands. The entry limit of 300 filled within 24 hours, and over 100 boats were on the waiting list with entries from multihulls, IMOCA 60s and Class 40s.

Jolie Brise also returned to race in 2013 on her Centenary year, arriving back in port just as the medal ceremony was taking place.

Winners (the following results are to be considered provisional): IRC Overall: Night And Day, a JPK 10.10 owned by Pascal Loison; MOCRA Multihull: Oman Air - Musandam, a MOD 70 class trimaran owned by Sidney Gavignet.

=== 2015 Fastnet Race ===
The 340-boat registration limit was reached in 4 minutes and 24 seconds setting a new record.

Winners:

IRC Overall: Courrier Du Leon, a JPK 10.10 owned by Géry Trentesaux.

MOCRA Multihull: Spindrift 2 a VPLP owned by Yann Guichard and Dona Bertarelli.

Line Honours: 2 Days 15 Hours 42 Minutes - Comanche - VPLP/Verdier 100 Super Maxi owned by Jim and Kristy Hinze Clark, skippered by Ken Read

=== 2017 Fastnet Race ===
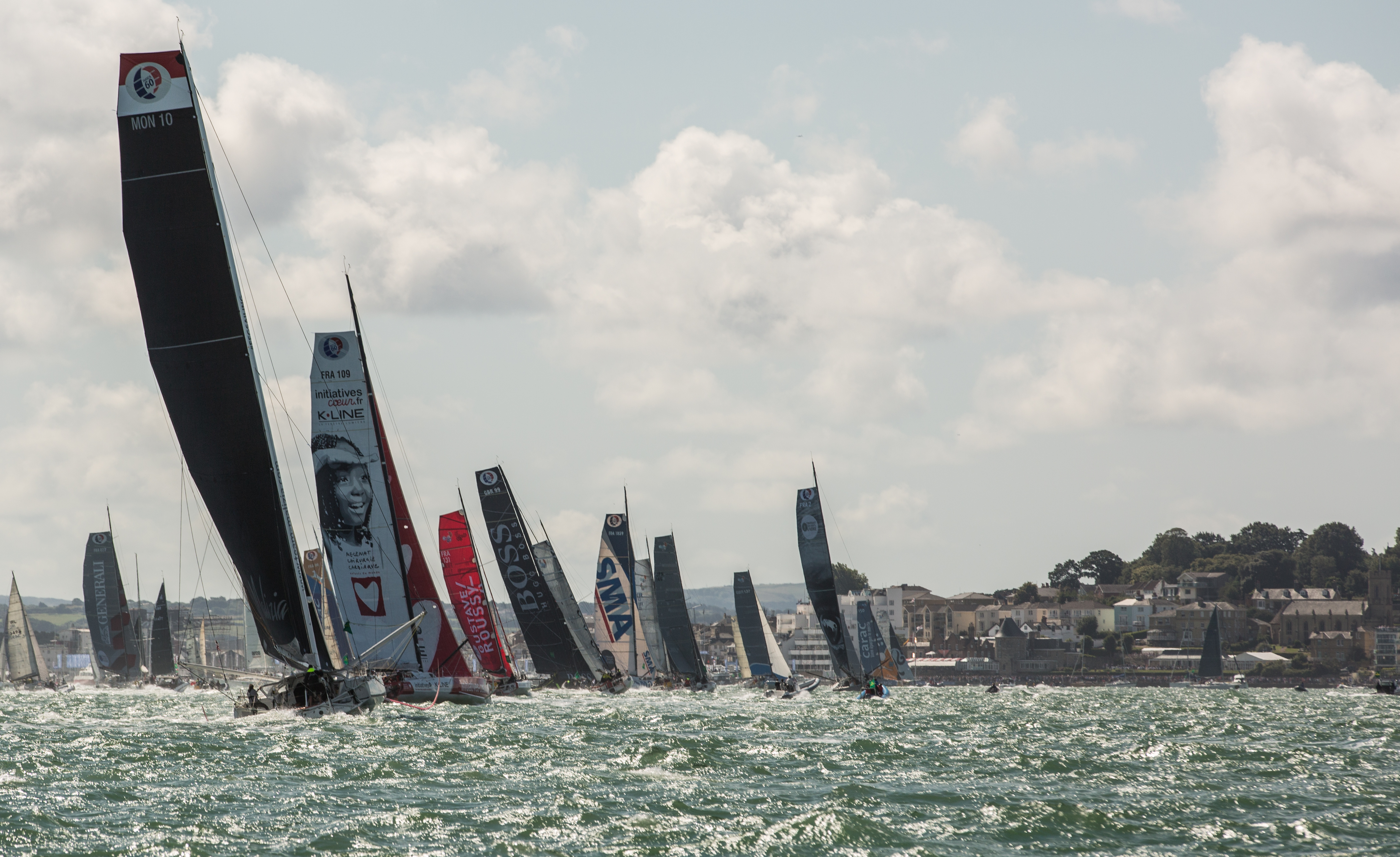
Yachts racing off Cowes at the start of the 2017 Fastnet Race.

The 2017 Fastnet Race started on 6 August 2017 and featured all 2017-2018 Volvo Ocean Race Teams. Yachts longer than 100 feet were also allowed to race.

Winners:

IRC Overall: Lann Ael 2, a Juan Kouyoumdjian designed 39-footer owned by Didier Gaudoux.

MOCRA Multihull: Concise 10 a MOD 70 class trimaran owned by Tony Lawson.

Line Honours: 1 Day 18 hours and 55 minutes – Concise 10 – MOD 70 owned by Tony Lawson, skippered by Ned Collier Wakefield.

=== 2019 Fastnet Race ===
The 2019 Fastnet Race started on 3 August 2019. For the first time, boats not following the IRC standard were allowed to enter the competition. All entries were filled within four minutes and 37 seconds when entry opened on 7 January.

Skipper Franck Cammas took Multihull line honours, despite running aground within the first few hours. This was the first sub-30 hour run, beating Loick Peyron and the crew of Banque Populaire's 2011 time by 4h 45m. The Macif of Francois Gabbart lost the line honours by only 58 seconds, having led just minutes in prior. In third place, was the Sodebo Ultim 3 of Thomas Coville.

The adjusted time race was won by Wizard, a Volvo Open 70, owned by David and Peter Askew and sailed by Charlie Enright.

=== 2021 Fastnet Race ===
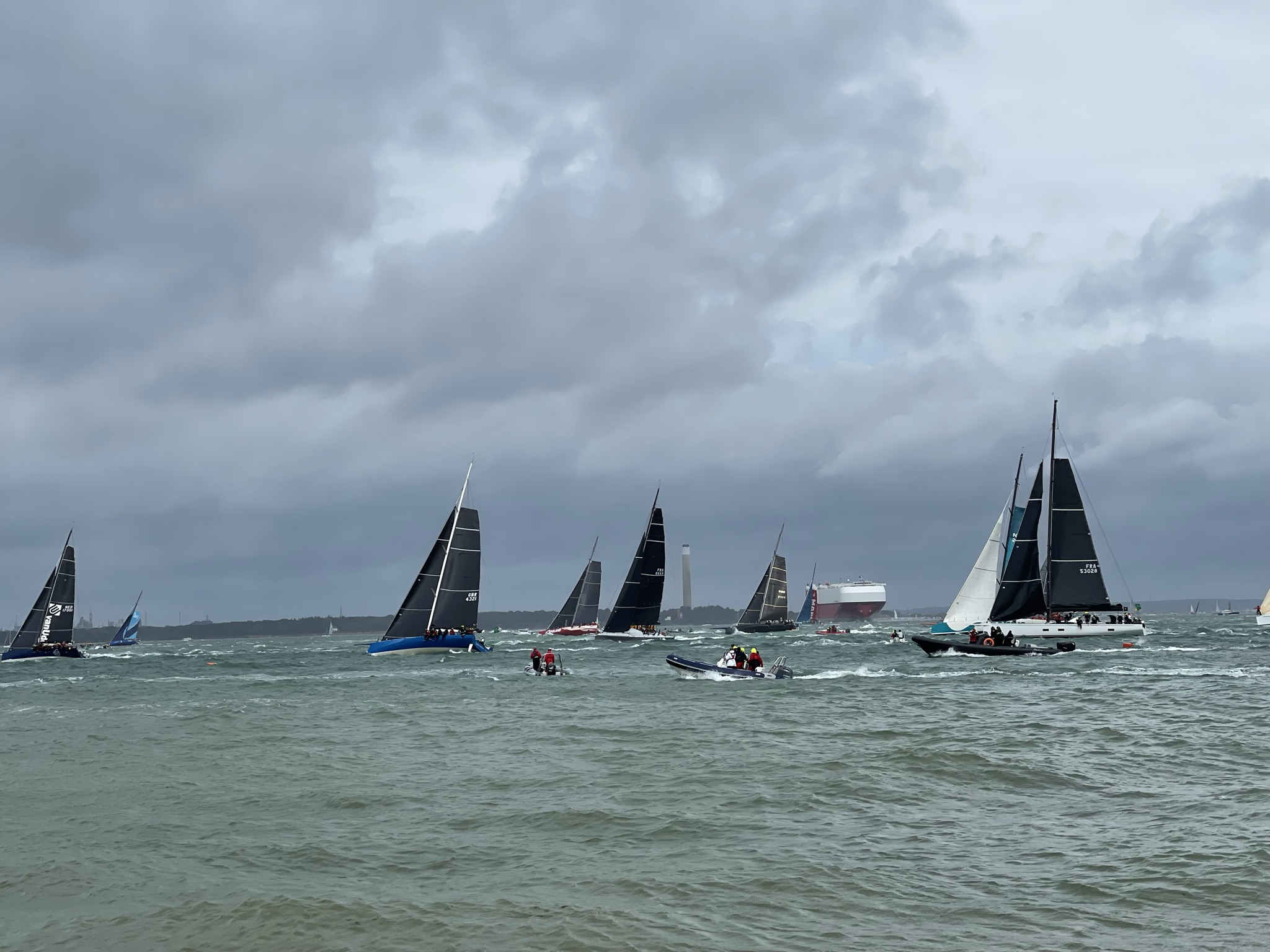
Scenes off Cowes seafront at the start

2021 was the first year where the race finish was in Cherbourg. It started on 8 August 2021 in a strong south westerly breeze.

Winners:

IRC Overall: Sunrise, a JPK 1180 owned by Thomas Kneen and navigated by Tom Cheney and Suzy Peters

MOCRA Multihull: Allegra, a 84 ft Nigel Irens designed catamaran sailed by Adrian Keller

IMOCA 60: Apivia sailed by Charlie Dalin and Paul Meilhat

=== 2023 Fastnet Race ===
A fleet of 424 boats started the 50th running of the Fastnet Race. It began off the Royal Yacht Squadron start line at Cowes on the Isle of Wight in England at 1 pm on 22nd July 2023. 258 crossed the finish line in Cherbourg-en-Cotentin, France.

Multihull Line Honours were claimed by SVR Lazartigue in a time of 1 day, 8 hours, 38 minutes and 27 seconds while the Monohull Line Honours were claimed by MACIF in a time of 2 days, 7 hours, 16 minutes and 26 seconds. Caro (Max Klink) won the Fastnet Challenge Cup.

== Race records ==
=== Original course ===
The monohull race record is 42 hrs 39 min, set by Ian Walker's Volvo Open 70 Abu Dhabi (UAE) in 2011. The other two Volvo Open 70 participating in the 2011 Fastnet Race (Groupama 4 and Team Sanya) also broke the previous record, which had been set by ICAP Leopard in 2007.

The multihull race record is currently 28h 02m 26s by Maxi Edmond de Rothschild. Skipper Franck Cammas took Multihull line honours on 4 August 2019, despite running aground within the first few hours. This was the first sub-30 hour run, beating Loick Peyron and the crew of Banque Populaire's 2011 time by 4h 45m. The MACIF of Francois Gabbart lost the line honours by only 58 seconds, having led just minutes prior.

The World Speed Sailing Record Council also recognises the course record for an official record, which is currently held by Maserati, a MOD 70 skippered by Giovanni Soldini, on 21 May 2021 in a time of 23 hrs, 51 mins and 16 secs, beating the previous record by more than one hour and bringing the record under 24 hours.

=== Revised course ===
In 2021 the course was changed to being from Cowes to Cherbourg in France via the Fastnet Rock.

== Winners ==
=== Corrected time ===
Year	Yacht	Owner	Design	Designer	Ref.
1925	(United Kingdom) Jolie Brise	Lt Cdr E. G. Martin		Alexandre Pâris	
1926	(United Kingdom) Ilex	Royal Engineers		Charles E. Nicholson	
1927	(United Kingdom) Tally Ho	Baron Stalbridge		Albert Strange	
1928	(United States) Niña	Paul Hammond		Starling Burgess	
1929	(United Kingdom) Jolie Brise	Lt Cdr E. G. Martin		Alexandre Pâris	
1930	(United Kingdom) Jolie Brise	Lt Cdr E. G. Martin		Alexandre Pâris	
1931	(United States) Dorade	Roderick Stephens Sr		Sparkman & Stephens	
1933	(United States) Dorade	Roderick Stephens Sr		Sparkman & Stephens	
1935	(United States) Stormy Weather	Philip LeBoutillier		Sparkman & Stephens	
1937	(Netherlands) Zeearend	Kees Bruynzeel		Sparkman & Stephens	
1939	(United Kingdom) Bloodhound	Ike Bell		Camper and Nicholsons	
1947	(United Kingdom) Myth of Malham	Capt. J. H.Illingworth		John Laurent Giles	
1949	(United Kingdom) Myth of Malham	Capt. J. H.Illingworth		John Laurent Giles	
1951	(United Kingdom) Yeoman	Owen Aisher		Camper and Nicholsons	
1953	(United Kingdom) Favona	Sir Michael Newton		Robert Clark	
1955	(United States) Carina	Dick Nye		Philip Rhodes	
1957	(United States) Carina	Dick Nye		Philip Rhodes	
1959	(Sweden) Anitra	Sven Hansen		Sparkman & Stephens	
1961	(Netherlands) Zwerver II	Otto van der Vorm		Sparkman & Stephens	
1963	(United Kingdom) Clarion of Wight	Derek Boyer DFC		Sparkman & Stephens	
1965	(United States) Rabbit	Dick Carter		Dick Carter	
1967	(France) Pen Duick III	Éric Tabarly		Éric Tabarly	
1969	(United States) Red Rooster	Dick Carter		Dick Carter	
1971	(Australia) Ragamuffin	Syd Fischer		Sparkman & Stephens	
1973	(Brazil) Saga	Erling Lorentzen		Sparkman & Stephens	
1975	(United Kingdom) Golden Delicious	Richard & Harvey Bagnall	Nicholson 33	Ron Holland	
1977	(United States) Imp	David Allen		Ron Holland	
1979	(United States) Tenacious	Ted Turner		Sparkman & Stephens	
1981	(Belgium) Mordicus	Taylor and Volterys		Mauric/Gaubert	
1983	(Netherlands) Shamrock	Maller & Snoeren		Hellevoetsluis	
1985	(United Kingdom) Panda	Peter Whipp		Philippe Briand	
1987	(Republic of Ireland) Irish Independent/Full Pelt	Stephen Fein		Ed Dubois	
1989	(United States) Great News	John Calvert-Jones/Tom Blackaller		Farr Yacht Design	
1991	(United Kingdom) Min-O-Din	John Humphries/Matt Humphries		David Thomas	
1995	(Sweden) Nicorette	Ludde Ingvall		Ribadeau-Dumas/Simonis Voogd	
1997	(Sweden) Royal Blue	Gunnar Ekdahl		Ribadeau-Dumas/Simonis Voogd	
1999	(France) Whirlpool-Europe 2	Catherine Chabaud	IMOCA 60	Marc Lombard	
2001	(Netherlands) Tonnerre de Breskens	Piet Vroon	Custom Lutra 52	Lutra Design Group	
2003	(United Kingdom) Nokia Engima	Charles Dunstone	77 ft Maxi	Reichel/Pugh	
2005	(France) Iromiguy	Jean-Yves Chateau	Nicholson 33	Ron Holland	
2007	(Republic of Ireland) Chieftain	Ger O'Rourke	Cookson 50	Farr Yacht Design	
2009	(Sweden) Rán 2	Niklas Zennström	Maxi 72	Judel Vrolijk	
2011	(Sweden) Rán 2	Niklas Zennström	Maxi 72	Judel Vrolijk	
2013	(France) Night and Day	Pascal Loison	JPK 1010	Jacques Valer	
2015	(France) Courrier Du Leon	Géry Trentesaux	JPK 10.80	Jacques Valer	
2017	(France) Lann Ael 2	Didier Gaudoux	IRC39 Custom	Joubert-Nivelt	
2019	(United States) Wizard	David & Peter Askew	Volvo Ocean 70 Modified	Juan Kouyoumdjian	
2021	(United Kingdom) Sunrise	Thomas Kneen	JPK 1180	Jacques Valer	
2023	(Switzerland) Caro	Maximilian Klink	2021' (Modified TP52)	Botin	
2025	(France) Leon	Jean Pierre Kelbert	JPK 1050	Jacques Valer	

=== Monohull Line honours ===
Year	Yacht	Owner	Yacht Type/Designer	Elapsed Time	Ref.
1925	(United Kingdom) Jolie Brise	Lt Cdr E. G. Martin	Alexandre Pâris	6d 03h	
1926	(United Kingdom) Hallowe'en	Col J. F. N. Baxendale	William Fife	3d 19h 05m	
1927	(United States) La Goleta	R. St.L. Beverley	Alden		
1928	(United States) Niña	Paul Hammond & others	Starling Burgess		
1929	(United Kingdom) Jolie Brise	Bobby Somerset	Alexandre Pâris		
1930	(United Kingdom) Jolie Brise	Bobby Somerset	Alexandre Pâris		
1931	(United Kingdom) Patience	H. E. West	Charles Nicholson		
1935	(United Kingdom) Kismet III		William Fife		
1937	(United Kingdom) Bloodhound	Isaac Bell	Charles Nicholson		
1939	(Nazi Germany) Nordwind	Kriegsmarine		3d 16h 23m	
1947	(United Kingdom) Latifa	Michael Mason	William Fife		
1949	(United Kingdom) Latifa	Michael Mason	William Fife		
1951	(Sweden) Circe	Carl Hardeberg	Sparkman & Stephens		
1953	(United Kingdom) Bloodhound	Isaac Bell	Charles Nicholson		
1955	(Spain) Mare Nostrum		Sparkman & Stephens		
1961	(Netherlands) Stormvogel	Cornelius "Cees" Bruynzeel	van de Stadt		
1965	(France) Gitana IV	Edmond de Rothschild		3d 9h 40m	
1971	(United States) American Eagle	Ted Turner			
1977	(Australia) Ballyhoo	Jack Rooklyn			
1979	Condor of Bermuda	Bob Bell	John Sharp	2d 23h 25m	
1981	(Bermuda) Condor	Bob Bell	Ron Holland		
1983	(Bermuda) Condor	Bob Bell	Ron Holland		
1985	(United States) Nirvana	Marvin Green	Dave Pedrick	2d 12h 34m	
1989	(New Zealand) Steinlager II	Peter Blake	Bruce Farr		
1993	(Spain) Galicia '93 Pescanova		Bruce Farr		
1995	(Sweden) Nicorette	Ludde Ingvall	Ribadeau-Dumas/Simonis Voogd		
1997	(Europe) BIL				
1999	(New Zealand) RF Yachting	Ross Field	Farr Grand Mistral 80	2d 05h 08m	
2001	(Italy) Stealth	Gianni Agnelli	Frers 92 Maxi	2d 10h 58m	
2003	(New Zealand) Alfa Romeo I	Neville Crichton	Reichel Pugh 90 Maxi	2d 09h 02m 00s	
2005	(New Zealand) Maximus	EBS Yachting	Elliott 98 Maxi	2d 20h 02m 07s	
2007	(United Kingdom) ICAP Leopard 3	Mike Slade	Farr 98 Maxi	1d 20h 18m 53s	
2009	(United Kingdom) ICAP Leopard 3	Mike Slade	Farr 100 Maxi	2d 11h 09m 36s	
2011	(United Arab Emirates) Abu Dhabi Ocean Racing	Ian Walker (GBR)	Farr Volvo Ocean 70	1d 18h 39m 00s	
2013	(Slovenia) Esimit Europa 2	Igor Simcic	Reichel Pugh 100 Maxi	2d 12h 27m 49s	
2015	(United States) Comanche	Jim Clark & Ken Read	Verdier VPLP 100 Supermaxi	2d 15h 42m 26s	
2017	(United States) Rambler 88	George David	Juan-K 27m Canting Maxi	2d 09h 34m 21s	
2019	(United States) Rambler 88	George David	Juan-K 27m Canting Maxi	1d 19h 55m 02s	
2021	(Russia) Skorpios	Dmitry Rybolovlev	Juan-K ClubSwan 125	2d 08h 33m 55s	
2023	(France) MACIF	Charlie Dalin	Verdier IMOCA 60	2d 07h 16m 26s	
2025	(Monaco) Black Jack 100	Remon Vos	Reichel Pugh 100 Maxi	2d 12h 31m 21s	

=== Multihull Line honours ===
Year	Elapsed Time	Skipper	Yacht	Designer	Ref.
1999	1d 16h 27m	Loick Peyron	Fujicolor	ORMA 60 trimaran	
2001					
2003					
2005					
2007					
2009					
2011	1d 08h 48m 46s	Loick Peyron	(France) Banque Populaire V	VPLP	
2013	1d 14h 53m 58s	Yann Guichard & Dona Bertarelli	(France) Spindrift 2	VPLP	
2015	2d 10h 57m 41s	Yann Guichard & Dona Bertarelli	(France) Spindrift 2	VPLP	
2017	1d 18h 55m 00s	Ned Collier Wakefield	(United Kingdom) Concise 10	MOD 70 Tri - VPLP	
2019	1d 04h 02m 26s	Cyril Dardashti	(France) Gitana 17	100 ft Ultime Tri - Guillaume Verdier	
2021	1d 9h 14m 54s	Cyril Dardashti	(France) Maxi Edmond De Rothschild	Ultim 32/33	
2023	1d 08h 38m 27s	François Gabart	(France) SVR Lazartigue	Ultim 32/33 - VPLP	
2025	1d 17h 18m 04s	Tom Laperche (FRA); Amélie Grassi (FRA); Antoine Gautier (FRA); Emilien Lavigne (FRA); Franck Cammas (FRA); Peter Burling (NZL)	(France) SVR Lazartigue	Ultim 32/33 - VPLP	

=== Class 40 ===
Year	Sail No.	Yacht Name	Sailors	Design	Elapsed Time	Finisher	Starters	Ref.
2009	GBR 30	Initiatives Saveurs - Novedia Group	Tanguy de Lamotte (FRA); Liz Wardley (PNG); Guillaume Le Brec	2007 / Rogers / CMI	3d 15h 19m 30s	18	19	
2011	GBR 30	Initiatives - Alex Olivier	Tanguy de Lamotte (FRA); Thomas GAVERIAUX; Tanguy LEGLATIN; David SINEAU	2007 / Rogers / CMI	3d 14h 17m 28s	17	20	
2013	FRA 130	GDF SUEZ	Sebastien Rogues (FRA); Arthur Le Vaillant; Fabien Delahaye; Bertrand Castelnerac	2013 / Manuard / Mach 40	3d 03h 18m 30s	17	19	
2015	ESP 123	Tales II	Gonzalo Botin (ESP) +Crew	2013 / Botin / Longditud 0	3d 09h 17m 22s	22	23	
2017	FRA 144	V And B	Maxime Sorel (FRA); Antoine CARPENTIER; Sam Manuard (FRA); Jonas GERCKENS	2015 / Manuard / Mach 40.3	3d 03h 22m 27s	23	26	
2019	FRA 153	Lamotte - Module Création	Luke Berry (GBR); Corentin Douguet (FRA); Frédéric Denis (FRA); Arnaud Berland (FRA)	2018 / Manuard / Mach 40.3	2d 11h 13m 22s	15	19	
2021	FRA 160	Palanad 3	Antoine Magre (FRA); Will Harris (GBR); James Crampton (GBR); Damien Arnol (FRA)	2020 / Manuard / Mach 40.4	3d 10h 27m 25s	26	32	
2023	FRA 177	Everial	Erwan Le Draoulec (FRA); Julien Hereu (FRA); Pep Costa (FRA); Robin Follin (FRA)	2022 / Verdier / Pogo S4	03d 10h 22m 02s	17	21	
2025	FRA209	FAITES SNSM.ORG	Corentin Douguet (FRA); Axel Trehin (FRA); Rodrigue Cabaz (FRA); Laurent Pruvost (FRA)	2025 / Lombard / Lift V3	03d 10h 02m 01s	23	23	

=== IMOCA 60 ===
Year	Starters	Finisher	Elapsed Time	Sailors	Sail No.	Yacht Name	Design	Ref.
2005	13	12	3 - 11:42:13	Jean-Pierre Dick (FRA)	FRA06	Virbac-Paprec		
2007	9	14	2 - 02:17:44	Vincent Riou (FRA)	FRA 85	PRB (3)		
2009	11	11	2 - 17:00:15	Sebastien Josse (FRA)	888	BT	2007 - Farr	
2011	6	6	1 - 23:21:27	Vincent Riou (FRA)	FRA 85	PRB (4)		
2013	7	7	2 - 19:22:19	Francois Gabart (FRA)Michel Desjoyeaux (FRA)	FRA 301	MACIF		
2015	8	9	3 - 00:09:53	Vincent Riou (FRA); Nicolas Andrieu; Sebastien Col +Others	FRA 85	PRB (4)		
2019	18	20	2 - 01:32:28	Skipper - Jeremie Beyou (FRA); Co-Skipper - Christopher Pratt (FRA); Crew 1 - Crew 2 - Crew 3 -	FRA 8	Charal	2019 VPLP	
2021	11	12	2 - 16:51:24	Charlie Dalin (FRA); Paul Meilhat (FRA)	FRA79	Apivia	2019 Verdier	
2023	27	29	2 - 07:16:26	Charlie Dalin (FRA); Pascal Bidégorry (FRA)	FRA79	MACIF	2023 Verdier	
2025	6	7	2 - 14:07:05	Elodie Bonafous (FRA); Basile Bourgnon (FRA); Gaston Morvan (FRA); UNKNOWN (FRA)	FRA62	Queguiner	2025 Verdier	
