= Evelyn Martin =

Evelyn Martin may refer to:

- Evelyn Martin (cricketer) (1881–1945), English cricketer, yachtsman and author
- Evelyn Martin (24), a character from the TV series 24
