= Jolie Brise =

Gaff-rigged pilot cutter

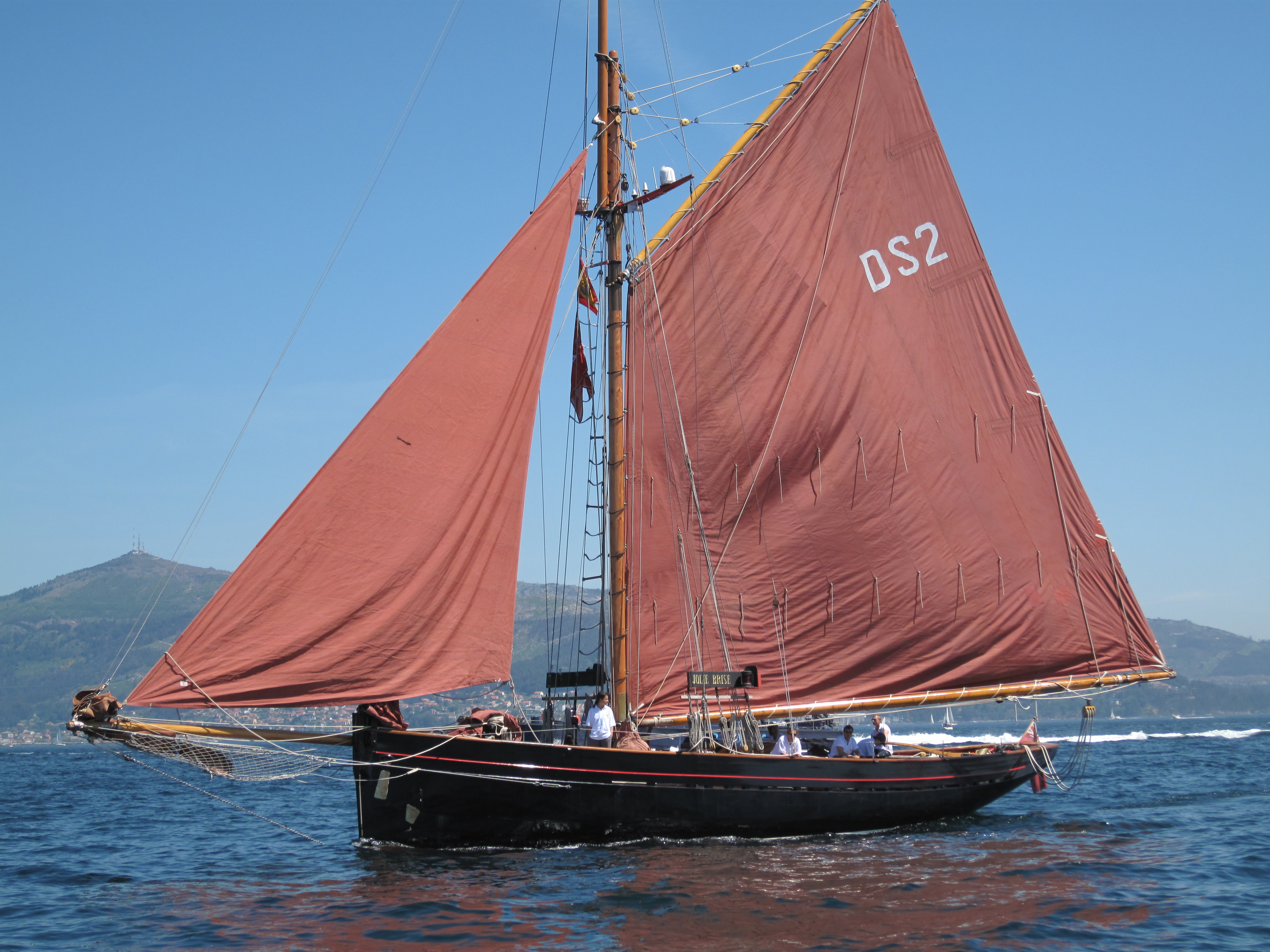

Development
- Designer: Alexandre Pâris
- Location: Le Havre
- Year: 1913
- No. built: 1
- Builder: Albert Paumelle Yard
- Role: Pilot Cutter

Boat
- Displacement: 44,000 kg (97,000 lb)
- Draft: 3.10 m (10 ft 2 in)

Hull
- LOA: 22.50 m (73 ft 10 in)
- LOH: 17.06 m (56 ft)
- LWL: 14.63 m (48 ft)
- Beam: 4.63 m (15 ft 2 in)
- Engine: Gardner

Rig
- General: 1
- Rig type: Gaff

Jolie Brise is a gaff-rigged pilot cutter built and launched by the Albert Paumelle Yard in Le Havre in 1913 to a design by Alexandre Pâris. After a short career as a pilot boat, owing to steam replacing sail, she became a fishing boat, a racing yacht and a sail training vessel.

== 1923–1977 post-pilot history ==
Bought by Evelyn George Martin in 1923 she was refitted and won the first Fastnet Race from seven starters in August 1925. In 1927 Martin sold Jolie Brise, through an advertisement in Yachting World to Captain Warren Ferrier and his partner Dr Brownlow Smith.

An engine and an additional cabin were fitted at Morgan Giles' yard at Teignmouth. Bobby Somerset, a founder member of the Ocean Racing Club – as was Martin, purchased her in 1928. After competing in the Fastnet, Bermuda and Santander races he sold her four years later to Lt. John Gage, RNR.

His ownership was only for a year and it seems that in 1934 she was purchased by an American, Stanley Mortimer. Alterations, mostly to the living accommodation were made at a yard in Palma de Mallorca and a Gardner diesel was fitted in Marseille. After cruising the Mediterranean, and with war in the offing Jolie Brise returned to Southampton and was put up for sale.

She was bought by William Stannard but requisitioned by the Royal Navy which laid her up on a mud berth at Shoreham for the duration of the war. In 1945 she was bought by a syndicate headed by Lillian and Jim Worsdell and her name was changed to Pleasant Breeze.

A voyage to New Zealand was aborted and when she put into Lisbon she was acquired by a Portuguese syndicate headed by Luis Lobato. Repaired and refitted, she was once again listed as Jolie Brise. For nearly 30 years her home port remained Lisbon but in 1975, partly because of the political situation in Portugal, she returned to the Solent, 50 years after her first Fastnet win.

== 1977–present role ==
In 1977 Dauntsey's School secured the use of Jolie Brise by arranging a long-term lease with Jolie Brise's owners, the Exeter Maritime Museum and the International Sailing Craft Association. When the Exeter Maritime Museum moved its collection from Exeter to Lowestoft, Jolie Brise based in the Hamble - was no longer an active part of the Museum. As Dauntsey's pupils had by then maintained and sailed Jolie Brise for 25 years, ISCA offered to sell her to the School. Thus it was that Dauntsey's became the proud owner of Jolie Brise in 2003.

Between 1977 and 1991 she sailed extensively around European waters crewed by students from the School, including winning Tall Ships Races in 1980 and 1986. The students were also involved heavily in the care and maintenance of her.

In 1991 she entered a major refit at Gloucester Docks, which was completed in 1993.

The same year she entered the Fastnet Race again, sixty years after her first time in 1931. After a circumnavigation of the UK in 1994, she has sailed all over Europe, and beyond with crews from the School, hosting other schools and groups of young people and with commercial trainees. In 1996 she returned to Portugal to visit Luis Lobato, in 1997 she went north, venturing 200 miles inside the Arctic Circle and in 2000, 2009 and 2017 she sailed across the Atlantic to Bermuda, the USA and Canada. In 2019 she visited Iceland and the Faroe Islands for the first time.

In 2003 she was bought by Dauntsey's School outright.

The boat is currently skippered by Toby Marris, and has the capacity to carry up to 12 students for local and international cruising and racing trips.

== Specifications ==
- Sparred length: 22.50 m (73 ft 10 in)
- Length on deck: 17.06 m (56 ft)
- Load waterline length: 14.63 m (48 ft)
- Beam: 4.63 m (15 ft 2 in)
- Draught: 3.10 m (10 ft 2 in)
- Displacement: 44 tonnes
- Crew: Up to three
- Trainees: Up to twelve
- MCA MGN280 Operating Area: Category 0 – Unrestricted

== Fastnet Races ==
The Fastnet Race is a biennial offshore yacht race off the south coast of the United Kingdom, named after the Fastnet Rock, which the race course rounds. It is considered one of the classic offshore races.

Jolie Brise won the inaugural Fastnet Race (then called the Ocean Race) in 1925 in a time of 6 days, 14 hours and 45 minutes as part of a fleet of seven boats. At the post-race dinner at the Royal Western Yacht Club in Plymouth, the new Ocean Racing Club (later the Royal Ocean Racing Club) was formed and its first commodore appointed, Jolie Brise's owner Lt Cmdr Evelyn G Martin.

Jolie Brise won the Fastnet again in 1929 and 1930, again skippered by Martin. She is currently the only vessel to have won the race three times.

She also competed in the 2013 Fastnet Race on the centenary of her inaugural win, crewed by students from Dauntsey's School and the Ellen MacArthur Cancer Trust, finishing 277th in fleet of 294 boats with a time of 4 days, 19 hours, 11 minutes and 4 seconds.

== Blue Water Medals ==
The prestigious Blue Water Medal was inaugurated by the Cruising Club of America in 1923 to reward "meritorious seamanship and adventure upon the sea displayed by amateur sailors of all nationalities, that might otherwise go unrecognized".

Jolie Brise's two Blue Water Medals were both awarded for her conduct in the Bermuda Race.

The first, in 1926, was to Evelyn Martin for "Double trans-Atlantic crossing, including Bermuda Race. LeHavre pilot cutter 56 feet oa. April 3, 1926 from Falmouth, July 27 to Plymouth."

Her second was awarded in 1932 to Robert Somerset "Without Date" for "remarkable feat of seamanship and courage in rescuing all but one of 11-man crew of burning schooner Adriana in the 1932 Bermuda Race."

On the first night of the 1932 Bermuda Race, the schooner Adriana was sailing into brisk southwesterly winds when the heat from the coal stove in her cabin ignited some oilskins. The uncontrollable fire spread so rapidly that the decision was made to abandon ship.

Three miles ahead of Adriana was Jolie Brise, owned and sailed by Henry Robert Somers Fitzroy de Vere Somerset, known afloat as “Bobby.” His crew included Herbert L. Stone and the famous American racing helmsman Sherman Hoyt.

In a feat of seamanship, Somerset, at Jolie Brise’s long tiller, turned the engineless, heavy-displacement vessel around toward the burning Adriana, whose crew was struggling to launch a small boat and heave the spinnaker pole into the water to serve as an improvised float. As Adriana’s helmsman, Clarence Kozaly, held position, Somerset brought Jolie Brise alongside under sail. The yachts’ rails banged together, their upper rigging tangled, and Jolie Brise’s tarred deadeye lanyards were charred. Ten of Adriana’s crew of 11 jumped across to the cutter's deck.

Only the dutiful Kozaly was left at the helm of Adriana. The two yachts were several feet apart when he finally let go the wheel and made his leap, only to tumble into the gap. Sherman Hoyt desperately threw him a line, but Kozaly's heavy clothing drew him under. After helping to save 10 lives, he lost his own and is the only fatality in Bermuda Race history.

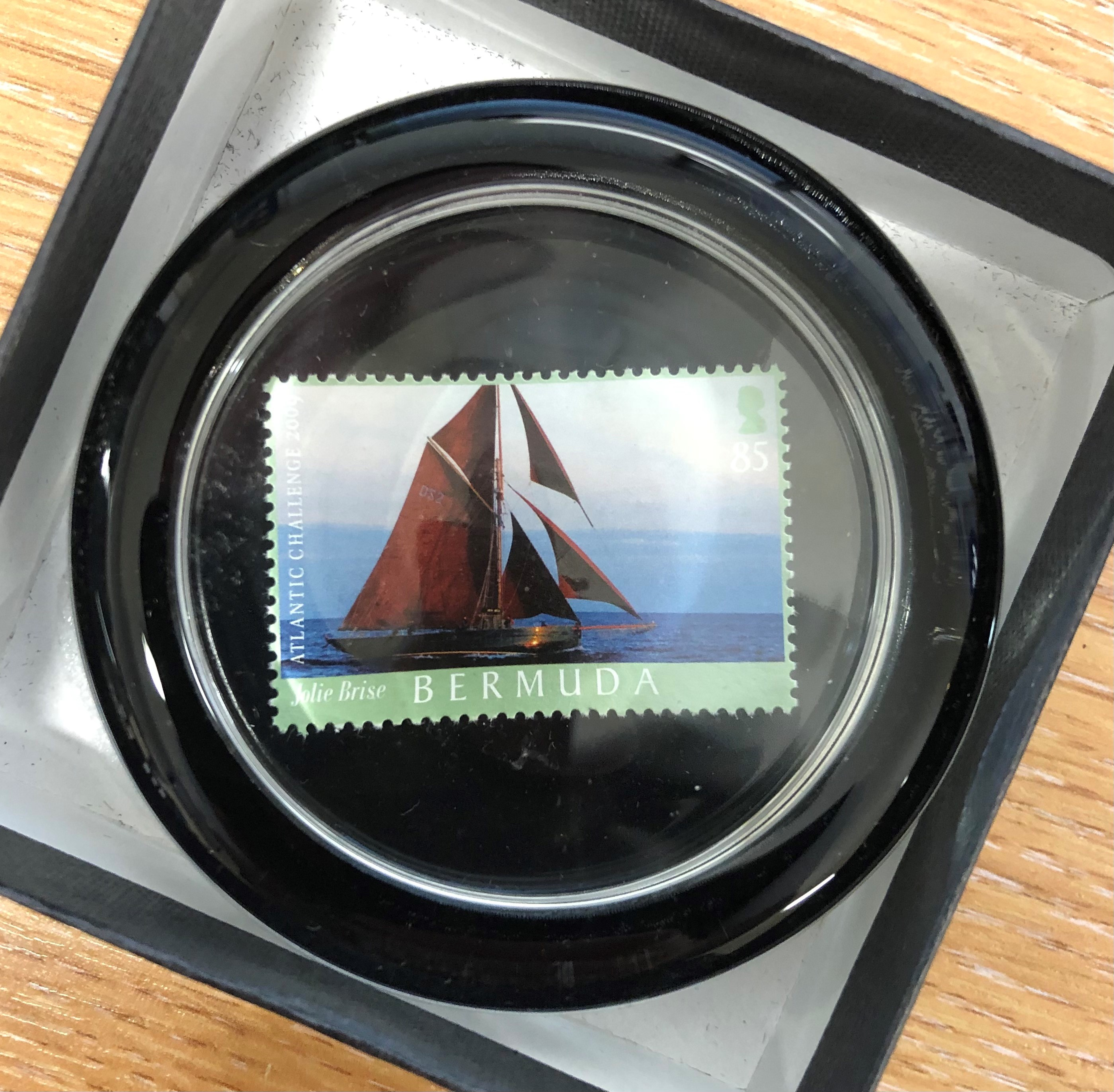
A paperweight containing a Bermudan stamp with a picture of Jolie Brise on it

== Bermuda Post Office stamps ==
A part of her participation in the Tall Ships Atlantic Challenge 2009, Jolie Brise sailed from Tenerife to Bermuda. To commemorate the event, the Bermuda Post Office Philatelic Department issued a set of stamps depicting six of the ships involved, including the Jolie Brise.

== Thames Diamond Jubilee Pageant ==
Jolie Brise was one of a number of prestigious vessels to be moored along the route of the Thames Diamond Jubilee Pageant, to celebrate the Diamond Jubilee of Elizabeth II on 3 June 2012. Due to her size, she was not part of the flotilla of vessels, and was instead moored with other vessels at St Katharine Docks.

== Jolie Brise Pub ==
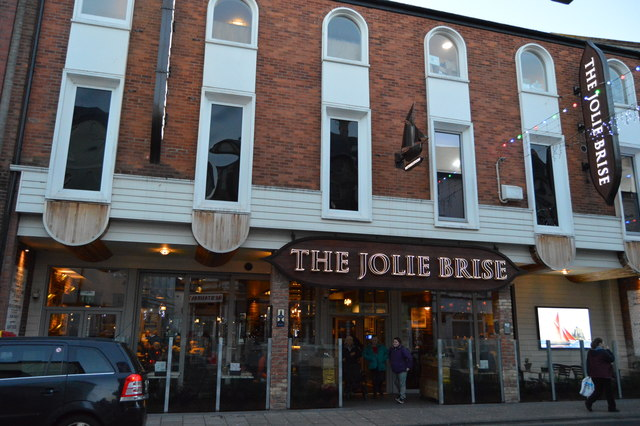
Photo of the front of the Jolie Brise pub in Teignmouth

In May 2018, Wetherspoons opened a pub in Teignmouth and named it The Jolie Brise after the boat which had been refitted in the town before her first Fastnet win in 1923. Jolie Brise visited the town for the opening of the pub.

== Chronology ==
1913: Built in Le Havre by Albert Paumelle
1923: New owner, E.G. Martin
1925: Winner of the first Fastnet Race
1926: 5th in the Bermuda race and awarded Blue Water Medal.
1926: Finished 3rd in Fastnet
1927: New owners, W Ferrier & WB Smith
1927: Retired from Fastnet after reaching The Lizard
1928: 2nd in the Fastnet Race
1928: New owner, H R S F de V Somerset
1929: Winner of the Fastnet Race
1929: Winner of the Queen of Spain's Cup (the first Santander)
1930: Winner of the Fastnet Race
1930: First across line in Santander but second to Ilex on corrected time
1931: Competed Fastnet
1932: Competed Bermuda - retired after rescuing crew, save one, of Adriana who abandoned because of fire
1932: New owner, J F B Gage
1934: New owner, S Mortimer
1938: New owner, W Stannard
1945: New owner, syndicate led by Lillian and Jim Worsdell
1946: New owner, L Lobato and partners (Vaz Pinto - principal owner)
1955: New owner, L Lobato - sole owner
1977: New owners, The International Sailing Craft Association in association with Dauntsey's School Sailing Club and the Science Museum
1980: Winner Tall Ships Race
1986: Winner Tall Ships Race Newcastle to Bremerhaven
1993: Refit complete - Jolie Brise's first Fastnet since 1931
1994: Circumnavigation of UK.
1999: Second in Tall Ships Race
2000: Overall winner of the Tall Ships 2000 Transatlantic Race
2002: Overall winner of the Tall Ships 2002 Transatlantic Race
2005: Participated in the Trafalgar 200 celebration
2008: First in Class and Fleet in Tall Ships Race Liverpool, UK to Maloy, Norway
2011: First in Class and Overall Winner of the Tall Ships Race 2011

2015: First in Class and Overall Winner of Tall Ships Race 2015
