= Bloodhound (yacht) =

Ocean racing yacht

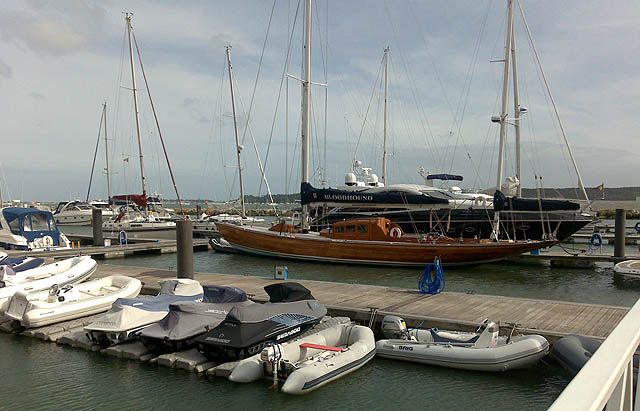
- Bloodhound moored at Dolphin Marina, Poole in 2009.

History

United Kingdom
- Owner: Ike Bell (1936–1939); Hans Hamilton and Patrick Egan (1939–1947); Myles Wyatt (1947–1962); Queen Elizabeth II and Prince Philip (1962–1969); Robert Cook (1969–2002); Richard Carr (2002–2003); Tony and Cindy McGrail (2003–2010); Royal Yacht Britannia Trust (since 2010)
- Builder: Camper and Nicholsons
- Yard number: 438
- Laid down: 1936
- Launched: 1936
- Identification: MMSI number: 235003227; Callsign: ZNWF7

General characteristics
- Class & type: Ocean racing yacht
- Tons burthen: 34 tons
- Length: 19.2 m (63 ft)
- Sail plan: Bermudan yawl

Bloodhound is a 19.2-metre (63 ft) ocean racing yacht. She was designed by Charles E. Nicholson and built by Camper and Nicholsons in 1936. From 1962 to 1969 she was owned by the British royal family and in January 2010 she was purchased by The Royal Yacht Britannia Trust.

== Royal ownership ==
In 1962 Bloodhound was purchased for the Royal Family at the request of Prince Philip. In February she was sailed from Plymouth to Gosport to be refitted by Camper and Nicholsons and the work was finished by June. Prince Philip sailed Bloodhound with Uffa Fox at Cowes Week in August of that year.

During royal ownership Bloodhound would accompany The Royal Yacht Britannia in the Western Isles when the royal family had their one true family holiday every year. She had a permanent crew of three, and one skipper was a descendant of Sir Francis Drake. It was during these times that the young royals learned to sail on Bloodhound. When not in royal use, Bloodhound and her crew were chartered to yacht clubs across the country at a daily fee of £1 (later increased to £2) per participant, used to expose thousands of people to offshore sailing.

In 1969 Bloodhound was sold by the royal family and Bloodhound then effectively retired from racing. Over time the boat gradually fell into considerable disrepair and very nearly became beyond salvage until in 2003 she was purchased by Tony and Cindy McGrail of Poole, a yacht surveyor and classic yacht restorer. At the time the vessel was in urgent need of restoration but it was felt that the amount of work involved might make such a project uneconomical. However, Tony and Cindy embarked on a four year reconstruction bringing BLOODHOUND back to pristine condition.

In January 2010 Bloodhound was purchased from Tony & Cindy by The Royal Yacht Britannia Trust and is now berthed alongside Britannia in Leith.

== Racing accomplishments ==
Racing accomplishments
Year	Event	Place
1936	Channel Race	1st
1936	Morgan Cup	1st
1937	Fastnet Race	3rd overall
1939	Benodet Race	2nd
1939	Channel Race	1st
1939	Fastnet Race	1st
1946	Royal London Yacht Club Regatta (at Cowes Week)	1st
1946	Royal Yacht Squadron Race (at Cowes Week)	1st
1947	Fastnet Race	2nd
1947	Southsea to Brixton Race	1st
1948	Morgan Cup	2nd
1948	Round the Island Race	1st
1948	Royal Yacht Squadron Race (at Cowes Week)	2nd
1949	Fastnet Race	1st
1949	Morgan Cup	1st (handicapped to 2nd)
1949	North Sea Race	1st
1949	Portsmouth to Poole Race	1st
1951	Channel Race	1st
1951	Fastnet Race	2nd
1951	Harwich to Hook Race	1st
1951	North Sea Race	1st
1951	Round the Island Race	3rd
1951	St Malo to Dinard Race	1st
1952	Bermuda Race	2nd overall
1953	Cowes to Dinard Race	1st
1953	Fastnet Race	1st (handicapped to 12th)
1957	Fastnet Race	5th overall
1958	Channel Race	1st
1959	Lyme Bay Race	1st
1965	Lyme Bay Race	1st

== Gallery ==
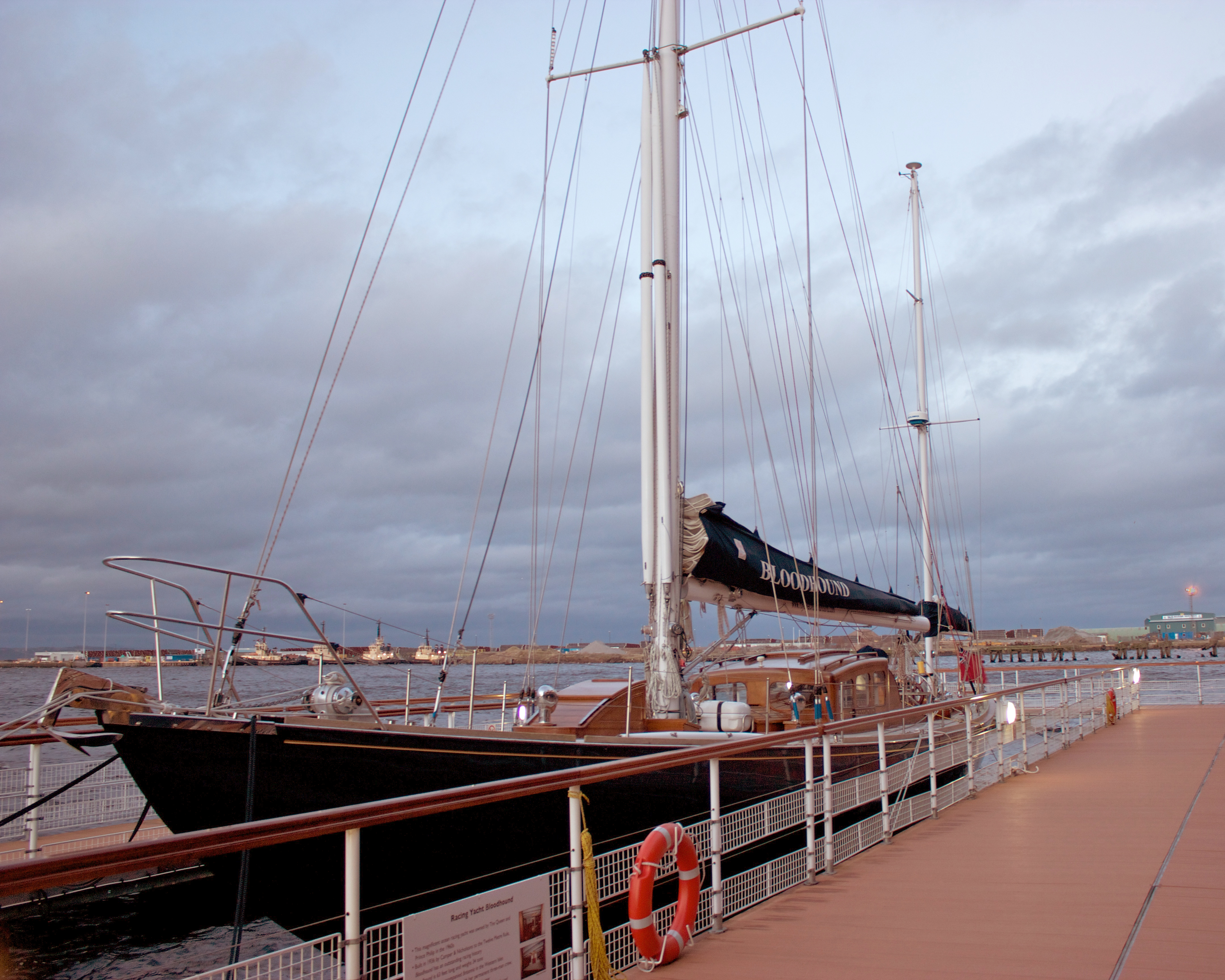
Bloodhound at Leith Docks in December 2011

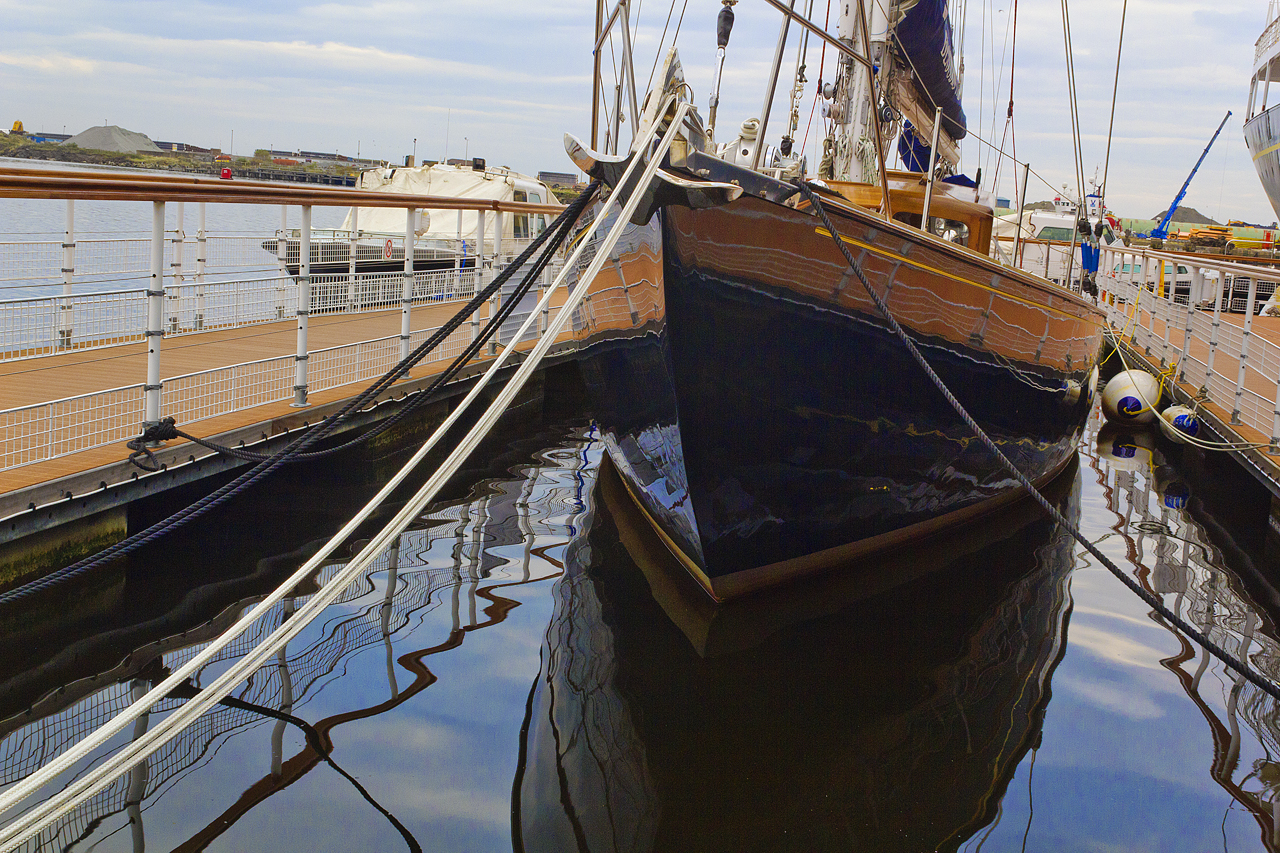
Bloodhound at Leith Docks in October 2011

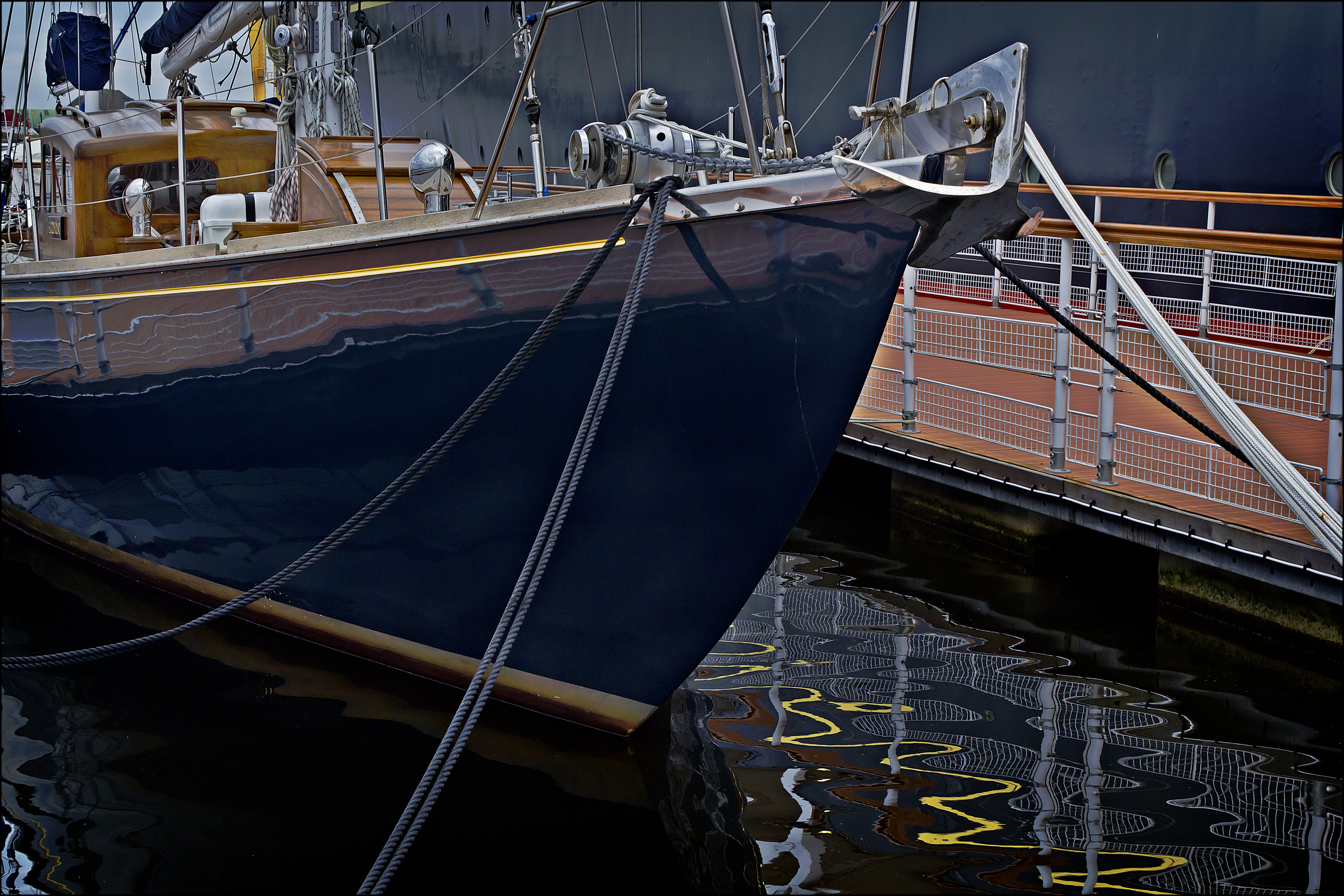
Bloodhound at Leith Docks in October 2011

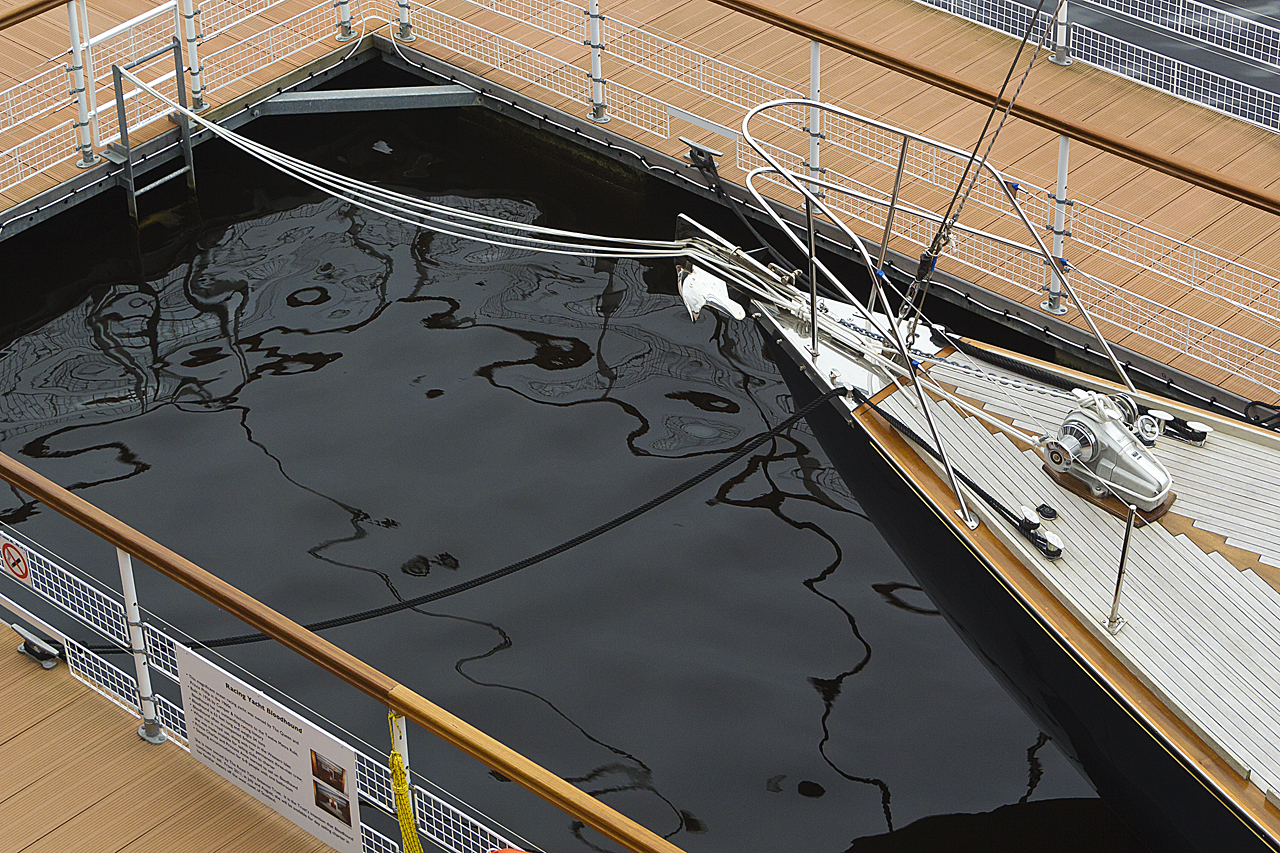
Bloodhound at Leith Docks in October 2011

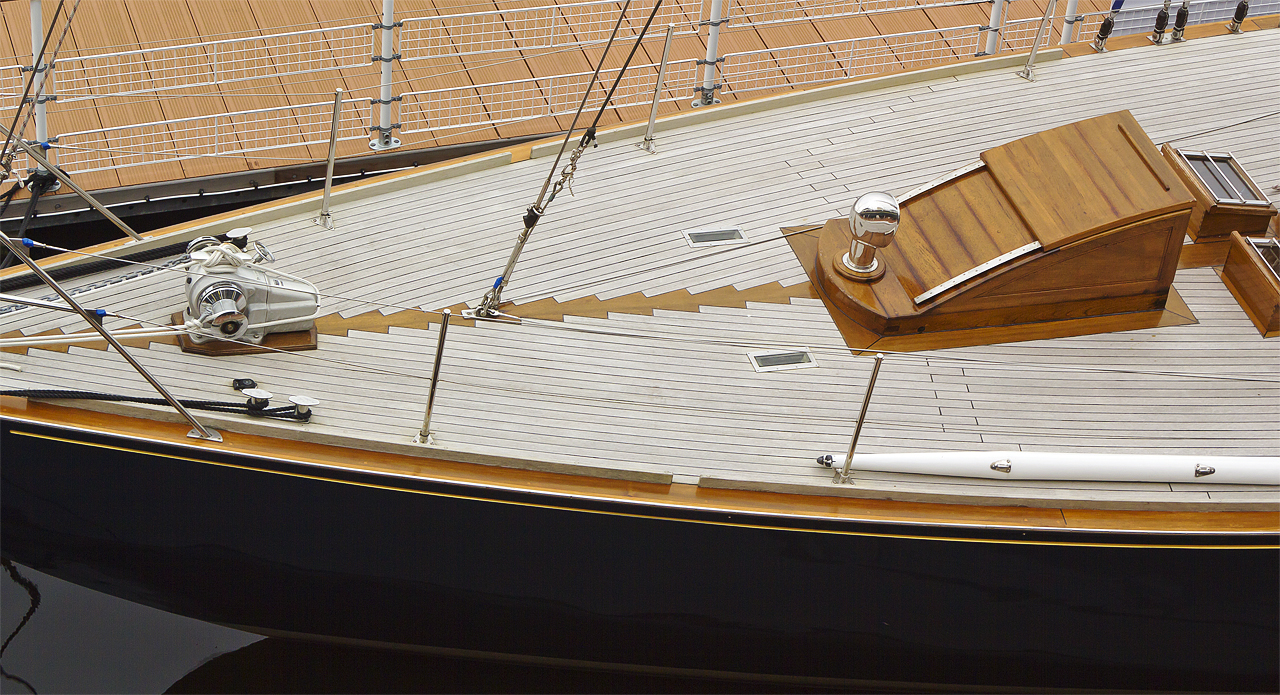
Bloodhound at Leith Docks in October 2011
