= Kees Bruynzeel =

Dutch businessman, timber merchant and yachtsman

Cornelis ("Kees") Bruynzeel Jr. (February 19, 1900 in Rotterdam – August 1. 1980 in Greece) was a Dutch businessman, timber merchant and yachtsman.

== Early years ==
Bruynzeel was the son of Cornelis Bruynzeel Sr., who founded a timber factory in 1897, and Antoinette Lels. He studied in The Hague, and took several trips to the United States and Sweden to study progress in automatization and wood manufacturing. In 1920 he became manager of the family's new door factory in Zaandam. In 1922 he married Titia Verkade, granddaughter of the industrialist Ericus Gerhardus Verkade.

Bruynzeel Jr. was an avid sailor. He won the Fastnet race for the Netherlands in 1937 with his Stephens-designed yawl Zeearend ("sea eagle", the eagle being the logo of the Bruynzeel company). The Dutch designer Piet Zwart worked closely with Bruynzeel's father and his brother Willem (he designed their first kitchens) and was involved with the design of the Zeearend as well.

== Industry Pioneer ==
In 1939, when the production had expanded to include floors and kitchens and the threat of World War II was causing a decline in the building industry, he considered alternatives and pioneered the development of new timber materials for the production of the Bruynzeel kitchen and for boat construction. Using a newly developed water-resistant synthetic resin glue, Bruynzeel developed a durable three-ply wood, similar to plywood, for the fabrication of external doors. Bruynzeel went on to extend the concept of the modular kitchen and with E.G. van de Stadt developed the first industrialised boat construction system in the world.

Today Bruynzeel Multipanel Int. B.V., as it was later renamed, is a leading timber company that specialises in marine and construction timber, with distribution throughout Europe, North America and the Caribbean, amongst others. The Bruynzeel name also lives on as a shelving brand of the Swedish Altor Equity Partners.

== South Africa ==
In 1956 Kees Bruynzeel Jr. moved to South Africa, where he owned and operated a company Bruply Doors, including a factory at Stellenbosch. Bruynzeel's South African timber operations now comprise PG Bison and are controlled by Steinhoff Africa.

In 1962, Bruynzeel built a house in Stellenbosch, that was controversial considering the conservative architecture of the time. The roof of the house is shaped like a hyperbolic paraboloid, and is constructed using teak rafters and lined with yellowwood. It was designed by architect Aart Bijl.

== Sailing ==
Bruynzeel continued sailing and winning races. In the 1937 Fastnet Race "Zeearend" was winner overall. In the Fastnet 1951 Race, "Zeevalk" wasklasse winner and 2. overall. "Stormvogel" was first to finish in the 1961 Fastnet, the 1962 Buenos Aires-Rio race, the 1964 Burmuda race, the 1965 Sydney to Hobart Yacht Race, the 1966 China Sea Race, and the 1967 Trans-Pacific Race (Los Angeles-to-Hawaii Transpac race with the boat Stormvogel ("Stormbird" or the Shearwater), after coming in a close second in 1965. In 1973, aged 72, Bruynzeel took both line and overall handicap honours in the Cape to Rio Yacht Race in his boat Stormy; his progress was followed with keen interest, since he had suffered three heart attacks in the previous year.
