= Ellen MacArthur Cancer Trust =

- Company type: Registered Charity
- Industry: Charity
- Founded: 2003
- Key people: Ellen MacArthur (Patron); Frank Fletcher (CEO); Richard Butcher (Chair of Trustees); Laura Davis (Operations Manager)
- Website: Official website

The Ellen MacArthur Cancer Trust is a registered charity that supports young people aged 8–24 to rebuild their confidence after cancer.

Many individuals recovering from cancer still experience apathy and difficulty returning to typical life. The charity attempts to rebuild young people's confidence in themselves through sailing trips. This is done to rectify the immense impact of cancer on independence, education, employment, emotional wellbeing and a young person's relationships with friends and family.

The charity has bases in Cowes on the Isle of Wight and Largs on Scotland's West Coast. The organisation receives no government support and all the activities it offers are free.

== History ==
In 2000 Dame Ellen MacArthur DBE sailed with A Chacun Son Cap, a French charity for children with cancer and leukaemia. Inspired by the incredible impact sailing had on helping those children rediscover themselves in the confusing aftermath of cancer, and by their courage, spirit and humour, Ellen launched the 'Ellen MacArthur Trust' for young people aged 8–18 in Cowes in 2003.

The inaugural Trust trip sailed out of Cowes on 20 July 2003, with five young people from Great Ormond Street Hospital. The following week a group from Southampton General Hospital sailed too.

In 2005, the Trust was named an official charity of the Round the Island Race and first Trust crew took part in the iconic race. This was significant as it was the first time that young people, who had previously sailed with the Trust in recovery from cancer, were invited back.

Young people being able to return year-on-year would become a core element of the Trust providing long-term support, not just one-off trip experiences, and in 2007, Essex Outdoors Bradwell hosted the Trust's first residential adventure activities trip as part of what became known as the 'Return to Sail' programme.

A name change to the 'Ellen MacArthur Cancer Trust' followed in 2010, the same year that the charity started to support young people aged 18–24 for the first time. This was important because young people in this older age group face different challenges to children after treatment.

With the Trust now working with every young person's principal treatment centre in the UK, a second base in Largs was opened in 2013, thanks to the support of players of People's Postcode Lottery. By 2019, no fewer than 2,400 young people from across England, Scotland, Wales and Northern Ireland had been supported in rebuilding their confidence after cancer.
