= Dick Nye =

American sailor

Richard (Dick) S. Nye in an American sailor. He won the Frostbite Regatta three years in a row in 1957, 1958 and 1959. He has won two Fastnet races, two Transatlantic races and three Bermuda Races (two overall wins, one class win).
