= Nirvana (yacht) =

Maxi racing yacht launched in 1982

Nirvana (sail number USA 32323) is an 81-foot (24.7 m) maxi racing yacht designed by naval architect David Pedrick and built by Palmer Johnson. Launched in 1982 for owner Marvin Green, she was designed to combine competitive offshore racing performance with comfortable cruising accommodation. She competed in major international offshore yacht races and established course records in the Newport–Bermuda Race, China Sea Race and Fastnet Race.

The yacht's history was revisited in a 2022 feature in Scuttlebutt Sailing News titled Nirvana: Fastest, prettiest in the world. Michael Keyworth recalled Marvin Green's ambition to create the "fastest, prettiest boat in the world".

Nirvana (USA 32323), the 81-foot maxi racing yacht designed by David Pedrick and launched in 1982. Photograph: Nirvana Photography Archive.

== Design and construction ==
Nirvana was designed by David Pedrick and built by Palmer Johnson in 1982. Commissioned by Marvin Green, the yacht was intended to compete in the International Offshore Rule (IOR) Maxi class while retaining the comfort and facilities of a cruising yacht.

Her design combined a racing hull with a substantial cruising interior. The yacht featured teak decks and accommodation with domestic facilities, including a clothes washer and a carved wooden bathtub. The interior could also be reconfigured for racing, with the large dining table removed and forward crew accommodation adapted to suit the yacht's racing programme. This combination of offshore racing capability and cruising comfort formed part of her original concept.

The stern and teak deck of Nirvana (USA 32323). Photograph: Nirvana Photography Archive.

== Racing history ==
=== 1982: Launch and Newport–Bermuda Race ===
Nirvana was launched in 1982 and competed in the Newport–Bermuda Race under Marvin Green's command. She established a course record with an elapsed time of 2 days, 14 hours, 29 minutes and 16 seconds. The record stood for 14 years.

The historical chronology also records that she competed in the Mediterranean Championship in the Balearic Islands in 1982, finishing first among four maxi yachts. In 1982, Nirvana won the Harvey Conover Memorial Trophy in the Block Island Race. The Storm Trysail Club's historical records list Marvin Green as the yacht's owner.

=== 1983: International maxi-yacht circuit ===
In 1983, Nirvana competed in the Southern Ocean Racing Conference (SORC) in Florida. A contemporary report described Marvin Green's new 81-foot aluminium-hulled yacht and its onboard facilities.

Her 1983 racing campaign included the Block Island Race, where she took line honours, the King Olav V Maxi Series in Norway, which she won, and the Copa del Rey in Palma, where she also finished first. She placed third in the Sardinia Maxi World Championship.

In December 1983, Nirvana competed in the Sydney–Hobart Yacht Race. She crossed the finish line first on line honours but was subsequently disqualified for failing to give Condor enough shore room during a gybing duel up the Derwent River towards the finish.

=== 1984: China Sea Race and Pacific racing ===
In April 1984, Nirvana competed in the China Sea Race, taking line honours and completing the course in 79 hours, 23 minutes and 13 seconds to establish a new course record.

She subsequently sailed to Hawaii for the 1984 Clipper Cup, where she finished fourth in Class A. She then competed in the San Francisco Big Boat Series in September 1984.

=== 1985: Fastnet Race ===
In August 1985, Nirvana won line honours in the Fastnet Race, setting a new course record of 2 days, 12 hours and 34 minutes. She finished 31 seconds ahead of Privateer.

=== 1987 and 1989: European racing ===
In 1987, Nirvana established a new course record in the Gotland Runt and competed in the Fastnet Race. She also took part in the 1989 Fastnet Race, where photographs from the start identify her among the competing yachts. The Gotland Runt awards the Nirvana Trophy to the monohull with the shortest sailing time around the course.

=== Later ownership and Newport–Bermuda racing ===
Following Marvin Green's ownership, Nirvana passed to Charles F. Kiefer III and became associated with Marblehead, Massachusetts. She competed in the Newport–Bermuda Race in 2002, finishing tenth in Class 8, and again in 2006, finishing third in Class 9.

In the 2008 Newport–Bermuda Race, Nirvana sailed under Charles Kiefer and finished eighth in Class 9, with an elapsed time of 92 hours, 0 minutes and 54 seconds.

In the 2010 Newport–Bermuda Race, Nirvana finished eighth in Class 13, with an elapsed time of 81 hours, 36 minutes and 45 seconds. She was sailed by Charles F. Kiefer III.

Nirvana competing in the 2010 Newport–Bermuda Race. Photograph: Nirvana Photography Archive.

== 2017 restoration ==
Nirvana (USA 32323) hauled out during restoration work in 2017. Photograph: Nirvana Photography Archive.

In 2017, Nirvana underwent a major restoration following the death of her previous owner. Photographs published in a discussion on the Sailing Anarchy forum that year show the yacht hauled out during the work, with sections of her hull prepared for restoration. The discussion described the yacht as a fine-looking maxi that had been a leading member of the Marblehead fleet and expressed hope that she would return to racing under new ownership.

== Later sailing and Mediterranean period ==
Following her restoration, Nirvana continued her sailing career and became based in the Mediterranean. Her later history has included sailing and visits to different locations throughout the region.

Photographs document the yacht in Mykonos and at anchor off Schinoussa, Greece, showing her continued presence in Mediterranean waters more than four decades after her launch.

Nirvana in Mykonos, Greece. Photograph: Nirvana Photography Archive.

Nirvana at anchor off Schinoussa, Greece. Photograph: Nirvana Photography Archive.

== RORC and RYC associations ==
Nirvana is associated with the Royal Ocean Racing Club (RORC) and Rosey Yacht Club (RYC). She flies the RORC burgee and the RYC burgee.

== Media appearances ==
Nirvana appeared in a Mars Bar television commercial filmed in 1989.
