= Evelyn Martin (cricketer) =

English cricketer

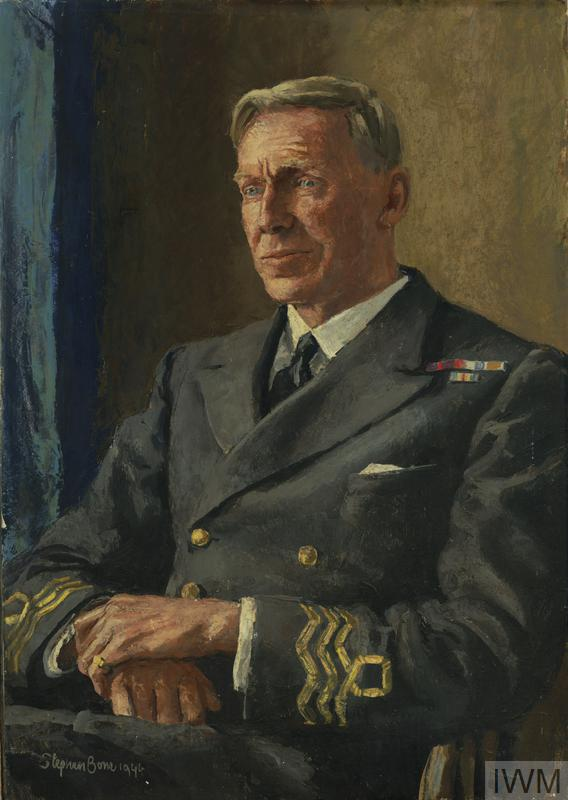

Personal information
- Full name: Evelyn George Martin
- Born: 22 March 1881; Upton-on-Severn, Worcestershire, England
- Died: 27 April 1945 (aged 64); Hadleigh, Suffolk, England
- Batting: Right-handed
- Bowling: Right-arm fast

Domestic team information
- Years: Team
- 1903–1906: Oxford University
- 1903–1907: Worcestershire

Career statistics
Competition	FC
Matches	29
Runs scored	519
Batting average	12.65
100s/50s	0/1
Top score	56
Balls bowled	5,750
Wickets	107
Bowling average	23.51
5 wickets in innings	5
10 wickets in match	0
Best bowling	7/81
Catches/stumpings	10/0
- Source: CricketArchive, 8 March 2009

Commander Evelyn George Martin OBE (22 March 1881 – 27 April 1945) was a British sailor, writer and cricketer. He was educated at Eton and New College, Oxford, where he was awarded a cricket Blue, and served in the Royal Naval Volunteer Reserve during the First World War. He was born in Upton-on-Severn, Worcestershire.

== Sailing ==
A 6 ft 7 in (2.01 m) tall bachelor of independent means with family connections to Martin's bank (merged with Barclays Bank in 1969), his interest in working boats under sail was kindled by his trips on Brixham trawlers. In 1923 he purchased the French pilot cutter Jolie Brise and sailed her to victory in the first Fastnet Race of 1925. He was the founder and first Commodore of the Ocean Racing Club (RORC), and later Admiral until he died.

After selling Jolie Brise he worked Thames barge on England's east coast.

Martin wrote many articles for Yachting World and three books: Deep Water Cruising (1928); Sailorman (1933); Helmsmanship (1934).

Martin died from heart failure in Hadleigh, Suffolk at the age of 64. He is buried in Friars Road Cemetery in the town.

== Cricket ==
Most of Martin's first-class appearances came for Oxford University, but he also played three games for Worcestershire and one for H. D. G. Leveson-Gower's XI.

Martin played a number of times for Eton, and in 1899 he took ten wickets in the match against Harrow at Lord's. His first-class debut came in May 1903, for Oxford against Gentlemen of England at The Parks; he claimed five wickets in the match including that of centurion Bernard Bosanquet. In a total of ten first-class games that season he took 37 wickets at 19.18, including two for his first and only County Championship match, for Worcestershire against Somerset. (He went wicketless against the Gentlemen of Philadelphia on his other appearance for the county that year.)

In the next two seasons he played 15 first-class games, all for Oxford, and picked up 29 and 32 wickets respectively. This period included his best innings return: 7/81 against Kent at Oxford's Christ Church ground in late May 1905. He appeared twice more in 1906, scoring his only first-class half-century in hitting 56 from number 11 in the University Match at Lord's (adding 90 for the last wicket with Wilfred Curwen), and in 1907 played two final matches, both against Oxford: once for Worcestershire, and once for H. D. G. Leveson-Gower's XI.
