= ICAP Leopard 3 (yacht) =

ICAP Leopard 3 is a 30-metre IRC maxi yacht owned and skippered by Helical Bar plc CEO Michael Slade, who has owned maxi yachts for over 22 years. She features a canting keel, water ballast and twin daggerboards amidships.

ICAP Leopard 3 holds several records for powered sailing monohulls (WSSRC rule 21c), including the transatlantic passage from Ambrose Light to Lizard Point in 2008 and Round the Island Race in 2013 (all surpassed by records for manual power monohulls set by other vessels in compliance with WSSRC rule 21b). She won line honours in the Middle Sea Race in 2009 and the Fastnet race in 2009 and 2011.

The yacht's homeport is Southampton, and she is available for charter for races, cruises and corporate events, mainly in the English Channel.

== Technical specifications ==
- Year of launch: 2007
- Yacht designer: Farr Yacht Design
- Builder: McConaghy Boats, Australia
- Port of registry: London, UK
- Length overall: 30.00 m
- Load waterline length: 29.75 m
- Beam: 6.80 m
- Draught: 5.50 m
- Displacement: 42 T
- Hull construction: aramid foam core/prepreg carbonfiber sandwich
- Spars: carbonfiber by Southern Spars
- Ballast: 45° canting bulb with Central Coast Hydraulics ram and 6,000 L aft water ballast tank
- Sailmaker: Doyle Sails inventory
- Upwind sail area: 843 m^{2}
- Downwind sail area: 1,604 m^{2}
- Propulsion: 230 hp Yanmar engine
