= Round the Island Race =

Annual sailing race around Isle of Wight, United Kingdom

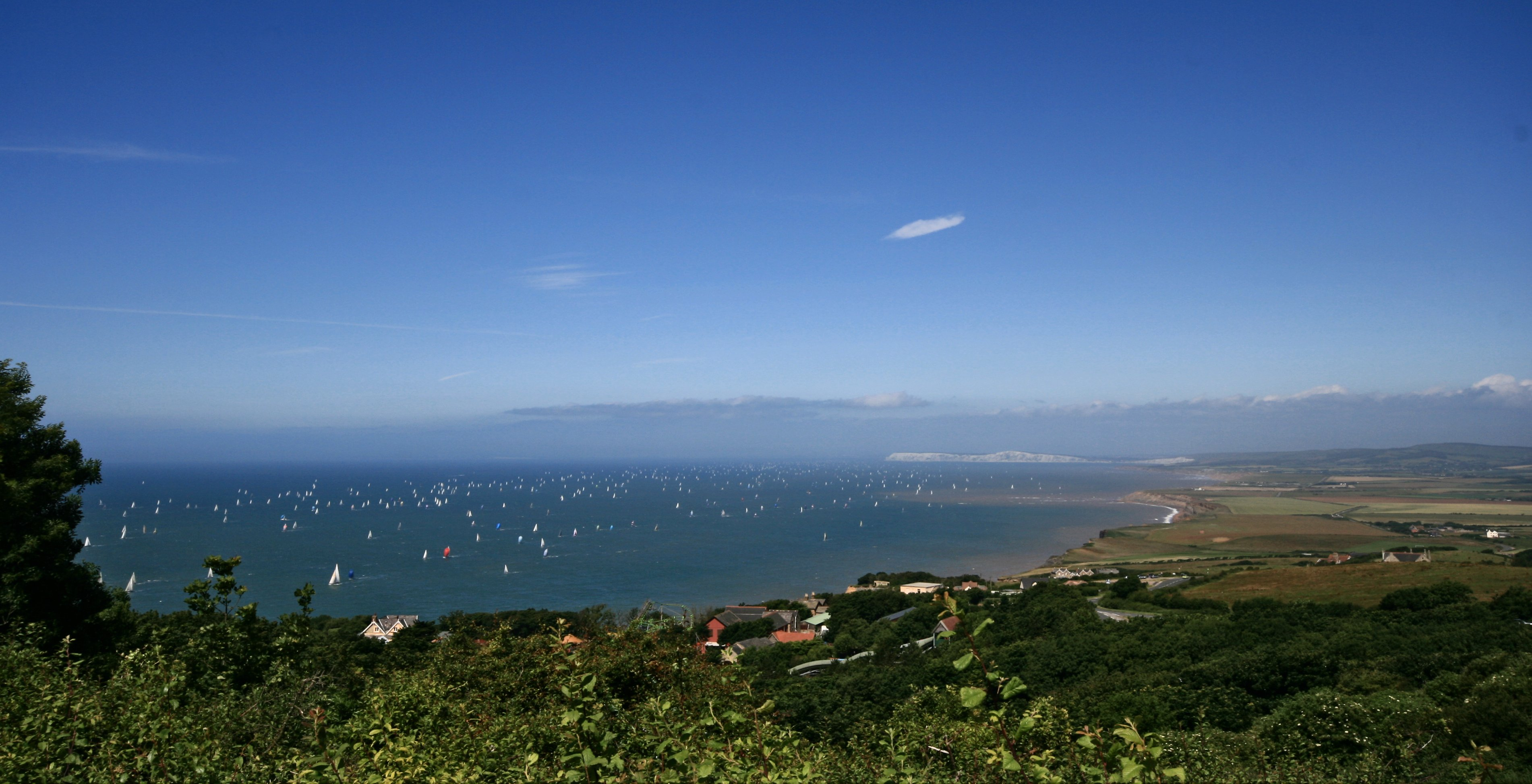
The Round the Island Race 2008, seen from the viewpoint at Blackgang, viewed north-west towards the Needles.

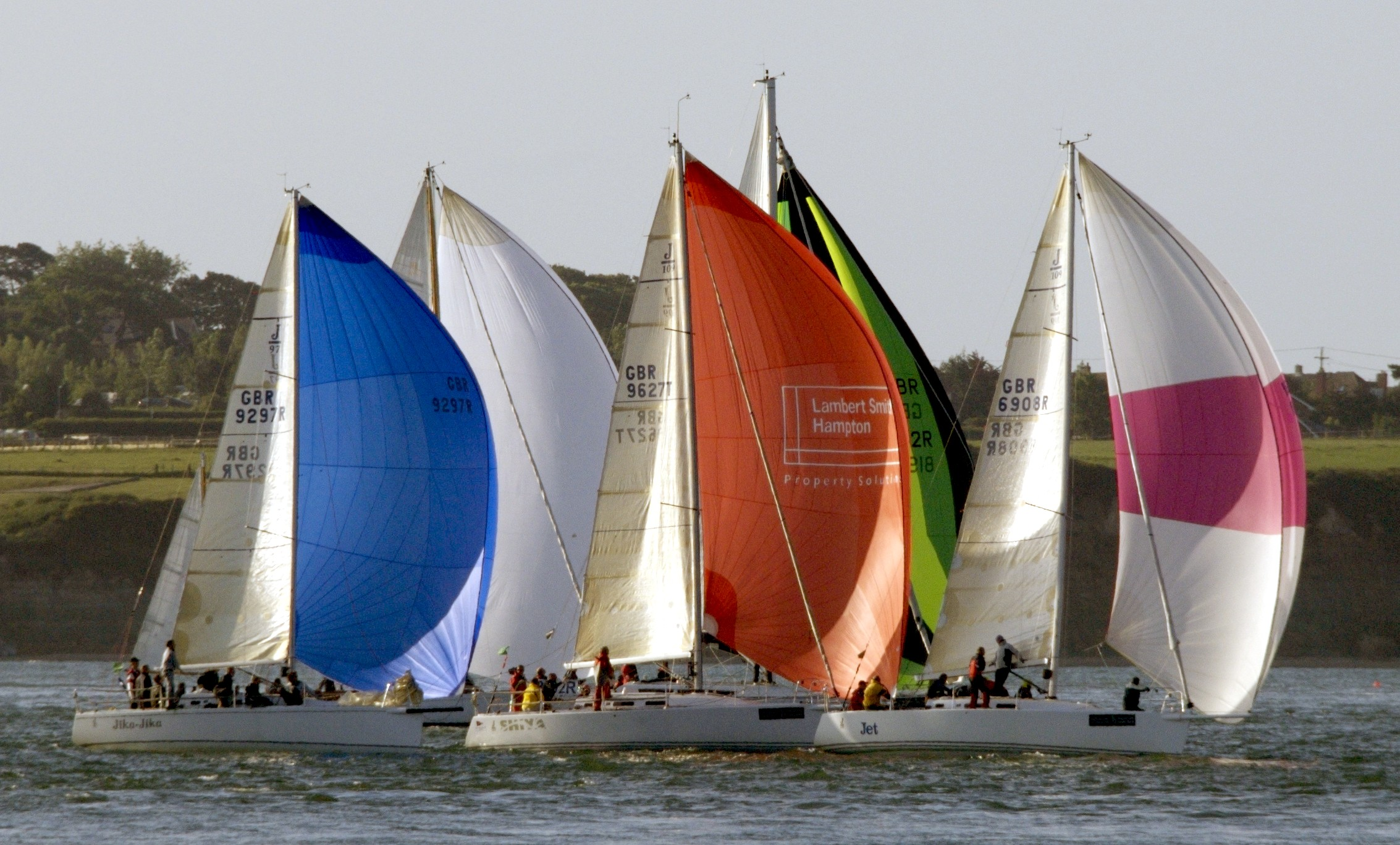
Yachts participating in the 2010 event

The Round the Island Race is an annual yacht race around the Isle of Wight. It starts and finishes in Cowes, and is organised by the Island Sailing Club. The course is about 50 nautical miles (93 km) long. It was first held in 1931, it was sponsored by JP Morgan Asset Management from 2005 but in 2017 Cloudy Bay took over as the Presenting Sponsor, the 2019 race was sponsored by Helly Hansen, Raymarine, MS Amlin and Chelsea Magazines. The race is generally chosen to be the Saturday in June with the most favourable tides; a date in late May or early July may be chosen if there is no suitable date in June.

== History ==
The race was the idea of Major Cyril Windeler, who commissioned a gold Roman-style bowl as prize for the winner. The first race, in 1931, had 25 entries. The silver bowl second prize was introduced a few years later when Chris Ratsey impressed Windeler with his good sportsmanship. The last race before World War II, in 1939, attracted 80 entries. In 2008 a total of 1750 boats took part. In 2022, more than 1100 boats took part.

== Course ==
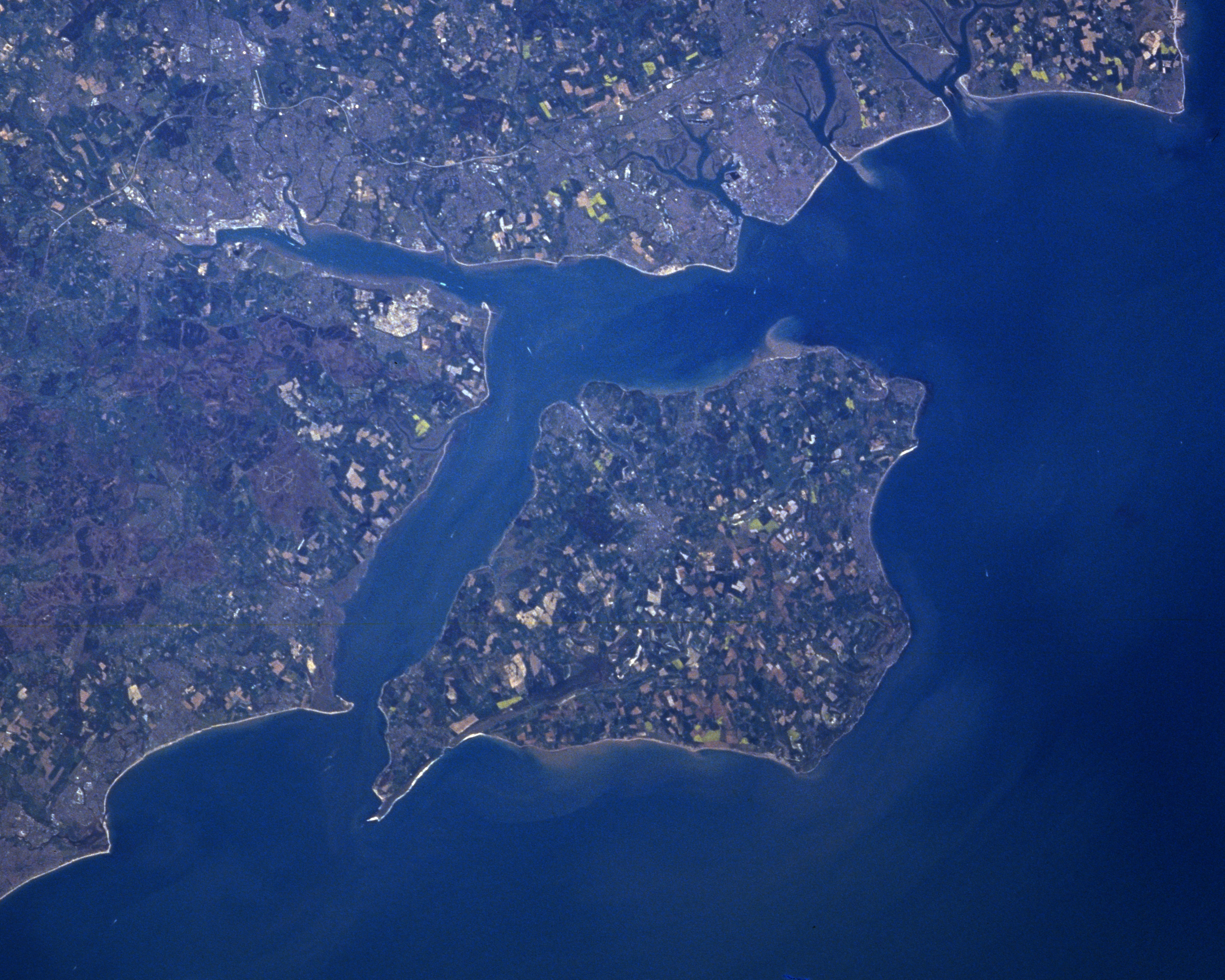
The course runs all the way round the Isle of Wight.

The course runs all the way around the Isle of Wight, with a total distance of 50.1 nmi (92.8 km).

The course has varied slightly with buoys tried at the Needles and a requirement to leave No Man's Land Fort to port.

== Race record ==
=== Multihull/outright race record ===
It was in 1961 that multihulls first entered the round the island race and the record has since fallen considerably.

Year	Time	Boat type	Boat name	Crew	Ref
2017	2 h 22 m 23 s	MOD 70	Concise 10	Ned Collier-Wakefield	T Lawson
2016	2 h 23 m 23 s	MOD 70	Phaedo^3	Lloyd Thornburg	
2013	2 h 52 m 15 s	AC45 catamaran	J.P.Morgan BAR	Ben Ainslie, helm/skipper	
2001	3 h 08 m	60 ft trimaran	Dexia Eure et Loire	Francis Joyon, skipper Rodney Pattison, navigator	
1986	3 h 05 m	60 ft trimaran	Paragon	Mike Whipp; Rodney Pattison	
1985	4 h 04 m	Nigel Irens 60 ft trimaran	Apricot	Tony Bullimore	
1963	5 h 50 m	Catamaran	Snowgoose of Wight	Don Robertson	
1961	6 h 00 m	Catamaran	Snowgoose of Wight	Don Robertson	
1932–1960	Various	Monohulls			
1931	9 h 51 m	Monohull		Thomas White Ratsey	

=== Monohull race record ===
Year	Time	Boat type	Boat name	Crew	Ref
2013	3 h 43 m 50 s	100 ft Farr design canting keel	ICAP Leopard	Mike Slade	
2008	3 h 53 m	100 ft Farr design canting keel	ICAP Leopard	Mike Slade	
2001	4 h 5 m 40 s	Reichel Pugh 92 ft maxi	Skandia Life Leopard	Mike Slade	
1931	9 h 51 m			Thomas White Ratsey	

=== Outright record ===
The outright record as recognised by the World Speed Sailing Record Council on behalf of International Sailing Federation has in the past also been the race record.

Year	Time	Boat type	Boat name	Crew	Notes and ref
June 2017	1 h 17 m 17 s	Catamaran	Red Jet 6	Howard Ray Casey Sheargold Ben Candy	Motorised vessel - not sailing
July 2023	1 h 56 m	Monohull		Oliver Pendleton Simon Schofield	Fully electric record attempt
August 2012	2 h 21 m 25 s	MOD 70	Foncia	Michel Desjoyeaux	Set during Cowes Week
November 2001	2 h 33 m 55 s	Catamaran	PlayStation	Steve Fossett, skipper Stan Honey, navigator	Standalone record attempt
June 2001	3 h 08 m	60 ft trimaran	Dexia Eure et Loire	Francis Joyon, skipper Rodney Pattison, navigator	Set during round the island race
1994	3 h 35 m	Trimaran	Lakota	Steve Fossett, skipper	Set during round the island race

== Gallery ==
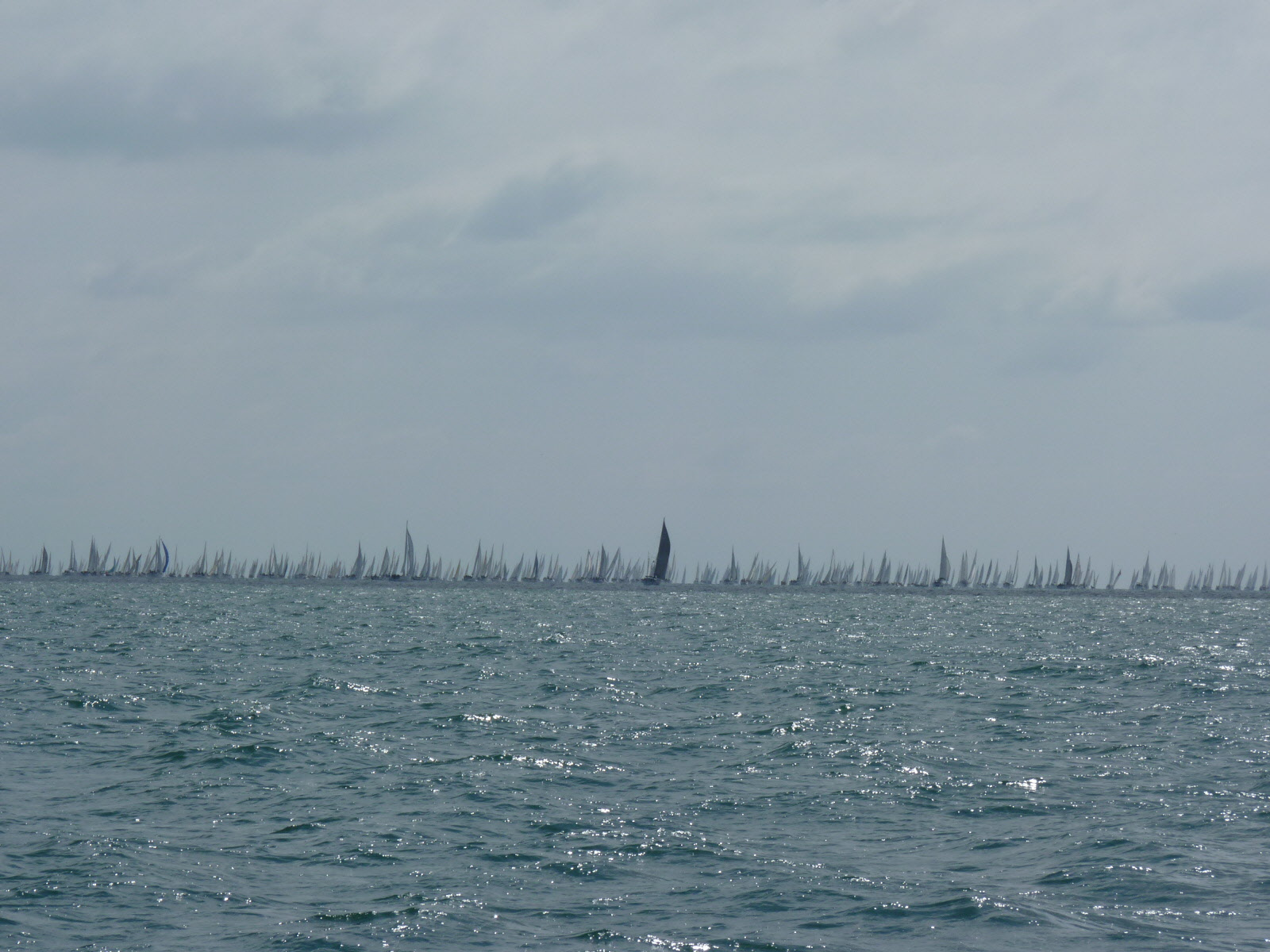
Some of the 1700 boats in the 2010 Round the Island Race.

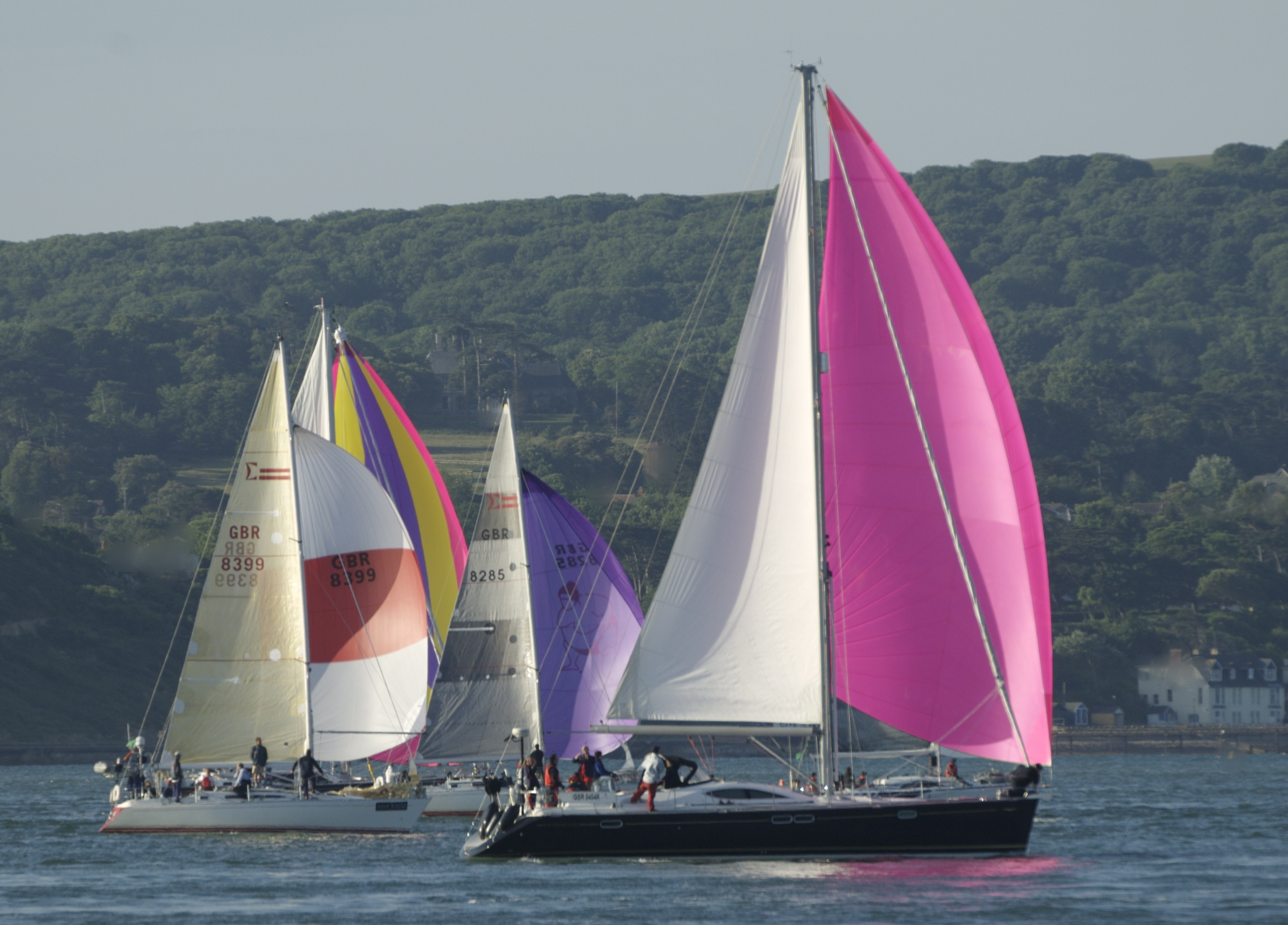
Yachts flying spinnakers during the 2010 race

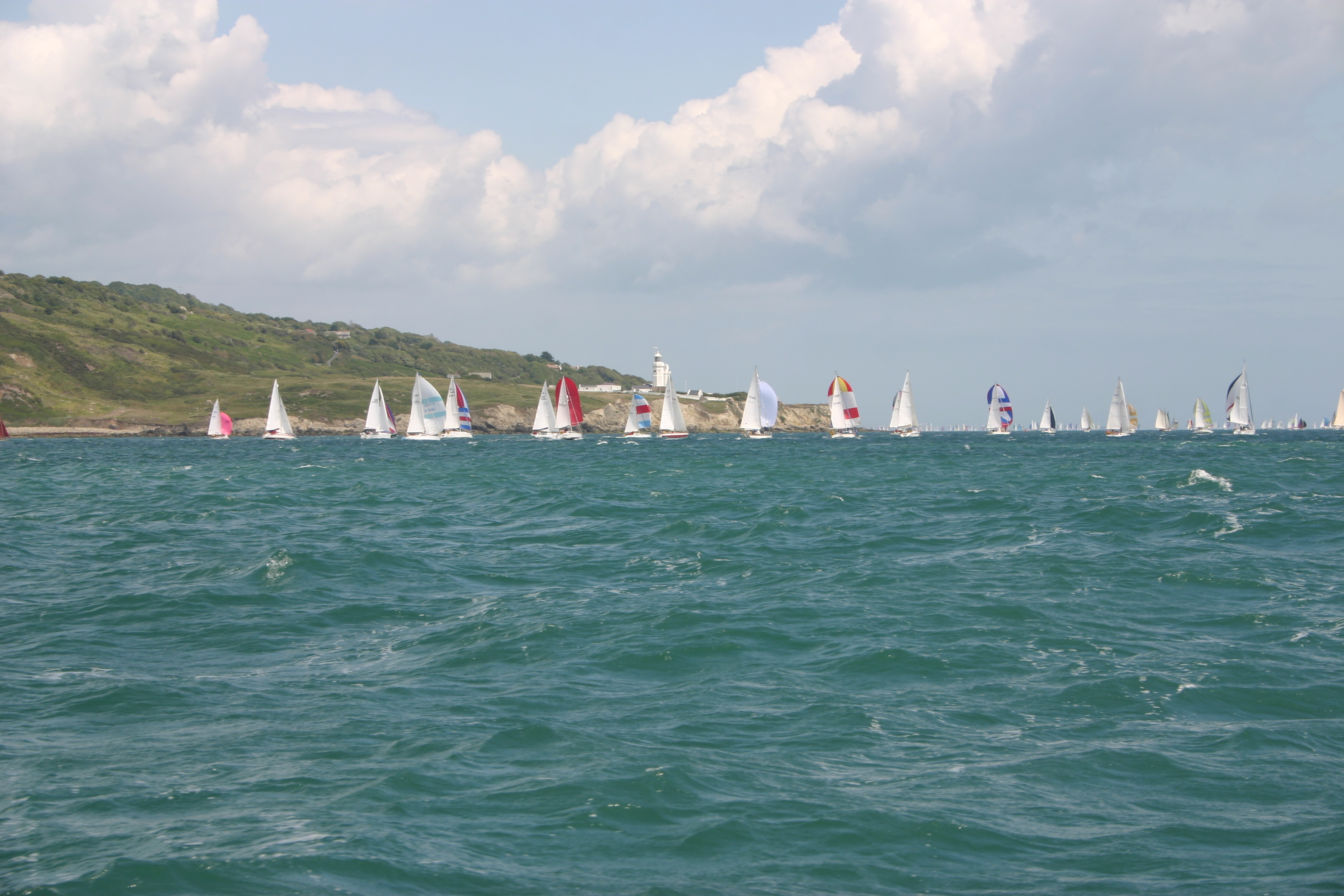
The fleet rounding St. Catherine's Lighthouse in 2009

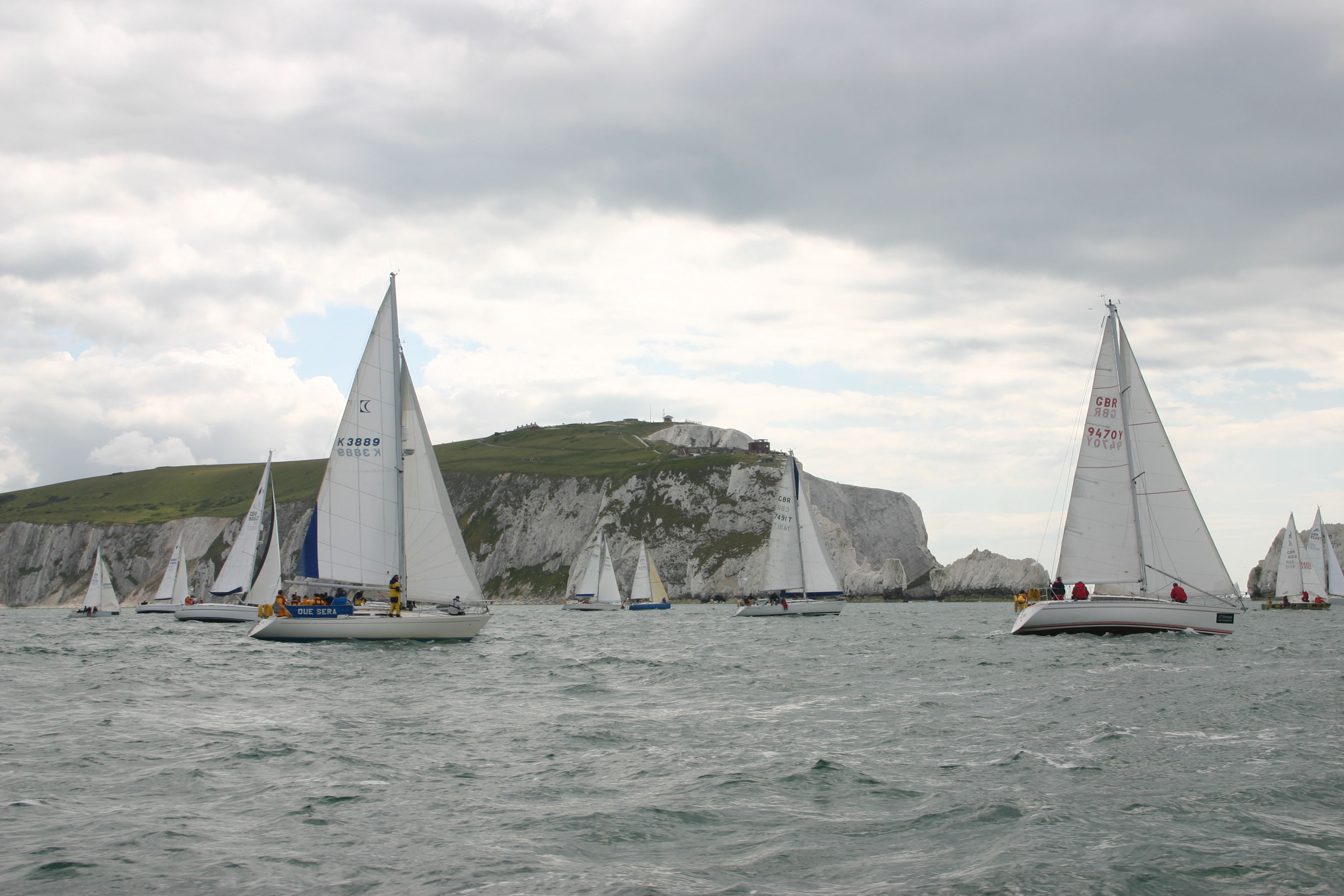
The 2009 race, with yachts seen racing off The Needles

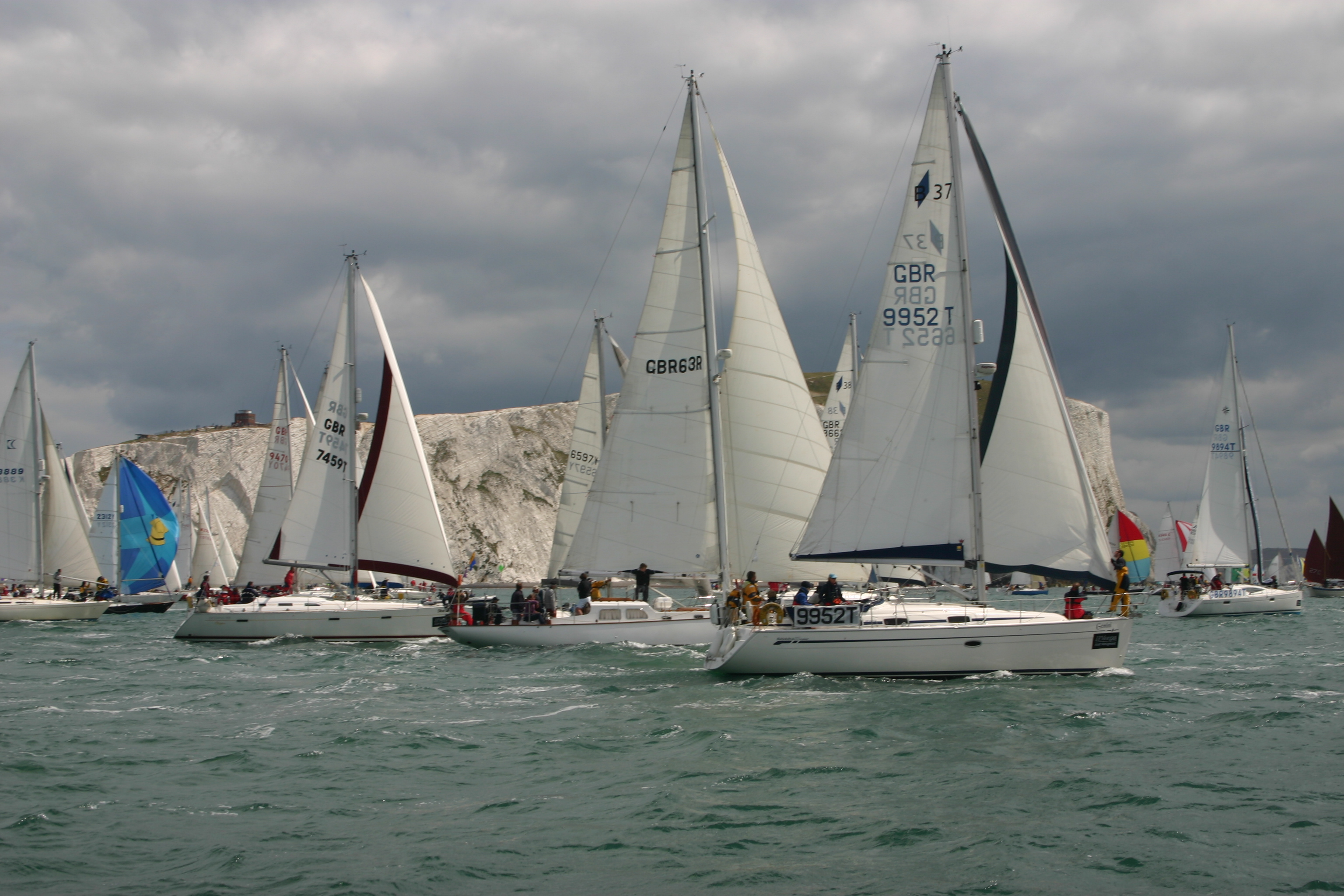
The 2009 race, with yachts seen racing off The Needles

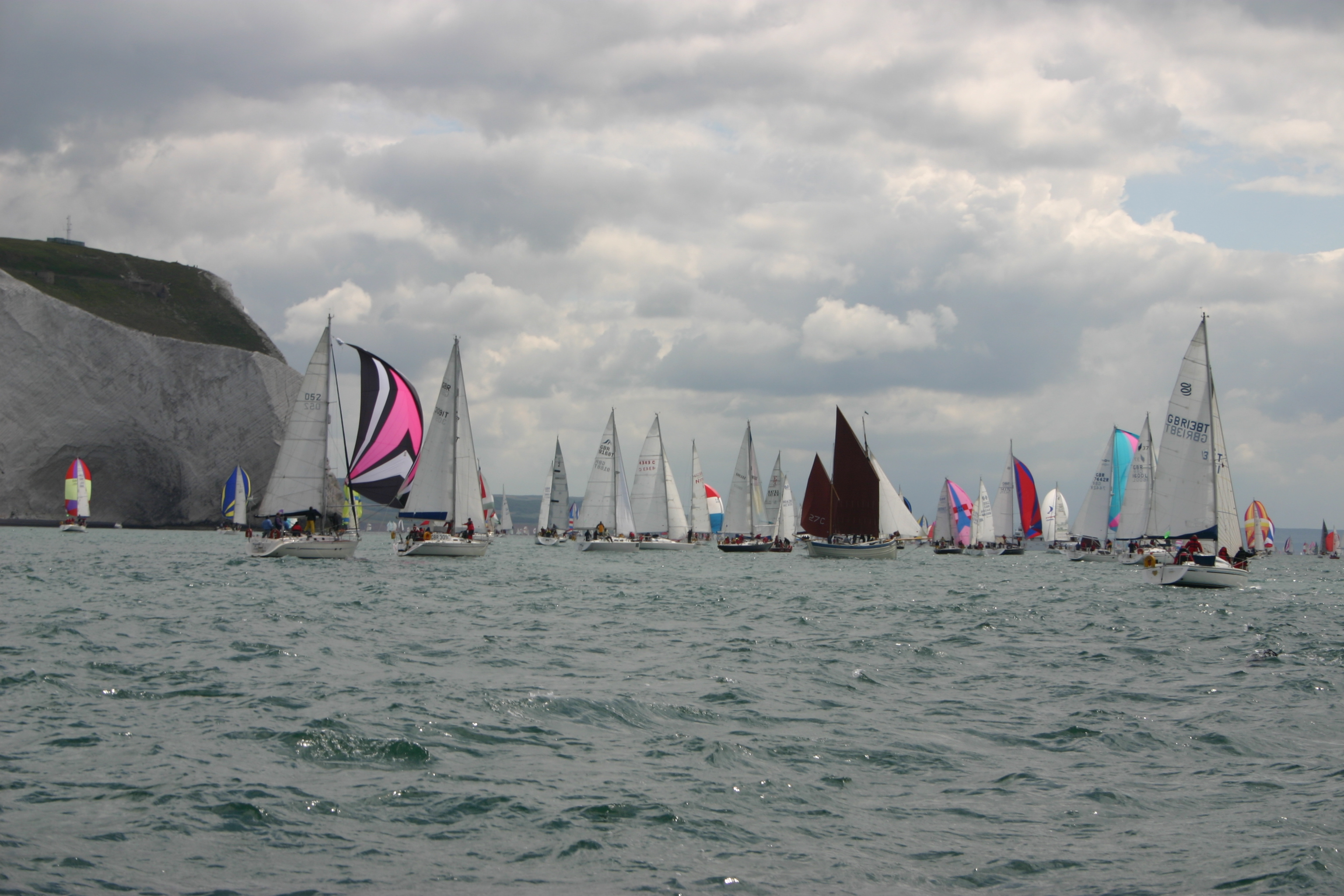
The 2009 race, with yachts seen racing off The Needles
