= Swan 36 =

Sailboat design

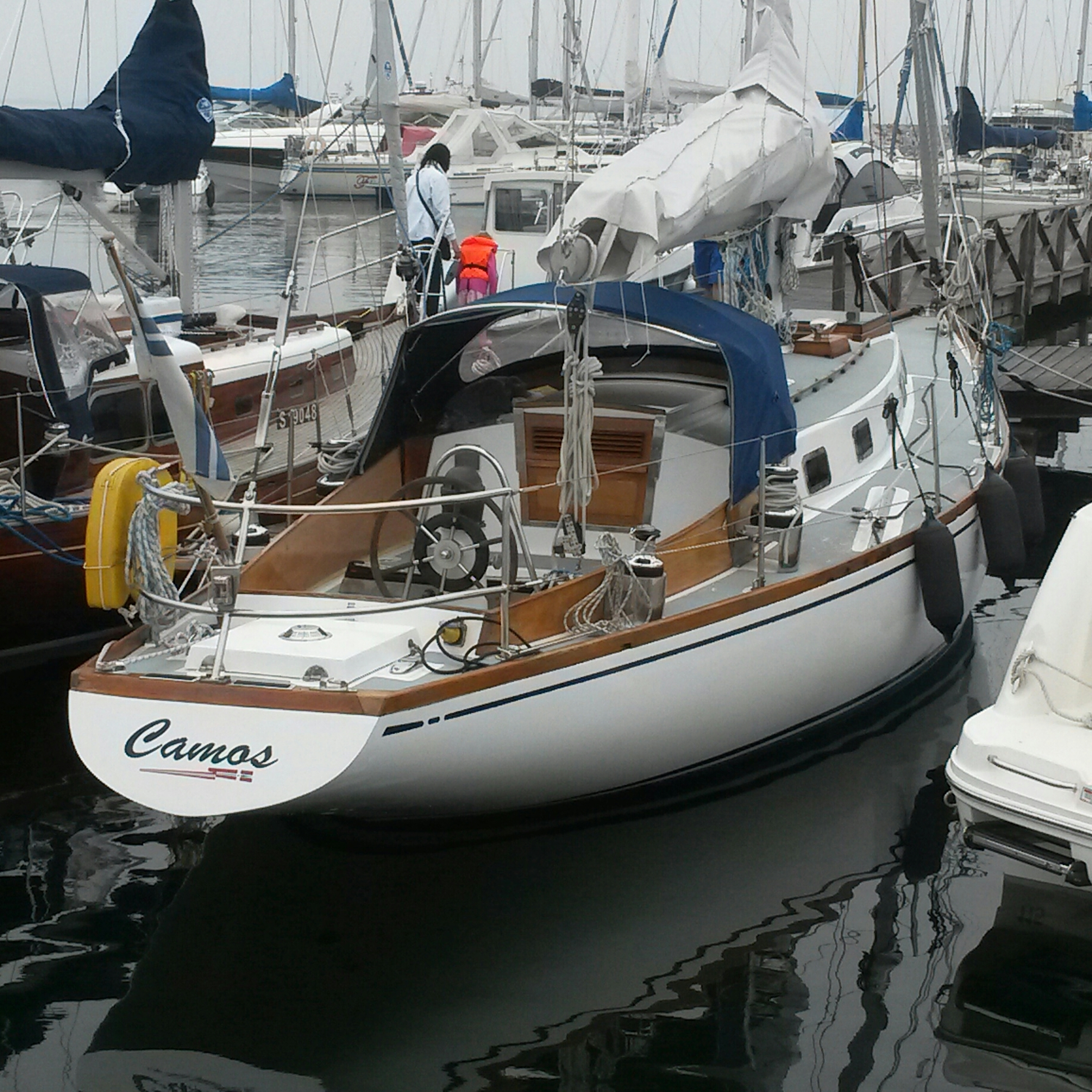

Development
- Designer: Sparkman & Stephens
- Year: 1967-1970
- No. built: 90
- Builder: Nautor Swan
- Name: Swan 36

Boat
- Displacement: 15,400 lb (7,000 kg)
- Draft: 6.0 ft (1.8 m)

Hull
- Type: Keelboat
- Construction: GRP
- LOA: 36 ft (11 m)
- LWL: 25 ft 6 in (7.77 m)
- Beam: 9 ft 8 in (2.95 m)

Hull appendages
- Keel: Fin keel with skeg hung rudder

Rig
- Rig type: Sloop
- Mast height: 43.04 ft 0 in (13.12 m)

Sails
- Mainsail area: 229 sq ft (21.3 m^{2})
- Spinnaker area: 1,088 sq ft (101.1 m^{2})

Swan 36 is a fin keeled, fiberglass constructed masthead sloop first manufactured by Nautor's Swan in 1967. The first Swan sailing yacht ever produced by the firm, it was designed to serve recreationally but also compete in the One Ton Cup.

Production continued until 1971, with a total of 90 Swan 36 boats being built.

The 36 was designed by Sparkman & Stephens who were the number one designers in the world at the time and also the designers of the first 775 Swan yachts built by Nautor.

The design is sometimes confused with the 1988 Swan 36 designed by Germán Frers, which is now usually referred to as the Swan 36-2 to differentiate it from the unrelated 1967 Sparkman & Stephens Swan 36 design.

== Design ==
Its main dimensions are length overall LOA 10,9 m, Length of waterline LWL 7,77 Beam 2,95 m, and displacement of 7000 kg, of which 3600 kg is ballast.

Its racing success is very much based on the designer’s well timed decision to use a separate fin keel and rudder as opposed to the traditional full keel arrangement (a so-called split lateral plane). This reduced the wetted surface area of the hull and thus also the frictional drag, which made the yacht faster, and with the rudder placed further aft also more agile. Despite separate fin keel and a rudder had been used before in some of the Sparkman & Stephens' lighter sailboat designs such as the Lightning, this was the first time this arrangement was successfully used in production keelboats.

=== Development ===
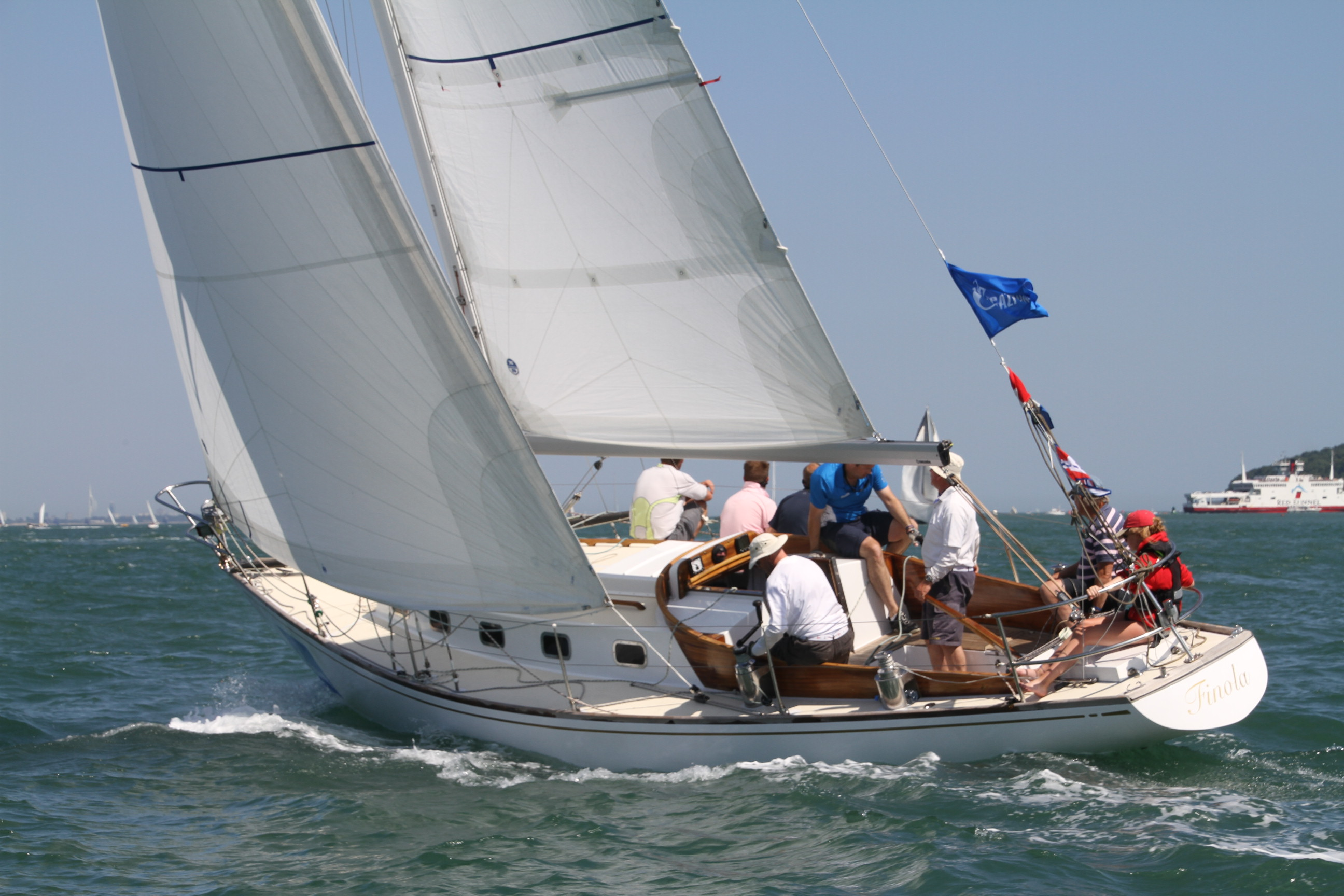
Swan 36 GBR23806 Finola at the 2013 Swan Europeans in Cowes (GBR) held by the Royal Yacht Squadron

Unlike most of the later Swan models, the 36 wasn't designed solely for Nautor as it had already been introduced before as a wooden constructed full keel Gaia Class version bearing the same S&S design number 1710. Both of the 1710 designs have the same lines plan but the developed version which was to become Swan 36 had two major improvements; the fin keel and the GRP hull structure which were both completely new features in keelboat design and thus offered major advantage over competition. The design #1710 is based on S&S design #1478 Hestia which also has an identical lines plan but different LOA. Because of these two clear and completely new advantages, the timing became a crucial factor for Nautor as in 1967 the fin keel with a separate rudder was rapidly becoming a standard in race boat designs and the new GRP structure became a tempting alternative for the boat yards all over the world. Nautor used this opportunity very effectively and was able to launch these fin keeled and well-built large GRP hulls well before any of the competitors could react to the situation. This new construction material provided the means for faster manufacturing and lower production costs, but also brought in fair amount of risks as GRP was a relatively unknown material at the time. Advice on the dimensioning was sought in co-operation with Lloyd's Registers Åke Lindqvist, who was the Lloyd's principal surveyor in Finland at that time. He took an active interest in the development of this new construction material and used to accompany Rod Stephens on his monthly inspection trips to Nautor. The two ran a friendly competition about who could find more design faults or things to improve. The result was that things fairly quickly got right with respect to proper seagoing layouts, scantlings and the right working methods. As far as the credibility of the fin keel structure was concerned, in the same year S&S had already finished one of their most remarkable racing designs, the 1967 America's Cup winner Intrepid featuring a fin keel and a separate rudder which proved that this new design feature can win races. Together with the S&S design badge, these technical innovations made Swan 36 an interesting choice for the buyers even before its launch. An example of this rapidly growing interest can be found in October 1967 Yachtsman magazine which describes Swan 36 a "fearsome racing machine" which is quite remarkable considering her actual breakthrough to the racing success in the 1968 Cowes Week was almost a full year away. It took a considerably long time for the yard to produce anything this radical again, but the brand new ClubSwan 50 has received similar reviews by the experts - even before racing. Swan 36 is still a very competitive yacht and in ideal conditions it can still win races even against much bigger and newer yachts. Swan 36 was also sold in the US under the name Palmer Johnson: PJ 36. The Swan 36 series is unique in the Swan line, since the builders in the 60s thought it would be crazy to first build a whole boat (the plug for the mould) and then scrap it once the mould was done, so they decided to make the plug in the finest mahogany. This plug was then to become the hull nr 000 and was eventually completed as a real yacht and it is still sailing (in 2020) as the world's only wooden Swan and currently under the name of Catharina II.

== Racing ==
The Swan 36 quickly established itself as one of the fastest commercially available sailing yachts of its class. The design achieved international recognition in 1968 when Casse Tête II (Renamed Carte Blanche) sa Swan 36 skippered by David Johnson, became the first yacht to win all seven races in a single Cowes Week regatta. Cowes Week, one of the largest and most prestigious sailing regattas in the world, provided significant international exposure for the new design. This unprecedented competitive achievement proved instrumental in the yard's subsequent commercial success, contributing directly to increased sales and broader market recognition.

== Cruising ==
However the racing success was not all the boat had to offer as it was also decided that it should be more comfortable and luxurious on the inside than any of the competing makes. For that reason, Nautor had decided to use their own interior designer to complete the management’s vision of a fast and luxurious racing yacht with an attractive price tag. The result was an unprecedented combination of competitiveness and comfort combined with a superior cost efficiency brought by the new fiberglass construction method and the skilled boatbuilders of Jakobstad. This combination of speed, quality and affordability enabled the subsequent commercial success for the whole yard and the creation of Swan brand. Nautor introduced its successor Swan 37 in 1970 which also became a very successful racing yacht.

=== The Interior ===
According to the original business idea of Pekka Koskenkylä, the Swan 36 had to be not only a winner, but its interior also had to be different and more luxurious than any of the earlier and existing S&S #1710 designs. Because of this and also because of regional marketing reasons a famous Swedish naval architect Olle Enderlein was hired to assist Sparkman & Stephens in designing the interior to Swan 36. The result was something very different with wide open spaces and completely non fiberglass atmosphere. This interior design allowed the sleeping capacity to be increased from six to seven which was one more than its predecessors had to offer. This was achieved by putting a wide convertible U-Shaped settee to the port side of the saloon. With the table in raised position it gave comfortable area for six persons to eat and with the table in lowered position it converted into a large double bed while leaving the aisle free for people to walk back and forth. With the lifting back rest on the settee the mid ships sleeping capacity was raised to three. The interior design also featured an unusually large galley which occupied most of the starboard side of the saloon. This saloon arrangement had its clear advantages while in port but some sailors thought it was not entirely practical while under sail and because of this customer feedback the interior was largely re-designed to the succeeding model Swan 37.

In 2018 Nautor introduced a new radical 36 footer designed by Juan Kouyoumdjian, the ClubSwan 36.
