= Insectoid robot =

Robot featuring some insect-like features

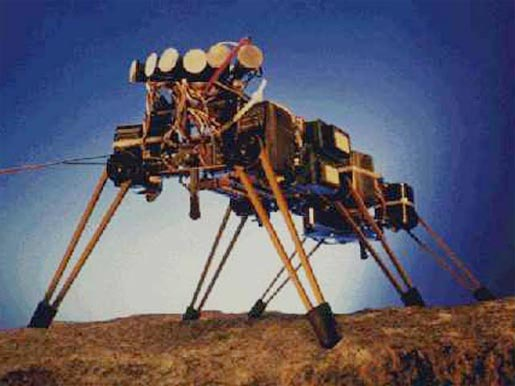
Genghis, a research robot from the 1990s

An insectoid robot is a, usually small, robot featuring some insect-like features. These can include the methods of locomotion (including flying), methods of navigation, and artificial intelligence based on insect models. Many of the problems faced by miniature robot designers have been solved by insect evolution. Researchers therefore look to insects for inspiration and solutions.

== Locomotion ==
=== Walking ===
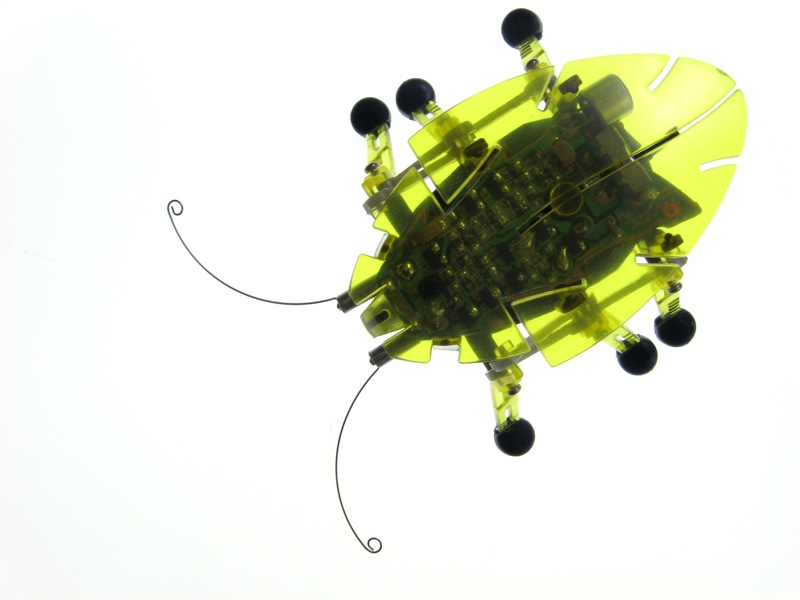
A small robot designed to replicate insect functionality. Often used as toys.

Robot locomotion has frequently been inspired by insect physiology. These robots typically take the form of a hexapod. Research has become multidisciplinary, involving not only robotics engineers, but also biologists, especially neurobiologists. Engineers gain from thisrelationship by acquiring a better understanding of the functioning of the insects they have used to model their robots. Biologists in turn, gain a platform on which they can test their theories of insect motor control.

Building a robot that can walk on a flat surface in the laboratory is a fairly straightforward task. A hexapod robot with mechanically linked simple pegs for legs will achieve this task. Then again, a wheeled robot might be even simpler, but may be entirely unable to solve the much more difficult problem of crossing rough terrain with unpredictable obstacles. For this, articulated joints in legs like a real insect, with sensor-motor control like the neurology of a real insect are needed. A simple rhythmic cycle of the legs will not do. The legs and joints must be controlled individually and in combination according to information received from limb position and load sensors.

The gait of insects changes with desired speed. Research has shown that these gait patterns can still be generated locally in many insects even when completely disconnected from the central nervous system. In some insects, for instance the cockroach, the gait changes in a running insect partly because the nervous system of the insect cannot respond rapidly enough. A running cockcroach changes its gait to pushing with all three legs on one side together. The characteristic side-to-side motion of the animal is at the biomechanical resonant frequency set by the insect's weight and spring stiffness of the combined legs. This mode needs no input from an external controller and it is both efficient and stable. Researchers recognise the advantages of features of real insects, but as of 2004, "they have only rarely come together in a robot..."

=== Flying ===
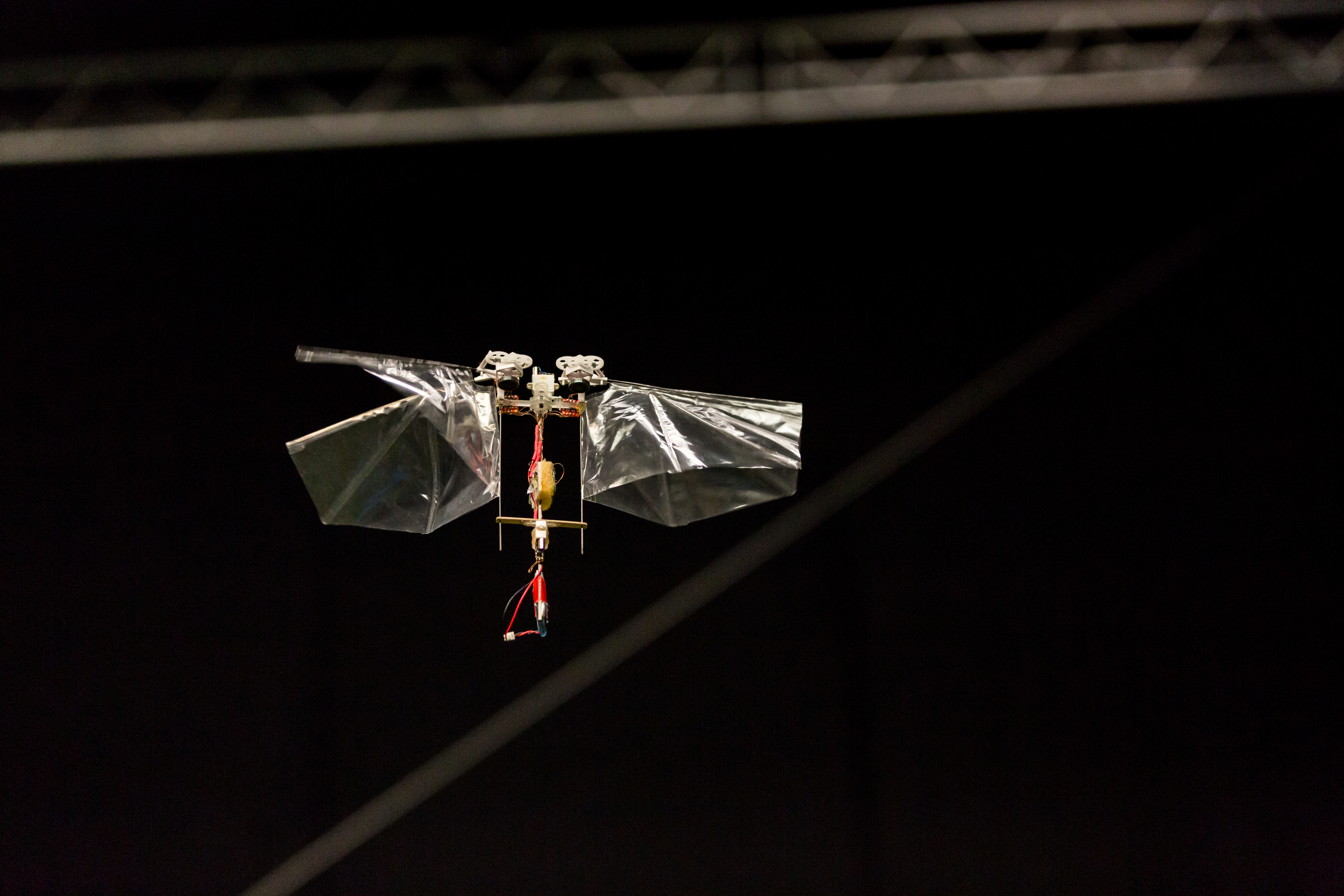
The DelFly flying insectoid robot

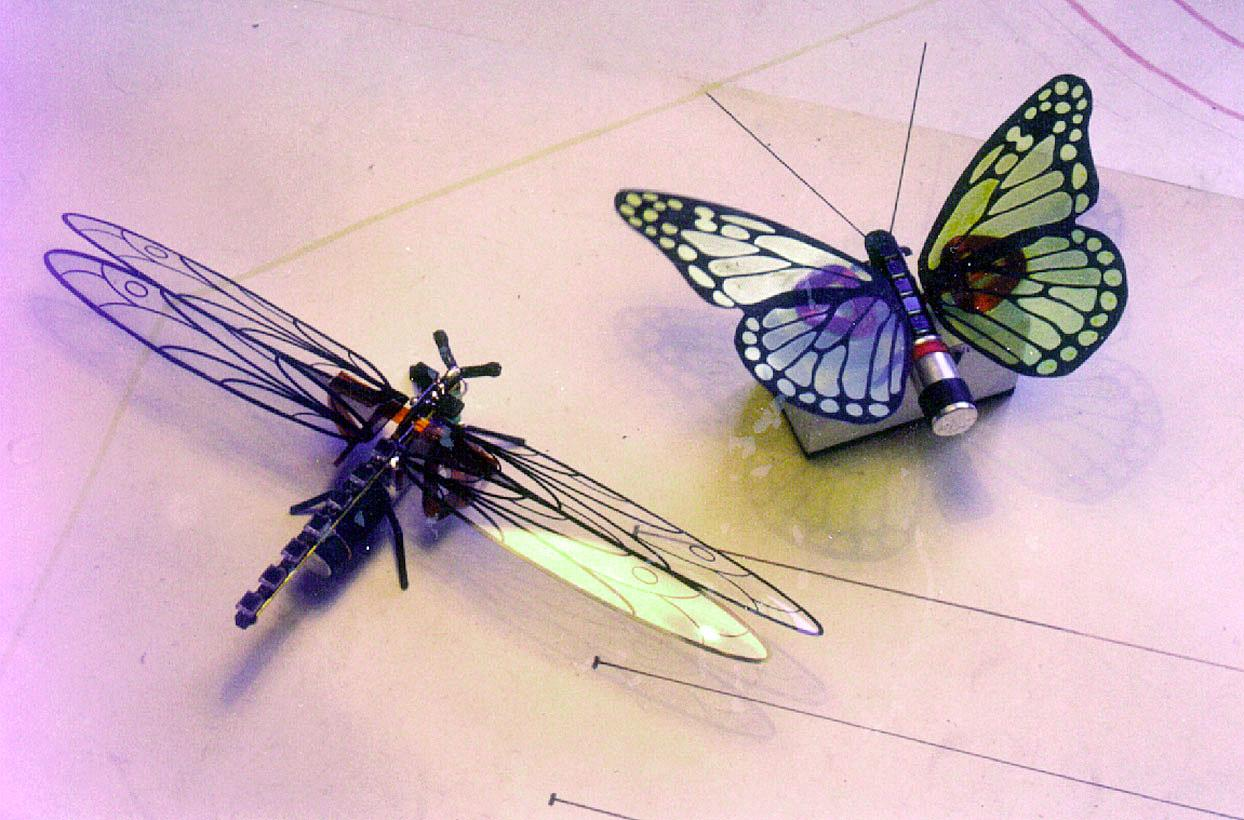
Two flying insectoid robots designed using the BEAM robotics of Mark Tilden

For a very small aircraft, fixed-wing flight becomes impractical due to rapidly decreasing lift-to-drag ratio with size. Insect flight, on the other hand, is always ornithopteric which suggests an approach for insectoid robots. Ma et al. for instance, developed a tethered robot fly with flapping wings constructed of piezoelectric material. Ma chose to model the robot on the fly because, according to their paper, it is the most agile creature alive, and therefore the most difficult to emulate as a robot.

== Artificial intelligence ==
Insects have very little resource to devote to intelligence in the human sense of brain processing power. The number of neurons in an insect varies by species from one million to as few as ten thousand. By comparison, humans have 86 billion neurons. Further, large brains are extremely energy hungry. Insects must therefore find other methods of developing intelligence such as embodying intelligence in hardware, local sensor-motor connections, and swarm intelligence. At one time it was hoped that robots would avoid the need for such solutions because of the rapidly increasing processing power and decreasing size of computers according to Moore's law. However, this process seems to be reaching its limit and insect solutions look increasingly attractive.

Walking rhythms independent of the central nervous system in cockroaches have already been mentioned. A major breakthrough in flying insectoid robots came by applying the same principles to the wings. Attempts to control the angle of attack of the wings with a central processor were not successful because a lift to weight ratio greater than unity could not be achieved. Removing the processor and allowing the wings to rotate passively at the natural frequency of the mechanical system reduced the weight sufficiently to allow controlled insectoid flight for the first time in 2008 with a fly-like robot. However, the robot was externally powered through an umbilical rather than completely free flight.

Swarms of robots can solve problems that are not possible to solve with the limited processing resource of a single robot. They are particular useful in exploration tasks. They can be used to find the shortest route to a destination, and have been proposed to search for gas sources in dangerous environments. Another proposal is robots that self-assemble into a structure to allow the swarm to cross a gap in the manner of ants.

=== Navigation ===
Flying insects have poor visual spatial resolution, must respond rapidly, and have little to no advanced neural processing power. Due to limitations of space and weight, flying insectoid robots have a very similar set of problems. In 2003, Franceschini et al. investigated the possibility of using insect solutions to solve robot navigation problems. Franceschini built a research robot based on the neural physiology of a fly. The robot was not actually a flying robot, rather, it was a wheeled vehicle. The aim of the research was to show that simple sensor-motor control using only visual motion detection could navigate a course.

Using insect intelligence in robot navigation has been going on since 1986, but initially was not taken up by engineers building robots. It was felt that because insects lack a visual cortex, and hence cannot perform advanced visual processing and image formation, a robot based on such technology would not be very successful. Franceschini argues that it is not necessary to possess a visual cortex for the navigation task, and it would in fact be an unnecessary burden on an insect robot (both weight and processing time would be issues). Franceschini points out that many of the visual systems in humans do not pass through the visual cortex either. It is not always necessary to form images and identify objects.

== See also ==
- Materially engineered artificial pollinators
- RoboBee

== Bibliography ==
- G.C.H.E. de Croon, J.J.G. Dupeyroux, S.B. Fuller, J. A. R. Marshall, "Insect-inspired AI for autonomous robots", Science Robotics, vol. 7, no. 67, 2022 doi:10.1126/scirobotics.abl6334.
- Fred Delcomyn, "Insect walking and robotics", Annual Review of Entomology, vo. 49, pp. 51–70, 2004.
- N. Franceschini, J. M. Pichon, C. Blanes, "From insect vision to robot vision", Philosophical Transactions of the Royal Society B, vol. 337, iss. 1281, 29 September 1992 doi:10.1098/rstb.1992.0106.
- Kevin Y. Ma, Pakpong Chirarattananon, Sawyer B. Fuller, and Robert J. Wood, "Controlled flight of a biologically inspired, insect-scale robot", Science, vol. 340, iss. 6132, pp. 603–607, 3 May 2013 doi:10.1126/science.1231806.
- Bradley Voytek, "Are there really as many neurons in the human brain as stars in the Milky Way?", Scitable, 20 May 2013.
- Robert J. Wood, "The first takeoff of a biologically inspired at-scale robotic insect", IEEE Transactions on Robotics, vol. 24, iss. 2, pp. 341–347, April 2008 {{doi:10.1109/TRO.2008.916997}}.
