= ClubSwan 50 =

One-design keelboat

Development
- Designer: Juan Kouyoumdjian; Michele Bönan
- Location: Finland
- Year: 2015
- Builder: Oy Nautor AB
- Role: Racer-Cruiser
- Name: ClubSwan 50

Boat
- Crew: Eight
- Displacement: 18,188 lb (8,250 kg)
- Draft: 11.48 ft (3.50 m)

Hull
- Type: monohull
- Construction: carbon fibre with a foam core
- LOA: 50.00 ft (15.24 m)
- LWL: 45.93 ft (14.00 m)
- Beam: 13.78 ft (4.20 m)
- Engine: Volvo D2-40 40 hp (30 kW) diesel engine

Hull appendages
- Keel: Fin keel
- Ballast: 7,605 lb (3,450 kg)
- Rudder: Dual spade-type rudders

Rig
- Rig type: Bermuda rig
- I foretriangle height: 65.22 ft (19.88 m)
- J foretriangle base: 20.67 ft (6.30 m)
- P mainsail luff: 65.75 ft (20.04 m)
- E mainsail foot: 23.72 ft (7.23 m)

Sails
- Sailplan: Fractional rigged sloop
- Mainsail area: 1,001 sq ft (93.0 m^{2})
- Jib/genoa area: 699 sq ft (64.9 m^{2})
- Gennaker area: 2,530 sq ft (235 m^{2})
- Upwind sail area: 1,700 sq ft (160 m^{2})
- Downwind sail area: 3,531 sq ft (328.0 m^{2})

The ClubSwan 50 is a one design and International Rating Certificate racer-cruiser, first built in 2015 by Oy Nautor AB. As of 2023 it remained in production.

The boat was designed for the 50th anniversary of the founding of the manufacturer, Nautor's Swan, and was the result of a design competition the company held in 2015. The competition specified "a contemporary, fast, competitive one-design that could sail offshore and be converted to a sports cruiser sailed with limited crew." It also added, "in one word, this yacht has to be cool." The boat was also intended as a class to compete for the Nation's Cup.

The design was Kouyoumdjian's first for Nautor and led to him designing other ClubSwan series racing boats, including the ClubSwan 36, 80 and the 125.

The ClubSwan 50 was accepted as a World Sailing international class in 2018.

== Design ==
Designed by Juan Kouyoumdjian, the hull is built predominantly of pre-preg carbon fibre, with a foam core and a teak-faced deck. The hull has hard chines, a negative sheer, a reverse dreadnought stem; an open transom; dual, internally mounted, sawtoothed, spade-type rudders controlled by dual wheels and a fixed, high modulus, carbon fibre fin keel with weighted bulb or an optional shoal-draft keel. It displaces 18,188 lb (8,250 kg) empty and carries 7,605 lb (3,450 kg) of lead ballast. It has a low freeboard.

The boat has a draft of 11.48 ft (3.50 m) with the standard keel and 7.2 ft (2.2 m) with the optional shoal draft keel.

The boat is fitted with a Swedish Volvo D2-40 diesel engine of 40 hp (30 kW) for docking and manoeuvring. The fuel tank holds 45 U.S. gallons (170 L; 37 imp gal) and the fresh water tank has a capacity of 63 U.S. gallons (240 L; 52 imp gal).

The interior was designed by Michele Bönan. The design has standard sleeping accommodation for four people, with a double island berth in the bow cabin, two L-shaped settees in the main cabin and an aft cabin with a double berth on the port side. The galley is located on the starboard side just aft of the companionway ladder. The galley is L-shaped and is equipped with a sink. The head is located just aft of the bow cabin on both sides and includes a shower. A third cabin with a double berth may be installed starboard aft, to provide a total of sleeping space for six people.

It has a fractional sloop rig with a fixed bowsprit and square-topped mainsail, a deck-stepped mast, three sets of swept spreaders and carbon fibre spars. For sailing downwind the design may be equipped with an asymmetrical spinnaker of 2,530 sq ft (235 m^{2}). The boat has a hull speed of 9.08 kn (16.82 km/h).

== Reception ==
According to Yachting World, "the ClubSwan 50 is quite simply the most extreme-looking production yacht I’ve seen. No computer-enhanced renderings could do justice to seeing this yacht for the first time. She is fantastically awesome."
