= ClubSwan 125 =

Sailboat class

Development
- Designer: Juan Kouyoumdjian; Adriana Monk
- Location: Finland
- Year: 2021
- No. built: 1
- Builder: Oy Nautor AB
- Role: Racer
- Name: ClubSwan 125

Boat
- Displacement: 130,734 lb (59,300 kg)
- Draft: 24.28 ft (7.40 m)

Hull
- Type: monohull
- Construction: glassfibre
- LOA: 139.83 ft (42.62 m)
- LWL: 120.08 ft (36.60 m)
- Beam: 28.71 ft (8.75 m)
- Engine: Marine Diesel Sweden VGT 600 500 hp (373 kW) diesel engine

Hull appendages
- Keel: Canting keel with weighted bulb
- Ballast: 51,213 lb (23,230 kg)
- Rudder: Dual spade-type rudders

Rig
- Rig type: Bermuda rig
- I foretriangle height: 174.87 ft (53.30 m)
- J foretriangle base: 54.13 ft (16.50 m)
- P mainsail luff: 169.62 ft (51.70 m)
- E mainsail foot: 60.20 ft (18.35 m)

Sails
- Sailplan: Fractional rigged sloop
- Mainsail area: 7,093.42 sq ft (659.000 m^{2})
- Jib/genoa area: 4,445.50 sq ft (413.000 m^{2})
- Gennaker area: 13,993.08 sq ft (1,300.000 m^{2})
- Total sail area: 21,108.03 sq ft (1,961.000 m^{2})

The ClubSwan 125 is a Finnish planing supermaxi sailboat that was designed by Juan Kouyoumdjian as an International Rating Certificate racer and first built in 2021. The interior was designed by Adriana Monk.

The design is the second of the new racing series of ClubSwan boats, following the ClubSwan 50.

== Production ==
The project was announced in 2017 and was a commission by Russian businessman Dmitry Rybolovlev, who owned a ClubSwan 50. Construction of the first boat by Oy Nautor AB in Finland, was started in 2019 and the boat was delivered in May 2021 in the middle of the COVID-19 pandemic. It was named Skorpios for the island of Skorpios that Rybolovlev owns. As of 2023 the design was still advertised as being in production, but only one boat had been produced.

== Design ==
The design is intended to be the fastest monohull sailboat ever built. The project originally started to create an inshore racer-cruiser yacht, but over time changed to become an offshore record setter.

The ClubSwan 125 is a racing keelboat, built predominantly of pre-preg carbon fibre with a honeycomb Nomex and CoreCell core. It has a fractional sloop rig with a fixed bowsprit, carbon fibre spars and elliptical section AeroSix carbon fibre standing rigging. The hull has a plumb stem; a plumb transom; dual, canted, internally mounted spade-type rudders controlled by dual wheels, hull-mounted hydrofoils and a canting fin keel with a weighted bulb that can be canted up to 42° and with a trim tab. The winches are all hydraulically powered. It displaces 130,734 lb (59,300 kg) and carries 51,213 lb (23,230 kg) of ballast.

It also has water ballast tanks, with 2,113 U.S. gallons (8,000 L; 1,759 imp gal) mid and 1,848 U.S. gallons (7,000 L; 1,539 imp gal) aft tanks. The tanks can be filled in 45 seconds and take 30 seconds to transfer weight from one side of the boat to the other.

The boat has a draft of 24.28 ft (7.40 m) with the keel fully extended.

The boat is fitted with a Marine Diesel Sweden VGT 500 diesel engine of 500 hp (373 kW), driving a retractable propeller, for docking and manoeuvring. It also has a Fischer Panda 10000i 8 kW generator. The fuel tank holds 264 U.S. gallons (1,000 L; 220 imp gal) and the fresh water tank has a capacity of 350 U.S. gallons (1,300 L; 290 imp gal). The main engine must be kept running during sailing to power the four hydraulic pumps needed to operate the winches and the canting keel.

Interior layouts are owner specified and the first boat completed had a very lightweight and minimalist, futurist interior design.

For reaching and sailing downwind the design has an asymmetrical spinnaker of 13,993.08 sq ft (1,300.000 m^{2}).

The boat has the second highest IRC rating ever issued. It was also designed with its own tender to assist in anchoring and also bring fuel and supplies to the boat since its deep draft keel makes many ports inaccessible.

== Operational history ==
In August 2021, Skorpios became the largest monohull sailboat to have raced in the Fastnet Race.

In a 2019 Megayacht News preview, Diane M. Byrne noted, "Juan Kouyoumdjian, her designer, credits the owner, who will sail with a professional crew, with wanting such a high-performance project. 'I think we are doing something that will set a milestone in the sailing world,' he asserts".

In a 2021 review for Yachting World, Toby Hodges wrote, "The adrenalin of sailing the ClubSwan 125 Skorpios is perhaps heightened by the fear of the unknown: everything about this yacht seems to be on another scale altogether. This is, by some margin, the biggest offshore racing monohull, and certainly the largest ever racing Swan. It boasts possibly the deepest draught non-lifting keel (7.4m) and the largest sailplan combination ever conceived. In short, Skorpios is a seemingly limitless source of superlatives."

In a 2021 review for Boat International, Elaine Bunting wrote, "Skorpios is a yacht that towers over history. When the new supermaxi racer rounded Ireland's famous Fastnet Rock Lighthouse in the Rolex Fastnet Race in August, it was the first boat in the event's 96 years to look down on it, its mast being four metres taller than the historic structure."

In a 2021 Sailing World review, James Boyd wrote, "Given that Skorpios was built in the middle of a pandemic and is so fiendishly complex, it is a miracle it was launched at all."

== See also ==
- List of sailing boat types
