= ClubSwan 43 =

Sailboat class

Development
- Designer: Juan Kouyoumdjian; Lucio Micheletti
- Location: Finland
- Year: 2024
- No. built: 0
- Builder: Oy Nautor AB
- Role: Racer-Cruiser
- Name: ClubSwan 43

Boat
- Displacement: 15,540 lb (7,049 kg)
- Draft: 8.8 ft (2.7 m)

Hull
- Type: monohull
- Construction: glassfibre
- LOA: 47.7 ft (14.5 m), including bowsprit
- LOH: 43.0 ft (13.1 m)
- Beam: 15.0 ft (4.6 m)
- Engine: Yanmar 3JH5E 39 hp (29 kW) diesel engine

Hull appendages
- Keel: Fin keel, with weighted bulb
- Rudder: Spade-type rudder

Rig
- Rig type: Bermuda rig

Sails
- Sailplan: Fractional rigged sloop
- Mainsail area: 783 sq ft (72.7 m^{2})
- Jib/genoa area: 490 sq ft (46 m^{2})
- Gennaker area: 1,873 sq ft (174.0 m^{2})
- Total sail area: 1,272 sq ft (118.2 m^{2})

The ClubSwan 43 is a Finnish sailboat that was designed by Juan Kouyoumdjian as a one design racer-cruiser, with first deliveries expected in 2024. The interior design is by Lucio Micheletti and engineering by Pure Design & Engineering of New Zealand.

The boat was originally designed with a length overall of 41 ft (12 m) and an initial designation of ClubSwan 41, but was lengthened to comply with new Offshore Racing Congress Cat B rules.

== Production ==
The design will be built by Fibre Mechanics in Lymington, England, for the manufacturer, Oy Nautor AB of Finland. This will be the first Swan-series boat built in the United Kingdom. First deliveries are expected in 2024.

== Design ==
The ClubSwan 43 is a racing keelboat, built predominantly of E-glass, with carbon fibre reinforcement. It has a fractional sloop rig with a fixed bowsprit, with a deck-stepped mast and carbon fibre spars. The hull has a plumb stem, an open plumb transom, an internally mounted spade-type rudder controlled by dual wheels and a fixed fin keel with a weighted bulb. It displaces 15,540 lb (7,049 kg).

The boat has a draft of 8.8 ft (2.7 m) with the standard keel.

The boat is fitted with a Japanese Yanmar 3JH5E diesel engine of 39 hp (29 kW) for docking and manoeuvring. The fuel tank holds 40 U.S. gallons (150 L; 33 imp gal) and the fresh water tank has a capacity of 80 U.S. gallons (300 L; 67 imp gal). There is also a 8 U.S. gallons (30 L; 6.7 imp gal) holding tank.

The design has sleeping accommodation for six people, with a double "V"-berth in the bow cabin, two straight settees in the main cabin and two aft cabins, each with a double berth. The galley is located on the port side just forward of the companionway ladder. The galley is L-shaped and is equipped with a two-burner stove, an ice box and a double sink. The head is located amidships on the starboard side.

For sailing downwind the design may be equipped with an asymmetrical spinnaker of 1,873 sq ft (174.0 m^{2}), flown from the bowsprit.

== Operational history ==
In a June 2023 review for Yachting World, Toby Hodges noted, "the latest ClubSwan 43 is intended as a crossover boat offering a pure one-design or ORC racing experience, while also having enough accommodation to make a sporty cruiser."

== See also ==
- List of sailing boat types
