= ClubSwan 80 =

Sailboat class

Development
- Designer: Juan Kouyoumdjian
- Location: Finland/Italy
- Year: 2022
- No. built: 1 (2022)
- Builder: Persico Marine
- Role: Racer
- Name: ClubSwan 80

Boat
- Displacement: 42,351 lb (19,210 kg)
- Draft: 20 ft 8 in (6.30 m) keel down

Hull
- Type: monohull
- Construction: carbon fibre
- LOA: 81.30 ft (24.78 m)
- LWL: 78.38 ft (23.89 m)
- Beam: 19.68 ft (6.00 m)
- Engine: diesel engine

Hull appendages
- Keel: Canting fin keel, with weighted bulb
- Ballast: 14,330 lb (6,500 kg)
- Rudder: Twin spade-type rudders

Rig
- Rig type: Bermuda rig

Sails
- Sailplan: Fractional rigged sloop
- Upwind sail area: 4,736 sq ft (440.0 m^{2})

The ClubSwan 80 is a Finnish maxi yacht that was designed by Juan Kouyoumdjian as a one design racer and first built in 2022.

The project leader is Enrico Chieffi, vice president of Nautor, with Vittorio Volontè as project manager. Giovanni Belgrano did the engineering, Scott Ferguson designed the rig and Mario Pedol of Nauta Design created the interiors.

== Production ==
The project was announced at the boot Düsseldorf show in 2019. Construction of the first boat commenced in 2020 and it was delivered on 23 June 2022. The development of the boat was delayed by the COVID-19 pandemic.

Due to the Oy Nautor AB plant in Finland already operating at full capacity, a production partnership was established and the design is built by Persico Marine in Nembro, Italy. As of 2023 it remains in production.

== Design ==
The ClubSwan 80 is a racing keelboat, built predominantly of carbon fibre. It has a fractional sloop rig with a retractable carbon fibre bowsprit, three sets of swept spreaders and carbon fibre spars. The hull has a plumb stem, a plumb transom with a drop-down tailgate, dual internally mounted spade-type rudders controlled by dual wheels and a canting, high aspect ratio fin keel with a weighted bulb. It also has a separate lifting canard foil with a variable angle of attack of +/-8° mounted forward of the keel to address leeway. It displaces 42,351 lb (19,210 kg) and carries 14,330 lb (6,500 kg) of ballast.

The boat has a draft of 20 ft 8 in (6.30 m) with the canting keel down and 14 ft 9 in (4.50 m) with it up.

The boat is fitted with an inboard diesel engine with a retractable driveshaft and propeller, for docking and manoeuvring.

The design was intended to have a minimalist interior to keep the boat's weight low for racing, but accommodations suitable for cruising may be installed through the use of modules. These include a removable gimbled oven, salon tables, air conditioning system, berths and three carbon-fibre heads. The first boat completed has a neo-futuristic minimal interior design.

For sailing downwind the design may be equipped with an asymmetrical spinnaker flown from the retractable bowsprit.

== Operational history ==
The first boat built, My Song, competed in the Maxi Yacht Rolex Cup held from 4-10 September 2022 in Porto Cervo, Sardinia, coming in third in its first race sailed in and sixth overall at the end of the competition.

The first boat was publicly shown at the Monaco Yacht Show, 28 September to 1 October 2022.

In a 2022 review for Yachting World, Matthew Sheahan wrote, "with the breeze up it was also clear that, like other modern lightweight yachts, the performance is more about understanding apparent wind sailing where bearing away doesn't always mean easing sheets. At one point we were sailing at 12 knots with everything still sheeted in as if we were going upwind with the apparent wind angle showing 35°. Except we were actually sailing at 70° true. If you're not keeping an eye on the numbers boats like this can mess with your mind."

In a 2022 Yachting World review, Toby Hodges noted, "the standard base boat is the lightest and fastest format – you can buy extra comfort but not performance, says Swan, a neat philosophy for one-design racing. The interior, although largely a carbon shell, still manages to waft elegant style thanks to the creatives at Nauta Design and should suit short term sports cruising."

== See also ==
- List of sailing boat types
