= DelFly =

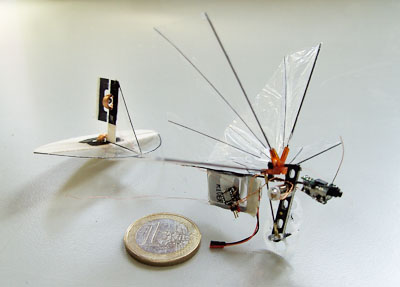
DelFly Micro, a 3.07 gram flapping wing MAV with a camera

The DelFly is a fully controllable video camera-equipped flapping wing micro air vehicle (MAV) or ornithopter developed at the Micro Air Vehicle Lab of the Delft University of Technology, together with Wageningen University & Research.

The DelFly project focuses on fully functioning systems and follows a top-down approach toward ever smaller and more autonomous flapping wing MAVs.

The DelFly Micro with its 10 cm wing span and 3.07 grams is the smallest free flying controllable flapping wing MAV with a video camera and transmitter. Smaller flapping wing MAVs exist, but with no onboard camera. A hobbyist from Albany, New York, built a flapping wing MAV of 920 mg and 60mm wing span, which is the world's smallest free flying flapper to date.

The 28 centimeter 16 gram DelFly II could take-off and land vertically and perform simple forms of autonomous flight, mainly using off-board processing.

The DelFly Explorer measures 28 centimeter while weighing 20 grams and has a miniature stereo vision system for autonomous flight in buildings.

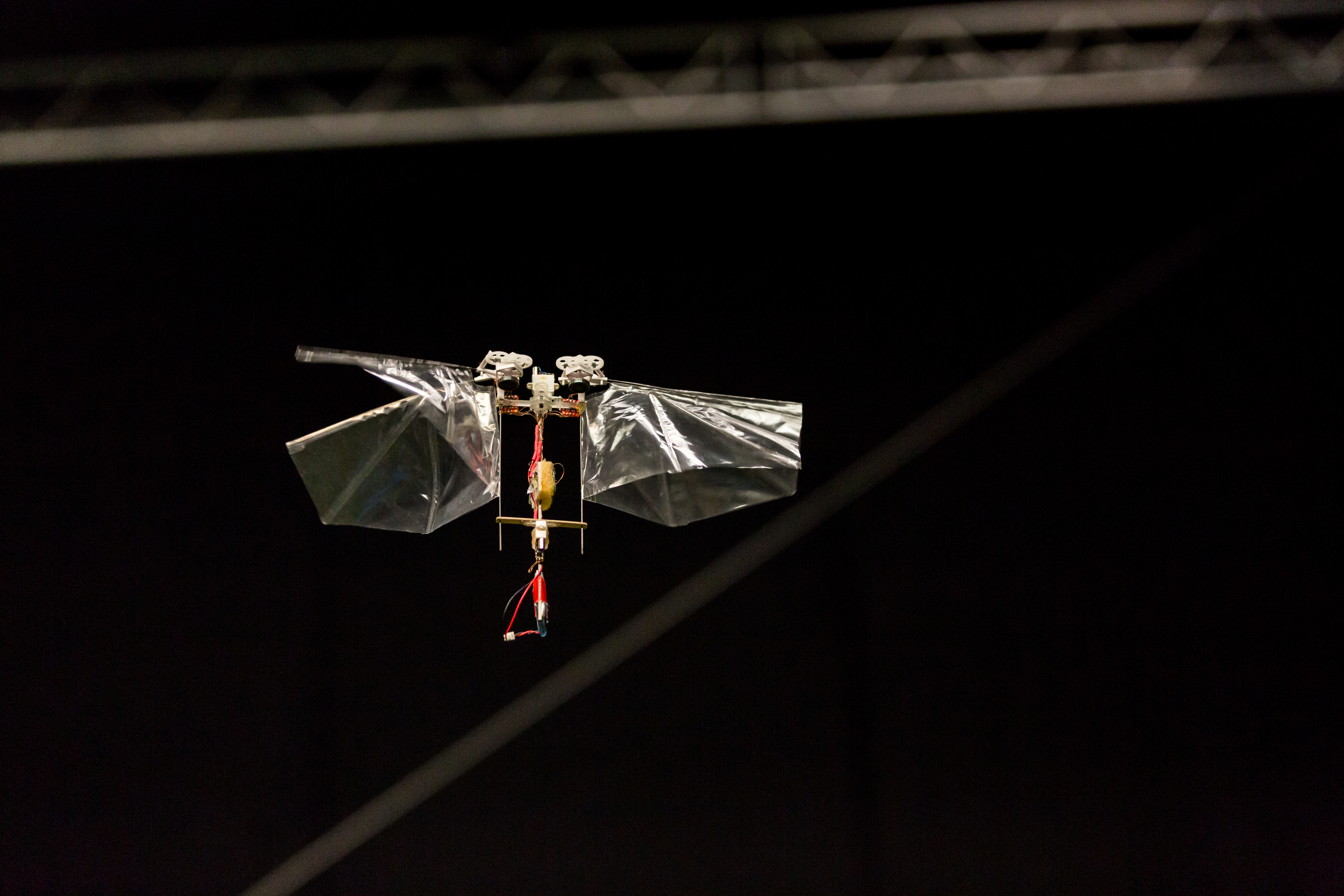
DelFly Nimble in hover

The DelFly Nimble is a very agile, tailless flapping wing MAV. It steers by modifying the motions of its wings, which allows it to perform high-speed maneuvers such as 360-degree flips. One of its uses is in studying insect flight; mimicking the very fast escape maneuvers of fruit flies revealed a new aerodynamic mechanism that helps to make rapid banked turns. A startup company Flapper Drones is developing a commercial version of the DelFly Nimble for uses in the entertainment field, including drone shows, festivals, theme parks.

== History ==
The DelFly project began in 2005 as a Design Synthesis Exercise for a group of Bachelor of Science students at the TU Delft Faculty of Aerospace Engineering of the Delft University of Technology. The flapping wing design was mentored by Wageningen University, the remote control and micro camera integration by Ruijsink Dynamic Engineering, and the real-time image processing by the TU Delft. The result of this exercise was the DelFly I, a 50 cm wingspan, 21 grams flapping wing MAV with a camera. The DelFly I could fly fast, and hover slowly, while having reasonably stable camera images.

In 2007, the DelFly II was created: a 28 cm wing span 16 gram flapping wing MAV with a camera. This version was smaller, and had a much broader flight envelope ranging from 7 m/s forward, to near hovering, and backward at -1 m/s. In contrast to the DelFly I, the DelFly II could take-off and land vertically. The DelFly II's flight time was around 15 minutes.

The DelFly II was followed in 2008 by the DelFly Micro, a 10 cm wing span, 3.07 gram flapping wing MAV, also with a camera. The DelFly Micro is fully steerable with 3 controls for the throttle, elevator and rudder. Given the limited onboard energy, the flight time of the DelFly Micro was around 2 to 3 minutes. The DelFly Micro featured in the Guinness book of records 2009 as the smallest airplane in the world with a camera.

The DelFly participated in the 2005, 2007, 2008, 2010 and 2013 editions of the Micro Air Vehicle Competitions and was the first vehicle to perform full autonomous indoor flight.

The DelFly Explorer was created in 2013. It has a stereo vision system that allows autonomous obstacle avoidance even in unknown and unprepared environments.

The DelFly Nimble, presented in 2018, is the first tailless DelFly. It is much more agile than earlier designs; it can hover and fly in any direction up until 7 m/s in forward flight. It has a relatively simple design and is based on commercially of the shelf components and 3D printed parts.

In 2019, a technological spinoff of the Delft University of Technology Flapper Drones developing a commercial version of the DelFly Nimble was founded.

== Influence ==
The DelFly is based on scaling relations for the aerodynamic design of flapping wings, which were discovered in the Dickinson lab at Caltech in collaboration with Wageningen University. Earlier research in the Dickinson lab also inspired The Robobee, both the Robobee and the DelFly design originated from research with robot models of flying insects. The DelFly influenced the TechJect Dragonfly UAV and FlyTech Dragonfly among many others refer to DelFly developments.

== Design challenges ==
The design of autonomous, low-mass, less than 20 grams flapping wing MAVs poses challenges in various domains, including materials, electronics, controls, aerodynamics, computer vision, and artificial intelligence. All these domains feed into each other. For example, studies on the design and aerodynamics of the wings have enhanced the efficiency of flight and the amount of lift generated. This allows carrying a larger payload, such as more onboard sensors and processing. In turn, such onboard processing can be used to perform automatic maneuvers in a wind tunnel, helping to create better models of DelFly and its low Reynolds number aerodynamics.

== Applications ==
Flapping wing MAVs have a natural appearance and are inherently safe by means of their low mass and low speeds of the wings. This makes them well suited to indoor flight, and in the presence of humans. Further, flapping wing MAVs can be used as (augmented reality) toys, and other possible uses include inspection of indoor industrial structures or video streaming of the crowd during indoor events. The DelFly flies well indoors with the air conditioning turned off, and outdoors under very low wind conditions.

The superior flight abilities of the DelFly Nimble, combined with its inherent safety and natural appearance, open new applications in the entertainment field. The startup company Flapper Drones is developing the technology further for drone shows during concerts, festivals, and in theme parks.
