= TechJect Dragonfly UAV =

The Dragonfly is a failed crowdfunding project that was to build a miniaturized four-winged ornithopter UAV designed by TechJect. The Dragonfly supposedly was designed for: aerial photography, interactive gaming, autonomous patrolling for security and surveillance, etc. The project claimed that the UAV was going to manufactured by TechJect, but all development was canceled after crowdfunding IndieGoGo refused to release money.

== Design ==
The unit was envisioned as a miniaturized four-winged ornithopter which uses a flight model based on that of a dragonfly. It was the first palm sized miniaturized ornithopter to be prototyped to exhibit powerful actuation at small sizes, though other larger versions have been developed. (e.g., the DelFly), the Dragonfly was the first to make use of multiple models, each customizable with multiple options, such as wifi connectivity.

The Dragonfly UAV built off the research done at Georgia Institute of Technology's Intelligent Control Systems Laboratory. That research resulted in Patent 9,290,268, filed in 2011 and granted in March 2016. The TectJect company, which spun off from the Georgia Tech Research Corporation, was to develop this technology into a reliable consumer product. After several major design changes and deviations from the original patent, no reliable solution was found.

=== Technical specifications ===
In their crowdfunding pitches TechJect made a number of dubious claims. The Dragonfly was to be equipped with one of three different electronics packages. These could include the Marc-Basic, Marc-2, and Marc-3. In addition, all models were planned to be built to have camera capability, including stereoscopic vision through dual cameras (available with the Marc-3). HD vision was planned to be optional. Power was planned to be provided from a single-cell Li-Po battery rated at 250mAh. The actuator system for the wings was going to be based on either magnetic solenoidal actuators (Alpha model - retired for now) or a Continuously Variable Transmission (CVT) for the Delta, Gamma, and Omega models. With a final goal weight of ~25g and a length of 6", the micro UAV was expected to hover for ~8–10 minutes, with a hybrid flight time (hovering and fixed-wing gliding) of ~25–30 minutes. However, these specifications were announced at the beginning of the crowdfunding campaign and do not reflect any actual hardware.

== Cameras and Sensors ==
TechJect told investors that The Dragonfly would have the ability to be equipped with up to twenty environmental sensors (including GPS and cameras), dependent on electronics package. At minimum, the unit was to be equipped with a 3-axis accelerometer and a 3-axis gyroscope as is required for controlled flight through inertial guidance. At most, the unit was envisioned to equip approximately 20 sensors, including 3-axis accelerometers, 3-axis gyroscopes, 3-axis magnetometers, an ambient light sensor, an ambient humidity sensor, and a differential/absolute pressure sensor.

== Production delays ==
On the third anniversary of the IndieGoGo campaign, TechJect released an update to backers stating that the company "in no position to complete the Dragonfly project in our current condition without a helping hand (partners, additional funding or community support)." TechJect has claimed that the project's failure was the result of a delay in the release of funding by PayPal and IndieGoGo. However, the design was much less mature than what was stated during the crowdfunding campaign, and significant time and money was spent finalizing the mechanical design and selecting appropriate materials. The team apologized to backers for what it termed "our dismal approach to the finish line".

Crowdfund Insider has described the state of the project as "road kill" and "dead in the water". TechCrunch espoused the view that TechJect's pitch "always seemed a bit far-fetched", and cited it as "the latest example of how consumers need to be more careful with crowdfunding". Veckans Affärer described the Dragonfly as "too good to be true", and described it and Pirate3D's Buccaneer 3D printer as part of a trend of crowdfunding projects that had not delivered on their promises.

== See also ==
- Unmanned aerial vehicle
