= TU Delft Faculty of Aerospace Engineering =

Division of Delft University of Technology, Netherlands

Faculty of Aerospace Engineering
- Faculteit Lucht- en Ruimtevaarttechniek
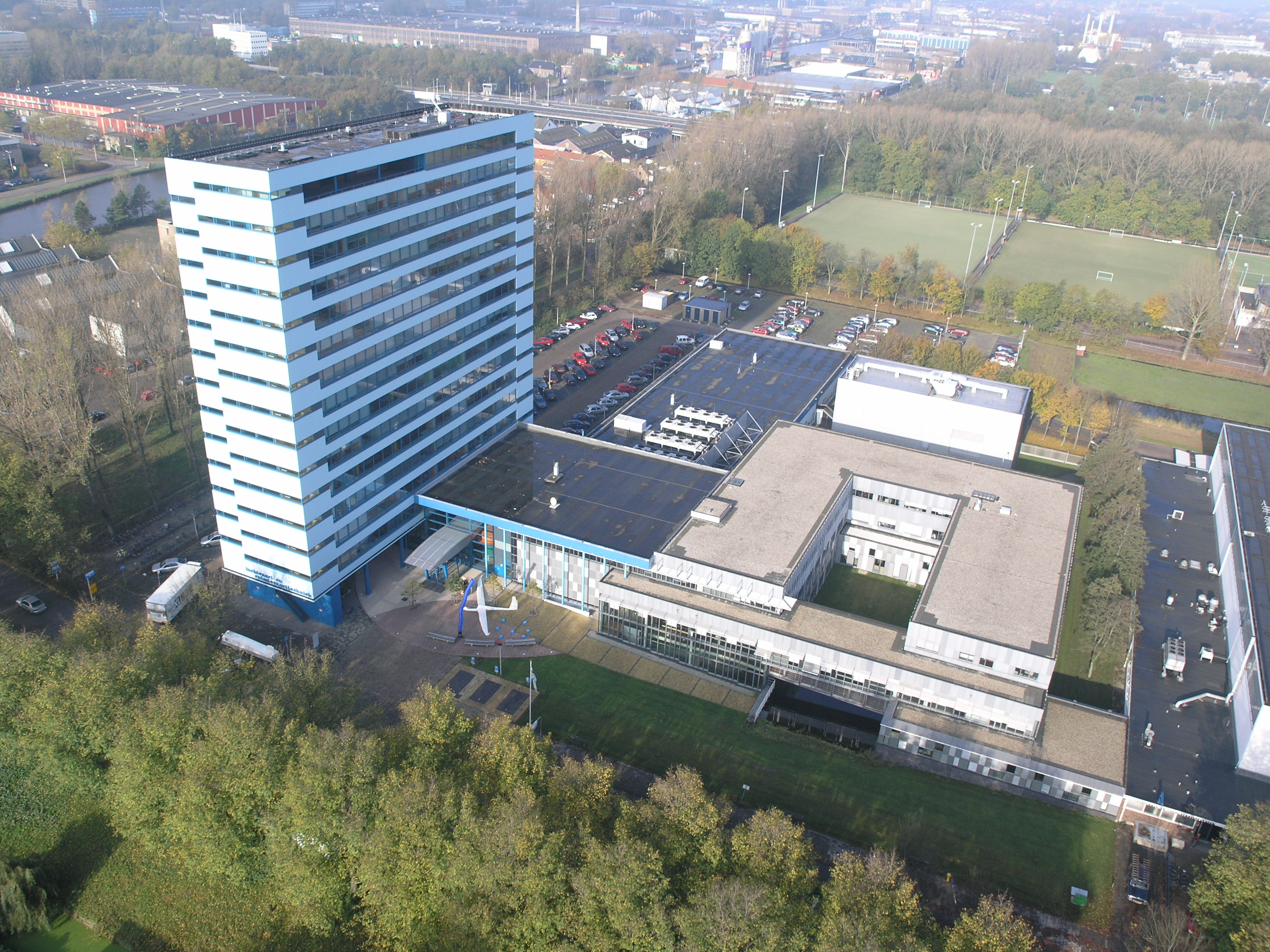
- The Faculty of Aerospace Engineering of the Delft University of Technology as seen from the sky
- Other name: LR
- Type: Public
- Established: 1940 (as Department); 1975 (as Faculty)
- Dean: Prof.dr. H.G.C. (Henri) Werij
- Location: Delft, South Holland, Netherlands
- Website: www.tudelft.nl/lr/

The Faculty of Aerospace Engineering at the Delft University of Technology in the Netherlands is the merger of two interrelated disciplines, aeronautical engineering and astronautical engineering. Aeronautical engineering works specifically with aircraft or aeronautics. Astronautical engineering works specifically with spacecraft or astronautics. At the Faculty of Aerospace Engineering, both of the fields are directly addressed along with expansion into fields such as wind energy.

== Description ==
The Faculty is one of the largest of the eight faculties at TU Delft and one of the largest faculties devoted entirely to aerospace engineering in northern Europe. It is the only institute carrying out research and education directly related to aerospace engineering in the Netherlands. Through the years, the Faculty has responded to the increasing demands of the aerospace industry by further expanding its facilities and laboratories. Today the Faculty has a student body of approximately 2300 undergraduates and graduates, 237 members of academic staff and 181 PhD students. Around 34% of the student population is from outside the Netherlands.
The TU Delft scored 15th in the world in the 2013 "Engineering and Technology" QS World University Rankings. In 2023 the TU Delft reached the 3rd place in the "Mechanical, aerospace and Manufacturing Engineering" category of the QS World University Rankings. In 2013 this category got extended to "Mechanical, Aeronautical & Manufacturing Engineering" and the TU Delft jumped to the 18th position worldwide (6th place in Europe). In 2017, TU Delft ranked 4th worldwide, and 1st within Europe, in the subject of Aerospace Engineering in the Shanghai Ranking's Global Ranking of Academic Subjects. As of 2022, TU Delft ranks 8th worldwide, and 1st within Europe, in the subject of Aerospace Engineering in Shanghai Ranking's Global Ranking of Academic Subjects.

== Research ==
Current areas of research include novel aerospace materials, Particle Image Velocimetry, CubeSat, Airborne Wind Energy and several others. Currently ten research chairs are grouped under four major departments:

- Flow Physics and Technology (FPT)
- Control and Operations (C&O)
- Aerospace Structures and Materials (ASM)
- Space Engineering (SpE)

== Facilities ==
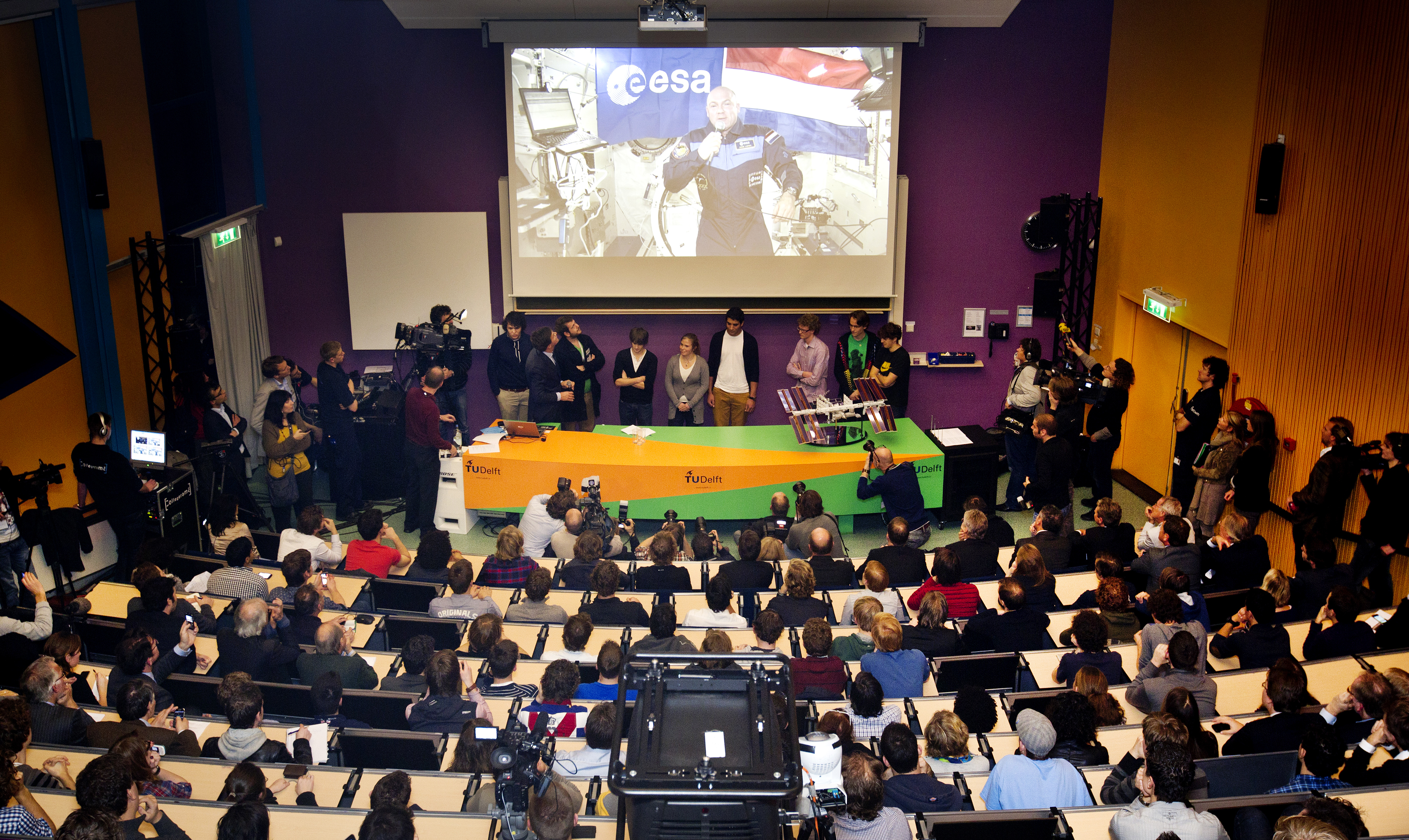
Live video connection between astronaut André Kuipers and the students, in the presence of Dutch Prime Minister Mark Rutte and Belgian astronaut Frank De Winne

Extensive laboratory and testing facilities are used in research and teaching. The facilities include supersonic, hypersonic and subsonic wind-tunnels, a high-sensitivity navigation simulator, a structures and materials testing laboratory, and an ISO 8, class 100,000 clean room for the development of micro satellites. These facilities make it possible to conduct experiments in man-machine factors, flight control, structures and materials, aerodynamics, simulation, motion, navigation and spaceflight. The faculty owns and makes use of a Cessna Citation jet aeroplane which is a unique flying laboratory. The Citation is used in research as well as in education. Its modular interior enables the possibility to change quickly between research missions and educational flights with students.

=== Delft Aerospace Structures and Materials laboratory ===
The Delft Aerospace Structures and Materials laboratory is one of the largest facilities of the faculty of aerospace engineering with a footprint of over 3600 square meters. The laboratory is split up in multiple smaller laboratories which allow for a wide variety of research and educational activities. Amongst others the facility consists of labs for the production, handling and testing of composites, facilities suitable for performing mechanical tests, a chemical lab, a micro UAV testing and development facility and work spaces for students to manufacture and test parts that they designed during their studies. The Delft Aerospace Structures and Materials laboratory is also the home of a large collection of aircraft and spacecraft (parts), including a retired F16 of the Dutch air force, which are used for educational purposes. Furthermore the laboratory also houses the Aircraft Manufacturing Laboratory, which is a laboratory where graduate students of the faculty are building a fully functional RV12 aircraft.

=== Simona ===
The flight simulator Simona can be programmed to simulate any known aircraft, but also to mimic characteristics of a new design. The unique light design allows extremely realistic motion. The simulator is used for research, but is also the subject of some M.Sc. thesis projects.

=== Clean room ===
The eight floor of the faculty houses an ISO 8, class 100,000 cleanroom for the development of micro satellites. The facility is used both by staff and by graduate students from the space department of the faculty. The cleanroom is used for space related research and for the production of TU Delft's micro satellites, of which three are currently in orbit around the Earth: Delfi-C3, Delfi-n3Xt and Delfi-PQ. Contact with these satellites is maintained through a ground station housed on campus at the faculty of electrical engineering, computer science and mathematics.

== National and international cooperation ==
The faculty plays a significant role in national organisations such as the Royal Netherlands Aerospace Centre, the Netherlands Space Agency and the Netherlands Organisation for Applied Scientific Research. Collaborations with numerous international and multinational industries through research groups abroad as well as in the Netherlands ensure that the Faculty remains at the forefront of the latest developments in the aerospace industry. The faculty is a member of PEGASUS, the European network of prestigious aerospace universities. It also participates in exchanges of students and lecturers through the SOCRATES/ERASMUS programmes and agreements between several other partner universities. The faculty plays a major role in the IDEA League (TU Delft, ETH Zurich, RWTH Aachen, Chalmers institutes and universities).

== Related pages ==
- Delft Flying-V
