= Hand-pollination =

Mechanical pollination technique

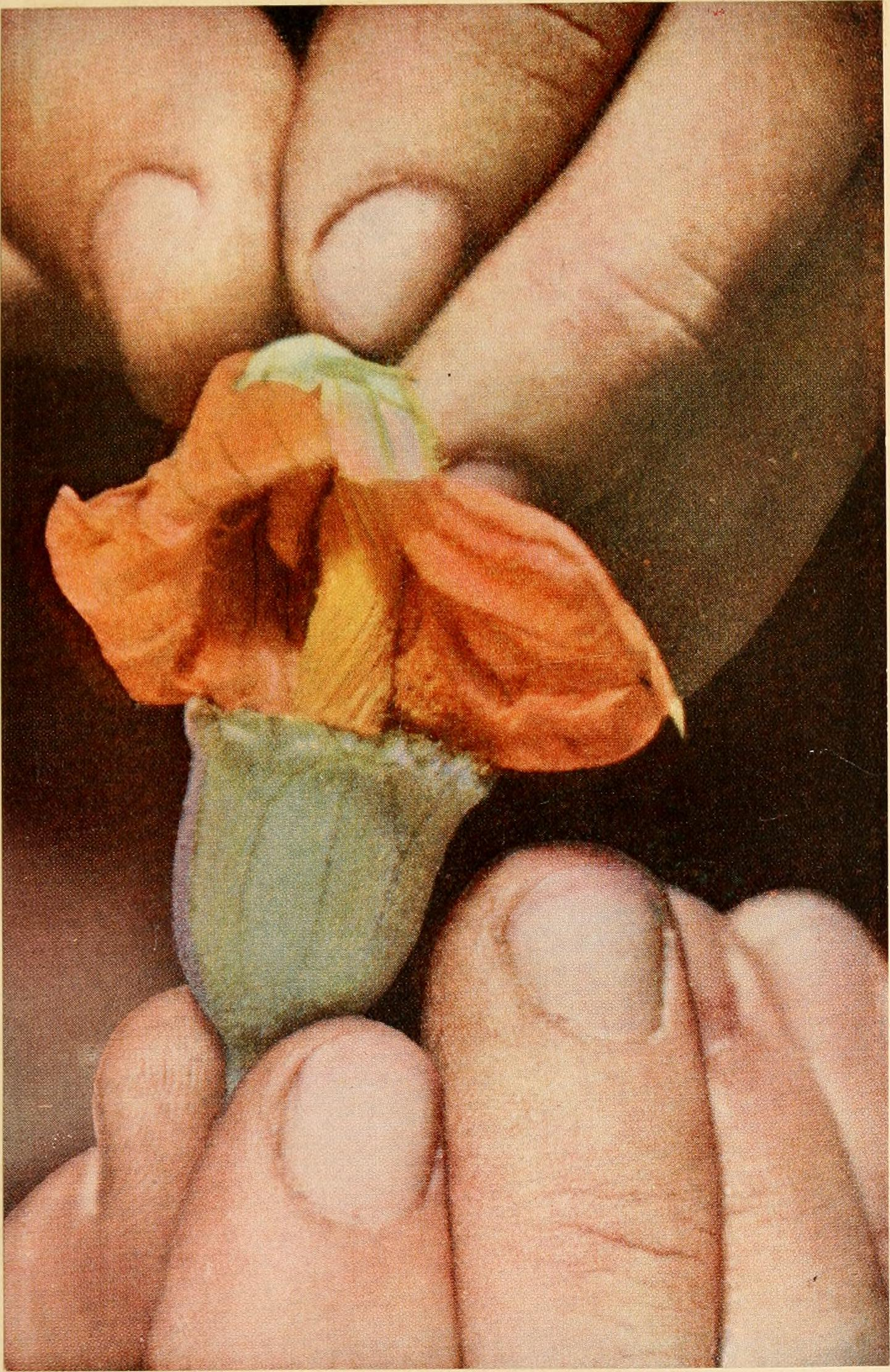
Hand-pollination of two gourd blossoms

Hand-pollination, also known as mechanical pollination, is a technique that can be used to pollinate plants when natural or open pollination is either undesirable or insufficient.

== Method ==
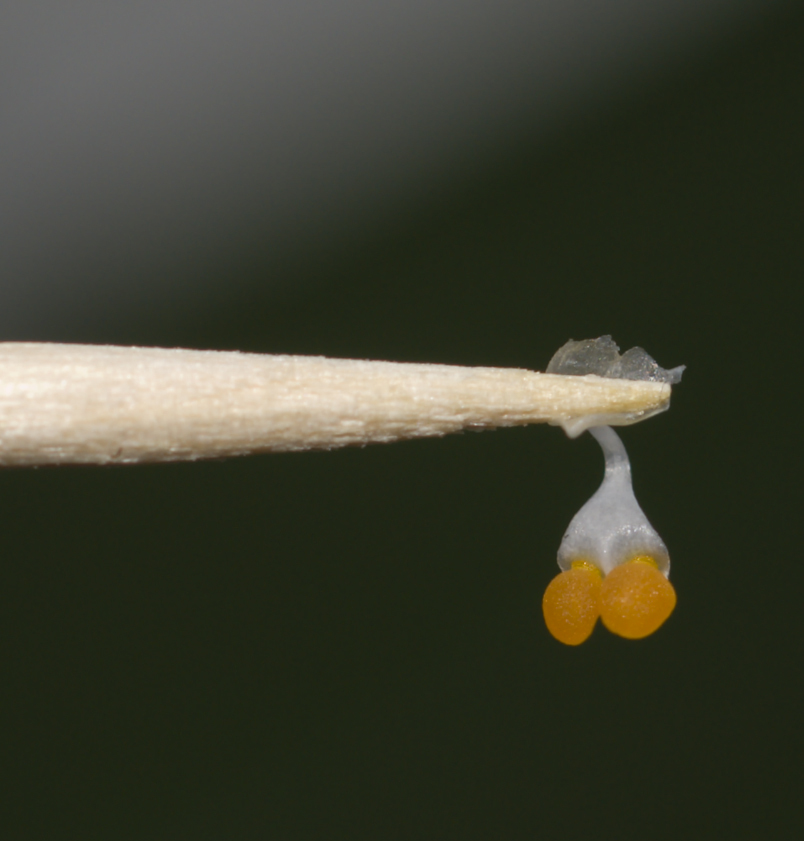
Phalaenopsis pollinia (orange) attached to a toothpick with its sticky viscidium

This method of pollination is done by manually transferring pollen from the stamen of one plant to the pistil of another. The plant the pollen is taken from is called the pollen donor or pollen parent, while the plant receiving the pollen is the seed parent. Hand-pollination is often done with a cotton swab or small brush, but can also be done by removing the petals from a male flower and brushing it against the stigmas of female flowers, or by simply shaking flowers in the case of bisexual flowers, such as tomatoes. A special case are plants where the pollen are condensed in a mass called the pollinium, such as in orchids. In this case a small utensil is used to which the pollinia will stick.

== Reasons ==
Common reasons for choosing this method include the lack of pollinators, keeping control of cross-pollination between varieties grown together, and creating specific hybrids.

Examples of this are vanilla plants, which are transported to areas where its natural pollinators do not exist, or plants grown in greenhouses, urban areas, or with a cover to control pests, where natural pollinators cannot reach them. Pollinator decline and the concentrated pollination needs of monoculture can also be a factor.

However, these are not the only reasons, and variable techniques for hand-pollination have arisen for many specialty crops. For instance, hand-pollination is used with date palms to avoid wasting space and energy growing sufficient male plants for adequate natural pollination. Because of the level of labor involved, hand-pollination is only an option on a small scale, used chiefly by small market gardeners and owners of individual plants. On large-scale operations, such as field crops, orchards, or commercial seed production, honeybees or other pollinators are a more efficient approach to pollination management.

Despite this, hand-pollination is a fairly widespread practice. Pears grown in Hanyuan County, China have been hand-pollinated since the 1980s, because they can't be pollinated with other varieties that have different flowering times; also, lice infestation requires the use of many insecticide sprays, which causes local beekeepers to refuse to lend beehives.

== List of species ==
- Phalaenopsis (moth orchids)
- Phoenix dactylifera (date palms)

== See also ==
- RoboBee
- Materially Engineered Artificial Pollinators
