= Persico Marine =

Italian yacht and boat builder

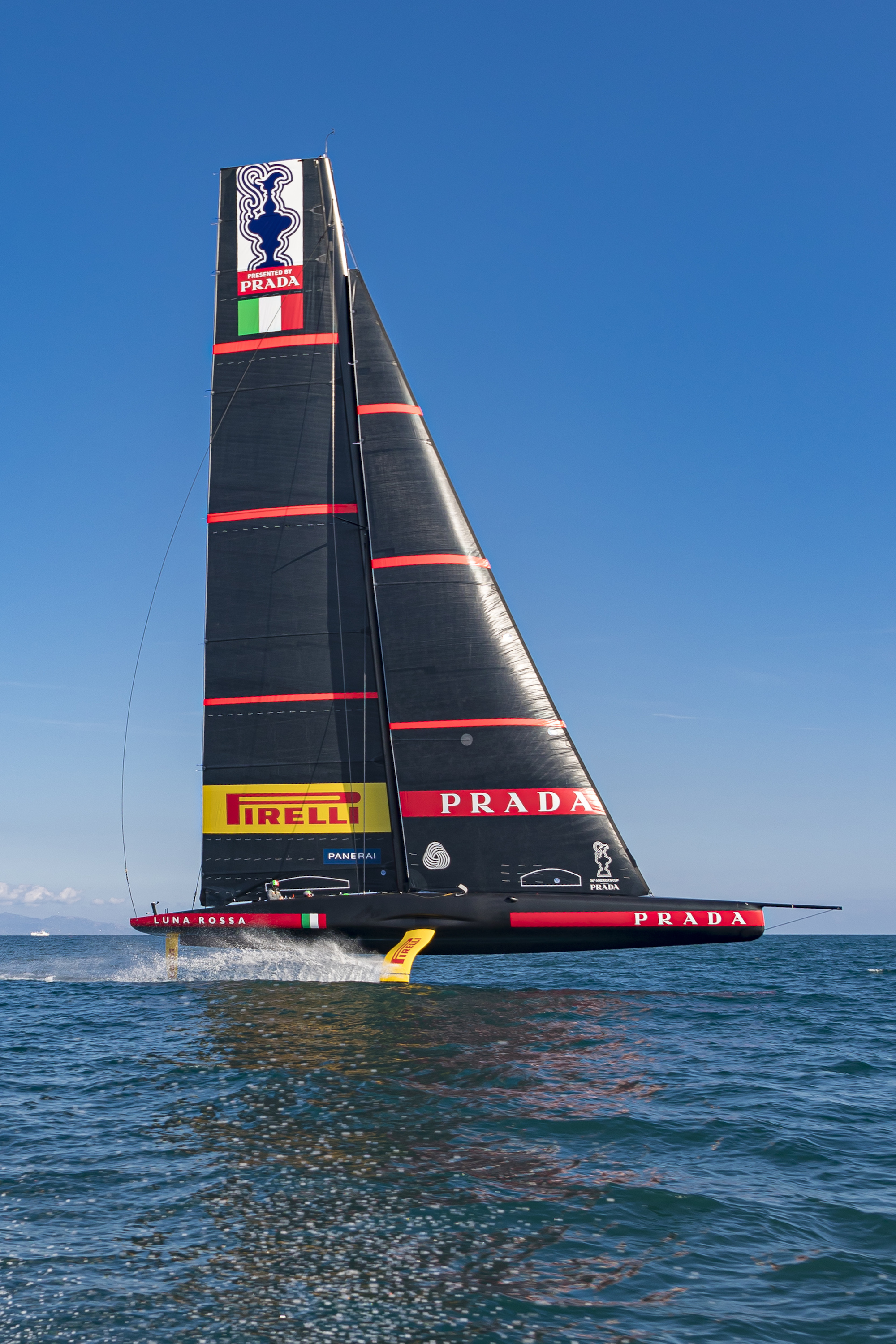
- Company type: Private
- Industry: Sailing yacht design and construction
- Headquarters: Nembro and La Spezia, Italy
- Products: Sailing yachts
- Services: design and boatbuilding
- Website: persicomarine.com

Persico Marine is a privately held yacht design and boat builder based in Nembro, Lombardy, and in Marina di Carrara, Tuscany, Italy. Established in 1990, the company builds custom sailing yachts for both racing teams and individual customers. Persico Marine is a part of the Persico Group, an Italian multinational engaged in the automotive, industrial, marine and aerospace industries.

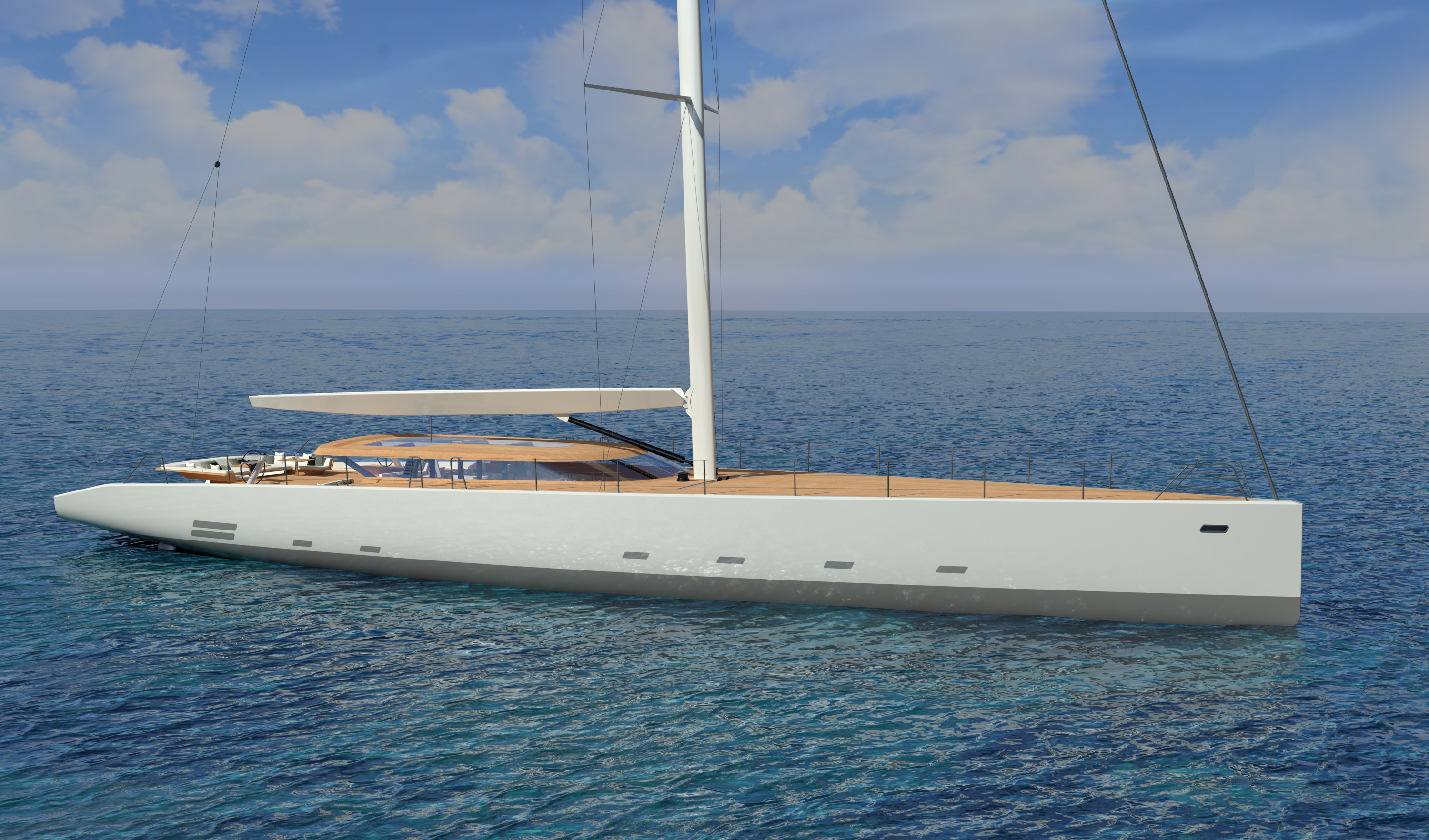
"Wally 145" by Persico Marine

Persico Marine has worked on racing yachts for the America's Cup, the Volvo Ocean Race and the Maxi 72 class, amongst others.

With financial backing from Prada and Pirelli Persico Marine constructed two carbon fiber AC75 monohulls for team Luna Rossa used at the 2021 America's Cup held in Auckland, Zealand. Persico Marine was also the official supplier of identical canting foil arms to all competing America’s Cup teams.

== See also ==
- IMOCA 60 Linkedout
- ClubSwan 80
- IMOCA 60 Stand As One
