= Juan Kouyoumdjian =

Argentine yacht designer

Juan Kouyoumdjian (born July 15, 1971), also known as Juan K, a naval architect specializing in designing racing sailboats. His designs have obtained 2 Olympic gold medals, 3 VOR Volvo Ocean Race wins, 7 World Championship titles, 9 offshore speed records, 6 America's Cup involvements, amongst other competitions.

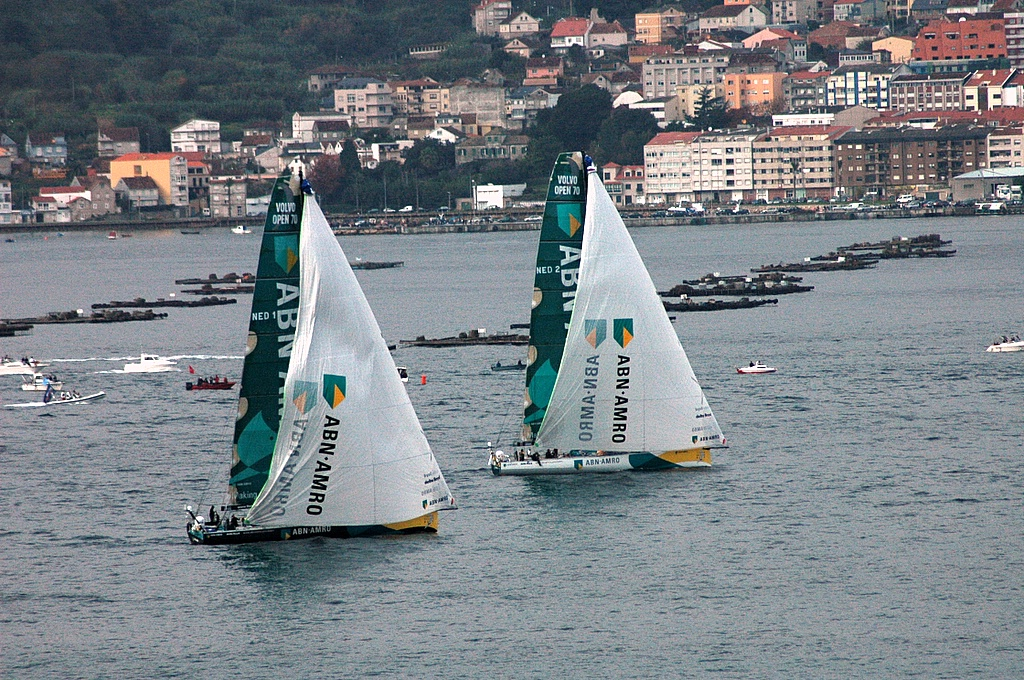
VOR 2005-2006 Winner VOR 70 ABN AMRO I, design by Juan K

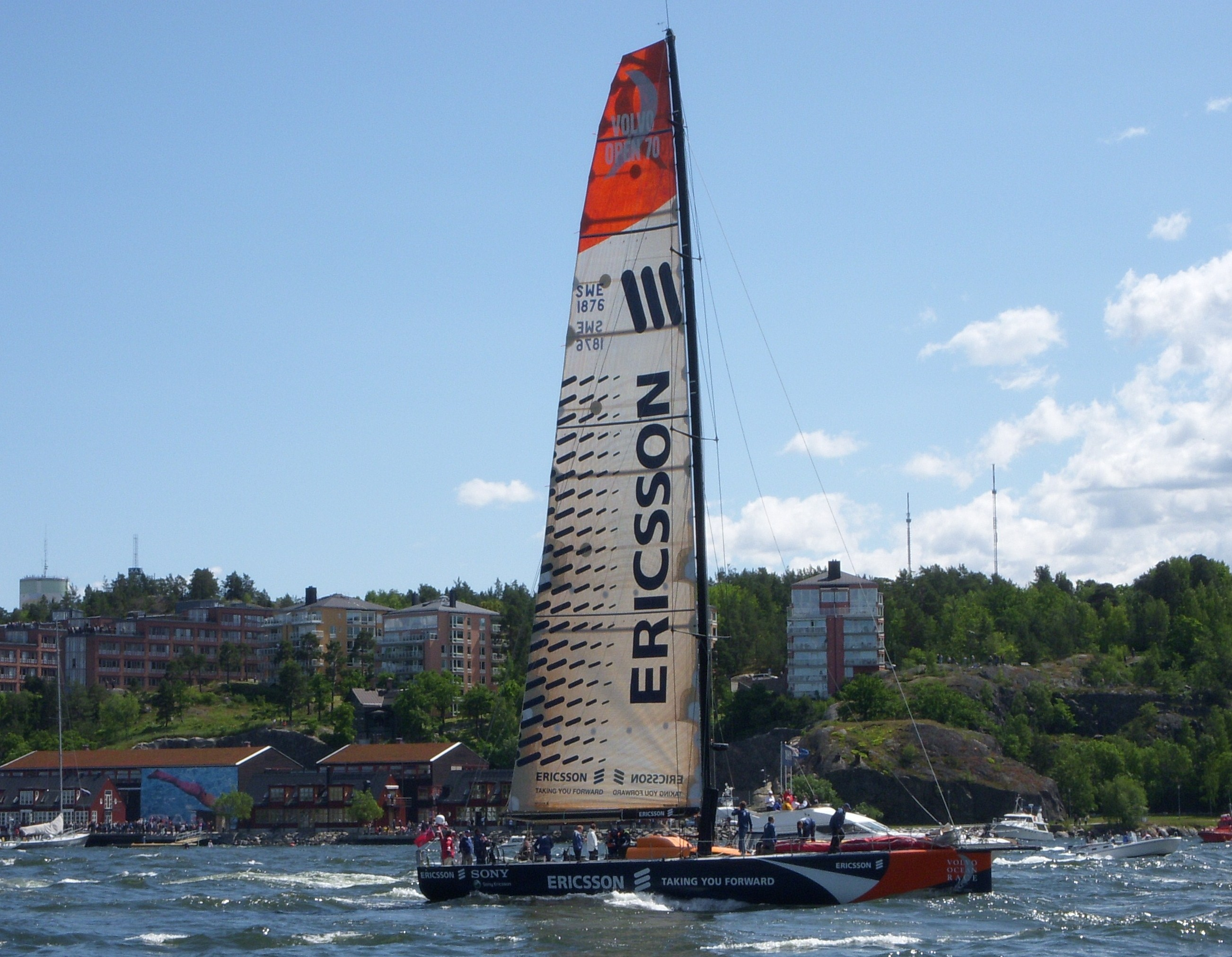
VOR 2008-2009 Winner VOR 70 Ericsson 4, Design by Juan K

He is responsible for numerous ocean racing yachts and regarded as one of the world's leading naval acrchitects. Juan K's most notable creations are MAXI 88 Rambler 88, VOR 2005-2006 winner VOR 70 ¨ABN AMRO I¨, VOR 2008-2009 winner VOR 70 ¨Ericsson 4¨, Rolex Sydney Hobart 2023 winner LawConnect, VOR 2011-12 winner VOR 70 ¨Groupama 4¨, ClubSwan 36, ClubSwan 43. ClubSwan 50, ClubSwan 80, the impressive ClubSwan 125 superyacht The Beast. IMOCA 60 Cheminees Poujoulat, IMOCA 60 Corum IMOCA 60 Paprec 5, IMOCA 60 Pindar 2 and LawConnect, amongst others.

== Early life and career ==
Kouyoumdjian began sailing at an early age with his father and twin brother, with whom he sailed during his first 17 years in Buenos Aires, Argentina. At the age of 17, he moved to the United Kingdom and began his Naval Engineering studies at the renown University of Southampton, where he earned an engineering degree in ship science, specializing in Yacht and Small Craft. During his studies, he did an internship with the naval architect Philippe Briand in La Rochelle. Upon graduating, in June 1993 he went on to work for Briand for two years, during which he was given the opportunity to work on the French challenger for the 29th edition of the America’s Cup. He founded his own studio, Juan Yacht Design, in 1997.

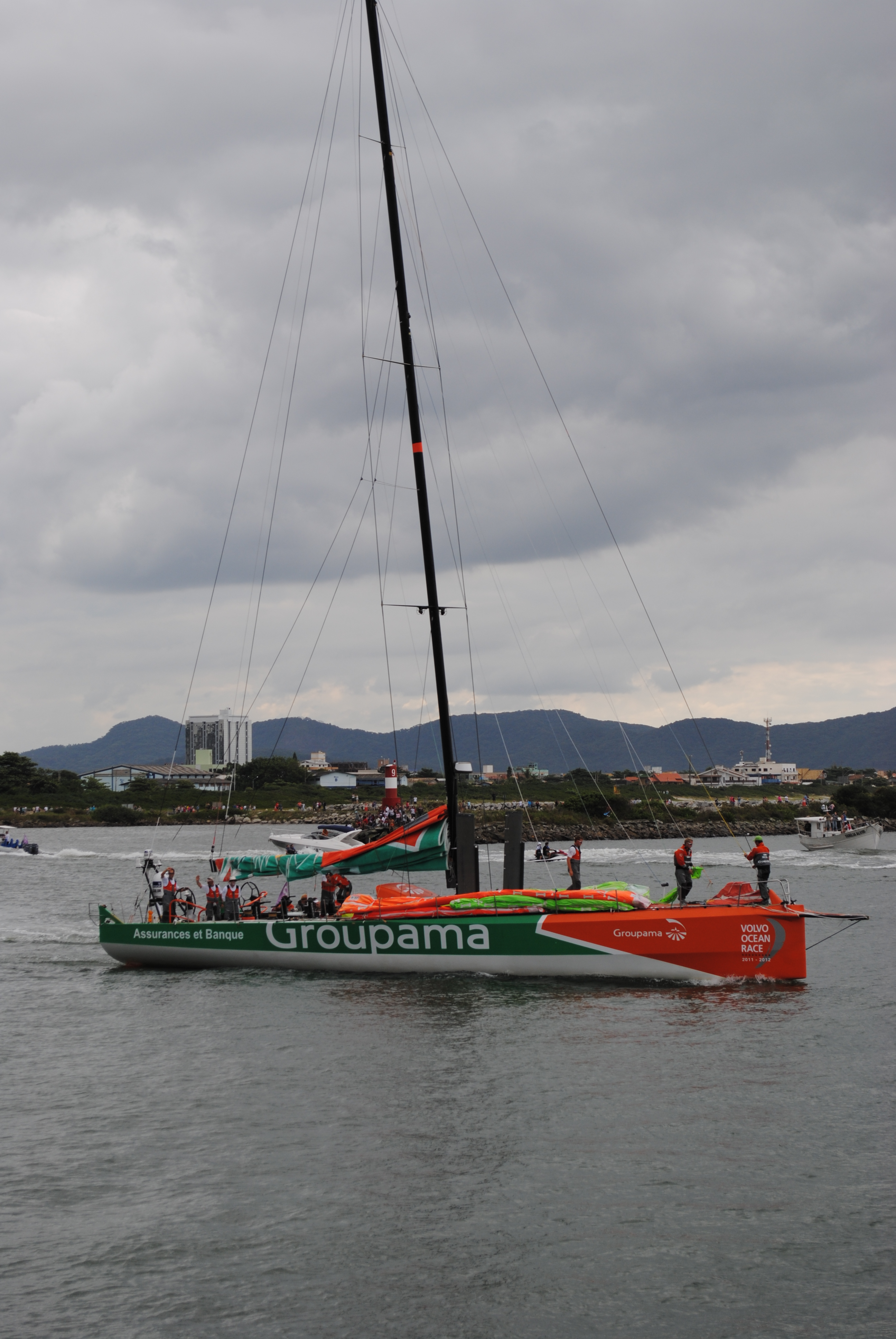
VOR 2011-2012 Winner VOR 70 Groupama 4, design by Juan K.

== Design style ==
Antonio Vettese of Yacht Design magazine stated that Juan K tried to push yacht design towards a new frontier. As cited in 2010 by Starclass.org, the first race in 2005–06 VO70s really brought Juan K´s design style to global prominence. Juan K's concepts became the benchmark for the VO70 – very wide, powerful stern sections, a hard chine aft and twin rudders.

Kouyoumdjian has invested heavily in developing his own CFD capability since he started out, and he has endeavoured to retain that advantage ever since. In regards to ABN Amro I, the 2005/2006 Volvo Ocean Race winner by a wide margin, he said: “Before the start of the race there was some mistrust because that boat was very different from other yachts that had dominated the scene until then. It had, for example, twin rudders.”His innovations led to the nickname, “the Picasso of the Sea”.

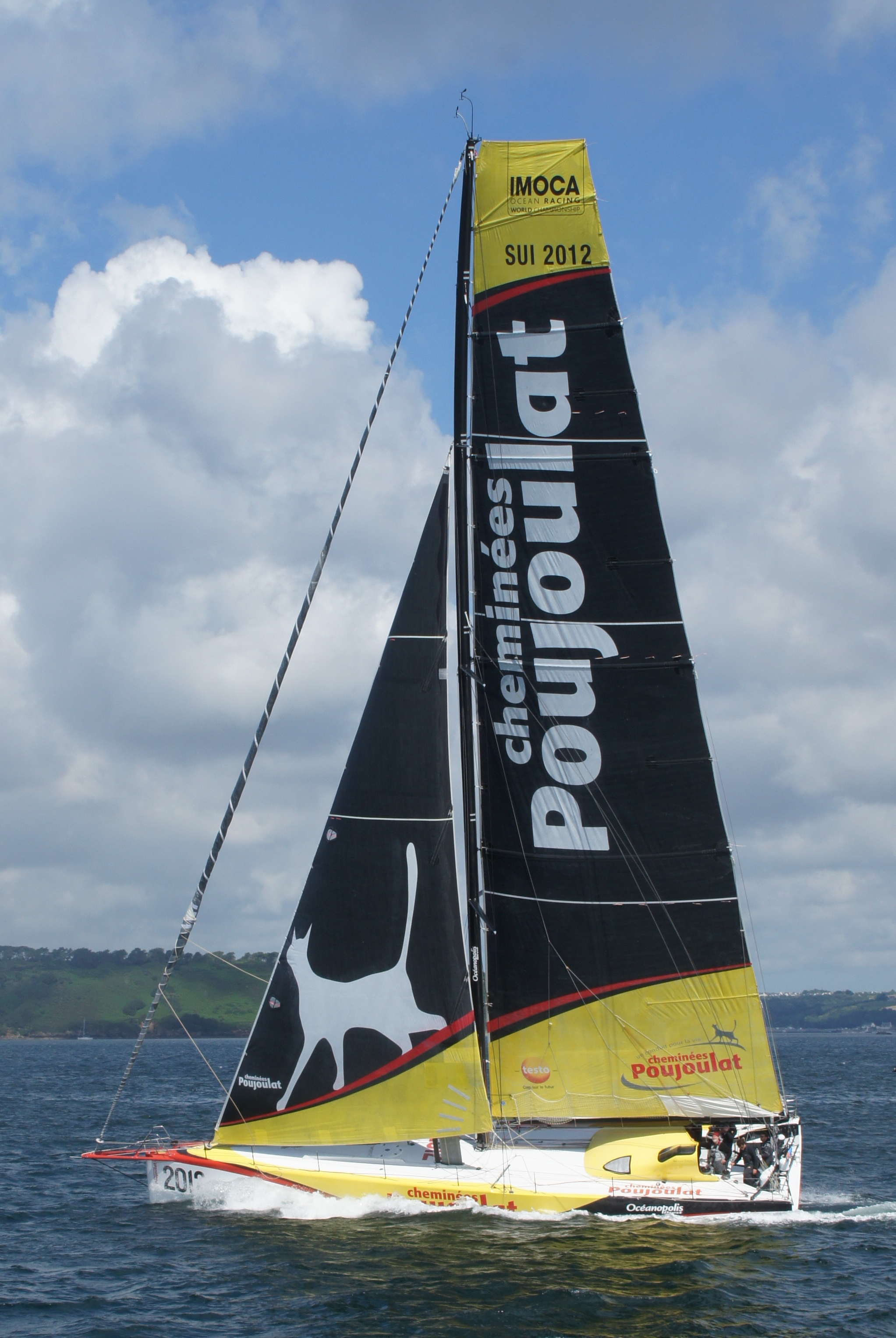
IMOCA 60 Cheminees Poujoiulat, 2011, design by Juan K.

In 2017, the emeritus king of Spain Juan Carlos I premiered a new 6-meter fiberglass vessel called Bribón XVII, where Kouyoumdjian was in charge of the geometry design: shapes of the hull, keel and rudder. In September 2023 Bribón XVII, with the King Emeritus on board, was proclaimed world champion. The boat, from the Real Club Náutico de Sanxenxo, achieved its third world title in the 6 Meter class on the Isle of Wight.

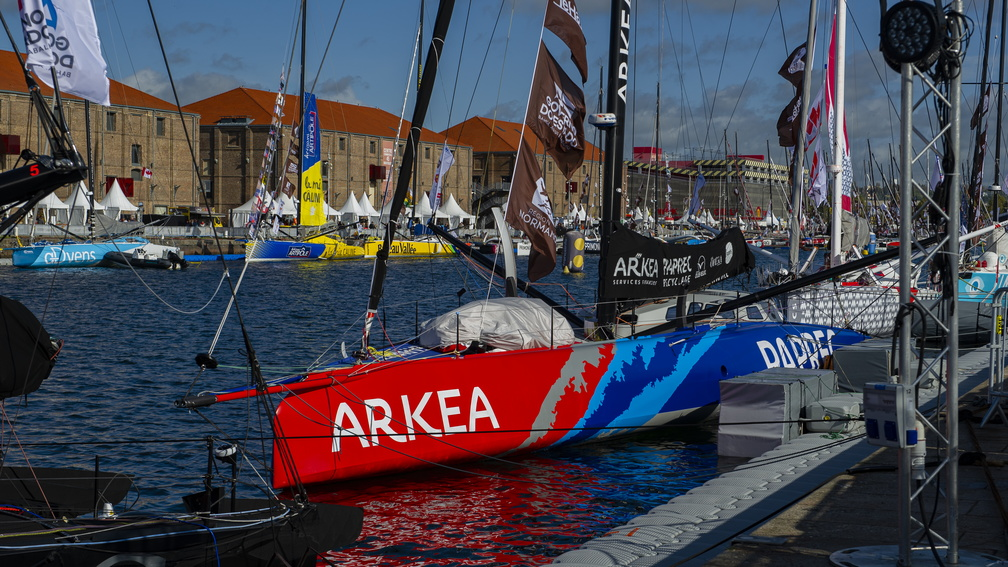
IMOCA 60 Paprec 5, 2019, design by Juan K.

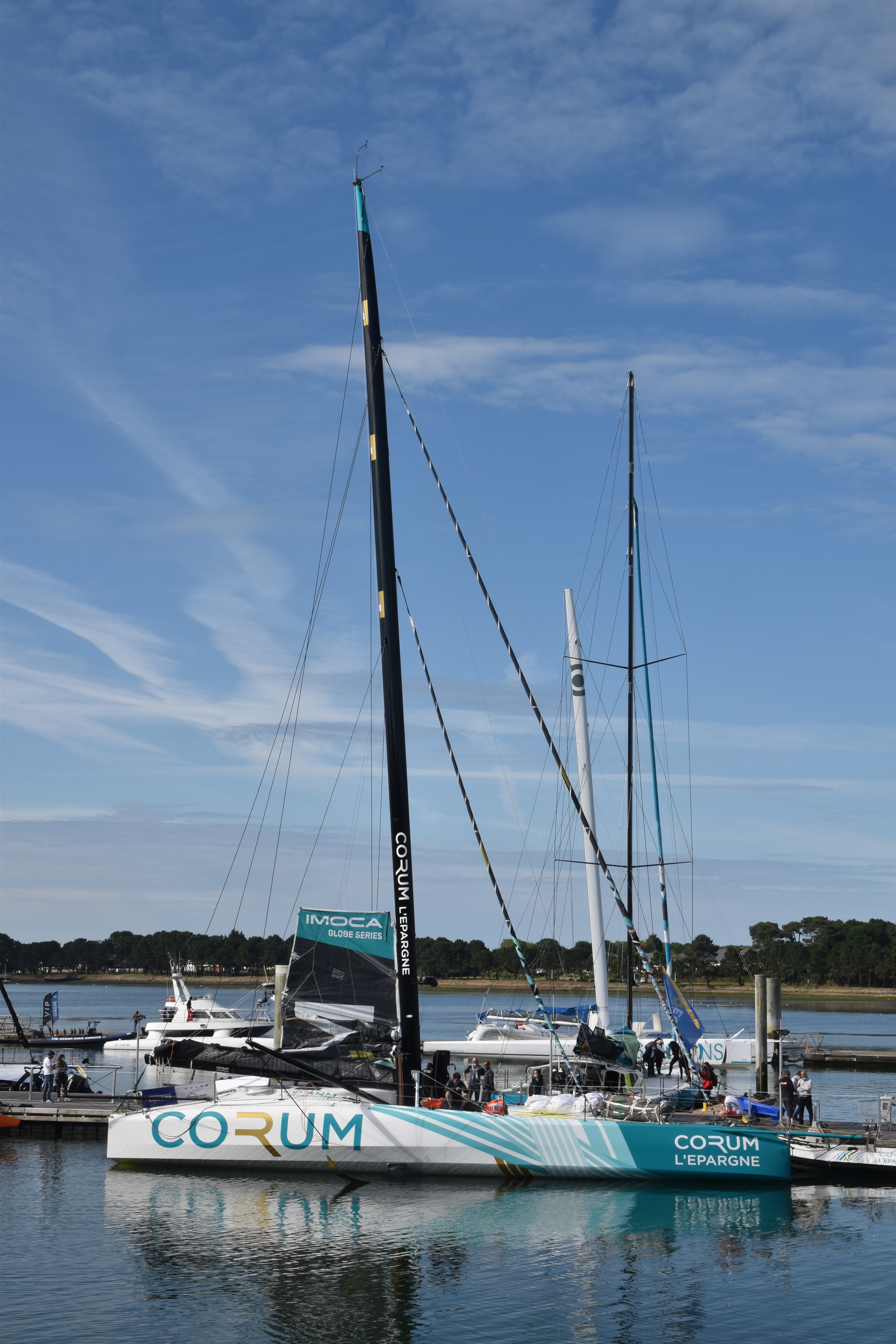
IMOCA 60 CORUM, 2020, design by Juan K.

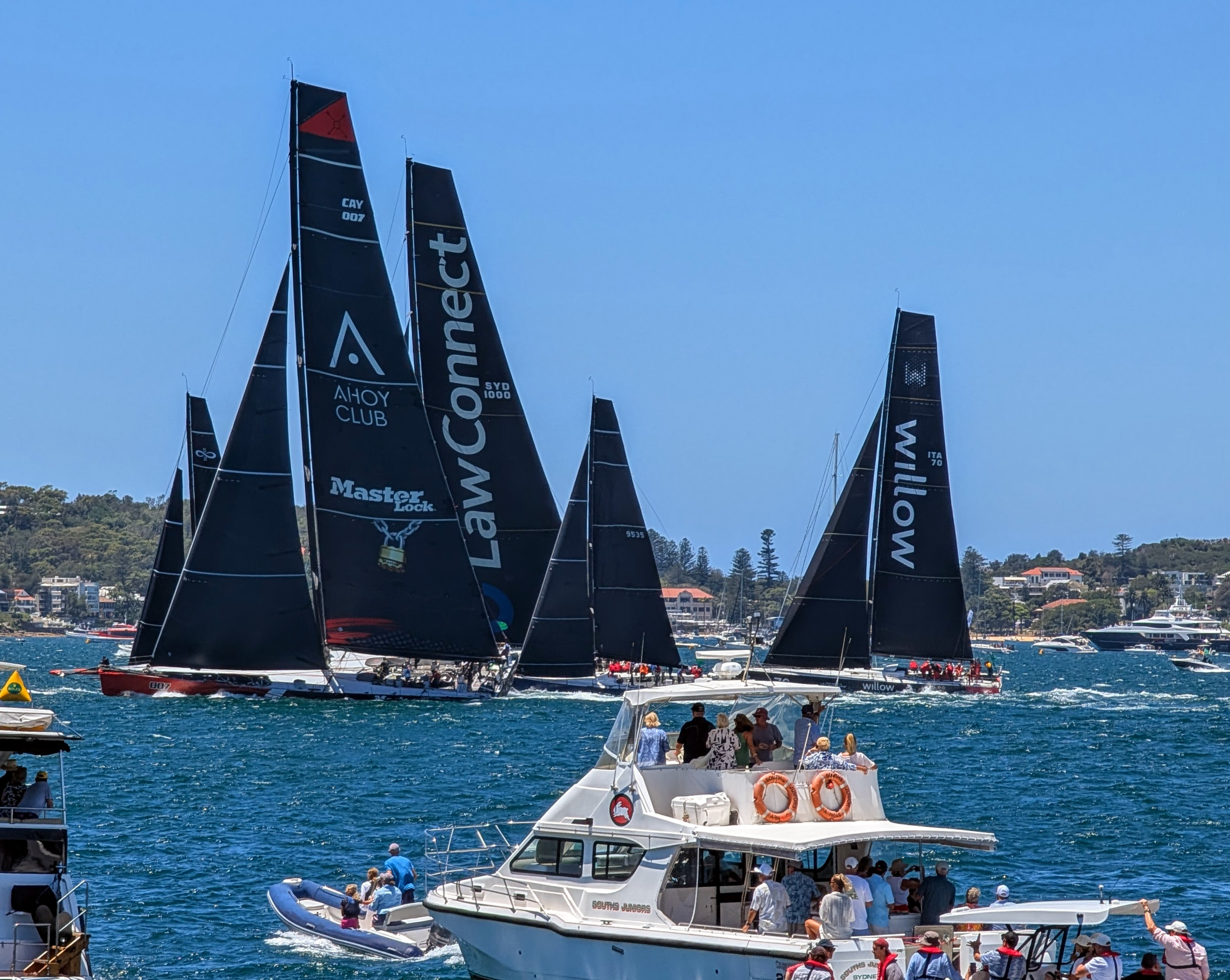
MAXI 100 Rolex Sydney Hobart 2023 winner LawConnect, design by Juan K.

== Awards ==
Juan K has the record for the Seahorse Sailor of the Month award with two wins in March 2006, and September 2009.

In 2012, Juan K got awarded the Ericsson Trophy recognizing the importance of technology and design in the world of sport.

In 2023, Juan K won the prestigious Boat International Design & Innovation Award (Boat International Media) both for best interior design and best naval architecture.
