= Delft Flying-V =

Concept airplane

The Flying-V is a proposed airliner of flying wing configuration, being studied by researchers at Delft University of Technology in the Netherlands. The aircraft is designed to be highly energy-efficient over long distances.

== History ==
The Flying-V was conceived by Justus Benad in 2014 during his thesis project at Airbus Hamburg. KLM has backed this plane. In July 2020, the scaled flight model of the Flying-V made its first test flights.

== Design ==
The passenger cabin, cargo hold and fuel tanks are integrated into the aircraft's wing structure. Because of this unique design, the engineers claim that it will be about 20% more efficient than the Airbus A350-900.

The proposed dimensions of the Flying-V are:

- 55 meters in length
- 65 meter wingspan
- 17 meters tall
- 314 passengers
- 140000 liters of kerosene
- 160 cubic meters
- Uses 20% less fuel compared to the Airbus A350-900
