= ClubSwan 36 =

2018 one-design racing keelboat

Development
- Designer: Juan Kouyoumdjian
- Location: Finland
- Year: 2018
- Builder: Oy Nautor AB
- Role: Racer
- Name: ClubSwan 36

Boat
- Displacement: 6,923 lb (3,140 kg)
- Draft: 9.02 ft (2.75 m)

Hull
- Type: monohull
- Construction: glassfibre
- LOA: 36.09 ft (11.00 m)
- LWL: 34.74 ft (10.59 m)
- Beam: 11.81 ft (3.60 m)
- Engine: Nanni Industries 14 hp (10 kW) diesel engine

Hull appendages
- Keel: Fin keel with weighted bulb
- Ballast: 2,564 lb (1,163 kg)
- Rudder: Dual spade-type rudders

Rig
- Rig type: Bermuda rig
- I foretriangle height: 43.01 ft (13.11 m)
- J foretriangle base: 15.65 ft (4.77 m)
- P mainsail luff: 49.21 ft (15.00 m)
- E mainsail foot: 19.03 ft (5.80 m)

Sails
- Sailplan: Fractional rigged sloop
- Mainsail area: 635 sq ft (59.0 m^{2})
- Jib/genoa area: 361 sq ft (33.5 m^{2})
- Gennaker area: 1,422 sq ft (132.1 m^{2})
- Upwind sail area: 996 sq ft (92.5 m^{2})
- Downwind sail area: 2,057 sq ft (191.1 m^{2})

The ClubSwan 36 is a Finnish sailboat that was designed by Juan Kouyoumdjian as a one design racer and first built in 2018. Giovanni Belgrano was the principal engineer and aerodynamic expert, while Hervé Devaux designed the rig.

== Production ==
The design has been built by Oy Nautor AB in Finland, since 2018. It was first publicly shown in Scarlino, Italy on 3 May 2018. As of 2023 it remains in production.

== Design ==
The ClubSwan 36 is a racing keelboat, built predominantly of glassfibre, with infused E-glass epoxy corecell foam with carbon fibre reinforcement on the keel grid and also in the lateral bulkhead. It has a fractional sloop rig, with a deck-stepped mast, one set of swept spreaders and carbon fibre spars, including a retractable carbon fibre bowsprit. The standing rigging is made from rod. The hull has a reverse stem; an open plumb transom; dual internally mounted spade-type rudders controlled by a tiller with an extension and a very high aspect ratio fixed, fin, steel keel with a weighted lead bulb. It also has a single, movable C-shaped hydrofoil which allows negative leeway to be achieved. It displaces 6,923 lb (3,140 kg) and carries 2,564 lb (1,163 kg) of ballast.

The boat has a draft of 9.02 ft (2.75 m) with the standard keel. It is equipped with seven Harken winches, two for the runners, two for the mainsail and two for the jib or spinnaker. The seventh winch is centrally located forward to control the C-shaped hydrofoil, the halyards and the other lines.

The boat is fitted with a French Nanni Industries diesel engine of 14 hp (10 kW) with a retractable drive shaft and three-bladed fixed prop, for docking and manoeuvring. The fuel tank holds 11 U.S. gallons (42 L; 9.2 imp gal). A 14 hp (10 kW) Torquedo electric motor driven by a BMW battery is optional.

The design has a minimalist interior without specific crew accommodations. The manufacturer terms it a "Protected Shelter ... a dry space to rest between races or during longer delivery."

For sailing downwind the design may be equipped with an asymmetrical spinnaker of 1,422 sq ft (132.1 m^{2}), flown from the bowsprit.

The design has a hull speed of 7.90 kn (14.63 km/h), although it can exceed 20 kn (37 km/h) while planing.

The one design class rules limit the crew to seven people, the number professional crew members to three people and crew weight to 1,124 lb (510 kg). It also limits the sails carried to five: one mainsail, two jibs and two spinnakers.

== Operational history ==
The boat has been sailed as part of the ClubSwan Racing season and also the Nations League 2023 for the Nations Trophy, as well as it own class European championships.

In a 2018 review, Scuttlebutt Sailing News reported, "the ClubSwan 36 is more than just a new boat. It is a statement. Fusing the best attributes of dinghy and keelboat sailing with the exhilaration of foil assistance makes this yacht the most innovative entry-level one design sports boat of its era."

In a 2020 review for Yachting World, Matthew Sheahan wrote, "designed as a high-performance one design, its hull and deck lines are in keeping with some of the more radical styles out there among boats like the Fast 40+ Rán VII and more recently Alex Thomson's IMOCA 60 Hugo Boss."
