= Materially engineered artificial pollinators =

Experimental radiowave-controlled micro-drones

Materially engineered artificial pollinators are experimental radiowave-controlled micro-drones that use ionic liquid gels for artificial pollination without living insects.

The researchers who are developing this technology published their findings in the 9 February issue of the journal Chem and hope that their research will help counter the problems caused by declining honeybee populations, meeting the modern agricultural demands of colonies and benefit farmers.

== Early history ==
In 2007 Eijiro Miyako, chemist at the National Institute of Advanced Industrial Science and Technology (AIST) Nanomaterial Research Institute, worked to make liquids that could be used as electrical conductors. One of his attempts generated a sticky gel, which was at the time considered a failure. After 8 years this gel was found during a lab cleanup. The researchers were astonished that it had not degraded, retaining its viscosity. Svetlana Chechetka, colleague of Miyako, notes that "conventional gels are mainly made of water and can't be used for a long time, so we decided to use this material for research". Inspired by concerns over honeybees and news reports on robotic insects, Miyako decided to investigate whether the gel could be used to pick up pollen. Miyako collected ants from near his institute, placed a droplet of the gel on some of them and let them wander around for a while in a box of tulips. The ants with the gel on them had more pollen than those without. Separate feet experiments with houseflies discovered a different phenomenon: the gel produces a camouflage effect, changing colour in response to various light sources, which could be used to help artificial pollinators avoid predators.

== Drone tests ==
After these early insect successes, Miyako wanted to move on to drones. He settled on a smaller model that could fly around through flower fields the way a bee does, and simulated the bee's hairy skin by using horse hair coated with the gel. The team flew the 4 × 4 cm sized mechanical bees over pink-leaved Japanese lilies (Lilium japonicum), letting them absorb the pollen. The drones were then flown to a second flower, where grains were deposited to artificially pollinate the plants, causing them to begin the process of generating seeds. This did not occur with control drones (without the gel and hair).

Miyako states that "the findings, which will have applications for agriculture and robotics, among others, could lead to the development of artificial pollinators and help counter the problems caused by declining honeybee populations", that they "believe that robotic pollinators could be trained to learn pollination paths using global positioning systems and artificial intelligence" and that the concept demonstrated "should be expandable to other research areas, including chemical composites, agriculture, biomimetic science, and robotics".

== See also ==
- RoboBee
- Pollinator decline
- Technological fix
