= Fin keel =

The fin keel is a stationary foil positioned amidships and projecting downwards under the hull of a sailing vessel. A fin keel is relatively short in a fore-aft direction, and relatively deep, located near the center of the boat. A fin keel is a fixed element, unlike a centerboard, which is retractable. The design purpose of the fin keel is to provide lateral resistance to wind forces applied to the boat via the sails and to facilitate the placement of ballast below the hull while presenting less wetted surface area than a full keel, which helps to reduce drag and leeway. The fin keel was invented by James Brown Herreshoff (1834–1930).
