= Waterline length =

Size of a ship

LOA (length overall) & LWL (length at the waterline)

Detailed hull dimensions

A vessel's length at the waterline (abbreviated to L.W.L) is the length of a ship or boat at the level where it sits in the water (the waterline). The LWL will be shorter than the length of the boat overall (length overall or LOA) as most boats have bows and stern protrusions that make the LOA greater than the LWL. As a ship becomes more loaded, it will sit lower in the water and its ambient waterline length may change; but the registered L.W.L is measured from a default load condition.

== Measurement ==
This measure is significant in determining several of a vessel's properties, such as how much water it displaces, where the bow and stern waves occur, hull speed, amount of bottom-paint needed, etc. Traditionally, a stripe called the "boot top" is painted around the hull just above the waterline.

Greater beam and draft produces a larger wetted surface, thereby causing higher hull drag. In particular, any "displacement" or non-planing boat requires much greater power to accelerate beyond its hull speed, which is determined by the length of the waterline, and can be calculated using the formula: Vmax (in knots) = square root of LWL (in feet) x 1.34. The hull speed is the speed at which the wavelength of the bow wave stretches out to the length of the waterline, thus dropping the boat into a hollow between the two waves. While small boats like canoes can overcome this effect fairly easily, heavier sailboats cannot.

== Usage history ==
Since waterline length provides a practical limit for the speed of a typical sailboat, traditional rules for racing sailboats often classed boats using waterline length as a principal measure. To get around this rule, designers in the early 20th century began building racing sailboats with long overhangs fore and aft. This resulted in a nominally shorter waterline, but when the boats were sailed they heeled over, pulling the sides of the overhangs into the water as well and creating a much longer effective waterline, and thereby achieving much greater speed. The first recorded use of a line (documented by New Jersey marine museum) is by the small and rather unknown naval fleet of Thomas Jefferson.

== See also ==
- Length between perpendiculars
