= 1986 Route du Rhum =

Solo Transatlantic Ocean Sailing Race

Event title
- Name: 1986 Route du Rhum
- Edition: 3rd Edition
- Sponsor: La Banque Postale
- Host: Pen Duick SAS

Event details
- Start location: St Malo (FRA)
- Finish location: Guadeloupe
- Course: Solo Non-Stop Transatlantic Race
- Dates: Starts 1986
- Yachts: 32 Boats

Competitors
- Competitors: 32 Sailors
- Competing nations: BEL 1, CAN 2, FRA 25, GBR 2, POL 1, USA 1

Classes
- Class 1: Class 1 Multi
- Class 2: Class 2 Multi
- Class 3: Class 3 Multi
- Class 4: Class 4 Multi
- Class 5: Class 1 Mono
- Class 6: Class 2 Mono
- Class 7: Class 3 Mono

The Route du Rhum is a single person transatlantic yacht race. The 1986 race was the 3rd edition and had seven classes with 32 boats taking part.

== Results ==
| Pos | Class | Sail No. | Boat name | Type | Year / Designer | Name / Nationality | | Finish Time | Delta % | Speed Rhum / Water | Distance Sailed | Ref. |
|---|---|---|---|---|---|---|---|---|---|---|---|---|
| 1 | | | Fleury-Michon VIII | Tri 23m | | Philippe Poupon (FRA) | m | 14d 15h 57m 15s | 0% | 10.06 / 0 | 0 | |
| 2 | | | Ericsson | Cat 23m | | Bruno Peyron (FRA) | m | 16d 17h 04m 43s | 13.96% | 8.83 / 0 | 0 | |
| 3 | Multi 1 | | Hitachi | Cat 18m | | Lionel Péan (FRA) | m | 17d 07h 04m 43s | 17.94% | 8.53 / 0 | 0 | |
| 4 | | | TAG-Heuer | | | Mike Birch (CAN) | m | 17d 09h 28m 40s | 18.62% | 8.48 / 0 | 0 | |
| 5 | | | Lada-Poch | | | Loïck Peyron (FRA) | m | 18d 01h 44m 52s | 23.24% | 8.17 / 0 | 0 | |
| 6 | Multi 1 | | Elf-Aquitaine II | Cat 22.80m | | Jean Maurel (FRA) | m | 19d 10h 07m 28s | 32.44% | 7.6 / 0 | 0 | |
| 7 | | | Ker Cadelac | | | François Boucher (FRA) | m | 20d 05h 08m 15s | 37.84% | 7.3 / 0 | 0 | |
| 8 | | | Dupon Duran | | | Pascal Herold (FRA) | m | 21d 10h 14m 33s | 46.11% | 6.89 / 0 | 0 | |
| 9 | | | Tressitherm-Infractable | | | Stéphane Touloupe (FRA) | m | 21d 22h 54m 55s | 49.71% | 6.72 / 0 | 0 | |
| 10 | | | Espace Gard | | | Gérard Montariol (FRA) | m | 23d 00h 18m 03s | 56.92% | 6.41 / 0 | 0 | |
| 11 | | | EnergieCommunication | | | Florence Arthaud (FRA) | f | 23d 00h 19m 56s | 56.93% | 6.41 / 0 | 0 | |
| 12 | Mono 1 | | Kriter 8 | Kriter VIII | | Pierre Lenormand (FRA) | m | 23d 07h 50m 56s | 59.07% | 6.33 / 0 | 0 | |
| 13 | Multi 3 | | Sebago | | | Walter Green (USA) | m | 23d 10h 14m 39s | 59.75% | 6.3 / 0 | 0 | |
| 14 | | | Leroy Hamel | | | Éric Cadro (FRA) | m | 27d 09h 41m 08s | 86.87% | 5.39 / 0 | 0 | |
| TLE | Mono 3 | | Carteret Savings | | | Jack A. Boye (GBR) | m | Time Limit Exceeded | | | | |
| ABN | | | Grundig | | | Thierry Caroni (FRA) | m | | | | | |
| ABN | | | Ville Audrain | | | Wojciech Kaliski (POL) | m | | | | | |
| ABN | Multi 1 | | Côte d’Or II | Tri | | Éric Tabarly (FRA) | m | | | | | |
| ABN | | | Jeremy V | | | Jean-Jacques Vuylsteker (BEL) | m | | | | | |
| ABN | | | CTL Evénement dujeudi | | | Jean-Yves Richard (FRA) | m | | | | | |
| ABN | | | Jean Stalaven | | | Dominique Marsaudon (FRA) | m | | | | | |
| ABN | Multi 4 | | Gauloises IV - Roger Gallet | 13.72m Tri | 1979 | Eric Loizeau (FRA) | m | | | | | |
| ABN | | | Apricot | | | Tony Bullimore (GBR) | m | | | | | |
| ABN | | | Poulain | | | Olivier de Kersauzon (FRA) | m | | | | | |
| ABN | Multi 1 | | Jet Services | 22.86m Tri | | Daniel Gilard (FRA) | m | | | | | |
| ABN | Multi 1 | | Charente Maritime 2 | | | Pierre Follenfant (FRA) | m | | | | | |
| ABN | Multi 4 | | Barradal - FNAC | 12.18m Cat | 1983 | Hervé Cléris (FRA) | m | | | | | |
| ABN | Multi 3 | | Avenir | | | Louise Chambaz (CAN) | f | | | | | |
| ABN | Mono 1 | | Brioches Mary | | | Patrice Carpentier (FRA) | m | | | | | |
| ABN | | | Nems Luang | | | Paul Vatine (FRA) | m | | | | | |
| ABN | | | Seagull | | | Thierry Ledoux (FRA) | m | | | | | |
| ABN | | | Royale Disparu | | | Loïc Caradec (FRA) | m | | | | | |
