= 1982 Route du Rhum =

Event title
- Name: 1982 Route du Rhum
- Edition: 2nd Edition
- Host: Pen Duick SAS

Event details
- Start location: St Malo (FRA)
- Finish location: Guadeloupe
- Course: Solo Non-Stop Transatlantic Race
- Dates: Starts 1982
- Yachts: 50 Boats

Competitors
- Competitors: 50 Sailors

Results
- Line honours: Elf-Aquitaine - Marc Pajot (FRA)

Classes
- Class 0: Class 0 LHT >25.908m
- Class 1: Class 1 18.288 - 25.908m
- Class 2: Class 2 15.24 - 18.288m
- Class 3: Class 3 13.716 - 15.24m
- Class 4: Class 4 12.192 - 13.716m
- Class 5: Class 5 10.668 - 12.192m

The Route du Rhum is a single person transatlantic race the 1982 race was the 2nd edition and had six classes with 50 boats taking part.

== Results ==
Pos	Sail No.	Boat name	Year	Designer	LOH	Beam	Draft	Disp.	SA	Name / Nationality	Finish Time	Elapsed Time	Delta %	Ref.
1	Class 1 Multi	17	Elf-Aquitaine	Langevin	Cat 20m	10.90	2.30	8t	210m2	Marc Pajot (FRA)	18d 01h 38m 00s	433.63%	0	
2	Class 2 Multi	19	Jaz	Dubernet	Cat 17.6m	10	2.50	6t	275m2	Bruno Peyron (FRA)	18d 11h 46m 22s	443.77%	2.34	
3	Class 3 Multi	1	Vital	Nigel Irens	Cat 15.23m	8,40	2	3.2t	110m2	Mike Birch (CAN)	18d 13h 44m 06s	445.74%	2.79	
4	Class 5 Multi	115	Gauloises IV	Greene	Tri 13.71m	9.05	3	3.5t	110m2	Eric Loizeau (FRA)	19d 00h 27m 26s	456.46%	5.26	
5	Class 2 Multi	999	Charles Heidsieck V	Shuttleworth	Tri 18.24m	12	3	5.3	195m2	Alain Gabbay (FRA)	19d 00h 41m 00s	456.68%	5.32	
6	Class 5 Multi	23	Kriter X	Tri 11.31m Newick	11.31	8.10	2,28	2.5t	70m2	Jacques Petith (FRA)	19d 06h 45m 01s	462.75%	6.71	
7	Class 1 Multi	18	Jacques-Ribourel	Tri 24.45m Joubert	24.45	13	2.80	10t	215m2	Olivier de Kersauson (FRA)	19d 12h 59m 10s	468.99%	8.15	
8	Class 2 Multi	26	Umupro-Jardin V	Tri 16.15m Morrison	16.15	12.20	3.35	5t	150m2	Yvon Fauconnier (FRA)	19d 06h 45m 01s	462.75%	6.71	
9	Class 2 Multi	3	Fleury Michon VI	Tri 17m Shuttleworth	17	10.75	2.20	5.5 t	177m2	Philippe Poupon (FRA)	19d 15h 55m 56s	471.93%	8.83	
10	Class 1 Mono	28	Kriter VIII	Mono 23m Andre Mauric	23	3.80	3.50	15t	200m2	Michel Malinovski (FRA)	19d 16h 15m 38s	472.26%	8.91	
11			Télégramme de Brest							Yves Le Cornec (FRA)	19d 18h 57m 22s	474.96%	9.53	
12	Class 2 Multi		Royale	Tri 18.28m Graal	18.28	13	3	6,5t	205m2	Loïc Caradec (FRA)	20d 01h 09m 08s	481.15%	10.96	
13	Class 4 Multi	10	C.G.A	Tri 12.80m Newick	12.80	8.60	2.12	3t	78m2	Yves Gallot-Lavallée (FRA)	20d 12h 59m 05s	492.98%	13.69	
14	Class 1 Multi	350	Olympus III	Cat 21.3m MacAlpine/Downie	21.30	9.75	2.40	8.5 t	210m2	Robin Knox Johnston (GBR)	20d 20h 19m 50s	500.33%	15.38	
15	Class 4 Multi	42	Intermezzo - Sharp Vidéo	Tri 13.71m Graal	13.71	10	3	4t	130m2	Olivier Moussy (FRA)	20d 21h 23m 49s	501.4%	15.63	
16	Class 4 Multi	34	Lejaby-Rasurel	Tri 13.7m Newick	13.70	9.50	2	3,5t	116m2	François Forestier (FRA)	21d 16h 07m 27s	520.12%	19.95	
17	Class 5 Multi	22	La Baule-Télétota	Tri 11.40m Marina	11.40	8	2	1,9t	95m2	Loïc Peyron (FRA)	21d 20h 55m 32s	524.93%	21.05	
18	Class 0	32	William Saurin	Tri 27.10m Kelsall	27.10	15	2	11t	345m2	Eugène Riguidel (FRA)	22d 01h 28m 11s	529.47%	22.1	
19	Class 1 Multi	16	Charente-Maritime	Car 20m Joubert	20	10.40	2.70	6.5t	163m2	Pierre Follenfant (FRA)	22d 02h 36m 10s	530.6%	22.36	
20	Class 2 Multi	44	Biotherm II	Tri 18.25m Joubert	18.28	13	2.60	6t	90m2	Florence Arthaud (FRA)	22d 05h 36m 49s	533.61%	23.06	
21	Class 1 Mono	15	Champagne-Charlie	Mono 20.40m Vaton	20.40	5.05	3.28	21t	205m2	Jean-Claude Parisis (FRA)	22d 15h 19m 02s	543.32%	25.29	
22	Class 1 Mono	157	Wild Rocket	Mono 19.20m Auzepy-Brenneur	19.20	5	3	30t	173m2	Joël Charpentier (FRA)	23d 03h 48m 32s	555.81%	28.17	
23	Class 4 Multi	33	Skyjack	Cat 13.68m Spronk	13.68	6.70	1.82	4.5t		Philippe Walwyn (USA)	23d 12h 10m 32s	564.18%	30.1	
24	Class 5 Multi	888	Humdinger - Aspen	Tri 10.67m Greene	10.67	8.93	2.12	2.5t		Klaus Schrodt (GER)	23d 18h 25m 12s	570.42%	31.54	
25	Class 3 Multi	6	As-Eco	Tri 15.23 Greene	15.23	10.97	2.40	5t	150m2	Walter Green (USA)	24d 03h 31m 44s	579.53%	33.64	
26	Class 5 Mono	4	S.P.R.A 1	Mono 11.5m Castro	11.50	3.85	1.90	5.4t	85m2	Patrice Carpentier (FRA)	24d 16h 47m 05s	592.78%	36.7	
27	Class 5 Mono	7	Dirickx	Mono 11.5m Castro	11.50	3.85	1.90	5.4t	85m2	Jean Bertrand Mothes-Massé (FRA)	24d 18h 02m 00s	594.03%	36.99	
28	Class 4 Multi	30	Improvedibile - Le Monde de la Mer	Tri 13.70m Newick	13.70	9	2.30	3.5t	120m2	Jean-Pierre Derunes (FRA)	24d 19h 52m 22s	595.87%	37.41	
29	Class 3 Multi	112	Créateur d'Entreprises	Tri 14.99m Caroff	14.99	10.50	2.50	4.2t	140m2	Michel Ralys (FRA)	25d 07h 31m 19s	607.52%	40.1	
30	Class 4 Mono		Société-Collyer	Mono 13.40, Engelmark	13.40	2.55	1.95	5t		Hervé Laurent (FRA)	26d 07h 41m 35s	631.69%	45.67	
31	Class 5 Mono	971	Brise	Mono 10.80m Pye	10.80	3.60	1.85	8t	75m2	Jacques Pallasset (FRA)	28d 03h 09m 00s	675.15%	55.7	
ABN	Class 3 Mono	29	Vigorosol	Mono 15.10m	15.10	4,75	2.50	12t	150m2	Paolo Sciarretta (ITA)				
ABN	Class 5 Multi	40	Rennie	Tri 10.67m Crowther	10.67	9.14	1.55	2t		Ian Johnston (AUS)				
ABN	Class 2 Mono	81	Pantashop - Stages Linski	Mono 17m Vaton	17	4.68	2.88	15t	178m2	Marc Linsky (FRA)				
ABN	Class 4 Multi	36	Côte Basque	Tri 13.70m Graal	13.70	10	3	4t	130m2	Didier Munduteguy (FRA)				
ABN	Class 4 Multi	110	SV Caddy	Tri 13.71m Langevin	13.71	13	2.50	4,2t	140m2	François Boucher (FRA)				
ABN	Class 4 Multi		Transport Jet	Tri 12.80m Newick	12.80	8.60	2.12	3t	78m2	Patrick Morvan (FRA)				
ABN	Class 5 Multi	20	Filtrasol	Tri 12m Kelsall	12	9.30	1,50	1.7t	60m2	Thierry Caroni (FRA)				
ABN	Class 4 Multi	55	Brittany Ferries Fr	Tri 13.70m Newick	13.70	8.40	2	4t	98m2	Daniel Gilard (FRA)				
ABN	Class 4 Multi	82	Cenet	Tri 12.19m Irens	12.19	9.50	2	2t	100m2	Jacques Dewez (FRA)				
ABN	Class 5 Mono	5	S.P.R.A 2	Mono 11.5m Castro	11.50	3.85	1.90	5.4t	85m2	Jean-Michel Carpentier (FRA)				
ABN	Class 5 Mono		Compas Contest	Mono 11.75m Berret	11.75	3.90	2.10	7t	82m2	Dominique Gautron (FRA)				
ABN	Class 2 Multi	II	Colt Cars	Tri 18.28m Holland	18.28	12.19	2.74	5.5t	205m2	Robert James (GBR)				
ABN			Chaînegaz							A. Renouard (FRA)				
ABN	Class 5 Multi	116	Club Montanier	Tri 12.19m Joubert	12.19	9	1.60	3t	85m2	Alain Labbé (FRA)				
ABN	Class 4 Multi	37	Edonil	Cat 13m Gahinet	13	9	2.50	2.5t	150m2	Daniel Le Méné (FRA)				
ABN	Class 4 Mono	57	Maison Phénix	Mono 13.05m Frers	13.05	4	2.10	8t	82m2	Yvan Griboval (FRA)				
ABN	Class 2 Multi	111	Gauthier III	Tri 18.20m Langevin	18.20	16.20	2.70	6t	206m2	Jean-Yves Terlain (FRA)				
ABN	Class 2 Multi	2	Rosière	Proa 18.25m Ollier / Devaux	18.25	24	3	4.8t	201m2	Guy Delage (FRA)				
ABN	Class 2 Multi	14	Paul Ricard	Tri 17m de Bergh	17	17	2	8t	180m2	Éric Tabarly (FRA)				
DNS	Class 1 Multi	345	Brittany Ferries GB	20 Tri Shuttleworth	20	12	3	6.7t	200m2	Chay Blyth (GBR)				
DNS	Class 2 Multi		But	Tri 16.15m Greene	16.15	10.97	2,40	5t	150m2	Paul Ayasse (FRA)				
DNS	Class 5 Mono	39	Credit du Nord	Mono 11.70 Frers						Philippe Machefaux (FRA)				
DNS	Class 5 Mono	25	Les Economats	Mono 10.90m Stephens	10.90	3.15	1.90	5.3	70m2	Yves Parent (FRA)				
