= 1990 Route du Rhum =

Solo Transatlantic Ocean Sailing Race

Event title
- Name: 1990 Route du Rhum
- Edition: 4th Edition
- Host: Pen Duick SAS

Event details
- Start location: St Malo (FRA)
- Finish location: Guadeloupe
- Course: Solo Non-Stop Transatlantic Race
- Dates: Starts 1990
- Yachts: 50 Boats

Competitors
- Competitors: 50 Sailors

Classes
- Class 1: Class 1 Multi 15.24 - 18.28m
- Class 2: Class 2 Multi 12.94 - 15.24m
- Class 3: Class 3 Multi 10.66 - 12.94m
- Class 4: Class 1 Mono 18.28 - 25.90m
- Class 5: Class 2 Mono 15.24 - 18.28m
- Class 6: Class 3 Mono 13.72 - 15.24m

The Route du Rhum is a single person transatlantic race the 1990 race was the 4th edition and had six classes with 50 boats taking part.

== Results ==
Pos	Class	Sail No.	Boat name	Year	Name / Nationality	Elapsed Time	Delta %	Distance Sailed		Ref.
1	Multi 1 / ORMA	F1	Groupe Pierre 1er	1989	Florence Arthaud (FRA)	14d 10h 08m 28s	0%	10.23 / 0		
2	Multi 1 / ORMA	21	Fleury-Michon IX	1988	Philippe Poupon (FRA)	14d 18h 39m 36s	2.46%	9.99 / 0		
3	Multi 1 / ORMA	1	RMO	1990	Laurent Bourgnon (SUI)	14d 18h 46m 31s	2.49%	9.98 / 0	0	
4	Multi 1 / ORMA	39	Fujichrome	1990	Mike Birch (CAN)	14d 21h 47m 0s	3.36%	9.9 / 0	0	
5	Multi 1 / ORMA	35	Saint-Malo	1987	Lionel Péan (FRA)	15d 15h 27m 0s	8.47%	9.43 / 0	0	
6	Multi 1 / ORMA	_018	Fujicolor	1987	Didier Mundutéguy (FRA)	15d 18h 52m 0s	9.45%	9.35 / 0	0	
7	Multi 1 / ORMA	13	Jamet	1984	Halvard Mabire (FRA)	15d 19h 08m 0s	9.53%	9.34 / 0	0	
8	Multi 1 / ORMA		Esso Super Plus	1987	Yves Le Cornec (FRA)	16d 05h 18m 0s	12.47%	9.1 / 0	0	
9	Multi 1	74	Dupon Duran 2	1990	Pascal Herold (FRA)	16d 06h 47m 0s	12.9%	9.06 / 0	0	
10			BPO		Francis Joyon (FRA)	17d 13h 14m 0s	21.69%	8.41 / 0	0	
11	Mono 2		Ecureuil d'Aquitaine	1989 Petit/Bouvet	Titouan Lamazou (FRA)	17d 14h 15m 0s	21.99%	8.39 / 0	0	
12	Multi 1	76	Haute Normandie NC	1982 Shuttleworth	Paul Vatine (FRA)	0d 0h 0m 0s	0%	0 / 0	0	
13	Multi 2	29	Océanopolis Brest NC	1990 Irens	Hervé Cléris (FRA)	0d 0h 0m 0s	0%	0 / 0	0	
14	Mono 1		Dix de Lyon NC	1981 Mauric	Patrick Morvan (FRA)	0d 0h 0m 0s	0%	0 / 0	0	
15	Multi 1		Nootka NC	1990 Nigel Irens	Claude Develay (FRA)	0d 0h 0m 0s	0%	0 / 0	0	
16	Mono 2		Rancagua NC	1986 Farr	Guy Bernardin (FRA)	0d 0h 0m 0s	0%	0 / 0	0	
17			Sarthe Compétition NC		Patrice Carpentier (FRA)	0d 0h 0m 0s	0%	0 / 0	0	
18	Multi 2	314	Trois Quatorze NC	1983 Langevin	Patrick Lafrate (FRA)	0d 0h 0m 0s	0%	0 / 0	0	
19	Multi 2	9	Challenge Europe - Toulon Charlemagne NC	1982 Morrison	Henri Chemineau (FRA)	0d 0h 0m 0s	0%	0 / 0	0	
20	Mono 3		Port de Gravelines NC	1990	Eric Bardaille (FRA)	0d 0h 0m 0s	0%	0 / 0	0	
ABN	Mono 3		Jeremi	1980 Holman & Pye	Jean-Jacques Vuylsteker (BEL)					
ABN	Multi 1 / ORMA		Elf Aquitaine III	1988	Jean Maurel (FRA)					
ABN		F99	Sociétéj.P. Turco	1986 Cormier	Henri Cormier (FRA)					
ABN	Multi 2	46	Vidal		Patrick Coulombel (FRA)					
ABN	Multi 1 / ORMA		Lada Poch IV	1987	Loïck Peyron (FRA)					
ABN	Multi 1 / ORMA		Groupe LG	1985	Bertrand de Broc (FRA)					
ABN	Mono 3		Let’s Go	1979 Wasa Yachts	Pierre Tanays (FRA)					
