= 1994 Route du Rhum =

Event title
- Name: 1994 Route du Rhum
- Edition: 5th Edition
- Sponsor: La Banque Postale
- Host: Pen Duick SAS

Event details
- Start location: St Malo (FRA)
- Finish location: Guadeloupe
- Course: Solo Non-Stop Transatlantic Race
- Dates: Starts 1994
- Yachts: Boats

Competitors
- Competitors: Sailors

Results
- Line honours: Primagaz: Laurent Bourgnon (SUI)

Classes
- Class 2: Class 1 Multi; ORMA 60
- Class 3: Class 2 Multi
- Class 4: Class 3 Multi
- Class 6: Class 1 Mono
- Class 7: Class 2 Mono; IMOCA 60
- Class 8: Class 3 Mono

The Route du Rhum is a single person transatlantic yacht race. The 1994 race was the 5th edition and had eight classes with 35 boats taking part.

== Results ==
Pos	Class	Sail No.	Boat name	Year / Designer	Name / Nationality		Finish Time	Delta %	Rhum Speed	Distance Sailed	Ref.
1	Multi 1 ORMA 60		Primagaz	1990 VPLP	Laurent Bourgnon (SUI)	m	14d 06h 28m 29s	0%	10.34	4353	
2	Multi 1 ORMA 60	276	Région Haute-Normandie	1994 Nigel Irens	Paul Vatine (FRA)	m	14d 09h 38m 56s	0.93%	10.25	4159	
3	Mono 2 - IMOCA 60		Cacolac d'Aquitaine		Yves Parlier (FRA)	m	15d 19h 23m 35s	10.78%	9.34	3731	
4	Mono 2 - IMOCA 60		Bagages Superior	1992 Finot	Alain Gautier (FRA)	m	16d 00h 33m 18s	12.29%	9.21	3927	
5			Lakota		Steve Fossett (USA)	m	17d 08h 08m 52s	21.51%	8.51	5025	
6	Mono 2 - IMOCA 60	1993	Groupe LG		Gerry Roufs (CAN)	m	18d 17h 51m 17s	31.35%	7.87	3782	
7			Dupon Duran III		Pascal Herold (FRA)	m	19d 05h 44m 29s	34.82%	7.67	4399	
8			Wilson Sportswear		Jean Maurel Harris (FRA)	m	20d 03h 16m 39s	41.11%	7.33		
9	Mono 2 - IMOCA 60		La Vie Auchan	1992 Bouvet-Petit	Patrick Tabarly (FRA)	m	20d 22h 38m 56s	46.77%	7.05	4088	
10	Mono 2 - IMOCA 60	FRA 85	PRB Vendée	1991 Lucas	Jean-Yves Hasselin (FRA)	m	21d 19h 02m 41s	52.73%	6.77	4028	
11			Laiteries de Saint-Malo		François-René Carluer (FRA)	m	21d 23h 32m 39s	54.04%	6.71 / 0	3808	
12			Casino d'Etretat		Eric Dumont (FRA)	m	22d 08h 58m 21s	56.79%	6.6 / 0	4063	
13			Claussejardin		Fred Dahirel (FRA)	m	22d 22h 25m 15s	60.72%	6.44 / 0	3922	
14	Mono 3		14 ans-Friskies		Jean-Jacques Vuilstreker (BEL)	m	0d 0h 0m 0s	0%	0 / 0	4016	
ABN	Multi 2		Saint-Malo Entreprises	1990 Nigel Irens	Hervé Cléris (FRA)	m					
ABN	Multi 1		Nootka	1989 VPLP	Claude Develay (FRA)	m					
ABN	Multi 1		Fujicolor II	1990 Irens	Loïck Peyron (FRA)	m	Dismasted				
ABN	Multi 1		Biscuits-La-Trinitaine	1988 Iren	Mike Birch (CAN)	m					
ABN	Multi 1	8	Banque Populaire	1994 Nigel Irens	Francis Joyon (FRA)	m					
ABN	Multi 2		Brocéliande	1992 Joubert-Nivelt	Dominique Marsaudon (FRA)	m					
ABN	Multi 1	971	Twinsea DEFI GUADELOUPE	1987 Alan Williams	Claude Bistoquet (FRA)	m					
ABN	Multi 1		Omapi	1984 Ollier	Hervé Laurent (FRA)	m					
ABN	Mono 2 - IMOCA 60		Amnesty Internationale		Thierry Dubois (FRA)	m					
ABN	Mono 2 - IMOCA 60		Cherbourg Technologies		Halvard Mabire (FRA)	m					
ABN	Mono 1		Etoile Molène		Bob Escoffier (FRA)	m					
DID NOT START
DNS	Multi 2		Cote de Gaspe		Augustin Cotton (CAN)	m					
DNS	Multi 3		-		Patrick Coulombel (FRA)	m					
DNS	Multi 3		Severalles Challenges		Brian Thompson (GBR)	m					
DNS	Mono 1		Pen Duick VI	1973 Mauic	Arnaud Dhallenne (FRA)	m					
