= 1998 Route du Rhum =

Solo Transatlantic Ocean Sailing Race

Event title
- Name: 1998 Route du Rhum
- Edition: 6th Edition
- Sponsor: La Banque Postale
- Host: Pen Duick SAS

Event details
- Start location: St Malo (FRA)
- Finish location: Guadeloupe
- Course: Solo Non-Stop Transatlantic Race
- Dates: Starts 1998
- Yachts: 35 Boats

Competitors
- Competitors: 35 Sailors
- Competing nations: CAN 1, FRA 29, GBR 2, ITA 1, SUI 2

Results
- Line honours: Primagaz: Laurent Bourgnon (SUI)

Classes
- Class 1: ORMA 60
- Class 2: Class 1 Multi
- Class 3: Class 2 Multi
- Class 4: Class 3 Multi
- Class 5: IMOCA 60
- Class 6: Class 1 Mono
- Class 7: Class 2 Mono
- Class 8: Class 3 Mono

The Route du Rhum is a single person transatlantic race the 1998 race was the 6th edition and had eight classes with 35 boats taking part.

== Results ==
Pos	Class	Sail No.	Boat name	Year / Designer	Name / Nationality	Finish Time	Delta %	Speed Rhum / Water	Distance Sailed	Ref.
1	ORMA 60	1	Primagaz	1990 VPLP	Laurent Bourgnon (SUI)	12d 08h 41m 06s	0%	11.94 / -	-	
2	ORMA 60	101	Brocéliande	1997	Alain Gautier (FRA)	12d 11h 54m 32s	1.09%	11.81 / -	-	
3	ORMA 60		Groupama (1)	1998 VPLP	Franck Cammas (FRA)	12d 19h 41m 13s	3.71%	11.51 / -	-	
4	ORMA 60		La Trinitaine	Aug. 1998 Irens	Marc Guillemot (FRA)	12d 19h 49m 41s	3.76%	11.51 / -	-	
5	ORMA 60		Fujicolor II	1990 Irens	Loïck Peyron (FRA)	13d 02h 38m 12s	6.05%	11.26 / 0	0	
6	ORMA 60	8	Banque Populaire	1994 Nigel Irens	Francis Joyon (FRA)	13d 13h 41m 30s	9.78%	10.88 / 0	0	
7	ORMA 60	7	Chauss'Europ	1994 Nigel Irens	Paul Vatine (FRA)	13d 23h 37m 44s	13.13%	10.55 / 0	0	
8	ORMA 60	FRA 35	Laiterie St Malo-Défi Malouin	1988 Giles Oliver	François-René Carluer (FRA)	16d 03h 33m 20s	30.63%	9.14 / 0	0	
9	IMOCA 60	1	Aquitaine Innovations	1996 Finot	Thomas Coville (FRA)	18d 07h 53m 32s	48.27%	8.05 / 0	0	
10	IMOCA 60	8	Algimouss	1992 Harle	Jean-Luc Van Den Heede (FRA)	18d 21h 04m 16s	52.71%	7.82 / 0	0	
11	Multihull 2	16	Eléphant Bleu	1990 Nigel Irens	Mike Birch (CAN)	19d 02h 14m 50s	54.46%	7.73 / 0	0	
12	IMOCA 60		Sodébo	1999 Finot	Raphaël Dinelli (FRA)	19d 09h 58m 17s	57.06%	7.6 / 0	0	
13	Multihull 2		Gamin - Deleage Diazo	1999 Brouns	Franck-Yves Escoffier (FRA)	19d 16h 16m 27s	59.18%	7.5 / 0	0	
14	IMOCA 60		Maison Côté Ouest-Aigle	1992 Bouvet-Petit	Jean Maurel (FRA)	19d 20h 12m 08s	60.51%	7.44 / 0	0	
15	Multihull 2		CLM	1990 Irens	Hérvé Cléris (FRA)	20d 04h 58m 14s	63.46%	7.3 / 0	0	
16	Monohull 2		Kingfisher	1996 Thompson	Ellen MacArthur (GBR)	20d 11h 44m 48s	65.75%	7.2 / 0	0	
17	Multihull 3		Triga IV - Kelly Services	1989 VPLP	Stève Ravussin (SUI)	20d 17h 27m 10s	67.67%	7.12 / 0	0	
18	IMOCA 60		Uunet	1989 Briand	Philippe Monnet (FRA)	21d 01h 30m 45s	70.39%	7.01 / 0	0	
19	Monohull 2		Multicap Gamelin	1995 Mortain/Caraibes	Luc Coquelin (FRA)	21d 21h 35m 54s	77.16%	6.74 / 0	0	
20	Multihull 3		Chaussettes Olympia	1980 Greene	Charlie Capelle (FRA)	22d 04h 15m 06s	79.4%	6.65 / 0	0	
21	Multihull 3		Friends & Lovers	1981 Greene	Pierre Antoine (FRA)	23d 14h 06m 04s	90.81%	6.26 / 0	0	
22	Multihull 1		Adecco Etoile Filante	1989 Joubert-Nivel	Bob Escoffier (FRA)	23d 16h 07m 54s	91.49%	6.23 / 0	0	
23	IMOCA 60		Groupe Batteur-Défi 14 PME	1992 Harle	Loïc Pochet (FRA)	24d 08h 43m 06s	97.08%	6.06 / 0	0	
24	Monohull 2		Armor Lux	1983	Anne Caseneuve (FRA)	24d 12h 48m 30s	98.46%	6.02 / 0	0	
25	Monohull 1		Les Mousquetaires	1981 (Vaton)	Frédéric Lescot (FRA)	25d 14h 36m 45s	107.16%	5.76 / 0	0	
26	IMOCA 60		Italia Telecom TNT	1992 Malingri	Simone Bianchetti (ITA)	27d 05h 06m 01s	120.13%	5.42 / 0	0	
27	Multi 50		Casino Val André	1997 Joubert-Nivelt	Pascal Quintin (FRA)	28d 06h 12m 02s	128.59%	5.22 / 0	0	
TLE	Monohull 3		Chaleur Fioul	1991 Harle	Didier Levillain (FRA)					
ABN	ORMA 60		Yprema	1985 Thompson/Humphries	Yvan Bourgnon (SUI)					
ABN	Monohull 2		Région Guadeloupe - RFO	1994 Berret-Racoupeau	Victor Jean-Noël (FRA)					
ABN	IMOCA 60		Victoria Group	1990 Finot	Mark Gatehouse (GBR)					
ABN	IMOCA 60		Le Havre 2000	1992 Finot	Eric Dumont (FRA)					
ABN	Multihull 3		Lyland & Mc Gill Solidaire	1991 Coulombel	Patrick Coulombel (FRA)					
ABN	IMOCA 60		Baume & Mercier		Bernard Malaret (FRA)					
ABN	IMOCA 60		Whirlpool/Europe 2	1998 Lombard	Catherine Chabaud (FRA)					
