= Alex Pella =

Spanish yachtsman (born 1972)

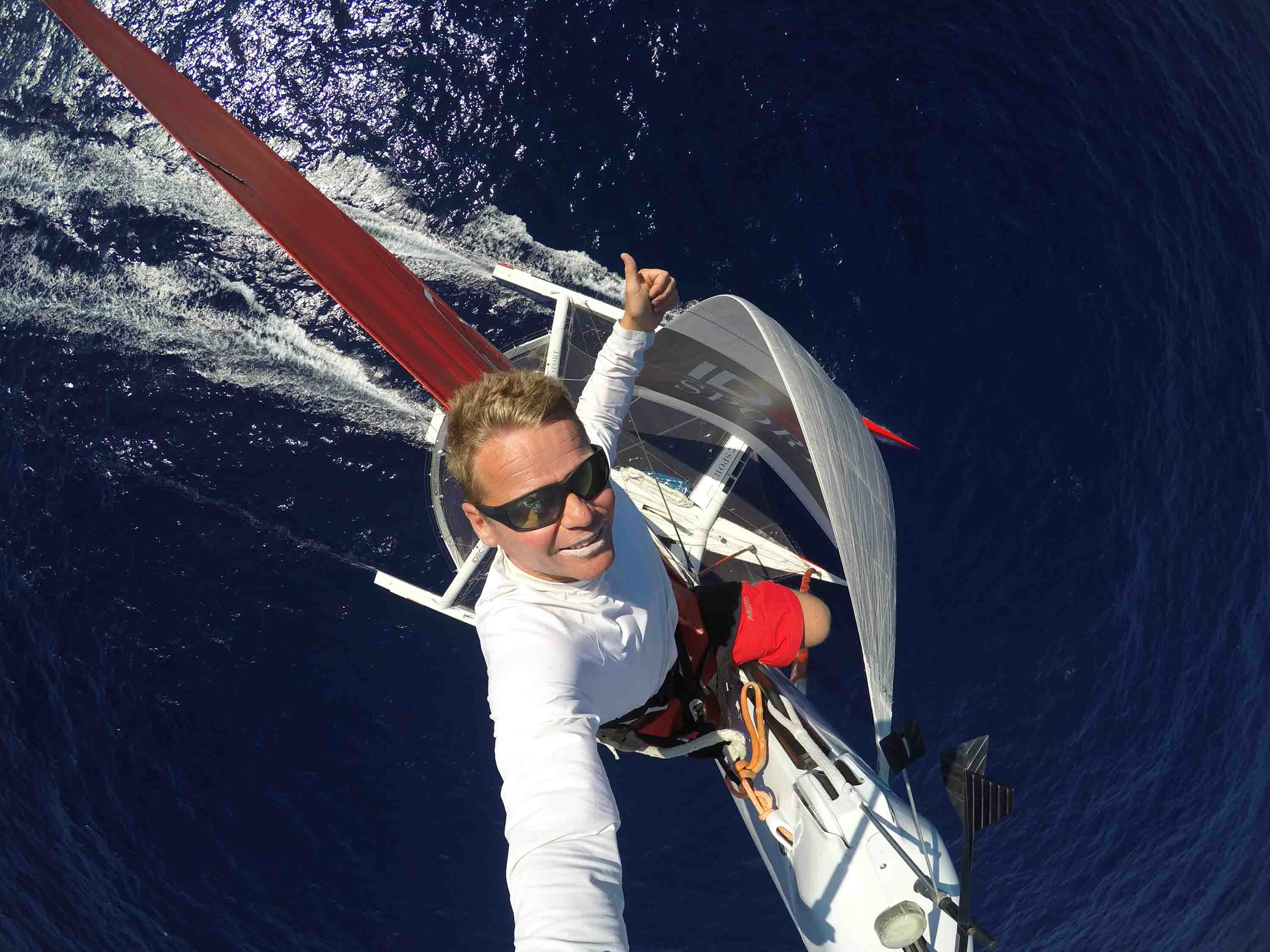
- Alex Pella

Personal information
- Nickname: The Spanish Devil
- Nationality: Spanish
- Born: 2 November 1972 (age 54) Barcelona
- Website: alexpella.es

Sport
- Country: Spain
- Sport: Sailing
- Club: Royal Barcelona Yacht Club

Achievements and titles
- Personal bests: Jules Verne Trophy 2017 Absolute round-the-world speed sailing record. Fastest circumnavigation of the world; 1st Transat Jacques Vabre 2017 Multi50; 1st Route du Rhum 2014 First and only Spaniard to win a transoceanic single-handed regatta; 2nd Mini Transat 6.50 2005 First and only Spaniard to win a leg of a transoceanic single-handed regatta & 3rd Mini Transat 6.50 2003 First and only Spanish podium on a transoceanic single-handed regatta

Alex Pella (born 2 November 1972) is a Spanish yachtsman. In 2014 he became the first Spaniard to win a transoceanic single-handed race, the Route du Rhum. Alex Pella made history once again, on 26 January 2017, when he broke, with the rest of the team, the absolute round-the-world speed sailing record, known as the Jules Verne Trophy, aboard the sophisticated maxi-multihull IDEC 3. They circumnavigated the planet in 40 days, 23 hours, 30 minutes and 30 seconds.

== Early life ==
Alex was born in Barcelona on 2 November 1972, within a nautical environment and a sailing family. Second of four brothers, who have all made boats and sailing their profession, he began to sail as a very young boy aboard his family’s yacht. To date, Alex has sailed on all kinds of racing boats, from the light Mini Transat 6.50 to the most sophisticated Maxi-Trimarans.

Alex has been a professional sailor for over 15 years, in which he has completed more than 150.000 nautical miles. He discovered his passion for offshore single-handed sailing at the end of the 1990s while preparing two Spanish boats for the Solitaire du Figaro.

In his first internationally renowned race -the Mini Transat 6.50 - Alex Pella obtained the best classifications in history for a non-French skipper. He was third in 2003 and second in 2005, winning the long leg from the Canary Islands to Brazil.

He thus became the first and only Spanish to win a leg in a transoceanic solo race.

== Other accomplishments ==
On 19 November 2014, Alex Pella won the Route du Rhum aboard the "Tales II" and became the first and only Spaniard to win a transoceanic single-handed regatta.

Alex Pella wrote himself into the history books of the Route du Rhum solo Transatlantic race and Spanish ocean racing when he crossed the finish line of the 3542 miles La Route du Rhum-Destination Guadeloupe race first in Class40 at 06:47:08 hrs TU/07:47:08hrs CET/02:47:08 Local Gaudeloupe.

He sets a new course record of 16d17h47m8s, beating the 2010 mark for the 40 foot Class 17d 23h 10m by 1d 5h 23m 09s.

After starting off Saint Malo on his 42nd birthday, Sunday 2 November, the Spanish sailor took 16d17h47m8s to complete the 3542 miles course, at a theoretical average speed of 8.82kts. In reality he sailed 4336 miles at an average speed of 10.79kts.

== Sporting career ==
2021:

- 1st RORC Transatlantic Race, aboard the Multi50 "Rayon Vert"
- Ultim 32/23 Circuit
- Classic Yachts Circuit, aboard the S&S Sparkman & Stephens "Galvana" of The Pella Brothers

2020:

- 3rd RORC Caribbean 600 – Swan Challenges Series, aboard the Swan65 S&S Sparkman & Stephens "Libelula"
- Ultim 32/23 Circuit

2019:

- 3rd Brest Atlantiques, aboard the Ultim "Actual Leader" with Yves Le Blevec
- Ultim 32/23 Circuit (Armen Race, Fastnet Race...etc.)
- 3rd Défi Atlantique, aboard the Class 40 "Made in Midi" with Kito de Pavant
- 2nd Panerai Transat Classique, aboard the Yawl Olin Stephens "Stiren"

2018:

- Record Hong Kong - London, Tea Route, in 36 days, 2 hours, 37 minutes and 12 seconds, aboard the MOD70 Maserati
- 3rd Swan Cup, aboard the Swan65 S&S Sparkman & Stephens "Libelula"
- Classic Yachts Circuit, aboard the S&S Sparkman & Stephens "Galvana" of The Pella Brothers

2017:

- 1st Transat Jacques Vabre, Multi50 aboard the Arkema in 10 days, 19 hours, 14 minutes and 19 seconds
- Jules Verne Trophy, absolute round-the-world speed sailing record, aboard the IDEC 3. Fastest circumnavigation of the world in 40 days, 23 hours, 30 minutes and 30 seconds
- 2nd The Bridge, aboard the IDEC 3
- South Indian Ocean Record in 5 days, 21 hours, 7 minutes and 45 seconds, aboard the IDEC 3
- South Pacific Ocean Record in 7 days, 21 hours, 13 minutes and 31 seconds, aboard the IDEC 3
- Equator to Equator Record in 29 days, 9 hours, 10 minutes and 55 seconds, aboard the IDEC 3
- Classic Yachts Circuit, aboard the S&S Sparkman & Stephens "Galvana" of The Pella Brothers
- In 2017-18, he was a crewmember on leg 3 with Team AkzoNobel in the Volvo Ocean Race .

2016:

- Jules Verne Trophy, record attempt, aboard the IDEC 3. Circumnavigation of the world in 47 days, 14 hours and 47 minutes
- Substitute of the Vendée Globe, round-the-world, single-handed regatta, for the French skipper Kito de Pavant
- IMOCA 60 Circuit
- Abandon Transat Québec-Saint-Malo, capsized aboard the "MOD70 Musandam Oman-Sail"
- Classic Yachts Circuit, aboard the S&S Sparkman & Stephens "Galvana" of The Pella Brothers

2015:

- 1st Sailing Arabia – The Tour, aboard the “EFG Bank (Monaco)” of Sidney Gavignet
- Round Ireland Sailing Record in 40 hours, 51 minutes and 57 seconds, aboard the "MOD 70 Musandam-Oman Sail"
- Indian Ocean Record in 6 days, 23 hours and 4 minutes, aboard the IDEC 3, between Cape Agulhas in South Africa (20°East) and South East Cape in Tasmania (146°49 East)

2014:

- 1st Route du Rhum, aboard the “Tales II”
- Record Route du Rhum – Class40 in 16 days, 17 hours, 47 minutes and 8 seconds, aboard the “Tales II”
- First and only Spanish to win a transoceanic single-handed regatta
- Trophée Course Open UNCL (Union Nationale pour la Course au Large)
- Class40 Circuit

2013:

- Class40 Circuit
- 2nd Transat Jacques Vabre (Transoceanic double-handed regatta), aboard the “Tales II” of Gonzalo Botín
- Oceanic Multihull Circuit
- 1st Around Europe, Route des Princes, aboard the Maxi-Trimaran, “Prince de Bretagne 80” of Lionel Lemonchois

2012:

- IMOCA 60 Circuit
- 4th Around Europe, Europa Warm’UP, aboard the “Groupe Bel” of Kito de Pavant
- Substitute of the Vendée Globe, round-the-world, single-handed regatta, for the French skipper Kito de Pavant
- Skipper of the IMOCA 60 “DCNS” for the film “Turning Tide” (“En Solitaire”), with the famous French actor Fraçois Cluzet

2011:

- IMOCA 60 Circuit
- 4th Barcelona World Race (round-the-world, double-handed regatta, 30.000 miles), aboard the “Estrella Damm”

2010:

- IMOCA 60 Circuit
- 3rd Vuelta a España, with crew, aboard the “Estrella Damm”
- Record New York – Barcelona in 12 days, 6 hours, 3 minutes and 48 seconds, aboard the “Estrella Damm”
- 1st Class40 World Championships, aboard the “TALES” of Gonzalo Botín

2009:

- IMOCA 60 Circuit
- 4th Istanbul Europa Race, aboard the “Virbac Paprec” of Jean Pierre Dick
- 5th Transat Jacques Vabre (Transoceanic double-handed regatta), aboard the “W Hotels”

2008:

- Class40 Circuit, double-handed, aboard the “Tales” of Gonzalo Botín
- 2nd Class40 World Championships

2007:

- Record Denia - Ibiza in 5 hours, 38 minutes and 11 seconds, aboard the “Generalitat Valenciana”
- Mini Transat 6.50 Circuit, single-handed, aboard the “Generalitat Valenciana”
- Abandon Mini Transat 6.50 after dismasting near Cape Verde

2006:

- Med Cup Circuit TP 52, aboard the “BRIBÓN”, skipped by S.M. Juan Carlos I
- Mini Transat 6.50 Circuit, single-handed, aboard the “OpenSea”

2005:

- 2nd Mini Transat 6.50 (International Transoceanic single-handed regatta, 90 participants), aboard the “OpenSea-TeamWork”
- First and only Spanish to win a leg of a transoceanic single-handed regatta
- Mini Transat 6.50 aboard the “OpenSea”

2004:

- IMS Circuit aboard the “Azur de Puig” skipped by S.A.R la Infanta Cristina
- Mini Transat 6.50 Circuit aboard the “Open Sea”, double and single-handed
- Preparation ORMA 60 “GITANA” Trimaran
- Selected Best Spanish Sailor Year 2003

2003:

- 3rd Mini Transat 6.50 (International Transoceanic single-handed regatta, 90 participants) aboard the “Santiveri-Texknit”
- First Spanish podium on a single-handed transoceanic regatta
- Mini Transat 6.50 Circuit, aboard the “Sampaquita”

== Awards ==
- Juan Sebastian Elcano Award 2019
- Selected Best Spanish Sailor Year 2014
- Trophée Course Open UNCL (Union Nationale pour la Course au Large) Year 2014
- Selected Best Spanish Sailor Year 2013
- Selected Best Spanish Sailor Year 2003

== Filmography ==
- 2017: "Informe Robinson: La vuelta al mundo de Alex Pella"
- 2014: "Esta es la victoria de todos" - Route du Rhum Documentary Alex Pella
- 2013: Turning Tide (En solitaire) de Christophe Offenstein Making-of "Turning Tide" (En solitaire)
