= 1978 Route du Rhum =

Event title
- Name: 1978 Route du Rhum
- Edition: 1st Edition

Event details
- Start location: St Malo (FRA)
- Finish location: Pointe-à-Pitre (Guadeloupe)
- Course: Solo Non-Stop Transatlantic Race
- Dates: Starts 1978
- Yachts: 36 Boats

Competitors
- Competitors: 36 Sailors

The Route du Rhum is a single person transatlantic race first run in 1978.

The inaugural race had an unusually close finish for a trans ocean race of this era where boats varied so much. Under 8 minutes separated Mike Birch on his trimaran and Michel Malinovski, as can be seen in vintage footage.

== Gallery ==
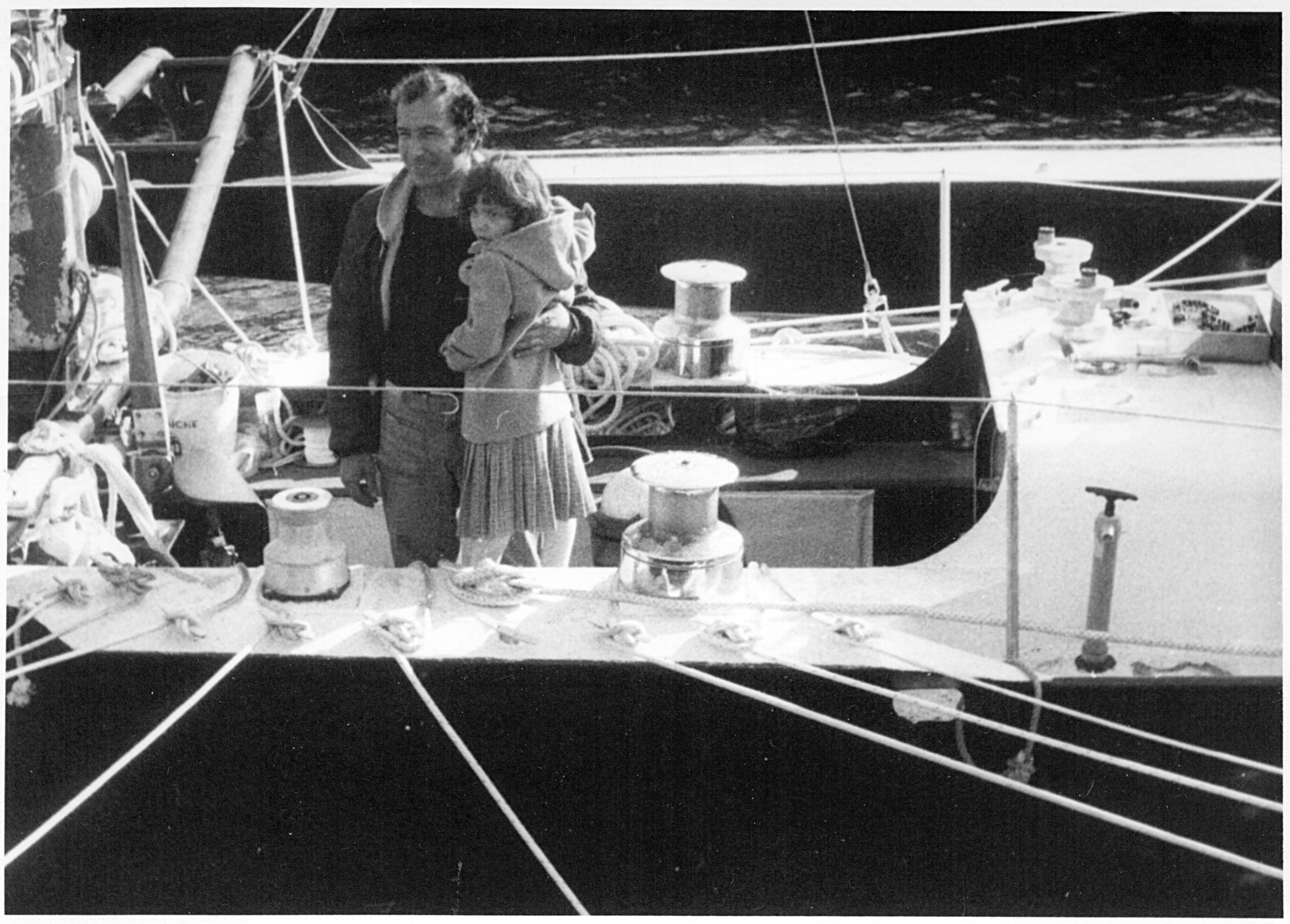

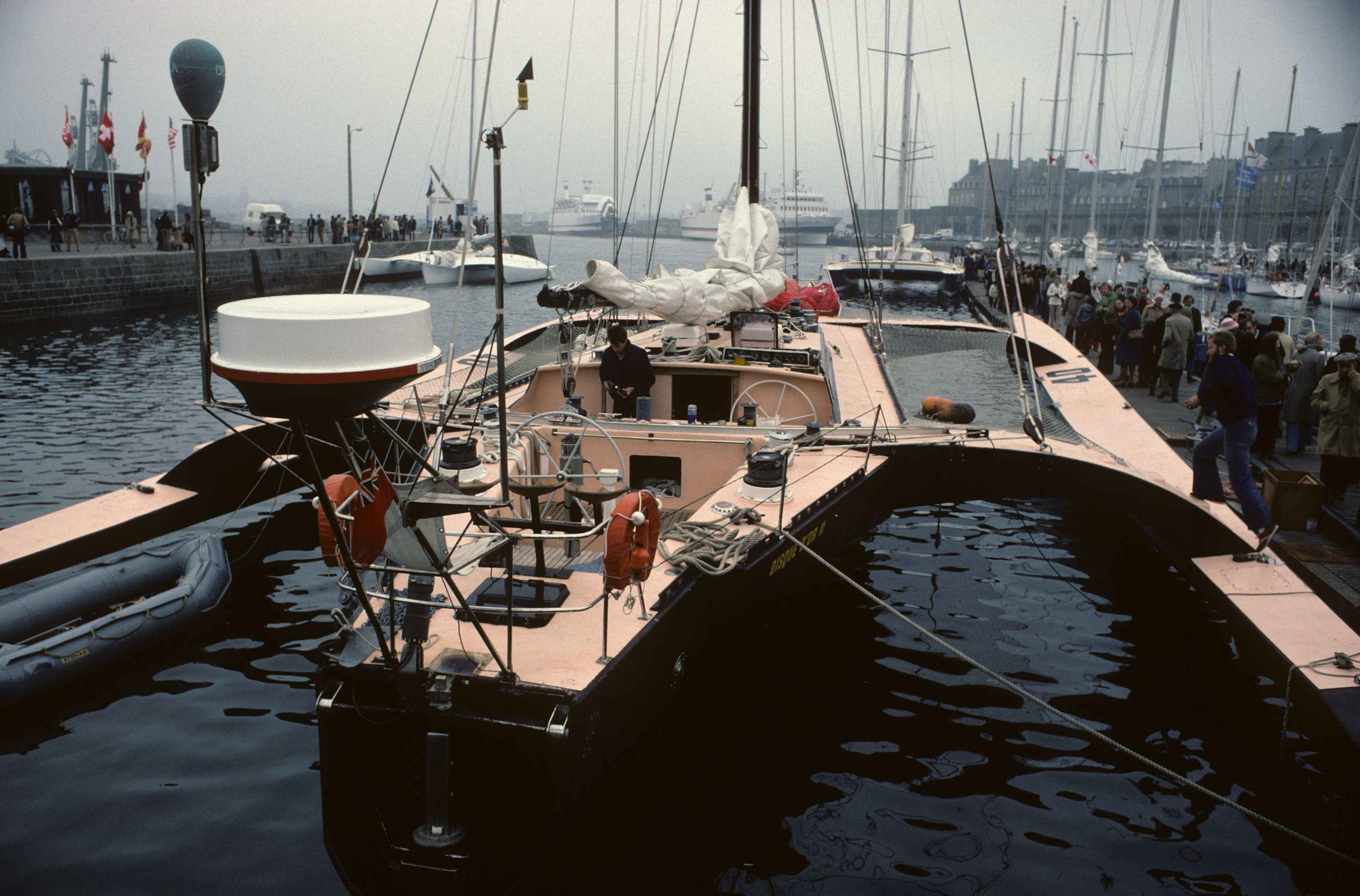

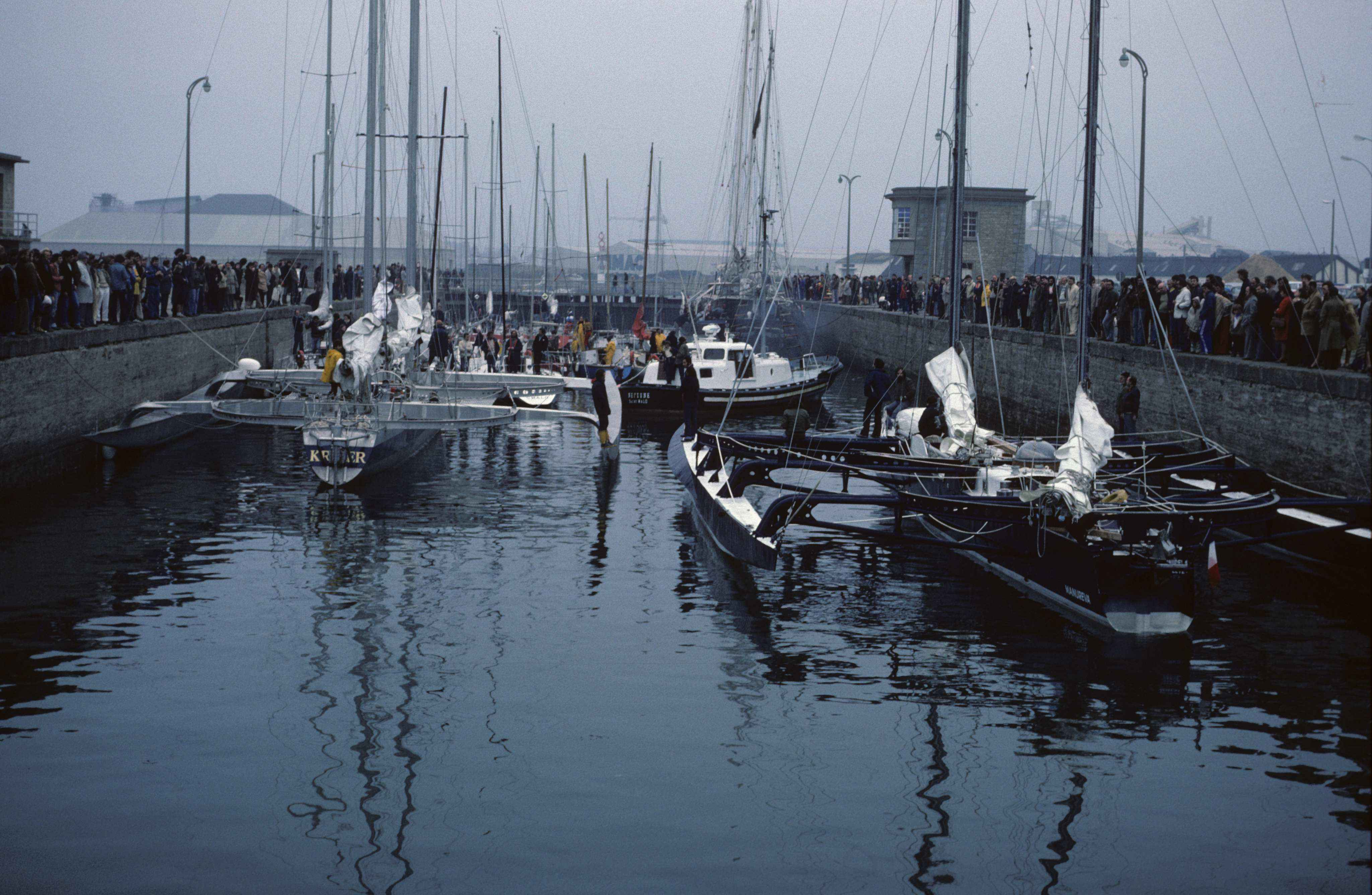

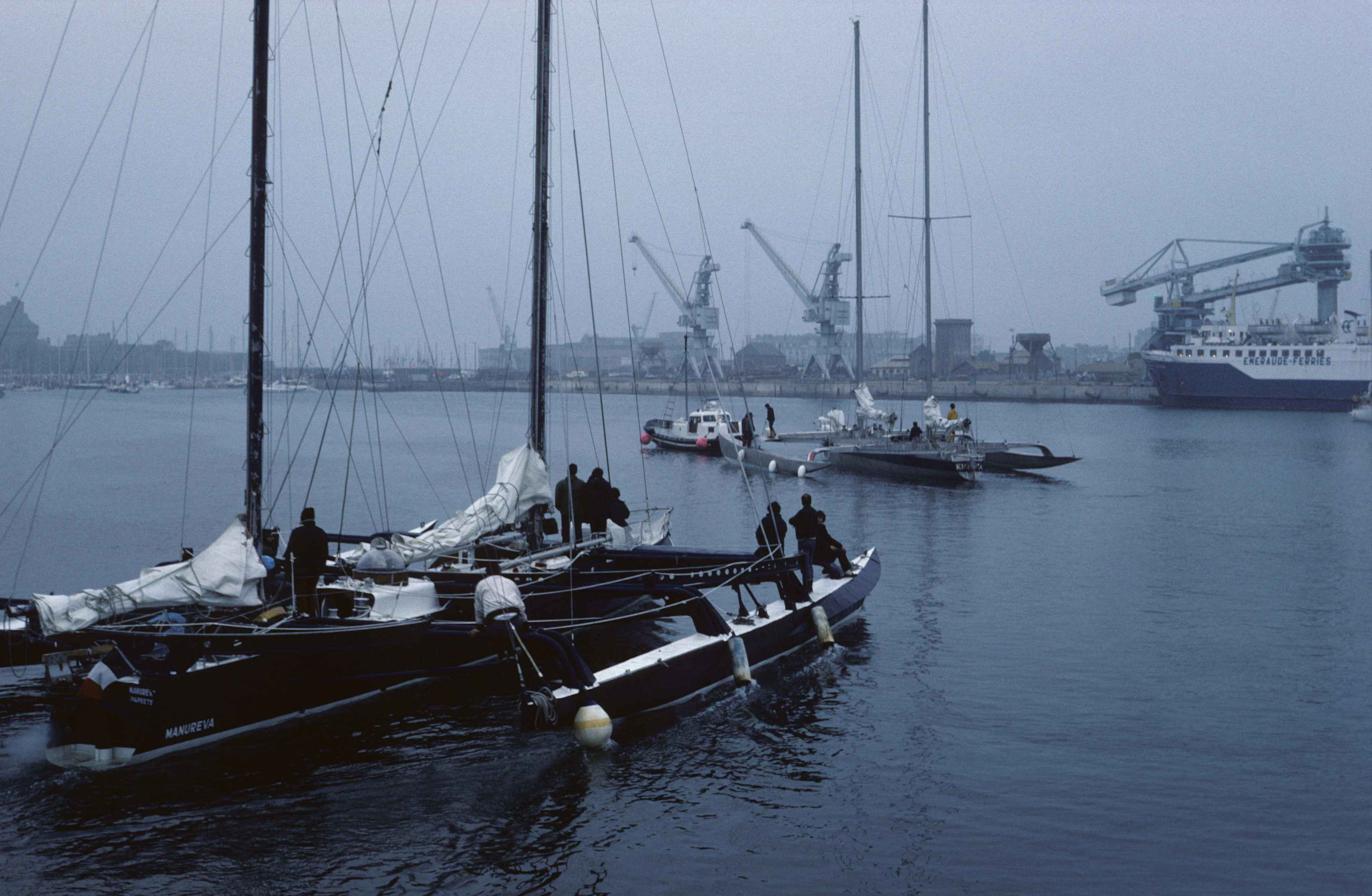

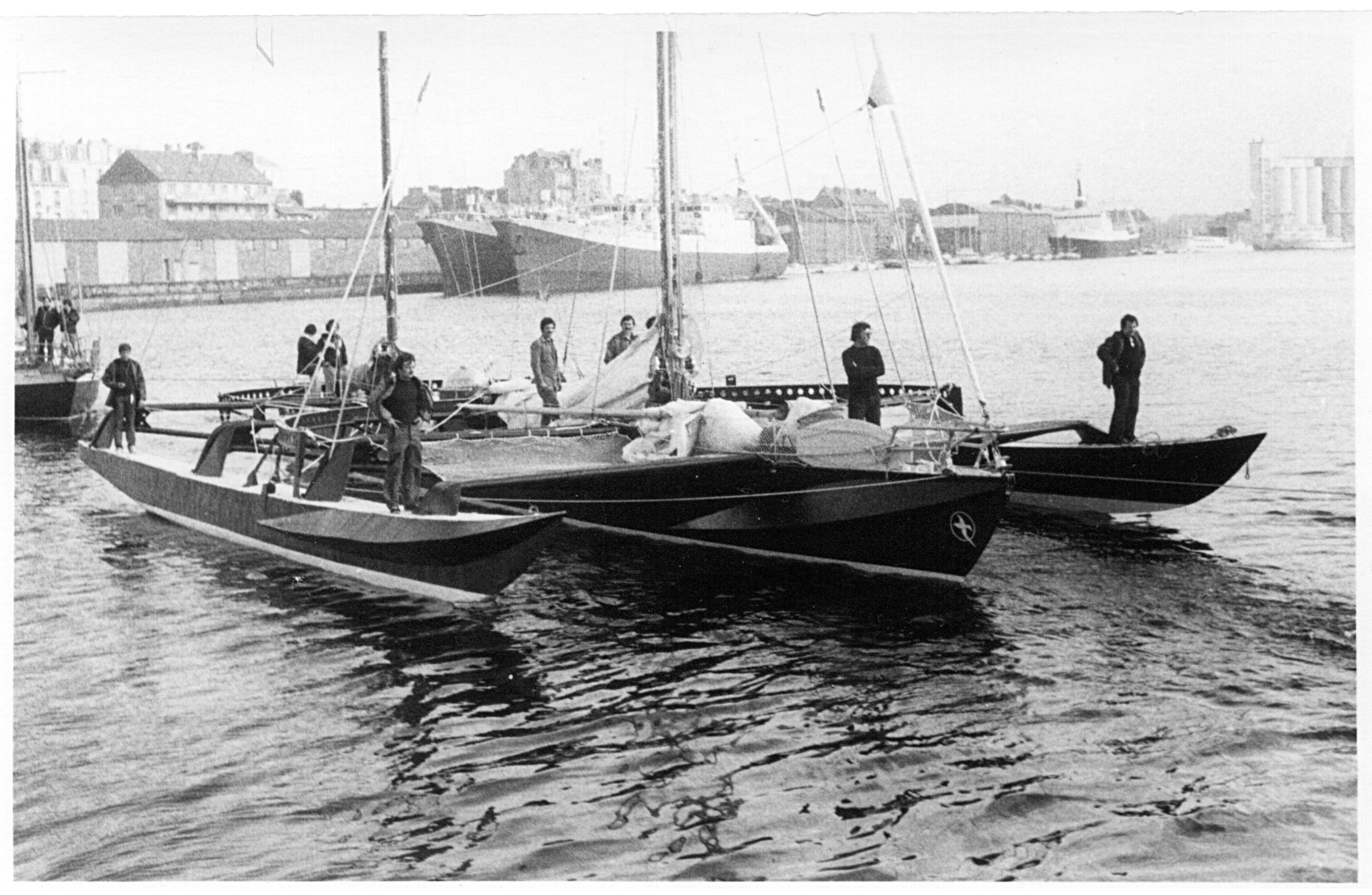

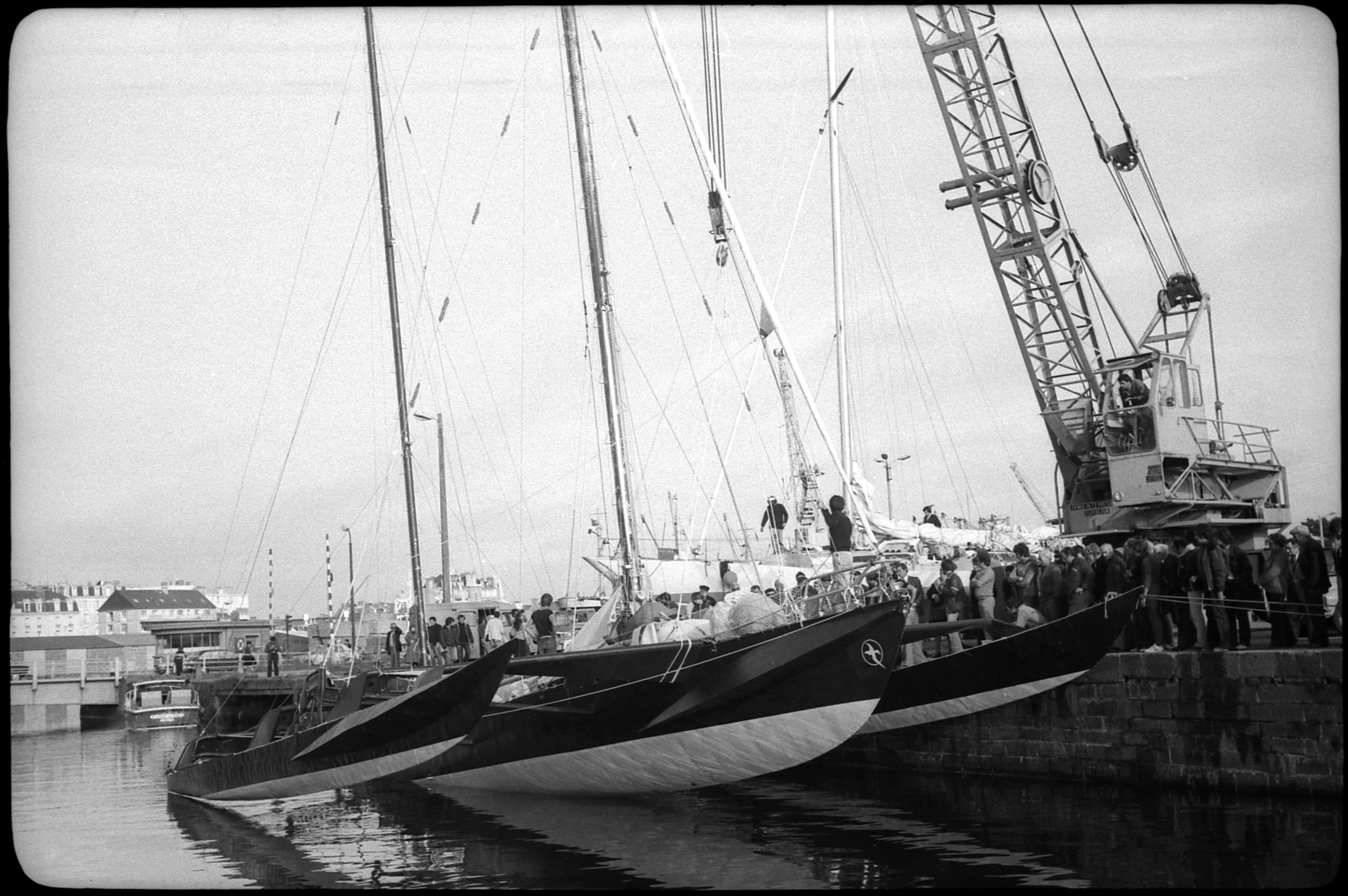

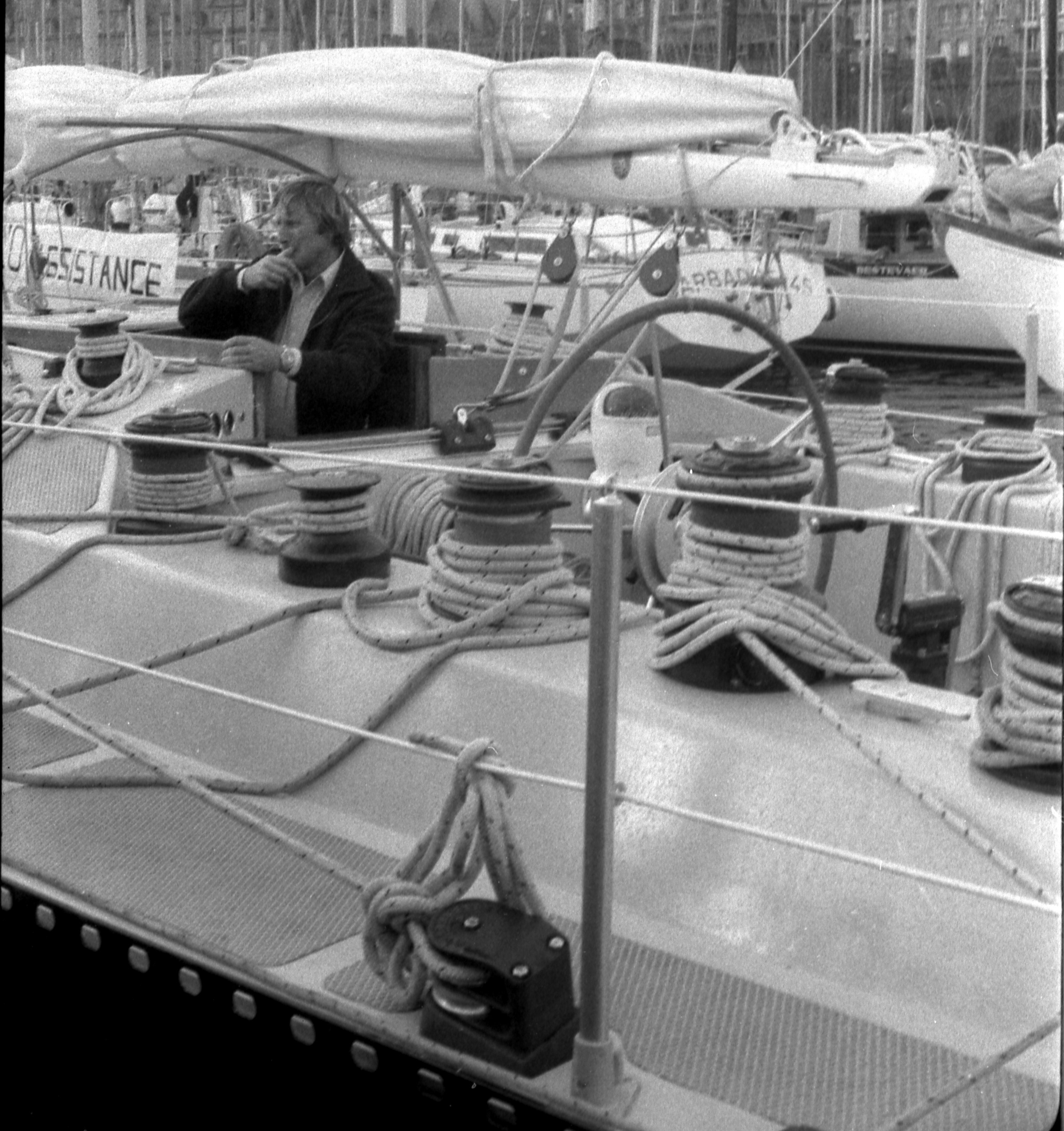

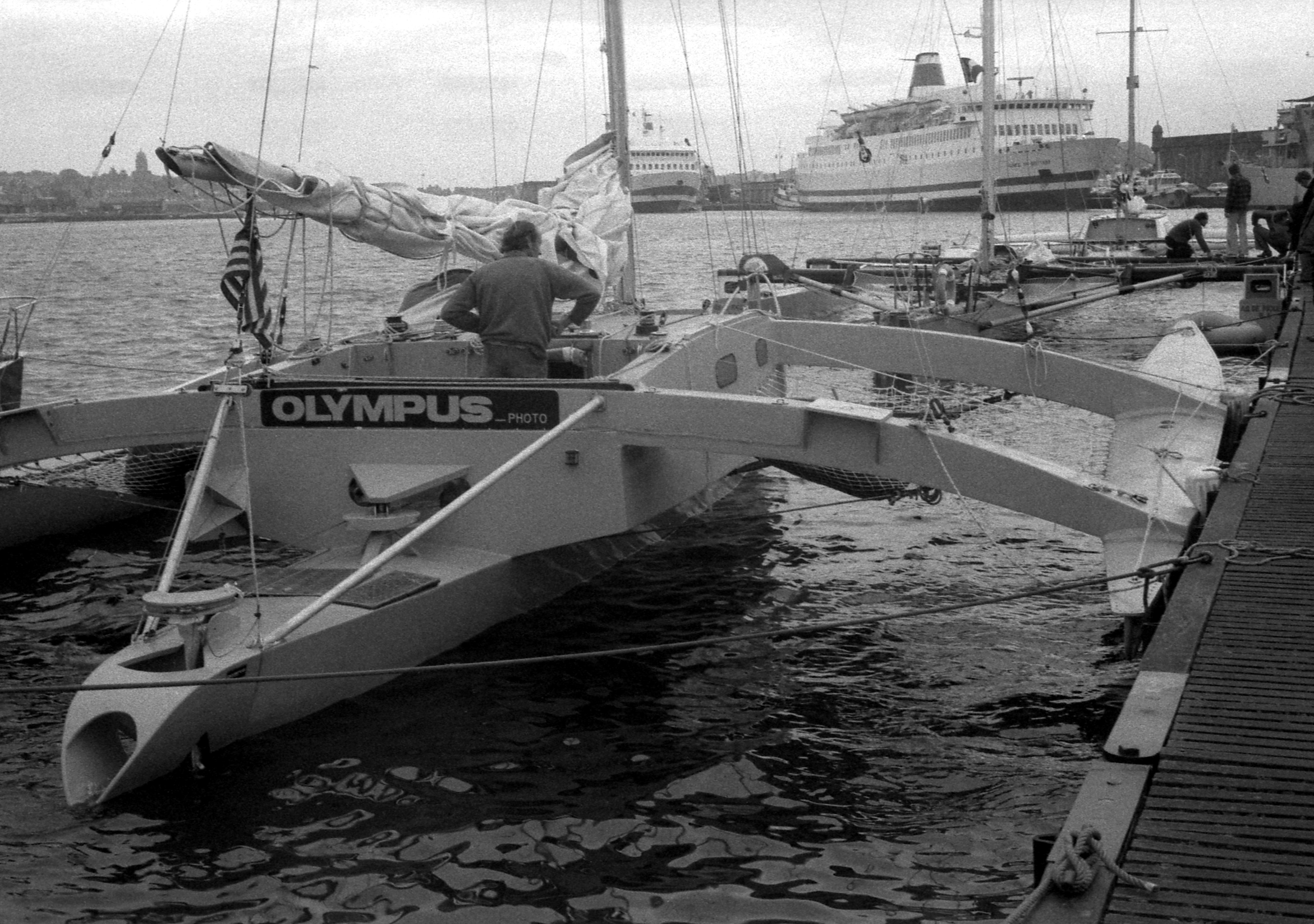
Mike Birch - Olympus

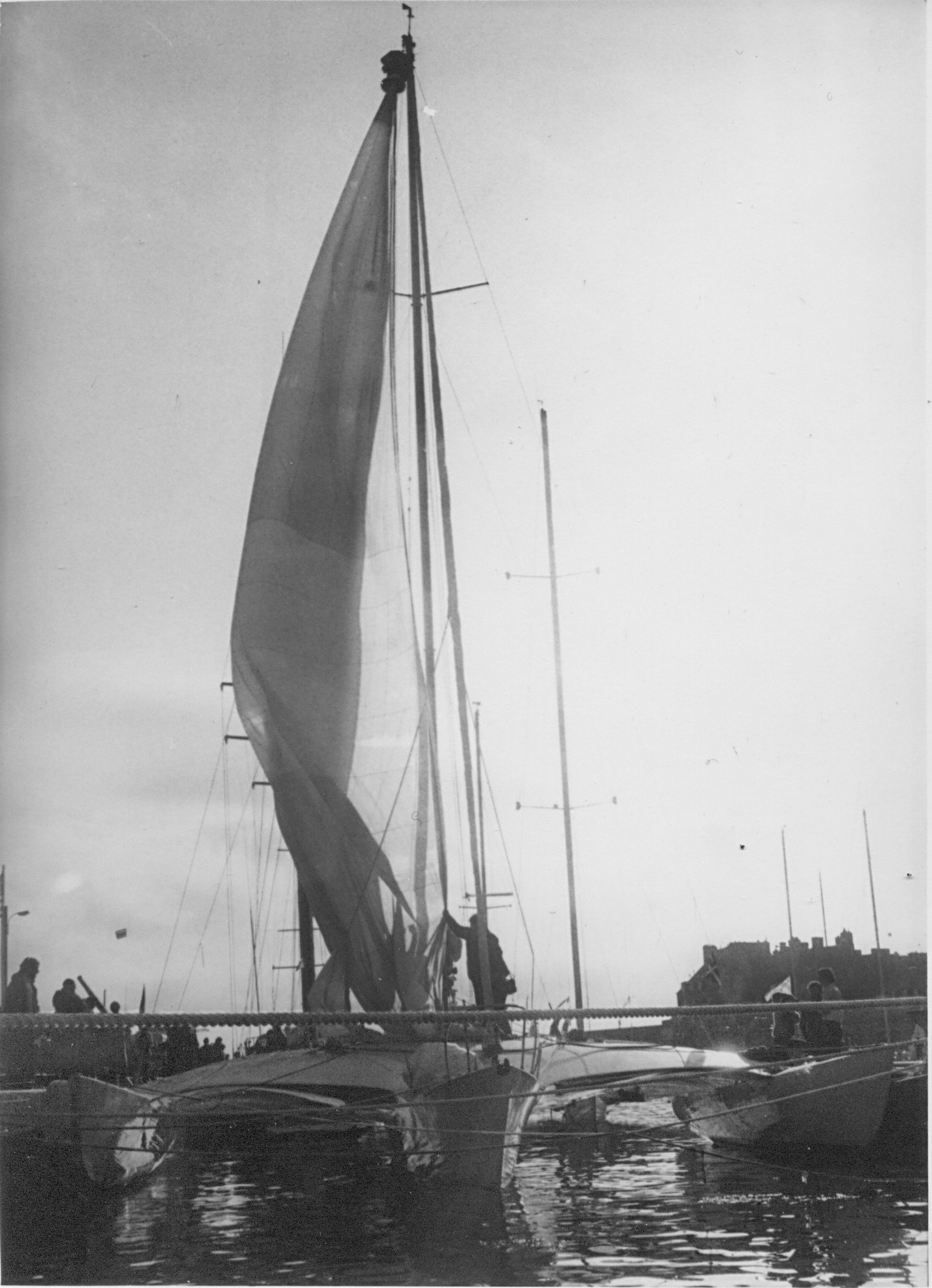

== Results ==
Pos	Sail No.	Boat name	Type	Designer	Year	Name / Nationality		Finish Time	Delta %	Speed	Ref.
1	39	Olympus Photo	11.48m Trimaran	Greene-Newick	1978	Mike Birch (CAN)	m	23d 06h 59m 35s	0%	6.34	
2	28	Kriter V	21m Monohull	Mauric	1978	Michel Malinovski (FRA)	m	23d 07h 01m 13s	0%	6.34	
3	20953	Rogue Wave	60ft Trimaran	Dick NEWICK	1978	Philip S. Weld (USA)	m	23d 15h 51m 32s	1.59%	6.24	
4		Kriter IV	23m Alloy Trimaran	Joubert	1978	Olivier de Kersauson (FRA)	m	24d 06h 27m 20s	4.2%	6.08	
5	157	Wild Rocket	19.17m Ketch	Auzepy Brenneur	1972	Joël Charpentier (FRA)	m	24d 20h 37m 20s	6.73%	5.94	
6	43	Arauna IV	11.58m Mono	Gilles Costantini	1975	Jacques Timsit (FRA)	m	26d 05h 09m 25s	12.55%	5.63	
7		Saint-Malo - Pointe-a-Pitre				Philippe Poupon (FRA)	m	26d 12h 52m 22s	13.93%	5.56	
8	FRA 4466	Petrouchka	14.50m Monohull	Dominique Presles	1971	Jean-Claude Parisis (FRA)	m	26d 16h 23m 29s	14.56%	5.53	
9	21	Salamandre	11.50m Monohull	Ollier	1978	Guy Delage (FRA)	m	27d 01h 39m 25s	16.22%	5.45	
10		Via Assurances				Daniel Gilard (FRA)	m	27d 21h 17m 10s	19.73%	5.29	
11		X.Périmental				Florence Arthaud (FRA)	f	27d 21h 36m 56s	19.79%	5.29	
12		Gudrun IV				Jacquin Coello (ESP)	m	28d 01h 01m 13s	20.4%	5.26	
13		Quart Kriter				Yves Olivaux (FRA)	m	28d 05h 02m 59s	21.12%	5.23	
14		Bestevaer				Klaus Schrodt (GER)	m	29d 04h 38m 00s	25.34%	5.06	
15		Damnation				Yann Nedellec (FRA)	m	29d 12h 07m 07s	26.68%	5	
16		Jeremi				Jean-Jacques Vuylsteker (BEL)	m	29d 14h 29m 40s	27.1%	4.99	
17		Mutuelles Unies				Pierre Riboulet (FRA)	m	30d 02h 30m 36s	29.25%	4.9	
18		Bluamnesya				Paolo Martinoni (ITA)	m	30d 04h 36m 15s	29.63%	4.89	
19		Saint-Marguerite				Yves Parent (FRA)	m	30d 12h 29m 45s	31.04%	4.84	
20		Lady of Sailomat				Herman Brinks (NED)	m	31d 17h 30m 51s	36.23%	4.65	
21		Barbados				Jean-Pierre Barrault (FRA)	m	31d 17h 27m 45s	36.22%	4.65	
22		Journal de Mickey				Yves Le Cornec (FRA)	m	31d 21h 30m 00s	36.94%	4.63	
23		Logo				Aline Marchand (FRA)	m	31d 08h 30m 00s	34.62%	4.71	
24		Champagne Delafon				Jacques Palasset (FRA)	m	34d 08h 30m 00s	47.5%	4.3	
TLE		Fortuna Syntofil				Pierro Nessi (ITA)	m				
TLE		Belor Avon				Antoine Di Meglio (FRA)	m				
TLE	FRA 6930	Pornichet Marine				Gwenhaël Lotode (FRA)	m				
TLE	34	Synthegral	12.6M Tri		Kelsall	Jean-Pierre Millet (FRA)	m				
TLE		Pytheas				Burg Veenemans (FRA)	m				
RET		Tanikely				Yves Gautier (FRA)	m				
RET		Lili-Aggie				Yvon Fauconnier (FRA)	m				
RET		Paul Ricard				Marc Pajot (FRA)	m				
RET		Seiko				Alain Gliksman (FRA)	m				
RET		Ville des Sables				Bruno Peyron (FRA)	m				
RET		Disque d’Or II				Pierre Fehlmann (SUI)	m				
RET		Manureva Dispa				Alain Colas (FRA)	m				
