= 2002 Route du Rhum =

Solo Transatlantic Ocean Sailing Race

Event title
- Name: 2002 Route du Rhum
- Edition: 7th Edition
- Sponsor: La Banque Postale
- Host: Pen Duick SAS

Event details
- Start location: St Malo (FRA)
- Finish location: Guadeloupe
- Course: Solo Non-Stop Transatlantic Race
- Dates: Starts 2002
- Yachts: 58 Boats

Competitors
- Competitors: 58 Sailors
- Competing nations: AUS 1, BEL 1, CAN 1, FRA 48, GBR 4, ITA 1 SUI 2

Results
- Line honours: Michel Desjoyeaux - Géant

Classes
- Class 1: ORMA 60
- Class 2: Multi
- Class 3: IMOCA 60
- Class 4: Class 1 Mono
- Class 5: Class 2 Mono
- Class 6: Class 3 Mono

The Route du Rhum is a single person transatlantic race the 2002 race was the 7th edition and had seven classes with 58 boats taking part.

== Results ==
=== ORMA 60 Multihulls ===
Pos	Sail No.	Boat name	Year	Designer	Name / Nationality		Finish Time	Delta %	Speed Rhum	Ref.
1		Géant	2002	VPLP	Michel Desjoyeaux (FRA)	m	13d 07h 53m 00s	0%	11.07	
2		Biscuit La Trinitaine	Aug. 1998	Nigel Irens	Marc Guillemot (FRA)	m	13d 19h 36m 18s	3.66%	10.68	
3		Banque Populaire IV	Mar. 2002	Nigel Irens; Cabaret	Lalou Roucayrol (FRA)	m	14d 07h 01m 00s	7.23%	10.33	
RET		Groupama	1998	VPLP	Franck Cammas (FRA)	m	Day 1 - Capsized towed to port			
RET		Banque Covefi	1990	Nigel Irens	Bertrand de Broc (FRA)	m	Day 2 - Retired due to fatigue			
RET		TIM	May. 2001	VPLP	Giovanni Soldini (ITA)	m				
RET		Gitana X	Jun. 2002	Ollier; McLane; Schmidt	Lionel Lemonchois (FRA)	m				
RET		Bayer Cropscience	Mar. 2002	Nigel Irens; Cabaret	Fred Le Peutrec (FRA)	m				
RET		Eure & Loir - Lorénove	1994	Nigel Irens	Francis Joyon (FRA)	m				
RET		Rexona Men	1990	VPLP	Yvan Bourgnon (SUI)	m				
RET		Sopra Group	Apr. 2002	Lombard	Philippe Monnet (FRA)	m				
RET		Fujifilm	2001	Nigel Irens; Marc Lombard	Loïck Peyron (FRA)	m				
RET		Sodebo	0		Thomas Coville (FRA)	m				
RET		Foncia	Apr. 2002	VPLP	Alain Gautier (FRA)	m				
RET		Belgacom	2001	VPLP	Jean-Luc Nélias (FRA)	m				
RET		Sergio Tacchini	2001	Nigel Irens; Marc Lombard	Karine Fauconnier (FRA)	f				
RET		Bonduelle	Sept. 2000	VPLP	Jean Le Cam (FRA)	m	Day 1 - Collision retired to port			
RET	23	Techno Marine	1997	VPLP	Stève Ravussin (FRA)	m				

=== IMOCA 60 ===
Pos	Sail No.	Boat name	Year	Name / Nationality	Finish Time	Delta %	Speed	Distance	Ref.
1	888	Kingfisher	2000	Ellen MacArthur (GBR)	13d 13h 31m 47s	0%	10.88 / 0	0	
2		Ecover (1)	1998	Mike Golding (GBR)	13d 22h 49m 35s	2.86%	10.58 / 0	0	
3		Arcelor-Dunkerque	1998	Joé Seeten (FRA)	16d 00h 51m 51s	18.23%	9.2 / 0	0	
4		Sill	1999	Roland Jourdain (FRA)	16d 05h 14m 28s	19.57%	9.1 / 0	0	
5		L'Héeautontimorouménos	1997	Antoine Koch (FRA)	17d 13h 17m 28s	29.42%	8.41 / 0	0	
6		Garnier	1996	Patrick de Radiguès (BEL)	18d 00h 20m 04s	32.81%	8.19 / 0	0	
7		60 ème Sud	1992	Didier Munduteguy (FRA)	20d 05h 21m 58s	49.1%	7.3 / 0	0	
8		UUDS	1992 Finot	Miranda Merron (GBR)	20d 22h 33m 57s	54.38%	7.05 / 0	0	
9		Tir Groupé - Montres Yema	1989	Mike Birch (CAN)	21d 11h 31m 08s	58.36%	6.87 / 0	0	
10		Millimages Gédéon	1992	Patrick Favre (FRA)	22d 21h 30m 00s	68.8%	6.45 / 0	0	
11		Dinan Pays d'entreprises	1992	Frédéric Lescot (FRA)	23d 13h 04m 43s	73.59%	6.27 / 0	0	
12		Ciments St Laurent Océan	1990	Georges Leblanc (FRA)	24d 06h 12m 54s	78.85%	6.08 / 0	0	
DNF		VMI	1999	Sébastien Josse (FRA)	Abandon				
DNF		La rage de vivre	1998	Loïc Pochet (FRA)	Abandon				
DNF		Temenos	1998	Dominique Wavre (SUI)	Abandon				
DNF		Virbac (0)	2000	Jean-Pierre Dick (FRA)	Abandon				
DNF		Leasecom	2002	Elie Canivenc (FRA)	Abandon				
