= Transat Québec–Saint-Malo =

River and transatlantic sailing race

Transat Québec-Saint-Malo
- First held: 1984
- Organizer: Voile Internationale Québec
- Type: offshore race
- Start: Québec
- Finish: Saint-Malo
- Length: 2,687 nmi (3,092 mi; 4,976 km)

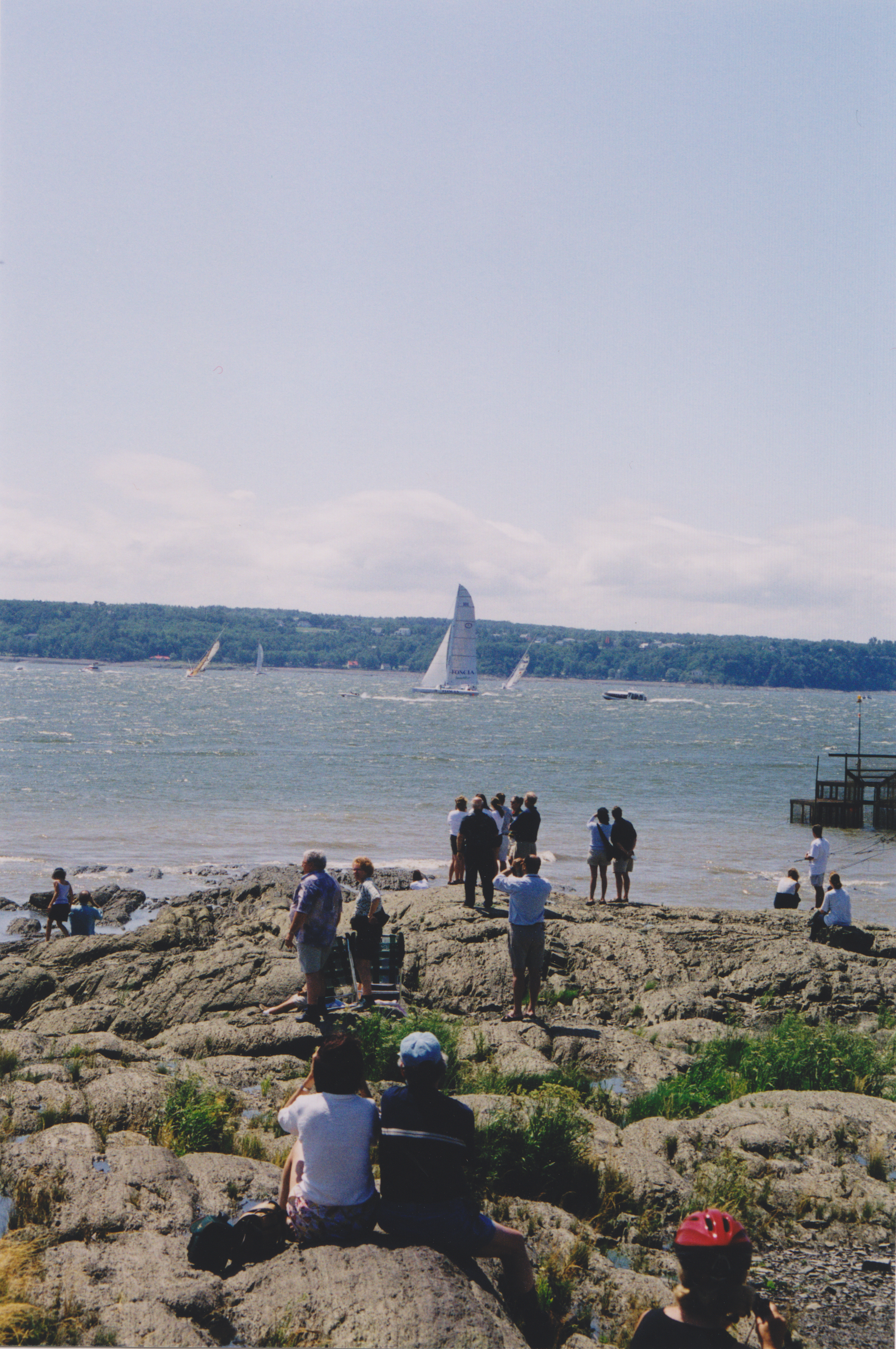
Middle estuary of St. Lawrence River, passage of couriers from Transat at Saint-Laurent-de-l'Île-d'Orléans 2000

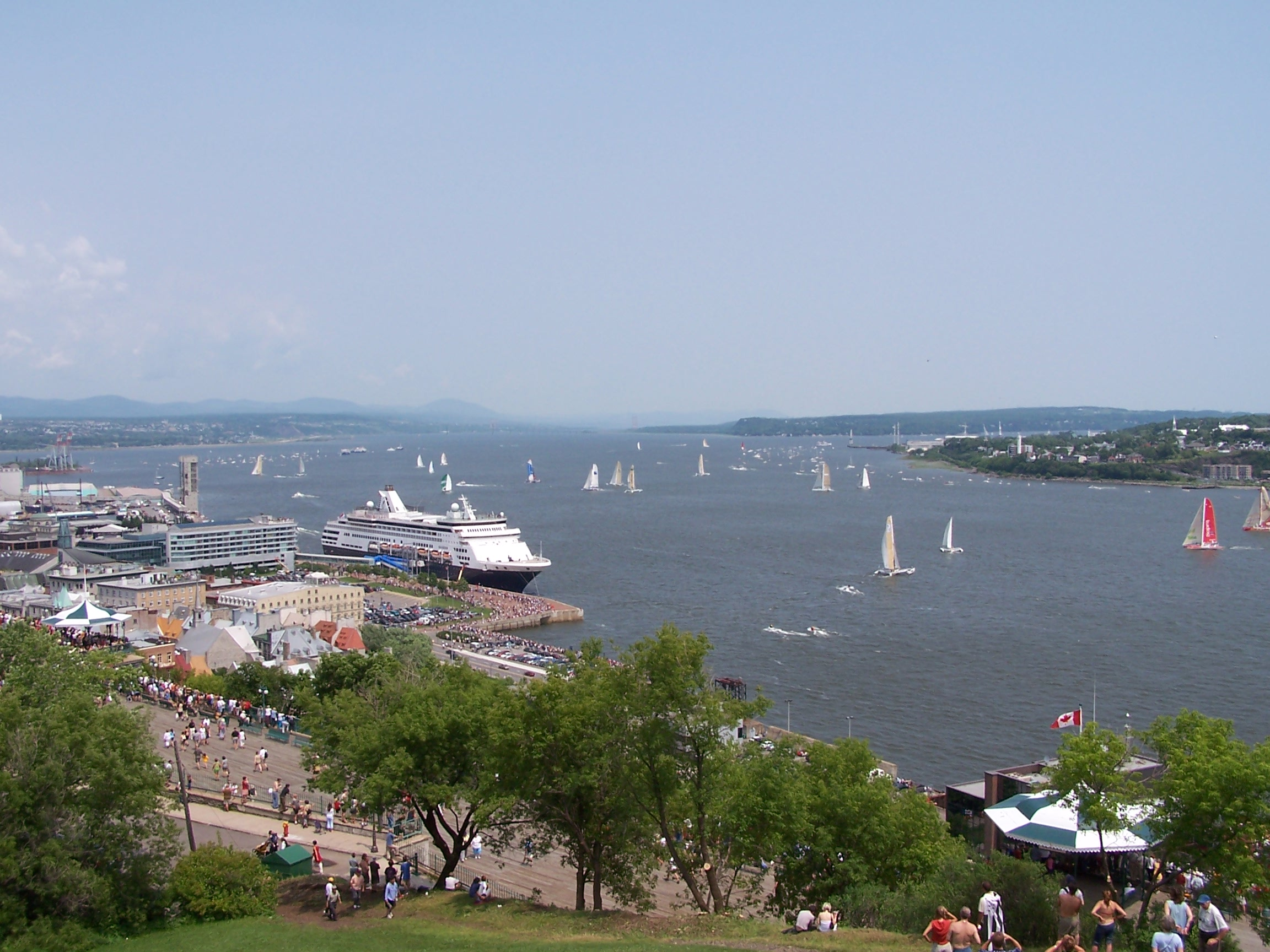
Start of the 2004 transat.

The Transat Québec–Saint-Malo is a sailing transoceanic race taking place every four years, from Quebec City, Canada, to Saint-Malo, France. The first edition, in 1984, was organized to celebrate the 450th anniversary of Jacques Cartier's voyage from Saint-Malo to Quebec. The race is opened to crewed monohulls and multihulls of 40, 50 and 60 feet.

It has two particularities: It is the only west-to-east transatlantic race at this level, and it starts by going down the St. Lawrence River for roughly 12% of its length or 376 nmi, and approximately 2,311 nmi in a straight line course from Saint Pierre Island to Saint Malo and almost 3,000 nmi when calculating for a great circle route.

In 2016 a new course record of 6 days, 1 hour and 17 minutes was set by Spindrift 2 skippered by fr:Yann Guichard and Donna Bertarelli. This new time beats by almost 2 days the previous course record held by Loïck Peyron for 20 years.

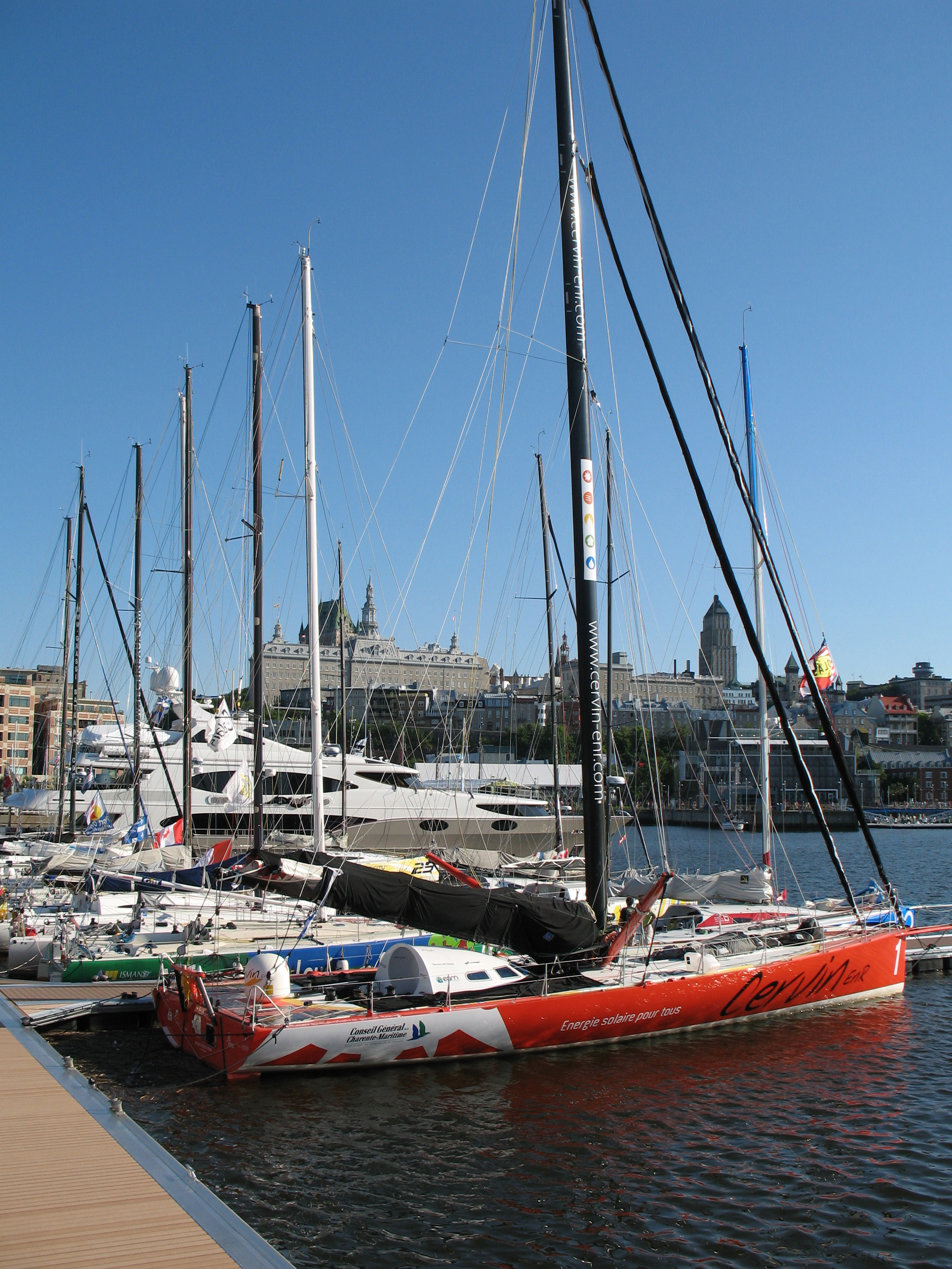
Ships moored in the Port of Quebec, in July 2008.

== 1984 ==
1. Loïc Caradec on Royale in 8 d 19 h 57 min
2. Pierre Follenfant on Charente-Maritime in 8 d 20 h 13 min
3. Philippe Poupon on Fleury Michon in 9 d 15 h 59 min

== 1988 ==
1. Serge Madec on Jet Services in 7 d 21 h 35 min
2. Loïck Peyron on Lada Poch in 10 d 23 h 40 min
3. Bruno Peyron on VSD Paca in 10 d 23 h 58 min

== 1992 ==
1. Laurent Bourgnon on Primagaz in 8 d 5 h 49 min.
2. Florence Arthaud on Groupe Pierre 1er in 8 d 7 h 17 min
3. Paul Vatine on Haute-Normandie in 9 d 14 h 18 min

== 1996 ==
1. Loïck Peyron on Fujicolor II in 7 d 20 h 24 min
2. Francis Joyon on Banque Populaire in 7 d 23 h 28 min
3. Paul Vatine on Région Haute-Normandie in 8 d 0 h 31 min

== 2000 ==
1. Franck Cammas on Groupama in 9 d 23 h 16 min
2. Marc Guillemot on Biscuits La Trinitaine in 9 d 23 h 26 min
3. Yvan Bourgnon on Bayer en France in 9 d 23 h 43 min

== 2004 ==
1. Karine Fauconnier on Sergio Tacchini in 7 d 21 h 00 min
2. Franck Cammas on Groupama in 7 d 21 h 59 min
3. Michel Desjoyeaux on Géant in 7 d 22 h 01 min

== 2008 ==
- Classe 50 feet Open (Multi50) :
  1. Franck-Yves Escoffier on Crêpes Whaou! in 11 d 3 h 19 min
  2. Pierre Antoine on Imagine
  3. Hervé Cléris on Prince de Bretagne
- Class40 :
  1. Halvard Mabire on Pogo Structures
  2. Oliver Krauss on Mistral Loisirs - Pôle santé Elior
  3. Tanguy de Lamotte on NOVEDIA Group - S.E.T. environnement
- FICO :
  1. Christophe Bullens on An Ocean of Smiles
  2. Yannick Bestaven on Cervin ENR
  3. Denis Douillez on Saint Malo Team

== 2012 ==
=== Mono Class 40 ===
Pos.	Boat			Crew	Time				Ref.
Pos.	Sail No.	Name	Year	Name	Finish Time	Elapsed	Distance Sailed	Speed	Ref.
1		Campagne de France		Halvard Mabire (FRA) & Miranda Merron (GBR)	03/08/2012 10:50	11d 17h 30m	3028,2	10,18	
2		Mare		Jörg Riechers (GER)	03/08/2012 12:21	11d 19h 1m	3094,5	10,13	
3		Eole Generation - GDF-SUEZ		Sébastien Rogues (FRA)	03/08/2012 16:04	12d 0h 44m 43s	3098,9	9,93	
4		Geodis		Fabrice Amedeo (FRA) & Armel Tripon (FRA)	03/08/2012 17:52	12d 2h 32m 50s	3036,2	9,87	
5		Roaring forty 2		Michel Kleinjans (BEL)	03/08/2012 22:13	12d 4h 53m 8s	3043,8	9,79	
6		Comiris-Elior		Thierry Bouchard (FRA)	03/08/2012 23:04	12d 5h 44m 5s	3063,7	9,76	
7		IXBlue		Stéphane Le Diraison (FRA)	03/08/2012 23:07	12d 5h 47m 50s	3036,8	9,76	
8		Jack in the box		Aloys Le Claquin (FRA)	04/08/2012 05:08	12d 11h 48m 58s	3102,1	9,56	
9		Groupe Picoty		Jacques Fournier (FRA)	04/08/2012 07:04	12d 13h 44m 27s	3071,1	9,50	
10		Red		Mathias Blumencron (GER)	04/08/2012 07:56	12d 14h 36m 2s	3033,6	9,47	
11		Partouche		Christophe Coatnoan (FRA)	04/08/2012 08:25	12d 15h 5m 33s	3087,9	9,46	
12		Bodacious Dream		David Rearick (USA)	04/08/2012 11:11	12d 17h 51m 45s	3074,8	9,37	
13		Sevenstar Yachttransport		Jean-Édouard Criquioche (FRA) / | Anna-Maria Renken (FRA)	04/08/2012 14:59	12d 21h 39m 06s	3046	9,26	
14		Latitude Neige / Longitude Mer		Aurélien Ducroz (FRA)	04/08/2012 15:32	12d 22h 12m 13s	3054	9,24	
15		EDF Energies Nouvelles		David Augeix (FRA)	05/08/2012 03:44	13d 10h 24m 25s	3047	9,45	
16		Bleu		Éric Tabardel (CAN)	05/08/2012 07:20	13d 14h 00m 08s	3111	8,79	
17		Transport COHERENCE		Benoit Parnaudeau (FRA)	05/08/2012 10:44	13d 17h 24m 02s	3037	8,70	
18		Avis immobilier		Louis Duc (FRA)	05/08/2012 12:17	13d 18h 57m 11s	3060	8,66	
19		Proximedia		Denis Van Weynbergh (BEL)	05/08/2012 22:57	14d 05h 37m 09s	3047	8,39	
20		Persévérance		Robert Patenaude (FRA)	06/08/2012 16:45	14d 23h 25m 37s	3031	7,97	

=== Open ===
Pos.	Boat			Crew	Time				Ref.
Pos.	Sail No.	Name	Year	Name	Finish Time	Elapsed	Distance Sailed	Speed	Ref.
1	Multi50	FenêtréA Cardinal 3	Erwan Leroux (FRA)	01/08/2012 01:56	9d 14h 21m 5s	3287,6	12,59		
2	Multi60	Défi Saint-Malo Agglo	Gilles Lamiré (FRA)	02/08/2012 14:09	11d 2h 34m 4s	3224,3	10,88		
3	Multi50	Vers un Monde sans SIDA	Erik Nigon (FRA)	02/08/2012 14:30	11d 2h 55m 23s	3159,6	10,86		
4	Mono50	Vento di Sardegna*	Andrea Mura (ITA)	03/08/2012 02:35	11d 15h 0m 59s	3086,9	10,39		
5	Mono65	Océan Phénix	Georges Leblanc (CAN)	05/08/2012 14:36	14d 03h 1m 16s	3124	8,55		

== 2020 ==
Cancelled due to COVID-19 pandemic.
