= 2006 Route du Rhum =

Event title
- Name: 2006 Route du Rhum
- Edition: 8th Edition
- Sponsor: La Banque Postale
- Host: Pen Duick SAS

Event details
- Start location: St Malo (FRA)
- Finish location: Guadeloupe
- Course: Solo Non-Stop Transatlantic Race
- Dates: Starts 27th October 2006
- Yachts: 74 Boats

Competitors
- Competitors: 74 Sailors
- Competing nations: BEL 1, FRA 65, GBR 5, NED 1, SUI 1, USA 1

Results
- Line honours: Michel Desjoyeaux - Géant

Classes
- Class 1: Class 1 Multi
- Class 2: Class 2 Multi
- Class 3: Class 3 Multi
- Class 4: Class 1 Mono
- Class 5: Class 2 Mono
- Class 6: Class 3 Mono
- Class 7: IMOCA 60
- Class 8: Class40

The Route du Rhum is a single person transatlantic race. The 2006 race was the eighth edition and had eight classes, with 74 boats taking part.

== Results ==
=== ORMA 60 ===
Pos	Sail No.	Boat name	Year	Designer	Name / Nationality	G	Elapsed Time	Delta %	Speed	Distance	Ref.
1		Gitana 11	2001	VPLP	Lionel Lemonchois (FRA)	m	07d 17h 19m 06s	0%	19.11 / 0	0	
2		Banque Populaire IV	Mar. 2002	Nigel Irens; Cabaret	Pascal Bidégorry (FRA)	m	08d 04h 25m 07s	5.99%	18.03 / 0	0	
3		Sodeb'O	0		Thomas Coville (FRA)	m	08d 13h 39m 02s	10.97%	17.22 / 0	0	
4		Géant	2002	VPLP	Michel Desjoyeaux (FRA)	m	08d 13h 48m 24s	11.06%	17.21 / 0	0	
5		Groupama 2	2004	VPLP	Franck Cammas (FRA)	m	08d 17h 55m 17s	13.28%	16.87 / 0	0	
6		Brossard	2001	Nigel Irens; Marc Lombard	Yvan Bourgnon (SUI)	m	09d 00h 40m 15s	16.92%	16.35 / 0	0	
7		Foncia	Apr. 2002	VPLP	Alain Gautier (FRA)	m	09d 16h 14m 40s	25.32%	15.25 / 0	0	
8	971	Region Guadeloupe-Terres de Passions	1990	VPLP	Claude Thelier (FRA)	m	11d 11h 56m 51s	48.9%	12.84 / 0	0	
9		Sopra Group	Apr. 2002	Lombard	Antoine Koch (FRA)	m	12d 00h 59m 00s	55.94%	12.26 / 0	0	
10		Gitana 12	Sept. 2000	VPLP	Thierry Duprey du Vorsent (FRA)	m	12d 14h 52m 00s	63.43%	11.69 / 0	0	
11		Madinina	1988	Giles Oliver	Gilles Lamire (FRA)	m	21d 10h 58m 50s	177.89%	6.88 / 0	0	
12		Orange Project	2001	Lombard	Steve Ravussin (FRA)	m	Capsized boat destroyed				

=== IMOCA 60 ===
Pos.	Boat name	Yr. Launch	Name	Finish Time	Elapsed Time	Note	Ref.
1	Sill & Veolia	2004	Roland Jourdain (FRA)	-	12d 11h 58m 58s		
2	VM Matériaux	2004	Jean Le Cam (FRA)	-	12d 12h 26m 58s		
3	Virbac-Paprec (1)	2003	Jean-Pierre Dick (FRA)	-	12d 20h 27m 58s		
4	Brit Air (1)	1999	Armel Le Cléac'h (FRA)	-	13d 03h 57m 17s		
5	Temenos 2	2006	Dominique Wavre (SUI)	-	13d 09h 20m 03s		
6	Artemis	2001	Brian Thompson (GBR)	-	13d 17h 32m 20s		
7	Safran (??)	2000	Marc Guillemot (FRA)	-	16d 17h 57m 26s		
8	Roxy (2)	2000	Anne Liardet (FRA)	-	17d 00h 52m 44s		
9	Maisonneuve Basse Normandie	2002	JB Dejeanty (FRA)	-	18d 11h 39m 29s		
10	Adriana Karembeu Paris	1994	Philippe Fiston (FRA)	-	22d 07h 26m 43s		
ABD	Delta Dore	2006	Jérémie Beyou (FRA)	-	Abandon		
ABD	PRB (3)	1999	Vincent Riou (FRA)	-	Abandon		

=== Class 40 ===
Pos	Sail No.	Boat name	Design	Yr	Name (Nationality)	G	Finish Time	Elapsed Time	Delta %	Speed	Distance	Ref.
1	GBR 4	philsharpracing.com	Pogo 40S1	2005	Phil Sharp (GBR)		18d 10h 21m 18s	0%	8.01	-		
2	FRA 7	Oyster Funds	Pogo 40S1	2006	Gildas Morvan (FRA)		19d 08h 52m 00s	0.37%	7.62	-		
3	GBR 15	Boland Mills	Jaz 40	2006	Ian Munslow (GBR)		21d 09h 45m 31s	0.51%	6.89	-		
4	FRA 22	Côte d'Armor Terre et Mer	Pogo 40S1	2006	Philippe Legros (FRA)		21d 18h 18m 59s	0.54%	6.78	-		
5	FRA 2	Le comptoir immobilier	Pogo 40S1	2004	Guillaume Voizard (FRA)		22d 10h 10m 40s	0.59%	6.58	-		
6	FRA 25	Appart'City	Tyker	2006	Yvan Noblet (FRA)		22d 13h 16m 09s	0.6%	6.54	-		
7	FRA 29	Chocolats Monbana	Tyker 40	2006	Damien Grimont (FRA)		22d 14h 09m 40s	0.6%	6.53	-		
8	FRA 23	Atao Audio System	Akilaria	2006	Dominic Vittet (FRA)		22d 14h 26m 17s	0.6%	6.53	-		
9	FRA 24	IXSEA	Jumbo	2006	Olivier Rabine (FRA)		22d 16h 25m 50s	0.61%	6.51	-		
10	FRA 14	Tchuda Popka II	Pogo 40S1	2006	Gwenc'hlan Catherine (FRA)		22d 22h 13m 45s	0.62%	6.44	-		
11	FRA 9	Guyader l'esprit de la mer	Pogo 40S1	2006	Géry Trentesaux (FRA)		23d 00h 40m 50s	0.63%	6.41	-		
12	FRA 3	Destination Calais	Jumbo	2005	Pierre-Yves Chatelin (FRA)		23d 03h 14m 37s	0.64%	6.38	-		
12	FRA 6	NOUS ENTREPRENONS	Pogo 40S1	2006	Jacques Fournier (FRA)		23d 10h 38m 28s	0.66%	6.3	-		
13	FRA 1	Cap VAD	Jumbo	2004	Thibaud Derville (FRA)		23d 11h 01m 25s	0.66%	6.29	-		
14	FRA 17	Jardin Bio - Prévoir	Nacira 40 Mk1	2006	Benoît Parnaudeau (FRA)		23d 12h 18m 50s	0.66%	6.28	-		
15	FRA 10	FNAIM Pays de Loire	Pogo 40S1	2006	Lionel Regnier (FRA)		23d 16h 20m 33s	0.68%	6.23	-		
16	FRA 20	Cinémas cinefil.com	Pogo 40S1	2006	Jean-Edouard Criquioche (FRA)		23d 21h 29m 05s	0.69%	6.18	-		
17	FRA 32	PACA Entreprendre	LNM40	2006	Cécile Poujol (FRA)		23d 21h 29m 46s	0.69%	6.18	-		
18	FRA 21	Lexibook	Pogo 40S1	2006	Hervé Papin (FRA)		23d 22h 47m 11s	0.69%	6.16	-		
19	FRA 26	Siegenia Aubi	Jumbo	2006	Marc Lepesqueux (FRA)		24d 01h 26m 36s	0.7%	6.13	-		
20	FRA 12	Nouvelle Calédonie	A40	2006	Yves Ecarlat (FRA)		24d 04h 03m 19s	0.71%	6.11	-		
21	FRA 27	Knauf Industries	Akilaria	2006	David Lefebvre (FRA)		24d 19h 23m 42s	0.76%	5.95	-		
22	FRA 18	Fermiers de Loué/Sarthe	Sabrosa 40	2006	François Angoulvant (FRA)		25d 10h 51m 30s	0.8%	5.8	-		
DNF	GBR 19	Kenmore Homes	LC40	2006	Nick Bubb (GBR)							
DNF	FRA 28	TMI Technologie	Pogo 40S1	2006	Joé Seeten (FRA)							
