= Loïc Caradec =

French engineer and sailor

Loïc Caradec (1948–1986) was a French engineer and sailor, born in Paris. He died in the 1986 Route du Rhum race when his catamaran Royale capsized.

Caradec sailed in the 1973–74 Whitbread Round the World Race on Grand Louis and in the 1977–78 Whitbread Round the World Race on Gauloises II.

== Biography ==
A Supélec engineer (class of '70), Loïc Caradec is one of the architects, with the Graal firm, of the maxi Catamaran Royale II, built at the Multiplast shipyard in 1982, of which he is skipper. In 1984, he won the first edition of the Transat Québec–Saint-Malo. However, during the 1986 Route du Rhum race, the boat, which had been extended to 85 feet (26 m) and fitted with a gigantic wing mast, overturned in heavy seas, resulting in the disappearance of its skipper. Two days later Florence Arthaud found the boat overturned, with no trace of Caradec.

Together with Philippe Facque, he founded Royale, a production and media company for nautical events.
