= Patrice Carpentier =

French offshore sailor and navigator

Personal information
- Nationality: French
- Born: 10 January 1950 (age 76) Falaise, Calvados

Sailing career
- Sport: Sailing

Patrice Carpentier is a French professional sailor born on 10 January 1950 in Falaise, Calvados.

He holds a BA in letters. Married with four children, he lives in La Trinidad-sur-Mer.

He writes for Race Au Large and SeaHorse Magazine. He became race director for the 2018 Golden Globe race.

== Career highlights ==
Year	Pos	Events	Class	Boat name	Note	Ref.
Round the world races
1973	3	1973–1974 Whitbread Round the World Race	Maxi	Grand Louis	Skippered by André Viant	
1977	6	1977–1978 Whitbread Round the World Race	Maxi	Gauloises 2	Skippered by Eric Loizeau	
1989	RET	1989-1990 Vendée Globe	IMOCA 60	Le Nouvel Observateur	Completed the course after autopilot issues so stopped in the Falklands	
2001	11	2000-2001 Vendée Globe	IMOCA 60	VM Matériaux	116d 00h 32'	
2005	RET	2004-2005 Vendée Globe	IMOCA 60	VM Matériaux	broken boom	
Transoceanic Races
1982	1	Route du Rhum				
1991	2	Mini Transat Race	Mini Transat 6.50			
1992	6	Transat AG2R				
2005	RET	OSTAR	Open 40s	VM Materiaux		
2008	ABD	TRANSAT QUEBEC SAINT MALO	Class40	22 - Les Entreprises Lorraines	Luc LAJOYE, Jean-Philippe TOTOT, Cora ZIMMERMAN	
2009	12	LA SOLIDAIRE DU CHOCOLAT	Class40	22 - Group 5	Crew Victor MALDONADO; 32d 19h 24m 00s	
Other Races
1981	1	Solitaire du Figaro		l'Auto-Journal		
2007	7	MORBIHAN MONDIAL CLASS40	Class40	22 - Groupe 5		
2007	4	MATONDO CONGO	Class40	22 - Centre D'accueil des Mineurs de Mvoumvou	Crew Adrien MONSEMPES, Benoit LENGLET	
2009	RET	1000 MILLES BRITTANY FERRIES	Class40	22 - Group 5	Crew Rune AASBERG	
2010	2	HAPPY BAIE! A LA TRINITE SUR MER	Class40	85 - Groupe Picoty	Jacques FOURNIER, Jean-Edouard CRIQUIOCHE, Jean-Christophe CASO, Nicolas CHARMET	

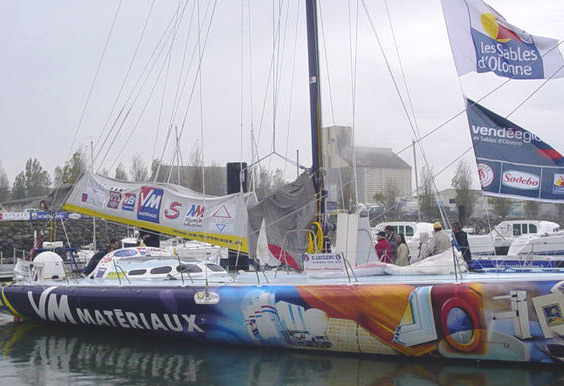
VM Matériaux
Patrice Carpentier
Departing for 2004 Vendée Globe
