= ORMA 60 =

Class of sailing trimarans

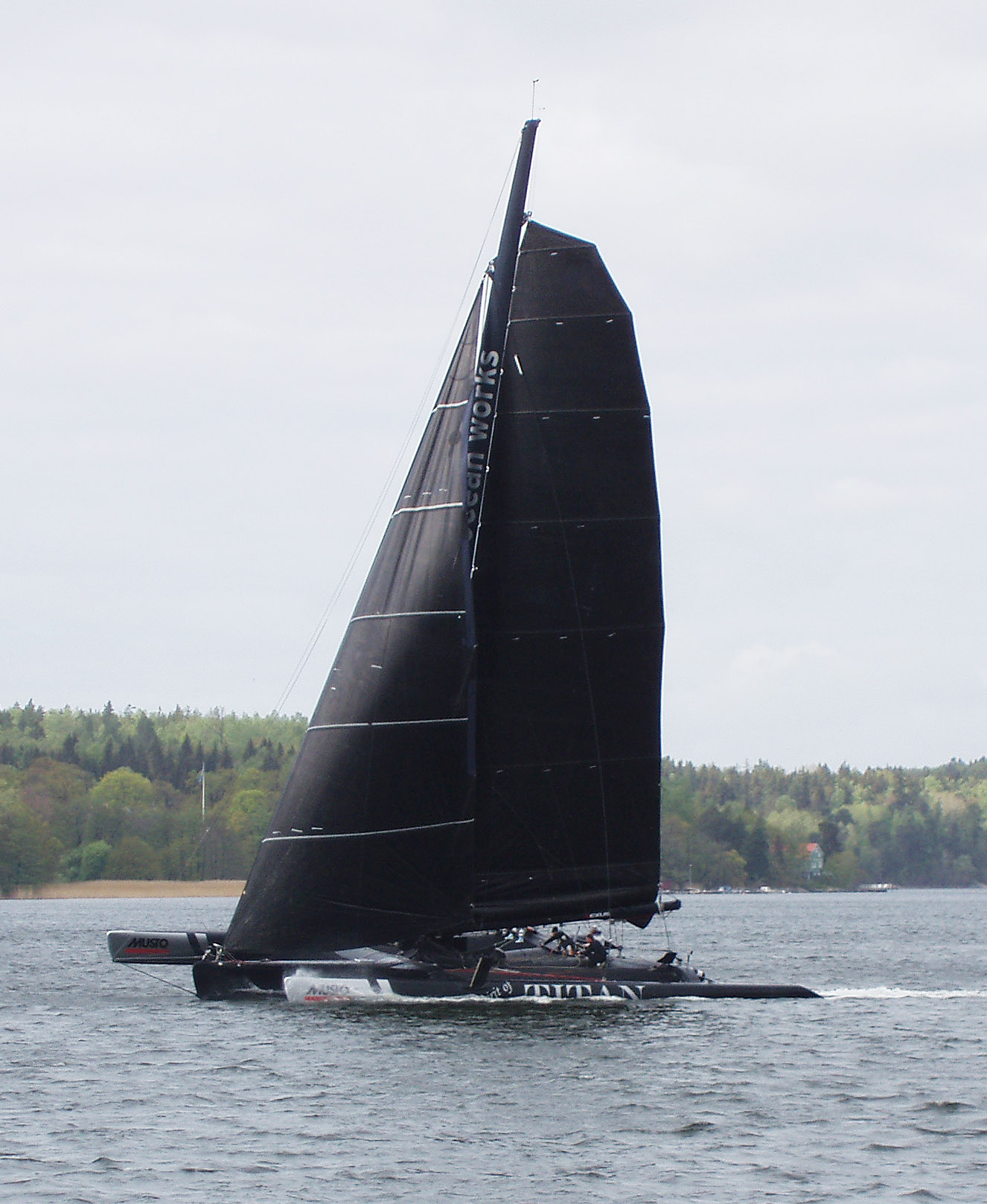
- ORMA 60 Spirit of Titan in 2009.

Hull
- LOA: 18.28 m (60.0 ft)

ORMA 60 is a class of sailing trimarans administered by the Ocean Racing Multihull Association (ORMA) that was created in 1996 by the International Sailing Federation (ISAF) within the sport of sailing. The boats were built to a box rule that permitted 60 feet length and beam and a 100-foot mast.

The class was active from 1996 to 2007. The boats built to the class rule were some of the fastest ocean going sailboats ever built, but suffered many failures at sea, including capsize. In one famous race, 2002 Route du Rhum, only 3 of 18 starters managed to complete the race. This eventually led to the abandonment of the class by sponsors. As a result, it is no longer actively managed by the ISAF. The one design Mod70 was created to continue the heritage of large blue water racing multihulls, while addressing the issues that had arisen with the ORMA 60 designs.

Several ORMA 60 boats continue to compete in handicap races. The 'first to finish' winner of the 2017 Transpac race was the ORMA 60 class boat Mighty Merloe, which set a new course record of 4 days, 7:03:30, beating the previous record by almost a full day.

Several high-profile yacht races cater to these classes, such as the Route du Rhum, the Transat Jacques Vabre, the Quebec-St Malo and the Single-Handed Trans-Atlantic Race.

== Winners of ORMA Championship ==
- 2007 : Franck Cammas on Groupama 2
- 2006 : Franck Cammas on Groupama 2
- 2005 : Pascal Bidégorry on Banque Populaire
- 2004 : Franck Cammas on Groupama 2
- 2003 : Franck Cammas on Groupama
- 2002 : Loïck Peyron on Fujifilm
- 2001 : Franck Cammas on Groupama
- 2000 : Franck Cammas on Groupama
- 1999 : Loïck Peyron on Fujicolor II
- 1998 : Laurent Bourgnon on Primagaz
- 1997 : Loïck Peyron on Fujicolor II
- 1996 : Loïck Peyron on Fujicolor II

== See also ==
- IMOCA 60
- Open 50
