= Route du Rhum =

Transatlantic yacht race

- First held: 1978
- Type: single-handed off-shore race
- Classes: Ultim, IMOCA, Multi 50, Class40, Rhum
- Start: Saint-Malo
- Finish: Pointe-à-Pitre
- Champion: Tom Laperche
- Most titles: Laurent Bourgnon (2)
- Website: http://www.routedurhum.com

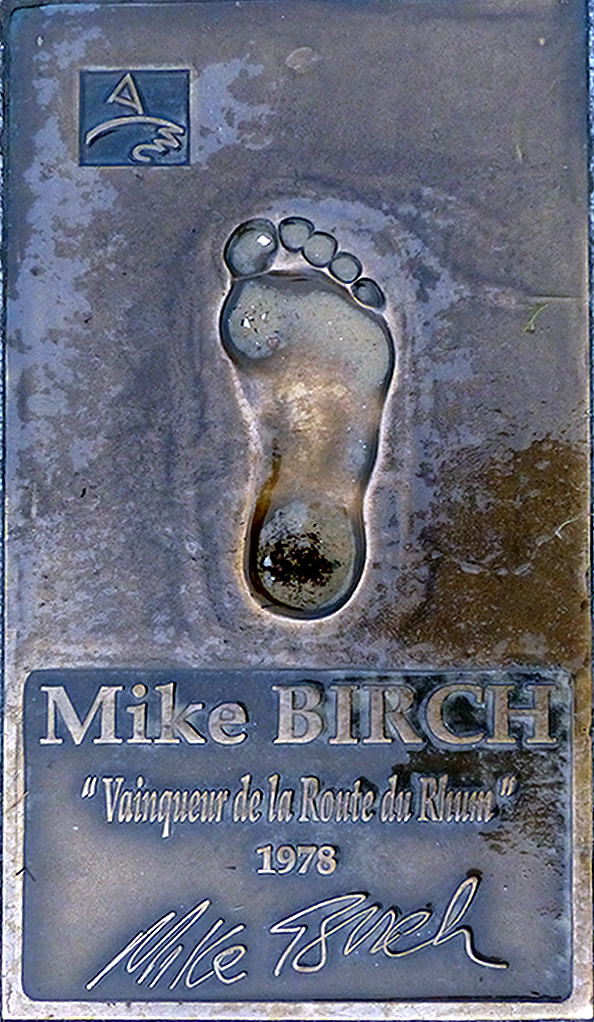
Foot impression of Michael Birch, first winner of the Route du Rhum race

The Route du Rhum (lit. "rum road") is a transatlantic single-handed yacht race, which takes place every four years in November. The course is between Saint Malo, Brittany, Metropolitan France and Pointe-à-Pitre, Guadeloupe, overseas France, in the Caribbean. The first competition, won by Canadian Michael Birch in his boat Olympus Photo by a margin of 98 seconds over second-placed Michel Malinovsky in Kriter V, was held in 1978, and was marked in tragedy by the disappearance of Alain Colas during the crossing.

The current record is 6d 13h 27m 40s set by Tom Laperche on 8 November 2026, beating out Charles Caudrelier's 2022 record of 6d 19h 47m 25s by over 6 hours.

The most recent edition started on 1 November 2026 at 1:02PM, with 118 skippers announced across six categories: Ultim, Ocean Fifty, IMOCA, Class40, Vintage Multi and Vintage Mono. Laperche crossed the finish line at 10:31PM local time on 7 November 2026 (2:31AM GMT 8 November) in Guadeloupe.

== Participation ==
| | 1978 | 1982 | 1986 | 1990 | 1994 | 1998 | 2002 | 2006 | 2010 | 2014 | 2018 | 2022 | Total |
|---|---|---|---|---|---|---|---|---|---|---|---|---|---|
| AUS | | 1 | | | | | 1 | | | | | 1 | 3 |
| BEL | 1 | | 1 | 1 | 1 | | 1 | 1 | 2 | 2 | 2 | | 12 |
| BUL | | | | | | | | | 1 | 1 | | | 2 |
| CAN | 1 | | 2 | 1 | 1 | 1 | 1 | | | | | | 7 |
| CHN | | | | | | | | | | | | 1 | 1 |
| CRO | | | | | | | | | | | | 1 | 1 |
| ESP | 1 | | | | | | | | 1 | 1 | | | 3 |
| FIN | | | | | | | | | 1 | 1 | 1 | | 3 |
| FRA | 27 | 44 | 25 | 24 | 21 | 29 | 48 | 65 | 70 | 70 | 102 | 117 | 642 |
| GBR | | 1 | 2 | | | 2 | 4 | 5 | 2 | 2 | 7 | 4 | 29 |
| GER | 1 | 1 | | | | | | | 1 | 1 | 2 | 2 | 8 |
| HUN | | | | | | | | | | | | 1 | 1 |
| ITA | 2 | 1 | | | | 1 | 1 | | 3 | 3 | 2 | 2 | 15 |
| JPN | | | | | | | | | | | 1 | 1 | 2 |
| NED | 1 | | | | | | | 1 | | | | | 2 |
| NOR | | | | | | | | | 1 | 1 | | | 2 |
| NZL | | | | | | | | | 1 | 1 | | 1 | 3 |
| POR | | | | | | | | | | | | | 0 |
| POL | | | 1 | | | | | | | | | | 1 |
| RSA | | | | | | | | | | | 1 | 1 | 2 |
| SUI | 1 | | | 1 | 1 | 2 | 2 | 1 | 2 | 2 | 2 | 4 | 18 |
| SWE | | | | | | | | | | | 1 | | 1 |
| USA | 1 | 2 | 1 | | 1 | | | 1 | | | 2 | 2 | 10 |
| Starters | 36 | 50 | 32 | 27 | 25 | 35 | 58 | 74 | 85 | 85 | 123 | 138 | 768 |
| Starters - Female | 1 | 1 | 2 | 1 | 0 | 3 | 4 | 5 | 2 | 2 | 5 | 7 | 33 |
| Starters - Male | 35 | 49 | 30 | 26 | 25 | 32 | 54 | 69 | 83 | 83 | 118 | 131 | 735 |
| Finish | 24 | 31 | 13 | 20 | 14 | 27 | 30 | 60 | 71 | 65 | 70 | 103 | 528 |

== Classes ==
| Class | 1994 | 1998 | 2002 | 2006 | 2010 | 2014 | 2018 | 2022 |
|---|---|---|---|---|---|---|---|---|
| Ultim 32/23 | | | | | • | • | • | • |
| Multihull - ORMA 60 | | • | • | • | | | | |
| Multihull - Multi 50 / Open Fifty | | • | • | • | • | • | • | • |
| Monohull - Open 60 | • | • | • | • | • | • | • | • |
| Monohull - Class 40 | | | • | • | • | • | • | • |
| Rhum | | | | • | • | • | | |
| Rhum Multihull | | | | | | | • | • |
| Rhum Monohulls | | | | | | | • | • |

== Results ==
=== Line Honours ===
| Year | Starters | Finish | Winning Sailor | Boat name | Elapsed Time | Ref |
|---|---|---|---|---|---|---|
| 1978 - 1st Edition | 38 | 24 | Michael Birch (CAN) | Olympus Photo | 23d 06h 58m 35s | |
| 1982 - 2nd Edition | 52 | 31 | Marc Pajot (FRA) | Elf Aquitaine | 18d 01h 38m | |
| 1986 - 3rd Edition | 33 | | Philippe Poupon (FRA) | Fleury Michon | 14d 15h 57m | |
| 1990 - 4th Edition | 31 | 20 | Florence Arthaud (FRA) | Pierre 1er | 14d 10h 08m | |
| 1994 - 5th Edition | 24 | 14 | Laurent Bourgnon (SUI) | ORMA 60 - Primagaz | 14d 06h 28m | |
| 1998 - 6th Edition | 35 | 27 | Laurent Bourgnon (SUI) | ORMA 60 - Primagaz | 12d 08h 41m | |
| 2002 - 7th Edition | 58 | | Michel Desjoyeaux (FRA) | ORMA 60 - Géant | 13d 07h 53m | |
| 2006 - 8th Edition | 74 | | Lionel Lemonchois (FRA) | Gitana 11 | 7d 17h 19m 06s | |
| 2010 - 9th Edition | 87 | 71 | Franck Cammas (FRA) | Groupama 3 | 9d 03h 14m 47s | |
| 2014 - 10th Edition | 88 | 65 | Loïck Peyron (FRA) | Banque Populaire VII | 7d 15h 08m 32s | |
| 2018 - 11th Edition | 123 | 70 | Francis Joyon (FRA) | IDEC SPORT | 7d 14h 21m 47s | |
| 2022 - 12th Edition | 138 | 103 | Charles Caudrelier (FRA) | Edmond de Rothschild | 6d 19h 47m 25s | |
| 2026 - 13th Edition | | | Tom Laperche (FRA) | SVR Lazartigue | 6d 13h 27m 40s | |

=== IMOCA 60 ===
| Year | Entries | Finishers | Winning Helm | Winning Yacht | Winning Time |
|---|---|---|---|---|---|
| 2002 | 17 | 12 | Ellen MacArthur (GBR) | Kingfisher | 13d 13h 31m 47s |
| 2006 | 12 | 10 | Roland Jourdain (FRA) | Sill & Veolia | 12d 11h 58m 58s |
| 2010 | 9 | 8 | Roland Jourdain (FRA) | Véolia Environnement | 13d 17h 10m 56s |
| 2014 | 9 | 7 | François Gabart (FRA) | Macif | 12d 04h 38m 55s |
| 2018 | 20 | 15 | Paul Meilhat (FRA) | SMA | 12d 11h 23m 18m |
| 2022 | 38 | 34 | Thomas Ruyant (FRA) | LinkedOut | 11d 17h 36m 25s |
2026

=== Multihull Ultime (Maxi) ===
| Year | Sail No. | Boat name | Year | Name / Nationality | Finish Time | Elapsed Time | Speed | Distance Sailed | Ref. |
|---|---|---|---|---|---|---|---|---|---|
| 2010 | | Groupama (3) | 2006 | Franck Cammas (FRA) | | 09d 03h 14m 47s | 16.16 | | |
| 2014 | | BANQUE POPULAIRE VII | 2006 | Loick Peyron (FRA) | 2014-11-10 - 05:08:32 | 07d 15h 08m 32s | 19.34 | | |
| 2018 | | IDEC SPORT | 2006 | Francis Joyon (FRA) | 2018-11-12 - 04:21:47 | 07d 14h 21m 47s | 19.42 | | |
| 2022 | | Edmond de Rothschild | 2017 | Charles Caudrelier (FRA) | 2022-11-16 - 09:02:25 | 06d 19h 47m 25s | 21.63 / 26.86 | 4399.58 | |

=== Multihulls - ORMA 60 ===
Referred to as the ORMA 50, Ocean 50 and Multi 50

| Year | Starter | Finisher | Sailor | G | Boat name | Year | Designer | Time | Speed | Distance Sailed | Ref. |
|---|---|---|---|---|---|---|---|---|---|---|---|
| 1990 | | | Florence Arthaud (FRA) | f | Groupe Pierre 1er | 1989 | VPLP | 14d 10h 08m 28s | | | |
| 1994 | | | Laurent Bourgnon (SUI) | m | Primagaz | 1990 | VPLP | 14d 06h 28m 29s | | | |
| 1998 | | | Laurent Bourgnon (SUI) | m | Primagaz | 1990 | VPLP | 12d 08h 41m 06s | | | |
| 2002 | 18 | 3 | Michel Desjoyeaux (FRA) | m | Géant | 2002 | VPLP | 13d 07h 53m 00s | 11.07 / 0 | | |
| 2006 | 12 | 11 | Lionel Lemonchois (FRA) | m | Gitana 11 | 2001 | VPLP | 07d 17h 19m 06s | 19.11 / 0 | | |

=== Multihulls - Multi 50 ===
Referred to as the ORMA 50, Ocean 50 and Multi 50

| Year | Starter | Finisher | Sailor | Boat Name | Year | Designer | Time | Speed Rhum / Water | Distance Sailed | Ref. |
|---|---|---|---|---|---|---|---|---|---|---|
| 2002 | | | Franck-Yves Escoffier (FRA) | Crêpes Whaou | | | 16d 23h 09m 42s | | | |
| 2006 | | | Franck-Yves Escoffier (FRA) | Crêpes Whaou | | | 11d 17h 28m 11s | | | |
| 2010 | | | Lionel Lemonchois (FRA) | Prince de Bretagne | | | 15d 04h 50m 48s | | | |
| 2014 | | | Erwan Le Roux (FRA) | Fenêtre A Cardinal | | | 11d 05h 13m 55s | | | |
| 2018 | | | Armel Tripon (FRA) | Réauté Chocolat | | | 11d 07h 32m 40s | | | |
| 2022 | | | Erwan Le Roux (FRA) | FRA 21 - KOESIO | | | 10d 21h 35m 52s | 13.54 / 16.04 | 4197.23 | |

=== Class 40 ===
| Year | Starter | Finisher | Sailor | Sail No. | Boat name | Design | Time | Ref. |
|---|---|---|---|---|---|---|---|---|
| 2006 | 24 | 22 | Phil Sharp (GBR) | GBR 4 | PSR | Pogo 40S1 | 18d 10h 21m 01s | |
| 2010 | 44 | 40 | Thomas Ruyant (FRA) | FRA 88 | Destination Dunkerque | Tyker 40 Evolution 2 | 17d 23h 10m 17s | |
| 2014 | 43 | 32 | Alex Pella (ESP) | ESP 123 | Tales II | Botin | 16d 17h 47m 08s | |
| 2018 | 52 | 34 | Yoann Richomme (FRA) | FRA 154 | Veedol-AIC | Lombard | 16d 03h 22m 44s | |
| 2022 | 55 | 37 | Yoann Richomme (FRA) | 182 | Paprec Arkea | Lift V2 | 14d 03h 08m 40s | |
