= Pierre Follenfant =

French offshore sailor and navigator

Personal information
- Nationality: French
- Born: 1951 (age 74–75) La Rochelle

Sailing career
- Sport: Sailing

Pierre Follenfant is a French sailor born on 1951 in La Rochelle. He competed in and finished the first edition of the Vendee Globe on his boat Charente Maritime. Before doing the race he raced extensively on his catamarans Charente Maritime 1 & 2.
