= Laurent Bourgnon =

Swiss sailor, skipper and navigator

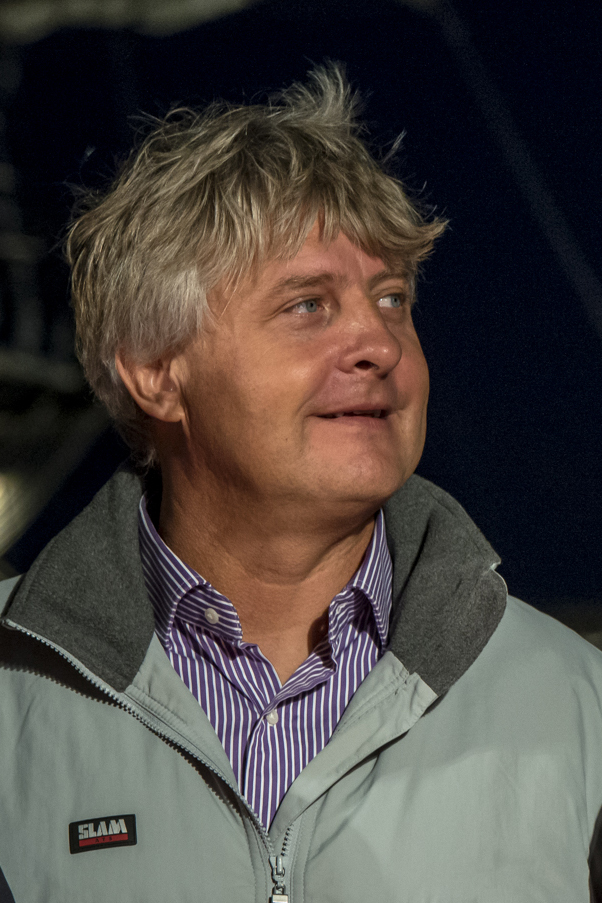

Personal information
- Nationality: Swiss
- Born: 16 April 1966 La Chaux-de-Fonds
- Died: June 24, 2015 (aged 49) Toau Atoll, French Polynesia.

Sport

Sailing career
- Class: ORMA 60

Laurent Bourgnon (April 16, 1966 – June 24, 2015) was a Swiss sailor and motorsports enthusiast. He was adept at offshore sailing, winning both the prestigious transatlantic races, the Route du Rhum in 1994 and 1998 and the Transat Jacques-Vabre in 1997. He did a lot of his racing alongside his brother and fellow adventurer Yvan Bourgnon. He was born on 16 April 1966 in La Chaux-de-Fonds and disappeared after a diving accident on 24 June 2015 in Toau Atoll, French Polynesia.

== Biography ==
Laurent Bourgnon was a multidisciplinary as a sailor, airplane and helicopter pilot, mechanic and developer, engineer and creator.

At the age of four, Laurent Bourgnon took his first steps on his parents' sailboat for a two-year trip to the Caribbean, then they left for three years from 13 to 16 years old, going around the world with their family. After crossing the Atlantic in 1986 at the age of 20 on a beach machine (Hobie Cat 18 of 5.40 m), Laurent Bourgnon embarked on the competition.

He was the winner of the biggest transoceanic events on his Primagaz trimaran including two Routes du Rhum, the Twostar, the Transat Jacques-Vabre, the Québec-Saint-Malo and many other events.

He also applied his aeronautical expertise to develop the MCR 01, a two-seater travel aircraft notable for its high speed and extended range.

On June 24, 2015, he went missing during a dive in French Polynesia in the lagoon of Toau Atoll. The people on the support boat did not see him return to the surface and alerted the emergency services. The search (by helicopter and boats) was called off on the evening of June 28, after 4 days. According to the MRCC Polynesia "The most likely hypothesis is that he was carried to the bottom by a current coming out in a pass."

A Documentary entitled "The uncommon destiny of the Bourgnon brothers, icons of sailing" was produced in 2018.

== Sailing achievements ==
=== 1986 ===
- Transatlantic Hobie Cat 18 beach catamaran with Fred Giraldi

=== 1987 ===
2nd in the Mini Transat 6.50, winner of the 2nd stage on a production boat against the faster prototypes

=== 1988 ===
Winner of the Solitaire du Figaro on his first attempt, the youngest of the competitors with one of the oldest boats

=== 1994 ===
- record for solo sailing across the North Atlantic on Primagaz in 7 days, 2 hours, 34 minutes and 42 seconds
- winner of the Route du Rhum
- record distance sailing in 24 hours alone on Primagaz with 540 nautical miles

=== 1997 ===
- winner of the Transat Jacques-Vabre

=== 1998 ===
- winner of the Route du Rhum

== Motorsport achievements ==
- 1999: First participation in the Dakar Rally
- 2000: 13th in the Dakar Rally
- 2001: 10th in the Dakar Rally
- 2002: 13th in the Dakar Rally
- 2003: 24th in the Dakar Rally in buggy
- 2004: 23rd in the Dakar Rally in buggy
- 2005: Dakar Rally in buggy (abandoned)
- 2008: 9th Rally Tunisia
