= Philippe Poupon =

French offshore sailor and navigator

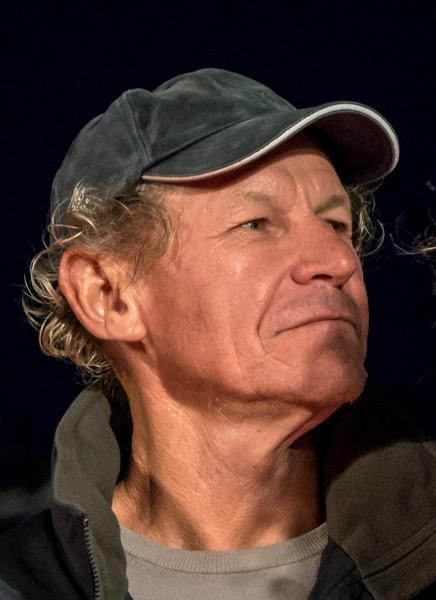

Personal information
- Nationality: French
- Born: 23 October 1954 (age 71)

Sailing career
- Sport: Sailing
- Class: IMOCA 60

Philippe Poupon, is a French professional offshore yachtsman, born on 23 October 1954 in Quimper, France. He competed in the 1989–1990 Vendée Globe where he was rescued by Loick Peyron. He then went on to finish 3rd in the 1992–1993 Vendée Globe which is the pinnacle solo round-the-world race. He is one of the most successful sailors with three Figaro wins to his credit, winner of the Ostar, the Route du Rhum, the Route of Discovery, the record of the Atlantic. His early experience was as crew for Eric Tabarly onboard Pen Duick VI for the 1977–1978 Whitbread Round the World Race. Since 2009 he has embarked on his boat Fleur Australe on an expedition aimed at raising public awareness of the protection of the oceans.
