= Mike Birch =

Canadian navigator (1931–2022)

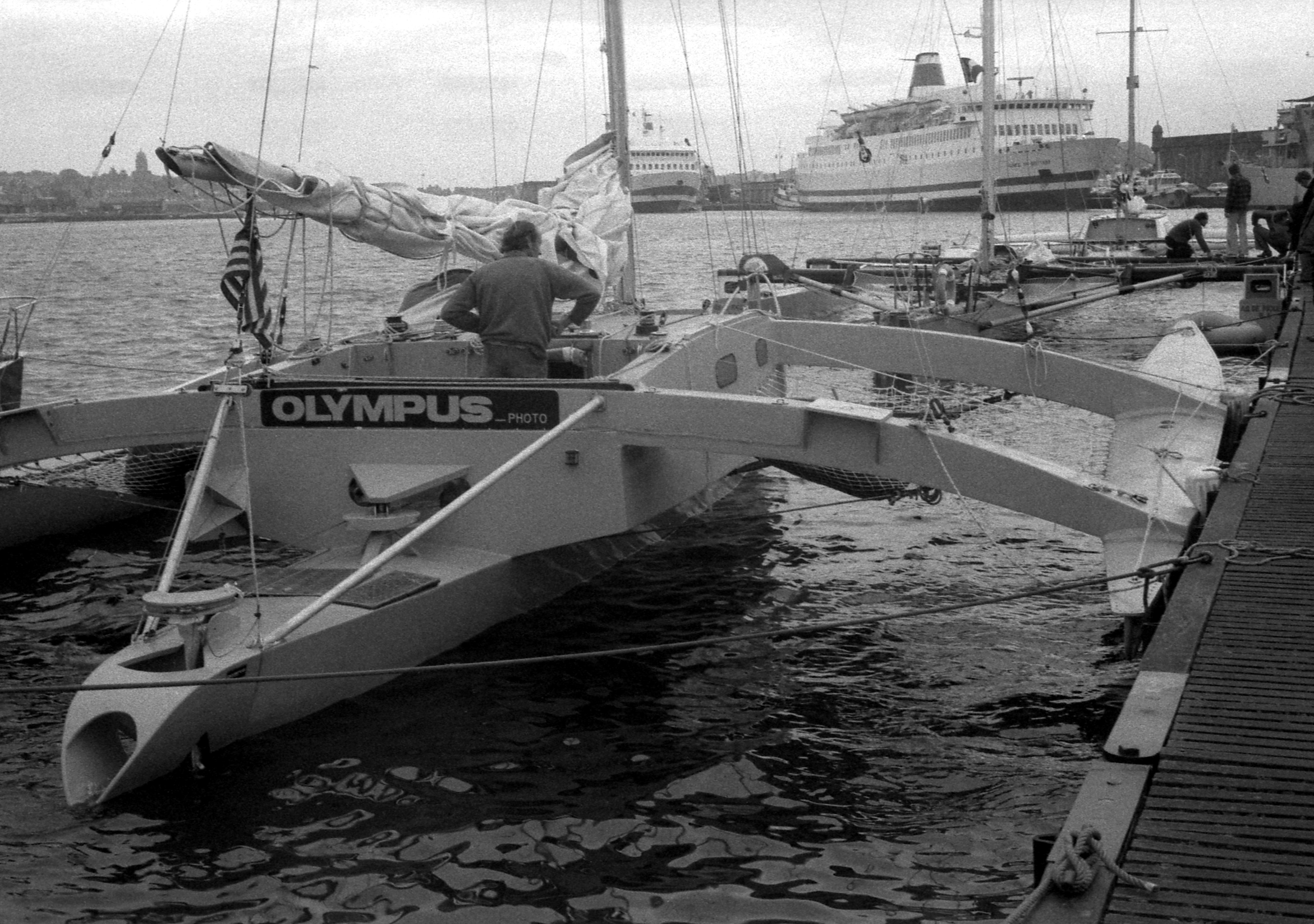
- Birch in the cockpit of the Olympus Photo
- Born: 1 November 1931; Vancouver, British Columbia, Canada
- Died: 26 October 2022 (aged 90); Brech, France
- Occupation: Navigator

Mike Birch (1 November 1931 – 26 October 2022) was a Canadian navigator.

== Biography ==
Birch was born in Vancouver, British Columbia. He began sailing later in his life, but gained notoriety in the 1976 OSTAR where he came in second on a 30' trimaran "The Third Turtle" beating the 236' "CLUB MEDITERRANEE". He continued his surprising success as a solo sailor in the inaugural Route du Rhum in 1978. His sailboat, the Olympus Photo, a 12-meter trimaran, caught up with the larger Kriter V of Michel Malinovsky late in the race.

Birch's victory at the Route du Rhum would begin the reign of the multihull, particularly following the death of Alain Colas. He continued a long career racing offshore, completing his final race at the Transat Jacques Vabre in 2007, where he finished in 16th place.

Birch died in Brech on 26 October 2022, at the age of 90.
