= IDEC 2 =

Ocean racing trimaran

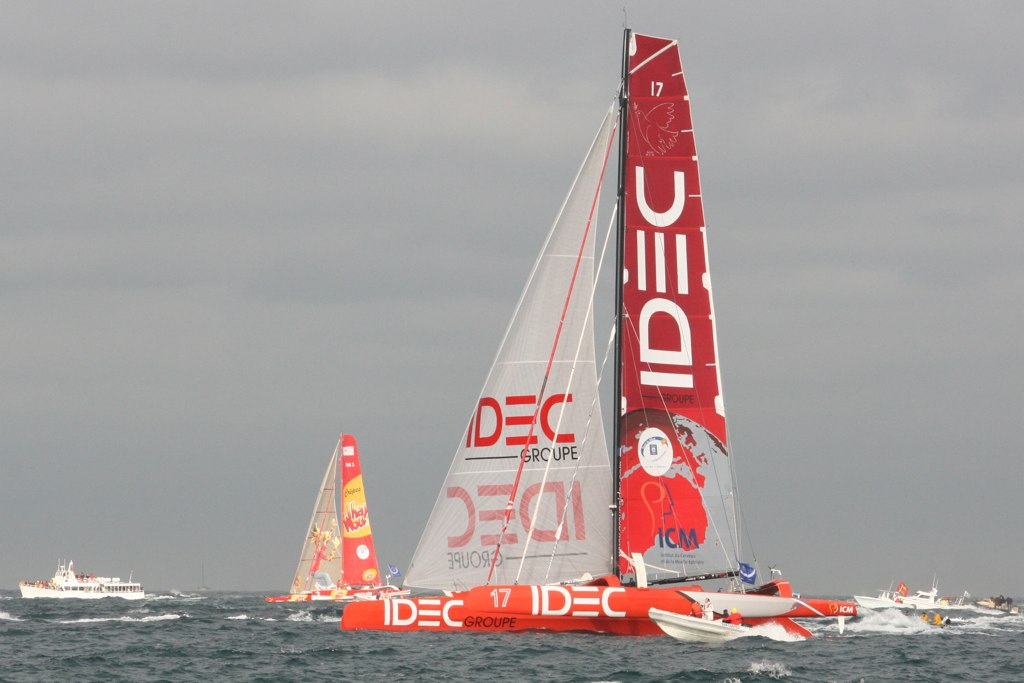
- Designer(s): Nigel Irens & Benoit Cabaret
- Builder: Marsaudon Composites; Lorient, France
- Launched: 2007

Specifications
- Displacement: 11 t (11 long tons; 12 short tons)
- Length: 29.70 m (97.4 ft) (LOA); 24.5 m (80 ft) (LOH)
- Beam: 16.5 m (54 ft)
- Mast height: 32 m (105 ft)
- Sail area: 350 m^{2} (3,800 sq ft) (upwind); 520 m^{2} (5,600 sq ft) (downwind)

IDEC 2 is an ocean racing trimaran skippered by Francis Joyon and sponsored by groupe IDEC. She is currently named Qingdao China.

== As IDEC 2 ==
The main goal of Francis Joyon was to regain the single-handed round-the-world record from Ellen MacArthur. The yachtsman from Locmariaquer did so, in January 2008, beating her record by more than two weeks, and even managed to get the second best time around the world behind Orange II and in front of crewed sailboats such as Cheyenne, Geronimo and Orange.

== As Qingdao China ==
By 2016 the IDEC 2 had been sold and renamed Qingdao China. She was used by Chinese sailor Guo Chuan in an attempt to break the world record for a solo crossing of the Pacific, sailing from San Francisco to Shanghai. Chuan set sail from San Francisco on 18 October 2016, but the US Coast Guard was notified after they lost contact with him on 25 October some 600 miles off the Hawaiian island of Oʻahu. A team from the USS Makin Island reached the yacht on 27 October, finding it adrift with a damaged sail, with no sign of Chuan, but with his lifejacket still aboard. The crew removed his personal belongings, and left the yacht for later salvage.

== Records ==
- 2007 24 hours distance record single-handed: 616.07 nautical miles (1,140.96 km) (avg speed 47.54km/h)
- 2007 Channel crossing record (Cowes to Dinard), the 19 August 2007, in 6h 23m and 36s, at an average speed of 21.58 knots (39.97 km/h).
- 2008 Around the world record single-handed, non-stop and with no assistance : 57d 6h 23m 6s, with an average speed of 21.6 knots (40.0 km/h). It also beats the intermediate single-handed records on its way.
- 2008 Transatlantic record single-handed from Plymouth to Newport, in 9d 20h 35m.
