= Around the world sailing record =

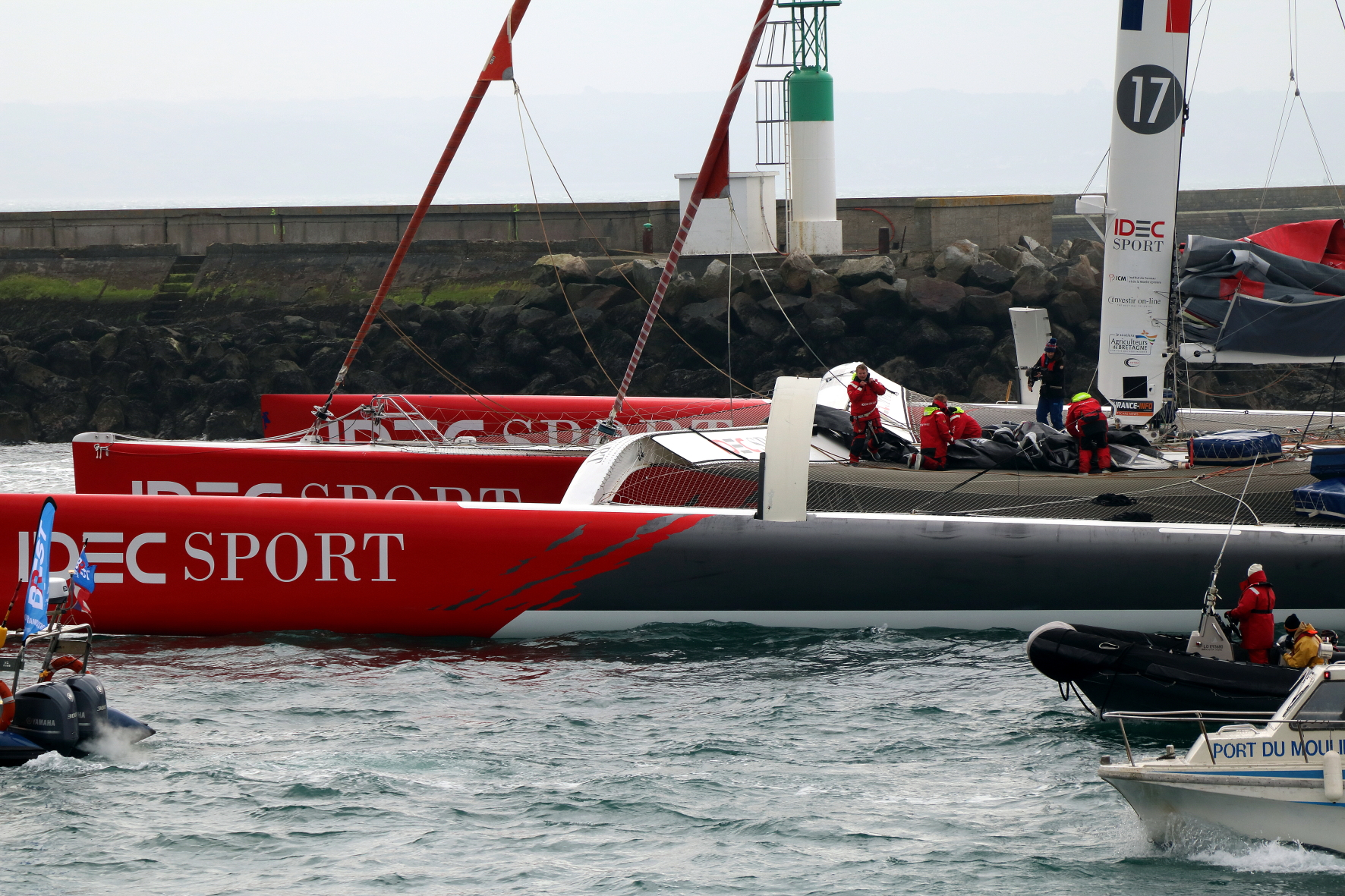
IDEC 3, former outright record holder at 40 days, 23 hours, 30 minutes and 30 seconds.

The first definitive around the world sailing record for circumnavigation of the world can be attributed to the surviving crew of Ferdinand Magellan's expedition, including the last captain Juan Sebastián Elcano who completed their journey in 1522.

Although not in a single voyage, Magellan was technically the first to circumnavigate the globe since he was killed in the Mactan Islands and while in the Kingdom of Portugal's service, Magellan had already reached the Malay Archipelago in Southeast Asia on previous voyages traveling east (from 1505 to 1511–1512). By visiting this area again but now traveling west, Magellan achieved a nearly complete personal circumnavigation of the globe for the first time in history.

Magellan's slave Enrique of Malacca may have also been the first, as he accompanied Magellan on all his voyages, including the voyage that circumnavigated the world between 1519 and 1521. On 1 May he left in Cebu, with the presumed intention to return to his home island, and there is nothing more said of Enrique in any document.

If he succeeded in returning to his home before July 1522, he would have been the first person to circumnavigate the world and return to his starting point. According to documents written by Maximilianus Transylvanus and Antonio Pigafetta, Elcano and his sailors were the first to circumnavigate the globe. Enrique is only documented to have traveled with Magellan from Malacca to Cebu in two segments—from Malacca to Portugal in 1511 and from Spain to Cebu in 1519–1521. The distance between Cebu and Malacca is 2500 km (approximately 20 degrees of longitude), which is left to complete the circumnavigation. It is not known if he ever had a chance to complete a circumnavigation, but it would have been possible: Cebu was part of the regional trade network that dealt in spices, gold, and slaves.

The first solo record was set by Joshua Slocum in the Spray (1898). The current record holders are Sodebo Ultim 3, skippered by Thomas Coville in 40 days, 10 hours, 45 minutes and 50 seconds for a crewed journey, and François Gabart with Macif in 42 days, 16 hours, 40 minutes and 35 seconds for a solo journey.

Most races or solo attempts start from Europe. Due to the configuration of the continents, sailing around the world consists of sailing on the Southern Ocean around the Antarctica continent, passing south of Cape Horn, Cape of Good Hope and Cape Leeuwin. Since 1918, the Panama Canal is an alternative option but the locks must be entered and exited using engine power. Large stretches of the canal can be crossed under sail power.

Sailing around the world can be done in two directions: eastward or westward. The dominant winds and currents (outside of the tropics) make the voyage eastwards on the Southern hemisphere faster, and most skippers and yachts who race prefer this route. Today, the multihulls perform much better than monohulls and hold the best times. Leisure yacht skippers who prefer tropical seas more often go westward, using the trade winds (and the Panama Canal). The Jules Verne Trophy is awarded for the fastest qualifying circumnavigation, starting from an imaginary line between the Créac'h lighthouse on Ushant island, France, and the Lizard Lighthouse in the UK.

The records are homologated by the World Sailing Speed Record Council (WSSRC). WSSRC rules state that qualifying round-the-world voyages must be at least 21,600 nmi long, calculated along the shortest possible track from the starting port and back that does not cross land and does not go below 63°S. The great-circle distance formulas are to be used, assuming that the great circle length is 21,600 nmi. It is allowed to have one single waypoint to lengthen the calculated track. The equator must be crossed. In reality, this means that the boat should pass a waypoint at or not far from the antipode of the starting port of the journey (the exact position depends on how short the shortest possible track is). For example, the Vendée Globe starts at 46°N 2°W, has a waypoint at 57°S 180°E, and barely makes the distance requirement. The participants don't have to go to the antipode at 46°S 178°E since the rounding of Africa gives extra distance.

== Notable races ==
The most famous races around the world are:

- The Vendée Globe, a non-stop solo race, currently run using the IMOCA 60 Class.
- The Ocean Race, a stopping fully crewed race, currently using the Volvo Ocean 65 and IMOCA 60 class. Previously known as the Whitbread Round The World Race and the Volvo Ocean Race.
- The Clipper Round the World Yacht Race, a stopping crewed race for amateur crews using the Clipper 70 Class.
- The Golden Globe Race has returned since 2018 as a retro sailing race without the use of modern technology for navigation.

Former races including:

- The Sunday Times Golden Globe Race, held in 1968–1969, the first round-the-world yacht race.
- The BT Global Challenge, was a race held every four years from 1992 to 2004 and followed the westward route.
- The Race, was a race held in 2000, involving multihulls.
- The Oryx Quest, held in 2005, starting from Qatar.
- The Velux 5 Oceans Race, a stopping solo race, ran using the IMOCA 60 Class. Previously known as the BOC Challenge, later as Around Alone.
- The Barcelona World Race, a non-stop two-handed race held from 2007 to 2015, ran using the IMOCA 60 Class.

== Notable solo achievements ==
From the first round-the-world yacht race (Sunday Times Golden Globe Race) in 1968, to November 2020, around 200 sailors tried their luck in a monohull and less than 100 managed to complete the course, mainly in the context of the Vendée Globe.

Only 6 sailors completed the Westward route facing the dominant winds and currents.

Only 4 sailors managed to complete a round-the-world tour in a single-handed multihull without stopover and without assistance:

- Francis Joyon (2004) 72 days, (2008) 57 days
- Ellen MacArthur (2005) 71 days
- Thomas Coville (2016) 49 days, (2011) 61 days, (2008) 59 days
- Francois Gabart (2017) 42 days

Only 3 sailors have raced non-stop solo around the world in both directions. Mike Golding and Dee Caffari both set WSSRC Westbound world records using Global Challenge boats and also finishing the Eastbound Vendee Globe Race. In 2018 Jean-Luc Van Den Heede also managed this achievement.

== Eastward route ==
=== Crewed ===
Year	Time	Boat name	Type	Crew no.	Crew	Context
2026 January	40d 10h 45m 50s	Sodebo Ultim 3	Trimaran	7	Skipper - Thomas Coville (FRA)| Guillaume Pirouelle (FRA); Pierre Leboucher (FRA); Frédéric Denis (FRA); Benjamin Schwartz (FRA); Léonard Legrand (FRA); Nicolas Troussel (FRA)	attempt for the Jules Verne Trophy
2017 January	40d 23h 30m 30s	IDEC 3	Trimaran	6	Skipper - Francis Joyon (FRA)| Sébastien Audigane (FRA); Gwénolé Gahinet (FRA); Alex Pella (SPA); Bernard Stamm (CH); Clément Surtel (FRA); Onshore Router - Marcel van Triest (NED)	attempt for the Jules Verne Trophy
2012 January	45d 13h 42m 53s	Banque Populaire V	Trimaran	14	Skipper - Loick Peyron (FRA)| Thierry Chabagny (FRA); Florent Chastel (FRA); Thierry Duprey du Vorsent (FRA); Kevin Escoffier (FRA); Emmanuel Le Borgne (FRA); Frédéric Le Peutrec (FRA); Jean-Baptiste Le Vaillant (FRA); Ronan Lucas (FRA); Pierre-Yves Moreau (FRA); Yvan Ravussin (SUI); Xavier Revil (FRA); Brian Thompson (GBR); Juan Vila (ESP); Onshore Router - Marcel van Triest (NED)	attempt for the Jules Verne Trophy
2010 March	48d 07h 44m 52s	Groupama 3	Trimaran	10	Skipper - Franck Cammas (FRA); Navigator - Stan Honey (USA); Fred Le Peutrec (FRA); Stève Ravussin (FRA); Lionel Lemonchois (FRA); Thomas Coville (FRA); Loïc Le Mignon (FRA); Ronan Le Goff (FRA); Bruno Jeanjean (FRA); Jacques Caraës (FRA)	attempt for the Jules Verne Trophy
2005 March	50d 16h 20m 04s	Orange II	Catamaran	14	Skipper - Bruno Peyron (FRA); Navigator - Roger Nilson (SWE); Lionel Lemonchois (FRA); Philippe Péché (FRA); Yann Elies (FRA); Ronan Le Goff; Sébastien Audigane (FRA); Jacques Caraes; Florent Chaste; Yves Le Blévec (FRA); Jean-Baptiste Epron (FRA); Nicolas de Castro; Ludovic Aglao; Bernard Stamm (CH)	attempt for the Jules Verne Trophy
2004 April	58d 09h 32m 45s	Cheyenne	Catamaran	13	Skipper - Steve Fossett (USA); Navigator - Adrienne Cahalan (AUS); David Scully (USA); Brian Thompson (GBR); Jacques Vincent (FRA); Guillermo Altadill (ESP); Mike Beasley (NZL); Fraser Brown (NZL); Mark Featherstone (GBR); Damian Foxall (IRL); Nick Leggatt (RSA); Justin Slattery (IRL); Paul Van Dyke (USA)	
2002 May	64d 08h 37m 24s	Orange	Catamaran	13	Skipper - Bruno Peyron (FRA); Gilles Chiori (FRA); Hervé Jan (FRA); Nick Moloney (AUS); Yann Eliès (FRA); Benoît Briand (FRA); Sébastien Josse (FRA); Ronan le Goff (FRA); Jean Baptiste Epron (FRA); Florent Chastel (FRA); Vladimir Dzada-Lyndis (FRA); Yves le Blévec (FRA); Philippe Péché (FRA)	attempt for the Jules Verne Trophy
1997 March	71d 14h 18m 08s	Sport-Elec	Trimaran	7	Skipper - Olivier de Kersauson (FRA); Didier Gainette (FRA); Hervé Jan (FRA); Michel Bothuon (FRA); Yves Pouillaude (FRA); Thomas Coville (FRA); Marc le Fur (FRA)	attempt for the Jules Verne Trophy
1994 January	74d 22h 17m 22s	Enza	Catamaran	6	Co Skipper - Peter Blake (NZL); Co Skipper - Knox-Johnston (GBR); Paul Standbridge (GBR); David Alan-Williams; Donald Whright; Ed Dandy (GBR)	attempt for the Jules Verne Trophy
1993 January	79d 06h 15m 56s	Commodore Explorer	Catamaran	5	Skipper - Bruno Peyron (FRA); Olivier Despaignes (FRA); Marc Vallin (FRA); Jack Vincent (FRA); Cam Lewis (USA)	attempt for the Jules Verne Trophy

=== Single-handed ===
==== Multihulls ====
Year	Time	Skipper	Yacht	Type	Note
2017	42d 16h 40m 35s	François Gabart (FRA)	Macif	Trimaran 100 ft	Arrived on 17 December 2017, non-stop. Also the second fastest outright circumnavigation time.
2016	49d 3h 7m 38s	Thomas Coville (FRA)	Sodebo Ultim (formerly Geronimo)	Trimaran 102 ft	Arrived on 25 December 2016, non-stop. Also the sixth fastest outright circumnavigation time.
2008	57d 13h 34m 06s	Francis Joyon (FRA)	IDEC 2	Trimaran 97 ft	Arrived on 19 January 2008, non-stop.
2005	71d 14h 18m 33s	Ellen MacArthur (UK)	B&Q/Castorama	Trimaran 75 ft	Arrived on 8 February, non-stop.
2004	72d 22h 54m 22s	Francis Joyon (FRA)	IDEC (formerly Poulain)	Trimaran	Non-stop
1989	125d	Olivier de Kersauson (FRA)	Un autre regard (formerly Poulain)	Trimaran	Two stops
1988	129d 19h 17m	Philippe Monnet (FRA)	Kriter brut de brut	Trimaran	Two stops
1973	169d	Alain Colas (FRA)	Manureva (formerly Pen Duick IV)	Trimaran	One stop

==== Monohulls ====
Year	Time	Skipper	Yacht	Type	Context
2025 (January)	64d 19h 22m 49s	Charlie Dalin (FRA)	MACIF Santé Prévoyance	IMOCA 60	During 2024-2025 Vendee Globe, non-stop and no assistance
2017 (January)	74d 3h 35m	Armel Le Cléac'h (FRA)	Banque Populaire VIII	IMOCA 60	During 2016-2017 Vendée Globe, non-stop and no assistance
2017 (January)	74d 19h 35m	Alex Thomson (GBR)	HUGO BOSS	IMOCA 60	During 2016-2017 Vendée Globe, non-stop and no assistance
2013 (January)	78d 2h 16m	François Gabart (FRA)	MACIF	IMOCA 60	During 2012-2013 Vendée Globe, non-stop and no assistance
2009 (January)	84d 3h 09m	Michel Desjoyeaux (FRA)	Foncia	IMOCA 60	During 2008-2009 Vendée Globe, non-stop and no assistance
2005 (Feb)	87d 10h 45m 55s	Vincent Riou (FRA)	PRB (2)	IMOCA 60	During 2004-2005 Vendée Globe, non-stop and no assistance
2001 (Feb)	93d 3h 57m 32s	Michel Desjoyeaux (FRA)	PRB (2)	IMOCA 60	During 2000-2001 Vendée Globe, non-stop and no assistance
1997	105d 20h 31m 23s	Christophe Auguin (FRA)	Geodis	IMOCA 60	During 1996-1997 Vendée Globe, non-stop and no assistance
1990	109d 08h 48' 50"	Titouan Lamazou (FRA)	Ecureuil d'Aquitaine II	Monohull	During 1989-1990 Vendée Globe, non-stop and no assistance
1986	150d 1h 6m	Dodge Morgan (USA)	American Promise	Monohull	12 November 1985 – 11 April 1986, non-stop
1985	236d 10h 45m	Peter Freeman (CAN)	Laiviņa	Monohull	3 November 1984 – 27 June 1985 non-stop. Santa Barbara to Santa Barbara, CA, USA. Guinness record. Total voyage: Victoria to Victoria, BC, Canada. 14 October 1984 – 14 July 1985.
1982	419d 22h 10m	Jon Sanders (AUS)	Perie Banou	Monohull	The first single-handed sailor to remain continuously at sea twice around the world west to east via Southern Ocean
1969	313d	Sir Robin Knox-Johnston (GBR)	Suhaili	Monohull	Attempt at Sunday Times Golden Globe Race. Achieved first non-stop single handed circumnavigation.
1967	226d	Sir Francis Chichester (GBR)	Gipsy Moth IV	Monohull	Solo attempt. One Stop in Sydney. Second person to achieve a true circumnavigation of the world solo, after Joshua Slocum.

=== Non-stop Longest Distance Sailed ===
This record is recognised by the Guinness Book of Records

Year	Time	Skipper	Yacht	Type	Context	Ref.
1988	657d 21h 18m	Jon Sanders (AUS)	Parry Endeavour	Monohull	Triple non-stop solo circumnavigation, longest distance sailed non-stop by any vessel (71,023 nautical miles)	

=== Singlehanded Female ===
==== Multihull ====
Date	Time	Skipper	Yacht	Type	Note	Ref.
2005-02-08	71d 14h 18m 33s	Ellen MacArthur (GBR)	B&Q/Castorama	75 ft Trimaran		
2000	94d 04h 25m	Ellen MacArthur (GBR)	Kingfisher	60 ft Monohull; IMOCA 60	set doing the 2000–2001 Vendée Globe Race	
1996	140d 04h 38m	Catherine Chabaud (FRA)	Whirlpool-Europe 2	60 ft Monohull; IMOCA 60	set doing the 1996–1997 Vendée Globe Race	
1995	285d 26m 27s	Lisa Clayton (GBR)	Spirit/Birmingham	38 ft Monohull		

The following voyages were pioneers and not officially recognized by the WSSRC.

- Ten women have completed the Vendee Globe, with two of them having broken the outright record and more recently the establishment of a monohull record.
- In 1978 Naomi James (NZL) sailed solo round the world in 272d on Express Crusader (formerly Spirit of Cutty Sark) a 53 ft Monohull Van der Stadt design Gallant 53.
- In 1978 Krystyna Chojnowska-Liskiewicz (POL) became the first women to sail around the world in 401-day voyage 1978

==== Monohull ====
Date	Time	Skipper	Yacht	Type	Note	Ref.
2025-01-25	76d 01h 36m 52s	Justine Mettraux (SUI)	Teamwork.net	IMOCA 60	set doing the 2024–2025 Vendée Globe Race	

== Westward route ==
This route is the more demanding one, as it faces the dominant winds and currents. As such, there are fewer attempts and records.

=== Outright Crewed ===
As of February 2010, no record has been homologated.

=== Outright Single-handed ===
Year	Time	Skipper	Yacht	Type	Note
2004	122d 14h 03m 49s	Jean-Luc Van Den Heede (FRA)	Adrien	Monohull	Solo attempt non-stop. Arrived 19 March.
2000	151d 19h 54m	Philippe Monnet (FRA)	Uunet	Monohull	Solo attempt non-stop. Arrived 9 June.
1994	167d 7h 42m 54s	Mike Golding (GBR)	Group 4	Monohull	Fastest westward journey
1987	257d 21h 18m	Jon Sanders (AUS)	Parry Endeavour	Monohull	Triple non-stop solo circumnavigation, 1st and 3rd circumnavigations were westwards
1971	292d	Chay Blyth (GBR)	British Steel	Monohull	Started 18 October 1970, arrived 6 August 1971
1898	1160d	Joshua Slocum (USA)	Spray	Monohull	First solo circumnavigation; started 24 April 1895, arrived 27 June 1898

=== Female Non-stop Single-handed ===
Year	Time	Skipper	Yacht	Type	Note	Ref.
2006	178d 17h 55m 42s	Dee Caffari (GBR)	Aviva	Challenge 72	Later also completed an Eastabout solo circumnavigation	

== Passage records ==
=== Multihull ===
Skipper	Year	Equator	Good Hope	Cape Agulhas	Cape Leeuwin	Tasmania	Anti meridian	Cape Horn	Equator	Ushant
Franck Cammas	2021	5 d 13 h 14 '	11 d 09 h 53 '	11 d 14 h 03 '						
Thomas Coville	2020	5 d 09 h 50 '	12 d 02 h 05 '	12 d 03 h 45 '						
Yann Guichard	2019	4 d 19 h 57 '	12 d 13 h 08 '	12 d 14 h 58 '						
Francis Joyon	2016	5 d 18 h 59 '	12 d 19 h 28 '	12 d 21 h 22 '	17 d 06 h 59 '	18 d 18 h 31 '	20 d 07 h 04 '	26 d 15 h 45 '	35 d 04 h 09 '	40 d 23 h 30 '
Loïck Peyron	2011	5 d 14 h 55 '	11 d 21 h 48 '	11 d 23 h 49 '	17 d 23 h 57 '	20 d 07 h 11 '	22 d 11 h 34 '	30 d 22 h 19 '	38 d 02 h 46 '	45 d 13 h 42 '
Yann Guichard	2015	4 d 21 h 29 '	11 d 22 h 04 '	12 d 00 h 02 '	18 d 11 h 25 '	20 d 04 h 37 '	22 d 07 h 43 '	30 d 04 h 07 '	39 d 13 h 31 '	47 d 10 h 59 '
Francis Joyon	2015	5 d 05 h 01 '	13 d 05 h 11 '	13 d 09 h 15 '	18 d 20 h 37 '	20 d 08 h 18 '	22 d 09 h 48 '	31 d 01 h 47 '	40 d 14 h 53 '	47 d 14 h 47 '
Franck Cammas	2009	5 d 15 h 23 '	14 d 13 h 31 '	14 d 15 h 48 '	21 d 14 h 22 '	22 d 20 h 27 '	25 d 07 h 36 '	32 d 04 h 34 '	41 d 21 h 09 '	48 d 07 h 44 '
Bruno Peyron	2005	7 d 02 h 56 '	14 d 05 h 21 '	14 d 08 h 19 '	21 d 13 h	23 d 19 h 23 '	25 d 21 h 33 '	32 d 13 h 29 '	40 d 19 h 05 '	50 d 16 h 20 '
Steve Fossett	2004	8 d 06 h 28 '	17 d 23 h 29 '		25 d 14 h 08 '		30 d 22 h 47 '	39 d 16 h 16 '	50 d 03 h 03 '	58 d 09 h 32 '
O. de Kersauson	2003	6 d 11 h 26 '	16 d 14 h 35 '		26 d 04 h 53 '		31 d 22 h 53 '	41 d 16 h 27 '	53 d 09 h 37 '	68 d 01 h 58 '
Bruno Peyron	2002	7 d 22 h	18 d 18 h 40 '		29 d 07 h 22 '		34 d 09 h 20 '	42 d 02 h 52 '	53 d 04 h 49 '	64 d 08 h 37 '

Skipper	Year	Ushant Equator	Equator Good Hope	Good Hope Leeuwin	Leeuwin Cape Horn	Cape Horn Equator	Equator Ushant
Franck Cammas	2021	5 d 13 h 14 '	5 d 20 h 39 '				
Thomas Coville	2020	5 d 09 h 50 '	6 d 16 h 15 '				
Yann Guichard	2015	4 d 19 h 57 '	7 d 17 h 11 '				
Francis Joyon	2016	5 d 18 h 59 '	7 d 00 h 29 '	4 d 11 h 31 '	9 d 08 h 46 '	8 d 12 h 24 '	5 d 19 h 21 '
Loïck Peyron	2011	5 d 14 h 55 '	6 d 06 h 53 '	6 d 02 h 09 '	12 d 22 h 22 '	7 d 04 h 27 '	7 d 10 h 58 '
Yann Guichard	2015	4 d 21 h 29 '	7 d 00 h 35 '	6 d 13 h 21 '	12 d 06 h 03 '	9 d 09 h 24 '	7 d 21 h 28 '
Francis Joyon	2015	5 d 05 h 01 '	8 d 04 h 10 '	5 d 15 h 26 '	12 d 05 h 10 '	9 d 13 h 06 '	6 d 23 h 56 '
Franck Cammas	2009	5 d 15 h 23 '	7 d 02 h 23 '	7 d 00 h 51 '	10 d 14 h 12 '	9 d 16 h 35 '	6 d 10 h 44 '
Bruno Peyron	2005	7 d 02 h 56 '	7 d 05 h 23 '	7 d 07 h 39 '	12 d 00 h 29 '	8 d 05 h 36 '	9 d 21 h 15 '
Steve Fossett	2004	8 d 06 h 28 '	9 d 17 h 01 '	7 d 14 h 39 '	14 d 02 h 08 '	10 d 10 h 47 '	8 d 06 h 29 '
O. de Kersauson	2003	6 d 11 h 26 '	10 d 03 h 09 '	9 d 09 h 18 '	15 d 11 h 34 '	11 d 17 h 10 '	14 d 15 h 21 '
Bruno Peyron	2002	7 d 22 h 00 '	10 d 20 h 40 '	12 d 19 h 30 '	10 d 12 h 42 '	11 d 01 h 57 '	11 d 03 h 48 '

Skipper	Year	Good Hope Cape Horn	Equator Equator	Equator Cape Horn	Cape Horn Ushant	Indian Ocean WSSRC	Pacific Ocean WSSRC
Francis Joyon	2016	13 d 20 h 13 '	29 d 09 h 10 '	20 d 20 h 46 '	14 d 07 h 45 '	5 d 21 h 09 '	7 d 21 h 14 '
Loïck Peyron	2011	19 d 00 h 31 '	32 d 11 h 51 '	25 d 07 h 23 '	14 d 15 h 25 '	8 d 07 h 23 '	10 d 15 h 07 '
Yann Guichard	2015	18 d 06 h 03 '	34 d 08 h 02 '	25 d 06 h 38 '	17 d 06 h 54 '	8 d 04 h 45 '	9 d 23 h 30 '
Francis Joyon	2015	17 d 20 h 36 '	35 d 13 h 52 '	26 d 00 h 46 '	16 d 13 h 02 '	7 d 00 h 00 '	10 d 23 h 10 '
Franck Cammas	2009	17 d 15 h 03 '	36 d 02 h 03 '	26 d 09 h 27 '	16 d 03 h 19 '	8 d 17 h 39 '	8 d 18 h 41 '
Bruno Peyron	2005	18 d 08 h 08 '	33 d 16 h 06 '	25 d 03 h 35 '	18 d 02 h 39 '	9 d 11 h 04 '	8 d 18 h 08 '
Steve Fossett	2004	21 d 16 h 47 '	41 d 20 h 35 '	31 d 09 h 48 '	18 d 17 h 16 '		
O. de Kersauson	2003	25 d 01 h 52 '	46 d 22 h 11 '	35 d 05 h 01 '	16 d 07 h 31 '		
Bruno Peyron	2002	23 d 08 h 12 '	45 d 06 h 49 '	34 d 04 h 52 '	22 d 05 h 45 '		

=== Multihull (singlehanded) ===
Skipper	Year	Equator	Good Hope	Cape Agulhas	Cape Leeuwin	Tasmania	Anti meridian	Cape Horn	Equator	Ushant
Charles Caudrelier	2024	06 d 07 h 41 '	12 d 01 h 02 '		18 d 05 h 43 '					
François Gabart	2017	5 d 20 h 45 '	11 d 20 h 10 '	11 d 22 h 20 '	19 d 14 h 10 '	21 d 12 h 00 '	23 d 05 h 08 '	29 d 03 h 15 '	36 d 01 h 30 '	42 d 16 h 40 '
Thomas Coville	2016	5 d 17 h 15 '	14 d 04 h 44 '		21 d 03 h 09 '	22 d 17 h 01 '	24 d 15 h 05 '	31 d 11 h 30 '	41 d 14 h 53 '	49 d 03 h 07 '
Francis Joyon	2007	6 d 16 h 58 '	15 d 07 h 16 '		22 d 15 h 28 '	24 d 19 h 19 '	27 d 07 h	35 d 12 h 36 '	48 d 02 h 18 '	57 d 13 h 34 '
Ellen MacArthur	2004	8 d 18 h 20 '	18 d 18 h 20 '		29 d 14 h 25 '	32 d 19 h 57 '		44 d 23 h 36 '	60 d 13 h	71 d 14 h 18 '

Skipper	Year	Ushant Equator	Equator Good Hope	Good Hope Leeuwin	Leeuwin Cape Horn	Cape Horn Equator	Equator Ushant
Charles Caudrelier	2024	6 d 7 h 41 min	5 d 17 h 21 '	6 d 04 h 41 '			
François Gabart	2017	5 d 20 h 45 '	5 d 23 h 25 '	7 d 18 h	9 d 13 h 05 '	6 d 22 h 15 '	6 d 15 h 10 '
Thomas Coville	2016	5 d 17 h 15 '	8 d 11 h 29 '	6 d 22 h 25 '	10 d 08 h 21 '	10 d 03 h 23 '	7 d 12 h 14 '
Francis Joyon	2007	6 d 16 h 58 '	8 d 14 h 18 '	7 d 8 h 11 '	12 d 21 h 08 '	12 d 13 h 42 '	9 d 11 h 16 '
Ellen MacArthur	2004	8 d 18 h 20 '	10 d 00 h 00 '	10 d 19 h 05 '	18 d 04 h 20 '	15 d 13 h 24 '	11 d 01 h 18 '

Skipper	Year	Good Hope Cape Horn	Equator Equator	Equator Cape Horn	Cape Horn Ushant	Indian Ocean WSSRC	Pacific Ocean WSSRC
François Gabart	2017	17 d 07 h 05 '	30 d 04 h 45 '	23 d 06 h 30 '	13 d 13 h 25 '	9 d 13 h 40 '	7 d 15 h 15 '
Thomas Coville	2016	17 d 06 h 46 '	35 d 21 h 38 '	25 d 18 h 15 '	17 d 15 h 37 '	8 d 12 h 19 '	8 d 18 h 28 '
Francis Joyon	2007	20 d 05 h 20 '	41 d 09 h 14 '	28 d 19 h 38 '	22 d 00 h 58 '	9 d 12 h 03 '	10 d 14 h 30 '
Ellen MacArthur	2004	26 d 05 h 16 '	52 d 18 h 40 '	36 d 05 h 16 '	26 d 14 h 42 '	14 d 01 h 37 '	12 d 13 h 39 '

=== Monohull (singlehanded) ===
Vendée Globe Singlehanded IMOCA

Skipper	Year	Equator	Good Hope	Cape Agulhas	Cape Leeuwin	Tasmania	Anti meridian	Cape Horn	Equator	Ushant
Armel Le Cléac'h	2017	9 d 09 h 56 '	18 d 03 h 30 '		28 d 20 h 12 '	32 d 00 h 13 '		47 d 00 h 32 '	61 d 12 h 21 '	74 d 03 h 36 '
François Gabart	2013	11 d 00 h 20 '	23 d 03 h 43 '		34 d 10 h 23 '	37 d 18 h 56 '		52 d 06 h 18 '	66 d 01 h 39 '	78 d 02 h 16 '
Michel Desjoyeaux	2009	13 d 15 h 41 '	27 d 00 h 34 '		37 d 07 h 23 '		43 d 23 h 33 '	56 d 15 h 08 '	71 d 17 h 12 '	84 d 03 h 09 '
Vincent Riou	2005	10 d 12 h 13 '	24 d 02 h 18 '		36 d 11 h 48 '			56 d 17 h 13 '	72 d 13 h 58 '	87 d 10 h 47 '

Skipper	Year	Ushant Equator	Equator Good Hope	Good Hope Leeuwin	Leeuwin Cape Horn	Cape Horn Equator	Equator Ushant
Armel Le Cléac'h	2017	9 d 09 h 56 '	8 d 17 h 34 '	10 d 16 h 42 '	18 d 04 h 20 '	14 d 11 h 49 '	12 d 15 h 15 '
François Gabart	2013	11 d 00 h 20 '	12 d 03 h 23 '	11 d 06 h 40 '	17 d 17 h 55 '	13 d 19 h 21 '	12 d 00 h 37 '
Michel Desjoyeaux	2009	13 d 15 h 41 '	13 d 08 h 53 '	10 d 06 h 49 '	19 d 07 h 45 '	15 d 02 h 04 '	12 d 09 h 57 '
Vincent Riou	2005	10 d 12 h 13 '	13 d 14 h 05 '	12 d 07 h 30 '	20 d 05 h 25 '	15 d 20 h 11 '	14 d 20 h 49 '

Skipper	Year	Good Hope Cape Horn	Equator Equator	Equator Cape Horn	Cape Horn Ushant	Indian Ocean WSSRC	Pacific Ocean WSSRC
Armel Le Cléac'h	2017	28 d 21 h 02 '	52 d 02 h 25 '	37 d 14 h 36 '	27 d 03 h 04 '	13 d 17 h 29 '	15 d 00 h 19 '
François Gabart	2013	29 d 02 h 35 '	55 d 01 h 19 '	41 d 05 h 19 '	25 d 20 h 37 '	14 d 10 h 20 '	14 d 11 h 56 '
Michel Desjoyeaux	2009	29 d 15 h 42 '	58 d 01 h 31 '	42 d 23 h 43 '	17 d 12 h 01 '		
Vincent Riou	2005	32 d 14 h 55 '	62 d 01 h 45 '	46 d 05 h 00 '	17 d 12 h 01 '	19 d 17 h 34 '	

== Intermediate records ==
The rules for intermediate records are set by the WSSRC. There are 4 categories:

- Equator to Equator
- Indian Ocean
- Pacific Ocean
- South Atlantic Ocean

=== From Equator to Equator ===
From the Atlantic Ocean: Equator => Cape Agulhas (South Africa) => Around Antarctica => Cape Horn => Equator

Date	Time	Skipper	Yacht	Type	Crew
2017	29 j 09 h 10 min	Francis Joyon	IDEC sport	multihull	Crewed
2011	32 j 11 h 51 min	Loïck Peyron	Banque Populaire V	multihull	Crewed
2005	33 j 16 h 06 min	Bruno Peyron	Orange II	multihull	Crewed
2015	34 j 08 h 02 min	Yann Guichard	Maxi Spindrift 2	multihull	Crewed
2016	35 j 13 h 52 min	Francis Joyon	IDEC sport	multihull	Crewed
2010	36 j 02 h 03 min	Franck Cammas	Groupama 3	multihull	Crewed
2017	30 j 04 h 45 min	François Gabart	Macif	multihull	Singlehanded
2016	35 j 21 h 38 min	Thomas Coville	Sodebo Ultim	multihull	Singlehanded
2008	41 j 09 h 14 min	Francis Joyon	IDEC	multihull	Singlehanded
2005	52 j 18 h 40 min	Ellen MacArthur	B&Q/Castorama	multihull	Singlehanded
2017	52 j 02 h 25 min	Armel Le Cléac’h	Banque populaire	Monohull	Singlehanded
2013	55 j 01 h 19 min	François Gabart	Macif	Monohull	Singlehanded

=== Indian Ocean ===
From Cape Agulhas, South Africa (longitude : 20°E) to Tasmania south point, (longitude : 146°49'E)

Date	Time	Skipper	Yacht	Type	Crew
2017	5 j 21 h 09 min	Francis Joyon	IDEC sport	Multihull	Crewed
2015	7 j 00 h 00 min	Francis Joyon	IDEC sport	Multihull	Crewed
2015	8 j 04 h 45 min	Yann Guichard	Maxi Spindrift 2	Multihull	Crewed
2011	8 j 07 h 23 min	Loïck Peyron	Banque Populaire V	Multihull	Crewed
2010	8 j 17 h 39 min	Franck Cammas	Groupama 3	Multihull	Crewed
2005	9 j 11 h 04 min	Bruno Peyron	Orange II	Multihull	Crewed
2016	8 j 12 h 19 min	Thomas Coville	Sodebo Ultim	Multihull	Single-handed
2007	9 j 12 h 03 min	Francis Joyon	IDEC	Multihull	Single-handed
2005	14 j 01 h 37 min	Ellen MacArthur	B&Q/Castorama	Multihull	Single-handed
2016	13 j 17 h 29 min	Armel Le Cléac'h	Banque populaire VIII	Monohull	Single-handed
2012	14 j 19 h 20 min	Armel Le Cléac’h	Banque populaire	Monohull	Single-handed

=== Pacific Ocean ===
Southernmost point in Tasmania, (longitude : 146°49'E) to Cape Horn (longitude : 67°16'W)

Date	Time	Skipper	Yacht	Type	Crew
2017	7 j 21 h 14 min	Francis Joyon	IDEC sport	Multihull	Crewed
2005	8 j 18 h 08 min	Bruno Peyron	Orange II	Multihull	Crewed
2010	8 j 18 h 41 min	Franck Cammas	Groupama 3	Multihull	Crewed
2015	9 j 23 h 30 min	Yann Guichard	Maxi Spindrift 2	Multihull	Crewed
2011	10 j 15 h 07 min	Loïck Peyron	Banque Populaire V	Multihull	Crewed
2015	10 j 23 h 10 min	Francis Joyon	IDEC sport	Multihull	Crewed
2017	7 j 15 h 15 min	François Gabart	Macif	Multihull	Single-handed
2016	8 j 18 h 28 min	Thomas Coville	Sodebo Ultim	Multihull	Single-handed
2007	10 j 14 h 30 min	Francis Joyon	IDEC	Multihull	Single-handed
2004	12 j 13 h 39 min	Ellen MacArthur	B&Q/Castorama	Multihull	Single-handed
2016	15 j 00 h 19 min	Armel Le Cléac'h	Banque populaire VIII	Monohull	Single-handed
2013	14 j 11 h 56 min	François Gabart	Macif	Monohull	Single-handed

=== South Atlantic Ocean ===
From Cape Horn (longitude : 67°16'W) to Cape Agulhas, South Africa (longitude : 20°E)

Date	Time	Skipper	Yacht	Type	Crew
17 March 2005	11d 10h 22m 13s	Tony Bullimore (UK)	Doha	Multihull	Crewed

=== From Jules Verne Trophy starting line (Ushant) to Equator (out of WSSRC rule) ===
Date	Time	Skipper	Yacht	Type	Crew
27 November 2011	5d 14h 55m	Loïck Peyron (FRA)	Banque Populaire V	Multihull	Crewed
11 November 2009	5d 15h 23m	Franck Cammas (FRA)	Groupama 3	Multihull	Crewed
6 February 2010	5d 19h 07m	Franck Cammas (FRA)	Groupama 3	Multihull	Crewed
30 January 2008	6d 6h 24m	Franck Cammas (FRA)	Groupama 3	Multihull	Crewed
2003	6d 11h 26m	Olivier de Kersauson (FRA)	Geronimo	Multihull	Crewed
30 November 2007	6d 16h 58m	Francis Joyon (FRA)	IDEC 2	Multihull	Single-handed
31 January 2005	7d 02h 56m	Bruno Peyron (FRA)	Orange II	Multihull	Crewed

=== From Equator to Cape of Good Hope (out of WSSRC rules) ===
Date	Time	Skipper	Yacht	Type	Crew
4 December 2011	6d 06h 53m	Loïck Peyron (FRA)	Banque Populaire V	Multihull	Crewed. Also beats the record Ushant - Cape of Good Hope in 11d 21h and 48m
6 February 2008	7d 02h 23m	Franck Cammas (FRA)	Groupama 3	Multihull	Crewed
7 February 2005	7d 05h 23m	Bruno Peyron (FRA)	Orange II	Multihull	Crewed
15 February 2010	8d 20h 40m	Franck Cammas (FRA)		Multihull	Crewed

=== From Cape Horn to Equator (out of WSSRC rules) ===
From the cape Horn, cutting the longitude 67°16'W, up to the Equator

Date	Time	Skipper	Yacht	Type	Crew
30 December 2011	07d 5h and 0m	Loïck Peyron (FRA)	Banque Populaire V	Multihull	Crewed
26 February 2005	08d 5h and 36m	Bruno Peyron (FRA)	Orange II	Multihull	Crewed
2004	10d 10h and 47m	Steve Fossett (USA)	Cheyenne	Multihull	Crewed
2002	11d 1h and 57m	Bruno Peyron (FRA)	Orange	Multihull	Crewed
2004	12d 10h and 25m	Olivier de Kersauson (FRA)	Geronimo	Multihull	Crewed

=== From Equator to Jules Verne Trophy finishing line (Ushant) (out of WSSRC rules) ===
Date	Time	Skipper	Yacht	Type	Crew
2010	06d 10h and 44m	Franck Cammas (FRA)	Groupama 3	Multihull	Crewed
2004	08d 6h and 42m	Steve Fossett (USA)	Cheyenne	Multihull	Crewed
2004	09d 11h and 7m	Olivier de Kersauson (FRA)	Geronimo	Multihull	Crewed
2005	09d 11h and 15m	Bruno Peyron (FRA)	Orange II	Multihull	Crewed
2002	11d 3h and 48m	Bruno Peyron (FRA)	Orange	Multihull	Crewed

== See also ==
- Circumnavigation
- List of circumnavigations
- List of youth solo sailing circumnavigations

Competitions and prizes

- Global Challenge
- Jules Verne Trophy
- The race
- Oryx Quest
- Vendée Globe

Other speed sailing records

- Speed sailing record
- World Sailing Speed Record Council
- Transatlantic sailing record
