= Innovation Explorer =

Maxi ocean racing catamaran

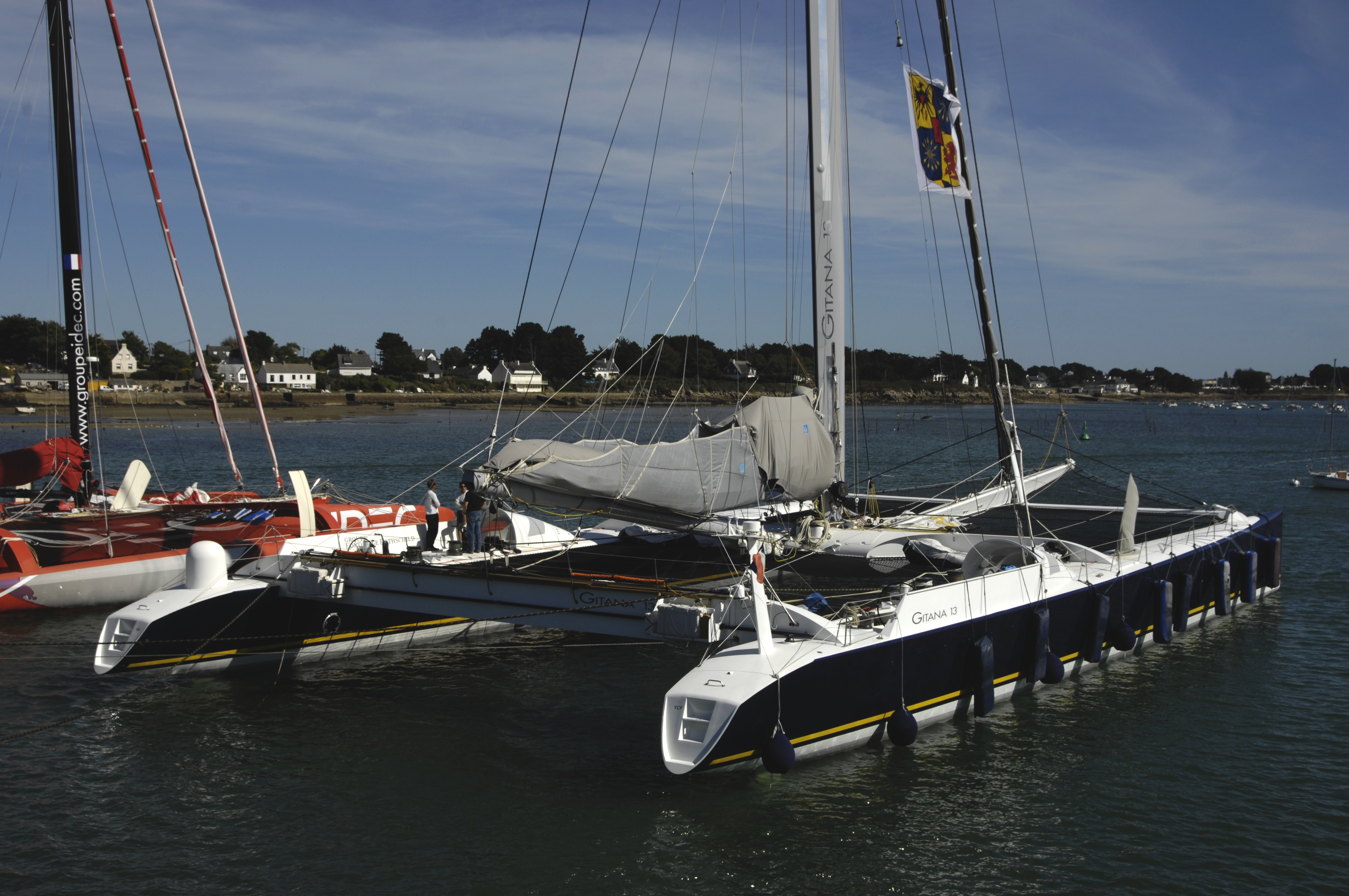
- Gitana 13 in 2010.
- Other names: Innovation Explorer; Orange; Kingfisher 2 Swift
- Designer(s): Gilles Ollier
- Builder: Multiplast
- Launched: 2000

Racing career
- Skippers: Loïck Peyron; Bruno Peyron; Ellen MacArthur; Lionel Lemonchois

Specifications
- Displacement: 20 t (20 long tons; 22 short tons)
- Length: 33.50 m (109.9 ft) (LOA)
- Beam: 17.50 m (57.4 ft)
- Mast height: 39 m (128 ft)
- Sail area: 610 m^{2} (6,600 sq ft) (upwind); 800 m^{2} (8,600 sq ft) (downwind)
- Crew: 10–12

The boat was initially launched "Code Zero" as its owners searched for sponsorship. It was soon renamed Innovation Explorer and is an ocean-racing catamaran. It was built for The Race, a no-limits non-stop crewed circumnavigation in which she took second place.

== Design and development ==
The boat has two sister ships developed at the same time for Club Med and Team Adventure.

== Ownerhip ==
She has had several owners and several names, including:

=== 2000-Innovation Explorer ===
The boat was skippered by Loïck Peyron and Skip Novak in The Race coming 2nd in a time of 64d 22h 32m 38s.

=== 2002 - Orange ===
The boat was brought by Bruno Peyron in 2002 where she broke the Around the world sailing record and the Jules Verne Trophy. (Not to be confused with Orange II (boat) which broke the record in 2005)

=== 2003 - Kingfisher 2 ===
Skippered by Ellen MacArthur in 2003. Whilst competing for the Jules Verne Trophy, she broke her mast near the south-east Kerguelen Islands,

=== 2006 - Gitana 13 ===
With skipper Lionel Lemonchois

== Records ==
- As Orange, she won the Jules Verne Trophy (Around the world sailing record) in 64 days, 8 hours, 37 minutes and 24 seconds, in 2002.
- As Gitana 13, she set the transpacific record between San Francisco and Yokohama in 11 days, 12 minutes and 54 seconds, in 2008.
- Record from New York to San Francisco via Cape Horn, 2008 Feb, 43 days, 3 minutes and 18 seconds

Records
Preceded by Sport Elec with Olivier de Kersauson	Jules Verne Trophy; 2002–2004	Succeeded by Geronimo with Olivier de Kersauson
