= Francis Joyon =

French professional sailboat racer and yachtsman

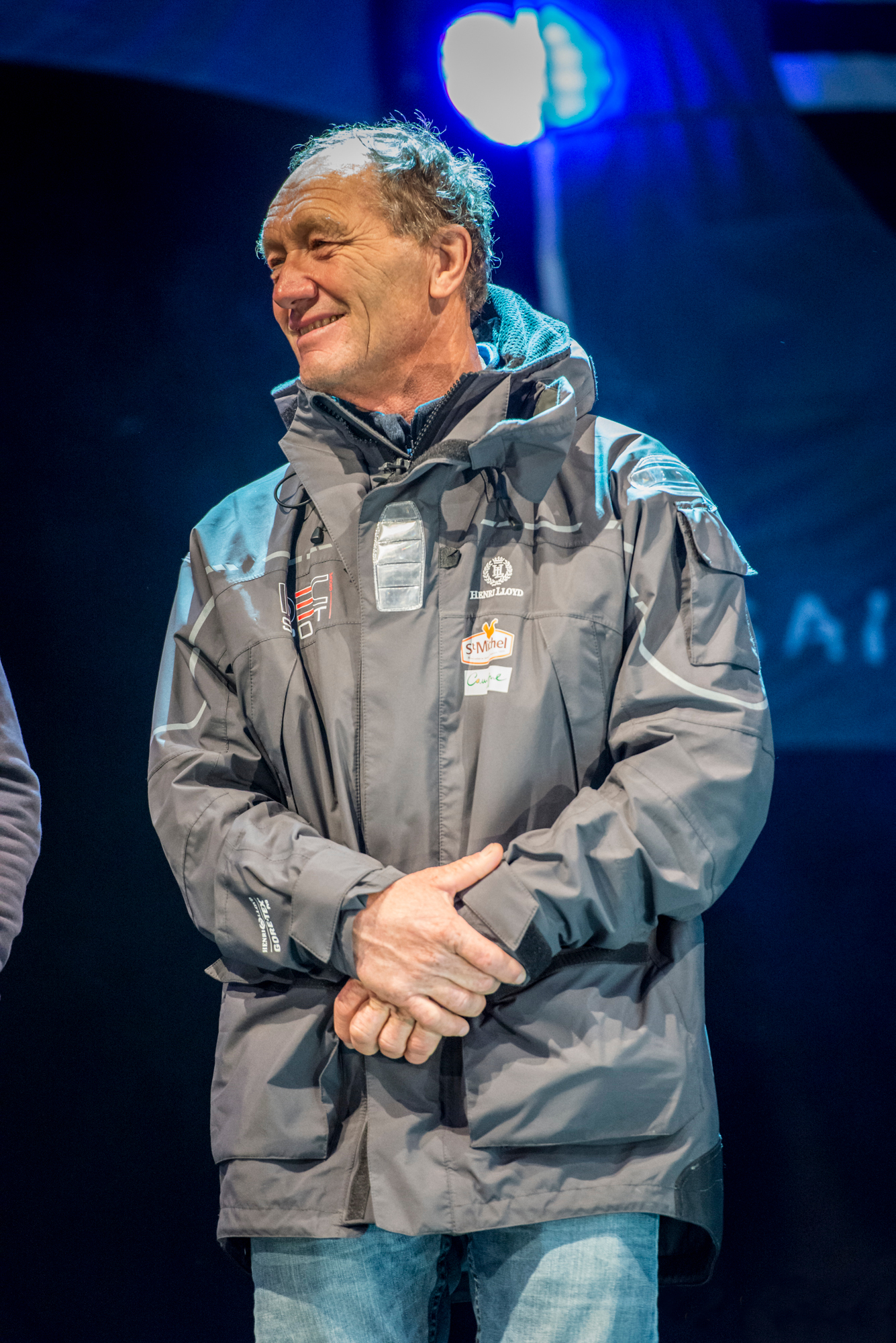
Francis Joyon in 2014

Francis Joyon (born 28 May 1956) is a French professional sailboat racer and yachtsman. Joyon and his crew currently hold the Jules Verne Trophy for circumnavigation, on IDEC SPORT (40 days, 23 hours, 30 minutes and 30 seconds), nearly five days less than the previous reference time. He held the record for the fastest single-handed sailing circumnavigation from 2008 to 2016.

Although previously well known as an offshore sailor, Joyon's real leap to international prominence came in February 2004 when the Breton became the fastest world solo yachtsman, setting a time of 72 days, 22 hours, 54 minutes and 22 seconds, over 20 days faster than the previous record for circumnavigation.

During the record run, he sailed more than 28,000 nautical miles (51,900 km) at an average speed of 15.5 knots (28.7 km/h) on the 27 metres (89 ft) IDEC. IDEC, formerly known as Sport Elec, had previously taken 71 days to win the Jules Verne Trophy. Joyon took only one additional day while sailing on his own with a boat not designed for single-handed sailing, original (over 10 year old) sails and no weather router.

On 6 July 2005 Francis Joyon and IDEC crossed the finishing line between Lizard Point and Ushant 6 days 4 hours 1 minute and 37 seconds after the start at Ambrose Light off New York, breaking the 11-year-old record of Laurent Bourgnon for the single-handed crossing of the Atlantic Ocean with a sailing boat. During the same voyage he also broke the 24-hour distance record for single-handed sailing by sailing 543 nautical miles (1,006 km) in one day on the 3 July 2005. Joyon's record voyage ended badly on 7 July while he was sailing back to his home port after completion of the transatlantic run. Joyon, who refused help to sail the boat home from the finish line and was still single-handed, was sailing across the English Channel. At a critical moment an exhausted Joyon fell asleep and the boat continued on autopilot. IDEC ran aground at the Pointe de Penmarc'h on the Breton coast. The €4 million trimaran was wrecked; Joyon escaped without injury.

On 9 May 2006 Joyon announced that he was building a new muilti-hull to be called IDEC 2. His new boat is designed for solo sailing unlike the original IDEC, which was originally designed for crewed sailing. Design was by Nigel Irens & Bernard Cabaret. IDEC 2 weighs 11 tons, compared to his previous boat which weighed 16 tons, and has 10% more sail area. The new boat was seen as capable of taking 3 days off the existing record under the same weather conditions.

On 23 November 2007 Joyon set off in IDEC 2 in an attempt to beat Ellen MacArthur's world record for a single handed circumnavigation. He achieved this on 20 January 2008 in 57 days, 13 hours 34 minutes and 6 seconds, in a voyage that is regarded as one of the most impressive sailing feats in recent history and in a time nearly two weeks less than the previous record.

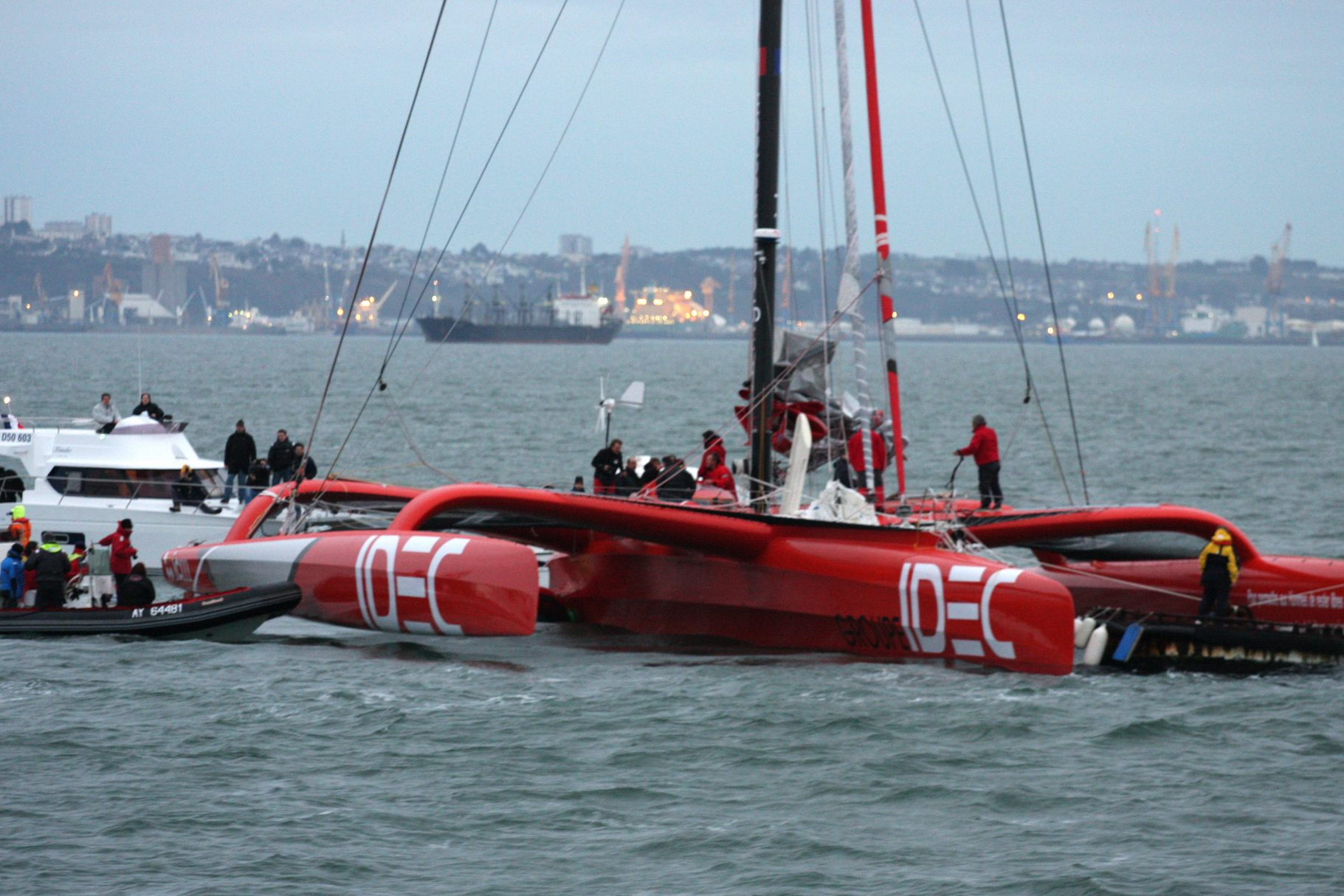
Joyon completing record-setting circumnavigation

During her Jules-Verne trophy record in 2016-2017, the trimaran Idec sport in the hands of Francis Joyon and his crew of Clément Surtel, Alex Pella, Bernard Stamm, Gwénolé Gahinet and Sébastien Audigane, covered 894 nautical miles in 24 hours, and 10 consecutive days at 809 miles / 24 h. Francis Joyon rounds Cape Horn, 16 days after riding off of South America, and after a course of nearly 12,000 miles above an average of 30 knots (730.16 miles / 24 h over 16 days). He then signs a performance increase of between 30 and 40% compared to the record to be broken by Loïck Peyron 5 years earlier. Leaving the southern seas with a lead of 4 j 06 h 35 min over Loïck Peyron's previous record, Francis Joyon, Clément Surtel, Alex Pella, Bernard Stamm, Gwénolé Gahinet and Sébastien Audigane regained the equivalent of 2,800 miles on the record during this episode.

== Achievements ==
- 1988: 32nd Route de la Découverte (JB-Express)
- 1990: 10th Route du Rhum (BPO)
- 1991: 5th Course de l'Europe (Kar-Cadelac)
- 1992: 3rd Transat and 3rd Route du café (BPO)
- 1993: 3rd Course de l'Europe (Banque Populaire)
- 1995: 2nd Transat Jacques-Vabre and 3rd Course de l'Europe (Banque Populaire)
- 1996: 2nd Transat Québec - Saint-Malo (Banque Populaire)
- 1998: 6th Route du Rhum (Banque Populaire)
- 2000: 1st Transat (Eure-et-Loir)
- 2001: 1st Fastnet Race and also beat the record by sailing around the Isle of Wight in 3 hours ten minutes and 11 seconds
- 2003-2004: Beat the record by sailing singlehanded around the world in 72 days, 22 hours, 54 minutes and 22 seconds (IDEC). Subsequently, beaten by Ellen MacArthur in 2005
- 2005: Beat the record by sailing single-handed across the Atlantic in 6 days, 4 hours 1 minute and 37 seconds (IDEC)
- 2007: Beat the 24-hour single-handed distance record by sailing 613.54 miles in 24 hours at an average speed of 25.85 knots. Joyon set the record sailing IDEC 2 during a successful attempt to break the single-handed around the world record. Soon after, Joyon's 24-hour distance record was beaten by Thomas Coville who sailed 619.3 miles in 24 hours during an unsuccessful single-handed around the world record attempt
- 2008: Beat the record for sailing single-handed around the world in 57 days 13 hours 34 minutes and 6 seconds comprehensively beating Ellen MacArthur's existing record by 14 days, 00 hours, 44 minutes and 27 seconds
- 2010: 2nd Route du Rhum, with IDEC 2
- 2013: Beat his own record Road of the discovery between Cadiz and San Salvador Island, with IDEC 2
- Beat (16 June) the record by sailing single-handed across the Atlantic in 5 days, 2 hours 56 minutes and 10 seconds (with IDEC 2)
- 2017: Jules Verne Trophy with IDEC SPORT (40 days 23 hours 30 minutes 30 seconds)
- Beat (12 July) his own record by sailing single handed across the Atlantic in 5 days, 1 hour 37 minutes and 02 seconds (with IDEC 2)
- 2018: 1st Route du Rhum
