= Thomas Coville =

French yacht racer (born 1968)

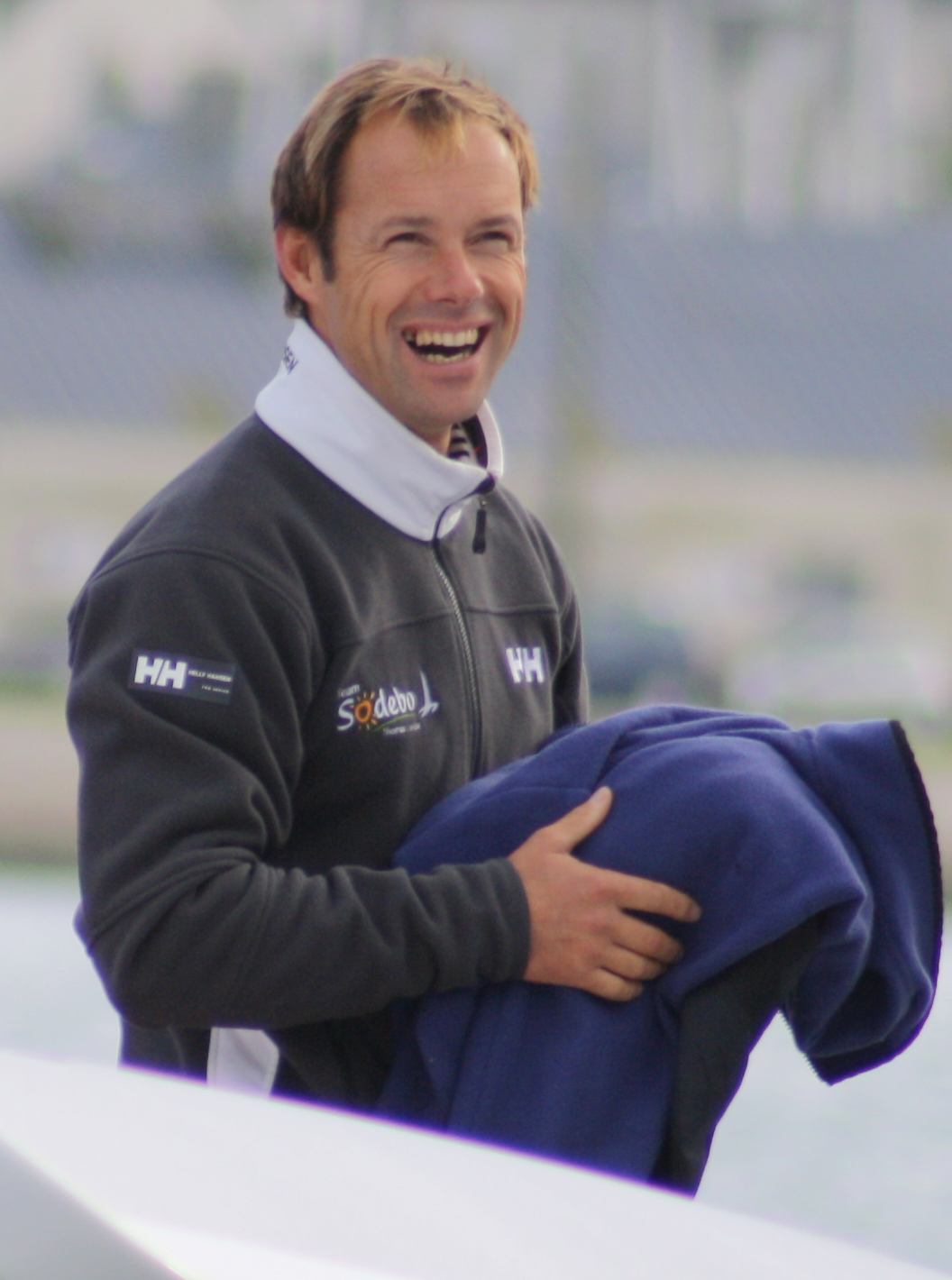
- Coville in 2010

Personal information
- Nationality: French
- Born: 10 May 1968 (age 58) Rennes, France

Sailing career
- Sport: Sailing

Thomas Coville (French pronunciation: [tɔma kɔvil]; born 10 May 1968) is a French yacht racer.

Coville was born in Rennes. He participated in significant offshore races and record attempts. In April 2012, he achieved 7 circumnavigations of the world, on mono or multihulls, single-handed or as sought-after helmsman. He held the around the world sailing record single-handed on the trimaran Sodebo Ultim in 49 days 3 hours 7 minutes and 38 seconds, until his record was broken by François Gabart in 2017 on trimaran Macif.

== Race achievements ==
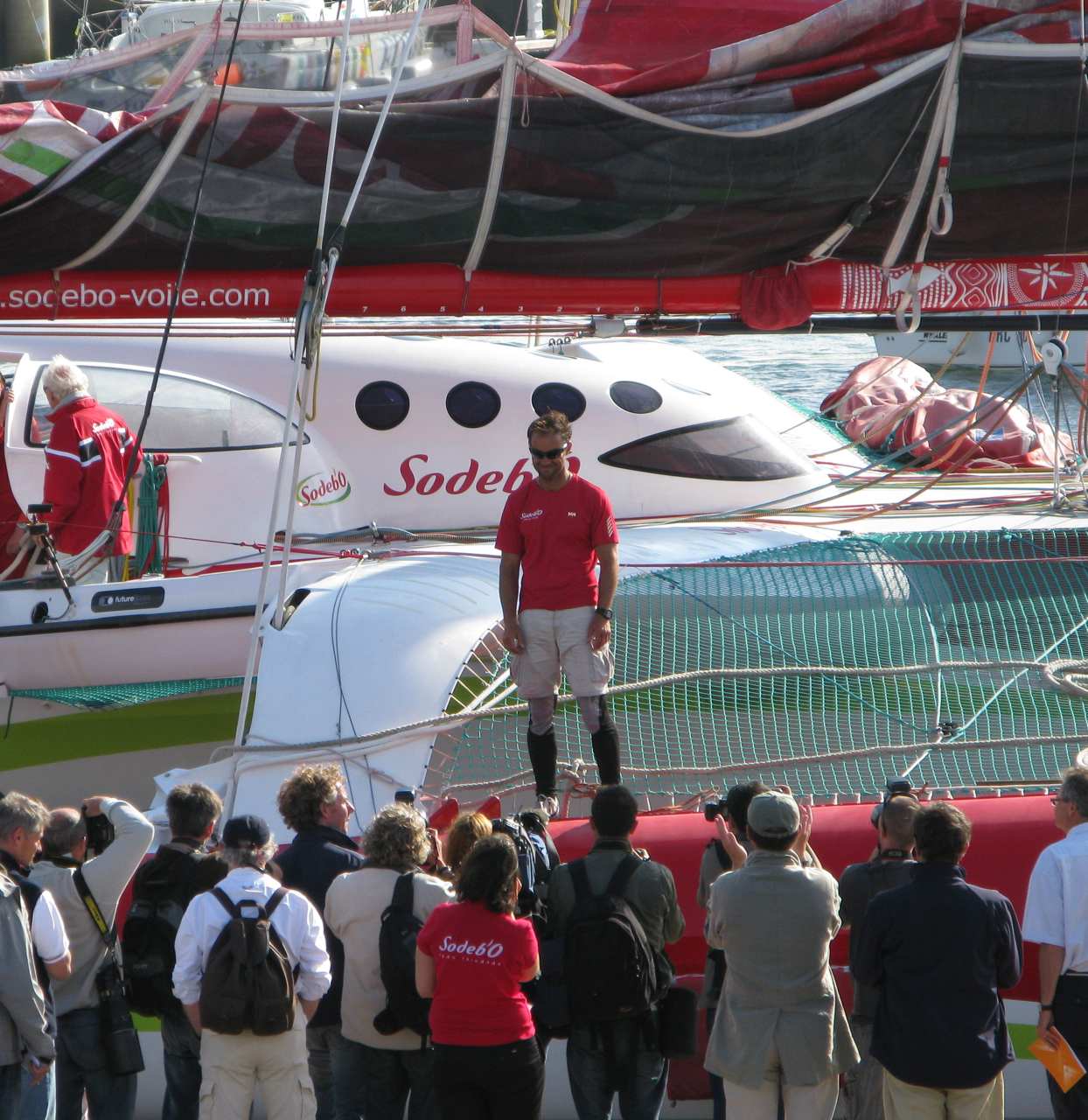
Thomas Coville on trimaran Sodebo arriving in Brest, France the 15th of July 2008.

- 1985-1991 : skipper of Polytechnique on the Tour de France à la voile
- 1997 : 2nd of the Mini Transat
- 1998 : Winner of the Route du Rhum on monohull with Aquitaine Innovations
- 1999 : Winner of the Transat Jacques Vabre, with Hervé Jan on monohull Sodeb'O
- 2001 : 6th of Vendée Globe 2000–2001 in 110 days and 7 hours
- 2004 : 2nd of The transat on trimaran ORMA Sodeb'O
- 2005 : Winner of the Oryx Quest on Doha 2006 with skipper Brian Thompson.
- 2006 : 3rd of the Route du Rhum on trimaran ORMA Sodeb'O.
- 2010 : 3rd of the Route du Rhum on trimaran ORMA Sodeb'O
- 2012 : Volvo Ocean Race, aboard Groupama 4, with skipper Franck Cammas.

== Records and attempts ==
=== Single-handed ===
- 2005 : North Atlantic crossing (east to west) also called the "discovery route" (Cádiz – San Salvador Island): in 10 days 11 hours, 50 minutes and 46 seconds
- 2005 : Record Miami – New York in 3 days 05 hours and 12 seconds.
- 2006 : Record around Britain and Ireland in 6 days, 6 hours, 40 minutes and 31 seconds
- 2008 : 24 hours distance record single-handed on Sodeb'O with 619,3 milles.
- 2008 : North Atlantic crossing (west to east) (New York – Cape Lizard) single-handed.
- 2008-2009 : Attempt on the around the world sailing record single-handed on the trimaran Sodeb'O in 59 days, 20 hours, 47 minutes and 43 seconds (2 days more than Francis Joyon's record)
- 2011 : Attempt on the around the world sailing record single-handed on the trimaran Sodeb'O in 61 days, 7 minutes and 32 seconds (3 days more than Francis Joyon's record).
- 2016 : 24 hours distance record single-handed on the trimaran Sodebo Ultim with 714 nm (29,75 knots). Thomas Coville is the first sailor to beat the 700 nm mark in 24h single-handedly.
- 2016 : around the world sailing record single-handed on Sodebo Ultim in 49 days 3 hours 7 minutes and 38 seconds (7 days less than Francis Joyon's previous record).
- 2017 : North Atlantic crossing (west to east) (New York – Cape Lizard) single-handed on Sodebo Ultim in 4 days 11 hours 10 minutes and 23 seconds (28.35 knots, 15 hours less than Francis Joyon's previous record).

=== Crewed ===
- 1997 : Jules Verne Trophy with Olivier de Kersauson, skipper of Sport-Élec
- 2009 : Trans-Mediterranean (Marseille-Carthage), in 17 hours 8 minutes 23 seconds, with Franck Cammas skipper of Groupama 3.
- 2010 : Jules Verne Trophy with Franck Cammas, skipper of Groupama 3
- 2020 : During his attempt for the Jules Verne Trophy, December 5 of 2020, Thomas Coville on Sodebo Ultim 3 covered 889.9 miles in 24 hours (37.1 knots average).
