= Geronimo (yacht) =

French trimaran

- Designer(s): VPLP
- Launched: 2001

Racing career
- Skippers: Olivier de Kersauson

Specifications
- Displacement: 20 t (20 long tons; 22 short tons)
- Length: 33.80 m (110.9 ft) (LOA); 32 m (105 ft) (LWL)
- Beam: 21.1 m (69 ft)
- Mast height: 39 m (128 ft)
- Sail area: 535 m^{2} (5,760 sq ft) (upwind); 925 m^{2} (9,960 sq ft) (downwind)
- Crew: 10

Sodebo Ultim
- Designer(s): VPLP
- Launched: 2013 (re-launch after modification)

Racing career
- Skippers: Thomas Coville

Specifications
- Displacement: 13 t (13 long tons; 14 short tons)
- Length: 102 ft (31 m)
- Beam: 70 ft (21 m)
- Mast height: 115 ft (35 m)
- Sail area: 4,779 sq ft (444.0 m^{2}) (upwind); 7,136 sq ft (663.0 m^{2}) (downwind)
- Crew: 1

Geronimo is a French trimaran designed to break great offshore records. It was skippered by the French yachtsman Olivier de Kersauson. It was launched on Saturday 29 September 2001 in Brest, France by Marie Tabarly. In January 2003, skipper Kersauson said that the Geronimo was attacked by a giant squid during an attempt to win the Jules Verne Trophy.

In February 2013, the Geronimo was purchased by the agri-food company Sodebo and renamed Sodebo Ultim. The trimaran was heavily modified with a shorter and lighter central hull, a new mast and new cockpit configuration, making it more suitable for long-distance solo sailing. It is now skippered by Thomas Coville.

In 2019, Actual acquired Sodebo Ultim' and the boat was renamed Actual Leader.

== Successor bearing Sodebo name ==
On 20 December 2024, the boat's successor, the Ultim class Sodebo Ultim 3, built to an innovative new design and launched on 2 March 2019, set off on an attempt at the Jules Verne Trophy.

== Records ==
- 29 April 2004, after three unsuccessful attempts, Geronimo, skippered by Olivier de Kersauson, wins the Jules Verne Trophy from Bruno Peyron in 63 days, 13 hours and 59 minutes. Trophy taken back in 2005 by the same Bruno Peyron.
- July 2005 : Fastest sailing around Australia in nearly 17 days and 13 hours.
- November 2005 : Geronimo, skippered by Olivier de Kersauson, breaks the Los Angeles - Honolulu record in 4 days and 19 hours. This record was broken in July 2015 by Lending Club 2 co-skippered by Renaud Laplanche, and Ryan Breymaier with a time of 3 days, 18 hours, 9 seconds.
- April 2006 : Transpacific, east to west (San Francisco - Yokohama) in 14 days and 22 hours. Record beaten in 2008 by Gitana 13.
- June 2006 : Transpacific, west to east (Yokohama - San Francisco) in 13 days and 22 hours.
- December 2016 : Around the world sailing record single-handed as Sodebo Ultim by Thomas Coville in 49 days 3 hours 7 minutes and 38 seconds (7 days less than Francis Joyon's previous record).

Records
Preceded by Orange with Bruno Peyron	Jules Verne Trophy; 2004–2005	Succeeded by Orange II with Bruno Peyron
