= Philippe Monnet =

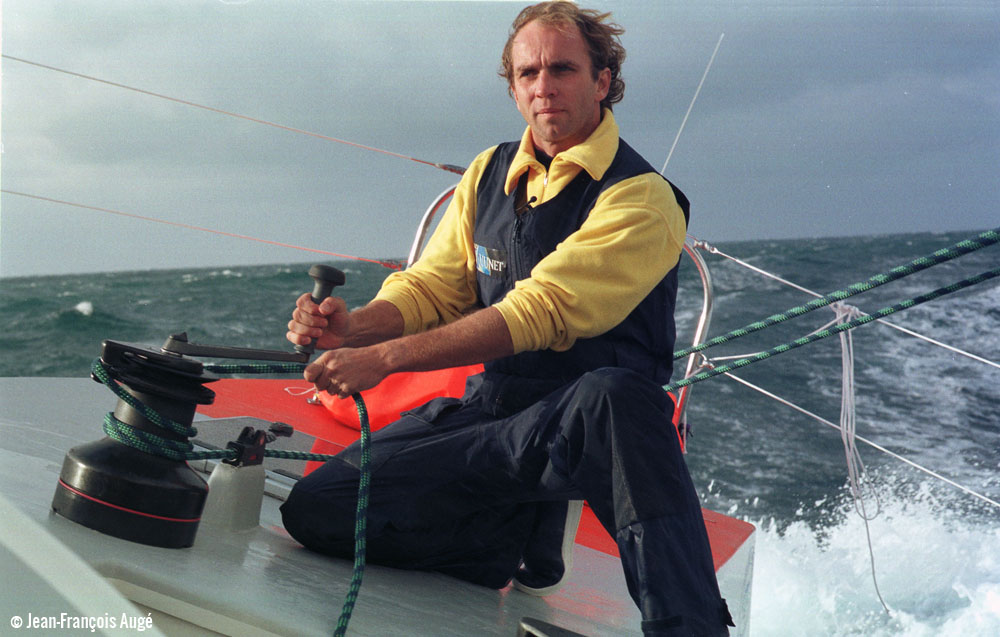
Philippe Monnet

Philippe Monnet (born 31 January 1959) is a single-handed sailor from France, born in La Clusaz. He is the brother in law of French singer Julien Clerc.

== Biography ==
Originally from La Clusaz, he is a pioneer of maritime routes and a single-handed and crewed sailing record holder. He has accumulated more 250 000 nautical miles in single-handed or crewed races. He set a new record during his first solo round the world trip.

He sailed the 1981–82 Whitbread Round the World Race on board Vivanapoli.

== Records ==
- 1988: World record - solo sail on "Kriter" (Olivier de Kersauson's trimaran) (129d 19h 17').
- 1989: Record New York City - San Francisco, multihull and solo (81d 5h).
- 1990: Record Hong-Kong - London (Tea Route), multihull and solo (67d 10h 26').
- 1998: 6th place in the Route du Rhum, aboard a monohull
- 2000: Record for non-stop reverse circumnavigation on "Uunet" (previously Philippe Poupon's "Fleury Michon"), monohull (151d 19h 54').

== Bibliography ==
- J'ai entraperçu les moustaches du Diable (2000)
- Le Monde à l'envers (2000) ISBN 2-7234-3445-1

== Paris-Dakar ==
Monnet won the Paris-Dakar twice: as co-driver alongside Hubert Auriol in 1992, and with Jean-Louis Schlesser in 1999. He holds a total of 5 rally wins (two in the rallye de Tunisie, and one in the Baja d'Italie.
