= Loïck Peyron =

French yachtsman

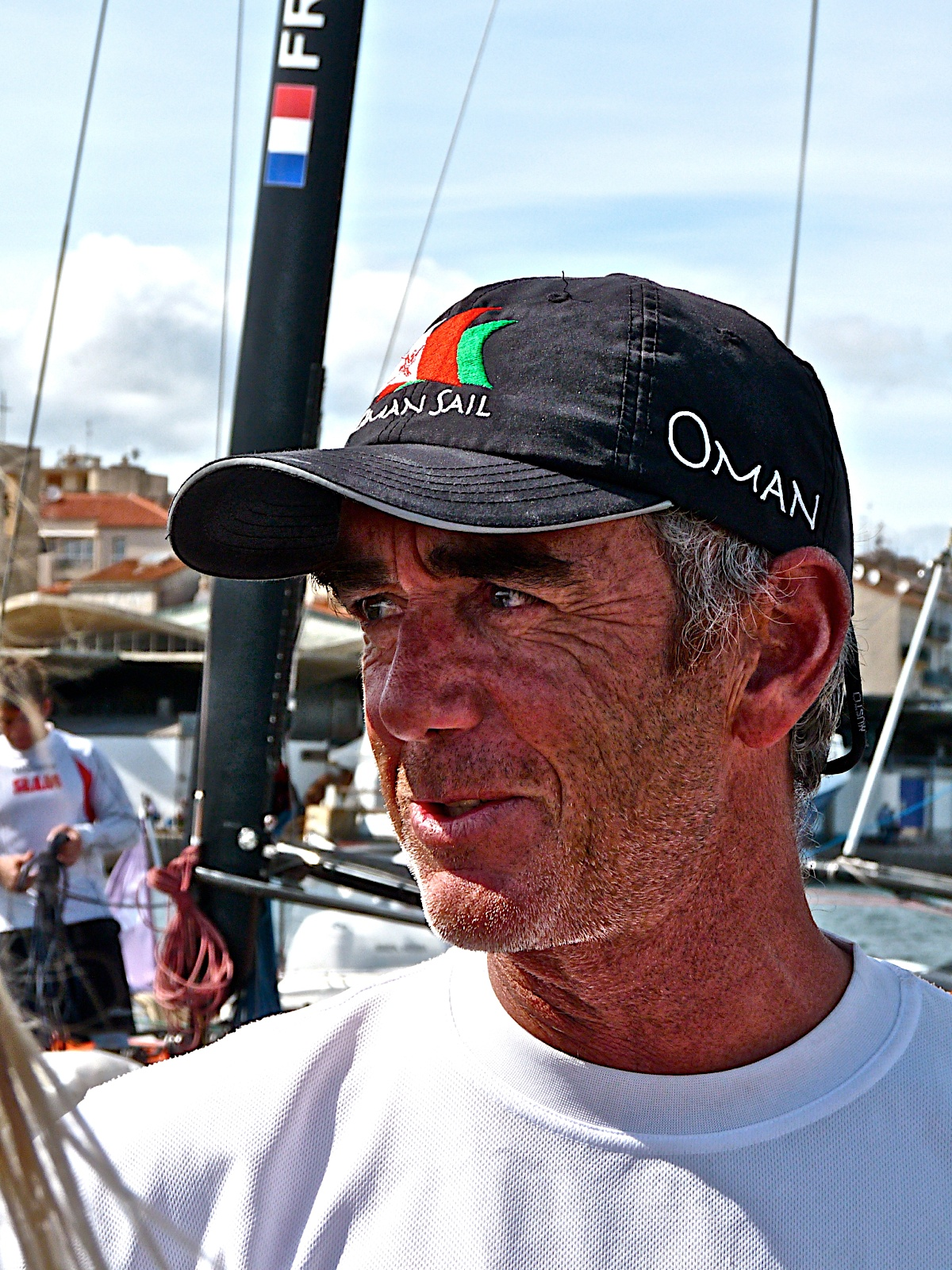

Personal information
- Born: 1 December 1959 (age 66) Nantes, France

Sailing career
- Sport: Sailing
- Class: ORMA

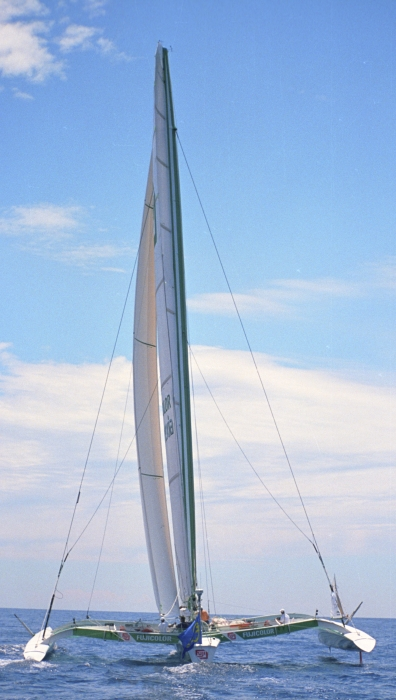
Loïck Peyron's trimaran Fujicolor

Loïck Peyron (born 1 December 1959 in Nantes) is a French yachtsman, younger brother of the yachtsman Bruno Peyron.

He is particularly famous for winning many races in the 1990s on board his trimaran Fujicolor.

Among his notable achievements, he won the ORMA Championship four times in 1996, 1997, 1999 and 2002, the STAR transatlantic race three times, the Transat Jacques Vabre twice and the Jules Verne Trophy in 2012.

After Benjamin de Rothschild gave him control of the Gitana Team in April 2006, the team built Gitana Eighty, a 60 feet monohull, launched in July 2007 with which Loick Peyron won the Transat. On 9 December 2008, he began his participation in the 2008-2009 Vendée Globe with Gitana Eighty. After having led the race for 16 days, Gitana Eighty's mast broke.

In 2010, Peyron sailed in the 33rd America's Cup as part of the Alinghi Team, in the roles of 'floater' in race 1 and relief helmsman in race 2. Alinghi were defeated by the American challenger BMW Oracle Racing. In early 2012 he won the Jules Verne Trophy in a time of 45 days 13 hours 42 minutes 53 seconds, breaking Franck Cammas previous record by 2 days.

In late 2012 he was asked to join Artemis Racing, Challenger of Record for the 34th America's Cup, as one of the helmsmen.

In November 2014, he won the Route du Rhum single-handed transat on Banque Populaire VII maxi trimaran. He set the new record, travelling from Brittany to Guadeloupe in 7 days 15 hours 8 minutes and 32 seconds (22.93 kts average speed) and beating Lionel Lemonchois 2006 record by 2h 10mn 34s.

In May 2016, he entered the Single-Handed Trans-Atlantic Race aboard Pen Duick II, the boat sailed by Éric Tabarly to win this very race in 1964.

== Achievements ==
Sources:

- 2014
  - Route du Rhum transat : Winner on Banque Populaire VII maxi trimaran. And record of the race.
- 2012
  - Jules Verne Trophy on Banque Populaire V in 45 days 13 hours 42 minutes 53 seconds.
- 2011
  - Round the British Isles outright record on Banque Populaire V in 3 days, 3 hours and 49 minutes.
  - Fastnet race: outright record on Banque Populaire V in 1 day 8 hours 48 minutes and 46 seconds.
  - Record SNSM : Winner on the multihull Banque Populaire V
  - Barcelona World Race : Winner on Virbac-Paprec 3 with Jean-Pierre Dick
- 2009
  - Challenge Julius Baer : Winner on Okalys (D35)
- 2008
  - Record SNSM : Winner on the monohull Gitana Eighty
  - the Artemis Transat : Winner on Gitana Eighty.
  - Spi Ouest France : Winner on Domaine du Mont d'Arbois.
- 2007
  - Transat Ecover BtoB : Winner on the monohull Gitana Eighty
  - Transat Jacques Vabre : 8th on Gitana Eighty with Jean-Baptiste Levaillant
  - Bol d'Or du Léman : Winner on Okalys (D35)
- 2006
  - Challenge Julius Baer : Winner on Okalys (D35)
- 2005
  - Bol d'Or du Léman : Winner on Okalys (D35)
  - Challenge Julius Baer : Winner on Okalys (D35)
  - Transat Jacques Vabre : Winner together with Jean-Pierre Dick on the monohull Virbac-Paprec
  - Route des Iles à la voile : Winner with Dimitri Deruelle
  - Trophée Clairefontaine : Winner
- 2003
  - Transat Jacques Vabre : 2nd with Jean-Luc Nélias on Belgacom
  - Solitaire du Figaro : 6th
- 2002
  - Trophée Clairefontaine : Winner
- 2001
  - Transat Jacques Vabre : 3rd on trimaran Fujifilm
  - The Race : 2nd on catamaran Innovation Explorer. He broke the 24 hours distance record.
- 1999
  - Trophée Clairefontaine : Winner
  - Transat Jacques Vabre : 1st on the trimaran Fujicolor II, with Franck Proffit
  - Course de l'Europe : 1st on trimaran Fujicolor II
- 1998
  - Trophée Clairefontaine : Winner
  - Route du Rhum : 5th on Fujicolor II
  - Course de Phares : Winner on Fujicolor II
- 1997
  - Trophée Clairefontaine : Winner
  - Course de l'Europe : Winner on Fujicolor II
  - Transat Jacques Vabre : 3rd on Fujicolor II
- 1996
  - The Europe 1 Star (Transat) : Winner on Fujicolor II
  - Trophée Clairefontaine : Winner
  - Transat Québec-Saint-Malo : Winner on Fujicolor II
  - Grand prix de Fécamp : Winner on Fujicolor II
- 1995
  - Trophée Clairefontaine : Winner
  - Course de l'Europe : Winner on Fujicolor II
  - Grand prix de Fécamp : Winner on Fujicolor II
  - Grand prix de Saint Nazaire : Winner on Fujicolor II
- 1994
  - Trophée des Multicoques : Winner on Fujicolor II
  - Twostar : 2nd on Fujicolor II
- 1993
  - Trophée des Multicoques : Winner on Fujicolor II
  - Transat Jacques Vabre : 3rd monohull on Fujicolor III
  - Course de l'Europe : Winner on Fujicolor II
- 1992
  - The Europe 1 Star (Transat) : Winner on Fujicolor
- 1990
  - Vendée Globe : 2nd on Lada Poch III
- 1989
  - Lorient Saint Bathélemy Lorient : Winner in the monohull category.
- 1988
  - Transat Québec-Saint-Malo : 2nd on Lada Poch II
  - The CSTAR (Transat) : 3rd on Lada Poch II
- 1987
  - La Baule-Dakar : Winner on Lada Poch II with Jacques Delorme
  - GP de Boulogne (Formule 40) : 4th on Lada Poch
- 1986
  - Route du Rhum : 5th on Lada Poch I
  - Solitaire du Figaro : 4th on Lada Poch
- 1985
  - Course de l'Europe : Winner on Lada Poch I (Class III)
- 1984
  - Transat Québec-Saint-Malo : 5th, teammate of Mike Birch, on the catamaran Formule Tag
- 1983
  - La Baule-Dakar : 4th on Lada Poch I
  - Lorient — Les Bermudes — Lorient : 5th on Transat TAG Québec
- 1982
  - Route du Rhum : 17th on La Baule-Teletota
  - La Rochelle – New-Orleans : 9th with Bruno Peyron on Jaz
- 1981
  - La Baule-Dakar : 21st on Acoustique HRC
- 1980
  - Solitaire du Figaro : Winner of the 4th stage
- 1979
  - Mini Transat : 26th on Sogeport-Alcor

Records
Preceded by Groupama 3 with Franck Cammas	Jules Verne Trophy; 2012–present	Succeeded by Incumbent
