= Ellen MacArthur =

English yachtswoman (born 1976)

Dame Ellen MacArthur DBE
- MacArthur in 2010
- Born: Ellen Patricia MacArthur; 8 July 1976 (age 50); Whatstandwell, Derbyshire, England
- Occupations: Sailor; charity founder
- Known for: Previous holder of fastest solo circumnavigation of the globe in a yacht
- Website: ellenmacarthur.com

Dame Ellen Patricia MacArthur DBE (born 8 July 1976) is an English retired sailor and charity founder. On 7 February 2005, she broke the world record for the fastest solo circumnavigation of the globe, a feat which gained her international renown. She held the record until early 2008. Following her retirement from professional sailing on 2 September 2010, MacArthur announced the launch of the Ellen MacArthur Foundation, a charity that works with business and education to promote a circular economy.

== Personal life ==
MacArthur was born in Whatstandwell near Matlock in Derbyshire. She acquired her early interest in sailing by her desire to emulate her idol at the time, Sophie Burke.

== Professional sailing career ==
MacArthur first came to general prominence in 2001 when she finished second in the Vendée Globe solo round-the-world sailing race in her Owen Clarke/Rob Humphreys designed Kingfisher (named after her sponsors, Kingfisher plc). She was subsequently appointed a Member of the Order of the British Empire (MBE) for services to sport. At 24, she was the youngest competitor to complete the voyage.

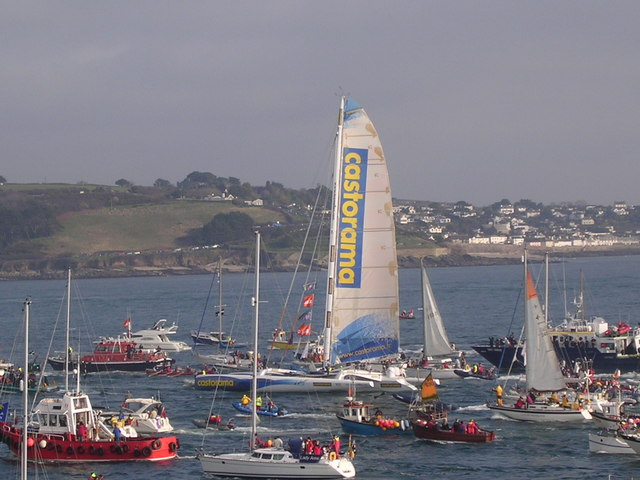
Ellen MacArthur on her arrival in 2005

In 2007 MacArthur headed up BT Team Ellen, a three-person sailing team which includes Australian Nick Moloney and Frenchman Sébastien Josse.

In October 2009 MacArthur announced her intention to retire from competitive racing to concentrate on the subject of resource and energy use in the global economy.

== Sailing records ==
In June 2000, MacArthur sailed the monohull Kingfisher from Plymouth, UK to Newport, Rhode Island, USA in 14 days, 23 hours, 11 minutes. This is the current record for a single-handed woman monohull east-to-west passage, and also the record for a single-handed woman in any vessel.

MacArthur's second place in the 2000–2001 Vendée Globe, with a time of 94 days, 4 hours and 25 minutes, was the world record for a single-handed, non-stop, monohull circumnavigation by a woman. The record stood for 20 years until Clarisse Crémer beat it in 2020–2021 edition of the Vendée Globe.

In June 2004, MacArthur sailed her trimaran B&Q/Castorama from Ambrose Light, Lower New York Bay, USA to Lizard Point, Cornwall, UK in 7 days, 3 hours, 50 minutes. This set a new world record for a transatlantic crossing by women, beating the previous crewed record as well as the singlehanded version.

In 2005, MacArthur beat Francis Joyon's existing world record for a single-handed non-stop circumnavigation. MacArthur in the trimaran B&Q/Castorama sailed 27,354 nautical miles (50,660 km) at an average speed of 15.9 knots. Her time of 71 days, 14 hours, 18 minutes 33 seconds beat Joyon's then world record time by 1 day, 8 hours, 35 minutes and 49 seconds. She had no more than 20 minutes' sleep at a time during the voyage, having to be on constant lookout day and night. Robin Knox-Johnston described her time as an "amazing achievement". She held the record until January 2008, when Joyon reclaimed it sailing IDEC 2.

Her boat, now named USE IT AGAIN is skippered by French professional sailor, Romain Pilliard.

== Popular culture ==
In 2009 MacArthur appeared on BBC Radio 4's Desert Island Discs. Her chosen book was The SAS Survival Handbook by John "Lofty" Wiseman and her luxury item was a fluffy worm mascot.

MacArthur was also the last record holder on Star in a Reasonably-Priced Car on the BBC's Top Gear television driving programme until the eighth series, when the car and rules were changed, and previous records were removed. The competition was a timed lap of a racetrack in a Suzuki Liana. She completed the lap in 1 minute 46.7 seconds, beating Jimmy Carr by 0.2 seconds. MacArthur won Top Gear's Fastest Driver of the Year award in 2005.

== Books ==
In 2002, MacArthur released her first autobiography entitled Taking on the World. Later she wrote Race Against Time, published in 2005, a day-by-day account of her record journey around the world. In September 2010, she published a second autobiography entitled Full Circle.

== Charity ==
=== Ellen MacArthur Cancer Trust ===
In 2003, MacArthur set up the Ellen MacArthur Trust (now the Ellen MacArthur Cancer Trust), a registered charity, to 8 to 24-year olds sailing to help them regain their confidence while recovering from cancer, leukaemia and other serious illnesses.

In 2008, MacArthur joined other sports celebrities to raise £4 million for the Rainbows children's hospice. The aim is to give terminally ill young people their own customised sleeping unit to enable children in separate age groups to have their families stay with them.

=== Ellen MacArthur Foundation ===
A 2011 Ellen MacArthur Foundation video essay explaining the circular economy concept

The Ellen MacArthur Foundation (EMF) is a UK registered charity which promotes the idea of a circular economy. It does this by developing and promoting the concept of a circular economy, working with businesses, policy makers and academics.

Founded on 23 June 2009, the foundation was publicly launched on 2 September 2010 by MacArthur at the Science Museum. The charity was inspired by MacArthur's sailing experiences.

On 17 May 2017, the Ellen MacArthur Foundation and Prince of Wales' International Sustainability Unit launched a US$2 million prize fund for innovations which work towards the management of waste plastics.

The Ellen MacArthur Foundation is a founding member and partner of the Platform for Accelerating the Circular Economy (PACE), which was launched out of the World Economic Forum.

=== Nancy Blackett Trust ===
MacArthur is Patron of the Nancy Blackett Trust which owns and operates Ransome's yacht, Nancy Blackett.

== Awards and honours ==
On 8 February 2005, following her return to England, it was announced that she was to be made a Dame Commander of the Order of the British Empire (DBE) for services to sailing. She was the youngest person to ever receive this honour at the age of 28. This recognition was reminiscent of accolades previously bestowed upon Francis Drake and Francis Chichester when reaching home shores after their respective circumnavigations in 1580 and 1967. MacArthur was also granted the rank of Honorary Lieutenant Commander, Royal Naval Reserve on the same day.

In March 2008, in recognition of her achievement, she was appointed a Knight (Chevalier) of the French Legion of Honour by President Nicolas Sarkozy. She is a fluent French speaker.

Asteroid 20043 Ellenmacarthur is named after her, as is a new dinosaur species identified from fossil finds on the Isle of Wight: Istiorachis macarthurae, which had a sail-like feature on its back.
