= Orange II (boat) =

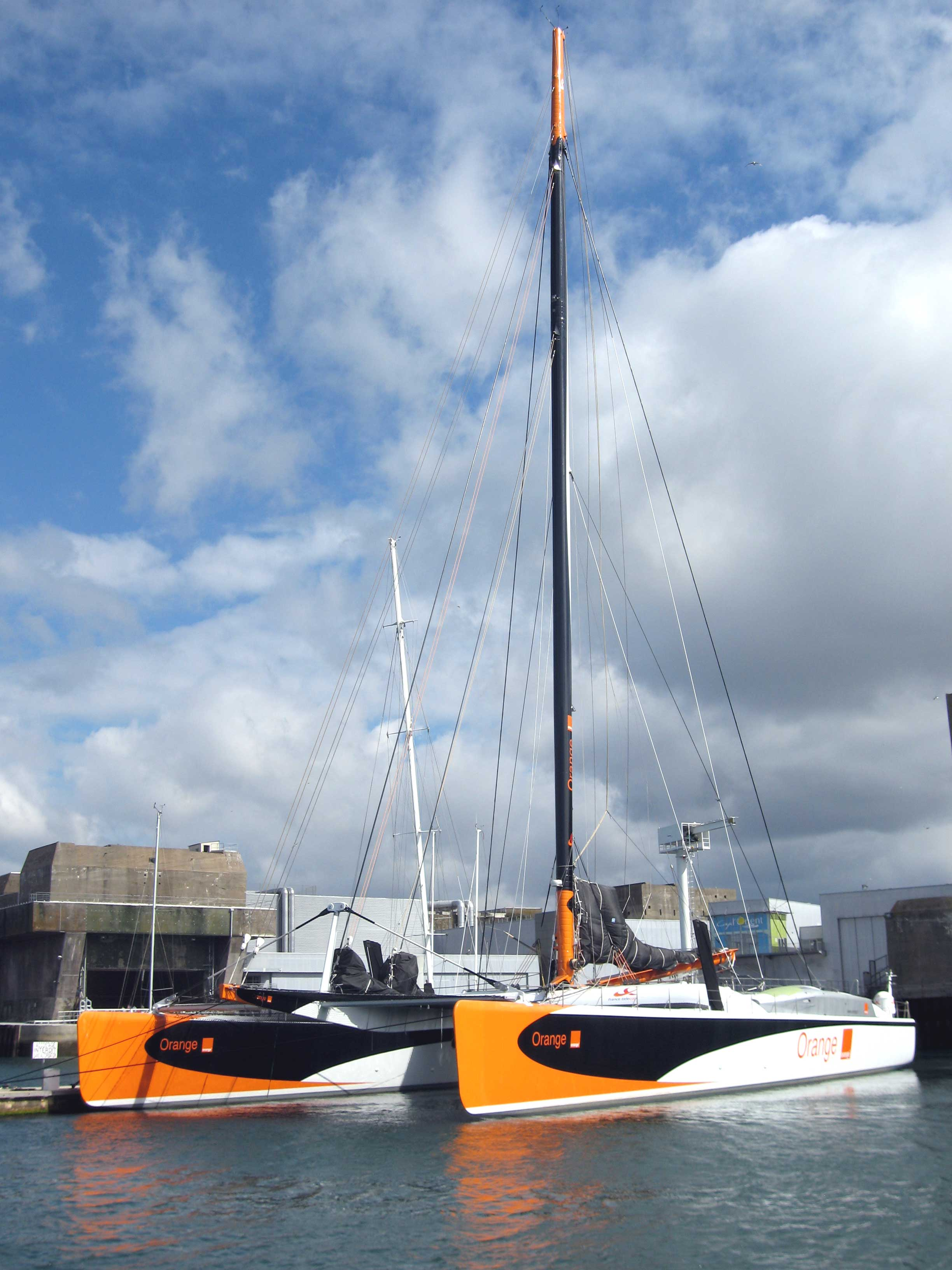
- Orange II in Lorient
- Designer(s): Gilles Ollier
- Builder: Multiplast
- Launched: 2003

Racing career
- Skippers: Bruno Peyron

Specifications
- Displacement: 30 t (30 long tons; 33 short tons)
- Length: 36.8 m (121 ft) (LOA)
- Beam: 18 m (59 ft)
- Draft: 2.5 m (8 ft 2 in); 5.5 m (18 ft)
- Sail area: 800 m^{2} (8,600 sq ft) (upwind); 1,100 m^{2} (12,000 sq ft) (downwind)

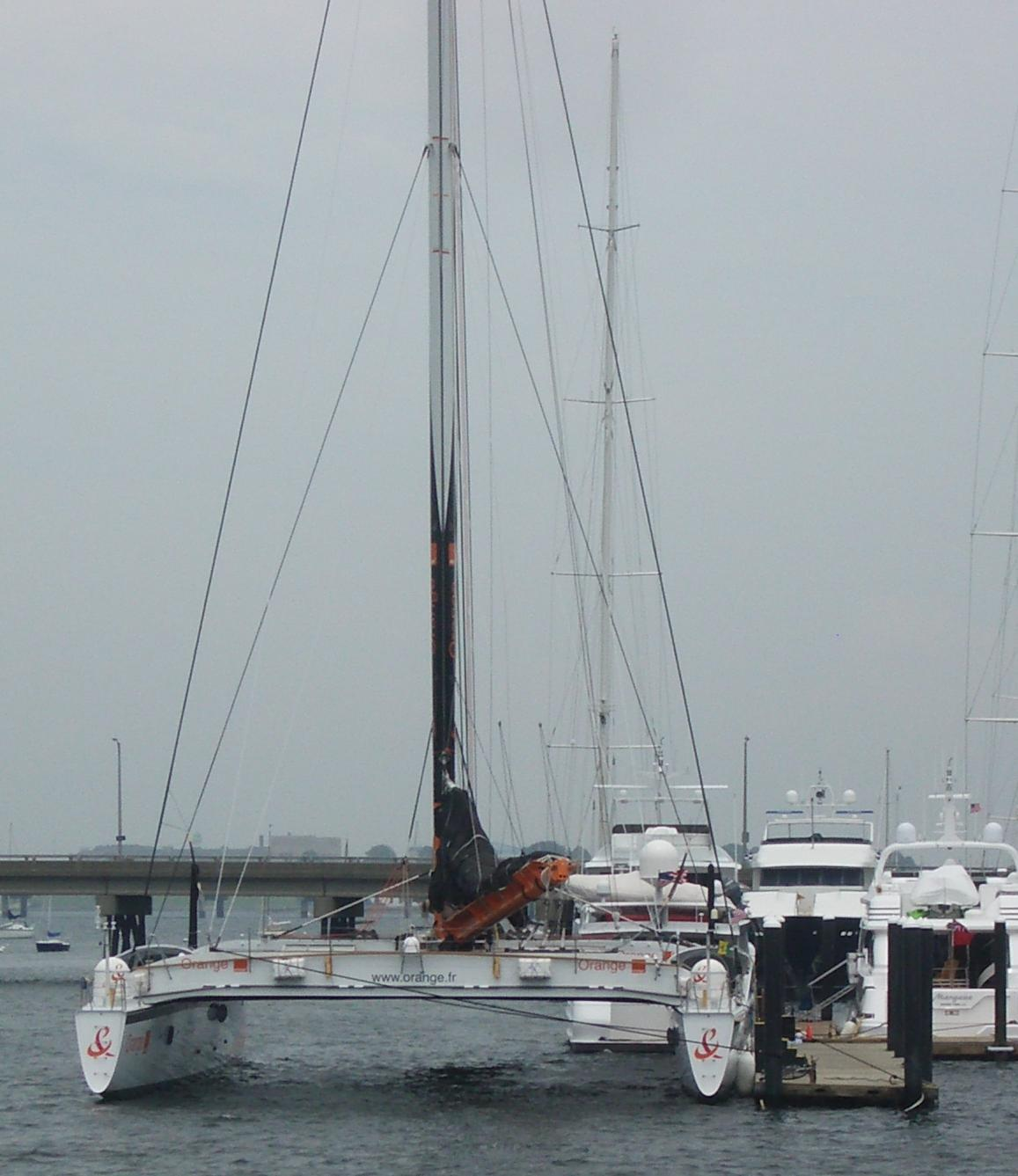
Orange II in Newport, RI.

Orange II is a large catamaran designed for ocean racing, a "maxicat". The boat is 36.80 m long and has a 45 m mast and was launched in 2003. It was designed by the Gilles Ollier Multiplast design team, built by the Multiplast yard in Vannes, France.

== History ==
Orange II held the Jules Verne Trophy for the fastest time around-the-world at 50 days, 16 hours, 20 minutes and 4 seconds from 2005 until March 2010. Orange II was skippered by Frenchman Bruno Peyron.

The sponsor, Orange (formerly France Télécom), discontinued its yacht racing activities. The boat was in storage at Multiplast for several years.

In February 2014, the boat was purchased by François Bich.

The yacht was restored and given the name VITALIA II. The first tests of the new craft took place in April 2015.

== See also ==
- List of large sailing yachts

Records
Preceded by Geronimo with Olivier de Kersauson	Jules Verne Trophy; 2005–2010	Succeeded by Groupama 3 with Franck Cammas
