= Franck Cammas =

French yachtsman

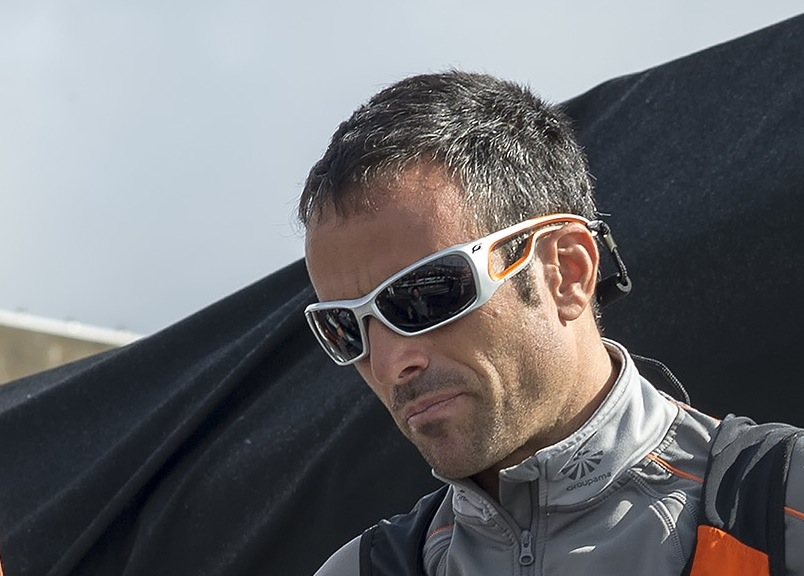
- Cammas in 2012

Personal information
- Born: 22 December 1972 (age 53) Aix-en-Provence, France

Sailing career
- Sport: Sailing
- Club: Yacht Club de France
- Class(es): ORMA, AC45, VO70, F18

Franck Cammas (born 22 December 1972) is a French yachtsman. He has lived in Brittany since his victory in the Challenge Espoir Crédit Agricole in 1994. After completing a two-year maths course for the 'Grandes écoles', as well as a piano academy, Franck Cammas finally opted for a career in sailing. In 1997, at the age of 24, he won the Solitaire du Figaro and a year later helmed his first trimaran christened Groupama. Despite his late entry into competition, he is one of the most talented and respected sailors in the Ocean Racing Multihull Association world.

Later, Cammas was skipper of the 60-foot (18 m) trimaran Groupama 2, with which he won five ORMA championships. His last trimaran, the 103-foot (31 m) Groupama 3 was designed to break ocean racing records. Groupama 2 holds the record for being the fastest yacht in a transat Jacques Vabre race and Groupama 3 once broke the Jules Verne Trophy record, which she held for nearly two years.

In 2010, Cammas became testimonial and tester of technical sportswear for SLAM, Italian company producer of sailing technical sportswear.

After winning Route du Rhum and the Jules Verne Trophy in 2010, Cammas has switched from multihull to monohull racing and won the 2011–12 Volvo Ocean Race with the Open 70 Groupama 4.

Cammas is involved in the 2017 America's Cup as a skipper for Groupama Team France.

Cammas is the father of two girls and practices other sports including skiing, boardsports and cycling.

== Races won ==
- Winner of the Formula 18 St Barths Cata Cup in 2013
- Winner of the Nacra 17 French Elite Championship in 2013 at La Rochelle
- Winner of the French Match Racing Championship in 2013
- Winner of the International C Class Catamaran Championship (Little America's Cup) in 2013
- Winner of the Tour de France à la voile in 2013
- Winner of the Volvo Ocean race 2011-2012
- Overall winner of the 2010 Sevenstar Round Britain and Ireland race, on Groupama 70 (Open 70 ft monohull)
- Winner of the Transat Jacques Vabre in 2001, 2003 and 2007
- Winner of the Route du Rhum 2010 aboard Groupama 3, ultimate category
- Winner of the Transat Québec-Saint-Malo in 2000
- Winner of all the ORMA Grands prix in 2005 and 2006
- 5 ORMA World Champion titles (2000, 2001, 2003, 2004 and 2007)
- 2 Fico-Lacoste World Champion of skippers titles (2000 and 2004)
- 1 Multi-Cup (2006) World Champion title
- Winner of the Solitaire du Figaro in 1997
- Winner of the Trophée Clairefontaine (2000, 2006 and 2009)
- Winner of the Spi Ouest-France 2007 in Open 7.50
- Winner of the Bol d'or (Lake Geneva) 2008, aboard Zebra 7 (D35)
- Vice world champion of Formula 18 2008

== Records ==
- Transat Jacques Vabre (Trimarans ORMA): 10 days 38 minutes and 43 seconds with an average speed of 19,18 knots (2007).
- North Atlantic crossing (east to west) also called the "discovery route" (Cádiz–San Salvador): 7 days 10 hours 58 minutes and 53 seconds (1 May 2007)
- Miami – New York City : 1 day 11 hours 5 minutes and 20 seconds (4 June 2007)
- 24 hours distance record: 794 miles (average: 33.08 knots) (20 July 2007) >> A record held from 21 July 2007 to 1 August 2009
- North Atlantic crossing (west to east): 4 days 3 hours 57 minutes 54 seconds (23 July 2007) >> A record held from 24 July 2007 to 2 August 2009
- Round Britain and Ireland, on monohull, in 5 days 21 hours 26 minutes and 55 seconds. (23–29 August 2010)
- Mediterranean crossing record (Marseille–Carthage): 17 hours 08 minutes and 23 seconds (15/16 May 2009) >> A record held from 16 May 2009 to 15 May 2010
- Jules Verne Trophy: in 48 days 07 hours 44 minutes 52 seconds, 20 March 2010, a record held for nearly two years.

Records
| Preceded by Orange II with Bruno Peyron | Jules Verne Trophy; 2010–2012 | Succeeded by Banque Populaire V with Loïck Peyron |
