= Bruno Peyron =

French yachtsman (born 1955)

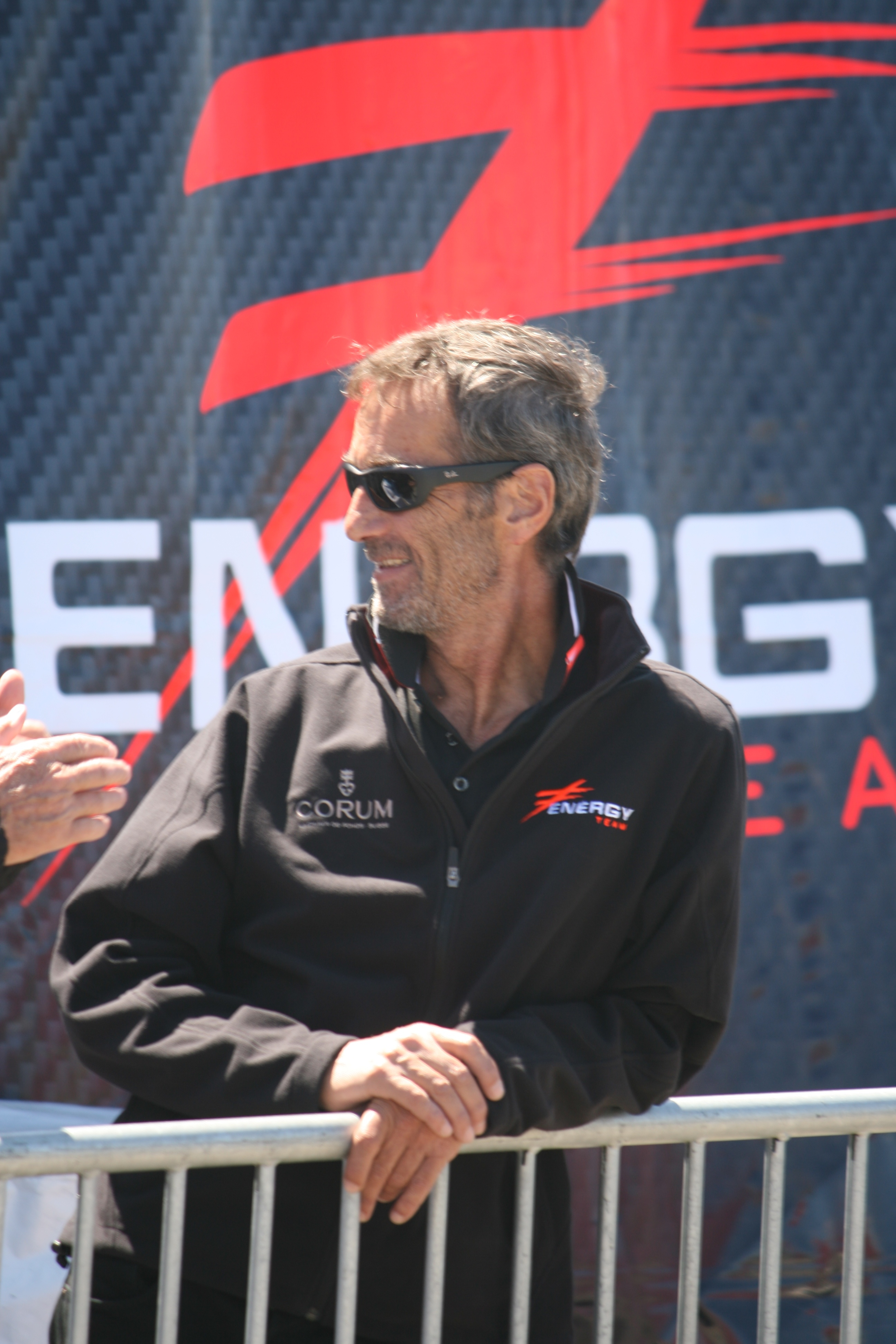
- Peyron in 2012

Personal information
- Full name: Bruno Tristan Peyron
- Born: 10 November 1955 (age 70) Angers, France

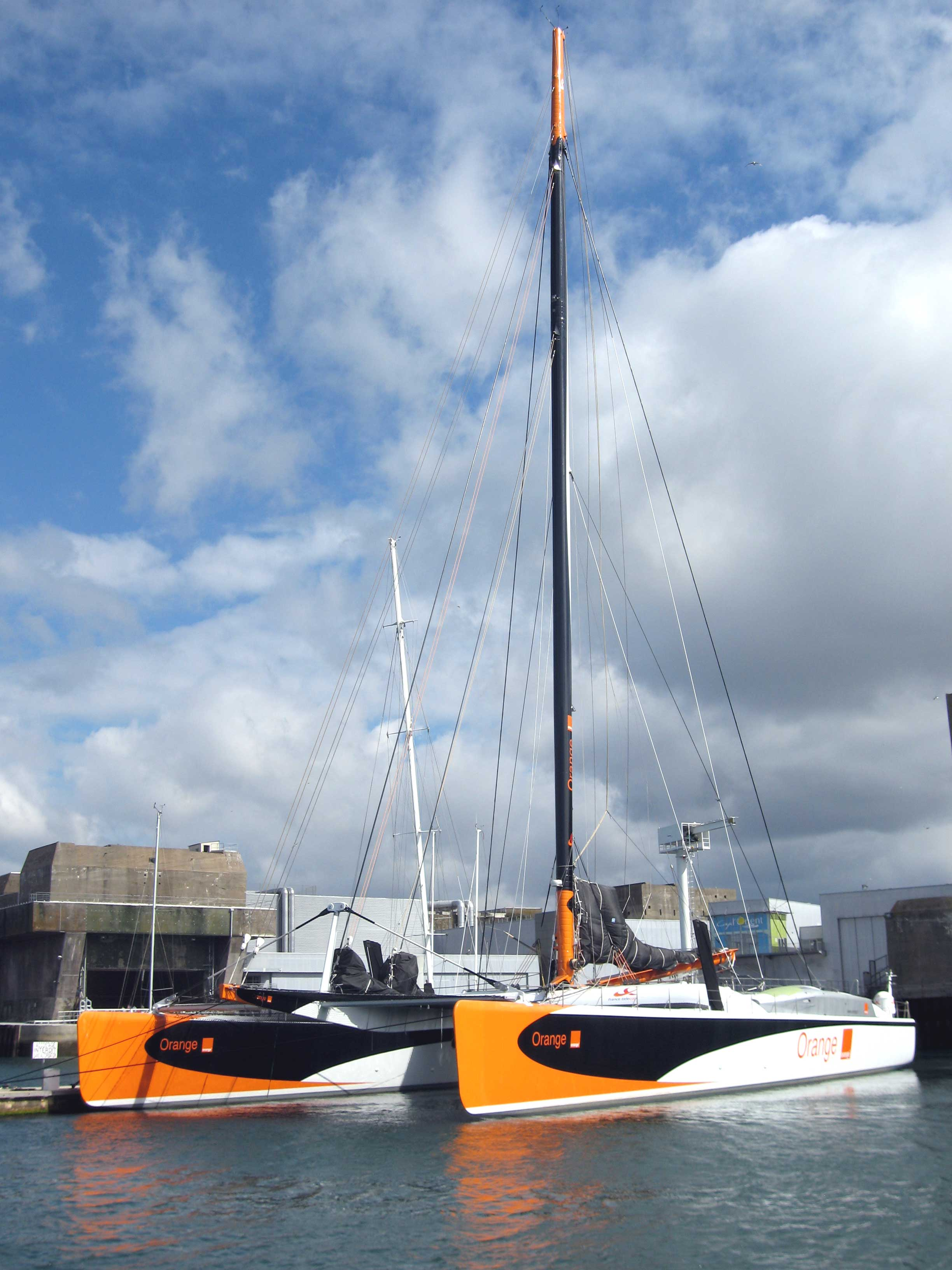
Orange II, Peyron's former yacht

Bruno Tristan Peyron (born 10 November 1955) is a French yachtsman who, along with his crew on the catamaran Orange II, broke the outright round-the-world sailing record in March 2005. He was the first winner of the Jules Verne Trophy in 1994, for completing a round-the-world trip in less than 80 days. Peyron was born in Angers, France and grew up in the French Atlantic coast city of La Baule. He has been one of the main organisers of the round-the-world-race, The Race.

== See also ==
- Circumnavigation
- List of circumnavigations

Records
Preceded by First holder Sport Elec with Olivier de Kersauson; Geronimo with Olivier de Kersauson	Jules Verne Trophy; 1993–1994; 2002–2004; 2005–2010	Succeeded by ENZA New Zealand with Knox-Johnston & Blake; Geronimo with Olivier de Kersauson; Groupama 3 with Franck Cammas
