= IDEC Sport =

Sailing vessel

IDEC SPORT
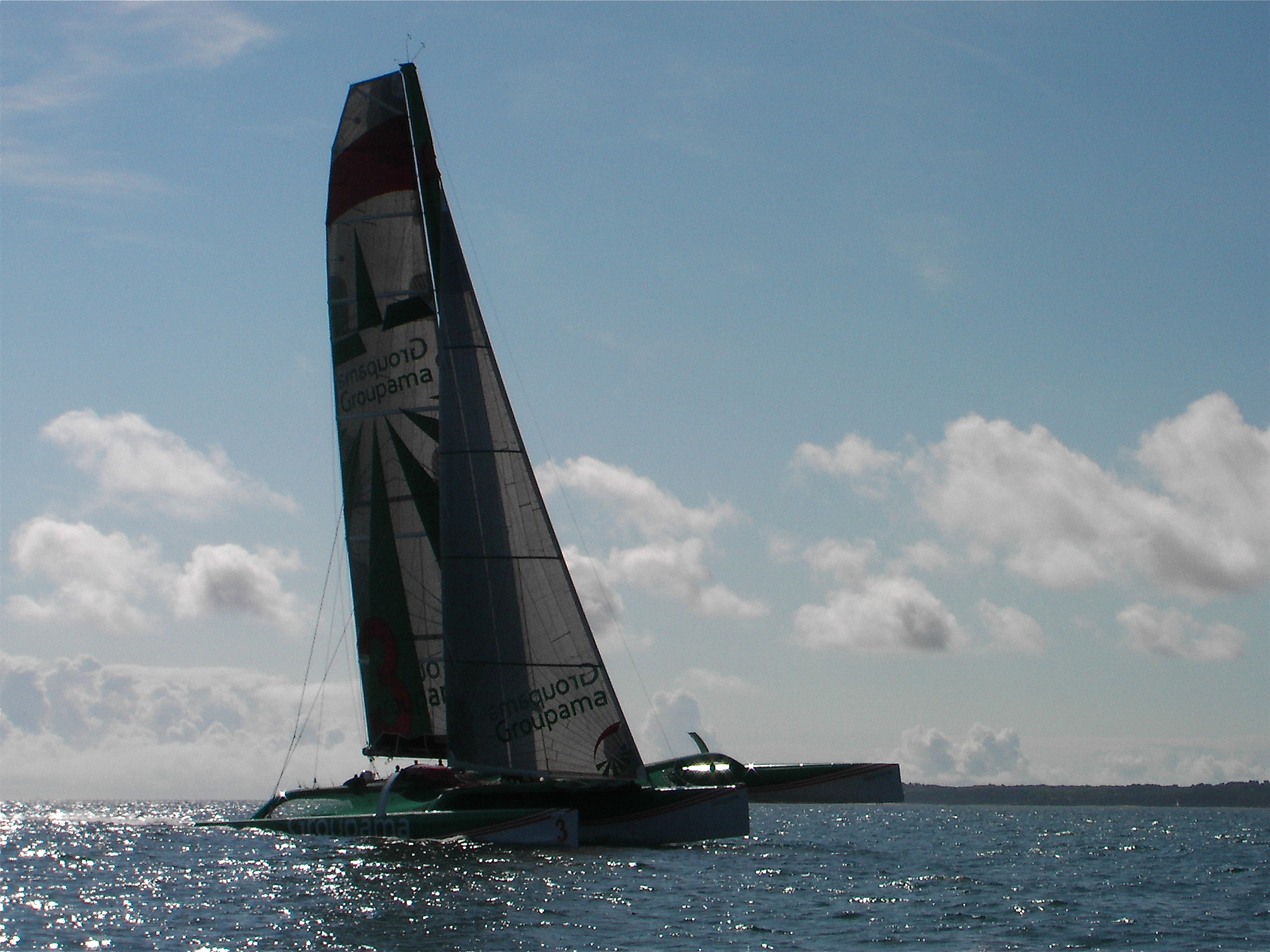
- Groupama 3 under sail.
- Other names: Groupama 3 Banque Populaire VII; Lending Club 2 IDEC 3
- Designer(s): VPLP
- Builder: Multiplast (Vannes, France)
- Launched: 7 June 2006
- Owner(s): Groupama Sailing Team (2006–2013); Banque Populaire (2013–2014); Renaud Laplanche (2015); IDEC (2015–)

Racing career
- Skippers: Franck Cammas ( (2006–2013)); Armel Le Cléac'h (2013); Loïck Peyron (2014); Renaud Laplanche (2015); Francis Joyon (2015)
- Notable victories: Jules Verne Trophy 2010; 2010 Route du Rhum; 2014 Route du Rhum; Jules Verne Trophy 2017; Route du Rhum 2018

Specifications
- Displacement: 18 t (18 long tons; 20 short tons)
- Length: 31.50 m (103.3 ft) (LOA)
- Beam: 22.50 m (73.8 ft)
- Draft: 5.70 m (18.7 ft)
- Mast height: 41 m (135 ft)
- Sail area: 828 m^{2} (8,910 sq ft)
- Crew: 10

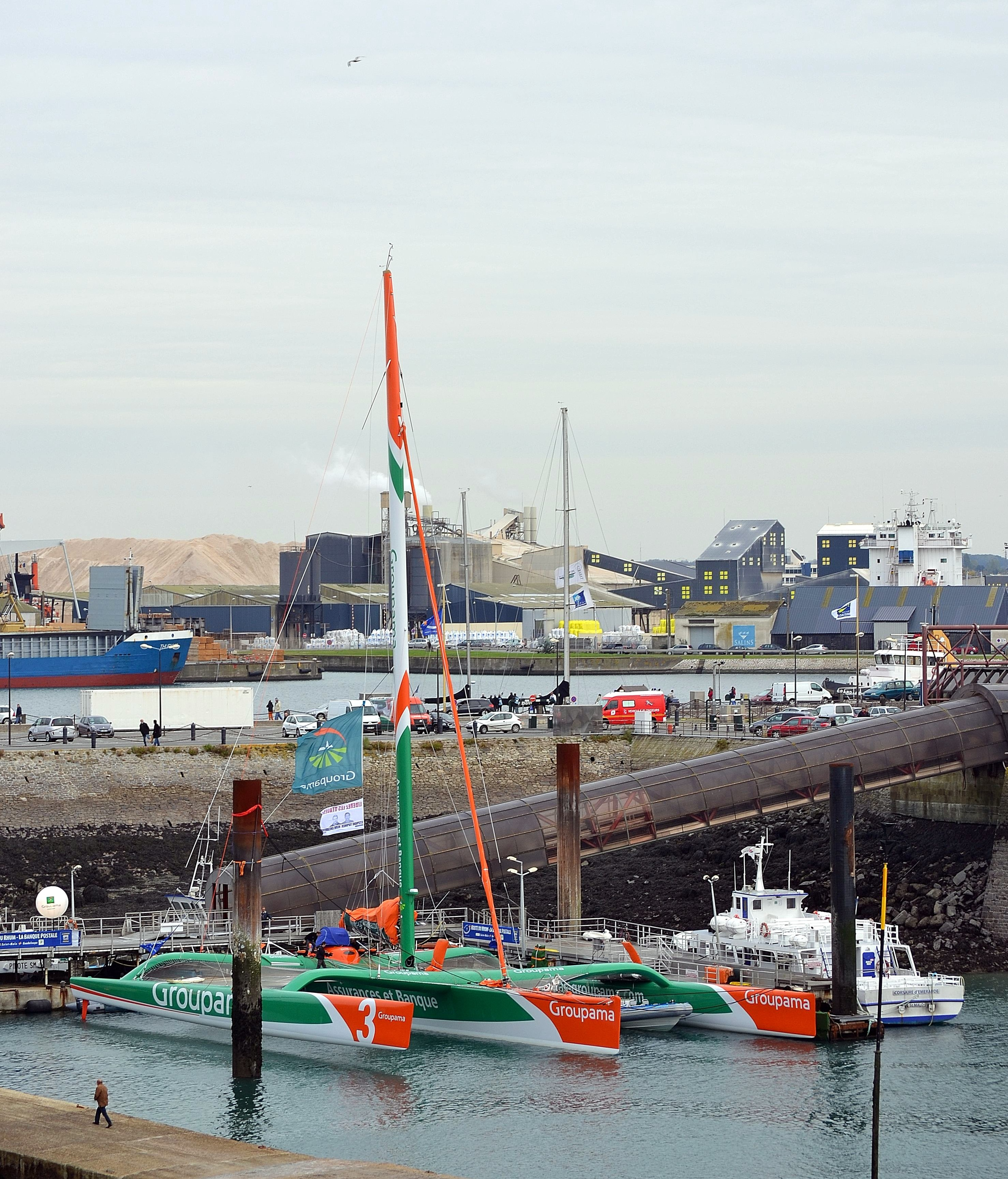
Groupama 3 in Saint-Malo, 2010

IDEC SPORT (formerly Groupama 3, Banque Populaire VII, Lending Club 2, IDEC 3) is a racing sailing trimaran designed for transoceanic record-setting. She is one of the world's fastest ocean-going sailing vessels. She was originally skippered by French yachtsman Franck Cammas, with a crew of ten and sponsored by the French insurance company Groupama. She is currently skippered by Françis Joyon.

Alexia Barrier has announced that she will skipper IDEC Sport in an attempt to break the circumnavigation record with an all-female crew in 2025.

== Design ==
Groupama 3 was designed by VPLP, built by Multiplast in Vannes, France and launched in June 2006.

== Records ==
Year	Record	Time	Status	Boat name	Crew	Notes	Ref.
2017	WSSRC Round the World Record (Crewed)	40d 23h 30m 30s	Current	IDEC Sport			
2010	WSSRC Round the World Record (Crewed)	48d 07h 44m 52s	Superseded	Grouparma 3			
2017	Jules Verne Trophy	40d 23h 30m 30s		IDEC Sport			
2010	Jules Verne Trophy	48d 07h 44m 52s		Grouparma 3			
2018	Route du Rhum Course Record	07d 14h 21m 47s			Francis Joyon		
2009-05-16	Trans-Mediterranean (Marseille–Carthage)	00d 17h 08m 23s				458 miles @26.04 knots	
2007-06-04	Route of the discovery (Cádiz–San Salvador Island)	07d 10h 58m 53s				3884 Nm @21.7 knots.	
2007-06-04	Miami–New York	01d 11h 05m 20s				947 miles@ 27 knots.	
2007	Transatlantic record (Ambrose Light to Ushant)	04d 03h 57m 54s	Superseded			with an average speed of 29.81 knots	
2007-07-20	Superseded - Crewed – 24 hour distance record	794 Nm				during their transatlantic attempt	
2014-01-26	Single Person – 24 hour distance record	682,85 Nm (28.45 knots)			Armel Le Cléac'h		.

== Career ==
=== 2006-2014 Groupama 3 ===
Groupama 3 was launched on 7 June 2006. She was the transatlantic record holder between 2007 and 2009.

During a first attempt for the Jules Verne Trophy (circumnavigation of the world) in 2008, Groupama 3 capsized off the coast of New-Zealand.

She was repaired in France and went for another attempt in 2009. Damage to the port hull led to the attempt being called off after 11 days, and the boat limped into Cape Town for repairs. She then returned to France

Groupama 3 began her third attempt and on 31 January 2010. On 20 March 2010, she became the fastest boat to sail around the world and set a record of 48 days, 7 hours 44 minutes and 52 seconds, improving on Orange II's performance from 2005 by more than 2 days. She lost the record on 7 January 2012, to Banque Populaire V, a larger trimaran.

In 2010, she was retrofitted for single-handed racing to take part of the transatlantic race Route du Rhum. In November 2010, Groupama 3 won the French single-handed transatlantic race Route du Rhum (between Brittany and Guadeloupe), with Frank Cammas at the helm, in 9 days and 14 hours, averaging 16.14 knots.

=== 2014-2014 Groupama 3 ===
She was sponsored by French bank Banque Populaire to take part of 2014 Route du Rhum, which she won with skipper Loïck Peyron. In November 2014, Banque Populaire VII won Route du Rhum again, with Loick Peyron, in 7 days and 15 hours, beating the record by 2 hours and 10 minutes.

=== 2015 – present IDEC Sport ===
In 2015, French yachtsman Francis Joyon's sponsor IDEC announced that they now financed the boat. Under this new sponsorship the boat was leased for six months to Renaud Laplanche, the CEO of Lending Club. The boat was restored from her shortened-mast single-handed configuration to a full crew configuration and named Lending Club 2. Lending Club 2 set a new cross Channel record and a new trans-Pacific record.

In September 2015 the boat's sponsorship changed to the IDEC Sport. The team set a new circumnavigation record in 2017 and won back the Jules Verne Trophy with a time of 40 days 23 hours 30 minutes 30 seconds.

2016 Jules Verne record
Francis Joyon takes possession of the former Groupama 3 on 2 October 2015, after three weeks of work at Multiplast, in Vannes. He chooses an intermediate configuration between the initial power and a reduced rigging for solo races. Closer to the lightness and ergonomics sought alone, less versatile in particular in light winds, Joyon's choices will pay off during his two passages in the southern seas at the end of 2015 then at the end of 2016, with numerous records. With a crew reduced to six people, IDEC Sport presents itself as a challenger to beat the Jules-Verne Trophy, owned by Loïck Peyron since 2011 in 45 days, 13 hours, 42 minutes and 53 seconds.

After an attempt in November 2016, with unfavorable weather in the doldrums and the South Atlantic, and a shock that slightly damaged her fin, Joyon set out again on 16 December 2016 to conquer the trophy. He arrived on 26 January 2017 with a new Around the world sailing record in 40 days 23 h 30 min 30 s. During their 2016 attempt for the Jules-Verne Trophy, Francis Joyon and his crew break numerous intermediate records: four have been formalized and are the subject of records duly certified by the WSSRC.

They make a very fast crossing of the southern seas starting with the Indian Ocean, covering 8091,73 miles in 10 days, maintaining an average of 809 miles per day. This episode began ahead of the front of a depression which moved at a speed corresponding to the boat's potential from South America to the Pacific Ocean. During 12 days, the wind remains port tack, blowing constantly at over 30 knots, an ideal configuration for speed records. Top speeds vary between 38 and 44 knots depending on the state of the sea. Due to bad seas, their speed dropped temporarily (29 knots and 700 miles / 24 h) before a new acceleration, pushing them back above the bar of 800 miles traveled daily.

After passing New Zealand and the Antimeridian, sailing port tack 205 degrees longitude (25 degrees West to Antimeridian) in the southern seas, Francis Joyon and his crew ended up jibing in the transition between two depressions, and manage to catch up with the weather system in front of them over the Pacific Ocean, setting off again at more than 30 knots daily average towards Cape Horn.

Francis Joyon rounds Cape Horn, 16 days after the beginning of this ride off of South America, and after a course of nearly 12,000 miles above 30 knots average (730,16 miles / 24 hours over 16 days). He then signs a performance increase of 30 to 40% compared to Loïck Peyron's record 5 years earlier. Leaving the southern seas with a lead of 4 days 06 hours 35 min over Loïck Peyron's previous record, Francis Joyon and his crew regained the equivalent of 2,800 miles on the record during this episode.

The weather conditions around the world allowed them to optimize the course: 26,412 miles covered on the ground, at an average of 26.85 knots, for a theoretical course of 22,461 miles. Banque Populaire V had to cover almost 2600 more miles in 2015 ( 29,002 miles)

=== Distance records broken during the 2016 campaign ===
While the best day of Loïck Peyron's previous record was the only day above 800 miles from his record (811 miles over 24 hours, or 33.79 knots average), Francis Joyon maintains a speed above 800 daily miles for 10 consecutive days.

It thus improves a large number of progress records by a sailboat over a given period:

Skipper	Reference	start	Distance (miles)	speed (knots)	speed (miles/24 h)
Joyon	best 24h	29 December 2016	894	37,3	894
	best 48 h	28 December 2016	1 748,2	36,42	874,1
	best 72 h	30 December 2016	2 617,7	36,36	872,57
	best 4 days	26 December 2016	3 477,4	36,22	869,35
Joyon	best 5 days	27 December 2016	4 312,57	35,94	862,51
	best 6 days	27 December 2016	5 104,16	35,45	850,7
	best 8 days	26 December 2016	6 525,14	33,99	815,64
	best 10 days	26 December 2016	8 091,73	33,71	809,17
	best 12 days	26 December 2016	9 369,03	32,53	780,75
Joyon	best 16 days	26 December 2016	11 682,62	30,42	730,16

=== Other records broken during the 2016 campaign ===
- Boat record and the second longest distance covered by a sailboat in 24 hours with 894 miles.
- 6 consecutive days at an average of 850.7 miles / 24 h (35.45 knots)
- Ushant - Cape Leeuwin 17 d 06 h 59 min 45 (time of Loïck Peyron during the 2011 record: 17 d 23 h 57 min)
- Ushant - Tasmania 18 d 18 h 31 min (time of Loïck Peyron during the 2011 record: 20 d 07 h 11 min)
- Ushant - Antiméridien 20 d 07 h 01 (time of Loïck Peyron during the 2011 record: 22 d 11 h 34 min)
- Ushant - Cape Horn: 26 d 15 h 45 min (time of Loïck Peyron during the 2011 record: 30 d 22 h 19 min)
- Equator - Cape Leeuwin: 11 d 12 h (time of Loïck Peyron during the 2011 record: 12 d 9 h 2 min)
- Cape Agulhas - Cape Leeuwin in 4 days 9 h 37 min 46 at an average speed of 35.08 knots over ground (3,705 miles) or 842 miles in 24 hours (6 days 8 min or 36% more for Loïck Peyron's previous record)
- Cape of Good Hope - Cape Horn in 13 d 20 h 13 min (19 d 00 h 31 min or 37% more for Loïck Peyron's previous record)
- Cape of Good Hope - Cape Leeuwin: 4 d 11 h 31 min (6 d 02 h 09 min or 36% more for Loïck Peyron's previous record in 2011)
- Cap Leeuwin - Cape Horn in 9 d 08 h 46 min (12 d 22 h 22 min or 38% more for Loïck Peyron's previous record)
- Indian Ocean: 5 d 21 h 7 min 45 s (WSSRC reference) (8 d 07 h 23 min or 41% more for Loïck Peyron during the 2011 record)
- Pacific Ocean: 7 d 21 h 13 min 31 s (WSSRC reference) (10 d 15 h 07 min or 39% more for Loïck Peyron during the 2011 record)
- Equator - Equator: 29 d 9 h 10 min 55 s (WSSRC reference) (32 d 11 h 52 min or 11% more for Loïck Peyron during the 2011 record)
- North Atlantic return record: 5 d 19 h 21 min (7 d 10 h 58 min or 25% more for Loïck Peyron during the 2011 record)

== See also ==
- Circumnavigation
- List of circumnavigations
- List of large sailing yachts

Competitions and prizes

- Global Challenge
- Jules Verne Trophy
- The race
- Oryx Quest
- Vendée Globe

Other speed sailing records

- Speed sailing record
- World Sailing Speed Record Council
- Transatlantic sailing record
- Around the world sailing record

Records
Preceded by Orange II with Bruno Peyron	Jules Verne Trophy; 2010–2012	Succeeded by Banque Populaire V with Loïck Peyron
Preceded by IDEC SPORT with Francis Joyon	Jules Verne Trophy; 2017-current	Succeeded by Incumbent
Preceded by IDEC SPORT with Francis Joyon	Route du Rhum; 2018-current	Succeeded by Incumbent
