= Olivier de Kersauson =

French sailor and sailing champion (born 1944)

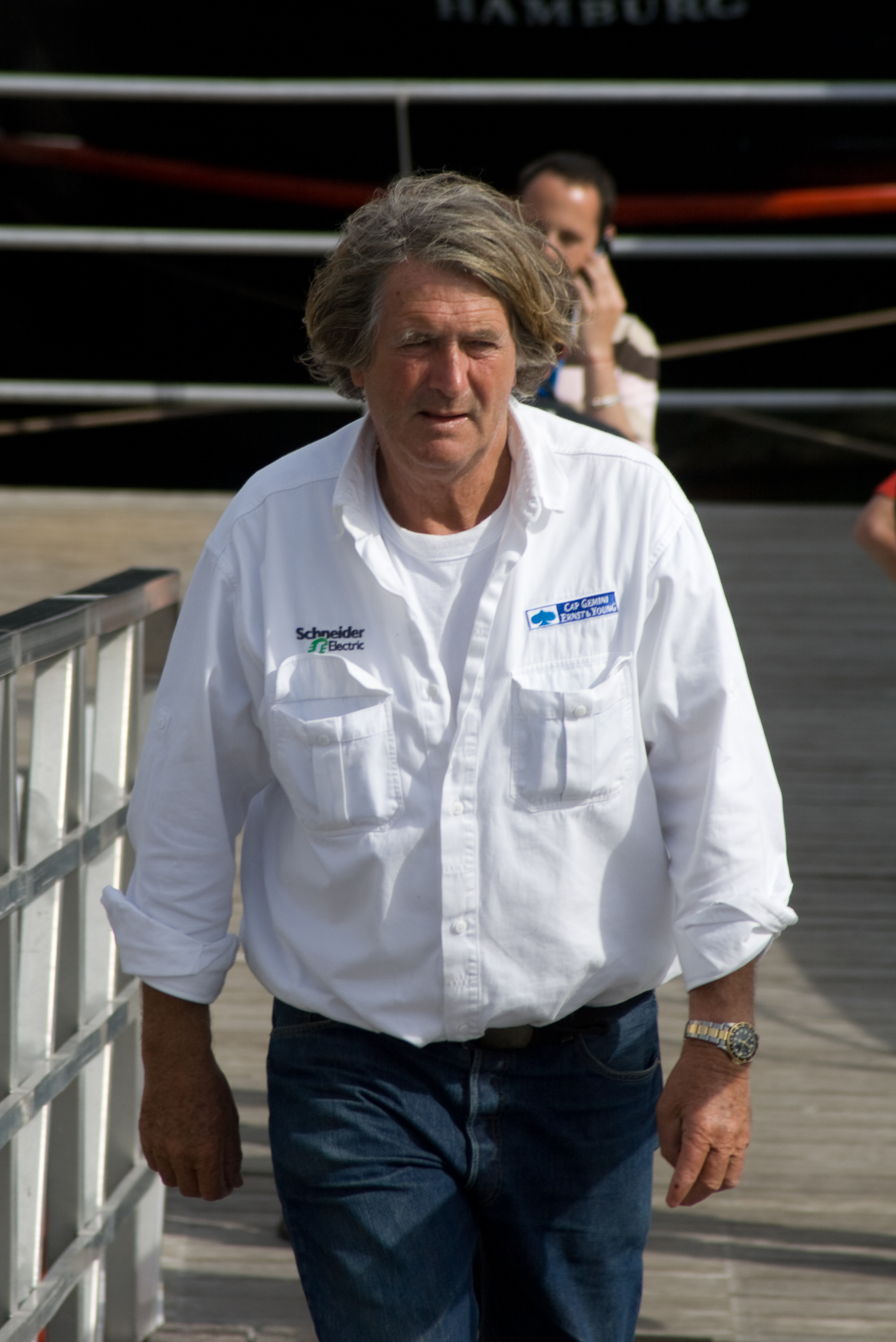
- de Kersauson in 2008

Personal information
- Full name: Olivier de Kersauson de Pennendreff
- Born: 20 July 1944 (age 81) Bonnétable, Sarthe, France

Sailing career
- Sport: Sailing

Olivier de Kersauson de Pennendreff (born 20 July 1944) is a French sailor and sailing champion.

Kersauson was the seventh child in a family of eight. While he was the only Kersauson not to have been born in Brittany, he was born on 20 July 1944 and brought up near Morlaix in a “provincial Catholic aristocracy with compulsory mass” as he calls it. Very early on, Olivier de Kersauson was to break away from his family. Without being inattentive, he was a pupil who did not settle in well to school life with the priests at boarding school. He passed through eleven schools altogether. After his final school exams and getting up to a lot of things, always on the coast, he began studying economics.

At the age of twenty-two, he met Eric Tabarly in Saint Malo. Shortly after, Eric invited him to do his military service on board. This opportunity stretched into eight years during which he was Tabarly’s mate.

In 1973-74, he was a crewmember on the yacht Pen Duick VI in the Whitbread Round the World Yacht Race.

Together, they put on their boots and waterproofs, swallowing up the miles aboard the Pen Duicks. Very quickly, Olivier de Kersauson developed a passion for multihulls in which he became a pioneer. He was, in particular, the first to build a multihull of composite material, Ribourel, then a trimaran with long floaters, Poulain, at the helm of which he set in 1989-1990 the single-handed round the world speed record.

From 1992 onwards, he spent his time working towards the Jules Verne Trophy, the round the world crew record. Wearing the livery of Lyonnaise des Eaux - Dumez, in 1994, he raced around the world against Peter Blake. At the helm of his catamaran Enza, the New Zealander and his six-member crew managed to go around the world in 74 days and 22 hours, while the five Frenchmen took 77 days and five hours. Remaining determined, he made some improvements to his boat and wearing the livery of Sport Elec, took off again around the world. On 8 March 1997, Olivier de Kersauson and his six-man crew left Brest. They were to return triumphant 71 days, 14 hours, 22 minutes and 8 seconds later, improving by more than a week on Peyron’s first time.

In 2001, he named his giant trimaran Geronimo, "because Geronimo never gave up." It was at the helm of this boat that Olivier de Kersauson took the Jules Verne Trophy for the second time in 2004 (63 days, 13 hours, 59 minutes).

In January 2003, Kersauson said that his boat was attacked by a giant squid, "a claim that many regarded as a tall tale" according to The New Yorker. Both him and his first mate Didier Ragot said they saw the squid while it was latched on to their boat.

== Radio ==
- Since 2014 : Les pieds dans le plat on Europe 1

Records
Preceded by ENZA New Zealand with Knox-Johnston & Blake; Orange with Bruno Peyron	Jules Verne Trophy; 1997–2002; 2004–2005	Succeeded by Orange with Bruno Peyron; Orange II with Bruno Peyron
