= Arkéa Ultim Challenge =

Trimaran racing competition

Arkéa Ultim Challenge-Brest is a solo race around the world for giant Ultim class trimarans organised by the Société OC Sport Pen Duick, a subsidiary of the French group Télégramme. The course is identical to that of the Vendée Globe, with the difference that the start is given in Brest. The first edition of the race was held in 2024.

== Rules ==
=== Course ===
The route starts in Brest and then passes round the Cape of Good Hope, Cape Leeuwin and Cape Horn, and ends with a return to Brest with a total distance of about 40,000 km.

=== Duration of the course ===
The fastest competitors were expected to complete the race in around 45 days. The cut off for finishing was set at 100 days after the start.

=== Assistance and technical stopovers ===
For safety reasons and to prevent accidents, technical stopovers are allowed, unlike the Vendée Globe. There is no limit to their number. Technical stopovers have a minimum duration of 24 hours.

In addition, like every race in the Ultimate 32/23 category, shore routing is allowed. Each team has its own routing team.

=== Ghost mode removed ===
The Ghost mode was supposed to allow skippers to hide their position for 24 hours, twice. It was provided for in the Notice of Race published on 6 March 2023, but was subsequently cancelled. In fact, the satellite detection system was required to be in constant operation on board the multihulls to inform commercial vessels that may cross their path.

=== Prize fund ===
The winner of the race was to receive the competition trophy along with €200,000, an amount equal to the entry fee.

== 2024 edition ==
=== Participants ===
For the first edition, 6 competitors were registered, all on trimaran.

Competitor	Boat name	Launch date	Designer	Boat builder
Anthony Marchand	Actual Ultim 3	2015	VPLP Design	Multiplast CDK Technologies
Armel Le Cléac'h	Maxi Banque; Populaire XI	2021	VPLP Design	CDK Technologies
Charles Caudrelier	Maxi Edmond de Rothschild	2017	Guillaume Verdier	Multiplast
Thomas Coville	Sodebo Ultim 3	2019	Sodebo Design	Multiplast
Tom Laperche	SVR-Lazartigue	2021	VPLP Design	Multiplast CDK Technologies
Éric Péron	Adagio	2014	VPLP Design	Multiplast

=== The race ===
==== South Atlantic and Indian Ocean ====
From the 10th day of the race, Charles Caudrelier stayed in front of a depression that was moving at a speed compatible with the boat's potential from the coast of South America to the Kerguelen Islands. He sailed in sparse seas and had 3 days at an average speed of nearly 35 knots (838 miles for his best 24 hours). During this time, he broke several records:

- Equator-Cape of Good Hope route: He set the best intermediate time in all categories (solo and crewed) in 5 days 17 h 20 min
- Indian Ocean (WSSRC): he beat the solo record set by Thomas Coville in 2016 with a time of 8 d 8 h 20 min
- Ushant-Cape Leeuwin route: he beat the previous solo record set by François Gabart in 2017 by more than 24 hours, with a passage time of 18 d 05 h 43 min. He was more than 24 hours ahead of the solo record set by the same François Gabart for the time spent crossing the anti-Meridian, in 22 d 03 h 06 min

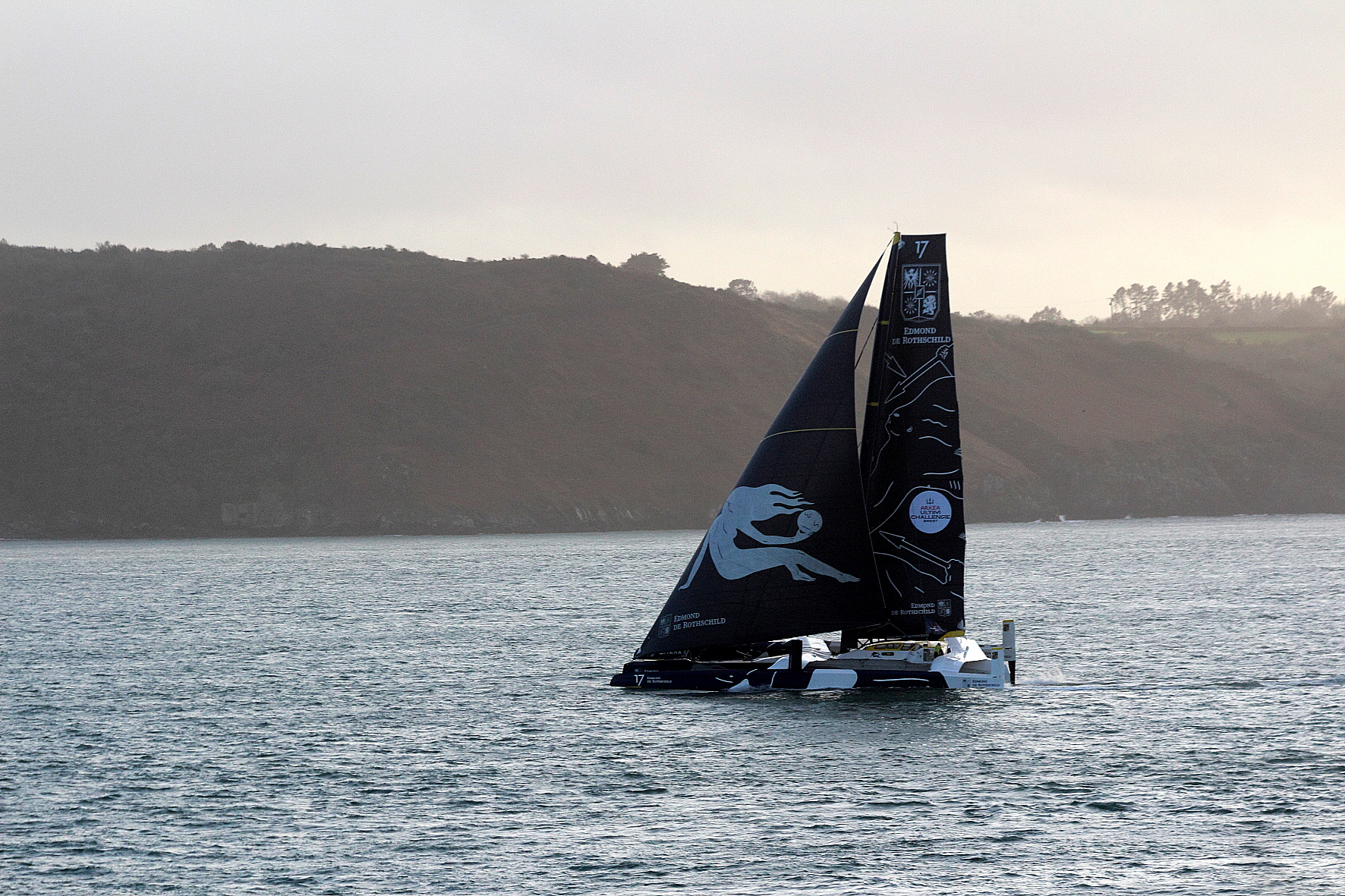
The trimaran Maxi Edmond de Rothschild, skippered by Charles Caudrelier before the start of the race.

Caudrelier rounded Cape Leeuwin on 26 January in a record time of 18 days 5 hours and 44 minutes, more than two days ahead of Thomas Coville, who finished second in the race. Behind him, Armel Le Cleac'h was gradually catching up with Coville and was 301 miles behind the latter when he rounded Cape Leeuwin on 30 January. At the same time, Anthony Marchand and Éric Péron began their crossing of the Indian Ocean, having both set sail from the port of Cape Town.

While sailing along the south of Australia, Armel Le Cleac'h was forced to sail around a depression that took him through the Bass Strait between Tasmania and Australia. However, he took 2nd place in the standings by overtaking Thomas Coville who was stopped at the port of Hobart. In the following days, Le Cleac'h rounded New Zealand to the north, an atypical but necessary route to avoid the depression passing through the south of the country. After passing Point Nemo, Charles Caudrelier was forced to slow down from 2 February, 1,500 miles from Cape Horn, in order to let two strong depressions pass, with winds of 50 to 70 knots. Despite this setback, he maintained a comfortable lead over Le Cleac'h and Coville, who were also under pressure from an unfavourable weather system.

==== Back up the Atlantic ====
Charles Caudrelier was first to round Cape Horn and return to the Atlantic Ocean after 30 days of racing. He was followed by Armel le Cléac'h and Thomas Coville who passed the milestone on the 34th and 35th day of the race respectively.

On his way up the South Atlantic, while sailing downwind along the coast of Argentina in favourable conditions, Le Cleac'h suffered double damage, first to his port rudder and then to the central rudder, making it impossible to continue the race. He decided to make a stopover in Rio de Janeiro, his second of the race, allowing Thomas Coville to regain second place, while Anthony Marchand and Eric Péron continued their crossing of the Pacific. On his return to the race, 48 hours after the start of his stopover, Le Cléac'h was 500 miles behind Coville, who was continuing her course towards the Doldrums.

On the 44th day of the race, while Charles Caudrelier was still in first place with a comfortable lead, he and his team decided to make a technical stop in the Azores in order to let a depression pass through, generating seas with waves 8 to 9 metres high, as he had already done on the approach to Cape Horn. He set sail again after a three-day stopover on 24 February, 1,500 miles ahead of Thomas Coville.

On the 50th day of racing, Charles Caudrelier crossed the finish line in the lead with a comfortable lead despite his stop in the Azores.

==== Notable events ====
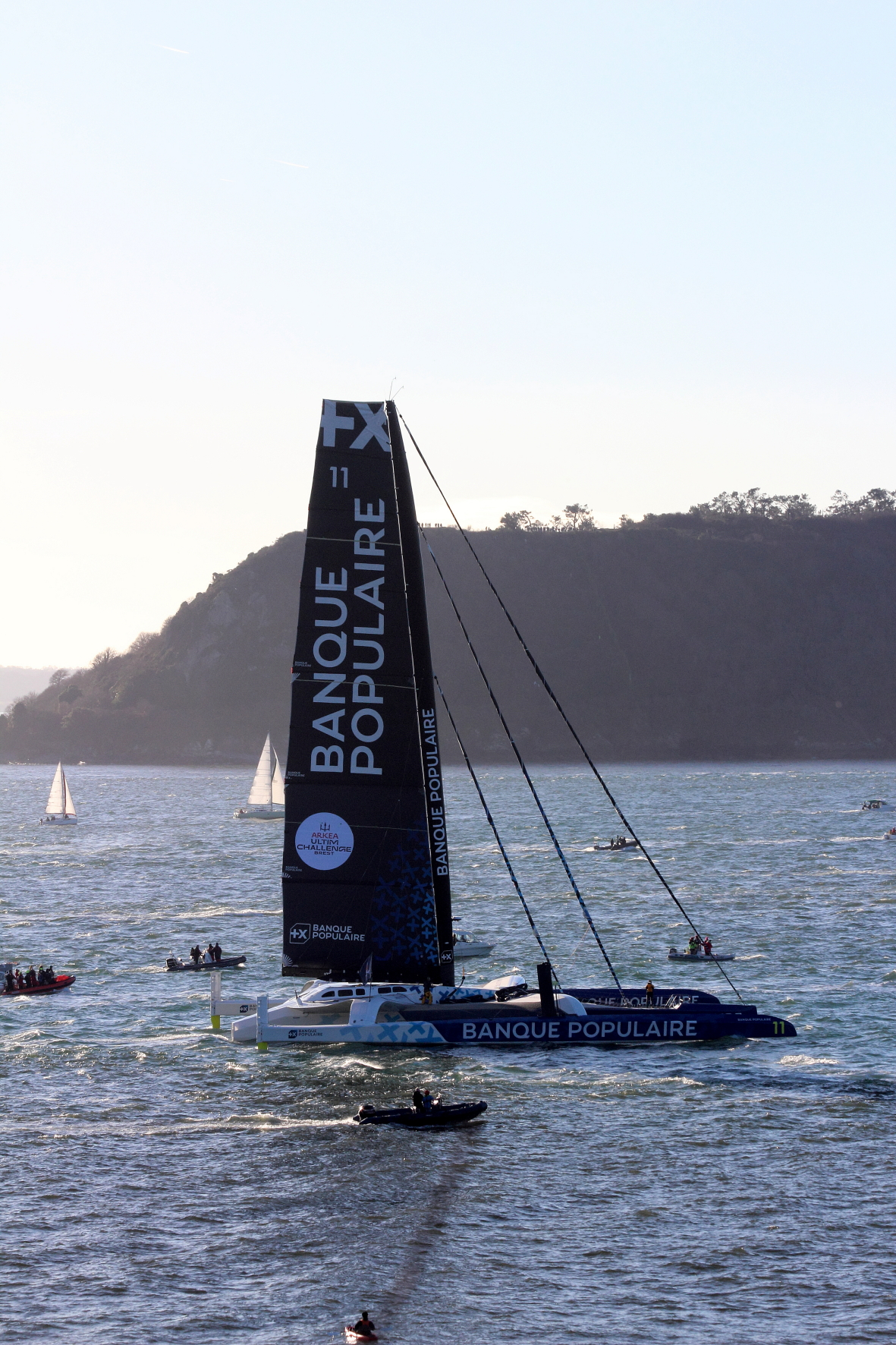
Le trimaran Banque Populaire XI, skippé par Armel Le Cléac'h avant le début de la course.

On 14 January, Armel Le Cléac'h aboard the trimaran Banque Populaire XI was forced to make a stopover in Recife: the boat needed repairs to the foredeck and gennaker tack. He restarted after a 24-hour stop, as stipulated in the race regulations.

On 18 January, the trimaran SVR-Lazartigue, which was in second place on the eleventh day of racing, collided with a UFO about 1,300 miles from Cape Town (South Africa). With a damaged daggerboard well and a water leak, Tom Laperche diverted to Cape Town to assess the damage, and retired on 29 January due to the seriousness of the damage.

On 23 January, Anthony Marchand, on the trimaran Actual Ultim 3, also collided with sea debris, which damaged his port foil. The skipper diverted the next day to Cape Town to remove the foil that was threatening the integrity of the boat. He set sail again on 27 January, 24 hours after arriving in Cape Town, where his team had removed the damaged foil. He continued the race with a boat "not at 100% of its potential but it leaves healthy".

On 26 January, Éric Péron on an Adagio was also the victim of damage off the Cape of Good Hope, with a broken rudder. He diverted to Cape Town, crossing paths with Actual Ultim 3 which was racing again and where SVR-Lazartigue was still on a technical stopover.

Then 2nd in the race, Thomas Coville was also forced to make a stopover in Hobart. He stopped to repair the front balcony and safety net that had torn off. In addition, he took advantage of this stop to repair the foil lowering system. He left again on 2 February after a two-day break to let a strong depression pass.

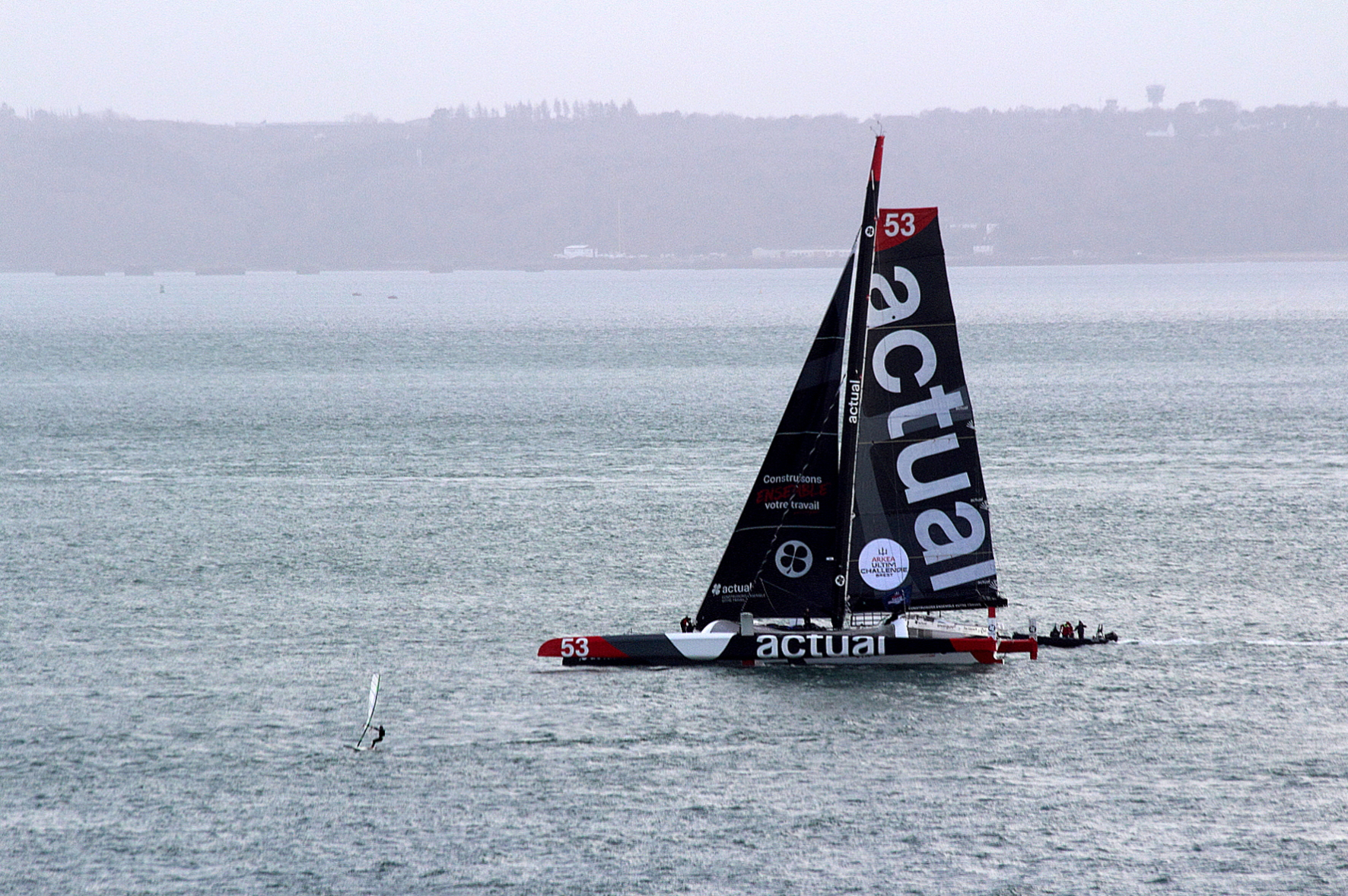
The trimaran Actual Ultim 3, skippered par Anthony Marchand before the start of the race.

On the night of 9 to 10 February, Anthony Marchand stopped for the second time in the race, in Dunedin, New Zealand, having noticed a break in his starboard foil system a few days earlie.r

On 17 February, Armel Le Cleac'h, in 2nd position off the coast of Brazil, was forced to make a second stopover as well, in Rio de Janeiro, after breaking two rudders the day before. Two replacement parts left Brittany on the same day and the skipper and his team hoped to be able to repair them quickly with the aim of keeping 3rd place.

General classification 2024
#	Competitor	Boat	Number of stops	Arrival	Time
1	Charles Caudrelier	Maxi Edmond de Rothschild	1	27 February 2024	50d 19h 7' 42"
2	Thomas Coville	Sodebo Ultim 3	1	29 February 2024	53d 1h 12' 40"
3	Armel Le Cléac'h	Maxi Banque; Populaire XI	2	3 March 2024	56d 8h 1' 31"
4	Anthony Marchand	Actual Ultim 3	2	11 March 2024	64d 1h 36' 21"
5	Éric Péron	Adagio	1	13 March 2024	66d 1h 14' 27"
6	Tom Laperche	SVR-Lazartigue	Abandoned on 29 January in Cape Town (collision with sea debris)		

== 2027–2028 race ==
As soon as the first race finished, Hervé Favre, president of OC Sport-Pen Duick, confirmed a second race by 2027–2028 with the possibility of a "Vintage" category.

== Partners ==
Some of the main sponsors include:

- Arkéa, title partner
- Brest Métropole
- The Brittany region
- The department of Finistère

== See also ==
- Golden Globe Race
- Ultim 32/23
- Vendée Globe
- Jules Verne Trophy
- Transat Café-L'Or
- Route du Rhum
- Day's run
- Around the world sailing record
