= Ultim (trimaran sailboat class) =

Sailing yacht class

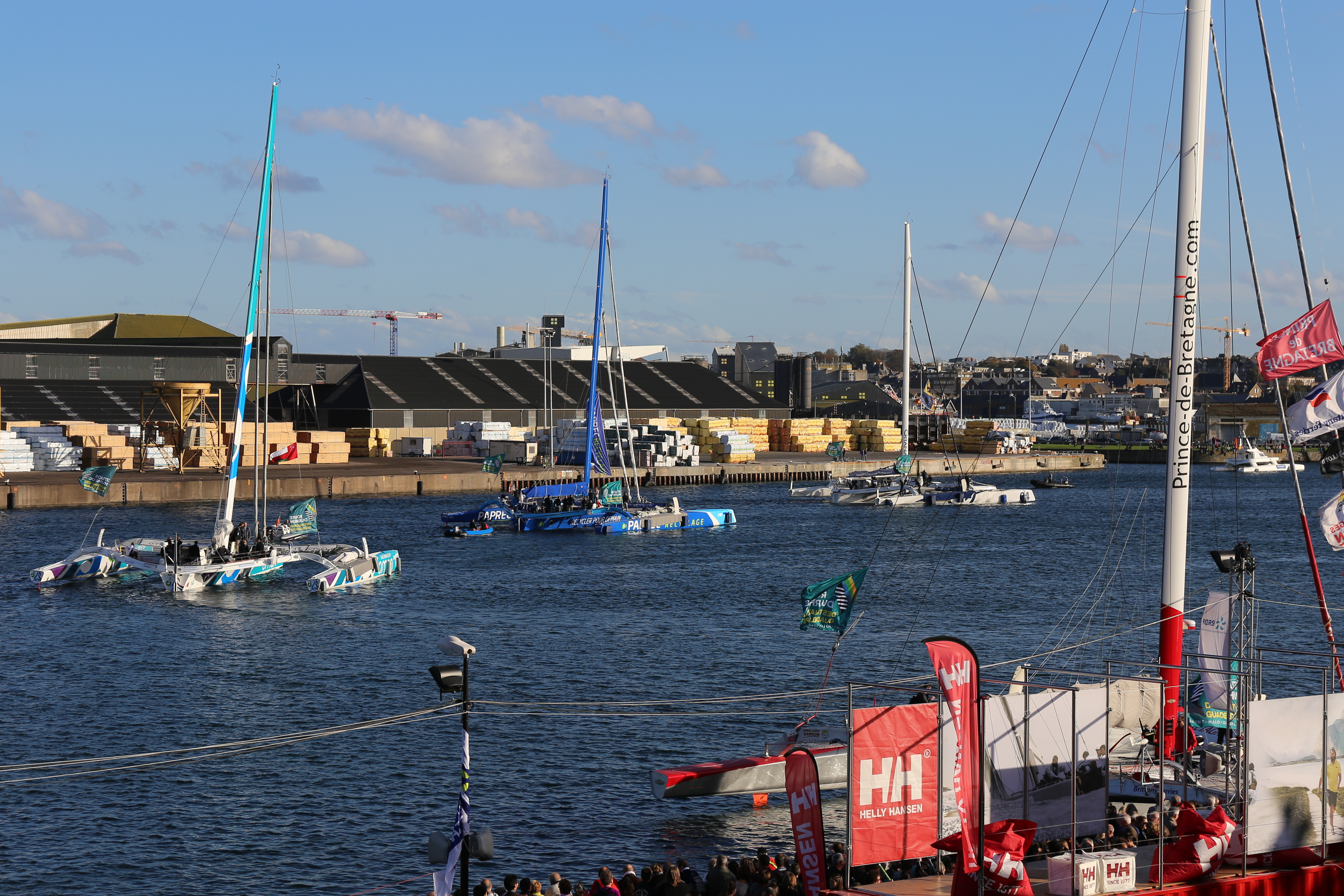

Development
- Designer: various
- Year: 2015

Hull
- LOA: 24 to 32 m
- Beam: max 23 m

The Ultim class (also Classe Ultime or Ultim 32/23) is a class of offshore trimaran sailboats.

== Class rules ==
=== Basic rules ===
The class three major groups of rules:

- irremovable rules:
  - 24 to 32 m in length,
  - 23 m in maximum width,
  - guard at sea greater than or equal to 1.70 m (for vessels launched after the first of January 2015),
  - air draught not exceeding 120% of the largest length of hull found on the vessel;
- rules that can be modified every four years (monitoring committee, group of experts, engine power, anchorages, adjustment of hull mobile appendages, skipper qualification method, etc.);
- rules that can be modified every year, i.e. all those that are not part of the rules that are irremovable or modifiable every four years.

=== Comparable boats outside of the rules ===
- Sails of Change (former Banque Populaire V; now Spindrift 2)
- MOD70

== History ==
On the occasion of the Route du Rhum 2010, the organization of the race decided to group together in a new category all the multihulls of 60 feet and more, with no maximum limit of size. The aim was to succeed the ORMA class of 60-foot trimarans, to wait for the construction of the MOD 70 for the year 2011 and to open the race for large multihulls such as Groupama 3 or IDEC 2.

=== Creation of the Ultime Class ===
In June 2015, an "Ultim Collective" formed around the Team Banque Populaire, Macif and Sodebo teams. They decided that the overall length should be between 23 meters (minimum) and 32 meters (maximum), which excludes the MOD 70 class and Spindrift 2. The MOD 70 class boats, at 21.2-meters LOA, fall short of the class minimum. Spindrift 2, originally Banque Populaire V, at 40 meters LOA, exceeds the maximum permissible LOA for the class.

The Class Ultim 32/23 (maximum length 32 meters / maximum width 23 meters) was approved by the French Sailing Federation on 29 January 2018.

== Boats ==
=== Overview ===
Boat				Skippers		Notes & Sources
Current name	Year	Babtismal name	Former names	Current skipper*	Former skippers**	Notes & Sources
Use It Again (since 2018)	2004	B-Q/Castorama (till 2008)	Oman Sail (2008-2009), La Boîte à Pizza (2009-2011), Région Aquitaine-Port-Médoc (2011-2018)	(France) Romain Pilliard		
IDEC Sport (since 2015)	2006	Groupama 3 (till 2010)	Banque populaire VII (2013-2014), Lending Club 2 (2015)	(France) Alexia Barrier	(France) Francis Joyon	
LIAMM (since 2026)	2014	Sodebo Ultim (till 2019)	Actual Leader (2019-2022), Mieux (2022), Adagio (2023-2024) MACSF (2025-2026)	(France) Guirec Soudée	(France) Arthur Le Vaillant (France) Éric Peron	
Armand Thiery (since 2026)	2015	Macif (till 2019)	Actual Ultim 3 (2019 - 2025)	(France) Louis Burton	(France) Yves Le Blevec (France) Anthony Marchand	
Destroyed	2017	Banque populaire IX		(France) Armel Le Cléac'h		lost at sea during 2018 Route du Rhum
Actual Ultim 4 (since 2025)	2017	Maxi Edmond de Rothschild - Gitana 17		(France) Anthony Marchand	(France) Charles Caudrelier	
Sodebo Ultim 3	2019	Sodebo Ultim 3		(France) Thomas Coville		
SVR-Lazartigue	2021	SVR-Lazartigue		(France) Tom Laperche	(France) François Gabart	
Banque Populaire XI	2021	Banque Populaire XI		(France) Armel Le Cléac'h		
Maxi Edmond de Rothschild - Gitana 18	2025	Maxi Edmond de Rothschild - Gitana 18		(France) Charles Caudrelier		
Banque Populaire 15	2029	Banque Populaire 15		(France) Armel Le Cléac'h		announced
Argo Racing	2029	Argo Racing		(United States) Jason Carroll		announced
*Also: last skipper **Not exhaustive

=== Active Ultimes ===
==== Use It Again ====
- skipper Romain Pilliard (launched in 2004 under the name B-Q/Castorama).

==== IDEC-Sport ====
Originally out of class.

==== LIAMM ====
- skipper Gurec Soudée (launched in 2014 as Sodebo Ultim).
- Builder: Multiplast
- Designer: VPLP Design

==== Maxi Edmond de Rothschild (Gitana 17) ====
- skipper Charles Caudrelier
- Builder: Multiplast
- Designer: Guillaume Verdier

==== Sodebo Ultim' 3 ====
- skipper Thomas Coville
- Builder: Multiplast
- Designer: Sodebo Design

==== SVR-Lazartigue ====
- skipper Francois Gabart
- Builder: CDK Technologie-Multiplast
- Designer: VPLP Design

Originally not considered to be part of the class, among other things due to a fully closed cockpit. After legal action of the team to be included in the class, the boat went through extensive rebuilding to allow the skipper more visibility during manoeuvring on the other hand fully closed cockpits have been allowed since.

==== Banque Populaire XI ====
- skipper Armel Le Cléac'h
- Builder: CDK Technologies
- Designer: VPLP Design

==== Maxi Edmond de Rothschild - Gitana 18 ====
- skipper Charles Caudrelier
- Builder: CDK Technologie-Multiplast
- Designer: Guillaume Verdier and Benjamin Muyl

The Gitana Team has announced a new boat to be launched in 2025. The design team consists of Guillaume Verdier and Benjamin Muyl of the Orient Express Racing Team as well as the Gitana in house design team. CDK Technologies will be main contractor for the build, while Multiplast will be involved as well. Launched on 4th of December 2025.

=== Planned Ultimes ===
==== Banque Populaire 15 ====
- skipper Armel Le Cléac'h
- Builder: CDK Technologies
- Designer: Antoine Koch, Gsea Design, Finot Conq

==== Argo Racing ====
- skipper Jason Carroll
- Builder: Multiplast
- Designer: VPLP Design

=== Past Ultimes ===
==== Banque populaire IX ====
- skipper Armel Le Cléac'h.

Lost at sea during 2018 Route du Rhum.

== Competitions ==
=== Route du Rhum ===
The class has been part of the Route du Rhum since 2010.

=== Transat Jacques Vabre ===
The class has been part of the Transat Jacques Vabre since 2015 (with the exception of 2019).

=== Rolex Fastnet Race ===
The class has been part of the Rolex Fastnet Race since 2019.

=== Arkéa Ultim Challenge - Brest ===
In January 2023, the start of the first solo tour of the Ultimes, the "Arkéa Ultim Challenge - Brest", was announced for 7 January 2024, with six participants. The maxi-trimarans will perform the round the world from west to east by the three capes (Good Hope, Leeuwin and Horn), about a distance of 21,760 miles from Brest to Brest. The organization of this race was entrusted to OC Sport Pen Duick.

Participants:
Skipper	Boat				Result		Ref.
Skipper	Name	Sail Nr.	Designer	Builder	Pos.	Time	Ref.
Charles Caudrelier (FRA)	Maxi Edmond de Rothschild	FRA 17	Guillaume Verdier	Multiplast	1	50d 19h 7m 42s	
Thomas Coville (FRA)	Sodebo Ultim 3	FRA 73	Sodebo Design	Multiplast	2	53d 1h 12m 40s	
Armel Le Cléac'h (FRA)	Maxi Banque Populaire XI	FRA 11	VPLP Design	CDK Technologies	3	56d 8h 1m 31s	
Anthony Marchand (FRA)	Actual Ultim 3	FRA 53	VPLP Design	CDK Technologie-Multiplast	4	64d 1hr 38m 21s	
Éric Péron (FRA)	Adagio	-	VPLP Design	Multiplast	5	66d 1h 14m 27s	
Tom Laperche (FRA)	SVR Lazartigue	-	VPLP Design	Multiplast CDK Technologies	DNF		

== Notable performance ==
In its Jules Verne Trophy record in 2009-2010, the Trimaran Groupama 3 in the hands of Franck Cammas travelled 798 nautical miles in 24 hours on February 13, 2010 featuring 17 days at more than 600 miles, including 10 days at more than 700 miles.

In its Jules Verne trophy record in 2016-2017, the Idec Sports trimaran in the hands of Francis Joyon travelled 894 nautical miles in 24 hours, with 10 consecutive days at 809 miles/24 h. Francis Joyon doubled Cape Horn, 16 days after hooking the first depression off South America, and after a trajectory of nearly 12,000 miles above an average of 30 knots (730.16 hours a day over 16 days). He then showed an increase in performance between 30 and 40% compared to the peak of Louck Peyron's record five years earlier. Leaving the Southern Seas with a 4-day 6-hour 35-minute lead on the previous record of Louck Peyron, Francis Joyon and his crew regained the equivalent of 2,800 miles at the record for this episode.

During the return after his victory at the Transat Jacques-Vabre 2021, Charles Caudrelier broke two unofficial records on the Maxi Edmond de Rothschild: in training in false-solo, he made a point at 50.7 knots, and traveled 880 miles in 24 hours at the average speed of 36.6 knots. The latter record may not be certified for lack of adequate equipment on board.

During his attempt for the Jules Verne Trophy on December 5, 2020, Thomas Coville on Sodebo Ultim 3 covered 889.9 miles in 24 hours (37.1 knots average, top speed 48.9 knots).

During his attempt for the Jules Verne Trophy on December 21, 2024, François Gabart on SVR-Lazartigue covered 892.2 miles in 24 hours (37.2 knots average, top speed over 50 knots).

== See also ==
- Ocean Racing Multihull Association (ORMA)
- Multi One Design 70 (MOD 70)
- IMOCA 60
