= 2018 Route du Rhum =

Transtlantic single person sailing race

Event title
- Name: 2018 Route du Rhum
- Edition: 11th Edition
- Sponsor: Destination Guadeloupe
- Host: OC Sport Pen Duick

Event details
- Start location: St Malo (FRA)
- Finish location: Guadeloupe
- Course: Solo Non-Stop Transatlantic Race
- Dates: Starts 4nd November 2018
- Yachts: 123 Boats

Competitors
- Competitors: 123 Sailors
- Competing nations: BEL 2, FIN 1, FRA 102, GBR 7, GER 2, ITA 2, JPN 1, RSA 1, SUI 2, SWE 1, USA 2

Results
- Line honours: IDEC SPORT; Francis Joyon (FRA)

Classes
- Class 1: Ultime
- Class 2: Multi 50
- Class 3: IMOCA 60
- Class 4: Class40
- Class 5: Rhum Multihull
- Class 6: Rhum Monohull

The Route du Rhum is a single person transatlantic race the 2018 race was the 11th edition and had six classes with 123 boats taking part.

== Results ==
=== Ultime ===
Pos	Sail No.	Boat name	Year	Name / Nationality	Finish Time	Elapsed Time	Delta %	Speed	Distance Sailed	Ref.
1		IDEC SPORT	2006	Francis Joyon (FRA)	2018-11-12 - 04:21:47	07d 14h 21m 47s	0	19.42	0	
2		MACIF	2015	François Gabart (FRA)	2018-11-12 - 04:28:55	07d 14h 28m 55s	0.07	19.41	0	
3		SODEBO ULTIM'	2014	Thomas Coville (FRA)	2018-11-20 - 21:45:36	16d 07h 45m 36s	114.82	9.04	0	
4		REMADE - USE IT AGAIN !	2004	Romain Pilliard (FRA)	2018-11-26 - 09:08:25	21d 19h 33m 25s	187.1	6.77	0	
RET		Banque Populaire IX	2017	Armel Le Cléac'h (FRA)	3 Nov Damage					
RET		MAXI EDMOND DE ROTHSCHILD	2017	Sébastien Josse (FRA)	2 Nov Medical Reason					

=== IMOCA 60 ===
Pos.	Boat name	Yr. Launch	Name	Finish Time	Elapsed Time	Note	Ref.
1	SMA	2011	Paul Meilhat (FRA)	.17/11/2018 - .01:23:18	12d 11h 23m 18s	11.83	
2	Ucar - Saint Michel	2015	Yann Eliès (FRA)	.17/11/2018 - .03:38:30	12d 13h 38m 30s	11.74	
3	Hugo Boss (6)	2015	Alex Thomson (GBR)	.16/11/2018 - .13:10:58	Corrected Time; 12d 23h 10m 58s	12.33	
4	PRB (4)	2010	Vincent Riou (FRA)	.17/11/2018 - .14:21:08	13d 00h 21m 08s	11.34	
5	Malizia 2 - Yacht Club De Monaco	2015	Boris Herrmann (GER)	.17/11/2018 - .17:47:30	13d 03h 47m 30s	11.22	
6	Groupe Apicil	2008	Damien Seguin (FRA)	.19/11/2018 - .08:55:02	14d 18h 55m 02s	9.98	
7	La Fabrique (2)	2007	Alan Roura (SUI)	.19/11/2018 - .16:25:37	15d 02h 25m 37s	9.77	
8	Time For Ocean	2007	Stéphane Le Diraison (FRA)	.19/11/2018 - .16:30:20	15d 02h 30m 20s	9.77	
9	La Mie Caline Artipole	2007	Arnaud Boissières (FRA)	.21/11/2018 - .02:08:42	16d 12h 08m 42s	8.94	
10	Vers Un Monde Sans Sida	2006	Erik Nigon (FRA)	.21/11/2018 - .21:34:30	17d 07h 34m 30s	8.52	
11	Ariel 2	2007	Ari Huusela (FIN)	.24/11/2018 - .03:31:05	19d 13h 31m 05s	7.54	
12	Newrest - Art Et Fenetres	2015	Fabrice Amedeo (FRA)	.25/11/2018 - .10:09:42	20d 20h 09m 42s	7.08	
13	Pure - Famille Mary	2007	Romain Attanasio (FRA)	.27/11/2018 - .19:56:30	23d 07h 06m 30s	6.35	
14	Groupe Setin	2007	Manuel Cousin (FRA)	.30/11/2018 - .12:38:00	25d 22h 38m 00s	5.69	
15	4Myplanet	2007	Alexia Barrier (FRA)	.01/12/2018 - .16:20:54	27d 02h 20m 54s	5.45	
ABD	Maitre Coq (PRB3)	2006	Yannick Bestaven (FRA)	Retired unaided to Lisbon with the keel hydraulics issues			
ABD	Initiatives - Coeur (3)	2010	Sam Davies (GBR)	Retired unaided to Lorient with hull delamination			
ABD	Bureau Vallee 2	2015	Louis Burton (FRA)	Retired to Saint-Malo ingress of water via the foil housing			
ABD	Charal	2018	Jérémie Beyou (FRA)	Retired towed back by team to Lorient with steering failure			
ABD	Monin	2007	Isabelle Joschke (FRA)	Retired - Mast Breakage			

=== Class 40 ===
Pos.	Sail No.	Boat name	Design	Yr. Launch	Name	Finish Time	Elapsed Time	Delta	Rhum Speed	Ref.
1	FRA 154	Veedol - AIC	Lombard	2018	Yoann Richomme (FRA)	20-11-2018 - 17:22:44	16d 03h 22m 44s	0%	9.14	
2	FRA 151	AINA Enfance et avenir	Mach 40.3	2017	Aymeric Chappellier (FRA)	21-11-2018 - 01:16:15	16d 11h 16m 15s	2.04%	8.96	
3	GBR 130	Imerys Clean Energy	Mach 40	2013	Phil Sharp (GBR)	21-11-2018 - 03:01:50	16d 13h 01m 50s	2.49%	8.92	
4	FRA 156	Leyton	Mach 40.3	2018	Arthur Le Vaillant (FRA)	21-11-2018 - 17:55:07	17d 03h 55m 07s	6.33%	8.6	
5	FRA 142	Made in Midi	Tiz'h 40	2014	Kito de Pavant (FRA)	21-11-2018 - 18:49:47	17d 04h 49m 47s	6.57%	8.58	
6	GBR 153	Lamotte - Module Création	Mach 40.3	2018	Luke Berry (GBR)	21-11-2018 - 20:51:30	17d 06h 51m 30s	7.09%	8.54	
7	FRA 148	Custo Pol	Tiz'h 40	2016	Antoine Carpentier (FRA)	22-11-2018 - 14:56:36	18d 00h 56m 36s	11.76%	8.18	
8	GBR 129	Concise 8	McConaghy Ker40	2013	Jack Trigger (GBR)	22-11-2018 - 20:18:02	18d 06h 18m 02s	13.15%	8.08	
9	FRA 135	Région Normandie - LMAX Exchange	Pogo 40S3	2014	Olivier Cardin (FRA)	23-11-2018 - 17:49:23	19d 03h 49m 23s	18.7%	7.7	
10	FRA 109	Chocolats Paries - Coriolis Composites	Pogo 40S2	2011	Jean-Baptiste Daramy (FRA)	24-11-2018 - 18:06:20	20d 04h 06m 20s	24.97%	7.32	
11	FRA 123	Tibco	Botin	2013	Loic Fequet (FRA)	25-11-2018 - 12:18:50	20d 22h 18m 50s	29.67%	7.05	
12	USA 54	Dragon	Custom Owen Clarke	0	Michael Hennessy (USA)	25-11-2018 - 17:03:46	21d 04h 03m 46s	31.15%	6.97	
13	GBR 147	Campagne de France	Mabire-Nivelt	2016	Miranda Merron (GBR)	25-11-2018 - 22:10:32	21d 08h 10m 32s	32.22%	6.92	
14	FRA 104	Volvo	Manuard	2011	Jonas Gerkens (FRA)	25-11-2018 - 23:55:15	21d 09h 55m 15s	32.67%	6.89	
15	FRA 152	AUDI SAINT MALO - Espoir pour un Rhum	Tiz'h 40	2018	Arthur Hubert (FRA)	25-11-2018 - 23:56:56	21d 09h 56m 56s	32.67%	6.89	
16	FRA 113	Beijaflore	Pogo 40S2	2011	William Mathelin Moreaux (FRA)	26-11-2018 - 06:52:23	21d 18h 52m 23s	34.98%	6.77	
17	GER 138	Iskareen	Pogo 40S3	2014	Arnt Bruhns (GER)	26-11-2018 - 10:03:07	21d 21h 03m 07s	35.54%	6.75	
18	FRA 107	Ma Chance, moi aussi	Kiwi 40FC	2011	Robin Marais (FRA)	26-11-2018 - 17:21:17	22d 03h 21m 17s	37.17%	6.67	
19	FRA 150	Carac	Lombard	2017	Louis Duc (FRA)	26-11-2018 - 20:02:32	22d 06h 02m 32s	37.86%	6.63	
20	FRA 79	Rêve de Large	Owen C	2009	Rodolphe Sepho (FRA)	27-11-2018 - 00:23:40	22d 11h 23m 40s	39.24%	6.57	
21	SWE 95	Talanta	Pogo 40S2	2010	Mikael Ryking (SWE)	27-11-2018 - 06:38:44	22d 17h 38m 44s	40.86%	6.49	
22	FRA 65	Yoda	Akilaria Mk2 (Proto)	2008	Franz Bouvet (FRA)	27-11-2018 - 21:50:40	23d 07h 50m 40s	44.52%	6.33	
23	RSA 111	Power of One	Akilaria	2011	Donald Alexander (RSA)	30-11-2018 - 14:19:14	26d 01h 19m 14s	61.42%	5.66	
24	FRA 133	TERANGA	Pogo 40S3	2013	Emmanuel Hamez (FRA)	30-11-2018 - 20:22:14	26d 07h 22m 14s	62.99%	5.61	
25	FRA 43	E. Leclerc - Ville La Grand	Akilaria RC1	2007	Olivier Magre (FRA)	01-12-2018 - 10:15:44	26d 20h 15m 44s	66.31%	5.5	
26	FRA 99	Pèp Gwadloup'	Akilaria	2010	Carl Chipotel (FRA)	01-12-2018 - 10:18:03	26d 20h 18m 03s	66.32%	5.5	
27	FRA 30	Fleury Michon Bio	CMI / Rogers	2007	Morgane Ursault-Poupon (FRA)	01-12-2018 - 15:27:06	27d 01h 27m 06s	67.65%	5.45	
28	FRA 81	Esprit scout	Akilaria RC2	2009	Marc Dubos (FRA)	01-12-2018 - 20:40:50	27d 06h 40m 50s	69%	5.41	
29	FRA 61	Grizzly Barber Shop	Philippot	2007	Cedric De Kervenoal (FRA)	01-12-2018 - 20:50:38	27d 06h 50m 38s	69.04%	5.41	
30	ITA 55	Enel Green Power	Verdier	2007	Andrea Fantini (ITA)	02-12-2018 - 12:40:28	27d 22h 40m 28s	73.13%	5.28	
31	FRA 124	Obportus IV Gras Savoye	Akilaria RC 3	2012	Olivier Roussey (FRA)	01-12-2018 - 23:58:56	28d 09h 58m 56s	76.05%	5.19	
32	FRA 103	Klaxoon	Canivenc	0	Jean Marie Loirat (FRA)	03-12-2018 - 19:11:27	29d 05h 11m 27s	81.01%	5.05	
33	SUI 31	Destination Evian	LC40	2007	Jacques Valente (SUI)	05-12-2018 - 06:01:25	30d 16h 01m 25s	90%	4.81	
34	JPN 146	Kiho	Pogo 40S3	2015	Hiroshi Kitada (JPN)	06-12-2018 - 01:36:52	31d 11h 36m 52s	95.06%	4.69	
TLE	FRA 1	Saint Cast le Guildo Terre Exotique	Jumbo	2004	Loic Le Doyen (FRA)	Time Limit Exceeded				
RET	FRA 42	Bijouteries Lassort - Tonton Louis	Akilaria RC1	2006	François Lassort (FRA)					
RET	FRA 100	Edenred	Pogo 40S2	2010	Emmanuel Le Roch (FRA)					
RET	USA 132	Loose Fish	Akilaria RC 3	2013	John Niewenhous (USA)					
RET	FRA 131	Fondation Digestscience	Akilaria RC 3	2013	Romain Rossi (FRA)	18 Nov. -				
RET	FRA 140	Equipe voile Parkinson	Sabrosa 40 Mk2	2014	Florian Gueguen (FRA)	18 Nov. -				
RET	FRA 83	Service civique	Akilaria	2009	Claire Pruvot (FRA)	16 Nov. - Electrical Problems				
RET	FRA 134	Manorga	Mach 40	2014	Nicolas Jossier (FRA)	15 Nov - Technical Problems				
RET	FRA 101	COLOMBRE XL (Sponsor wanted)	Pogo 40S2	2011	Halvard Mabire (FRA)	15 Nov - Technical Problems				
RET	FRA 89	#Marie-Galante - April	Akilaria	2010	Dominique Rivard (FRA)	14 Nov - Technical Problems				
RET	FRA 98	Azeo - #on est large	Tyker 40 Evolution 2	2010	Maxime Cauwe (FRA)	14 Nov -				
RET	FRA 144	V and B	Mach 40.3	2015	Maxime Sorel (FRA)	12 Nov - Dismasted				
RET	FRA 125	Serenis Consulting	Custom Humphreys	2013	Jean Galfione (FRA)	12 Nov - (Unaided to Brest)				
RET	FRA 115	bertrand.delesne.fr	Mach 40	2012	Bertrand Delesne (FRA)	11 Nov. - Damage furler broken (Unaided to Lorient)				
RET	FRA 60	Kersia/Le Guevel/Spirit of Saint-Malo	JPK40	2007	Sebastien Desquesses (FRA)	11 Nov. -				
RET	FRA 91	Up - Sail & Connect	JPK 40	2009	Arthur Gascoin (FRA)	11 Nov. - (in Bénodet)				
RET	FRA 155	Corum	Mach 40.3	2018	Nicolas Troussel (FRA)	10 Nov. - Damage: injured hand, no wind instruments and engine mounting (in Lisbon)				
RET	FRA 139	Campings Tohapi	Sabrosa 40	2014	Sébastien Marsset (FRA)	10 Nov. - Damage: outriggers, bowsprit and structural problems (in Lorient)				
RET	GBR 137	Narcos : Mexico	Mach 40	2014	Sam Goodchild (GBR)	10 Nov. - Dismasted (Sailed Unaided to Lorient)				

=== Multi 50 ===
Pos	Sail No.	Boat name	Year	Name / Nationality		Finish Time	Elapsed Time	Delta %	Speed	Distance Sailed	Ref.
1	7	REAUTE CHOCOLAT	2009	Armel Tripon (FRA)	m	2018-11-15 - 21:32:40	11d 07h 32m 40s	0%	13.04 / 0	0	
2	3	FENETREA-MIX BUFFET	2009	Erwan Le Roux (FRA)	m	2018-11-16 - 15:09:12	12d 01h 09m 12s	6.48%	12.25 / 0	0	
3	100 000	Solidaires en Peloton ARSEP	2017	Thibaut Vauchel-Camus (FRA)	m	2018-11-16 - 23:18:44	12d 10h 08m 44s	9.8%	11.88 / 0	0	
4	35	LA FRENCH TECH RENNES SAINT MALO	2009	Gilles Lamire (FRA)	m	2018-11-18 - 08:34:38	13d 18h 34m 38s	21.74%	10.71 / 0	0	
5	83	CIELA VILLAGE	2017	Thierry BOUCHARD (FRA)	m	2018-11-22 - 20:06:08	18d 06h 06m 08s	61.34%	8.08 / 0	0	
ABD	9	ARKEMA	2013	Lalou Roucayrol (FRA)	m	Retiredd 0h 0m 0s	0%	0 / 0	0		

=== Rhum Multi ===
Pos	Sail No.	Boat name	Year	Name / Nationality		Finish Time	Elapsed Time	Delta %	Speed	Distance Sailed	Ref.
1		Olmix	1991	Pierre Antoine (FRA)	m	2018-11-20 - 11:15:05	15d 01h 15m 05s	0%	9.8 / 0	0	
2		Ecole Diagonale Pour Citoyens Du Monde		Jean-Francois Lilti (FRA)	m	2018-11-22 - 21:47:45	18d 08h 32m 45s	21.95%	8.04 / 0	0	
3	55	Pir2	1982	Etienne Hochede (FRA)	m	2018-11-23 - 14:18:06	19d 01h 48m 06s	26.73%	7.74 / 0	0	
4		Happy		Loïck Peyron (FRA)	m	2018-11-25 - 17:57:17	21d 03h 57m 17s	40.61%	6.97 / 0	0	
5		Solveo Energies Nouvelles		Jean-Pierre Balmes (FRA)	m	2018-11-25 - 20:31:53	21d 06h 31m 53s	41.32%	6.94 / 0	0	
6		Friends & Lovers	1981 Greene	François Corre (FRA)	m	2018-11-25 - 22:01:35	21d 08h 01m 35s	41.74%	6.92 / 0	0	
7		Rayon Vert		Alain Delhumeau (FRA)	m	2018-11-26 - 06:08:20	21d 16h 08m 20s	43.98%	6.81 / 0	0	
8		Resadia		Pierrick Tollemer (FRA)	m	2018-12-02 - 14:15:22	28d 00h 15m 22s	86.09%	5.27 / 0	0	
9		Liladhoc		Eric Gamin (FRA)	m	2018-12-03 - 10:50:48	28d 20h 50m 48s	91.79%	5.11 / 0	0	
10		Cre Actuel		Bertrand de Broc (FRA)	m	2018-12-03 - 12:34:43	29d 00h 04m 43s	92.69%	5.09 / 0	0	
11		Guyader Gastronomie		Christian Guyader (FRA)	m	2018-12-03 - 19:23:08	29d 05h 23m 08s	94.15%	5.05 / 0	0	
12		Zed7		Gérald Bibot (BEL)	m	2018-12-06 - 02:14:34	31d 12h 14m 34s	109.34%	4.68 / 0	0	
ABD		No Limit - Bmp		Yann Marilley (FRA)	m	0d 0h 0m 0s	0%	0 / 0	0		
ABD		Team Vent Debout		Fabrice Payen (FRA)	m	0d 0h 0m 0s	0%	0 / 0	0		
ABD	FRA 38	Branec IV	1990	Franck Sainte Marie (FRA)	m	0d 0h 0m 0s	0%	0 / 0	0		
ABD		Acapella - Soreal - Proludic		Charlie Capelle (FRA)	m	0d 0h 0m 0s	0%	0 / 0	0		
ABD	BEL 1	Jess	2012	Gilles Buekenhout (BEL)	m	0d 0h 0m 0s	0%	0 / 0	0		
ABD		Bo Carre		Gildas Breton (FRA)	m	0d 0h 0m 0s	0%	0 / 0	0		
ABD		Sterec Aile Bleue		Christophe Bogrand (FRA)	m	0d 0h 0m 0s	0%	0 / 0	0		
ABD		Gold.Fr Pour Bioniria		Erwan Thiboumery (FRA)	m	0d 0h 0m 0s	0%	0 / 0	0		
ABD		Air Antilles - Caseneuve Maxi Catamaran		David Ducosson (FRA)	m	0d 0h 0m 0s	0%	0 / 0	0		

=== Rhum Mono ===
Pos	Sail No.	Boat name	Year		Name / Nationality	Finish Time	Elapsed Time	Delta %	Speed	Distance Sailed	Ref.
1	FRA 01	CAFE JOYEUX	Open 50	2007	Sidney Gavignet (FRA)	2018-11-21 - 00:18:05	16d 11h 18m 05s	0%	8.96 / 11.98	4736	
2		ALCATRAZIT - FACEOCEAN	IMOCA 60	1998	Sébastien Destremau (FRA)	2018-11-21 - 21:25:44	17d 07h 25m 44s	5.09%	8.53 / 0	0	
3	97	ROTARY / LA MER POUR TOUS	Ketch		Luc Coquelin (FRA)	2018-11-26 - 22:24:12	22d 08h 24m 12s	35.69%	6.6 / 8.4	4506	
4		FORMATIVES NETWORK	IMOCA 60	1991	Jean-Marie Patier (FRA)	2018-11-27 - 06:05:15	22d 19h 05m 15s	38.4%	6.47 / 0	0	
5		CAP AU CAP LOCATION - SOS VILLAGES D'ENFANTS	22.95m Racing Monohull	1983	Wilfrid Clerton (FRA)	2018-11-27 - 21:30:50	23d 08h 30m 50s	41.79%	6.32 / 0	0	
6		LE CHOIX FUNERAIRE			Nils Boyer (FRA)	2018-12-02 - 02:47:05	27d 13h 47m 05s	67.41%	5.35 / 0	0	
7		GHEO			Dominique Dubois (FRA)	2018-12-04 - 17:28:30	30d 03h 28m 30s	83.02%	4.9 / 0	0	
8		SOS PARE-BRISE			Nicolas Magnan (FRA)	2018-12-05 - 02:12:30	30d 13h 12m 30s	85.48%	4.83 / 0	0	
9		RHUM SOLIDAIRE CAP HANDI			Christophe Souchaud (FRA)	2018-12-06 - 22:40:45	32d 08h 40m 45s	96.48%	4.56 / 0	0	
10		COMMEUNSEULHOMME			Éric Bellion (FRA)	0d 0h 0m 0s	0%	0 / 0	0		
ABD		LA VOIX DE L'OCEAN			Eric Jail (FRA)						
ABD		L'ESPACE DU SOUFFLE			Laurent Jubert (FRA)						
ABD		ART IMMOBILIER CONSTRUCTION			Olivier Leroux (FRA)						
ABD		VENTO DI SARDEGNA			Andrea Mura (ITA)						
ABD		TRANSPORTS GROUSSARD			Jean-Luc Bizien-Jaglin (FRA)						
ABD		C' LA GUADELOUPE			Willy Bissainte (FRA)						
ABD		KRITER V SOCOMORE	21m Racing Monohull	1978	Bob Escoffier (FRA)						
