= Vendée Globe =

Yacht race

Coordinates: 46.4951°N 1.7886°W

- Most recent edition or competition: 2024–2025 Vendée Globe
- First held: 1989; 37 years ago
- Type: Single-handed non-stop round-the-world race
- Classes: IMOCA 60
- Start: Les Sables-d'Olonne
- Finish: Les Sables-d'Olonne
- Length: 24,000 nmi (44,000 km)
- Most titles: Michel Desjoyeaux (2)
- Website: www.vendeeglobe.org

The Vendée Globe (French: [vɑ̃de glɔb]) is a single-handed (solo) non-stop, unassisted round the world yacht race. The race was founded by Philippe Jeantot in 1989, and since 1992 has taken place every four years. It is named after the department of Vendée, in France, where the race starts and ends. The Vendée Globe is considered an extreme quest of individual endurance and the ultimate test in ocean racing.

== The race ==
=== History ===
The race was founded as "The Globe Challenge" in 1989 by French yachtsman Philippe Jeantot. Jeantot had competed in the BOC Challenge in 1982–83 and 1986–87, winning the 60-foot class ("Class I") both times. The BOC Challenge was sailed in stages with sailors being given the chance to rest and repair their boats at ports around the world.Unsatisfied with the race's format, he decided to set up a new round-the-world non-stop race, which he felt would be the ultimate challenge for single-handed sailors.

The first race was run in 1989–90, and was won by Titouan Lamazou; Jeantot himself took part, and placed fourth. The next race was in 1992–93; and it has since then been run every four years. The inaugural race included 11 Frenchmen, one South African (Bertie Reed) and one American (Mike Plant).

=== Yachts ===
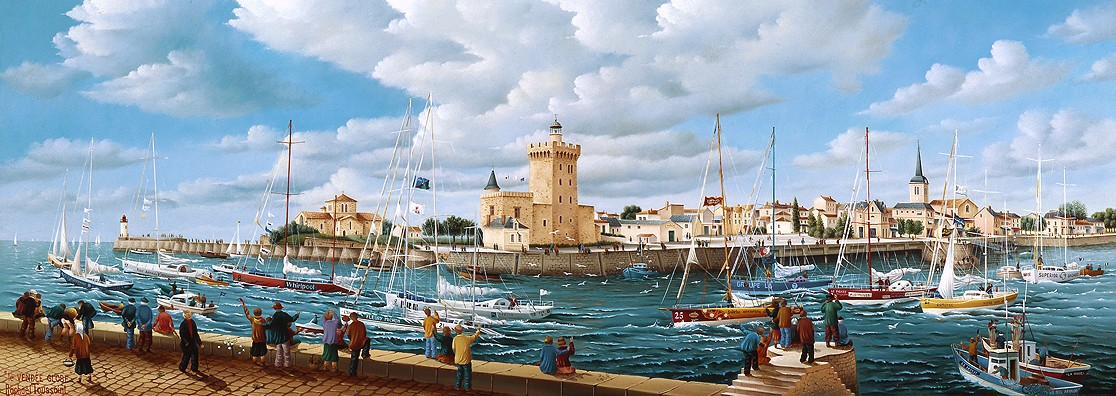
Hommage au Vendée Globe by Raphaël Toussaint, 1999

The race is open to monohull yachts conforming to the Open 60 class criteria. Prior to 2004, the race was also open to Open 50 boats. The Open classes are unrestricted in certain aspects, but a box rule governs parameters such as overall length, draught, appendages and stability, as well as numerous other safety features.

The race presents significant challenges; most notable are the severe wind and wave conditions in the Southern Ocean, the long unassisted duration of the race, and the fact that the course takes competitors far from the reach of any normal emergency response. A significant proportion of the entrants usually retire, and in the 1996–97 race Canadian Gerry Roufs was lost at sea.

=== Course ===
The race starts and finishes in Les Sables-d'Olonne, in the Département of Vendée, in France; both Les Sables d’Olonne and the Vendée Conseil Général are official race sponsors. The course is essentially a circumnavigation along the clipper route: from Les Sables d’Olonne, down the Atlantic Ocean to the Cape of Good Hope; then clockwise around Antarctica, keeping Cape Leeuwin and Cape Horn to port; then back to Les Sables d’Olonne. The race generally covers approximately 24,000 nautical miles (44,000 km) and runs from November to February, timed to place the competitors in the Southern Ocean during the austral summer.

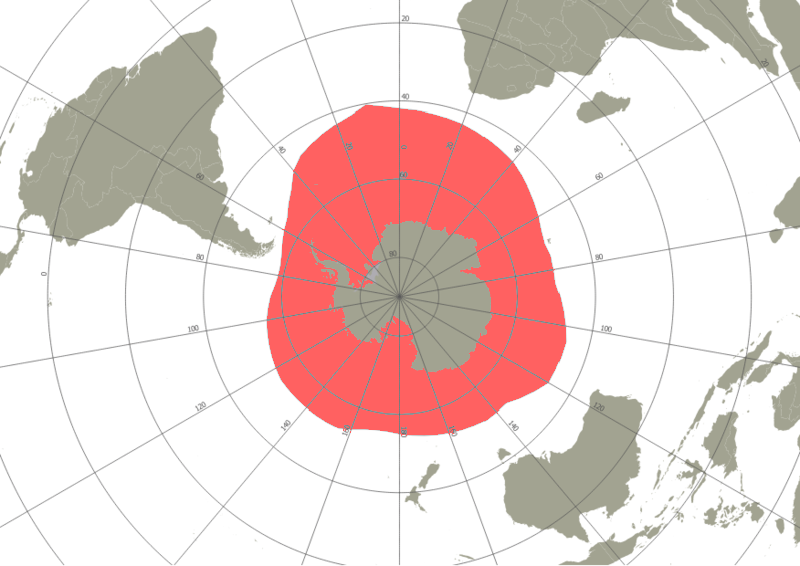
Ice Exclusion Zone

Additional waypoints may be set in the sailing instructions for a particular race, to ensure safety relative to ice conditions, weather, etc. There is also an exclusion zone set around Antarctica where competitors are prohibited from sailing due to the risk of icebergs.

The competitors may stop at anchor, but may not draw alongside a quay or another vessel; they may receive no outside assistance, including customised weather or routing information. The only exception is that a competitor who has an early problem may return to the start for repairs and then restart the race, as long as the restart is within 10 days of the official start.

=== Qualification ===
To mitigate the risks, competitors are required to undergo medical and survival courses. They must also be able to demonstrate prior racing experience; either a completed single-handed trans-oceanic race or the completion of a previous Vendée Globe. The qualifying race must have been completed on the same boat as the one the sailor will race in the Vendée Globe; or the competitor must complete an additional trans-oceanic observation passage, of not less than 2,500 miles (4,000 km), at an average speed of at least 7 knots (13 km/h), with his or her boat.

== Participation ==
	1989–90	1992–93	1996–97	2000–01	2004–05	2008–09	2012–13	2016–17	2020–21	2024–25	Total
Finishers Overall
Total	7	7	6	15	13	12	11	18	25	32	146
First Time	7	5	6	12	9	9	5	12	18	16	99
Start / Finishers (%)	53.8	50	40	62.5	65	40	55	62.1	75.8	80	61.3
Male	7	7	5	14	11	10	11	18	21	27	131
Male - First Time	7	5	5	11	7	7	5	12	14	13	86
Female			1	1	2	2	0		4	5	15
Female - First Time			1	1	2	2	0		4	3	13
Starters
Total	13	14	15	24	20	30	20	29	33	40	238
First Time	13	10	12	15	12	16	5	14	18	15	130
Male	13	14	13	22	18	28	19	29	27	34	217
Male – First Time	13	10	10	13	10	14	5	14	13	13	115
Female	0	0	2	2	2	2	1	0	6	6	21
Female – First Time	0	0	2	2	2	2	0	0	5	2	15
Starter Age
Youngest	27*	30*	29	24	29	25	27	23	27	23	23
Oldest	46*	64*	57	59	54	58	57	66	61	65	66
Mean	38*	39*	39	39	40	41	42	44	43	43	–
Starters' Nationality
AUS					1			0.5	0.5		2
AUT					1	1					2
BEL			1	1						1	3
CAN			1		0.5	1					2.5
CHN										1	1
ESP		1		1		1	1	1	1		6
FIN									1		1
FRA	11	8.5	10	12.5	12.5	17	12.5	19.5	22	26.5	152
GBR		2	2	4	3	7	3	1	4	3	29
GER									1.5	1.5	3
HUN		1	1					1		1	4
ITA		1		2			0.5		1	1	5.5
IRL								1			1
JPN								1	1	1	3
NED								1			1
NZL								0.5		0.5	1
POL							1				1
RSA	1										1
RUS				1							1
SUI		0.5		2.5	1	2	2	1	1	3	13
USA	1				1	1		1.5		0.5	5

Note * Some sailors dates of birth unknown

== Results ==
=== Overall winners ===
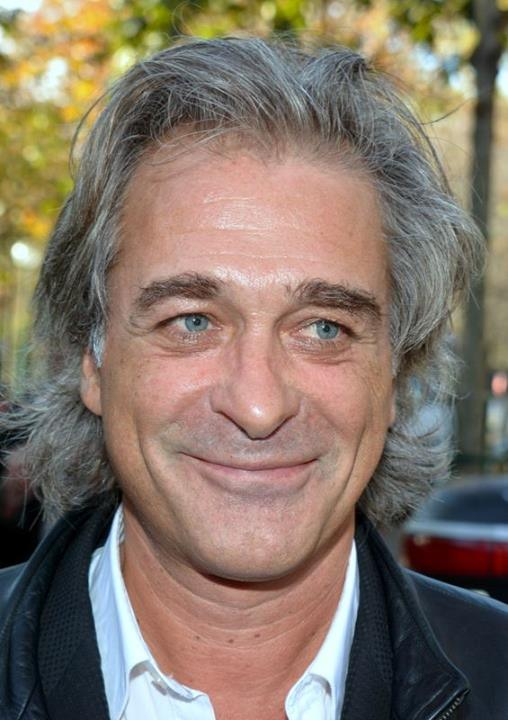
Titouan Lamazou (FRA) Écureuil d'Aquitaine II
1989–1990 Winner

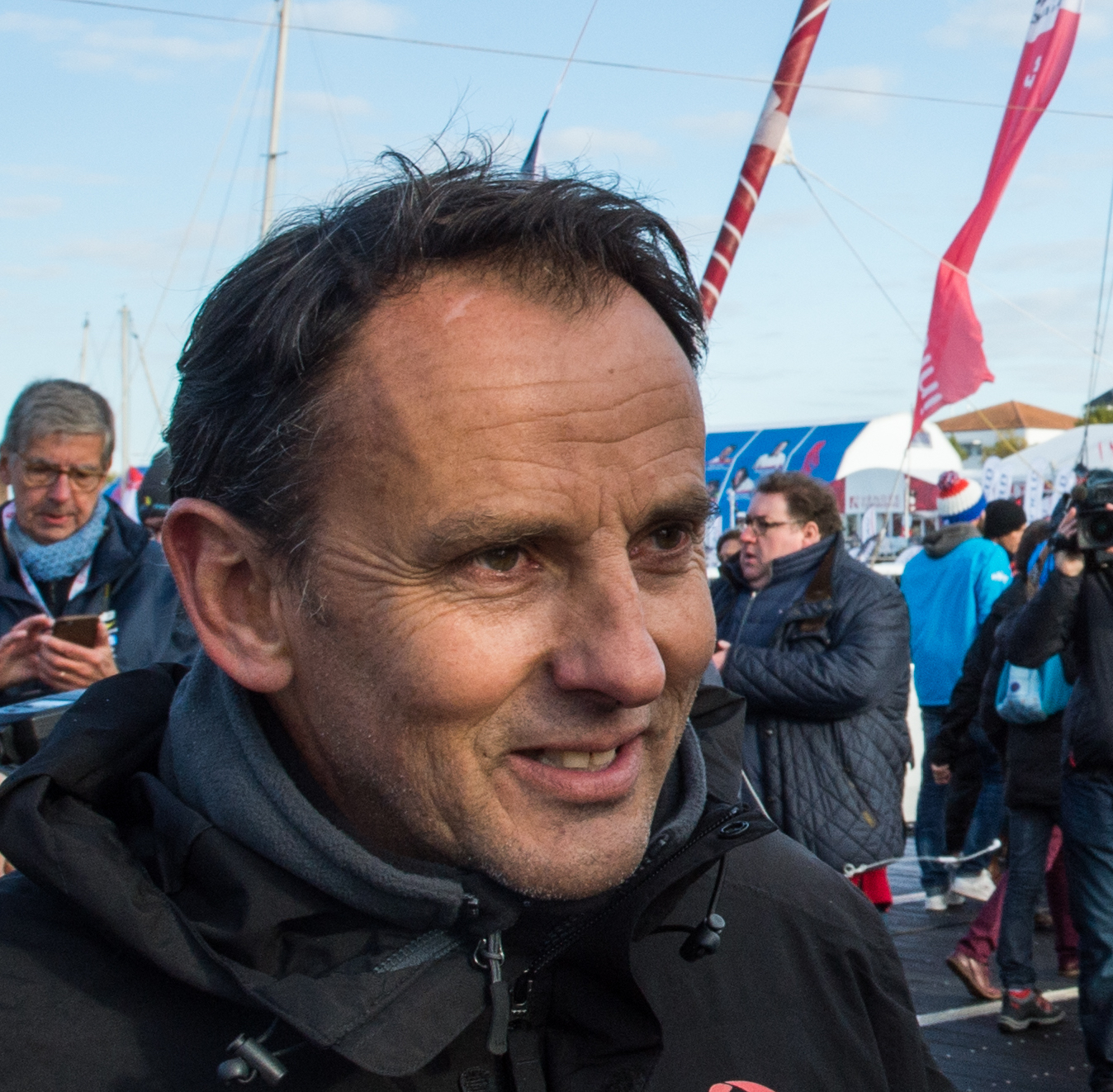
Alain Gautier (FRA)
Bagages Superior
1992–1993 Winner

Christophe Auguin (FRA)
Geodis
1996–1997 Winner

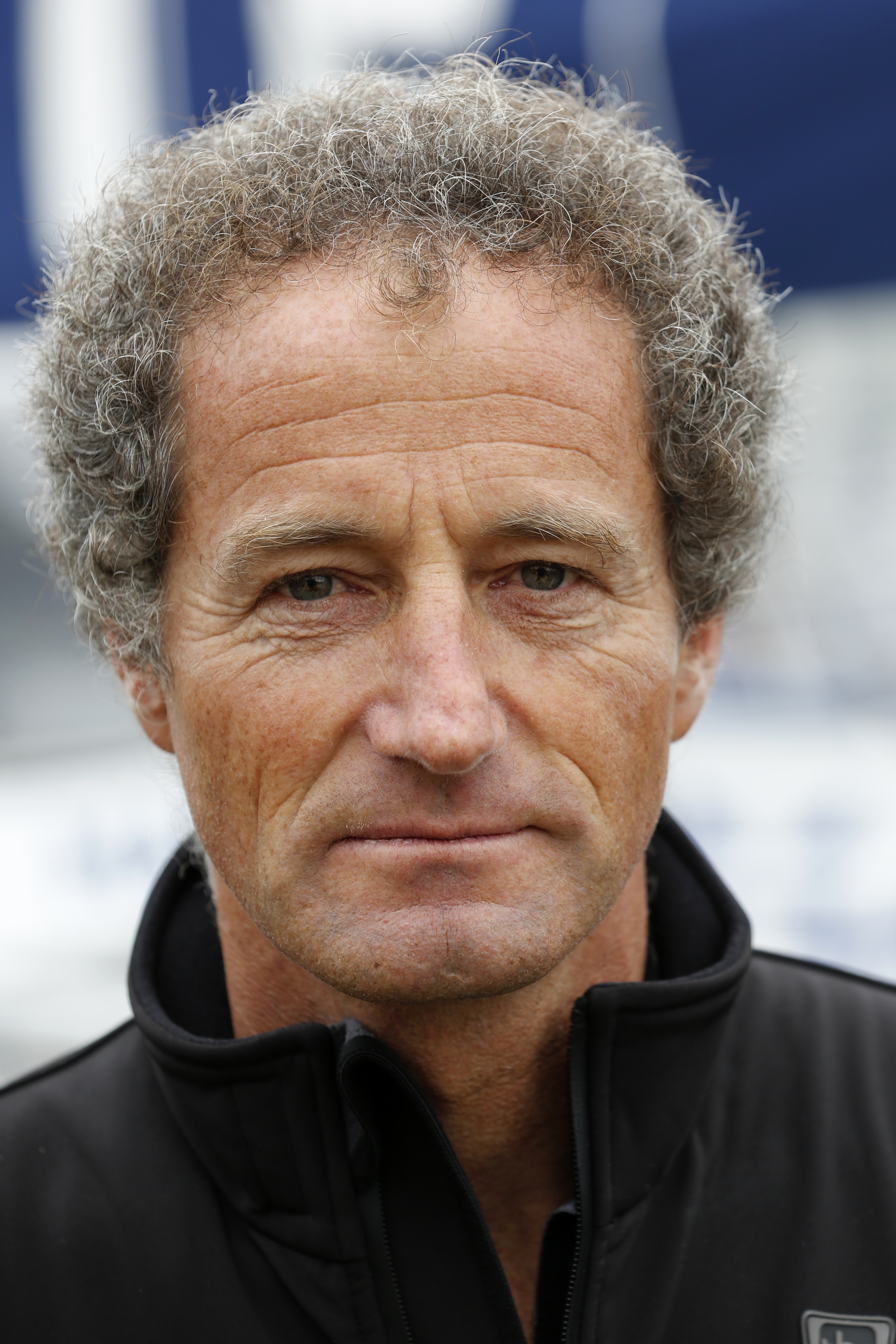
Michel Desjoyeaux (FRA)
PRB 2
2000–2001 Winner

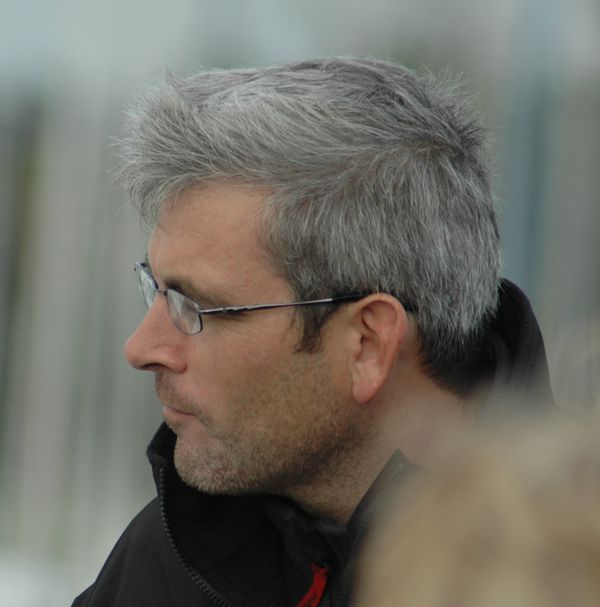
Vincent Riou (FRA)
PRB 2
2004–2005 Winner

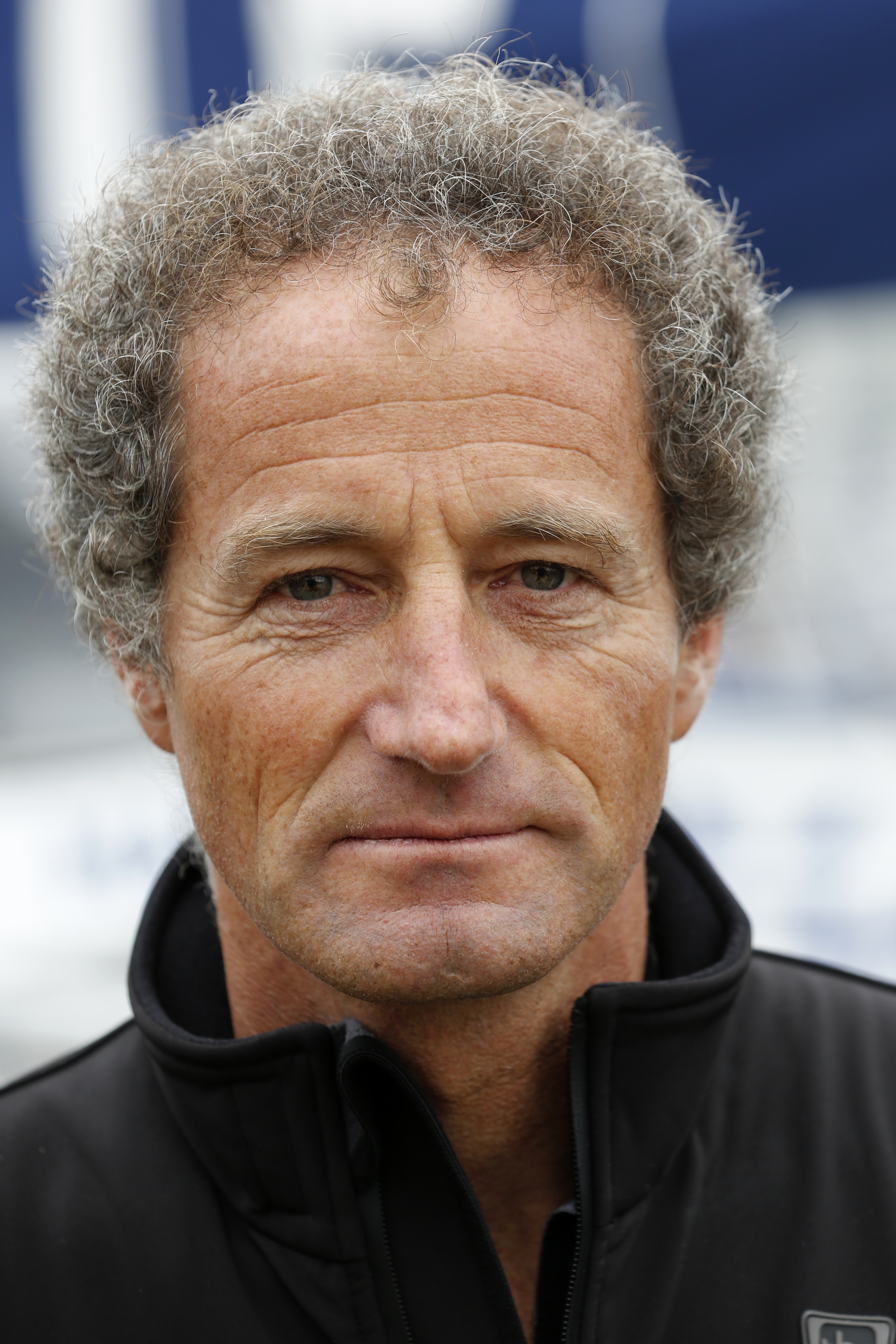
Michel Desjoyeaux (FRA)
Foncia
2008–2009 Winner

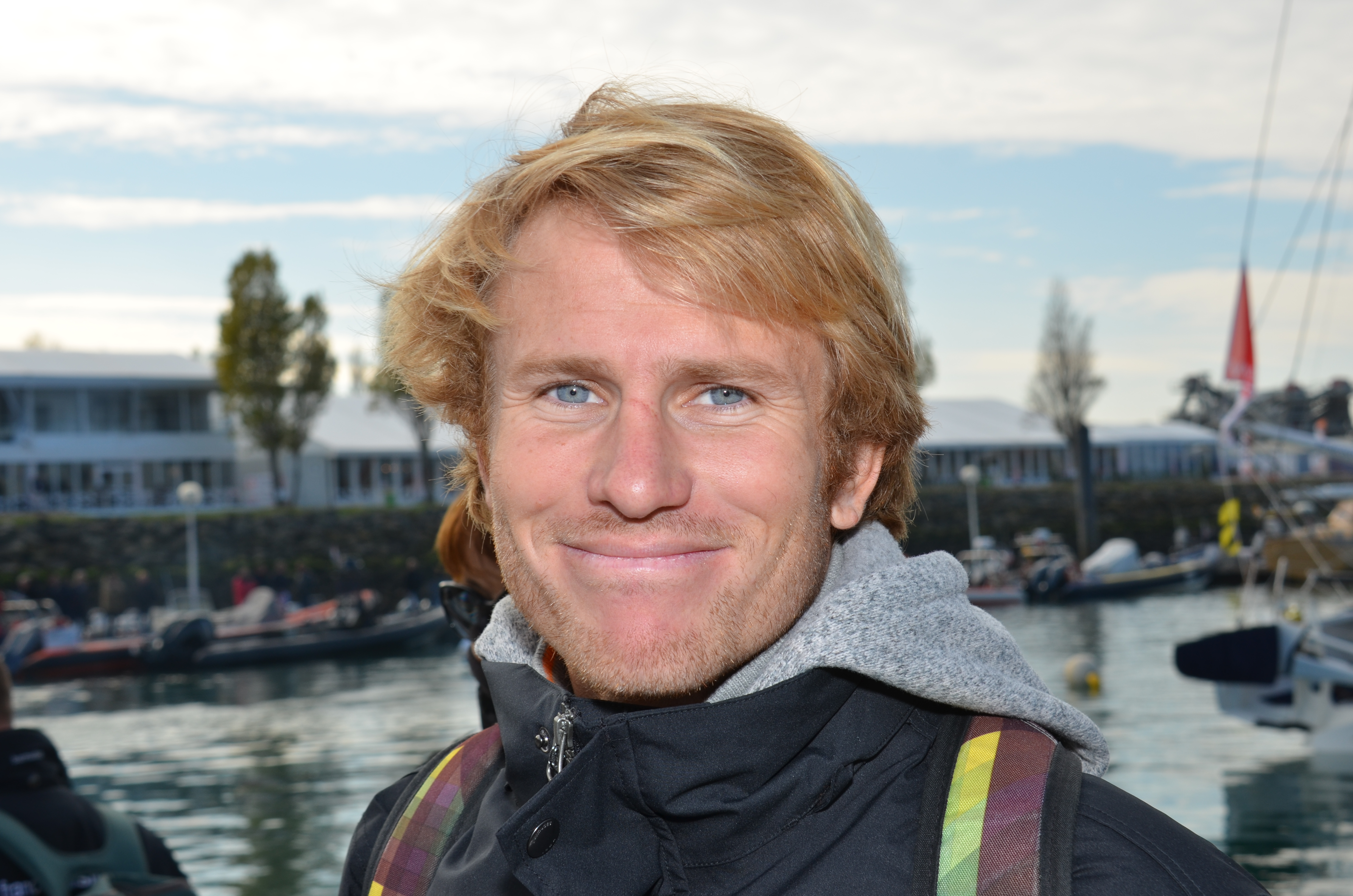
François Gabart (FRA)
Macif
2012–2013 Winner

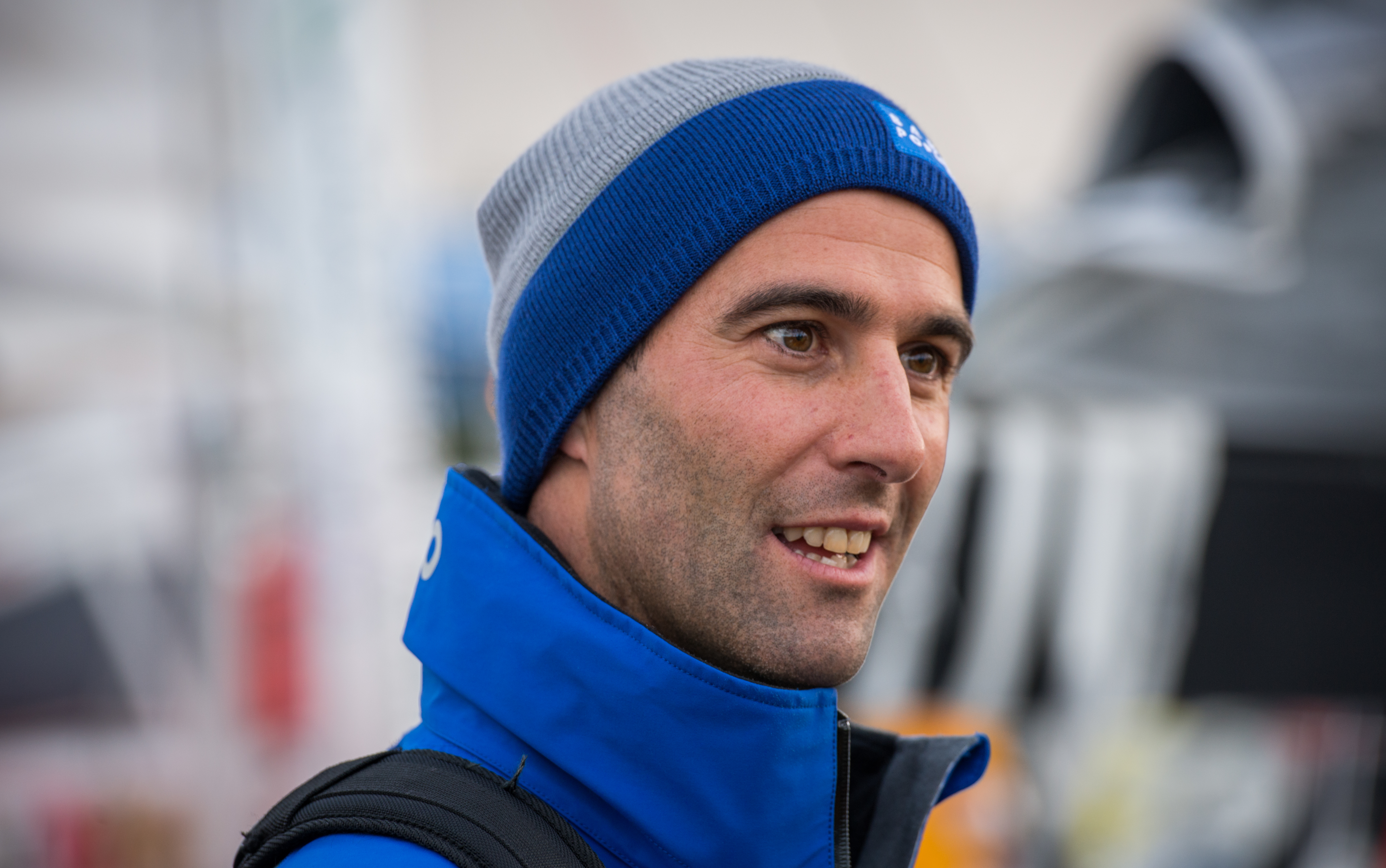
Armel Le Cléac'h (FRA)
Banque Populaire VIII
2016–2017 Winner

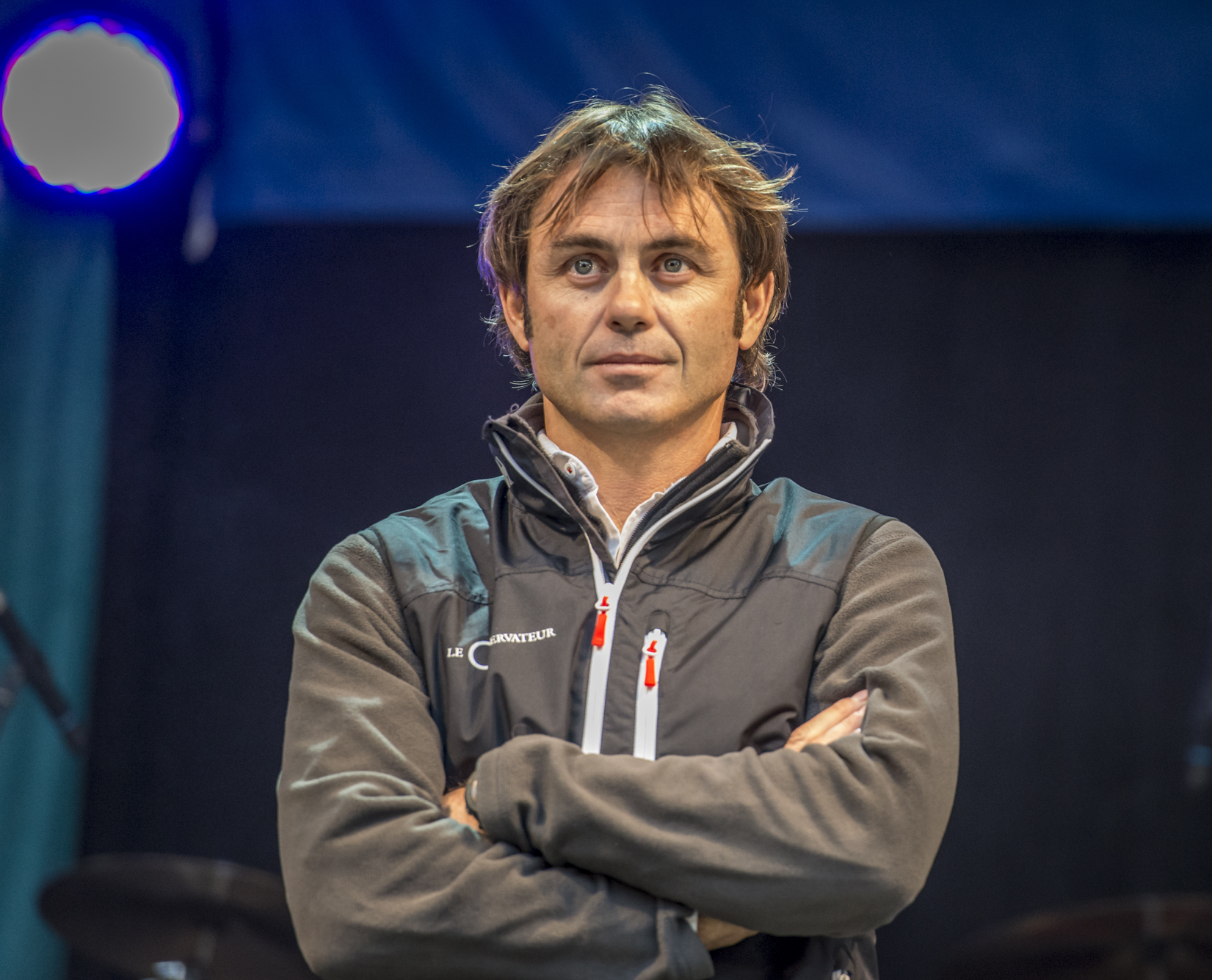
Yannick Bestaven (FRA)
Maître Coq IV
2020–2021 Winner

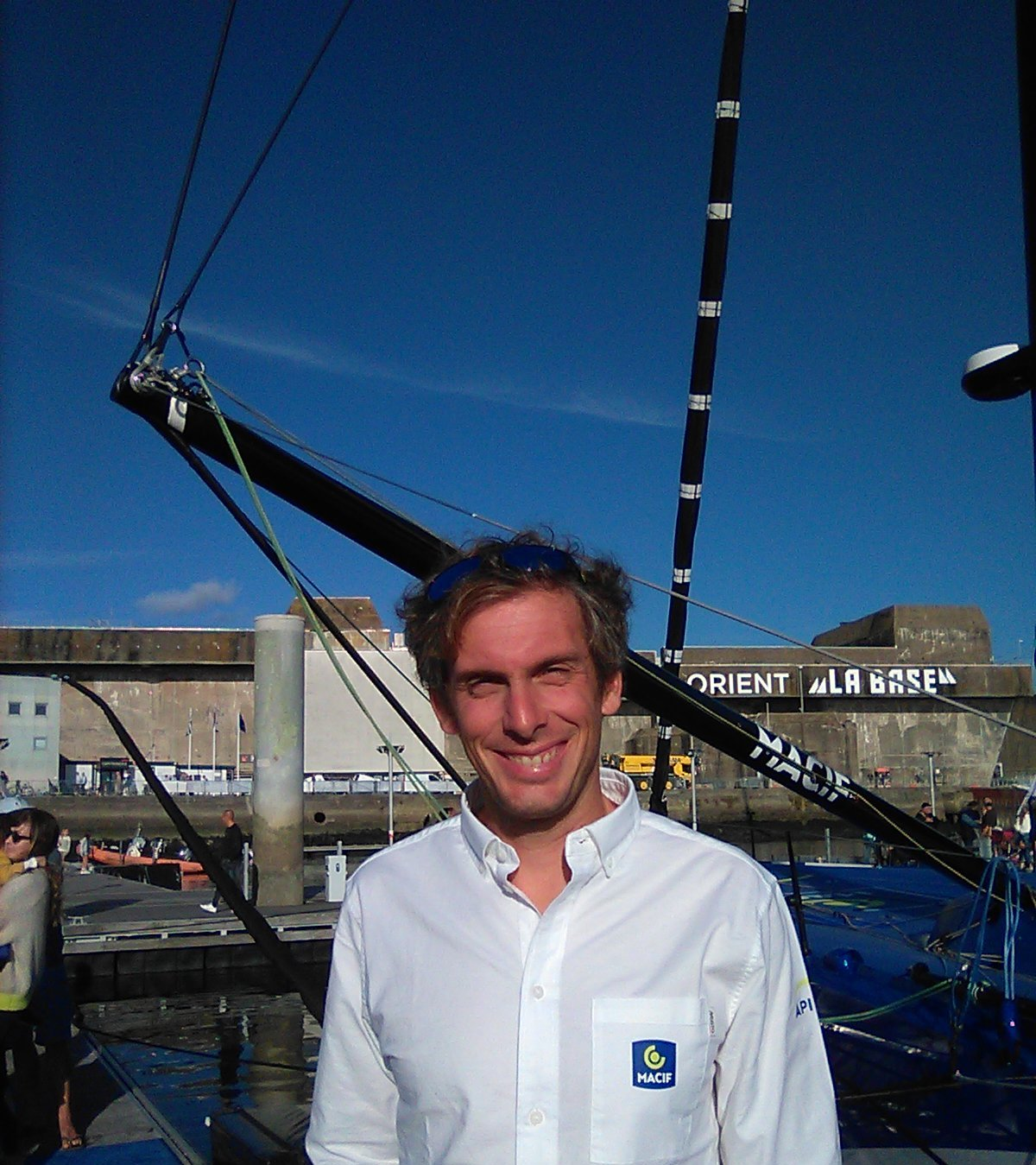
Charlie Dalin (FRA)
Macif Santé Prévoyance
2024–2025 Winner

=== Overall winners' times ===
Ed	Year	Skipper / Boat Name	24hr Run	Equator	Cape of Good Hope	Leeuwin	Cape Horn	Equator	Finish Line
1	1989	Titouan Lamazou (FRA) / Écureuil d'Aquitaine II	304 nm						109d 08h 48m
2	1992	Alain Gautier (FRA) / Bagages Superior	339 nm						110d 02h 22m
3	1996	Christophe Auguin (FRA) / Geodis							105d 20h 31m
4	2000	Michel Desjoyeaux (FRA) / PRB 2							93d 03h 57m
5	2004	Vincent Riou (FRA) / PRB 2		10d 12h 13m	24d 02h 18m	36d 09h 48m	56d 15h 13m	72d 11h 24m	86d 32h 13m
6	2008	Michel Desjoyeaux (FRA) / Foncia	466 nm	13d 15h 41m	27d 00h 34m	37d 31h 23m	56d 15h 08m	71d 17h 12m	84d 03h 09m
7	2012	François Gabart (FRA) / Macif	534 nm	11d 00h 20m	23d 03h 43m	34d 10h 23m	52d 06h 18m	66d 01h 39m	78d 02h 16m
8	2016	Armel Le Cléac'h (FRA) / Banque Populaire VIII		09d 09h 56m	18d 03h 30m	28d 20h 12m	47d 00h 32m	61d 12h 21m	74d 03h 36m
9	2020	Yannick Bestaven (FRA) / Maître Coq IV	481.8 (7th)			35d 01h 25m	55d 00h 22m	69d 13h 16m	80d 03h 44m
10	2024	Charlie Dalin (FRA) / Macif Santé Prévoyance		11d 09h 03m	19d 03h 43m	29d 02h 10m	43d 11h 34m	56d 02h 36m	64d 19h 23m

=== Farthest distance covered in 24 hours ===
Edition	Year	Skipper	Boat name	nautical miles/24h
1	1989–1990	Titouan Lamazou (FRA)	Écureuil d'Aquitaine II	304
2	1992–1993	Alain Gautier (FRA)	Bagages Superior	339
3	1996–1997	Yves Parlier (FRA)	Aquitaine Innovations	374
4	2000–2001	Dominique Wavre (SUI)	Union bancaire privée	430
5	2004–2005	Roland Jourdain (FRA)	Sill et Veolia	439
6	2008–2009	Michel Desjoyeaux (FRA)	Foncia	466
7	2012–2013	François Gabart (FRA)	Macif	534
8	2016–2017	Alex Thomson (GBR)	Hugo Boss 6	536
9	2020–2021	Thomas Ruyant (FRA)	LinkedOut	515
10	2024–2025	Sébastien Simon (FRA)	Groupe Dubreuil	615

=== Winners' participation and equipment ===
Skipper Previous Participation and Boat Information
Year	Skipper	Previous Start/Finish (Best)	Name of Boat	Sail No.	Designer	Builder	Year Launched	Notes	Ref.
1989–1990	Titouan Lamazou (FRA)	N/A	Écureuil d'Aquitaine II		Luc Bouvet; Olivier Petit	Chantier Capitaine Flint	1989		
1992–1993	Alain Gautier (FRA)	1 / 1 6th	Bagages Superior		Finot-Conq	CDK Technologies (FRA)	1992	Aluminum Construction	
1996–1997	Christophe Auguin (FRA)	Never	Geodis		Finot-Conq	JMV Industries (FRA)	1994		
2000–2001	Michel Desjoyeaux (FRA)	Never	PRB 2	FRA 85	Finot-Conq	Mag (FRA)	1999		
2004–2005	Vincent Riou (FRA)	Never	PRB 2	FRA 85	Finot-Conq	Mag (FRA)	1999		
2008–2009	Michel Desjoyeaux (FRA)	1 / 1 (1st)	Foncia	FRA 101	Farr Yacht Design	CDK Technologies (FRA)	2007		
2012–2013	François Gabart (FRA)	Never	Macif	FRA 301	Verdier / VPLP	CDK Technologies (FRA); Green Marine (GBR)	2011		
2016–2017	Armel Le Cléac'h (FRA)	2 / 2 (2nd)	Banque Populaire VIII	FRA 18	Verdier / VPLP	CDK Technologies (FRA)	2015		
2020–2021	Yannick Bestaven (FRA)	1 / 0	Maître Coq IV	FRA 17	Verdier / VPLP	CDK Technologies (FRA)	2015-03-02	Hydrofoil	
2024–2025	Charlie Dalin (FRA)	1 / 1 (2nd)	Macif Santé Prévoyance	FRA 79	Verdier	CDK Technologies (FRA)	2023-06-24	Hydrofoil / SCOW	

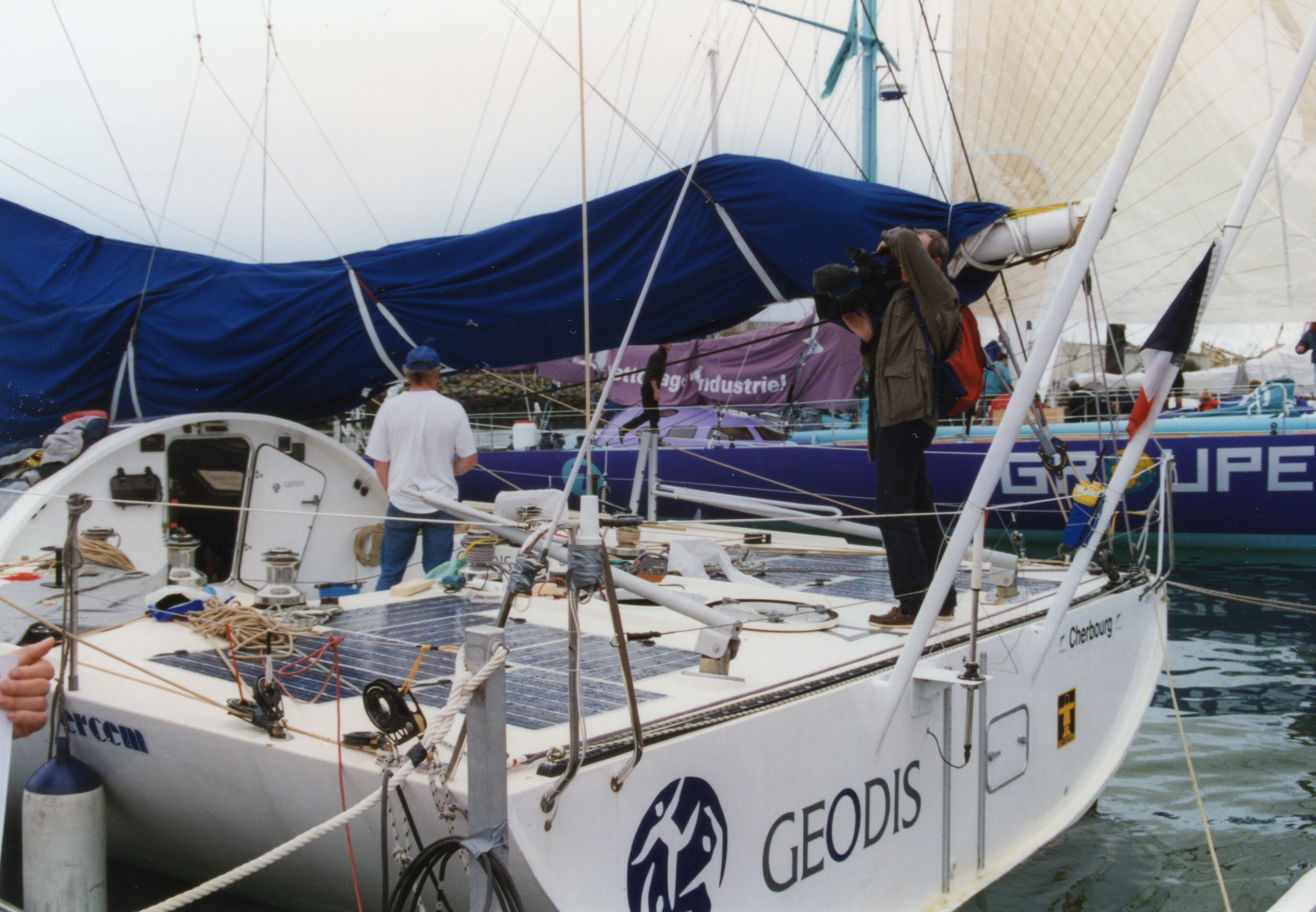

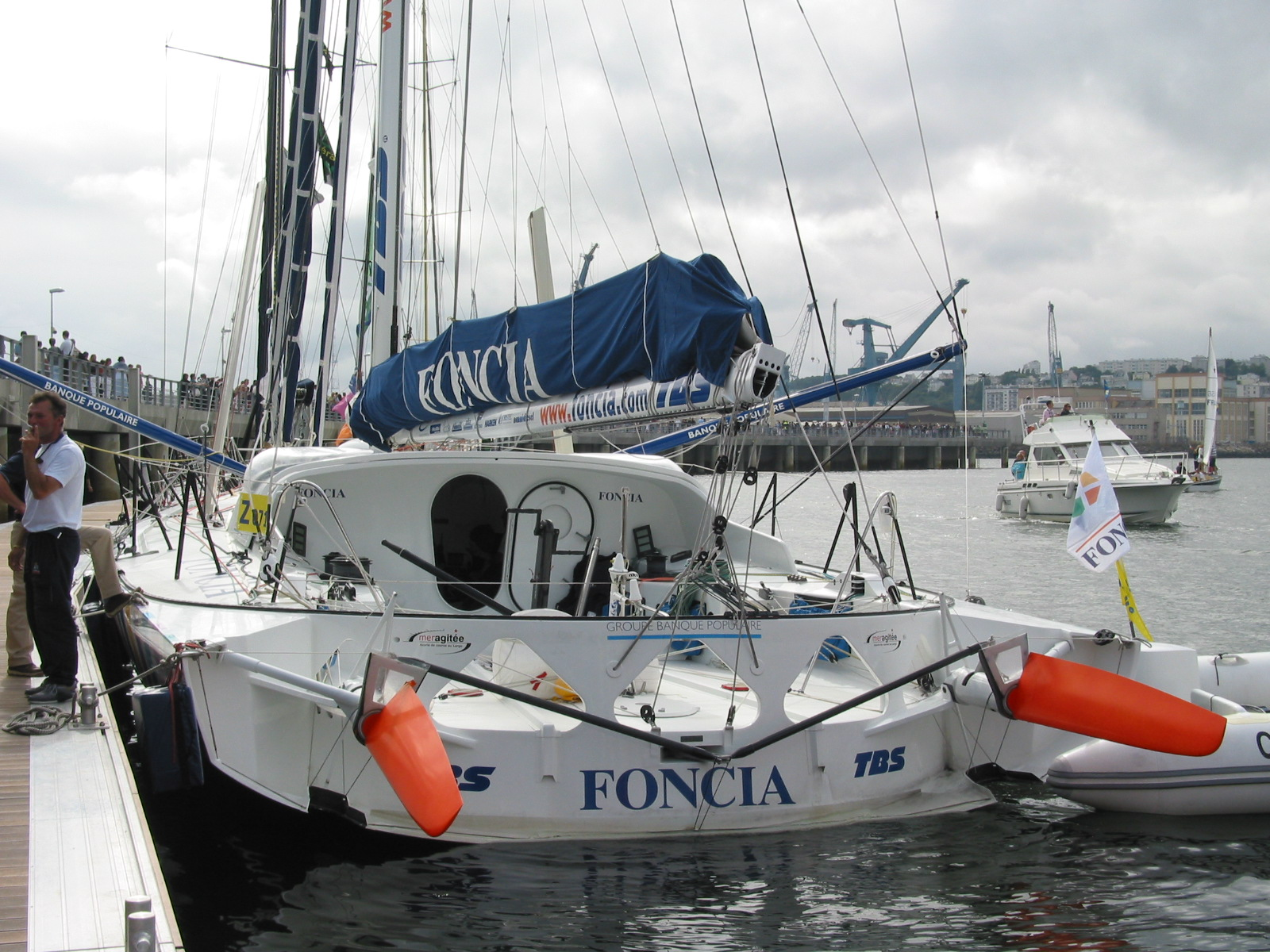

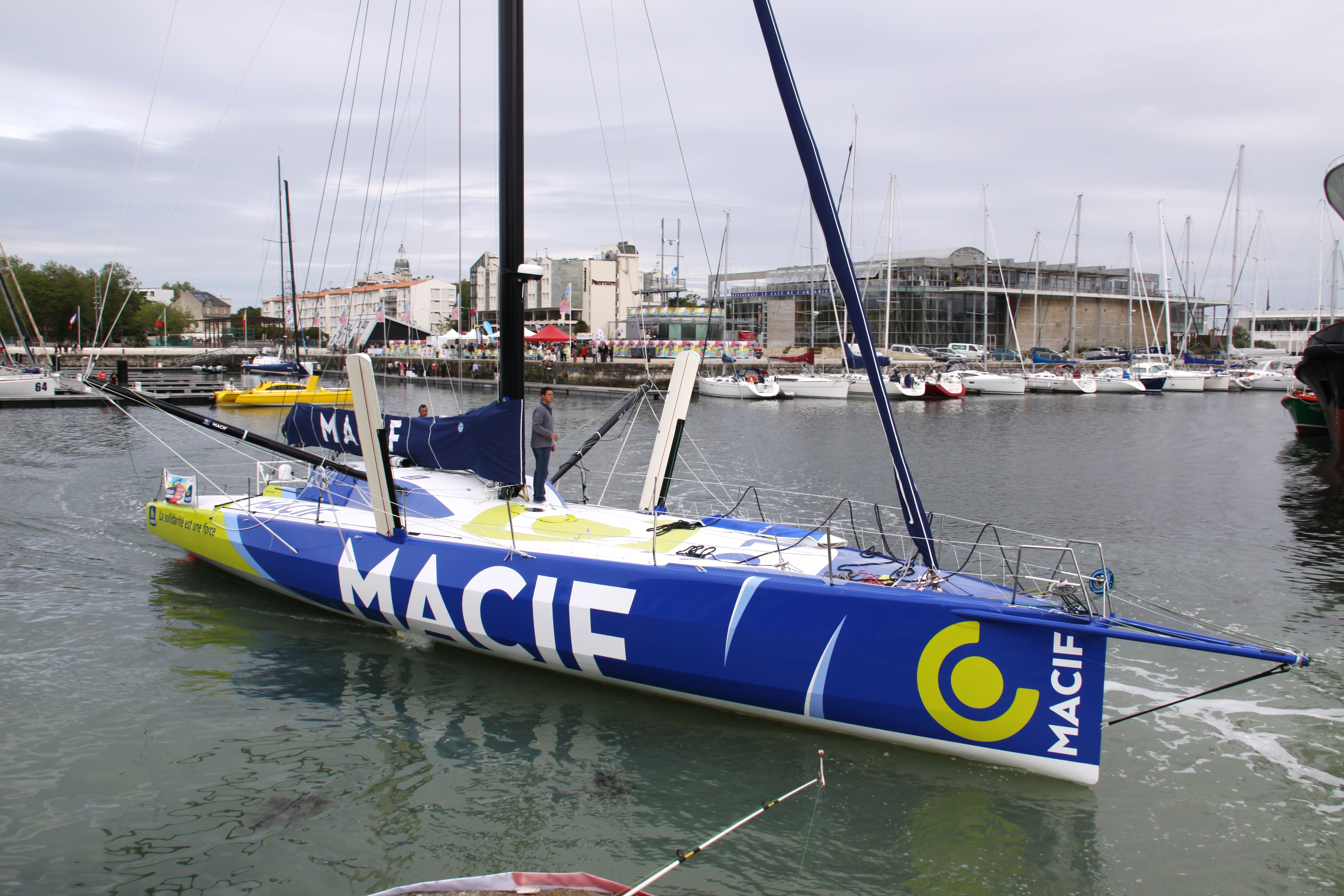

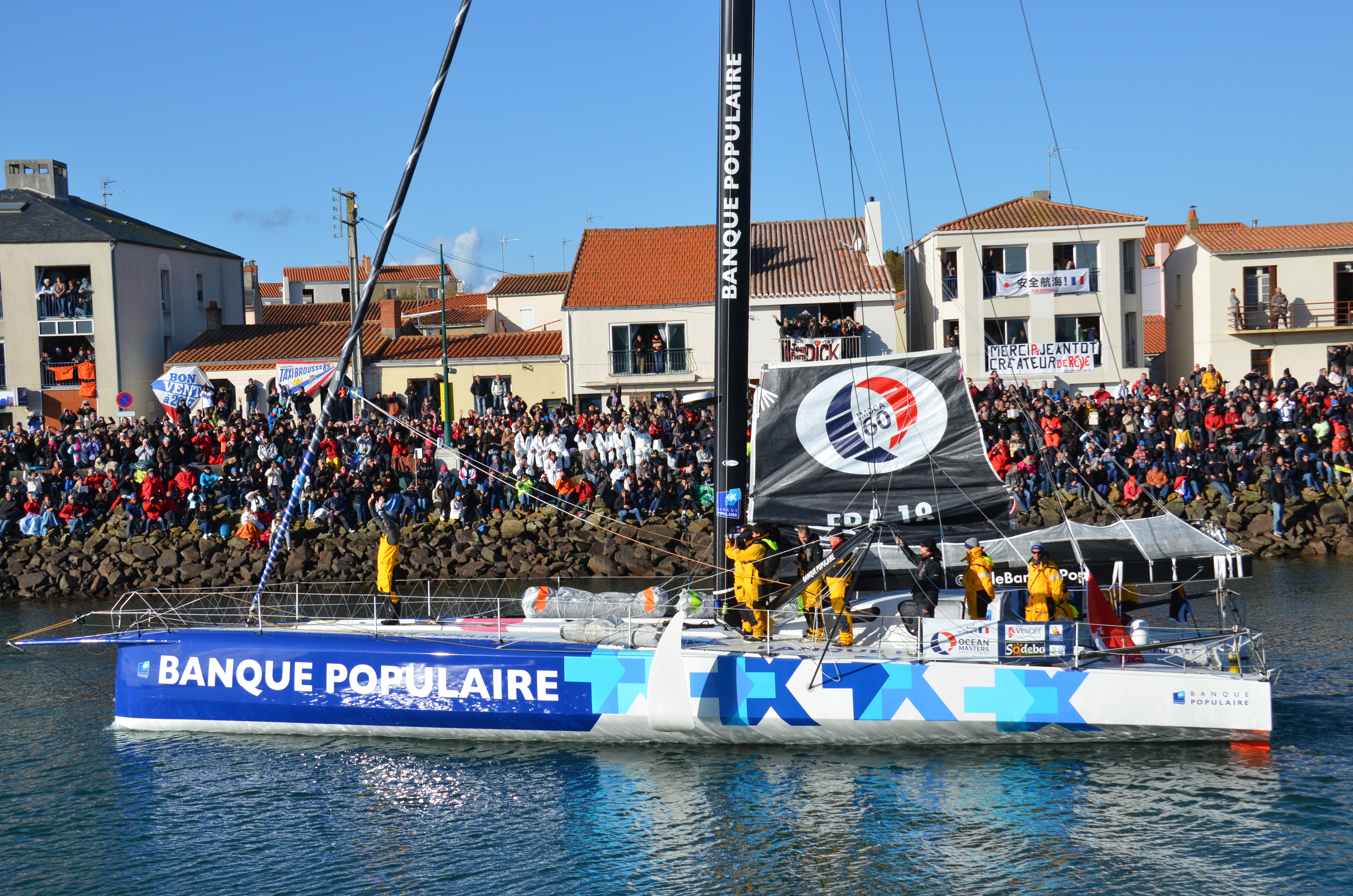

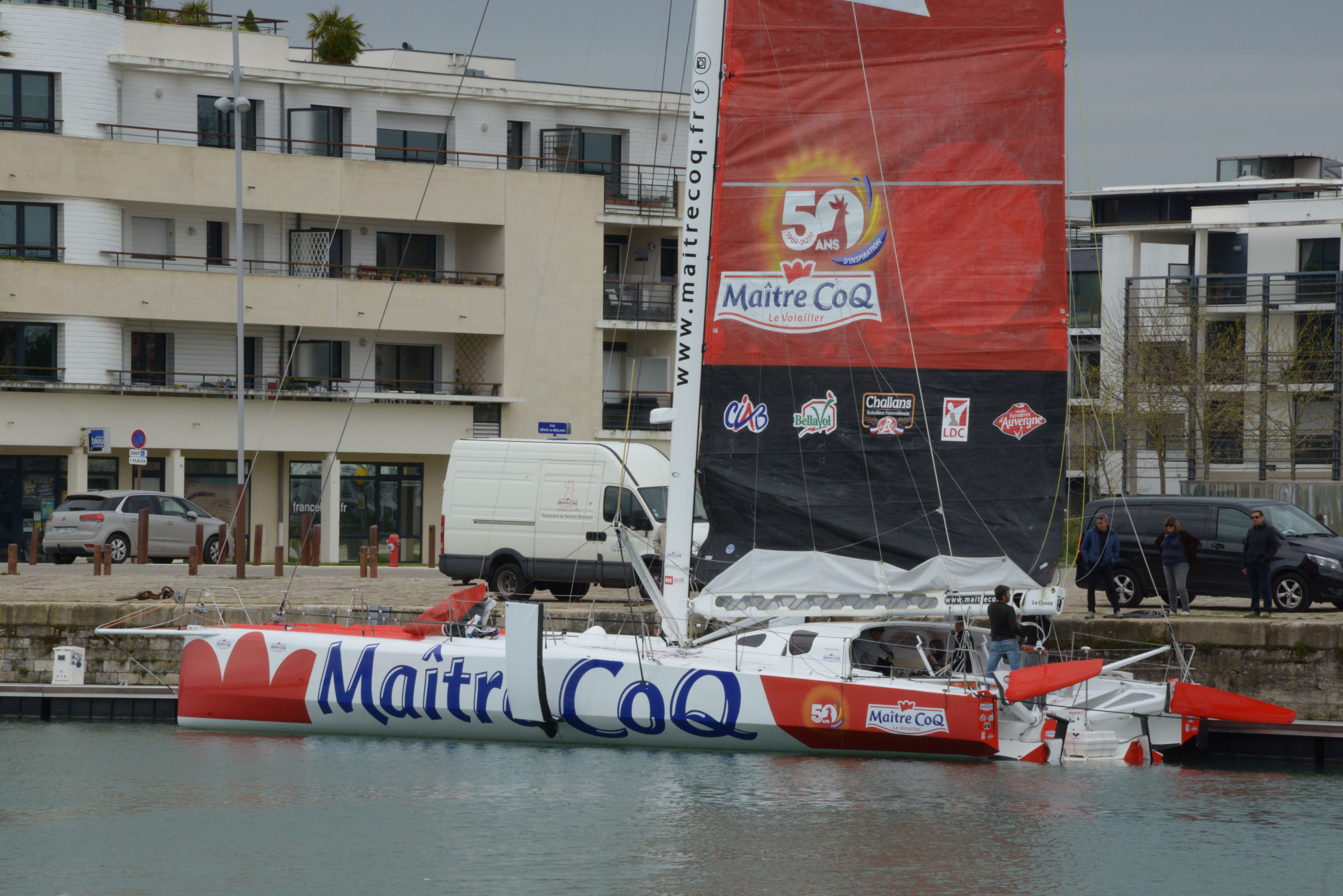

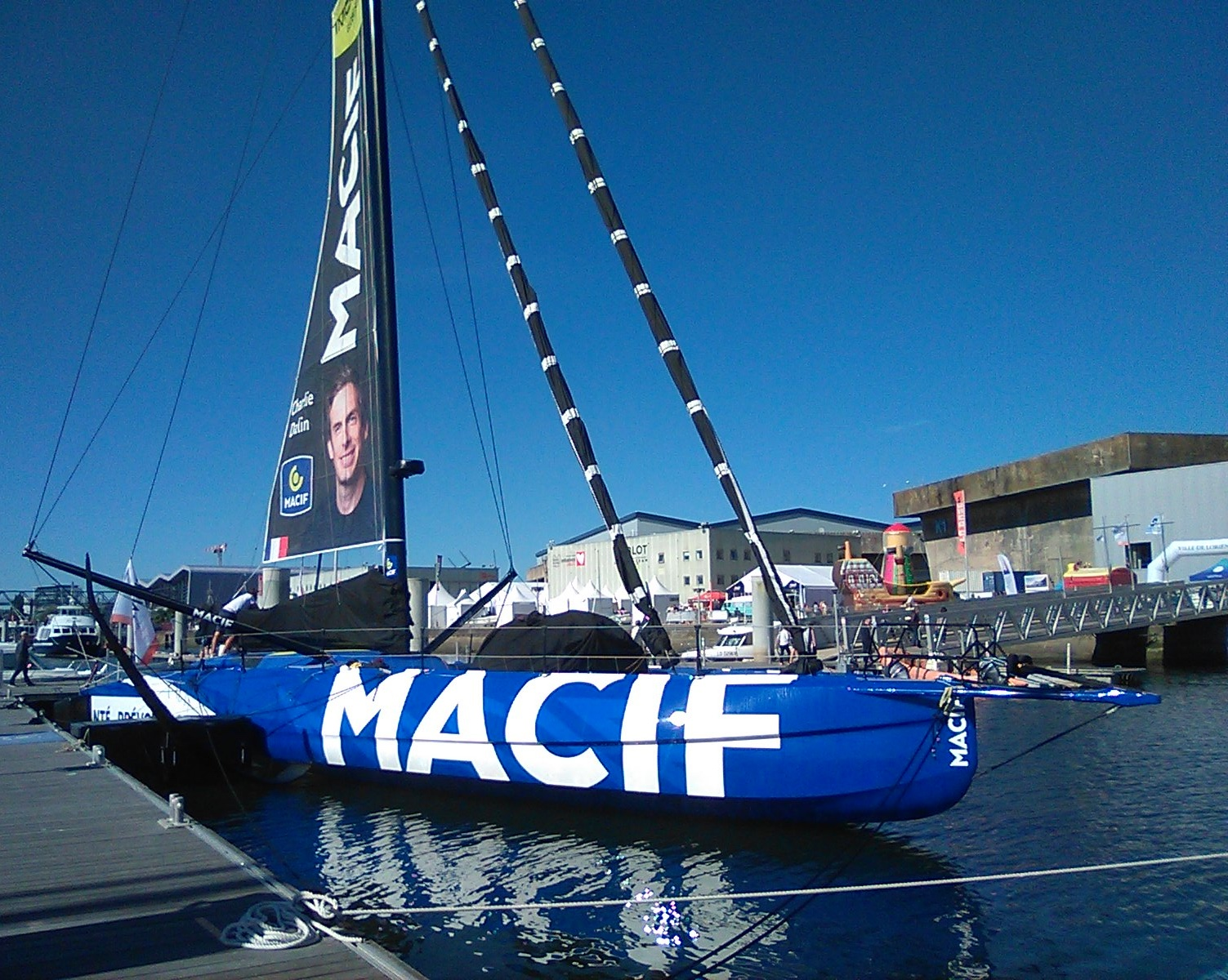

== See also ==
IMOCA races

- The Barcelona World Race, a non-stop two handed race, currently run using the IMOCA 60 Class.
- Route du Rhum
- The Velux 5 Oceans Race, a stopping solo race, currently run using the IMOCA 60 Class previously known as the BOC Challenge, later as Around Alone.
- The Ocean Race, a stopping fully crewed race, currently using the Volvo Ocean 65 and IMOCA 60 class. Previously known as the Whitbread Round The World Race and the Volvo Ocean Race.

Other races

- The Clipper Round the World Yacht Race, a stopping crewed race for amateur crews using the Clipper 70 Class.
- Jules Verne Trophy
- Oryx Quest
- Arkéa Ultim Challenge

Former races including

- The Sunday Times Golden Globe Race, held in 1968–1969, the first round-the-world yacht race.
- The BT Global Challenge, was a race held every four years and followed the westward route.
- The Race, was a race held in 2000, involving multihulls.
- The Oryx Quest, held in 2005, starting from Qatar.

Other speed sailing records

- Speed sailing record
- World Sailing Speed Record Council
- Transatlantic sailing record
- Circumnavigation
- List of circumnavigations
