= Titouan Lamazou =

French painter and writer

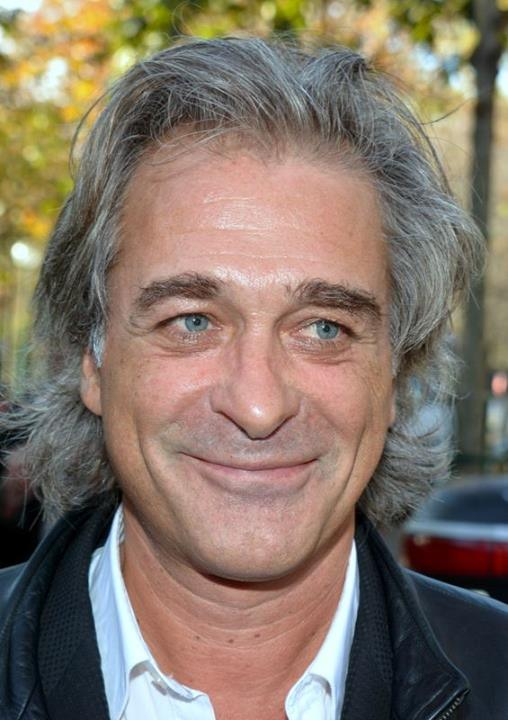

Personal information
- Nationality: French
- Born: 11 July 1955 (age 70) Casablanca, Morocco

Sailing career
- Sport: Sailing
- Class: IMOCA 60

Titouan Lamazou is a French navigator, artist and writer, born on 11 July 1955 in Casablanca, Morocco. He was actually born Antoine Lamazou, he officially took the name Titouan Lamazou in 1986. After a stint at the Fine Arts, he went travelling at the age of 18 where he met with Éric Tabarly who encouraged him into adventure sailing winning the first Vendée Globe in 1990.

== Distinctions ==
- 1990 - André de Saint-Sauveur Prize from the French Academy of Sports
- 1991 - Chevalier de l'ordre du Mérite Maritime Knight of the Order of Maritime Merit 1991
- 2003 = Official Navy Painter in 2003
- 2003 = UNESCO Artist for Peace, 2003
- 2017 - Chevalier de la Légion d'honneur Knight of the Legion of Honour on April 14, 2017
