= Macif (trimaran) =

Sailing vessel

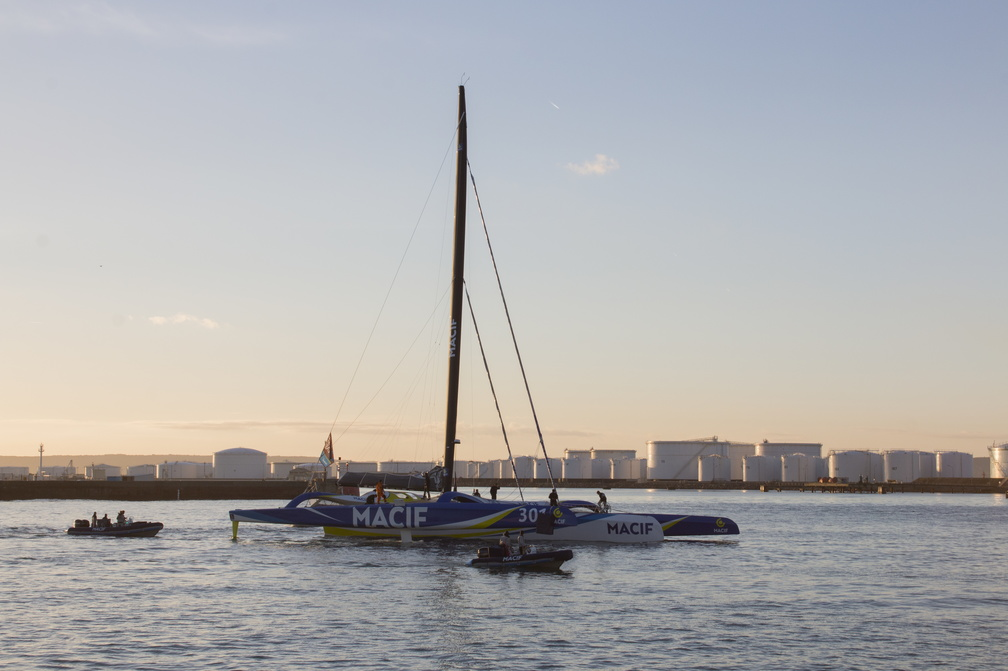
- Macif leaves the Port of Le Havre for the start of the Transat Jacques Vabre 2015
- Class: Ultim
- Designer(s): VPLP design
- Builder: CDK Technologies; Multiplast
- Launched: 18 August 2015
- Owner(s): Macif (French insurance company))

Racing career
- Skippers: François Gabart

Specifications
- Type: Maxi-trimaran
- Displacement: 14.5 t (14.3 long tons; 16.0 short tons)
- Length: 30 m (98 ft) (LOA)
- Beam: 21 m (69 ft)
- Draft: 4.5 m (15 ft)
- Mast height: 35 m (115 ft)
- Sail area: 430 m^{2} (4,600 sq ft) (to windward); 650 m^{2} (7,000 sq ft) (downwind)
- Crew: Pascal Bidégorry (during double-handed events)

Macif is a Ultim class maxi-trimaran launched in 2015.

== History ==
Macif was designed by the naval architectural firm Van Peteghem Lauriot-Prévost with the assistance of GSea Design for calculation of the structure. The yacht is built for long distance sailing competitions and attempts at sailing records.

With the yacht, skipper François Gabart has won the Transat Jacques Vabre in 2015 (sailing dual-handed with Pascal Bidégorry) and The Transat in 2016. In 2017, a new around the world sailing record for circumnavigation of the world was set by François Gabart at 42 days, 16 hours, 40 minutes, and 35 seconds. During this record around the world singlehanded, François Gabart covered 850.68 miles in 24 hours.
