= CDK Technologies =

French Boat Builder

- Industry: construction of pleasure boats
- Founded: 1984
- Founder: Hubert Desjoyeaux

CDK Technologies is a boat building company now located in Lorient (France) with a primary site in marine hub of Port-la-Forêt. It was founded in 1984, it specializes in the construction of prototype sailboats for offshore racing.

== History and main achievements ==
CDK Technologies was founded in 1984 by Hubert Desjoyeaux, Jean Le Cam, Gaëtan Gouerou and architect Marc Van Peteghem of VPLP Design fame. Among the company's achievements are Formula 40 multihulls in the 1980s, as well as Olivier de Kersauson's1 trimaran Poulain, Foncia (2007), the monohull with which Michel Desjoyeaux won the 2008-2009 Vendée Globe and Maxi Banque Populaire V, a yacht designed for crewed records. And IMOCA 60 Macif, launched on August 16, 2011, winner of the 2012-2013 Vendée Globe skippered by François Gabart.

A lot of boats it produce are moulded by other companies with CDK specialising in the final assembly and fitout of the boats. The yard has had several success notably won the Vendée Globe and Oceanic World Records.
