= Armel Le Cléac'h =

French navigator and skipper

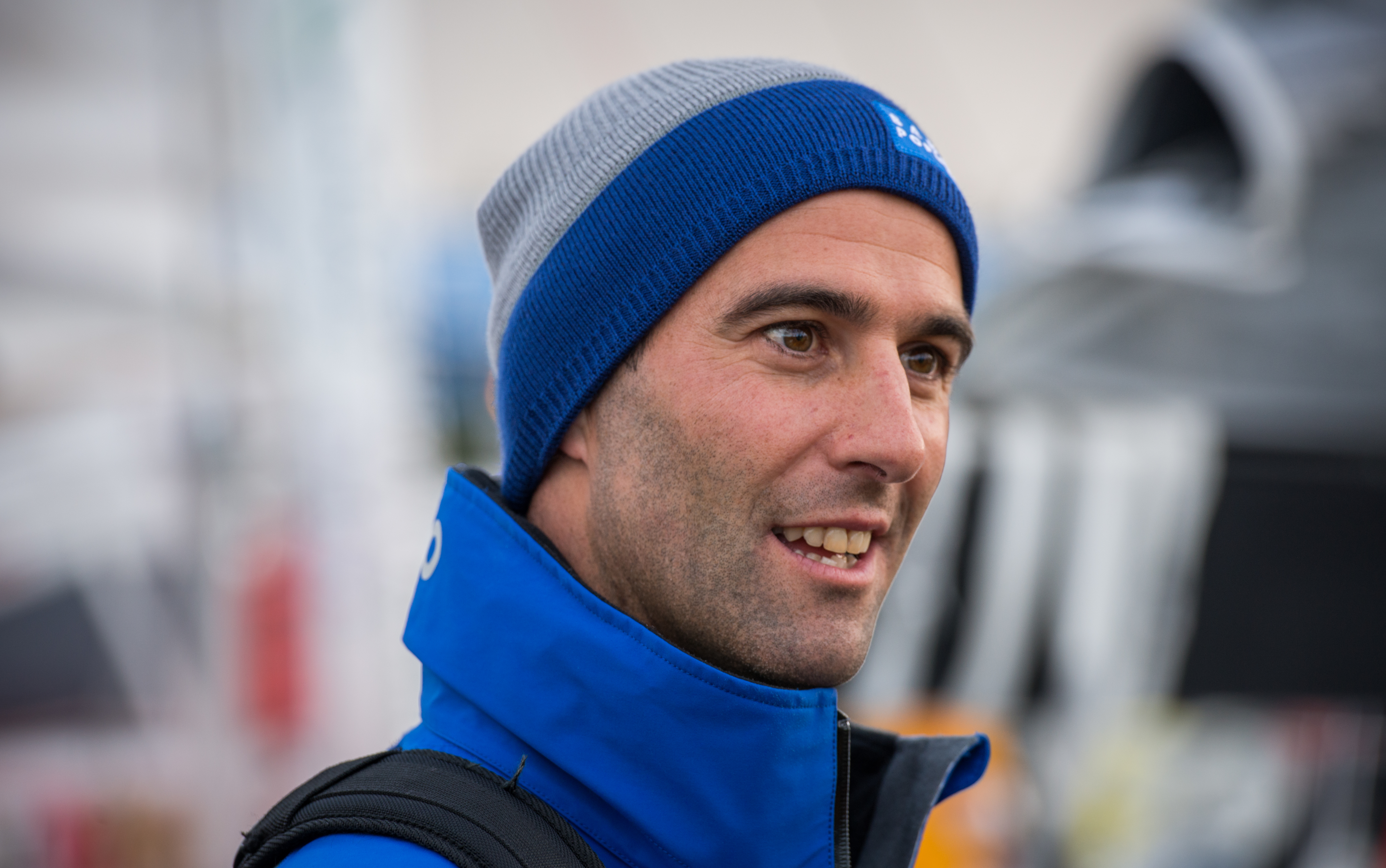
Armel Le Cléac’h in 2016

Armel Le Cléac’h (Breton pronunciation: [aʁmɛl lə 'kleax]; born 11 May 1977 in Saint-Pol-de-Léon) is a French professional navigator and sea captain. He was the IMOCA world champion in 2008 and French champion in single-handed yacht race in 2003. He notably won the Solitaire du Figaro twice (2003 and 2010), the Transat AG2R in 2004 and 2010 and the Single-Handed Trans-Atlantic Race in 2016. He finished second in both the 2008–09 (first participation) and 2012–13 (second participation) editions of the Vendée Globe. In the Vendée Globe 2016–17, he finished first with a new record time of 74d, 3h 35m, 46s. His performance earned him the 2018 Laureus World Sports Award for Action Sportsperson of the Year.

== Biography ==
Armel Le Cléac’h was born on 11 May 1977 in Saint-Pol-de-Léon. He spent his childhood sailing in the Morlaix bay and started competing in Optimist-class dinghies at eight years old. He later joined the Finistère team before competing in the 420 class and sailing in the Solitaire du Figaro.

In Saint-Pol-de-Léon, Le Cléac’h attended the Collège Sainte Ursule, then obtained a scientific baccalauréat in the lycée du Kreisker. Later, he takes an engineering course in IUT Mesures physiques in Lannion and joins the 3rd year in the INSA de Rennes in Sport Excellence class, which allows him to balance sailing training and engineering classes during 3 years.

== Sailing career ==
Le Cléac’h began his professional sailing career in 1999.

He was the IMOCA world champion in 2008 and French champion in single-handed yacht race in 2003, he notably won the Solitaire du Figaro twice (2003 et 2010), the Transat AG2R in 2004 and 2010 and the Single-Handed Trans-Atlantic Race in 2016. He finished second in the Vendée Globe, during the 2008-2009 (first participation) and 2012-2013 editions (second participation). Cléac’h won the Vendée Globe 2016–2017 with a record of 74d 3h 35' 46" with Banque Populaire VIII designed by Verdier/VPLP design.

== Achievements ==
He was the winner of the 2016-17 Vendée Globe in a new record time of 74 days, three hours and 35 minutes. In 2018, he won the Laureus World Sports Award for Action Sportsperson of the Year.
