= François Gabart =

French professional offshore yacht racer

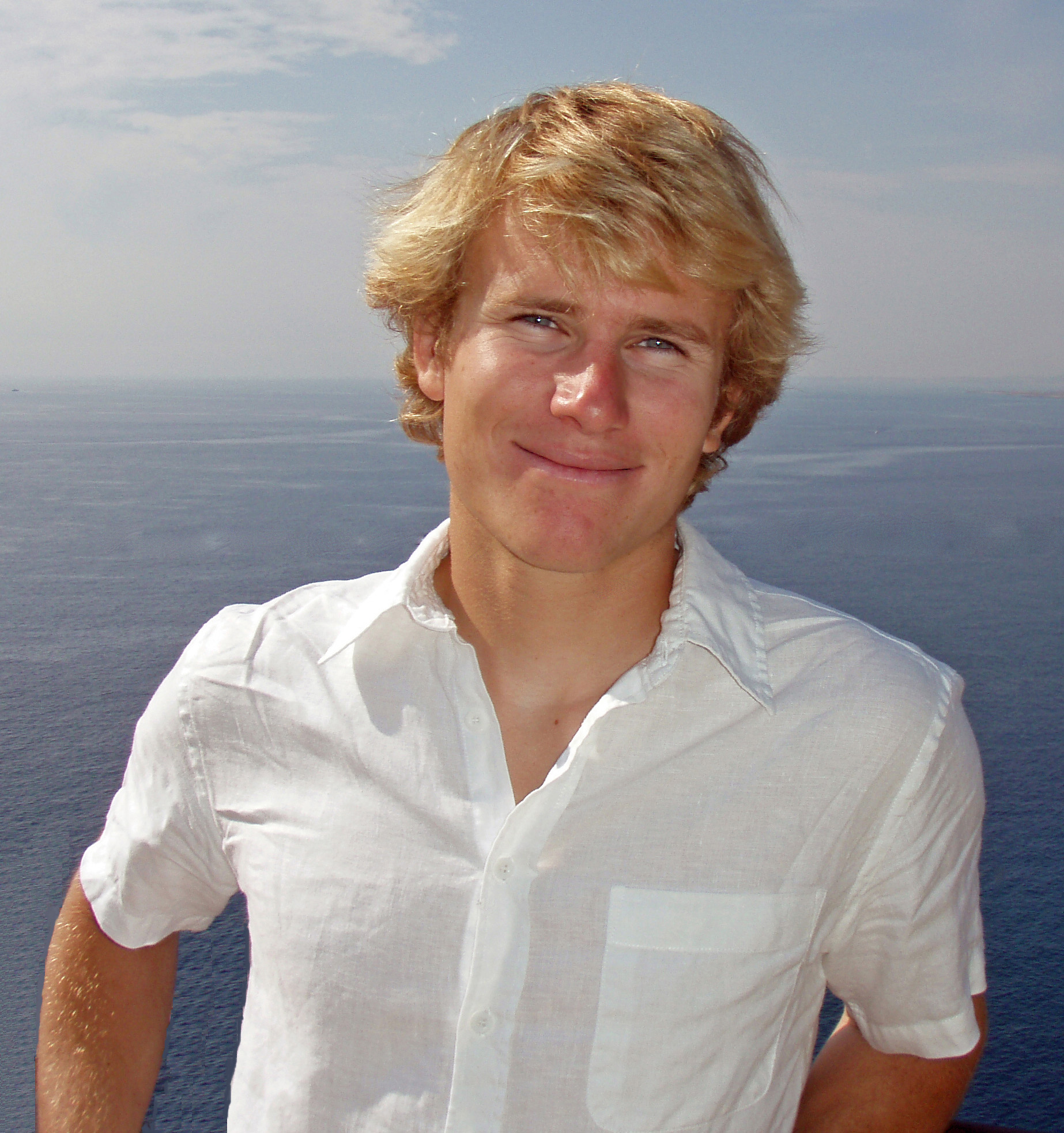
- François Gabart in Nice, September 2007.

Personal information
- Born: 23 March 1983 (age 43) Saint-Michel-d'Entraygues, France

Sailing career
- Sport: Sailing

François Gabart (born 23 March 1983 in Saint-Michel-d'Entraygues, France) is a French professional offshore yacht racer who won the 2012-13 Vendée Globe in 78 days 2 hours 16 minutes, setting a new race record. In 2017 he set the speed record for sailing around the globe, in 42 days 16 hours 40 minutes and 35 seconds, finishing on 17 December. He was sailing solo in the 30 metre Trimaran Macif.

== Results ==
- 2018:
  - 2nd of Route du Rhum
- 2017:
  - Around the world sailing record single-handed on board trimaran Macif in 42d 16h 40' 35"
- 2013:
  - Winner of 2012-2013 Vendée Globe on board IMOCA Macif (new record in 78d 2h 16' 40")
  - Winner of doublehanded Fastnet Race, with Michel Desjoyeaux, on board IMOCA Macif
  - Winner of doublehanded Artemis Challenge, with Michel Desjoyeaux, on board IMOCA Macif
  - Winner of doublehanded Trophée Azimut, with Michel Desjoyeaux, on board IMOCA Macif
  - 2nd of Défi Azimut on board IMOCA Macif
- 2012:
  - 2nd of Europa Warm'Up on board IMOCA Macif
- 2011:
  - Winner of Transat B to B on board IMOCA Macif
  - 2nd of Trophée Clairefontaine
  - 4th of Transat Jacques Vabre, doublehanded, with Sébastien Col on board IMOCA Macif
- 2010:
  - Singlehanded offshore racing French champion
  - 2nd of Solitaire du Figaro on board Figaro Macif
- 2009:
  - 2nd of Transat Jacques Vabre, with Kito de Pavant, on board IMOCA Groupe Bel
  - 3rd of Transat BPE (Figaro class)
  - 13th of Solitaire du Figaro
- 2008:
  - 16th of Solitaire du Figaro
- 2007:
  - Winner of Tour de France à la voile for students
- 2006:
  - Podium Bizuth (rookies podium) Course des Falaises (Figaro class)
  - London-Nice on board 60-ft trimaran Sopra (skipper Antoine Koch)
- 2005:
  - Winner of Tour de France à la voile for students
- 2003:
  - Tornado Junior World Champion
- 1999:
  - Moth France Champion
- 1997:
  - Optimist France Champion
