= Passage sailing record =

Passage records have been sanctioned, since 1972, by the World Sailing Speed Record Council (WSSRC).

== Global ==
=== Around the world sailing record ===
See Around the world sailing record

=== Hong Kong to London ===
12948 nm

Time	Date	Boat	Boat Type	Crew	Notes	Ref.
Outright
41d 21h 26m 34s	Sep 08	"Gitana 13"		Lionel Lemonchois (FRA)		
36d 2h 37m 12s	Feb 18	"Maserati"		Giovanni Soldini (ITA)		
31d 23h 36m 46s	Feb 20	"IDEC Sport"		Francis Joyon (FRA)		

== Transatlantic ==
See Transatlantic sailing record

== Northern European ==
=== Round Britain and Ireland ===
Time	Date	Boat	Boat Type	Crew	Notes	Ref.
Outright
3d 03h 32m 36s	2014-08-14	Oman Sail-Musandam	70 ft Tri - MOD 70	Skipper - Sidney Gavignet (FRA); Crew - Damian Foxall (IRL); Crew - Fahad Al Hasni (OMA); Crew - Sami Al Shukaili (OMA); Crew - Yassir Al Rahbi (OMA); Crew - Jan Dekker (FRA) (RSA)	Set during the RORC RBI Race	
3d 03h 49m 14s	2011-07-07	Banque Populaire V	Maxi Tri	Loick Peyron (FRA) + Crew		
4d 15h 09m 27s	2010-08-19	Oman Air Majan	100 ft Tri	Sidney Gavignet (FRA); No Crew!		
4d 16h 09m 36s	2002 Oct	PlayStation 2	125 ft Cat	Steve Fossett (USA) Skipper / Watch Captain; Chris Tibbs (GBR) Navigator; David Scully (USA) Watch Captain; Gino Morrelli (USA) Watch Captain; Quentin Dimmer (GBR) Crew; Mitch Booth (AUS) Crew; Mikaela Von Koskull (FIN); Howie Hamlin (USA) Crew; Simon Cotter (IRL) Crew; Mark Featherstone (GBR) Crew; Richard James (AUS) Crew; Nick Leggatt (RSA) Crew; David Thomson (GBR) Crew; Fraser Brown (NZL) Crew; Luc Trullemans (BEL) Onshore Meteorologist		
4d 17h 04m 23s	2002 Aug	Maiden 2	110 ft Cat	Skipper - Brian Thompson (GBR); Navigator - Sue Crafer; Crew 3 - Paul Larsen (AUS); Crew 4 - Fraser Brown; Crew 5 - Sharon Ferris (NZL); Crew 6 - Crew 7 - Crew 8 - Crew 9 - Crew 10 - Crew 11 - Crew 12 - Crew 13 - Crew 14 - Onshore Router Adrien Cahlan		
5d 21h 5m 27s	Oct 94	Lakota		Steve Fossett (USA), Helena Darvelid, Brian Thompson (GBR)+Others	Established ratified record	
Non-stop Monohull
4d 13h 10m 28s	2014 Aug	Azzam-Abu Dhabi Ocean Racing	Volvo Ocean 65	Ian Walker (GBR) +Crew		
5d 21h 26m 55s	2010 Aug	Groupama	Volvo Ocean 70	Frank Cammas (FRA) +Crew		
10d 18h 27m 23s	2000 Aug	Sail That Dream	IMOCA 50	Alex Thompson (GBR) +Crew		
Non-stop Solo
4d 15h 09m 27s	2010 Aug	Oman Air Majan	100 ft Tri	Sidney Gavignet (FRA)		
6d 06h 40m 31s	2006-08-14	Sodebo	ORMA 60 Trimaran	Thomas Coville (FRA)		
7d 08h 47m	2005 May	Adrien	85 ft Monohull	Jean Luc Van den Heede (NED)		
11d 12h 26m 48s	2004 June	Roaring Forty	Open 40 Monohull	Michel Kleinjans (BEL)		
18d 13h 59m 59s	2000 Aug	Zeal	38	Peter Keig (GBR)		
Non-stop Crewed Female
4d 21h 39m	2014 Aug	SCA	Volvo Ocean 65	Sam Davies (GBR) +Crew		
6d 10h 32m 27s	2010	Artemis Ocean Racing II	IMOCA 60	Jonny Malbon, skipper Graham Tourell; Mike Ferguson; Gareth Rowley; Simon Hiscocks		
6d 11h 30m 53s	2009	Aviva	IMOCA 60	Dee Caffari (GBR); Sam Davies (GBR); Miranda Merron (GBR); Alex Sizer (GBR)		
11d 6h 58m 17s	2000 Aug	Team Pindar	IMOCA 50	Miranda Merron (GBR); Emma Richards (GBR)		

=== Round Ireland ===
Time	Date	Boat	Boat Type	Crew	Notes	Ref.
Outright
1d 12h 52m 04s	2016-08-05	Phaedo 3	MOD 70 Tri	Lloyd Thornburg (USA) - Skipper, Brian Thompson (GBR) - Co-Skipper, Miles Seddon - Navigator, Damian Foxall (IRL) - Bow, Paul Allen - Trim, Sam Goodchild (GBR) - Trim, Henry Bomby (GBR) - Grinder, Fletcher Kennedy - Grinder		
1d 16h 51m 57s	2015-05	MOD 70 - Musandam-Oman Sail	MOD 70 Tri	Sidney Gavignet (FRA); Fahad Al Hasni (OMA); Yasser Al Rahbi (OMA); Sami Al Shukaili (OMA); Alex Pella (ESP); Jean Baptiste Levailland (FRA)	Set during the Round Island Race	
1d 20h 42m 20s	1993-09	Lakota	60 ft Tri	Steve Fossett (USA); Cathy McAleavey (IRL); Con Murphy (IRL) +Others	Established ratified record	
Solo
4d 01h 53m 29s	2005-10	Roaring Forty	Open 40	Michel Kleinjans (BEL)		
5d 12h 53m 46s	2005-09	afaom.com		Mick Liddy (IRL)		
7d 10h 24m 27s	2001-10	Zeal	38 Monohull	Peter Keig (GBR)		
Non-stop Monohull
2d 09h 41m 06s	2005-05	CityJet Solune	60 ft Monohull	Jean-Philippe Chomette (FRA); Cesar Dohy (FRA), Matthieu VINCENT (FRA); Chris TIBBS (GBR); Patrick TABARLY (FRA).		
3d 03h 27m 33s	2002-12	Irish Independent	S78	Gary Keegan (IRL)		
Female
3d 19h 41m 39s	2020-10-17	R L Sailing	Beneteau Figaro 3	Pamela Lee (IRL); Catherine Hunt (IRL)	Benchmark	
Doublehanded
3d 19h 41m 39s	2020-10-17	R L Sailing	Beneteau Figaro 3	Pamela Lee (IRL); Catherine Hunt (IRL)	Benchmark	
Outright 40 ft and under
3d 19h 41m 39s	2020-10-17	R L Sailing	Beneteau Figaro 3	Pamela Lee (IRL); Catherine Hunt (IRL)	Benchmark	

=== Around the Isle of Wight ===
50 nm

Time	Date	Boat	Boat Type	Crew	Notes	Ref.
Outright
3h 35m 38s	1994 Sep	"Lacota"		Steve Fossett (USA) + Others		
3h 10m 11s	2001 June	Dexia Eure et Loir	60 ft trimaran	Francis Joyon (FRA), Rodney Pattisson (GBR) + three crew	set during a scheduled RTI Race	
2h 33m 55s	2001 Nov	"PlayStation"		Steve Fossett (USA) + Others		
2h 21m 25s	2012-08-16	"Foncia"	MOD 70	Michel Desjoyeaux (FRA); Sir Robin Knox-Johnston (GBR), Ian Walker (GBR),+Others	set during a scheduled Cowes Week Race	
2h 04m 14s	2016 Aug	Phaedo 3	MOD 70	Brian Thompson (GBR), Miles Seddon (GBR), Robert Greenhalgh (GBR), Peter Greenhalgh (GBR), Pete Cumming (GBR), Sam Goodchild (GBR), Fletcher Kennedy, Justin Slattery (GBR), Rachel Fallon-Langdon (IRL)		
2h 02m 31s	2016 Sep	Phaedo 3	MOD 70	Brian Thompson (GBR) +Crew		
Female
5h 36m 13s				Anon	Benchmark Time	
Kitesurfer Outright
2h 32m 25s	July 16		"Kitesurf"	Guy Bridge (GBR)		
Kitesurf Women
3h 3m 24s	July 16	"Kitesurf"		Steph Bridge (GBR)		
Monohull
3h 13m 11s	2017-08	"MAPFRE"	Volvo Ocean 65	Xabi Fernandez (ESP)		
Monohull — WSSR Rule 21c
3h 20m 09s	2006-08	"ICAP Maximus"	98 ft Super Maxi	Bill Buckley, Charles, St Clair Brown, Harold Cudmore		
40 ft Singlehanded
5h 05m 04s	2019-12	"Oceans Lab"	Class40	Phil Sharp (GBR)		
6h 29m 32s	2017-01	"Pixel Flyer"	No.112 - Class40	Alex Alley (GBR)		

=== Cowes to Dinard ===
138 nm

Time	Date	Boat	Boat Type	Crew	Notes	Ref.
Outright
4h 30m 48s	2021-04-22	"Maserati"	Tri 70	Giovanni Soldini (ITA); Ambrogio Beccaria, Vittorio Bissaro, Guido Broggi, François Robert, Carlos Hernandez Robayna; Matteo Soldini.		
4h 48m 57s	2015-09	Phaedo 3	MOD 70 Trimaran	Lloyd Thornburg (USA); Brian Thompson (GBR)		
5h 14m 47s	2015-04	"Lending Club"		Laplanche/Breymaier USA		
5h 23m 38s	2002-09	"Maiden II"	Maxi Cat	Brian Thompson (GBR); Helena Darvalid (NOR); Adrienne Cahalan (AUS)		
6h 21m 54s	2001-12	"PlayStation"	Maxi Cat	Steve Fossett (USA)		
6h 49m 19s	1997-10	"Royal Sun Alliance"	Maxi Cat	Tracy Edwards (GBR)		
7h 34m 54s	1997-07	"Primagaz"	ORMA 60 Tri	Laurent Bourgnon (FRA)		
60 ft and under
7h 34m 54s	1997-07	"Primagaz"	ORMA 60 Tri	Laurent Bourgnon (FRA)		
Singlehanded Outright
7h 55m 47s	2006-07	"Sodebo"	Maxi Tri	Thomas Coville (FRA)		
Singlehanded Under 60 ft
9h 03m 06s	2016-11	"Imerys"	Class40	Phil Sharp (GBR)		
Monohull
9h 03m 06s	2016-11	"Imerys"	Class40	Phil Sharp (GBR)		
12h 01m 31s	2004-11	"Adrien"		Jean-Luc Van Den Heede (FRA)		
20 ft Performance
19h 42m 02s	2018-08		Catamaran	Yvan Bourgnon (FRA); Mathis Bourgnon (FRA)		
31h 38m 40s	2006-07	"Aster Wind"		David Leon (FRA)		

=== Plymouth to La Rochelle ===
355 nm

Time	Date	Boat	Boat Type	Crew	Notes	Ref.
Outright
37h 33m 23s	May 1	"Netergy.com"		Pete Berry GBR		
16h 42m 40s	Apr 02	"PlayStation"		Steve Fossett (USA)		
14h 05m 20s	Sep 15	Phaedo 3	MOD 70	Lloyd Thornburg (USA); Brian Thompson (GBR)		

=== (Original) Fastnet Course ===
Cowes, Fastnet Rock, Scilly Isles, Plymouth totaling a rhum line distance of 595 nm

Time	Date	Boat	Boat Type	Crew	Notes	Ref.
Non-stop Crewed
0d 23h 51m 16s	2021-05-07	Maseriti	70 ft Tri - MOD 70	Skipper - Giovanni Soldini (ITA), Guido Broggi, Carlos Hernandez Robayna, Oliver Herrera Perez, Gerardo Siciliano; Matteo Soldini		
1d 01h 04m 18s	2021-04-07	Powerplay	70 ft Tri - MOD 70	Skipper - Ned Collier Wakefield (GBR); Peter Cunningham (GBR); Nav - Miles Seddon (GBR); Helm - Paul Larsen (AUS); Tom Dawson; John Hamilton; Jack Trigger; Miles Seddon; Martin Watts		
1d 03h 42m 26s	2015-09	Phaedo 3	70 ft Tri - MOD 70	Lloyd Thornburg (USA); Brian Thompson (GBR) +Crew		
1d 08h 48m 46s	2011-08	"Banque Populaire V"	125 ft Tri	Loick Peyron (FRA) +Crew		
1d 11h 17m 14s	2002-03	"PlayStation"	124 ft Cat	Steve Fossett (USA) +Crew		
Monohull
1d 20h 18m 53s	2007-08	"Leopard"	Farr 100 Maxi	Mike Slade (GBR) +Crew		
1d 18h 38m	2011-08	"Abu Dhabi"	Volvo Ocean 70	Ian Walker (GBR) +Crew		

== America's ==
=== New York to San Francisco via Cape Horn ===
13225 nm

Time	Date	Boat	Boat Type	Crew	Notes	Ref.
Outright
89d 21h	1851	"Flying Cloud"		Capt Josiah Perkins Creesy USA	Pre-WSSR rules	
89d 8h	1854	"Flying Cloud"		Capt Josiah Perkins Creesy USA	Pre-WSSR rules	
80d 20h	1989	"Thursday's Child"		Warren Luhrs USA	Pre-WSSR rules	
76d 23h	1989	"Great American"		Georgs Kolesnikova USA	Pre-WSSR rules	
62d 5h 55m	1994	"Ecureuil Poitou		Isabelle Autissier FRA	Pre-WSSR rules	
57d 3h 2m	1998	Aquitaine Innovations		Yves Parlier FRA	Pre-WSSR rules	
43d 3m 18s	2008 Feb	Gitana 13		Lionel Lemonchois FRA		
Monohull
47d 42m 29s	Feb 13	Maserati	Volvo Ocean 70	Giovanni Soldini ITA		

=== Miami to New York ===
947nm

Time	Date	Boat	Boat Type	Crew	Notes	Ref.
Outright
1d 11h 5m 20s	2007 Jun	"Groupama 3"		Franck Cammas (FRA)		
2d 5h 54m 42s	2001 May	"PlayStation"		Steve Fossett (USA)		
2d 22h 50m 16s	1999 May	"Explorer"		Cam Lewis (USA); Loic Peyron (FRA)		
Singlehanded
3d 5h 0m 12s	2005 Jul	"Sodebo"		Thomas Coville (FRA)		

=== Antigua to Newport. R I ===
1560 nm

Time	Date	Boat	Boat Type	Crew	Notes	Ref.
Outright
3d 22h 31m 58s	May 2	"Maiden II" Initial time		Adrienne Cahalan Helena Darvelid,		
3d 05h 54m 49s	May 15	Phaedo 3	MOD 70	Lloyd Thornburg (USA)		

=== Chicago to Mackinac ===
289 nm

Time	Date	Boat	Boat Type	Crew	Notes	Ref.
Outright
17h 59m 49s	Oct 17	Il Mostro	Volvo Ocean 70	Peter Thornton USA		

=== Newport to Bermuda ===
635 nm

Time	Date	Boat	Boat Type	Crew	Notes	Ref.
Outright
0d 23h 09m 52s	2015-04-20	"Lending Club"	105 ft Tri	Co-skippers Renaud Laplanche (FRA) (USA); Co-skippers Ryan Breymaier (USA), Navigator Boris Herrmann (GER), Captain Jan Majer (USA), Roland Jourdain (FRA), Jean-Baptiste Le Vaillant (FRA), Stanislas Delbarre (FRA), Quin Bisset (NZL)		
1d 14h 35m 53s	Jan 00	"PlayStation"		Steve Fossett (USA)		
1d 16h 52m 24s	Jun 99	"Lacota"		Steve Fossett (USA)		
Singlehanded
1d 16h 52m 24s	Jun 99	"Lacota"		Steve Fossett (USA)		
Monohull
2d 28m 31s	Jun 04	"Morning Glory"		Hasso Platner GER		

== Asia ==
=== Yokohama to Hong Kong ===
1545 nm

Time	Date	Boat	Boat Type	Crew	Notes	Ref.
Outright
4d 17h 47m 23s	May 6	"Geronimo"		Olivier de Kersauson FRA		

=== Taipei to Hong Kong ===
465 nm

Time	Date	Boat	Boat Type	Crew	Notes	Ref.
Outright
2d 16h 46m 32s	Apr 06	"B&Q"		Ellen MacArthur GBR		
2d 15h 40m 42s	Dec 06	"Johan II"		Philippe Grelon FRA		
24h 45m 59s	May 8	"Gitana 13		Lionel Lemonchois FRA		
Monohull
2d 15h 40m 42s	Dec 06	"Johan II"		Philippe Grelon FRA		

== Mediterranean ==
=== Marseilles to Carthage ===
455 nm

Time	Date	Boat	Boat Type	Crew	Notes	Ref.
Outright
14h 20m 34s	2010-05	Banque Populaire V	125 ft Tri	Pascal Bidgorry (FRA); Crew		
17h 8m 23s	2009-05	"Groupama 3"	Maxi Tri	Franck Cammas (FRA); Crew		
17h 56m 33s	2004-09	Orange II	Maxi Cat	Bruno Peyron (FRA); Crew		
18h 46m 48s	2002-05	PlayStation	124 ft Cat	Steve Fossett (USA); Crew		
Singlehanded
18h 58m 13s	2013-10	"Banque Populaire 7"	103 ft Tri	Armel Le Cleac'h (FRA)		
1d 1h 38m 36s	2012-09	"Sodebo"		Thomas Coville (FRA)		
1d 21h 20m 29s	2009-06	"Group Bel"	IMOCA 60	Kito de Pavant (FRA)		
Monohull
1d 02h 43m 30s	2013-06	"Groupe Bel"	IMOCA 60	Kito de Pavant (FRA) + Crew		
1d 05h 02m 06s	1998-09	"Stealth"	Maxi Mono	Giovanni Angeli (ITA) + Crew		
Singlehanded 60 ft
1d 02h 43m 30s	2013-06	"Groupe Bel"	IMOCA 60	Kito de Pavant (FRA)		
1d 21h 20m 29s	2009-06	"Groupe Bel"	IMOCA 60	Kito de Pavant (FRA)		
Up to 40 ft
1d 11h 35m 23s	2010-06	"ZED 4"		Gerald Bibot (BEL)		
1d 21h 24m	2008-03	"Roaring Forty"		Michel Kleinjans (BEL)		
20 ft Performance
1d 18h 56m 14s	2018-07		Catamaran	Yvan Bourgnon (FRA); Mathis Bourgnon (FRA)		
1d 18h 58m 19s	2016-08	"Feel Good"		Vittorio Mailingri (ITA); Nico Mailingri (ITA)		

=== Trieste to Malta ===
740 nm

Time	Date	Boat	Boat Type	Crew	Notes	Ref.
Outright
2d 20h 42m 24s	Oct 12	"Esmit Europa 2"		Jochen Schumann GER	Benchmark Time	

=== Monaco to Porto Cervo ===
195 nm

Time	Date	Boat	Boat Type	Crew	Notes	Ref.
Outright
7h 53m 31s	Nov 16	Phaedo 3	MOD 70	Brian Thompson (GBR)		

== Oceanian ==
=== Round Australia ===
Time	Date	Boat	Boat Type	Crew	Notes	Ref.
Non-stop Crewed
17d 12h 57m 5s	July 2005	Geronimo	T 90	Olivier de Kersauson FRA		
Non-stop Solo
38d 21h 41m 42s	Aug -11	Big Wave Rider	C (1) 46	Bruce Arms AUS		
Non-stop Monohull
37d 1h 23m 57s	Jul-03	52	David PescudAUS			

=== Sydney to Hobart ===
630 nm

Time	Date	Boat	Boat Type	Crew	Notes	Ref.
Outright
1d 5h 52m 23s	Feb 13	"Team Australia"		Sean Langman AUS		
1d 18h 27m 10s	Dec 99	"MariCha III"		Robert Miller GBR		

=== Sydney to Lord Howe Island ===
408 nm

Time	Date	Boat	Boat Type	Crew	Notes	Ref.
Outright
1d 03h 45m 46s	Jul 04	"Raw Nerve"		Martyn Riley AUS		

=== Sydney to Auckland ===
1265 nm

Time	Date	Boat	Boat Type	Crew	Notes	Ref.
Outright
2d 19h 2m 45s	Oct 13	Team Australia		Sean Langman (AUS)		
40 ft Singlehanded
12d 14h 41m 15s	Feb 20	"Joey"		James Prascevic (AUS)	Initial Benchmark	

== Pacific Records ==
=== Transpacific, Los Angeles to Honolulu ===
2215 nm

Time	Date	Boat	Boat Type	Crew	Notes	Ref.
Outright
5d 9h 18m 26s	Jul 97	"Explorer"		Bruno Peyron FRA		
4d 19h 31m 37s	Nov 05	"Geronimo"		Olivier de Kersauson FRA		
3d 18h 9s	Jul 15	"Lending Club 2"		Laplanche/Breymaier USA		
3d 16h 52m 3s	May 17	Phaedo 3	MOD 70	Lloyd Thornburg (USA); Brian Thompson (GBR)		

=== Honolulu to Yokohama ===
3750 nm

Time	Date	Boat	Boat Type	Crew	Notes	Ref.
Outright
13d 20h 9m 22s	Jul 95	"Lacota"		Steve Fossett (USA)		
Rule 21c – Powered Sailing Systems
15d 3h 36m 18s	Jul 06	"BeeCom"		Yoshiki Kamai JPN		

=== Yokohama to San Francisco ===
4482 nm

Time	Date	Boat	Boat Type	Crew	Notes	Ref.
Outright
16d 17h 21m	Aug 95	"Lacota"		Steve Fossett (USA)		
14d 17h 22m 50s	Aug 98	"Explorer"		Bruno Peyron FRA		
13d 22h 38m 28s	Jun 06	"Geronimo"		Olivier de Kersauson FRA		
Singlehanded
20d 9h 52m 59s	Aug 96	"Lacota"		Steve Fossett (USA)		
20 ft Sport
62d 17h 51m 55s	Aug 06	"One World"		A Di Benedetto ITA		

=== San Francisco to Yokohama ===
4482 nm

Time	Date	Boat	Boat Type	Crew	Notes	Ref.
Outright
19d 15h 18m 9s	Apr 96	"Lacota"		Steve Fossett (USA)		
14d 22h 40m 41s	Apr 06	"Geronimo"		Olivier de Kersauson FRA		
11d 12m 54s	Apr 08	"Gitana 13"		Lionel Lemonchois FRA		

=== Hong Kong to New York ===
13707 nm

Time	Date	Boat	Boat Type	Crew	Notes	Ref.
Outright
72d 21h 11m 37s	May 3	"Great American II"		Rich Wilson USA		

== See also ==
- World Sailing Speed Record Council
- Speed sailing
- Speed sailing record
- Transatlantic sailing record

== External links and references ==
- WSSRC
