= Transatlantic sailing record =

Fastest boat voyage between Europe/Africa and the Americas

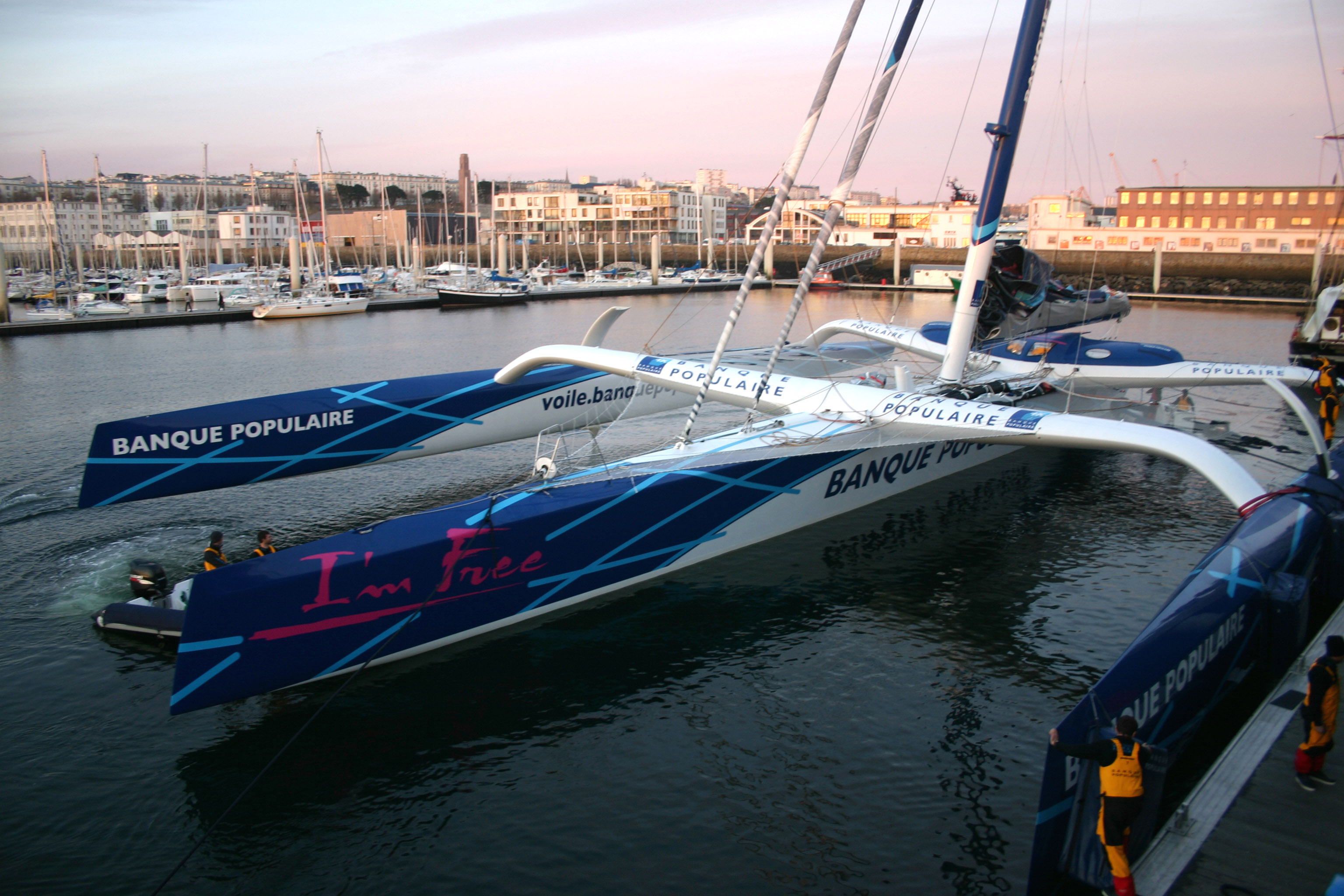
Banque Populaire V, current record holder

Since the five-week voyage of Christopher Columbus in 1492, quickly and safely crossing the Atlantic Ocean between Europe and the Americas has always been an important issue. Today, the route has become a classic one among skippers. The record is one of the most prestigious, next to the Jules Verne Trophy, for which it is often a good preparation.

This record can be achieved both ways: from west to east or from east to west. It can also be done single-handed or crewed, on monohulls or on multihulls. Since 1972, the official record has been handed out by the WSSRC

== From west to east ==
This route is the fastest, as it follows the prevailing westerlies. It is the one that meets the most interest among skippers. The crossing must be made from Ambrose Light of New York to an imaginary line linking Lizard Point, Cornwall to Ushant. The distance is around 2,880 nautical miles (5,330 km; 3,310 mi).

=== Crewed ===
Time	Yacht	Skipper	Crew	Date	Average speed
12d 04h 01m 19s	(United States) Atlantic	Charlie Barr		1905	10.20 knots (18.89 km/h)
10d 05h 14m 20s [Multihull]	(France) Paul Ricard (trimaran)	Éric Tabarly	Éric Bourhis, Georges Calvé, Dominique Pipat	1980	12.15 knots (22.50 km/h)
9d 10h 06m 34s	(France) Elf Aquitaine	Marc Pajot		1981	13.18 knots (24.41 km/h)
08d 16h 36m	(France) Jet Services 2	Patrick Morvan	Jean Le Cam, Marc Guillemot, (Serge Madec)	1984	14.29 knots (26.47 km/h)
07d 21h 05m 42s	(France) Royale 2	Loïc Caradec		1985	15.76 knots (29.19 km/h)
07d 12h 49m 34s	(France) Fleury Michon VIII	Philippe Poupon		1987	16.48 knots (30.52 km/h)
07d 06h 32m	(France) Jet Service V	Serge Madec	Marc Guillemot	1988	17.07 knots (31.61 km/h)
6d 13h 03m 32s	(France) Jet Service V	Serge Madec		1990	18.97 knots (35.13 km/h)
6d 17h 52m 39s	Mari-Cha IV	Robert Miller		2003	
4d 17h 28m 6s [Catamaran]	PlayStation	Steve Fossett (USA)	Stan Honey (USA), Ben Wright, Dave Scully, Gino Morrelli, Peter Hogg, Shaun Biddulph, Dave Calvert, Paul Van Dyke, David Weir	2001	26.26 knots (48.63 km/h)
4d 08h 23m 54s	Orange II	Bruno Peyron (FRA)	Roger Nilson (SWE), Bernard Stamm (SUI), Ludovic Aglaor, Florent Chastel, Pascal Bidégorry, Jacques Caraes (FRA), Ronan Le Goff, Jean-Baptiste Epron, Yann Guichard, Clément Surtel, Jean-Baptiste Le Vaillant	2006	28.54 knots (52.86 km/h)
4d 03h 57m 54s	Groupama 3	Franck Cammas (FRA)	Franck Proffit (FRA), Stève Ravussin (SUI), Frédéric Le Peutrec (FRA), Sébastien Audigane (FRA), Yann Guichard (FRA), Ronan Le Goff (FRA), Bruno Jeanjean (FRA), Loïc Le Mignon (FRA), Pascal Blouin (FRA)	2007	29.81 knots (55.21 km/h)
3d 15h 25min 48s	Banque Populaire V (fastest multihull)	Pascal Bidégorry (FRA)	Ronan Lucas (FRA), Kévin Escoffier (FRA), Yvan Ravussin (SUI), Ewen Le Clech (FRA), Sébastien Audigane, Florent Chastel, Jean-Baptiste Le Vaillant, Emmanuel Le Borgne, Marcel Van Triest, Pierre-Yves Moreau, Xavier Revil	2009	32.94 knots (61.00 km/h)
Monohull
5d 14h 21min 25s	Comanche (fastest monohull)	Casey Smith (AUS)	Stan Honey (USA), Tony Mutter (USA), Dirk de Ridder (NED), Robert Greenhalgh (GBR), Shannon Falcone (USA), Yann Riou (FRA), Chris Maxted, Jon von Schwarz, Juggy Clougher, Julien Cressant, Nick Dana, Pablo Arrarte (ESP), Pepe Ribes, Peter van Niekerk, Phil Harmer, Richard Clarke	2016	21.44 knots (39.71 km/h)

=== Single-handed ===
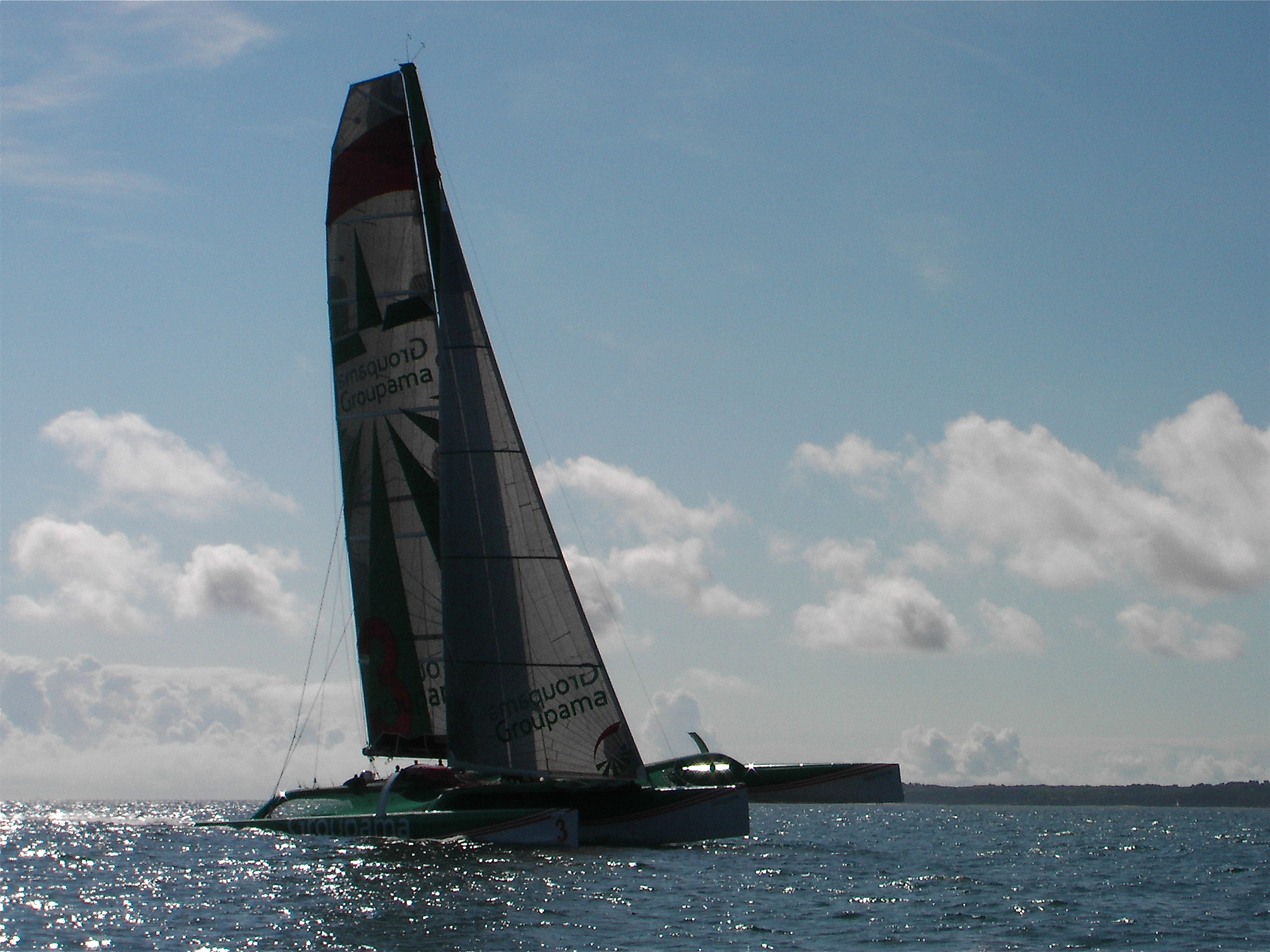
Groupama 3, previous record holder for both directions, from east to west and west to east, both crewed and singlehandedly under the name of IDEC Sport

Time	Yacht	Skipper	Date	Average speed
11d 11h 46m 36s	(France) Explorer	Bruno Peyron	1987	
9d 21h 42m	(France) Pierre 1er	Florence Arthaud	1990	
9d 19h 22m	(France) Explorer	Bruno Peyron	July 1992	
7d 02h 34m 42s	(France) Primagaz	Laurent Bourgnon	June 1994	17.47 knots (32.35 km/h)
6d 04h 01m 37s	(France) IDEC	Francis Joyon	6 July 2005	19.75 knots (36.58 km/h)
5d 19h 29m 20s	(France) Sodebo	Thomas Coville	15 July 2008	24.72 knots (45.78 km/h)
5d 02h 56m 10s	(France) IDEC 2	Francis Joyon	16 June 2013	27.47 knots (50.87 km/h)
5d 02h 07m	(France) IDEC Sport	Francis Joyon	13 July 2017	27.65 knots (51.21 km/h)
4d 11h 10m 23s	(France) Sodebo Ultim	Thomas Coville	15 July 2017	28.35 knots (52.50 km/h)

== From east to west ==
This crossing is made between Cádiz and San Salvador Island, for a distance of 3,884 nautical miles (7,193 km). It was also called Route of the discovery in honor of Christopher Columbus and his 1492 crossing.

=== Crewed ===
Time	Date	Boat	Boat Type	Crew	Notes	Ref.
Outright
12d 12h 30m 27s	1988	Jet Service V		Skipper - Serge Madec (FRA), Marc Guillemot (FRA), Olivier Despaignes (FRA), Gerry Roufs (FRA), Jean-Yves Bernot (FRA)	14.91 knots (27.61 km/h)	
10d 14h 53m 44s	2000	(New Zealand) Club Med		Skipper - Grant Dalton (NZL), Franck Proffit, Bruno Peyron (FRA)	17.58 knots (32.56 km/h)	
9d 13h 30m 18s	2003	(United States) PlayStation		Skipper - Steve Fossett (USA), Dave Scully, Pete Melvin, Brian Thompson (GBR), Peter Hogg, Mark Featherstone, Dave Calvert, Mikaela Von Koskull, Will Howden, Tim Zimmermann, Nick Leggatt, Simon Fisher, Dave Thomson	16.92 knots (31.34 km/h)	
7d 10h 58min 53s	2007	(France) Groupama 3		Skipper - Franck Cammas (FRA), Franck Proffit (FRA), Stève Ravussin (SUI), Pascal Blouin, Loic Le Mignon, Bruno Jeanjean, Sébastien Audigane, Frédéric Le Peutrec, Ronan Le Goff, Marcel Van Triest (NED)	21.70 knots (40.19 km/h)	
6d 14h 29m 21s	2013	Spindrift 2		Skipper - Dona Bertarelli (SUI); Co-Skipper - Yann Guichard (FRA); Xavier Revil, Jean Baptiste Le Vaillant, Antoine Carraz, Thierry Douillard, Christophe Espagnon, Sébastien Marsset, Nicolas Texier, Erwan Tabarly, François Morvan, Thomas Rouxel, Simone Gaeta, Erwan Israel	24.50 knots (45.37 km/h)	
Singlehanded
6d 23h 42m 18s	Jan 14	Banque Populaire VII		Armel Le Cleac'h (FRA)	23.16 knots (42.89 km/h)	
8d 16h 07m 05s	2013-02-15	IDEC 2		Francis Joyon (FRA)	18.66 knots (34.56 km/h)	
9d 20h 32m 23s	2008-11-07	IDEC 2		Francis Joyon (FRA)	16.42 knots (30.41 km/h)	
10d 11h 50m 46s	2005-07-08	"Sodebo"		Thomas Coville (FRA)	15.42 knots (28.56 km/h)	
11d 3h 17m 20s	Nov 04	"Idec"		Francis Joyon (FRA)	14.53 knots (26.91 km/h)	
Multi 70 trimaran
10d 23h 9m 39s	Feb 11	"Maserati"		Giovanni Soldini ITA		
60 ft. Monohull
11d 08h 55m 29s	Mar 19	"Arkea Paprec"		Simon Sebastien FRA		
40 ft. Monohull
18d 22h 27m 28s	12 Apr 2026	"Waypoint"		Juan Merediz (ESP), Francisco Alarcón (ESP), Fernando Mas (ESP).	8.55 knots (15.83 km/h)	
21d 11h 18m 25s	19 Mar 2015	"Calaluna"		Sergio Frattaruolo (ITA), Alexander Sachs (USA), Alessandro Drago (ITA), Simone De Lorentiis (ITA), Pierpaolo Ballerini (ITA).	7.54 knots (13.96 km/h)	

== Bermuda to Plymouth ==
2,870 nautical miles

Time	Date	Boat	Boat Type	Crew	Notes	Ref.
Outright
5d 11h 57m 17s	May 16	Phaedo 3		Lloyd Thornburg USA		
14d 06h 12m 50s	Aug 04	"Mollymawk"		Ross Hobson GBR		
Monohull
13d 05h 19m 38s	June 17	Talanta		Mikael Ryking/Irina Gracheva SWE/RUS		

== Dakar to Guadeloupe ==
2,551 nautical miles

Time	Date	Boat	Boat Type	Crew	Notes	Ref.
Open 20ft
11d 01h 09m 30s	Apr 17	Feel Good		Vittorio and Nico Malingri ITA		
11d 11h 25m 42s	Dec 07	Ocean Express		Lequin/Moreau FRA		

== Plymouth to Newport ==
2,800 nautical miles

Time	Date	Boat	Boat Type	Crew	Notes	Ref.
Outright
9d 08h 05m 20s	Jun 94	"Primagaz"		Laurent Bourgnon FRA		
Singlehanded
9d 23h 54m 36s	Jun 00	"Eure et Loire"		Francis Joyon FRA		
Female
14d 23h 11m	Jun 00	"Kingfisher"		Ellen MacArthur GBR		
Monohull
13d 12h 47m	Jun 12	"Vento Di Sardegna"		Andrea Mura ITA		

== See also ==
- Blue Riband
- Passage sailing record
- Single-Handed Trans-Atlantic Race
- Speed sailing record
- Transatlantic crossing
- World Sailing Speed Record Council
