= Pascal Bidégorry =

French sailor

Pascal Bidegorry
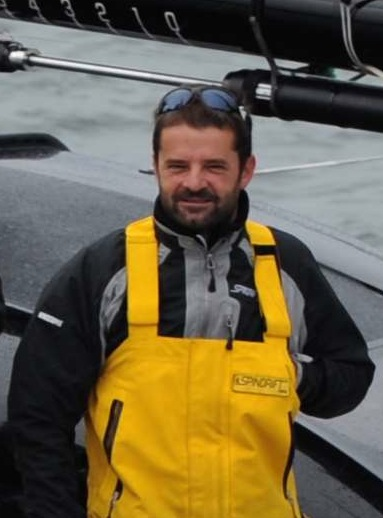
- Pascal Bidegorry in 2012

Personal information
- Nationality: French
- Born: 15 January 1968 (age 58) Bayonne, Pays Basque

Sailing career
- Sport: Sailing

Pascal Bidegorry (born 15 January 1968, in Bayonne) is a French sailor.

== Life ==
He has raced across the Atlantic Ocean over 30 times and has set records in many classes. He has won the Solitaire du Figaro and the Transat Jacques Vabre; apart from several championships in the ORMA, IMOCA, MOD 70 and Décision 35 circuits. Besides, he has six French and World Championship titles under his belt.

He joined Team Banque Populaire in 2004 as skipper of the Banque Populaire III trimaran. From February 2010 to April 2011, he was skipper of Banque Populaire V, the world's largest ocean racing trimaran at 40 metres (130 ft) in length and campaigned the yacht in breaking ocean racing records.

He was the navigator onboard Dongfeng Race Team in the 2014–15 Volvo Ocean Race, and again in the 2017–18 Volvo Ocean Race, when Dongfeng won the race by just 30 minutes at the end of the final leg, having not won a single leg beforehand, following a three-way tie with Team Brunel and MAPFRE.

He was co-skipper of the 100 ft trimaran MACIF in the 2015 Transat Jacques Vabre, together with Francois Gabart. They won the race from Le Havre (France) to Itajaí (Brazil) after 12 days 17hrs 29min 27sec sailing at an average speed of 17.68 knots for the theoretical course of 5,400 nm (10,000 km).

== Sailing career ==
- 2000:
  - Winner Solitaire du Figaro
  - 2nd French Championship single-handed.
  - 3rd Transat Ag2r. Winner of the first leg.
- 2001:
  - 3rd Tour de France à la voile
  - Winner multihull world championship
  - Winner French Mumm30 championship
- 2002:
  - 2nd Tour de France à la voile
  - Winner Grand Prix de Fécamp ORMA 60
  - Winner Grand Prix de Lorient ORMA 60
  - Winner French Figaro championship (crewed)
  - Participation in the Volvo Ocean Race (Auckland/Rio) on SEB
- 2003:
  - 4th Solitaire du Figaro
  - 6th Transat Jacques Vabre
- 2004:
  - 2nd Transat Ag2r
- 2005:
  - Winner 2005 Transat Jacques Vabre on ORMA 60 ft (18 m) multihull.
  - Winner IB Group Challenge (Lorient – Nice).
- 2006:
  - 2nd Route du Rhum, in the ORMA 60 multihulls
- 2007:
  - 3rd Transat Jacques Vabre in ORMA 60. Set speed record for 60 foot multihull with 667 nm in 24 hours
- 2009:
  - Transatlantic record W to E, Ambrose Light – Lizard Point (crewed), as skipper on Banque Populaire V, in 3 days, 15 hours, 25 minutes and 48 seconds, with an average speed of 32.94 knots (61.00 km/h).
  - 24 hours distance record as skipper on 131 ft trimaran Banque Populaire V, with a day's run of 908.2 nautical miles (1,682.0 km) at an average speed of 37.84 knots (70.08 km/h).
- 2010:
  - Marseille to Carthage record (455 nm), as skipper on Banque Populaire V, in 14h 20m and 34s at an average speed of 32 knots.
- 2011:
  - Attempt at the Trophée Jules Verne with the Maxi Banque Populaire V
- 2012:
  - 1st in Spi Ouest France on Safran
  - 1st in the Krys Ocean Race on the MOD 70 Spindrift Racing
  - Winner Multi One Championship (MOD 70)
  - 2nd in the Tour of Europe (MOD 70)
- 2013:
  - 2nd Transat Jacques Vabre, on IMOCA 60 Safran with Marc Guillemot.
- 2014 – 2015:
  - 3rd 2014–15 Volvo Ocean Race, with Dongfeng Race Team, as navigator.
- 2015:
  - Winner Transat Jacques Vabre, with François Gabart on 100 ft trimaran MACIF.
