= Dona Bertarelli =

Swiss businesswoman (born 1968)

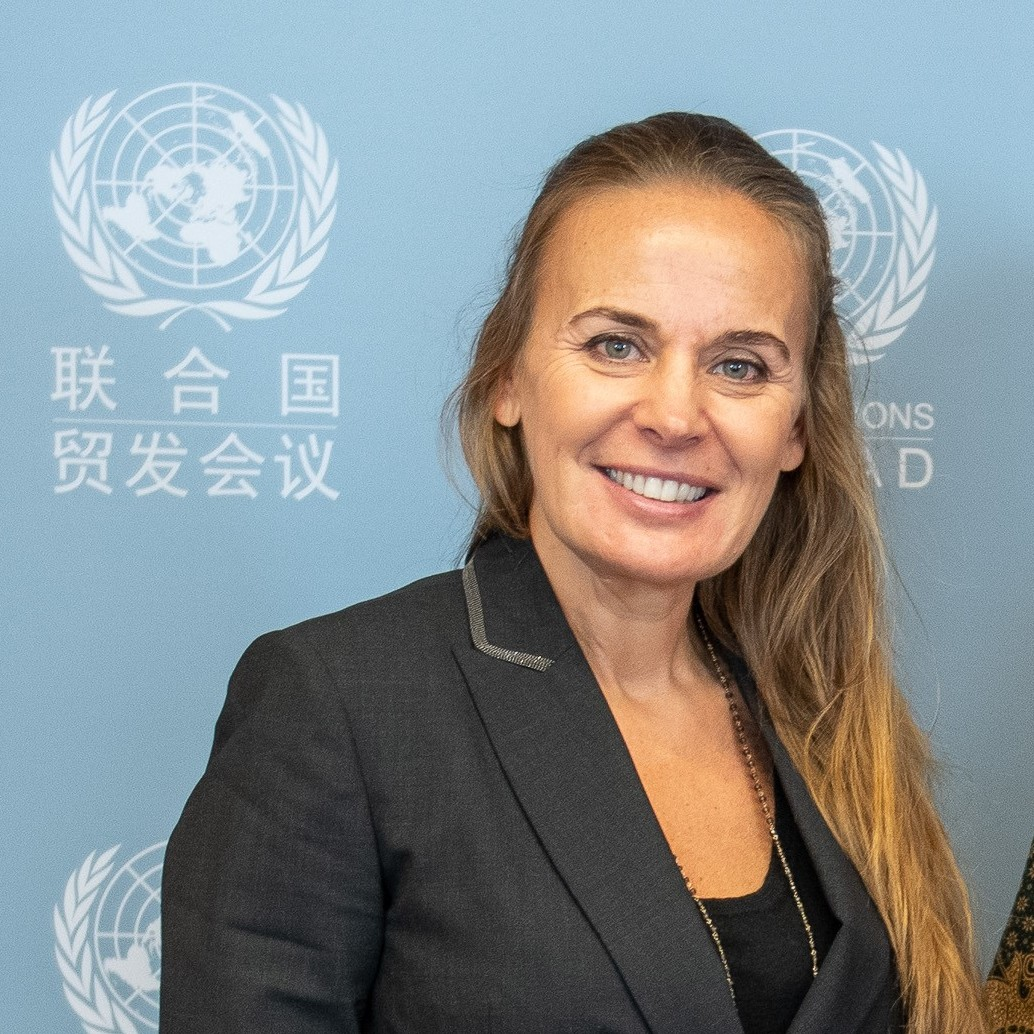
- Bertarelli in 2018
- Born: 3 March 1968 (age 58); Rome, Italy
- Other name: Donata
- Citizenship: Swiss
- Occupations: Businessperson, sailor
- Spouse: Yann Guichard
- Children: 3
- Relatives: Ernesto Bertarelli (brother)
- Website: donabertarelli.com

Dona Bertarelli (Note: also known as Donata Guichard Bertarelli, Donata Bertarelli Späth, and Donata Bertarelli Spaeth.) (born 1968) is a Swiss entrepreneur, philanthropist and ocean advocate. She is co-chair of the Bertarelli Foundation, founder of Sails of Change, co-founder of the Pew Bertarelli Ocean Legacy and founder of Global Fishing Watch Marine Manager. She is a Patron of Nature of the IUCN. As a sailor, she is the winner of the 2010 and 2014 Bol d'Or Mirabaud and, with her team Spindrift Racing, the Fastnet Race in 2013. In the same year, she and her team also broke the record for the America Discovery Route. In the winter 2016 she completed the Jules Verne Trophy challenge.

In 2023, she was distinguished as a Knight of the National Order of the Legion of Honour of France and as a Commander of the national Order of Honorato Vásquez of Ecuador.

== Early life and education ==
Bertarelli was born in Rome on 3 March 1968. She is the daughter of Maria Iris Bertarelli and Fabio Bertarelli. She and her brother Ernesto inherited Serono, a biotechnology company. Serono was founded in 1906 in Rome and was the building block of the family's wealth. The family now has several activities and investments, with interests in areas such as finance, real estate, health, sports, hospitality or agriculture. According to Forbes magazine, she is ranked as the 486th wealthiest person in the world with an estimated net worth of $6.2 billion, as of June 2024.

Bertarelli has a BSc from Boston University's College of Communication.

== Business ==
Bertarelli was active in Serono, the family business, and from 1992 to 1997 was Executive Director, Public and Professional Affairs, where she established the Serono Symposia and the Serono Foundation. The company was sold to Merck KGaA at the beginning of 2007.

The five-star Grand Hôtel Park in Gstaad was taken over by Bertarelli in 2003. In January 2025, it was announced the hotel would be managed by Four Seasons after a complete renovation.

She became a special adviser to UNCTAD in June 2020.

In late 2022, Bertarelli acquired Italian fashion brand Fiorucci.

Bertarelli was Executive Producer for the environmental documentary Deep Rising, which was released in 2023.

In May 2025, Aman Resorts announced the launch of Amancaya, its first resort in The Bahamas, in partnership with Bertarelli, and investment firm Squircle Capital.

== Philanthropy ==
After her father died, in 1999 Bertarelli and her brother founded the Bertarelli Foundation to promote the sharing and development of scientific, social and economic knowledge in the field of infertility. For ten years, Bertarelli was Chairman of the Foundation.

An article on the need for blue recovery sustainability, for which Bertarelli was co-author, was published in July 2020. Mukhisa Kituyi, Secretary-General of UNCTAD and Berarelli encouraged countries to explore and expand the blue economy. In November 2020, Bertarelli praised the decision to protect the waters of the archipelago, which was made by the Island Council of Tristan da Cunha.

In 2021, the Bertarelli Rare Cancers Fund supported USD 15 million in research projects and community building. In October 2022, Bertarelli launched the Sports for Nature partnership with the International Union for Conservation of Nature to raise awareness for the protection of environment through the sporting community.

Bertarelli is an ambassador for the Swiss transfusion charity Ma Vie Ton Sang and is a supporter of the World Health Organization's ‘Go Red for Women' campaign. She is also a godmother to the Womanity charity (formerly Smiling Children).

In April 2024, Bertarelli, together with other organizations and private funders, pledged USD 60.8 million to protect the Mediterranean Sea.

== Sailing ==
Bertarelli is an avid sailor and since 2007 has raced with her team, Spindrift Racing, in the monotype multihull regattas on Lake Léman with her Décision 35 catamaran, Ladycat. Bertarelli and her team won the Bol d'Or Mirabaud in 2010. Bertarelli was the first helmswoman to win this race since its inception in 1939.

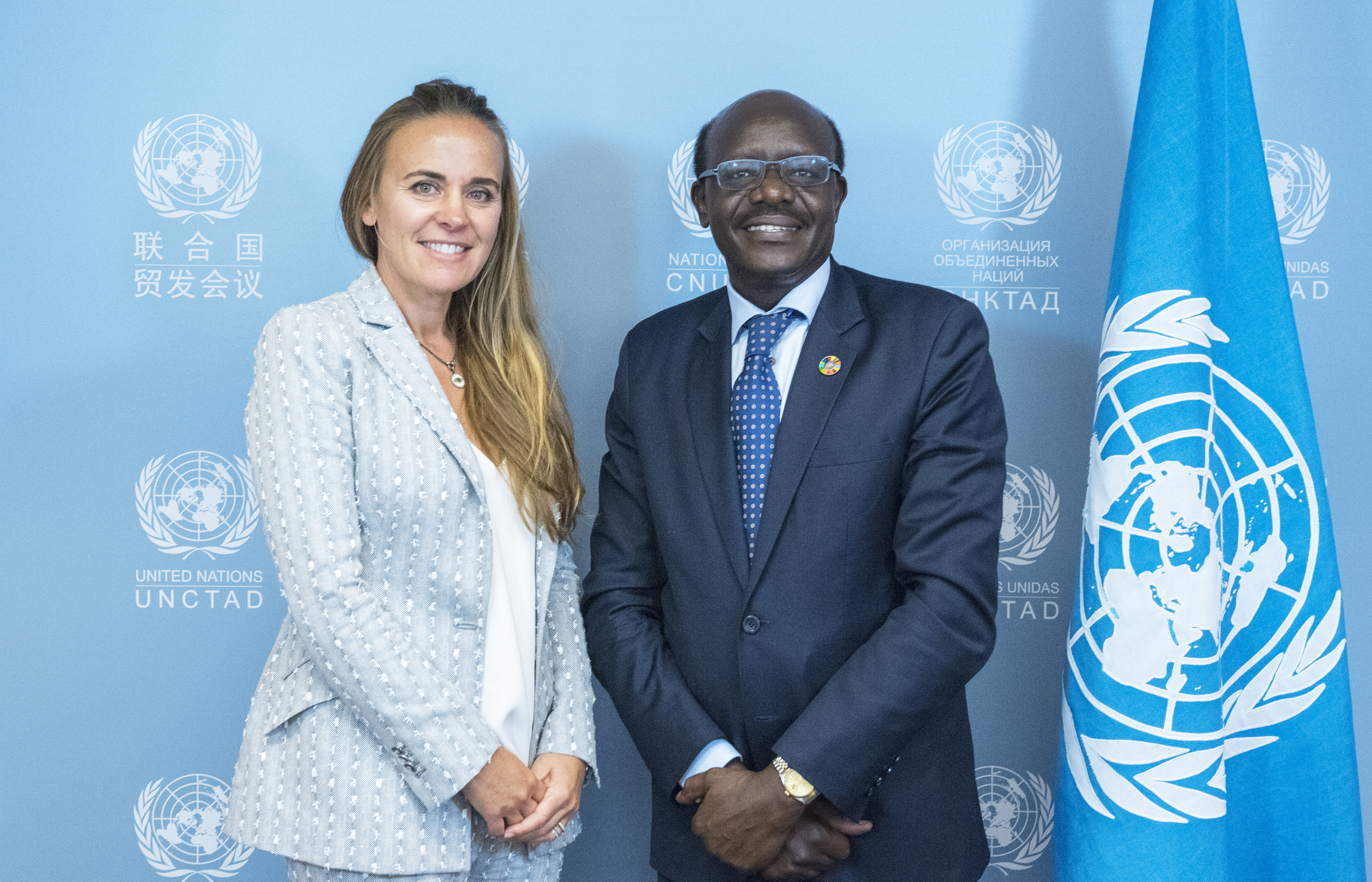
Special adviser to UNCTAD Dona Bertarelli and Mukhisa Kituyi of UNCTAD

In January 2013, Bertarelli bought a Maxi Trimaran called Maxi Banque Populaire V for her Spindrift racing team. In the same year, and with the boat now named Maxi Spindrift 2, she co-skippered the team to victory in the 45th Rolex Fastnet and also set a new record for the America Discovery Route, beating the time set by Franck Cammas in 2007 by more than 20 hours.

In August 2015, Dona Bertarelli's Spindrift 2 defended her title by taking line honors at the 46th Rolex Fastnet race. Later that year, on 22 November, Bertarelli, with Yann Guichard and their crew, left Ushant (a French island off the northwest corner of Brittany) on Spindrift 2, attempting to break the record for a crewed non-stop circumnavigation (the Jules Verne Trophy). While they did not break the record, Bertarelli became the fastest woman to sail around the world.

In November 2021, Bertarelli and Guichard and their crew set off on their maxi-trimaran Sails of Change from La Trinite-sur-Mer in south-west Brittany being on stand-by to start their attempt to break the 2017 Jules Verne Trophy record of Francis Joyon. They used the occasion to promote the 30 by 30 campaign aiming to protect 30 per cent of the planet by 2030. However, in February 2022, Bertarelli and Guichard were forced to abandon their plans for their fourth attempt due to unfavourable weather conditions over the winter. This did not hinder them and their Spindrift Crew to pursue an ambitious year of record breaking attempts during 2022, and Bertarelli addressing One Ocean Summit delegates appealing again for the protection of at least 30% of the planet by 2030. In October 2022, Bertarelli and Guichard put their crew on standby again for their renewed record breaking attempt of the Jules Verne Trophy, the fastest non-stop and unassisted circumnavigation of the world.

== Publications ==
- 22 March 2021 – Op-ed: The blue economy is an ocean of opportunity to advance gender equality
- 26 August 2022 – Op-ed: It's High Time to Protect Our High Seas
- 24 October 2022 – Op-ed: To protect the Southern Ocean, leaders must act now (commentary)
