= IMOCA 60 Oceans Lab =

Oceanslab
Development
- Designer: Sam Manuard
- Year: 2023-10-22
- Builders: Pauger Composites (HUN) & Black Pepper Yachts
- Name: Oceanslab

Hull appendages
- General: two rudders, two foils
- Keel: canting keel

Racing
- Class association: IMOCA 60

Oceanslab is an IMOCA 60 monohull sailing yacht designed by Sam Manuard and constructed by Pauger Composites in Hungary and Black Pepper Yachts in France. It was launched on 22 October 2023. It is designed for the Vendée Globe 2024, a solo tour of the world. Its skipper is the British Phil Sharp.

== Design ==
IMOCA 60 Oceans Lab is the sistership to L’Occitane and Initiatives-Cœur 4.

Unlike other IMOCAs, Oceanslab is powered by fuel cells rather than a combustion engine.
