= Banque Populaire V =

Racing trimaran sailboat, AKA Spindrift 2

Spindrift 2 Banque Populaire V
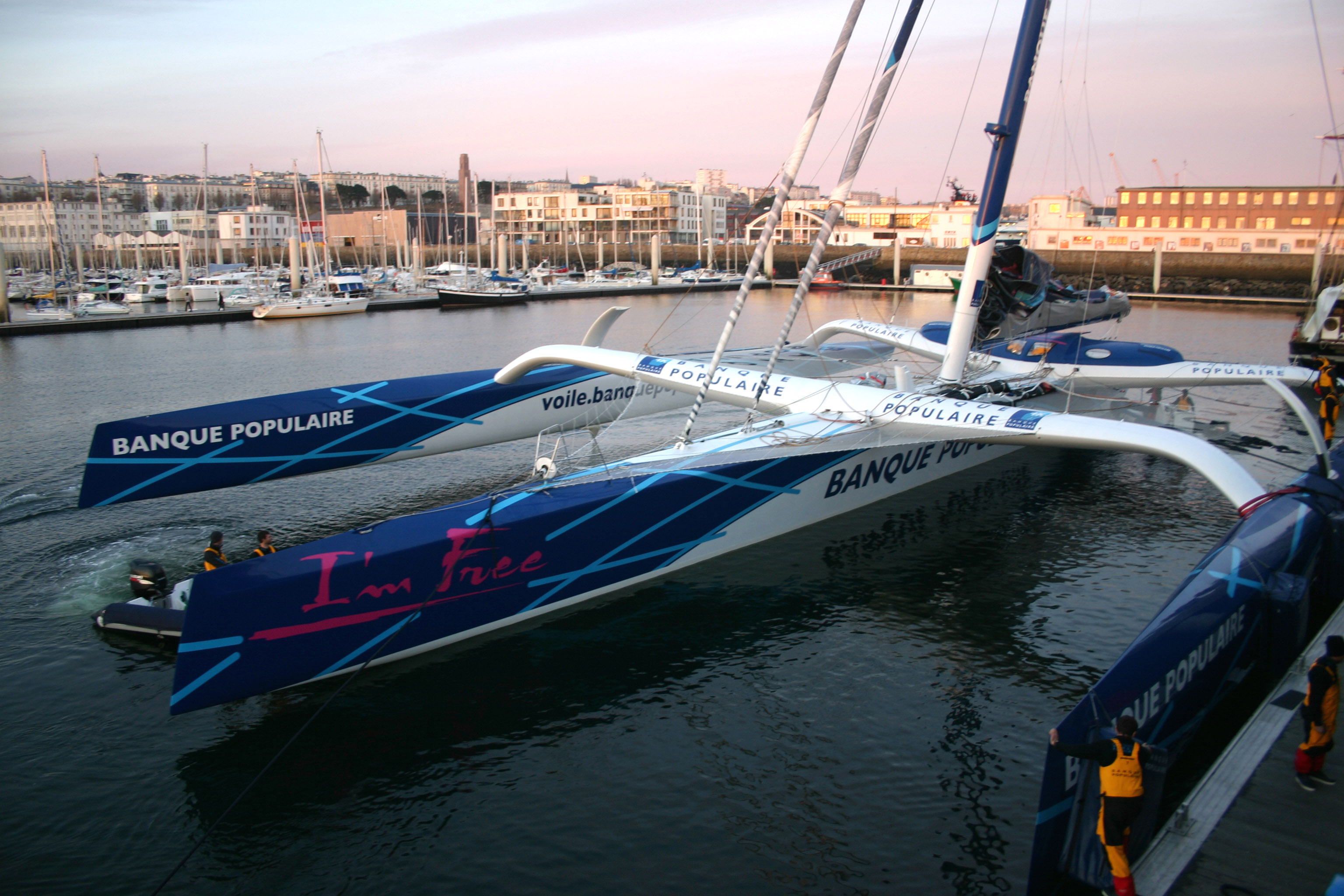
- Banque Populaire V in Brest in December 2009
- Other names: Maxi Spindrift 2
- Designer(s): VPLP
- Builder: CDK & JMV
- Launched: August 2008
- Owner(s): Dona Bertarelli Spindrift Racing

Racing career
- Skippers: Pascal Bidégorry; Loïck Peyron (2011–2013); Yann Guichard (2013–)

Specifications
- Displacement: 23 t (23 long tons; 25 short tons)
- Length: 40 m (130 ft) (LOA)
- Beam: 23 m (75 ft)
- Draft: 5.80 m (19.0 ft)
- Sail area: 720 m^{2} (7,800 sq ft)

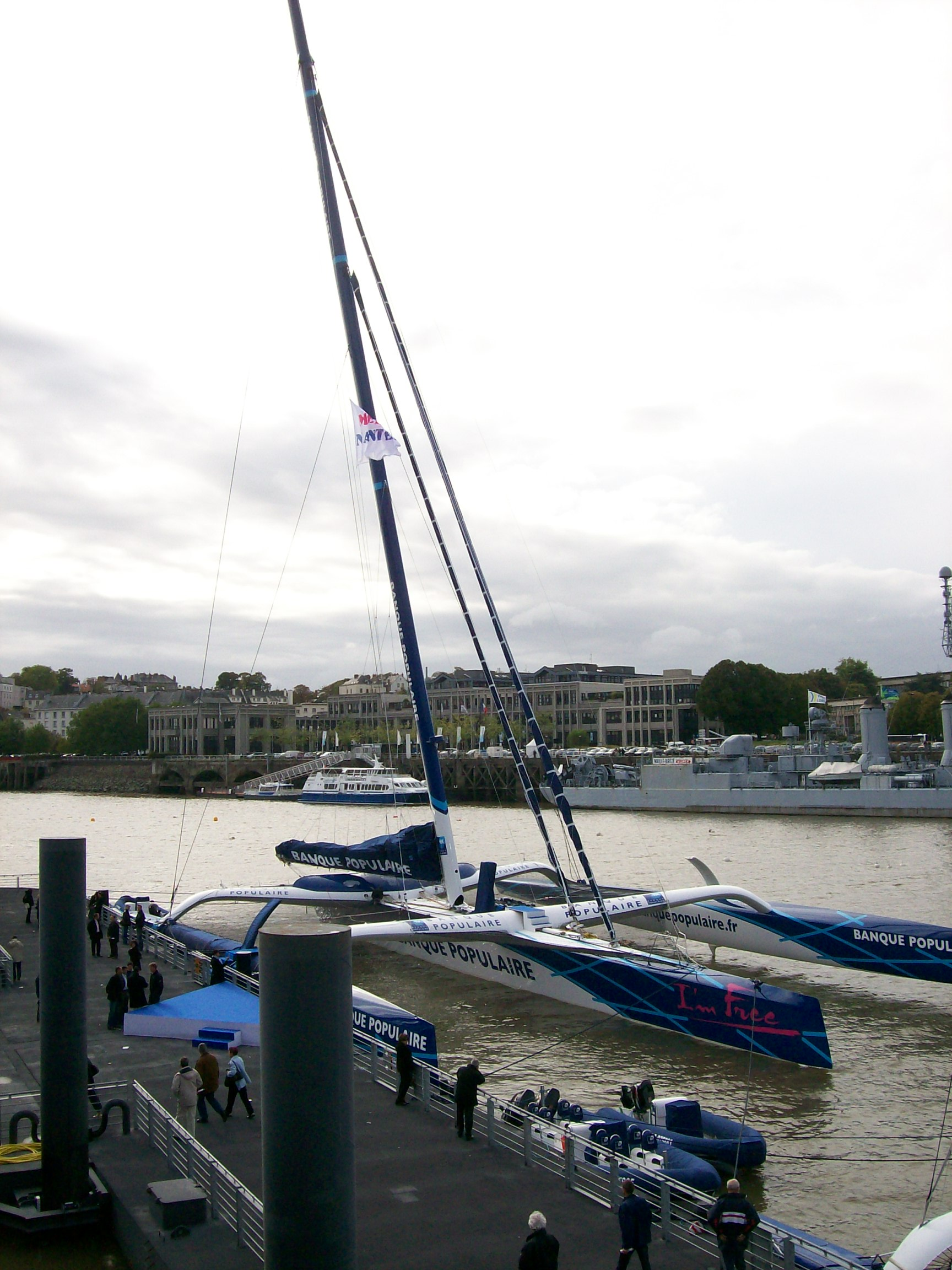
Banque Populaire V

Banque Populaire V, (now renamed Spindrift 2) is an offshore-racing trimaran which was originally run by Team Banque Populaire. It was Team Banque Populaire's fifth boat designed to set oceanic records. She was launched on 4 October 2008 in Nantes, France. She holds multiple records for sailing over set courses, as well as the record for distance sailed in 24 hours by any class of sailing boat, 908.2 nm.

With her 40 m (130 ft) length, she is currently the largest racing trimaran in the world. Her current skipper is Yann Guichard. Her previous skippers are Loick Peyron and Pascal Bidégorry. Her original sponsor was the French bank Banque Populaire. Currently she is owned by Dona Bertarelli & Spindrift Racing and sponsored by Mirabaud Group, Zenith and Genes-X.

== Design ==
The architectural project for Banque Populaire V started in 2006. The naval architects VPLP (Van Peteghem / Lauriot-Prévost) designed this G-Class maxi multihull. The trimaran was built by the shipyard CDK Technologies in Lorient.

== Career ==
=== Launch to 2012 Banque Populaire V ===
She was launched at the end of August 2008 in Lorient.

In 2009 she made her first attempt across the northern Atlantic from west to east. On Sunday 2 August 2009, she established the new record in 3 days, 15 hours, 25 minutes and 48 seconds (an average speed of 32.94 knots), beating the previous record, held by Franck Cammas on Groupama 3, by more than 12 hours. During the attempt she also broke the 24-hour distance twice, first with 880, then, several hours later, with 907 nautical miles (1,680 km).

In 2010 the boat was stationed in Brest, awaiting a weather opening to beat the Jules Verne Trophy record (circumnavigation of the world), held since 2010 by Franck Cammas and the multihull Groupama 3. The first such attempt started on January 22, 2011, but she hit some debris in the Southern Atlantic and was forced to retire on February 4.

Loïck Peyron took over as skipper from Pascal Bidégorry in June 2011. A second, successful attempt began on 22 November 2011 and set a new record in 45 days, 13 hours, and 43 minutes.

=== 2013 - Present - Spindrift 2 ===
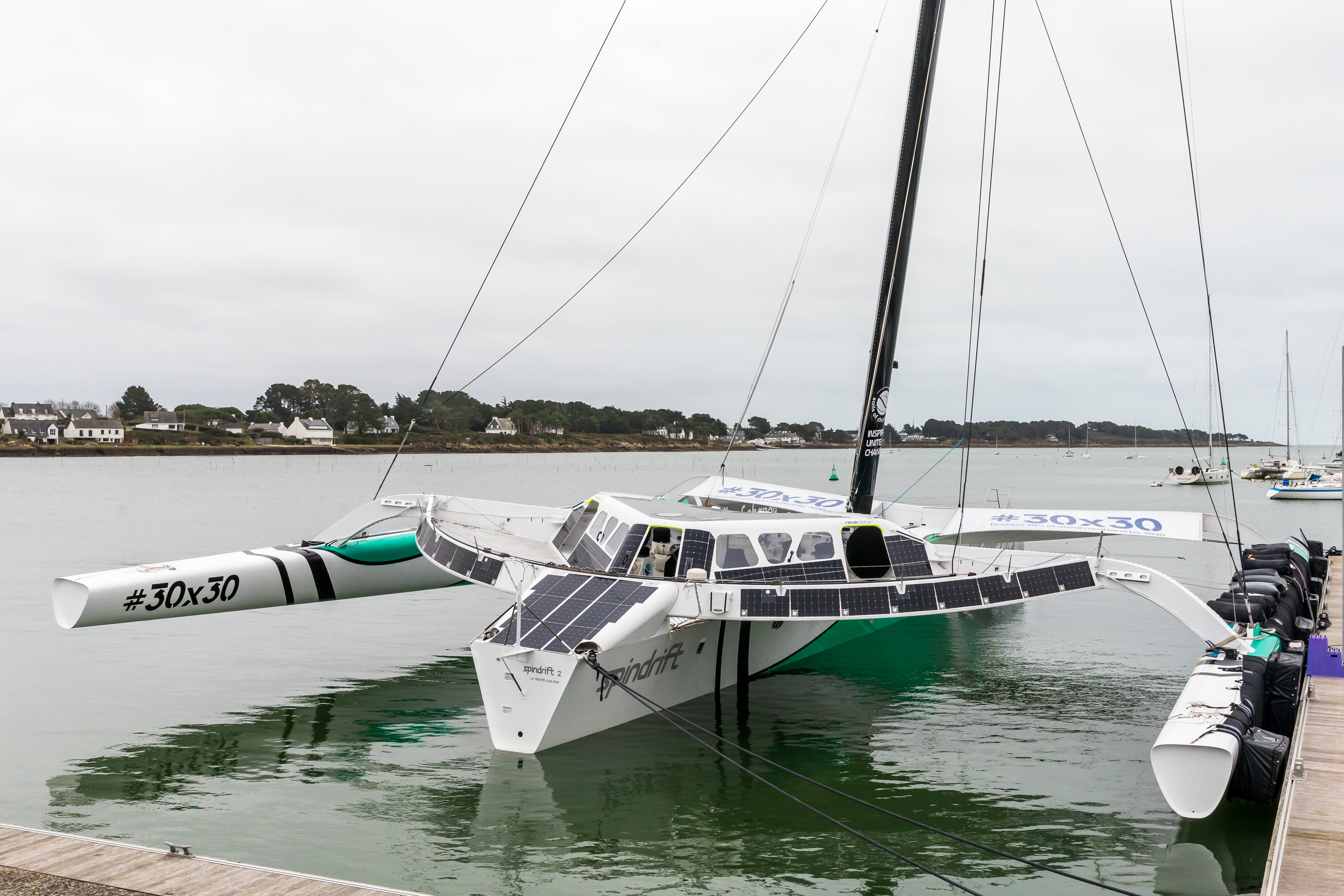
Spindrift 2, La Trinité-sur-Mer

In January 2013, the boat was acquired by Dona Bertarelli's racing team Spindrift Racing, and renamed Spindrift 2. The original 47 m mast was shortened by 6m for Yann Guichard to manage the boat single-handedly in the 2014 Route du Rhum, in which he achieved a second place in line honours. In 2015 a new 42 m mast was procured in view of a new attempt to break the Jules Verne record with a full crew. On 22 November 2015 it started in a direct race with IDEC Sport and finished just 2 days slower than the current JVT record.

The first 2019 JVT attempt started well under Yann Guichard when they broke the record between Ushant and the Equator (4d 19h 57') but they had to retire in Australia with a broken rudder stock. On 3 December 2019 the next attempt started but had to be terminated the next day due to more rudder problems at high speed.

== Records ==
- 24 hours distance, 908.2 nautical miles (1682 km), an average speed of 37.84 knots with a maximum speed of 47.16 knots during the record breaking Northern Atlantic passage of August 2009. Skippered by Pascal Bidegorry
- Northern Atlantic (New York City-Lizard Point), 2,921 nautical miles (5,410 km) in 3 days 15 hours 25 minutes 48 seconds, 2 August 2009, with an average speed of 33.41 knots (61.88 km/h). Skippered by Pascal Bidegorry. This is just two knots slower than the fastest Blue Riband Ocean Liner SS United States (1952, powered by 180.000 kW) and still two knots faster than second ranking RMS Queen Mary of 1938.
- Trans-Mediterranean record, between Marseille (France) and Carthage (Tunisia), 16 May 2010, in 14 hours 20 minutes and 34 seconds at an actual average speed of 33.24 knots. Skippered by Pascal Bidegorry
- Around the British Isles record, in 3 days, 3 hours and 49 minutes, 8 July 2010. Skippered by Loick Peyron
- Fastnet Race, in 1 day, 8 hours and 48 minutes, 15 August 2011, averaging 18.5 knots. Skippered by Loick Peyron
- Jules Verne Trophy (fastest circumnavigation around the world) (Since been surpassed) in 45 days, 13 hours, 42 minutes and 53 seconds, arrival 6 January 2012, averaging 19.75 knots. Skippered by Loick Peyron

== See also ==
- Comanche
- IDEC Sport
- Orange II
- USA 17 (yacht)

Records
Preceded by Groupama 3 with Franck Cammas	Jules Verne Trophy; 2012–2017	Succeeded by IDEC Sport
