= Alex Alley =

British sailor and author (born 1970)

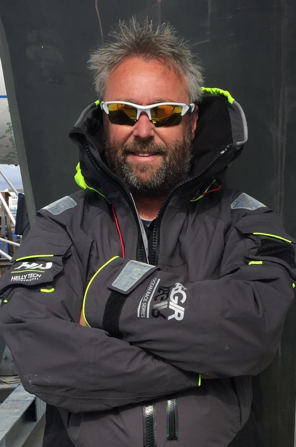
Alex Alley Photo

Alex Alley (born 23 October 1970) is a British sailor, public speaker and writer.

== Early life ==
Alley was born in Margate, Kent. He studied Naval Architecture and Yacht Design at Southampton and briefly worked at Kelsall Catamarans before beginning a career in professional racing.

== Sailing ==
Alley participated as a watch leader in the 2004-2005 Global Challenge Round the World Yacht Race. He set the Length of Britain World Record with Phil Sharp and Sean Conway, Followed by two solo records around the Isle of Wight in 2018 on his crowdfunding-supported yacht Pixel Flyer. In 2019, he attempted a solo, non-stop round-the-world record but had to abandon due to rigging failure.

During the non-stop round-the-world record he set a further five records, making it eight in total.

- Ushant to Cape Point, 40 foot monohull, solo
- Ushant to Cape Lewin, 40 foot monohull, solo
- Equator to Cape Point, 40 foot monohull, solo
- Equator to Cape Lewin, 40 foot monohull, solo
- Cape Point to Cape Lewin, 40 foot monohull, solo

== Personal life ==
Alley lives in Alverstoke, Gosport.

== Bibliography ==
- Alley, Alex. Boat to Boardroom: Leadership Lessons from the Global Challenge. [Upfront Publishing], [2009].
- Alley, Alex. The 7 Racing Rules on Winning: Leadership Lessons from the World of Sailing. [Upfront Publishing], [2012].
- Alley, Alex. Dare to Dream. [Upfront Publishing], [2025].
