= Volvo Ocean 65 Dongfeng Race Team =

Dongfeng Race Team
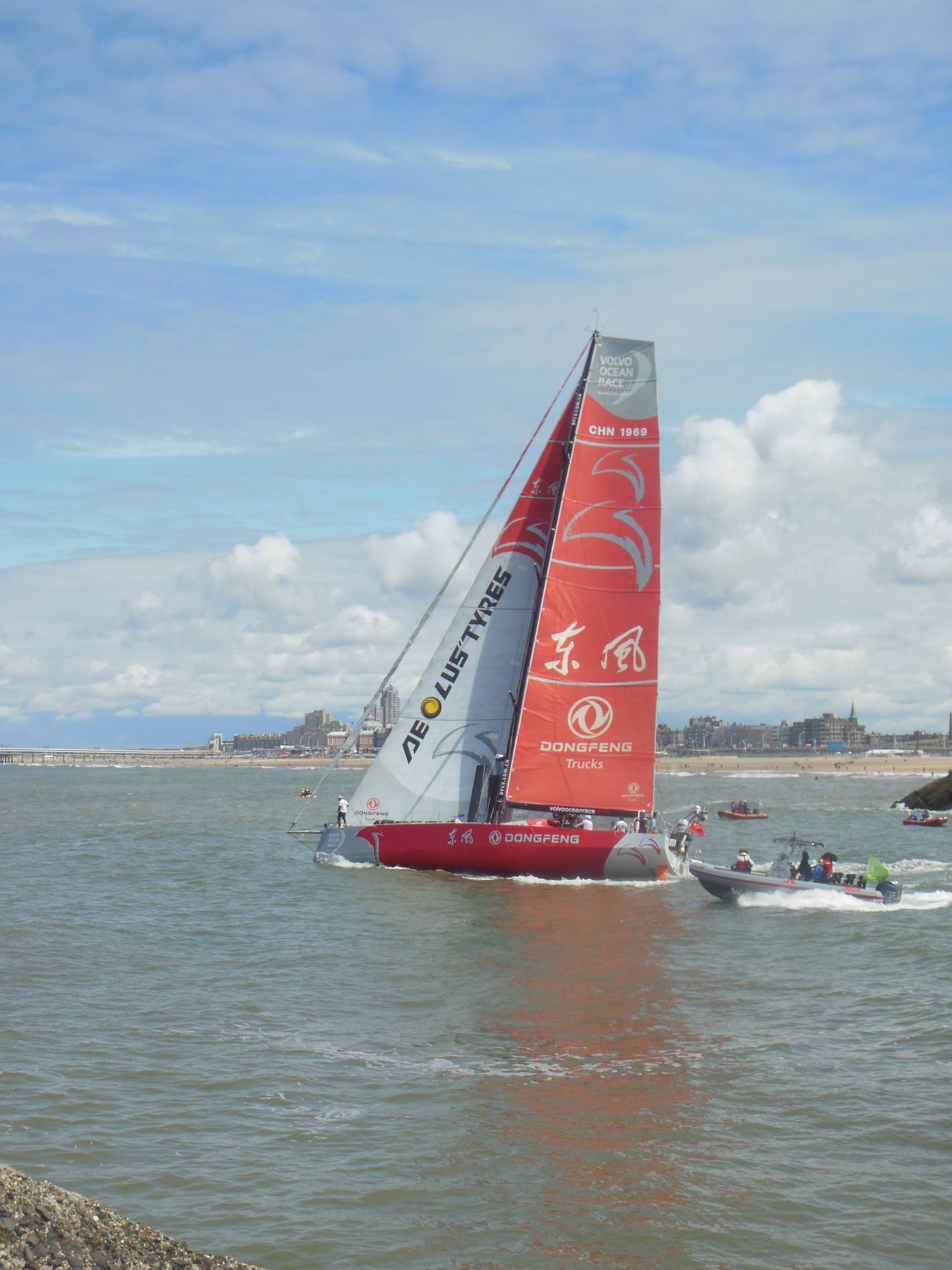
- Dongfeng Race Team in 2015.
- Nation: China
- Class: Volvo Ocean 65
- Sail no: CHN–1969
- Designer(s): Farr Yacht Design

Racing career
- Skippers: Charles Caudrelier

Mirpuri Foundation Racing Team (formerly Dongfeng Race Team) is a Volvo Ocean 65 yacht. Under Chinese sponsorship she finished third in the 2014–15 Volvo Ocean Race skippered by Charles Caudrelier and then went on to win the 2017–2018 edition, which started in Alicante, Spain, and ended in The Hague, in the Netherlands.

In 2019 the Portuguese Mirpuri Foundation Racing Team took ownership of the yacht. Winning the 2021 The Ocean Race Europe with skipper Yoann Richomme and placing third in the 2023 The Ocean Race in its class with skipper Roberto Bermúdez de Castro.

== Mirpuri Foundation Racing Team ==
=== 2023 The Ocean Race crew ===
- Skipper: Roberto 'Chuny' Bermúdez de Castro
- Crew Members: Peter van Niekerk, Suzy Peters, Mike Pammenter, Charlotte Porter, David Swete, Gonzalo Araujo, Carlos Bermúdez de Castro, Thor Malthe Andersen, Iben Nielsby Christensen
- Onboard Reporter: Danny Inkyov

=== 2021 The Ocean Race Europe crew ===
- Skipper: Yoann Richomme
- Navigator: Nicolas Lunven
- Watch leader: Jack Bouttell
- Bowman: Olly Young
- Helmsman / Trimmer: Bernardo Freitas, Frederico Pinheiro de Melo
- Pitman: Willy Altadill
- Float: Mariana Lobato
- Mid bow: Emily Nagel
- Trimmer: Rob Bunce
- Onboard Reporter: Martin Keruzoré

== Dongfeng Race Team ==
=== 2017-18 Volvo Ocean Race crew ===
- Skipper: Charles Caudrelier
- Crew Members: Carolijn Brouwer, Chen Jinhao, Daryl Wislang, Fabien Delahaye, Jackson Bouttell, Jérémie Beyou, Justine Mettraux, Kevin Escoffier, Marie Riou, Stuart Bannatyne, Xue Liu
- Navigator: Pascal Bidégorry, Franck Cammas

=== 2014-15 Volvo Ocean Race crew ===
- Skipper: Charles Caudrelier
- Crew Members: Eric Peron, Chen Jin Hao, Kevin Escoffier, Martin Strömberg, Pascal Bidégorry, Thomas Rouxel, Yang Jiru
- Onboard reporter: Yann Riou
