= Francisco Alarcón =

Francisco Alarcón may refer to:

- Francisco Alarcón (footballer) (born 1985), Chilean footballer
- Francisco Román Alarcón (born 1992), Spanish footballer
- Francisco X. Alarcón (1954–2016), American poet and educator
