= MOD 70 =

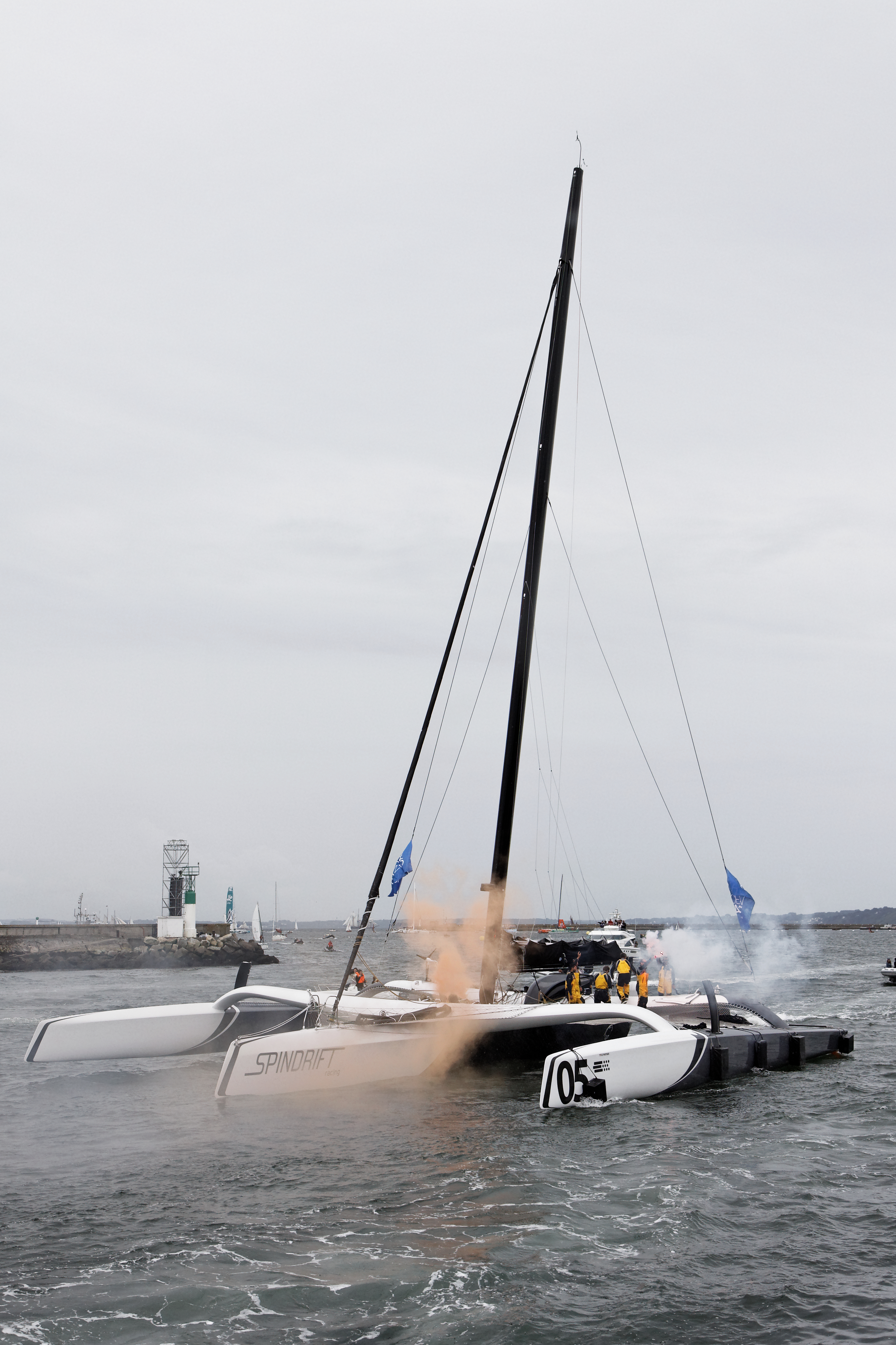
- MOD 70 Spindrift in 2012.

Boat
- Draft: 4.5 m (15 ft)

Hull
- LOA: 21.2 m (70 ft)
- Beam: 16.8 m (55 ft)

Rig
- Mast height: 29 m (95 ft)

The Multi One Design 70 (MOD 70) is a 21.2-metre (70 ft) multihull one-design yacht class, named after the Multi One Design company, created in 2009. The MOD 70 is a class of trimaran boats.

| Hull No. | Sail No. | Boat name | Date |
|---|---|---|---|
| 1 | Race for Water | SUI 1 | 2011–2021 |
| 1 | AXCISS GROUP | FRA 1 | 2022–present |
| 2 | VEOLIA Environnement, #2 | | |
| 2 | ORION RACING, #2 | | |
| 3 | FONCIA, #3 | | |
| 3 | BEAU GESTE #3 | | |
| 3 | PHAEDO 3 #3 | | |
| 3 | SNOWFLAKE, #3 | | |
| 4 | EDMOND de ROTHSCHILD, #4 | | |
| 4 | GITANA XV, #4 | | |
| 4 | GROUPE EDMOND de ROTHSCHILD, #4 | | |
| 4 | MASERATI, #4 | | |
| 5 | MANA, #5 | | |
| 5 | SPINDRIFT RACING, #5 | | |
| 6 | VIRBAC PAPREC 70, #06 | | |
| 6 | PAPREC RECYCLAGE, #06 | | |
| 6 | ZOULOU, #06 | | |
| 6 | CONCISE 10 #6 | | |
| 6 | POWERPLAY, #06 | | |
| 7 | AIR OMAN - MUSAMAN, #7 | | |
| 7 | ARGO, #7 | | |
| 7 | MUSAMAN - OMAN SAIL, #7 | | |
