= Phil Sharp (sailor) =

British speed-sailor (born 1981)

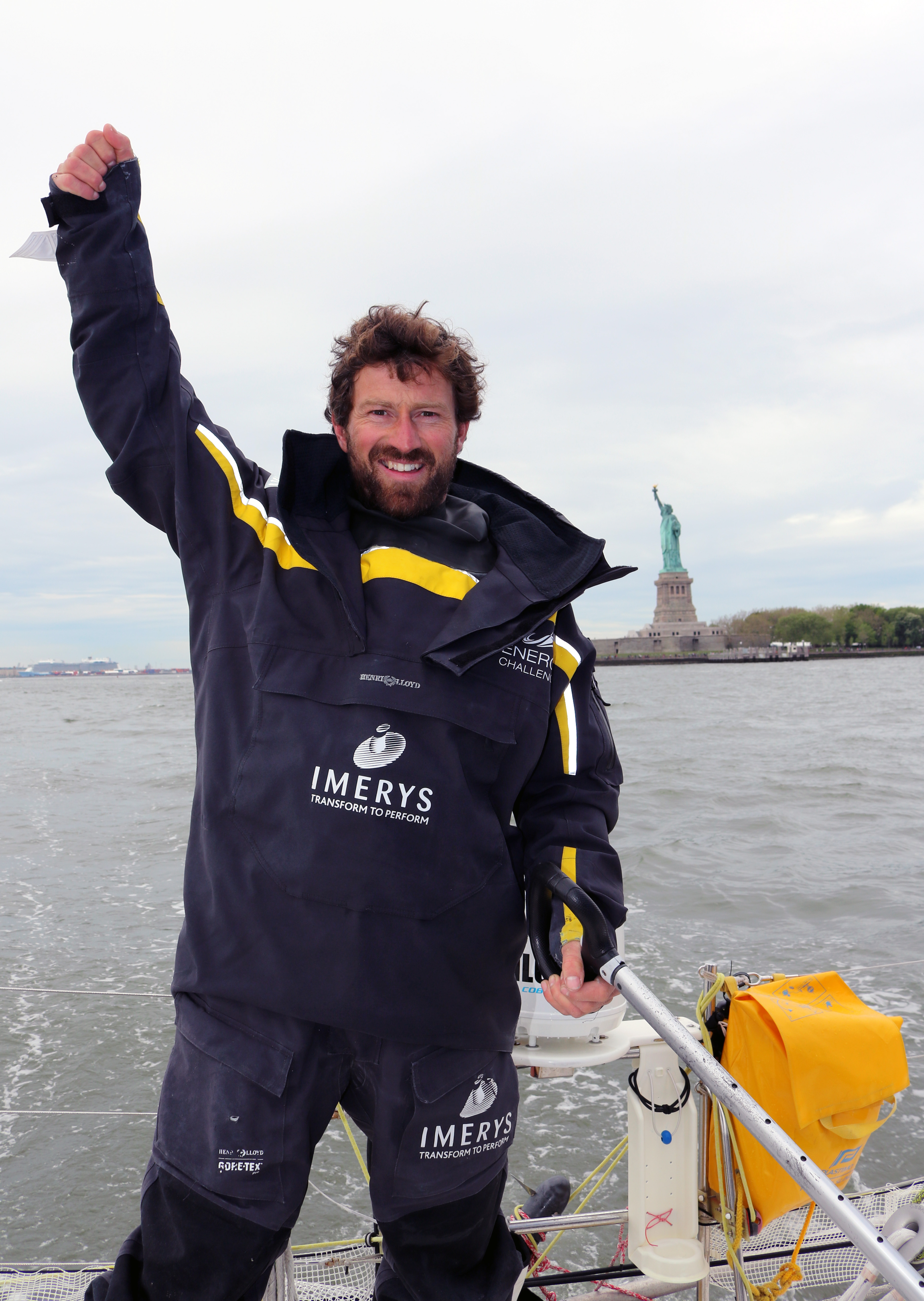
- Sharp at the finish of the Transat Bakerly 2016 single-handed race aboard Class40 Imerys

Personal information
- Nationality: British
- Born: 11 May 1981 (age 45) Jersey, Channel Islands
- Occupations: Yachtsman and mechanical engineer
- Website: philsharpracing.com

Phil Sharp (born 11 May 1981) is a British yachtsman. He was born in Jersey (Channel Islands), educated at Victoria College Jersey and qualified from Imperial College London with an MSc in Mechanical Engineering. Sharp holds World Speed Sailing Records. and Guinness World Records for the Cowes-to-Dinard monohull under 60 ft singlehanded (set in 2016), and crewed around Britain and Ireland under 40 ft (set in 2018).

== Biography ==
Racing a 2013 Manuard Mach 2 design under the name Imerys Clean Energy, Sharp won the Class40 ocean racing Championship in 2017 and 2018 with title sponsor Imerys.

In 2006, Sharp won the Route du Rhum single-handed race from St Malo, Brittany, to Guadeloupe aboard a Class40 and is entered for the 2018 edition. In 2016, Sharp lost his lead in the single-handed in the Transat Bakerly (Plymouth, UK – New York, US) after his mainsail shredded in a storm. Sharp made a temporary repair and finished the race in 3rd place.

Sharp is a mechanical engineering specialist in high-performance composite structural design. He engineered a 43-metre (141 ft) wind turbine through his time at Blade Dynamics on the Isle of Wight and three carbon-fibre booms at Future Fibres in Valencia, Spain. The previous claim on this page that "Sharp designed the largest Superyacht in the world 'A'" is not factually accurate, the yacht was designed by Dykstra Naval Architects and Nobiskrug, Sharp was involved in the design of the three carbon-fibre booms - as mentioned in earlier in this article. The £260 million superyacht has a length of 144 metres (473 ft) and a gross tonnage of 12,558. In 2018 Sharp co-founded Genevos in La Rochelle to develop and commercialise marine fuel cells to decarbonise vessels with green hydrogen.

Sharp is a member of the Royal Cruising Club and Royal Channel Islands Yacht Club. He is a founder of PS Racing Ltd, a sports-management company which operates OceansLab – Race to Zero Emissions. A key campaign objective is to compete in the Everest of Sailing, the Vendee Globe solo, non-stop, around the world race, while being powered by wind and a Genevos Hydrogen Power Module.

In 2023 he commissioned his new boat Oceanslab.

== Records ==
- 2019: Monohull (40 ft and single-handed) for Around the Isle of Wight. Starting and finishing on 19 December 2019, the distance of 50 nautical miles (93 km; 58 mi) was sailed at an average speed of 9.83 knots (18.21 km/h; 11.31 mph) in 5 hours, 5 minutes and 4 seconds.
- 2018: Monohull (crewed, up to 40 feet) for the Round Britain and Ireland. Starting on 12 August 2018, the distance of 1,773 nautical miles (3,284 km; 2,040 mi) sailed was covered at an average speed of 9.03 knots (16.72 km/h; 10.39 mph) in 8 days, 4 hours, 14 minutes.
- 2016: Monohull and multihull (single-handed up to 60 feet) for the Channel (Cowes, Isle of Wight – Dinard, Brittany). The route distance of 138 nautical miles (256 km; 159 mi) was covered on 24 November in 9 hours 3 minutes with an average speed of 15.25 knots (28.24 km/h; 17.55 mph) 15.25 kn (28.24 km/h).
