= Yann Guichard =

French sailor

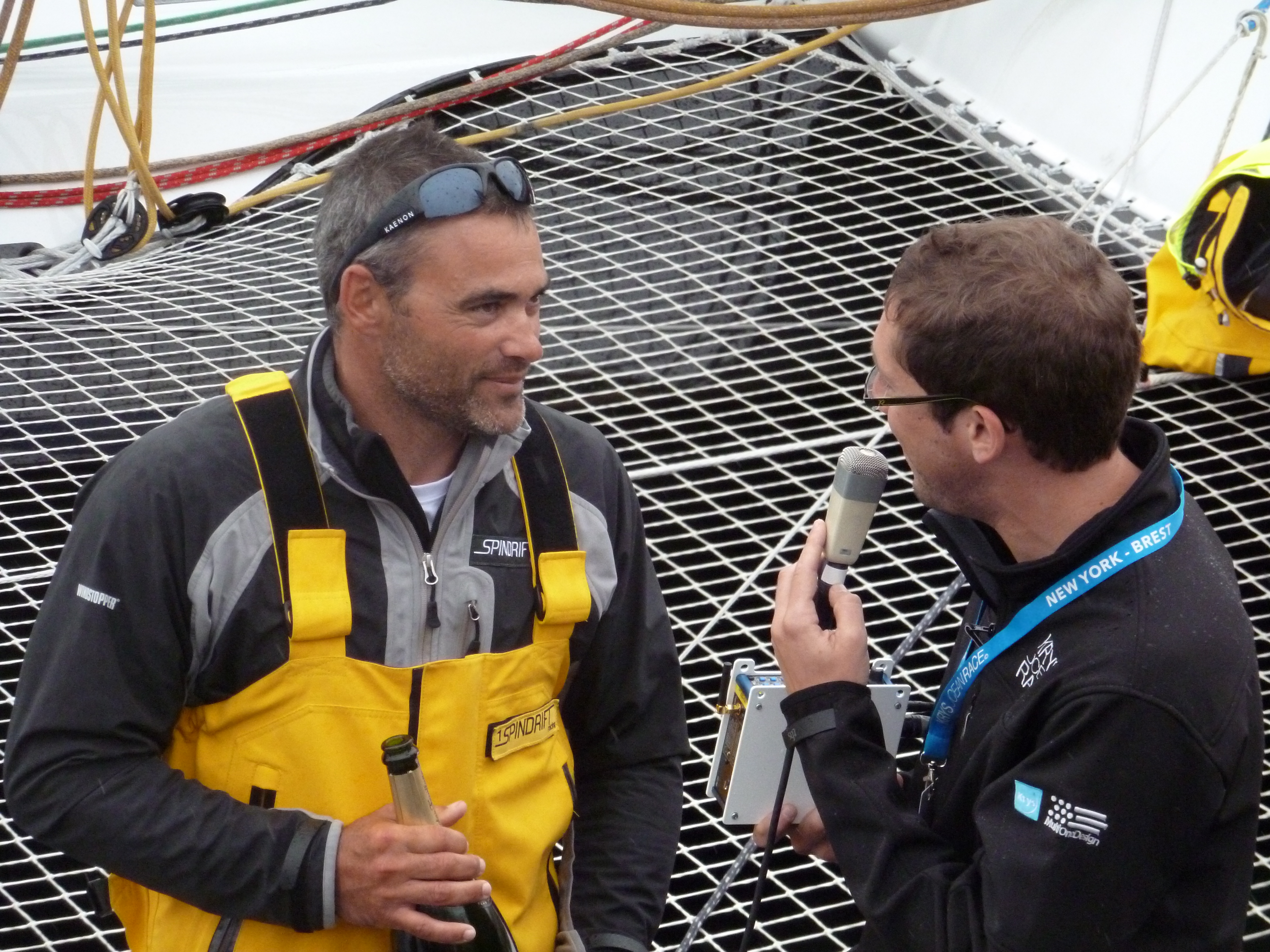
- Yann Guichard in 2012

Personal information
- Nationality: French
- Born: 23 May 1974 (age 50); Paris, France

Sport
- Sport: Sailing

Yann Guichard (born 23 May 1974) is a French sailor. He competed in the Tornado event at the 2000 Summer Olympics.
